= The Karnstein Trilogy =

British vampire films, 1970–1971

The Karnstein Trilogy is a series of vampire films produced by Hammer Films. They were notable at the time for their daring lesbian storylines. All three films were scripted by Tudor Gates. All three feature vampires of the noble Karnstein family, and their seat Castle Karnstein near the town of Karnstein in Styria, Austria.

== The trilogy ==
- The Vampire Lovers (1970), set in 1794 Styria, starred Polish-born Ingrid Pitt as lesbian vampire Countess Mircalla Karnstein (born 1522, died 1546). The film was based on the famous 1872 novella "Carmilla" by J. Sheridan Le Fanu; the name Mircalla being an anagram of Carmilla, which is an alias Mircalla uses throughout the story.
- Lust for a Vampire (1971), featured Danish actress Yutte Stensgaard as Mircalla's descendant Carmilla (born 1688, died 1710). Set in 1830 (it's suggested the Karnsteins reappear every 40 years), Carmilla adopts the name of her ancestor to seduce and murder her way through an exclusive girls' school.
- Twins of Evil (1971) features Damien Thomas as Mircalla's descendant, the evil Count Karnstein. Mircalla herself, played by German actress Katya Wyeth, appears briefly (though her date of death is now given as 1547). The story concerns sisters Maria and Frieda Gellhorn (played by identical twin Playboy Playmates Mary Collinson and Madeleine Collinson). It is apparently a prequel to the first film: it depicts a member of the Karnstein family as living instead of vampiric and the set design and costumes give the film a 17th-century look and feel, thus resulting in each of the three films being set in a different century.

== Other films ==
A planned fourth film in the series, variously announced as either The Vampire Virgins or The Vampire Hunters, only got as far as the early draft stage.

== Vampire lore ==
The vampires of the Karnstein Trilogy differ from those of the Hammer Dracula films. Here, vampires can walk about in daylight and are immune to fire (their bodies are consumed, but their spirits just create or inhabit a new body). Their weaknesses are garlic and crosses, and the only ways to kill them is by staking them through their hearts or beheading them. Some of this lore is retained in the 1972 Hammer film Vampire Circus.

Cast and characters

Key
- A ^{Y} indicates the actor portrayed the role of a younger version of the character.
- An ^{O} indicates a role as an older version of the character.
- A ^{V} indicates the actor or actress lent only their voice for their film character.
- An ^{M} indicates the model served as a body double, with the actor or actress's likeness superimposed onto the model.
- An ^{L} indicates the actor or actress lent only their likeness for their film character.
- A ^{P} indicates an appearance through a photographic still.
- An ^{A} indicates an appearance through archival footage or audio.
- A dark gray cell indicates the character was not in the film.

Character		Main films		
Character		The Vampire Lovers	Lust for a Vampire	Twins of Evil
Character		1970	1971	
Marcilla "Carmilla" Countess Mircalla Karnstein Lady Durward		Ingrid Pitt	Yutte Stensgaard	Katya Wyeth
General Spielsdorf	Giles Barton	Peter Cushing	Ralph Bates	Peter Cushing
Gustav Weil		Peter Cushing	Ralph Bates	Peter Cushing
Landlord		Charles Farrell	Michael Brennan	
Count Karnstein Lord Hagen Durward		Mentioned	Mike Raven	Damien Thomas
1st Villager			Nick Brimble	
The Countess Karnstein		Dawn Addams	Mentioned	
Roger Morton		George Cole		
The Governess Mademoiselle Perrodot		Kate O'Mara		
Emma Morton		Madeline Smith		
Baron Joachim von Hartog		Douglas Wilmer		
Carl Ebhardt		Jon Finch		
Doctor		Ferdy Mayne		
Laura		Pippa Steel		
The First Vampire		Kirsten Lindholm		
The Man in Black		John Forbes-Robertson		
Housekeeper		Shelagh Wilcocks		
Gretchin		Janet Key		
Renton		Harvey Hall		
Richard LeStrange			Michael Johnson	
The Countess Herritzen			Barbara Jefford	
Janet Playfair			Suzanna Leigh	
Miss Simpson			Helen Christie	
Inspector Heinrich			Harvey Hall	
Susan Pelley			Pippa Steel	
Amanda			Judy Matheson	
Raymond Pelley			David Healy	
Biggs			Jonathan Cecil	
Professor Herz			Erik Chitty	
Bishop			Jack Melford	
Hans			Christopher Neame	
Peasant Girl			Kirsten Lindholm	
Trudi			Luan Peters	
Coachman			Chris Cunningham	
Schoolgirl			Sue Longhurst	
Katy Weil				Kathleen Byron
Maria Gellhorn				Mary Collinson
Frieda Gellhorn				Madeleine Collinson
Anton Hoffer				David Warbeck
Joachim				Roy Stewart
Ingrid Hoffer				Isobel Black
Franz				Harvey Hall
Hermann				Alex Scott
Dietrich				Dennis Price
Lady in Coach				Shelagh Wilcox
Woodman				Inigo Jackson
Woodman's Daughter				Judy Matheson
Young Girl at Stake				Kirsten Lindholm
Gerta				Luan Peters
Gaoler				Peter Thompson
