= Lesbian vampire =

Literary trope

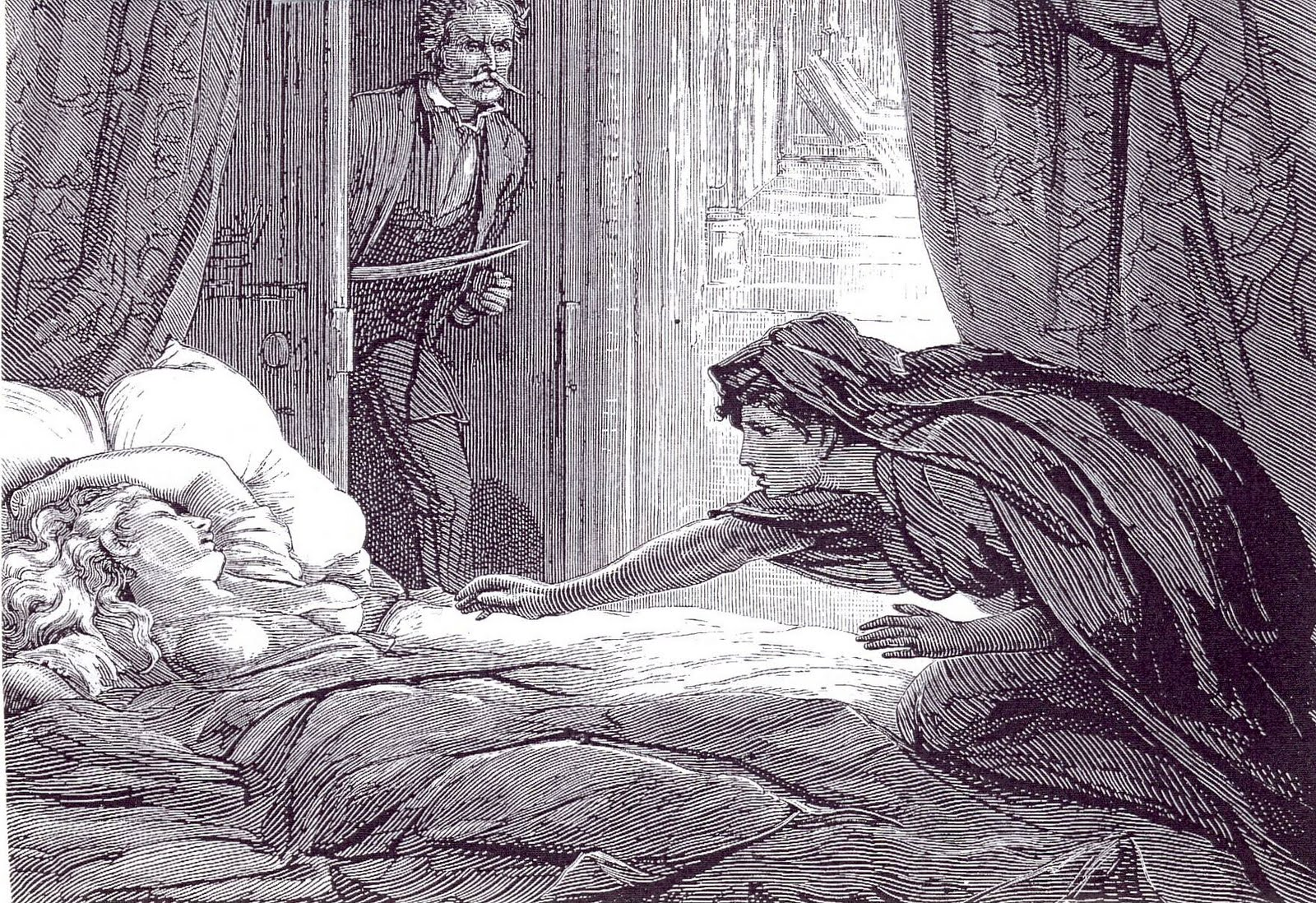
Illustration by D. H. Friston that accompanied the first publication of lesbian vampire novella Carmilla in The Dark Blue magazine in 1872

Lesbian vampirism is a trope in early gothic horror and 20th century exploitation film.

== Origins and early history ==
Women have been central to many vampiric myths throughout the world. Scholars and artists have, for example, seen the Greek and Albanian myths related to the Libyan queen turned flesh eating monster Lamia as proto-vampire seduction stories. In Malaysian traditions, the vampiric pontianak is created when a woman or feminine figure dies during childbirth or is murdered by a man. In their death, the pontianak then dedicates themself to taking vengeance on men who perpetrate violence against women and children. In European folklore, the story of the real-life Countess Elizabeth Báthory and her fictionalized charges of murdering young, attractive women and girls is often cited as one key inspiration for not only female vampires, but also feminine vampires with a keen interest in young women specifically.

The portrayal of vampires has had sexual connotations since the Victorian era, when the seductive nature of vampire was used to warn women away from sexual behavior and desires for sexual contact outside of marriage. The women in Victorian era vampire media were often portrayed as sexually transgressive and then punished for said transgressions. The trope of lesbian vampires appeared during this time to reinforce the supposed inhuman nature of sapphic desire and romantic attraction between women.

== Carmilla and its adaptations ==
The genre has its roots in Sheridan le Fanu's novella Carmilla about the love of a female vampire for a young woman:

Sometimes after an hour of apathy, my strange and beautiful companion would take my hand and hold it with a fond pressure, renewed again and again; blushing softly, gazing in my face with languid and burning eyes, and breathing so fast that her dress rose and fell with the tumultuous respiration. It was like the ardour of a lover; it embarrassed me; it was hateful and yet overpowering; and with gloating eyes she drew me to her, and her hot lips travelled along my cheek in kisses; and she would whisper, almost in sobs, 'You are mine, you shall be mine, and you and I are one for ever'. (Carmilla, Chapter 4).

Carmilla is a constant presence in the protagonist, Laura's life. Her role evolves from mother to lover, though their relationship revolves around Carmilla feeding on Laura. When Carmilla is discovered later in the novella, the story plays on themes of patriarchy and homophobia as Carmilla is seen to be corrupting and tarnishing these young women.

Dracula's Daughter (1936) gave the first hints of lesbian attraction in a vampire film, in the scene in which the title character, portrayed by Gloria Holden, preys upon an attractive girl she has invited to her house to pose for her. Universal highlighted Countess Zaleska's attraction to women in some of its original advertising for the film, using the tag line "Save the women of London from Dracula's Daughter!"

Le Fanu's Carmilla was adapted by Roger Vadim as Blood and Roses in 1960. Terror in the Crypt (1964) follows suit, with a portrayal of subtle lesbian attraction between a Karnstein descendant (possessed by Carmilla) and her victim. More explicit lesbian content was provided in Hammer Studios production of the Karnstein Trilogy of films loosely adapted from Carmilla. The Vampire Lovers (1970) was the first, starring Ingrid Pitt and Madeline Smith. It was a relatively straightforward re-telling of LeFanu's novella, but with more overt violence and sexuality. Lust for a Vampire (1971) followed, with Yutte Stensgaard as the same character played by Pitt, returning to prey upon students at an all-girls school. This version had her falling in love with a male teacher at the school. Twins of Evil (1971) had the least "lesbian" content, with one female vampire biting a female victim on the breast. It starred real life identical twins and Playboy Playmates Madeleine and Mary Collinson. Partially due to censorship restraints from the BBFC, Hammer's trilogy actually had fewer lesbian elements as it progressed.

In 2023, Dark Horse Comics's Berger Books imprint published the comic Carmilla: The First Vampire written by Amy Chu and illustrated by Soo Lee. The story introduces Carmilla to 1990s New York, and the protagonist consults In a Glass Darkly while investigating the mysterious deaths of various LGBT+ women. For writing the comic, Chu won the Bram Stoker Award for Superior Achievement in a Graphic Novel

== In other media ==
The 2010 animated series Adventure Time features a bisexual vampire named Marceline the Vampire Queen, whose primary love interest is Princess Bubblegum. In the mockumentary vampire comedy What We Do in the Shadows, the female lead is a pansexual vampire named Nadja of Antipaxos. The third season of the Netflix adult animation Castlevania introduces characters Morana and Striga, two female vampires in a romantic relationship. The television adaptation of Anne Rice's Interview with the Vampire depicts vampires Claudia and Madeleine as romantic companions.

Blood of the Tribades, released in 2016, is an updated variant on the trope and was described as "a modern take on 70s Euro arthouse and Hammer lesbian vampire movies that...takes on today's stormy political climate, religious zealotry and gender issues."

== See also ==
- The Celluloid Closet (book)
  - The Celluloid Closet (film)
- LGBT themes in horror fiction
- LGBT themes in speculative fiction
- Elizabeth Báthory in popular culture
- Erotic horror
- Tracey Wigginton, an Australian murderer nicknamed "the Lesbian Vampire Killer"
