= Lust for a Vampire =

1971 film by Jimmy Sangster

- US theatrical release poster
- Directed by: Jimmy Sangster
- Screenplay by: Tudor Gates
- Based on: Characters by Sheridan Le Fanu
- Produced by: Michael Style; Harry Fine
- Starring: Ralph Bates; Barbara Jefford; Suzanna Leigh
- Cinematography: David Muir
- Edited by: Spencer Reeve
- Music by: Harry Robinson
- Production company: Hammer Film Productions
- Distributed by: MGM-EMI Distributors
- Release dates: 17 January 1971 (UK); 15 September 1971 (US)
- Running time: 95 minutes
- Country: United Kingdom
- Language: English

Lust for a Vampire, also known as Love for a Vampire or To Love a Vampire (the latter title was the one used on American television), is a 1971 British Hammer Horror film directed by Jimmy Sangster, starring Ralph Bates, Barbara Jefford, Suzanna Leigh, Michael Johnson, and Yutte Stensgaard. It was given an R rating in the United States for some violence, gore, strong adult content and nudity. It is the second film in the Karnstein Trilogy, loosely based on the 1872 Sheridan Le Fanu novella Carmilla. It was preceded by The Vampire Lovers (1970) and followed by Twins of Evil (1971). The three films do not form a chronological development, but use the Karnstein family as the source of the vampiric threat and were somewhat daring for the time in explicitly depicting lesbian themes.

Production of Lust for a Vampire began not long after the release of The Vampire Lovers.

The film has a cult following, although some Hammer Horror fans have accused it of being overly camp. Its most noted scene shows Yutte Stensgaard drenched in blood and partially covered by blood-soaked rags, although the filmed scene is not as explicit as that shown in a promotional still.

== Plot ==
The film is set in the 1830s, 40 years after the events of The Vampire Lovers. In the deserted chapel at Castle Karnstein, Count and Countess Karnstein conduct a Satanic ceremony to resurrect the body of their daughter Carmilla. Novelist Richard LeStrange has come to the village to get background for his books about witches, vampires and black magic. Warned to beware of Castle Karnstein, he takes no heed. Immediately upon entering the castle, he is set upon by three women dressed in shrouds. They turn out to be students on an educational tour from Miss Simpson's fashionable finishing school. As LeStrange is being introduced to Miss Simpson and her students, a new student arrives, one Mircalla Herritzen. LeStrange falls in love immediately.

Later that evening, when LeStrange relates his adventure to the men at the village inn, one of the serving girls is found dead with two holes in her neck, and LeStrange is convinced that the Karnstein story is not mere superstition. When he chances to meet the recently hired teacher of English literature on his way to Miss Simpson's school, LeStrange tricks him into going to Vienna and arranges to take his position at the school. Shortly thereafter, Mircalla's roommate Susan Pelley disappears. When the headmaster Giles Barton discovers the secret of Mircalla/Carmilla, he offers himself to her. Later that day, after Barton's body is found, LeStrange goes through his books and discovers what Barton had learned; that Mircalla Herritzen is Carmilla Karnstein. LeStrange confesses his love for her, and they make love whilst the song Strange Love plays.

Miss Simpson, worried about the disappearance of a student and the death of her headmaster, decides not to call in the authorities or to notify Susan Pelley's father, particularly when Countess Herritzen's private physician agrees to certify Barton's death as a heart attack. However, dance teacher Janet Playfair notifies both the police and Mr Pelley, all of whom arrive to investigate. The Karnsteins manage to kill the policeman who has just discovered Susan's body in the bottom of a well, but Mr Pelley arrives with a writ of exhumation and a pathologist to investigate his daughter's death. Susan's body is exhumed (it has just been conveniently buried by the Karnsteins), and talk gets around that she was the victim of a vampire. Together with the local priest, the villagers storm Castle Karnstein with the intent of burning it to the ground. LeStrange also makes his way to the castle, planning to save Mircalla. The villagers trap all three Karnsteins in the burning castle, where a timber falls from the ceiling and impales Mircalla/Carmilla. LeStrange is saved from the fire, with Count and Countess Karnstein remaining, safe in the knowledge that fire does not destroy them.

== Cast ==
- Michael Johnson as Richard LeStrange
- Yutte Stensgaard as Mircalla Herritzen/Carmilla Karnstein
- Ralph Bates as Giles Barton
- Barbara Jefford as Countess Herritzen
- Suzanna Leigh as Janet Playfair
- Helen Christie as Miss Simpson
- Mike Raven as Count Karnstein (dubbed by Valentine Dyall, uncredited)
- Harvey Hall as Inspector Heinrich
- Michael Brennan as landlord
- Pippa Steel as Susan Pelley
- Judy Matheson as Amanda
- David Healy as Raymond Pelley
- Jonathan Cecil as Biggs
- Erik Chitty as Professor Herz
- Jack Melford as bishop
- Christopher Neame as Hans
- Kirsten Lindholm as peasant girl
- Luan Peters as Trudi
- Christopher Cunningham as coachman
- Nick Brimble as 1st villager
- Sue Longhurst as schoolgirl

== Production ==
Tudor Gates was hired to write the original script called To Love a Vampire, following the success of The Vampire Lovers. He says it was based on an original script he wrote for Mario Bava about a girls school which had a serial killer. Gates liked the script and said it had "a serious love story" but then the film "all went wrong." He had to use Yutte Stensgaard who came from James Carreras. Terence Fisher was to direct but he was badly injured in a car accident. At one stage Harry Fine was going to direct but then Jimmy Sangster took over. Gates said Sangster clashed with the producers during filming over creative decisions – such as the producers insisting on a pop song being put in the film to copy the pop song from Butch Cassidy and the Sundance Kid (1969).

Ingrid Pitt from The Vampire Lovers was meant to star but she was busy on another film.

The film was financed by EMI Films."

Partially due to censorship restraints from the British Board of Film Classification, this film and the next one, Twins of Evil, had diminishingly overt lesbian elements in the story than did The Vampire Lovers. Carmilla, for example, in this film falls in love with a man. Ingrid Pitt was offered the lead, but turned it down. Peter Cushing was supposed to have appeared in the film, but bowed out to care for his sick wife. Cushing was replaced by Bates, who described Lust for a Vampire as "one of the worst films ever made". Bates had earlier appeared in Taste the Blood of Dracula with Madeline Smith, who starred in The Vampire Lovers.

The song "Strange Love" was recorded for the film by Tracy, a teenage singer from Wembley, and released as a 7-inch single, produced by Bob Barratt.

The castle shown in the film to represent Karnstein Castle is the famous Hochosterwitz Castle in Austria, which was also used in the Hammer film Twins of Evil.

== Critical reception ==
The Monthly Film Bulletin wrote: "Despite its exploitative title, Hammer's second excursion into the territory of Le Fanu's Carmilla is – like The Vampire Lovers – reasonably in keeping with the spirit of the original ... Yutte Stensgaard's Mircalla effectively exudes an aura of utterly sensual evil, and Ralph Bates is excellent as the occult scholar who becomes infatuated with her, while Le Fanu's claustrophobic girls' dormitory world is nicely evoked in images ... that build up an atmosphere of properly cloying intensity; and one long, particularly audacious tracking shot down the garden to the lake (in which the camera becomes Mircalla stalking and embracing her victim) communicates just the right feeling of narcissism and ghostly physicality. ... Lust for a Vampire suffers – like many recent additions to the vampire genre – from the absence of any positive force for good to counterbalance the all-engulfing sensuality, and for about its last third the film disintegrates into a mechanical succession of victims and intrigues."

The Hammer Story: The Authorised History of Hammer Films called the film a "cynical and depressing exercise", and suggested that "one can only imagine what Fisher, Cushing and Bray's craftsmen might have made of Gates' reasonably literate draft."

Bruce G. Hallenbeck asserts that "there is much to recommend" the movie, noting that a Gothic atmosphere is "ably evoked", and adding, "I think it was a very good script". Hallenbeck quotes Tudor Gates, the writer of all three films in the Karnstein Trilogy, as saying, "I think, in a way, it was the better of the first two". Sangster reflected making the film as one of his regrets while remembering sinking down in embarrassment when he and Bates went to a screening and heard the song that played in the middle of the film.

== See also ==
- Vampire films
