= Vampria: The Toothless Vampire =

2020 Animated children's film directed by Ali Soltanian Fard Jahromi

- Directed by: Ali Soltanian Fard Jahromi
- Screenplay by: Ali Soltanian Fard Jahromi
- Story by: Fatimah Soltanian Fard Jahromi
- Produced by: Ali Soltanian Fard Jahromi; Fatimah Soltanian Fard Jahromi
- Starring: Zahra Yasmin Soltanian; Zakiyah Soltanian Fard Jahromi; Ali Soltanian Fard Jahromi; Fatimah Soltanian Fard Jahromi; Mustafa Soltanian Fard Jahromi
- Production company: Soltanian Productions
- Distributed by: Amazon Prime
- Release date: 17 September 2020
- Running time: 19 minutes
- Country: New Zealand
- Language: English

Vampria: The Toothless Vampire is a 2020 animated children's film, directed by Ali Soltanian Fard Jahromi and starring Zahra Yasmin Soltanian, Zakiyah Soltanian Fard Jahromi, and Ali Soltanian Fard Jahromi. It tells the story of a teenage Vampire called Vampria who is bullied for missing her vampire teeth and her realisation of the meaning of bullying. The story is centred around the idea of bullying and Vampria's mission to create peace between vampires and humans through information about vampire origins and finding an alternative to drinking blood. The film also features Fatimah Soltanian Fard Jahromi, Mustafa Soltanian Fard Jahromi. The film won several awards and the 12 year old director and 10 year old story writer were interviewed by Radio New Zealand.

== Plot ==
The film begins with a teenage vampire called Vampria chasing a girl. After capturing the girl she fails to bite and suck her blood because she is missing her vampire teeth. Frustrated, she goes back home. some of her peers start mocking her for missing her vampire teeth. From the conversation it seems the bullies led by a girl knows about Vampria's missing teeth. Vampria goes home crying.

The next day she wakes up to go to the Vampire High School. Other students raise the question of whether Vampria can be a real vampire without teeth. Vampria constantly has nightmares about getting bullied for not having teeth affecting her punctuality when going to school. While studying the difference between vampires and humans and the vampires' sensitivity to sunlight she wonders what has made vampires and humans different. In School she meets the friendly Vambro who offers his assistance to help her. They meet up the next day when Vambro teaches her to standup to her bullies and the lead bully backs off. But Vampria still has nightmares about being bullied and the head comes up to bully her with her minions.

Vampria thinks about her bullies while at the same time getting reminded of a few days before when she was chasing a girl to suck her blood. She realises that vampires are bullying humans by drinking their blood and runs to school to tell Vambro about her discovery. Vambro offers to take her to old ruins outside of the city where they can discover the origin of vampires. After finding several thousand year old books, Vampria and Vambro discover that a thousand years ago a group of people known as vampires used to be able to be out in the sun. After starting to drink blood of humans they developed the side-effect of being sensitive to sunlight. Vampria tells Vambro that they must inform everyone about their findings. After traversing the dangerous journey back the two of them set out to find an alternative to drinking human blood. Through experimentation, Vampria realises that pomegranate juice is an alternative. Armed with all the knowledge of her discoveries, Vampria gathers the vampires and announces her findings and asks all vampires to stop bullying humans and to start drinking pomegranate juice instead. Most vampires agree. They meet up with humans who are more than happy to make peace with the vampires and humans and vampires celebrate together. At the celebrations Vampria notices a baby vampire being bullied for not having any teeth and scolds the new bully. The next day when Vampria returns to school the bully and her minions attempt to mock Vampria for having no teeth but Vampria with a confident look proclaims, "Not this time!"

== Cast ==
- Zahra Yasmin Soltanian as Vampria the toothless teenage vampire
- Zakiyah Soltanian Fard Jahromi as the bully
- Ali Soltanian Fard Jahromi as Vambro
- Fatimah Soltanian Fard Jahromi as the little girl
- Mustafa Soltanian Fard Jahromi as the little vampire with no teeth

== Theme ==
The main theme of the film is bullying where the main protagonist realises through being bullied that she too is a bully.

== Production ==
Vampria: The Toothless Vampire was entirely animated and edited by Ali Soltanian Fard Jahromi who was 12 years old at the time of the movie's release. The story was written by the director's 10-year-old sister Fatimah Soltanian Fard Jahromi.

== Screening and awards ==
The film was screened at The International Vampire Film and Art Festival and on Amazon Prime. The film won 17 and Younger and Children, Family Programming award in the Accolade Global Film Competition and Best Young Film Maker award from Independent Short Awards.
