= Twins of Evil =

1971 British horror film directed by John Hough

Twins of Evil (a.k.a. Twins of Dracula)
- American Theatrical release poster
- Directed by: John Hough
- Screenplay by: Tudor Gates
- Based on: characters by Sheridan Le Fanu
- Produced by: Michael Style; Harry Fine
- Starring: Peter Cushing; Dennis Price; Madeleine Collinson; Mary Collinson; Isobel Black; Kathleen Byron; Damien Thomas; David Warbeck
- Cinematography: Dick Bush
- Edited by: Spencer Reeve
- Music by: Harry Robertson
- Production company: Hammer Film Productions
- Distributed by: Rank Film Distributors (UK); Universal Pictures (US)
- Release dates: 17 October 1971 (UK); 15 June 1972 (US)
- Running time: 87 minutes
- Country: United Kingdom
- Language: English
- Budget: £205,067

Twins of Evil (also known as Twins of Dracula) is a 1971 British horror film directed by John Hough and starring Peter Cushing, with Damien Thomas, real-life identical twins: former Playboy Playmates Madeleine and Mary Collinson, Isobel Black, Kathleen Byron, Dennis Price and David Warbeck. This was the Collinson sisters' final acting roles.

It is the third (and final) film in the Karnstein Trilogy, based on the 1872 novella Carmilla by Sheridan Le Fanu. The film has the least resemblance to the novella and adds a witchfinding theme to the vampire story. Much of the interest of the film revolves around the contrasting evil and good natures of two beautiful sisters, Frieda and Maria. Unlike the previous two entries in the series, this film contains only a brief lesbian element.

The film was released in the U.S. as a double feature with Hands of the Ripper.

== Plot ==
Set in historical Styria, identical twin sisters Maria and Frieda Gelhorn move from Venice to Karnstein in Central Europe to live with their uncle Gustav Weil after recently becoming orphaned. Weil is a stern Puritan and leader of the fanatical witch-hunting 'Brotherhood'. Both twins resent their uncle's sternness and one of them, Frieda, looks for a way to escape. Resenting her uncle, she becomes fascinated by the local Count Karnstein, who has the reputation of being "a wicked man".

Count Karnstein, who enjoys the Emperor's favour and thus remains untouched by the Brotherhood, is indeed wicked and interested in Satanism and black magic. Trying to emulate his evil ancestors, he murders a girl as a human sacrifice, calling forth the vampiress Countess Mircalla Karnstein from her grave. Mircalla turns the Count into a vampire.

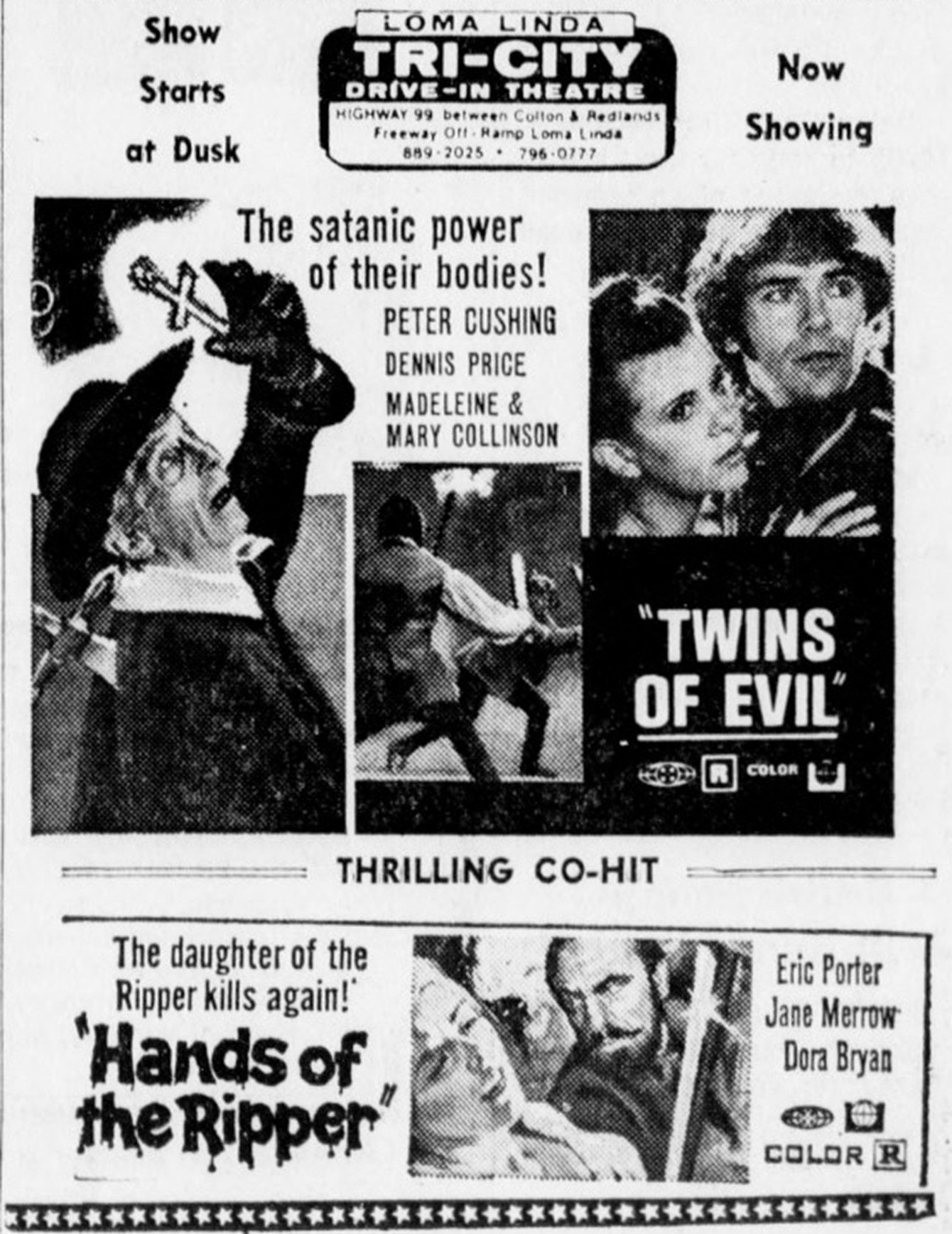
Drive-in advertisement from 1972 for Twins of Evil and co-feature, Hands of the Ripper.

Frieda, following an invitation from the Count, steals away to the castle at night, while Maria covers for her absence. In the castle, the Count transforms Frieda into a vampire, offering her a beautiful young chained victim. Returning home, Frieda threatens Maria to keep covering for her nightly excursions, but she also secretly fears she might bite Maria, who would not survive due to her innocent nature.

Meanwhile, Maria becomes interested in the handsome young teacher, Anton, who is initially infatuated with the more mysterious Frieda. Anton has studied what he calls "superstition", but becomes convinced of the existence of vampires when his sister falls victim to one. One night, when Frieda attacks a member of the Brotherhood, she is captured by her uncle and put in jail. While the Brotherhood debates the vampire woman's fate, the Count and his servants kidnap Maria and exchange her for Frieda in the jail cell. Anton goes to see Maria, not knowing that she is actually Frieda. She tries to seduce him, but he sees her lack of reflection in a mirror and repels her with a cross. Anton rushes to rescue Maria from a burning. Maria kisses a cross, revealing her innocence.

Weil now listens to Anton's advice on hunting vampires, and the two men lead the Brotherhood and the villagers to Castle Karnstein to destroy the Count. The Count and Frieda attempt to flee, but they are surprised by Weil who captures Frieda and decapitates her. The Count captures Maria, but Weil appears with an axe. Weil challenges the Count and is killed. Anton seizes his chance and pierces the Count's heart with a spear. Maria and Anton reunite while Karnstein crumbles to corruption.

== Cast ==
- Peter Cushing as Gustav Weil
- Kathleen Byron as Katy Weil
- Mary Collinson as Maria Gellhorn
- Madeleine Collinson as Frieda Gellhorn
- Damien Thomas as Count Karnstein
- David Warbeck as Anton Hoffer
- Dennis Price as Dietrich
- Katya Wyeth as Countess Mircalla Karnstein
- Roy Stewart as Joachim
- Isobel Black as Ingrid Hoffer
- Harvey Hall as Franz
- Alex Scott as Hermann
- Shelagh Wilcox as lady in coach
- Inigo Jackson as woodman
- Judy Matheson as woodman's daughter
- Kirsten Lindholm as young girl at the stake
- Luan Peters as Gerta
- Peter Thompson as gaoler

== Production ==
The film was financed by the Rank Organisation.

Hammer was originally going to make a film called Vampire Virgins; however, producer Harry Fine saw a Playboy spread involving the Collinson twins and decided to make a film focusing on them.

Ingrid Pitt was again offered the part of Countess Mircalla Karnstein but refused.

The same sets were used for Vampire Circus.

Harvey Hall and Kirsten Lindholm appear in all three films of the trilogy, although in different roles in each one. Peter Cushing also played one of the leads in the first, The Vampire Lovers (a part was written for Cushing in the second film, but he dropped out of the production due to the illness of his wife. The role was taken over by Ralph Bates). Luan Peters, who plays a small role in this film, also appeared in the second film, Lust for a Vampire, as did Judy Matheson.

The original film included a short scene, later cut, in which the evil twin approaches her uncle. The scene is out of place as their uncle is busy burning the other sister; somehow he teleports back home and the evil twin gives him a show. Cut out for American audiences and possibly to maintain continuity. The original scene was aired on public television in the 1980s.

Music for the film was composed by the British composer Harry Robinson.

The castle shown in the film to represent Karnstein Castle is the famous Hochosterwitz Castle in Austria, which was also used in the Hammer film Lust for a Vampire.

== Critical reception ==
The Monthly Film Bulletin wrote: "The repressive austerity of the Puritans' life style – the bare oak walls of the meeting house and Weil's home, Cushing's ascetic features and clipped delivery – provides a running contrast to the high Gothic of Don Mingaye's lavish baronial set for Karnstein Castle, replete with mists, shadows and colour filter effects. ...Where Tudor Gates' previous Le Fanu adaptations (The Vampire Lovers, Lust for a Vampire) provided only the most anaemic opposition to their heroines' atrocities, in Twins of Evil the crusader role is interestingly transferred to the strong but morally equivocal Puritans, and as a result the film provides a study in opposites which never resolves simplistically into Good and Evil. John Hough's direction underlines the fanaticism on both sides ... and also gets full value from the script's Gothic set-pieces. The reincarnation of Countess Mircalla, an ectoplasmic shape rising from the sarcophagus and floating in hooded silence towards the terrified Karnstein, is a tour de force. And though Twins of Evil has its share of the usual Hammer deficiencies – insipid juveniles and some over-familiar Pinewood locations – it is easily the best of their vampire films for some time."

Film critic Leonard Maltin gave the film two and a half stars, calling it "engaging" and "inspired" in its use of the Collinson twins.

A. H. Weiler wrote in The New York Times that the Collinson twins made the film interesting, but "The rest of the costumed crew ... hardly give Twins of Evil a good name."

In Cinefantastique Robert L. Jerome observed: "The film is done with Hammer's obvious care for details and a sobriety which creates the proper mood of unexpected evil in attractive, tranquil surroundings."

== In other media ==
A novelisation of the film was written by Shaun Hutson and published by Arrow Publishing in association with Hammer and the Random House Group in 2011, ISBN 978-0-09-955619-0. The book contains an introduction by the film's director, John Hough.

The film was adapted into an 18-page comic strip for the January–February 1977 issue of the magazine House of Hammer (vol. 1) #7, published by General Book Distribution. It was drawn by Blas Gallego from a script by Chris Lowder. The cover of the issue featured a painting by Brian Lewis based on imagery from the film.

Australian indie rock band Turnstyle used a sample of Karnstein summoning Satan in their 1999 song "Winter Rodeo".

== See also ==
- Vampire films
