= Katya Wyeth =

British model and actress (born 1948)

- Born: Katya Wyeth; 1 January 1948 (age 78); Essex, England, UK
- Occupation: Actress
- Years active: 1964–1977

Katya Wyeth (born 1 January 1948) is a former model and actress notable for her roles in several classic horror films of the early 1970s. She was married to British actor Michael Bangerter, with whom she had two children.

Credited early on as Kathja Wyeth, she began her theatre career as a stage manager at the Theatre Royal, Windsor from 1966-67. In 1968 she made her West End debut as Lucienne in a revival of the Alan Melville play Dear Charles, She was Miss Budapest in Randall and Hopkirk deceased, 1968, then in 1971 she appeared in Rabelais at the London Roundhouse, directed by Jean-Louis Barrault.

On screen, she frolicked with Alex (Malcolm MacDowell) in the 'Ascot fantasy' sequence that closes A Clockwork Orange. She also appeared in two first season episodes of Monty Python's Flying Circus, as a hostess on the TV quiz show The Sky's the Limit, in the 1973 Play for Today Shakespeare or Bust, and in episodes of both Special Branch and The Sweeney.

Her appearances for Hammer Film Productions include Hands of the Ripper and Straight on Till Morning, but she is probably best remembered as Countess Mircalla in another film for the same company, Twins of Evil.

== Selected filmography ==
- Inspector Clouseau (1968; as Kathja Wyeth)
- Monty Python's Flying Circus (TV series) (1969; as Katya Wyeth in Owl Stretching Time, Kathja Wyeth in Full Frontal Nudity)
- A Clockwork Orange (1971)
- Hands of the Ripper (1971)
- Twins of Evil (1971)
- Straight on Till Morning (1972)
- Kindly Leave the Kerb (1971, TV series)
- Burke & Hare (1972; as Katya Wyath)
- Barry McKenzie Holds His Own (1974)
- Confessions of a Window Cleaner (1974)
- Got It Made (1974)
- I'm Not Feeling Myself Tonight (1976)
- No. 1 of the Secret Service (1977)
