= Crescendo (1970 film) =

1970 British film by Alan Gibson

- UK quad film poster
- Directed by: Alan Gibson
- Screenplay by: Jimmy Sangster; Alfred Shaughnessy
- Produced by: Michael Carreras
- Starring: Stefanie Powers; James Olson; Margaretta Scott; Jane Lapotaire; Joss Ackland
- Cinematography: Paul Beeson
- Edited by: Chris Barnes
- Music by: Malcolm Williamson
- Production company: Hammer Film Productions
- Distributed by: Warner Bros. Pictures
- Release dates: 7 June 1970 (UK); 10 November 1972 (US)
- Running time: 95 minutes
- Country: United Kingdom
- Languages: English; French
- Budget: £302,000

Crescendo is a 1970 British horror psychological thriller film directed by Alan Gibson and starring Stefanie Powers, James Olson, Margaretta Scott, Jane Lapotaire and Joss Ackland. It was written by Jimmy Sangster and Alfred Shaughnessy and made by Hammer Film Productions.

== Plot ==
Drawn to the spectacular south of France to research the late composer Henry Ryman, music student Susan Roberts encounters his son, drug-addicted Georges and his eccentric family. Investigating the haunting strains of an unfinished Ryman concerto leads Susan to discover an empty piano and a brutally savaged mannequin. Georges tells her she is the lookalike of his lost love. But Susan may not be the only one at the villa with an eerie doppelgänger.

== Cast ==
- Stefanie Powers as Susan Roberts
- James Olson as Georges Ryman / Jacques Ryman
- Margaretta Scott as Danielle Ryman
- Jane Lapotaire as Lillianne
- Joss Ackland as Carter
- Kirsten Lindholm as Catherine (credired as Kirsten Betts)

== Production ==
Alfred Shaughnessy wrote the script in the mid-'60s. In 1966, Michael Reeves approached Hammer Films with the script. James Carreras tried for two years to make it with Joan Crawford but could not get financing. In 1969, the project was reactivated, with Jimmy Sangster hired to rewrite the script and Alan Gibson to direct.

== Release ==
Crescendo premiered in London on 7 May 1970 at the New Victoria Theatre. It received a general release on 7 June 1970 by Warner-Pathé in double feature with Taste the Blood of Dracula. It was distributed in the United States by Warner Bros Pictures on November 29, 1972.

== Reception ==
=== Box office ===
Its performance at the box office was disappointing.

=== Critical ===
The Monthly Film Bulletin wrote: "Another Hammer horror, and within its own terms quite a spirited offering. Given a plot somewhere between Fanatic and Taste of Fear director Alan Gibson has injected a gratuitous amount of sex into the story but otherwise presents the usual mixture with a sure style and a good eye for colour. The dream sequences – like Georges' nightmarish premonition that his insane brother will eventually kill him – are particularly effective. The dialogue does creak somewhat, but the next Hammer surprise is never very far away: even the butler turns out to have been a frequent inmate of asylums, though he seems about as normal as anyone else in the film. Jane Lapotaire overacts rather gratingly as the maid, but Margaretta Scott moves from sanity to insanity with gracious ease, and Stephanie Powers is an attractive heroine, though the thesis never gets very far."

The Radio Times Guide to Films gave the film 3/5 stars, writing: "This "mini-Hitchcock" thriller from Hammer Films borrows as much from Psycho as it does from the studio's own series of early 1960s whodunnits (Paranoiac, for example). Touted as a new departure for the "House of Horror", this demented tale of dead composers, lunatic twins and drug-addicted cripples merely adds sex and discreet nudity to the tried-and-tested shocker formula. If you can swallow Stefanie Powers as a PhD music student, this one's for you."

Leslie Halliwell wrote "Lunatic Hammer horror with the courage of its shameless borrowings from Taste of Fear, Fanatic, Nightmare, Maniac and all the films about mad twin brothers, to which this chaotic brew adds dollops of sex and heroin addiction."

In Hammer Films: An Exhaustive Filmography, Johnson and Del Vecchio wrote: "Not much could have improved Crescendo, which was critically injured from its inception. It had all been done before, and better."

== Home media ==
The film was released to DVD by the Warner Archive Collection in March 2009.

== Sources ==
- Fellner, Chris (2019). The Encyclopedia of Hammer Films. Rowman & Littlefield. ISBN 978-1538126592.
