= Bloodsucking Cinema =

- Original language: English

Production
- Running time: 56 minutes
- Production company: Anchor Bay Entertainment

Original release
- Release: October 26, 2007

Bloodsucking Cinema is a 2007 documentary film about vampire films and it has horror directors talking about the genre. It is an Anchor Bay Entertainment film and it aired on Starz' Fear Fest.
