= The Vampire Lovers =

1970 film by Roy Ward Baker

- Theatrical release poster
- Directed by: Roy Ward Baker
- Screenplay by: Tudor Gates
- Adaptation by: Harry Fine; Tudor Gates; Michael Style
- Based on: Carmilla by Sheridan Le Fanu
- Produced by: Harry Fine; Michael Style
- Starring: Ingrid Pitt; George Cole; Kate O'Mara; Peter Cushing; Ferdy Mayne; Douglas Wilmer; Dawn Addams
- Cinematography: Moray Grant
- Edited by: James Needs
- Music by: Harry Robinson
- Production companies: Hammer Film Productions; American International Pictures; Fantale Films
- Distributed by: MGM-EMI Distributors (United Kingdom); American International Pictures (United States)
- Release dates: 3 September 1970 (London); 4 October 1970 (United Kingdom); 28 October 1970 (Chicago)
- Running time: 91 minutes (United Kingdom); 89 minutes (United States)
- Countries: United Kingdom; United States
- Language: English
- Budget: £165,227

The Vampire Lovers is a 1970 Gothic horror film directed by Roy Ward Baker and starring Ingrid Pitt, George Cole, Kate O'Mara, Peter Cushing, Ferdy Mayne, Douglas Wilmer and Dawn Addams. A co-production between Hammer Film Productions and American International Pictures, it is based on the 1872 Sheridan Le Fanu novella Carmilla and is the first film in the Karnstein Trilogy, the other two films being Lust for a Vampire and Twins of Evil (both 1971). The three films were somewhat daring for the time in explicitly depicting lesbian themes.

== Plot ==
In Styria, 1794, a female vampire in a diaphanous gown materialises from a misty graveyard and kills a man she lures out of a tavern. While returning to her grave, she finds her shroud missing. She is thus forced to face Baron Hartog, a vampire hunter who was stalking her in order to avenge the death of his sister. He decapitates her.

Decades later, Austrian General Spielsdorf is throwing a ball in his estate to celebrate the birthday of his niece, Laura. A countess, who has recently moved into the general's neighbouring property, is in attendance with her daughter Marcilla. After talking with a mysterious man in black, the countess tells the general she has to go visit a sick friend and asks him to care for Marcilla in her absence. Despite Marcilla's strange demeanour, Laura befriends her. Marcilla seems to be sexually attracted to her new friend. Laura starts experiencing disturbing nightmares where she is attacked by a giant cat, then dies of a gradual anemia. On her breasts, two puncture wounds are discovered. Marcilla disappears, and General Spielsdorf leaves to find Baron Hartog.

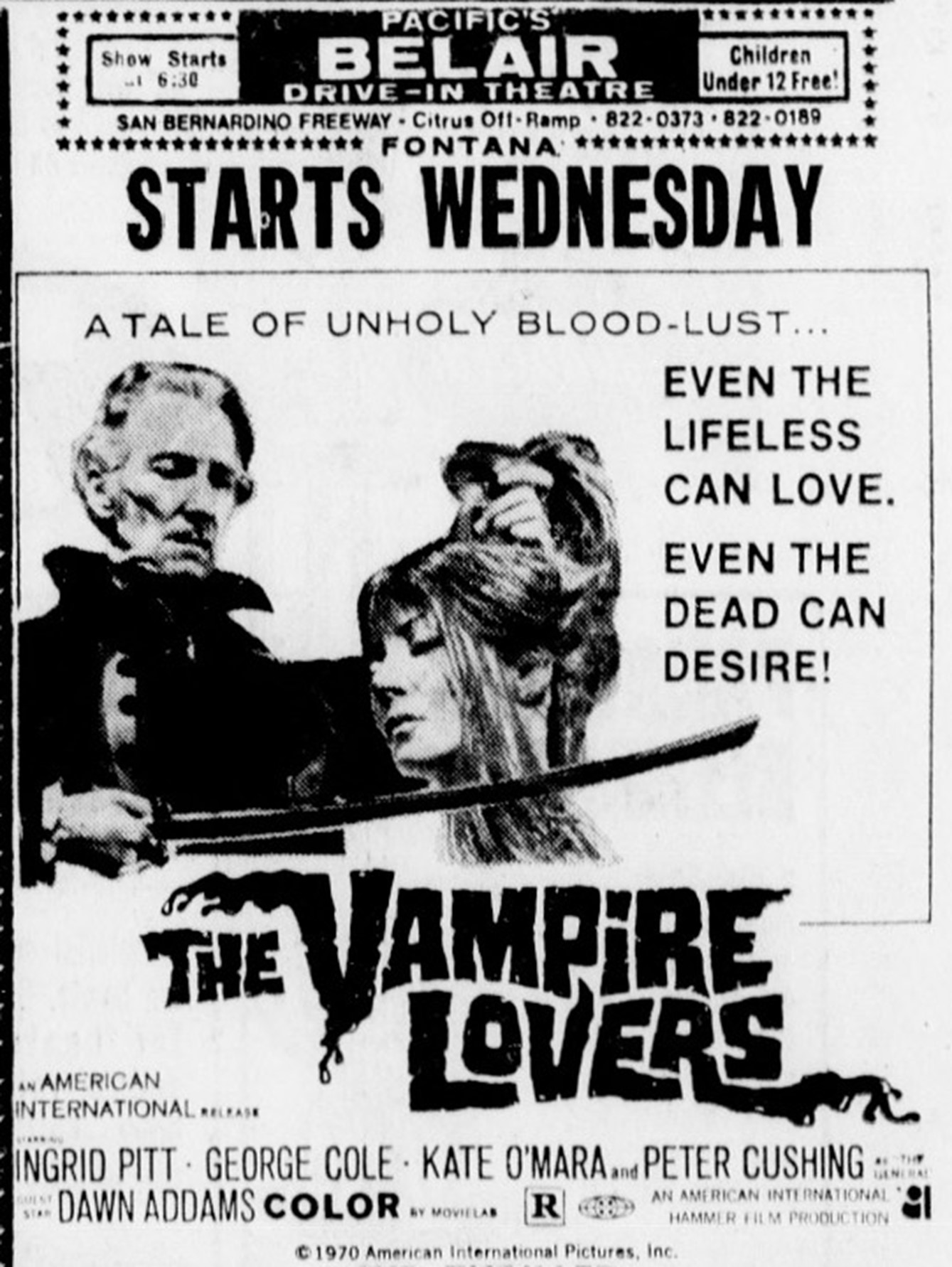
Drive-in advertisement from 1970

Marcilla, now going by the alias "Carmilla", is reunited with the countess. They stage a carriage breakdown near the residence of Mr Morton, a wealthy Englishman living in Styria and a friend of the general's. Once again, the countess manipulates Mr Morton into offering hospitality to her alleged relative (this time introduced as her niece). Carmilla later attempts to seduce Morton's daughter Emma, who resists her more romantic overtures. Emma also falls ill and starts suffering from nightmares of the giant cat, while her breasts show the same wounds as Laura. After Emma's father has to leave on a business trip to Vienna, Emma's governess, Mademoiselle Perrodot, is seduced by Carmilla and becomes her accomplice after sleeping with her. Meanwhile, Carmilla has started feeding on people from the nearby village, causing several mysterious deaths where the corpses are drained of all blood.

Morton's butler, Renton, learns about local vampire superstitions and enlists the help of the doctor who had already treated Laura. They use garlic flowers and crucifixes to ward off their suspected supernatural evil, away from Emma, who is now dying.

Carmilla kills the doctor on the road. She then seduces and subjugates Renton, who was under the impression the only real vampire was Mademoiselle Perrodot. With Renton under her control, Carmilla manages to have the wards removed. Knowing she has been discovered, she dispatches Renton, with the intention of retreating into her grave and taking Emma with her as her lover.

Morton, who was called home by Renton, meets General Spielsdorf and Baron Hartog, who were on their way to the ruins of Karnstein Castle, along with Laura's fiancé Carl. Hartog reveals the Karnsteins were a family of vampires from the 16th century. In his youth, he managed to destroy nearly all of them, starting with the female vampire who had killed his sister. However, he could not find the grave of Mircalla Karnstein. Looking at her portrait in the castle hall, Spielsdorf and Morton realise she is the same girl they separately know as Marcilla and Carmilla. Carl makes haste and rides back to Morton's to rescue Emma.

As Mircalla prepares to leave with Emma, Mademoiselle Perrodot begs to be taken with her. Mircalla kills and drains her instead. Carl arrives and chases Mircalla away using a poignard as a cross. Mircalla dematerialises and flees to Karnstein Castle, where the Baron and the others await her return. Once located in her resting coffin, General Spielsdorf drives a stake into Carmilla's heart and cuts off her head, thus avenging his daughter's death. Emma is freed of the vampire's sickness and influence. Meanwhile, the image of Mircalla in her portrait on the wall turns into a fanged skeleton.

A mysterious man in black watches all these events unfold from a distance, occasionally laughing with contempt.

== Cast ==
- Ingrid Pitt as Marcilla/Carmilla/Mircalla Karnstein
- Pippa Steel as Laura Spielsdorf
- Madeline Smith as Emma Morton
- Peter Cushing as General Spielsdorf
- George Cole as Roger Morton
- Dawn Addams as the Countess
- Kate O'Mara as the governess, Mademoiselle Perrodot
- Douglas Wilmer as Baron Joachim von Hartog
- Jon Finch as Carl Ebhardt
- Ferdy Mayne as the doctor
- Kirsten Betts as the first vampire (the blonde woman)
- John Forbes-Robertson as the man in black
- Shelagh Wilcocks as the housekeeper
- Harvey Hall as Renton, the butler
- Janet Key as Gretchin, the maid
- Charles Farrell as the landlord

== Production ==
The film was a co-production between Hammer Film Productions and American International Pictures (AIP), who were interested in a vampire film with more explicit sexual content to take advantage of a more relaxed censorship environment. It was decided to adapt Carmilla. Harry Fine and Michael Style were the two producers. They formed a company, Fantale, along with writer Tudor Gates.

Harry Fine's wife knew Nat Cohen who introduced them to James Carreras. Fine suggested they film Carmilla. Tudor Gates said Carreras was enthusiastic and he sold it "instantly" to AIP based on the poster.

Before production, the script of The Vampire Lovers was sent to the chief censor, John Trevelyan, who warned the studio about depictions of lesbianism, pointing out that a previous lesbian film, The Killing of Sister George, had had five minutes excised by his office. In response, Hammer replied that the lesbianism was not of their doing, but was present in the original story by Le Fanu. Trevelyan backed down as a result.

Production of The Vampire Lovers began at Elstree Studios on 19 January 1970 and used locations in the grounds of Moor Park Mansion, Hertfordshire (standing in for Styria, Central Europe). Produced on a relatively low budget of £165,227, it was the final Hammer film to be financed with American money—most of the later films were backed by Rank or EMI. Gates thought AIP gave Hammer $400,000 so "Jimmy had change left over". He said Fantale, his company with Fine and Styles, had a 25% profit stake (which was very lucrative).

While filming the scene in which Carmilla attacks Madame Perrodot, Ingrid Pitt's fangs kept falling out of her mouth and dropping into Kate O'Mara's cleavage, prompting gales of uncontrollable laughter from both actresses. Finally, Pitt grabbed some chewing gum from the mouth of one of the crew members and used it to secure her fangs.

== Home media ==
The Vampire Lovers was released on 26 August 2003 on DVD by MGM Home Video (Fox Video) as a double-sided Midnite Movies Double Feature DVD consisting of both The Vampire Lovers and Countess Dracula (1971). Scream Factory released the film on Blu-ray on 30 April 2013 and a "Collector's Edition" was released with a new 4K scan of the original camera negative on 21 December 2021.

== Critical reception ==
Variety's review of the film was mixed, claiming the story was not great and it had "fairly flat dialog", but the script had "all the needed ingredients".

A. H. Weiler of The New York Times called it "a departure from the hackneyed bloody norm. ... professionally directed, opulently staged and sexy to boot".

The Monthly Film Bulletin declared, "Rather below par, even by recent Hammer standards, this involves the customary heavy breathing, lusty fangs and tolerably luxurious sets, with the innovation of an exposed nipple or two to support the lesbian angle."

Dave Kehr wrote a favourable retrospective review for the Chicago Reader, writing that the film "resulted from the last significant surge of creative energy at Britain's Hammer Films, which thereafter descended into abject self-parody". Film critic Leonard Maltin gave the film a passing grade of two-and-a-half stars, calling it a "[r]ather erotic Hammer chiller".

Filmink called it "a hugely entertaining movie, led by Pitt’s balls-to-the-wall performance... managing to be attractive, scary, and emphatic. It remains among the most iconic performance – if not the most iconic performance – by a female in Hammer horror."

Donald Guarisco of AllMovie wrote, "This Hammer Films production isn't their finest moment but its easy to understand why it has become an enduring cult favorite with horror fans: The Vampire Lovers pushes the 'bloodshed & bosoms' formula of the Hammer hits to its limit". On the review aggregator website Rotten Tomatoes, the film holds an approval rating of 76% based on 17 reviews, with an average rating of 5.8/10.

== See also ==
- Vampire film
