= Kirsten Lindholm =

Danish-American actress and healing practitioner

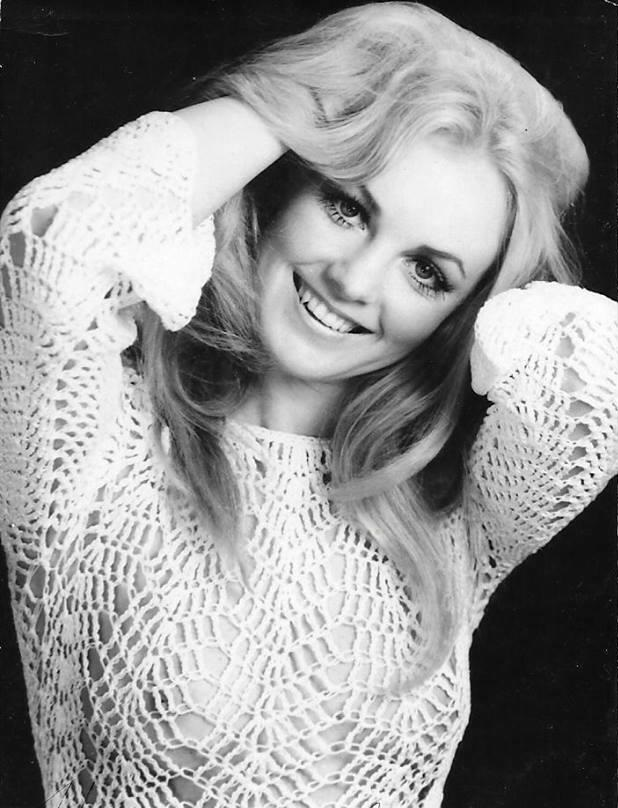
- Lindholm in 1970
- Born: Kirsten Lindholm Andreassen; 1 September 1943 (age 83); Odense, Denmark
- Other names: Kirsten Betts; Elandra Kirsten Meredith; Vikram Kaur Khalsa
- Occupations: Actress; healing practitioner; yoga instructor
- Years active: 1969–1971 (as actress)
- Spouse(s): Vic Briggs (m.?; died 2021)

Kirsten Lindholm (born Kirsten Lindholm Andreassen; 1 September 1943) is a former model and a film actress known for her roles in Hammer horror movies, in which she first appeared as Kirsten Betts. She is now a yoga instructor and performer currently living in New Zealand and is now known as Elandra Kirsten Meredith and by the Sikh religious name Vikram Kaur Khalsa (Punjabi: ਵਿਕਰਮ ਕੌਰ ਖਾਲਸਾ).

She was born in Odense, Denmark, and was raised in New Zealand, where she won prizes for ballroom dancing. While majoring in languages at Auckland University, she acted in several plays.

In the late 1960s and early 1970s, as Kirsten Betts and then Kirsten Lindholm, she was an actress and model. She appeared in a London play called Pyjama Tops (1969), in the movie Zeta One (1969), and then in four Hammer horror movies: The Vampire Lovers (1970), in which her character is beheaded before the opening titles and during filming for which she appeared as one of a "[v]ampire quintet" on the cover of ABC Film Review, Crescendo (1970), Twins of Evil (1971), where her role has been cited as an example of psychological violence, and Lust for a Vampire (1971).

At a yoga class in England, she met Vic Briggs, who had converted to Sikhism and taken the name Vikram Singh; they fell in love and married after moving to California, and she took the Sikh religious name Vikram Kaur Khalsa. They ran a Sikh ashram in San Diego. After living in Hawaii, where she worked as a healing practitioner and founded Ho'omana Ke Laka Healing workshops, she and her husband moved in 2008 to the Hibiscus Coast, New Zealand, where they both taught yoga. She also sang backup for her husband on his One in the Goddess album. Briggs died in 2021.

== Filmography ==
=== Television ===
- Doctor in the House (5 episodes, 1970) as Ingrid
- UFO (1 episode "Timelash", 1971)
- Birds on the Wing (1 episode, 1971) as Ingrid
- The Persuaders! (1 episode "Angie, Angie", 1971) as Marissa Nave
- The Golden Shot (4 episodes, 1971) as Herself, Maid of the Month

=== Film ===
- Zeta One (1969) as Angvisa Girl
- Julius Caesar (1970) as slavegirl
- Crescendo (1970) as Catherine
- The Vampire Lovers (1970) as 1st Vampire
- Lust for a Vampire (1971) as Peasant Girl
- Twins of Evil (1971) as Young Girl at Stake

== See also ==
- Amritdhari
