= Pippa Steel =

British actress (1948–1992)

- Born: 15 April 1948; Flensburg, Germany
- Died: 29 May 1992 (aged 44); London, England
- Occupation: Actress
- Years active: 1962–1989

Pippa Steel (15 April 1948, Flensburg, Germany – 29 May 1992) was a British actress best known for her roles in two Hammer horror films: The Vampire Lovers (1970) and Lust for a Vampire (1971). Also one appearance in TV series Public Eye (1971)

== Career ==
Her other films included Stranger in the House (1967), Take a Girl Like You (1970) and Young Winston (1972). She was also active in television, with guest appearances in series Department S, Z-Cars, UFO, Public Eye, The Adventurer and Blake's 7. She also appeared in the 1986 BBC sitcom Dear John written by John Sullivan. She appeared in the pilot episode A Singular Man as Fay the AA counsellor.

== Death ==
She died in London in 1992 from cancer, aged 44,

== Filmography ==
Year	Title	Role	Notes
1967	Stranger in the House	Sue Phillips	
1969	Take a Girl Like You	Ted	
1969	Oh! What a Lovely War	Scoreboard Girl	Uncredited
1970	The Vampire Lovers	Laura	
1971	Lust for a Vampire	Susan Pelley	
1972	Young Winston	Clementine Hozier	
