= The Brigand of Kandahar =

1965 British film by John Gilling

- UK theatrical poster
- Directed by: John Gilling
- Written by: John Gilling (original story and screenplay)
- Produced by: Anthony Nelson Keys
- Starring: Ronald Lewis; Oliver Reed; Duncan Lamont
- Cinematography: Reginald H. Wyer (as Reg Wyer)
- Edited by: Tom Simpson
- Music by: Don Banks
- Production companies: Associated British Picture Corporation; Hammer Film Productions
- Distributed by: Warner-Pathe (UK); Columbia Pictures (US)
- Release dates: 9 August 1965 (UK); November 1965 (USA)
- Running time: 81 minutes
- Country: United Kingdom
- Language: English

The Brigand of Kandahar is a 1965 British adventure film directed by John Gilling and starring Ronald Lewis, Oliver Reed and Duncan Lamont. Case, a British Indian Army officer, is discharged from his regiment after being accused of cowardice. He then joins a group of Indian brigands on a quest to capture a British fort. It was one of a number of British films made during an era that featured foreign warriors as their protagonists. It was filmed with extensive footage from Zarak.

It was the last lead role in a feature film for Ronald Lewis.

== Plot ==
Lt Case is a mixed-race officer of the Bengal Lancers operation in northern India.

In 1850 on the North West Frontier of India, in the bordering region of modern Afghanistan, a British garrison seethes with boredom. The mixed-race Lieutenant Case has been having an affair with a fellow officer's wife, Elsa, who is persuaded to end the relationship. Lieutenant Case reports back to his regiment following a sortie where a fellow officer is captured by local bandits. Coincidentally, the captured officer is Elsa's husband and Case ends up facing charges of cowardice. The show trial results in his dishonourable discharge and a 10-year prison term. With help from the tribesmen, Case escapes and flees into the mountains where he falls into the hands of Eli Khan, the leader of the brigands.

Case and Khan make a deal whereby Khan grants sanctuary and the chance of vengeance and Case agrees to train the brigands to storm the British fort. Case struggles between his British upbringing and his new position and insists that Khan will not harm civilians captured. As Khan tortures his prisoners including the captured British officer, Case struggles to contain his emotions. In the background lurks Eli Khan's mysterious sister, Ratina. Eli Khan leaves their mountain fastness on a scouting mission.

A roving British newspaper correspondent James Marriott arrives at the fort having heard about the court-martial of Case. He speaks to Elsa who brushes him off thinking he is only interested in the scurrilous tale of the affair. Colonel Drewe seeks to track down the whereabouts of Eli Khan's hiding place through raiding the local villages. The junior officers alternatively threaten and promise to reward the peasants but no information is forthcoming. Colonel Drewe takes charge and promises to shoot one unless he is told the location of the brigands. After a warning shot, the peasant relents and gives up the cave's site. Volunteers are called for to lead a raid up a narrow unguarded path and Marriott begs permission to accompany them.

The raiding party is ambushed and the survivors, including Marriott are captured and taken as prisoners in front of Case who warns them not to attempt to escape or be killed. Marriott attempts to understand Case's character but finds him inscrutable, particularly when Case can no longer bear the suffering of his imprisoned maimed former comrade and shoots him. After one of the sepoys is shot attempting to escape, Case sends Marriott to the fort with a message to the colonel guaranteeing the safety of any civilians who evacuate.

Colonel Drewe is persuaded by Marriott's vouchsafing of Case's intentions and sends the civilians to safety with a small escort. Ratina senses something with Case's guarantee is amiss and overrules Case in her brother's absence, leading an ambush of the evacuating civilians when they pause to rest. During the fighting, Marriott is knocked unconscious. The sole prisoner is Elsa who is brought back to the cave and claimed by Case, causing Ratina to look on enviously. Eli Khan returns from his scouting mission saying that British reinforcements are on the way and that they must attack tomorrow. Ratina jealously boasts of Elsa who is brought before Khan who also claims her as his prize. Case tries to protect her. Khan insists they fight for the right to dispose of Elsa. During the fight she flees and finds a now conscious Marriot who steals mounts and they ride back to the fort together and warn the British of the imminent brigand attack. Eli Khan is eventually throttled by Case who succeeds him as chief of the Ghilzi. Case shares an intimate moment with Ratina whilst the brigands bear Khan's body away.

The next day the brigands ride to the fort and are ambushed by the British. Despite a charge by the mounted brigands, the concentrated British fire proves too much for them. As the brigands fall back, the Bengal Lancers come into play in a cavalry charge. This scene features background footage from Zarak spliced with new footage.

Case is injured by Drewe's bullet and as the tide turns is urged to flee upon a retainer's horse. He returns to their cave but is followed by Colonel Drewe, his colour sergeant and a file of men. Colonel Drewe follows the bloody trail of Case who has climbed up a promontory and sends his sepoys after him. A short revolver battle ensues between Drewe and the outnumbered Case. Ratina emerges behind the British and futilely tries to save Case by opening fire on the British line. As Case and Ratina are both mortally wounded, they reach out and touch hands.

The scene cuts back to the fort as Marriott is interviewed about his forthcoming article by Colonel Drewe. Marriott is scathing of Drewe and recognises the racist treatment of a once promising officer, Case "whose shade of skin set the seal on his betrayal." Marriott talks about the common soldiers and finishes his recollections by saying "I will write about the brave men but not you. That's something worth writing about, don't you think? Goodbye Colonel." The film finishes with British reinforcements streaming through the streets to the sounds of the Bugle.

== Cast ==
- Ronald Lewis as Case
- Oliver Reed as Ali Khan
- Duncan Lamont as Colonel Drewe
- Yvonne Romain as Ratina
- Katherine Woodville as Elsa
- Glyn Houston as Marriott
- Sean Lynch as Rattu
- Walter Brown as Hitala
- Inigo Jackson as Captain Boyd
- Jeremy Burnham as Captain Connelly
- Joe Powell as Colour Sergeant
- Henry Davies as Crowe
- Caron Gardner as serving maid
- John Southworth as Barlow
- Basdeo Panday

== Critical reception ==
A Time Out reviewer wrote, "India in 1850 provides the backdrop (supposedly, at least, since papier mâché rocks and rural England are much in evidence) for a routine military adventure"; while TV Guide noted the "battle climax is fast, well staged, and entertaining."

== Bibliography ==
- Monk, Claire; Sargeant, Amy (2002). British historical cinema: the history, heritage and costume film. Routledge.
- Richards, Jeffrey (1973). Visions of Yesterday. Routledge & Kegan Paul.
