= Inigo Jackson =

English actor (1933–2001)

- in The Saint (1964)
- Born: 19 July 1933; Kidderminster, Worcestershire, England
- Died: 25 August 2001 (aged 68); Tipton, West Midlands, England
- Education: RADA
- Occupation: Actor

Anthony Michael Jackson (19 July 1933 – 25 August 2001), known professionally as Inigo Jackson, was an English actor who appeared in theatre, films and television.

After leaving RADA in 1961, he changed his first name to Inigo believing that his birth name of Anthony Michael Jackson was too mundane sounding for a show business career.

One of his earliest film roles was that of Robert de Beaumont in Becket (1964). He later made many television appearances most notably as Athelstane in Ivanhoe and Zentos in the Doctor Who serial The Ark.

== Filmography ==
=== Film ===
Year	Title	Role	Notes
1964	Becket	Robert de Beaumont	
1964	Saturday Night Out	Harry	
1965	The Brigand of Kandahar	Captain Boyd	
1965	He Who Rides a Tiger	Det. Sgt. Scott	
1965	Doctor Zhivago	Major	Uncredited
1966	The Fighting Prince of Donegal		
1966	Who Killed the Cat?	Dr. Brentwood	
1966	The Trygon Factor	Ballistics Expert	
1969	Man on Horseback	Wenzel von Tronka	
1970	Hell Boats	C.P.O. Stanhope	
1971	Twins of Evil	Woodman	
1973	Wolfshead: The Legend of Robin Hood	Legros	(final film role)

=== Television ===
Year	Title	Role	Notes
1965	The Human Jungle	Robson	Episode: "The 24-Hour Man"
1970	Department S	Bray	Episode: "The Last Train to Redbridge"
