= Damien Thomas =

British actor (1942–2025)

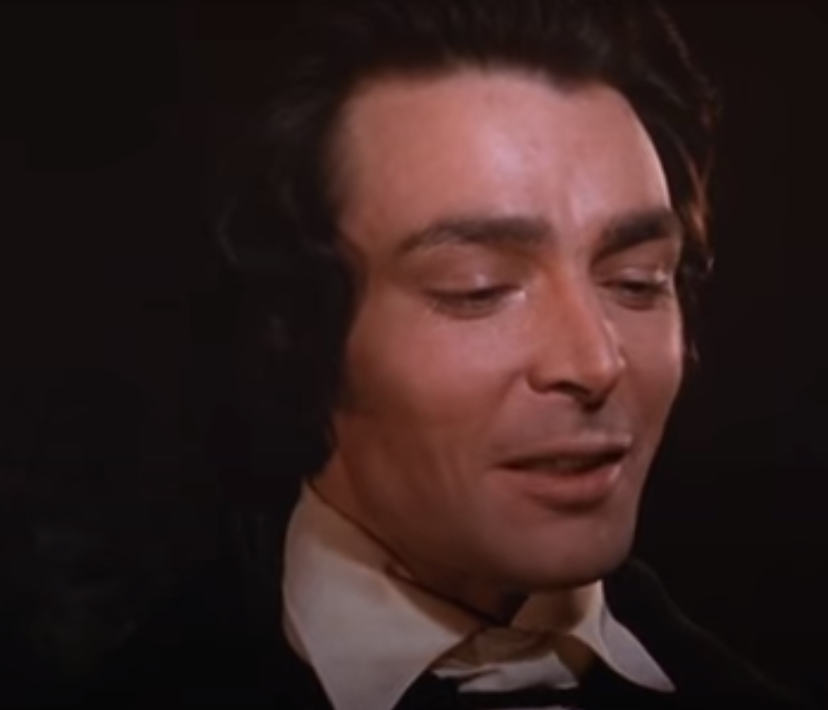
- Born: 11 April 1942; Ismailia, Egypt
- Died: 18 April 2025 (aged 83); Wiltshire, England
- Occupation: Actor
- Years active: 1968–2016
- Known for: Shōgun; Jane Eyre

Damien Roy Charles Noel Court-Thomas (11 April 1942 – 18 April 2025), known by his stage name Damien Thomas, was a British actor noted for his roles in British films and television, such as his role as Father Martin Alvito in the 1980 miniseries Shōgun and as Richard Mason in the 1983 BBC production of Jane Eyre.

== Early life and education ==
Thomas was born in 1942 in Ismailia, Egypt, the son of Squadron Leader Peter Court-Thomas and his wife Huguette (nee Bertrand) who had also been born in Egypt, but of French parents. His father was killed in action seven months after his birth and was awarded the DFC.

Thomas was educated at Wellington School and studied art at Dartington College of Arts, before training at the Royal Academy of Dramatic Art (RADA).

== Career ==
His film credits include Journey into Darkness (1968), Julius Caesar (1970), Twins of Evil (1971), Henry VIII and His Six Wives (1972), Tiffany Jones (1973), The Message (1976), Sinbad and the Eye of the Tiger (1977), Pirates (1986), Never Let Me Go (2010) and Grave Tales (2011).

His television credits include: Jason King,Van der Valk, Special Branch, Warship, Wilde Alliance, The Professionals, A.D., Noble House, Shōgun, Blake's 7, Beau Geste, Tenko, Widows, Dempsey and Makepeace, Wish Me Luck, House of Cards, Doctors, The Brittas Empire, Sherlock Holmes, and Agatha Christie's Poirot ("Murder on the Links").

== Personal life and death ==
Thomas was married three times, the first two marriages ending in divorce. He was married firstly to Jocelyne Sbath in 1968 and secondly to Françoise Alaoui-Drai in 1980 with whom he had a son, Dominic.

In 2012 he married his third wife, Julia Sargent. They had two daughters, Maud and Phoebe.

Thomas died after suffering from progressive supranuclear palsy on 18 April 2025, at the age of 83. He was survived by his third wife and by his three children.
