= Tudor Gates =

British writer and trade unionist (1930–2007)

- Born: 2 January 1930; United Kingdom
- Died: 11 January 2007 (aged 77); United Kingdom
- Occupations: Screenwriter, playwright, trade unionist

Tudor Gates (2 January 1930 – 11 January 2007) was a British screenwriter, playwright and trade unionist.

== Biography ==
Gates was involved in stage management by the early 1950s, and began scriptwriting in his spare time. After The Guv'nor was broadcast on television in 1956, he took to writing full-time. He wrote, co-wrote or worked on the screenplays for Barbarella, Danger: Diabolik (both 1968), The Vampire Lovers (1970), Fright, Lust for a Vampire, Twins of Evil (all 1971), The Love Box (1972), The Optimists of Nine Elms, The Sex Thief (both 1973) and Intimate Games (1976). He also wrote for several TV series, including The Sweeney and Strange Report.

In the 1966 general election, Gates stood as the Liberal Party candidate in Bethnal Green, and in 1970 he stood in the same interest in the Isle of Thanet, placing a distant third on both occasions. In February 1974, he came second in Bethnal Green and Bow, losing votes but again coming second in October.

Turning to the stage again in the mid-1970s, Gates wrote Who Saw Him Die?, Aurelia and Who Killed Agatha Christie?

A lifelong trade unionist, Gates became the President of the Association of Cinematograph Television and Allied Technicians and supported its merger with the Broadcasting and Entertainment Trades Alliance which formed the Broadcasting, Entertainment, Cinematograph and Theatre Union (BECTU), of which he served as vice president until 2004. A controversial figure, he twice took his union to court, using legislation passed by the Conservative Party in the 1980s. He stood unsuccessfully for the Presidency of BECTU in 2002, 2004 and 2006.

== Selected credits ==
- Danger: Diabolik (1968)
- The Young, the Evil and the Savage (1968; uncredited)
- Barbarella (1968)
- The Vampire Lovers (1970)
- Lust for a Vampire (1971)
- Twins of Evil (1971)
- Fright (1971)
- The Love Box (1972)
- The Optimists of Nine Elms (1973)
- The Sex Thief (1973)
- The Sweeney (TV series, 1975)
- Three for All (1975)
- Intimate Games (1976)
- Sex with the Stars (a.k.a. Confessions of the Naughty Nymphos) (1980)
