= Vampire film =

Film genre

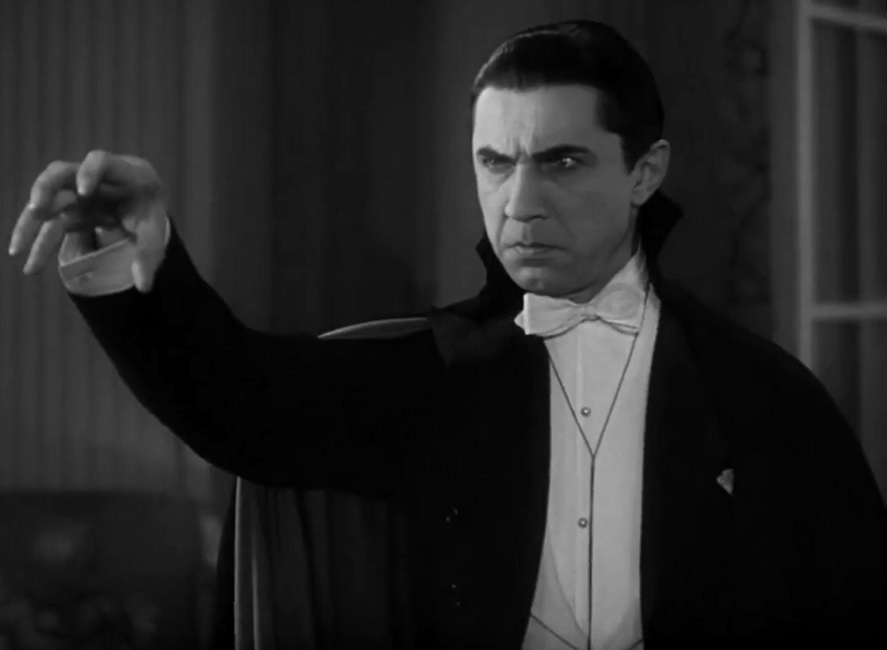
Bela Lugosi in Dracula (1931)

Vampire films have been a staple in world cinema since the era of silent films, so much so that the depiction of vampires in popular culture is strongly based upon their depiction in films throughout the years. The most popular cinematic adaptation of vampire fiction has been from Bram Stoker's 1897 novel Dracula, with over 170 versions to date. Running a distant second are adaptations of the 1872 novel Carmilla by Sheridan Le Fanu.

As folklore, vampires are defined by their need to feed on blood and on their manipulative nature; this theme has been held in common throughout the many adaptations. Although vampires are usually associated with the horror (and sometimes the zombie genre), vampire films may also fall into the drama, action, science fiction, romance, comedy or fantasy genres, amongst others.

== History ==
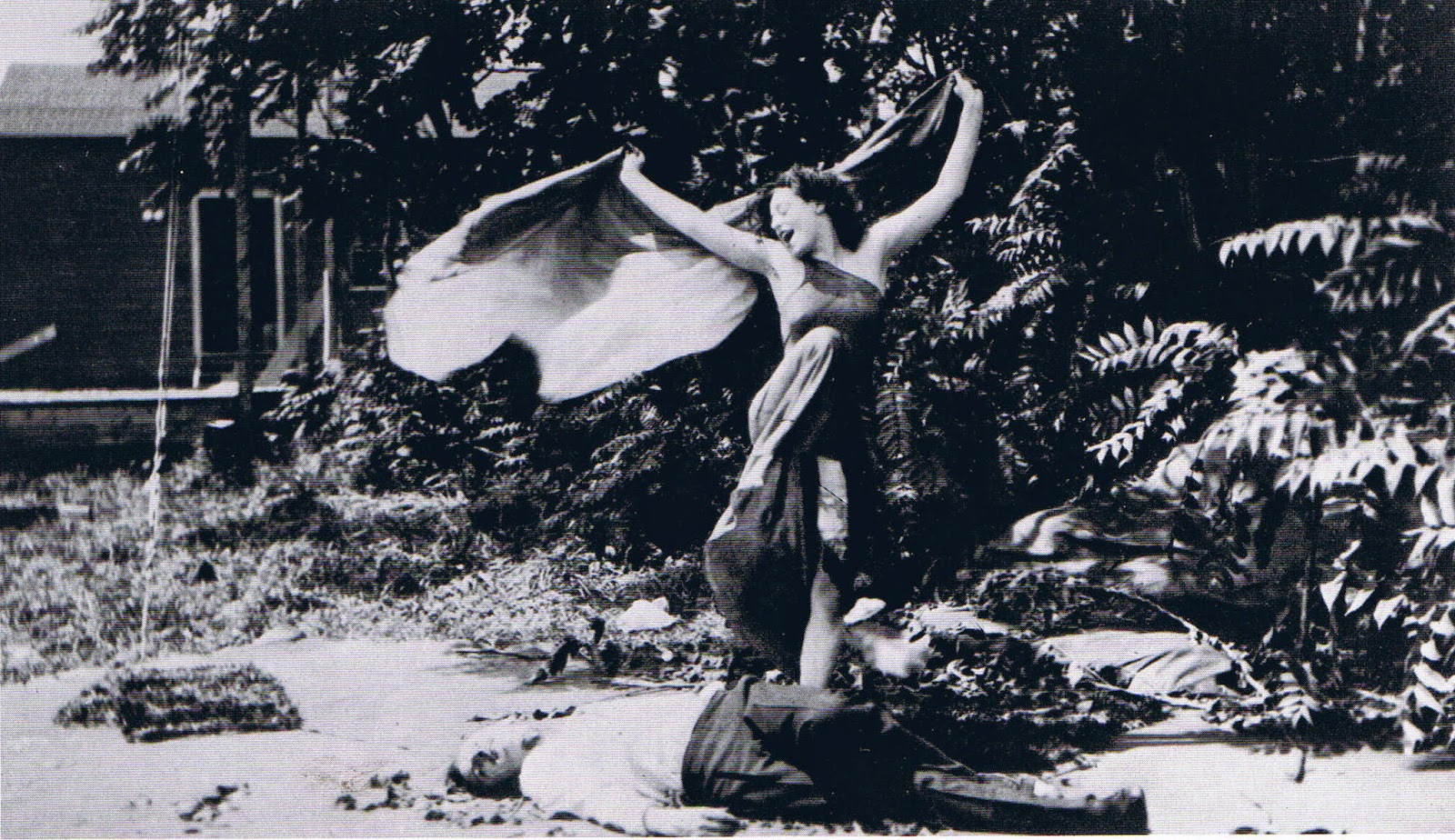
A scene from The Vampire, 1913

As The House of the Devil depicts a human transforming into a bat, it has been labelled by some as the first vampire film. However, early cinematic vampires in other such films as The Vampire (1913), directed by Robert G. Vignola, were not undead bloodsucking fiends, but femme fatale "vamps". Such characters were inspired by a poem by Rudyard Kipling called "The Vampire", composed in 1897. This poem was written as kind of commentary on a painting of a female vampire by Philip Burne-Jones exhibited in the same year. A phrase from Kipling's poem was used as the title of the film A Fool There Was (1915), starring Theda Bara, and the poem was used in the publicity for the film.

An early adaptation of the immortal aristocrat may have been the Hungarian feature film Drakula halála (Károly Lajthay, 1921), which is now thought to be a lost film.

An authentic supernatural vampire features in the landmark Nosferatu (1922 Germany, directed by F. W. Murnau) starring Max Schreck as the hideous Count Orlok. This was an unlicensed version of Bram Stoker's Dracula, based so closely on the novel that the estate sued and won, with all copies ordered to be destroyed. It would be painstakingly restored in 1994 by a team of European scholars from the five surviving prints that had escaped destruction. The destruction of the vampire, in the closing sequence of the film, by sunlight rather than the traditional stake through the heart proved very influential on later films and became an accepted part of vampire lore.

The next classic treatment of the vampire legend was an adaptation of the stage play based on Bram Stoker's novel Dracula, Universal's Dracula (1931) starring Bela Lugosi as Count Dracula. Lugosi's performance was so popular that his Hungarian accent and sweeping gestures became characteristics now commonly associated with Dracula. Five years after the release of the film, Universal released Dracula's Daughter (1936), a direct sequel that starts immediately after the end of the first film. A second sequel, Son of Dracula starring Lon Chaney Jr., followed in 1943. Despite his apparent death in the 1931 film, the Count returned to life in three more Universal films of the mid-1940s: House of Frankenstein (1944) and House of Dracula (1945)—both starring John Carradine—and Abbott and Costello Meet Frankenstein (1948). While Lugosi had played a vampire in two other films during the 1930s and 1940s, it was only in this final film that he played Count Dracula on-screen for the second (and last) time.

Dracula was reincarnated for a new generation in the Hammer Films series starring Christopher Lee as the Count. In the first of these films Dracula (1958) the spectacular death of the title character through being exposed to the sun reinforced this part of vampire lore, first established in Nosferatu, and made it virtually axiomatic in succeeding films. Lee returned as Dracula in all but two of the seven sequels. Another adaptation of Stoker's novel appeared as Bram Stoker's Dracula (1992), directed by Francis Ford Coppola, though also identifying Count Dracula with the notorious medieval Balkan ruler Vlad III the Impaler.

A distinct subgenre of vampire films, ultimately inspired by Le Fanu's "Carmilla", explored the topic of the lesbian vampire. Although implied in Dracula's Daughter, the first openly lesbian vampire was in Blood and Roses (1960) by Roger Vadim. More explicit lesbian content was provided in Hammer's Karnstein Trilogy. The first of these, The Vampire Lovers (1970), starring Ingrid Pitt and Madeline Smith, was a relatively straightforward re-telling of LeFanu's novella, but with more overt violence and sexuality. Later films in this subgenre such as Vampyres (1974) became even more explicit in their depiction of sex, nudity and violence.

Beginning with Abbott and Costello Meet Frankenstein (1948) the vampire has often been the subject of comedy. The Fearless Vampire Killers (1967) by Roman Polanski was a notable parody of the genre. Other comedic treatments, of variable quality, include Vampira (1974) featuring David Niven as a lovelorn Dracula, Love at First Bite (1979) featuring George Hamilton, My Best Friend Is a Vampire (1988), Innocent Blood (1992), Buffy the Vampire Slayer (1992), Dracula: Dead and Loving It (1995), directed by Mel Brooks with Leslie Nielsen, and, more recently, Taika Waititi and Jemaine Clement's mockumentary take on the subject, What We Do in the Shadows (2014).

Another development in some vampire films has been a change from supernatural horror to science fictional explanations of vampirism. The Last Man on Earth (1964, directed by Sidney Salkow), The Omega Man (1971 US, directed by Boris Sagal) and two other films were all based on Richard Matheson's novel I Am Legend. They explain the condition as having a natural cause. Vampirism is explained as a kind of virus in David Cronenberg's Rabid (1976), The Hunger with an international cast directed by Tony Scott and Red-Blooded American Girl (1990) directed by David Blyth, as well as in the Blade trilogy to a limited extent.

Race has been another theme, as exemplified by the blaxploitation picture Blacula (1972) and its sequel Scream Blacula Scream.

Though always a representation of passion and desire, since the time of Béla Lugosi's Dracula (1931) the vampire, male or female, has usually been portrayed as an alluring sex symbol. Christopher Lee, Delphine Seyrig, Frank Langella, Lauren Hutton, Catherine Deneuve and Aaliyah are just a few examples of actors who brought great sex appeal into their portrayal of the vampire. Latterly, the implicit sexual themes of vampire film have become much more overt, culminating in such films as Gayracula (1983) and The Vampire of Budapest (1995), two pornographic all-male vampire films, and Lust for Dracula (2005), a softcore pornography all-lesbian adaptation of Bram Stoker's novel.

There is, however, a very small subgenre, pioneered in Murnau's seminal Nosferatu (1922) in which the portrayal of the vampire is similar to the hideous creature of European folklore. Max Schreck's portrayal of this role in Murnau's film was copied by Klaus Kinski in Werner Herzog's remake Nosferatu the Vampyre (1979). In Shadow of the Vampire (2000) (directed by E. Elias Merhige) Willem Dafoe plays Max Schreck, himself, though portrayed here as an actual vampire. Stephen King's Salem's Lot (1979) notably depicts vampires as terrifying, simple-minded creatures, without eroticism, and with the only desire to feed on the blood of others. The main vampire in the Subspecies films, Radu, also exhibits similar aesthetic influences, such as long fingers and nails and generally grotesque facial features. This type of vampire is also featured in the film 30 Days of Night. The 2011 remake of Fright Night is notable for such a hideous depiction of the vampire when manifesting.

A major character in most vampire films is the vampire hunter, of which Stoker's Abraham Van Helsing is a prototype. Peter Vincent (Roddy McDowell) in Fright Night (1985) and the Frog brothers in The Lost Boys (1987) were all vampire hunters. However, killing vampires has changed. Where Van Helsing relied on a stake through the heart, in Vampires (1998), directed by John Carpenter, Jack Crow (James Woods) has a heavily armed squad of vampire hunters and in Buffy the Vampire Slayer (1992, directed by Fran Rubel Kuzui), writer Joss Whedon (who created TV's Buffy the Vampire Slayer and spin-off Angel) attached the Slayer, Buffy Summers (Kristy Swanson in the film, Sarah Michelle Gellar in the TV series), to a network of Watchers and mystically endowed her with superhuman powers.

=== Dracula in films and his legacy ===
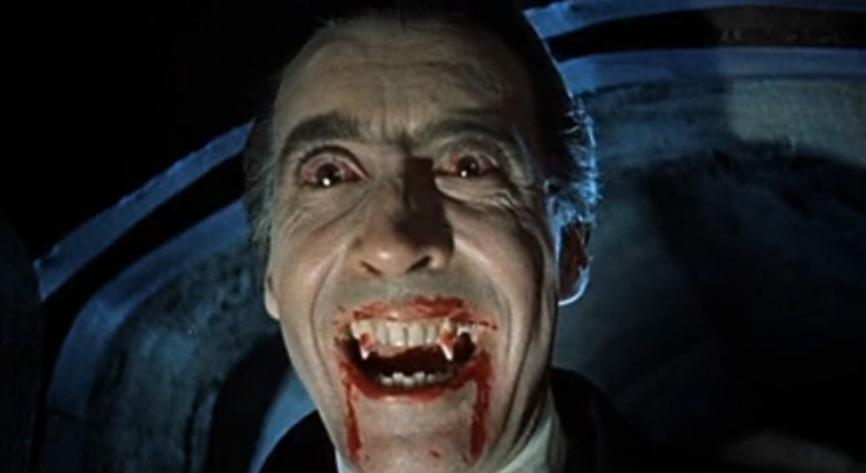
Christopher Lee portrayed Dracula in ten films

By far, the most well-known and popular vampire in the films is Count Dracula. A large number of films have been filmed over the years depicting the evil Count, some of which are ranked among the greatest depictions of vampires on film. Dracula has over 170 film representations to date, making him the most frequently portrayed character in horror films; also he has the highest number of film appearances overall, surpassed only by Sherlock Holmes.

In his documentary "Vampire Princess" (2007) the investigative Austrian author and director Klaus T. Steindl discovered in 2007 the historical inspiration for Bram Stoker's legendary Dracula character (see also Literature - Bram Stoker: Dracula's Guest): "Many experts believe, the deleted opening was actually based on a woman. Archaeologists, historians, and forensic scientists revisit the days of vampire hysteria in the eighteenth-century Czech Republic and re-open the unholy grave of dark princess Eleonore von Schwarzenberg. They uncover her story, once buried and long forgotten, now raised from the dead."

=== Vampire television series ===
==== Live action ====
One of the first television series with a vampire as a main character was the 1964 comedy series The Munsters. Lily Munster and Grandpa (also known as Vladimir Dracula, Count of Transylvania) are vampires. The Munsters was followed in 1966 by the Gothic soap opera Dark Shadows, in which the reluctant vampire Barnabas Collins became a main character.

In 1985, The Little Vampire was a television series made for children. It tells the adventures of the vampire child Rüdiger and his human friend Anton. Forever Knight (1992–1996) was the first vampire detective story, later followed by similar series like Angel, Moonlight, Blood Ties and Vampire Prosecutor. In 1997, the teenage vampire hunter series Buffy the Vampire Slayer became popular around the world. Buffy Summers is a teenage girl who finds out that she is a vampire slayer. She also finds herself drawn to a vampire.

True Blood (2008) centers on the adventures of the telepathic waitress Sookie Stackhouse, who falls in love with a vampire. In the same year BBC Three series Being Human became popular in Britain. It features an unconventional trio of a vampire, a werewolf, and a ghost who are sharing a flat in Bristol.

In 2009 The Vampire Diaries told the story of the school girl Elena Gilbert, who falls in love with vampire Stefan Salvatore, but finds herself also drawn to Stefan's brother Damon. The Strain (2014) is based on the novel of the same name by Guillermo del Toro.

What We Do In The Shadows (2019-2024) is a continuation of the film of the same name in a mockumentary style and follows a new group of vampires, played by comedians. Interview With The Vampire (2022-present) is an adaption of the book series by Anne Rice, inserting homosexual themes, whereas the 1994 film adaptation of the same represents the longing and tension in the novels felt by creatures who do not have sex.

==== Animation ====
One of the first animated vampire series was the 1988 series Count Duckula, a parody of Dracula. In 1985, the anime film adaptation of the inaugural Vampire Hunter D novel was released direct-to-video and became popular in both Japan and the United States, prompting an adaptation of the third novel into the also direct to video film Vampire Hunter D: Bloodlust in 2000. The two films and the novels they are based on revolve around the eponymous D, a vampire hunter who is the apparent half-vampire/half-human son of Dracula who battles vampires in the year AD 12,090. In 1997, the anime series Vampire Princess Miyu became popular in Japan, and many other anime followed. Vampire Knight is an anime from 2008 based on the manga published from 2004-2013, it is about a girl who is the daughter of the chairman at an elite vampire academy where she is their guardian. JoJo's Bizarre Adventure was released in 2012, featuring several vampiric villains. Also in 2012, Hotel Transylvania was released, followed by a sequel in 2015, Hotel Transylvania 2 and in 2018 by Hotel Transylvania 3: Summer Vacation.

Streaming provider Netflix released four seasons of Castlevania 2017-2021, loosely based on the video game franchise of the same name (Castlevania), where Dracula is a vengeful warlord who summons supernatural armies of demons to avenge the death of his wife in a supernatural setting. Netflix released a sequel series (Castlevania: Nocturne) in 2023.

Another Japanese anime series, Rosario + Vampire, portrays one of the leading female characters, Moka Akashiya, as a vampire, whose demonic powers are sealed inside her with a rosary seal around her neck. The series portrays other kinds of fictional monsters as well, including a witch and a snowwoman.

=== Vampire web series ===
From 2001 onward vampire web series became popular around the world. One of the first web series was the 2001 series The Hunted. It is about a group of vampire slayers who have been bitten by vampires (but not yet turned into vampires) and try to fight the bloodsucking vampires. The Hunted was followed by 30 Days of Night: Blood Trails (2007) and 30 Days of Night: Dust to Dust (2008) who were based on the films 30 Days of Night and 30 Days of Night: Dark Days. In 2009 the MTV online series Valemont follows Maggie Gracen, who decides to infiltrate Valemont University, because her brother Eric has vanished. She soon finds out that the University is full of vampires. The 2009 web series I Heart Vampires focuses on two teenage vampire fans, who find out that vampires are more than real. In 2011 the Being Human spin-off Becoming Human was released online. It is about a vampire, a werewolf and a ghost who go to a school together and try to solve a murder. The 2014 vampire series Carmilla features a retelling of the story of the vampire Carmilla Karnstein, who attends a university in the modern day and falls in love with a human girl.

== See also ==
- Vampire literature
- List of fictional vampires
- Elizabeth Báthory in popular culture
- List of vampire television series
- List of vampire films
- Bloodsucking Cinema, a documentary about vampire films
