= Mary Collinson =

Maltese model and actress (1952–2021)

- Collinson in Twins of Evil (1971)

Playboy centerfold appearance
- October 1970
- Preceded by: Debbie Ellison
- Succeeded by: Avis Miller

Personal details
- Born: 22 July 1952; Sliema, Malta
- Died: 23 November 2021 (aged 69); Milan, Italy
- Height: 5 ft 6.5 in (169 cm)
- Official website

Mary Collinson (22 July 1952 – 23 November 2021) was a Maltese-British model and actress. She was chosen as Playboy magazine's Playmate of the Month in October 1970, together with her twin sister Madeleine Collinson. They were the first identical twin Playmate sisters.

The Collinson twins first arrived in Britain in April 1969, and prior to their appearance in Playboy one of the first people to use them was the glamour photographer/film maker Harrison Marks who cast them as saucy maids in his short film Halfway Inn. The film, made for the 8mm market, was shot sometime between their British arrival, and July 1970, when a still from the film was used in a Marks advertisement that ran in that month's issue of Continental Film Review magazine.

Her sister was quoted in The Playmate Book saying that Mary had two daughters and lived in Milan with an "Italian gentleman", whom she had been with for more than 20 years.

Collinson died from bronchopneumonia in Milan, on 23 November 2021, at the age of 69.

== Filmography ==
- Come Back Peter (1969)
- Permissive (1970)
- Groupie Girl (1970)
- She'll Follow You Anywhere (1971)
- The Love Machine (1971)
- Twins of Evil (a.k.a. Twins of Dracula) (1971)

== Notable TV guest appearances ==
- The Tonight Show Starring Johnny Carson, 16 September 1970

== Magazine appearances ==
- Impact '70 magazine 1970 Vol. 1. No 1 "Double Exposure" photo story made up of stills from 'Halfway Inn'.
- Mascotte magazine August 1970 "Mary Collins" nude photos and Miss Mascotte centerfold
- Cinema X magazine 1972 Vol.4 No.3 "Those Curvy Collinsons meet The Love Machine"
- Titbits magazine 11 July 1973 "Which Twin has the Twinge"

== See also ==
- List of people in Playboy 1970–1979

Jill Taylor	Linda Forsythe	Chris Koren	Barbara Hillary	Jennifer Liano	Elaine Morton
Carol Willis	Sharon Clark	Debbie Ellison	Mary and Madeleine Collinson	Avis Miller	Carol Imhof
