= Madeleine Collinson =

Maltese-British model and actress

- Collinson in Twins of Evil (1971)

Playboy centerfold appearance
- October 1970
- Preceded by: Debbie Ellison
- Succeeded by: Avis Miller

Personal details
- Born: 22 July 1952 Sliema, Malta
- Died: 14 August 2014 (aged 62) Msida, Malta
- Height: 5 ft 6 in (168 cm)

Madeleine Collinson (22 July 1952 – 14 August 2014) was a Maltese-British model and actress. She was chosen as Playboy magazine's Playmate of the Month in October 1970, together with her twin sister Mary Collinson. They were the first identical twin Playmates.

== Career ==
The Collinson twins first arrived in Britain in April 1969, and prior to their appearance in Playboy one of the first people to use them was the glamour photographer/film maker Harrison Marks who cast them as saucy maids in his short film Halfway Inn. The film, made for the 8mm market, was shot sometime between their British arrival, and July 1970, when a still from the film was used in a Marks advertisement that ran in that month's issue of Continental Film Review magazine.

Both sisters went on to acting careers, mostly in B-movies. Madeleine married a British Royal Air Force officer and raised three children. She later moved back to Malta and was involved in cultural and educational activities there. In her final years, Madeleine Collinson lived in San Gwann, Malta.

== Death ==
After several months of illness from advanced emphysema, she died at Mater Dei Hospital in Msida on 14 August 2014, following an electrical blackout which had stopped her ventilator two days earlier. Her twin sister Mary was present for her death.

== Filmography ==
- Come Back Peter (1969)
- Permissive (1970)
- Groupie Girl (1970)
- She'll Follow You Anywhere (1971)
- The Love Machine (1971)
- Twins of Evil (a.k.a. Twins of Dracula) 1971)

== Notable TV guest appearances ==
- The Tonight Show Starring Johnny Carson 16 September 1970

== Magazine appearances ==
- Impact '70 magazine 1970 Vol. 1. No 1 "Double Exposure" photo story made up of stills from 'Halfway Inn'.
- Cinema X magazine 1972 Vol.4 No.3 "Those Curvy Collinsons meet The Love Machine"
- Titbits magazine 11 July 1973 "Which Twin has the Twinge"

== See also ==
- List of people in Playboy 1970–79

Jill Taylor	Linda Forsythe	Chris Koren	Barbara Hillary	Jennifer Liano	Elaine Morton
Carol Willis	Sharon Clark	Debbie Ellison	Mary and Madeleine Collinson	Avis Miller	Carol Imhof
