= Hammer Film Productions =

British horror film studio

Hammer Films
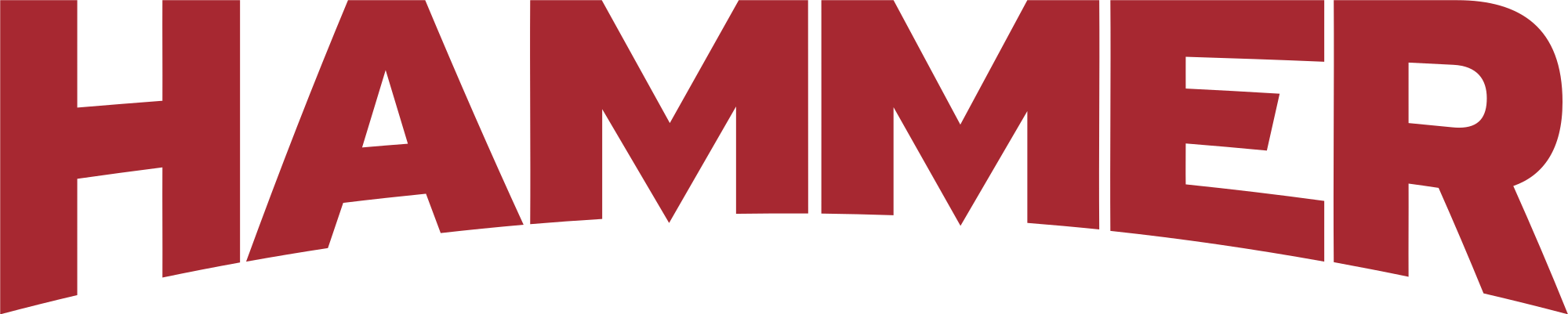
- Type: Production company
- Industry: Film production; Television production; Theatrical production; Publishing
- Founded: 5 November 1934; 92 years ago
- Founder: William Hinds; Enrique Carreras
- Headquarters: London, England
- Key people: John Gore (CEO and Chairman)
- Parent: John Gore Organization (2023–present)
- Divisions: Exclusive Film Distribution
- Website: Official website

Hammer Film Productions Ltd. is a British film production company based in London. Founded in 1934, the company is best known for a series of Gothic horror and fantasy films made from the mid-1950s until the 1970s. Many of these involve classic horror characters such as Victor Frankenstein, Count Dracula, and the Mummy, which Hammer reintroduced to audiences by filming them in vivid colour for the first time. Hammer also produced science fiction, thrillers, film noir and comedies, as well as, in later years, television series.

During its most successful years, Hammer dominated the horror film market, enjoying worldwide distribution and considerable financial success. This success was, in part, due to its distribution partnerships with American companies such as United Artists, Warner Bros., Universal Pictures, Columbia Pictures, Paramount Pictures, 20th Century Fox, Metro-Goldwyn-Mayer, American International Pictures and Seven Arts Productions.

During the late 1960s and 1970s, the saturation of the horror film market by competitors and the loss of American funding forced changes to the previously lucrative Hammer formula with varying degrees of success. The company eventually ceased production in the mid-1980s. In 2000, the studio was bought by a consortium including advertising executive and art collector Charles Saatchi and publishing millionaires Neil Mendoza and William Sieghart.

In May 2007, the company name was sold to a consortium headed by Dutch media tycoon John de Mol, who announced plans to spend some $50 million (£25m) on new horror films. The new organization acquired the Hammer group's film library of 295 pictures. Simon Oakes, who took over as CEO of the new Hammer, said, "Hammer is a great British brand—we intend to take it back into production and develop its global potential. The brand is still alive but no one has invested in it for a long time."

Since then, Hammer has produced several films, including Beyond the Rave (2008), Let Me In (2010), The Resident (2011), The Woman in Black (2012), The Quiet Ones (2014), and The Lodge (2019).

== Hammer before horror ==
=== Early history (1935–1937) ===
In November 1934, William Hinds, a comedian and businessman, registered his film company, Hammer Productions Ltd. It was housed in a three-room office suite at Imperial House, Regent Street, London. The company name came from Hinds' stage name, Will Hammer, which he had taken from the area of London in which he lived, Hammersmith.

Work began almost immediately on the first film, a now lost comedy, The Public Life of Henry the Ninth at the MGM/ATP studios. Filming concluded on 2 January 1935. The film tells the story of Henry Henry, an unemployed London street musician, and the title was a "playful tribute" to Alexander Korda's The Private Life of Henry VIII which was Britain's first Academy Award for Best Picture nominee in 1934. During this time Hinds met Spanish émigré Enrique Carreras, a former cinema owner, and on 10 May 1935 they formed the film distribution company Exclusive Films, operating from an office at 60-66 National House, Wardour Street. Hammer produced four films distributed by Exclusive:

- The Mystery of the Mary Celeste (1935; Phantom Ship in the U.S.), featuring Bela Lugosi
- Sporting Love (1936)
- Song of Freedom (1936), featuring Paul Robeson
- The Bank Messenger Mystery (1936)

A downturn in the British film industry forced Hammer into bankruptcy, and the company went into liquidation in 1937. Exclusive survived and on 20 July 1937 purchased the leasehold on 113-117 Wardour Street and continued to distribute films made by other companies.

=== Revival (1938–1955) ===
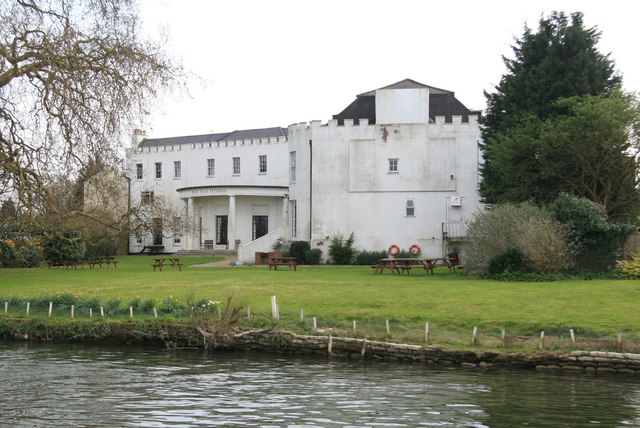
Bray Studios, Berkshire. Bray Studios, close to the frequently-used filming location Oakley Court, was Hammer's principal base from 1951 to 1966.

James Carreras, Enrique's son, joined Exclusive in 1938, closely followed by William Hinds' son, Anthony. At the outbreak of World War II, James Carreras and Anthony Hinds left to join the armed forces and Exclusive continued to operate in a limited capacity. In 1946, James Carreras rejoined the company after demobilisation. He resurrected Hammer as the film production arm of Exclusive with a view to supplying 'quota-quickies', cheaply made domestic films designed to fill gaps in cinema schedules and support more expensive features. He convinced Anthony Hinds to rejoin the company, and a revived Hammer Film Productions set to work on Death in High Heels, The Dark Road, and Crime Reporter. Not able to afford top stars, Hammer acquired the film rights to BBC radio series such as The Adventures of PC 49 and Dick Barton: Special Agent (an adaptation of the successful Dick Barton radio show). All were filmed at Marylebone Studios during 1947. During the production of Dick Barton Strikes Back (1948), it became apparent that the company could save money by shooting in country houses instead of studios. For the next production, Dr Morelle – The Case of the Missing Heiress (another radio adaptation), Hammer rented Dial Close, a 23 bedroom mansion on Winter Hill, beside the River Thames, at Cookham Dean, Maidenhead.

On 12 February 1949, Exclusive registered "Hammer Film Productions" as a company with Enrique and James Carreras, and William and Tony Hinds as directors. Hammer moved into the Exclusive offices in 113-117 Wardour Street, and the building was rechristened "Hammer House".

In August 1949, complaints from locals about noise during night filming forced Hammer to leave Dial Close and move into another mansion, Oakley Court, also on the banks of the Thames between Windsor and Maidenhead. Five films were produced there: Man in Black (1949), Room to Let (1949), Someone at the Door (1949), What the Butler Saw (1950), The Lady Craved Excitement (1950).

In 1950, Hammer moved again to Gilston Park, a country club in Harlow, Essex, which hosted The Black Widow, The Rossiter Case, To Have and to Hold and The Dark Light (all 1950).

In 1951, Hammer began shooting at their most fondly-remembered base, Down Place, on the banks of the Thames. The company signed a one-year lease and began its 1951 production schedule with Cloudburst. The house, virtually derelict, required substantial work, but it did not have the construction restrictions that had prevented Hammer from customising previous homes. A decision was made to remodel Down Place into a substantial, custom-fitted studio complex that became known as Bray Studios. The expansive grounds were used for much of the later location shooting in Hammer's films and are a key to the 'Hammer look'.

Also in 1951, Hammer and Exclusive signed a four-year production and distribution contract with Robert Lippert, an American film producer. The contract meant that Lippert Pictures and Exclusive effectively exchanged products for distribution on their respective sides of the Atlantic – beginning in 1951 with The Last Page and ending with 1955's Women Without Men (a.k.a. Prison Story). It was Lippert's insistence on an American star in the Hammer films he was to distribute that led to the prevalence of American leads in many of the company's productions during the 1950s. It was for The Last Page that Hammer made a significant appointment when they hired film director Terence Fisher, who played a critical role in the forthcoming horror cycle.

Towards the end of 1951, the one-year lease on Down Place expired, and with its growing success Hammer looked towards more conventional studio-based productions. A dispute with the Association of Cinematograph Technicians blocked this proposal, and the company purchased the freehold of Down Place instead. The house was renamed Bray Studios after the nearby village of Bray, and it remained Hammer's principal base until 1966. In 1953, the first of Hammer's science fiction films, Four Sided Triangle and Spaceways, were released.

=== Hammer Horror (1955–1959) ===
Hammer's first significant experiment with horror came in a 1955 adaptation of Nigel Kneale's BBC Television science fiction serial The Quatermass Experiment, directed by Val Guest. As a consequence of the contract with Robert Lippert, American actor Brian Donlevy was imported for the lead role and the title was changed to The Quatermass Xperiment to cash in on the new X certificate for horror films. The film was unexpectedly popular, and led to the popular 1957 sequel Quatermass 2 – again adapted from one of Kneale's television scripts, this time by Kneale and with a budget double that of the original: £92,000. In the meantime, Hammer produced another Quatermass -style horror film, X the Unknown, originally intended as part of the series until Kneale denied them permission to use his characters (the writer is known to have disliked Donlevy's performance as Quatermass). At the time, Hammer voluntarily submitted scripts to the British Board of Film Censors (BBFC) for comment before production. Regarding the script of X the Unknown, one reader/examiner (Audrey Field) commented on 24 November:

Well, no one can say the customers won't have had their money's worth by now. In fact, someone will almost certainly have been sick. We must have a great deal more restraint, and much more done by onlookers' reactions instead of by shots of 'pulsating obscenity', hideous scars, hideous sightless faces, etc, etc. It is keeping on and on in the same vein that makes this script so outrageous. They must take it away and prune. Before they take it away, however, I think the President [of the BBFC] should read it. I have a stronger stomach than the average (for viewing purposes) and perhaps I ought to be reacting more strongly.

== Hammer Horror contributors ==
=== Directors and writers ===
- Michael Carreras, a.k.a. Henry Younger, writer/director of The Curse of the Mummy's Tomb, and director/producer of The Lost Continent
- Terence Fisher, directed 29 films for Hammer, including The Curse of Frankenstein, Dracula, and The Mummy
- Freddie Francis, director of The Evil of Frankenstein and Dracula Has Risen from the Grave
- Roy Ward Baker, director of Quatermass and the Pit, Dr. Jekyll and Sister Hyde, The Legend of the 7 Golden Vampires and others
- Tudor Gates, writer of The Vampire Lovers, Lust for a Vampire, and Twins of Evil
- John Gilling, writer and director of The Shadow of the Cat, The Plague of the Zombies, The Reptile, and The Mummy's Shroud
- Anthony Hinds, a.k.a. John Elder, writer of The Curse of the Werewolf, Frankenstein Created Woman and others
- Jimmy Sangster, writer of The Curse of Frankenstein, Dracula and others; director of The Horror of Frankenstein and Lust for a Vampire
- Peter Sasdy, director of Taste the Blood of Dracula and Hands of the Ripper
- Seth Holt, director of Taste of Fear, The Nanny and Blood from the Mummy's Tomb
- Don Sharp, director of Kiss of the Vampire and Rasputin the Mad Monk
- Alan Gibson, director of Crescendo, Dracula A.D. 1972 and The Satanic Rites of Dracula
- Don Houghton, writer of Dracula A.D. 1972, The Satanic Rites of Dracula, The Legend of the 7 Golden Vampires and Shatter
- Peter Sykes, director of Demons of the Mind and To the Devil a Daughter

=== Other personnel ===
The scores for many Hammer horror films, including The Curse of Frankenstein and Dracula, were composed by James Bernard. Other Hammer musical personnel included Malcolm Williamson, John Hollingsworth, and Harry Robertson.

Production designer Bernard Robinson and cinematographer Jack Asher were instrumental in creating the lavish look of the early Hammer films, usually on a very restricted budget.

=== Actors ===
Hammer's horror films featured many actors who appeared repeatedly in a number of movies, forming an informal "Hammer repertory company".

- Ralph Bates appeared in a number of Hammer films in the early 1970s when the company considered him as a possible replacement both for Peter Cushing in the role of Frankenstein and for Christopher Lee in the role of Dracula. Despite appearing in one film in each of these horror series, ultimately he permanently replaced neither actor.
- Shane Briant had leading roles in several well-regarded Hammer films of the early 1970s, such as Straight On till Morning and Frankenstein and the Monster from Hell.
- Veronica Carlson was a leading lady in Hammer films of the late 1960s.
- Peter Cushing was Hammer's pre-eminent star from the late 1950s to the mid-1970s and remains, along with Christopher Lee, the actor most commonly associated with the company; in Hammer films he played Baron Victor Frankenstein six times and Doctor Van Helsing five times, along with many other characters, both heroic and villainous.
- Michael Gough had supporting roles in Hammer's Dracula and The Phantom of the Opera. Like Peter Cushing and Christopher Lee, Gough also appeared in horror films made by Hammer's main U.K. rival, Amicus Productions, amongst others.
- Andrew Keir was a Scottish actor who appeared in leading roles for Hammer in films such as Quatermass and the Pit and Blood from the Mummy's Tomb.
- Christopher Lee was propelled to international stardom when he played Count Dracula in Hammer's 1958 version of the classic horror tale, a role he would play a further six times for Hammer in various sequels. He is today regarded as one of the biggest horror stars in film history.
- Miles Malleson was employed by Hammer to provide comic relief in their earlier Gothic horror films, such as The Brides of Dracula.
- Francis Matthews played second leads in several Hammer films, such as The Revenge of Frankenstein and Dracula: Prince of Darkness.
- André Morell was employed mainly in supporting parts in British films of the 1950s and 1960s, but took lead roles for Hammer in films like The Shadow of the Cat and The Plague of the Zombies.
- Ingrid Pitt had the lead roles in the Hammer vampire films The Vampire Lovers and Countess Dracula.
- David Prowse, best known for physically portraying Darth Vader in the original Star Wars trilogy, appeared in the Hammer films The Horror of Frankenstein, Vampire Circus, and Frankenstein and the Monster from Hell. In both Frankenstein films, Prowse played the Monster.
- Oliver Reed had his international film career launched by Hammer, for whom he gave powerful performances in films like The Curse of the Werewolf, Paranoiac and The Damned.
- Michael Ripper was Hammer's most prolific actor, appearing in dozens of supporting roles for the company, usually as publicans, coach drivers, and minor officials, throughout the company's most successful years. His final Hammer horror film appearance was in Scars of Dracula in 1970.
- Barbara Shelley was a prolific actress who performed in Hammer films, such as The Gorgon and Quatermass and the Pit.
- Madeline Smith transitioned from a modelling career to acting and appeared in Hammer's Taste the Blood of Dracula before gaining more prominent roles in The Vampire Lovers and Frankenstein and the Monster from Hell.
- Thorley Walters was a well known comedy actor in British films who played semi-comic supporting roles in Hammer films, such as The Phantom of the Opera, Frankenstein Created Woman and Vampire Circus.
- George Woodbridge played many supporting roles and minor characters in films such as Dracula, The Revenge of Frankenstein, and The Mummy .

== Key horror films ==
=== The Curse of Frankenstein ===
As production began on Quatermass 2, Hammer started to look for another U.S. partner willing to invest in and handle the American promotion of new product. They eventually entered talks with Associated Artists Productions (a.a.p.) and head, Eliot Hyman. During this period, two young American filmmakers, Max J. Rosenberg and Milton Subotsky, who later established Hammer's rival Amicus, submitted to a.a.p. a script for an adaptation of the novel Frankenstein. Although interested in the script, a.a.p. were not prepared to back a film made by Rosenberg and Subotsky, who had just one film to their credit. Eliot Hyman however, sent the script to his contact at Hammer. Rosenberg would often claim he 'produced' The Curse of Frankenstein, an exaggeration repeated in his obituary.

Although the novel by Mary Shelley was long since in the public domain, Anthony Hinds was unsure about the story, as Subotsky's script adhered closely to the plot of the 1939 Universal film Son of Frankenstein, featuring a second-generation Baron Frankenstein emulating his father, the original monster-maker. This put the project at risk of a copyright infringement lawsuit by Universal. In addition a great deal of polishing and additional material was needed, as the short script had an estimated running time of just 55 minutes, far less than the minimum of 90 minutes needed for distribution in the U.K. Accordingly, comments on the script from Hammer's Michael Carreras (who had joined his father James as producer in the early 1950s) were less than complimentary:

The script is badly presented. The sets are not marked clearly on the shot headings, neither is DAY or NIGHT specified in a number of cases. The number of set-ups scripted is quite out of proportion to the length of the screenplay, and we suggest that your rewrites are done in master scene form.

Further revisions were made to the script, and a working title of Frankenstein and the Monster was chosen. Plans were made to shoot the film in Eastmancolor – a decision which caused worry at the BBFC. Not only did the script contain horror and graphic violence, but it would be portrayed in vivid colour.

The project was handed to Tony Hinds, who was less impressed with the script than Michael Carreras, and whose vision for the film was a simple black-and-white 'quickie' made in three weeks. Concerned that Subotsky and Rosenberg's script had too many similarities to the Universal films, Hinds commissioned Jimmy Sangster to rewrite it as The Curse of Frankenstein. Sangster's treatment impressed Hammer enough to rescue the film from the 'quickie' treadmill and to produce it as a colour film.

Sangster submitted his script to the BBFC for examination. Audrey Field reported on 10 October 1956:

We are concerned about the flavour of this script, which, in its preoccupation with horror and gruesome detail, goes far beyond what we are accustomed to allow even for the 'X' category. I am afraid we can give no assurance that we should be able to pass a film based on the present script and a revised script should be sent us for our comments, in which the overall unpleasantness should be mitigated.

Regardless of the BBFC's stern warnings, Hinds supervised the shooting of an unchanged script.

The film was directed by Terence Fisher, with a look that belied its modest budget. British TV star Peter Cushing portrayed Baron Victor Frankenstein, and supporting actor Christopher Lee was cast as the imposingly tall, brutish Creature. With a budget of £65,000 and a cast and crew that would become the backbone of later films, Hammer's first Gothic horror went into production. The use of colour encouraged a previously unseen level of gore. Until The Curse of Frankenstein, horror films had not shown blood in a graphic way, or when they did, it was concealed by monochrome photography. In this film, it was bright red, and the camera lingered on it.

The film was an enormous success, not only in Great Britain, but also in the U.S., where it inspired numerous imitations from, amongst others, Roger Corman and American International Pictures (with their series largely based on Edgar Allan Poe – the so-called "Poe Cycle"). It found success on the European continent also, where Italian directors and audiences were particularly receptive.

=== Dracula ===
The huge box office success of The Curse of Frankenstein led to the inevitable desire for a sequel in The Revenge of Frankenstein, and an attempt to give the Hammer treatment to another horror icon. Dracula had been a successful film character for Universal in the past, and the copyright situation was more complicated than for Frankenstein. A legal agreement between Hammer and Universal was not completed until 31 March 1958 – after the film had been shot – and was 80 pages long.

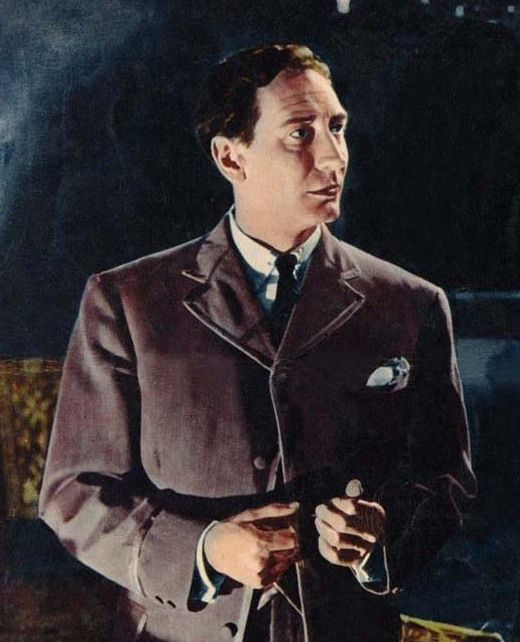
John Van Eyssen as Jonathan Harker

Meanwhile, the financial arrangement between a.a.p. and Hammer had broken down when money promised by a.a.p. had not arrived. Hammer began looking for alternatives, and with the success of The Curse of Frankenstein signed with Columbia Pictures to distribute The Revenge of Frankenstein and two films from the defaulted a.a.p. deal, The Camp on Blood Island and The Snorkel. Hammer's financial success also meant the winding-down of the parent film distribution company Exclusive, leaving Hammer to concentrate on filmmaking.

Work continued on the script for Dracula, and the second draft was submitted to the BBFC. Audrey Field commented on 8 October 1957:

"The uncouth, uneducated, disgusting and vulgar style of Mr Jimmy Sangster cannot quite obscure the remnants of a good horror story, though they do give one the gravest misgivings about treatment. [...] The curse of this thing is the Technicolor blood: why need vampires be messier eaters than anyone else? Certainly strong cautions will be necessary on shots of blood. And of course, some of the stake-work is prohibitive."

Despite the success of The Curse of Frankenstein, the financing of Dracula proved awkward. Universal was not interested, and the search for money eventually brought Hammer back to a.a.p.'s Eliot Hyman, through another of his companies, Seven Arts (which later merged with Warner Bros., now the successor-in-interest to a.a.p.). Although an agreement was drawn up, it is alleged that the deal was never realised and funding for Dracula eventually came from the National Film Finance Council (£33,000) and the rest from Universal in return for worldwide distribution rights. However, recent research suggests that the issue of who exactly funded Dracula is still not entirely clear (see Barnett, 'Hammering out a Deal: The Contractual and Commercial Contexts of The Curse of Frankenstein (1957) and Dracula (1958)’, Historical Journal of Film, Radio and Television, published online 19 November 2013).

With a final budget of £81,412, Dracula began principal photography on 11 November 1957. Peter Cushing again had top-billing, this time as Doctor Van Helsing, whilst Christopher Lee starred as Count Dracula, with direction by Terence Fisher and a set design by Bernard Robinson that was radically different from the Universal adaptation; it was so radical, in fact, that Hammer executives considered paying him off and finding another designer.

Dracula was an enormous success, breaking box-office records in the U.K., the U.S. (where it was released as Horror of Dracula), Canada, and across the world. On 20 August 1958, the Daily Cinema reported:

"Because of the fantastic business done world-wide by Hammer's Technicolor version of Dracula, Universal-International, its distributors, have made over to Jimmy Carreras' organisation, the remake rights to their entire library of classic films."

Establishing the fanged vampire in popular culture, Lee also introduced a dark, brooding sexuality to the character. The academic Christopher Frayling writes, “Dracula introduced fangs, red contact lenses, décolletage, ready-prepared wooden stakes and – in the celebrated credits sequence – blood being spattered from off-screen over the Count's coffin". The film magazine Empire ranked Lee's portrayal as Dracula the 7th Greatest Horror Movie Character of All Time. 1960 saw the release of the first in a long line of sequels, The Brides of Dracula, with Cushing returning to the role of Van Helsing, though Lee did not play Dracula again until Dracula: Prince of Darkness, released in 1966.

=== The Mummy ===
With the agreement in place, Hammer's executives had their pick of Universal International's horror icons and chose to remake The Invisible Man, The Phantom of the Opera, and The Mummy's Hand. All were to be filmed in colour at Bray Studios, by the same team responsible for The Curse of Frankenstein and Dracula. The Mummy (the title used for the remake of The Mummy's Hand, which also incorporated significant story elements from that film's first two sequels, The Mummy's Tomb and The Mummy's Ghost) was made in 1959, The Phantom of the Opera followed in 1962, and Hammer collaborated with William Castle on a remake of The Old Dark House in 1963. The Invisible Man was never produced.

Principal photography for The Mummy began on 23 February 1959 and lasted until 16 April 1959. Once again it starred both Peter Cushing (as John Banning) and Christopher Lee (as Kharis the Mummy), and was directed by Terence Fisher from a screenplay from Jimmy Sangster. The Mummy went into general release on 23 October 1959 and broke the box-office records set by Dracula the previous year, both in Great Britain and the U.S. when it was released there in December.

== Sequels ==
Hammer consolidated their success by turning their most successful films into series. This was a practice they had making Dick Barton movies which they continued to their horror movies and other genres.

=== Quatermass ===
The success of The Quatermass Xperiment (1955; The Creeping Unknown in the U.S.) led to two sequels:

- Quatermass 2 (1957; Enemy from Space in the U.S.)
- Quatermass and the Pit (1967; Five Million Years to Earth in the U.S.)

There were also two Quatermass-style films:

- X the Unknown (1956)
- The Abominable Snowman (1957; The Abominable Snowman of the Himalayas in the U.S.) – also based on a script by Nigel Kneale and directed by Val Guest

=== Frankenstein ===
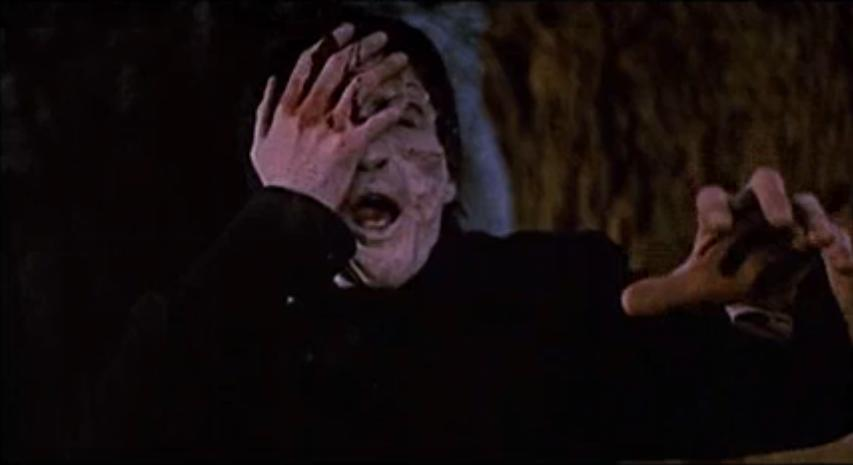
Christopher Lee as the Creature in The Curse of Frankenstein (1957)

Six sequels to The Curse of Frankenstein were released between 1958 and 1974:

- The Revenge of Frankenstein (1958)
- The Evil of Frankenstein (1964)
- Frankenstein Created Woman (1967)
- Frankenstein Must Be Destroyed (1969)
- The Horror of Frankenstein (1970)
- Frankenstein and the Monster from Hell (1974)

All starred Peter Cushing as Baron Frankenstein, except The Horror of Frankenstein (which was not a sequel, but a tongue-in-cheek remake of The Curse of Frankenstein), in which Ralph Bates took the title role. The Evil of Frankenstein stars Cushing but due to an agreement made with Universal to more closely pastiche their version of the Frankenstein story, it re-tells the Baron's history in flashbacks that bear no resemblance to the two earlier Hammer Frankenstein films and it portrays the Baron with a very different personality, resulting in a film which permanently breaks the chronological continuity of the series. Each subsequent movie in the series contains elements that do not relate to (or flatly contradict) the events of the movie that went before, whilst the characteristics of Cushing's Baron vary wildly from film to film, resulting in a series that does not progress as a self-contained narrative cycle.

David Prowse was the only actor to star as the creature twice in the Hammer Frankenstein series; he reprised the role from The Horror of Frankenstein in Frankenstein and the Monster from Hell.

Hammer also produced a half-hour pilot titled Tales of Frankenstein (1958) that was intended to premiere on American television; it was never picked up, but is now available on DVD. Anton Diffring took over Cushing's role of Baron Frankenstein.

=== Dracula ===
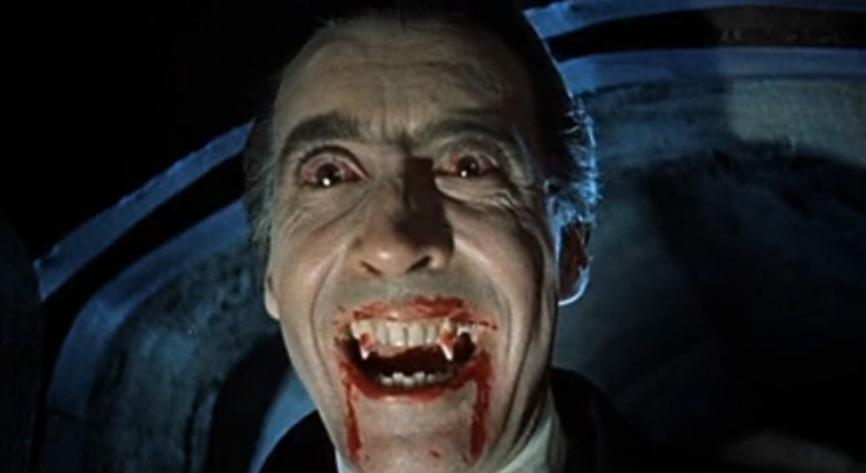
Christopher Lee in Dracula, a.k.a. Horror of Dracula (1958)

Eight sequels to Dracula were released between 1960 and 1974:

- The Brides of Dracula (1960)
- Dracula: Prince of Darkness (1966)
- Dracula Has Risen from the Grave (1968)
- Taste the Blood of Dracula (1970)
- Scars of Dracula (1970)
- Dracula A.D. 1972 (1972)
- The Satanic Rites of Dracula (1973; Count Dracula and his Vampire Bride in the U.S.)
- The Legend of the 7 Golden Vampires (1974; The 7 Brothers Meet Dracula in the U.S.), featuring John Forbes-Robertson as Dracula in place of Christopher Lee.

Peter Cushing appeared in the first and final three sequels (with archive footage also used in Dracula: Prince of Darkness). Christopher Lee appeared in all the sequels except the first and last. The first five sequels were direct sequels to the original. The Brides of Dracula did not include Dracula but is still considered part of the series since Peter Cushing reprises his role as Doctor Van Helsing and battles vampire Baron Meinster (David Peel) and the film makes several direct references to the 1958 original. Christopher Lee returned as Dracula for the following six films, which employed ingenuity in finding new ways to resurrect the Count. Only archive footage of Cushing was used in Dracula: Prince of Darkness and he wouldn't return to the Dracula series until Dracula A.D. 1972. Hammer upped the graphic violence and gore with Scars of Dracula in an attempt to re-imagine the character to appeal to a younger audience, but the movie performed poorly at the box-office which led to a further change of style with the remaining three films. Dracula A.D. 1972 and The Satanic Rites of Dracula were not period pieces like their predecessors, but had a contemporary 1970s London setting. Now set in a new timeline, Peter Cushing appeared in both films, playing Professor Lorrimer Van Helsing, as well as his own grandfather (Lawrence Van Helsing) in the prologue of the first of the two films. Cushing returned for a final time as Professor Van Helsing in the horror / martial arts crossover The Legend of the 7 Golden Vampires, a movie this time set primarily in 1904.

Christopher Lee grew increasingly disillusioned with the direction the character was being taken and with the poor quality of later scripts, although he did improve these slightly himself by adding lines of dialogue from the original novel. Lee speaks at least one line taken from Bram Stoker in every Dracula film he appeared in, except for Dracula: Prince of Darkness in which the Count does not talk at all (Lee claimed repeatedly he was appalled by his dialogue in that film and refused to speak it, but Jimmy Sangster rebutted that no dialogue was written for the character). He was also concerned about typecasting, and after filming The Satanic Rites of Dracula he finally quit the series. John Forbes-Robertson took over the role for one final outing as the Count.

=== The Mummy ===
Three sequels to The Mummy were released between 1964 and 1971:

- The Curse of the Mummy's Tomb (1964)
- The Mummy's Shroud (1967)
- Blood from the Mummy's Tomb (1971)

Peter Cushing and Christopher Lee appeared in none of the Mummy sequels, which had stories and characters unrelated to the 1959 film and all three were relegated to second feature status, as by the mid-1960s, Hammer's films were often intended for double features. Often two films would be shot back-to-back with the same sets and costumes to save money, and then each film would be shown on a separate double feature to prevent audiences noticing any recycling, as for example in The Plague of the Zombies and The Reptile (both 1966). The Curse of the Mummy's Tomb supported the slightly more prestigious The Gorgon, whilst The Mummy's Shroud was a second feature for Frankenstein Created Woman.

Blood from the Mummy's Tomb was a modern-day take on Bram Stoker's The Jewel of Seven Stars and featured Valerie Leon as a reincarnated Egyptian princess, rather than a mummy. The same novel served as the basis for the 1980 Charlton Heston film, The Awakening, and a later direct-to-video feature, Bram Stoker's Legend of the Mummy, starring Lou Gossett Jr.

== Other films ==
=== Horror films ===
Other horror films produced by Hammer included:

- The Hound of the Baskervilles (1959), starring Peter Cushing as Sherlock Holmes
- The Man Who Could Cheat Death (1959)
- The Two Faces of Dr. Jekyll (1960; House of Fright on U.S. TV), a version of Robert Louis Stevenson's Strange Case of Dr Jekyll and Mr Hyde
- The Curse of the Werewolf (1961), Hammer's only werewolf film, and Oliver Reed's first starring role
- The Shadow of the Cat (1961)
- The Phantom of the Opera (1962), starring Herbert Lom
- The Gorgon (1964), again starring Peter Cushing and Christopher Lee
- The Witches (1966), starring Joan Fontaine
- The Plague of the Zombies (1966), directed by John Gilling
- The Reptile (1966), directed by John Gilling
- Rasputin the Mad Monk (1966)
- The Devil Rides Out (1968), adapted from the novel by Dennis Wheatley
- Countess Dracula (1971), directed by Peter Sasdy, based on the stories surrounding the "Blood Countess" Elizabeth Báthory
- Hands of the Ripper (1971), also directed by Peter Sasdy, about the daughter of Jack the Ripper
- Dr. Jekyll and Sister Hyde (1971), another version of Robert Louis Stevenson's Strange Case of Dr Jekyll and Mr Hyde, this time with a gender-swapping twist

=== Vampire films ===
In addition to their Dracula series, Hammer produced a number of other horror movies on the vampire theme, including:

- Kiss of the Vampire (1962; Kiss of Evil on U.S. TV), directed by Don Sharp
- Vampire Circus (1972), directed by Robert Young
- Captain Kronos, Vampire Hunter (1974), directed by Brian Clemens

Hammer also made a loose trilogy of films, known as ″The Karnstein Trilogy″, based on Sheridan Le Fanu's early vampire novella Carmilla, written by newcomer Tudor Gates. These films include:

- The Vampire Lovers (1970), featuring Polish actress Ingrid Pitt in the central role and directed by Roy Ward Baker
- Lust for a Vampire (1971, To Love a Vampire on U.S. TV), directed by Jimmy Sangster
- Twins of Evil (1971), directed by John Hough

=== Psychological thrillers ===
Running alongside production of their 1960s gothic horror films, Hammer made a series of what were known as "mini-Hitchcocks" mostly scripted by Jimmy Sangster, and directed by Freddie Francis and Seth Holt. These low-budget suspense thrillers, often in black-and-white, were made in the mould of Les Diaboliques (1955), although more often compared to the later Psycho. This series of mystery thrillers, which all had twist endings, comprised:

- Taste of Fear (1961; Scream of Fear in the U.S.)
- Maniac (1963)
- Paranoiac (1963)
- Nightmare (1964)
- Hysteria (1965)
- Fanatic (1965; Die! Die! My Darling! in the U.S.)
- The Nanny (1965)
- Crescendo (1970)
- Fear in the Night (1972)
- Demons of the Mind (1972)
- Straight On till Morning (1972)

In addition to these were more traditional thrillers such as:

- The Snorkel (1958)
- Passport to China (1960) a Cold War thriller
- The Full Treatment (1960)

=== Prehistoric films ===
Hammer had some success with films set in (or with strong connections to) the prehistoric/ancient world, including:

- She (1965), based on the novel of the same name by H. Rider Haggard, this starred Ursula Andress and John Richardson alongside Cushing and Lee
- One Million Years B.C. (1966), with Raquel Welch and John Richardson
- Slave Girls (1967; Prehistoric Women in the U.S.), with Martine Beswick
- The Viking Queen (1967)
- The Vengeance of She (1967)
- The Lost Continent (1968), starring Eric Porter, adapted from another Dennis Wheatley novel
- When Dinosaurs Ruled the Earth (1970), directed by Val Guest
- Creatures the World Forgot (1971), directed by Don Chaffey

=== War films ===
Hammer made several war films over the years:

- The Steel Bayonet (1957)
- The Camp on Blood Island (1958)
- Ten Seconds to Hell (1959)
- Yesterday's Enemy (1959)
- The Secret of Blood Island (1965)

=== Comedies ===
Hammer were less well known for their comedies, but they made a number in the 1950s and early 1960s, returning to the genre in the 1970s:

- Up the Creek (1958) and its sequel Further Up the Creek (1958)
- I Only Arsked! (1958)
- Don't Panic Chaps! (1959)
- The Ugly Duckling (1959)
- Watch It, Sailor! (1961)
- A Weekend with Lulu (1961)
- The Old Dark House (1963)
- The Anniversary (1968), with Bette Davis

=== Science fiction ===
Hammer occasionally made science fiction movies. Notable examples were:

- The Damned (1963)
- Moon Zero Two (1969)

=== Swashbucklers ===
Hammer made a number of swashbucklers, including:

- The Men of Sherwood Forest (1954)
- Sword of Sherwood Forest (1960)
- The Pirates of Blood River (1961), a swashbuckler starring Christopher Lee
- Captain Clegg (1962; Night Creatures in the U.S.), an adventure starring Peter Cushing and Oliver Reed
- The Scarlet Blade (1963)
- The Devil-Ship Pirates (1964), a period adventure starring Christopher Lee and Barry Warren
- A Challenge for Robin Hood (1967)

=== Imperial adventure films ===
Hammer had some success with films set in the British Empire, such as:

- The Stranglers of Bombay (1959)
- The Terror of the Tongs (1961)
- The Brigand of Kandahar (1965)

=== Crime films ===
- Hell is a City (1959), a crime thriller starring Stanley Baker
- Never Take Sweets from a Stranger (1960; Never Take Candy from a Stranger in the U.S.), a drama about child abuse starring Patrick Allen and Felix Aylmer
- Cash on Demand (1961)

On 29 May 1968, Hammer was awarded the Queen's Award to Industry in recognition of their contribution to the British economy. The presentation ceremony took place on the steps of the Castle Dracula set at Pinewood Studios, during the filming of Dracula Has Risen from the Grave.

== Last years of film production ==
Hammer films had always sold, in part, on their violent and sexual content. In the late 1960s, with the release of Hollywood films like Bonnie and Clyde, Rosemary's Baby, and The Wild Bunch, the studio struggled to maintain its place in the market. Roman Polanski's Rosemary's Baby was a successful example of psychological horror, while Bonnie and Clyde and The Wild Bunch exposed mainstream audiences to more explicit gore, and were more expertly staged than Hammer films. Meanwhile, George A. Romero's Night of the Living Dead (1968) had set a new standard for graphic violence in horror films.

In 1969 Tony Hinds resigned from the Hammer board and retired from the industry. Hammer was not the same without him; it responded to the new reality by bringing in new writers and directors, testing new characters, and attempting to rejuvenate their vampire and Frankenstein films with new approaches to familiar material. (1974's Frankenstein and the Monster from Hell, for example, features a scene where the Baron treads on a discarded human brain.)

The company soon realised, however, that if they could not be as gory as the new American productions, they could follow a trend in European films of the time and instead play up the sexual content of their films.

While the studio remained true to previous period settings in their 1971 release Vampire Circus, Dracula AD 1972 and The Satanic Rites of Dracula (1973), for example, abandoned period settings in pursuit of a modern-day setting and a "swinging London" feel. The Satanic Rites of Dracula, then called Dracula is Dead... and Well and Living in London, indulged the turn toward self-parody suggested by the title, with some humour appearing in the script, undercutting any sense of horror. These latter films were not successful and drew fire not only from critics but from Christopher Lee himself, who refused to appear in any more Dracula films after these. Speaking at a press conference in 1973 to announce Dracula is Dead... and Well and Living in London, Lee said:

"I'm doing it under protest... I think it is fatuous. I can think of twenty adjectives – fatuous, pointless, absurd. It's not a comedy, but it's got a comic title. I don't see the point."

=== TV adaptations ===
Hammer Films had commercial success with some atypical output during this period, with film versions of several British TV situation comedies, most notably the ITV series On the Buses (1971). The first spin-off made was Hammer's biggest domestic earner of the 1970s and was popular enough to produce two sequels, Mutiny on the Buses (1972) and Holiday on the Buses (1973), seeing Hammer return to their pre-horror practice of adapting television properties for the cinema as they had once done with PC 49 and Dick Barton.

Other adaptations included:

- Nearest and Dearest (1972)
- That's Your Funeral (1972)
- Love Thy Neighbour (1973)
- Man at the Top (1973)
- Man About the House (1974)

=== Final films ===
In the latter part of the 1970s, Hammer made fewer films, and attempts were made to break away from the then-unfashionable Gothic horror films on which the studio had built its reputation. The Legend of the 7 Golden Vampires (1974), a co-production with Hong Kong's Shaw Brothers which attempted to combine Hammer's brand of horror with the then popular martial arts genre, and To the Devil a Daughter (1976), their third adaptation of a Dennis Wheatley novel, were both quite successful at the U.K. box office, but Hammer was unable to capitalise on them as most of the profits went to other financial backers.

Hammer Films struggled on throughout the 1970s before going into liquidation in 1979. Hammer's last production, in 1979, was a remake of Alfred Hitchcock's 1938 thriller The Lady Vanishes, starring Elliott Gould and Cybill Shepherd. (The Encyclopedia of British Film characterized the remake as "about as witless and charmless as could be conceived".)

== Attempted revival ==
In July 1993, it was reported Richard and Lauren Shuler Donner had acquired 200 titles of Hammer's library from rights holder Roy Skeggs with the intention of remaking them for film and television. The following month it was reported Warner Bros. had signed a deal with the Donners to develop the new Hammer projects. The first of the intended Hammer remakes was to be a $40-50 million remake of The Quatermass Xperiment to be titled Xperiment and written by Dan O'Bannon with either Sean Connery or Anthony Hopkins eyed to play Bernard Quatermass along with remakes of Quatermass 2 and Quatermass and the Pit and possibly further installments should Xperiment prove successful. In addition to relaunching the Quatermass series, the Donners also planned remakes of The Devil Rides Out, Stolen Face, and Taste of Fear. In addition to remaking established Hammer titles, the Donners also planned to produce new films under the Hammer name such as an adaptation of the Andrew Laurence novel The Hiss titled Hideous Whispers slated to be directed by Richard Donner, Psychic Detective, and a John Hough directed film titled Children of the Wolf. Additional plans were made for a Twilight Zone style anthology series to be titled The Haunted House of Hammer with a planned 44 one-hour episode commitment, 22 of which would be filmed in the United Kingdom while the other 22 would be filmed in the United States. Ultimately, despite interest expressed by both the press and Warner Bros., nothing ultimately came of this deal and the Hammer revival was abandoned. According to a 2012 The New York Times article, the deal fell part behind the scenes because Hammer didn't actually own most of its best known properties.

== Brand-name resurrection (2007–present) ==
In the 2000s, although the company seemed to be in hibernation, frequent announcements had been made of new projects. In 2003, for example, the studio announced plans to work with Australian company Pictures in Paradise to develop new horror films for the DVD and cinema market. On 10 May 2007, it was announced that Dutch producer John De Mol had purchased the Hammer Films rights via his private equity firm Cyrte Investments. In addition to holding the rights to over 300 Hammer films, De Mol's company plans to restart the studio. According to an article in Variety detailing the transaction, the new Hammer Films was to be run by former Liberty Global execs Simon Oakes and Marc Schipper. In addition, Guy East and Nigel Sinclair of L.A.-based Spitfire Pictures are on board to produce two to three horror films or thrillers a year for the U.K.-based studio. The first output under the new owners is Beyond the Rave, a contemporary vampire story which premièred free online, exclusively, on Myspace in April 2008 as a 20 × 4 min. serial.

The company began shooting a new horror/thriller film in County Donegal in 2008, backed by the Irish Film Board. The film is titled Wake Wood and was scheduled for release in the United Kingdom in the autumn of 2009. The film was produced in collaboration with the Swedish company Solid Entertainment, makers of the vampire film Frostbiten, which pays homage to the Hammer vampire films among others. It was given a limited UK/Ireland theatrical release in March 2011. In the summer of 2009, Hammer produced in the U.S. The Resident, a thriller directed and co-written by Finnish filmmaker Antti Jokinen and starring Hilary Swank, Jeffrey Dean Morgan and Christopher Lee. It was released in the US and UK in March 2011. In 2010, Hammer, in partnership with Overture Films and Relativity Media, released Let Me In, a remake of Swedish vampire film Let the Right One In.

In June 2010, it was announced that Hammer acquired Wake, a script by Chris Borrelli for an action feature to be directed by Danish filmmaker Kasper Barfoed. In February 2012, the Hammer and Alliance Films adaptation of The Woman in Black was released. Daniel Radcliffe stars as lawyer Arthur Kipps. Jane Goldman wrote the film's screenplay, with James Watkins in the director's chair. In April 2012, the company announced it was to make a sequel to The Woman in Black titled The Woman in Black: Angel of Death. Also in 2012, Hammer and Alliance Films announced two more films going into production during 2012, entitled The Quiet Ones and Gaslight. The Quiet Ones tells the story of an unorthodox professor (Jared Harris) who uses controversial methods and leads his best students off the grid to take part in a dangerous experiment: to create a poltergeist. It was released on 10 April 2014 in the UK and 25 April in the US.

After a few quiet years, the film The Lodge had its world premiere at the Sundance Film Festival on 25 January 2019. It was scheduled to be released on 15 November 2019, by NEON.

In September 2019, Hammer signed a worldwide distribution deal with StudioCanal for its catalogue.

In November 2021, it was announced Network Distributing had united with Hammer to form Hammer Studios Ltd. In August 2023, it was announced Hammer Film Productions, its affiliated companies, and back catalogue had been acquired by the John Gore Organisation.

In July 2022, Hammer Film Productions Ltd was incorporated by independent filmmaker and writer, Ronan Williams via Companies House in the UK.

=== Current films ===
- Beyond the Rave (2008)
- Let Me In (2010)
- The Resident (2011)
- Wake Wood (2011)
- The Woman in Black (2012)
- The Quiet Ones (2014)
- The Woman in Black: Angel of Death (2015)
- The Lodge (2019)
- Doctor Jekyll (2023)

== Critical response ==
In my early teens I went with groups of friends to see certain films. If we saw the logo of Hammer, we knew it was going to be a very special picture. A surprising experience. And shocking.

— Martin Scorsese on the heyday of the horror movie.

Hammer's horror films were often praised by critics for their visual style, although rarely taken seriously. "Altogether this is a horrific film and sometimes a crude film, but by no means an unimpressive piece of melodramatic storytelling" wrote one critic of Dracula in The Times in 1958. Critics who specialise in cult films, like Kim Newman, have praised Hammer Horror more fully, enjoying their atmosphere, craftsmanship and occasional camp appeal. In A History of Horror, Mark Gatiss remarked that Hammer's earlier films were taken seriously at the time, in comparison to the trademark camp appeal of their later works.

In a 2013 retrospective for The Guardian, Michael Newton wrote:

Shot in Eastmancolor, the first batch of Hammer Horror movies – Terence Fisher's The Curse of Frankenstein (1957), Dracula (1958) and The Mummy (1959) – are among the loveliest-looking British films of the decade... The early Hammer films offer a last gasp of British romanticism, the solid sets drenched in a soft brilliance of shadows, of greys, reds and blues; when these films stray into the far woods, it's always autumn there, never spring. The leaves fall, and the light shines golden and clear; compared with the well-lit contemporary look of the "angry young men" films, Hammer's mournful sumptuousness must have been even more striking. They play out a 1950s reverie of contagion, lust and post-Suez anxiety. Questions of guilt circulate in these films, where the virtuous can be transformed into vampires through one moment of sexual weakness...

== Television series ==
=== Journey to the Unknown ===
This was a fantasy, science fiction and supernatural anthology series which dealt with normal people in everyday situations that found themselves having to experience something out of the ordinary. 17 episodes of approximately 50 minutes each were produced by Hammer Film Productions and 20th Century Fox Television. In America, eight episodes from the series were broadcast as four made-for-television films consisting of twinned episodes along with new segment introduction footage provided by actors Patrick McGoohan, Sebastian Cabot and Joan Crawford serving as hosts. The series was first aired on ABC from 26 September, 1968 to 30 January, 1969, prior to broadcast in the UK on ITV in 1969.

=== Hammer House of Horror ===
In 1980, Hammer Films created an anthology series for British television, Hammer House of Horror. Shown on ITV, it ran for 13 episodes with a running length of approximately 54 minutes each. In a break from their cinema format, these self-contained episodes featured plot twists which usually saw the protagonists fall into the hands of that episode's horror at the end. The series featured a different kind of horror each week, including witches, werewolves, ghosts, devil worship and voodoo, but also included non-supernatural horror themes such as cannibalism, confinement and serial killers. All the stories were set in contemporary England.

=== Hammer House of Mystery and Suspense ===
A second television anthology series, Hammer House of Mystery and Suspense, was produced in 1984 and ran for 13 episodes. The stories were originally to have been the same 54 min. length as their previous series, but it was decided to expand them to feature-length to market them as 'movies of the week' in the US. The running time varied from 69 to 73 minutes. The series was made in association with 20th Century Fox (who broadcast films as Fox Mystery Theater) and as such, the sex and violence seen in the earlier series was toned down considerably for US television. Each episode featured a star, often American, known to US viewers. This series was Hammer's final production of the 20th century, and the studio went into semi-permanent hiatus.

== See also ==
- Hammer filmography
- House of Hammer
- Cinema of the United Kingdom

== Bibliography ==
- (in French) Frankenstein, Dracula et les autres sous les feux de la Hammer, Daniel Bastié, Editions Grand Angle, 2015, p.227
- Hardy, Phil (1986). Encyclopedia of Horror Movies. London: Octopus Books. ISBN 978-0-06-096146-6.
- Hearn, Marcus; Barnes, Alan (1997). The Hammer Story. London: Titan Books. ISBN 978-1-84576-185-1.
- Kinsey, Wayne (2005). Hammer Films: The Bray Studios Years. Richmond: Reynolds & Hearn. ISBN 978-1-903111-44-4.
- McKay, Sinclair (2007). A Thing of Unspeakable Horror: The History of Hammer Films. London: Aurum Press. ISBN 978-1-84513-249-1.
- Meikle, Denis (1996). A History of Horrors – The Rise and Fall of the House of Hammer. Lanham: Scarecrow Press. ISBN 978-0-8108-6354-5.
- Pixley, Andrew (2005). The Quatermass Collection – Viewing Notes. London: BBC Worldwide. BBCDVD1478.
- Rigby, Jonathan (2000). English Gothic: A Century of Horror Cinema. Richmond: Reynolds & Hearn. ISBN 978-1-903111-01-7.
- Sheridan, Bob (March 1978). "History of Hammer: Pre-Horror Hammer 1935–1956". The House of Hammer. 2 (6). London: Top Sellers.
- Johnson, Tom (1996). Hammer Films: An Exhaustive Filmography. North Carolina: McFarland. ISBN 0-7864-0034-X.
