= John Hamill =

British actor (born 1947)

- Born: 3 May 1947 (age 79); Shepherd's Bush, London, England
- Years active: 1960s – 1989

John Hamill (born 3 May 1947) is an English former actor and model.

== Biography ==
He attended the Elliott School, Putney from 1958 to 1962 before becoming a bodybuilder and one of Britain's most popular 'physique models' in the mid-1960s. Turning to acting, he studied at the Webber Douglas Academy of Dramatic Art, then appeared in the West End as Jimmy in There's a Girl in My Soup (1967–68) and Cowboy in The Boys in the Band (1969–70).

Hamill's background as a physique model, which included cover appearances on several beefcake publications and the occasional 8 mm 'posing strap' film, earned him a considerable gay following, which is still visible on the internet today. It would also prove good training for his later nude appearances in David Grant's sex films and nudity-ridden horror titles like Tower of Evil (1972). In the latter, Hamill's role is synopsised by The Bare Facts Video Guide as "Buns, walking with Penny, then more buns, rolling into the water, dead." He also appeared as artist Alan Street opposite Sue Longhurst in a trilogy of British sex comedies, comprising The Over-Amorous Artist (1974), Girls Come First (1975) and Under the Bed (1977).

Hamill's other film appearances included Trog (1970), No Blade of Grass (1970), Travels with My Aunt (1972) and Hardcore (1977). Television appearances included Crossroads, The Shadow of the Tower, Space: 1999, The Venturers, 1990, Doctor Who (in the 1978 serial The Ribos Operation), Dennis Potter's play Double Dare, and The Professionals.

He retired from acting in the late 1980s. His last known TV appearance was in an episode of The Bill in 1989.

== Selected filmography ==
- A Dandy in Aspic (1968) – uncredited
- Every Home Should Have One (1970) as Porridge Eater #1
- The Beast in the Cellar (1970) as Alan Marlow
- Trog (1970) as Cliff
- No Blade of Grass (1970) as Roger Burnham
- Tower of Evil (1972) as Gary
- Travels with My Aunt (1972) as Crowder's Man
- The National Health (1973) as Kenny
- The Over-Amorous Artist (1974) as Alan Street
- Girls Come First (1975) as Alan Street
- Under the Bed (1977) as Alan Street
- Hardcore (1977) as Daniel
- Mannen i skuggan (1978) as Dan

== See also ==
- Sue Longhurst
- Fiona Richmond
- Hazel O'Connor
