= Can You Keep It Up for a Week? =

1974 British film directed by Jim Atkinson

Can You Keep It Up For A Week?
- Directed by: Jim Atkinson
- Written by: Robin Gough
- Starring: Jeremy Bulloch; Neil Hallett; Jill Damas; Sue Longhurst; Richard O'Sullivan; Valerie Leon
- Cinematography: Ricky Briggs
- Edited by: David Docker
- Music by: Dave Quincy
- Production company: Pyramid Films
- Release date: 1974
- Country: United Kingdom
- Language: English

Can You Keep It Up For A Week? is a 1974 British sex comedy film directed by Jim Atkinson and starring Jeremy Bulloch, Sue Longhurst, Neil Hallett, Richard O'Sullivan and Valerie Leon.

== Plot ==
Accident-prone Gil wants a steady job but is dismissed by every company that recruits him due to his unfortunate habit of ending up in sexually embarrassing situations. His girlfriend Annette says that she will marry him only if he can stay employed for at least a week.

Hired by Mr Grimwood's cleaning company "Here To Service You", Gil is unwittingly drawn into a series of bawdy misadventures: sharing a bath with a married woman and getting caught by her husband; having a threesome with a hospital patient and a woman doctor, followed by a foursome with Annette, Grimwood and a woman psychologist; awkward encounters with a gay man and a lesbian; and getting caught by Annette playing strip poker with a group of women.

Incredibly, Gil remains in his job, so Annette asks Grimwood to fire him, not knowing that Gil's employer wants to seduce her himself. Gil foils this plot and Annette marries him, but before the couple can have their wedding night Gil collapses on the bed and passes out from exhaustion.

== Cast ==
- Jeremy Bulloch as Gil
- Sue Longhurst as Mrs Bristol
- Neil Hallett as Gerry Grimwood
- Richard O'Sullivan as Mr Rose
- Valerie Leon as Miss Hampton
- Jill Damas as Annette
- Olivia Munday as Mrs Hobson
- Mark Singleton as Mr Hobson
- Joy Harington as Mrs Grimwood
- Jenny Cox as Dr Livingstone
- Venicia Day as Sue Anne Stanley
- Stephanie Marrian as Lesley
- Wendy Wax as Baby Doll
- Sarah Frampton as Pam
- Lindsay Marsh as Gigi
- Maria Coyne as receptionist
- Lynne Ross as secretary
- Valerie Phillips as mechanic
- Frances Bennett as lady driver
- Sally Harrison as car wash customer
- Sally Lahee as Madam Chairman
- Richard Smith as applicant
- Bridget McConnell as secretary
- Roy Beck as sailor
- Nicholas McArdle as The D.O.G.
- Jules Walters as John Thomas
- Eddie Sommer as male streaker
- Mandy Morris as female streaker

== Background ==
Elton Hawke, who is listed as a producer on the movie, is a pseudonym used by Kent Walton and Hazel Adair. Walton was a British television sports commentator, and Adair was the co creator of the soap opera Crossroads. The revelation was first broadcast in a 1975 episode of the TV documentary series Man Alive.

== Critical reception ==
Writing for The Monthly Film Bulletin, David McGillivray listed the film's "fundamental deficiencies" as "dreary sexual encounters, rudimentary direction and 94 minutes of witless Old English puns (the title is a fair example)." He likened the "episodic" plot to those of other sex comedies Secrets of a Door-to-Door Salesman (1973) and Confessions of a Window Cleaner (1974).

The Northern Echo said the film was a "ghastly near–blue bore", while Time Out Magazine called it an "embarrassing British sex comedy", and were also surprised "that it took as long as 12 days to shoot," and the Dorset Echo commented that it was just "yet another in an ever growing line of British sex comedies." Author Robert Murphy opined that it was an "endearing innocent sex–comedy that Atkinson directs with breezy good humour, and the film was a box–office success."
