= The Informer (TV series) =

- Created by: John Whitney; Geoffrey Bellman
- Starring: Ian Hendry; Heather Sears; Jean Marsh; Neil Hallett; Tony Selby
- Country of origin: United Kingdom
- No. of series: 2
- No. of episodes: 21 (19 missing)

Production
- Producers: Stella Richman; Peter Collinson; John Whitney
- Production company: Rediffusion Television

Original release
- Network: ITV
- Release: 3 August 1966 – 18 December 1967

The Informer is a British drama series that starred Ian Hendry, it was broadcast in two series in 1966 and 1967. Most episodes are considered lost, but two have survived.

== Plot ==
A former barrister Alex Lambert (played by Ian Hendry) who had been disgraced and disbarred has to rebuild his life. He uses his former contacts on both sides of the law to become a paid informer for the Police. Living well from the rewards paid by insurance companies, Lambert still has to hide his activities from both his wife and others behind a new persona in the guise as a business consultant.Other regulars in the series included Jean Marsh as Hendry's character's wife, Heather Sears as his mistress, and Neil Hallett. Guest actors included Peter Bowles, Peter Vaughan, Trevor Bannister, George Cole, Nerys Hughes, David Kelly, Murray Melvin, Eric Pohlmann, John Carson, Nicholas Courtney, Dudley Foster, Tracy Reed, Pauline Delaney and Roberta Tovey.

Currently, only "Get Off My Back", the first episode of season one, and "Your Money of Your Life", the penultimate episode of season two, exist in the archives. The rest of the series is missing, presumed wiped.

== Cast ==
Actor	Role
Ian Hendry	Alex Lambert
Heather Sears	Janet Lambert
Jean Marsh	Sylvia Parrish
Neil Hallett	DS Piper
Tony Selby	Tony Cass
Bryan Marshall	Briggs (1 episode)

== Episodes ==
Series	Episodes	Originally released	
Series	Episodes	First released	Last released
1	8	3 August 1966	21 September 1966
2	13	25 September 1967	18 December 1967

=== Series 1 (1966) ===
No. overall	No. in series	Title	Original release date
1	1	"Get Off my Back"	3 August 1966
2	2	"A Word in your Ear Brother"	10 August 1966
3	3	"It's an Unfair World, Baxter"	17 August 1966
4	4	"In Memoriam"	24 August 1966
5	5	"One for Sorrow"	31 August 1966
6	6	"Two for Joy"	7 September 1966
7	7	"Don't Call Us, We'll Call You"	14 September 1966
8	8	"When You Shake Hands with a Greek"	21 September 1966

=== Series 2 (1967) ===
No. overall	No. in series	Title	Original release date
9	1	"Undisclosed Sources"	25 September 1967
10	2	"Here's Where Who Takes Over?"	2 October 1967
11	3	"The Sacrifice"	9 October 1967
12	4	"Mutual Protection"	16 October 1967
13	5	"A Mouthful of Silver Spoons"	23 October 1967
14	6	"Where There's Muck, There's Money"	30 October 1967
15	7	"No Further Questions"	6 November 1967
16	8	"Your Secrets are Safe with Us, Mr Lambert"	13 November 1967
17	9	"Keep off the Grass"	20 November 1967
18	10	"Lets Sleeping Dogs Lie"	27 November 1967
19	11	"Study in the Nude"	4 December 1967
20	12	"Your Money or Your Life"	11 December 1967
21	13	"The Flat Season"	18 December 1967
