= Keep It Up, Jack =

1974 British film by Derek Ford

- Directed by: Derek Ford
- Screenplay by: Alan Selwyn; Derek Ford
- Produced by: Michael L. Green
- Starring: Mark Jones; Sue Longhurst; Linda Regan; Frank Thornton; Queenie Watts; Paul Whitsun-Jones; Maggi Burton; Steve Veidor; Jennifer Westbrook
- Cinematography: Geoff Glover
- Edited by: Pat Foster
- Music by: Terry Warr
- Production company: Blackwater Films
- Distributed by: Variety Film Distributors
- Release date: 27 March 1974; (United Kingdom)
- Running time: 84 minutes
- Country: United Kingdom
- Language: English

Keep It Up, Jack is a 1974 British sex comedy film directed by Derek Ford and starring Mark Jones and Sue Longhurst. It was written by Ford and Alan Selwyn, and produced by Michael L. Green.

== Plot ==
Jack James is an unsuccessful music hall entertainer and drag artist who inherits a brothel from his late aunt, and impersonates her in order to seduce the female clients.

== Cast ==
- Mark Jones as Jack
- Sue Longhurst as Virginia
- Linda Regan as Gloria
- Frank Thornton as Mr. Clarke
- Queenie Watts as charlady
- Paul Whitsun-Jones as Mr. Fairbrother
- Maggi Burton as Fleur
- Steve Veidor as Muscles
- Jennifer Westbrook as Caroline

== Production ==
The film also exists in a version with hardcore inserts, but there is no suggestion that any of the credited cast participated in it.

In 2022 Dark Force Entertainment released the longer, hardcore version of the film on blu-ray.

== Critical reception ==
Monthly Film Bulletin said "An extended series of charades, played round a none too substantial comic theme. The plot is left to totter haphazardly from one situation to the next, while Mark Jones zips through from one costume change to the next, displaying commendable physical facility but scarcely one memorable personality amongst all the opportunities provided. When out of drag, he comes across as a close impersonation of Norman Wisdom."

In The Guardian, Derek Malcolm wrote: "You would think that with a modicum of talent, the film might either be mildly erotic or passably funny. But, believe me, it is not. Just deeply embarrassing, and deadly dull. If this is what the British film industry is mostly engaged in, the quicker it finally expires the better. It's a terrible sin to make sex so boring."

Time Out wrote: "Screamingly unfunny farce in which a tenth-rate seaside quick-change artist inherits a brothel, and finds himself for some unfathomable reason acting first the part of the recently expired madam, and then that of her clients. Hence the title gag, such as it is. If you miss it the first time round, there's a chorus of voices off and even a theme song to remind you. What with performers who enunciate like rejects from a RADA elocution course, a script that must have taken all of a weekend to elaborate, a handful of arbitrary flesh shots, and a relentlessly one-note sense of humour (off-key, of course), it is hardly hyperbolic to see Keep It Up, Jack! as defining a whole new low in British comedy."
