= Judy Matheson =

British actress

- Education: New College of Speech and Drama
- Occupation: Actress
- Years active: 1967–present
- Spouse: Paul Freeman (m. 1967, divorced)

Judy Matheson is a British actress notable for her appearances in several horror films in the 1970s. She also appeared in many other films and television series.

== Career ==
Raised in Essex and trained at the New College of Speech and Drama, Matheson began her career in 1967 with the Bristol Old Vic Theatre Company with which she toured the United States, including a season on Broadway, and Canada, followed by Europe and Israel, in three of Shakespeare's plays, the highlight of which was Sir Tyrone Guthrie's production of Measure for Measure.

In 1967, Matheson signed with talent agency Hazel Malone Management. Her debut film The Chairman (The Most Dangerous Man in the World), starred Gregory Peck. She was chosen to star in the Spanish film The Exquisite Cadaver (Las Crueles) with Capucine, directed by Vicente Aranda, in 1969, which was showcased as the Spanish entry at the San Sebastian Film Festival. In 1970, she was invited to play Helen Mirren's friend in John Goldschmidt's documentary Doing Her Own Thing about Mirren's early years at the Royal Shakespeare Company.

In 1971 she starred opposite Freddie Jones in Charles Wood's experimental drama The Emergence of Anthony Purdy, Esq. directed by Patrick Dromgoole for Harlech Television. It was chosen that year as ITV's entry in the Monte Carlo TV Festival. In the 1970s, she appeared in the Hammer Horror films Lust for a Vampire and Twins of Evil. Her other films include The Flesh and Blood Show, The House That Vanished (also known as Scream and Die), Crucible of Terror, Confessions of a Window Cleaner and Percy's Progress.

Matheson's television work includes City '68, Spindoe, Coronation Street, Z-Cars (twice, leading female), Crossroads, (Hugh Mortimer's secretary and Sandy's girlfriend), Harriet's Back in Town, The Adventurer, Dead of Night, The Professionals, The Sweeney, Shelley (BBC film of the poet, opposite Robert Powell and directed by Alan Bridges), Blake's 7 and Citizen Smith.

Matheson's theatre work includes two national tours of Marc Camoletti's Boeing-Boeing. She also starred in Funny Peculiar at the Gateway Theatre, Chester.

In February 1979, she starred in a production of Alan Ayckbourn's Bedroom Farce at Sheffield's Crucible Theatre.

She undertook the narration for "Mary Millington on Location", part of the special features for the Mary Millington box set released by Screenbound Entertainment in 2020.

In 2020 she played a cameo role( Agatha) in Andrew Jones’ film The Haunting of Margam Castle.

In 2021, Matheson played Sir Tony Robinson's wife in a short film Joe's Journey, written by Tony Husband, to raise awareness of dementia, which both Robinson's and Husband's fathers had suffered from.

== Selected credits ==
=== Film ===
| Year | Title | Role | Notes |
|---|---|---|---|
| 1969 | The Chairman | Student | Uncredited |
| 1969 | The Exquisite Cadaver | Esther | |
| 1971 | Lust for a Vampire | Amanda McBride | |
| 1971 | Twins of Evil | Woodman's Daughter | |
| 1971 | Crucible of Terror | Marcia | |
| 1972 | The Flesh and Blood Show | Jane | |
| 1973 | The House That Vanished | Lorna Collins | |
| 1974 | Confessions of a Window Cleaner | Elvie | |
| 1974 | Percy's Progress | Maria | |
| 1976 | High as a Kite | Girl | |
| 2017 | Frankula | Vera Vomit | Short film |
| 2019 | Vampirella | Narrator | Voice |
| 2021 | Joe's Journey | Joe's wife | Short film |
| 2024 | Dragon | Madame Drakaina | Short film |
| 2025 | A Working Man | Elegant Diner | Uncredited |

=== Television ===
| Year | Title | Role | Notes |
|---|---|---|---|
| 1967 | City '68 | Len's girlfriend | Episode: "The Shooting War" |
| 1968 | Spindoe | Maid | 2 episodes |
| 1968 | B-And-B | Preta | Episode: "Come to the Aid of the Party" |
| 1969 | Coronation Street | Nurse | Episode: "#1.924" |
| 1970 | The Emergence of Anthony Purdy, Esq. | Phillipa | TV film |
| 1972 | Shelley | Jane Williams | TV film |
| 1972 | Dead of Night | Tessa | Episode: "Two in the Morning" |
| 1973 | The Adventurer | Claire Adams | Episode: "Full Fathom Five" |
| 1973 | Harriet's Back in Town | Sarah Chivers | 4 episodes |
| 1976 | Z-Cars | Terri | Episode: "The Frighteners" |
| 1976 | The Sweeney | Kibber's Girlfriend | Episode: "Selected Target" |
| 1977 | Crossroads | Vicky Lambert | 13 episodes |
| 1978 | The Professionals | Mandy Mitchell | Episode: "Long Shot" |
| 1978 | Z-Cars | Miss Andrews | Episode: "Rummage" |
| 1979 | Citizen Smith | Caroline | Episode: "The Party's Over" |
| 1980 | Blake's 7 | Mutoid | Episode: "Volcano" |
| 2020 | Bruised Sky | Judy | Episode: "Spy" |
| 2020 | The Haunting of Margam Castle | Agatha | TV film |
| 2021 | The Lives of Frankie Abbot | Grace | Both episodes |
| 2021 | What Did You Do in the War, Mama? | Mrs Lloyd George | TV film |
| 2024 | Saucy! Secrets of The British Sex Comedy | Herself | Interviewee |
