= The Game Is Over =

- Directed by: Roger Vadim
- Screenplay by: Jean Cau; Roger Vadim; Bernard Frechtman
- Based on: La Curée by Émile Zola
- Produced by: Mario Sarago; Roger Vadim
- Starring: Jane Fonda; Peter McEnery; Michel Piccoli
- Cinematography: Claude Renoir
- Edited by: Victoria Mercanton
- Music by: Jean Bouchéty; Jean-Pierre Bourtayre
- Production companies: Les Films Marceau (Paris); Cocinor; Mega Film (Rome)
- Distributed by: Royal Films International; Columbia Pictures (US)
- Release dates: June 22, 1966 (France); January 9, 1967 (USA)
- Running time: 98 minutes
- Countries: France; Italy
- Box office: 2,558,254 admissions (France)

The Game Is Over (original title La Curée, "The Kill") is a 1966 drama film directed by Roger Vadim and starring Jane Fonda, Peter McEnery, and Michel Piccoli. The film is a modern-day adaptation of the 1871-72 novel La Curée by Émile Zola. Two different versions of the film were made and released, one in English, the other in French.

== Synopsis ==
In Paris, Maxime Saccard visits his wealthy industrialist father Alexandre and his beautiful young Canadian wife, Renée. Alexandre fathered Maxime years ago in a prior marriage and Maxime has come to stay with them after studying in England.

Renée tells Maxime that she married Alexandre when she was pregnant following an unhappy love affair; the child was stillborn and the passion between the two has faded.

Renée and Maxime begin an affair and fall in love with each other. Renée, who came from a wealthy family, asks Alexandre for a divorce. He agrees, on the condition that she leaves the fortune she brought to their marriage invested in his business.

Renée accepts this and goes to Switzerland for a divorce. But while she is away, Alexandre confronts his son with two alternatives: he can either run off with the now penniless Renée or become engaged to Anne Sernet, the daughter of a wealthy banker whose support Alexandre wants for his business. Maxime agrees on the second course of action.

Renée returns from Switzerland to find Alexandre holding a ball celebrating Maxime's engagement to Anne. Renée throws herself into the pool to kill herself – but then changes her mind and dripping wet enters the party. Alexandre escorts her to the gymnasium, where she sits and stares into an empty future.

== Cast ==
- Jane Fonda: Renée Saccard
- Peter McEnery: Maxime Saccard
- Michel Piccoli: Alexandre Saccard
- Tina Aumont: Anne Sernet
- Jacques Monod: M. Sernet
- Howard Vernon: Lawyer
- Douglas Read: Hotel manager
- Ham-Chau Luong: M. Chou
- Germaine Montero: Guest
- Simone Valère: Mme. Sernet (uncredited)
- Dominique Zardi: Guest (uncredited)

== Production ==
The movie was one of a series Vadim made based on a classic text. He described the book as "about high society in Paris with a rather serious background, since it likens dogs turning on a deer in a hunt to people."

"I am making no attempt to give the wide sociological picture that Zola did", added Vadim. "I am not a naturalist or a moralist. The Zola characters were hardly everyday. There was something fantastic about them, though they have their counterparts today, as I hope to show."

Vadim and Jane Fonda married immediately prior to making the film.

It was only the second film performance of Tina Aumont.

The movie was shot in both English and French versions. Fonda acted in French and English. "I said it was hard enough to shoot anything once", she said. "But doing it twice, I found, seemed perfectly natural.

"I love working in French", she added. "I feel a certain kind of freedom. The way you feel when you learn to speak a foreign language and find you can say things you wouldn't dare say in English."

Peter McEnery did not speak French so when shooting the French version he had to learn his lines phonetically and a French actor was then dubbed in for him.

Fonda appears in some nude scenes which were explicit for the time. She said later about shooting these:

You have to be relaxed, free. Pornography begins when things become self-conscious. But the set was cleared and closed, and I knew Vadim would protect me in the cutting room. Months later we discovered that a photographer had hidden in the rafters and taken pictures which he sold to Playboy. It rocked me, it really did. It's a simple matter of breaking and entering, and invasion of privacy.

== Reception ==
The movie was a solid box office success in France, where it received mostly good reviews. It was the tenth most popular movie at the French box office in 1966. When the film screened at the Venice Film Festival, however, critical reception was hostile.

When the movie was screened commercially in Italy later, all copies were seized on the grounds of obscenity. The Italian producer and 23 cinema owners were charged. Vadim and Fonda were not charged.

=== US Release ===
The Game Is Over received mostly negative reviews in the US. Critics praised the cinematography by Claude Renoir, but called the film's story and dialogue trite. The New York Times reviewer Bosley Crowther wrote that the film "has absolutely nothing in it but fancy clothes and decor", while critic Roger Ebert called it "a tedious and ridiculous film of great physical beauty". The Washington Post called it "this deliciously false and phony picture".

However the Los Angeles Times called it Vadim's "best film since Les Liaisons Dangereuses and the finest of Miss Fonda's career... Rarely has Vadim's style been so expressive."

== Home media ==
The English speaking version was released on VHS by Video Treasures and Media Home Entertainment in the late 1980s.

La Curée, the somewhat shorter French-language cut, came out on DVD in 2003, though its jacket cover misleadingly displays the title applicable to the English version.
