= Noreen Kershaw =

English television actress and director (born 1950)

- Born: Noreen Kershaw; 16 October 1950 (age 75); Bury, Lancashire, England
- Occupations: Television actress, television director

Noreen Kershaw (born 16 October 1950) is an English television actress and director.

She trained at the Manchester Polytechnic School of Theatre and Liverpool's Everyman Theatre, originated the title role of the play Shirley Valentine, later made famous by Pauline Collins. She was seen in the BBC television series Life on Mars, as WPC Phyllis Dobbs, the desk officer.

She had previously played the roles of Kathy Roach in Channel 4's Brookside 1988–1990, Lynne Harrison in Granada Television's Albion Market 1985–1986, and Joyce Wilson in the long-running Granada TV sitcom, Watching.

She has directed episodes of the top-rated ITV1 soap opera, Coronation Street, and Channel 4's comedy drama, Shameless, ITV1 soap opera Emmerdale and Heartbeat, and BBC Scotland"s River City.

In 2008, she directed the feature film Act of Grace.

In 2022, she was a director of the ITV police procedural drama Ridley.
