= The Office Party =

1976 film directed by David Grant

- Directed by: David Grant
- Edited by: John Shirley
- Music by: John Shakespeare; Derek Warne
- Production company: Oppidan Film Productions
- Release date: 4 July 1976
- Running time: 55 minutes
- Country: United Kingdom
- Language: English

The Office Party is a 1976 British sex comedy directed by David Grant and starring Alan Lake, Johnny Briggs, Pamela Grafton, Ellie Reece-Knight and Theresa Wood. It depicts the sexual misadventures of staff enjoying an office party where a blue movie is one of the main attractions. A hardcore export version also exists.

== Cast ==
- Alan Lake as Mr. Barnes
- Johnny Briggs as Peter
- Pamela Grafton as Miss Peabody
- Ellie Reece-Knight as Jackie
- Theresa Wood as Sally
- Steve Amber as Bryan
- Julia Bond as Samantha Worthington
- Caroline Funnell as Judith
- Chris Gannon as Mr. Palmer
- David Rayner as Francis
- David Rodigan as Jose
- Jeanne Starbuck as Mrs. O'Flaherty
- Vicky Hamilton-King as Mrs. Barnes
- Jason White as Australian Lover

== Production ==
During the making of the film, Grant got into a furious row with Johnny Briggs, after Briggs refused to bare all for the film. Briggs feared such exposure could damage his reputation, and a furious Grant threatened to fire him. After the intervention of Briggs’ agent, a compromise was reached and Briggs performed the offending scene with his underpants on. Briggs later recalled this story in his autobiography, noting that after the film he vowed never to work with Grant again.

== Critical reception ==
The Monthly Film Bulletin wrote: "Apart from an authentic location in the freshly painted offices of the production company, Oppidan Films, this bland home movie offers nothing to titillate patriotic patrons but an underdeveloped assortment of keen but wilfully unerotic Home County girls. The saucy partygoers gawp at an unseen pornographic movie, and Judy, the office dumpling who has been left out of the fun, asks incredulously: 'How can actors act in them?' "
