= Steve Veidor =

British professional wrestler (born 1935)

Personal information
- Born: Steve Bell; 10 January 1935 (age 91) Ellesmere Port, Cheshire, England

Professional wrestling career
- Ring name(s): Steve Veidor; Hermann Veidor; Kurtz Kurtz Veidor; Steve Bell
- Billed height: 6 ft 1.5 in (1.87 m)
- Billed weight: 220 lb (100 kg; 16 st)
- Debut: 1960s
- Retired: 1970s

Steve Bell (born 10 January 1935), better known by the ring name Steve Veidor, is a former British heavyweight professional wrestler of the 1960s and 1970s, usually billed as The Handsome Heart Throb.

== Career ==
Bell was born in Ellesmere Port, a port in Cheshire, England. After service as a corporal in the Royal Air Force as a Physical Training Instructor, Veidor took up amateur wrestling. After turning professional, he initially wrestled as Hermann Veidor and Steve Bell. He won the Royal Albert Hall Tournament Trophy on three occasions. On 15 September 1978 Veidor won the European Heavyweight Championship at Liverpool, Great Britain.

Veidor made many appearances on ITV's World of Sport, and has wrestled across Europe, worked in films, television game shows and commercials. He appeared alongside other wrestlers in the 1968 cult film The Touchables, directed by Robert Freeman, and as Muscles in Derek Ford's 1973 film Keep It Up, Jack.

Between the months of February and March 1975, Veidor toured New Japan Pro-Wrestling, taking on such Japanese professional wrestling legends Antonio Inoki, Seiji Sakaguchi and Strong Kobayashi.

== Championships and accomplishments ==
- Royal Albert Hall Tournament Trophy (3 times)
