= David Grant (producer) =

British pornography producer

David Hamilton Grant (born Willis Andrew Holt; 1939–1991) was an English porn producer during the late 1960s and 1970s.

== Biography ==
Willis Andrew Holt was born in Uxbridge in 1939. He changed his name by deed poll on the 22 January 1982 to David Hamilton Grant.

Grant's first film was Love Variations (1969), a sex education film that was based on a 'marriage manual' Grant had photographed/published a year earlier. Grant's sex film empire grew in the 1970s; he opened up a number of adult cinemas, the first being The Pigalle in 1974, distributed foreign sex films through his Oppidan company, and produced his own featurette length British sex comedies (Girls Come First, The Office Party, and Under the Bed). He also produced Snow White and the Seven Perverts (1973), a pornographic animated short parodying "Snow White and the Seven Dwarfs".

Grant's featurettes were often released on the lower half of cinema double-bills with popular European sex films in order to capitalise on the Eady Levy tax situation. For example, Girls Come First was paired on a 1975 double bill with Enter The 7 Virgins, the Grant produced The Over-Amorous Artist was retitled Just One More Time and re-released as the support feature to a 1975 release of Just Jaeckin's Emmanuelle (1974), The Office Party was paired on a 1976 double bill with Linda Lovelace for President, and the Grant directed Sensations starring Cosey Fanni Tutti and Genesis P-Orridge was the support feature to Le Sexe qui parle (1975). Described in a 1978 profile in Punch magazine as "a chubby, boyish forty-year-old, with a youthful, uncorrupted face enfolded in two glossy skull-caps of hair and beard", Grant liked to refer to himself as the "King of Sexploitation", and enjoyed giving himself Hitchcock-like cameos in his own films.

During the making of The Office Party (1976), Grant got into a row with actor Johnny Briggs, after Briggs refused to bare all for the film. Briggs feared such exposure could damage his reputation, and a furious Grant threatened to fire him. After the intervention of Briggs' agent, a compromise was reached and Briggs performed the offending scene with his underpants on. Briggs later recalled this story in his autobiography, noting that after the film he vowed never to work with Grant again. As well as his sex films, Grant also produced X-rated cartoons like Sinderella (1972), and comedy shorts like Escape to Entebbe' (1976), a parody of Idi Amin featuring a browned up John Bluthal as a Pakistani TV reporter.

In the early eighties, Grant turned to video, forming the World of Video 2000 label with fellow 1970s sex film mogul Malcolm Fancey. Grant held the position of company secretary, while Fancey was head of marketing. The company launched onto the video market with several soft porn titles in December 1981. In 1983 Grant noted that Steven Spielberg's film E.T. the Extra-Terrestrial had yet to be released on home video in the UK, and responded by releasing an old sixties B movie called Night Fright (1968) on video under the title E.T.N - The Extra Terrestrial Nastie, with video artwork that parodied the E.T. poster. Universal International Pictures threatened legal action, and the tape was withdrawn then later re-released with different artwork.

On 3 February 1984, Grant was imprisoned for distributing "video nasty" Nightmares in a Damaged Brain (1981) on video. Grant was sentenced to 6 months in prison for being in "possession of over 200 copies of an obscene article for publication for gain", he was found guilty under section two of the obscene publications act. Grant's defense lawyer during the trial was Geoffrey Robertson. After Grant's imprisonment, World of Video 2000 (and its parent company April Electronics) were placed into liquidation.

The Slough Observer alleged that Grant had been a drug dealer, and had "corrupted thousands of children" during his time in Northern Cyprus.

An article in The Independent claims that Grant is "thought to have been the victim of a contract killing in 1991," though no evidence is provided to substantiate this rumor. Damaged, a 2023 documentary about Grant, floats the theory that he is still alive.

== Filmography ==
Year	Title	Role	Notes
1969	Love Variations	Director (as Terry Gould)	
1970	Sex, Love and Marriage	Director (as Terry Gould)	
1972	Sinderella	Co-producer, writer	
1972	Au Pair Girls	Story	
1973	Snow White and the Seven Perverts	Co-producer, writer	
1973	Secrets of a Door-to-Door Salesman	Producer	
1974	The Over-Amorous Artist	Producer	Re-released in 1975 as Just One More Time
1974	The Great McGonagall	Producer	
1975	Pink Orgasm		Uncompleted, footage later edited into Who Bears Sins
1975	Girls Come First	Co-producer	
1976	Dear Marjorie Boobs	Producer	
1976	The Office Party	Director, producer, writer	
1976	Escape to Entebbe	Co-director, producer	
1977	Under the Bed	Director, co-producer	
1977	Submission	Director	
1977	Over Exposed		Footage later edited into Who Bears Sins
1977	The Kiss	Co-producer	
1977	Marcia	Co-director, script	
1978	End of Term	Producer	
1978	You're Driving Me Crazy	Co-writer, director	
1978	Love is Beautiful		Unfilmed
1979	The London Programme	Interviewee	TV
1980	Electric Blue 001	None	Video, includes Snow White and the Seven Perverts
1987	Who Bears Sins	Director	Video compilation

== Films distributed by Grant ==
Titles marked "rejected" were refused classification by the British censor and therefore banned. Dates refer to the year of distribution, rather than the film's actual production dates.

Year	Title	Notes
1972	Easy Virtue	Rejected
1973	Succubus	
1973	The Apprentice	Rejected
1974	Wet Dreams	Rejected
1974	Confessions of a Sex Maniac	
1974	A Man of Our Time	
1974	The Last House on the Left	Rejected
1974	The Growling Tiger	Rejected
1975	Best of the New York Film Festival	Rejected
1975	Woman's Best Friend	Rejected
1975	Ilsa, She Wolf of the SS	Rejected
1975	Take an Easy Ride	
1975	Far Gone- Too Far Gone	
1975	Crimson Acceleration	
1975	Submission (also known as Pets)	
1975	The Bruce Lee Story	
1975	The No Mercy Man	
1976	My X Wife	Rejected
1976	The Coming of Seymour	Rejected
1976	The Best Way to Walk	
1976	Late Night Trains	Rejected
1976	The Younger the Better	
1976	Divine Obsession	
1976	Only in Denmark	
1976	Depraved	
1976	Exhibition	Rejected
1976	Linda Lovelace for President	
1977	Cathy's Curse	
1977	What a Performer	
1977	Dreams of Thirteen	
1977	Sensations	
1977	Draws	
1977	Through the Looking Glass	
1977	Private Collection	
1977	Good Taste	
1977	Desperate Living	Rejected
1977	Pelvis (also known as Hard Up)	
1977	Pussy Talk	Rejected
1978	His Model Wife	Rejected
1978	The Young Tycoon	
1978	Memories Within Miss Aggie	
1978	Dark Star	
1978	Days in London	
1978	Soft Places	
1978	Shock Waves	
1978	Lebanon Why?	
1979	Take Off	
1979	Feel My Love	
1979	Big Ones	
1980	Video Blue a.k.a. The Double Exposure of Holly	
1982	Nightmares in a Damaged Brain	
