= The House That Vanished =

1973 British film by José Ramón Larraz

- American theatrical poster
- Directed by: José Ramón Larraz
- Screenplay by: Derek Ford
- Produced by: Diana Daubeney
- Starring: Andrea Allan: Karl Lanchbury; Judy Matheson
- Cinematography: Trevor Wren
- Edited by: Derek Ford
- Music by: Terry Warr
- Production company: Blackwater Film Productions
- Distributed by: Variety Film Distributors (United Kingdom): American International Pictures (United States)
- Release date: 25 November 1973 (United Kingdom)
- Running time: 99 minutes (original cut): 84 minutes (US theatrical cut)
- Country: United Kingdom
- Language: English

The House That Vanished (also released under the titles Scream – and Die! and Please! Don't Go in the Bedroom) is a 1973 British exploitation horror film directed by José Ramón Larraz, written by Derek Ford, and starring Andrea Allan, Karl Lanchbury and Judy Matheson. Its plot follows a young fashion model who witnesses a murder in an abandoned house in the woods, but is unable to relocate it after reporting the crime to police.

== Plot ==
London fashion model Valerie Jennings travels into the countryside with her photographer boyfriend, Terry, who is searching for an abandoned house; he intends to find something there, but does not tell her what it is. They discover the house at nightfall, and while exploring it, Valerie discovers numerous women's passports in a bedroom. Another couple—a woman and an unseen man—enter the house. Panicked, Valerie and Terry hide in a closet. They watch as the woman is brutally murdered with a switchblade. While the killer washes his hands in the bathroom, Valerie flees, unaware that Terry is not following behind her. When she finds the keys to their car missing, she runs into the woods, and the killer chases her into an abandoned wrecking yard where she manages to evade him by hiding inside a car.

The next day, Valerie reaches a road and hitchhikes back to London. She enters her apartment, and while standing at the kitchen window, sees Terry's car parked on the street. She finds it unlocked and, inside, discovers her modeling portfolio with a photo missing. Perplexed, she goes to Terry's apartment but finds he has not returned home. Panicked, Valerie visits her friend Mike and his girlfriend, Stella, who urge her not to go to the police, fearing she will implicate herself in Terry's burglary. Later, at a modeling shoot, Mike introduces Valerie to his friend Paul, a young and shy artist who makes masks for a living. Paul invites Valerie over for dinner, but they are joined by his domineering Aunt Susanna. After Valerie leaves, Paul and Susanna have incestuous sex.

Still concerned over Terry's absence, Valerie agrees to bring Mike and Stella to the house. She leads them to the wrecking yard, where they inexplicably find Terry's ravaged car. Despite their efforts, they are unable to find the house. Back in her apartment building, Valerie becomes unnerved by the presence of Mr. Hornby, an eccentric new neighbor who moves in below her, and who keeps pigeons in his home. She is relieved when her flatmate Lorna, also a model, returns from an out-of-town job. One night, while Valerie is out with friends, an intruder breaks into the apartment and murders Lorna after raping her.

Unsettled by Lorna's murder, Valerie is invited to go out of town with Paul, to which she agrees. He takes her to a remote manor house owned by his family. While there, he confesses to her that his father committed suicide in the home. At night, Valerie hears noises coming from upstairs, but Paul assures her no one is there. She goes to investigate and notices a taxidermied animal identical to one she saw in the house she entered with Terry; she realizes she is in the same house as before. In the bedroom upstairs, she discovers a blood-stained bed. Hearing someone come up the stairs, she again hides in the closet and sees Susanna enter the room, calling for Paul and chastising him. In the closet, she discovers the bodies of Terry and the first victim. Valerie flees downstairs, where she is attacked by Paul. Susanna encourages him to kill Valerie, but he turns on her, stabbing her to death. Valerie runs outside, where she is met by the police. Inside, Paul sits in the hallway in silence.

== Cast ==
- Andrea Allan as Valerie Jennings
- Karl Lanchbury as Paul
- Maggie Walker as Aunt Susanna
- Peter Forbes-Robertson as Mr. Hornby
- Judy Matheson as Lorna Collins
- Annabella Wood as Stella
- Alex Leppard as Terry
- Lawrence Keane as Mike
- Edmund Pegge as Kent
- Daphne Lea as Mrs. Dabney
- Richard Aylen as Inspector Matheson
- Barbara Meale as 1st Victim
- Joshua Leppard as Peter
- Raymond Young as Car Driver

== Production ==
=== Filming ===
Made by the British company Blackwater Film Productions and produced by Diana Daubeney (the director's wife), the film was shot on location in London, Essex and Hertfordshire, England.

=== Music ===
The music was scored by Terry Warr. The classical piece "Für Elise" is featured during the end credits.

== Release ==
=== Promotion and original release ===
The film was released in the United Kingdom under the Scream – and Die! on 25 November 1973 as support feature to the American film Bonnie's Kids.

In the United States, it was given an exclusive first-run screening under the title Please! Don't Go in the Bedroom at the Trail Drive-In in Lake Worth, Florida, on 7 December 1973. It received theatrical distribution in the United States beginning in October 1974 through American International Pictures, who retitled the film The House That Vanished. This cut of the film runs 84 minutes; according to film scholar Gary Smith, the original cut of the film (under the Scream – and Die! title) ran 99 minutes. To capitalise on the recent popularity of Wes Craven's Last House on the Left (1972), the poster used that film's popular tagline, "It's Only a Movie," which suggested a graphic exploitation film.

The film was re-released in 1977 under the titles Psycho Sex Fiend and Psycho Sex.

=== Home media ===
The film was released on VHS in 1984, under the title The House That Vanished, by Media Home Entertainment. In 1988, Video Treasures reissued the film on VHS under the same title. These VHS releases list a running time of 84 minutes, the same as the theatrical cut of the film released by American International Pictures. The film was also released on Blu-ray but quickly went out of print.

== Sources ==
- Cooper, Ian (2016). Frightmares: A History of British Horror Cinema. New York: Columbia University Press. ISBN 978-0-993-07174-4.
- Craddock, James M. (2008). Video Source Book (39th ed.). Thomson Gale. ISBN 978-1-414-40100-3.
- Fenton, Harvey; Flint, David (2001). Ten Years of Terror: British Horror Films of the 1970s. FAB Press. ISBN 978-1-903-25408-0.
- Meyers, Ric (2011). For One Week Only: The World of Exploitation Films (Revised ed.). Eirini Press. ISBN 978-0-979-99893-5.
- Smith, Gary A. (2006). Uneasy Dreams: The Golden Age of British Horror Films, 1956-1976. Jefferson, N. Carolina: McFarland & Company. ISBN 978-0-786-42661-4.
