= Albion Market =

British television soap opera (1985–1986)

- Genre: Soap opera
- Written by: Andy Lynch; Stephen Lowe; Kay Mellor; Martin Riley
- Directed by: Gareth Jones; Ric Mellis
- Starring: David Hargreaves; Derek Hicks; Noreen Kershaw; Jonathan Barlow; Bernard Spear; Carol Kaye; Geoffrey Leesley; John Michie; Valerie Lilley; Peter Benson
- Country of origin: United Kingdom
- Original language: English
- No. of seasons: 1
- No. of episodes: 100

Production
- Executive producer: Bill Podmore
- Producers: David Liddiment; Gareth Jones
- Production location: United Kingdom
- Running time: 30 minutes
- Production company: Granada Television

Original release
- Network: ITV
- Release: 30 August 1985 – 24 August 1986

Albion Market was a British soap opera, set in a covered market in Salford, in the north-west of England. It was intended as a companion to fellow ITV soap Coronation Street, filmed in colour, starting at 7:00 pm on Fridays and 7:15 pm on Sundays. Owing to continued troubles and ratings competition from the BBC's Open All Hours, though, the series was broadcast for only one year; a Friday episode of Coronation Street was introduced in October 1989.

== History ==
Albion Market launched in August 1985, four months before Coronation Street celebrated its 25th anniversary. As with Coronation Street, Granada Studios dubbed it a "continuing drama series", considering the term "soap opera" to be derogatory. The show ran twice weekly on Friday and Sunday nights: at the time, 7:00 pm on Fridays and 7:15 pm on Sundays were considered "graveyard slots", usually broadcasting game shows (although these were often very popular) or American imports. Very quickly, the Sunday episodes were moved back to around 6:00 pm, while LWT and TVS, which felt that ITV's network schedules had too much of a Northern bias, later dropped the Friday episode and instead broadcast a double bill of the series at 5:00 pm on Sundays. At the series' launch, the chairman of Granada Television claimed, "When Coronation Street celebrates its golden anniversary, Albion Market will be celebrating its silver anniversary". Despite this, the show lasted for only one year.

The show received negative reviews from critics and did not do well in the ratings. Many noted that the actual storyline rarely strayed from the confines of the market itself. The long-suffering market superintendent, Derek Owen (David Hargeaves), was the primary focus; his day usually began with the difficult task of assigning the few unowned stalls to the large number of casual traders. Prominent among these were Lynne Harrison (Noreen Kershaw) and her ex-convict husband Roy (Jonathan Barlow); regular traders included the gossiping ceramics dealer, Morris Ransome (Bernard Spear), and handsome lothario and cake seller Tony Fraser (John Michie).

The series struggled to attract a sizeable audience. Characters were bogged down by the business of running their stalls, and the sheer drabness of the set compounded the monotony. After this faltering start, compounded by Michael Grade's success with his newly rearranged schedules for the BBC, Granada attempted to change direction and bring in both glamour and familiar actors. Despite attempts to encourage viewing figures by bringing in Till Death Us Do Part actor Antony Booth and singer Helen Shapiro, the ratings did not improve and some ITV regions dropped the series from their peak-time schedules. The show was cancelled after just 100 episodes. For many years, the outdoor location with its distinctive arch-shaped "Albion Market" sign above the River Irwell remained intact. When the Granada Tours Experience was closed in 1999, the sign was removed and the building that was once Albion Market was sold. It now forms part of the Victoria and Albert Hotel.

== Cast ==
- David Hargreaves as Derek Owen, market superintendent
- Derek Hicks as Keith Naylor, superintendent's assistant
- Noreen Kershaw as Lynne Harrison, stallholder
- Jonathan Barlow as Roy Harrison, stallholder
- Sally Baxter as Lisa O'Shea, stallholder
- Bernard Spear as Morris Ransome, stallholder
- Carol Kaye as Miriam Ransome, stallholder
- Geoffrey Leesley as Geoff Travis, stallholder
- Barbara Pierson as Eileen Travis
- John Michie as Tony Fraser, stallholder
- Valerie Lilley as Brenda Rigg, stallholder
- Peter Benson as Larry Rigg, stallholder
- Alistair Walker as Duane Rigg, Brenda and Larry's son
- Paul Bhattacharjee as Jaz Sharma, stallholder
- Dev Sagoo as Raju Sharma, stallholder
- Pik-Sen Lim as Ly Nhu Chan, stallholder
- Philip Tan as Lam Quoc Hoa, stallholder
- Linda Polan as Maureen Nicholls, stallholder
- Liam Flannery as Billy Nicholls, stallholder
- Howard Lloyd-Lewis as Ralph Jessup, Maureen and Billy's uncle
- Barbara Wilshere as Carol Broadbent, cafe assistant
- Burt Caesar as Phil Smith, chef
- Paula Jacobs as Peggy Sagar, cafe manager
- Malcolm Hebden as Oliver Shawcross, stallholder
- Helen Shapiro as Viv Harker
- Jane Hazlegrove as Debbie Taylor
- Nimmy March as Collette Johnson
- Avis Bunnage as Annie Naylor
- Lill Roughley as Barbara Owen
- Kelly Lawrence as Louise Todd
- Arthur Kelly as Dermot Thornburgh
- Antony Booth as Ted Pilkington
- Simon Rouse as Alan Curtis
- Souad Faress as Anita Rai
- Seeta Indrani as Sita Sharma
- Jamila Massey as Susha Sharma
- Rebecca Lock as Jenny McMullen
- David Phelan as Sean Ellison
- Paul Beringer as Paul O'Donnell
- Marie Jelliman as Mary Houlihan
- Andy Rashleigh as Colin Arnold
- Henry Moxon as Simon Walker
- Duane Mills as Gregory Dickson
- Martin Oldfield as Howard Dickinson
- David Boyce as Ralph Friend
- Hetta Charnley as Janet Owen
- Rashid Karapiet as Narya Vyas
- Jane Karen as Carrie Mullen

== Episodes ==
No.	Title	Directed by	Written by	British air date
1	"Episode 1"	Gareth Jones	Peter Whalley	30 August 1985
Market superintendent Derek Owen's day does not get off to a good start when he is forced to evacuate the market following a telephone threat. Proceedings are eventually returned to normal, until an arson attack on an unoccupied stall results in a further evacuation. Meanwhile, Lynne Harrison is excited at the prospect of her husband's release from jail, but her daughter is not so pleased. Derek's assistant Keith is also excited about taking his motorcycle test.
2	"Episode 2"	Gareth Jones	Andrew Lynch	1 September 1985
Derek continues his investigation into the arson attack and suspects that one of the Jessop family may have sabotaged their own stall. Later, further telephone threats to the market are made, leading to Derek interrogating Ralph Jessop. Meanwhile, Lynne's husband Roy is finally released from prison, and Geoff and Morris' dispute over the sale of pot plants threatens to reach boiling point. Keith finally passes his motorcycle test, but is upset when his bike is stolen.
3	"Episode 3"	Jonathan Wright Miller	Peter Whalley	6 September 1985
Tony Fraser makes a welcome return from his travels, immediately setting his eye on both Lisa O'Shea and Carol Broadbent. Meanwhile, a charity fun run to raise money for the local hospital unexpectedly results in the discovery of the identity of the market arsonist. Roy Harrison befriends Larry Rigg, who offers to show him the tricks of the trade. Morris decides to up the stakes in his feud with Geoff by starting to sell pot plants, much to Geoff's anger.
4	"Episode 4"	Jonathan Wright Miller	Andrew Lynch	8 September 1985
Roy stalls Lynne's chances of a permanent stall on the market after trying to bribe Derek. Tony's seduction attempts fall flat when Lisa and Carol discover their "holiday: presents were actually bought from Brenda's stall, and concoct a plan to show him the error of his ways. Geoff tries to con Morris with a story involving "root rot", but Morris is having none of it and refuses to back down. Larry offers to import a shipment of goods on Roy's behalf.
5	"Episode 5"	Brian Lighthill	Peter Whalley	13 September 1985
Derek makes a decision over the Jessops' future on the market after further trouble, offering their stall to the Sharma brothers, who are desperate for a regular tenancy. Morris and Geoff agree to let bygones be bygones, but soon find themselves at loggerheads once more. Roy begins to embrace working on the market by selling a batch of expensive watches, but Lynne suspects they may be stolen and does a little digging. Tony continues to woo the ladies.
