= Andrea Allan =

Scottish actress

- Born: 18 November 1946 (age 79); Glasgow, Scotland, UK
- Other name: Ellie Reece-Knight
- Occupation: Actress
- Years active: 1964–1977

Andrea Allan (born 18 November 1946) is a Scottish-born actress who appeared in many British films of the 1960s and 1970s. She also appeared in magazine spreads for both Playboy and Penthouse.

Her films included Carry On Cowboy, The Wrong Box with Dudley Moore, Vampira with David Niven, Spanish Fly with Leslie Phillips and The Office Party. She had the leading role in The House That Vanished and appeared in several television series including Gideon's Way, UFO (episodes "A Question of Priorities", "The Sound of Silence" and "The Man Who Came Back"), Space: 1999, Thriller and Jason King.

In the mid-1970s she changed her name to Ellie Reece-Knight and appeared in a few more films and an episode of The Benny Hill Show before apparently retiring from acting on screen.

== Selected filmography ==
- Carry On Cowboy (1965)
- The Wrong Box (1966)
- Assignment K (1968)
- She'll Follow You Anywhere (1971)
- The House That Vanished (a.k.a. Scream – and Die!) (1973)
- Vampira (1974)
- Spanish Fly (1975)
- The Office Party (1976) (credited as Ellie Reece-Knight)
