= The Sleep of Death =

Sleep of Death
- "You Won't Believe Your Eyes"
- Directed by: Calvin Floyd
- Written by: Calvin Floyd; Yvonne Floyd based on a story by Sheridan Le Fanu
- Produced by: Reidun Stenbeck
- Starring: Curd Jürgens; Per Oscarsson; Patrick Magee; Marilù Tolo
- Music by: Ragnar Grippe
- Distributed by: Dragon Co. Aspect Film
- Release date: 1980

Sleep of Death (a.k.a. The Inn of the Flying Dragon or The Sleep of Death) is a 1980 Swedish-Irish historical horror film written and directed by Calvin Floyd and starring Per Oscarsson, Curd Jürgens, Patrick Magee and Marilù Tolo.The film was shot in 1977. It is based on the 1872 novella The Room in the Dragon Volant by Sheridan Le Fanu. The film's Swedish title is Ondskans Värdshus. It was released in Sweden in 1981.

== Plot ==
In 1815 at the end of the Napoleonic Wars, a young Englishman travels to France in pursuit of a woman, the Countess St. Alyre. Once there he meets some weird characters, including the Marquis D'Armanville, and he begins to experience otherworldly events as a series of murders occur.

== Cast ==
- Per Oscarsson ... Colonel Gaillard
- Patrick Magee ... Marquis
- Curd Jürgens ... Count St. Alyre
- Marilù Tolo ... Countess Elga
- Brendan Price ... Robert Terence
- Niall Toibin ... Sean
- Kay Maclaren ... Old Woman
- Barry Cassins ... The Count's Brother
- Christopher Casson ... Sir Philip Terence
- John Molloy ... Priest
- Ray McAnally ... Inspector Carmingac
- Archie O'Sullivan ... Chemist
- Bill Foley ... Colonel's Orderly
- Jacinta Martín ... First Maid
- Olwen Fouere ... Second Maid
