= Ray Barron =

British actor (1940–2016)

- Born: Raynor Alan Francis Barrow; 1 November 1940; Watford, Hertfordshire, England
- Died: 13 February 2016 (aged 75); Eastbourne, Sussex, England
- Occupation: Actor

Raynor Alan Francis Barrow (1 November 1940 – 13 February 2016) was a British actor. He typically played minor roles such as policemen or workmen.

Barron was expelled from drama school because they felt he lacked "potential" to become an actor. However, he did not let this get him down. Meeting with Ken Loach, Barron's career was launched when the director cast him alongside Carol White in two editions of The Wednesday Play in 1965 (Up the Junction and The Coming of Age Party) followed by the 1967 film Poor Cow.

Other films work included 10 Rillington Place (1971) in which he played a workman, She'll Follow You Anywhere (1971) and Cry Uncle! (1971). On TV, he appeared in Doctor Who as Sergeant Henderson in parts five and six of the 1976 serial The Seeds of Doom, and in 1981 played a seaman in the series The Incredible Mr Tanner.

In 2008, Ray was the special guest at a 43tv Retro TV Sweeney Meet in Hammersmith, London. Ray gave an after dinner talk about his career in television and film, and in particular his part in The Sweeney.

== Filmography ==
| Year | Title | Role | Notes |
|---|---|---|---|
| 1967 | Poor Cow | Customer in Pub | |
| 1971 | Venom | Young Man | |
| 1971 | She'll Follow You Anywhere | Groom | |
| 1971 | 10 Rillington Place | Workman Willis | |
| 1971 | Cry Uncle! | Bald Cop | |
| 1987 | The Second Victory | Sgt. Willis | (final film role) |
