= Derek Hicks =

English actor

- Born: England, UK
- Occupation: Actor
- Years active: 1985–present

Derek Hicks is an English actor whose career has spanned over thirty years. He has appeared in several British television series and theatre productions.

He appeared as the Superindendent's Assistant Keith Naylor in Albion Market, between 1985 and 1986.

His next role was as tee-total vet Willie Bannister in the 1988 All Creatures Great and Small episode "The Salt of the Earth". He reprised the role the following year in "Blood and Water".

Hicks appeared as Sean Roach in Brookside from 1989 to 1990. "I joined Brookside as a recurring character, but then I went back to All Creatures for "Blood and Water", then I did some more Brookside. This character was completely different to Willie Bannister. I came in as someone's son who had been serving in Northern Ireland and had got shell shocked, had beaten up someone and gone AWOL! It was just weird to go from one to the other, two completely different characters."

Between 1991 and 2013, he appeared in eighteen different series. His most recent role was as Palmer in the short series The Going Rate.

Hicks is also a drama coach for the British theatre arts school Stagecoach.
