= Brendan Price =

British actor (born 1947)

- Born: Brendan Thimothy Price; 24 June 1947 (age 79); Coventry, Warwickshire; United Kingdom
- Occupations: film actor television actor
- Years active: 1972–present

Brendan Price (born 24 June 1947) is a British theatre, film and television actor. He graduated, winning the prize for outstanding dialect work and began his career in the regional theatres of England. He worked in a number of the major theatres, playing a diverse range of parts in the plays of Anton Chekhov, William Shakespeare, Arthur Miller, and in those of many other writers, both classical and modern.

== Early life ==
Taught at the King Henry VIII School, Coventry, Price was expected to follow in his father's footsteps by working for British Leyland. However, he got his first taste of acting, appearing in junior school productions as Prince Charming in Cinderella followed by Abanazar in Aladdin. Eventually, he became one of the school's leading actors, appearing in productions of The Prodigious Snob and as Badger in Toad of Toad Hall. This led to Price appearing in amateur productions for the Talisman Theatre in Kenilworth and Massey Ferguson Theatre group, notably playing the lead in Billy Liar for both. With the latter, he directed a production of A Taste of Honey and soon won a place at the Royal Academy of Dramatic Art (RADA), becoming professional afterwards.

== Television ==
His television career began in 1972 with a part in the BBC's Play of the Month series in James Joyce's Stephen Dedalus.

For the next few years, his work moved freely between television and theatre until he made his first film, a starring role in the sex comedy Secrets of a Door-to-Door Salesman (1973), which was due to be directed by a young Jonathan Demme, but Demme was dismissed from the project. Price offered to resign his role in sympathy with him, but Demme counselled him to stay with the part, imparting the advice, "In this business these things happen."

Price benefited from this lesson; his TV credits are numerous, and he has played guest roles in many major British television series including Doctor Who (in the serial The Face of Evil), Space: 1999 and The Sweeney. He played the role of Det. Sgt. Frank Bonney in the BBC’s internationally sold series Target. Back on stage, he played the title role of The Gambling Man in an adaptation of Catherine Cookson's novel. Miss Cookson said in her autobiography, "He was my perfect Gambling Man!".

At this time, he starred in yet another film comedy that featured the cream of British comedy talent, The Amorous Milkman (1975). Back on stage, he played one of the leads in the World Premiere of Woundings at the Royal Exchange Theatre, Manchester, and a memorable Biff in Arthur Miller's Death of a Salesman with Ray McAnally.

== Spain ==
His career took another turn when he moved to live in Spain to set up a business selling advertising display photographs to shops. In order to do so, he needed to learn Spanish and so attended a language school in Barcelona, where he met his future wife Terri. However, the business was hit by the recession when people cut back on advertising. Price returned to Britain when he was cast in the role of the heartthrob Dr Bernard McAllister in the long-running series Emmerdale from 1993 to 1995.

This opened up a new market for his talents, which were quickly seen in the Spanish series Calle Nueva. He followed this with other guest roles, and he had a major part in the award-winning film Los Sin Nombre released in the US as The Nameless directed by Jaume Balagueró. He was also in Dagon directed by Stuart Gordon, The Nun and The Sleep of Death, an adaptation of the Japanese novel by Eloy Lozano.

He featured in the Catalan film Excuses! directed by Joel Joan. Over the past few years, he has guest-starred in the Spanish series Anti-vicio, El Comisario, and he had a regular part in the very popular series Los Hombres de Paco. He also featured in the mini-series Alakrana in 2010. On the big screen, he was in The Possession of Emma Evans, and he played opposite to Carme Elias in the award-winning Planes para Mañana. In Roberto Santiago’s film El Sueño de Iván ("Ivan's Dream"), released in 2011, he played Greg Cullen, the President of FIFA.

At the end of 2010, he co-starred with Michael Ironside in "Transgression", which was released in 2011. That same year, he worked on the well-known Spanish series "Amar en Tiempos Revueltos" ("To Love Is Forever").

== Selected filmography ==
- Secrets of a Door-to-Door Salesman (1973)
- The Amorous Milkman (1975)
- The Sleep of Death (1980)
- The Nameless (1999)
- Dagon (2001)
- Savage Grace (2007)
- Brain Drain (2009)
- Exorcismus (2010)

== Television appearances ==
- Man at the Top
- The Sweeney
- Target
- Doctor Who (The Face of Evil)
- Space: 1999 ("Catacombs of the Moon")
- The Chinese Puzzle
- Robin of Sherwood
- Emmerdale
