= Bernard Spear =

English actor (1919–2003)

- Born: 11 September 1919; Croydon, Surrey, England
- Died: 9 May 2003 (aged 83); Sutton, London, England
- Occupation: Actor
- Years active: 1956–2003
- Spouse: Mary Newton (m. 1949)
- Children: 1

Bernard Spear (11 September 1919 – 9 May 2003) was an English actor.

== Early life ==
Spear was born on 11 September 1919 in Croydon, Surrey, to a Polish-Jewish father and a Russian-Jewish mother. He was educated at Central Federation School in London, and worked as a clerk at a tobacco manufacturers before serving in the Royal Artillery in Gibraltar during World War II.

== Career ==
Spear starred in the BAFTA TV Award-winning television play Bar Mitzvah Boy, and also portrayed the dual roles of Cervantes's manservant and Sancho Panza in the 1968 London stage version of Man of La Mancha. His film career includes roles in the films Drop Dead Darling (1966), Bedazzled (1967), Chitty Chitty Bang Bang (1968), The Adventures of Barry McKenzie (1972), Secrets of a Door-to-Door Salesman (1972), Wombling Free (1977) and Yentl (1983). His only regular role on television was as Morris Ransome in the soap opera Albion Market (1985–86).

== Personal life ==
Spear married dancer/writer Mary Newton (previously Logan) in 1949; the couple had one child, Julian, owner of Julian Spear PR (an independent music promotion company for radio and television), who was married to actress Carol Royle.

Bernard and Mary remained married until his death in 2003.

== Filmography ==
| Year | Title | Role | Notes |
|---|---|---|---|
| 1959 | Quatermass and the Pit | News Vendor/Arthur | Miniseries |
| 1966 | Daleks' Invasion Earth 2150 A.D. | Man with Carrier Bag | |
| 1966 | Drop Dead Darling | French Inspector | |
| 1967 | Bedazzled | Irving Moses | |
| 1968 | Chitty Chitty Bang Bang | Goran the Spy | |
| 1972 | The Adventures of Barry McKenzie | Cabbie | |
| 1972 | Hide and Seek | Fruit Vendor | |
| 1973 | Secrets of a Door-to-Door Salesman | Jake Tripper | |
| 1974 | Love Thy Neighbour | Alfredo | Episode: The Mediterranean |
| 1976 | Bar Mitzvah Boy | Victor Green | TV Movie |
| 1977 | Gulliver's Travels | | Voice |
| 1977 | Wombling Free | Arnold Takahashi | |
| 1983 | Yentl | Tailor | |
| 1985 | Not Quite Paradise | Mr. Schwartz | |
| 1994 | Lovejoy | Morrie Samuels | Episode: Fruit of the Desert |
| 2000 | The Man Who Cried | Man in Sweatshop | |
