= Valerie Lilley =

Irish actress (born 1939)

- Born: 14 April 1939 (age 87); Larne, County Antrim, Northern Ireland
- Occupation: Actress
- Years active: 1973–present
- Notable work: Shameless

Valerie Lilley (born 14 April 1939) is a Northern Irish actress who has played many television roles on dramas such as Doctors and Grange Hill. Lilley most recently appeared in BBC1's Casualty as Daisy Fennings. Prior to that, she starred in Channel 4's comedy drama Shameless portraying Patty Croker (2010–2012). She also appeared briefly in a stretch on the Catherine Tate Show

Lilley trained with Joan Littlewood's Arts Workshop in London during the early sixties and received an early boost, which included appearing alongside Stephen Rea. She spent many years as a stage actress throughout the UK. In 1982, she took a minor role in another local television play, Stewart Parker's Iris in the Traffic, Ruby in the Rain, starring Frances Tomelty. Also in 1982, Lilley appeared in two other televised plays, Potato Head Blues and the troubles rooted Billy Boy with James Ellis. Lilley was also a regular in ITV's ill-fated Albion Market.

She was born in Larne in 1939, the daughter of James and Margaret Lilley and lived at Oakdene, Inver, attending St. Mary's Primary School and then St. Dominic's High School in Belfast, before the family relocated to Ramsbottom, Greater Manchester in England.
