= Just One More Time =

1974 British film by Maurice Hamblin

The Over-Amorous Artist
- Frame from the film
- Directed by: Maurice Hamblin
- Screenplay by: Peter Horrey
- Produced by: David Grant
- Starring: John Hamill; Sue Longhurst; Hilary Pritchard
- Cinematography: Geoffrey Glover
- Edited by: Ian Duncan
- Music by: John Shakespeare
- Production company: Oppidan Film Productions
- Release date: 1974
- Running time: 46 minutes
- Country: United Kingdom
- Language: English

The Over-Amorous Artist, re-released in 1975 as Just One More Time, is a 1974 British sex comedy short film, directed by Maurice Hamblin and starring John Hamill, Sue Longhurst and Hilary Pritchard. It was followed by two sequels, Girls Come First (1975) and Under the Bed (1977), which also starred Hamill in the role of Alan Street.

== Plot ==
While his beautiful wife Sue is at work, Alan Street, a budding portrait artist, has to fend off the advances of his sex crazed female neighbours, including Bev, a middle-aged nymphomaniac, Carole, a hippie girl, and married woman Fran and her daughter Barbara, Alan and Sue's babysitter.

== Cast ==
- John Hamill as Alan Street
- Sue Longhurst as Sue Street
- John Bluthal as Indian Salesman
- Hilary Pritchard as Beverly "Bev"
- Claire Russell as Carole
- Felicity Devonshire as Barbara
- Geraldine Hart as Fran
- Jan Adair as Sandra
- Marianne Morris as Anne
- Bob Todd as Postman
- Fred Griffiths as Window Cleaner
- Debbie Monroe as Au Pair
- Bobby Sparrow as Dancing Girl

== Sequels ==
The film was followed by two sequels, also running around 50 minutes and both starring John Hamill as artist Alan Street. The first was Girls Come First (1975), directed by Joseph McGrath (credited as Croisette Meubles). This played as a prequel to the original (Sue Longhurst's character, Sue, was Street's girlfriend instead of his wife, and there is no mention of their young daughter Abigail), and was set mainly in a Soho nightclub where Street is commissioned by owner Hugh Jampton (Bill Kerr) to paint nude sketches of his female models for a magazine. The cast also included Burt Kwouk, Cheryl Gilham, Rikki Howard, Heather Deeley and Hazel O'Connor (credited as Hazel Glyn) in her first film role.

The third film in the series was Under the Bed (1977), directed by David Grant and set at a wedding party. Although Hamill reprised his role as Alan Street, Longhurst did not appear in this film, and the other cast members included Theresa Wood, Jayne Lester, Brian Godfrey, Lisa Taylor and Michael Cronin. This was also the only film in the series not to receive censorship cuts by the BBFC.

The first two films in the series were later edited together into one feature length movie which was also released as Girls Come First (with The Over Amorous Artist comprising the second half of the film).
