= The Way of a Man with a Maid =

Anonymous sadomasochistic erotic novel

The Way of a Man with a Maid is an anonymous, sadomasochistic, erotic novel, probably first published in 1908. The story is told in the first person by a gentleman called "Jack", who lures women he knows into a kind of erotic torture chamber, called "The Snuggery", in his house, and takes considerable pride in meticulously planned rapes which he describes in minute detail.

== Plot ==
Most of the story takes place in a room in a house called 'The Snuggery', which the narrator, "Jack", converts into an erotic torture chamber equipped with beds to which women can be strapped and held helpless. The room is soundproofed to ensure their screams go unheard. Other equipment includes cords and pulleys, flagellation implements, and a mechanical "Chair of Treachery" to which helpless females are lured to be restrained in.

The first of many victims lured into 'The Snuggery' is a girl called Alice, a member of Jack's social set who had earlier jilted him and on whom he takes revenge by subjecting her to a series of sexual acts without her consent. The description of Alice's rape, with the narrator repeatedly expressing great satisfaction at her fear and humiliation, takes the whole of the first part, called "The Tragedy". At its end, Alice has completely submitted and become Jack's willing sexual partner.

In the second part, called "The Comedy", Alice locates further victims for Jack, helps lure them to be raped in turn, and actively helps in making them sexually available to Jack. The rape scenes of Alice's servant girl, Fanny, and Alice's friend, Connie, follow the same pattern, with the new victims vainly protesting and resisting Jack, and then converted (as Jack puts it) into an eager sexual partner and an active accomplice in the rape of the next victim.

By the final episode, when the wealthy Lady Betty and her daughter Molly have been lured into the rape room, his earlier victims-turned-accomplices undress and restrain the women. Thereupon, mother and daughter are not only subjected to repeated rape, but also forced into a long series of incestuous acts with each other, carried out to inflict maximum humiliation and degradation upon them, and accompanied by endless gloating and taunting from Jack and his three female accomplices.

== Commentary ==
In his introduction to the Star edition of the book, Alexis Lykiard notes its mordant humour and opines that it "is that rarity – an entertaining, funny and sexy book". Susan Griffin comments that when the hero forces the heroine to remove her clothing he gloats over not her beauty but her humiliation: "The virgin is punished by carnality". It is then taken for granted sexual intercourse, even in the form of rape, will awaken any woman's sexual passions.

In addition to the "quite perverse" scenes of rape, bondage, mother-daughter incest, whipping and "odd things done with feathers" to force women into orgasm, the book has a major element of lesbianism.

== Origin of title ==
The book's title is derived from the Bible's Book of Proverbs, where the wise King Solomon mentions "The way of a man with a maid" as one of the "things which are too wonderful for me, yea, which I know not".

== Publication history ==
The date of first publication of The Way of a Man with a Maid is not printed in any of the early editions of this book. However, a note by a collector indicates that the first edition was published in Liverpool by H. W. Pickle & Co. in 1908. Previous suggestions that it was first published in 1895 or 1896 seem to be based on the erroneous back-dating – to 1896 – of a translation, by "the author of The Way of a Man with a Maid", of an erotic work called Parisian Frolics, which further research indicates was actually published c. 1912.

Grove Press put this book out as A Man with a Maid in 1968. On the "copyright" page ("All Rights Reserved") is the statement, "This is a reprint edition distributed by Bookthrift, New York".

The authorship of the book is unknown and has variously been attributed to John Farmer, George Reginald Bacchus and J. P. Kirkwood.

The protagonist, Jack, returns in three pastiche sequels.

There were variant texts with changes and additions. For example, a Hebrew translation current in Israel in the 1970s had an added "flashback" not found in the English original, according to which Molly had already undergone repeated anal rape by the doctor in her boarding school, before falling into Jack's hands.

== Film adaptations ==
The Way of a Man with a Maid was adapted in 1927 into the silent hardcore pornographic film An English Tragedy: Jack Deflowers Alice, which covers only a condensed version of the novel's first volume.

The book was adapted again as a softcore exploitation film entitled What the Swedish Butler Saw (1975), starring Sue Longhurst as Alice and Ole Soltoft as Jack.

Another adaptation of the book was released as The Naughty Victorians in 1975, a hardcore pornographic version by noted theater director Robert Sickinger. One of Jack's victims, the servant Fanny, is renamed Molly, and Lady Betty is renamed Lady Bunt, while her daughter (originally named Molly in the novel) is renamed Cecily. The character of Connie, Alice's friend, is omitted. In a twist on the ending, the four raped women team up at the end to get revenge on Jack.

== In other literature ==
Fragments of the story are read by one character to another in a pivotal scene of Shirley Jackson's novel Hangsaman (1951).

== Bibliography ==
- The Wordsworth Book of Classic Erotica (London 2007) contains the full text of The Way of a Man with a Maid and A Weekend Visit.
- The Way of a Man With a Maid by Anonymous (2009). Harper Perennial Forbidden Classics.
- A Man with a Maid by Anonymous (1968). Grove Press, New York. Full text of The Way of a Man with a Maid.
- Simon Sheridan Keeping the British End Up: Four Decades of Saucy Cinema (3rd edition) (Reynolds and Hearn Books, 2007) discusses the film.
