= Neil Hallett =

Belgian-born English actor (1924–2004)

- In The Avengers episode "The Winged Avenger" (1967)
- Born: John W. Neil; 30 June 1924; Brussels, Belgium
- Died: 5 December 2004 (aged 80); Spain
- Occupation: Actor
- Years active: 1947–1990
- Spouse: Tracy Reed (m. 1970; div. 1973)

Neil Hallett (born John W. Neil; 30 June 1924 – 5 December 2004) was a Belgian-born English actor. His stage name was taken from a combination of his proper surname, Neil, and his grandmother's maiden name, Hallet.

He began his acting career in regional repertory in 1947, making his West End debut two years later in the army comedy Maiden's Prayer. Also on stage, he spent over a year in the mid-1950s playing opposite David Tomlinson and Kathleen Harrison in the hit comedy All for Mary. He played the same role, again opposite Tomlinson and Harrison, in Wendy Toye's 1955 film version.

Starting in 1952, he appeared in many British television series, including The Adventures of Robin Hood, No Hiding Place, The Avengers, Out of the Unknown, Department S, Z-Cars, UFO, The New Avengers, Doctor Who and Jeeves and Wooster. He was also a regular in Ghost Squad (1962–64) and The Newcomers (1968–69), as well as co-starring with Ian Hendry and Jean Marsh in the 1966–67 series The Informer.

His films included X the Unknown (1956), Model for Murder (1959), Game for Vultures (1979), Juego de poder (Power Game; 1983) and such sexploitation titles as Groupie Girl (1970), Fun and Games (1971), Virgin Witch (1971), Can You Keep It Up for a Week? (1974) and Keep It Up Downstairs (1976). The last three of these, together with Game for Vultures, were produced by Hazel Adair.

He retired to Spain in 1991 and died, aged 80, in 2004.

== Screen credits ==
| Production | Year | Role | Notes |
|---|---|---|---|
| Three Steps to the Gallows | 1953 | Real Counterman (uncredited) | Film |
| Three Steps in the Dark | 1953 | | Film |
| The Grove Family | 1954 | Salesman | "Clean Sweep" |
| All for Mary | 1954 | Alphonse | TV movie |
| Douglas Fairbanks, Jr., Presents | 1954 | Bill | "Stand By" |
| The Brain Machine | 1955 | Detective Superintendent John Harris | Film |
| All for Mary | 1955 | Alphonse | Film |
| X the Unknown | 1956 | Unwin | Film |
| The Buccaneers | 1956–57 | Sam Bassett / Bosun Bassett / Hornigold / Barman / Pirate | 22 episodes |
| Potts and the Phantom Piper | 1957 | Mulaney | Unknown episode |
| Shadow Squad | 1957 | Phillip Buckland | 2 episodes: "Boomerang" (parts 1 and 2) |
| Esmé Divided | 1957 | Barry Teal | TV movie |
| White Hunter | 1957 | Inspector Summers | "The Prisoner" |
| OSS | 1958 | Falkenburg | "Operation Newsboy" |
| The Adventures of Ben Gunn | 1958 | Tom Morgan | 5 episodes |
| The Two-Headed Spy | 1958 | Hitler's Guard (uncredited) | Film |
| Mary Britten, M.D. | 1958 | | "A Partner from the Past" |
| The Adventures of Robin Hood | 1958–60 | Forester / Michael / Commander | "The Fire" / "Women's War" / "The Loaf" |
| Strictly Confidential | 1959 | Basil Wantage | Film |
| Model for Murder | 1959 | Sgt. Anderson | Film |
| The Giant Behemoth | 1959 | Helicopter Pilot (uncredited) | Film |
| The Adventures of William Tell | 1959 | Rothman | "The Traitor" |
| A Woman's Temptation | 1959 | Glyn | Film |
| ITV Play of the Week | 1959 | Captain / Anaesthetist | "The Killing of the King" / "Mr. Arcularis" |
| Top Floor Girl | 1959 | Dave | Film |
| The Four Just Men | 1959 | Sergeant | "The Deserter" |
| No Hiding Place | 1959–61 | Mr. Box / Peter Nash | "The Man Who Left His Coat" / "The Missing Suit" |
| Operation Cupid | 1960 | Tom | Film |
| Danger Tomorrow | 1960 | Police Inspector (uncredited) | Film |
| Man from Interpol | 1960 | Paul Denver / Curt Bridges | "The Key Witness" / "The Golden Shirri" |
| Transatlantic | 1960 | Evans | Film |
| The Cheaters | 1961 | The False David McCoy | "The Authentic McCoy" |
| Emergency – Ward 10 | 1961 | Ben Bingle | 1 episode |
| Dentist on the Job | 1961 | Warder | Film |
| Drama 61-67 | 1961 | John Jerome | "Drama '61: The Machine Calls It Murder" |
| Armchair Theatre | 1961 | Captain Charon | "The Truth About Helen" |
| The Vise | 1955–61 | Various roles | 9 episodes |
| Deadline Midnight | 1961 | Len Bryan | "Man in a Frame" |
| On the Fiddle | 1961 | 1st Australian | Film |
| BBC Sunday-Night Play | 1961 | "Cross of Iron" | Major Burton |
| Part-Time Wife | 1961 | Detective | Film |
| The Avengers | 1961–69 | Weber / Arnie Packer / Paul Ryder | "Dead of Winter" / "The Winged Avenger" / "Get-a-Way" |
| Crying Down the Lane | 1962 | News editor | 3 episodes |
| The Battleaxe | 1962 | Charles Whiley | Film |
| Jezebel ex UK | 1963 | | "Slow Boat to Niniveh" |
| Richard the Lionheart | 1963 | Lemuel | "The Raiders" |
| Ghost Squad | 1962–64 | Tony Miller / Snaith | 25 episodes |
| Rotten to the Core | 1965 | Guard Commander | Film |
| Knock on Any Door | 1965 | Edwards | "First Offender" |
| Thunderball | 1965 | Vulcan Bomber Pilot (uncredited) | Film |
| Redcap | 1966 | Capt. Bane | "The Pride of the Regiment" |
| The Informer | 1966–67 | Detective Sergeant Piper | 20 episodes |
| Late Night Horror | 1968 | Tom | "The Corpse Can't Play" |
| The Saint | 1968 | Bonner | "The People Importers" |
| Out of the Unknown | 1969 | Gruer | "The Naked Sun" |
| The Newcomers | 1968-69 | Charles Turner | 54 episodes |
| Department S | 1969 | Dr. Lang | "Black Out" |
| Counterstrike | 1969 | Inspector | "Nocturne" |
| Z-Cars | 1969 | Roy Welman | 3 episodes: "None the Worse" (parts 2–4) |
| Groupie Girl | 1970 | Detective Sergeant | Film |
| The Troubleshooters | 1970 | Bill Porteous | "Boys and Girls Come Out to Play" |
| UFO | 1970 | Dr. Joseph Kelly | "Close Up" |
| Melody | 1971 | Man in hospital | Film |
| Fun and Games | 1971 | Warden Thorne | Film |
| The Persuaders! | 1971 | Prentice | "That's Me Over There" |
| Shirley's World | 1972 | Mayhew | "Always Leave Them Laughing" |
| Virgin Witch | 1972 | Gerald Amberley | Film |
| Menace | 1973 | Det. Insp. Wellesley | "Tom" |
| Follyfoot | 1973 | Mr. Whitaker | "Uncle Joe" |
| Crime of Passion | 1973 | Inspector | "Henri" |
| The Protectors | 1973 | Dr. Dove | "Implicado" |
| Crown Court | 1973–78 | George Clement / Raymond White / George Lyne | "Treason: Part 1-3" / "Good and Faithful Friends: Part 1" / "The Change: Part 1" |
| Special Branch | 1974 | Duvalier | "Entente Cordiale" |
| Masquerade | 1974 | Trump | "Mützen ab!" |
| Marked Personal | 1974 | Harry Bingham | 2 episodes |
| Intimate Strangers | 1974 | Neil Wilmhurst | 1 episode |
| Happy Ever After | 1974–76 | Jean Paul Bouchard / Philip Conway | 1 episode / "The Novel" / "Holiday Plans" |
| Thriller | 1975 | John Pelham | "The Next Voice You See" |
| Can You Keep It Up for a Week? | 1975 | Gerry Grimwood | Film |
| Keep It Up Downstairs | 1976 | Percy Hampton | Film |
| The New Avengers | 1976–77 | Mark Clifford / Roberts | "Faces" / "Medium Rare" |
| The Four Feathers | 1978 | Colonel, North Surrey's | TV movie |
| Armchair Thriller | 1978 | Commander Lambert | "The Girl Who Walked Quickly: Part 4" |
| L'amour en question | 1978 | | Film |
| The Sweeney | 1978 | John Morris | "One of Your Own" |
| The Professionals | 1978 | David Hunter | "Rogue" |
| Return of the Saint | 1978 | Andrew | "Tower Bridge Is Falling Down" |
| Nelson's Touch | 1979 | Mess President | Short Film |
| Game for Vultures | 1979 | Tony Knight | Film |
| Bergerac | 1981 | Colonel | "Campaign for Silence" |
| 4D Special Agents | 1981 | Det. Insp. Porter | Film |
| Airline | 1982 | Sergeant / Gp. Capt. Lawson | "Conscience" / "Captain Clarke Plus One " |
| The Gaffer | 1982 | Colonel Upshot-Green | "The Candidate" |
| The Chinese Detective | 1982 | Mr. Fisher | "Trials" |
| Power Game | 1983 | | Film |
| Doctor Who | 1985 | Maylin Renis | "Timelash" |
| Inside Story | 1986 | Home Secretary | 2 episodes |
| Jeeves and Wooster | 1990 | Seppings | "Will Anatole Return to Brinkley Court? (or, the Matchmaker)", (final television appearance) |
