= Under the Doctor =

1976 British film by Gerry Poulson

- Directed by: Gerry Poulson
- Written by: Ron Bareham
- Produced by: Ron Bareham; Peter Harrison
- Starring: Barry Evans; Penny Spencer; Liz Fraser; Hilary Pritchard
- Cinematography: Ray Parslow
- Edited by: Mike Kaufman
- Music by: Jean Bouchéty
- Production companies: GPA Films; Thorrawood
- Distributed by: Alpha Films
- Release date: November 1976
- Running time: 84 minutes
- Country: United Kingdom
- Language: English

Under the Doctor is a 1976 British sex comedy directed by Gerry Poulson and starring Barry Evans, Penny Spencer, Liz Fraser and Hilary Pritchard. It was written by Ron Bareham.

It follows the antics of a Harley Street doctor, who enjoys dalliances with three of his female patients.

== Cast ==
- Barry Evans as Doctor Boyd, psychiatrist / Mr Johnson / Lt Cranshaw / Colin Foster
- Liz Fraser as Sandra
- Hilary Pritchard as Lady Victoria Stockbridge
- Penny Spencer as Marion Parson
- Jonathan Cecil as Rodney Harrington-Harrington / Lord Woodbridge
- Elizabeth Counsell as nurse Addison
- Peter Cleall as Wilkins, butler

== Production ==
It was shot at Isleworth Studios and on location around London.

== Critical reception ==
The Monthly Film Bulletin wrote: "A 'confessional' sex comedy neither startling, erotic or amusing, but none the less well up to the usual level of British witlessness. The jollifications include an attempted seduction with a sausage stuck upright in a plate of mashed potato, a reprise of the duel scene in Barry Lyndon, and Liz Fraser, a still game veteran of the genre, doing overblown imitations of Mae West and Marlene Dietrich."

In The Radio Times Guide to Films David Parkinson gave the film 1/5 stars, writing: "Such was the state of British screen comedy in the 1970s that even its stalwarts were reduced to accepting roles as nudie cuties. Indeed, Liz Fraser did nothing but peek-a-boo fluff in the middle of the decade, managing to retain her dignity while all else were losing their clothes."

Time Out wrote: "Amused by 'confessional sex comedies' like Tudor Gates' Intimate Games? Then here's your chance to guffaw at another remarkably similar bit of British rubbish. Harley Street psychiatrist listens to the stupefying fantasies of three women patients, and is at last – not surprisingly – driven bonkers by his work. Liz Fraser, a veteran of this sort of nonsense, is allowed to keep her bra on; the other women strip with the usual offhand indifference. No male genitalia, but a superabundance of wilting puns."

The film has a 4.2/10 rating on IMDb.
