= Whoops Baghdad =

1973 British TV comedy series

- Genre: Sitcom
- Directed by: John Howard Davies
- Starring: Frankie Howerd; Derek Francis; Hilary Pritchard; Anna Brett; Larry Martyn
- Country of origin: United Kingdom
- Original language: English
- No. of series: 1
- No. of episodes: 6 (list of episodes)

Production
- Editor: John Howard Davies
- Running time: 30 minutes
- Production company: BBC

Original release
- Network: BBC1
- Release: 25 January – 1 March 1973

Whoops Baghdad (also known as Frankie Howerd in Whoops Baghdad) is a BBC television comedy programme first broadcast from 25 January to 1 March 1973.

Starring Frankie Howerd, it was similar to his earlier programme Up Pompeii!, with the setting moved from Ancient Rome to medieval Baghdad. Unlike its predecessor, all six episodes exist. The original proposed title, Up Baghdad, was rejected because it was felt that it might have been seen as supportive of the then-current Iraqi regime.

== Cast ==
- Frankie Howerd as Ali Oopla, servant to the Wazir (all episodes)
- Derek Francis as Abu ben Ackers, Wazir and Prime Minister of Old Baghdad (all episodes)
- Hilary Pritchard as Saccharine, the Wazir's youngest and most innocent daughter (all episodes)
- Anna Brett as Boobiana, the Wazir's oldest and most well developed daughter (5 episodes)
- Larry Martyn as Derti Dhoti the beggar (5 episodes)
- Alan Curtis as Captain of the Guard/Havabanana/Sheikh Akabar the Vile/Robber (5 episodes)
- Norman Chappell as Imshi the eunuch, caretaker of the Caliph's harem (2 episodes)
- Lee Young as Genie of the bottle (2 episodes)
- Bill Fraser as Wizard Prang/Caliph of Old Baghdad (2 episodes)
- Ronnie Brody as Mustafa Shufti, Wizard Prang's assistant (1 episode)
- Josephine Tewson as Fatima the Marriage Broker (1 episode)
- Patrick Troughton as Tambalane the Tartar (1 episode)
- Jane Murdoch as Tangerine (1 episode)
- Winifred Sabine as Tambalane's first wife (1 episode)
- Milton Reid as the harem's hairdresser (1 episode)
- June Whitfield as Charisma (1 episode)
- Debbie McGee as belly dancer (1 episode)
- George Ballantine as Sinbad the Sailor (1 episode)
- Valerie Stanton as Shannonar (1 episode)

== Episode list ==
No.	Title	Directed by	Written by	Original release date
1	"The Wazir Takes a Wife"	John Howard Davies	Sid Colin, David McKellar, David Nobbs	25 January 1973
Ali Oopla, servant to Abu ben Ackers, Wazir of Old Baghdad, must find his master a new wife to look after his troublesome daughters, the innocent Saccharine and the overdeveloped Boobiana. Ali finds a beautiful woman named Shannonar to marry the Wazir, only for Ali to face execution when Shannonar turns out to be the Caliph's new concubine. Luckily, the Guard Captain agrees to ignore the whole thing when Saccharine innocently reveals the Captain tried to "give her one" while picking flowers in the woods.
2	"Festival of Magic"	John Howard Davies	Peter Vincent, Bob Hedley	1 February 1973
The Caliph's Royal Command Performance approaches with Wizard Prang as the main act. Ali overhears an assassin sent by Tambalane the Tartar plotting to impersonate Prang and use his magic powder to turn the Caliph into a frog. The assassin steals the powder and turns Prang into a frog. Ali tries to warn the Wazir but accidentally turns him into a frog too. Ali also disguises himself as Prang and tricks the assassin into handing over the powder, which Ali uses to turn the assassin into a frog and return Prang to normal, saving the day. However, Prang runs out of powder before the Wazir can be returned to normal and must fetch more from his home in China.
3	"Genie of the Bottle"	John Howard Davies	Sid Colin, Maurice Sellar, Roy Tuvey	8 February 1973
The Wazir has financial troubles and plans to wed Saccharine and Boobiana to the wealthy Sultan of Bangalore. When the Sultan demands a 10,000 Dinar dowry the Wazir threatens to sell Ali unless he can somehow find the money. Ali comes across a Genie in a bottle who grants Ali the money as his first wish, but when Saccharine and Boobiana see their elderly future husband they beg Ali to save them. Using his second wish Ali has the money turned into sand and the wedding is cancelled. Ali plans to use the third wish to get seven beautiful maidens for himself, but Boobiana sells the Genie's bottle to a wine merchant who gets the seven maidens instead.
4	"A Cargo of Crumpet"	John Howard Davies	Maurice Sellar, Roy Tuvey	15 February 1973
Saccharine and Boobiana organise a revolt among the Caliph’s harem. The Wazir blames Ali and threatens to have him executed unless he can find a new concubine for the Caliph. Ali finds Boobiana at the Concubine market making a stand for women's rights and has to spend the Wazir's money to buy her back. Meanwhile the Caliph's new concubine is bought by Sheik Akabar the Vile so the Wazir give Ali until sunrise to get her back. Ali manages to trap Akabar in a closet and steals the concubine for the Caliph who gives Ali all his former concubines in gratitude, but Akabar breaks out of the closet and Ali must give him the concubines in exchange for his life.
5	"Ali and the Thieves"	John Howard Davies	Sid Colin, David McKellar, Maurice Sellar, Roy Tuvey	22 February 1973
Havabanana the tribesman kidnaps the Wazir so his master, Tambalane the Tartar, can ransom him. Ali poses as a soothsayer after learning Tambalane has offered a reward to find his missing wife, Tangerine. With Saccharine in disguise Ali pretends he has summoned Tangerine, but the trick is exposed by Havabanana. Fearing execution Ali begs God to produce Tambalane's wife, and his prayer is answered when Tambalane's elderly first wife magically appears. Tangerine also appears and reveals Havabanana kidnapped her for himself. With Tangerine returned Tambalane frees the Wazir and gifts an unfortunate Ali his elderly first wife as his reward.
6	"Saved from the Harem"	John Howard Davies	Sid Colin	1 March 1973
The Caliph demands Saccharine join his harem. Ali suggests Saccharine get married so the Caliph can't have her. Saccharine naively refuses since her husband would be a married man, and Ali taught her never to sleep with married men. The Guard Captain retrieves Saccharine so Ali poses as hairdresser Ali the Barber to infiltrate the harem and find Saccharine with help from Charisma, the head concubine. Ali poses as Saccharine, causing the Caliph to flee in disgust. Saccharine returns home, but Ali, still dressed as Saccharine, is caught by Sinbad the Sailor, who has been at sea without a woman for 15 years.
