= Death Ship (1980 film) =

1980 horror film directed by Alvin Rakoff

- Death Ship theatrical poster
- Directed by: Alvin Rakoff
- Screenplay by: John Robins
- Story by: Jack Hill; David P. Lewis
- Produced by: Derek Gibson; Harold Greenberg
- Starring: Richard Crenna; George Kennedy; Nick Mancuso; Sally Ann Howes; Kate Reid
- Cinematography: René Verzier
- Edited by: Mike Campbell
- Music by: Ivor Slaney
- Production company: Bloodstar Productions
- Distributed by: Astral Media (Canada); EMI Films (UK)
- Release dates: March 7, 1980 (Texas & Florida); April 4, 1980 (Edmonton)
- Running time: 91 minutes
- Countries: Canada; United Kingdom
- Box office: $1.75 million

Death Ship is a 1980 horror film directed by Alvin Rakoff and starring Richard Crenna, George Kennedy, Nick Mancuso, Sally Ann Howes, Kate Reid, Victoria Burgoyne, and Saul Rubinek in an early role. The screenplay by John Robins was based on a story by co-written by Jack Hill.

A British-Canadian co-production, the film was shot on-location off of Dauphin Island, Alabama and in Quebec City. It was director Rakoff's only horror film, and upon release received mixed-to-negative reviews, but has developed a cult following.

== Plot ==
Prickly Captain Ashland is leading his cruise ship on his final voyage, attended by his replacement, Trevor Marshall, who brought his family along. In the middle of the night following a routine Caribbean route, their radar detects a mysterious black freighter on a collision course that matches their heading regardless of evasive maneuvers. Despite Ashland's best efforts, the ships collide, sinking the cruise ship and taking most of her crew and passengers with it.

The next day, a handful of survivors — Marshall, his wife Margaret, their children Robin and Ben, a young officer named Nick and his love interest Lori, the ship's comic Jackie, and a passenger, Mrs. Morgan — are adrift on a large wreckage. Ashland surfaces nearby, and he is brought aboard, barely conscious. Later, the survivors come upon the black freighter, unaware it is the ship that attacked them. Finding a boarding ladder slung from the stern, they climb aboard, but not before the ladder plunges into the sea as the officers try to climb it with the injured Ashland. When all are finally aboard, Jackie tries to rally the survivors with humor, but a cable seizes him by the ankle, and he is swung outboard by one of the ship's cranes, which lowers him into the water before cutting him loose, to be swept astern and lost.

Shocked, the survivors explore the corridors of the empty, echoing vessel, finding only cobwebs and 1930s memorabilia. Hatches open and close by themselves, and lights go on and off while a swinging block knocks out Nick, who is exploring above deck. Meanwhile, a delirious Ashland hears a mysterious, disembodied voice speaking to him in German. The others finally set up in a dusty bunk room and separate to retrieve supplies and the injured captain. Mrs. Morgan finds a gramophone and a movie projector that suddenly turn on. While watching the film (1936's Everything Is Rhythm) and eating a piece of hard candy from one of the ship's cupboards, she begins decomposing and becomes grotesquely deformed. Terrified, she stumbles back to the bunk room, where a possessed Ashland strangles her.

Now awake, and possessed by the ship's dead captain, Ashland dons a Kriegsmarine officer's uniform and announces that he is the captain. Upon visiting the chart room, Marshall and Nick see that the map of the ship's course shows that it just travels around the Atlantic in huge circles. They both decide to escape, but are thwarted when the ship's lifeboats lower into the sea by themselves and drift away. Despairing, the survivors try to get some rest but are further taunted by Ashland, who now prowls the ship's passages. While the children stumble upon a radio room which starts playing "Horst-Wessel-Lied", Lori goes into shock when her shower water turns to blood. She is then tossed overboard by Ashland.

Marshall and Nick make a chilling discovery: the ship was once a Nazi torture ship, and the ghosts of its inmates and crew are still aboard. They are attacked by the piercing whine of the ship's electronics as the projector begins showing old newsreel footage of Adolf Hitler. Nick lunges at Ashland, but instead plunges into a net holding skeletal remains, where Ashland drowns him. Ashland tells Marshall that the ship is possessed by the spirits of its long-dead crew, and hunts other boats in its path, destroying them and luring the survivors on board to kill them and feed on their blood. Marshall manages to stab a gloating Ashland, apparently killing him and stopping the ship. Searching below, Marshall finds a life raft in a freezer full of the frozen bodies of downed RAF airmen and Soviet sailors. Still, as the children jump overboard, Margaret is captured by a resurrected Ashland and trapped in a chain locker. Marshall is knocked out by Ashland, but awakens in time to find Margaret, who has escaped from the locker. Captain Ashland attempts to shoot the escaping Marshall family.

Meanwhile, the crew's spirits detect another cruise liner and begin to give chase, ignoring Ashland, who wants it to run down the Marshalls' raft instead. Trying to retake control of the ship, Ashland storms into the engine room and shoots at the machinery in vain, but falls into the steering gear and is crushed to death. His screams of agony echo throughout the ship, joining those of its earlier victims. Above, the Marshalls rejoice as the freighter turns and sails away. After drifting for some time, they are spotted by a search helicopter and rescued.

Afterward, the Death Ship is shown steaming along at full speed. It heads for another passenger ship, and the triumphant blasting of its horn accompanies the collision sounds.

== Cast ==
- Richard Crenna as Trevor Marshall
- George Kennedy as Captain Ashland
- Nick Mancuso as Nick
- Sally Ann Howes as Margaret Marshall
- Kate Reid as Sylvia Morgan
- Victoria Burgoyne as Lori
- Jennifer McKinney as Robin Marshall
- Danny Higham as Ben Marshall
- Saul Rubinek as Jackie
- Murray Cruchley as Parsons
- Anthony Sherwood as Seaman

== Production ==
The film was based on a script written by Jack Hill called Bloodstar, which was inspired by Steven Spielberg's Duel. Hill originally wanted to direct himself, but the Canadian Film Development Corporation required a Canadian director for the production to qualify for tax credits. The working title was Adrift and Beyond.

Location filming took place off of Dauphin Island, Alabama and Mobile Bay in the Gulf of Mexico. According to director Alvin Rakoff, the production sourced a disused tanker in Biloxi that was due to be scrapped. The ship's engine broke down after a single hour, and had to be towed for the remainder of filming. The rest of the film was shot at a studio in Quebec City. Principal photography lasted from 7 June to 10 July 1979.

The shipwreck sequences reuse footage from The Last Voyage (1960) and S.O.S. Titanic (1979).

== Release ==
Death Ship was released in 250 theatres in Wisconsin, Texas and Florida on March 7, 1980 where it was distributed by Avco Embassy Pictures. It was released in Edmonton, Canada where it was distributed by Astral Films.

== Reception ==
=== Box office ===
The film was a box office disappointment.

=== Critical response ===
From a contemporary review, Steven Jenkins reviewed the film in the Monthly Film Bulletin, stating that the film had a "promising central idea - an ex-Nazi torture ship prowling the ocean in search of blood - is interred in a particularly pedestrian narrative." The review also critiqued the "arbitrary borrowing from the Psycho showerbath sequence, down to specific shots and camera angles open the way for some overt sadistic voyeurism."

TV Guide awarded the film 1 out of a possible 5 stars, calling the film "So ludicrous it's quite funny." Jeremy Biltz from DVD Talk gave the film a positive review, writing, "Death Ship isn't a perfect film, but it is an enjoyable one, especially for fans of the somewhat lower tier horror efforts of the late seventies and early eighties."

In a retrospective review, Richard Scheib of Moria gave the film two stars. He noted that the film "was regarded as a flop when it came out", but called it "one of the classic works" among haunted ship films and wrote that director Alvin Rakoff "builds the foreboding menace up well". Scheib was more critical of the plot, writing that the film "never does much beyond throwing novelty death scenes together". A 2008 review published by Bloody Disgusting called it "a mediocre haunted ship film that suffers from both poor writing and direction".

Film review aggregator Rotten Tomatoes reported an approval rating of 33%, based on 9 reviews.
