= Au Pair Girls =

1972 British film by Val Guest

- Theatrical release poster
- Directed by: Val Guest
- Screenplay by: Val Guest; David Adnopoz
- Story by: David Grant
- Produced by: Guido Coen
- Starring: Gabrielle Drake; Astrid Frank; Me Me Lai; Nancie Wait
- Cinematography: John Wilcox
- Edited by: John Colville
- Music by: Roger Webb
- Production company: Kenneth Shipman Productions
- Distributed by: Tigon Pictures
- Release date: September 1972
- Running time: 86 minutes
- Country: United Kingdom
- Language: English

Au Pair Girls is a 1972 British sex comedy film directed by Val Guest and starring Gabrielle Drake, Astrid Frank, Me Me Lai and Nancie Wait. Part of the British 1970s softcore sex comedy genre, the film also includes appearances by mainstream actors Trevor Bannister, Richard O'Sullivan, John Le Mesurier, Ferdy Mayne, Geoffrey Bayldon and Johnny Briggs.

A sequel, Glamour Incorporated, was also to have been directed by Guest but was never produced.

== Plot ==
Four young female au pairs are seen arriving at Heathrow Airport. They are then taken to the office of the Overseas Employment Agency in London, which has arranged placements for them.

Anita Sector is assigned to Mr and Mrs Howard. She does not prove popular with Mr Howard as she manages to flood the house while taking a shower and then disappears on a date with Malcolm, a man who preyed on her at the airport. They visit a casino where Anita meets Sheik El Abab and disappears with him after Malcolm loses money at the roulette table. When she is taken to the sheik's home, she spends time with his concubines and discovers that he is a very wealthy philanthropist. When the sheik tries to seduce Anita, she realises that her deadline for returning to the Howards' house has passed. She reaches the house to find her suitcases on the doorstep.

Randi Lindstrom is assigned to the family of businessman Mr Wainwright. She is picked up by his son Stephen, who is immediately attracted to her. After a series of mishaps, Stephen and Randi end up back at Mr Wainwright's offices and have sex in the car, where they are found naked by a shocked Mr Wainwright the next morning.

Nan Lee is assigned to Lord and Lady Tryke as a playmate for their son Rupert, who is being groomed as a concert pianist. Rupert's exposure to the outside world has been limited to trips out in the car and he is immature for his age due to a lack of appropriate interaction with other young people. Nan plays along with Rupert's children's games in the garden and after dinner. Later, she reflects on Rupert's immaturity but realises that she has enjoyed her time with him. She seduces him and quietly leaves the next morning.

Christa Geisler is assigned to the Fairfax family. Learning that Christa is a virgin, their daughter Carole decides to take her along to see pop star Ricky Strange. Carole and Christa go shopping to buy a more revealing outfit that will help Christa to arouse Ricky. Christa meets Ricky after his performance and ends up having sex with him, quickly followed by Carole's boyfriend Buster, but this is all revealed to have been a ruse by Carole to enable her to have sex with Ricky. After Christa realises that she has been used, she confides in Buster, who is understanding despite his boorish personality. Next morning, she tells Carole that she is leaving and terminates her employment with the Fairfaxes.

Randi, Nan and Christa end up back at the agency. Anita arrives and asks them if they want to join her as new concubines for the sheik. They immediately accept, and all four au pairs get into the sheik's car and are driven away.

== Cast ==
- Astrid Frank as Anita Sector
- Johnny Briggs as Malcolm
- Gabrielle Drake as Randi Lindstrom
- Me Me Lay as Nan Lee
- Nancie Wait as Christa Geisler
- Joyce Heron as Mrs Stevenson
- Daphne Anderson as Mrs Howard
- Geoffrey Bayldon as Mr Howard
- Roger Avon as Rathbone
- Rosalie Crutchley as Lady Tryke
- Harold Bennett as Lord Tryke
- Julian Barnes as Rupert Tryke
- John Le Mesurier as Mr 'BW' Wainwright
- Richard O'Sullivan as Stephen Wainwright
- Derek Gray as Farmer
- Charles Morgan as Fred
- Marianne Stone as Mrs Fairfax
- Lyn Yeldham as Carole Fairfax
- Norman Chappell as Salesman
- Robin Ford as Croupier
- Ferdy Mayne as Sheik El Abab
- John Standing as Buster
- Steve Patterson as Ricky Strange
- Trevor Bannister as Photographer
- Christine Donna as Karen
- Milton Reid as The Guard
- Marcia Fox as Eve
- Carole Catkin as Dawn

== Production ==
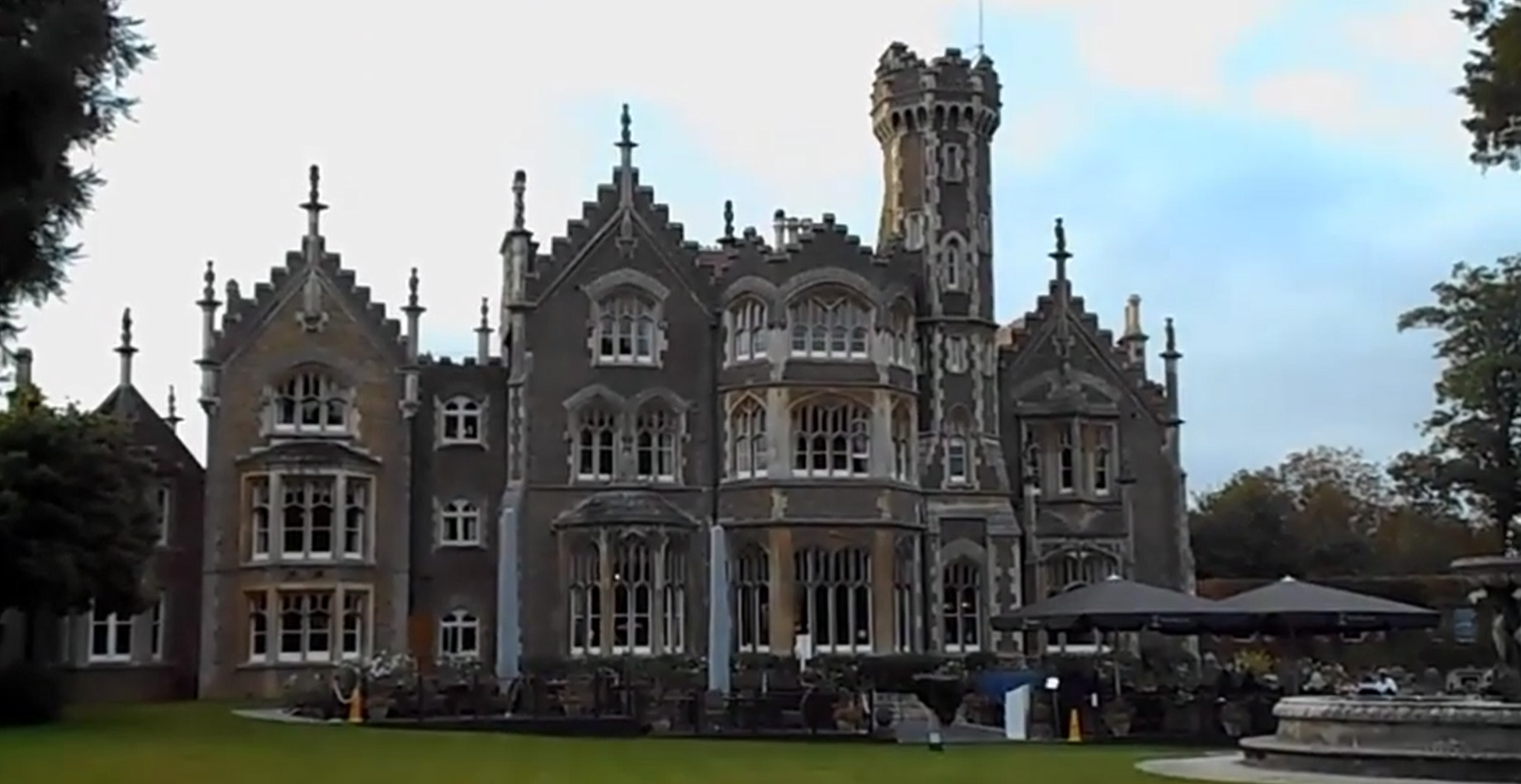
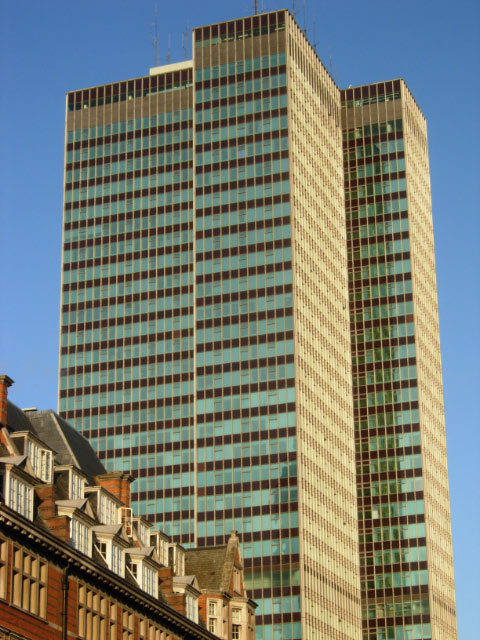
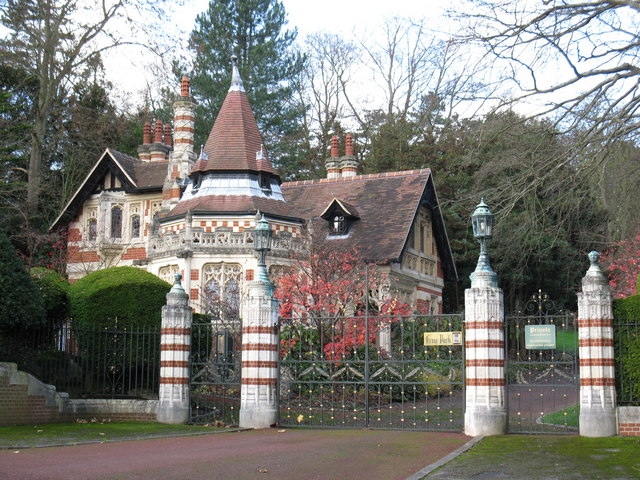
The film's shooting locations included Oakley Court (top left), Euston Tower (right) and Friar Park (bottom left).

Au Pair Girls was director Val Guest's first sex comedy. Unfamiliar with the genre, he decided to view a number of foreign sex comedies in preparation, turning to ex-BBFC censor John Trevelyan for suggestions. The original script was adapted from a story by pornographic film producer David Grant. Guest disliked its explicit sexual content and made numerous revisions before agreeing to film it.

Guest says "We had a lot of very good names in it. Upmarket names so it wouldn't just be a skin-flick."

Principal photography began in January 1972. Shooting locations were based in and around London. The opening scenes were filmed at Heathrow Airport, with Mr Wainwright's office represented by Euston Tower and the Tryke family home by Oakley Court in Bray, Berkshire. Most of the scenes featuring Nan Lee (Me Me Lay) were filmed at Friar Park, George Harrison's mansion in Henley-on-Thames, Oxfordshire.

== Release and reception ==
The film was released in September 1972. In 1988 Guest said "It made an awful lot of money, it went on cassette and we're still getting cheques in from it."

=== Critical ===
In a contemporary review, Derek Elley of The Monthly Film Bulletin wrote: "Val Guest hits rock bottom with this humourless attempt at a sex comedy ... Gabrielle Drake and Astrid Frank just manage to keep the film moving, but as the national jokes pile relentlessly on top of one another, the principal diversion becomes the spotting of familiar British faces in the unlikeliest of roles."

Commentator Simon Sheridan describes the film as a "funky, swinging feast of fun". He adds that while many sex comedies of the 1960s and 70s stereotyped female au pairs as "sexually provocative sexpots", Au Pair Girls was the first British film to cast them as the main characters.

Brian Davidson of Cinema Retro magazine writes that the film's "chauvinistic treatment of women" would make it objectionable to many modern audiences. He also argues that while the film is ostensibly a comedy, "at least half of its running time has little to do with humour. While on the one hand it is a celebration of the liberal sexual attitudes of the time ... on the other, it ultimately condemns those same attitudes." He considers the film unusual for the genre in its portrayal of Christa (Nancie Wait), whose unhappy story "forces us to reconsider our response to everything that has gone before."

Guest rejected claims that the film is pornographic, instead calling it "art". In an interview with Cinema X magazine, he described the film's depiction of sex as "all fun; it's bubble. There is absolutely no violence or kinks. There are no lesbians, no queers and no whips; nothing like that at all." In his autobiography, he distanced himself from Au Pair Girls and his later sex comedy Confessions of a Window Cleaner, stating that he preferred to be remembered for his earlier work.
