= The Winged Avenger =

- The Avengers episode
- Episode no.: Season 5 Episode 6
- Directed by: Gordon Flemyng & Peter Duffell
- Written by: Richard Harris
- Original air dates: 15 February 1967 (Southern Television); 18 February 1967 (ABC Weekend TV)

Guest appearances
- Nigel Green; Colin Jeavons; Jack MacGowran; Neil Hallett

Episode chronology
← Previous "The Bird Who Knew Too Much"	Next → "The Living Dead"

"The Winged Avenger" is the sixth episode of the fifth series of the 1960s cult British spy-fi television series The Avengers, starring Patrick Macnee and Diana Rigg, and guest starring Nigel Green, Colin Jeavons, Jack MacGowran, and Neil Hallett. It was first broadcast in the Southern and Tyne Tees regions of the ITV network on Wednesday 15 February 1967. ABC Weekend Television, who commissioned the show for ITV, broadcast it in its own regions three days later on Saturday 18 February. The episode was written by Richard Harris, and directed by Gordon Flemyng & Peter Duffell.

This episode contains additional cartoon drawings by Frank Bellamy.

== Plot ==
One night, a figure in a bird costume breaks into the office of Simon Roberts, the owner of a publishing company, and slashes him to death. As Roberts’ office was on the top floor of a skyscraper, Steed and Peel are called in by Roberts’ son Peter to investigate the murder due to the improbability of an assailant being able to access the office. Steed and Peel are baffled but resolve to continue looking into the matter as Roberts is not the first businessman to be killed in such circumstances. That night, Peter is also murdered in the same office and manner as his father, further confusing the two agents.

An audio dictation made by Peter just before he died refers to an ongoing legal battle between the Roberts publishing company and Sir Lexius Cray, an acclaimed mountaineer who is one of their authors. The battle is over the profits from Cray’s memoirs. Peel meets with Cray, who she discovers to be a carer of numerous birds. Cray’s butler Tay-Ling knows the assailant's identity and proceeds to blackmail them. Peel returns to Cray’s country mansion at night to further investigate and discovers the assailant entering the grounds, but it is too late to save Tay-Ling from being murdered.

Cray confronts Peel, and the two discuss the murder. Based on evidence found by Tay-Ling’s body, Cray reveals that an inventor named Professor Poole had previously asked him to endorse a pair of boots that allowed the wearer to climb quickly up walls. Steed and Peel go to visit Poole, who is significantly eccentric and obsessed with birds, to the extent that he acts like one whenever he can. With no leads, Steed and Peel identify ruthless industrialist Edward J. Dumayn as the most likely next target. Before they can meet him, Dumayn is also killed by the bird-like assailant. The manner and marks of the murders lead the two to consider how similar the assailant is to the ‘Winged Avenger’, the hero of a comic book that Peel found just by Tay-Ling’s body.

At the headquarters of Winged Avenger Enterprises, the comic book production company, Steed encounters illustrator Arnie Packer, story writer Stanton and actor Julian, who plays the Winged Avenger in costume. Tensions are apparent between Packer and Stanton, whilst Julian uses method acting when dressed as the Avenger. However, Steed finds nothing suspicious beyond this. Peel returns to Poole’s house at night and finds him using the boots to climb the walls and ceilings. Poole reveals that the boots work using magnetic fields and that the only other pair was sold to an anonymous bidder from Winged Avenger Enterprises.

Peel overhears an argument between Packer and Stanton at the headquarters before confronting them, posing as a representative from a novelty gifts company. She tells them she has the boots to hand, causing Packer to laugh and Stanton to look suspicious. Later, Julian is murdered in his Winged Avenger costume by the assailant wearing precisely the same clothing. Steed returns to the offices and finds Julian’s dead body, He examines storyboards to see illustrations of Professor Poole in peril. Poole, facing such exact circumstances, calls Mrs Peel simultaneously to lure her back to his home.

Stanton returns and holds Steed at gunpoint, but Steed swiftly disarms him. Stanton protests his innocence, and the two work out that Packer is the assailant, having produced his series of storyboards predicting Mrs Peel being murdered at Poole’s house. Peel is attacked at Poole’s home but manages to escape, although finds Poole’s corpse hanging upside down. She uses Poole’s pair of boots to evade and confront Packer. In a conversation with him, Peel discovers that Packer has gone mad and is convinced he is the Winged Avenger. Steed and Stanton arrive whilst Peel and Packer fight on the ceiling. The two agents work together to defeat Packer, who falls from the window to his death.

== Cast ==
- Patrick Macnee as John Steed
- Diana Rigg as Emma Peel
- Nigel Green as Sir Lexius Cray
- Jack MacGowran as Professor Poole
- Neil Hallett as Arnie Packer
- Colin Jeavons as Stanton
- Roy Patrick as Julian
- John Garrie as Tay-Ling
- Donald Pickering as Peter Roberts
- William Fox as Simon Roberts
- A. J. Brown as Dawson
- Hilary Wontner as Edward J. Dumayn
- John Crocker as Fothers
- Ann Sidney as Gerda

== Cultural references ==
In the final battle, Packer is hit with large framed comic strip panels with words like "Pow!" painted on them. This parodies the Batman TV series where similar words were flashed on the screen during a fight between Batman and Robin and the villains, and the theme music from the series is played during the scene.
