= Jean Bouchéty =

French bassist, composer, and conductor (1920–2006)

- Born: March 1, 1920
- Died: July 19, 2006 (aged 86)
- Occupations: Musician, bassist, composer and conductor

Jean Bouchéty (March 1, 1920, L'Étang-la-Ville — July 19, 2006) was a French musician, bassist, composer and conductor. He has composed several soundtracks.

== Biography ==
=== Period jazz ===
In 1949, Jean Bouchéty was a double bass player in Geo Daly's jazz quartet, alongside Bernard Peiffer on piano and Roger Paraboschi on drums. They recorded the first 78 rpm by Geo Daly: "Nine O'Clock Jump" and "Moonglow" first with the Swing record label, then at Jazztime.

== Conductor ==
Jean Bouchéty accompanied with his orchestra a certain number of French singers in studio recordings.

- 1958: Hugues Aufray for the song "Le Poinçonneur des Lilas".
- 1959: Jean Philippe for the single whose song "Oui oui oui oui" represented France at the Eurovision Song Contest 1959.
- 1960: José Bartel for the song "In the streets of Bahia".
- 1961: Eddy Mitchell for the two songs on the 100% rock disc which is the first record of Les Chaussettes Noires. "Betty" by Mitchell and Bouchéty. "La Bamba Rock" (a version of Ritchie Valens's "La Bamba" arranged by Bouchéty).
- 1963: Claude François for several songs including "Dis-lui", "Walk Straight Ahead" and "I Would Like to Get Married".
- 1964: Eddy Mitchell for several songs including "Always a Corner That Reminds Me"
- 1964: Jean-Jacques Debout for the single including the songs "Our Fingers Crossed"
- 1966: Éric Charden for the song "You Will not See Me" (texts by Bryan Mu, aka Eric Charden).
- 1966: Eddy Mitchell for the album including "I Forgot to Forget It", "Société anonyme", "And Now", "What I'm Looking for is in You"
- 1966: Michel Orso for the song "Angélique"
- 1967: Michel Polnareff for the songs "Cuddly Soul", "The King of Ants", "Ta Ta Ta", "Under Which Star Am I Born?"
- 1967: Éric Charden for "The World is Gray, the World is Blue"
- 1967: Nicoletta for several songs including "Vis ta vie" and "Think of the Summer"
- 1967: Jacqueline Taïeb for "7 O'clock in the Morning"
- 1967: Michel Fugain for "I Will Not Have Time"
- 1968: Michel Fugain for the song "À nous deux Paris (Je pars)"
- 1968: Jacqueline Dulac for the song "Le Printemps à Paris".
- 1968: Nicoletta for several songs including "He Died the Sun" and "Live for Love"
- 1968: Eddy Mitchell for several songs including "I Love You Only" and "I Seed the Wind"
- 1970: Nicoletta for several songs including "La solitude ça existe pas"
- 1970: Mireille Mathieu for the songs "C'est Dommage" and "C'est un peu la France"
- 1971: Mireille Mathieu for the songs "Give Your Heart, Give Your Life", "I Do Not Know, Do Not Know", "You I Desire"
- 1972: Michel Fugai] and The Big Bazaar. All songs including "Une belle histoire" and "Fais comme l'oiseau"
- 1972: Daniel Guichard for the album including "La Tendresse" and "Do Not Cry Like That"
- 1973: Éric Vincent for the songs "Sans famille" and "So Many Things"
- 1974: Dalida for the song "He Had Just Turned 18"
- 1976: Éric Vincent for the songs "A Country Somewhere" and "The Flowers Fade Between My Fingers"
- 1980: Éric Vincent for the album "Harmoniques"
- 1983: Éric Vincent for the album "Voyage for the Immediate"

== Soundtracks ==
Maurice Geoffrey and Jean Bouchéty Jean-François Boulet, Alfred Rode, conductor of the orchestra: Jean Bouchéty (Éditions Salvet)

- 1965: Yoyo by Pierre Étaix, orchestration of Jean Bouchéty
- 1966: The Game Is Over by Roger Vadim, music by Jean Bouchéty and Jean-Pierre Bourtayre
- 1966: As Long as You've Got You're Health by Pierre Étaix, (as orchestrator)
- 1973: I Don't Know Much, But I'll Say Everything by Pierre Richard, musical arrangement by Jean Bouchéty
- 1975: Trop c'est trop by Didier Kaminka
- 1976: Under the Doctor by Gerry Poulson
- 1978: Lovelier than Love by Hans Dittmer
- 1980: C'est Encore Loin L'Amerique? by Roger Coggio
- 1980: Cherchez l'erreur by Serge Korber, music: Jean Bouchéty and Roger Candy
- 1981: Belles, blondes et bronzées by Max Pecas, music: Jean Bouchéty and Roger Candy
- 1981: Comment draguer toutes les filles by Michel Vocoret, music: Jean Bouchéty and Roger Candy
- 1982: Le Bourgeois gentilhomme (based on the play of the same name by Molière) by Roger Coggio, music: Jean Bouchéty and Roger Candy
