= She'll Follow You Anywhere =

1971 British film by David C. Rea

- Theatrical release poster (US)
- Directed by: David C. Rea
- Screenplay by: David C. Rea; Theo Martin
- Story by: Peter Newbrook
- Produced by: Peter Newbrook
- Starring: Kenneth Cope; Keith Barron; Richard Vernon; Hilary Pritchard
- Cinematography: Ted Moore
- Edited by: Maxine Julius
- Music by: Gordon Rose
- Production company: Glendale Film Productions
- Distributed by: Scotia-Barber Distributors Limited
- Release date: 19 March 1972 (UK)
- Running time: 96 minutes
- Country: United Kingdom
- Language: English

She'll Follow You Anywhere, released in the United States as Passion Potion, is a 1971 British comedy film directed by David C. Rea and starring Kenneth Cope, Keith Barron and Richard Vernon. Two chemists working in a lab of a big corporation accidentally stumble across a love potion while working to create a new aftershave.

== Plot ==
One day on the way home from work, Mike Carter finds himself propositioned by a woman on the train. He has been working on developing a new aftershave for his company along with his friend and colleague Alan Simpson. When Alan has a similar encounter with one of the women scientists at their office, they both realise it is linked to one of the numerous aftershave formulas they have developed creating a love potion which makes them irresistible to any woman.

The two men begin to test their formula with some success with the women of London. They persuade themselves that before they take it to their boss, the strict Andrew Coombes, they must give it extensive testing to make sure it does not contain any unsavoury side effects. Eager to keep their discovery secret from their wives, they begin to use an old army hut in Effingham for their trials, taking woman back there who they have picked up on the train.

When they begin to run out of the formula, they attempt to create some more using the original recipe. When this does not have any effect on woman, they realise that it must be due to a contaminated chemical that they put in the original potion. They try to locate it, but all issues of it have been destroyed. They begin doing tests to try to find the missing ingredient that will make their potion work.

Their wives are becoming increasingly suspicious about their strange behaviour, and their boss is demanding that they produce a new aftershave to a deadline. When they accidentally allow their boss to get hold of the secret, he too discovers its potency with his secretary. When the two men's wives arrive in London on a surprise shopping trip, the two men fear the game is up. They confess to their boss about the real nature of the potion, and the trials they have been conducting at Effingham. When the three men go to Effingham they discover the army are now demolishing the old huts, and the remaining potion is destroyed by accident. Coombes now threatens them with the sack, threatening to reveal to their wives what they have been doing, unless they can recreate the formula by endless testing of various chemicals to find the magic ingredient.

== Cast ==
- Kenneth Cope as Mike Carter
- Keith Barron as Alan Simpson
- Richard Vernon as Andrew Coombes
- Hilary Pritchard as Diane Simpson
- Philippa Gail as June Carter
- Penny Brahms as Miss Cawfield
- Sandra Bryant as Sue
- Anna Matisse as Erika
- Andrea Allan as model with dog
- Josephine Baxter as girl on train
- Mary Collinson as Janet
- Madeleine Collinson as Martha
- Linda Cunningham as Betty
- Valerie Stanton as Sally
- Me Me Lai as Bride
- Ray Barron as Groom
- Sheila Ruskin as Jackie
- David Garth as Manager
- Bob Todd as car salesman
- William Job as psychiatrist
- Michael Darbyshire as doctor
- Joyce Windsor as cleaner
- Ron Pember as Corporal
- Kenneth Keeling as Jackie's dad
- Hilary Mason as Jackie's mum
- Nancy Gabrielle as perfume tester
- Beryl Cooke as perfume tester
- Jennifer Watts as bunny girl

== Critical reception ==
The Monthly Film Bulletin wrote: "Crude, monotonous and weakly developed comedy, with recurrent sequences of ladies stripping to their underwear padded out with such tasteless and marginally relevant scenes as the hero's visit to a V.D. clinic. A sorry vehicle for TV actor Keith Barron."

Kine Weekly wrote: "The basic idea of this story, a perfume which, in the words of the script, represents 'instant sex' has obvious potential in this permissive age, and it is to the credit and good sense of the production team that pornography has been resisted. The plot does, of course, call for a lot of beautiful young women to start stripping, but it is all dealt with in a very light-hearted, almost ingenuous fashion. In spite of variations on the theme, the one joke does, however, begin to wear a little thin towards the end of 95 minutes. This is not the fault of Keith Barron and Kenneth Cope, who play the two young perfumiers with energy and expertise. Richard Vernon is conventionally comical as the lecher Coombes, and there is a talented supporting cast."
