= What the Swedish Butler Saw =

1975 film by Vernon P. Becker

- Directed by: Vernon P. Becker
- Written by: Vernon P. Becker; Barry E. Downes
- Based on: The Way of a Man with a Maid by Anonymous
- Produced by: Inge Ivarson
- Starring: Ole Søltoft; Sue Longhurst; Malou Cartwright; Diana Dors
- Cinematography: Tony Forsberg
- Edited by: Ingemar Ejve
- Production companies: Film AB Robur; Unicorn Enterprises
- Distributed by: Independent International Pictures
- Release date: February 17, 1975 (Sweden)
- Running time: 73 minutes
- Countries: Sweden; United States
- Language: English

What the Swedish Butler Saw (also known as A Man with a Maid, A Story of... A Man with a Maid, The Groove Room and Champagnegalopp ) is a 1975 Swedish-American sex comedy film directed by Vernon P. Becker and starring Ole Søltoft, Sue Longhurst, Malou Cartwright and Diana Dors. The film was written by Becker and Barry E. Downes loosely based on the 1908 anonymous erotic novel The Way of a Man with a Maid. It was one of a number of sex comedies starring Diana Dors.

== Premise ==
In Victorian London, a young aristocrat, Jack Armstrong, is desperate to win the love of his beloved, the greedy Lady Alice Faversham. Jack buys an insane asylum to turn into a "love nest", unaware that Jack the Ripper still lives there.

== Cast ==
- Sue Longhurst as Alice Faversham
- Ole Søltoft as Jack Armstrong
- Malou Cartwright as Penny
- Diana Dors as Madame Helena
- Charlie Elvegård as Samson
- Martin Young as Jack the Ripper
- Steven Lund as young Jack
- Joe Grey as Judge Pettibone
- Larry Leonard as Mr. Pendleton
- Peter Rose as Reverend Faversham
- Julie Bernby as Mrs. Faversham
- Barbara Hart as Mrs. Armstrong
- Gil Holmes as Mr. Armstrong
- Tina Monell as Marion Faversham

== Production ==
The film was shot in Stereoscopic 3-D at studios in Stockholm with exteriors in Denmark.

== Release ==
During the 3-D revival of the 1980s, the film was re-released under the title Tickled Pink, but the release did keep the Swedish Butler credit sequence intact.

== Reception ==
The Monthly Film Bulletin wrote: "The pornography of the anonymous Victorian novel A Man with a Maid is diluted here into conventional Continental sex comedy, with the repetitive assaults on Alice's virtue now bolstered by a childish sub-plot in which a pantomime Jack the Ripper pops out of secret panels to ogle the nudity. Ole Seltoft performs with a zest that belies years of similarly foolish roles, and even Diana Dors is in remarkably good humour in view of the genuine leg injury which confined her to a wheelchair throughout the shooting. The only real point of interest, however, is that the film was made in another single-lens and projector modification of the 'Natural Vision' 3-D process of the Fifties. This produces an effective enough depth of vision, at the expense of picture clarity, and allows one or two cylindrical objects to protrude from the screen, though there are so few of these that they hardly justify the eyestrain caused by the Polaroid spectacles."

== See also ==
- List of American films of 1975
