= Doctors' Daughters =

Television series

- Genre: Sitcom
- Written by: Richard Gordon; Ralph Thomas
- Directed by: Stuart Allen
- Starring: Victoria Burgoyne; Lesley Duff
- Country of origin: United Kingdom
- Original language: English
- No. of series: 1
- No. of episodes: 6

Production
- Producer: Stuart Allen
- Running time: 30 minutes
- Production company: Associated Television

Original release
- Network: ITV
- Release: 22 February – 29 March 1981

Doctor's Daughters is a British comedy television series that originally aired on ITV in 1981. It was written by Richard Gordon, the creator of the Doctor novel and television series set in medical institutions. In this case, three older doctors are thrown out when they are replaced in their practice by three attractive young female doctors.

== Cast ==
=== Main ===
- Victoria Burgoyne as Dr Fay Liston
- Lesley Duff as Dr. Lucy Drake
- Norman Chappell as Mr. Windows
- Bridget Armstrong as Liz Arkdale
- Bill Fraser as Dr. Freddie Fellows-Smith
- Richard Murdoch as Dr. 'Biggin' Hill
- Jack Watling as Dr. Roland Carmichael

=== Other ===
Other actors who appeared in individual episodes of the series include Nigel Planer, Georgina Moon, Jimmy Logan, Edward Hibbert, Julian Fellowes, Harold Goodwin and Patrick Newell.

== Bibliography ==
- Walker, Craig. On The Buses: The Complete Story. Andrews UK Limited, 2011.
