= Hilary Pritchard =

British actress (1942–1996)

- in The Avengers episode Take-Over (1969)
- Born: 1942; Isle of Man
- Died: 29 July 1996 (aged 53–54); Isle of Man
- Occupation: Film actor
- Years active: 1967–1979

Hilary Pritchard (1942–September 27, 1996) was a Manx stage, film and television actress, who, according to her obituary in The Stage, was "at one time known as the British Goldie Hawn."

== Career ==
She was educated at Douglas High School for Girls in the Isle of Man, and trained as a dancer with Monica Mudie, founder of the Manx Ballet Club. Having completed three years with the Ballet Rambert, she began her acting career in regional rep at Windsor in 1960, followed by similar engagements at Scarborough, Carlisle and York, several of which involved being a choreographer.

On television she became very popular as a performer in the comic mini-sketches included in the BBC consumer programme Braden's Week (1970–72), as well as appearing in such shows as The Avengers (1969), Doctor at Large (1971), Whoops Baghdad (1973), Are You Being Served? (three episodes, 1973–76) and Tropic (six episodes, 1979). She also played Daphne Bentwater from the typing pool and Sir Gregory Pitkin's paramour in the BBC Radio comedy The Men from the Ministry (1973–77).

On stage, she made her West End debut in 1974, playing Frances Hunter in the long-running farce No Sex Please, We're British. Subsequently she appeared in several regional tours, playing opposite Leslie Phillips in To Dorothy, a Son (1976), Trevor Bannister in The Mating Game (1977), Kenneth Connor in Sextet (1978) and Patrick Macnee in The Grass is Greener (1979).

Her film credits included the Ronnie Barker vehicle Futtocks End (1970) and sex comedies like She'll Follow You Anywhere (1971) and Under the Doctor (1976). She was also hired to provide the voice of Princess Yum-Yum in The Thief and the Cobbler, though the decades-long gestation of that project involved her eventually being replaced by Sara Crowe.

She died on Isle of Man on September 27, 1996, aged 53 or 54.

== Filmography ==
=== Film ===
Year	Title	Role	Notes
1970	Futtocks End	The Bird	
1971	She'll Follow You Anywhere	Diane Simpson	AKA, Passion Potion
1974	The Over-Amorous Artist	Bev	AKA, Just One More Time
1974	All I Want Is You... and You... and You...	Freda Donohue	
1976	Under the Doctor	Lady Victoria Stockbridge	
1977	Adventures of a Private Eye	Sally	
1979	A Touch of the Sun	Miss Funnypenny	AKA, No Secrets!

=== Television ===
Year	Title	Role	Notes
1964	Crossroads	Zelda Haye	TV series
1968	The Jazz Age	Mazie	"Broadway"
1968	B and B	Tara Gordon	"Anniversary Schmaltz"
1968	The Old Campaigner	Nanni	"Man of Letters"
1969	The Avengers	Circe	"Take-Over"
1969	As Good Cooks Go	Susan	"A Good Pull Up for Bentleys"
1969	The Very Merry Widow and How	Karen Bergmann	"How to Lose Friends and Not Influence People"
1970	Comedy Playhouse	Ruxton	"Meter Maids"
1970	Department S	Lydia	"Spencer Bodily Is Sixty Years Old"
1970	Fraud Squad	Liz Simms	"Whizz Kid"
1970	Dixon of Dock Green	Cordelia	"Shadows"
1971	Comedy Playhouse	Mary	"Equal Partners"
1971	Doctor at Large	Tanya	"Saturday Matinee"
1971	From a Bird's Eye View	Yvonne	"I Too Was a Novice"
1971	Bachelor Father	Barbara	"Woman About the House"
1972	The Dave Cash Radio Show	Cunitia	"The Dave Cash Comedy Hour", "1.6"
1973	Whoops Baghdad!	Saccharine	TV series
1973	Are You Being Served?	Wealthy Client	"Diamonds Are a Man's Best Friend"
1974	Men of Affairs	Chris	"Silver Threads"
1975	Are You Being Served?	Newlywed Female Customer	"Shoulder to Shoulder"
1976	Are You Being Served?	The Wedding Hat	"No Sale"
1976	Big Boy Now!	Mavis	"Staff Relations"
1979	Tropic	Polly Blossom-Smith	TV series
1981	The Dick Emery Show		"19.6"
