= Victoria Burgoyne =

English actress (born 1953)

- Born: 3 April 1953 (age 72)
- Occupation: Actress
- Known for: Shada; Doctors' Daughters; Howards' Way; Death Ship

Victoria Burgoyne (born 3 April 1953) is an English actress.

She is known for being a guest actress in the famously uncompleted 1979 Doctor Who serial Shada, the making of which was abandoned as the result of a BBC strike. She provided her voice to complete the serial using animation in 2017. Burgoyne was a regular cast member on the series Howards' Way as Vicki Rockwell during its 1989 series.

Other TV credits include: Doctors' Daughters, where she was one of the leads, The Professionals, Give Us a Break and Ever Decreasing Circles.

Her film credits include Mr Smith (1976), Secrets of a Door-to-Door Salesman (1973), Death Ship (1980), Where Is Parsifal? (1984), and a role as a prostitute in the costume drama Stealing Heaven (1988).

== Filmography ==
| Year | Title | Role | Notes |
|---|---|---|---|
| 1973 | Secrets of a Door-to-Door Salesman | Sally Cockburn | |
| 1980 | Death Ship | Lori | |
| 1984 | Where Is Parsifal? | Gabriella Veronica | |
| 1988 | Stealing Heaven | Prostitute | |
| 1989 | Ghosts Can't Do It | Sabine | |
