= Johnny Briggs (actor) =

English actor (1935–2021)

Johnny Briggs MBE
- Born: John Ernest Briggs; 5 September 1935; Battersea, London, England
- Died: 28 February 2021 (aged 85); Sandford, Somerset, England
- Education: Italia Conti Academy of Theatre Arts
- Occupation: Actor
- Years active: 1946–2012
- Known for: Role of Mike Baldwin in Coronation Street (1976–2006)
- Spouses: Carolyne Hover (m. 1961; div. 1975) Christine Allsop (m. 1977; div. 2006)
- Children: 6

John Ernest Briggs (5 September 1935 – 28 February 2021) was an English actor. He was known for his role as Mike Baldwin in the soap opera Coronation Street, in which he appeared from 1976 to 2006.

== Early life ==
Briggs was born in Battersea, south-west London, on 5 September 1935. His father was a master carpenter. He was evacuated from London during the Blitz campaign of World War II. He was awarded a scholarship to train at the Italia Conti Academy when he was 12 years old. There, he learned alongside Millicent Martin, Nanette Newman and Anthony Newley.

== Career ==
One of Briggs' first acting roles was in Quartet (1948), alongside George Cole. Briggs also worked as a stagehand at the Windmill Theatre, before completing two years of national service with the Royal Tank Regiment in Germany.

Upon his return to acting in 1955, Briggs worked in theatre and made his television debut in The Younger Generation with John Thaw. He featured in the police drama No Hiding Place, as well as a few Carry On films. He also had roles in a number of other British shows, including Crossroads, The Saint, The Persuaders! and Thick as Thieves.

In 2005 Briggs announced his intention to leave the role of Mike Baldwin in Coronation Street, citing the hectic filming schedule as the main reason for his departure. After appearing in 2,348 episodes, he filmed his final scenes in the show on 13 March 2006 and they were broadcast on 7 April. Briggs' character (who had been ill with Alzheimer's disease for several months) collapsed and died in the arms of Ken Barlow in the street after suffering a heart attack.

Briggs' last theatre appearance was at the Manchester Opera House in the 2007 pantomime in which he played the father of Cinderella alongside former Coronation Street co-star Tina O'Brien.

Despite suggesting he was to retire from acting after leaving Coronation Street, Briggs made appearances in both Agatha Christie's Marple and Holby City in 2007, as well as the short-lived ITV soap opera Echo Beach in 2008. In 2009, Briggs appeared in the long running daytime soap Doctors. In 2012, he appeared in a Coronation Street sketch to raise money for the charity Text Santa.

== Personal life ==
Briggs had an apartment on the marina in Portishead, Somerset and a house in Florida, United States. He was a keen golfer.

In 2006, Briggs received the Lifetime Achievement Award at the British Soap Awards for his thirty years of contribution to Coronation Street. He was awarded the MBE in the 2007 New Year Honours.

Briggs died peacefully in his sleep on 28 February 2021, at the age of 85. The following day's episode of Coronation Street was dedicated to him.

== Selected filmography ==
- Hue and Cry (1947) – Bit Part (uncredited)
- Oliver Twist (1948) – Undetermined Minor Role (uncredited)
- Quartet (1948) – Boy on Common (segment "The Kite") (uncredited)
- Helter Skelter (1949) – BBC Page Boy (uncredited)
- The Lavender Hill Mob (1951) – Small Role (uncredited)
- The Magic Box (1951) – Youth (uncredited)
- Inspector Morley: Late of Scotland Yard (1952 TV series) - (Delivery Boy) - (episode 1, 'Murder at Scotland Yard', with Dorothy Bramhall)
- Cosh Boy (1953) – Skinny Johnson
- . Sailor Beware (1956) - Sailor (uncredited)
- Second Fiddle (1957) – Jimmy
- The Diplomatic Corpse (1958) – Johnny (Office Boy)
- Sink the Bismarck! (1960) – Young Seaman on Prince of Wales (uncredited)
- Light Up the Sky! (1960) – Leslie Smith
- The Bulldog Breed (1960) – Johnny Nolan
- The Wind of Change (1961) – Frank Marley
- Information Received (1961) – Willis
- H.M.S. Defiant (1962) – Wheatley
- The Wild and the Willing (1962) – Dai Hawkins
- Doctor in Distress (1963) – Medical Student (uncredited)
- A Stitch in Time (1963) – Armed Robber
- The Leather Boys (1964) – Boy Friend
- The Devil-Ship Pirates (1964) – Pablo, a pirate
- 633 Squadron (1964) – Flt Lt Jones
- The Intelligence Men (1965) – Boy in cinema
- Carry On Up the Khyber (1968) – Sporran Soldier (uncredited)
- La ragazza con la pistola (1968) – Brawler (uncredited)
- Some Girls Do (1969) – Air Traffic Controller
- The Last Escape (1970) – Cpl. O'Connell
- Perfect Friday (1970) – Taxi Driver
- Quest for Love (1971) – Club Barman (uncredited)
- Au Pair Girls (1972) – Malcolm
- Bless This House (1972) – Open Truck Driver
- Go for a Take (1972) – Assistant Director (uncredited)
- The Best Pair of Legs in the Business (1973) – Millet
- Secrets of a Door-to-Door Salesman (1973) – Loman
- Man About the House (1974) – Milkman
- Bedtime with Rosie (1974) – Man in Cafe
- Carry On Behind (1975) – Plasterer (uncredited)
- Carry On England (1976) – Melly's Driver
- The Office Party (1976) – Peter
