= Secrets of a Door-to-Door Salesman =

1973 British film by Wolf Rilla

- Theatrical release poster
- Directed by: Wolf Rilla
- Written by: Joseph McGrath; Roy Nicholas
- Produced by: David Grant
- Starring: Brendan Price; Sue Longhurst; Felicity Devonshire; Victoria Burgoyne; Graham Stark
- Music by: John Shakespeare
- Production companies: New Realm Distributors; Oppidan Film Productions
- Release date: 1973
- Running time: 80 minutes
- Country: United Kingdom
- Language: English

Secrets of a Door-to-Door Salesman (U.S. title: Naughty Wives) is a 1973 British sex comedy film directed by Wolf Rilla and starring Brendan Price and Sue Longhurst. It was written by Joseph McGrath and Roy Nicholas.

The film's opening sequence was directed by Jonathan Demme. Demme was originally hired to direct the film, but was replaced by Rilla. In a 2004 interview Demme stated: "I was given one scene to direct, though for some reason I was rejected for the rest of the film. But they kept my scene in the finished movie – it's still there!"

== Plot ==
A young man gets a job as a vacuum salesman and finds that he has to fight off advances from female customers.

== Cast ==
- Brendan Price as David Clyde
- Sue Longhurst as Penny
- Felicity Devonshire as Susanne
- Victoria Burgoyne as Sally Cockburn
- Graham Stark as Charlie Vincent
- Chic Murray as policeman
- Bernard Spear as Jake Tripper
- Jean Harrington as Martina
- Steve Patterson as Anthony Clyde
- Jacqueline Logan as Mrs. Donovan
- Elizabeth Romilly as Nancy
- Jan Servais as Jane
- Jacqueline Afrique as Rachel
- Johnny Briggs as Loman
- Karen Boyes as Girlfriend
- David Rayner as Bruce, the art director
- Ron Alexander as Ron, the assistant
- Noelle Finch as Edith Simons, the reporter
- Mary Millington as traffic warden (as Rebecca Stephens)
- Lesley Roach as singer at discotheque

== Critical reception ==
The Monthly Film Bulletin wrote: "Despite the promise of its credits Secrets of a Door-to-Door Salesman is a sex comedy which achieves the dual feat of being neither erotic nor funny in charting the progress of an innocent abroad in London. Joe McGrath's script lurches from one clichéd situation to another, and leans heavily for its humour on double entendres (really scraping the barrel when plodding through all the possible sexual innuendo to be wrung from the action of a vacuum cleaner), while any gags exhibiting signs of life are swiftly crushed by the actors who with the exception of guest stars Graham Stark and Chic Murray appear to have been selected less for comic talent than for a willingness to remove their clothes at regular intervals. Altogether, the film marks an inauspicious return to feature films by Wolf Rilla, and it is difficult to believe that this feeble romp was directed by the same man who made the imaginative Village of the Damned."
