= Sue Longhurst =

English actress

- Born: 27 January 1943 (age 83); Bognor Regis, England
- Occupation: Actress
- Height: 5 ft 5 in (1.65 m)

Sue Longhurst (born 27 January 1943) is an English actress who appeared in several X-rated sex comedies in the 1970s.

== Personal life ==
Born on 27 January 1943, Longhurst trained at the Royal Academy of Music, and was initially a music teacher, but was soon posing for magazines, record sleeves, book covers and TV commercials, as well as spending 18 months advertising Player's cigarettes.

== Career ==
She made her acting debut, aged 27, in 1971, in Hammer Horror's Lust for a Vampire, playing a schoolgirl at a boarding school. Longhurst also made an appearance in the 1971 film Straw Dogs, as an uncredited stunt double for actress Susan George during the dramatic fire scene. Her second major movie role came in the 1973 production Secrets of a Door-to-Door Salesman, followed by Keep It Up, Jack, directed by Derek Ford.

Longhurst's first film of 1974 was The Over-Amorous Artist, but she also had supporting roles in comedy sketch shows with Dick Emery and Charlie Drake as well as small parts in sitcoms like Please Sir. For a brief time she was also a hostess on ITV gameshow The Golden Shot where she appeared with celebrity guests Barbara Windsor and Sid James, replacing "dizzy" Anne Aston. She also features briefly in the Hylda Baker sitcom Not On Your Nellie (1974), in an episode entitled "The Apartment" in which Baker's character has to stay in the Chelsea flat of a famous model (Longhurst). While Longhurst's character never actually appears in the episode, photos of her (specially taken for the episode) are used as props, and feature heavily in the apartment set.

Her next movie of 1974 was Can You Keep It Up for a Week? in which she played consultant psychiatrist Mrs Bristol. This was followed by Confessions of a Window Cleaner, in which her character takes the virginity of Timmy Lea played by Robin Askwith in a kitchen covered in foam.

In 1975, Longhurst appeared in Girls Come First, the sequel to The Over-Amorous Artist, which also included a then-unknown Hazel O'Connor in the cast. Her second film of that year was the international movie: What the Swedish Butler Saw, (also known as Champagnegalopp or A Man with a Maid or The Groove Room in the United States). In the movie, which is loosely based on the 1908 erotic novel The Way of a Man with a Maid, a young gentleman is desperate to win the love of his beloved, and greedy, Lady Alice Faversham (Longhurst) and forces her to submit to him. She spends much of her screen time in the nude.

In 1976, Longhurst starred as Lady Cockshute in Keep It Up Downstairs, again alongside Diana Dors.

Longhurst's penultimate film, and the biggest hit of her career was the 1977 movie Come Play With Me, directed by George Harrison Marks. Starring alongside Mary Millington and Suzy Mandel, Longhurst had a supporting role as Christina, the girlfriend of an inept gangster, played by comedy actor Ronald Fraser, whose gang is behind an influx of forged notes into the British economy. The movie ran for nearly four years in London's West End. Longhurst's final film was the minor 1979 release Can I Come Too?, which starred an aged Charlie Chester. After a spell of illness, she retired from acting in 1981.

However, in 1996, Longhurst returned to the camera for an interview in David McGillivray's BBC2 tongue-in-cheek documentary Doing Rude Things. Five years later she wrote the foreword to the first edition of Simon Sheridan's acclaimed book on the history of British sex films, Keeping the British End Up. She now lives on the south coast of England.

== Filmography ==
Key
†	Denotes television productions that have not yet been released

Film
Year	Film	Role	Notes
1971	Lust for a Vampire	a schoolgirl	
1973	Secrets of a Door-to-Door Salesman	Penny	
1974	The Over-Amorous Artist	Sue Street	
1974	Keep It Up, Jack	Virginia	
1974	Confessions of a Window Cleaner	Jacqui	
1974	Can You Keep It Up for a Week?	Mrs. Bristol	
1975	What the Swedish Butler Saw	Alice Faversham	
1975	Girls Come First	Sue	
1976	Keep It Up Downstairs	Lady Cockshute	
1977	Come Play with Me	Christina	
1979	Can I Come Too?	Vera	Short film
Television
Year	Title	Role	Notes
1967	The Golden Shot	Hostess (1974)	
1972	The Fenn Street Gang		Uncredited, episode: That Sort of Girl
1975	The Good Old Days	Self - Assistant to Ray Alan	episode: #23.6
1995	Doing Rude Things	Self - Interviewee	
TBA †	X †	Self - Interviewee	Post-production
Stunts
Year	Title	Role	Notes
1968	Assignment K	Camilla Sparv's stunt double	Uncredited
1971	Straw Dogs	Susan George's stunt double	Uncredited
