= David Whitaker (composer) =

English composer and arranger (1931-2012)

- Also known as: David Whittaker
- Born: David Sinclair Whitaker; 6 January 1931; Surrey, England
- Died: 11 January 2012 (aged 81) Oxfordshire, England
- Occupation(s): Composer, songwriter, arranger, conductor
- Years active: 1968–2011

David Sinclair Whitaker (6 January 1931 – 11 January 2012) was an English composer, songwriter, arranger, and conductor who was most active in the 1960s and 1970s.

== Musical works ==
Whitaker, who was born in Kingston upon Thames, collaborated with many prestigious British and French artists including Air, Etienne Daho, Marianne Faithfull, Claude François, Serge Gainsbourg, France Gall, Johnny Hallyday, the Rolling Stones, Jimmy Page (for the soundtrack to Death Wish II), Saint Etienne, Simply Red and Sylvie Vartan, and other international artists including Lee Hazlewood, Kings of Convenience and Francesco De Gregori.

Arguably Whitaker's best known work from his 1960s career as a session arranger and orchestrator is his distinctive arrangement for the 1966 version of The Rolling Stones' "The Last Time", written for the instrumental album The Rolling Stones Songbook, and credited to a session group dubbed The Andrew Oldham Orchestra. In 1997 a major controversy erupted surrounding the use of samples from that version of "The Last Time" in the song "Bitter Sweet Symphony" by UK band "The Verve", which drew international attention. In the resulting dispute, Verve frontman and songwriter Richard Ashcroft was forced to surrender the copyright to and all earnings from "Bitter Sweet Symphony" to the American company ABKCO, controlled by former Stones manager Allen Klein, and it would be another twenty years before Ashcroft's management was able to negotiate a settlement with ABKCO, Mick Jagger and Keith Richards, which saw the rights revert back to Ashcroft. In the meantime, it was estimated that The Verve track had earned US$5 million in publishing revenue alone, and Ashcroft publicly claimed that surrendering his song had cost him $50 million.

Whitaker recorded several sessions with the BBC Radio Orchestra at the Maida Vale Studios, London, in the early 1980s, featuring a mixture of his own compositions and arrangements, to high acclaim.

In 1992, David Whitaker (along with Adrian Burch), arranged and produced a recording of the Buddy Holly hit "Heartbeat" with vocals performed by actor/singer Nick Berry. It was to be used as the title theme for popular ITV drama series Heartbeat, which also starred Berry. The single was released in 1992 and reached number 2 on the U.K. chart. It was used on every episode of the series until its cancellation in 2010. David and Adrian also composed incidental music for many episodes, although with an increase in the number of episodes produced per year and the reduction in production time per episode, episodes later began to be heavily scored with sections of 1960s pop songs.

Alongside his other collaborations, David Whitaker recorded many interpretations of songs for albums released by Reader's Digest. They were usually credited to David Whitaker And His Orchestra.

=== Work with Shel Talmy ===
Shel Talmy was a major record producer with whom Whitaker collaborated. Talmy used Whitaker as arranger and orchestra leader extensively on his sessions from 1965 through to the 1970s, which included singles released on Talmy's Planet label.

Talmy produced Music To Spy By, the 1966 David Whitaker Orchestra album for CBS, composed of Whitaker originals.

He also produced the albums And A Touch of Love by Bill Davies, and The Revolutionary Piano of Nicky Hopkins, for which Whitaker did the arrangements.

Whitaker was also the arranger on the Talmy-produced fortieth birthday by Lee Hazlewood, Forty.

Talmy was also involved with several of the film soundtracks that Whitaker composed, and was the musical director on the film, Scream And Scream Again, starring Vincent Price and Christopher Lee.

== Selected film scores ==
- 1968: Hammerhead, directed by David Miller, starring Vince Edwards
- 1968: Don't Raise the Bridge, Lower the River, directed by Jerry Paris, starring Jerry Lewis
- 1969: The Desperados, directed by Henry Levin, starring Jack Palance
- 1969: Run Wild, Run Free, directed by Richard C. Sarafian, starring John Mills
- 1970: Scream and Scream Again, directed by Gordon Hessler, starring Vincent Price, Christopher Lee
- 1970: Eyewitness, directed by John Hough, starring Mark Lester, Susan George
- 1971: Dr. Jekyll and Sister Hyde, directed by Roy Ward Baker, starring Ralph Bates, Martine Beswick
- 1972: Vampire Circus, directed by Robert Young, starring Adrienne Corri
- 1972: That's Your Funeral, directed by John Robins, starring Bill Fraser
- 1972: Danny Jones, directed by Jules Bricken, starring Frank Finlay
- 1974: Vampira, directed by Clive Donner, starring David Niven, Teresa Graves
- 1974: Mistress Pamela, directed by Jim O'Connolly, starring Ann Michelle
- 1978: The Playbirds, directed by Willy Roe, starring Mary Millington
- 1978: Dominique, directed by Michael Anderson, starring Cliff Robertson, Jean Simmons
- 1979: Confessions from the David Galaxy Affair, directed by Willy Roe, starring Alan Lake, Mary Millington
- 1982: The Sword and the Sorcerer, directed by Albert Pyun, starring Lee Horsley, Kathleen Beller
- 1998: Shadow Run, directed by Geoffrey Reeve, starring Michael Caine, James Fox
- 2000: With a Friend Like Harry (Harry, un ami qui vous veut du bien), directed by Dominik Moll, starring Sergi López
- 2006: Lemming, directed by Dominik Moll, starring Charlotte Rampling, Charlotte Gainsbourg

== Discography ==
=== Compilation ===
- 2002: The David Whitaker Songbook, 1 CD Collection "Musée de l’Imaginaire", Album 20 Tricatel – Compiled by Thomas Jamois and Bertrand Burgalat with the help of David Whitaker (all selections arranged and conducted by David Sinclair Whitaker), track listing:
1. The Andrew Oldham Orchestra
  The Last Time
  (Mick Jagger, Keith Richards) Westminster Music / ABKCO Music, Inc. (BMI)
  (P) 1967 Immediate Records, lnc
2. Long Chris
  La Petite fille de l’hiver
  (Éric Demarsan, Long Chris) Ed. Tulsa
  (P) 1967 Philips
3. OST Run Wild, Run Free
  Philip’s Triumph
  (David Whitaker) Screen Gems-Columbia, BMI
  (P) 1969 SGC
4. Music To Spy By
  Strange Affair
  (David Whitaker)
  (P) 1965 CBS
5. Nico
  I‘m Not Saying
  (Gordon Lightfoot) Chelsea Music Publishing
  (P) 1965 Andrew Loog Oldham Production
6. Music to spy by
  Alive at Last
  (David Whitaker)
  (P) 1965 CBS
7. OST Run Wild, Run Free
  A Ride on the White Colt
  (David Whitaker) Screen Gems-Columbia, BMI
  (P) 1969 SGC
8. Lee Hazlewood
  What’s More I Don’t Need Her
  (Lee Hazlewood) Lee Hazlewood Music, Corp
  (P) 1970 Lee Hazlewood Music, Corp
9. David Whitaker
  Pavane
  (David Whitaker)
  (P) 1974 Reserved rights
10. David Whitaker
  Susie
  (David Whitaker)
  (P) 1974 Reserved rights
11. OST Run Wild, Run Free
  Philip on the Moors
  (David Whitaker) Screen Gems-Columbia, BMI
  (P) 1969 SGC
12. OST Run Wild, Run Free
  Philip Grows Up
  (David Whitaker) Screen Gems-Columbia, BMI
  (P) 1969 SGC
13. OST Hammerhead
  Hood Explore The Triton
  (David Whitaker) Screen Gems-Columbia, BMI
  (P) 1968 Colgems Records, lnc
14. Music To Spy By
  Interception
  (David Whitaker)
  (P) 1965 SGC
15. France Gall
  Chanson Indienne (Indian Song)
  (lyrics: Robert Gall; music: David Whitaker) Ed. Sidonie
  (P) 1968 Philips
16. OST Harry un ami qui vous veut du bien
  L’Autoroute des vacances
  (David Whitaker) Ed. Diaphana / BMG Music Pub.
  (P) 2000 Diaphana / Source
17. Marianne Faithfull
  Plaisir d'Amour
  (Public domain)
  (P) 1965 Andrew Loog Oldham Production
18. Music To Spy By
  Cressida
  (David Whitaker)
  (P) 1965 SGC
19. Music To Spy By
  Mr Mouthpiece
  (David Whitaker)
  (P) 1965 SGC
20. Air
  Remember (David Whitaker version)
  (Nicolas Godin, Jean-Benoît Dunckel) Ed. Revolvair
  (P) 1998 Source
21. David Whitaker
  Dominique
  (David Whitaker)
  (P) 1973 Reserved rights

== Awards ==
- David Whitaker, nominated in 2001 for the César Award for Best Music Written for a Film with the French movie With a Friend Like Harry (Harry, un ami qui vous veut du bien) directed by Dominik Moll.

== Death ==
Whitaker died on 11 January 2012.
