= Harrison Marks =

English figure photographer (1926–1997)

George Harrison Marks
- Marks in Come Play with Me (1977)
- Born: George Harrison Marks; 6 August 1926; Tottenham, Middlesex, England
- Died: 27 June 1997 (aged 70); Camden, London, England
- Spouse(s): Diana Bugsgang (1951–19??) "Vivienne Warren" (1963–19??); Toni Burnet (1973–19??)
- Partner: Pamela Green (1953–1961)
- Children: Josie Harrison Marks

George Harrison Marks (6 August 1926 – 27 June 1997) was an English glamour photographer and director of nudist, and later, pornographic films.

== Personal life ==
Born in Tottenham, Middlesex in 1926 to a Jewish family, Marks was 17 when he married his first wife, Diana Bugsgang. He worked as a stand-up comedian in variety halls towards the end of the music hall era, in the late 1940s and early 1950s, in a duo called Harrison and Stuart. Marks left the act in 1951 to develop his photographic career, taking pictures of music-hall performers and showgirls. The model and actress Pamela Green was performing as a dancer in a 1952 revue called Paris to Piccadilly, a version of the Folies Bergère in London. She became Marks' lover and began working with him as a model. Their relationship ended in 1961. During the 1960s Marks had a relationship with another of his models, June Palmer, and he married his second wife Vivienne Warren in 1964.

While he was filming The Naked World of Harrison Marks he began a relationship with Toni Burnett, an actress and model who made a brief appearance in the film. In 1967, the year the film came out, Marks and Burnett had a daughter, Josie Harrison Marks. Marks' and Green's business partnership was dissolved in the same year, and in 1970 Marks was bankrupt.

In 1971 he was tried at the Old Bailey for dealing in pornography by post. Marks and Burnett married in September 1973, but they split up around 1978. In 1979 Marks began a relationship with Louise Sinclair, a teenage glamour model.

== Glamour photography ==
In the 1950s Marks and Pamela Green opened a photographic studio at 4 Gerrard Street, Soho. Marks provided nude photographs for photographic magazines on a freelance basis as well as selling his own stills directly. With the profits from this work, they launched Kamera magazine in 1957. Kamera featured Marks' glamour photography of nude women taken in the small studios or Marks' kitchen. June Palmer began modelling professionally for Marks in the late 1950s and became one of his most famous models. Marks' 1958 publicity materials contained one of the first uses of the word "glamour" as a euphemism for nude modelling/photography. The magazine was an immediate success and the business expanded to employ around seventeen staff by the early 1960s, selling a number of other magazine titles such as Solo, postcards and calendars, and distributing imported French books and glamour magazines. Photographic exhibitions were held at the Gerrard Street studio.

Marks was also the photographic consultant for the film Peeping Tom (1960), which featured Green in a cameo role. In the 1960s Marks moved his studio to Saffron Hill near King's Cross Station and began selling photoshoots to the American magazine Swank. His Kamera and Solo magazines ceased publication in 1968, with occasional single-issue magazines appearing subsequently.

In later years he supplied photographs to the men's magazines Men Only and Lilliput, and sold photosets to David Sullivan's magazines Ladybirds and Whitehouse.

== Films ==
In 1958, as an offshoot of his magazines, Marks began making short films of his models undressing and posing topless, for the 8 mm film market. These were popularly known as "glamour home movies". His films were available over the counter at camera shops, and also supplied discreetly by mail order from the back pages of his Kamera magazine. One Marks 8mm glamour film was The Window Dresser (1961), in which Pamela Green starred as a cat burglar who hides from the law by posing as a display mannequin in a lingerie shop. Marks appears in the film as the shop's owner; Green performs a striptease in the store's display window. Clips from The Window Dresser were used in a 1964 piece on the glamour film scene in the Rediffusion programme This Week. These clips showed Pamela Green fully unclothed; the ensuing controversy resulted in Green having to defend the film on the BBC Light Programme's Woman's Hour. After a judge threw out an obscenity charge against The Window Dresser, Marks continued to make 8 mm glamour films throughout the 1960s.

One such film, Witches Brew (1960) features Pamela Green as a witch casting spells; Marks makes a brief appearance as her hunchback assistant. In another, Model Entry (1965), a cat burglar breaks into Marks' studio, strips and leaves him her address. In Danger Girl, a stripping secret agent is put into bondage by a Russian spy; the agent breaks free, ultimately throwing her captor onto a circular saw. Even more macabre is Marks' Perchance to Scream (1967) in which a model is transported to a medieval torture chamber. In this film, Stuart Samuels plays an evil inquisitor who sentences topless women to be whipped and beheaded by a masked executioner.

His feature films as a director were Naked - As Nature Intended (1961), The Chimney Sweeps (his only non-sex feature, 1963), The Naked World of Harrison Marks (1967), Pattern of Evil (1967), The Nine Ages of Nakedness (1969) and Come Play With Me (1977), which featured Mary Millington. Pattern of Evil a.k.a. Fornicon, a heavy S&M film which features scenes of murder and whipping in a torture chamber, was never shown in the UK. Marks implied in several interviews over the years that the film was financed by organised crime.

After directing The Nine Ages of Nakedness, Marks endured a particularly turbulent time in the early seventies including bankruptcy (1970), an obscenity trial at the Old Bailey in 1971, and alcoholism. Ironically, a segment of The Nine Ages of Nakedness had ended with Marks' alter-ego "The Great Marko" being brought up before a crooked Judge (Cardew Robinson) on obscenity charges. Marks made ends meet during this period by continuing to shoot short films for the 8mm market and releasing them via his Maximus Films company.

Based at Marks' Farringdon studio, Maximus was run on a "film club" basis, meaning that clients would have to sign up for membership before purchasing the films, mirroring the way membership-only sex cinemas were run at the time. While his earlier 8mm films largely consisted of nothing more explicit than the models posing topless, late-sixties titles like Apartment 69 and The Amorous Masseur were generally softcore pornography. Marks had been eager to shoot soft porn material ever since the Window Dresser case, much to the disdain of Pamela Green, who dissolved their business partnership in 1967. "He was fond of good living and a drink or two, and he wanted to go on to soft porn," Green told Tit-Bits magazine in 1995, adding "there was this one film where he was dressed as a dirty old man and he's creeping round Piccadilly Circus, then you see him in bed with this girl". One Maximus short The Ecstasy of Oral Love adopts a pseudo-documentary format, showing a couple frantically licking each other, ending with some relatively graphic oral sex scenes which are inter-cut with ostensibly socially redeeming title cards issuing advice to "young married couples".

In the mid seventies Marks had begun selling explicit photo sets to adult magazine publisher David Sullivan's top-shelf magazines. Evidently Marks had also sold Sullivan the rights to some of his 8mm sex films, as adverts by Kelerfern (a Sullivan mail order company) carried Marks-directed sex shorts like Hole in One, Nymphomania, King Muff and Doctor Sex for sale around this period.

While the Marks films offered in UK porn magazines throughout the 1970s appear to have been softcore, and their pornographic nature greatly exaggerated by the advertisements (a familiar trait of David Sullivan), from the early 1970s onwards Marks had begun experimenting with hardcore production. He made short films for a British hardcore pornographer known only as "Charlie Brown", and began making hardcore versions of his own Maximus short films which were released overseas on the Color Climax and Tabu labels. In later years Marks was reluctant to discuss these hardcore short films and claimed "not to remember" their names. Arabian Knights (also filmed for Color Climax in 1979) was shot at the Hotel Julius Caesar in Queens Gardens in Bayswater and features mainstream actor Milton Reid in a non-sex role.

== Other works ==
A lover of animals, in particular felines, in the early stages of his career Marks had a sideline photographing cats, and provided the photographs for Compton Mackenzie's book Cats's Company (1960).

"He was an excellent photographer of nudes," producer Tony Tenser remarked to John Hamilton in a 1998 interview, "but he also excelled in photographs of cats, that were much more beautiful than some of his nudes". Marks' cats remained a fixture of his studio and can be spotted scurrying about in several of the 8mm glamour films of the period, occasionally even appearing in prominent roles.

In the wake of the success of his early "glamour" films Harrison Marks also produced a series of slapstick comedies also sold via the photographic shops and magazines that were the outlet for his adult work. As well as directing these films he also appeared as one of the main actors. Titles like Uncle's Tea Party, Defective Detectives, High Diddle Fiddle, Dizzy Decorators and Musical Maniacs were founded in the music hall and classic silent comedy traditions. Needless to say, they were less successful than his girlie films and the competition from the real thing (i.e., the Chaplin, Keaton, and Harold Lloyd classics that he paid homage to), which provided most of the package film releases of the day.

=== Janus and Kane ===
In the late 1970s Marks was hired as a photographer for Janus, a fetish magazine specialising in spanking and caning imagery. He also produced and directed short erotic corporal punishment films for Janus for the then-emerging home video market. One of these, Warden's End (1981), starring glamour model and pornographic actress Linzi Drew, shows the exterior and interior of Janus's London storefront office at 40 Old Compton Street.

In 1982 Marks left the Janus stable to set up his own fetish magazine Kane which also featured caning and spanking photos. Kane described itself as "The CP Journal of Fantasy, Fact and Fiction for Adults."

Corporal punishment would now become Marks' big theme for the final act of his career. According to his official website, Marks' corporal punishment material "kept him in booze and cigarettes and an acceptable degree of comfort for the rest of his life". He created the Kane International Videos division and went on to direct (and sometimes also performed in) a number of full-length corporal punishment videos in the 1980s and 1990s. Some of his videos include: The Cane and Mr Abel (1984), also with Linzi Drew, Bad Girls Don’t Cry (1989), The Spanking Academy of Dr. Blunt, Stinging Tales (both 1992), Naughty Schoolgirls Revenge (1994), and Spanker's Paradise (parts 1 & 2) in 1992 in which he also acted opposite English porn star Vida Garman.

After his death in 1997, his daughter Josie Harrison Marks took over the editing of Kane.

== Biography ==
In 1967 Franklyn Wood, a former art editor of The Times and the first editor in Fleet Street to run a diary (in the Daily Sketch) under his own name, published a biography of Harrison Marks called The Naked Truth About Harrison Marks. It was reprinted in 2017.

== See also ==
- Russell Gay
- Pornography in the United Kingdom

== Sources ==
- Sheridan, Simon (2011). Keeping the British End Up: Four Decades of Saucy Cinema. Titan Books. ISBN 9780857682796.
- Wood, Franklyn (2017). The Naked Truth About Harrison Marks. Wolfbait Books. ISBN 9781999744106.
