= Emmanuelle in Soho =

1981British film by David Hughes

- Directed by: David Hughes
- Screenplay by: Brian Daly; John M. East
- Produced by: John M. East
- Cinematography: Don Lord
- Edited by: David Woodward
- Music by: Barry Kirsch
- Production company: Roldvale
- Distributed by: Tigon
- Release date: 1981
- Running time: 67 minutes
- Country: United Kingdom

Emmanuelle in Soho is a 1981 British sex film directed by David Hughes and produced by David Sullivan, and starring Angie Quick (under the name 'Mandy Miller'), Julie Lee and John M. East. Sullivan had originally intended Mary Millington to star in the film.

== Plot ==
Half-Chinese Kate Benson (played by Lee) and her photographer husband Paul (Kevin Fraser) share their Bayswater home with a nymphomaniac stripper, Emmanuelle. The two women attempt to find work in the sex industry in London's Soho district, and get mixed up with a sleazy and unscrupulous theatrical agent, Bill Anderson.

== Cast ==
- Angie Quick as Emmanuelle of Soho
- Julie Lee as Kate Benson
- John M. East as Bill Anderson
- Kevin Fraser as Paul Benson
- Gavin Clare as Mr. Cole
- Timothy Blackstone as Derek
- Geraldine Hooper as Jill
- Anita Desmarais as Sheila Burnette
- Georges Waser as Tom Poluski
- Erika Lea as Judy
- Kathy Green as Sammy
- Suzanne Richens as a Showgirl
- John Roach as Albert

== Release ==
The film premiered in Sheffield and transferred to London where it ran for 10 weeks at the Eros cinema on Piccadilly Circus followed by 25 weeks at the Moulin in Great Windmill Street. There is also a hardcore version of this film - such a version was released in Hong Kong cinemas where it ran for nearly three years. The US release included a 6-minute mini-documentary prologue about the sex industry in Soho.

== Reception ==
Emmanuelle in Soho was one of the last British softcore films to receive a theatrical release before the abolition of the Eady Levy and the growth of home video led to the virtual disappearance of British low-budget exploitation film-making. In a contemporary review, the Monthly Film Bulletin described the film as "of marginal interest for its unabashed portrait of the neighbourhood's tawdry illicit wares". The review noted that the "slipshod scripting is about par for the course".

== See also ==
- Emmanuelle – 1974 pornographic French film
- Pornography in the United Kingdom
- The Playbirds – 1978 Sullivan film starring Millington, also partly set in Soho
