= Howard Nelson (actor) =

British actor (1934–2007)

Howard "Vanderhorn" Nelson (1934 – 7 December 2007) was an ex-champion bodybuilder who also acted in many British sex comedies. Cast both in comedy roles and as "heavies" due to his muscular appearance, Nelson's most regular employer was close personal friend Harrison Marks. For many years Nelson worked in Marks' studio in Farringdon. As well as being a regular in Marks' softcore films (The Nine Ages of Nakedness, Come Play With Me), Nelson also appeared in several of Marks' 8mm glamour films. Nelson also made several non-sexual appearances in various blue films made by Marks, usually wearing elaborate disguises such as dark glasses and/or a blonde wig. In 1978 he appeared on the cover of Forum magazine (Vol.10, No.11). He also featured as a "spanking milkman" in the second issue of New Janus (circa 1982), a corporal punishment magazine that Marks edited.

Latterly, Howard worked for a time at Lovejoy’s Bookshop, and was occasionally spotted around the Charing Cross area. He died of natural causes at his South London home in December 2007, in February 2009 the Metropolitan Police launched an appeal to find any of his surviving relatives.

== Partial filmography ==
- Pattern of Evil (1967)....Arthur Vanderhorn
- Macabre (8mm glamour short, filmed September 1968)
- The Nine Ages of Nakedness (1969) - Sir Rupert (segment "The Cavaliers")
- Secrets of Sex (1969).... Judge's Servant (uncredited)
- The Girl Upstairs (8mm glamour short, 1972, Dir: Harrison Marks)
- Intimacy (8mm glamour short, 197?, Dir: Ken Williams)
- The Handyman (8mm glamour short, 197?, Dir: Ken Williams)
- Landlord's Delight (8mm glamour short, 197?)
- Just the Job (8mm glamour short, 197?..... Bob, Dir: Ken Williams)
- Maid to Satisfy (8mm glamour short, 197?)
- Pleasure Maid (8mm glamour short, 197?, Dir: Ken Williams)
- Unaccustomed as I Am (8mm glamour short, 1973, Dir: Harrison Marks)
- Die Lollos a.k.a. The Customs (hardcore short 197?) .... Man at Customs Desk
- Autograph Hunter (hardcore short 197?) .... Roadie
- Duty Free (hardcore short 197?) ... Man at Customs Desk
- The Swordsman (1974) ...Thug in Gym
- Come Play with Me (1977) ....Mr. Benjamin
- The Playbirds (1978) ... Caped Man
- The Stud (1978) ...Sandro
- Carry On Emmannuelle (1979) -.... Harry Hernia
- Emmanuelle and Friends (Ken Williams compilation video, released 1980) .... Big Mick the Handyman
- Minder (1993) "No Way to treat a Daley"....Boxer (uncredited)
