= The Playbirds =

1978 British film by Willy Roe

- Directed by: Willy Roe
- Written by: Willy Roe
- Produced by: David Sullivan
- Starring: Mary Millington; Alan Lake; Glynn Edwards; Suzy Mandel; Kenny Lynch
- Music by: David Whitaker
- Production company: Roldvale
- Distributed by: Tigon Film Distributors
- Release date: 6 July 1978
- Running time: 94 minutes
- Country: United Kingdom
- Language: English
- Budget: £120,000

The Playbirds (also known as David Sullivan's The Playbirds, The Playbird Murders, and Secrets of a Playgirl) is a 1978 British sexploitation film directed by Willy Roe and starring Mary Millington, Glynn Edwards, Suzy Mandel and Windsor Davies. It was the official follow-up to Come Play with Me (1977), one of the most successful of the British sex comedies of the 1970s, which also starred Millington.

== Plot ==
In London, an unidentified serial killer targets female models, strangling each woman and marking the forehead with the number of the victim. Scotland Yard detectives Jack Holbourne and Harry Morgan are assigned to investigate and discover that all of the women had recently appeared in the pornographic magazine Playbirds [a real magazine, published by producer Sullivan]. Four suspects are identified: the magazine's publisher, Harry Dougan; photographer Terry Day; a street preacher called Hern; and anti-pornography campaigner George Ransome MP. Dougan and Day are quickly discounted. Lena Cunningham, Playbirds' next star model, is given round-the-clock police protection, but the killer takes advantage of a brief security lapse to enter her flat and murder her in the living room, thus claiming his fifth victim.

To draw out the killer, Holbourne and Morgan decide to send in an undercover policewoman posing as an up-and-coming Playbirds model. Following "auditions" at the Yard, in which female officers volunteering for the role are asked to perform striptease, Holbourne and Morgan recruit Sergeant Lucy Sheridan, who takes a job at a massage parlour to set up her introduction to Dougan. Ransome, who secretly enjoys pornography that he obtains from Day, is spotted looking through the window at a house party being hosted by Dougan and some of the models. Suspecting him to be the killer, police move to arrest him, but he flees and in the ensuing police chase nearly drowns in a pond and is taken to hospital. After Hern is found to have spied on the models during a photo shoot, Holbourne and Morgan decide that he is now their chief suspect for the murders, and he is arrested and taken in for further questioning.

After Sheridan learns of this by phone, a man who appears to be Hern breaks into her flat and strangles her in her bathtub, while telling her that he is Hern's twin brother.

== Cast ==
- Mary Millington as WPC Lucy Sheridan
- Alan Lake as Harry Dougan
- Glynn Edwards as Inspector Holbourne
- Derren Nesbitt as Jeremy
- Suzy Mandel as Lena
- Windsor Davies as Assistant Police Commissioner
- Penny Spencer as WPC Andrews
- Gavin Campbell as Inspector Harry Morgan
- Kenny Lynch as police doctor
- Sandra Dorne as Dougan's secretary
- Dudley Sutton as Hern
- Alec Mango as Ransome
- Pat Astley as Doreen
- Ballard Berkeley as Trainer
- Michael Gradwell as Terry Day
- Anthony Kenyon as Dolby
- Ron Flangan as Wilson
- John M. East as reporter
- André Trottier as Kenny
- Gordon Salkilld as police photographer
- Nigel Gregory as expert 1
- Tom McCabe as expert 2
- Pat Gorman as expert 3
- Susie Silvey as WPC Taylor
- Cosey Fanni Tutti as extra (uncredited)
- Howard Nelson as caped man (uncredited)
- Tony Scannell as man at depot (uncredited)

== Production ==
Filmed over four weeks in December 1977 and January 1978, The Playbirds was the official follow-up to Come Play with Me, which also starred Mary Millington. In The Playbirds, Millington plays an undercover policewoman investigating the murders of models from David Sullivan's magazine Playbirds. The title sequence shows Millington walking through Soho when it was at the height of its domination by the sex industry, giving a visual record of the district's history. Millington collaborated with director Willy Roe on two further sexploitation pictures, Confessions from the David Galaxy Affair (1979) and Queen of the Blues (1979).

== Release and reception ==
The film ran in London for 34 consecutive weeks and took £177,000.

In a contemporary review for The Monthly Film Bulletin, Clyde Jeavons summed up the film as "standard British sex fare thinly disguised as a police thriller of the old Scotland Yard variety". On the performances, he commented that Millington "speaks her lines as methodically as she strips, while one or two good actors like Glynn Edwards stand around looking suitably shamefaced." Films Illustrated said that despite the film's sexual content, it resembled "an old-time British second feature transplanted to the '70s".

In a 2022 review, Eddie Harrison (a contributor to The List) gave The Playbirds zero stars, characterising it as "grubby, bottom-rung British sexploitation" with a "sub-Giallo plot" and supporting cast made up of "slumming British comedy stars". He condemned the film's "deeply misogynist" tone, noting that while the striptease scenes "[objectify] women in the crudest possible way", the audience is drawn into a series of "vicarious 'thrills' as the same women are hunted down and brutally murdered".

== Special-edition DVD / Blu Ray ==
The Playbirds was released on DVD in the United Kingdom on 9 August 2010 by Odeon Entertainment. The film has been digitally remastered and the disc features an extensive stills gallery, production notes written by historian Simon Sheridan, plus Mary Millington's World Striptease Extravaganza (1981) and Response, a short lesbian film starring Mary Millington, made in 1974. The film was released on Blu Ray in 2020 as part of the Mary Millington Movie Collection. The Blu Ray was released by Screenbound Pictures and has audio commentary by Simon Sheridan and Willy Roe.

== See also ==
- Emmanuelle in Soho
- Pornography in the United Kingdom
