= Milton Reid =

British-Indian actor (1917– c.1987)

- Reid in Captain Clegg (1962).
- Born: Milton Rutherford Reid; 29 April 1917; Bombay, British India (present-day Mumbai, India)
- Died: 1987 (aged 69–70); Bengaluru, Karnataka, India
- Years active: 1958–1982
- Spouse: Bertha Lilian Guyett (1939–?)
- Professional wrestling career
- Ring names: Jungle Boy; The Mighty Chang

Milton Gaylord Reid (born Milton Rutherford Reid; 29 April 1917 – c. 1987) was an Anglo-Indian actor and professional wrestler. He had a lengthy career as a character actor in British films and television, usually playing thugs and other supporting villains.

== Biography ==
=== Early life ===
Reid was born and raised in Bombay in 1917, the son of a Scottish Customs and Excise inspector and an Indian woman. His distinctive appearance was due to Noonan syndrome. He moved to London in 1936, and served in the Army during World War II. As a soldier, he made his film debut as an extra in The Way Ahead (1944).

=== Wrestling career ===
After being discharged, Reid’s large stature and intimidating appearance saw him take up a career as a professional wrestler, using the ring names Jungle Boy and The Mighty Chang, fighting Bert Assirati. The former ringname was later adopted by American wrestler Jack Perry; the latter by 1980’s British wrestler Crusher Mason.

=== Film career ===
Reid appeared in over 53 films and television programmes from 1953 to 1979.

As an actor, Reid was known for playing thugs, henchmen and brutes, typified by his role as Yen in the film Ferry to Hong Kong (1959) that starred Curd Jürgens and Orson Welles. He played the big pirate in Swiss Family Robinson (1960) and had a memorable role as the mute Mulatto in the Hammer film Captain Clegg (1962). Reid appeared in three James Bond films: as Dr. No's Guard in Dr. No (1962), as a temple guard in Casino Royale (1967), and as Sandor, Roger Moore's opponent in a roof top fight in The Spy Who Loved Me (1977). Reid also appeared as a henchman in the 1967 Bulldog Drummond film Deadlier Than the Male and as Eye Patch in the 1977 Bond spoof No. 1 of the Secret Service.

Reid attempted to secure the role of Oddjob in Goldfinger (1964). He challenged fellow professional wrestler Harold "Tosh Togo" Sakata to a shoot fight; the outcome of which would determine who would get the role. As Reid had already appeared in Dr. No, the producers decided to go with Sakata, and the match did not take place, though Reid's later Bond character of Sandor was Oddjob-esque.

He appeared briefly as a circus strongman in The Rolling Stones Rock and Roll Circus, which was filmed in 1968 but delayed for release until 1996. In the early 1970s he appeared as a bodyguard in a TV commercial for St Bruno pipe tobacco, a role which he reprised in a spoof advert for "Butch" tobacco in Kitten Kong, an episode of the BBC series The Goodies. Reid also appeared in a handful of cult horror movies including Dr. Phibes Rises Again and Terror, fantasy/adventure films such as The People That Time Forgot and Arabian Adventure, and several British sex films such as Come Play with Me and Adventures of a Private Eye.

He was friends with pornographic actress Mary Millington, after the two appeared together in Come Play with Me. He accepted non-sexual roles in a several of hardcore porn films starring Millington, including Arabian Knights, shot in London in 1979 and released by Color Climax.

=== Later life and disappearance ===
Reid’s association with Millington and his appearance in pornographic films hurt his mainstream acting career, particularly after a scathing article published in the Sunday People. Largely ostracised by the British film industry, Reid returned to India in 1980 to try his hand at Bollywood cinema, reuniting with his mother and sister in Bangalore, while leaving his wife Bertha behind in England. In 1981, he was arrested for trespassing and damaging property on his neighbour’s flat.

Reid supposedly died of a heart attack in Bengaluru in 1987, his son was still receiving written correspondence from him in 1986. His death is something of a mystery due to the conflicting dates of death and also because he died in relative obscurity in India.

The year of Reid's death 1987, wrestler Brian Allan "Crusher" Mason (1945-2000) used the Mighty Chang name on ITV. Mason also appeared as Mighty Chang for S4C's Reslo wrestling show.

== Filmography ==
- Undercover Girl (1958) – Mac, thug with beard
- The Camp on Blood Island (1958) – Japanese Executioner (uncredited)
- Blood of the Vampire (1958) – Executioner
- Ferry to Hong Kong (1959) – Yen, Sing-Up's Partner
- Swiss Family Robinson (1960) – Big Pirate
- The Terror of the Tongs (1961) – Guardian (uncredited)
- Visa to Canton (1961) – Bodyguard
- The Wonders of Aladdin (1961) – Omar
- Captain Clegg (1962) – Mulatto
- Dr. No (1962) – Dr.No's Guard (uncredited)
- Panic (1963) – Dan
- 55 Days at Peking (1963) – Boxer (uncredited)
- The Ten Gladiators (1963) – Baldhead Wrestler
- A Stitch in Time (1963) – The Mighty Chang in Photograph (uncredited)
- Desperate Mission (1965) – To-go
- Deadlier Than the Male (1967) – Chang
- Casino Royale (1967) – Temple Guard (uncredited)
- Berserk! (1967) – Strong Man
- The Mini-Affair (1968) – Fisherman
- Great Catherine (1968) – Henchman (uncredited)
- The Assassination Bureau (1969) – Elevator victim Leonardi (uncredited)
- Target: Harry (1969) – Kemal
- The Best House in London (1969) – Henchman (uncredited)
- Rekvijem (1970) – Officer
- The Nameless Knight (1970) – Dev (uncredited)
- The Blood on Satan's Claw (1971) – Dog Handler (uncredited)
- Carry on Henry (1971) – Executioner (uncredited)
- The Horsemen (1971) – Aqqul (uncredited)
- Au Pair Girls (1972) – The Guard
- Dr. Phibes Rises Again (1972) – Manservant – Cheng
- The Return of the Pink Panther (1975) – Japanese Restaurant Owner
- Adventures of a Private Eye (1978) – Bodyguard
- Come Play with Me (1977) – Tough
- The People That Time Forgot (1977) – Sabbala
- The Spy Who Loved Me (1977) – Sandor
- No. 1 of the Secret Service (1977) – Eye Patch
- Terror (1978) – Club Bouncer
- What's Up Superdoc! (1978) – Louie
- Confessions from the David Galaxy Affair (1979) – Eddie
- Arabian Adventure (1979) – Jinnee
- Queen of the Blues (1979) – Ricky
- Arabian Knights (1979) – Servant
- Westcountry Tales (1981) – The Monster (final film role)
