= Glynn Edwards =

British actor (1931–2018)

- Born: John Glynn Edwards; 2 February 1931; Penang, Straits Settlements
- Died: 23 May 2018 (aged 87); Edinburgh, Scotland
- Education: Royal Central School of Speech and Drama; Theatre Workshop
- Occupation: Actor
- Years active: Mid 1950s–1994
- Spouses: Yootha Joyce (m. 1956; div. 1969) Christine Pilgrim (m. 1969, divorced): Valerie Edwards (m. 1984)
- Children: 1

John Glynn Edwards (2 February 1931 – 23 May 2018) was a British actor who worked in television and films. He came to national prominence for his portrayal of the barman Dave Harris in the television comedy drama series Minder (1979–1994).

== Early life ==
Edwards was born in Penang, then part of the Straits Settlements in Malaya, on 2 February 1931. His father, who spent little time with his son, was a rubber planter at the time of his birth and died in 1946. His mother died when he was very young, and he was brought up firstly by his grandparents in Southsea, Hampshire, and then by his father and stepmother, in Salisbury, Wiltshire.

Edwards received his early formal education at Clayesmore School in Dorset. In his childhood he read Arthur Ransome's adventure novel Swallows and Amazons, which gave him a life-long passion for river-boating, which began with sailing expeditions along the River Avon in his tenth year.

Edwards performed in amateur dramatics in his teenage years and, after a period in Trinidad where he tried sugar farming, he returned to England and studied at the Royal Central School of Speech & Drama in London, before gaining employment as a stage manager at the King's Theatre in Gainsborough, Lincolnshire.

== Career ==
Edwards trained professionally as an actor with Joan Littlewood's Theatre Workshop at the Theatre Royal, Stratford East, appearing in its productions of The Good Soldier Švejk and two plays by Brendan Behan, The Quare Fellow and The Hostage, all of which transferred from the Theatre Royal Stratford East to the West End. He also appeared in that company's production of Lionel Bart's musical version of Frank Norman's play Fings Ain't Wot They Used T'Be, opposite Miriam Karlin and Barbara Windsor. He had been spotted by Littlewood herself, who had been in the audience at one of the performances of a successful play he had produced entitled The Call of the Flesh, which featured Yootha Joyce in an early role.

In 1964 he appeared in the role of Corporal William Allen, V.C. in Cy Endfield's cinema film Zulu, having opted for the part over another offer of a role in Joan Littlewood's stage show Oh, What a Lovely War!. He later said: "I earned 10 times as much money from (later in his career) advertising Bran Flakes as I did from the movie Zulu." He played supporting roles in the cinema films Robbery (1967), and the criminal underworld film Get Carter (1971).

From 1979 to 1994, he played the role of Dave Harris, the part-owner and barman of the Winchester Club in ten series of the ITV drama Minder.

He also appeared in bit parts in numerous British television shows in the 1970s and '80s, including Callan, The Professionals, Public Eye, Spindoe, Steptoe and Son, Some Mothers Do 'Ave 'Em, Dixon of Dock Green, Man About the House, Softly, Softly, The Persuaders!, and The Saint.

He was a regular in two series of the ITV legal drama The Main Chance (1972, 1975).

During his career Edwards played a number of darker character roles, particularly that of 'Mr Dix', a schoolteacher in the early-1970s sitcom Please Sir!, and a gamekeeper in ITV's Thriller (1973), and was often cast either as policemen or criminals.

In 1985, he appeared in the rock band Marillion's music video for their single "Heart of Lothian", in which he played a barman, and starred in a popular TV commercial for McVitie's rich tea biscuits as "Jacko", saying, "Yeah, I'll make a statement. A drink's too wet without one!"

== Personal life ==
Edwards' first wife was the actress Yootha Joyce, who also trained at Joan Littlewood's Theatre Workshop. They were married from 1956 to 1969. After their divorce, he married the former Benny Hill Show performer Christine Pilgrim, the marriage producing a son, Thomas (b. 1971). From the 1980s, he was married to Valerie Edwards.

Edwards retained a lifelong interest in river boating, owning several vessels, and during the 1980s and 1990s he resided on a 40 ft-long canal boat converted into a houseboat, named "Winchester" after the fictional private members' bar that he had run in the Minder television series, which was permanently moored on the south bank of the River Thames, at Thames Ditton and Surbiton.

Edwards retired from acting following the end of Minder in 1994, and in his final years divided his time between living in Spain and Scotland.

Edwards died at his home in Edinburgh, Scotland, on 23 May 2018 at the age of 87.

== Filmography ==
=== Film ===
Year	Title	Role	Notes	Ref.
1957	The Heart Within	1st Constable		
1962	A Prize of Arms	Boone	Uncredited	
1963	Sparrows Can't Sing	Charlie's friend	Uncredited	
1963	The Hi-Jackers	Bluey		
1964	Zulu	Corporal William Allen		
1964	Smokescreen	Inspector Wright		
1965	The Ipcress File	Police station sergeant		
1967	Robbery	Squad chief		
1968	The Blood Beast Terror	Sgt. Allan		
1968	The Bofors Gun	Sergeant-Major West		
1970	Fragment of Fear	CID Superintendent		
1971	Get Carter	Albert Swift		
1971	Under Milk Wood	Mr Cherry Owen		
1972	Burke & Hare	Hare		
1972	All Coppers Are...	Jock		
1973	Shaft in Africa	Vanden		
1974	11 Harrowhouse	First Guard	Credited as Glyn Edwards	
1977	The Stick Up	First Roadblock Policeman		
1978	The Playbirds	Chief Superintendent Holbourne		
1979	Confessions from the David Galaxy Affair	Chief Inspector Evans		
1980	Rising Damp	Cooper		
1983	Red Monarch	Vlasek	TV movie	
1987	Out of Order	Barman		
1988	The Seventh Sign	Newscaster #1		

=== Television ===
Year	Title	Role	Notes	Ref.
1963–1976	Dixon of Dock Green	Various	10 episodes	
1963	The Human Jungle	Albert Stokes	Episode: "The Two Edged Sword"	
1964	Z-Cars	Mr Cooper / Mr Aldiss	2 episodes	
1965	For Whom the Bell Tolls	Pablo	4 episodes	
1965–1969	The Newcomers	George Harbottle	many episodes	
1966	King of the River	Jack Elliot	Episode: "Foreign Invasion"	
1967–1968	The Saint	Leander / Igor	2 episodes	
1968–1969	Journey to the Unknown	Brown	Episode: "Stranger in the Family"	
1969	The Avengers	Blackie	Episode: "The Interrogators"	
1970	Steptoe and Son	George	Episode Steptoe and Son – and Son!	
1971	Public Eye	Alf Bain	Episode: "Who Wants to Be Told Bad News?"	
1971	Bless This House	Motor-cycle Policeman	Episode: "For Whom the Bells Toll"	
1971	Please Sir!	Mr Dix	2 Episodes	
1972–1978	Crown Court	Various	5 episodes	
1975–1976	Man About The House	Chrissy's father	2 episodes	
1976	Lucky Feller	Mr. Cecil Peake	5 episodes	
1977–1978	The Fall and Rise of Reginald Perrin	Mr. Pelham	3 episodes	
1977–1979	The Paper Lads	Jack Crawford	14 episodes	
1977	Target	Dyer	Episode: "Roadrunner"	
1978	Some Mothers Do 'Ave 'Em	Mr Lewis	3 episodes	
1979	The Professionals	Alfred Cole	Episode: "Servant of Two Masters"	
1979–1994	Minder	Dave Harris	95 episodes (final appearance)	
1982	Legacy of Murder	Henchman		
1983	Jack of Diamonds	Reg		
