= Come Play with Me (1977 film) =

1977 British film by Harrison Marks

Come Play With Me
- Film poster by Tom Chantrell
- Directed by: Harrison Marks
- Written by: Harrison Marks
- Produced by: David Sullivan
- Starring: Irene Handl; Alfie Bass; Harrison Marks; Ronald Fraser; Mary Millington; Suzy Mandel
- Music by: Peter Jeffries
- Distributed by: Tigon
- Release date: 28 April 1977
- Running time: 94 minutes
- Country: United Kingdom
- Language: English
- Budget: £120,000

Come Play with Me is a 1977 British softcore pornographic film, starring Alfie Bass and Harrison Marks and also directed by Harrison Marks. Its cast list contains many well-known British character actors who were not previously known for appearing in such films. The film is regarded by many as the most successful of the British sex comedies of the 1970s. It ran continuously at the Moulin Cinema in Great Windmill Street, Soho, London for 201 weeks, from April 1977 to March 1981, which is listed in the Guinness Book Of World Records as the longest-running screening in Britain. A blue plaque on the building next door to the former cinema's site commemorates this.

== Synopsis ==
Cornelius Clapworthy and his sidekick Maurice Kelly are two elderly forgers responsible for flooding the UK with fake banknotes. On the run from their gangster boss Slasher and effeminate, cross-dressing government official Podsnap, the pair escape to the Scottish Highlands and, posing as musicians, hide out at Bovington Manor, a hotel owned by Lady Bovington, who is attempting and failing to run it as a health farm.

The Manor has very few guests, and Clapworthy and Kelly find themselves free to continue their criminal activities, albeit having to constantly recite "O for the Wings of a Dove" on a portable organ to drown out the noise of the printing press that produces the fake banknotes. However, when Lady Bovington’s choreographer nephew Rodney and his troupe of dancing girls arrive at the Manor, business picks up considerably when the girls, vaguely under the leadership of Rena, decide to help Lady Bovington out by dressing as nurses and re-opening the Manor as a brothel, albeit using the health farm facilities, with topless massages and "the full treatment" being the order of the day. This means trouble and unwanted attention for Clapworthy and Kelly, especially when the girls’ services attract Slasher and his heavies to the Manor.

== Cast ==
- Irene Handl as Lady Bovington
- Alfie Bass as Kelly
- Harrison Marks as Cornelius Clapworthy
- Ronald Fraser as Slasher
- Ken Parry as Podsnap
- Bob Todd as Vicar
- Henry McGee as Deputy Prime Minister
- Mary Millington as Sue
- Suzy Mandel as Rena
- Tommy Godfrey as Blitt
- Cardew Robinson as McIvar
- Talfryn Thomas as Nosegay
- Jerry Lordan as Rodney
- Rita Webb as Rita
- Anna Bergman as Nanette
- Sue Longhurst as Christina
- Valentine Dyall as Minister of Finance
- Talfryn Thomas as Nosegay
- Norman Vaughan as Stage Performer
- Queenie Watts as Cafe Girl
- Michael Balfour as Nosher
- Penny Chisholm as Tess
- Derek Aylward as Sir Geoffrey
- Pat Astley as Josie
- Milton Reid as Tough
- Susie Silvey as Bikini Girl (uncredited)

== Production history ==
Harrison Marks had written Come Play With Me's script in 1970, not long after making The Nine Ages of Nakedness, but it was to remain on the shelf while in the ensuing years he was declared bankrupt, was the subject of an obscenity trial, and drank heavily. He made ends meet during this period by shooting short softcore sex films for the British 8 mm market, as well as hardcore, blue movie shorts for overseas.

In the mid-1970s Marks had begun selling explicit photo shoots to porn publisher David Sullivan’s top-shelf magazines, such as Latent Lesbian Fantasy featuring Cosey Fanni Tutti, which appeared in the first issue of Sullivan's Ladybirds magazine in August 1976. Marks had, evidently, also sold Sullivan the rights to some of his 8 mm sex films; press adverts by Kelerfern (a Sullivan mail order company) carried Marks-directed sex shorts like Hole in One, Nymphomania, King Muff and Doctor Sex for sale around this period. In the 2005 documentary Oo-Err Missus, Sullivan remarks: "George was a great entertainer, he was a bit of a drunk really, but he was good fun … he said to me: 'I’ve got this old script I’ve had for years', I said: 'give us a look George' and within three weeks we were shooting it".

Much of the glamour in the film was provided by nude models popular in Sullivan's top-shelf magazines at the time (Millington, Pat Astley, Penny Chisholm, Nicola Austin), as well as more mainstream comedy actresses like Ingmar Bergman’s daughter Anna Bergman, Sue Longhurst and Suzy Mandel from The Benny Hill Show. Lower down the cast list, actresses like Lisa Taylor, Sonia Svenburger and Suzette Sangalo Bond all had blue-movie backgrounds.

=== Filming ===
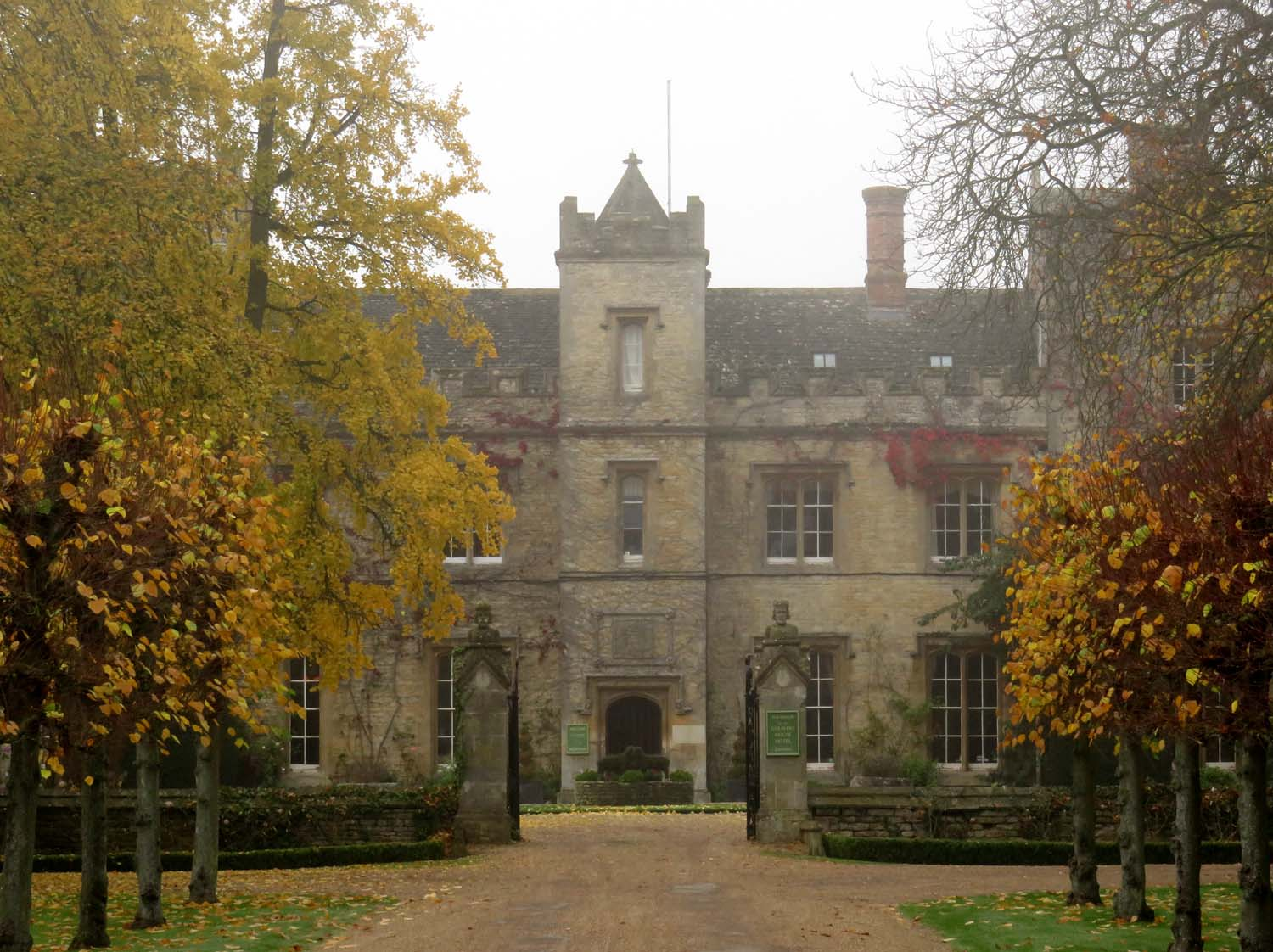
The Weston Manor Hotel in Oxfordshire was one of the film's shooting locations.

Come Play With Me was filmed during the autumn of 1976. Bovington Manor was in reality the Weston Manor Hotel, near Oxford. Owing to work commitments, Suzy Mandel was absent from the scene that introduces the girls travelling to Bovington Manor onboard a coach (she was taping a Benny Hill episode at the time).

After seeing a rough cut of the film, Sullivan and representatives of the distributor Tigon thought the film needed more nudity as well as more Mary Millington, so several additional scenes—including Mary's big scene with Marks' regular Howard "Vanderhorn" Nelson—were filmed. The "add-on" nature of these scenes to the narrative is sometimes apparent.

Several hardcore porn scenes were also shot for Come Play With Me. These would have appeared towards the end of the film; however, in the event all traces of hardcore sex were cut from these scenes in the pre-release stage, and the explicit footage went missing soon afterward. "For real" were the lesbian scene between Mary Millington and Penny Chisholm, as well as the heterosexual sex scenes between Lisa Taylor and Derek Aylward, Suzette Sangalo Bond and an unknown male, and Sonia Svenberger and Gordon Hickman. These scenes remain in the film, albeit heavily cut down to softcore, with only Penny Chisholm's "flushed" face during her sex scene with Mary giving a hint of these scenes' explicit origins.

== Marketing ==
Sullivan saw Come Play With Me as a chance to turn his then-girlfriend and magazine cover girl Mary Millington into a film star, as well as an opportunity for some cross-media marketing. Sullivan's magazines like Playbirds and Whitehouse are seen throughout the film, and the promotion of the film within the magazines was extensive. Months before the film's release, Sullivan’s readers were promised Come Play with Me would be "the British Deep Throat" and would "make Linda Lovelace look like Noddy". To add credibility to these claims, photo shoots only slightly short of being hardcore were published in Sullivan’s magazines and claimed to be stills from the upcoming film, whereas in fact they bore little resemblance to anything in Come Play With Me. Frequently shown in these photo shoots was hardcore actor Timothy Blackstone, sometimes billed in the articles as "Randy Buck, Esquire". In spite of this exposure, Blackstone does not appear in the actual film.

The promotion for Come Play with Me also appeared in the letters pages of Sullivan’s magazines. A fan letter of dubious authenticity (as it refers to scenes that do not appear in the film) from "Bert U" to Mary Millington in issue 27 of Whitehouse claims: "Dear Mary, I must congratulate you on your film Come Play with Me, I found it screamingly funny and very sexy as well…I loved every randy moment… everyone was so natural, and Henry McGhee [sic] as the PM was superb." The letter goes on to falsely claim that the actor Roy Kinnear appears in the film, and that "(Roy) looked like a Roman Emperor in the swimming pool scene. I‘ll bet it took him all his time to keep his towel on during rehearsals for the film… it looked to me, Mary, as though you were fucked rigid during the film".

In March 1977 Sullivan published the Playbirds Erotic Film Guide, a magazine entirely concerned with the release of Come Play with Me. The film was also adapted into a paperback novel, and in the summer of 1977 a sequel paperback novel, Come Play with Me Again, was released.

== Significance ==
The film ran continuously at the Moulin Cinema in London's West End from April 1977 to March 1981, and is regarded by many as the most successful of the British sex comedies of the seventies. Costing £120,000 to make, the film took £550,000 during its West End run, and broke box-office records in the cinemas of a number of provincial cities. By 2001, the film had taken over £4 million. In a publicity stunt for the first anniversary of the film’s opening, Suzy Mandel and Mary Millington posed in lingerie on the Moulin Cinema's marquee. Sullivan's follow-up film The Playbirds (1978) gave Millington a more sizable role.

While Millington’s popularity and Sullivan’s relentless publicity campaign are without doubt what made the film a success, Come Play with Me remains a peculiarly Harrison Marks concoction, with Marks’ background as a photographer of nudes, his love of old-style British music hall comedy, and his heavy drinking adding much to the film's overall character. As comic counterfeiters Cornelius Clapworthy and his sidekick Maurice Kelly, Marks and Alfie Bass resemble a baggy-pants comedy double-act from the music hall days; the pair even sleep together in the same bed, à la Morecambe and Wise. Marks also throws in a song-and-dance routine, "It's Great to be Here", performed by himself, Bass, and a group of sexy nurses. "George was in a bit of a time warp, he forgot at times that it was a sex film he was making", commented Sullivan, "he thought he was making some vaudeville comedy… I thought it was a weird old film".

A blue plaque on the site of the former Moulin Cinema in Great Windmill Street, Soho, commemorates its 201-week run there, which is listed in the Guinness Book Of World Records as the longest-running screening in British cinema history. However, the validity of this record and the blue plaque is called into question in the second edition of David McGillivray’s book Doing Rude Things which states that "film historian Allen Eyles has proven conclusively that Come Play With Me ran for 165 not 201 weeks. It is not Britain’s longest running film – that is South Pacific, which ran... a total of four years and twenty-two weeks. Questions should be asked in parliament about the deception I may have instigated."

== Imitations and spin-offs ==
The success of Come Play With Me inevitably led to imitation productions sometimes similar in name only, and some more authorized than others.

- Cum Lay With Me (1977): short 8 mm sex film starring Sonia Svenburger and directed by Harrison Marks.
- Come With Me (circa 1977): audio cassette of sex noises ("the turn-on tape of all time"), also sold in cartridge format.
- Come Play With Me (1980): stage farce loosely based on the film, starring Bob Grant from On the Buses.
- Come Play With Me: Part 2 (1980): unrelated Swiss sex film directed by Erwin C. Dietrich, re-titled by Tigon and David Sullivan and promoted as a "sequel" to the earlier film.
- Come Play With Me: Part 3 (1982): unrelated Swiss sex film again directed by Dietrich, re-titled by Tigon and David Sullivan and promoted as a second "sequel" to the earlier film.

== Release history ==
- Come Play With Me was released on 8 mm by Fletcher Films and on VHS by Hokushin Audio Visual in 1979.
- The film was periodically released on VHS in the 1980s on a variety of softcore labels, although a 1986 release on the "Pink Climax" label, while claiming to be the Marks film on the video packaging, actually contains the unrelated "sequel" Come Play With Me part 3 on the tape itself, possibly released in error.
- In April 1997, Medusa Pictures released the film on VHS as part of their "X-Films of the Saucy 70s" series (the first release to put the film into a retro/historic context).
- The film had two early DVD releases in the UK, the first by Medusa Pictures (1999) with the short 6-minute prologue to the 1980 documentary True Blue Confessions as an extra. The second DVD is copyrighted 2005 and looked to have been derived from an old tape of the film, possibly the Hokushin one, and included the full version of True Blue Confessions, but again the picture appears taken from a VHS.
- Come Play with Me was reissued as a special edition DVD on 26 April 2010, by Odeon Entertainment. Special features on the DVD included the 1980 documentary Mary Millington's True Blue Confessions, the Harrison Marks short Sex is My Business (starring Millington), an extensive stills gallery and an 8-page essay on the making of the film, written by Simon Sheridan, with memories from actresses Anna Bergman, Sue Longhurst and Suzy Mandel.
- A restored version of the film was released on Blu Ray in 2020 by Screenbound Pictures as part of the Mary Millington Movie Collection.

== See also ==
- Pornography in the United Kingdom
