= Suzy Mandel =

English actress

- Born: Jacqueline Ann Elaine Jefcoate; 6 March 1953 (age 73); London, England
- Occupations: Actress; model
- Spouse: Stanley Margolis (m. 1981; div. 1994)

Jacqueline Ann Elaine Jefcoate (born 6 March 1953), better known as Suzy Mandel, is a British former actress and model best known for her roles in such mid-1970s British sex comedies as Intimate Games (1976), Confessions of a Driving Instructor (1976), Come Play with Me (1977), The Playbirds (1978), and Adventures of a Plumber's Mate (1978), and for her appearances on The Benny Hill Show.

== Early life ==
Born in London, Mandel grew up on the Isle of Sheppey, Kent and later in Essex at Epping, Woodford and Buckhurst Hill. She was partly raised by her grandparents "who owned bars and clubs and holidays camps".

Beginning at age 13, she attended London Academy of Modeling in London.

== Career ==
=== Early years ===
She began her career as a coat model but was also a catwalk model and later a photographic model. Later, she modelled lingerie and was a contestant on Miss TV Times (broadcast on UK television on 14 June 1974 and presented by Hughie Green).

=== In sex comedies ===
Mandel's acting career in British sex comedies began in 1976, with her first film, Intimate Games. Benny Hill saw Intimate Games, and this led him to cast Mandel on his eponymous show. She appears in multiple roles on two 1977 episodes of the series (broadcast in the UK 26 January 1977 and 23 March 1977). Of Hill and Jackie Wright's famous "head slapping" routine, she said "Jackie Wright was a chain smoker and he would often hide his cigarette in his mouth or behind his back during scenes. In fact, you could often see a little plume of smoke rising behind him if you looked close enough. Benny would slap his head to fan the smoke away."

On the big screen, she quickly became a favourite of both British sex film directors and audiences. Soon she was receiving equal billing with Mary Millington, the UK's biggest sex symbol of the 1970s. Millington and Mandel's film, Come Play With Me still stands as one of the longest-running films in British film history, and ran continuously at the Moulin Cinema in London's West End from 1977 to 1981.

=== Performing in the US ===
After the release of her final British sex film, You're Driving Me Crazy (1978), Mandel moved to Los Angeles where, in 1979, she attended the Lee Strasberg Institute for about a year, studying acting and voice. She also studied with noted voice and dialect coach Robert Easton. Mandel continued acting, appearing in the film The Mistress of the Apes (directed by B-movie specialist Larry Buchanan).

She appears in the 1980 comedy The Private Eyes starring Tim Conway and Don Knotts as Hilda, the Upstairs Maid. She guest starred on television shows like The Love Boat.

She also appeared in the hardcore film Blonde Ambition (also known as Can I Come Again), which was shot in New York City in 1977, but only released in 1980. Blonde Ambition stars Mandel as Sugar Kane, half of a talentless duo of singers who become embroiled in the search for a missing brooch. Directed by the eccentric Amero Brothers, the role required Mandel to strip while ice skating, impersonate a drag queen, play the tuba and perform in hardcore sex scenes. (She used a body double for the last.)

=== Later years ===
Mandel eventually moved behind the scenes, working on the horror comedy Dead Men Don't Die (1991) starring Elliott Gould as well as co-producing Love Bites, starring Adam Ant, in 1993, (she appears briefly onscreen as well).

In 1996, Mandel revealed in the British newspaper The People that she had quit show business to work as a nurse, caring for people dying from AIDS after several of her friends had died from the disease.

For a short period of time, she ran an art gallery in Beverly Hills, California. However she returned to the nursing work, until 2001, when she was "involved in a very serious accident" which caused her to retire from that work.

In 2006, she returned to producing, working with adult video director Jennifer James on a series, Inside Erotica.

The 2014 tongue-in-cheek British television documentary The Golden Rules of Porn (broadcast on More4 on 9 August 2014) included Mandel discussing her roles in the soft-core British comedies Confessions of a Driving Instructor, Come Play with Me, The Playbirds and sharing her thoughts on bad chat-up lines and high heels.

== Personal life ==
Mandel has been married more than once. On 16 August 1981, she married wealthy British film financier Stanley Margolis. Margolis had owned Tigon British Film Productions, the company that released some of her best-known British films, and that would later co-produce the 1993 film True Romance. She and Margolis divorced in 1994.

== Filmography ==
- Health Farm (hardcore short 1975) ... 2nd Girl
- Girls Come First (short 1975) ... French maid (uncredited)
- Intimate Games (1976) ... Erica
- Confessions of a Driving Instructor (1976) ... Mrs. Hargreaves
- Come Play with Me (1977) ... Rena
- Over Exposed (hardcore short 1977) ... Susan
- The Playbirds (1978) ... Lena Cunningham
- Adventures of a Plumber's Mate (1978) ... First Tennis Girl
- You're Driving Me Crazy (1978) ... Anthea
- Mistress of the Apes (1979) ... Secretary
- Blonde Ambition (hardcore 1980, filmed 1977) ... Sugar Cane
- The Private Eyes (1980) ... Hilda
- The Sword and the Sorcerer (1982)

== Television ==
- The Lotus Eaters (TV show, BBC 1973)
- Miss TV Times (TV show, LWT 1974) ... Herself/Contestant
- Dial M for Murder (TV show, BBC 1974)
- Churchill's People (TV show, BBC 1970s)
- The Girls of Slender Means (TV show, BBC 1975)
- Play of the Month: King Lear (TV show, BBC 1975)
- The Fight Against Slavery (TV show, BBC 1975)
- Rutland Weekend Television (TV show, BBC 1975 episode "Rutland Weekend Whistle Test" in sketch "A Penny for your Warts")
- The Best of Marty (TV show 1970s)
- The Generation Game (TV show, BBC 1970s)
- The Basil Brush Show (TV show, BBC 1970s)
- Rentaghost (TV show, BBC 1970s)
- What's on Next (TV show, Thames, 1976)
- Whatever Happened to the Likely Lads? (TV show, BBC 1970s)
- The Benny Hill Show (TV show, Thames 1977) ... Various roles
- The Dick Emery Show (TV show, BBC 1977) ... Dawn, the biker chick
- Within These Walls (TV show, LWT 1970s)
- Z-Cars (TV show, BBC 1970s)
- Van der Valk (TV show, 1970s)
- Target (TV show, BBC 1970s)
- Jackanory Playhouse (TV show, 1970s)
- George Sands (TV show, 1970s)
- Nice Day Tomorrow (TV show, 1970s)
- The Liver Birds (TV show, BBC 1970s)
- The Sweeney (TV show, Thames 1970s)
- Rock Follies (TV show, Thames 1970s)
- The Barry Humphries Show (TV show, BBC 1977)
- The World of Pam Ayres (TV show, LWT 1977)
- The XYY Man (TV show, Granada 1970s)
- The Other One (TV show, BBC 1970s)
- Play of the Month: The Country Wife (TV show, BBC 1977)
- Mr. Big (TV show, BBC 1977)
- Play of the Month: The Ambassadors (TV show, BBC 1977)
- Get Some In! (TV show, BBC 1977) ... Non-responsive W.A.A.F.
- Pennies from Heaven (TV show, BBC, 1978)
- The Love Boat (TV show, ABC 1980) ... Trina
- Kawasaki (TV Commercial, 1980s)
- Toyota (TV Commercial, 1980s)
- Nissan (TV Commercial, 1980s)
- Red Mountain Coffee (TV Commercial, 1980s)
- We're Making It (TV show, series regular, 1980s)
- Sunset Strip (TV show, series regular, 1980s)
- All Nonsense Network News (TV show, series regular/opera reporter, 1980s)
- Love Bites (1993)

== Magazine covers ==
- Whitehouse issue 27
- Whitehouse issue 25
- Park Lane issue 21
- Playbirds issue 14, 1977
- Playbirds issue 13, 1977
- National News issue 8
- Lovebirds issue 6
- Cine Revue 1 May 1980, Vol. 1, Iss. 18
