= David Sullivan (businessman) =

British businessman and former pornographer (born 1949)

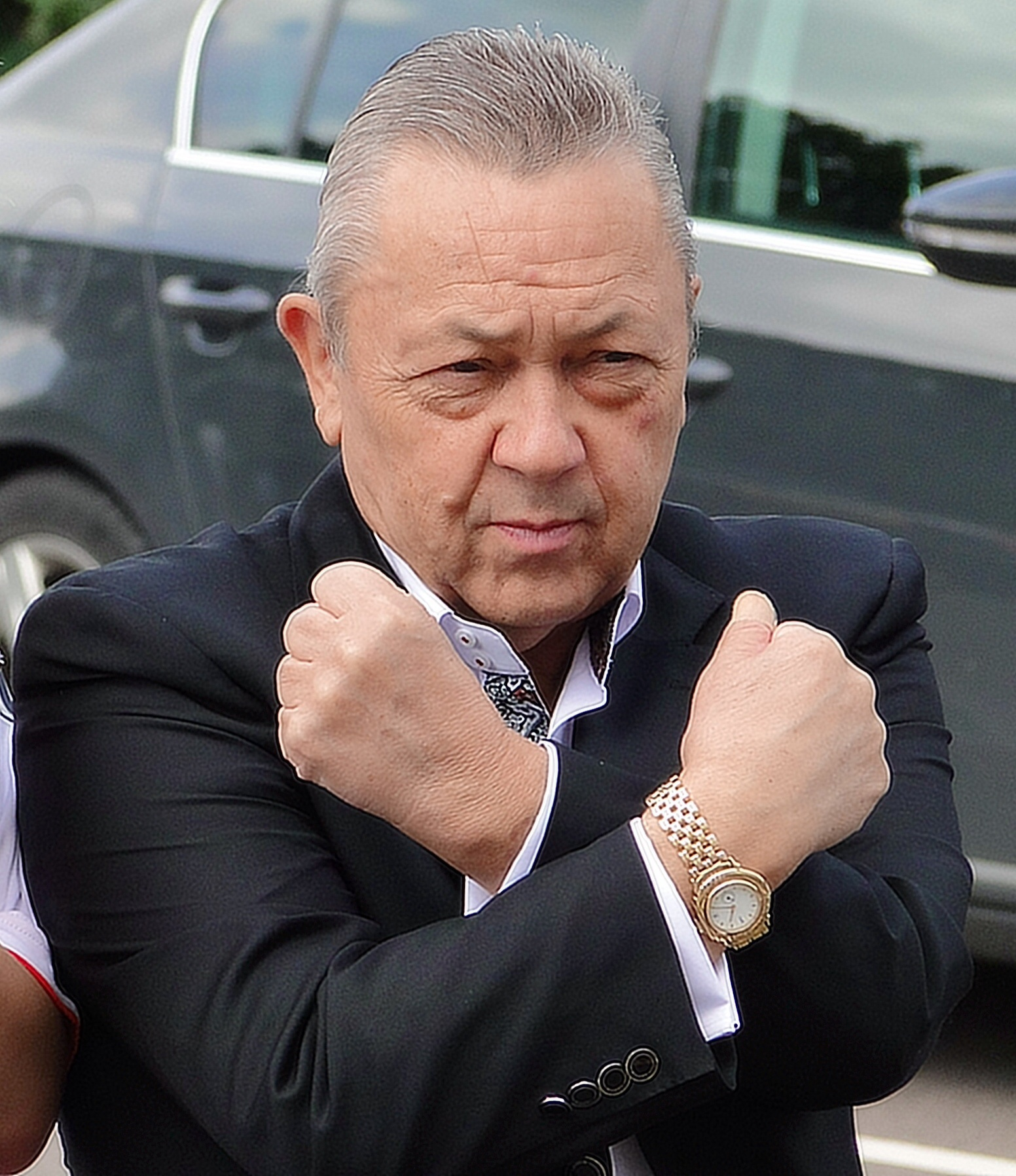
- Sullivan giving the "Hammers sign" in 2014
- Born: 5 February 1949 (age 77); Cardiff, Wales
- Occupations: Publisher; businessman
- Years active: 1970–present
- Known for: Daily Sport; Sunday Sport
- Title: Chairman of West Ham United (2010–2026); Chairman of Birmingham City (1993–2009)
- Partner: Ampika Pickston (2020-present) Emma Benton-Hughes (1997–2021)
- Children: Jack Sullivan (Son); David Sullivan Jr (Son)

David Sullivan (born 5 February 1949) is a Welsh businessman, who has had interests in pornography, sex shops, tabloid newspapers, property and football clubs.

He initially made his fortune in the pornography industry in the 1970s and 1980s. From 1986 to 2007, he owned the tabloid newspapers the Daily Sport and Sunday Sport, which he sold for £40 million. From 2010 to 2026 he was the chairman of the English football club West Ham United, alongside his business partner David Gold until Gold's death in 2023. He remains the club's largest single shareholder. Sullivan and Gold were previously joint-chairmen of Birmingham City. According to the 2025 Sunday Times Rich List, Sullivan is worth £1.118 billion.

== Early life ==
Born in Cardiff, the son of an RAF serviceman, Sullivan grew up in a Penarth council house. When Sullivan was 10 years old, his father was posted to Aden, now in Yemen, where they lived for a year before moving to England to live in Hornchurch, Essex. He attended the Abbs Cross school and gained ten O Levels. After his family moved to Hertfordshire he attended Watford Grammar School for Boys obtaining three A levels. He then read Economics at Queen Mary College, University of London, narrowly missing a first.

== Pornography industry ==
With his business partner David Gold, Sullivan's first venture was selling softcore pornographic photos. They expanded into sex shops, adult magazines and low-budget blue movies, making Sullivan a millionaire by the age of 25. Sullivan opened his first sex shop, called Private Shop, in 1978, with plans to expand across the UK. By the late 1970s, he was in control of half of the UK adult magazine market, including major titles such as Playbirds and Whitehouse, 80% of the adult mail order market, and 150 shops.

In the late 1970s, he produced several low-budget British sex movies including Come Play with Me (1977) (directed by Harrison Marks). This was followed by The Playbirds (1978), Confessions from the David Galaxy Affair (1979) and Queen of the Blues (1979), all starring his then-girlfriend Mary Millington. After Millington's suicide in August 1979, he continued trading off her name with Mary Millington's True Blue Confessions (1980). Millington had also been intended to star in his next film, Emmanuelle in Soho (1981).

In 1982, Sullivan was convicted of living off immoral earnings of prostitutes. He successfully appealed against the sentence and was released after serving 71 days in prison. Sullivan said that he did not feel embarrassed about the initial source of his early fortunes. "I've made a lot of people happy," he said. "If I was an arms manufacturer or a cigarette manufacturer, and my products killed millions of my clients, I'd have a bit of doubt about the whole thing. I was a freedom fighter. I believe in the right of adults to make their own decisions."

In 2003 Sullivan transferred his magazine portfolio to his business partners David and Ralph Gold.

== Property ==
Sullivan operates an investment company, Conegate, which owns property in London, including the building of the Russell & Bromley flagship store in Oxford Street near Bond Street tube station.

== Football ==
=== Birmingham City ===
In 1993, Sullivan bought into Birmingham City, with David Gold and Ralph Gold. The new owners secured an 80% stake of the club.

In 2007, Sullivan expressed his first desire to sell his share in Birmingham City and openly admitted three reasons for a possible departure. "One, the geographical distance. I've said for years the journey to Birmingham is killing me. Two, I think deep down the public have had enough of us. They think we should have mortgaged our houses to buy more players to compete with Chelsea and Arsenal. The honeymoon is long over and we're at the divorce stage now, unfortunately. And I also feel we've had no support from Birmingham Council."

After 16 years at the club, Birmingham managing director Karren Brady and chairman David Sullivan agreed to step down from their posts on completion of Carson Yeung's takeover in autumn 2009. The Birmingham manager at the time, Alex McLeish, praised the Sullivan–Gold duo in the media for providing the club with financial stability, while some Blues fans criticised the owners for not investing into the team.

=== West Ham United ===
On Sullivan's departure from Birmingham, he expressed his intentions to remain in football. Less than one year later in January 2010, he and David Gold acquired a 50% share in West Ham United giving them operational and commercial control and valuing the Premier League club at £105 million. Brady joined the Hammers as vice-chairman.

On the day the takeover was confirmed, an emotional Sullivan said: "It's going to take time to sink in. We've been wanting to sit here for 20 years and together we owned 27 per cent of the club 22 years ago and it's taken us 22 years to get to where want to be. Both me and David are supporters, I went to university here and I lived in Hornchurch. David lived 50 yards from the ground for 20 years of his life and played for West Ham's youth team. We just want to be here where we've always wanted to be. There is no other club we would want to be at so for us we have come home and that's what it's all about."

Within five months the Sullivan and Gold duo pledged a further commitment to the club and on 25 May 2010 they increased their stake to 60% (Sullivan with 30%). Vice-chairman Karren Brady later explained the move gave the football club "the much-needed stability."

In September 2012, Sullivan revealed that he and Gold were personally funding the club's transfer business. As part of his long-term aspirations for the club, Sullivan backed West Ham's bid to move into the Olympic Stadium in Stratford. On 22 March 2013, West Ham secured a 99-year lease deal, with the stadium planned to be used as their home ground from the 2016–2017 season. In July 2013, Sullivan became the largest single shareholder of West Ham United acquiring a further 25% of shares in the club. In March 2018, there were protests against Sullivan at the London Stadium during a 3–0 home defeat to Burnley. There were four pitch invasions and Sullivan was escorted from his seat before the end of the match. Sullivan was also hit by a coin thrown by one of the supporters.

On 26 March 2018, an HMRC tax tribunal ruled that Sullivan had used West Ham United to avoid paying £700,000 tax for his own family business, Conegate Ltd. Sullivan used Conegate to buy £2 million of shares in the holding company that owns West Ham. The same day the shares were converted to "deferred shares", deemed practically worthless and sold back to the holding company for £1. Conegate thereby used the £2 million loss to reduce its tax bill.

=== Hornchurch ===
Sullivan financially supported Hornchurch F.C. in November 2020 when their season was suspended due to the COVID-19 pandemic. He once lived in Hornchurch.

== Allegations of sexual misconduct ==
In 2023, after allegations and a safeguarding investigation, Sullivan was banned from contact with West Ham's women's and youth teams, including their matches. On 6 June 2026, Sullivan stood down as chairman after West Ham were "made aware of the impending publication of serious historic allegations." In a separate statement, Sullivan denied these allegations, describing them as "factually incorrect and entirely false." The allegations were made public on 8 June 2026 through a joint investigation by the BBC's Panorama and The Times newspaper into the behaviour of Sullivan, when several women accused Sullivan of abusing his power as a publisher and preying on them for sex when they were in their late teens and early 20s and seeking employment.

== Personal life ==
Sullivan lives in Birch Hall, near Theydon Bois, Essex. His partner is Ampika Pickston, star of The Real Housewives of Cheshire. Sullivan has two children, including Jack, with ex-girlfriend Emma Benton-Hughes (formerly known as Eve Vorley while working as a porn actress).
