= Jack of Diamonds (TV series) =

1983 British TV series

- Genre: Comedy
- Written by: John Singer; Steven Singer
- Starring: Dick Emery; Tony Selby; Glynn Edwards; Christopher Bramwell
- Composer: Ronnie Hazlehurst
- Country of origin: United Kingdom
- Original language: English
- No. of series: 1
- No. of episodes: 6

Production
- Producer: Stuart Allen
- Cinematography: Rex Maidment; David Swan
- Editor: Mike Jackson
- Running time: 30 minutes
- Production company: BBC

Original release
- Network: BBC One
- Release: 3 June – 15 July 1983

Related
- Legacy of Murder

Jack of Diamonds (also known as Emery Presents: Jack of Diamonds) is a 1983 British comedy television series starring Dick Emery. It was written by John Singer and Steven Singer, and originally aired on BBC One in six half-hour episodes between 3 June and 15 July 1983. It was a loose sequel to the previous year's Legacy of Murder series in which Emery had also played private detective Bernie Weinstock, and other characters similar to those in The Dick Emery Show.

The series was originally intended to be broadcast in January 1983, but was postponed after Emery's death that month.

== Synopsis ==
London-based private eye Bernie Weinstock and his partner Norman Lugg are drawn into the hunt for some diamonds stashed away in Holland by a British corporal during the Second World War. With both the police and criminals on their tail, the chase takes them to a country house in Worcestershire, Brighton Marina, Amsterdam and finally to a castle near Munich in Bavaria.

== Selected cast ==
- Dick Emery as Bernie Weinstock / various characters (6 episodes)
- Tony Selby as Norman Lugg (6 episodes)
- Glynn Edwards as Reg (6 episodes)
- Christopher Bramwell as Oliver Ottershaw (6 episodes)
- John Cater as Foxwell (5 episodes)
- Helen Gill as Helen Carter (5 episodes)
- Patrick Waldron as Det. Sgt. Frisby (4 episodes)
- James Villiers as George Billyard (4 episodes)
- Bill Stewart as Micky Jordan (4 episodes)
- Mike Lewin as thug (4 episodes)
- Rosie Collins as Sharon Finch (3 episodes)
- Sue Bond as Gloria (1 episode)
- Larry Martyn as barman (1 episode)
- Derek Deadman as pickpocket (1 episode)
- Tim Barrett as the bookie (1 episode)
- Anthony Dawes as polo match steward (1 episode)
- Jo Rowbottom as chambermaid (1 episode)
