= The Naked World of Harrison Marks =

1967 film by George Harrison Marks

- Theatrical release poster
- Directed by: George Harrison Marks
- Produced by: George Harrison Marks
- Starring: Pamela Green, June Palmer, George Harrison Marks
- Narrated by: Valentine Dyall
- Production company: Harrison Marks Production
- Distributed by: Gala
- Release date: 1966
- Running time: 84 mins
- Country: United Kingdom
- Language: English

The Naked World of Harrison Marks is a 1966 British pseudo-documentary about adult film director and photographer George Harrison Marks starring Marks, Valentine Dyall, Pamela Green and June Palmer.

== Plot ==
The film looks at Marks' daily life and work, with added dream sequences.

== Cast ==
- Valentine Dyall (narration)
- George Harrison Marks
- Pamela Green
- June Palmer
- Jerry Lorden
- Ann Wilson
- Terry Mahern
- Beryl Gilchrist
- Teresa Baron
- Karen Birch
- Jacky Brown
- Claire Burden
- Deloritte Chune
- Dawn Grayson
- Derek Nichols
- Christopher Williams
- Jutka Goz
- Chris Bromfield
- Vicky Groves
- Julie Jorden
- Ann Walker
- David Roberts
- Cindy Lomond
- Annette Johnson
- Sam Stuart
- Ken Hayes
- Audrey Judson
- Marina Jones
- Deborah De Lacy
- Sandy Lyndon
- Cleo Simmons
- Lee Southern

== Production ==
The film was mainly shot at Harrison Marks' studios at Lily Place, London, with the occasional location such as Ewhurst Manor. It was during the auditions for the film that George Harrison Marks met his future wife, Toni Burnett.

== Release ==
Despite censorship troubles with the BBFC due to its abundant nudity, it ran for over a year in London's West End.

== Critical reception ==
The Monthly Film Bulletin wrote: "A study of the life and works of Harrison Marks, photographer of nudes. Endless shots of nude models posed against a variety of garish backgrounds are interspersed with dispiriting scenes in which Harrison Marks judges a beauty contest, works on some glum-looking home movies, or acts out a coy farce about the difficulties involved in photographing a cat. Long, repetitive and exceedingly boring, the whole thing is shot in raffish colour and accompanied by a fulsomely silly commentary: "Harrison Marks is a dreamer, and the city of London is the centre of all his dreams" – cue for a few routine picture-postcard exteriors."

Kine Weekly wrote: "Since he is producer, director, part author and star of the film, one can assume that it expresses the personality of Harrison Marks and the commentary, which Harrison Marks also interrupts at intervals, suggests that he is a photographer who can be compared with a composer, even perhaps a poet. There Is a long sequence in which he is disguised as Toulouse Lautrec. There is also a tiresome burlesque shooting a film and other amateurish episodes that almost entirely counterbalance the star's undoubted talents as a photographer with an eye for colour and design as well as for nudity."
