= Mistress of the Apes =

- Directed by: Larry Buchanan
- Written by: Larry Buchanan
- Produced by: Larry Buchanan
- Starring: Jenny Neumann; Barbara Leigh; Garth Pillsbury; Walt Robin
- Release date: 1979
- Country: United States
- Language: English

Mistress of the Apes is a 1979 film from Larry Buchanan.

== Plot ==
After losing her baby, anthropologist's wife Susan Jamison heads an expedition to Africa to find her missing husband. There she discovers a group of ape men who decide to adopt her as their queen.

== Cast ==
- Jenny Neumann as Susan Jamison
- Barbara Leigh as Laura Thurston
- Garth Pillsbury as Paul Cory
- Walt Robin as David Thurston
- Stuart Lancaster as Brady
- Mark Rhudy as Matthews
- Marius Mazmanian as Sikes
- Suzy Mandel as Secretary

== Reception ==
TV Guide panned the film, rating it one star and writing "The farfetched premise makes for some pretty entertaining moments, including some unintentionally funny philosophical meandering." Writing in the Independent Critic, Richard Propes described the film as "fairly close to dreadful" and "so bad that it's highlight would have to be the Tom Jones like vocals [...] that's sort of a cross between tribal rhythms and Vegas lounge."
