= Jack Sullivan (executive) =

British sports executive (born 1999)

- Born: November 1999 (age 26)
- Title: Director of West Ham United (2021–present)
- Parent(s): David Sullivan (father); Emma Benton-Hughes (mother)

Jack Sullivan (born November 1999) is a British sports executive who is currently a director at West Ham United. He is the son of former West Ham chairman David Sullivan.

== Social media and journalism ==
Sullivan first came to public attention following his controversial use of Twitter to discuss West Ham United's club affairs and transfers. In 2013, commenting on the signing of Marouane Chamakh, Sullivan wrote "I am very sorry about this news Chamakh has sign a 6 month loan deal! not my pick :(". In 2015, Sullivan posted a picture of West Ham manager, Sam Allardyce laughing in a tweet mocking West Ham rivals, Millwall following their relegation to League One.

Sullivan was criticised by Graeme Souness for his use of Twitter. Souness wrote in The Times that the use of Twitter to criticise the manager's selections, substitutions and signings was unacceptable. Former West Ham manager, Sam Allardyce, blamed owner David Sullivan for giving the information to his son and for allowing him to tweet it.

Sullivan also wrote a column called The Insider on West Ham's website. This discussed transfer targets and fees and was pulled from the club's official website on the orders of West Ham's managing director, Karren Brady after she had been inundated with complaints from supporters.

Following this Sullivan was engaged by The Sun tabloid newspaper to write a twice monthly column.

== West Ham United Women ==
Sullivan was appointed by his father as managing director of West Ham United Women in 2017, having been involved with the women's team since leaving school in 2016 aged 16. Appointed to the role by his father, West Ham United owner David Sullivan, at age 17, Jack Sullivan was believed to be the youngest executive in English football history at the time of his appointment. In Sullivan's first year, he led an application to advance the club from the part-time third division to the Women's Super League; it was West Ham's first appearance in the top competition. In 2018 he was the subject of a BBC Three programme, Britain's Youngest Football Boss, focusing on his running of the club and on the lives of female footballers. The programme was later shown on BBC One after Match of the Day, achieving viewing figures of 1.3 million. Sullivan resigned his directorship on 26 May 2021 and Karren Brady joined the board in February 2023.

== West Ham United ==
In November 2021, following Daniel Křetínský's purchase of 27% of shares at the club, Sullivan was appointed as a director at West Ham United.

== Personal life ==
Sullivan attended Chigwell School. He has dyslexia. In the Sunday Times Rich List, produced in May 2020, Sullivan was listed as the third richest person aged under 30 in the UK.
