= The Nine Ages of Nakedness =

1969 British film by Harrison Marks

- Theatrical release poster
- Directed by: Harrison Marks
- Starring: Harrison Marks; Rita Webb; Sue Bond; Cardew Robinson; Howard 'Vanderhorn' Nelson; June Palmer
- Distributed by: ORB
- Release date: September 1969
- Running time: 95 minutes
- Country: United Kingdom
- Language: English

The Nine Ages of Nakedness (also known as The 9 Ages of Nakedness) is a 1969 British sex film, directed by Harrison Marks, and starring Marks as himself and featuring Bruno Elrington, June Palmer, Julian Orchard, Max Wall and Cardew Robinson.

== Plot ==
=== The wraparound story ===
"World famous photographer of nudes" Harrison Marks visits an Indian psycho-analyst on Harley Street. While most male viewers imagine that Marks seems to have a dream job, his life taking pictures of naked ladies isn't without its downside, as depicted in the slapstick opening credits in which clumsy models knock over Marks' cameras, he gets a pie in the face for trying to touch up one of his subjects, and accidentally snapping a girl in a park causes him to be chased by her boyfriend Burt. Worried that his ancestors' bad luck is rubbing off on him, Marks tells the psychiatrist stories about how his ancestors have also suffered misfortune through the ages-mainly because of their involvement with nude women and "the arts".

=== Story #1: "The Stone Age" ===
Marks’ first anecdote takes place in the prehistoric age. Sculptor "Harry Stone Marks", fresh from carving Stonehenge, is employed to draw a cavewoman housewife in the nude (in slate) only to end up pelted with rocks when her husband takes a fancy to Marks’ blonde secretary.

=== Story #2: "The Egyptian Age" ===
In ancient Egypt, Harrison Hubergritz a lowly Jewish slave is ordered by Pharaoh Akenaten to spend a lifetime painting the Pharaoh's harem, symbolized by the accumulation of a powdered beard. After finally completing his masterpiece Hubergritz accidentally knocks his pyramid home down causing himself and the girls to be buried under a hail of boulders.

=== Story #3: "China" ===
In Ancient China, the Fu-Manchu like "Ha-Ri-Son" an oriental offshoot of the Marks family, curses his wife when he finds her in the arms of the gardener (S'Zeto).

=== Story #4: "Greece" ===
An elderly Greek scholar, who constructs nude statues, has the misfortune to fall in love with every model he meets.

=== Story #5: "The Cavaliers" ===
Set during the Oliver Cromwell era. While staying at the manor house of Sir Rupert, Harrison De Chandelier, a renowned painter of nudes is asked to paint a portrait of the lady of the house. Unfortunately roundhead soldiers appear at the Manor, and their leader orders the painting be destroyed and its creator put in the stocks.

This is a semi-remake of one of Marks earlier 8mm glamour films called "The Bare Truth" in which Stuart Samuels played the Max Wall role.

=== Story #6 "The Theater" ===
In Victorian England, music hall impresario "The Great Marko", is down on his luck. However a chance meeting with a Cockney cleaning lady – who he imagines topless – provides Marko with the idea of presenting a show based around "Living Statues". A pre-striptease concept of women posing motionless in the nude. The show is a great success however on the verge of making his fortune Marko is arrested on obscenity charges. The mere mention of "Living Statues" causes the Judge in charge of the case to imagine himself running around naked – save for a judges wig – and ravishing one of Marko's models. Passing sentence on the buck-toothed impresario, the judge gives him a knowing wink and fines him 7’6 pence.

Marks distinct buck teeth and wig disguise in this episode was later re-used when Marks played Cornelius Clapworthy in Come Play With Me (1977). Marks’ daughter Josephine Harrison Marks plays the baby girl in this episode, and appears visibly distressed by her fathers made-up appearance.

=== Story #7 "The Poet" ===
Poet Byron Marks waxes lyrically about nudes.

=== Story #8 "The Old Dark House" ===
Marks plays "Professor Frankenstein Harrison Marks".

=== Story #9 "The Future" ===
Finally Marks imagines a space age future where women dress in leather and (in the context of the sexes) also wear the trousers. Men played by the same grunting cavemen seen in the first story, are whipped and forced to grovel at the feet of the Space Leader. This is the only story in which Marks does not feature in one of the roles.

== Cast ==
- Bruno Elrington as cave man
- June Palmer as cave woman
- Julian Orchard as pharaoh
- Max Bacon as Jossel
- Max Wall as witchfinder
- Cardew Robinson as Harry
- Oliver Mcgreavy as Hargreaves
- Harrison Marks as himself and his ancestors
- Rita Webb
- Charles Gray

== Production ==
Originally entitled The Seven Ages of Nakedness, a title inspired by John Gielgud’s one man show The Ages of Man, in order to increase the film’s running time two more stories/ages had to be added.

The film's publicity materials claimed the film featured "150 topless international lovelies." However, as several female cast members make repeat performances in several of the film's stories, that number might be an exaggeration.

== Reception ==
The Monthly Film Bulletin wrote: "A series of excruciatingly corny sketches involving Harrison Marks in a number of guises through the ages. The acting, much of it by Mr. Marks himself, is as feeble and embarrassing as the general level of invention – the Stone Age, for instance, has a girl in a topless loincloth turning from her stone television set to look up sculptor Harry Stone Marks' number (Stonehenge 3) in a stone telephone directory. A crass reference to Blow-Up at the beginning suggests a semi-serious intent, but what follows is no more than an excuse for the parade of topless models who figure prominently throughout."

== Releases ==
Not long after he completed the film, Marks declared bankruptcy and sold all rights to it. The film is not owned by Marks's estate, and the current rights owner is unknown. A DVD of the film was released in America in 2006; however, this release was unauthorized.

The film was released on UK video three times during the early 1980s, the releases containing a more explicit version of the film than had been shown in cinemas in 1969. However this version was also cut for length, reducing the running time from 95 minutes to 84 minutes. Omitted completely was the "Old Dark House" story as well as Rita Webb’s role. Footage from the "Future" sequence was also deleted, including the punch line. Clips of some of the missing footage in this story were used in the 1995 BBC documentary Doing Rude Things.

The same cut down for length version was later released on US DVD.
