= Susie Silvey =

English actress, dancer and model (born 1956)

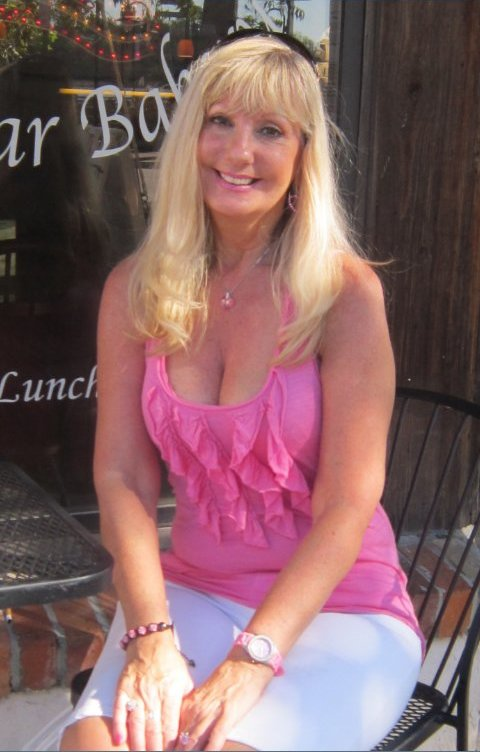
- Silvey in 2012
- Born: Susan Silvey; 17 September 1956 (age 70); London, England
- Education: Harrow School of Art
- Occupations: Actress; dancer; model
- Children: 1 daughter

Susan "Susie" Silvey (born 17 September 1956), occasionally Suzie Silvey, is an English actress, dancer and model, active in the 1970s and 1980s.

== Early life ==
Silvey attended the Harrow School of Art, where she studied ballet for five years, jazz and tap dancing for three years. She later was a dancer on Top of the Pops (TOTP) in the 1980s.

== Career ==
=== Television work ===
Appearances include The Dick Emery Show (1980), Terry and June (1980), The Hitchhiker's Guide to the Galaxy (1981), Emery Presents: Legacy of Murder (1982), Smiley's People (1982), Jemima Shore Investigates (1983) and Never the Twain (1983).

Other television work includes the Stanley Baxter Show, the Kenny Everett Show, the Dave Allen Show, The Professionals, The Kelly Monteith Show, Cannon and Ball, Sorry!, Little and Large, Cuffy, The Two Ronnies, EastEnders, Harry Enfield's Television Programme, The Les Dawson Show, The Chinese Detective, The Late, Late Breakfast Show, The Bill and Rumpole of the Bailey.

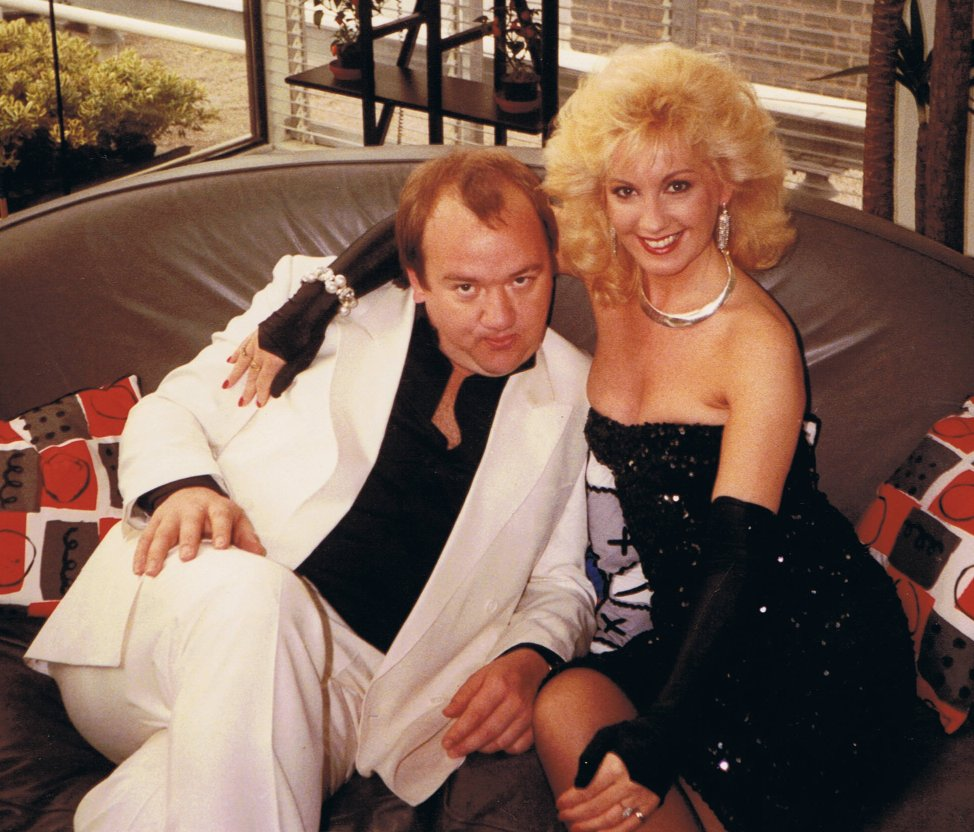
Silvey with Mel Smith in the 1980s

=== Film work ===
Her film credits include roles in Come Play with Me (1977), The Playbirds (1978), The Stud (1978), The World Is Full of Married Men (1979), Can I Come Too? (1979), The Long Good Friday (1980), Sex with the Stars (1980), Xtro (1983), Fanny Hill (1983), Blue Ice (1992), Shining Through (1992) and Splitting Heirs (1993). She appeared in silhouette as a roller skater in the opening titles of Octopussy (1983). Silvey also appeared in music videos for Paul McCartney, the Cure and the Joe Cocker video for 'Civilized Man' (1984).

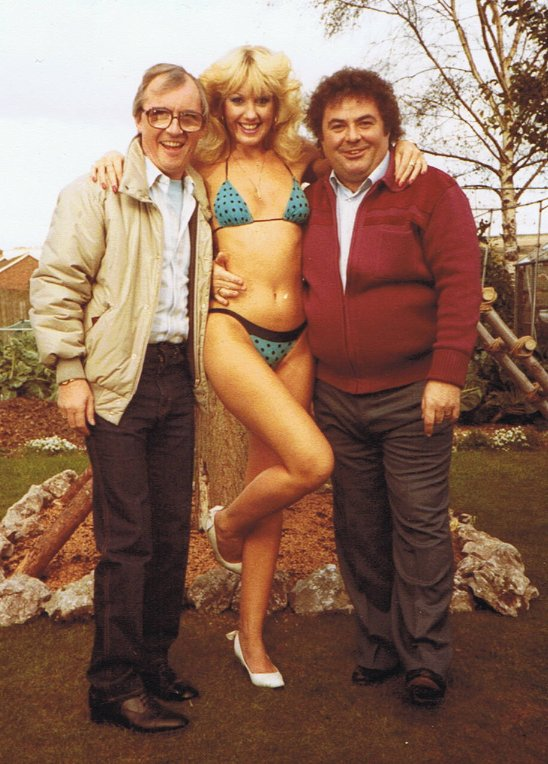
With Little and Large

=== Present day ===
Silvey is on the Committee of the Celebrities Guild of Great Britain and is a member of the Heritage Foundation, which involve her arranging celebrity guests for fund-raising events and blue plaque unveiling. She was present at the unveiling of blue plaques to Jet Harris, Robin Gibb, and Morecambe and Wise unveiled at Teddington Studios in May 2013.

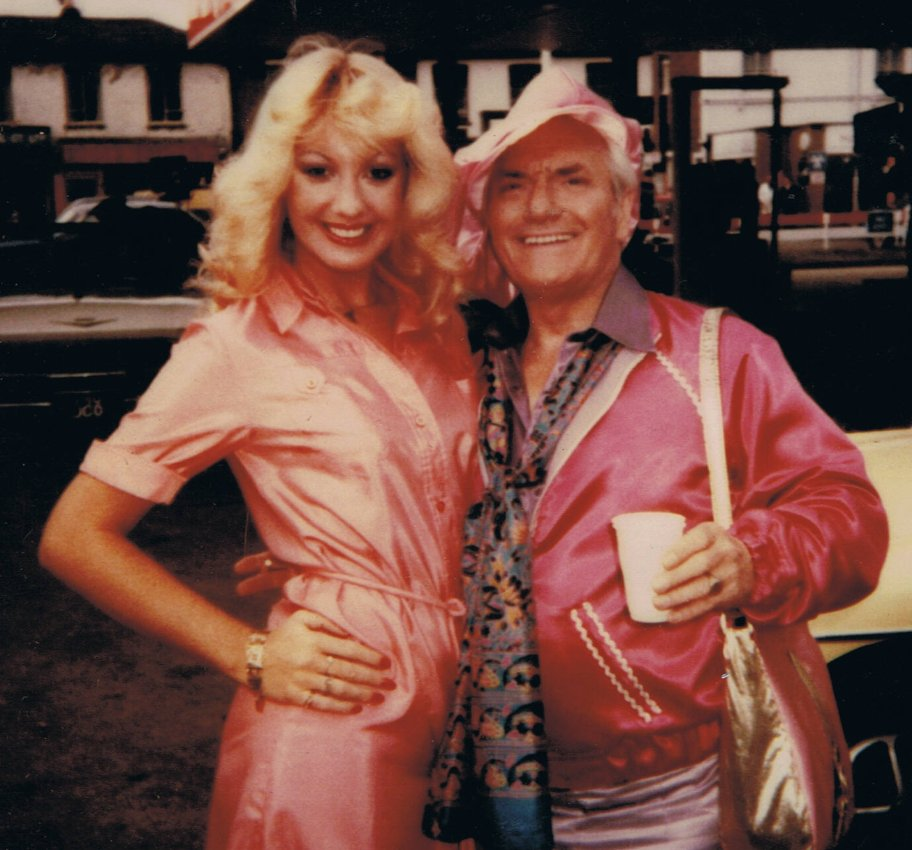
Silvey during filming with Dick Emery in the 1980s

In August 2012 she appeared in an episode of Cash in the Attic with her daughter, Sarah Silvey-Fine. In November 2020 she appeared in Channel 5's documentary Dick Emery's Comedy Gold.
