= For Whom the Bell Tolls (TV series) =

- Genre: Drama
- Based on: For Whom the Bell Tolls by Ernest Hemingway
- Written by: Giles Cooper
- Directed by: Rex Tucker
- Starring: John Ronane; Ann Bell; Glynn Edwards; Joan Miller; Michael Graham Cox
- Composer: Robert Gerhard
- Country of origin: United Kingdom
- Original language: English
- No. of series: 1
- No. of episodes: 4 (all missing)

Production
- Producer: Douglas Allen
- Running time: 45 minutes
- Production company: BBC

Original release
- Network: BBC2
- Release: 2 October – 23 October 1965

For Whom the Bell Tolls is a British television series first aired by BBC in 1965, based on the 1940 novel by Ernest Hemingway. It stars John Ronane, Ann Bell, Glynn Edwards and Joan Miller. The film was adapted for television by Giles Cooper, was produced by Douglas Allen, and was directed by Rex Tucker. It consisted of four 45-minute episodes, the first of which aired on 2 October 1965. The last episode aired 23 October 1965. According to the BBC archives none of the episodes of the film still exist.

It was the first British television adaptation of a Hemingway novel. Robert Gerhard composed music for the adaptation that incorporated the guitar.

== Episode list ==
- Reconnaissance - 2 October 1965
- The Moon of May - 9 October 1965
- Verdict on Pablo - 16 October 1965
- The Bridge - 23 October 1965

== Cast ==
- John Ronane as Robert Jordan
- Ann Bell as Maria
- Glynn Edwards as Pablo
- Joan Miller as Pilar
- Michael Graham Cox as Andres
- Michael Mellinger as Rafael
- John Tate as Agustin
- Richard Beale as Anselmo
- Philip Madoc as Fernando
- Reg Lye as Primitivo
- John Bryans as General Golz
- Andre Van Gyseghem as Karkov
- Robert James as Lieutenant Berrendo
- Mark Dignam as El Sordo
- Peter Kriss as Joaquin
- Marne Maitland as Captain Mora
- Wolfe Morris as Kashkin
- Alan Lake as Corporal
- Julian Curry as Ivan
- Alex McAvoy as Soldier
- Thomas Heathcote as Gomez
- Nicholas Amer as Corporal

== Reception ==
The theatre arts professor Thomas S. Hischak called the 1965 adaptation "the most complete" and wrote, "The cast of characters, little known outside the United Kingdom, were adequate even if none looked or sounded remotely Spanish." The Stage and Television Today critic Bill Edmund wrote, "This four-part serial ended with the blowing up of the bridge, leaving Robert Jordan (John Ronane)—the blower-upper—lying dead. The whole episode had a musical comedy or operatic flavour and I half expected all concerned to take time off from fighting and sing a song." The Stage and Television Today critic Kari Anderson called the For Whom the Bell Tolls adaptation "deadly-dull", while the critics Leslie Halliwell and Philip Purser said, "Despite the good actor John Ronane as the hero Robert Jordan, For Whom the Bell Tolls was a turkey."
