= Norman Vaughan (comedian) =

English comedian (1923–2002)

- Born: Norman Edward Vaughan; 10 April 1923; Liverpool, England
- Died: 17 May 2002 (aged 79); London, England
- Occupation: Comedian
- Spouse: Bernice
- Children: 1

Norman Edward Vaughan (10 April 1923 – 17 May 2002) was an English comedian who led a long and successful career in the television and theatre, appearing occasionally in films.

== Early life ==
Vaughan was born in Liverpool and began a stage career at the age of 14 with a boys' theatrical troupe, the Eton Boys Choir, singing "D'ye ken John Peel". A few years later, he formed a dance trio called The Dancing Aces, and toured with it until he was called up to the join the Army in 1945. He served as a sergeant in Italy and the Middle East. During his military service he appeared in Army shows with Spike Milligan and Harry Secombe, who were later to form the Goons. In 1951, he appeared with Secombe again, when they performed on the same bill in variety.

After two years of doing variety shows in Australia, Vaughan returned to Britain to appear in a summer season of shows called Twinkle. By the end of the decade he was the compere of a show starring Cliff Richard.

== Television career ==
Vaughan was by now becoming known as an entertainer and his big break came when he stepped into Bruce Forsyth's shoes to host Sunday Night at the London Palladium. The show was broadcast live and was a national institution, often reaching 20 million viewers. Vaughan used catchphrases like "swinging!" and "dodgy!", which were accompanied by thumbs-up or thumbs-down gestures. He was a popular host for the long-running television programme (1962–1965). He also hosted The Golden Shot (during 1972 and 1973), taking over from Bob Monkhouse after the former host was fired for allegedly accepting bribes. Vaughan appeared in a 1960s TV advertising campaign for Cadbury's Roses chocolates which included the slogan "Roses Grow On You".

On television, he was also a regular guest on variety and quiz shows, including Celebrity Squares, Give Us a Clue and Larry Grayson's Generation Game, as well as being compere of the BBC's Pebble Mill Showcase. He was also known in the making of the popular TV game show "Bullseye"

== Theatre career ==
Vaughan had already launched a successful career as an actor before achieving success as a comedian. His stage appearances include In Order of Appearance at the Chichester Festival Theatre, a tour of Calamity Jane with Barbara Windsor and the farces A Bedful of Foreigners and No Sex Please, We're British. He also appeared in a number of pantomimes.

== Later years ==
Vaughan devised the television game show Bullseye (1981), which was presented by Jim Bowen. He made few television or film appearances after 1974, other than appearing as himself in the Southern Television show Tell Me Another (1976–1979); as a seaside entertainer in the sex comedy Come Play with Me (1977); again as himself in Hear My Song (1991); and featuring in a TV tribute to Sir Harry Secombe (2001).

== Death ==
He died, aged 79, in the Royal London Hospital in East London, on 17 May 2002, from injuries sustained in a road accident on 17 April at Waterloo Bridge. He was cremated at Golders Green Crematorium in North London on 23 May 2002. His ashes are in the Southern Garden (Bed L) but he has a memorial plaque in the West Memorial Court.

== Personal life ==
Vaughan was married to Bernice, a former dancer, and they had one son, David.

== Selected filmography ==
- You Must Be Joking! (1965)
- Doctor in Clover (1966)
- Twinky (1969)
- Come Play with Me (1977)
- Hear My Song (1991)

== Catchphrases ==
- Thumb up – "Swinging"; thumb down – "Dodgy".
