= Legacy of Murder =

1982 British TV series

- Also known as: Emery Presents: Legacy of Murder
- Genre: Comedy
- Written by: John Singer; Steven Singer
- Starring: Dick Emery; Barry Evans; Richard Vernon; Thomas Baptiste
- Country of origin: United Kingdom
- Original language: English
- No. of series: 1
- No. of episodes: 6

Production
- Producer: Harold Snoad
- Cinematography: Eugene Carr
- Editors: John Dunstan; Mike Jackson
- Running time: 30 minutes
- Production company: BBC

Original release
- Network: BBC One
- Release: 16 February – 23 March 1982

Related
- Jack of Diamonds

Legacy of Murder is a British comedy television series that originally aired on BBC in six half-hour episodes between 16 February and 23 March 1982. A struggling London private detective and his assistant are hired by a lawyer to locate six people concerned with the inheritance of an eccentric aristocrat. It is also known as Emery Presents: Legacy of Murder. As he did on The Dick Emery Show, Emery portrayed several different characters. It was followed by a loose sequel Jack of Diamonds in 1983.

== Partial Cast ==
- Dick Emery as Bernie Weinstock/Various characters
- Barry Evans as Robin Bright
- Richard Vernon as Roland Tolhurst
- Delia Paton as Miss Stevens
- Robert Mill as Desmond Danvers-Crichton
- Martin Wimbush as Clive Danvers-Crichton
- Thomas Baptiste as O'Toole
- Lee Whitlock as Wayne
- Patsy Rowlands as Thelma
- Colin Fay as Sid
- Jim Dowdall as Suleiman
- Barbara Murray as Sarah
- Eddie Tagoe as Baron Climeterre
- Glyn Edwards as Henchman
- John Horsley as Retired Headmaster
- Roy Kinnear as dad of bovver boy
- Barbara Hicks as the school secretary
- Susie Silvey as The stripper
- Irene Handl as Cousin Looby
