= June Palmer =

British model (1940–2004)

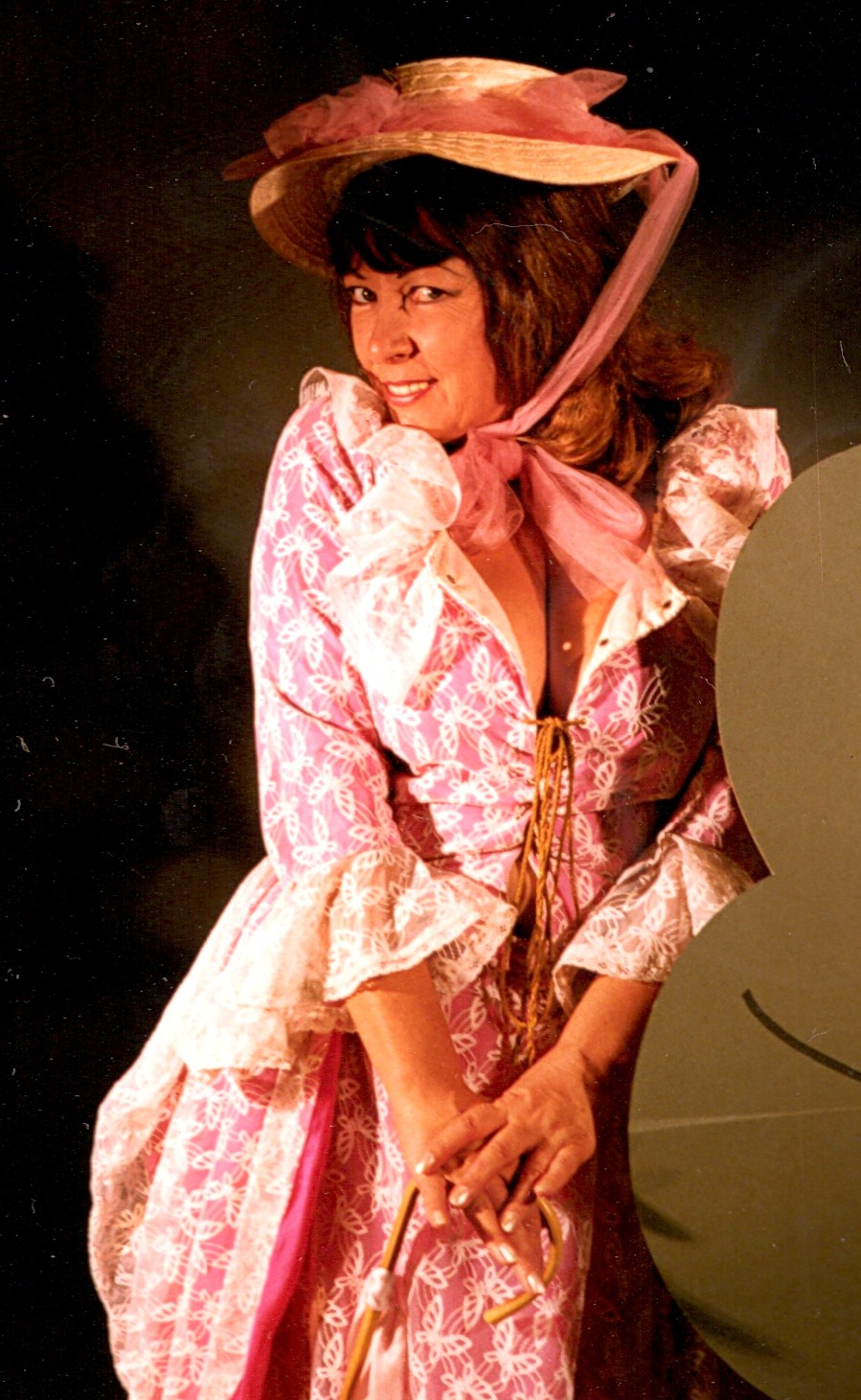
- Palmer in 1985, dressed up as Little Bo-Peep
- Born: 1 August 1940; London, England
- Died: 6 January 2004 (aged 63); London, England
- Other name: June Power
- Citizenship: UK
- Occupations: Glamour model; actress
- Years active: 1950s–1980s
- Known for: Glamour modeling
- Spouse: Arthur Howell (m. 1964; div. 2000)

June Palmer (1 August 1940 – 6 January 2004), also known as "June Power", was an English model and actress who, along with Pamela Green, was the most famous Harrison Marks glamour model of the 1960s. Palmer was featured in Harrison Marks's publications Kamera and Solo, and in his short films that feature nudity.

== Career ==
June Palmer was born on 1 August 1940 in London, England. In 1959, during her late teens, she began working as a topless dancer at the Windmill Theatre in London and started modelling professionally in the late 1950s. She appeared in 8mm glamour films made by George Harrison Marks (Note: Flesh and Fantasie; Nightmare at Elm Manor; Photo Session; Star Strip; Dream Goddess; China Garden and The Naked World of June Palmer), Russell Gay (Note: So Fur, So Good and Beauty and the Barn), Express Films (Note: Body Beautiful) and Arthur Howell (Note: June in Orbit, Calamity June and Special Agent). She later played minor parts in movies, including The Naked World of Harrison Marks (1966), Taste the Blood of Dracula (1969), The Nine Ages of Nakedness (1969), Games That Lovers Play (1971) and On the Game (1974). Palmer stopped modelling for magazines in 1970 but continued to do some private modelling for London camera clubs until 1987.

Photographer Irv Carsten spoke about Palmer in the March 1962 issue of Modern Man: "I felt ashamed using an automatic camera. Her posing is second nature, she's beautiful from any angle, and without camera settings to make, there's nothing to do but watch."

== Personal life ==
In 1964, at 24 years old, Palmer married the 44-year-old photographer-stuntman Arthur Howell. In the 1960s, they started and ran Strobe Studios in Clapham, South London, a London County Council (LCC)-licensed model agency and photographic studio that was advertised in many photography magazines such as Practical Photography. Palmer divorced Howell in 2000 and later married again. She died on 6 January 2004.
