= Whitehouse (magazine) =

British pornographic magazine

- Cover of Whitehouse magazine No. 84, published January 1982
- Categories: Pornographic men's
- Publisher: David Sullivan / Gold Star Publications
- First issue: 1974
- Final issue: 2008
- Country: United Kingdom
- Language: English

Whitehouse magazine, also known as Whitehouse International, was a British pornographic magazine billed as "The International Quality Glamour Magazine". Launched in 1974, it was substantially more explicit than its predecessors, showing uncensored images of genitalia.

The magazine was originally published by David Sullivan and was one of his most successful publications. But by 2001, annual sales had declined to around £250,000 and that year he sold the title and others in his stable to his business partners David and Ralph Gold, under their Gold Star Publications name. Related publications included Teenage Hardcore and Derriere. Whitehouse ceased publication in 2008.

Although reputed to have been named after anti-pornography campaigner Mary Whitehouse, the magazine contained a disclaimer saying that its name had nothing to do with her.

The model Mary Millington made numerous appearances in the magazine.

The industrial music band Whitehouse are named after the magazine.

== See also ==
- List of pornographic magazines
- Outline of British pornography
- Pornography in the United Kingdom
