= Alan Lake =

English actor (1940–1984)

- Lake in 1964
- Born: 24 November 1940; Stoke-on-Trent, Staffordshire, England
- Died: 10 October 1984 (aged 43); Sunningdale, Berkshire, England
- Resting place: Sunningdale Catholic Cemetery
- Occupation: Actor
- Years active: 1964–1984
- Spouse: Diana Dors (m. 1968; died 1984)
- Children: 2

Alan Lake (24 November 1940 – 10 October 1984) was an English actor and the third and final husband of screen star Diana Dors.

== Biography ==
Alan Lake was born in Stoke-on-Trent, Staffordshire on 24 November 1940, raised in the city's Milton district, and attended Endon School.

He studied acting at RADA and began to work in television roles in 1964.

He was the third husband of the actress Diana Dors, whom he met on the set of the 1968 television series The Inquisitors. He was initially not keen on Dors; his reaction on finding that he would be working with her was, "Oh no, not Madame Tits and Lips!", but within days, they had fallen in love and were married on 23 November 1968. Their stormy marriage produced a son, Jason David Dors Lake (11 November 1969 – 14 November 2019). Lake also had a daughter, Catherine Emma, born in 1967 with casting director Pamela Brown. Diana and Alan worked together in the early 1970s, on stage in plays such as Three Months Gone, for which Dors received her best critical reviews since Yield to the Night. They also received an offer to appear together in a TV sitcom, Queenie's Castle.

In July 1970, Lake was involved in a pub brawl for which he was sentenced to 18 months in prison, although he was released after serving a year. His friend, the singer Leapy Lee, was sentenced to three years for unlawfully wounding the pub's relief manager and was also released after a year. Lake was a keen horseman, and on his release from prison Dors presented him with a mare named Sapphire. In 1972, Lake was unseated when the horse ran into the bough of a tree. His back was broken, and initially it was thought he might spend the rest of his life in a wheelchair, but he was walking again within three weeks. After leaving hospital, unable to work while he recovered, and in severe pain, he began drinking heavily. Dors said of him at this time: "alcohol had unleashed a monster, uncontrollable and frightening".

Lake began hallucinating and experiencing psychotic episodes, but was diverted from drinking after becoming a Roman Catholic, also convincing Dors to follow him in adopting the faith. In 1974, Dors was rushed to hospital suffering from meningitis, and Lake fainted when he was told that she might not survive the night. In 1975, within months of her illness, at the age of 43, Dors became pregnant with their second child and was advised by doctors to have an abortion, but because of her newly adopted religion and regret at two previous abortions, she decided to go ahead with the pregnancy. She miscarried, which led Lake to return to heavy drinking.

For the remainder of the 1970s, Lake's once promising acting career was reduced to appearances in low-budget comedy films and small parts in television dramas. However, in 1974, he had a significant role as singer Jack Daniels in the Slade vehicle Slade In Flame, and also as John Merrick in the first episode of the hugely popular TV series The Sweeney. Both he and Dors attended the Slade in Flame premiere at the Metropole Theatre, Victoria, London, on 13 February 1975.

In 1980, the pair separated for a time, although they were reconciled when Lake promised to undergo treatment for his alcoholism. Lake's acting work became less frequent in the 1980s, and Dors's health began to deteriorate. She was diagnosed with ovarian cancer in 1982, and died in May 1984. Lake then burned all of Dors's clothes, and fell into a depression. On 10 October 1984, five months after Dors's death, and 16 years to the day since they had first met, he took their teenage son Jason to the railway station, returned to his Sunningdale home, and committed suicide by shooting himself in the mouth in their son's bedroom.

His television roles included Herrick in the Doctor Who story Underworld; and parts in Cluff, Redcap, Sergeant Cork, The Saint, Public Eye, The Avengers, Department S, Dixon of Dock Green, The Protectors, Z-Cars, Softly, Softly: Taskforce, Crown Court, The Sweeney, Angels, Target, Hazel, Strangers, Blake's 7, Juliet Bravo, The Gentle Touch, Hart to Hart, and Bergerac.

In 1969, he recorded a pop single, "Good Times"/"Got To Have Tenderness" (the former a cover of a song written by Harry Nilsson), which was released by Ember Records (EMBS 278).

== Acting roles ==
=== Film ===
- Catch Us If You Can, aka Having a Wild Weekend (1965) — Cameraman (uncredited)
- Sky West and Crooked, aka Gypsy Girl (1966) — Camlo
- The Christmas Tree (1966) — Truck Driver (uncredited)
- Charlie Bubbles (1967) — Airman
- Freelance (1971) — Dean
- Swedish Wildcats (1972) — Bodyguard
- Hide and Seek (1972) — Lorrimer
- Layout for 5 Models (1972) — Andy
- Percy's Progress (1974) — Derry Hogan
- The Swordsman (1974) — Reynaud Duval
- The Amorous Milkman (1975) — Sandy
- Slade In Flame (1975) — Jack Daniels
- The Office Party (1976) — Mr. Barnes
- The Playbirds (1978) — Harry Dougan
- Confessions from the David Galaxy Affair (1979) — David Galaxy
- Yesterday's Hero (1979) — Georgie Moore
- Don't Open Till Christmas (1984) — Giles Harrison

=== Television ===
- Z-Cars, episode "Two in the Bush"-(1964)-Joe
- Catch Hand, episode "Fifteen-Bob-An-Hour Men" (1964) — Charlie
- No Hiding Place, episode "Real Class" (1964) — Third Player
- The Wednesday Play: Wear a Very Big Hat (1965) — Harry Atkins
- Cluff, episode "The Village Constable" (1965) — Tod Meller
- Mary Barton (1964), 1 episode — Knobstick
- The Wednesday Play: Stand Up, Nigel Barton (1965) (TV)
- Hereward the Wake, four episodes (1965) — Edwin
- For Whom the Bell Tolls (1965), 1 episode — Corporal
- Redcap, episode "The Moneylenders" (1966) — Lance Corporal Farrington
- The Saint, episode "Locate and Destroy" (1966) — Jacob
- Thirteen Against Fate, episode "The Traveller" (1966) — Robert Eloi
- The Avengers, episode "The House That Jack Built" (1966) — Prison Officer (uncredited)
- Thirty-Minute Theatre, episode "The Wake" (1967)
- The Wednesday Play: Dial Rudolph Valentino One One (1967) — Con
- Z-Cars, episode "She's Not Yours, She's Mine: Part 2" (1967) — Speedy
- Public Eye, episode "It Must Be the Architecture – Can't Be the Climate" (1968) — Murchinson
- Thief (1968)
- The Avengers, episode "The Forget-Me-Knot" (1968) — Karl
- A Bit of Crucifixion, Father (1968) — Gilbert
- Dixon of Dock Green, episode "A Quiet Sunday" (1968) — Kimber
- Dixon of Dock Green, episode "No Love Lost" (1969) — Keith Proctor
- The Contenders (miniseries, 1969) — Tom Stocker
- Department S, episode "Dead Men Die Twice" (1969) — The Dandy
- Dixon of Dock Green, episode "The Informant" (1972) — Dennis Brown
- The Protectors, episode "See No Evil" (1972) — Thug
- The Adventurer, episode "Icons Are Forever" (1973) — Carlo
- Z-Cars, episode "Hi-Jack" (1973) — Brian Peake
- Dixon of Dock Green, episode "Knocker" (1974) — Jimmy Goddard
- Softly, Softly: Task Force, episode "See What You've Done" (1974) — Richard Spencer
- The Sweeney, episode "The Ringer" (1975) — Merrick
- Crown Court, episode "Two in the Mind of One" (1975)
- Z-Cars, episode "Tonight and Every Night" (1975) — Danny
- Dixon of Dock Green, episode "Domino" (1976) — Ron Mason
- Angels, episode "Celebration" (1976) — Tony
- Target, episode "Lady Luck" (1977) — Swain
- Z-Cars, episode "Error of Judgement" (1977) — Stan
- Doctor Who, episode Underworld (1978) — Herrick
- Play for Today: "Destiny" (1978) — Monty Goodman
- Hazell, episode "Hazell Settles the Accounts" (1978) — Creasey
- Z-Cars, episode "Driver" (1978) — George Armstrong
- The Black Stuff (1980) — Dominic
- Blake's 7, episode "Aftermath" (1980) — Chel
- Rumpole of the Bailey: "Rumpole's Return" (1980) — Meacher
- Juliet Bravo, episode "Trouble at T'Mill" (1980) — Ted Galway
- The Olympian Way (1981)
- Dick Turpin, episode "The Secret Folk" (1982) — Zsika
- The Gentle Touch, episode "Joker" (1982) — Malcolm Webster
- Juliet Bravo, episode "A Breach of the Peace" (1982) — Tom Tully
- Hart to Hart, episode "Passing Chance" (1983) — Nick
- Bergerac, episode "Tug of War" (1984) — Jack Broughton
- Juliet Bravo, episode "Work Force" (1984) — Grogan
- Hammer House of Mystery and Suspense: "Paint Me a Murder" (1984) — Davey
