= Confessions from the David Galaxy Affair =

1979 British sexploitation comedy film by Willy Roe

- Theatrical release poster
- Directed by: Willy Roe
- Written by: Joe Ireland
- Produced by: Willy Roe; David Sullivan (executive producer)
- Starring: Alan Lake; Glynn Edwards; Mary Millington
- Cinematography: Douglas Hill
- Edited by: Jim Connock
- Music by: David Whitaker
- Production company: Roldvale Productions
- Distributed by: Tigon
- Release date: 28 June 1979
- Running time: 96 minutes
- Country: United Kingdom
- Language: English

Confessions from the David Galaxy Affair (also known as The David Galaxy Affair, and for its UK re-release, Star Sex) is a 1979 British sexploitation comedy film directed by Willy Roe and starring Alan Lake, Glynn Edwards, Mary Millington, Bernie Winters, Diana Dors and Anthony Booth.

The film was not part of the Confessions series of films from Columbia Pictures that began with Confessions of a Window Cleaner (1974), but it was hoped that it would benefit commercially from the similarity of its title.

== Plot ==
A playboy astrologer has to prove an alibi to police for a robbery that took place five years previously.

== Cast ==
- Alan Lake as David Galaxy
- Glynn Edwards as Chief Inspector Evans
- Mary Millington as Millicent Cumming
- Bernie Winters as Mr. Pringle
- Anthony Booth as Steve
- Diana Dors as Jenny Stride
- Kenny Lynch as Joe
- Rosemary England as Sandra
- John Moulder-Brown as Sergeant Johnson
- Alec Mango as Pembleton
- Queenie Watts as David Galaxy's mother
- Ballard Berkeley as Judge
- Milton Reid as Eddie
- Sally Faulkner as Amanda
- Lindy Benson as Evelyn
- Valerie Minifie as Sylvia
- Pamela Healey as Miss Uncliffe
- Cindy Truman as Anne
- Vicki Scott as Charlotte
- Maria Parkinson as Susan MP
- George Lewis as George
- John M. East as Willie

== Production ==
The film was financed by businessman David Sullivan to promote the career of Millington, who was his girlfriend at the time. Millington died a few weeks after the film's release.

Diana Dors performed the film's theme song over the opening titles.

The British Board of Film Classification described the film as "a piece of self-indulgence" and "an unmannerly and vulgar display".

== Release ==
The film opened in London on 28 June 1979 at the Eros cinema in Piccadilly Circus and at the Classic, Praed Street.

The film was Sullivan's first box-office flop, being released at a period when soft porn theatrical films were losing their popularity in Britain.

== Critical reception ==
The Monthly Film Bulletin wrote: "With its barely identifiable semblance of plot, a level of comic invention exemplified by having the hero interrupt his love-making by breaking wind, and a dramatic context that amounts to little but the endless offering and pouring of drinks, this erotic 'thriller' proves squalidly unwatchable."
