= Mary Millington =

English model and pornographic actress (1945–1979)

- Millington in The Playbirds (1978)
- Born: Mary Ruth Quilter; 30 November 1945; Kenton, Middlesex, England
- Died: 19 August 1979 (aged 33); Walton-on-the-Hill, Surrey, England
- Other names: Nancy Astley; Susan David; Janet Green; Samantha Jones; Karen Young; Marion Ellis; Sally Stevens; Sally Stephens; Rebecca Stephens; June Taylor; Rebecca Wilkinson
- Occupations: Model; call girl; pornographic actress
- Height: 4 ft 11 in (1.50 m)
- Spouse: Robert Maxted (m. 1964)

Mary Ruth Maxted (née Quilter; 30 November 1945 – 19 August 1979), known professionally as Mary Millington from 1974 onwards, was an English model, call girl and pornographic actress. Her appearance in the short softcore film Sex is My Business led to her meeting magazine publisher David Sullivan, who promoted her widely as a model and featured her in the 1977 softcore comedy Come Play with Me, which ran for a record-breaking four years at the Moulin Cinema in Great Windmill Street, Soho.

In her later years, she faced depression and pressure from frequent police raids on her sex shop. After a downward spiral of drug addiction, shoplifting and debt, she died at home of an overdose of medicine and vodka, aged 33.

Millington has been described as one of the "two hottest British sex film stars of the seventies", the other being Fiona Richmond.

== Early life ==
Mary Ruth Quilter was born on 30 November 1945, and was raised by her single mother, Joan Quilter (1914–1976), initially in the London suburb of Willesden. In 1959, when Mary was 13, Joan and Mary moved to Mid Holmwood near Dorking, Surrey.

Largely growing up without her father, John William G. Klein (1899–1973), Mary was bullied at school because her parents were unmarried, and suffered from low self-esteem throughout her childhood and teenage years. She left school at the age of 15 in 1961, and in 1964, aged 18, married Robert Maxted and settled in Dorking. She spent more than a decade caring for her terminally ill mother, and later entered the pornography industry to help pay for her mother's care.

Millington had originally hoped to become a fashion model, but at 4 feet 11 inches she did not meet the industry's height requirements. Instead, she became a glamour model in the late 1960s.

== Career ==
Soon after starting work as a glamour model, she met the glamour photographer and pornographer John Jesnor Lindsay, who offered to photograph her for softcore magazines. She became one of his most popular models and began appearing in 8mm hardcore pornographic film loops which sold well in Europe. One of her first films was Miss Bohrloch (Note: German: bohrloch lit. 'borehole') (1970) which won the Golden Phallus Award at the Wet Dream Festival held in November 1970 in Amsterdam. She starred in around twenty short hardcore films for Lindsay, although only five (Miss Bohrloch, Oral Connection, Betrayed, Oh Nurse and Special Assignment) have so far resurfaced. She then returned to modelling for British pornographic magazines such as Knave and Men Only. She also appeared in softcore short films by Russell Gay (Response, 1974), Mountain Films (Love Games, Wild Lovers) and Harrison Marks (Sex is My Business, c. 1974).

Sex is My Business was shot late on a Saturday night at a sex shop on London's Coventry Street. The storyline concerned a powerful aphrodisiac being dropped by a customer, the potency of which renders the shop's staff and customers sex crazy. Mary, dressed in a short see-through dress, is the film's main focus of attention, playing a member of staff who drags a customer into the back room for some multi-position sex, thoughtfully turning on the shop's CCTV camera so others can watch. Sex is My Business was considered something of a lost film until a Super 8 print was located and privately transferred to DVD in 2008. The film subsequently made its internet debut on 26 July 2008 at the (now defunct) site ZDD Visual Explosion. In 2010, Sex is My Business was included as a special feature on the DVD re-release of Come Play with Me.

In February 1974, Maureen O’Malley, her co-star in Sex is My Business, introduced her to adult magazine publisher David Sullivan. Although she was still married, the pair became lovers. Mary had used various stage names and aliases during her pornography career until 1974, when Sullivan rebranded her as Mary Millington. In her first appearance in Sullivan's Whitehouse magazine, he claimed that she was the bisexual nymphomaniac sister of the magazine's editor Doreen Millington, which led Mary to her new stage name. She became well-known thanks to her appearances in Sullivan's pornographic magazines such as Whitehouse and Private. She soon became the most popular model in any of Sullivan's magazines. In November 1977, magistrates acquitted her and Sullivan following prosecution under the Obscene Publications Acts.

She had a small part in Sullivan's 1977 softcore sex comedy Come Play with Me, alongside Alfie Bass and Irene Handl. Although critically panned, the film was highly successful, running continuously for four years at one London cinema. It then became one of the first British films to sell in large numbers on the new VHS format. This was followed by a larger role in The Playbirds (1978), in which she was cast as a policewoman working undercover as a nude model. Although her lack of acting training was evident, The Playbirds was a commercial success. Like Come Play with Me, it was extensively trailed in Sullivan's magazines. She made many public appearances at this time, promoting her films in regional cinemas, opening shops and restaurants, and raising money for the People's Dispensary for Sick Animals. At the height of her fame, she was also working behind the counter in Sullivan's sex shops from 1974 to 1978, mainly in the Whitehouse shop in Norbury, South London. She continued working as a call girl, which she had done since her early modelling days in 1967. She then made a cameo appearance in Confessions from the David Galaxy Affair (1979), which was a flop, and she played the title role in Queen of the Blues (1979). She appeared in other sex movies such as Eskimo Nell (1975), Intimate Games (1976) and Derek Ford's What's Up Superdoc! (1978).

In April 1978, Millington and fellow Come Play With Me actress Suzy Mandel took part in a publicity stunt for the anniversary of the opening of the film at the Moulin Cinema, posing in lingerie on the cinema's marquee. In May 1978, Millington was photographed topless outside 10 Downing Street. While she was posing for an innocuous picture with a policeman, she decided to unzip her top and expose her breasts for the photograph. This surprised the people present, including Suzy Mandel, Whitehouse photographer George Richardson (who took the picture), and the policeman (who tried to confiscate the film). According to Simon Sheridan's biography of Millington, "For this stunt Mary was conditionally discharged and bound over to keep the peace".

The filming of Millington's last film appearance took place in early to mid-1978. She played Mary in the Sex Pistols film The Great Rock 'n' Roll Swindle, directed by Julien Temple, which was released theatrically in March 1980. However, neither she nor her punk rock co-star Sid Vicious lived to see the completion of the film. Liz Fraser, one of her co-stars in the film, remembered: "I was next to this girl called Mary Millington, and she and I had a great chat together… and then we went into the pub for a lunch, during the filming of that, and someone said 'she’s a porn star', and I said 'I don’t understand what do you mean' and he said 'porn, p-o-r-n' and he said 'she’s naked and she does everything in all these films', but she was lovely and so I met my first porn star".

Also in 1978, she was approached to appear in a hardcore porn film called Love is Beautiful, to have been directed by Gerard Damiano. However, despite Millington and Damiano being pictured together at that year's Cannes Film Festival, the film (meant to have been produced by David Grant's Oppidan Films) never materialised. Potential co-stars may have included Harry Reems, Gloria Brittain and Lisa Taylor. That same year she turned 33 and found herself being replaced by younger models in Sullivan's magazines.

== Advocacy, views and sexuality ==
Millington was an advocate for the legalisation of pornography, campaigned for the abolition of the Obscene Publications Act and promoted sexual openness and equality.

Millington self-identified as bisexual and said that she preferred lesbian sex.

Millington supported Fulham F.C.

== Last years and death ==
Millington had suffered from neurosis and depression, which were exacerbated by her cocaine habit. Her mother's death at age 62 on 17 May 1976, after over 10 years with cancer, also affected her deeply, and her behaviour became unpredictable, which led to her breaking up with Sullivan. In March 1978, she ceased to work in Sullivan's Whitehouse sex shop in Norbury and opened her own in Tooting, also in South London, called Mary Millington's International Sex Centre. She began to spend more time working in her own shop, selling illegal material. The shop was raided by the police on numerous occasions, and she claimed the police threatened her and forced her to pay protection money.

In the past, she had publicly criticised police raids on sex shops and published the addresses and telephone numbers of Scotland Yard, the Director of Public Prosecutions and Members of Parliament in her magazines. Her life began a downward spiral into drug use and depression following the raids on her shop. A few months prior to her death, she had received a large tax bill which she was unable to pay. Her kleptomania became more pronounced in the last year of her life, with arrests for shoplifting in June 1979 and again for stealing a necklace on 18 August 1979, which was the day before her death.

Millington died by suicide at age 33, by an overdose of tricyclic antidepressant anafranil, paracetamol and alcohol at her home in Walton-on-the-Hill, Surrey on 19 August 1979. Her husband found her dead in her bed. She left four suicide notes which were found near her body. In one of them, she had written: "The police have framed me yet again. They frighten me so much. I can't face the thought of prison... The Nazi tax man has finished me as well." In another note, to her solicitor Michael Kaye (partly published in Private magazine no 59), Millington wrote "the police have killed me with their threats…the police have made my life a misery with frame ups. The tax man has hounded me so much – I will be made bankrupt, he mustn't get anything of his £200,000 demands. He is a religious maniac." In another note, to David Sullivan, she wrote: "please print in your magazines how much I want porn to be legalised, but the police have beaten me."

In the mid 1970s, Millington became one of the earliest members of the English Collective of Prostitutes (ECP) and of the National Campaign for the Reform of the Obscene Publications Acts (NCROPA), with Millington encouraging her readers to demand the abolition of the Acts. From the late 1970s, NCROPA was affiliated to the National Council for Civil Liberties (NCCL). After Millington's death in August 1979, NCROPA founder David Webb wrote: "Mary was a dear, kind person and we much admired her courage in standing up to the bigotry and repression which still so pervades the establishment of this country. She obviously had tremendous pressures put on her as a result and there is no doubt in my mind that these must have contributed to this tragedy."

Millington was buried at St Mary Magdalene Church, in South Holmwood, Surrey, marked by a grey granite tombstone which bears her married name. She is buried in the same grave as her mother, Joan Quilter, who died in 1976.

== Legacy ==
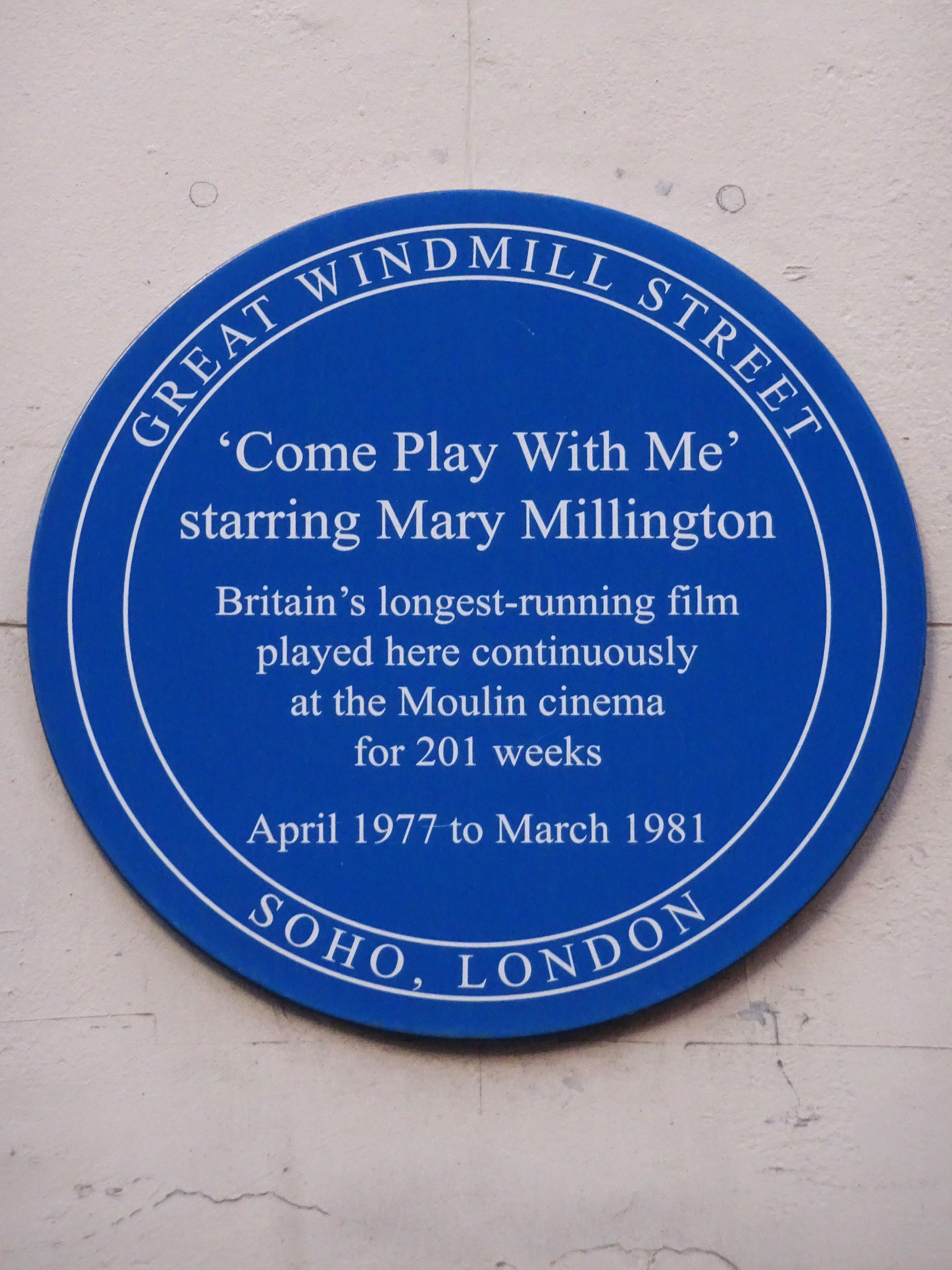
A blue plaque in London, England commemorating Come Play with Me and Mary Millington

Millington has been described as one of the "two hottest British sex film stars of the seventies", the other being Fiona Richmond. David Sullivan described her as "the only really uninhibited, natural sex symbol that Britain ever produced and who believed in what she did". Between 1975 and 1982, there was always at least one of Millington's films playing in London's West End.

A posthumous film about her life was released in 1980, entitled Mary Millington's True Blue Confessions. In 1996, Channel Four screened a tribute to her entitled Sex and Fame: The Mary Millington Story, featuring an interview with David Sullivan.

Twenty years after her death, the author and film historian Simon Sheridan put Millington's life into context in the biography Come Play with Me: The Life and Films of Mary Millington. Further information about her career can be found in Sheridan's follow-up book Keeping the British End Up: Four Decades of Saucy Cinema, the fourth edition of which was published in April 2011.

In 2004, Millington's prominence was recognised by her inclusion in the Oxford Dictionary of National Biography, edited by Colin Matthew and Brian Harrison. Her entry was written by Richard Davenport-Hines.

In 2008, an exhibition of the work of the late glamour photographer Fred Grierson was held in London, which included several little-seen pictures of Millington taken by Grierson at June Palmer's Strobe Studios in the early 1970s.

In late 2009, an 8 mm copy of one of her early John Lindsay short films Special Assignment resurfaced. Unseen since the early 1970s, it was subsequently transferred to DVD. Two years later in 2011, Wild Lovers, another 8 mm film starring Millington, was also traced and transferred from 8 mm to DVD.

In 2014, four spoken word erotic stories recorded by Millington from 1978 to 1979 were released as a vinyl LP.

A nightclub in Liverpool is named after her. She is commemorated with a blue plaque on the site of the former Moulin Cinema in Great Windmill Street, Soho for her appearance in Come Play with Me. The film is listed in the Guinness Book of World Records as running there continuously for 201 weeks, from April 1977 to March 1981, making it the longest-running British film. The validity of this record and the blue plaque have been called into question by film historian Allen Eyles who says that Come Play with Me ran for 165 weeks and that Britain's longest running film was South Pacific, which ran for four years and twenty-two weeks. Nevertheless, Come Play With Me stands as one of the longest-running films in British movie history.

== Respectable – The Mary Millington Story (2016) ==
A feature-length documentary chronicling Millington's life, Respectable – The Mary Millington Story, was released in 2016. Written, directed and produced by Millington's biographer Simon Sheridan, the film mixes archive footage, previously unseen photographs and interviews with Millington's family, friends and co-stars, including David Sullivan, Pat Astley, Dudley Sutton, Linzi Drew and Maureen Flanagan. The film received its world premiere at London's Regent Street Cinema in April 2016. A DVD was released in the UK on 2 May 2016.

== Selected filmography ==
- Miss Bohrloch (short, 1970)
- Oh, Nurse! (short, 1971)
- Oral Connection (1971)
- Betrayed (short, 1971)
- Special Assignment (1971)
- Secrets of a Door-to-Door Salesman (1973)
- Sex Is My Business (short, 1974)
- Response (1974)
- Love Games (1974)
- Wild Lovers (1974)
- Party Pieces (1975)
- Eskimo Nell (1975)
- Erotic Inferno (1975)
- Private Pleasures (shot in Sweden, 1975)
- Keep It Up Downstairs (1976)
- I'm Not Feeling Myself Tonight (1976)
- Intimate Games (1976)
- Come Play with Me (1977)
- The Playbirds (1978)
- What's Up Superdoc! (1978)
- Confessions from the David Galaxy Affair (1979)
- Queen of the Blues (1979)
- The Great Rock 'n' Roll Swindle (posthumous, 1980)
- Mary Millington's True Blue Confessions (posthumous, 1980)
- Mary Millington's World Striptease Extravaganza (posthumous, 1981)
- Sex and Fame: The Mary Millington Story (TV documentary, 1996)
- Respectable – The Mary Millington Story (cinema documentary, 2016)

== Selected magazine appearances ==
- Frivol No.37 (German magazine) "The Summit of Bliss" (Miss Bohrloch stills) 1970
- Frivol No.40 & 41 (German magazine) Miss Bohrloch stills 1970
- Vi Menn No. 233 (Norwegian magazine) as "Sally Stephens" Britiske Kvinner stillbilder 1970
- Krydder (Norwegian magazine) as "Sally Stephens" 1970
- Vibrations Vol 5 No 12 as "Sally Stevens" & "Jean" in photo-story 'Erotic Charades' 1970
- Men Only Vol 36 No 10 as "Sally Stephens" 1971
- Vibrations Vol 8 No 8 as "Sally Stephens" 1971
- Vibrations Vol 9 No 2 as "Sally Stevens" 1972
- Men Only Vol 37 No 12 as "Rebecca Stephens" 1972
- Vi Menn No. 260 (Norwegian magazine) as "Rebecca Stephens" Britiske Kvinner stillbilder 1972
- Vi Menn No. 266 (Norwegian magazine) as "Rebecca Stephens" Britiske Kvinner stillbilder 1973
- Vi Menn No. 268 (Norwegian magazine) as "Rebecca Stephens" Britiske Kvinner stillbilder 1973
- Men Only Vol 39 No 1 as "Janet Green" 1974
- Late Night Extra 1974 (as "Nancy Astley")
- Around the World in 80 Lays (volumes 1 & 2) photo-novel by Beryl Grant 1974 (cover)
- Knave Vol.6 No.3 1974 (Cover & 8 pages inside - centerfold)
- Fiesta Vol.8 No.6 1974
- Titbits No.4613, 1– 7 August 1974, (Eskimo Nell)
- Fiesta Vol 8 no 5 1974 inside photograph of Mary on the London Underground
- Spick No.261 August 1975 (as "Mary Maxted")
- Whitehouse No.10 1975
- Playbirds Vol.1, No.1 1975
- Playbirds Vol.1, No.2 1975 (cover & 15 pages)
- Playbirds Vol.1, No.3 & 4 1975
- Playbirds Vol.1, No.6 1975
- Playbirds Vol.1, No.8 1975 (Millington at the Frankfurt trade fair)
- Club International Vol.5, No.1, January 1976 (5 pages as "Mia" with Pat Astley)
- Playbirds Vol.1, No.16 1976 (cover & inside)
- Playbirds Vol.1, No 21 1976 (cover only)
- Playbirds Vol.1, No 24 1976 (inside)
- Private No. 51 (Swedish magazine) 1977
- Private No. 52 (Swedish magazine) 1977
- Whitehouse No.40 1978 (colour trade ad for Playbirds film & four-page synopsis)
- Continental Film Review Vol.25, No.6 & 7, 1978 (The Playbirds)
- New Action MS no. 28 1978 (Millington meets Rosemary England photo shoot)
- Playbirds erotic film guide No.1 1978 (Millington cover, Come Play with Me feature)
- Exciting Cinema No.18 circa 1978 ("Mary Millington meets Rosemarie England in the Flesh")
- International Cover Girls No.14 1978
- Whitehouse No.47 1979 (colour trade ad for The David Galaxy Affair plus four-page article on film)
- Revel No. 3 (tribute to Millington, posthumous) 1980

* David Sullivan's magazines were often undated, thus the only way of dating them is by which Sullivan-produced films were being promoted inside the magazines, i.e. a Sullivan magazine which promotes Come Play With Me would be from 1976/1977, one promoting The Playbirds would be circa 1978, and one promoting Confessions from the David Galaxy Affair would be from 1979.

== See also ==
- Decriminalization of sex work
- List of British pornographic actors
- Outline of British pornography
- Pornography in the United Kingdom
- Prostitution in the United Kingdom
- Sex-positive feminism
- Sex-positive movement
- Sex workers' rights
