= What's Up Nurse! =

1977 British film by Derek Ford

- Directed by: Derek Ford
- Screenplay by: Derek Ford
- Produced by: Michael L. Green (producer); Graham Stark (associate producer)
- Starring: John Le Mesurier; Graham Stark; Nicholas Field; Kate Williams; Angela Grant
- Cinematography: Les Young
- Edited by: Richard Marden
- Music by: Roger Webb
- Distributed by: Blackwater Film Productions
- Release date: 1977
- Running time: 77 minutes
- Country: United Kingdom
- Language: English

What's Up Nurse! is a 1977 British sex comedy film directed and written by Derek Ford and starring Nicholas Field, Felicity Devonshire and John Le Mesurier.

It tells the story of the adventures of a young doctor in a hospital. A sequel What's Up Superdoc! was released the following year, with Christopher Mitchell replacing Field as Dr Todd.

== Cast ==
- John Le Mesurier as Dr. Ogden
- Graham Stark as Carthew
- Kate Williams as Matron
- Angela Grant as Helen Arkwright
- Nicholas Field as Dr. Robert 'Sweeney' Todd
- Felicity Devonshire as Olivia Ogden
- Jack Douglas as Police Constable
- Barbara Mitchell as neighbour
- Peter Butterworth as Police Sergeant
- Bill Pertwee as Flash Harry Harrison
- Cardew Robinson as ticket inspector
- Chic Murray as aquarium proprietor
- Andrew Sachs as Guido the waiter
- Anna Karen as Knitter
- Ronnie Brody as jam jar man
- Frank Williams as vicar
- Julia Bond as nurse
- Elisabeth Day as 2nd nurse
- Sheila Bernette as Mrs. Garrard
- Keith Smith as Mr. Newberry
- Kate Harper as club girl
- Terry Duggan as old salt
- Michael Cronin as builder

== Reception ==
Monthly Film Bulletin wrote: "A dishearteningly unfunny sex comedy which discloses a painful package of unfailing bad taste (the most offensive sequence concerning a homosexual who believes he has given birth to a chimpanzee), stupefyingly dull sex scenes, and a collection of double entendres so ancient that they almost constitute some kind of intriguing pre-history of blue comedy."

Léon Hunt describes the film along with Ford's What's Up Superdoc! (1978) as a "return to the Carry On films' favourite setting to explore slap-and-tickle amidst the bedpans."

Sarah Street wrote that Ford's films Commuter Husbands (1972), Keep It Up, Jack (1973), The Sexplorer (1975) and What's Up Nurse (1977) were "films with salacious titles designed to titillate dwindling audiences with their suggestion of breaking taboos."

Michael Hawkes awarded the film 3 out of 5 stars.
