= Secret Rites =

1971 British documentary film by Derek Ford

- Film titles
- Directed by: Derek Ford
- Produced by: Morton M. Lewis
- Starring: Alex Sanders; Penny Beeching; Tony Barton; Jane Spearing; Shirley Harmer
- Narrated by: Lee Peters
- Cinematography: Roy Pointer
- Edited by: Ivor Gleek
- Music by: Bryn Walton
- Production company: Meadway Productions Ltd
- Release date: 18 October 1971; (USA)
- Running time: 47 min.
- Country: United Kingdom
- Language: English

Secret Rites is a 1971 British pseudo-documentary film directed by Derek Ford. It concerns the study of witchcraft and black magic, featuring occultist Alex Sanders. Ford wrote the narration. The film's music was composed by Bryn Walton and played by The Spindle.

This film should not be confused with the 1970 Italian film Riti segreti directed by Gabriella Cangini.

== Synopsis ==
After a "shocker" opening, the film details, documentary-style, a series of satanic rituals involving young initiate Penny, performed by Wiccan High Priest Alex Sanders and his coven.

== Cast ==
- "King or the Witches" Alex Sanders
- Penny Beeching
- Tony Barton
- Jane Spearing
- Shirley Harmer
- Jane Spearing
- Wendy Tomlinson
- Lee Peters (narrator)

== Critical reception ==
Monthly Film Bulletin said: "An unusually sympathetic and selective addition to the recent spate of witchcraft documentaries. After a spoof opening sequence to illustrate some popular misconceptions, with a screaming girl victim rescued from "unmentionable obscenities" by a crucifix-wielding hero, the film concentrates almost entirely on ritual as performed by Alex Sanders' now famous coven. An initiation ceremony for an aspiring witch is followed by a re-enactment of the 'mythical rite' on which it is founded; a marriage ceremony (binding for a year and a day) is followed by a 'union of souls' ritual which has its basis in the Egyptian Book of the Dead. Though some of the other rituals illustrated inevitably contain an erotic element, there is no black magic, no wax images and pins. Instead, the film presents witchcraft as another religion, allegedly the oldest, stressing its spiritual significance to those who embrace it."

The British Film Institute wrote: "Part Mondo movie, part countercultural artefact, this strange mid-length 'documentary' by sex film director Derek Ford lifts the lid on witchcraft in 1970s Notting Hill. Mystery band The Spindle provide the groovy, psychedelic sounds while tentative occult enthusiast Penny and a serious-sounding narrator introduce the viewer to three ritual acts. Far out. ... Alex Sanders' title King of the Witches came in part from his 1967 biography, which Penny refers to. Her interest in Wicca appears questionable, though – she featured in the Frankie Howerd TV comedy Up Pompeii! and worked as a model. The film's authenticity is thrown into further doubt by sex film historian Simon Sheridan's observation that some coven members also appeared in contemporary underground hardcore porn."

The Journal of Film Preservation wrote: "The emphasis, predictably, is on bare flesh, brazenly displayed in a variety of solemnly enacted rituals and ceremonies. The audience identification figure here is Penny, a pretty young hairdresser's receptionist who's long been drawn to the occult and is eager to find out more. She takes the Underground to a distinctly ungentrified Notting Hill Gate to speak to Alex Sanders, who attempts to weed out time-wasters with warnings of the regular discussion groups and lengthy periods of private study required, rather than 'any other things' she may have been anticipating. Nevertheless, nude rituals swiftly ensue."

David McGillivray wrote that the film is: "ostensibly a documentary about the bizarre activities of Alex Sanders, self-styled King of the Witches, although everything reeks of phoniness. A pretty young initiate looks as though she has been borrowed from the nudie next door. The end titles credit the studio used."

David V. Barrett wrote in Fortean Times: "Secret Rites is great fun. It starts with a deliberately clichéd Hammer Horror-style black magic ritual, before cutting to Sanders saying that this is not the reality of today's witchcraft. This film is also Sanders from beginning to end, including the OTT ritual it begins with. ... But the film is not as it appears: it was shot, not in Sanders's home/ temple but in a well-lit studio; and although some of the coven may have been genuine members, some, including the 'initiate', actress Penny Beeching (Up Pompeii!, Morecambe & Wise) were straight actors, and others were porn actors. When Secret Rites was first released, it was paired with the soft-porn film Suburban Wives from the same director."

Starburst magazine wrote: "Secret Rites is delightful, and very, very English. We are introduced to Penny, a hairdresser’s receptionist, who wants to be initiated into the Notting Hill coven that Sanders runs, for reasons best known to herself. The film, which never outstays its welcome at 47 minutes, follows Penny as she and a fellow initiate are brought into the mystic circle, and given the once over by high priest Sanders. We also get to witness a Wiccan wedding, and the beginnings of a sacred sex rite, and it’s all very titillating, which belies the usual fare of director Derek Ford, best known for The Wife Swappers, Sex Express, and Keep It Up, Jack."

== Home media ==
In 2019 the film was released by Renown Films on a double-feature DVD/Blu-Ray, paired with Legend of the Witches (dir. Malcolm Leigh, 1970).
