= BBC New Year's Eve specials =

Special New Year's Eve programmes by the BBC

- New Year Live title card from 2012–13
- Also known as: New Year Live; New Year's Eve Fireworks; The Big New Year's In
- Genre: New Year television special
- Presented by: Various (see below)
- Opening theme: 21st Century Renaissance by Dave Hewson and Bill Baylis
- Country of origin: United Kingdom
- Original language: English

Production
- Camera setup: Multi-camera
- Running time: 90 minutes (2005–2008); 30 minutes (2009–2012); 85 minutes (Note: Since 2013 the programme consists of a musical performance, then a segment of approximately 15 minutes showing the fireworks, then a second musical performance.) (2013–)
- Production company: BBC Studios Events

Original release
- Network: BBC One; BBC News (UK feed); BBC News (international feed)
- Release: 31 December 2004 – present

Related
- BBC Scotland's Hogmanay

BBC One's New Year's Eve specials have aired in varying formats; in 2000, and since 2004, they have prominently featured live coverage of London's New Year's Eve festivities, including the midnight bongs of Big Ben, and the fireworks show on the River Thames and London Eye.

From the 1950s through the 1980s, the BBC's New Year's Eve programmes largely originated from Scotland, and were themed around the country's Hogmanay festivities. The practice largely ended after 1985, following the poor critical reception to that year's special. A Scotland-based special briefly returned for 1998–99, but was also poorly received.

For 2000, the BBC led the global 2000 Today consortium, which televised coverage of New Year's events from around the world, and served as the host broadcaster for coverage of festivities from the United Kingdom. In 2004, the BBC began to broadcast New Year Live, which primarily featured live reports from the South Bank to cover the countdown to midnight. From 2006 to 2009, the special also featured music performances.

Beginning in 2014, BBC One began to air concert specials as part of its New Year's Eve programming, each of which featuring a headlining musician. The specials are divided into two parts, with an intermission approaching midnight for the live broadcast of the London fireworks.

Other BBC channels also air New Year's Eve specials; since 1993, BBC Two has aired Jools' Annual Hootenanny—a concert special spun off from Later... with Jools Holland. BBC One Scotland opts out of the London-centric specials to carry its own lineup of Hogmanay-themed programmes, including comedy specials and Hogmanay—a special focusing on New Year festivities in Edinburgh.

== Format ==
=== Early specials ===
The earliest recorded commemorations of the New Year by the original British Broadcasting Company began in 1923–24, and often featured performances by dance bands; a special was broadcast from the Savoy Hotel in London, featuring performances by the Savoy Orpheans and Savoy Havana Bands, and a religious talk by Archibald Fleming. The BBC also began its practice of broadcasting the chimes of Big Ben. 2BD in Scotland opted out to broadcast its own programming. The following year's broadcast also included a speech by the BBC's first director of education J. C. Stobart, and a broadcast from Royal Albert Hall after midnight until closedown. The 1925–26 broadcast featured the chimes of St Botolph-without-Bishopsgate, and music by Jack Hylton's band from Royal Albert Hall. It also marked the formal dissolution of the British Broadcasting Company and its transition to the public-service British Broadcasting Corporation.

1929–30 featured The Birth of the Year, which featured coverage relayed from New Year's festivities in other countries in Europe, and the United States. The BBC Television Service began regular broadcasts in 1936, but closed down at 10:15 p.m.; the channel broadcast retrospective clip shows on 31 December 1936 and 1937, before extending its broadcast day to 12:05 a.m. for 1938 to broadcast a special presented by Leslie Mitchell from Grosvenor House Hotel. BBC Television was suspended due to World War II in September 1939, while the BBC Home Service carried a watchnight service prior to closedown at 12:05 a.m.

After television service resumed in 1946, BBC TV New Year's specials continued to vary, ranging from footage of a dinner party at the Grosvenor Hotel with the Dagenham Girl Pipers (1947) prior to closedown at 12:05 a.m., to London watchnight services, and in 1949, scenes of sleeping babies at St Thomas's Hospital. In 1952, the BBC broadcast a special presented by Richard Dimbleby from St Thomas's Hospital, with appearances by Donald Peers and Janet Brown.

=== Hogmanay specials ===
In 1953, the BBC began to network Hogmanay-themed specials from BBC Scotland as its New Year's Eve programme, beginning with that year's Hogmanay Party presented by comedian Jimmy Logan and singer Kenneth McKellar from Glasgow, and later The White Heather Club. The duo quickly became synonymous with New Year's Eve programmes on the BBC, with Andy Stewart and Moira Anderson also becoming noted fixtures. The specials (as well as competitors established by ITV) were divisive among critics, who felt that they perpetuated a stereotypical portrayal of Scottish culture, and questioned the relevancy of making a distinctly Scottish celebration the forefront of networked New Year's Eve programming. Comedy historian Graham McCann noted that most of these Hogmanay-centric specials were likely intended to help the BBC meet quotas for networked programming produced outside of London.

By the 1980s, the specials were being presented from increasingly downmarket venues (such as local hotels), and often featured drunk, rowdy audiences, and comedy acts whose material relied on regional in-jokes and jokes at the expense of the other Home Nations. The Hogmanay format was retooled for the 1985 special—the Tom O'Connor-presented Live into 85—which was broadcast from the Gleneagles Hotel, and attempted to feature guests and performers with a broader appeal to English viewers. However, the special was met with multiple setbacks; budgetary issues only allowed them to book two English performers—pop band Bucks Fizz and Name That Tune singer Maggie Moone—with the remainder of the lineup largely consisting of Scottish talent. Bucks Fizz were then replaced by Modern Romance when the band's members were injured in a tour bus crash in mid-December. An audience of rowdy revellers proved to be disruptive to the production, with reports of one audience member who sexually harassed Moone, and the special featured guest appearances by a visibly drunk John Grieve and a stricken Chic Murray.

The special was widely panned by critics and viewers, resulting in the BBC replacing the Hogmanay specials (subsequently relegated to regional opt-outs on BBC 1 Scotland) with other formats, including a New Year's Eve episode of EastEnders, specials featuring BBC Radio personalities such as Terry Wogan, and comedic year-in-review specials presented by Clive James, and later Angus Deayton.

A BBC Scotland-produced New Year's special would briefly return for 1998–99, with its current Hogmanay Live format being retooled for national broadcast as New Year Live. The special was co-presented from Edinburgh by Carol Smillie of Changing Rooms and comedian Fred MacAulay, and featured a performance by Duran Duran. The broadcast was largely panned by critics, who commented upon MacAulay and Smillie's hosting (including MacAulay making several off-colour jokes about Smillie's Rear of the Year award), its performances and comedy sketches, and considering the special to have been a diluted, anglicised take on Hogmanay.

=== 2000: 2000 Today ===
For 1999–2000, the BBC broadcast 2000 Today, a telecast covering global New Year's Eve festivities marking the arrival of the year 2000. The telecast was produced as part of a global consortium led by the BBC and WGBH, and was designated as one of five projects undertaken by the broadcaster to mark the arrival of the 21st century. The special would feature coverage of the opening of the Millennium Dome, and London's New Year's fireworks show on the South Bank. The special was slated to feature guest appearances by Kofi Annan, Stephen Hawking, Barry Humphries (as Dame Edna, covering the Times Square ball drop in New York City), Kiri Te Kanawa, Sophia Loren, Nelson Mandela, Cliff Richard, and Tina Turner among others, as well as the special National Lottery "Big Draw 2000" drawings.

Alongside the television broadcast, BBC Radio 1 aired One World, an international electronic music event featuring DJ sets by Carl Cox (who would open the event from Australia during a special Radio 1 Breakfast, and then be the final performer in Honolulu, Hawaii), Dance Anthems host Dave Pearce (who would perform from Glasgow for the countdown to midnight in the UK), Pete Tong, Paul Oakenfold, and Fatboy Slim among others. Emma B and Scott Mills hosted the main programme of the event, Millennium Dance Party, which ran through the evening of 31 December to the following morning. BBC Two provided a retrospective-themed "Nineties Night".

The BBC returned to invariant specials for a period afterward, such as Jonathan Ross's It's Your New Year's Eve Party, and a networked broadcast of BBC Scotland's Hogmanay Live for 2003.

=== 2004–2013: New Year Live ===
For 2004, London revived its New Year's Eve fireworks as an annual event. BBC One returned to a live London-based special for 2004, known as New Year Live, to cover its revived fireworks event.

The programme initially covered the New Year's Eve fireworks in London in 2004. In 2005, the format changed to include commentary from celebrity guests. The format changed further in 2006, to include live performances from music artists and the programme was extended to air for between 60 and 90 minutes. This format remained until 2009.

From 2009 until 2013, the programme returned to its original format of one presenter interviewing the general public on the streets of London, leading into the New Year Fireworks.

=== 2014–present: Concert specials and New Year's Eve Fireworks ===
Beginning in 2013, BBC One began to air concert specials from Central Hall, Westminster on New Year's Eve; the specials are divided into two parts, with a segment featuring live coverage of midnight celebrations from London (billed in programme guides as New Year's Eve Fireworks) airing in between. The first special, Gary Barlow's Big Ben Bash, was headlined by Gary Barlow. During the 2014 event, drones were used to film the display. For the 2016 and 2017 events, the fireworks display was also streamed in 360-degree video.

Due to the COVID-19 pandemic in the United Kingdom, the London fireworks were held as a broadcast-only event for 2021 and 2022. For 2020–21, BBC One's New Year's Eve programming was promoted under the blanket title The Big New Year's In. It included a titular special hosted by Paddy McGuinness and Maya Jama live from Dock10 studios in Salford, a special episode of The Graham Norton Show, an Alicia Keys concert special from Los Angeles, and a live, broadcast-only fireworks presentation from London with no public viewings.

The previous concert format returned for 2021–22, with Olly Alexander hosting The Big New Years & Years Party; at this point the special began to be filmed at Riverside Studios in Hammersmith. London's New Year's Eve fireworks were once again conducted as a "live broadcast spectacular" with no public viewings (which included an appearance by Giles Terera, and a performance by the West End Musical Choir at Shakespeare's Globe); the city cancelled a planned in-person celebration at Trafalgar Square due to Omicron variant concerns.

Singer-songwriter and Eurovision Song Contest 2022 runner-up Sam Ryder hosted the 2022–23 special, Sam Ryder's All Star New Year's Eve. The 2023–24 special was hosted by Rick Astley from the Roundhouse in Chalk Farm, the 2024–25 special was hosted by Sophie Ellis-Bextor, while Ronan Keating hosted the 2025–26 special.

== Ratings ==
The first show in 2004/05 attracted 6.35 million viewers, growing to 6.43 million for 2005/06. Ratings dropped to 6 million for 2007's arrival, but peaked with 9.6 million viewers at midnight. The 2007/08 show dropped to a new low of 5.35 million viewers, then 5.83 million in 2009. The show changed to a 11.45–12.15 slot for 2010's arrival, with 7.65 million watching, peaking at more than 10 million. The 2011 show grew to 9.3 million viewers watching, peaking at more than 11 million at midnight. 2012 was the most-watched edition so far, at 10.6 million, peaking at more than 12 million viewers. The 2013 show got 9.7 million, with 13.3 million at midnight.

As the show changed again to a concert, the fireworks achieved success with 13.52 million, peaking at 14.1 million. Gary Barlow's concert afterwards was boosted to 10 million viewers, dipping to 8.8 million. For 2015 the fireworks had 12.5 million viewers, and Queen + Adam Lambert's concert 10 million, dipping to 9.4 million. Viewers dropped in 2016 to 11.4 million, but Bryan Adams' concert pulled in strong ratings, getting over 6 million. 2017's arrival saw a drop to 10.8 million, while 2018 had 10.4 million. However, for the first time since 2015's arrival, the 2019 show got more than 11 million, at 12.3 million.

== Broadcasts ==
The programme is broadcast on BBC One in England, Wales and Northern Ireland whilst BBC Scotland's Hogmanay airs on BBC One Scotland with celebrations based in Edinburgh. Both are available to watch anywhere in the United Kingdom on digital television and online on BBC iPlayer.

=== Presenters and guests ===
No.	Year	Presenter(s)	Guest(s)	Ratings (millions)
New Year Live
1	2004–05	Natasha Kaplinsky	Unknown	6.35
2	2005–06	Natasha Kaplinsky	Clare Balding, Andrew Marr and Doug Segal	6.43
3	2006–07	Natasha Kaplinsky and Nick Knowles	Jamelia, Connie Fisher, The Feeling and Sophie Ellis-Bextor	6.06
4	2007–08	Nick Knowles and Myleene Klass	Gethin Jones, Katie Melua and Richard Fleeshman	5.35
5	2008–09	Nick Knowles and Kate Silverton	Gethin Jones, Matt Baker, Alesha Dixon, Russell Watson, Craig Revel Horwood, Jodie Prenger and Rita Simons	5.83
6	2009–10	Myleene Klass	—N/a	7.65
7	2010–11	Jake Humphrey	—N/a	9.37
8	2011–12	Jake Humphrey	—N/a	10.62
9	2012–13	Gabby Logan	—N/a	9.73
New Year's Eve Fireworks
10	2013–14	Susanna Reid	Gary Barlow's Big Ben Bash (Gary Barlow)	13.52
11	2014–15	Greg James and Gemma Cairney	Queen + Adam Lambert Rock Big Ben Live (Queen + Adam Lambert)	12.50
12	2015–16	Ore Oduba	Bryan Adams Rocks Big Ben Live (Bryan Adams featuring Jon Anderson)	11.48
13	2016–17	Melvin Odoom	Robbie Rocks Big Ben Live (Robbie Williams)	10.83
14	2017–18	Roman Kemp	Good Times (Chic with Nile Rodgers)	10.40
15	2018–19	Stacey Dooley and Joe Sugg	Madness Rocks Big Ben Live (Madness and The Kingdom Choir)	12.39
16	2019–20	Roman Kemp	Craig David Rocks Big Ben Live (Craig David)	10.84
17	2020–21	Paddy McGuinness and Maya Jama	The Big New Year's In (Owain Wyn Evans, Jordan North, Shirley Ballas, Chris Kamara, Frock Destroyers) and Alicia Keys Rocks New Year's Eve (Alicia Keys)	10.75
18	2021–22	Olly Alexander	The Big New Years & Years Party (Years & Years, Kylie Minogue, Pet Shop Boys)	10.10
19	2022–23	Sam Ryder	Sam Ryder's All Star New Year's Eve (Sam Ryder, Melanie C, Sigrid, Justin Hawkins, House Gospel Choir)	11.22
20	2023–24	Rick Astley	Rick Astley Rocks New Year’s Eve (Rick Astley, Sharleen Spiteri, Rylan, House Gospel Choir)	11.41
21	2024–25	Sophie Ellis-Bextor	Sophie Ellis-Bextor’s New Year’s Eve Disco (Sophie Ellis-Bextor, Jessie Ware, Jake Shears, Emily Roberts, MDL Singers)	10.40
22	2025–26	Ronan Keating	Ronan Keating & Friends: A New Year’s Eve Party (Ronan Keating, Keith Duffy and Shane Lynch, Louise, Shona McGarty, Calum Scott)	10.04
23	2026–27	Rylan Clark and Michelle Visage	The Big NYE Party With Steps & Blue (Steps and Blue)	TBA

== Notes and references ==
=== References ===
ABBA New Year eve party
