= Gabrielle Drake =

British actress (born 1944)

- Born: Gabrielle Mary Drake; 30 March 1944 (age 82); Lahore, Punjab, British India
- Education: Royal Academy of Dramatic Art
- Occupations: Film, television and stage actress
- Years active: 1964-present
- Television: UFO; The Brothers
- Spouse: Louis de Wet (m. 1977; died 2018)
- Relatives: Molly Drake (mother); Nick Drake (brother)

Gabrielle Drake (born 30 March 1944) is a British actress. She appeared in the 1970s in television series The Brothers and UFO. In the early 1970s she appeared in several erotic roles on screen. She later took parts in soap operas Crossroads and Coronation Street. She has also had a stage career.

Her brother was the musician Nick Drake, whose work she has consistently helped to promote since his death in 1974.

== Early life and education ==
Drake was born in Lahore, British India, the daughter of Rodney Shuttleworth Drake (1908–1988) and amateur songwriter Molly Drake. She is the sister of songwriter and composer Nick Drake. Her father was an engineer working for the Bombay Burmah Trading Corporation. The family moved from Burma to Britain when she was eight.

She later commented that,

Until then, life was fairly easy out east. There were lots of servants ... not that I remember having a spoilt childhood. Then suddenly we were back in England and in the grips of rationing. And yet, we were lucky in a way. We came back with my nanny who knew far more about England than mummy did. I remember the two of them standing over the Aga with a recipe book trying to work out how to roast beef, that sort of thing!

On the ship travelling to Britain she appeared in children's theatrical productions, later saying of herself "I was a dreadful exhibitionist." She attended Edgbaston College for Girls in Birmingham, Wycombe Abbey School, Buckinghamshire and the Royal Academy of Dramatic Art (RADA) in London. She has had a long stage career beginning in the mid-1960s, and has regularly appeared in television dramas.

== Screen career ==
Drake first gained wide attention for her portrayal of Lieutenant Gay Ellis in the 1970 science fiction television series UFO, in which her costume consisted of a silver suit and a purple wig. In the series, her character is the commander of the SHADO Moonbase, which is Earth's first line of defence against invading flying saucers. Drake appeared in roughly half the 26 episodes produced, leaving the series during a break in the production to pursue other acting opportunities.

In 1971, Drake appeared in a short film entitled Crash!, based on a chapter in J. G. Ballard's book The Atrocity Exhibition. The film, directed by Harley Cokeliss, featured Ballard talking about the ideas in his book. Drake appeared as a passenger and car-crash victim. Ballard later developed the idea into his 1973 novel Crash. In his draft of the novel he mentioned Drake by name, but references to her were removed from the published version. In the 2009 BBC documentary Synth Britannia clips of Ballard and Drake from Crash! were inserted into the 1979 video for Gary Numan's song "Cars". A reviewer in The Scotsman commented that the presence of Drake "brought serious glamour to urban alienation".

Her early television appearances include The Avengers (1967), Coronation Street (as Inga Olsen in 1967) and The Saint (1968). On 26 December 1968 she played opposite American actor Robert Lansing in a BBC television series called Journey to the Unknown in an episode called "The Beckoning Fair One", and an episode called "Sorry Is Just a Word" of Special Branch. In 1970, she auditioned for the part of Jo Grant in Doctor Who, reaching the final shortlist of three alongside Katy Manning and Cheryl Hall, with Manning winning the part.

In the early 1970s, Drake was associated with the boom in British sexploitation movies, repeatedly appearing nude or topless. She played a nude artist's model in the 1970 film Connecting Rooms, and was one of Peter Sellers' conquests in the film There's a Girl in My Soup. She also played one of the lead roles in the sex comedy Au Pair Girls (1972) and appeared in two Derek Ford films, Suburban Wives (1971) and its sequel Commuter Husbands (1972), in which she played the narrator who links the disparate episodes together.

She gained wide exposure in The Brothers, the hit BBC family drama series, in which she appeared as a regular for the first four seasons playing Jill, the girlfriend (and later wife) of David Hammond. She also appeared in the 1976 episode "Kill Two Birds" of Brian Clemens' series Thriller, in Kelly Monteith (as Monteith's wife, 1979–80), a television version of The Importance of Being Earnest (1985, for LWT/PBS), Crossroads (1985–87, as motel boss Nicola Freeman) and returned to Coronation Street in 2009 as Vanessa. In The Inspector Lynley Mysteries (2003–05) she played the protagonist's mother.

She was the subject of This Is Your Life on 8 April 1987.

== Stage career ==
Drake made her stage debut in 1964, during the inaugural season of the Everyman Theatre, Liverpool, playing Cecily in The Importance of Being Earnest. In 1966, she joined the Birmingham Repertory Company and played Queen Isabella in Marlowe's Edward II. She also had roles in Private Lives (with Renee Asherson), The Simpleton of the Unexpected Isles (with Linda Marlowe and Patrick Mower), Twelfth Night and Inadmissible Evidence. The following year, she was Roxanne in Cyrano de Bergerac at the Open Air Theatre, Regent's Park. In the 1974–5, season at the Bristol Old Vic, she played in Cowardy Custard, a devised entertainment featuring the words and music of Noël Coward. In 1975, she appeared as Madeline Bassett in the original London cast of the Andrew Lloyd Webber and Alan Ayckbourn musical By Jeeves. She also appeared in French Without Tears at the Little Theatre, Bristol. In 1978, she played Lavinia, opposite Simon Callow in the title role, in Shakespeare's Titus Andronicus, directed by Adrian Noble, at the New Vic, Bristol. She also appeared at the Bristol Old Vic in that year, in Vanbrugh's The Provok'd Wife.

She was directed by Mike Ockrent in Look, No Hans!, alongside David Jason, during the 83–84 season at the Theatre Royal, Bath. She made a second appearance in The Importance of Being Earnest at the Royalty Theatre, London, in a production directed by Donald Sinden, which also starred Wendy Hiller, Clive Francis, Phyllida Law and Denis Lawson (87-88). In 1988, she played Fiona Foster in a revival of Ayckbourn's How the Other Half Loves, first at the Greenwich Theatre, then at the Duke of York's Theatre. During the 1990–91 season at the Theatre Royal, Bath, she played in Risky Kisses with Ian Lavender. She was in the Mobil Touring Theatre's official centenary production of Charley's Aunt in 1991, with Frank Windsor, Patrick Cargill and Mark Curry. In 1993, she was Monica in Coward's Present Laughter at the Globe Theatre, London, in a revival directed by and starring Tom Conti. She co-starred with Jeremy Clyde in the 1995 King's Head Theatre tour of Cavalcade, directed by Dan Crawford. In 1999, she was Vittoria in Paul Kerryson's production of The White Devil at the Haymarket Theatre, Leicester. She also toured with the Oxford Stage Company in that year, as Hester Bellboys in John Whiting's A Penny for a Song, alongside Julian Glover, Jeremy Clyde, and Charles Kay. She played Mrs Malaprop in the 2002 touring production of The Rivals with the British Actors' Theatre Company, whose artistic director, Kate O'Mara, was Drake's co-star in the TV series The Brothers.

She has made regular appearances at the Royal Exchange Theatre, Manchester, since her debut there in a non-pantomime version of Cinderella, written by Trevor Peacock, in 1979. That same year, she co-starred with Sorcha Cusack and Susan Penhaligon in Caspar Wrede's production of The Cherry Orchard. In 1986, she was Madame Gobette in the British premiere of Maurice Hennequin's Court in the Act, which subsequently played at the Yvonne Arnaud Theatre, Guildford, and the Theatre Royal, Bath, before transferring to the Phoenix Theatre in London (1987). Other roles at the Royal Exchange include Mrs Erlynne in Lady Windermere's Fan (1996); Anna in The Ghost Train Tattoo (2000); Fay in Loot (2001); Lady Bracknell in The Importance of Being Earnest (2004); and The Comtesse de la Briere in What Every Woman Knows (2006). At the same theatre in 2001, Drake replaced Patricia Routledge as Mrs Conway during the rehearsal period for J. B. Priestley's Time and the Conways, when Routledge was forced to withdraw from the production due to illness.

Elsewhere, she has appeared in her one-woman show, Dear Scheherazade, as the 19th century writer Elizabeth Gaskell (2005, 2007, 2010). At the Chipping Campden Literature Festival in 2011, she and Martin Jarvis read extracts from the letters and diaries of Robert and Clara Schumann in the recital, Beloved Clara. She had appeared in the same piece the previous year, again with Jarvis and the pianist Lucy Parham, at the Wigmore Hall in London.

== Personal life ==
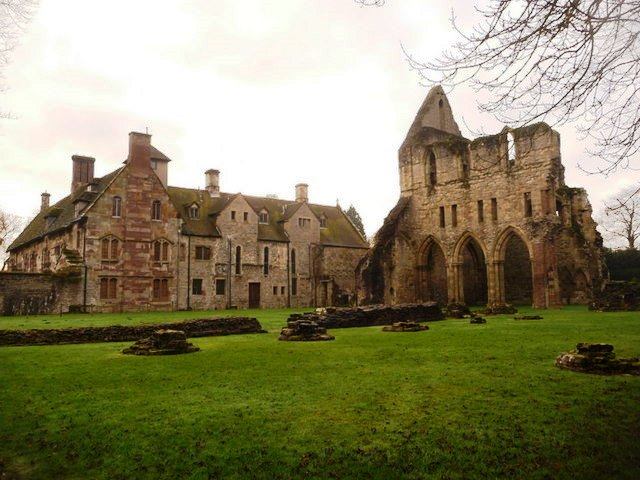
Drake's home Wenlock Abbey (left), attached to the ruins of the medieval priory

Gabrielle has helped to ensure the public renown of her brother Nick Drake and her mother Molly Drake. She can be heard accompanying Nick on a number of songs that he recorded privately, and which have since been released on the album Family Tree. After the release of songs written and performed by her mother, she said "Her creativity was a personal thing, and she was lucky to be able to develop it in an environment where that side of her was totally accepted. Indeed, my father encouraged it. He was so proud of her. On one occasion, he even made the 20-mile drive to Birmingham to get four songs pressed onto a disc." In 2014, she co-wrote and edited, with Cally Callomon, Nick Drake: Remembered for a While, a memoir of her brother. In April 2018, she collected the Hall of Fame Folk Award 2018 on her brother's behalf in Belfast.

She lives in Wenlock Abbey in Much Wenlock, Shropshire, in a house she bought in 1983 with her husband, South African-born artist Louis de Wet, who died in 2018. They renovated their home over several years as an artistic project and, in 2004, he described it as "the most beautiful building site in the world". Drake was the co-producer of In the Gaze of the Medusa, a 2013 film about the renovation project and her husband's designs for the house.

== Filmography ==
Year	Title	Role	Notes
1967	The Man Outside	BEA Girl	
1969	Crossplot	Celia	
1970	Connecting Rooms	Jean	
1970	There's a Girl in My Soup	Julia Halforde-Smythe	
1972	Suburban Wives	Secretary	
1972	Commuter Husbands	The Storyteller/The Wife	
1972	Au Pair Girls	Randi Lindstrom	
1980	All About a Prima Ballerina	Barbara	
1995	The Steal	Anthea	

== Television roles ==
Year	Title	Role	Notes
1967	The Avengers	Angora	Episode: "The Hidden Tiger"
1968	The Saint	Diana Flemming	Episode: "The Best Laid Schemes"
1968	Journey to the Unknown	Kit Beaumont	Episode: "The Beckoning Fair One"
1969	The Champions	Sarah	Episode: "Full Circle"
1970-71	UFO	Lt. Gay Ellis	10 episodes
1970	Special Branch	Karolina Novakova	Episode: "Sorry Is Just a Word"
1970	Man at the Top	Fiona Ingle	Episode: "Join the Human Race"
1972-74	The Brothers	Jill	Seasons 1-4
1975	Thriller	Tracy	Episode: "Kill Two Birds"
1977	The New Avengers	Penny Redfern	Episode: "Dead Men Are Dangerous"
1978	The Professionals	Julia	Episode: "Close Quarters"
1979-83	The Kelly Monteith Show		13 episodes
1981	Never the Twain	Harriet Arbuthnot	Episode: "The Iron Duke"
1984	Number 10	Caroline Montague	2 episodes
1985-86	Crossroads	Nicola Freeman	4 episodes
2003-05	The Inspector Lynley Mysteries	Lady Asherton	2 episodes
2011-12	Doctors	Bella Smith/Julia Templeman	2 episodes

== Audio recordings ==
- The Songs and Poems of Molly Drake (2017)

== Bibliography ==
- Boyd, Joe (2006). White Bicycles – Making Music in the 1960s. Serpent's Tail. ISBN 1-85242-910-0.
- Dann, Trevor (2006). Darker Than The Deepest Sea: The Search For Nick Drake. London: Da Capo Press. ISBN 0-306-81520-6.
