= Ronnie Brody =

English actor (1918–1991)

- in Dave Allen at Large (1971)
- Born: 6 November 1918; Bristol, England
- Died: 8 May 1991 (aged 72); Broadstairs, England

Ronnie Brody (6 November 1918 – 8 May 1991) was a British actor who appeared in many comedy television series and films.

His film appearances included: A Funny Thing Happened on the Way to the Forum, Carry On Loving, Don't Lose Your Head, Finders Keepers, Superman 3 and The Beatles film Help!.

His television appearances included: The Benny Hill Show, Hancock's Half Hour, Rising Damp, Dad's Army, The Sweeney (Episode 3, Series 3, "Visiting Fireman" – Garage Mechanic), Dave Allen at Large and The Goodies (episode "Punky Business"), Are You Being Served?, Hi-de-Hi!, Bless This House (Episode 3, Series 3, "Entente Not So Cordiale?" – Henri); episode four of The Howerd Confessions, and Carry On Laughing,

== Filmography ==
Year	Title	Role	Notes
1956	Who Done It?	Shop Assistant	Uncredited
1963	A Stitch in Time	Small Band Member	Uncredited
1964	The Bargee	Ted Croxley	Uncredited
1965	Help!	Priest / Thug	Uncredited
1966	A Funny Thing Happened on the Way to the Forum	Roman soldier	
1966	Finders Keepers	Drunk	
1966	Don't Lose Your Head	Little Man	Uncredited
1967	The Plank	Nude Model Carrier	
1968	The Bliss of Mrs. Blossom	Security Guard	
1969	Crooks and Coronets	Gambler	Uncredited
1969	The Bed Sitting Room	Dwarf / Chauffeur	
1970	Carry On Loving	Henry	
1971	Percy	Reporter	
1971	Fun and Games	Inmate #1	
1971	The Magnificent Seven Deadly Sins	Costermonger	(segment "Sloth")
1973	Bless This House	Henri	
1976	I'm Not Feeling Myself Tonight	Neighbour	
1976	The Ritz	Small Patron	
1978	What's Up Superdoc!	The Boss	
1978	What's Up Nurse!	Jam Jar Man	
1978	A Hitch in Time	Grandpa Hatton-Jones	
1980	Rising Damp	Italian Waiter	
1983	Superman III	Husband	
1987	Little Dorrit	Broke Tenant	
1990	The Fool		(final film role)
