= New Year's Eve in London =

Firework display in London, England

London's New Year's Eve Fireworks
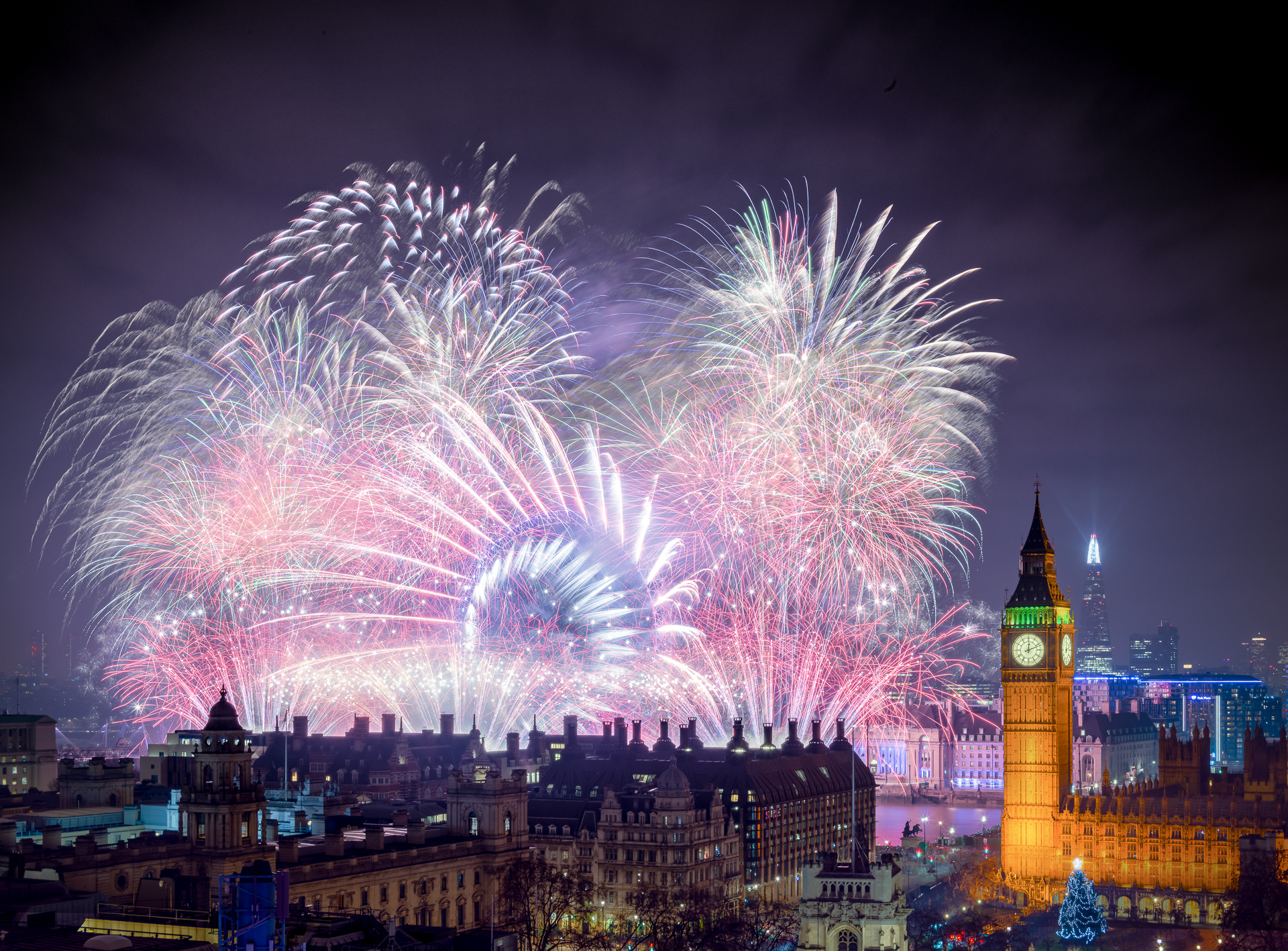
- 2015 display
- Genre: New Year's Eve event
- Date: 31 December/1 January
- Begins: 8:00 PM (GMT)
- Ends: 12:45 AM (GMT)
- Frequency: Annually
- Locations: Victoria Embankment, South Bank, River Thames and the London Eye
- Years active: 2000–present
- Inaugurated: 2000
- Founder: Mayor of London
- Most recent: 2025–26 (2026)
- Previous event: 2024–25 (2025)
- Next event: 2026–27 (2027)
- Attendance: >100,000 (2023–24)
- Budget: £4.5 million (2022–23)
- Website: https://www.london.gov.uk/nye

The New Year's Eve festivities in London, England, have regularly consisted of a midnight fireworks show. The focal point of the festivities are the South Bank, where the chimes of Big Ben at midnight signify the arrival of the new year, and pyrotechnics are launched from barges along the River Thames and from the London Eye observation wheel.

New Year's Eve celebrations were first held in an organised fashion in 1999 to celebrate the arrival of the year 2000, and produced by Ten Alps on behalf of the Greater London Authority. Due to disputes with the city, the New Year's fireworks shows were not held again regularly until New Year's Eve 2004, where Jack Morton Worldwide began to organise the show on behalf of the Greater London Authority.

Public New Year's Eve festivities in London were suspended in 2021 and 2022 due to the COVID-19 pandemic, being replaced by broadcast-only events due to restrictions or uncertainties surrounding public gatherings. These presentations for New Year's Eve included a fireworks and drone show, held at different London landmarks rather than the South Bank. The event returned to the South Bank for 2023, with events firm Identity assuming production duties on behalf of the Greater London Authority.

== History ==
=== 2000–05 ===
A 20-minute New Year's fireworks display was organised by the Greater London Authority for the first time to celebrate the year 2000. It was produced by Bob Geldof's Ten Alps, and estimated to have been seen in-person by three million people. It was announced that the show would feature an effect at midnight consisting of 200 feet (61 m)-tall flames in an "advancing river of fire going upstream at 650 mph" down the Thames (representing the speed of the Earth's rotation), although the "river of fire" effect was panned by critics and spectators who believed that the result did not resemble what was suggested by the organisers. Geldof believed that the event was successful, and hoped that it would become an annual tradition. In the aftermath of the events, there were reports of overcrowding on the London Underground, and the Metropolitan Police had to pay £3 million in overtime.

The GLA planned to host a second event for New Year's Eve 2001, which would also be organised by Ten Alps, and co-produced by Syd Howard—the Australian producer of Sydney New Year's Eve and fireworks during the 2000 Summer Olympics. Unlike 2000, the main fireworks display would have instead taken place earlier in the evening at 7 p.m., with a smaller display at midnight. However, in November 2000, it was announced that the event had been cancelled due to safety concerns raised by the Underground and London police. Approximately 80,000 revellers gathered around Trafalgar Square to celebrate the New Year, as had been a tradition for many years.

A fireworks show returned for 2003–04, with Jack Morton Worldwide becoming producer. Ahead of the 2004–05 event, London Assembly member Bob Neill argued that London's New Year's Eve festivities were not as good as those of Paris or New York City—two of its competitors in bids for the 2012 Summer Olympics—stating that "If we are to be a serious contender for the Olympics we want to be able to show that London can put on a decent show." Out of respect for the 2004 Indian Ocean earthquake and tsunami, a planned light show approaching the fireworks was cancelled and replaced by a moment of silence for victims of the tragedy.

=== 2011–2020 ===
Since 2010, Cambridgeshire-based Titanium Fireworks has produced the pyrotechnics for the event.

| Year | Title | Description |
|---|---|---|
| 2011‍–‍12 | "Olympic Celebration" | Themed around London's hosting of the 2012 Summer Olympics. In a one-off event, fireworks were fired outwards from the top of the Elizabeth Tower. Fireworks were launched in the shape and colour of the Olympic flag, in a display that lasted approximately eleven minutes compared to being reduced to eight minutes in 2010. |
| 2012‍–‍13 | "Best Of 2012" | The fireworks were themed around events that occurred in the United Kingdom in 2012, including achievements by Great Britain during the 2012 Summer Olympics and Paralympics, and the Diamond Jubilee of Elizabeth II. |
| 2013‍–‍14 | "City of Firsts" | The theme of the show were the many "firsts" that have come from the United Kingdom and London; the event was promoted as the first "multi-sensory" fireworks display (with sponsorship from Vodafone) - with fruit-scented mists and edible, flavoured foam sprayed throughout the performance in coordination with the visuals. |
| 2014‍–‍15 | "World Class City" | The designer of the display stated that the fireworks would focus on how London could maintain its reputation as a "world-class city". Controversially, a £10 charge was introduced by the Mayor of London, Boris Johnson, for tickets to the official viewing areas. |
| 2015‍–‍16 | "Happy Blue Year" | Mayor Boris Johnson announced a partnership with UNICEF's New Year's Resolution for Children campaign to support children affected by the Syrian civil war. Multiple London and Edinburgh landmarks were illuminated with blue lights on New Year's Eve in support of the appeal. |
| 2016‍–‍17 | "Reflections" | The display focused on reflections of the past year, with themes focusing on Great Britain's achievements at the 2016 Summer Olympics and Paralympics in Rio de Janeiro. The display also paid homage to Prince, David Bowie, and Ronnie Corbett, who all died in 2016. |
| 2017‍–‍18 | "Women 100" | The display honoured the then-upcoming centennial of women's suffrage in the United Kingdom. A series of 23 red fireworks set to Ariana Grande's "One Last Time" were launched in remembrance of the 23 people who died in the Manchester Arena bombing. |
| 2018‍–‍19 | "London Is Open" | The theme of the show was London's "relationship with Europe"; it opened with the phrase "London is open" spoken in multiple languages, and featured a sequence in which the London Eye was lit in the colours of the flag of Europe. The theme was also reflected in some of the featured songs, such as "Don't Leave Me Alone", "Stay", and "We Are Your Friends". The show was criticised by supporters of Brexit for containing political gestures. |
| 2019‍–‍20 | "British New Decade" | The display featured music and soundbites relating to the then-upcoming UEFA Euro 2020, during which London would host seven matches; including the final. |

=== 2020–present ===
Due to the COVID-19 pandemic in England, the fireworks were not held as a public event for 2020–21 due to public health orders; due to the Tier 4 restrictions in effect across the majority of England by 31 December, all gatherings were prohibited and everyone was prohibited from leaving their place of residence without "reasonable excuse". The fireworks were reformatted as a broadcast-only presentation featuring fireworks and drone shows at various locations across London. To discourage public viewing, the locations were not announced in advance.

The same format of a "live broadcast spectacular" was used for 2021–22; Mayor Sadiq Khan cited COVID-19 "uncertainties" (including what restrictions on events and gatherings, if any, would be in effect by New Year's Eve) and the possible financial impact of cancellation as factors. Khan did announce plans for a ticketed food and entertainment event at Trafalgar Square, at which the "live broadcast spectacular" would also be screened. On 20 December 2021, the Trafalgar Square event was cancelled by Mayor Khan due to concerns regarding Omicron variant, and the fireworks were thus held at unannounced locations (albeit without strict restrictions on gatherings) for the second year in a row.

On 14 October 2022, Mayor Khan announced that the New Year's Eve fireworks would return to being a public event on the South Bank for 2022–23, promoting plans for them to be "the best ever". Drone shows were also incorporated into the public event, this time over Horse Guards Parade. The London-based event agency Identity took over production of the event on behalf of the Greater London Authority.

| Year | Title | Description |
|---|---|---|
| 2020‍–‍21 | "The Power Of Hope" | The display was a broadcast-only fireworks, light, and drone show featuring various locations in London, including The Shard, The O2, Tower Bridge, and Wembley Stadium. The show featured tributes to Captain Tom's charity walk, the National Health Service (NHS), remote teleconferencing, and the Black Lives Matter movement. The finale of the show included an environmental appeal narrated by David Attenborough, while the city also promoted the event as being London's most "environmentally-friendly" New Year's Eve event. |
| 2021‍–‍22 | "Resilience Of The Nation" | The display was a broadcast-only fireworks, light, and drone show featuring various locations in London, including Royal Naval College, Greenwich, The Shard, and the Millennium Bridge (where Giles Terera delivered a poem by Tomfoolery), and featured the largest drone display ever produced in the United Kingdom. The event featured tributes to Great Britain's achievements at the 2020 Summer Olympics, Emma Raducanu's victory at the US Open tennis tournament, and Elton John. The West End Musical Choir performed an ABBA medley at Shakespeare's Globe as a tribute to the theatre industry, and closed the show by performing "Auld Lang Syne". |
| 2022‍–‍23 | "2023 With Love from London" | The display featured a theme of "love and unity"; it featured segments acknowledging the death of Elizabeth II (which included audio of the Queen, a message from Judi Dench, and an environmental appeal by Charles III), the Russian invasion of Ukraine, and commemorations of England's victory in UEFA Women's Euro 2022, and the 50th anniversary of Pride in London (including a message from Peter Tatchell). The display featured drone sequences over Horse Guards Parade, including the message "2023 with love from London", and renditions of Elizabeth II and her royal cypher. |
| 2023‍–‍24 | "London: A Place for Everyone" | The display featured segments celebrating the coronation of Charles III and Camilla (accompanied with a message from actress Helen Mirren, who has portrayed Elizabeth I and II in film), the 75th anniversary of the NHS (accompanied with a message from Stephen Fry), the 75th anniversary of the arrival of the Empire Windrush (with Charles III and Floella Benjamin reciting Benjamin Zephaniah's poem "In This World"), and the 10th anniversary of recognition of same-sex marriage in England and Wales (accompanied by a message from Mayor Sadiq Khan). |
| 2024‍–‍25 | "Hope and Unity" | The display featured commemorations to the 80th anniversary of the D-Day landings (narrated by Sir Ian McKellan), celebrating Team GB's achievements at the 2024 Summer Olympics and Paralympics in Paris (narrated by Ellie Simmonds), England's Euro 2024 campaign (narrated by Alex Scott), and looked ahead to 2025 which included a feature celebrating 25 years of the London Eye. |
| 2025‍–‍26 | “Togetherness” | The display featured the sporting successes from England’s Women’s Euro 2025 victory, England’s Women Rugby World Cup victory, Team Europe’s victory over the US in the Ryder Cup and Julian Cash and Lloyd Glasspool winning the 2025 Wimbledon doubles. It also featured the poem "What England Means to Me" by Sonny Green, and incorporated musical elements tied to the film Wicked: For Good, with fireworks in the film’s iconic pink and green colours. The display featured voice messages from Cynthia Erivo, Andrew Cotter, Zoë Lister, Alison Hammond, Celia Imrie and La Voix. |
| 2026-27 | TBD | TBD |

== Broadcast ==
The fireworks are primarily broadcast by BBC One as part of their annual New Year's Eve programme. The BBC also streams the event internationally on YouTube; the 2018–2019 show was filmed and streamed in 360-degree video.

The fireworks are broadcast by other networks as well, including ITV (which presents them during the special bulletin ITV News Including New Year Bongs) and Sky News.

== See also ==
- BBC's New Year's Eve
- London's New Year's Day Parade
- Edinburgh's Hogmanay
- America's Party on The Las Vegas Strip
- New Year's Eve in Copacabana
- Sydney New Year's Eve
- New Year's Eve in Times Square
