= Rong Wongsawan =

Thai writer and journalist (1932–2009)

Narong Wongsawan ณรงค์ วงษ์สวรรค์
- Born: 20 May 1932; Chai Nat province, Siam
- Died: 15 March 2009 (aged 76); Chiang Mai province, Thailand
- Occupations: Writer; journalist
- Spouse(s): Sumalee Wongsavun สุมาลี วงษ์สวรรค์
- Children: 2
- Writing career
- Pen name: Rong Wongsawan 'รงค์ วงษ์สวรรค์
- Notable awards: National Artist (1995)

Narong Wongsawan (Thai: ณรงค์ วงษ์สวรรค์; 20 May 1932 – 15 March 2009) was a Thai writer and journalist. He wrote under the name Rong Wongsawan (Thai: 'รงค์ วงษ์สวรรค์). Much of his writing was semi-autobiographical reflecting his experiences and reporting from different places in Thailand, and in California, where he lived in the 1960s. In both places he was a critic of the hypocrisies of the powerful, while having sympathy for the disadvantaged.

Wongsawan wrote in his native Thai language, although he spoke and read English fluently. He was also an occasional actor and personality on Thai television and film until his death in 2009. He is known for his innovations in the Thai language, and as with many Thai writers, used dialog to drive the story.

== Life ==
Wongsawan was born in the province of Chai Nat, and moved to Bangkok to go to school in the 1940s. There, he was hired by the editor of the newspaper Siam Rath, M. R. Kukrit Pramoj, to be a photographer and reporter. In Bangkok, Wongsawan developed his distinctive style of reporting, in which he visited the poorer areas of Bangkok to describe the lives of the city's disadvantaged, including the prostitutes, and their often wealthy customers. His best-known book from this early period is Sanim Soi (published in 1961; Thai: สนิมสร้อย).

In 1962, Wongsawan was sent to California to be the correspondent for the Siam Rath. While in California, he became a bartender in San Francisco to supplement his salary. He continued to send stories to the Siam Rath in his distinctive writing style, which was a combination of journalism, and story-telling. Many of the stories were about the street life of San Francisco which were developed in one of his best-selling book Lost in the Smell of Marijuana (published in 1969; Thai: หลงกลิ่นกัญชา), and later in On the Back of the Dog the Golden Sunlight (published in 1978; Thai: บนหลังหมาแดดสีทอง), a title which referred to his travels on a Greyhound bus in California, and San Francisco. On the Back of the Dog the Golden Sunlight was published in English in 2022 with the title The Man from Bangkok: San Francisco's Culture in the 60s.

In the 1970s, Wongsawan published books and articles about the relationships between Thai and Americans at the Sattahip naval base and Takli air base in Thailand during the Vietnam War.

In the 1980s, Wongsawan became known to Thai popular culture as a guest on television programs, and the occasional commercial. He appeared in at least one English language film, Saigon: Year of the Cat, where he played the role of the Foreign Minister.

Wongsawan published over 100 books between 1959 and 2005. This is in addition to his newspaper stories and photography. His writing has been described as Gonzo Journalism because Wongsawan will often inject himself into the story, remarks on his emotional responses to his subject, and does not have a pretense of objectivity. He also often lets dialog drive the story which is a feature of both Gonzo Journalism in particular, and Thai literature in general. This Gonzo style is most often associated with American writer Hunter S. Thompson, though in fact Wongsawan's writing was slightly earlier than that of Hunter Thompson.

Wongsawan was recognized as a Thai National Artist in 1995.
