= Angela Grant =

British actress

- Born: 1950 (age 75–76)
- Other name: Angie Grant
- Occupations: Actress; model
- Website: angelagrant.tv

Angela Grant (born 1950) is a British actress and model, best known for her appearances in four Carry On films, including Carry On Up the Khyber and Carry On Girls. She also appeared in a number of British films in the late 1960s and 1970s.

== Career ==
Grant began her career as a model with the Lucie Clayton Charm Academy before breaking into film and television work.

== Selected filmography ==
- Follow That Camel (1967) as harem girl (uncredited)
- Carry On Up the Khyber (1968) as hospitality girl (uncredited)
- The Assassination Bureau (1969) as 'La Belle Amie' girl (uncredited)
- Arthur? Arthur! (1969) as Cynthia
- Zeta One (1969) as Angvisa girl
- Carry On Camping (1969) as schoolgirl
- Doctor in Trouble (1970) as Doctor Dare Fan
- Tales from the Crypt (1972) as Susan Blake (segment 2 "Reflection of Death")
- The Protectors (1972) as Monica
- Carry On Girls (1973) as Miss Bangor
- Spectre (1977) as Butler
- What's Up Nurse! (1977) as Kim
- What's Up Superdoc! (1978) as Helen Arkwright
- The Zany Adventures of Robin Hood (1984) as Lady Exeter
