= Saigon: Year of the Cat =

- Screenplay by: David Hare
- Directed by: Stephen Frears
- Starring: Judi Dench; Frederic Forrest; Chic Murray; Wallace Shawn
- Theme music composer: George Fenton
- Country of origin: United Kingdom
- Original language: English

Production
- Producers: Michael Dunlop; David Hare; Verity Lambert
- Cinematography: Jim Howlett
- Editor: Oscar Webb
- Running time: 105 minutes
- Production company: Thames Television

Original release
- Network: ITV
- Release: 29 November 1983

Saigon: Year of the Cat is a British television drama from 1983, produced by Thames Television for ITV. It is directed by Stephen Frears, written by David Hare, and stars Judi Dench, Frederic Forrest, E. G. Marshall, Wallace Shawn, Chic Murray, and Rong Wongsawan.

== Synopsis ==
The year is 1974, and Barbara Dean (Judi Dench), a British assistant manager in a foreign bank in Saigon, begins a relationship with American Bob Chesneau (Frederic Forrest). She quickly realises that he works for the CIA and he knows that the fall of South Vietnam is very near.
