= Beth Porter =

American actress (1942–2023)

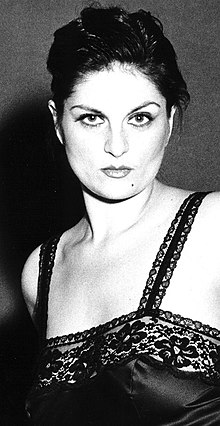
- Self-portrait in 1974
- Born: Beth Jane Porter; May 23, 1942; New York City, U.S.
- Died: August 1, 2023 (aged 81); England
- Spouse: Peter Reid (m. 1969; sep. 1974)
- Partner: Jack Clayton (1974–1979); Kerry Lee Crabbe (1979–1985)

Beth Jane Porter (May 23, 1942 – August 1, 2023) was an American stage, film and television actress and writer, who worked in Britain for most of her career. She became a British citizen in 2014.

== Early life ==
Beth Porter made her first professional appearance at age 12 in a Westchester County touring company. She studied acting on scholarship at the Stratford Connecticut Shakespeare Festival and with Helen Menken at the American Theatre Wing before completing dramatic studies at Bard College, New York University, and Hunter College at The City University of New York (CUNY).

== Career ==
After appearing in the American premiere of Jules Romains's Donogoo in 1961 at the Greenwich Mews Theatre, Isaac Babel's Sunset at the Chelsea Theater Center in 1966, and later that year as the star of David Starkweather's Ascent at The Playwrights Workshop, Porter was chosen as a member of original Obie Award-winning New York LaMaMa Troupe under director Tom O'Horgan (Hair), where she starred in the play and later film of Futz!, and featured in Paul Foster's Tom Paine and Melodrama Play by Sam Shepard. A critic declared of her co-starring role in Futz!: "Beth Porter makes the Whore of Babylon look like the Singing Nun."

Ellen Stewart and Tom O'Horgan invited Porter and her Scots husband Peter Reid to co-found the first foreign branch of La MaMa Experimental Theatre Club, based in the UK. Known as The Wherehouse La MaMa with Porter as its administrative director, it operated as a touring company throughout Europe and guest appearing at La MaMa New York. Porter featured in their plays, including Groupjuice, Little Mother by Ross Alexander, The Hilton Keen Show, Hump, a dramatization of the novel by David Benedictus.

U.S. television guest spots included Baretta and Kojak.

U.K. television roles include Thames Television's Armchair Theatre play, Verité (1973) with Richard Morant and Tim Curry, co-starring in Rock Follies of '77 (1977) and Hitchhiker's Guide to the Galaxy, in which she reprised her role as The Marketing Girl from the original radio series. Her television films include Blue Money, again with Tim Curry, and Pleasure (1994), part of the Alan Bleasdale Presents series. She guest starred with Bill Nighy in The Men's Room (1991).

Feature film roles include Reds (1981), Mrs. McKee in The Great Gatsby (1974), sister-in-law Anna to Woody Allen’s Boris in Love and Death (1975), and Yentl (1983), in which she worked as Barbra Streisand's understudy and played Sophie, Amy Irving's maid in an uncredited role. She appeared in several saucy UK comedies in the 1970s including Eskimo Nell (1975), an early feature film by Martin Campbell.

== Voice acting ==
Porter featured on Roger Waters' album The Pros and Cons of Hitch Hiking as The Wife. Her voice has been heard on re-voices and dubbings of many films. She was the White Witch in the animated version of The Lion, the Witch and the Wardrobe. She and John Ratzenberger did all the post-synch voices in John Schlesinger's Honky Tonk Freeway (1981).

== Later career ==
Porter later trained as a television script editor and producer. For BBC Television, she produced The Husband, The Wife and The Stranger, starring Adam Faith and Derrick O'Connor, and for Channel 4 Television, Unusual Ground Floor Conversion, a short film directed by Mark Herman, Little Voice. She later joined BBC Television Drama as a development executive for new drama series.

A number of her radio plays and short stories have been broadcast on BBC Radio 4.

Porter first became a journalist at age 12 when she was hired as a weekly columnist for The Patent Trader, a Westchester County newspaper chain. Years later, she served as a relief theatre critic for The Times, and contributed media-related articles to The Listener, The Guardian, and The Independent. In 1988 she became a film critic, joining The Critics' Circle and served for 10 years as London Editor for Film Journal International, with supplementary pieces for The Morning Star. Until May 2020, she continued to provide online columns for The London Progressive Journal under the byline outRageous!

Porter subsequently became a senior Web Producer for leading web-house Online Magic, part of the Omnicom Group, and she was asked to contribute to various web-related magazines including .net for Future Publishing. This led to the publication of her book, The Net Effect, for which David Puttnam contributed the foreword. 2018 was her 21st year as a nominating judge for the International Webby Awards and she has served as a contributor to policy advisers on eDemocracy issues. She was an elected Lifetime voting member of BAFTA.

In 2013 she published Resident Aliens, a collection of her short fiction for Kindle. This was followed in 2014 by a collection of her original scripts and screenplays under the umbrella title Drama Queen and in April 2016 of her autobiography entitled Walking on my Hands: how I learned to take responsibility for my life with the help of Woody Allen, Barbra Streisand, Greta Garbo, Harvey Milk, Idi Amin, Guy The Gorilla, and Frank Sinatra, among others. Its foreword is by noted author and screenplay writer Shane Connaughton (My Left Foot).

Also in 2016 Porter published both Kindle and paperback versions of Settling Beyond the Pale, a novella and six short stories about freedom and flight.

In 2018 Porter released both Kindle and paperback versions of a horror/fantasy novella titled Feeding the Twins as well as her first novel ScreenSaver!

Porter's second novel, Becca’s Providing, was published in both Kindle and paperback during the spring of 2019; it explores themes of identity and family. Porter's 3rd collection of short fiction was published in December 2019, under the title Painted Ladies.

In March 2021, Porter published Locks: a quartet of short fiction in paperback and Kindle. Her Amazon profile further stated that she was working on a collection of short and flash fiction featuring female protagonists for publication in early 2022, and was also preparing a new book promo website.

== Death ==
Porter became a British citizen in 2014. She died on August 1, 2023, at the age of 81.

== Filmography ==
=== Films ===
Year	Title	Role	Notes
1967	The Naked Witch	Beth	
1969	Me and My Brother		
1969	Futz!	Majorie Satz	
1971	Long Drawn-Out Trip: Sketches from Los Angeles	Various	Short, Voice
1974	The Great Gatsby	Mrs. McKee	
1975	Eskimo Nell	Billie Harris	
1975	Love and Death	Anna	
1975	Dick Deadeye, or Duty Done	Yum-Yum	Voice
1976	Feelings	Mrs. Lustig	
1978	The Ballad of the Daltons	Miss Worthlesspenny	Voice
1978	What's Up Superdoc!	Melanie	
1978	On a Paving Stone Mounted	American Woman	
1980	Superman II	Football Fan	Uncredited
1981	Reds		
1983	Yentl	Sophie	

=== Television ===
Year	Title	Role	Notes
1973	Thirty Minute Theatre	Joanna	Episode "The Baby's Name Being Kitchener"
1973	Armchair Theatre	Barbara	Episode "Verite"
1974	Mousey	Sandra	aka Cat and Mouse
1975	Baretta	Doreen	Episode "Nobody in a Nothing Place"
1976	Kojak	Clara	Episode "By Silence Betrayed"
1977	Seven Faces of Woman	Anne Liebowitz	Episode "She: Anxious Anne"
1977	Rock Follies of '77	Kitty Schreiber	6 episodes, 1977
1978	Crown Court	Betty Lou	Episode "Scalped"
1979	The Lion, the Witch and the Wardrobe	Jadis, The White Witch	(voice)
1979	The Deep Concern	Carrie Stone	(6 episodes)
1980	Tales of the Unexpected	Joanna Bligh	Episode "Taste"
1981	The Hitchhiker's Guide to the Galaxy	Marketing Girl	Episode #1.6
1982	Blue Money	Barmaid	
1988	Floodtide	American Woman	Season 2 Episodes 4 and 5
1988	Square Deal	Hannah	Episodes #1.1 and #1.7
1990	Ruth Rendell Mysteries	Davina Ilbert	Episode "Put on by Cunning"
1994	Pleasure	Amber	aka Alan Bleasdale Presents Pleasure
