= Sally Faulkner =

English actress (born 1946)

- Born: Sally Roberta Faulkner; 14 August 1946 (age 80); Northampton, Northamptonshire, England
- Education: Royal Academy of Dramatic Art
- Occupation: Actress
- Years active: 1968–present
- Known for: The Invasion; The Body Stealers; Vampyres; Prey; Feelings; I'm Not Feeling Myself Tonight

Sally Roberta Faulkner (born 14 August 1946) is an English actress.

In 1967, Faulkner graduated from RADA and married her husband, engineering executive Charles Nicholas Carne.

Faulkner appeared in films such as The Body Stealers (1969), Vampyres (1974), Feelings (1975), I'm Not Feeling Myself Tonight (1976), Confessions of a Driving Instructor (1976), Prey (1977), Confessions from the David Galaxy Affair (1979) and Jaguar Lives! (1979).

Faulkner's television credits include Coronation Street, Brookside, Doctor Who, Dixon of Dock Green, Z-Cars, The Sweeney, Target, The Professionals, Bird of Prey, Minder, Sherlock Holmes, House of Cards, EastEnders, Just Good Friends, The Bill, Chancer, Hope It Rains, Casualty, Pie in the Sky, Grange Hill, Wycliffe, Silent Witness and Doctors.

== Filmography ==
=== Film ===
Year	Title	Role	Notes
1968	Hot Millions	Stewardess on Rio Plane (uncredited)	Feature film
1969	The Body Stealers	Joanna	Feature film
1974	Vampyres	Harriet	Feature film
1976	Feelings	Mrs. Linden	Feature film
1976	I'm Not Feeling Myself Tonight	Cheryl Bascombe	Feature film
1976	Confessions of a Driving Instructor	Mrs. Dent	Feature film
1976	Prey	Josephine	Feature film
1979	Jaguar Lives!	Terry	Feature film
1979	Confessions from the David Galaxy Affair	Amanda	Feature film
2016	The Verity	Maybelle Adams	Short
2021	I Am	Granny	Short
2021	Poles	Mum	Short

=== Television ===
Year	Title	Role	Notes
1968	Doctor Who	Isobel Watkins	7 episodes; The Invasion
1988	Brookside	Mrs. Downs	5 episodes
1991	Coronation Street	Mrs. Maxwell-Glover	1 episode
1991	Chancer	Croupier	Episode: "Ashes"
1991	Hope It Rains	Mrs. Edwards	Episodes: "Cover Girl"
1992	Kinsey	Eva Sutton	Episode: "The Waste Watchers"
1993	Emmerdale	Barbara Ferguson	1 episode
1993	Growing Pains	Helen Barlow	Episode: "Someone to Watch Over Me"
1996	Pie in the Sky	Jan Webster	Episode: "The Other Eden"
1998	Wycliffe	Sian	Episode: "On Offer"
2002	Silent Witness	Mary Jones	Episode: Tell No Tales Part 1 & 2
2010	Identity	Mrs. Broadfoot	Episode: "Somewhere They Can't Find Me"

== Awards and nominations ==
Year	Award	Category	Production	Result
2017	Terror in the Bay Film Festival	Best Actress Award	The Verity	Nominated
2021	LA Femme Short Film Festival	Best Supporting Actress in an English Language Film	I Am	Won
