= Pauline Peart =

Jamaican actress and model (born 1951)

- Born: Pauline Peart; 31 October 1951 (age 74); Jamaica
- Occupations: Actress, Model
- Years active: 1970–present
- Children: 2

Pauline Peart (born 31 October 1951) is a Jamaican actress and model who rose to prominence from her roles in a large number of films and television series including parts in the Carry On and Hammer Horror film series.

== Early life ==
Born in Jamaica, Peart won the title of Miss Jamaica before she moved to England in 1966.

== Career ==
Making her debut as an extra in The Firechasers (1971), Peart's other film roles include Suburban Wives (1972) and Nobody Ordered Love (1972). Her breakthrough role, however, was as a vampire in the Hammer Horror film The Satanic Rites of Dracula (1973) opposite Peter Cushing and Christopher Lee. Following on from this, Peart appeared as Gloria Winch, a beauty contestant, in the comedy film Carry On Girls (1973). She then played Arthur Lowe's secretary in Man About the House (1974), the spin-off film of the sitcom of the same name. In between acting work, Peart was a model. Peart's subsequent films included Chandi Sona (1977), Sean Connery's girlfriend in Cuba (1979), The Bunker (1981) and Antony and Cleopatra (1984).

Peart's first television credit was as a girl dancing with Roger Moore in an episode of The Persuaders! in 1971, and she then had roles in series such as Here Come the Double Deckers!, Jason King, The Onedin Line, Thirty Minutes Worth, Return of the Saint and Tom, Dick and Harriet.

Peart made numerous stage appearances including in When the Wife's Away with John Inman and Jack Douglas and Birds of Paradise with Fenella Fielding and Doris Hare.

After giving up acting in the mid-1990s, Peart became a lecturer at the HCT Group, however in more recent times, she has started to appear occasionally at fan conventions in both the UK and the US and has made a return to acting after an almost thirty-year break.

In 2023 Peart appeared in the feature film The Pocket Film of Superstitions which also featured Caroline Munro, Dani Thompson and Lynn Lowry.

== Personal life ==
Peart is of Jamaican, West Indian, Chinese, Mexican, South American and Israeli heritage.

Peart is good friends with fellow Hammer actresses Caroline Munro and Martine Beswick and the three often appear together at conventions.

== Filmography ==
=== Film ===
Year	Title	Role	Notes
1971	The Firechasers	Extra	Uncredited
1972	Suburban Wives	Mavis	
1972	Nobody Ordered Love	Girl	
1973	The Satanic Rites of Dracula	Vampire Girl	
1973	Carry On Girls	Gloria Winch	
1974	Man About the House	Secretary	
1977	Chandi Sona	Girl	
1979	Cuba	Dolores	
2020	Mia	Eileen Sheridan	
2022	Our Manor	Ramsey Dalton	
2023	Video Shop Tales of Horror	The Curator	
2023	Sagittarius	Jupiter	
2023	The Pocket Film of Superstitions	The Spirit Medium	
2024	Slasher House 3	Hexagon Facility	Voice
2025	The Wrath of Thorn	The Mayor	
2025	Dracula: Rise of the Vampire	High Priestess	

=== Television ===
Year	Title	Role	Notes
1971	The Persuaders!	Girl in Nightclub	Episode: "Powerswitch"
1971	Here Come the Double Deckers!	Unknown	Unknown episode
1972	Thirty Minutes Worth	Control Panel Operator	Episode: #1.3
1972	Jason King	Unknown	Unknown episode
1973	The Onedin Line	Unknown	Unknown episode
1977	The Galton & Simpson Playhouse	Pauline	Episode: "Cheers"
1978	Return of the Saint	Unknown	Unknown episode
1981	The Bunker	Unknown	TV film
1982	Tom, Dick and Harriet	Mandy	Episode: "On the Town"
1984	Antony and Cleopatra	Unknown	TV film
