= Anulka Dziubinska =

English actress and model

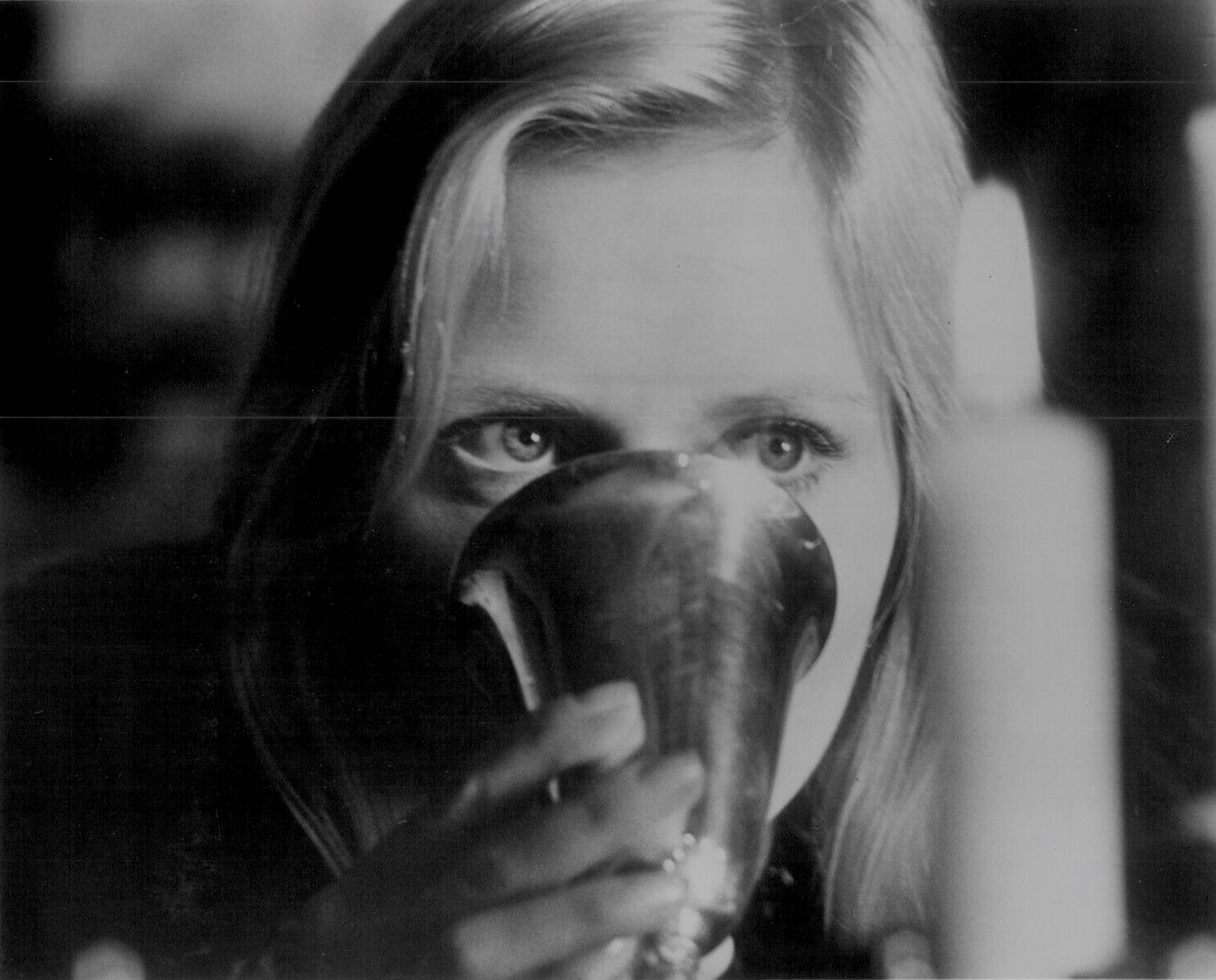
- Dziubinska in Vampyres (1974)
- Born: 14 December 1950 (age 75); Preston, Lancashire, England
- Occupations: Actress; model
- Years active: 1972–1985
- Spouse(s): Tony Fox Sales (1978–1984); Hiroshi Kitamura (1985 – )
- Children: 2

Anulka Maria Dziubinska (born 14 December 1950) is an English actress and model. She was featured as Playboy magazine's Playmate of the Month in May 1973.

After her Playmate appearance, Dziubinska became an actress of film and television, perhaps most prominently in her debut role as a lesbian vampire in the British exploitation film classic Vampyres (1974), in which she was credited by only her first name, Anulka.

Further acting assignments followed. In the late 1970s, Dziubinska moved to the USA. She continued her career and married twice. She left the public eye in 1985, however, when she became pregnant with her first child.

Later she became a floral designer and owner of a florist shop in Hollywood. She returned to Britain in 2003 for an appearance in the documentary short Return of the Vampyres, in which she shares her memories of working on the film. In 2006, she co-wrote a book about flower design, Zen Flowers: Designs to Soothe the Senses and Nourish the Soul.

== Early life and modelling ==
She was born in Preston, Lancashire, England, the daughter of George Dziubinski and Monica Harrison. Her father was born in Poland and her mother in England. She attended St John Fisher Roman Catholic School where she started acting. From age 15, she travelled most of the Western world, living at times in London, Madrid, Bilbao and Hamburg, stopping off for stays in Italy and France.

Anulka Dziubinska

Playboy centerfold appearance
- May 1973
- Preceded by: Julie Woodson
- Succeeded by: Ruthy Ross

Personal details
- Born: 14 December 1950 (age 75) Preston, Lancashire, England, UK
- Height: 5 ft 4 in (1.63 m)

Dziubinska worked as a dental nurse in Preston but found the routine too restrictive. In 1970, she was a finalist in the Miss United Kingdom beauty contest. At the Playboy Club in London, she worked as a blackjack Playboy Bunny for five months.

She spent some time in Munich, where Pompeo Posar photographed her for the August 1972 issue of Playboy, in which she appeared in the "Girls of Munich" pictorial fully clothed save for a sheer white shirt.

Dziubinska also appeared as a Page Three girl, a model featured topless on the third page of the British tabloid newspaper The Sun.

In the May 1973 issue of Playboy, Dziubinska appeared as the Playmate of the Month. Her centerfold was photographed by Posar.

She then became a professional actress and made her film debut in Vampyres.

== Acting career ==
While at a cocktail party, Dziubinska met the actor John Mills. She is quoted as saying, "I adored Hayley, so I went over to talk to him about my favourite film of all time, Whistle Down the Wind, which I've seen four million times. I said to him that I was an actress and that I'd been acting since I was at school and then I asked him if he had any advice, and he said, 'do everything you're offered, because everything you do will give you some experience!' The first thing I was offered the next day was Vampyres!"

Her role in that 1974 horror film, which was directed by José Ramón Larraz, was as Miriam, a lesbian vampire, opposite Marianne Morris. She then played Lola Montez in Ken Russell's rock musical Lisztomania (1975) and Dawn in the comedy The Likely Lads (1976). She was credited as Anulka Dubinska in the latter.

Dziubinska's first television appearances were as a girl in an episode of The New Avengers (1976) and as Pavla in two episodes of The Tomorrow People (1977). She was credited as Anulka Dubinska in the latter.

Due to the decline of the British film industry in the 1970s, Dziubinska decided to move to the USA. She went to the Writers & Artists Agency in Beverly Hills with an 8 X 10 publicity photograph and was immediately signed.

She and American musician Tony Sales were married on 20 August 1978 in Hollywood. Sales had a near fatal car accident in 1979 and was in a coma for over eight months.

Dziubinska was cast as Francis in the McLean Stevenson sitcom Hello, Larry episode "The Nude Emcee" (1979), in which she was credited as Anulka Fox Sales. Dziubinska played a tennis pro, Zora Korcek, opposite Tom Selleck's casual detective in an episode of Magnum, P.I. (1982). She played Natasha in two episodes of the soap opera Bare Essence (1983) and Sonya Louis-Dreyfus in one episode of Falcon Crest (1984) starring Jane Wyman.

A mention of Dziubinska appeared in the Los Angeles Times of 9 September 1984. Amidst the celebrity name-dropping in an article about the opening of a new sushi restaurant in Santa Monica, it reads, "Nonetheless, just as we fainted into a sea of shrimp tempura, we did note the too-late-for-the-lobster-teriyaki entrances of comedian Buck Henry with actress Anulka Dzubinski [sic]."

Her marriage with Sales ended on 18 August 1983 and they were divorced in March 1984.

Dziubinska and Japanese hairstylist Hiroshi Kitamura (born 4 April 1948) were married on 29 July 1985 in Los Angeles. She and Kitamura, the owner and head stylist of a Beverly Hills salon, had two children, Koichi George Kitamura (born 20 January 1986) and Takashi Justin Kitamura (born 19 November 1987).

== Floral designing ==
Dziubinska stated that the minute she became pregnant she gave up acting. She later worked for a while as maître d' at Matsuhisa, the original Nobu Japanese restaurant on North La Cienega Boulevard in Beverly Hills. Now using her married name, Anulka Kitamura, she converted to Buddhism. She also became the owner and head floral designer of a florist shop in Hollywood.

In 2003, she journeyed back to her native Britain for an appearance in the documentary short Return of the Vampyres, which was directed by David Gregory. She received special thanks in the credits and acknowledgment for contributing still photographs to the project, in which she and Marianne Morris share their memories of working on the 1974 film.

A practitioner of Zen Buddhism, the origins of which are ascribed to the Flower Sermon, Anulka Kitamura co-wrote with Brenda Berkley the book Zen Flowers: Designs to Soothe the Senses and Nourish the Soul (2006), which was published by Stewart, Tabori & Chang. ISBN 978-1-58479-544-5

Anulka Dziubinska Kitamura lives in Los Angeles, where she is active in the floristry trade.

== References and notes ==
Miki Garcia	Cyndi Wood	Bonnie Large	Julie Woodson	Anulka Dziubinska	Ruthy Ross
Martha Smith	Phyllis Coleman	Geri Glass	Valerie Lane	Monica Tidwell	Christine Maddox
