= Commuter Husbands =

1973 British film by Derek Ford

- Theatrical release poster
- Directed by: Derek Ford
- Written by: Derek Ford
- Produced by: Morton Lewis
- Starring: Gabrielle Drake; Robin Bailey; Heather Chasen; Robin Culver; Brenda Peters
- Cinematography: Morton Lewis; Roy Pointer
- Edited by: Roy Deverell
- Music by: Terry Warr
- Distributed by: Scotia International
- Release date: 1972
- Running time: 85 minutes
- Country: United Kingdom
- Language: English

Commuter Husbands is a British 1972 comedy film directed and written by sexploitation director Derek Ford, starring Gabrielle Drake, Robin Bailey and Claire Gordon. It is a semi-sequel to Ford's 1971 film Suburban Wives.

== Plot ==
The Story Teller enters the Penthouse Club in London, which she declares is the "front line" in the battle of the sexes, proving "that man is the most dangerous animal of them all – excepting woman". She introduces six stories about wayward husbands.

== Cast ==
- Gabrielle Drake as The Story Teller
- Robin Bailey as Dennis
- Heather Chasen as wife
- Robin Culver as John Appleby
- Brenda Peters as Lola
- Claire Gordon as Carla Berlin
- Jane Cardew as secretary
- Dick Haydon as Arthur Benbow
- Dervis Ward as Arnold
- Dorothea Phillips as wife
- Mike Britton as Peter Harris
- Nicola Austin as dream girl
- Timothy Parkes as Raymond Hardacre
- Yokki Rhodes as Trudi
- George Selway as Charlesworth

== Soundtrack ==
- "Man Is A Hunter", performed by Samantha Jones.

== Production ==
The film exists also in a version with hardcore inserts, but there is no suggestion that any of the credited cast performed hardcore.

== Critical reception ==
Monthly Film Bulletin said "An almost caricaturally British sexploiter whose infrequent and generally cold consummations are supplemented by some indulgent fantasy inserts involving ladies less coy in their abandonment than the majority of the film's characters. From the setting of London's Penthouse Club, here claimed as "the foremost casualty station in the battle of the sexes", Gabrielle Drake delivers the commentary's anthropological generalisations in tones of genteel condescension, though neither the setting, the hunting metaphors nor the refinement have much relevance to the rather wistful lusts subsequently displayed. Although the film overworks its fairly flimsy material, milking the potential comedy of its awkward situations for several laughs too many, it at least has the merit of not expecting us to take seriously the philandering of its one-dimensional characters."
