= Denys Hawthorne =

Northern Ireland actor (1932–2009)

Denys Vernon Hawthorne (9 August 1932 – 16 October 2009) was an actor from Northern Ireland who was known for his work in theatre, film, television and radio.

== Life ==
Denys Hawthorne was born into an upper middle-class Protestant family in Portadown, County Armagh in 1932; his father had a linen business. He studied law at Queen's University Belfast, and afterwards joined the Ulster Group Theatre; other actors in the company included Patrick Magee, James Ellis, Stephen Boyd and Colin Blakely. The company produced modern classics, and plays by new Irish writers including Joseph Tomelty and Brian Friel.

He moved to London. He was a success as the Old Man in The Chairs by Eugène Ionesco, at the Royal Court Theatre (1957), and also in 1960 playing Stephen Dedalus in Bloomsday, a dramatization of James Joyce's Ulysses, at the Unity Theatre. He joined the BBC radio drama repertory company, where during his career he was much in demand. He read poetry on the radio, particularly of Louis MacNeice's poetry after his death in 1963. In 1972 he became producer of BBC Northern Ireland radio drama, holding the position for 18 months.

On TV, Hawthorne appeared in Dr. Finlay's Casebook and 46 episodes of the series Within These Walls (1974–1978). He appeared as Mr Starling, the first-ever headteacher, in Grange Hill (1978), the Doctor Who adventure Trial of a Time Lord (1986), in Capital City (1989–1990), in the BBC drama Dangerfield (1995) and in the Father Ted episode Tentacles of Doom (1996).

In 1981 he appeared in Chekhov's The Seagull at the Dublin Theatre Festival, and in that year he toured with the Irish Theatre Company's production of The Scythe and the Sunset by Denis Johnston. He was with the Royal Shakespeare Company at the Barbican Centre in 1992 and 1993, appearing in Romeo and Juliet and as King Duncan in Macbeth.

He appeared in the film The Russia House (1990) and in the film In the Name of the Father (1993). He played Mr Woodhouse in the film Emma (1996).

Among several official recognitions, Denys Hawthorne was awarded a Society of Authors' prize for his dramatization of Jennifer Johnston's novel How Many Miles to Babylon?

In 1970 he married Rita Christina, becoming stepfather to her three children. His career ended after suffering a stroke which affected his memory. He died at his home in Hove, East Sussex in 2009, and was survived by his wife and stepchildren.

== Filmography ==
Year	Title	Role	Notes
1970	The Wife Swappers	Cliff	
1972	Suburban Wives	George / Kathy's husband	
1979	The Human Factor	Inspector Butler	
1984	A Private Function	Hotel Manager	
1988	Blanc de Chine	Jason	
1989	Australia	Mr. Frazer	
1990	The Russia House	Paddy	
1993	The House of the Spirits	Politician	
1993	In the Name of the Father	Appeal Judge	
1996	Emma	Mr Woodhouse	
1998	Monk Dawson	Fr Brendan Moran	
