= What's Up Superdoc! =

1978 British film by Derek Ford

- Directed by: Derek Ford
- Screenplay by: Derek Ford
- Produced by: Michael L. Green
- Starring: Harry H. Corbett; Christopher Mitchell; Melvyn Hayes; Julia Goodman; Hughie Green; Bill Pertwee; Angela Grant; Chic Murray; Beth Porter; Sheila Steafel
- Cinematography: Geoff Glover
- Edited by: David Campling
- Music by: Frank Barber; Paul Fishman
- Production company: Blackwater Film Productions
- Distributed by: Entertainment Film Distributors
- Release date: 21 March 1978
- Running time: 89 minutes
- Country: United Kingdom
- Language: English

What's Up Superdoc! is a 1978 British sex comedy film, directed and written by Derek Ford and starring Harry H. Corbett, Christopher Mitchell, Melvyn Hayes, Julia Goodman, Hughie Green, Bill Pertwee, Angela Grant, Chic Murray, Beth Porter and Sheila Steafel. It was produced by Michael L. Green. It was a sequel to What's Up Nurse! (1977), with Mitchell replacing Nicholas Field as Dr. Todd.

== Cast ==
- Harry H. Corbett as Goodwin
- Christopher Mitchell as Dr. Todd
- Melvyn Hayes as Waiter / Pietro
- Julia Goodman as Annabel
- Hughie Green as Bob Scratchitt
- Bill Pertwee as Woodie
- Angela Grant as Kim
- Chic Murray as Bernie
- Beth Porter as Melanie
- Sheila Steafel as Dr. Pitt
- Marianne Stone as Dr. Maconachie
- Milton Reid as Louie
- Mary Millington as champagne girl

== Critical response ==
The Monthly Film Bulletin said "One mildly curious aspect of this wearisomely witless slice of knockabout is the range of institutions which have apparently consented to appear, but wind up receiving some decidedly dubious publicity. The Daily Mirror supposedly perpetrates a gross example of journalistic malpractice; at the Royal Garden Hotel, a waiter not only cadges openly for a tip but is then disparaging to the guest; and at the Raymond Revuebar, a customer is obliged to flee in peril from a performer (though to judge by the tedious acts on show, this might come as something of a relief)."

Marjorie Bilbow wrote: "More a succession of sketches than a story, Derek Ford's screenplay ranges from the coy to the clever, from the blatant double meanings to a seaside postcard to a wickedly witty set piece involving Hughie Green as the hypocritical front man of a chat show – a memorably joyous treat."

In Sight & Sound, Mark Kermode called the film "awful".
