= Feelings (1974 film) =

1974 British film by Gerry O'Hara

- Directed by: Gerry O'Hara
- Written by: James Stevens
- Produced by: Carol Vogel; Jesse Vogel
- Starring: Kate O'Mara; Paul Freeman; Edward Judd
- Cinematography: Ken Hodges
- Edited by: Tony Lenny
- Music by: Pierre Dutour
- Production companies: Playpont Films; Mara Company
- Distributed by: Miracle Films
- Release date: 1974
- Running time: 90 minutes
- Country: United Kingdom
- Language: English

Feelings (also known as Whose Child Am I?, Test-tube Baby and Who's Harriet? ) is a 1974 British drama film directed by Gerry O'Hara and starring Kate O'Mara, Paul Freeman and Edward Judd. It was written by James Stevens. Its plot concerns a couple who are unable to conceive a baby and attempt artificial insemination.

== Cast ==
- Kate O'Mara as Barbara Martin
- Paul Freeman as Paul Martin
- Edward Judd as Doctor Benson
- Bob Sherman as Michael
- Frances Kearney as Helen Randall
- Ronan O'Casey as John Roberts
- Beth Porter as Mrs. Lustig
- Diane Fletcher as Renate
- Felicity Devonshire as Carrie
- Freda Bamford as Barbara's mother
- Melissa Stribling as Charlotte Randall
- David Markham as Professor Roland
- Sally Faulkner as Mrs. Linden
- Rikki Howard as Michael's Girlfriend
- Jean Gilpin as receptionist

== Reception ==
The Monthly Film Bulletin wrote: "A jolly tone of ludicrous implausibility characterises this saga of the joys and hazards of artificial insemination – frequently undercut by an insidiously condescending attitude towards homosexuality and miscegenation in some ineptly appended subplots. Benson ponderously discusses the dangers of fatherless parenthood before half heartedly inseminating a lesbian; and Helen awkwardly proffers an abortion to a white dope-smoking hippy who has accidentally received the sperm of an 'African donor' ("Oh my God, that's wild!" exclaims the girl, who later philosophically decides to have the baby). The burden of James Stevens' script, which seems to have been culled from an awkwardly dispassionate Fifties sex manual, falls on the uneasy principals, Kate O'Mara and Paul Freeman, who between sessions of grim-faced copulation cope as best they can with such lines as, "Every time we make love I feel like some sort of sperm-disposal machine, not a woman"."
