= Claire Gordon =

British film actress, comedian (1941–2015)

- Born: 16 January 1941; Cambridge, Cambridgeshire, England
- Died: 13 April 2015 (aged 74); Acton, London, England
- Occupations: Film actress; comedian
- Years active: 1958–1984
- Spouse: William Donaldson (m. 1967; div. 1975)

Claire Gordon (16 January 1941 – 13 April 2015) was an English film actress and comedian known for leading and cameo roles in many British films from the late 1950s to the mid-1980s, and for working with most of the television comedy stars of that time. She was best known for her leading roles in the cult films Konga and Beat Girl, Gordon was the subject of singer Scott Walker's song "Archangel".

== Career ==
Gordon was born 16 January 1941 in Cambridge, in England. Her father was a doctor and her mother a make-up artist who worked for Max Factor. After being photographed by chance at the Queens Ice Rink, Bayswater, for the cover of the magazine Lilliput, she was signed to a five-year contract with film agent Bill Watts and played a harem girl in the Bernard Bresslaw film I Only Arsked! (1958), before making her first stage appearance, still aged only seventeen, in Meet the Cousin, which starred Cicely Courtneidge and Jack Hulbert. The show opened at the Lyceum Theatre, Edinburgh, and it was there that she met her husband-to-be William Donaldson, later better known as Henry Root, who was just starting out as a theatrical producer.

Following a spell in repertory at the New Theatre Royal, Portsmouth, playing a Russian spy in Agatha Christie's Verdict and a gum-chewing blonde in Brighton Rock and some pre-London tours, she made her West End theatre debut on a motorbike in The Darling Buds of May at the Saville Theatre; and then played the role of Peggy, a dumb blonde film starlet, in a show-stopping scene with Michael Crawford in Neil Simon's first hit Come Blow Your Horn at London's Prince of Wales Theatre,

In 1960, she appeared in the third episode of Danger Man entitled "Josetta" playing the role of Sandra, an assassin's conspiratorial girlfriend attempting to entrap John Drake (Patrick McGoohan).

Later, at Donaldson's request, she appeared as an entirely French-speaking Lady Fifi de Winter in an improvised production of The Three Musketeers with Bruce Lacey and The Alberts, at the Arts Theatre. Donaldson's talent for presenting controversial and often money-losing shows didn't desert him; the show ran for two weeks; and Gordon made theatrical history as the first actress to appear naked on stage. ("Watch out for the bath scene; it's a breakthrough", wrote the New Statesman.) Most recently, she played the Fairy Godmother in Cinderella at the Princess Theatre, Hunstanton, and worked with Sarah Louise Young in Clive Evans's two woman show The Nunnery.

== Personal life ==
Gordon married Donaldson on 1 September 1967. A year later he inherited a fortune on the death of his grandmother. Donaldson's biographer later noted that the marriage was "not an easy one".

After it broke down, Gordon joined the Open University and went on to graduate from Middlesex University with a BA degree in English and American History and Literature.

Gordon was with Dr Stephen Ward the night that he met Christine Keeler, and with William Donaldson when the police raided and planted hash in their Chelsea flat; for which the policemen were later jailed. By the end of her life, she had been working on her memoirs and a documentary about her experiences while living in Egypt before and after the 2011 revolution.

== Death ==
Claire Gordon died of a brain tumour on 13 April 2015 in a nursing home in west London. After her death, two former "property consultants" were sent for trial on charges of fraud and conspiracy to defraud by altering her will.

== Filmography ==
=== Films ===
- 1958: Six-Five Special
- 1958: I Only Arsked!
- 1960: The League of Gentlemen
- 1960: And Women Shall Weep
- 1960: Never Let Go
- 1960: Doctor in Love
- 1960: Make Mine Mink
- 1960: Beat Girl
- 1960: Surprise Package
- 1960: The Bulldog Breed
- 1961: Ticket to Paradise
- 1961: Konga
- 1961: The Young Ones
- 1964: French Dressing
- 1964: Two Escape from Sing Sing
- 1965: Licensed to Kill
- 1968: Great Catherine
- 1970: Cool It Carol!
- 1971: Suburban Wives
- 1972: Commuter Husbands
- 1973: Sex Farm

=== Television ===
- 1958: The Dickie Henderson Half-Hour
- 1959: Garry Halliday
- 1959: Glencannon
- 1960: Saturday Spectacular
- 1960: Deadline Midnight
- 1960: Danger Man
- 1965: The Worker
- 1965: Hugh and I
- 1965: Scott On...
- 1965: The Arthur Haynes Show
- 1966: Foreign Affairs
- 1984: Play for Today
