= Vampyres (film) =

1974 erotic horror film by José Ramón Larraz

- 1975 Cambist Films poster
- Directed by: José Ramón Larraz (as Joseph Larraz)
- Screenplay by: Diana Daubeney
- Produced by: Brian Smedley-Aston
- Starring: Marianne Morris; Anulka Dziubinska; Murray Brown; Brian Deacon; Sally Faulkner; Michael Byrne; Karl Lanchbury
- Cinematography: Harry Waxman
- Edited by: Geoff R. Brown
- Music by: James Clark
- Production company: Essay Films
- Distributed by: Fox-Rank
- Release dates: 26 March 1975 (Louisville, Kentucky); 18 July 1976 (London)
- Running time: 87 minutes
- Country: United Kingdom
- Language: English
- Budget: £42,000

Vampyres is a 1974 (Note: The majority of bibliographic sources classify Vampyres as a 1974 feature (the year in which it was filmed). However, some sources categorize it as a 1975 or 1976 film: The British Film Institute classes it as a 1976 feature, as this was the year of its release there.) British erotic horror film directed by José Ramón Larraz and starring Anulka Dziubinska, Marianne Morris, and Murray Brown. Its plot follows two female lovers who, having been resurrected as vampires, lure unsuspecting travelers to their dilapidated estate to feed on their blood.

The film contains the trope of the lesbian vampire, and was targeted by film critics for its depictions of graphic violence, sex, and its presentation of female bisexuality. It was first released in the United States in 1975 by Cambist Films, and was later released in the United Kingdom in 1976.

In the years following its release, the film has garnered a large cult following.

== Plot ==
Fran and Miriam, female lovers, are shot to death in bed at a rural English country house. Resurrected as vampires, the couple lure unsuspecting people to the dilapidated estate, where they can feed on their blood.

Young couple John and Harriet drive past Fran while traveling through the English countryside. Afterward, John and Harriet decide to camp out in their caravan near the country house for several days. Harriet is perturbed by the locale, and tells John she saw another woman (Miriam) hiding behind a tree when they passed by Fran. That night, during a rainstorm, Harriet sees lights inside the home, and is startled by a figure looking into the caravan. John investigates, but finds nothing.

In the morning, a middle-aged man named Ted passes through the area, observing a single-car accident with a male decedent. Fran, again posing as a hitchhiker, gets a ride from Ted to the house. She invites him inside, where the two have passionate sex. In the morning, Ted finds a gash wound on his arm, which he attributes to a broken wine glass. After failing to locate Fran, Ted stops at John and Harriet's parked caravan, where they invite him in for coffee and bandage his wound. Ted returns to the house, waiting for Fran's return in his parked car. She returns at dusk, accompanied by Miriam and a young man, Rupert, whom the women have also lured there. That night, after Ted falls asleep, Fran joins Miriam in murdering and feeding on Rupert. After hiding the body, the women shower together. Miriam implores Fran to murder Ted soon, fearing she may become too emotionally invested.

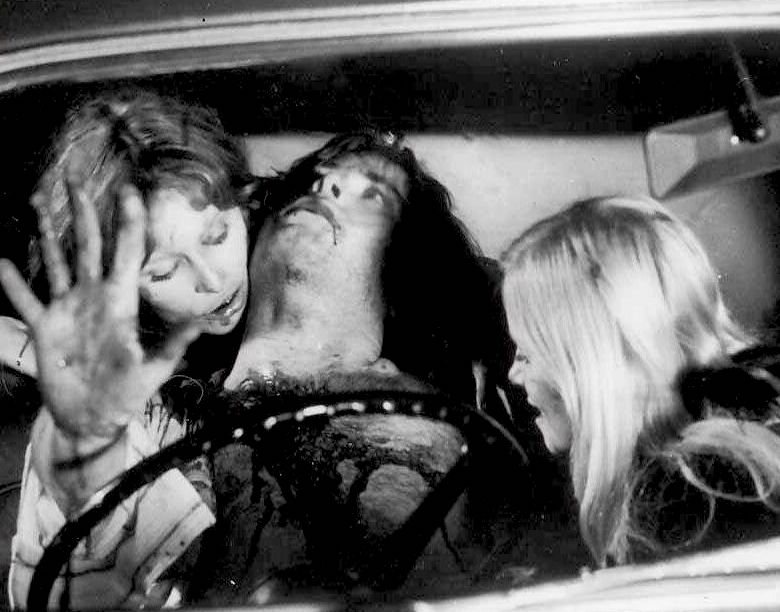
Fran and Miriam attack John in his car.

Curious about Fran and Miriam, Harriet follows the women the next morning as they walk into the woods and pass through a church graveyard. Meanwhile, Ted departs in his car, and stumbles upon another road accident scene, but is startled to see the victim is Rupert. Rattled, Ted returns to the house and inadvertently locks himself in the wine cellar. That night, Fran and Miriam return to the house and find Ted in the cellar. Fran begins feeding on his arm wound as he lies submissively. Miriam enters the room and also begins to feed on Ted's wound, followed by the women having sex as Ted lies beside them.

Harriet eventually enters the house, and finds both Fran and Miriam sleeping in darkness in the wine cellar. John confronts Harriet and ushers her out of the house, worried they will be cited for trespassing. Ted, who has lain weak with anemia in Fran's bedroom, hears the women depart and return to the house, again with a new suitor, this time a self-assured playboy. They bring him to the cellar, where they stab him to death. Meanwhile, Ted garners enough strength to stumble outside to John and Harriet's caravan. John attempts to drive to safety, but is murdered by Fran and Miriam in the car. Upon going to investigate, Harriet is attacked by Fran and Miriam, who drag her into the wine cellar and slit her throat.

At dawn, Ted stumbles back to his car in a daze. He is awoken by a realtor who assumes Ted to be a drunkard and orders him to leave. As Ted drives hurriedly away, the realtor approaches the estate with an elderly American couple interested in purchasing it. The realtor comments that the real estate agency has had trouble selling the property, as it is believed to be haunted by two women who were murdered there.

== Cast ==
- Marianne Morris as Fran
- Anulka Dziubinska as Miriam (credited as Anulka)
- Murray Brown as Ted
- Brian Deacon as John
- Sally Faulkner as Harriet
- Michael Byrne as Playboy
- Karl Lanchbury as Rupert
- Margaret Heald as Receptionist
- Gerald Case as Estate Agent
- Bessie Love as American Lady
- Elliott Sullivan as American Man

== Analysis ==
One of Vampyres' unique improvisations on the vampire genre is the decision for its vampires to feed out of a cut in the arm of victim Ted. Larraz explains his impetus behind this choice, saying, "I imagine my vampires turn almost to cannibalism, to eat somebody, to take the blood from anywhere, no matter if it is on the arm or on the balls!" Film theorist Barbara Creed called this wound "one of the most grotesque sights in the film."

Vampyres received renewed attention from film scholars in the 1990s when writers began to reassess British horror and sexploitation films from the 1970s. Analysing the film's sexual content, scholar Leon Hunt writes that "the male heterosexual narrative of Vampyres (the one which would sell the film) is an explicitly masochistic one," as the male characters in the film are relegated to "props" used for the vampires' sexual encounters with each other.

== Production ==
=== Casting ===
Anulka had been featured in Playboy's "Girls of Munich" pictorial in 1972, and appeared as the magazine's Playmate of the Month in May 1973. Vampyres was her first acting role on film.

Prior to Vampyres, Marianne Morris had appeared in Lovebox (1972), Just One More Time (1974), and Percy's Progress (1974); according to Morris, she was cast in Vampyres as Larraz had wanted someone who did not look particularly English.

Sally Faulkner, a Shakespearean stage actress, was cast in the role of Harriet. Recounting the experience, Faulkner commented that making the film was unpleasant, as she felt that Larraz was disrespectful toward both her and her co-star, Brian Deacon. "It was not that we were seeking star treatment," Faulkner said. "José was very singleminded and not supportive—he was particularly critical of me."

=== Filming ===
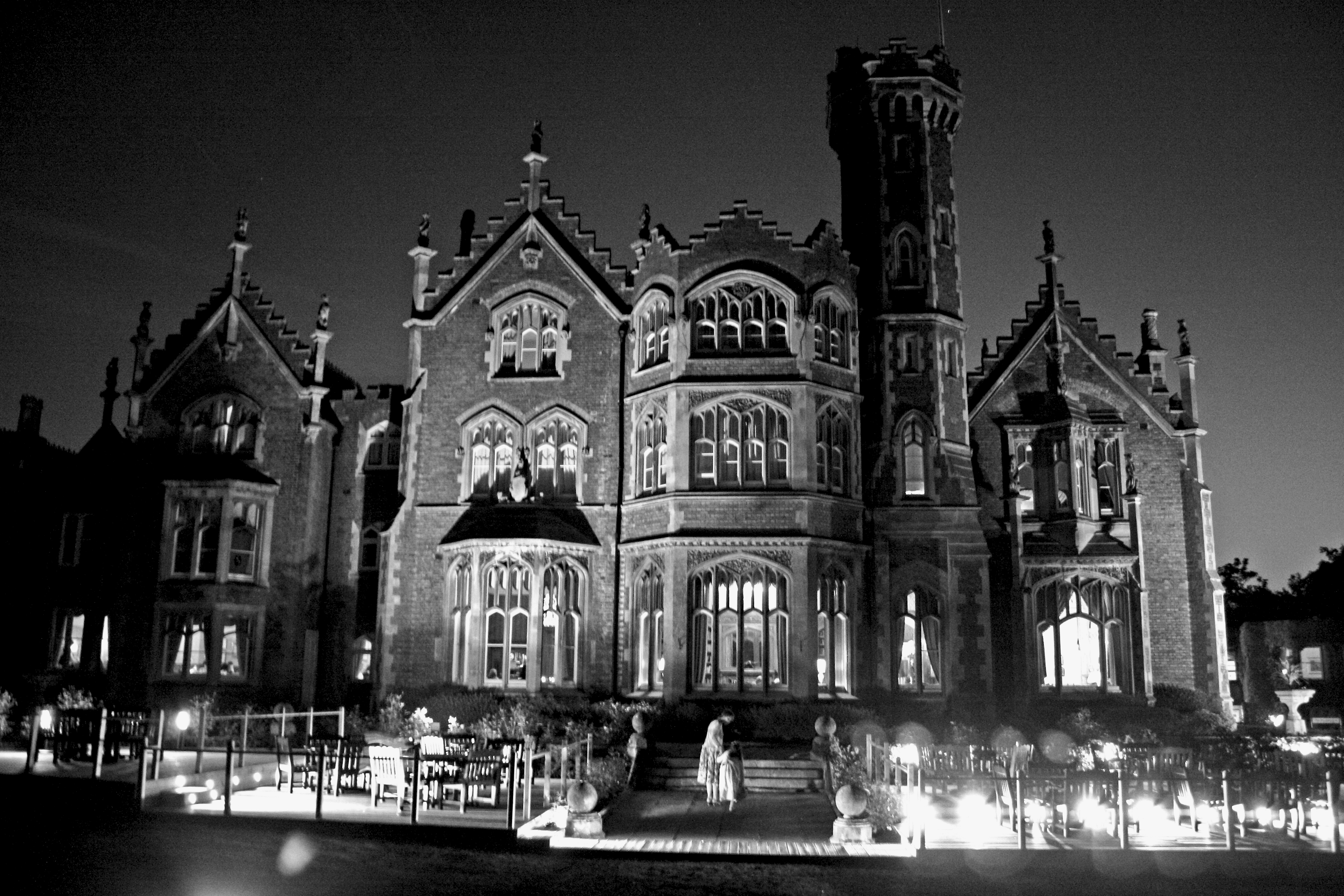
Oakley Court in Bray, Berkshire served as the exterior of the main locale in the film.

Vampyres was shot over a three-week period on a modest budget of £42,000 (equivalent to £398,000 in 2025).

Effective use is made of erstwhile Hammer horror set Oakley Court and interiors were shot in Harefield Grove, a grade-II listed, early-nineteenth-century country house in the London borough of Hillingdon, where Larraz had previously filmed Symptoms. The making of the film was briefly covered in the 1974 BBC documentary The Dracula Business.

=== Music ===
The music was scored by James Clark.

== Release ==
The film was bought by the British distributor Fox-Rank in 1974, who did not release it until 1976 as a double-feature with The Devil's Rain.

=== Censorship ===
Vampyres was distributed in the United States by Cambist, who released it uncut with an X certificate in March 1975. (Note: Contemporaneous newspaper sources from the Louisville, Kentucky Courier-Journal show a listing for the film screening on 26 March 1975.)

It was initially censored in the UK, with 2 minutes and 21 seconds of gory and sexual content cut. Larraz called this cut of the film "the Vatican version".

=== Critical response ===
Vampyres received a mixed reception, with many reviews focusing on the film's explicit depiction of female bisexuality. The Independent Film Journal suggested that the film "bares enough flesh and suggestive coupling to link it to the softcore circuit rather than the traditional horror market". Variety's Frank Segers wrote that the film "indicates b.o. [box office] potential in appropriate adult situations...combining lesbian predilections with the usual bloodthirsty vampirical ways."

The UK press response also concentrated on the film's sexual content, despite its cuts. David Pirie wrote in The Monthly Film Bulletin, "it is rare for sex and violence to be so completely and graphically integrated in a British movie (left surprisingly intact by the censor)." Screen International's Marjorie Bilbow called Vampyres "A let down for horror addicts, with fringe benefits for voyeurs."

=== Home media ===
Vampyres was released on DVD by Anchor Bay Entertainment on 9 May 2000. Blue Underground subsequently released a DVD edition on 27 May 2003, followed by a Blu-ray edition in 2010. On 22 March 2019, Arrow Video released the film in a new Blu-ray edition as part of a three-film set titled Blood Hunger: The Films of José Larraz, which also contains Whirlpool (1970) and The Coming of Sin (1978).

== Alternative titles ==
The film has been distributed under various alternative titles or with different subtitles: The Vampyres, Blood Hunger, Daughters of Dracula (not to be confused with Dracula's Daughter), Satan's Daughters (not to be confused with Daughters of Satan), Vampyres: Daughters of Dracula and Vampyres: Daughters of Darkness (not to be confused with Daughters of Darkness).

== Remake ==
A remake, also called Vampyres, was directed by Víctor Matellano and released in 2015.

== Sources ==
- Conrich, Ian (2019) [2008]. "The Divergence and Mutation of British Horror Cinema". In Shail, Robert (ed.). Seventies British Cinema. London: British Film Institute. pp. 25–35. ISBN 978-1-83871-806-0.
- Cooper, Ian (2016). Frightmares: A History of British Horror Cinema. Leighton Buzzard, Bedfordshire: Auteur. ISBN 978-0-9930717-3-7.
- Creed, Barbara (2015) [1993]. The Monstrous-Feminine: Film, Feminism, Psychoanalysis. London: Routledge. ISBN 978-1-138-12770-8.
- Greaves, Tim (1994). Vampyres: A Tribute to the Ultimate in Erotic Horror Cinema. Hampshire: 1 Shot Publications. ISBN 978-0-9650439-1-5.
- Pearce, Michael J.; Pearce, Lynn; Wisker, Gina (1998). Fatal Attractions: Rescripting Romance in Contemporary Literature & Film. London: Pluto Press. ISBN 978-0-7453-1386-3.
- Russo, Vito (1981). The Celluloid Closet: Homosexuality in the Movies. Cambridge, Massachusetts: Harper & Row. ISBN 978-0-06-337019-7.
- Smith, Gary (2017). Vampire Films of the 1970s: Dracula to Blacula and Every Fang Between. Jefferson, North Carolina: McFarland. ISBN 978-0-7864-9779-9.
