= Live into 85 =

British television special

- Genre: New Year's television special
- Presented by: Tom O'Connor
- Country of origin: United Kingdom

Production
- Production company: BBC Scotland

Original release
- Network: BBC1
- Release: 31 December 1984

Live into 85 is a New Year's Eve television special that was broadcast by BBC1 on 31 December 1984. Broadcast from the Gleneagles Hotel near Auchterarder, Scotland and presented by the English comedian Tom O'Connor, the special was themed around Scotland's Hogmanay festivities and was a retool of the BBC's then-traditional New Year's specials.

The special aimed to be more contemporary following multiple perfunctory editions and to have a broader appeal to English viewers, booking the English singer Maggie Moone and the English band Modern Romance. The show faced a number of production setbacks, including the withdrawal of Bucks Fizz and a number of on-screen incidents, including failed performances by John Grieve and Chic Murray.

Live into 85 had a poor reception by viewers and critics in England and Scotland alike, with Grieve and Murray coming in for particular criticism. The year after, the BBC ended its networked Hogmanay specials after 32 consecutive years in favour of different formats and relegated its Hogmanay-centric coverage to an opt-out on BBC1 Scotland.

== Background ==
In 1953, after having used varying outside broadcasts to mark the new year, BBC TV began to network Hogmanay-themed variety specials from BBC Scotland—such as The White Heather Club—as part of its New Year's Eve programming, which usually featured a mix of music, comedy, Highland dance, and poetry performances. They most often featured talent such as Jimmy Logan, Kenneth McKellar, Andy Stewart, and Moira Anderson, while the City of Glasgow Police choir and pipe bands also made regular appearances. The specials were often criticized for their stereotypical kitsch and tartanry, with the press also questioning whether specials based distinctly on Scottish traditions were relevant to audiences outside of the country. Stewart later defected to a competing special produced for ITV, The Hogmanay Show, a po-faced version of the BBC specials featuring himself and other Scottish acts. By the 1980s, the BBC's own Hogmanay specials had become perfunctory. Filmed in increasingly dilapidated studios and venues with rowdy audiences, their lineups comprised intoxicated, late-middle-aged performers and old-fashioned comedians whose material relied on regional humour and in-group and out-group jokes about the other Home Nations.

== Production ==
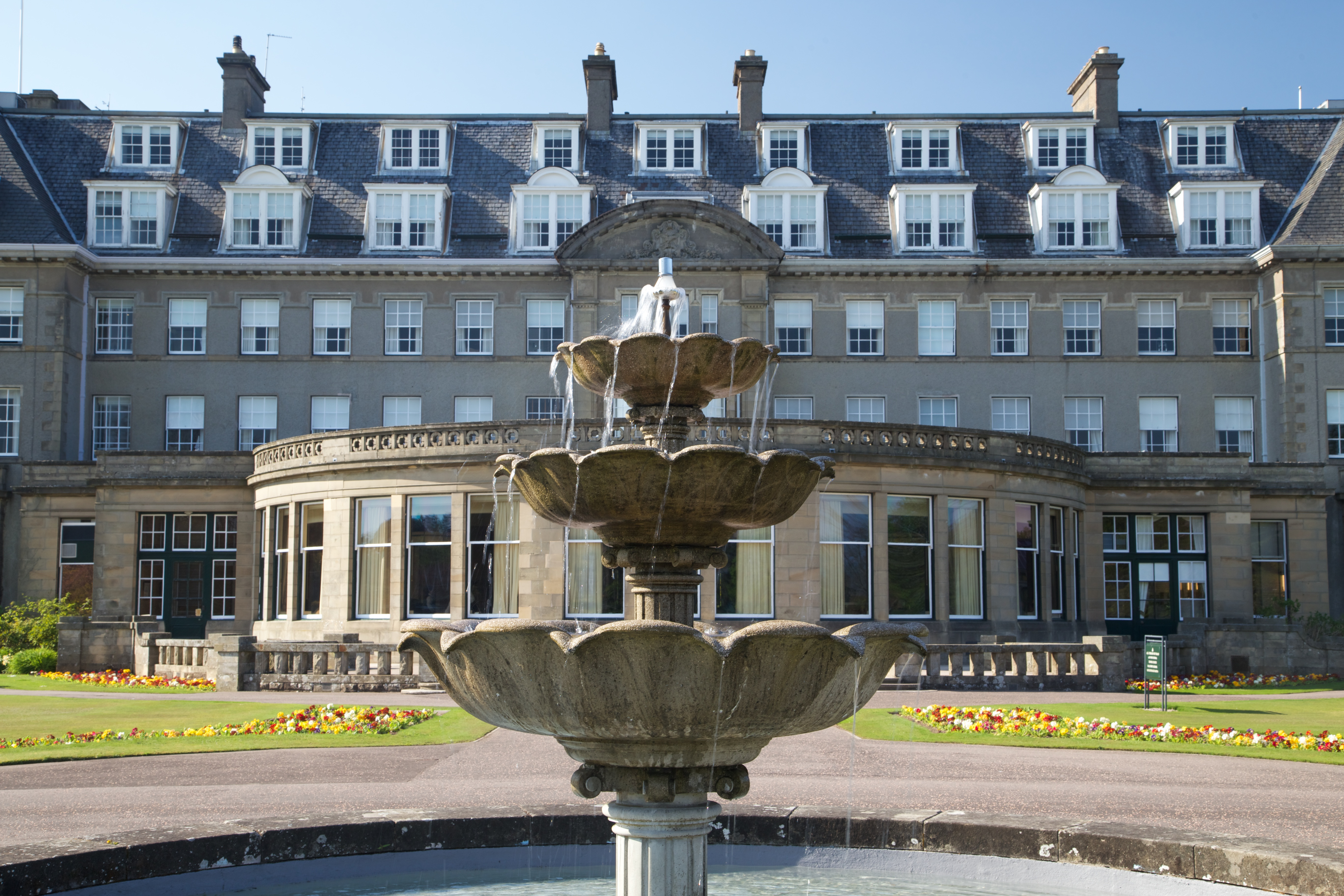
The special was broadcast from the Gleneagles Hotel.

The decision to retool the Hogmanay special for 1985 came from a younger team of producers at BBC Scotland, who desired to produce a special that would be more contemporary, and more inclusive of English viewers. The producers were also motivated by "Make it Live in 1985", a campaign announced by the English Tourism Board to promote live entertainment. The producers scouted the Gleneagles Hotel as a venue, finding it to have suitable accommodations for an outside broadcast. The Bootle-born light entertainment personality Tom O'Connor was brought on as presenter, along with the English band Bucks Fizz and the Birmingham-based singer Maggie Moone (of Name That Tune fame) as performers. A dwindling budget meant that the remaining performers and guests were drawn from Scottish talent.

Murray, who was meant to be the traditional first-foot, was in poor health at the time and would die a month later, while Bucks Fizz dropped out after a tour bus crash on 11 December and were replaced on short notice by Modern Romance. O'Connor visited Gleneagles Hotel the day before the broadcast to recce the scene, and was sufficiently disgruntled by the lack of standby recordings to badger the producer until he agreed to film one of the bands and some other segments. The day of broadcast, temperatures were no higher than 4 °C (39 °F), conditions were hazardous, and several acts were late arriving.

It became apparent that the producers had failed to secure the venue for exclusive use, resulting in an audience of rowdy hotel guests. Over the course of the broadcast, they frequently staggered into shots, distracted the cameramen, and were caught on microphones. A drunk audience member attempted to peer up Maggie Moone's skirt while she was performing, and another groped her. Meanwhile, a drunk John Grieve forgot his lines and stumbled into laughter when attempting to recite a poem, the kilted Pipes and Drums of British Caledonian Airways refused to return to the venue's freezing car park after their performance, and Chic Murray was so flustered by the continuing presence of the Pipes and Drums that he became too bewildered to perform, and spent his segment berating the floor manager.

== Reception and aftermath ==
Live into 85 was poorly received by critics in both Scotland and England and many viewers complained about the programme's poor quality. Writing for the British Comedy Guide, comedy historian Graham McCann indicated that the broadcast was taken off the air 40 minutes earlier than scheduled outside of Scotland, with the last scene shown being O'Connor—after Modern Romance's performance of "Best Years of Our Lives"—telling viewers that "you won't believe what I've just seen at the bar". He also remarked that Live into 85 was "so stupendously awful that it killed that deeply dubious broadcasting tradition [of Hogmanay] stone dead", having led both the BBC and ITV to phase out broadcasts of Hogmanay-themed specials, and observed that "the Scottish newspapers appeared to be inaugurating a period of national mourning" following its broadcast.

Norman Harper of The Press and Journal described the special as "an hour of televised tripe" and singled out Grieve and Murray for criticism, while Dennis Hackett of The Times described the special as "a shambles in content and production" and Scottish Television's offering for ITV "a close second". Retrospective reviews were not much better. Scott Murray of The Guardian wrote in December 2008 that the special was a "spectacular car-crash" and singled out Grieve's attempted contribution as "bloody awful doggerel", while the Daily Record described it in December 2012 as "one of Scotland's most embarrassing telly gaffs". Andrew Roberts of The Independent wrote in December 2014 that O'Connor "merited a special television award for maintaining his sang-froid". O'Connor would later remark that the spine of his video of the show was labelled "The Show That Died of Shame".

The following year, the BBC repeatedly reassured viewers that that year's offering would be free from bagpipes, accordions, and kilts; 1985's show began with Terry Wogan walking on stage with his flies down. No official end-of-year show was mounted for some years; 1987 featured a special New Year's episode of the BBC's soap EastEnders, while Clive James filled in seven years between 1988–89 and 1994–95 with sardonic year-in-review specials and Angus Deayton took over thereafter with a similar format. Hogmanay would not be featured in a BBC New Year's special broadcast outside of Scotland again until 1998–99, when BBC One aired New Year Live—an equally-shambolic adaptation of BBC Scotland's Hogmanay Live from Edinburgh presented by Carol Smillie and Fred MacAulay. Marking the occasion, a Mark Lamarr documentary on Live into 85 would air on BBC Two that night as part of its own New Year's Eve lineup.

== Cast ==
- Tom O'Connor - presenter
- Maggie Moone - guest
- Modern Romance - guest
- Moira Anderson - guest
- Chic Murray - guest
- Buff Hardie and Stephen Robertson - guest
- John Grieve - guest
- Bill Torrance - guest
- The Pipes and Drums of British Caledonian Airways - guest
- The Jim Johnstone Scottish Country Dance Band - guest
- The Tom McShane Dancers - guest
