= I'm Not Feeling Myself Tonight =

1976 British film by Joseph McGrath

- Directed by: Joseph McGrath
- Written by: David McGillivray; Laurence Barnett
- Produced by: Laurence Barnett; Malcolm Fancey; John Lindsay
- Starring: Barry Andrews; James Booth; Sally Faulkner
- Cinematography: Kenneth Higgins
- Edited by: Jim Atkinson; John W. Carr
- Music by: Cy Payne
- Production company: Antler Film Productions
- Distributed by: New Realm Pictures
- Release date: 26 February 1976
- Running time: 84 minutes
- Country: United Kingdom
- Language: English

I'm Not Feeling Myself Tonight is a 1976 British sexploitation comedy film directed by Joseph McGrath and starring Barry Andrews, James Booth and Sally Faulkner. It was written by David McGillivray and Laurence Barnett.

== Plot ==
Jon Pigeon and Keith Furey, odd job man at a sex research institute, invent an electronic aphrodisiac. Their invention is stolen, and they attempt to retrieve it.

== Cast ==
- Barry Andrews as Jon Pigeon
- James Booth as S.J. Nutbrown
- Sally Faulkner as Cheryl Bascombe
- Ben Aris as Trampas B. Hildebrand
- Billy Hamon as Keith Furey
- Ronnie Brody as neighbour
- Freddie Earlle as cowboy
- Bob Godfrey as postman
- Marjie Lawrence as caretaker's wife
- Brian Murphy as caretaker
- Chic Murray as Fred
- Graham Stark as hotel M.C.
- Katya Wyeth as Wendy
- Rita Webb as tea lady
- Steve Amber as policeman
- Penny Croft as traffic warden
- Robert Dorning as man at party
- Mike Grady as boy scout
- Sally Harrison as woman on video tape
- Geraldine Hart as Mrs. Watchtower
- Bill Maelor-Jones as lecturer
- Juliette King as Heidi
- Andria Lawrence as Mrs. Nutbrown
- Gracie Luck as Mrs. Hildebrand
- Gennie Nevinson as Vera
- Marianne Stone as consultant
- Pat Astley as Barmaid
- Jeannie Collings as Sylvia
- Mary Millington as girl in sunglasses
- Andee Cromarty as party guest
- Monika Ringwald as party guest

== Production ==
The film was shot at Twickenham Studios.

== Critical reception ==
The Monthly Film Bulletin wrote: "Yet another reworking of the male chauvinist's dream theme – the surefire aphrodisiac – lifted to a degree by an unusual hint of sophistication in the script, a decent caricature of a Teddy-rocker by Billy Hamon, and one modestly funny running gag in which a M*A*S*H-like tannoy periodically bleats out inane announcements in the background ('Coitus has started in Room 26 – please do not interrupt us!'). For the rest, however, the British sex-comedy formula is rigidly and tiresomely adhered to, complete with continuous sexual innuendo, pop-eyed double-takes, bouncing breasts and unconsummated couplings. In other words, the usual compendium of Anglo-Saxon hang-ups played for laughs – and losing."

Kim Newman wrote in Empire, "I'm Not Feeling Myself Tonight has a classic fnarr-fnarr title and the worst male and female fashions of 1975 (no wonder characters are always trying to take their clothes off), and mixes excruciating comedy with a vaguely offensive plot about a raygun which turns repressed Britons into sex maniacs."
