= Christopher Mitchell (actor) =

English actor (1948–2001)

- Born: Christopher Mitchell Driver; 21 May 1948; Surrey, England
- Died: 22 February 2001 (aged 52); King's Lynn, Norfolk, England
- Occupation: Actor
- Years active: 1967–1991
- Parent: Norman Mitchell

Christopher Mitchell Driver (21 May 1948 – 22 February 2001) was an English actor known for his role in the BBC sitcom It Ain't Half Hot Mum as Gunner Nigel 'Parky' Parkin.

== Career ==
He was born in Surrey, and after attending a private drama school performed in repertory theatre, and as a model in television adverts for Macleans toothpaste. His early television roles included small parts in Dixon of Dock Green and Z Cars, and his film credits include Here We Go Round the Mulberry Bush (1967), This, That and the Other (1969), The Sex Thief (1973) and What's Up Superdoc! (1978).

From 1974 to 1981, Mitchell played Gunner Nigel "Parky" Parkin in the sitcom It Ain't Half Hot Mum, which drew him to national attention. He appeared in two episodes of Only Fools and Horses ("May the Force Be With You" in 1983 and "To Hull and Back" in 1985), playing policeman Terry Hoskins. In addition he had parts in many other comedies such as: Keeping Up Appearances; Never the Twain and That's My Boy.

== Death ==
He died from liver cancer at the age of 52, a month before his father, actor Norman Mitchell, and in the same year as Kenneth MacDonald, another actor with a role as a gunner in It Ain't Half Hot Mum, who died of a heart attack aged 50.

== Filmography ==
=== Film ===
Year	Title	Role
1967	Here We Go Round the Mulberry Bush	Tony
1969	This, That and the Other	Carl
1973	The Sex Thief	Wensleydale
1978	What's Up Superdoc!	Dr. Todd

=== Television ===
Year	Title	Role	Notes
1967	Emergency Ward 10	Ron Lee	One episode
1967	Seven Deadly Virtues	Gordon Mather	One episode
1968	Sam and Janet	Ron	One episode
1968	Cold Comfort Farm	Bounder	One episode
1968	Dixon of Dock Green	Pete	One episode
1969	Strange Report	Jay Brand	One episode
1969	Detective	Billy Smith	One episode
1969—1970	Take Three Girls	Edwin	Five episodes
1970	Ours Is a Nice House	Simon	One episode
1971	Z-Cars	Bob	Three episodes
1971	The Fenn Street Gang	Edgar	One episode
1972	The Shadow of the Tower	First Guard	One episode
1972	Alcock and Gander	Harry	One episode
1972	Emmerdale	Norman Harrison	Three episodes
1973	Arthur of the Britons	Barth	One episode
1974—1981	It Ain't Half Hot Mum	Gunner "Parky" Parkin	Fifty-six episodes
1974	The Protectors	Juan	One episode
1974	Doctor at Sea	Doctor	One episode
1976, 1995	This Is Your Life	Himself	Two episodes
1976	The Cedar Tree	Alan Chapman	Two episodes
1977	No Appointment Necessary	Garth	One episode
1978	Come Back Mrs. Noah	The Butler	One episode
1979	You're Only Young Twice	Junior	One episode
1980	Crossroads	Det. Const. Hardiman	Four episodes
1980	Watch This Space		One episode
1980	Born and Bred	PC Willis	One episode
1980	The Professionals	Simms	One episode
1983, 1985	Only Fools and Horses	Terence Hoskins	Two episodes
1983	That's My Boy	Mike	One episode
1988	Never the Twain	Norman the barman	Two episodes
1989	Mr Majeika	Ron Bigmore	Five episodes
1990	The Bill	Prison officer	One episode
1991	Keeping Up Appearances	The porter	One episode
1991	Minder	Customer in Winchester	One episode
1995	Omnibus	Himself (archive footage)	One episode
