= Derek Ford =

British film director (1932–1995)

- Born: 6 September 1932; Tilbury, Essex, England
- Died: 19 May 1995 (aged 62); Bromley, Kent, England
- Occupation: film director/writer
- Years active: early 1960s – late 1980s
- Spouse: Valerie Ford (divorced)

Derek Ford (6 September 1932, Essex – 19 May 1995) was an English film director and writer, most famous for sexploitation films such as The Wife Swappers (1970), Suburban Wives (1971), Commuter Husbands (1972), Keep It Up, Jack (1973), Sex Express (1975) (also filmed in a graphic hardcore version), What's Up Nurse! (1977) and What's Up Superdoc! (1978).

== Career ==
Ford began as a writer in collaboration with his brother Donald Ford (died 1991), originally for radio before progressing to television (The Saint, Adam Adamant Lives!) and film (The Yellow Teddy Bears, The Black Torment, A Study in Terror and Hell Boats). Ford's first foray into directing, Los Tres Que Robbaran Una Banco, made in Spain in 1961 was an unhappy experience, around the same time Ford entered sexploitation when he was asked to re-edit and film additional sequences for a Swedish sex film called Svenska Flickor I Paris, eventually released as Paris Playgirls.

Ford's directing career began proper in the late sixties when he entered into partnership with producer Stanley Long, resulting in three films including the massively successful The Wife Swappers, released in America as The Swappers with the tag line "remember when all the guy next door wanted to borrow was your lawnmower?".

Ford's early seventies films were mainly shot in London and Maldon, Essex where he lived, while hardcore scenes meant for the European versions of his films were shot in secret at his own house, with his then wife Valerie acting as assistant, wardrobe & makeup. Interviewed in the book, Keeping the British End Up, fellow director Ray Selfe referred to Ford as "a male nymphomaniac", and themes of swinging, wife swapping and outwardly respectable people living double lives run throughout Ford's work.

In the 1970s the two most well-known Ford films in America were Groupie Girl (1970) and Sex Express (1975) starring Heather Deeley. Released as Diversions in the U.S., Sex Express premiered in the Kips Bay area of Manhattan and was nominated for best foreign film by the Adult Film Association of America.

In Italy he directed Erotic Fantasies (1978) a.k.a. Proibito erotico and back in England he quit as the director of Don't Open till Christmas (1984). In the mid-eighties after his divorce, Ford was left to bring up his two children on his own. At this time he attempted to find more mainstream work and dissociate himself from his past, but what little work came his way would drag him back to exploitation film. He directed La Casa delle Orchidee (The House of Orchids) in Italy in 1983, in which (returning to the themes of The Wife Swappers) a group of Italian women join a 'dare club', and co-directed a Hills Have Eyes rip-off in Sweden called Blood Tracks which also features a brief cameo role from Ford as a location scout for a rock video (Ford's only other known acting role is as "Circus Santa Claus" in Don't Open Till Christmas). He was also involved in writing a never-made softcore sitcom called Park Lane. Ford's final film, The Urge to Kill, starring Peter Gordeno & Sarah Hope-Walker has never been given an official release, although clips from it appear in the 2005 documentary The Wild, Wild World of Dick Randall, and several bootlegs of it have surfaced over the years. The film was eventually given an official DVD release in France on 1 April 2014 by the Uncut Movies label.

At the close of the eighties Ford left the film business and attempted a second career as an author, writing two books. The two books he wrote were Panic on Sunset (1989), and The Casting Couch (1990) ("the true story of broken dreams, disillusionment and fallen idols"). Panic on Sunset concerns George Schapner, the stressed out manager/agent of Velma Torraine a vamp of the silent screen whose heavy Brooklyn accent spells the end of her career as the 'talkie' era approaches. A visit to a Hollywood whorehouse specialising in celebrity look-a-likes provides George with an unlikely solution to their problem. The Casting Couch was a collaborative effort with the late agent Alan Selwyn, and is credited under the joint pseudonym "Selwyn Ford". Confusingly the book portrays Selwyn Ford as an actual person. A non-fiction expose of early Hollywood à la Hollywood Babylon, among the allegations in the book are that Joan Crawford once appeared in a stag film (in a chapter entitled "Joan Crawford – A Star is Porn"), and that Bella Darvi had worked as a prostitute in a Parisian brothel of which Ford had "benefited from a conducted tour of in 1959". One of the final chapters "The Long Killing of Marilyn", alleges Marilyn Monroe was murdered as a result of an affair with Robert F. Kennedy. Ford bases this assumption on a meeting "Selwyn Ford" had with the actor Peter Lawford, in 1984 over a never made, Italian financed film called Bloody Mary, in which an actress is abducted and forced to have an abortion after having an affair with a powerful, married man. Upon reading the script Lawford is said to have remarked "are you crazy, do you want to get us all fucking killed", and walked off. Ford's conclusion was that Lawford had interpreted the script as having parallels with Monroe and Kennedy (something Ford denies in the book), and that Lawford's heated reaction validates his claims over Monroe's death. Recent evidence uncovered by filmmaker Philippe Mora would appear to offer credibility to Ford's claim. A third book Bella, about Darvi and Darryl Zanuck was never completed, Ford died after a heart attack in a branch of WH Smith.

Ford's 1975 film The Sexplorer a.k.a. The Girl From Starship Venus garnered a famous fan in director Quentin Tarantino. Tarantino, who owns a private print of the film, commented; "Even as a kid I knew I would get things from The Girl From Starship Venus that I wouldn't get from the Hollywood films". It is regularly screened at "The Best of QT Fest" presented by the Austin Film Society and uStudio, where Quentin brings the best of his personal collection of movies. Tarantino also showed the film at the "LA Grindhouse Film Festival" at the New Beverly Cinema in March/April 2007.

== Filmography ==
- This, That and the Other (a.k.a. This, That and the Other) (1969)
- Groupie Girl (1970)
- The Wife Swappers (1970)
- Secret Rites (1971)
- Suburban Wives (1971)
- Commuter Husbands (1972)
- Keep It Up, Jack (1973)
- Sex Express (1975)
- The Sexplorer (1975)
- What's Up Nurse! (1977)
- What's Up Superdoc! (1978)
- Erotic Fantasies (a.k.a. Proibito erotico) (1978)
- La Casa delle Orchidee (a.k.a. For Members Only) (1983)
- The Urge to Kill (1989)

== See also ==
- Stanley Long
- Pete Walker (director)
- Norman J. Warren
