= The Wife Swappers =

1970 British film by Derek Ford

- Theatrical release poster
- Directed by: Derek Ford
- Written by: Derek Ford; Barry Jacobs; Stanley Long
- Produced by: Stanley Long
- Starring: James Donnelly; Larry Taylor; Valerie St. John; Denys Hawthorne; Bunty Garland
- Cinematography: Stanley Long
- Music by: John Fiddy
- Distributed by: Eagle
- Release date: 9 September 1970
- Running time: 82 min
- Country: United Kingdom
- Language: English
- Budget: £50,000
- Box office: over £1 million (UK)

The Wife Swappers is a 1970 British drama documentary film by sexploitation director Derek Ford and starring James Donnelly, Larry Taylor, Valerie St. John and Denys Hawthorne. It was written by Ford, Barry Jacobs and Stanley Long, and produced by Long. It was released in the US as The Swappers.

== Cast ==
- James Donnelly as Paul
- Larry Taylor as Leonard
- Valerie St. John as Ellen
- Denys Hawthorne as Cliff
- Bunty Garland as Sheila
- Sandra Satchwith as Carol
- Fiona Fraser as Marion
- Joan Hayward as Jean

== Response ==
=== Box office ===
The film was a huge commercial success relative to its budget.

=== Critical ===
Monthly Film Bulletin said "Dramatised documentary inquiry into wife swapping, on the lines of previous voyeuristic exposés of similar scandals. The thesis is that while the practice is as yet a minority social phenomenon largely confined to the affiuent middle classes, it is on the increase – and so cinemagoers need this salutary warning about "a game of increasing risk and diminishing returns". This warning is delivered by means of a series of cautionary stories interspersed with interviews and comments from an alleged psychiatrist on group sex. The dramatised episodes – which range from the adventures of an innocent couple duped aboard a houseboat to the sado-masochistic proclivities of "Dare Club" members – are characterised by banal scripting and stiff, amateurish acting, which makes for some presumably unplanned moments of comedy. But the fictional content is as nothing compared to the interviews, particularly one with the editor of a contact magazine, which have to be heard to be appreciated."

Variety said "This is one of those finger-wagging pix that, posing as an "in depth" revealing exposure of shocking facts, is really simply a rather clumsy attempt at titillation in which it fails singularly. Poor scripting, leaden direction and barely adequate thesping don't help."

== Releases ==
The film was released on UK DVD in January 2007 on the Slam Dunk Media Label. (A US DVD release on the Jeff films label is an unauthorized bootleg.)
