= Chic Murray =

Scottish comedian and actor (1919–1985)

- Born: Charles Thomas McKinnon Murray; 6 November 1919; Greenock, Renfrewshire, Scotland
- Died: 29 January 1985 (aged 65); Edinburgh, Scotland
- Occupations: Comedian, actor

Charles Thomas McKinnon "Chic" Murray (6 November 1919 – 29 January 1985) was a Scottish comedian and actor. He appeared in various roles on British television and film, most notably in the 1967 version of Casino Royale, and portrayed Liverpool Football Club manager Bill Shankly in a musical.

== Life and career ==
Murray was born in Greenock, Renfrewshire. He began his career as a musician in amateur groups such as "The Whinhillbillies" and "Chic and His Chicks" while an apprentice at the Kincaid shipyard in 1934. Maidie Dickson (1922–2010) - Murray's future wife - was already a seasoned star in her own right (having worked since she was 3, when she was playing the Greenock Empire). Chic's mother was the welfare officer and put Maidie up in her home. Subsequently, Maidie gave Chic parts within her own act and he formed a double-act with her. Billed as "The Tall Droll with the Small Doll" (he was 6'3" tall, she was 4'11") and also as "Maidie and Murray", their combination of jokes and songs made them popular on television and in theatres throughout the country. Their success peaked in 1956 when they were selected to appear in the Royal Variety Performance at the London Palladium, but, due to the Suez Crisis, the show was cancelled. Maidie and Chic had had much success at the Prince of Wales Theatre in London.

Later, working as a solo act, with a forbidding expression and omnipresent bunnet, Murray offered a comic vision of the world that was absurd and surreal. One example was his early-1970s BBC Scotland series Chic's Chat, where his version of acting as DJ for the (occasional) records he played was unique. The show also featured surreal dialogues with a "man at the window" of his studio, played by Willie Joss, who invariably referred to Murray by the name of "Chips". Another was his eccentrically decorated hotel in the Bruntsfield area of Edinburgh, which did not outlive the 1980s.

Murray acted in films such as Casino Royale and Gregory's Girl, in which he played a Scottish secondary school headmaster. He also played former Liverpool Football Club manager Bill Shankly in the musical play You'll Never Walk Alone. Just prior to the show opening, Murray claimed to have telephoned the switchboard at Anfield using his Shankly voice, causing the receptionist – who had worked there in the Shankly years – to burst into tears on hearing his voice once more. He also made cameo appearances as an itinerant poacher in a few episodes of STV's soap Take The High Road (1984) and appeared alongside Judi Dench in Saigon: Year of the Cat (1983) as a bank manager.

One of Murray's last TV appearances was as a first-footer on the BBC Scotland Hogmanay show Live into 85, an ill-fated programme that was notorious for its numerous problems during the live broadcast, including Murray himself who appeared flustered and confused by the various incidents involved, and became too bewildered to perform and spent his segment berating the floor manager.

He died in Edinburgh in 1985 after he suffered a perforated ulcer at the age of 65, next door to his former wife Maidie's bedroom. (They had divorced in the 1970s but remained on good terms.) Tributes during his funeral at Mortonhall Crematorium were led by fellow Scottish comedian Billy Connolly. Maidie Dickson died in Edinburgh in 2010, at the age of 88.

== Legacy ==
The Chic Murray Story was a play written by Andrew Dallmeyer and performed by Doug Healy at the 1997 Edinburgh Fringe Festival. Although initially successful, later performances led to legal threats from the Murray family who felt the use of his material breached copyright.

Chic Murray: A Funny Place for a Window, written and directed by Stuart Hepburn, and starring Dave Anderson in the title role, was performed in the A Play, a Pie and a Pint lunchtime series of plays at the Òran Mór in Kelvinside, Glasgow in May 2018. Chic's wife, Madie Dickson was played by Maureen Carr. The third member of the cast, Brian O'Sullivan, played 'the ensemble'. The Glasgow Herald review of the play said, '"The most animated thing in the production was the energetic and multi-talented O’Sullivan charging on and off stage as he switched characters." A performance was filmed for the BBC and broadcast on 1 September 2019.

In 2005, Murray was named The Comedian's Comedian, in a poll where comedians chose their favourite or most influential comedian.

Neither Here nor There is a BBC Radio 2 programme about Murray's life, devised and scripted by Simon Treves and originally broadcast in August 2007.

== Filmography ==
Year	Title	Role	Notes
1967	Casino Royale	Chic	
1973	Secrets of a Door-to-Door Salesman	Policeman	
1976	I'm Not Feeling Myself Tonight	Fred	
1976	The Ups and Downs of a Handyman	P. C. Knowles	
1977	What's Up Nurse!	Aquarium Proprietor	
1978	What's Up Superdoc!	Bernie	
1979	Can I Come Too?	Manny McTavish	short
1981	Gregory's Girl	Headmaster	
1982	Scotch Myths	Sir Rhosis Hue McRose of Glen Liver / manservant	written and directed by Murray Grigor
1983	Saigon: Year of the Cat	Mr. Haliwell	TV movie
