= Nicholas Field =

British actor

Nicholas Field (born 5 August 1948) was a British actor of the 1970s and early 1980s. He was probably best known for his role as the doctor in What's Up Nurse! (1977). He also appeared in Lady Caroline Lamb (1973), The Adventures of Sherlock Holmes (1984), and the TV mini-series The Fortunes of Nigel (1974). In 1975 he made an appearance in the "Tonight and Every Night" episode of Z-Cars.

== Selected filmography ==
- Lady Caroline Lamb (1973)
- The Fortunes of Nigel (1974)
- Z-Cars (1975)
- Holding On (1977)
- What's Up Nurse! (1977)
- Tales of the Unexpected (1983)
- The Adventures of Sherlock Holmes (1984)
