= Suburban Wives =

1972 British film by Derek Ford

- Theatrical release poster
- Directed by: Derek Ford
- Written by: Derek Ford
- Produced by: Morton Lewis
- Starring: Eva Whishaw; Maggie Wright; Gabrielle Drake
- Cinematography: Bill Holland; Roy Pointer
- Edited by: Terry Keefe
- Music by: Terry Warr
- Distributed by: Butcher's Film Service
- Release date: 1971
- Running time: 87 minutes
- Country: United Kingdom
- Language: English

Suburban Wives is a 1971 British sex comedy directed and written by Derek Ford and starring Eva Whishaw, Maggie Wright, and Gabrielle Drake.

== Plot ==
Newspaperwoman Sarah narrates a series of separate stories about the lives of various couples. Sarah describes a situation in which dissatisfied and bored middle-class housewives seek excitement and adventure outside their marital homes— and marital beds.

== Cast ==
- Eva Whishaw as Sarah
- Barry Linehan as John's Boss
- Heather Chasen as Kathy Lambert
- Gabrielle Drake as secretary
- Richard Thorp as Sarah's husband
- Robin Culver as photographer
- Maggie Wright as Irene
- Peter May as John
- Claire Gordon as Sheila
- Denys Hawthorne as George Lambert
- Jane Cardew as Carole
- Nicola Austin as Jean
- Pauline Peart as Mavis
- James Donnelly as Client
- Paul Antrim as bookmaker

== Critical reception ==
Monthly Film Bulletin said "An uneasy attempt to marry a thin veneer of pseudo-documentary to a series of O. Henry-ish but determinedly naughty tales, with the whole thing heavily laced by doses of nudity and titillation. With the possible exception of Kathy's story, nicely timed and beautifully acted by Heather Chasen, there is very little wit in evidence, and the film simply drags coyly on and on."

It was described by The New York Times as "a spicy satire of modern manners and mores."

According to Leon Hunt the film represents the suburban wives as both "banal and voracious, passive and rapacious, timid and uncontainable. The Daily Mirror described the characters as a "monstrous regiment of frustrated wives".

Stephanie Dennison sees it as an example of "soft-core porn films" that represent "naughty suburban housewives" as part of "democratization of female sexual desire".
