= Miracle Films =

British film distributor

Miracle Films (later to become "Miracle Communications" in a development of the family business) was a film distributor based in the United Kingdom. The publicity manager of the studio, when it began in the 1950s, was British filmmaker Tony Tenser.

The head of the company in the late 1970s, Michael Myers, had the dubious distinction of having his name used for the main character (a homicidal maniac) in the multi-million-dollar Halloween film franchise begun by director John Carpenter and producers Irwin Yablans and Moustapha Akkad in 1978, after Myers successfully distributed Carpenter's earlier film, Assault on Precinct 13, in the UK in 1977.

Miracle Films also distributed several films directed by cult filmmaker Pete Walker, including Cool It Carol!, The Flesh and Blood Show, House of Whipcord and Frightmare.

The company's most notable release, and possibly one of its last, was The Care Bears Movie from 1985.
