= Penny Irving =

British actress

- Born: Paisley, Scotland
- Occupations: Actress; model
- Years active: 1972–1981

Penny Irving is a Scottish-born former actress and a Page 3 model in The Sun newspaper.

== Career ==
Irving is best remembered for her roles in the 1970s sitcom Are You Being Served? (as Miss Bakewell, Young Mr Grace's secretary), appearing between 1976 and 1979 in the long-running programme; and in the movie adaptation of The Likely Lads (playing the role of Sandy).

Irving also starred in Pete Walker's 1974 film House of Whipcord, and would later appear in his 1978 film The Comeback.

Her other TV credits include The Benny Hill Show, The Two Ronnies and Hi-de-Hi!, among many others. She was a hostess on the game show Mr & Mrs in the 1970s. She also played a role in Carry On Dick.

== TV roles ==
Year	Title	Episode	Role
1974	The Prince of Denmark	Various	Polly
1975	Dad's Army	"My Brother and I"	Chambermaid
1976–1979	Are You Being Served?	Various	Miss Bakewell
1977	Spectre	TV film	First Maid
1977	Mr. Big	"The Gravy Train"	Linda
1980–1981	Hi-de-Hi!	Various	Mary

== Filmography ==
- Tiffany Jones (1973) – Girl at pool party (uncredited)
- Big Zapper (1973) – Maggie
- House of Whipcord (1974) – Ann-Marie Di Verney
- Carry On Dick (1974) – Lizzy – Birds of Paradise Entertainer
- Percy's Progress (1974) – Chiquita
- Vampira (also known as Old Dracula - 1974) – Playboy Bunny
- The Likely Lads (1976) – Sandy
- The Bawdy Adventures of Tom Jones (1976) – Serving Wench (uncredited)
- Aces High (1976) – French Girl
- Are You Being Served? (1977) – Miss Nicholson
- The Comeback (1978) – Girl Singer
