= Alan Curtis (British actor) =

British actor (1930–2021)

- Born: Alan Vernon Curtis; 30 July 1930; Coulsdon, Surrey, England
- Died: 18 February 2021 (aged 90); Chiswick, London, England
- Occupations: Actor, public address announcer
- Years active: 1956–2003
- Spouse: Pamella Guard (m. 1964, div. 1967)

Alan Vernon Curtis (30 July 1930 – 18 February 2021) was an English actor and cricket announcer.

== Life and career ==
Curtis was born in Coulsdon, Surrey in July 1930. He had a long career in film, television and theatre, which included appearances in four films of cult director Pete Walker.

He also served as an announcer for the MCC at Lord's Cricket Ground for 28 years.

Curtis lived in Chiswick, where he died in February 2021 aged 90.

== Filmography ==
=== Film ===
- Ladies Who Do (1963) – Second Businessman (uncredited)
- Tomorrow at Ten (1965) – Inspector
- Agente Logan - Missione Ypotron (1966) – Streich
- Carry On Henry (1971) – Conte di Pisa
- Die Screaming, Marianne (1971) – Sloopy's Manager
- Four Dimensions of Greta (1972) – Carl Roberts
- The Flesh and Blood Show (1972) – Jack Phipps
- Carry On Abroad (1972) – Police Chief
- Tiffany Jones (1973) – Marocek
- Professor Popper's Problem (1974) – Grainger
- The Vision (1988) – Lord Mallory

=== Television ===
- The Avengers - Mission to Montreal (1962) – Brand
- The Saint - The Death Penalty – Trape
- The Saint - The Golden Frog – Vargas
- Doctor Who - The War Machines (1966) – Major Green
- Morecambe and Wise (1969-1971) – Bank Manager / King Philip of Spain / Inspector Crump
- Up Pompeii in "The Peace Treaty" (1970) - Captain Bumptius
- On the Buses (TV series) in Episode 2 of Series 4, "The Canteen Girl") (1970) – Mr. Stewart
- Jason King - An Author in Search of Two Characters (1972) – Commissionaire
- Whoops Baghdad (1973) – Captain of the Guards / Havabanana / Sheikh Akabar the Vile / Robber

== Theatre appearances ==
- The Players' Theatre
- Peter Pan ... as Captain Hook
- Aladdin at the London Palladium as Abanazar
- Robinson Crusoe at the London Palladium as Will Atkins, the Pirate
- Babes in the Wood at the London Palladium as the Sheriff of Nottingham
