= Stanley Myers =

English composer and conductor (1930–1993)

Background information
- Born: 6 October 1930; Birmingham, Warwickshire, England
- Died: 9 November 1993 (aged 63) Kensington and Chelsea, London, England
- Genre: Film score
- Occupations: Composer, conductor
- Spouse: Eleanor Fazan

Stanley Myers (6 October 1930 – 9 November 1993) was an English composer and conductor, who scored over sixty films and television series, working closely with filmmakers Nicolas Roeg, Jerzy Skolimowski and Volker Schlöndorff. He is best known for his guitar piece "Cavatina", composed for the 1970 film The Walking Stick and later used as the theme for The Deer Hunter. He was nominated for a BAFTA Award for Best Film Music for Wish You Were Here (1987), and was an early collaborator with and mentor of Hans Zimmer.

== Biography ==
Myers was born in Birmingham, England; as a teenager he went to King Edward's School in Edgbaston, a suburb of Birmingham. He married choreographer Eleanor Fazan.

Myers wrote incidental music for television: for example, "The Reign of Terror", a 1964 serial in the television series Doctor Who; the theme to All Gas and Gaiters; and the theme for the BBC's Question Time.

One night in 1966, Myers and Barry Fantoni had called into the Chi Chi club to discuss the music for the movie Kaleidoscope which was to star Warren Beatty and Susannah York. What they were after was a switched-on song they needed for a switched-on intense movie. The resident group called Romeo Z came on and caused the ceiling to shake. There they knew they had the band they wanted, and they got the band to record the song "Kaleidoscope", which appeared in the film and on the soundtrack album which was released on Warner Bros. W 1663 in October 1966

He is known for composing music for the cult horror films House of Whipcord, Frightmare, House of Mortal Sin and Schizo for filmmaker Pete Walker.

The Pink Floyd website credits the brass parts on their 1968 song "Corporal Clegg" to "The Stanley Myers Orchestra".

Myers is best known for "Cavatina" (1970), an evocative guitar piece, played by John Williams, that served as the signature theme for Michael Cimino's 1978 film The Deer Hunter, and for which Myers won the Ivor Novello Award. A somewhat different version of this work, not performed by Williams, had appeared in The Walking Stick. And yet another version had lyrics added. Cleo Laine and Iris Williams, in separate recordings as "He Was Beautiful", helped to make "Cavatina" become even more popular.

During the 1980s, Myers worked frequently with director Stephen Frears. His score for Prick Up Your Ears (1987) won him a "Best Artistic Contribution" award at the Cannes Film Festival. He also scored the film Wish You Were Here and several low budget features (Time Traveller, Blind Date, The Wind, Zero Boys) for director Nico Mastorakis, collaborating with Hans Zimmer. He won another Ivor Novello Award for his soundtrack to The Witches in 1991.

Myers died of cancer aged 63 in Kensington and Chelsea, London.

== Filmography ==
=== Film ===
==== 1960s ====
Year	Title	Director	Notes
1966	Kaleidoscope	Jack Smight	
1967	Ulysses	Joseph Strick	
1967	Separation	Jack Bond	
1968	The Night of the Following Day	Hubert Cornfield	
1968	No Way to Treat a Lady	Jack Smight	Composed with Andrew Belling
1968	Otley	Dick Clement	
1969	Man on Horseback	Volker Schlöndorff	Composed with Peter Sandloff
1969	Two Gentlemen Sharing	Ted Kotcheff	
1969	Age of Consent	Michael Powell	Composed with Peter Sculthorpe

==== 1970s ====
Year	Title	Director	Notes
1970	Tropic of Cancer	Joseph Strick	
1970	The Walking Stick	Eric Till	
1970	Underground	Arthur H. Nadel	
1970	Take a Girl Like You	Jonathan Miller	
1970	Tam Lin	Roddy McDowall	
1970	A Severed Head	Dick Clement	
1971	The Raging Moon	Bryan Forbes	
1972	X Y & Zee	Brian G. Hutton	
1972	King, Queen, Knave	Jerzy Skolimowski	
1972	Sitting Target	Douglas Hickox	
1972	A Free Woman	Volker Schlöndorff	
1973	The Love Ban	Ralph Thomas	
1973	The Blockhouse	Clive Rees	
1973	Road Movie	Joseph Strick	
1974	House of Whipcord	Pete Walker	
1974	Frightmare	Pete Walker	
1974	Little Malcolm	Stuart Cooper	
1974	Caravan to Vaccarès	Geoffrey Reeve	
1974	The Apprenticeship of Duddy Kravitz	Ted Kotcheff	Composed with Andrew Powell
1975	The Wilby Conspiracy	Ralph Nelson	
1975	Conduct Unbecoming	Michael Anderson	
1976	Schizo	Pete Walker	
1976	House of Mortal Sin	Pete Walker	
1976	Coup de Grâce	Volker Schlöndorff	
1977	A Portrait of the Artist as a Young Man	Joseph Strick	
1978	The Greek Tycoon	J. Lee Thompson	
1978	The Comeback	Pete Walker	
1978	The Class of Miss MacMichael	Silvio Narizzano	
1978	The Deer Hunter	Michael Cimino	
1978	Absolution	Anthony Page	
1979	The Great Riviera Bank Robbery	Francis Megahy	
1979	Yesterday's Hero	Neil Leifer	
1979	A Nightingale Sang in Berkeley Square	Ralph Thomas	

==== 1980s ====
Year	Title	Director	Notes
1980	Border Cop	Christopher Leitch	
1980	The Watcher in the Woods	John Hough	
1981	Lady Chatterley's Lover	Just Jaeckin	Composed with Richard Harvey
1982	The Incubus	John Hough	
1982	Moonlighting	Jerzy Skolimowski	
1983	Eureka	Nicolas Roeg	
1983	The Honorary Consul	John Mackenzie	
1984	Success Is the Best Revenge	Jerzy Skolimowski	Composed with Hans Zimmer
1984	Story of O - Chapter 2	Éric Rochat	Composed with Hans Zimmer
1984	Blind Date	Nico Mastorakis	
1984	The Next One	Nico Mastorakis	
1984	The Chain	Jack Gold	
1985	The Lightship	Jerzy Skolimowski	
1985	Insignificance	Nicolas Roeg	Composed with Hans Zimmer
1985	My Beautiful Laundrette	Stephen Frears	Composed with Hans Zimmer
1985	Dreamchild	Gavin Millar	
1986	Castaway	Nicolas Roeg	
1986	The Zero Boys	Nico Mastorakis	Composed with Hans Zimmer
1986	Separate Vacations	Michael Anderson	Composed with Hans Zimmer
1986	The Wind	Nico Mastorakis	Composed with Hans Zimmer
1987	The Second Victory	Gerald Thomas	
1987	Nightmare at Noon	Nico Mastorakis	Composed with Hans Zimmer
1987	Wish You Were Here	David Leland	Nominated- BAFTA Award for Best Film Music
1987	Prick Up Your Ears	Stephen Frears	
1987	The Nature of the Beast	Franco Rosso	Composed with Hans Zimmer
1987	Sammy and Rosie Get Laid	Stephen Frears	
1988	Stars and Bars	Pat O'Connor	
1988	Track 29	Nicolas Roeg	
1988	Taffin	Francis Megahy	Composed with Hans Zimmer
1988	Paperhouse	Bernard Rose	Composed with Hans Zimmer
1988	The Boost	Harold Becker	
1989	Torrents of Spring	Jerzy Skolimowski	
1989	Scenes from the Class Struggle in Beverly Hills	Paul Bartel	

==== 1990s ====
Year	Title	Director	Notes
1990	Ladder of Swords	Norman Hull	
1990	The Witches	Nicolas Roeg	Nominated- Saturn Award for Best Music
1990	Rosencrantz & Guildenstern Are Dead	Tom Stoppard	
1991	Voyager	Volker Schlöndorff	
1991	Cold Heaven	Nicolas Roeg	
1992	Claude	Cindy Lou Johnson	
1992	Sarafina!	Darrell Roodt	Final film score

=== Television ===
Year	Title	Notes
1961	ITV Television Playhouse	Episode: "A Resounding Tinkle"
1964	Doctor Who	6 episodes "The Reign of Terror" serial
1964	Diary of a Young Man	6 episodes
1965–66	The Wednesday Play	6 episodes
1967	Four Tall Tinkles	4 episodes
1967	A Series of Bird's	6 episodes
1969	World in Ferment	6 episodes
1970	Charley's Grants	6 episodes
1967–71	All Gas and Gaiters	31 episodes
1973	Divorce His, Divorce Hers	Television film
1973–84	Play for Today	4 episodes
1974	Shoulder to Shoulder	Miniseries
1975	The Legend of Robin Hood	Miniseries
1978	Summer of My German Soldier	Television film
1980	The Martian Chronicles	Miniseries
1982	Nancy Astor	Miniseries
1982–83	Take Hart	35 episodes
1983	A Pattern of Roses	Television film
1983–85	Widows	7 episodes
1984	Diana	10 episodes
1984	The Zany Adventures of Robin Hood	Television film
1985	My Brother Jonathan	5 episodes
1985	Black Arrow	Television film
1985	Florence Nightingale	Television film
1985	Mr. and Mrs. Edgehill	Television film
1986	Strong Medicine	Television film
1986	Monte Carlo	Miniseries
1986	The Singing Detective	Miniseries
1986	Nature	Episode: "Pantanal: Prairie of Great Waters"
1986–93	Screen Two	6 episodes
1987	Scoop	Television film
1987	Pack of Lies	Television film
1987	Strong Medicine	Television film
1987	Harry's Kingdom	Television film
1987	A Wreath of Roses	Television film
1988	Stones for Ibarra	Television film
1988	Baja Oklahoma	Television film
1988	Tidy Endings	Television film
1988	Christabel	Miniseries
1989	The Play on One	Episode: "Heartland"
1989	Danny, the Champion of the World	Television film
1989	Screenplay	Episode: "A Small Mourning"
1989	Age-Old Friends	Television film
1990	Never Come Back	3 episodes
1991	A Murder of Quality	Television film
1992	My Friend Walter	Television film
1992	Mrs. 'Arris Goes to Paris	Television film
1993	Head over Heels	7 episodes
1993	Stalag Luft	Television film
1993	Heart of Darkness	Television film
1994	Middlemarch	Miniseries; Composed with Christopher Gunning BAFTA TV Award for Best Original Music in a Dramatic Programme
