= David McGillivray (screenwriter) =

British writer

- Born: 7 September 1947 (age 79); London, England, United Kingdom
- Occupations: Actor, film producer, writer

David McGillivray (born 7 September 1947 in London) is an actor, producer, playwright, screenwriter and film critic.

On the BBC Radio 3 discussion programme Free Thinking on 10 February 2015, writer and broadcaster Matthew Sweet described McGillivray as "The Truffaut of Smut", leading to McGillivray later commenting via his Twitter feed @makeadelivery, "I can die happy".

Originally a critic for Monthly Film Bulletin, McGillivray wrote his first film script, Albert's Follies, for friend Ray Selfe in 1973. Intended as a vehicle for The Goodies, who turned it down, the film was eventually released as White Cargo (1973) and starred a young David Jason in one of his earliest leading roles.

McGillivray was soon involved in the British sex film industry, writing scripts for The Hot Girls (1974) and I'm Not Feeling Myself Tonight (1976), two films produced by pornographer John Jesnor Lindsay. As would be the case with many of his films, McGillivray makes cameo appearances in both: in I’m Not Feeling Myself Tonight he is “Man at Party” who pulls Monika Ringwald’s dress off while in The Hot Girls he was given the job of doing an onscreen interview with Danish actress Helli Louise, who according to the synopsis in Cinema X magazine, talks to him about "working on a movie, and telling a few facts of life about screen nudity and enacting lesbian love scenes."

In 2006, he recorded a oral history interview, with Alan Dein, about his experiences of working and living in King's Cross.

== Horror ==
McGillivray gained attention with his scripts for the horror films of Norman J. Warren and especially Pete Walker. McGillivray wrote two scripts for Warren (Satan's Slave, Terror) and four for Walker (Frightmare, House of Whipcord, House of Mortal Sin, Schizo). The films were not commercially successful and McGillivray's scripts attracted mostly hostile reviews.

House of Whipcord did receive one or two positive reviews, with Films and Filming commenting: “Shows that something worthwhile in the entertainment-horror market can be done for the tiny sum of £60,000”. It was memorably dismissed by Russell Davies writing in British newspaper The Observer as a "feeble fladge fantasy” and described by the Evening News “as nasty an exploitation of sadism as I can recall in the cinema.”

Indeed, McGillivray's background as a critic for Monthly Film Bulletin and Time Out hardly excluded his writing efforts from the savage criticism of ex-colleagues. For example, a Films Illustrated review of I'm Not Feeling Myself Tonight lamented that "It is depressing to see David McGillivray writing scripts like this," while a Time Out review of Satan's Slave opens with: “Another absolute stinker from the withered pen of David McGillivray.”

In 1975, McGillivray was interviewed for an edition of the BBC programme Man Alive, dealing with sexploitation films, along with Walker, Bachoo Sen and Kent Walton. However, he later felt that he and his fellow contributors had presented a distorted view of the business, telling Screen International magazine in the same year "thrilled to bits that our opinions were held to be important enough for transmission we had all -may we be forgiven- said what the nations moral reformers wanted to hear i.e. that the films we made degraded us and that we were thoroughly miserable that the public didn't want to see anything more uplifting. This is not the case. I have never worked with anyone who found it unpleasant or distasteful to do a job which involved standing in close proximity to naked women.”

From 2004 he wrote and produced a series of short horror films, which were not particularly successful either on their own or when joined together as a portmanteau "Worst Fears", in which he also appeared as an actor. "Worst Fears" was shown at the Derby Film Festival in 2017 along with his short film Trouser Bar.

== Theatre and comedy ==
With the abolition of the Eady levy tax in the early 1980s spelling the end for low-budget British sex comedies and horror films, McGillivray moved into the theatre, co-writing lowbrow farces for his own company. Working in collaboration with Walter Zerlin Jnr, a series of 10 plays focused on The Farndale Avenue Housing Estate Townswomens Guild Dramatic Society spoofed local amateur dramatic productions. The plays are published by Samuel French Ltd and continue to be performed in front of astonished audiences.

During this period he also met the performer Julian Clary, who was then starting as a stand-up comic. McGillivray has continued to this day to write for Clary, but claims that his are the jokes that "don't get laughs". His work has included writing material for Clary when he presented the BBC TV quiz show Come and Have A Go... in 2005, directing and co-writing Clary's 2009 national UK tour "Lord of the Mince", and directing and co-writing Julian Clary's 2012–14 tour "Position Vacant, Apply Within".

As an actor, he appeared with Olegar Fedoro in a new production of the Russian Futurist opera "Victory Over the Sun" presented by the New Factory of the Eccentric Actor at Pushkin House, London in December 2008.

McGillivray financed and produced Trouser Bar, the award-winning 2016 British erotic comedy/fantasy film directed by Kristen Bjorn, photographed by Sam Hardy, edited by Esteban Requejo, and intended for a mainstream audience. Focusing on a single "situation" in a menswear boutique in 1976, the short film has been described as an “erotic fantasy" in the style of a 1970s British sex comedy and does not include hardcore scenes. Released in 2017, the film played film festivals around the world.

In 2023, McGillivray attended East London LGBTQ+ Film Festival and was presented with a lifetime achievement award.

== Books ==
In 1992 McGillivray wrote the book Doing Rude Things, which documented the British sex film genre from its nudist camp beginnings to its demise in the video-era. Pamela Green wrote the foreword. In it McGillivray admits to a fondness for "the second rate and the downright worthless".

A television version of his original Doing Rude Things book was produced by the BBC in 1995, in which he was interviewed along with the likes of Donovan Winter, and Pamela Green. McGillivray has subsequently appeared in several similar documentaries. He also edited Scapegoat (1995), a one-shot anti-censorship magazine produced during the second "video nasty" furore of the early 1990s.

A vastly expanded and updated 25th anniversary edition of this 'seminal history' of the British sex film was published in October 2017 by Wolfbait Books, an imprint of Korero Press. The new edition is twice as long as the original, with 150 additional film titles added. The launch took place at a central London venue close to the main locations of Michael Powell's notorious 1960 film Peeping Tom. McGillivray has said that the new edition appeared to a "lukewarm response".

His autobiography, Little Did You Know, was published by FAB Press in 2019.

== Filmography ==
As writer
Year	Film	Type
2011	Tincture of Vervain	Short
2007	We're Ready for You Now	Short
2006	In the Place of the Dead	Short
2006	I Wednesday	Short
2005	Mrs. Davenport's Throat	Short
1987	Turnaround (from material by)	
1981	De dame en de marskramer	
1980	The Errand	Short
1978	Terror	
1976	Satan's Slave	
1976	Schizo	
1976	House of Mortal Sin	
1976	I'm Not Feeling Myself Tonight	
1975	Excuse Me Madam	
1974	Frightmare	
1974	The Hot Girls	Short
1974	House of Whipcord	
1973	White Cargo	

As producer
Year	Film	Type
2016	Worst Fears	
2016	Trouser Bar	Short
2014	Peter De Rome: Grandfather of Gay Porn	Documentary
2012	Fragments: The Incomplete Films of Peter de Rome	Documentary short
2011	A Kiss from Grandma	Short
2011	Tincture of Vervain	Short
2010	Greensleeves	Short
2008	Abracadaver!	Short
2007	We're Ready for You Now	Short
2006	In the Place of the Dead	Short
2006	I Wednesday	Short
2005	Mrs. Davenport's Throat	Short
1980	The Errand	Short

As actor
Year	Film	Type	Role	Segment
2020	The Big Snooze Button	Short	Pe Op Man	
2019	III Pride	Short	David	
2016	Worst Fears		Undertaker	Segment 1 Tincture of Vervain
2016	Horror Icon	Short	Himself	
2013	Turn Your Bloody Phone Off: The Second Batch	Short	Impolite Phone Man	Norman J. Warren & The Ghost
2011	Tincture of Vervain	Short	Undertaker	
2011	Unhappy Birthday		Pub Landlord	
2008	Abracadaver!	Short	Audience Member (uncredited)	
2006	In the Place of the Dead	Short	Englishman	
2006	The Adventures of George the Projectionist		TV Reporter	
2004	The Quiet Storm		Hans Zimmer	
1979	Can I Come Too?	Short	Critic	
1978	Terror		T.V. Reporter (as David Mc.Gillivray)	
1976	Satan's Slave		Priest	
1976	I'm Not Feeling Myself Tonight		Party Guests (uncredited)	
1974	Frightmare		Doctor (uncredited)	
1974	The Hot Girls	Short	Interviewer	
1974	House of Whipcord		Caven (uncredited)	
1973	White Cargo		Customer	

== Sources ==
- Sheridan, Simon (2007). Keeping the British End Up: Four Decades of Saucy Cinema (3rd ed.). Reynolds & Hearn Books. ISBN 9781903111215.
- McGillivray, David (2017). Doing Rude Things: The History of the British Sex Film. Wolfbait Books. ISBN 9781999744151.
- "The Hot Girls". Cinema X. Vol. 6, no. 7. 1975.
- Jones, Alex (1997). Nekrofile: Cinema of the Extreme. Midnight Media publishing. (contains the 1975 Screen International quotes)
