= Sheila Keith =

British actress (1920–2004)

- in The Saint, 1967
- Born: 9 June 1920; London, England
- Died: 14 October 2004 (aged 84); Chertsey, Surrey, England
- Education: Webber Douglas Academy of Dramatic Art
- Occupation: Actress

Sheila Keith (9 June 1920 – 14 October 2004) was a Scottish stage and screen actress. She is well-known to horror film fans for her collaborations with director Pete Walker, starring in House of Whipcord, Frightmare, House of Mortal Sin, The Comeback and House of the Long Shadows. She was once referred to as the "Female Boris Karloff" and a "British horror icon."

== Early life ==
Keith was born to Scottish parents in London while they were visiting the city and brought up in Aberdeen, Scotland. Longing to act, she trained at the Webber Douglas Academy of Dramatic Art in London.

== Career ==
Her stage career took her from repertory theatre at the Bristol Old Vic and Pitlochry, to West End appearances including Noël Coward's Present Laughter, Mame with Ginger Rogers, An Italian Straw Hat, Anyone for Denis?, and Deathtrap.

The Scotsman wrote: "In the Sixties, she was often seen in series such as The Saint, Public Eye and Sherlock Holmes. But she gained a national popularity when she went into Crossroads in 1967 as Mrs Cornet. It was the era when the soap was hugely popular and Noelle Gordon ruled the motel with a rod of iron...She played Lady Rosina in the BBC’s mammoth production of The Pallisers, Aunt Morag (keen on her whisky) in Hinge and Bracket's TV series Dear Ladies, Auntie Ethel in Moody and Pegg. She was also seen in the first run of Dr Finlay's Casebook.". Also, too, the Housekeeper, Mrs. Mitcham, in the Lord Peter Wimsey (TV series), The Unpleasantness at the Bellona Club episode, 1973.

Keith remains best known for her excellent performances in the cult horror films of director Pete Walker, having played leading roles in shockers such as House of Whipcord, Frightmare, House of Mortal Sin, The Comeback and House of the Long Shadows. She played variously, a lesbian prison warder, a one eyed housekeeper, and an elderly cannibal, amongst other parts.

In her obituary, The Times described her as an "Actress of film, stage and television who became a 'British horror icon' ...It was with her portrayal of sinister, sadistic and deranged women in the horror movies of the director Pete Walker that she acquired her most devoted following".

Sheila Keith also had a memorable role as the Abbess Reverend Mother Stephen opposite Arthur Lowe, in all three series of the LWT sitcom Bless Me, Father.

Her final role was in the first episode of a horror spoof TV series, Dr. Terrible's House of Horrible, starring Steve Coogan, in 2001.

== Death ==
Keith died in Chertsey, Surrey in October 2004, at the age of 84.

== Filmography ==
=== Film ===
Year	Title	Role	Type
1969	It All Goes to Show	Councillor Mrs. Parker	Short film
1972	Ooh... You Are Awful	Lady Magistrate	Feature film
1974	House of Whipcord	Walker	Feature film
1974	Frightmare	Dorothy Yates	Feature film
1976	House of Mortal Sin	Miss Brabazon	Feature film
1978	The Comeback	Mrs. B	Feature film
1982	The Return of the Soldier	Sister	Feature film
1983	House of the Long Shadows	Victoria Grisbane	Feature film
1986	Clockwise	Pat's Mother	Feature film
1989	Venus Peter	Epp	Feature film
1989	Wild Flowers	Marguerite	TV movie
1990	The Rainbow Thief	Bernadette	Feature film

== Television ==
Year	Title	Role	Type
1961	Comedy Matinee		Miniseries, episode 2: "Thark"
1964	Crane	Mrs Ambrose	TV series, season 2, episode 3: "Dead Reckoning"
1964	Armchair Mystery Theatre	Miss Tripp	TV series, season 2, episode 2: "The Blackmailiing of Mr S"
1965	Sherlock Holmes	Miss Stoper	TV series, season 1, episode 3: "The Copper Beaches"The Adventure of the Copper Beeches
1965	The Sullavan Brothers	Miss Diamond	TV series, season 2, episode 6: "The Salvation Man"
1966	Love Story	Mrs Black	TV series, season 4, episode 4: "Casanova and the Old Crow"
1965; 1966	Public Eye	Mrs Wyncherley / Susan Manning	TV series, 2 episodes
1967	ITV Play of the Week	Miss Erikson	TV series, season 12, episode 26: "Present Laughter"
1967	Crossroads	Mrs Cornet	TV series, 31 episodes
1967	Mrs Thursday	Gertrude Tallifer / Honor	TV series, 3 episodes
1968	Dr. Finlay’s Casebook	Miss Talbot	TV series, season 6, episode 15: "A Moral Problem"
1968	Nicholas Nickleby	Mrs Squeers	Miniseries, 2 episodes
1968	The Ronnie Barker Playhouse	Mrs Granville	TV series, season 1, episode 3: "The Fastest Gun in Finchley"
1968	ITV Playhouse	Marion	TV series, season 2, episode 9: "The Kindness of Mrs Radcliffe"
1968	The Saint	Cynthia Ffouldes	TV series, season 6, episode 3: "Legacy for the Saint"
1968	George and the Dragon	Dr Martin	TV series, season 4, episode 4: "Life Insurance"
1970	Me Mammy	Hotel Manageress	TV series, season 2, episode 4: "The Last of the Red Hot Mammies"
1970	Rules, Rules, Rules	Troupe #2	TV series, season 1, episode 3: "Conventions and Customs"
1970	Play for Today	Una	TV series, season 1, episode 8: "Hearts and Flowers"
1971	Kate	Miss Shaw	TV series, season 2, episode 13: "The Great Female Rebellion"
1971; 1973	The Flaxton Boys	Chief Officer Juliet Mincing-Sterne / Lady Agatha Ponsonby	
1972	The Moonstone	Mrs Yolland	TV series, season 1, episode 2
1972	Z-Cars	Mrs Jenkins	TV series, season 7, episode 51: "Quilley"
1972	It's Murder But Is It Art	Mrs MacPherson	TV series, season 1, 5 episodes
1973	The Unpleasantness at the Bellona Club	Mrs Mitcham	Miniseries, episode 3: "That Damned Dorland Woman"
1973	The Regiment	Miss Hagan	TV series, season 2, episode 9: "Women"
1974	The Liver Birds	Sister	TV series, season 4, episode 20: "Follow That Ring"
1974	The Pallisers	Lady Rosina de Courcy	Miniseries, episode 21
1974	Father Brown	Mrs Sands	TV series, season 1, episode 8: "The Actor and the Alibi"
1974–75	David Copperfield	Mrs Steerforth	Miniseries, 4 episodes
1974–75	Moody and Pegg	Auntie Ethel	TV series, 5 episodes
1975	Ballet Shoes	Dr Jake's	Miniseries, 6 episodes
1975	The Doll	Mrs. Cassidy	TV series, 3 episodes
1975	Within These Walls	Lettice Nayland	TV series, season 3, episode 14: "Inside Out"
1976	Angels	Joan White	TV series, season 2, episode 2: "Vocation"
1976	Murder	Mrs Cleary	TV series, season 1, episode 2: "Nobody's Conscience"
1977	The Cedar Tree	Gwenneth Abercrombie	TV series, season 2, episode 2: "Party Manners: Part 2"
1977	The Velvet Glove	Pamela Leonard	TV series, season 1, episode 3: "Mother"
1977	Jubilee	Mother	TV series, season 1, episode 7: "Our Kid"
1977	Sea Tales: The Return	Mrs Varley	Miniseries, season 4: "Captain Varley Goes Home"
1977	A Roof Over My Head	Mrs Bagworth	TV series, 3 episodes
1978	Some Mothers Do ‘Ave ‘Em	Sister	TV series, season 3, episode 2: "Wendy House"
1978	Bernie		TV series, season 1, episode 6
1979	Rings on Their Fingers	The Neighbour	TV series, season 2, episode 6: "Mother's Old, Pastures New"
1979	The Dick Francis Thriller: The Racing Game	Mrs Kite	TV series, season 1, episode 5: "Horsenap"
1980	Heartland	Grace	TV series, season 2, episode 5: "Working Arrangements"
1980	Cribb	Miss Plummer	TV series, season 1, episode 2: "Swing, Swing Together"
1980	The Other 'Arf	Mrs Lilley	TV series
1980	Escape	Dowager Lady Lucan	TV series, season 1, episode 1: "Lord Lucan"
1979; 1981	Agony	Emily Bakewell	TV series, 2 episodes
1978; 1979; 1981	Bless Me, Father	Reverend Mother Stephen	TV series, seasons 1–3, 8 episodes
1982	Frost in May	Aunt Leah	Miniseries, 2 episodes
1983	All For Love	Mrs Bannerman	TV series, season 2, episode 5: "Fireworks for Elspeth"
1984	Poor Little Rich Girls	Maude Wellington	TV series, season 1, episode 4: "Lonely as a Crowd"
1984	Dear Ladies	Aunt Morag	TV series, season 3, episode 2: "Where There's a Will"
1985	Mog	Magistrate	TV series, season 1, episode 1: "A Suitable Case for Treatment"
1986	Lovejoy	Curator	TV series, season 1, episode 4: "Friends, Romans and Enemies"
1986	Hell’s Bells	Country Woman	Miniseries, episode 1: "On Your Bike, Pilgrim!"
1986	Fresh Fields	Hotelier	TV series, season 4, episode 4: "Life is Full of Ups and Downs"
1987	Never the Twain	Lady Mottram	TV series, season 6, episode 3: "Love Is a Many-Splendoured Thing"
1985–87	Drummonds	Dorothy Fisher	TV series, 17 episodes
1988	All in Good Faith	Mrs Davidson	TV series, season 3, episode 2: "And He Fell Among Thieves"
1988	Sophia and Constance	Aunt Harriet	TV series, season 1, episode 2
1989	A Fine Romance	Miss Roy	TV series, season 1, episode 5: "Below Suspicion"
1989	The Paradise Club	Clara Malone / Ma Kane	TV series, 3 episodes
1990	After Henry	Lady Newby	RV series, season 3, episode 4: "Relative Movement"
1992	Tell Tale Hearts	Sylvia	Miniseries
1993	Health and Efficiency	Rex's Patient	TV series, season 1, episode 1: "But He Never Said He Loved Me"
1994	Love Hurts	Lady Oonagh Oppenheim	TV series, season 3, episode 10: "Cards on the Table"
1994	The Brittas Empire	Mrs Heaton-Jones	TV series, season 5, episode 5: "The Boss"
1995	Doctor Finlay	Mrs Annie Renfrew	TV series, season 3, episode 5: "A Natural Mistake"
1996	Hamish Macbeth	Aunt Ella	TV series, season 2, 2 episodes
2001	Dr. Terrible's House of Horrible	Grandma Lee	TV series, episode 1: "And Now the Fearing" (final role)
