= For Men Only =

For Men Only may refer to:

- For Men Only (magazine), American men's magazine
- For Men Only (1938 film), Italian comedy film
- For Men Only (1952 film), American drama film
- For Men Only (1960 film), Spanish historical comedy film
- For Men Only (1964 film), Egyptian romantic comedy film
- For Men Only (1967 film), also known as I Like Birds, British independent film
