= Anthony Sharp =

British actor (1915–1984)

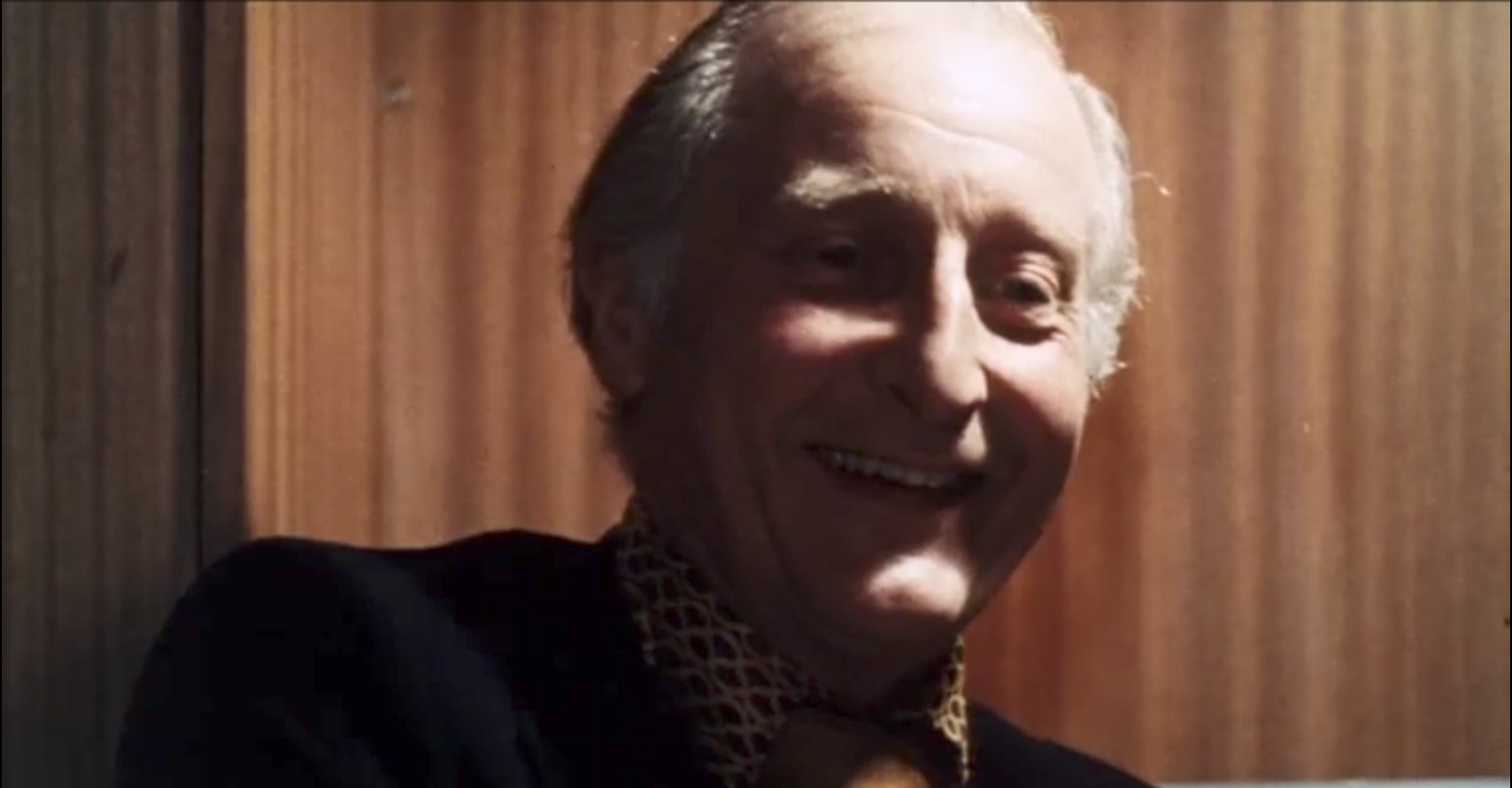
- Sharp in A Clockwork Orange (1971)
- Born: Dennis Anthony John Sharp; 16 June 1915; Highgate, County of London, England, UK
- Died: 23 July 1984 (aged 69); London, England, UK
- Education: London Academy of Music and Dramatic Art
- Occupations: Actor, writer, director
- Years active: 1938-1984
- Spouse: Margaret Wedlake (m. 1953)
- Children: 4

Dennis Anthony John Sharp (16 June 1915 – 23 July 1984) was an English actor, writer and director.

== Stage career ==
Anthony Sharp was a graduate of the London Academy of Music and Dramatic Art (LAMDA) and made his stage debut in February 1938 with HV Neilson's Shakespearean touring company, playing the Sergeant in Macbeth at the De La Warr Pavilion, Bexhill-on-Sea. Repertory engagements in Wigan, Hastings, Peterborough and Liverpool were followed by war service, after which he resumed his stage career at the Mercury Theatre, Notting Hill Gate in September 1946, playing Hansell in Tangent.

He first appeared in the West End in Family Portrait at the Strand Theatre in February 1948. Among his many subsequent appearances were Cry Liberty (Vaudeville Theatre 1950), Who Goes There! (Vaudeville Theatre 1951), For Better, For Worse (Comedy Theatre 1952), Small Hotel (St Martin's Theatre 1955), No Time for Sergeants (Her Majesty's Theatre 1956), The Edwardians (Saville Theatre 1959), She's Done It Again (Garrick Theatre 1969), The Avengers (Prince of Wales Theatre 1971) and Number One (Queen's Theatre 1984).

Other London credits included The Rivals (Sadler's Wells 1972), She Stoops to Conquer (Lyric Hammersmith 1982) and several appearances at the Open Air Theatre Regent's Park. There he played Benedick in Much Ado About Nothing in 1958 and Malvolio in Twelfth Night the following year. Rejoining the company in the 1970s, he appeared in such plays as Love's Labour's Lost and The Man of Destiny prior to reprising his Malvolio in 1979.

== Writer and director ==
Sharp was also a playwright. His stage version of the Thomas Love Peacock novel Nightmare Abbey was a big hit at the Westminster Theatre in 1952, opening there on 27 February. "Anthony Sharp's altogether delightful adaptation provided one of the most unusual as well as most amusing offerings of the season," commented Theatre World editor Frances Stephens. After a try-out in Sheffield in October 1954, the historical drama The Conscience of the King was remounted at the Theatre Royal Windsor in March 1955; in the second production Sharp himself played 17th century parliamentarian John Hampden. A third play, Tale of a Summer's Day, was written in 1959.

In addition, Sharp was a prolific director, particularly of comedy-thrillers and 'boardroom' dramas. His credits included Any Other Business (Westminster Theatre 1958), Caught Napping (Piccadilly Theatre 1959), Wolf's Clothing (Strand Theatre 1959), Billy Bunter Flies East (Victoria Palace 1959), The Gazebo (Savoy Theatre 1960), Guilty Party (St Martin's Theatre 1961), Critic's Choice (Vaudeville Theatre 1961), Act of Violence (1962 UK tour), Devil May Care (Strand Theatre 1963), Difference of Opinion (Garrick Theatre 1963), Hostile Witness (Haymarket Theatre 1964), Wait Until Dark (Strand Theatre 1966), Justice is a Woman (Vaudeville Theatre 1966) and Harvey (1970 UK tour). He also directed several productions in Hong Kong and Australia. He directed Present Laughter and Private Lives for Harry M Miller Attractions at the Palace Theatre Castlereagh Street, Sydney.

== Cinema, television and radio ==
=== Cinema ===
Sharp was frequently cast as supercilious professional or aristocratic types, notably in the Stanley Kubrick films A Clockwork Orange (as Minister of the Interior) and Barry Lyndon (as Lord Hallam). Other film credits include Cornel Wilde's No Blade of Grass, two for Michael Winner (The Jokers and I'll Never Forget What's'isname), Russ Meyer's Black Snake and the Disney film One of Our Dinosaurs is Missing. His only starring role in a feature film was the homicidal priest Father Xavier Meldrum in Pete Walker's 1975 horror picture House of Mortal Sin.

His final feature film, in which he played foreign secretary Lord Ambrose, was the James Bond picture Never Say Never Again, released in 1983.

=== Television ===
In 1977 he had a leading role in the children's television series The Flockton Flyer. Other TV dramas in which he appeared included Angel Pavement, The Plane Makers, Doomwatch, The Rivals of Sherlock Holmes, Crown Court, Upstairs, Downstairs, Schalcken the Painter and The Life and Times of David Lloyd George. He also played numerous cameo parts in sitcoms, notably Dad's Army (1969, 1977), Steptoe and Son (three episodes, 1970–74), Nearest and Dearest (1973), Man About the House (1975), Rising Damp (1975), George and Mildred (1976, 1978), Wodehouse Playhouse, (1978), and To the Manor Born (eight episodes, 1979–81). He worked frequently with such TV comedians as Benny Hill, Morecambe and Wise, Frankie Howerd and Bernie Winters, and towards the end of his life appeared in the early-1980s alternative comedy programmes The Young Ones and The Comic Strip.

=== Radio ===
In 1974, he appeared as the vicar in the radio version of Steptoe and Son, and in 1978 he was both Garkbit, the waiter in the Restaurant at the End of the Universe, and The Great Prophet Zarquon in Fit the Fifth of the original radio series of The Hitchhiker's Guide to the Galaxy. In 1981, he appeared as town clerk of the fictional Frambourne Town Council in the pilot episode of It Sticks Out Half a Mile, the radio sequel to Dad's Army, and in 1982–84 he was a regular as Major Dyrenforth in the Radio 2 series The Random Jottings of Hinge and Bracket, his last few episodes being broadcast posthumously.

== Personal life ==
He was born Dennis Anthony John Sharp in Highgate in 1915 and was an insurance policy draughtsman before training as an actor. From 1940 to 1946 he served with the Royal Corps of Signals and the Royal Artillery in North Africa, Italy and Austria. "Once the war was over," he recalled, "I wangled a transfer to the Army Broadcasting Service and helped run radio stations at Naples and Rome. These were very full and very pleasant days—announcing, script-writing, disc-jockeying, organising programmes, producing, acting." He married the actress Margaret Wedlake in July 1953; their son, Jonathan, was born in 1954. In Who's Who in the Theatre he listed his favourite part as Malvolio and his recreations as church architecture and watching cricket. He died of natural causes aged 69 in his native London; at the time of his death he was playing the Doctor in the West End production of Jean Anouilh's Number One at the Queen's Theatre.

== Selected filmography ==
- Conspiracy in Tehran (1946)
- The Sword and the Rose (1953) – French Diplomat
- You Know What Sailors Are (1954) – Humphrey – Naval Attache (uncredited)
- Wicked as They Come (1956)
- The Man Who Wouldn't Talk (1958) – Baker
- Left Right and Centre (1959) – Peteron
- Clue of the Silver Key (1961) – Mike Hennessey
- Invasion (1965) – Lawrence Blackburn
- Doctor in Clover (1966) – Dr. Dean Loftus
- Martin Soldat (1966) – Le major
- The Jokers (1967) – Prosecuting Lawyer (uncredited)
- I'll Never Forget What's'isname (1967) – Mr. Hamper Down (uncredited)
- Hot Millions (1968) – Hollis (uncredited)
- Crossplot (1969) – Vicar
- Doctor in Trouble (1970) – Chief Surgeon
- No Blade of Grass (1970) – Sir Charles Brenner
- Die Screaming, Marianne (1971) – Registrar
- A Clockwork Orange (1971) – Minister Frederick
- I Want What I Want (1972) – Mr. Parkhurst
- Some Kind of Hero (1972) – Barrister
- Black Snake (1973) – Lord Clive
- Gawain and the Green Knight (1973) – King
- Mistress Pamela (1974) – Longman
- Percy's Progress (1974) – Judge
- The Amorous Milkman (1975) – Counsel
- One of Our Dinosaurs Is Missing (1975) – Home Secretary
- Barry Lyndon (1975) – Lord Hallam
- House of Mortal Sin (1976) – Father Xavier Meldrum
- Crossed Swords (1977) – Dr. Buttes
- Abortar en Londres (1977) – Dr. Brown
- Schalcken the Painter (1979, TV Movie) – Gentleman
- Never Say Never Again (1983) – Lord Ambrose
