= Victor Winding =

British actor (1929–2014)

- Born: 30 January 1929; Lambeth, London
- Died: 9 October 2014 (aged 85); Pontypool, Wales
- Occupation: Actor
- Children: 4

Victor Winding (30 January 1929 – 9 October 2014) was a British actor born in Lambeth, London. Among his best-known roles was Spencer, an airline pilot taken over by a chameleon in the 1967 Doctor Who serial The Faceless Ones. He also appeared, from 1968 to 1971, as Det Chief Inspector Fleming in seasons one to three of the TV series The Expert. In addition, he enjoyed a long stint in the daytime soap Crossroads, playing garage manager Victor Lee from 1978 to 1981.

== Biography ==
Educated at Westminster Technical Institute, Winding initially trained as a draughtsman but acted in amateur dramatics, also teaching drama for the London County Council. In December 1958, aged 29, he turned professional on joining Farnham Repertory Company at the Castle Theatre in Farnham, Surrey. Three years later, in 1961, he joined the Old Vic company in London.

Aged 34, in February 1963, Winding made his West End debut in the James Saunders play Next Time I'll Sing to You at London's Criterion Theatre, taking over the role of Meff from Michael Caine, who had left the cast in order to make the film Zulu. Also in the play were Barry Foster, Liz Fraser and Peter McEnery. Winding's next West End role, from November 1963 to July 1964, was the Jesuit father in Jean Anouilh's Poor Bitos at the Duke of York's Theatre, with Donald Pleasence in the title role.

His film appearances included roles in three Pete Walker horror movies, namely Frightmare (1974), House of Mortal Sin (1975) and Schizo (1976). Other films included The System (1964), The Medusa Touch (1978) and The Sailor's Return (also 1978), in which he played the ship's captain.

He made numerous TV appearances, notably in The Flaxton Boys, playing Barnaby Sweet in the series set in 1890 (broadcast in 1970) and Benjamin Sweet in the two remaining series, set in 1928 and 1945 (broadcast 1971-73). He also played the Marquis St Evrémonde in the BBC's 1965 serialisation of A Tale of Two Cities and from 1968 to 1971 was series regular Det Chief Inspector Fleming in The Expert, playing alongside the show's star, Marius Goring. His other TV roles included Emergency Ward 10 (as series regular Dr Fairfax in 1965), The Saint, Warship, Bognor, Jemima Shore Investigates, Angels, Shelley, Yes, Prime Minister, Menace Unseen, The Bill and Telly Addicts. In addition, he played Victor Lee in Crossroads from 1978 to 1981.

In 1991, at the Duchess Theatre, he joined the cast of the Ray Cooney farce Run for Your Wife in its final year in the West End. Among his last television credits was the role of Kenneth Pigot in the ITV series Crime Story.

Winding was divorced from Rosalind Allen and had four children: Celia, Kay, Julian and Jane.

== Filmography ==
Year	Title	Role	Notes
1964	The System	Stan	Uncredited
1967	You Only Live Twice	Submarine Officer	Uncredited
1974	Frightmare	Detective Inspector	
1975	House of Mortal Sin	Dr Gaudio	
1976	Schizo	Sergeant	
1978	The Medusa Touch	Senior Police Officer	
1978	The Sailor's Return	Ship's Captain	
