= Jane Hayward =

Jane Hayward may refer to:

- Jane Hayward (Glee), a character in the musical comedy-drama television series Glee
- Jane Hayward (actress), British actress
