= Pearl Hackney =

British actress (1916–2009)

Pearl Hackney

Pearl Hackney (28 October 1916 – 18 September 2009) was a British actress. She was born in Burton upon Trent, Staffordshire, but spent much of her early life in Liverpool, Lancashire (now Merseyside).

Hackney was the wife of comic actor Eric Barker, with whom she had a daughter, actress Petronella Barker. Her granddaughter is Abigail Rhiannedd Hopkins, born 1968.

As well as appearing with her husband in a number of productions, including 21 episodes of The Eric Barker Half-Hour her television credits also include Coronation Street, Are You Being Served? (as Mrs. Grainger, wife of Mr. Ernest Grainger, in one episode, "The Clock", 1974), The Famous Five and All Creatures Great and Small. She also appeared in various radio episodes of Dad's Army.

Her film appearances included Stand Up, Virgin Soldiers (1977), Yanks (1979), The Ploughman's Lunch (1983), and four films for British director Pete Walker: Cool It Carol! (1970), Four Dimensions of Greta (1972), Tiffany Jones (1973), and Schizo (1976).

Her stage appearances included the principal role of Parthy in a revival of the musical Show Boat at London's Adelphi Theatre in 1971.

Hackney with her husband, actor Eric Barker, in 1946

She died in Herne Bay, Kent, on 18 September 2009, aged 92.

== Filmography ==
Year	Title	Role	Notes
1970	Cool It Carol!	Mrs. Thatcher / Carol's Mother	
1970	There's a Girl in My Soup	Wedding Guest	Uncredited
1972	Four Dimensions of Greta	Mrs. Gruber	
1973	Tiffany Jones	Demonstrating Woman	
1976	Schizo	Lady at Seance	
1977	Stand Up, Virgin Soldiers	Miss Burns	
1978	The Hound of the Baskervilles	Rail Passenger	
1979	Yanks	Aunt Maud	
1983	The Ploughman's Lunch	Mrs. Penfield	
1984	Laughterhouse	Pub Landlady	
