= House of Mortal Sin =

1976 British film by Pete Walker

- Original release advert
- Directed by: Pete Walker
- Written by: David McGillivray
- Story by: Pete Walker
- Produced by: Pete Walker
- Starring: Anthony Sharp; Susan Penhaligon; Stephanie Beacham; Norman Eshley; Sheila Keith
- Cinematography: Peter Jessop
- Edited by: John Black
- Music by: Stanley Myers
- Production company: Pete Walker (Heritage)
- Distributed by: Columbia Pictures
- Release date: February 1976 (UK)
- Running time: 104 minutes
- Country: United Kingdom
- Language: English

House of Mortal Sin (also known as The Confessional, The Confessional Death's Door and The Confessional Murders) is a 1976 British horror slasher film directed and produced by Pete Walker. It was scripted by David McGillivray from a story by Walker. Its plot concerns Father Xavier Meldrum, a deranged priest who takes it upon himself to punish his parishioners for their moral transgressions.

== Plot ==
Hearing that her friend Bernard Cutler has become a Catholic priest, Jenny Welch attends church to seek him out but finds that the man taking confession is not Bernard, but the elderly Father Xavier Meldrum. She quickly leaves, but not before telling Meldrum that her on-off boyfriend Terry Wyatt recently pressured her into having an abortion. Outwardly a kind-hearted counsellor of troubled youth, Meldrum is in fact a fervent believer in "divine justice" who freely resorts to emotional abuse in his obsessive efforts to redeem those he views as sinners. That night, while Jenny is out, Meldrum gains entry to her flat and assaults her friend Robert, believing him to be Terry. The unconscious Robert is taken to hospital.

The next day, Meldrum invites Jenny over to his presbytery, which he shares with his frail, bed-bound mother and his housekeeper, Miss Brabazon. During the meeting, Jenny is shocked to discover that Meldrum taped her confession to blackmail her. When she tells Terry of Meldrum's actions, Terry tracks Meldrum down and threatens him, but Meldrum bludgeons Terry to death with an incense burner and buries him in a freshly dug grave in the churchyard. Later, he quietly murders Robert in hospital.

At first refusing to believe Jenny's claims about Meldrum, Jenny's sister Vanessa learns the truth when she answers a threatening phone call from the priest on Jenny's behalf. She goes to the presbytery and encounters Mrs Meldrum, who knows that her son is mad and begs Vanessa to help. Meldrum arrives, strangles Vanessa, and at Brabazon's urging, murders his mother on the pretext of a mercy killing. Brabazon consoles Meldrum and says that she has always loved him, even though his mother forced him to call off their wedding and embrace a life of celibacy by entering the church. The pair make a suicide pact so that they can be together for ever, but after Brabazon fatally stabs herself, Meldrum hesitates. Bernard discovers the bodies of Terry and Vanessa and confronts Meldrum, who claims that Brabazon committed the murders out of love for him. He persuades Bernard to help him cover up the crimes for the good of the church. After Bernard leaves, Meldrum silent-calls Jenny to check that she is at home, then puts on a cloak and steps out into the night.

== Cast ==
- Anthony Sharp as Father Xavier Meldrum
- Susan Penhaligon as Jenny Welch
- Stephanie Beacham as Vanessa Welch
- Norman Eshley as Father Bernard Cutler
- Sheila Keith as Miss Brabazon
- Mervyn Johns as Father Duggan
- Hilda Barry as Mrs. Meldrum
- Stewart Bevan as Terry Wyatt
- Julia McCarthy as Mrs. Davey
- Jon Yule as Robert
- Bill Kerr as Mr. Davey
- Victor Winding as Dr. Gaudio
- Jack Allen as G.P.
- Kim Butcher as Valerie Davey
- Ivor Salter as gravedigger
- Andrew Sachs as man in church
- Jane Hayward as Nurse Fowler

== Production ==
=== Casting ===
Originally Peter Cushing was offered to play Father Xavier Meldrum and at the time there were some rumors that Cushing hated the script. In 1983, when Cushing acted in Walker's final film, House of the Long Shadows, Walker learned that Cushing actually liked the script, but had other film commitments. Harry Andrews and Stewart Granger were also considered to play Father Meldrum.

=== Filming ===
The film was shot over a period of five weeks in Berkshire and London, England.

== Critical reception ==
- "McGillivray’s script is full of inventive ideas which were obviously meant to shock and stir up controversy. Having the villainous murderer a repressed and crazed Catholic priest in modern times brought a new and different kind of monster to the catalog of British horror, and he’s marvelously played by Anthony Sharp. A lapsed Catholic in real life, Walker uses the film as a comment on organized religion, as extreme and satirical as it may be…” ~ George R. Reis, DVD Drive-In
- "Much criticism has been leveled against this film for its unabashed attacks on Catholicism, but it's really Walker's trademark amoral approach to filmmaking that elicits a strong urge to take a hot bath after viewing." ~ Cavett Binion, AllMovie
- "A disappointment, although it has its moments...The script relies too much on mild sacrilege for its effects, instead of concentrating on more interesting aspects of religious repression." ~ Time Out
- "I ended up being quite impressed with this one; it's one of those horror movies that tries to be about something more than just scaring people." ~ Dave Sindelar, Fantastic Movie Musings & Ramblings
- "The way the creepier, suffocating aspects of religion are brought out is bold and effective. As a whole, it's a callous, low budget and grey-toned work, but stays with the viewer longer than slicker horrors then or since." ~ Graeme Clark, The Spinning Image
- "Well-executed and maintains a dark interest throughout, supported by interesting performances (especially Sheila Keith as Meldrum's devoted love)." ~ The Terror Trap
- "Walker fails to bring any sensibility, other than the merely exploitative, to the grotesque material, this must be considered pretty irredeemable stuff, even for a horror film." ~ TV Guide
- "There are more pros than con with House of Mortal Sin, but Walker feels constipated with this effort, unsure if he wants to court controversy or make a cracking chiller." ~ Brian Orndorf, Blu-Ray.com
- "A hugely underrated shocker from cult director Pete Walker, who alone saved the British cinema of the 1970s from complete terror blandness with a series of Home County horrors that included House of Whipcord and Frightmare. Anthony Sharp gives an extraordinary performance...A serious look at the theme of a respectable public person using their position to pass judgement on those they see as corrupt, done with elegance, wit and purposely indignant bad taste." ~ Alan Jones, Radio Times
