= The Comeback (1978 film) =

1978 British film by Pete Walker

- Theatrical poster
- Directed by: Pete Walker
- Written by: Michael Sloan; Murray Smith
- Produced by: Pete Walker
- Starring: Jack Jones; Pamela Stephenson; David Doyle; Bill Owen; Sheila Keith; Richard Johnson
- Cinematography: Peter Jessop
- Edited by: Alan Brett
- Music by: Stanley Myers
- Production company: Pete Walker (Heritage)
- Distributed by: Enterprise Pictures (United Kingdom); Lone Star Pictures (United States)
- Release date: 16 June 1978
- Running time: 100 minutes
- Country: United Kingdom
- Language: English

The Comeback (also known as The Day the Screaming Stopped or Encore) is a 1978 British psychological horror slasher film directed and produced by Pete Walker and starring Jack Jones, Pamela Stephenson, and David Doyle. Its plot follows Nick Cooper, a successful but dormant American singer who retreats to a remote manor in Surrey to record an album; there, he is followed by a psychopath—donning a hag mask—who murdered his ex-wife Gail.

== Plot ==
Gail Cooper travels to her ex-husband Nick's apartment in London in order to remove some of its more valuable items. It soon becomes apparent that while Nick (a successful singer) isn't at home, someone is clearly there. The anonymous person watches Gail take a phone call from a reporter asking about the couple's divorce and inquiring as to when Nick will release his next album, as he's been on a six-year hiatus since marrying Gail. Just as Gail is about to leave, she is attacked by a killer wearing a hag mask and a lace shawl, who hacks her to death with a sickle.

Meanwhile, Nick arrives in London from New York, where he is attempting to record a new album to satisfy his manager Webster Jones. Nick finds some solace in Webster's secretary Linda Everett, with whom he shares a strong mutual attraction. After some debate, Nick moves into a manor in the Surrey countryside that is overseen by the housekeeper Mrs. Doris B and the gardener Mr. Albert B. Soon after his arrival Nick begins to experience strange phenomena that include visions of his ex-wife Gail. Nick is unaware of Gail's death, so he's confused by her appearance at the manor. Despite this, Nick begins to work on his album and further develop his romance with Linda. His psychological state is not helped when his associate Harry Cunningham goes missing and Nick discovers that Linda was formerly dating Webster. One night Nick decides to investigate some of the strange noises he's heard and ends up finding Gail's severed, decomposing head. This puts Nick into a catatonic state and he is temporarily admitted to a hospital.

Nick and Linda eventually consummate their new relationship, only for Linda to disappear the following day. This nearly devastates Nick and he's instructed by his physician Dr. Paulsen to take things slowly and to re-visit his apartment, as Dr. Paulsen believes that all of the unexplained phenomena have been a result of Nick's distress over the divorce and the stress of recording his album. Once at the apartment Nick notices that the apartment has been thoroughly cleaned with antiseptic and the carpeting replaced, which strikes him as strange since he left the apartment clean upon his departure and gave no orders to have anything replaced. He returns to the English manor and discusses this with Mrs. B, who tells him not to worry about any of this.

However, Nick is soon after attacked by the masked old woman. He flees and runs into Mrs. B, who reveals that the masked old woman is Mr. B and that they have killed Gail and Harry out of insanity and revenge. They're angry with Nick, as their only daughter had been obsessed with him and had committed suicide after he announced that he'd married Gail. The murders and supposedly supernatural occurrences were to be their way of getting even with him for everything and that their final act would be to kill Nick himself after slowly driving him insane. Mr. B then tries to kill Nick again, only for Nick to duck and for Mrs. B to accidentally take the fatal wound, which stops Mr. B from further attacking in favor of cradling his dead wife's body. Webster then arrives and upon seeing what happened, calls the police. Just before they arrive, Nick hears tapping in the walls and manages to locate Linda, who the Bs had entombed in the walls with the body of their dead daughter. The two go outside and as the police cart away Mr. B, Nick sees the ghost of Gail waving at him from one of the manor's windows, showing that some of the phenomena he'd experienced had been at least partially real.

== Cast ==
- Jack Jones as Nick Cooper
- Pamela Stephenson as Linda Everett
- David Doyle as Webster Jones
- Bill Owen as Albert B.
- Sheila Keith as Doris B.
- Richard Johnson as Macauley
- Patrick Brock as Dr. Paulsen
- Holly Palance as Gail Cooper
- June Chadwick as Nurse
- Penny Irving as Girl Singer
- Peter Turner as Harry Cunningham
- Jeff Silk as Police Officer
- David Hamilton as Radio DJ (uncredited)

== Production ==
=== Filming ===
The film was shot on location in London, Sussex and Surrey, England. Nick Cooper (Jack Jones)'s manor in the film was Foxwarren Park, Wisley, Surrey.

=== Music ===
The film was the last of five Pete Walker films with music composed and conducted by Stanley Myers.

== Release ==
The film was first released in the United Kingdom on 16 June 1978 and was subsequently given a theatrical showing at the Barbican Centre in London as part of a Pete Walker retrospective in November 2014.

=== Critical response ===
Critical reception has been mixed. Time Out panned the film, writing "Not even its brace of transvestite red herrings can help the story stand on its own feet." DVD Verdict and Twitch Film both gave mixed reviews for the film, and DVD Verdict wrote that "It's by no means a terrible film, just a soft one. There are too few jolts and too few kills. On top of that, the reveal is so out-of-left-field, it feels like a cheat." In contrast, HorrorNews.net and Steve Chibnall both praised the film, with Chibnall writing in the book British Horror Cinema that "The Comeback contains Walker's most accomplished exercises in suspense, but the film's tongue is more firmly in its cheek than ever before."

=== Awards ===
- Medalla Sitges en Plata de Ley - Best Cinematography at the Sitges Film Festival (1979, won)

== Legacy ==
The Comeback is considered to be more conventional than some of Walker's earlier works and has been credited along with Walker's Schizo as "foreshadowing the development of the slasher movie of the 1980s."

== Works cited ==
- Armstrong, Kent Byron (2003). Slasher Films: An International Filmography, 1960 Through 2001. Jefferson, N. Carolina: McFarland. ISBN 978-0-786-41462-8.
- Chibnall, Steve; Petley, Julian (2001). British Horror Cinema. New York: Psychology Press. ISBN 9780415230032.
- Shail, Robert (2007). British Film Directors: A Critical Guide. Carbondale, Ill.: Southern Illinois University Press. ISBN 978-0-809-32833-8.
