= Stewart Bevan =

British actor (1948–2022)

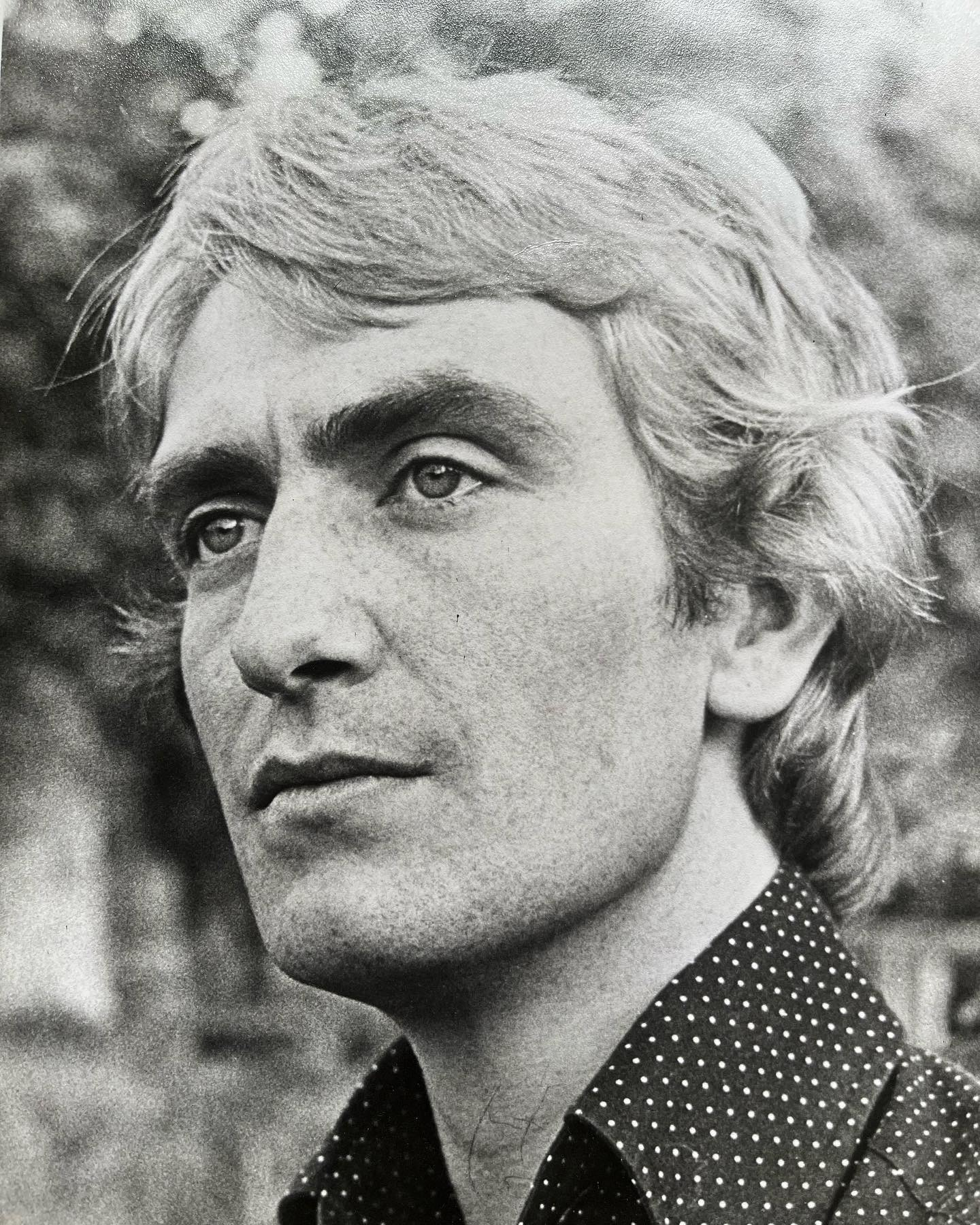
- Bevan in 1977
- Born: Stewart John Llewellyn Bevan; 10 March 1948; London, England
- Died: 20 February 2022 (aged 73)
- Education: Corona Theatre School
- Occupation: Actor
- Years active: 1966–2022
- Partners: Katy Manning (1972–1974); Virginia Moore (1977–2022)
- Children: 2

Stewart John Llewellyn Bevan (10 March 1948 – 20 February 2022) was a British actor with performances in both film and television. His career includes the films Brannigan (1975), The Ghoul (1975), House of Mortal Sin (1976), Ivanhoe (1982), Chromophobia (2005) and The Scouting Book for Boys (2009). In television, he played Clifford Jones in the 1973 Doctor Who serial "The Green Death" and Ray Oswell in Emmerdale (1977).

== Early life ==
Bevan was born into a Welsh family, his parents being Ray and Gwen Bevan. He spent his early years in Southall, Middlesex. After leaving school at the age of 15, he became a young manager in Pierre Cardin's menswear shop. At around this time he met the first love of his life Jackie, at the local youth club who encouraged him to join the local amateur dramatics society. Bevan participated in a festival at The Questors Theatre where he won an award for Best Actor. Shortly after this he decided to enrol at the Corona Theatre School he became friends with fellow actor Michael Des Barres. On his second day, the pair went to audition for small roles as teenage schoolchildren for the film To Sir, with Love which they both got, and performed side by side with Lulu and Sidney Poitier. During this time, Stewart performed as a dancer with Jayne Mansfield on her cabaret tour of clubs in the North of England.

== Career ==
After his role in To Sir, with Love (1967), Bevan had a part in the film Lock Up Your Daughters! (1969) before spent two years in a production of Conduct Unbecoming in the West End from 1969 to 1971 playing Lieutenant Edward Millington alongside Jeremy Clyde, Jeremy Bulloch and Gareth Hunt. His film credits include Burke & Hare (1972), The Flesh and Blood Show (1972), Steptoe and Son Ride Again (1973), The Ghoul (1975), Brannigan (1975) and House of Mortal Sin (1976).

TV roles include: Public Eye, Secret Army, Shoestring, Blake's 7, The Enigma Files, Ivanhoe, Airline, The Gentle Touch, Casualty, Silent Witness and Murder in Mind. He is well known for playing Professor Clifford Jones, a love interest for the Doctor's companion Jo Grant (Katy Manning), in the 1973 Doctor Who serial The Green Death.

Bevan also made many appearances in theatre including in Chase Me, Comrade, The Taming of the Shrew, Under Milk Wood, The Importance of Being Earnest, Come and Be Killed (1972), Fatal Affair (1974), Candida (1977) and Deathtrap in 2002 with David Soul and Susan Penhaligon.

In 2012, Bevan voiced the character of Inspector Nettles in an episode of the audio series Iris Wildthyme with Katy Manning for Big Finish Productions. Bevan also provided his voice for the part of BOSS for Big Finish Productions in their Torchwood audio series with Manning and John Barrowman.

In 2019, Bevan reprised his role as Clifford Jones opposite Manning in a trailer for the Doctor Who Season 10 Blu-ray box-set in which he and Manning also feature in a documentary where they revisit the filming locations for The Green Death. In 2020, the pair starred in another trailer in their roles from Doctor Who, this time for the Season 8 Blu-Ray box-set. A trailer for the Season 9 Blu-Ray box set confirms that Cliff has recently died, with Jo Grant acting to set up a charitable foundation in his name to continue his desire to protect Earth.

== Personal life ==
Prior to filming Doctor Who Bevan became engaged to Katy Manning; they were together for two years, 1972 to 1974. The plot of their joint appearance in Doctor Who saw Manning's character leaving the series to marry Bevan's character.

Bevan had a relationship with Virginia Moore, an actress, from 1977 until his death. They had two daughters.

Bevan died on 20 February 2022, at age 73.

== Filmography ==
=== Film ===
Year	Title	Role(s)	Notes
1967	To Sir, with Love	Schoolboy	
1969	Lock Up Your Daughters!	Tom	
1972	Burke & Hare	Bruce	
1972	The Flesh and Blood Show	Harry Mulligan	
1973	Steptoe and Son Ride Again	Vet	
1975	Brannigan	Alex	
1975	The Ghoul	Billy	
1976	House of Mortal Sin	Terry Wyatt	
1976	Spy Story	Sylvester	Uncredited
1981	4D Special Agents	Det. Sgt. Crane	
2005	Chromophobia	David	
2009	The Scouting Book for Boys	Frank	

=== Television ===
Year	Title	Role(s)	Notes
1966	The Troubleshooters	Twp Morris	Episode: "A Run for Their Money"
1973	Doctor Who	Prof. Clifford Jones	All 6 episodes of "The Green Death"
1975	Public Eye	Martins	2 episodes
1977	Romance	Rupert	Episode: "Emily"
1977	Emmerdale	Ray Oswell	8 episodes
1978	Accident	Interviewee	Episode: "Terri"
1979	Dick Turpin	Charles Fenton	Episode: "The Pursuit"
1979	Secret Army	Flight Sgt. Sharp	Episode: "The Last Run"
1979	Shoestring	Presenter	Episode: "Private Ear"
1979	Shoestring	Paul	Episode: "The Link-Up"
1979	Shoestring	DJ	Episode: "Stamp Duty"
1980	Blake's 7	Max	Episode: "Death-Watch"
1980	The Enigma Files	Lenny	Episode: "The Sweeper"
1980	The Onedin Line	The Mate	Episode: "A Royal Return"
1981	Lamaload	David	TV film
1982	Airline	Glover	Episode: "Conscience"
1982	Ivanhoe	Edward	TV film
1983	The Gentle Touch	Ray Gillespie	Episode: "Pressures"
1983	Nanny	Doctor Brogan	Episode: "The Sault"
1983	Number 10	Peter Evans	Episode: "A Woman of Style"
1984	The Brief	Chief Insp. Long	2 episodes
1987	A Dorothy L. Sayers Mystery	Sergeant Ryder	Episode: "Strong Poison: Episode One"
1988	Casualty	Kenith Pollard	Episode: "Desperate Odds"
1989	Shalom Salaam	Richard	2 episodes
1989	ScreenPlay	Stranger	Episode: "Seeing in the Dark"
1994	The House of Eliott	George Phillips	Episode: #3.7
1995	The Bill	Howard Sharpe	Episode: "Journey Home"
1996	Crocodile Shoes II	Superior Officer	Episode: "Boom"
1997	Silent Witness	Wyn's Man	2 episodes
1997	Brookside	Mr. Dawson	Episode: #1.1899
2002	Murder in Mind	Mourner	Episode: "Rage"
2004	Sherlock Holmes and the Case of the Silk Stocking	Proprietor	TV film
2005	The Brief	Chairman of the Jury	Episode: "Blame"
