= Dorothy Gordon (British actress) =

British actress (1924–2013)

- Publicity photo for Meet Me Tonight (1952)
- Born: 13 March 1924; Camberwell, London, England
- Died: 18 April 2013 (aged 89); Toronto, Ontario, Canada
- Occupation: Actress

Dorothy Gordon (born Dorothy Sharp; 13 March 1924 – 18 April 2013) was a British actress. She was the daughter of actors Leonard Sharp and Nora Gordon.

== Filmography ==
Year	Title	Role	Notes
1943	The Silver Fleet	Janni Peters	
1943	The Dummy Talks	Phyllis - Jack's Niece	Uncredited
1952	Meet Me Tonight	Elsie Gow	
1952	Women of Twilight	Sally	
1952	Winnie-the-Pooh	Piglet/Christopher Robin/Roo (voice)	
1953	Love in Pawn	Marlene	
1953	The Blakes Slept Here	Laura	Short
1953	Thought to Kill	Millicent Rogers	
1954	Hobson's Choice	Ada Figgins	
1954	The Crowded Day	Miss Bunting	
1955	All for Mary	W.R.A.C. Orderly	
1956	Lost	Ice Cream Girl's Friend	Uncredited
1956	Peril for the Guy	Miss Clark	
1958	Grip of the Strangler	Hannah	
1959	Life in Emergency Ward 10	Mrs. Phillips	
1959	Sapphire	Lily	Uncredited
1960	Sons and Lovers	Fanny	
1960	Never Let Go	Typist	
1961	The Secret Partner	Miss Kerrigan	
1963	The Marked One	Ruby	
1974	House of Whipcord	Bates	
1998	All I Wanna Do	Mrs. O'Boyle	
2000	Where the Money Is	Mrs. Norton	
2004	Sugar	Ancient Waitress	
2004	Siblings	Dorothy	Final film role

== Radio ==
In August 1954, Gordon starred with Peter Wyngarde in a BBC radio production of Jean Anouilh's Léocadia.
