= The Flesh and Blood Show =

1972 British film by Pete Walker

- American film poster
- Directed by: Pete Walker
- Screenplay by: Alfred Shaughnessy
- Produced by: Pete Walker
- Starring: Ray Brooks; Jenny Hanley; Luan Peters; Patrick Barr
- Cinematography: Peter Jessop
- Edited by: Ron Pope
- Music by: Cyril Ornadel
- Production company: Peter Walker (Heritage) Ltd.
- Distributed by: Tigon Films
- Release date: 23 September 1972
- Running time: 96 minutes
- Country: United Kingdom
- Language: English

The Flesh and Blood Show is a 1972 British horror slasher film directed and produced by Pete Walker, and starring Ray Brooks, Jenny Hanley, and Luan Peters. The screenplay was by Alfred Shaughnessy. It follows a group of actors being stalked and murdered by an unseen assailant while rehearsing a play at a derelict seaside theatre.

The film achieved a minor cult following in the years following its release.

== Plot ==
Actresses and roommates Carol Edwards and Jane Pruitt are among a group of unemployed actors who are assembled by an anonymous producer to appear in a stage play titled The Flesh and Blood Show. The performers arrive at the Dome Theatre, a dreary abandoned theatre on a seaside pier of East Cliff, where they are scheduled to begin rehearsals. Carol and Jane are met by fellow actors John and Tony, as well as Mike, the play's director. Inside the theatre, the group find actors Simon and Angela, who arrived prior. Yet to arrive is Julia Dawson, an actress who has recently forged a film career.

With local hotels closed due to it being the off-season, the cast are required to stay in the theatre during rehearsals. On the first night, Carol and Tony spend the night together, leaving Jane to room with Angela, who makes sexual advances toward her, which John witnesses. In the middle of the night, Angela goes missing and the group are awoken by the sounds of a woman screaming. Mike finds Angela's severed head in the basement, along with her body, which lay on a prop guillotine. Mike keeps his discovery a secret from the others. Later, a gloved individual fondles Angela's severed head. Mike summons local police to investigate, but when they arrive, they find several mannequin heads, but no sight of Angela's body. Police assume Mike's claim to be imagined. Mike subsequently discovers a note apparently written by Angela in which she states she had to quit the play.

Julia subsequently arrives at the theatre in the middle of the night. The following morning, she accompanies Mike on a walk, and tells him she feels a sense of déjà vu while inside the theatre. Mike confesses his experience from the night before, when he found Angela's corpse, which then vanished. That night, after getting into a fight with Tony, Carol goes for a walk along the pier. She is approached by what appears to be a cloaked vagrant who begins to sexually assault her. Mike and Julia go to search for her, and hear her screaming. Carol is saved moments after the assailant brandishes a butcher knife, and he flees. Mike realizes after that John is now missing, and suspects he may have been Carol's attacker.

Meanwhile, actress Sarah Hales, who is staying with her aunt, Mrs. Saunders, nearby, is hired as a replacement for Angela. Sarah's aunt opens her home to the actors, allowing them to dine and bathe there during rehearsals. Mrs. Saunders, along with her friend Major Bell, recounts the Dome theatre's history to the actors, including a story about how actor Harry Mulligan, his deranged co-star Sir Arnold Gates, and Gates's wife, Pamela, all went missing there during World War II. The story piques Julia's interest, and she visits the local library to reviews newspaper articles about the disappearances.

Major Bell visits the theatre and startles Sarah in her dressing room. Bell requests to observe the actors' rehearsals, which Mike agrees to at a later date. Meanwhile, Carol goes to retrieve a costume from the basement, and is locked inside by Tony, pulling a prank. A figure with a flashlight approaches her in a corridor, illuminating two skeletal remains, before she is attacked. Two fisherman find Carol floating below the pier, severely injured, and she subsequently dies in hospital. Inspector Walsh investigates the murder, which Mike asserts was committed by the unhinged John, who is still missing. Walsh tells Mike that Angela never returned home. Later that evening, John's corpse is found floating down shore from the theatre, and it is determined he was bludgeoned to death and stabbed. John's estimated time of death suggests he could not have been Carol's attacker.

During a rehearsal, someone begins toying with the stage lights, illuminating Sarah's nude corpse seated in an upper wing of the theatre. Mike forces the actors to hide in the dressing room, while he hears the voice of a man reciting lines from Othello in the auditorium. The man emerges from the shadows, revealing himself to be Major Bell. In a flashback, it is revealed that Bell – who is in fact Sir Arnold Gates – attacked his wife and co-star Harry after finding them having an affair. He then bound and gagged them, leaving them to starve to death in a locked room beneath the theatre, before departing with his young daughter. Gates wanders the theatre in a fugue state, reliving the night of his murders, and entering the dressing room where the actors are hiding. Inspector Walsh arrives moments later, and apprehends Gates. As Mike and the actors reflect on the events, it is revealed that Julia is in fact Gates's daughter, whom he abandoned after killing Pamela and Harry.

== Cast ==
- Ray Brooks as Mike Roger
- Luan Peters as Carol Edwards
- Jenny Hanley as Julia Dawson
- Patrick Barr as Major Bell / Sir Arnold Gates
- Robin Askwith as Simon
- Candace Glendenning as Sarah Hales
- Tristan Rogers as Tony Weller
- Judy Matheson as Jane Pruitt
- David Howey as John Thurlow
- Elizabeth Bradley as Mrs. Saunders
- Jess Conrad as young actor
- Rodney Diak as Warner
- Penny Meredith as Angela Wills
- Sally Lahee as Iris Vokins
- Raymond Young as Insp. Walsh
- Alan Curtis as Jack Phipps
- Brian Tilley as Willesden
- Jane Cardew as Lady Pamela Gates
- Tom Mennard as Fred
- Stewart Bevan as Harry Mulligan
- Michael Knowles as Curran

== Production ==
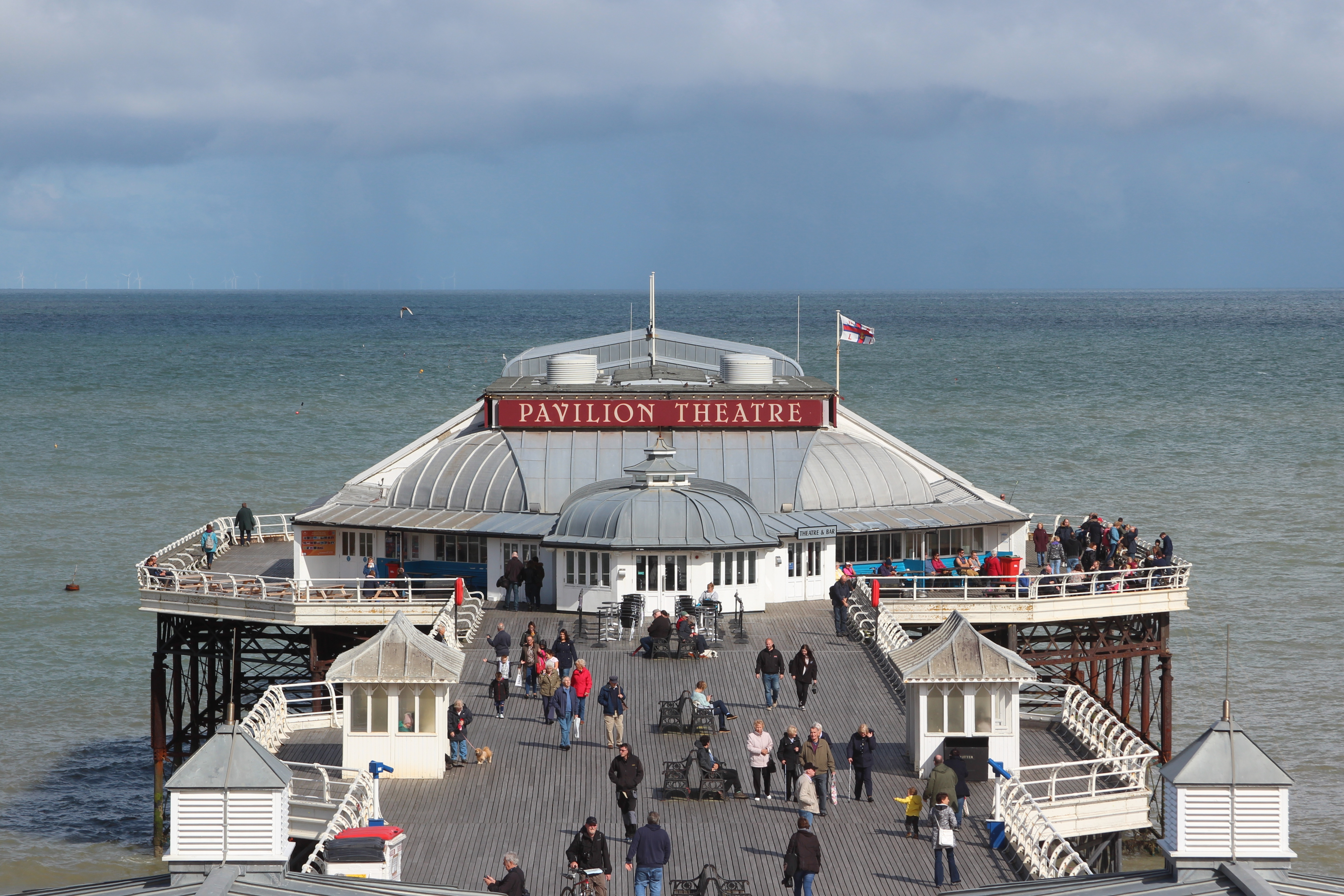
Filming occurred at the Pavilion Theatre on the Cromer Pier

The film was shot on location in Cromer, Norfolk. The seaside theatre in the film was the Pavilion Theatre in Cromer, England. The interior of the theatre was shot on Brighton pier.

== Release ==
The Flesh and Blood Show was released theatrically in the United Kingdom on 23 September 1972 by Tigon Films. The film's climactic sequence was originally filmed and shown in cinemas in 3-D. The film opened theatrically in the United States on 13 July 1973 in Boston, Massachusetts.

=== Reception ===
The Monthly Film Bulletin wrote: "Despite the standard interpolation of some unconvincing sex and a dismally unsuccessful 3D finale which is literally painful to the eye, The Flesh and Blood Show has an unexpectedly pleasing, old-fashioned quality about it, deriving partly from its elaborate Agatha Christie-type plot, and partly from its setting in a dilapidated old theatre at "Eastcliffe-on-Sea"(actually Brighton pier). The situations which develop from the classical elimination of suspects do become tiresome and are not helped by some coy humour, but at least the film makes good use of its theatrical setting. Patrick Barr livens things up enormously as the villainous Sir Arnold Gates, who apparently entombed his wife and lover after a particularly spirited performance of Othello; and there is a promising opening sequence in which the camera surveys the ominous black outline of the theatre on a stormy night to the sound of Gates' crazed Shakespearian ranting. Practically all of this atmosphere is dissipated in the subsequent intrigues of the young cast, but the basic situation and setting remain sufficiently atypical to sustain interest until the crushingly banal denouement."

André Loiselle, writing in Theatricality in the Horror Film: A Brief Study on the Dark Pleasures of Screen Artifice (2019) calls the film "A minor cult favorite".

=== Home media ===
The film was released on DVD by Shriek Show, a division of Media Blasters, in 2006. The special features are a picture gallery, a trailer, and an interview with the director. Kino Lorber issued a Blu-ray edition in 2014 under their "Redemption Films" line, both as a standalone release, as well as in a multi-film set titled The Pete Walker Collection II, alongside Frightmare (1974), House of Mortal Sin (1976), and Home Before Midnight (1979).

== Sources ==
- Hutchings, Peter (2009). The A to Z of Horror Cinema. Lanham, MD: Scarecrow Press. ISBN 978-0-810-87050-5.
- Hutchings, Peter (2018). Historical Dictionary of Horror Cinema (second ed.). Lanham, MD: Rowman & Littlefield. ISBN 978-1-538-10244-2.
- Loiselle, André (2019). Theatricality in the Horror Film: A Brief Study on the Dark Pleasures of Screen Artifice. Cambridge: Anthem Press. ISBN 978-1-785-27129-8.
- Pykett, Derek (2014). British Horror Film Locations. Jefferson, NC: McFarland. ISBN 978-0-786-45193-7.
- Schwartz, Carol; Olenski, Jim (2002). VideoHound's Cult Flicks & Trash Pics. Canton, MI: Visible Ink Press. ISBN 1-57859-113-9.
