= Dr. Terrible's House of Horrible =

- Genre: Comedy horror
- Created by: Graham Duff
- Written by: Graham Duff; Steve Coogan
- Directed by: Matt Lipsey
- Presented by: Steve Coogan
- Starring: Steve Coogan
- Composer: Willie Dowling
- Country of origin: United Kingdom
- Original language: English
- No. of seasons: 1
- No. of episodes: 6

Production
- Executive producers: Steve Coogan; Graham Duff; Henry Normal
- Producer: Alison MacPhail
- Cinematography: Francis De Groote
- Editor: Charlie Phillips
- Running time: 30 minutes
- Production company: Baby Cow Productions

Original release
- Network: BBC Two
- Release: 12 November – 17 December 2001

Dr Terrible's House of Horrible is a satirical British comedy horror anthology series created by Graham Duff, who co-wrote the series with Steve Coogan. BBC Two broadcast the series in 2001. The title parodies Amicus Productions' anthology film Dr Terror's House of Horrors (1965). Coogan presents each episode as Dr. Terrible, and plays various roles throughout.

The show spoofs the British horror films of Amicus Productions, Hammer Film Productions, and Tigon British Film Productions, and most particularly, such noted 1970s anthology series as Roald Dahl's Tales of the Unexpected and Thriller, with Amicus films, both series utilising different, well-known ensemble casts in each episode.

Horror film veterans Honor Blackman, Graham Crowden, Sheila Keith, Joan Greenwood and Angela Pleasence each guest-starred in an episode, in a pastiche of their earlier film performances. Mark Gatiss, John Thomson, Simon Pegg, Ronni Ancona and Warwick Davis also appeared.

Viewership of the six-episode series fell short of expectations, and the BBC declined to recommission it. 2 Entertain published it to DVD-Video on 4 August 2003.

== Episode list ==
Lesbian Vampire Lovers of Lust (Episode 1 in transmission order, episode 4 in DVD order)

Hans Brocken and his lovely new virgin wife Carmina are on their honeymoon when they encounter a castle owned by the mysterious Countess Kronstien. She and her ladies seem unusually interested in Carmina. Spoofs Hammer Films Productions films, especially the Karnstein Trilogy (1970–71).

Frenzy of Tongs

Gentleman inventor Nathan Blaze must battle the inscrutable Chinese criminal Hang Man Chan in turn-of-the-century London. Spoofs Sax Rohmer's Fu Manchu character, Hammer Film Productions' The Terror of the Tongs (1961), and the Doctor Who serial The Talons of Weng-Chiang (1977).

Curse of the Blood of the Lizard of Doom

Dr Donald Baxter's experiment with burn victims lead him down a dangerous path as he uses the regenerative powers of lizards on his patients with terrifying results.

And Now the Fearing... (Episode 4 in transmission order, episode 1 in DVD order)

Three people trapped in a lift retell their recent nightmares in 1970s London. Spoofs Amicus Productions' The Vault of Horror (1973).

Voodoo Feet of Death

A famous ballroom dancer loses his feet to a pair of gigantic scissors. After a quick foot transplant his feet start taking on a murderous mind of their own. Spoofs The Hands of Orlac (1960).

Scream Satan Scream!

Witch locator Captain Tobias Slater travels the north of England accusing beautiful young women of being witches and to avoid the pyre they must sleep with him, until he runs across a real coven and Slater is cursed. Spoofs Witchfinder General (1968) and Cry of the Banshee (1970).
