= Ivor Salter =

British actor (1925–1991)

- Born: Ivor T. Charley Packer; 22 August 1925; Taunton, Somerset, England
- Died: 21 June 1991 (aged 65); Coventry, West Midlands, England
- Occupations: Stage, film and TV actor
- Years active: 1957–1987

Ivor Salter (22 August 1925 – 21 June 1991) was an English actor who appeared in character roles in numerous United Kingdom television productions and films from the early 1950s until the 1980s often appearing as a police constable.

== Early life ==
Salter began his career in amateur dramatics in the Taunton district with the YMCA and Taunton Youth Club, later going into variety. In 1943, he joined the Royal Navy and a year later, was transferred to the British Army for three years. During this period, he was a member of various ship and regimental parties. Following the end of the Second World War, Salter secured a transfer to ENSA, travelling Italy and Austria. After being posted to Budapest for seven months when CSE succeeded ENSA, he was in charge of entertainment for the Military Mission.

As a result of his work in the army, Salter received a grant to study dramatic art, spending two years at the Italia Conti Stage School, winning a teaching diploma. This was followed by appearances in repertory at Colchester, Tunbridge Wells and Dewsbury, as well as the West End.

== Television ==
His television appearances included; Doctor Who (The Space Museum, The Myth Makers and Black Orchid), The Saint, The Avengers, Here Come the Double Deckers! (as the policeman), Danger Man, Ghost Squad, Nearest and Dearest (as Snatcher Snelling), The Gaffer (as the Returning Officer), On the Buses and The Diary of Samuel Pepys. Between 1978 and 1980 he appeared in the Midlands soap opera Crossroads as Bible-quoting Reg Cotterill. He played the character of Gobber Newhouse in three episodes of the BBC TV series All Creatures Great and Small.

Films included Be My Guest and House of Whipcord.

== Filmography ==
Year	Title	Role	Notes
1957	The Heart Within	2nd Constable	
1959	Desert Mice	Soldier	Uncredited
1963	West 11	2nd Man at Bus Stop	Uncredited
1963	The Man Who Finally Died	Ambulance Driver	Uncredited
1964	Dog Eat Dog	Dolph Kostis (Mr. Smithopopolis)	
1964	Who Was Maddox?	Mr. White	Edgar Wallace Mysteries
1964	Murder Ahoy!	Police Sergeant	Uncredited
1965	Be My Guest	Herbert	
1965	You Must Be Joking!	Hothouse Guide	Uncredited
1966	The Ghost of Monk's Island	Jacob Finch	
1971	Nearest and Dearest	Snatcher Snelling	
1971	On the Buses	1st Policeman	
1972	Four Dimensions of Greta	Hotel Porter	
1972	Lady Caroline Lamb	Major Domo at Chatsworth	Uncredited
1973	Tiffany Jones	Karatik	
1974	House of Whipcord	Jack	
1975	The Amorous Milkman	Policeman	Uncredited
1976	House of Mortal Sin	Gravedigger	
