= Frightmare (1974 film) =

1974 British film by Pete Walker

- Theatrical Release Poster
- Directed by: Pete Walker
- Written by: David McGillivray
- Story by: Pete Walker
- Produced by: Pete Walker; Tony Tenser
- Starring: Rupert Davies; Sheila Keith; Deborah Fairfax; Paul Greenwood; Kim Butcher
- Cinematography: Peter Jessop
- Edited by: Robert C. Dearberg
- Music by: Stanley Myers
- Production company: Peter Walker (Heritage)
- Release date: 6 November 1974
- Running time: 86 minutes
- Country: United Kingdom
- Language: English

Frightmare (also known as Cover Up and Once Upon a Frightmare) is a 1974 British horror slasher film directed and produced by Pete Walker, written by David McGillivray and starring Rupert Davies and Sheila Keith. The story focuses around Dorothy and Edmund Yates, who have recently been released from a mental asylum, and is one of Pete Walker's most notable films.

== Plot ==
Dorothy Yates lives with her husband Edmund in an isolated farmhouse in Surrey. They have just been released from a mental institution to which they were committed in 1957 after it was found out that Dorothy was a cannibal who killed and partially ate at least six people.

Jackie, Edmund's daughter by previous marriage, lives in London but secretly visits her dad and stepmum at night to bring her parcels containing animal brain, thereby implicitly feigning to commit murders for her so as to contain Dorothy's murderous urges. At the same time, Jackie tries to control her 15-year-old half-sister Debbie, Dorothy's actual daughter that she and Edmund had shortly before being committed to the asylum. Debbie has been recently thrown out of the orphanage. She now stays with Jackie and rides with her boyfriend Alec Marini, head of a violent biker gang. Debbie incites Alec to start a fight with a barman in one of London's hip nightclubs because he denied her liquor due to her being underage. When they get thrown out, the bike gang later ambush and assault the barman with a chain but leave when spotted. Debbie, however, decides to stay behind and hides the body in the boot of a car before the police arrive. When Jackie berates Debbie for coming home late, they have a severe argument in which Debbie in turn asks where Jackie goes at night.

Although Dorothy is apparently "cured", it seems as if she has had a severe relapse. Unbeknownst to Edmund at first, she secretly lures lonely young women to her home, promising tea and a tarot card reading, only with the sessions ending with a violent murder and "feast".

It is later revealed that Dorothy's cannibalism can be understood as an attempt to cope with a childhood trauma when she found out that she had eaten parts of her pet rabbit that her parents had cooked and served as dinner. Although her husband Edmund was convicted, it is later revealed that he only faked his dementia in order to remain with his wife. He is a truly devoted husband who loves his wife dearly and did not take part in the actual acts of murder in 1957 nor subsequently, but only helped to cover them up.

When Jackie discovers Debbie's bloodied jacket and finds out from her that she was involved in the barman's murder, she and her boyfriend Graham Heller, an investigative psychiatrist who has in the meantime himself found out about Jackie's family history, lead the police to the body in the boot. It is missing an eye - a wound that could not have been inflicted with a chain and is reminiscent of the wounds inflicted by Dorothy on her victims. As it is thus revealed, Debbie and Dorothy have been secretly meeting without Jackie's knowledge, and Debbie has apparently taken on her mother's pathological urges herself.

Meanwhile, Debbie escapes with Alec to the farmhouse, where Dorothy kills Alec. Jackie suggests that Graham call on her stepmum, and he goes there alone to talk to Dorothy, with Jackie following shortly after. When Graham arrives, Debbie reveals his identity to Dorothy, who kills him. When Jackie arrives, she encounters her dad alone, who tells her they feel Debbie belongs more to them than she. She starts looking for Graham and finds Dorothy and Debbie with his body in the attic. As Dorothy and Debbie circle in on her, Edmund, who has followed her there, blocks the door. As Jackie cries for his help, the film closes with a freeze frame of Edmund restraining his urges to come to her aid and looking in dismay at his daughter's imminent demise with a voice-over of what the judge had said to him and Dorothy when they were sentenced to the mental institution in court.

== Cast ==
- Rupert Davies as Edmund Yates
- Sheila Keith as Dorothy Yates
- Deborah Fairfax as Jackie Yates
- Paul Greenwood as Graham Heller
- Kim Butcher as Debbie Yates
- Leo Genn as Dr. Lytell
- Gerald Flood as Matthew Laurence
- Fiona Curzon as Merle
- Jon Yule as Robin
- Trisha Mortimer as Lillian
- Pamela Fairbrother as Delia
- Edward Kalinski as Alec Marini
- Victor Winding as Detective Inspector
- Anthony Hennessey as Detective Sergeant
- Noel Johnson as The Judge
- Michael Sharvell-Martin as Douglas Metchick
- Tommy Wright as Nightclub Manager
- Andrew Sachs as Barry Nichols
- Nicholas John as Peter
- Jack Dagmar as Old Man

== Production ==
The film was shot on location in Shepherd's Bush, London and in Haslemere, Surrey.

== Critical reception ==
Time Out wrote at the time of the film's release, "it is far better written and acted than you might expect, and Walker's direction is on another level altogether from Cool It Carol! or The Flesh and Blood Show. The problem is that there is absolutely no exposition or analysis, no flexibility about the theme; still contained within a basic formula, it tends to leave a highly unpleasant aftertaste"; while AllMovie wrote "Frightmare is a potent little chiller that is worth a look to horror fans in search of suitably grim fare from the 1970's and a worthy testament to Pete Walker's distinctive genre skills"; and DVD Talk wrote, "one of Peter Walker's best known and best remembered films, Frightmare gave the director the chance to really capitalize on his working relationship with oddball actress Sheila Keith and give her a starring role that fitted her unusual looks and acting style perfectly. At the same time, Frightmare also stands as an excellent example of the type of darkly humorous and semi-satirical horror movies that Walker excelled in, the kind that weren't afraid to rub the viewer's nose in the dirt a little bit or to give the establishment the big middle finger salute."

The critic Philip French, writing in The Times, stated that "Frightmare is a nasty, foolish and morally repellent British Horror film, without an ounce of humour though with a plethora of hilarious lines... What [the film] lacks in imagination it attempts to make up in gore. The consistently stolid pace is mitigated by the varied nature by which the cannibal dispatches her victims... The picture argues strongly that no patient should ever be released from an asylum for the criminally insane; this presumably is its bizarre claim to redeeming social value."
