= Tiffany Jones (film) =

1973 British comedy by Pete Walker

- Theatrical Film Poster
- Directed by: Pete Walker
- Written by: Alfred Shaughnessy
- Produced by: Pete Walker
- Starring: Anouska Hempel; Ray Brooks; Eric Pohlmann
- Cinematography: Peter Jessop
- Edited by: Alan Brett
- Music by: Cyril Ornadel
- Production company: Peter Walker (Heritage)
- Distributed by: Hemdale
- Release date: 12 April 1973 (UK)
- Running time: 90 minutes
- Country: United Kingdom
- Language: English

Tiffany Jones is a 1973 British comedy film directed and produced by Pete Walker and starring Anouska Hempel. It was written by Alfred Shaughnessy based on the British syndicated newspaper comic strip Tiffany Jones by Pat Tourret and Jenny Butterworth.

== Plot ==
The film focuses on Tiffany Jones, a photo model in Swinging London, who has a double life as a secret agent. The plot follows her as she tries to topple an Eastern European dictatorship in the fictional country Zirdana.

== Cast ==
- Anouska Hempel as Tiffany Jones
- Ray Brooks as Guy
- Susan Sheers as Jo
- Damien Thomas as Prince Salvador
- Eric Pohlmann as President Boris Jabal
- Richard Marner as Vorjak
- Martin Benson as Petcek
- Alan Curtis as Marocek
- John Clive as Stefan
- Geoffrey Hughes as Georg
- Ivor Salter as Karatik
- Lynda Baron as Anna Karekin
- Nick Zaran as Anton
- Walter Randall as Jan
- Martin Wyldeck as Brodsky
- Bill Kerr as Morton
- Kim Alexander Harry Wheeler
- Sam Kelly as Film Director
- Rose Hill as Prim Woman
- Tony Sympson as prim man
- Pearl Hackney as Demonstrating Woman
- Tom Mennard as Board of Trade Gent
- Derek Royle as Foreign Office man
- Maggie Walker as Rita Wells
- David Hamilton as himself

== Critical reception ==
Monthly Film Bulletin said "The Daily Mail's amiable comic-strip, involving the breakneck adventures and unrequited loves of a London model and aimed predominantly at a female readership, has been adapted to fit the baser requirements of commercial cinema. Tiffany herself has been transformed (not disagreeably) into a walking wet-dream in the Mayfair Penthouse style, repeatedly losing her clothes but never her virtue, and provoking her model friends to strip off their garden-party clothes on a thinly scripted pretext. In place of humour, the production has recourse to some of the more lethal devices of British farce – funny foreigners and inflated third-form puns. Beginning with a scene which sends up the absurdities of advertising films, Tiffany Jones derives its visual and histrionic style precisely from such films, and seems also to have one eye on the resuscitation of the long-defunct myth of Swinging London. Something of the spirit of the original has nevertheless been retained in the jolly scrapes of the storyline, and there is still an unattainable lover and a dogged photographer-admirer, though the latter bears little resemblance to the square-jawed dream-boy of the cartoon. Still, the fresh and spontaneous presence of Anouska Hempel saves the production from complete collapse under the burden of its painstakingly selected formulae."

The Radio Times Guide to Films gave the film 1/5 stars, writing: "Made in the days of dolly birds and psychedelia, this pathetic attempt to produce an Avengers clone, but with more nudity, is adapted from a newspaper's comic strip and has Anouska Hempel helping a denim-clad prince regain his throne from a wicked dictator. At least Ray Brooks has the talent to seem embarrassed, but nothing can faze director Pete Walker."
