= House of Whipcord =

1974 British film by Pete Walker

- US film poster
- Directed by: Pete Walker
- Screenplay by: David McGillivray
- Story by: Pete Walker
- Produced by: Pete Walker
- Starring: Barbara Markham; Patrick Barr; Ray Brooks; Ann Michelle; Penny Irving
- Cinematography: Peter Jessop
- Edited by: John Black
- Music by: Stanley Myers
- Production company: Peter Walker (Heritage) Ltd.
- Distributed by: Miracle Films
- Release date: 28 March 1974 (London)
- Running time: 102 minutes
- Country: United Kingdom
- Language: English
- Budget: £60,000

House of Whipcord is a 1974 British women-in-prison thriller film directed and produced by Pete Walker and starring Barbara Markham, Patrick Barr, Ray Brooks, Ann Michelle, Sheila Keith, Dorothy Gordon, Robert Tayman and Penny Irving. The film was Walker's first collaboration with screenwriter David McGillivray, who went on to write a further three films for him. It also marked the horror film debut of actress Sheila Keith, who went on to star in four more films for Walker.

== Plot ==
The film opens during a night-time thunderstorm when a frightened, confused and disheveled young woman, Anne-Marie, runs down a country road and is picked up by a trucker. We see through flashbacks how the young woman came to be in such a situation.

While at a gathering in a London art gallery, naive French model Anne-Marie DeVernet is shocked to see that her photographer boyfriend is exhibiting a recently shot photo where she is seen being arrested by the police for public nudity. Humiliated, Anne-Marie dumps the photographer but soon finds solace in enigmatic fellow partygoer Mark E. DeSade, who offers to take her to his isolated country estate to escape the scandal her now ex-boyfriend has caused her.

Unfortunately, Anne-Marie soon discovers that Mark is a procurer of young girls for 'moral correction' by his sadistic mother, ex-reform school matron Margaret. Years earlier, Margaret had been brought to trial when her corrupt reign over a girl's reform school led to the suicide of a young French girl under her charge (although in truth, Margaret murdered the girl and made it look like a suicide).

Found not guilty but dismissed from her job in disgrace, she seduced the High Court Judge who presided over her case. The judge, previously critical of the 'permissive society' of England of the 1960s and 70s, then left his wife for Margaret, who bore him a son (Mark) who worked with her to turn their mansion home into a secret illegal prison for 'morally corrupt' and 'delinquent' young women, complete with a group of tough female wardens who administer a harsh regime of corporal punishment upon their prisoners. However, the now retired, blind and senile judge is oblivious to the fact that Margaret is in fact using the prison to torture and punish these young women, who are also sanctioned with 'demerits' during their incarceration, such that strike one is solitary confinement for two weeks, strike two is 40 lashes, and strike three is death by hanging.

Anne-Marie soon falls foul of Margaret's cruelty as she reminds her of the girl she had previously killed and whose death cost her her career and reputation. Meanwhile, Anne-Marie's concerned flatmate Julia and Julia's boyfriend Tony track down Mark, who has now discovered the full extent of his mother's murderous deeds at the prison after seeing her minions dispose of a prisoner's corpse.

Anne-Marie makes multiple escape attempts, and finally makes it to the road where she is picked up by the trucker. She is unable to speak, and the truck driver ends up taking her back to the prison. The truck driver leaves her at the prison after the women claim to not know who she is but offer to nurse her back to health. Anne-Marie's friend eventually finds the prison, but is too late to save her. She has been hanged after earning a third 'demerit'. As the police arrive outside, Mark confronts his mother and is mistakenly killed by her. Margaret then hangs herself. The judge and his wife's henchwomen are arrested, and Julia and the other surviving prisoners are freed.

== Cast ==
- Barbara Markham as Margaret Wakehurst
- Patrick Barr as Justice Bailey
- Ray Brooks as Tony
- Ann Michelle as Julia
- Sheila Keith as Walker
- Dorothy Gordon as Bates
- Penny Irving as Anne-Marie DeVernet
- Robert Tayman as Mark E. Desade
- Ivor Salter as Jack
- Karan David as Karen Vaughan
- Celia Quicke as Denise
- Ron Smerczak as Ted
- Tony Sympson as Henry
- Judy Robinson as Claire
- Jane Hayward as Estelle
- Celia Imrie as Barbara
- Barry Martin as Al
- Rose Hill as Henry's wife
- Dave Butler as ticket collector
- David McGillivray as Cavan (uncredited)
- Denis Tinsley as Police Sergeant (uncredited)
- Pete Walker as cyclist (uncredited)

== Production ==
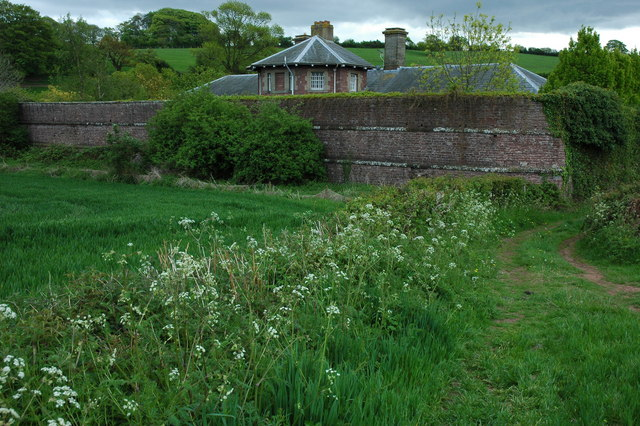
Littledean Jail, one of the filming locations

The film was shot on location in London and the Forest of Dean, Gloucestershire, England during the summer of 1973. The prison in the film was Littledean Jail, in the village of Littledean, Gloucestershire.

== Release ==
The film opened at the London Pavilion on 28 March 1974. In the United States, House of Whipcord was distributed by American International Pictures. In 1975, AIP reissued it under a new title, The Photographer's Model, in a double feature package with Thriller – A Cruel Picture (1973) re-titled Hooker's Revenge.

== Critical reception ==
The British Film Institute's Monthly Film Bulletin wrote: "House of Whipcord charts the dark side of the Festival of Light with a pop-Freud vengeance. ... The foundations seem laid for another Horror Hospital, but Pete Walker, following David McGillivray's no-nonsense script, has chosen to play it straight; the result is both his own best film to date, and one of those rare psychological horror movies that fits more in the line of Michael Powell's near-brilliant Peeping Tom [1960] than of Hammer's maniacs, paranoiacs and the rest."

Allmovie called it a "disturbingly effective horror film", writing that "Many viewers will be offended by the film's repressive right-wing tone, but its genuine scares and creepy atmosphere will outweigh its philosophical offenses for most horror fans."

Halliwell's Film Guide described the film as a "low budget psychological horror that stylishly achieves its object: to disturb", and quotes Derek Elley in Films and Filming: "Shows that something worthwhile in the entertainment-horror market can be done for the tiny sum of £60,000".

David Pirie wrote in Time Out: "An above average sexploitation/horror that has been put together with some polish and care from a fairly original script. ... The only trouble is that the film undercuts its potentially interesting Gothic theme by some leering emphases, and the final result is likely to be seen and appreciated only by the people who will take the dedication at its face value."
