= For Men Only (1967 film) =

British sex comedy by Pete Walker

- Theatrical release poster
- Directed by: Pete Walker
- Written by: Pete Walker
- Produced by: Pete Walker
- Starring: David Kernan; Andrea Allen; Derek Aylward
- Cinematography: Gerry Lewis
- Edited by: Peter Austen-Hunt
- Music by: Harry South
- Production company: Pete Walker-Border
- Distributed by: Border Films
- Release date: 1967
- Running time: 38 minutes
- Country: UK
- Language: English

For Men Only, also known as I Like Birds and Hot Girls For Men Only, is a 1967 British short sex comedy film written, produced and directed by Pete Walker. It was his debut production. The film has been shown in the UK on Rewind TV.

== Plot ==
Freddie Horne loves his job working for a trendy women's fashion magazine, but his pretty blonde fiancée is getting jealous. To smooth things over, Freddie takes a job with the Puritan Magazine Group, an organisation which promotes moral reform and "family values". However, the caddish chief executive Miles Fanthorpe is not all he seems, and his country house is actually full of scantily-clad young women, and he is secretly publishing a girlie magazine.

== Cast ==
- David Kernan as Freddie Horne
- Andrea Allan as Rosalie
- Derek Aylward as Miles Fanthorpe
- Tom Gill as father
- Neville Whiting as Claude
- Mai Bacon as mother
- Glyn Worsnip as Rudolph
- Joan Ingram as Esther
- John Cazabon as Lamphrey Gussett
- Apple Brook as receptionist
- Gladys Dawson as Mrs. Whitely

== Critical reception ==
Monthly Film Bulletin said "The permissive society is obviously making it more difficult to produce a prurient film. To convince us that there's something naughty about photographing girls in bikinis, this one resorts to the improbable device of creating a mild pornographer whose primary concern is to safeguard his reputation among East Grinstead churchgoers. And although none of its cast remains fully dressed throughout, its hero is just old-fashioned enough to marry the one girl who loses her clothes by accident rather than by design. Not that the film is provocative – merely embarrassing. And its crude scripting means that its elaborate car chase is entirely unmotivated."
