= Cool It Carol! =

1970 British film by Pete Walker

Cool It, Carol!
- Directed by: Pete Walker
- Written by: Murray Smith
- Produced by: Pete Walker
- Starring: Robin Askwith; Janet Lynn
- Cinematography: Peter Jessop
- Edited by: Tristam Cones
- Music by: Cyril Ornadel
- Production company: Pete Walker Film Productions
- Distributed by: Miracle Films
- Release date: 1 December 1970
- Running time: 101 minutes
- Country: United Kingdom
- Language: English

Cool It, Carol! (U.S. title: Dirtiest Girl I Ever Met; also known as Oh Carol) is a 1970 British sex comedy-drama film directed and produced by Pete Walker, starring Robin Askwith and Janet Lynn. It was written by Murray Smilth.

== Plot ==
Young couple Joe and Carol leave the sticks behind and journey to Swinging London in search of fame and fortune. Joe fails to find employment in the big city, but Carol rapidly becomes a model. As the naïve couple begin to enjoy the London night life they are drawn ever deeper into the sleazy but lucrative world of pornography and prostitution, with Joe acting as Carol's manager/pimp. Eventually it all becomes too much for them, and they return home to their former conventional lives.

== Cast ==
- Robin Askwith as Joe Sickles
- Janet Lynn as Carol Thatcher
- Jess Conrad as Jonathan
- Stubby Kaye as Rod Strangeways
- Derek Aylward as Tommy Sanders
- Kenneth Hendel as pimp
- Stephen Bradley as Terry
- Harry Baird as Benny Gray
- Chris Sandford as David Thing
- Peter Elliott as Philip Stanton
- Claire Gordon as Samantha
- Pete Murray as himself (credited as Peter Murray)
- Eric Barker as signalman
- Pearl Hackney as mother
- Martin Wyldeck as father

== Production ==
=== Development ===
According to the opening credits, "this story is true but actual names and places are fictitious", the film apparently having been inspired by an article the director read in the News of the World.

=== Filming ===
The film was shot on location in the villages of Northiam and Bodiam, Sussex and throughout London, England.

== Critical reception ==
The Monthly Film Bulletin wrote: "Despite an occasional flash of pubic hair, Cool It, Carol! is entirely anaphrodisiac. This is perhaps largely intentional, most of the sex scenes being treated with distancing irony. While the film doesn't stand up to criticism, it is beguilingly good-humoured, and the throwaway, laconic dialogue certainly has its moments. Peter Walker is not very good at constructing smoothly flowing sequences and the images tend to stand in isolation, though this can sometimes be a positive gain, as in some of the location shots. The film is quintessentially English, unconcerned and pragmatic, taking modelling, prostitution and blue movies in its bland stride. Its rather attractive underlying attitudes are summed up by Carol's father, who asks as she waits to go to London, "Is your maidenhead intact?" She replies that it isn't, whereupon he says she can go and gives her twenty pounds. Pragmatism."

Kine Weekly wrote: "This crude and salacious production has been carefully geared to appeal to a certain predictable minority. The film is supposed to be based on a real-life story. But never, surely, has Shropshire given birth to two such naive creatures as Carol and Joe. And never has success come so rapidly, nor been so casually rejected, as in this sleazy fairy-tale. The plot is, in fact, quite absurd; the script is very low-level stuff and the acting is only so-so, despite appearances from several well-known personalities, including Jess Conrad, Pete Murray and Stubby Kaye. Janet Lynn is a pretty little thing with a trim little body which the film is never tired of displaying. Her Carol is an indefatigable love-maker who manages to look sweet and cool even after five clients in a row. Robert Askwith brings clumsy charm to the role of her boyfriend Joe. Director and producer Peter Walker has put all his energies into the staging of the sex sequences, some of which are very titillating and most of which depend on heavy breathing or a voyeur's approach. Points of appeal: Sex."

DVD Drive-in wrote: "it’s no great film by any means, but it’s an enjoyable time capsule romp worth checking out."

Cinedelica wrote: "compared to a movie like Smashing Time [1967], Cool It Carol! is probably the more realistic portrayal of the swinging London dream. But we're still in the land of the exploitation flick, so don't expect Ken Loach-like realism."

Pablo Kjolseth writes at TCM.com: "in reflecting on scenes that stood out as memorable, my vote goes for the disturbing and eerie tight shots (seen more than once) of old men licking their dry lips with lusty tongues at the sight of nude, young women. These brief moments introduce an ominous, unpredictable, claustrophobic and icky energy into an otherwise languid story. An early indication, perhaps, that Walker's talents would be best served in a different genre."
