= The Flaxton Boys =

British children's TV series (1969–1973)

- Genre: Children's television
- Written by: Sid Waddell; Bill MacIlwraith; Gerry Andrewes; Gloria Tors; Stuart Douglass; Barry Cockcroft; Jeremy Burnham; Michala Crees; Anthony Couch
- Directed by: Robert D. Cardona; David Goldsmith; David Millard
- Starring: Peter Firth; David Bradley; Victor Winding; Richard Gale; David Smith; James Hayter; Philip Maskery; John Ash; Alan Guy; Nicholas Pennell; Veronica Hurst; Moultrie Kelsall
- Theme music composer: Sergei Prokofiev
- Opening theme: Extract from the Classical Symphony
- Country of origin: United Kingdom
- Original language: English
- No. of series: 4
- No. of episodes: 52

Production
- Producers: Jess Yates; Robert D. Cardona
- Production locations: Ripley Castle, North Yorkshire
- Running time: 52 x 30 mins
- Production company: Yorkshire Television

Original release
- Network: ITV
- Release: 21 September 1969 – 17 June 1973

The Flaxton Boys is a British historical children's television series set in the West Riding of Yorkshire and covering a timespan of almost a century. The series was made by Yorkshire Television and was broadcast on ITV between 1969 and 1973, running for 4 series and 52 episodes, each of 30 minutes duration.

The Flaxton Boys had a number of different scriptwriters, was produced by Jess Yates and Robert D. Cardona, and directed mainly by Cardona (45 episodes). Each of the series was set in a different era, spanning the years 1854 to 1945 and 1946.

The first series is set in 1854, during the Crimean War. Captain Andrew Flaxton has disappeared during his war service, while his wife Lucy and his son Jonathan inherit the dilapidated Flaxton Hall. The plot revolves around treasure hunting within the Hall. The returning Andrew finds the Hall's treasure and seemingly secures a safe future for his family. The second series is set in 1890, with Andrew in his old age and Jonathan having disappeared. An old friend is hired as the Hall's caretaker. Two boys prevent the takeover of the Hall by a hereditary foe. One of them is David, the previously unknown son and heir of Jonathan. The third series is set in 1928. David Flaxton was killed in World War I, and his widow Jane is the sole resident of the Hall. Their son Jonathan returns from his boarding school, and volunteers to convert the abandoned Stilgoe Lodge into an orphanage. The plot revolves around supposed hauntings in the Lodge. The fourth series is set in 1945 and 1946, in the aftermath of World War II. Jonathan returns from his war service, but he is unable to financially maintain the Hall. The Hall is largely destroyed by a fire.

== Plot, cast and episodes ==
The series is set at Flaxton Hall, near the fictional Yorkshire village of Carliston. Each series follows the exploits and adventures of a different generation of boys, in 1854, 1890, 1928 and from 1945 until 1946. The main protagonists in each series are respectively a young member of the Flaxton line and his closest friend, both portrayed as being around 12–13 years old.

Storylines are drawn mainly from the traditional staples of the Boys' Adventure genre, including plot elements such as hidden treasure, cryptic clues to be solved, ghostly apparitions, malign and unscrupulous villains, and spies. Each series is essentially self-contained in terms of cast and character.

However, two lead actors feature in more than one series: Victor Winding portrays Barnaby Sweet in series 2, and Sweet's son Benjamin in series 3 and 4, while Richard Gale plays Sir Peregrine Stilgoe in series 1, his son Sir Tarquin in series 2, and Miles Osborne in series 3. A constant element through all four series is narration by Gerry Cowan, who appears as Slight in series 1, Jacklin Flaxton in series 2 and as Roger Grafton in series 3.

=== Series 1 (1969) ===
It is 1854, and Captain Andrew Flaxton is posted as missing in the Crimean War. His wife Lucy and son Jonathan inherit the dilapidated Flaxton Hall, an imposing crenellated and ivy-covered property in the Yorkshire countryside. Jonathan befriends a local boy, Archie Weekes, and the pair spend their free time exploring.

Local legend maintains that a great treasure is concealed somewhere within Flaxton Hall or its grounds, and this spikes the interest and attention of the area's avaricious, ruthless and unprincipled villain Sir Peregrine Stilgoe, who hires three convicts to assist him in locating the treasure. Jonathan and Archie find themselves in constant danger, but manage to keep one step ahead of Sir Peregrine in his machinations.

A side-plot involves a strange ghostly female figure, reputed to haunt the local churchyard. The series ends with the safe return from the Crimea of Andrew Flaxton, who puts a swift end to Sir Peregrine's villainy and himself finds the treasure, which promises the family a secure and stable future.

Cast

- Peter Firth – Archie Weekes
- David Smith – Jonathan Flaxton
- Penelope Lee – Lucy Flaxton
- Richard Gale – Sir Peregrine Stilgoe
- James Hayter – Nathan
- Molly Urquhart – Flora
- Peter Clay – Capt. Andrew Flaxton

Episodes

1. "The Deserter" (21 September 1969)
2. "The Dog" (28 September 1969)
3. "The Watcher" (5 October 1969)
4. "The Tutor" (12 October 1969)
5. "The Smugglers" (19 October 1969)
6. "The Seafarer" (26 October 1969)
7. "The Patient" (2 November 1969)
8. "The Witches" (9 November 1969)
9. "The Bridge" (16 November 1969)
10. "The Hunt" (23 November 1969)
11. "The Island" (30 November 1969)
12. "The Will" (7 December 1969)
13. "The Return" (14 December 1969)

=== Series 2 (1970) ===
It is now 1890. Andrew Flaxton is now an old man, and his son Jonathan is revealed to have disappeared in unknown circumstances some years earlier. Archie Weekes (Jonathan's boyhood friend) is invited to come and run Flaxton Hall with his wife Sarah and son Peter. Sir Peregrine is now dead, but his villainy lives on in the shape of his son Sir Tarquin, who is plotting to take over the Hall in order to gain access to the large reserves of coal.

Sir Tarquin's ward, David Stilgoe, becomes friends with Peter, and together they constantly thwart Sir Tarquin's ambitions with their alertness and bravery. Other storylines include a feud between two local Chinese Tong organisations, and the escape of an unhappy and lovelorn young servant girl, assisted by the two boys. At the end, it is revealed that Jonathan has died, but that David Stilgoe was, in fact, his son and the heir to Flaxton Hall.

Cast

- David Bradley – Peter Weekes
- Philip Maskery – David Stilgoe
- Victor Winding – Barnaby Sweet
- Richard Gale – Sir Tarquin Stilgoe
- Gerry Cowan – Jacklin Flaxton (not in fact a member of the family)
- Hugh Cross – Archie Weekes
- Lila Kaye – Sarah Weekes
- Moultrie Kelsall – Andrew Flaxton

Episodes

1. "The Meeting" (20 September 1970)
2. "The Globe" (27 September 1970)
3. "The Heir" (4 October 1970)
4. "The Letter" (11 October 1970)
5. "The Diary" (18 October 1970)
6. "The Locket" (25 October 1970)
7. "The Valentine" (1 November 1970)
8. "The Conspiracy" (8 November 1970)
9. "The Messenger" (15 November 1970)
10. "The Discovery" (22 November 1970)
11. "The Attempt" (29 November 1970)
12. "The Homecoming" (6 December 1970)
13. "The Solution" (13 December 1970)

=== Series 3 (1971) ===
The year is 1928. David Flaxton was killed in World War I, and his widow Jane now lives at the Hall. Their son Jonathan returns home from boarding school for the summer holidays, accompanied by his friend William Pickford. The boys befriend a local character, the feckless but well-meaning Benjamin Sweet.

The Stilgoes have vanished from the scene and their former home, Stilgoe Lodge, is now in a state of advanced neglect and decay. The Lodge is to be renovated and turned into an orphanage, and Jonathan and William volunteer their holiday services in assisting with the reconstruction. However, things do not go to plan, as a steady stream of workmen are frightened away from the Lodge after claiming to have witnessed hauntings and other supernatural phenomena. Jonathan and William, with the help of Benjamin, eventually discover that the supposed hauntings are fake.

Also prominently featured in this series is the thwarted conniving of a Stilgoe family connection, Miles Osborne, to prevent the Lodge from being redeveloped. The series ends with the boys returning to school as the summer holiday ends.

Cast

- Alan Guy – Jonathan Flaxton
- Veronica Hurst – Lady Jane Flaxton
- John Ash – William Pickford
- Heather Page – Mary Porter
- Nicholas Pennell – Rev. Albemarle Dobson Partridge
- Victor Winding – Benjamin Sweet
- Richard Gale – Miles Osborne
- Gerry Cowan – Roger Grafton
- Royston Tickner – Sgt. Cornfield
- Gorden Kaye – P.C. Joseph
- John Ringham – Mr. Jackson
- Terry Scully – Mr. Wilkinson

Episodes

1. "All on a Summer's Day" (19 September 1971)
2. "A Quiet Sunday" (26 September 1971)
3. "A Fête Worse Than..." (3 October 1971)
4. "Snake in the Grass" (10 October 1971)
5. "In and Out of Hiding" (17 October 1971)
6. "The Fastest Gun in the West Riding" (24 October 1971)
7. "Trouble in the Air" (31 October 1971)
8. "To See...A Fine Horse" (7 November 1971)
9. "Things That Go Bump" (14 November 1971)
10. "The Ghost Catchers" (21 November 1971)
11. "The Lady in White" (28 November 1971)
12. "Down a Long Black Hole" (5 December 1971)
13. "Goodbye, Summer - Goodbye" (12 December 1971)

=== Series 4 (1973) ===
The final series takes place in 1945 and 1946, in the immediate aftermath of World War II. During the war Flaxton Hall has been requisitioned by the army. Matthew Flaxton befriends Terry Nichols, an evacuee from London who has no home to return to following the disappearance of his parents. Storylines in this series centre on suspicions of spies being operational in the Carliston area and the boys' interaction with enemy combatants being held as prisoners of war in the locality.

The series closes with Flaxton Hall largely being destroyed by a fire, accidentally caused by an upper-class-twit character, Gerald Meder, after Jonathan Flaxton has returned from the war and has expressed grave doubts over whether he will be able to maintain the hall in the new political and economic circumstances; this can be seen as an analogy for the destruction of country houses in 20th-century Britain. Nonetheless, the family plan to continue in business, and with Terry's parents having returned, they announce that they will move to Yorkshire and he will stay in the area.

Cast

- Philip Baldwin – Terry Nichols
- Joanna Marie Jones – Elizabeth Flaxton
- Andrew Packett – Matthew Flaxton
- Pamela Duncan – Edith
- Victor Winding – Benjamin Sweet
- Murray Melvin – Gerald Meder
- Derek Benfield – Sgt. Brophy
- Cyril Luckham – Peter Weekes
- Jill Summers – Porter
- Tom Browne – Captain Ewing

Episodes

1. "Is Your Journey Really Necessary?" (25 March 1973)
2. "This Little Piggy" (1 April 1973)
3. "What You Don't Know Might Hurt You" (8 April 1973)
4. "No Place Like..." (15 April 1973)
5. "The Bevin Boy" (22 April 1973)
6. "Welcome Home Tommy Atkins" (29 April 1973)
7. "It Fell off the Back of a Lorry" (6 May 1973)
8. "Charity Begins at..." (13 May 1973)
9. "Things Are Not What They Seem" (20 May 1973)
10. "Cry Wolf" (27 May 1973)
11. "A Funny Kind of Day" (3 June 1973)
12. "Remember, Remember" (10 June 1973)
13. "Keep the Home Fires Burning" (17 June 1973)

== Additional information ==
Location filming for The Flaxton Boys took place at Ripley Castle, four miles north of Harrogate. The castle owner, Sir Thomas Ingilby, credited the series for a dramatic rise in visitor numbers, turning the establishment from a local into a regional attraction.

The theme tune for the series was an excerpt from Sergei Prokofiev's Classical Symphony. Episodes were originally broadcast early on Sunday evenings, at the time the traditional "family" timeslot in the UK for historical drama made for children but with appeal to an adult audience also, such as The Adventures of Black Beauty.

Comic strip versions of series three and four appeared in Look-in in 1971 and TV Comic from July 1973 to June 1974, respectively.

The Flaxton Boys continued to be repeated on various networks both in the UK and overseas until the early 1990s. Unusually for the era, its location recordings were on videotape rather than film, except for some limited use of film in the last series. The series has always been fully extant in the Yorkshire Television archives, but until 2015 only the first episodes of the first two series had been released commercially, in the Look-Back on 70s Telly series. The complete first series was released on DVD by Network in July 2015 although in some instances the recordings had decayed (an acknowledged problem with videotaped children's programmes in the Yorkshire TV archive). In 2017, the second series, the third series and the fourth series were released.

== Home media ==
The Flaxton Boys - The Complete Series was released on DVD in 2023 in an 8-disc box set by Network.
