= Schizo (1976 film) =

1976 British film by Pete Walker

- US poster (1977)
- Directed by: Pete Walker
- Written by: David McGillivray
- Produced by: Pete Walker
- Starring: Lynne Frederick; John Leyton; Stephanie Beacham; John Fraser
- Cinematography: Peter Jessop
- Edited by: Alan Brett
- Music by: Stanley Myers
- Production company: Pete Walker (Heritage) Ltd
- Distributed by: Columbia-Warner
- Release date: 11 November 1976
- Running time: 109 minutes
- Country: United Kingdom
- Language: English

Schizo is a 1976 British psychological horror slasher film directed and produced by Pete Walker and starring Lynne Frederick, John Leyton and Stephanie Beacham. It was written by David McGillivray.

== Plot ==
Samantha Gray, a famous figure skater, is engaged to London businessman Alan Falconer. On the day of Alan and Samantha's wedding, ex-convict William Haskin begins stalking Samantha. Over the next few days, Haskin terrifies Samantha by leaving bloody knives in various locations, including her home.

Samantha tells her psychiatrist friend, Leonard Hawthorne, that Haskin was her mother's lover until he brutally stabbed her to death during an argument. Now that Haskin has been released from prison, Samantha thinks that he is trying to kill her. That night, Leonard is found murdered in his car, his throat slashed.

Samantha's housekeeper, Mrs Wallace, takes Samantha to see her daughter Joy, a medium who channels Leonard's spirit and warns Samantha that the killer is close by. While making her way home, Joy is bludgeoned with a hammer and thrown under a moving bus. At Samantha's house, Samantha finds Mrs Wallace dead in the cellar, stabbed through the head.

Samantha confronts Haskin at Alan's factory. Haskin tells Samantha that he is not a murderer and was wrongfully convicted: Samantha has a split personality, part of which is murderous, and killed her own mother. He explains that the bloody knives were intended as clues to force her to remember and confess. A physical struggle ensues, which ends with Haskin being fatally impaled on one of the factory machines.

Some time later, Alan and Samantha depart for their honeymoon. Unbeknownst to Alan, Samantha has packed a knife in her luggage.

== Cast ==
- Lynne Frederick as Samantha Gray
  - Victoria Allum as Young Samantha Gray
- John Leyton as Alan Falconer
- Stephanie Beacham as Beth
- John Fraser as Leonard Hawthorne
- Jack Watson as William Haskin
- Queenie Watts as Mrs. Wallace
- Trisha Mortimer as Joy Wallace
- Paul Alexander as Peter McAllister
- Robert Mill as maître d'
- Diana King as Mrs. Falconer
- Colin Jeavons as Commissioner
- Victor Winding as Sergeant
- Raymond Bowers as manager
- Pearl Hackney as séance woman
- Terry Duggan as editor
- Lindsay Campbell as falconer
- Wendy Gilmore as Mrs. Gray
- Primi Townsend as secretary
- John McEnery as Stephens

== Production ==
=== Casting ===
Lynne Frederick had known director Pete Walker since she was 14 years old (her mother Iris was a friend and co-worker of Walker's). However, Schizo is the only film that they worked on together.

Frederick started work on the film just days after wrapping on Voyage of the Damned (1976). When Frederick was cast, Walker was under the impression that she still had her trademark long hair. Unbeknownst to him, Frederick had cut it short for her previous role in Voyage of the Damned.

=== Filming ===
The film was shot on location in Newcastle upon Tyne and London, England.

Due to the film's low budget, many of Frederick's clothes came from her own personal wardrobe. Frederick had worn many of these outfits the previous year in A Long Return (1975).

== Release ==
The film was release in the US on 7 December 1977.

=== Censorship ===
According to Kino Lorber —the film's distributor—, the British Board of Film Classification ordered the cutting of more than a minute of footage from the theatrical release of Schizo in the United Kingdom.

=== Critical reception ===
In The Monthly Film Bulletin, Tom Milne wrote "Not one of the happier Walker-McGillivray collaborations, Schizo starts off on the wrong foot with a truly hackneyed come-on (an awed transatlantic voice solemnly explaining the joys of schizophrenia), and thereafter trudges wearily into a morass of evasions and red herrings as the plot twists and turns in a frenzied attempt to obscure the fact, obvious from the very start, that beleaguered heroine and bloodthirsty killer are one and the same. Deprived of any support from the script this time, Pete Walker's direction, all thump, scream and cut as shadows lurk and doorknobs turn – with each cliché heralded by a triumphant tremolo or bass boom from the score – reduces the whole thing to risible absurdity in which even the studiously nasty murders (Mrs. Wallace killed by a knitting-needle rammed right through her skull) are unconvincing. "

Time Out wrote: "Walker and writer David McGillivray's most ambitious project to date attempts to shake off the low-budget horror/exploitation tag with a move into more up-market psychological suspense. If the formula is thread-worn – a trail of victimisation, sexual paranoia, and murder in the wake of the heroine's wedding - at least some effort is made to locate it (rich, middle-class London). But things collapse disastrously in the second half. Caught between sending itself up and taking itself seriously, the film ends closer to the silliness of Francis Durbridge than to the menace of Alfred Hitchcock."

== Legacy ==
Although the film was not a success during its initial release., it became a cult classic in the horror movie community. The underground success of the film was in part due to Lynne Frederick’s new found cult fanbase. This film, along with Vampire Circus (1971), helped establish Frederick as a scream queen icon of the 1970s.
