= Jane Hayward (actress) =

British actress (1950–2019)

- Born: 26 April 1950
- Died: 15 June 2019 (aged 69); Rickmansworth, Hertfordshire, England
- Occupation: Actress
- Years active: 1968–2019

Jane Hayward (26 April 1950 — 15 June 2019) was a British actress.

Hayward made appearances in over twenty films and television programmes. She had roles in productions such as 2001: A Space Odyssey, BBC police procedural drama The Bill, Never the Twain, and Executive Stress.

== Career ==
In the 1970s, Jane Hayward focused her career mostly on the stage. Her roles included A Midsummer Night's Dream at the Ipswich Theatre, the title role in Cinderella at the Northampton Theatre Royal, and Jane Eyre, the stage adaptation of Dial M for Murder, and The Woman in White, also at the Northampton Theatre Royal.

Hayward returned to the acting profession in 2011 after taking a break to raise her family.

== Death ==
She died after being hit by an Arriva Shires & Essex double-decker bus in Rickmansworth, Hertfordshire in June 2019. BBC News reported in November 2019 that Hayward attempted to "cross the road without looking”. At the time of the accident, BBC News reported that Hayward died at the scene.

== Filmography ==
Year	Title	Role	Notes
1968	2001: A Space Odyssey		Uncredited
1973	Softly, Softly: Taskforce	Shop Assistant	Episode: "Trial"
1974	House of Whipcord	Estelle	
1976	House of Mortal Sin	Nurse Fowler	
1978	Tycoon	Secretary	Episode: "Deeds and Misdeeds"
1983	The Consultant	Susan Faulkner	4 episodes
1983	Bergerac	Receptionist	Episode: "A Hole in the Bucket"
1984	Tenko	Enid Trotter	1 episode
1986	Brookside	Penny Fleming	
1986	Fresh Fields	Mrs. Hemmings	Episode: "A Nose for Trouble"
1987	Executive Stress	Patsy Stuart	2 episodes
1988	The Bill	Yuppie Woman	Episode: "Evacuation"
1989-1990	The Labours of Erica	Sonia	2 episodes
1990	Never the Twain	Sue Preston	Episode: "S.W.A.L.K."
2014	The Crow Scarer	Lilly	
2015	Five Pillars	Mary	
2017	The Generator	Mona	
2018	My Month with Mrs Potter	Mrs. Potter	
2018	Love Sticks	Denise Blossom	
