= Pete Walker (director) =

English film director, writer and producer (born 1939)

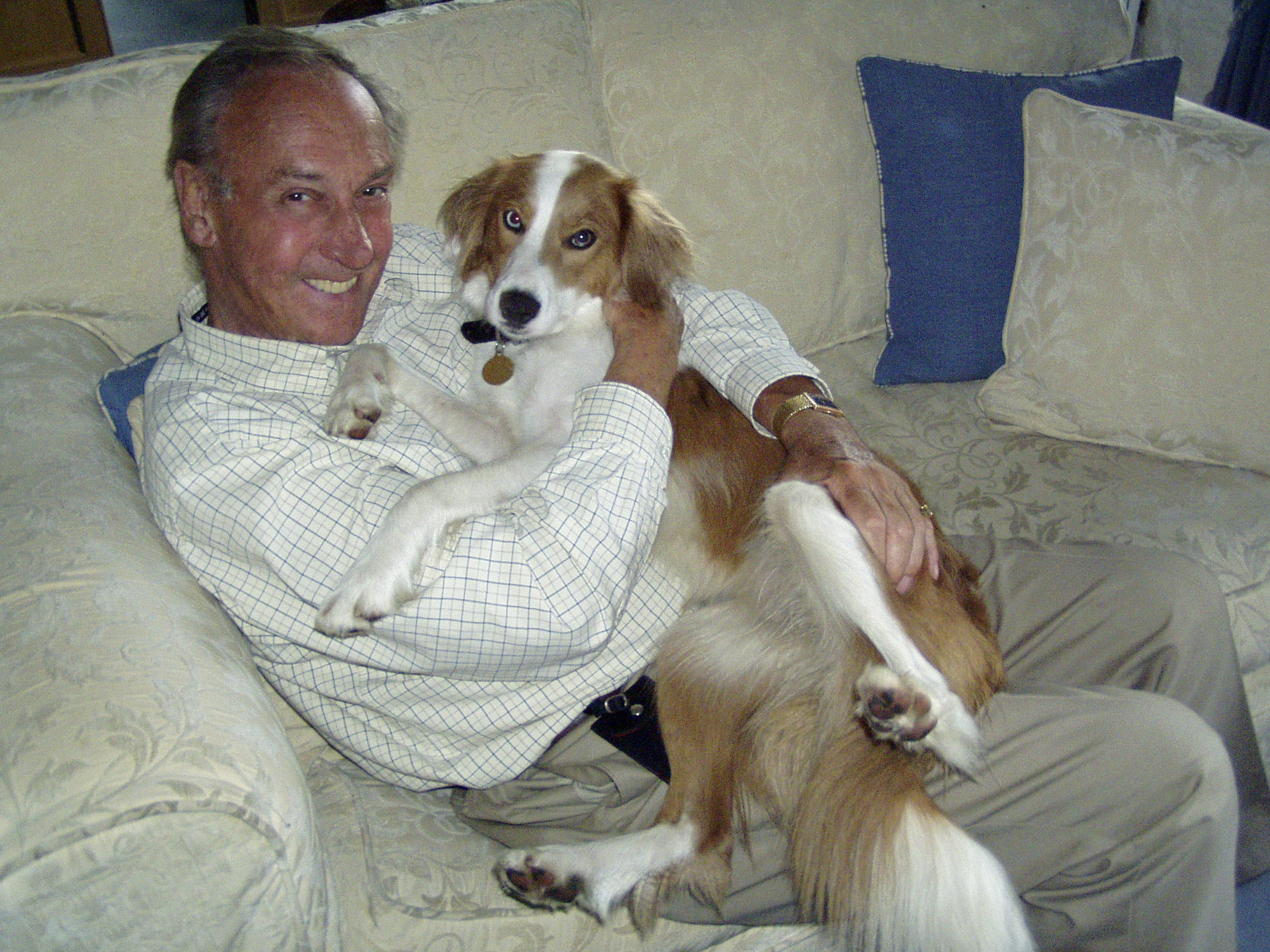
- Born: 4 July 1939 (age 87); Brighton, Sussex, England
- Occupations: Film director; screenwriter; film producer
- Parent: Syd Walker (father)

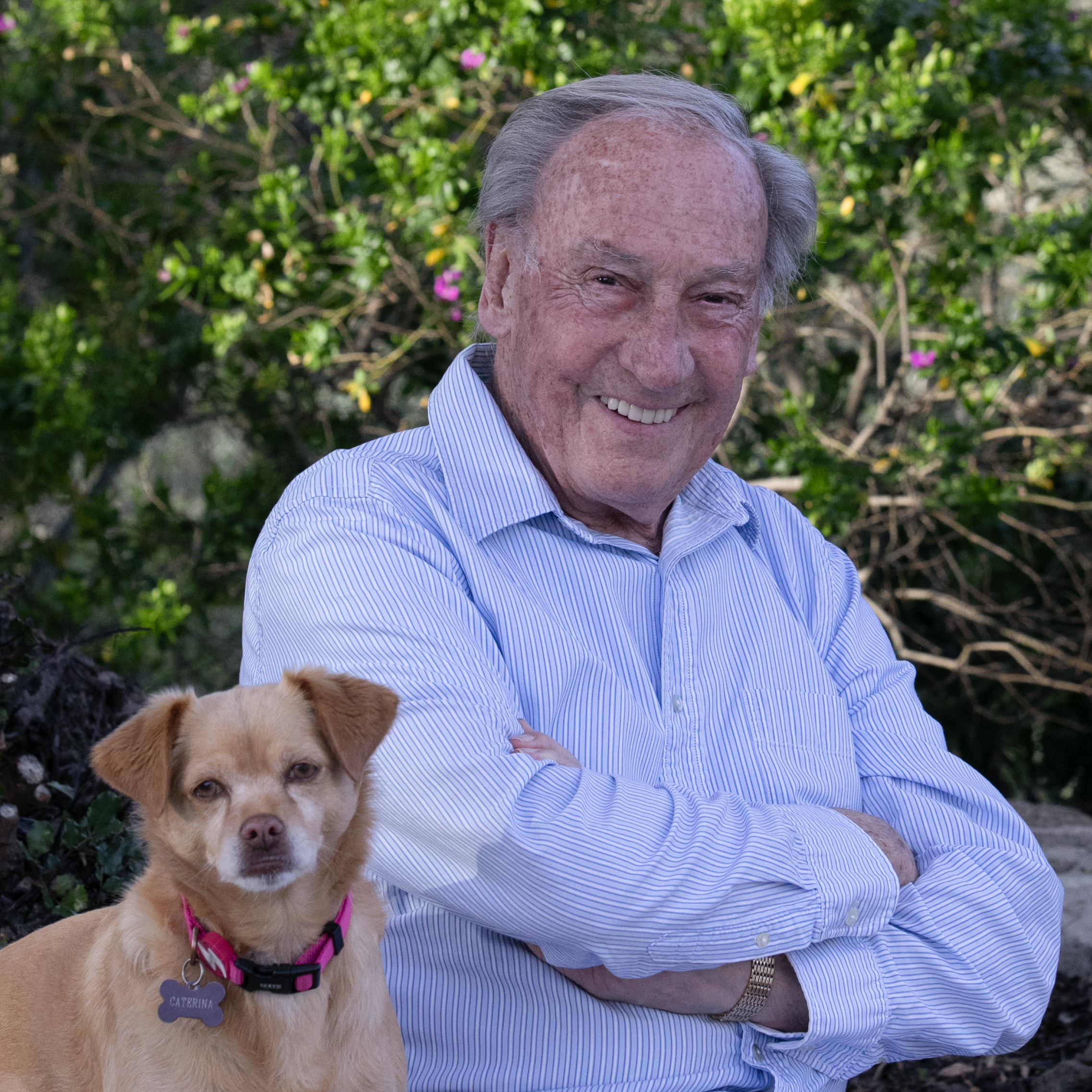
At Home In Portugal With Caterina, March 2026

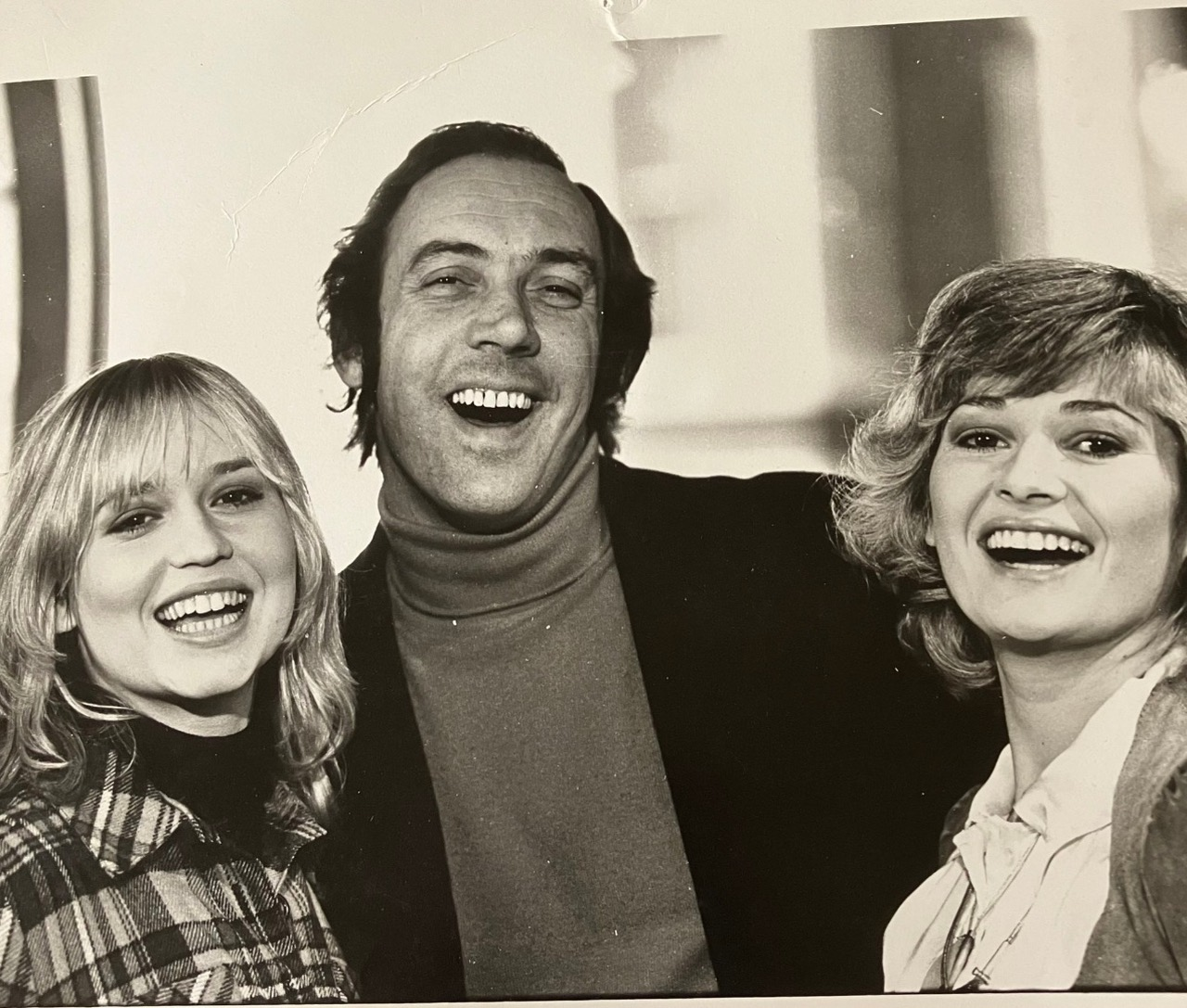
Susan Penhaligon, Pete Walker and Stephanie Beecham on the set of House of Mortal Sin (1976)

Pete Walker (born 4 July 1939) is an English film director, writer, and producer specialising in horror and sexploitation films, frequently combining the two.

== Life and career ==
Walker was born on 4 July 1939 in Brighton, England, the son of comic Syd Walker and a showgirl mother. He began his performing career as a stand-up comic while a teenager, but quit at age 19.

Walker made films such as Die Screaming, Marianne, The Flesh and Blood Show, House of Whipcord, Frightmare, House of Mortal Sin, Schizo, The Comeback, and House of the Long Shadows. His films often feature sadistic authority figures, such as priests or judges, punishing people – usually young women – who do not conform to their strict personal moral codes. Because of the speed with which he had to make his films, Walker often used the same actors, including Andrew Sachs and Sheila Keith.

Walker retired from filmmaking to focus on buying and restoring cinemas.

Asked whether his films have hidden depths, Walker replied: "Of course they didn't. But recently I had to record commentary for the DVD releases, so I saw the films for the first time since making them, and you know what? They're not as bad as I thought. But searching for hidden meaning ... they were just films. All I wanted to do was create a bit of mischief."

== Filmography ==
Year	Title	Notes	Ref.
1967	I Like Birds	Directorial Debut; Alternative title: For Men Only	
1968	The Big Switch	Alternative title: Strip Poker	
1969	School for Sex		
1970	Man of Violence	Alternative title: Moon	
1970	Cool It Carol!	Alternative title: Dirtiest Girl I Ever Met	
1971	Die Screaming, Marianne	Alternative title: Die, Beautiful Marianne	
1972	Four Dimensions of Greta	Alternative title: The Three Dimensions of Greta	
1972	The Flesh and Blood Show		
1973	Tiffany Jones		
1974	House of Whipcord		
1974	Frightmare	Alternative titles: Cover Up and Once Upon a Frightmare	
1976	House of Mortal Sin	Alternative titles: The Confessional and The Confessional Murders	
1976	Schizo		
1978	The Comeback	Alternative title: The Day the Screaming Stopped	
1979	Home Before Midnight		
1983	House of the Long Shadows		

== Sources ==
- Chibnall, Steve (1998). Making Mischief: The Cult Films of Pete Walker. London, England: FAB Press. ISBN 978-0-9529260-1-6.
- Rigby, Jonathan (2000). English Gothic: A Century of Horror Cinema (Third ed.). London, England: Reynolds & Hearn. ISBN 978-1-903111-79-6.
