= Eye of the Wind =

German 20th c. schooner

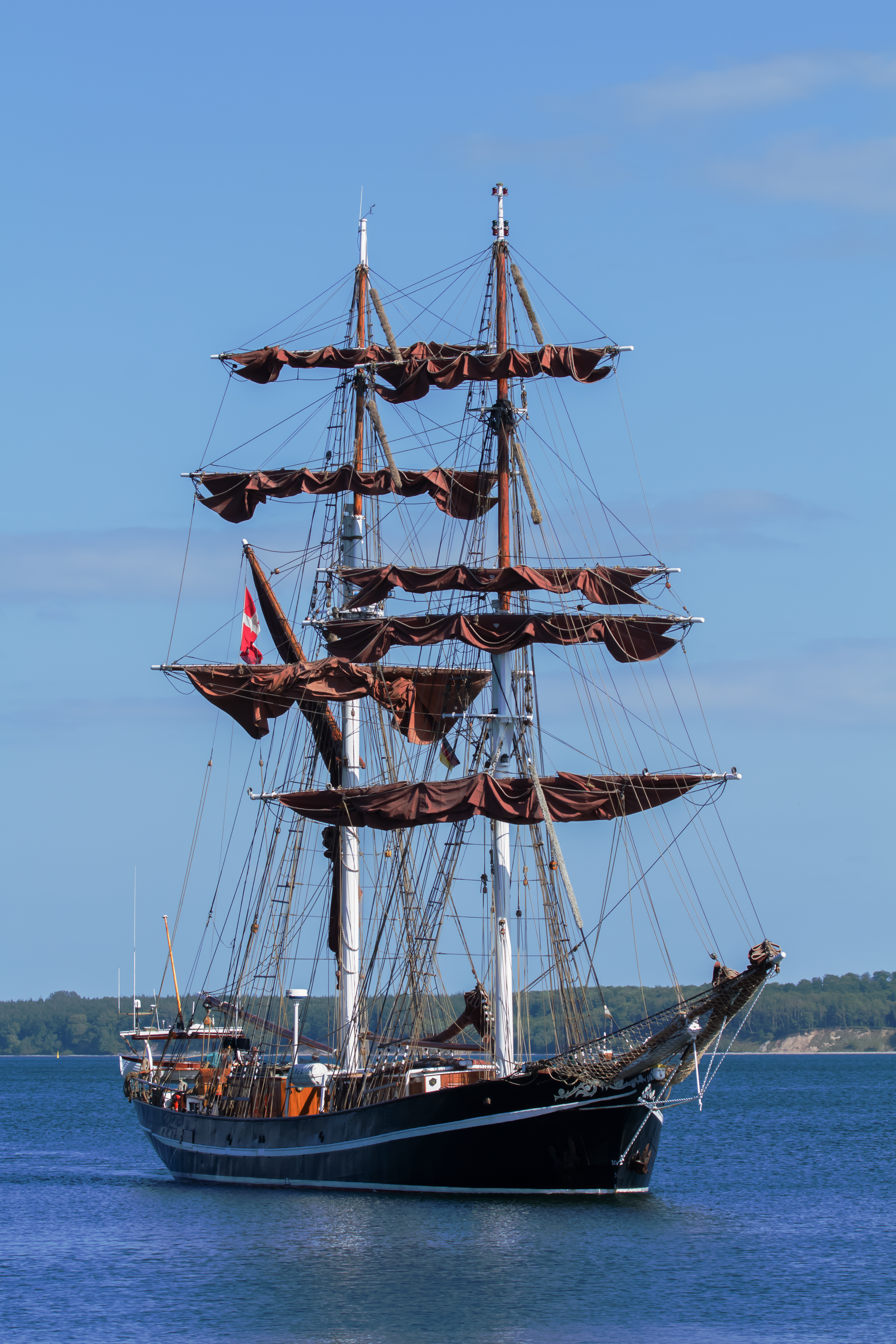

History
- Name: Eye of the Wind
- Operator: FORUM train & sail GmbH
- Builder: C. H. Lühring Werft, Brake, Germany
- In service: 1911
- Renamed: 1911 - 1924 Friedrich, 1924 - 1926 Sam, 1926 - 1955 Merry, 1955 - 1960s Rose Marie, 1960s - 1973 Merry, 1973 Eye of the Wind
- Home port: Germany
- Identification: IMO number: 5299864; MMSI number: 219011351; Callsign: OYJG2
- Status: In service

General characteristics
- Type: Brigantine
- Length: 40.23 m (132 ft) (LOA)
- Beam: 7.01 m (23 ft)
- Draft: 2.70 m (9 ft)
- Propulsion: Sail, engine: 600 HP
- Sail plan: Brigantine; 750 m^{2} (8,073 sq ft)

Eye of the Wind is a brigantine converted in the 1970s from the topsail schooner Friedrich built in 1911 at the C. H. Lühring shipyard in Brake, Germany.

== History ==
The schooner Friedrich initially sailed in the South American hide trade. In 1923 she was registered in Sweden, under the name Merry, and was used for transport in the Baltic and North seas and for fishing herring off the coast of Iceland during summer. In 1969, then stripped of her masts and sailing as a motor vessel, she was severely damaged in a fire that almost destroyed her.

In 1973 a group of sailing enthusiasts, including Anthony "Tiger" Timbs, who later became her Master, began rebuilding her at Faversham, England. In this restoration she was re-rigged as a brigantine by master rigger Wally Buchanan. After the restoration was completed she was given the name Eye of the Wind, inspired by Sir Peter Scott's 1961 book. In October 1976 she set sail for Australia three years and eight months after her purchase by the new owners.

In 1978, she sailed from Plymouth as the flagship of Operation Drake, a 2-year sailing expedition, which brought her back to London in December 1980.

While under the care of Timbs the ship was commissioned for several film roles. During the filming of Tai-Pan, the film producers fitted her with a set of tan sails in order to be able to play two different ships. The tan sails were retained after filming.

In 2001, she was taken over by a new owner and registered in Gilleleje, Denmark. Her interior underwent substantial renovations. Also, the new owners decided to call her rig a brig. This was only a change of naming, the rig remained the same since the filming of Tai Pan. In 2009 she was purchased by the Forum Media Group, Germany.

== Published books ==
- Eye of the Wind, by E. A. Mitchener (1984 Published by the author 1984, ISBN 0-9591286-0-3)
- Eye of the Wind - Einem Traum auf der Spur (German), by Harald Focke and Ulf Kaack, 2014, Forum Media ISBN 3865863795
- The Ship That Changed A Thousand Lives - over a century of history and stories, published by Ina Koys, 2019 ISBN 3947536372, Amazon only

== Filmography ==
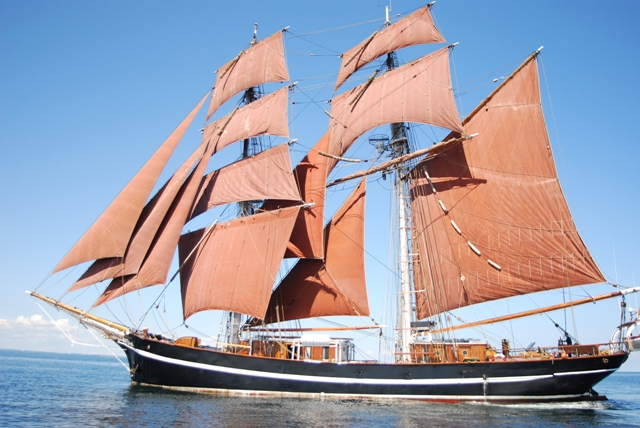
The brigantine under sail

Eye of the Wind has been used for several film and television roles.

- The Blue Lagoon (1980) where the ship appears as the Northumberland.
- White Squall (1996) as the Albatross.
- Tai-Pan (1986) as the Morning Cloud and the White Witch.
- Nate & Hayes (1983) as the Leonora.
- Lost at Sea: The Search for Longitude (1998), an episode of the U.S. television series NOVA.
