= James Cogan =

James Cogan may refer to:

- James Cogan (teacher), former deputy headmaster of Westminster School
- James Cogan, namesake of James Cogan House
- James Cogan, fictional character in Haven (TV series)
