= White Squall =

White Squall may refer to:

- White squall, a meteorological phenomenon
- White Squall (film), a 1996 American drama by Ridley Scott
- "White Squall" (song), a 1984 song by Stan Rogers
