= Gap year =

Year-long break from education

A gap year, also known as a sabbatical year, is a period of time when students take a break from their studies, usually after completing high school or before beginning graduate school. During this time, students engage in a variety of educational and developmental activities, such as traveling, working, volunteering, or taking courses. Gap years are not limited to a year-long break and can range from several months to a few years.

The activities undertaken during a gap year vary widely and depend on the individual's interests and goals. Some students may take courses to improve their academic skills in areas such as math or language studies, while others may learn a trade, pursue art, or participate in sports. Volunteer work is also a popular choice, as it allows students to give back to their communities and gain valuable experience. Students may also choose to work to save up money, either to fund their gap year activities or to prepare for future educational and personal expenses.

Research suggests that students who take a gap year tend to perform better academically than those who do not. However, some parents may worry that their children will continue deferring their education, rather than resuming studies at the end of the initially planned period.

== Description ==
A gap year is described as "a semester or year of experiential learning, typically taken after high school, and prior to career or post-secondary education, in order to deepen one's practical, professional, and personal awareness." During this time, students engage in various educational, work-related, and developmental activities such as internships, work experience, travel, volunteering, participation in cultural exchanges, studying art or learning a trade, etc. Though gap years come in many different formats – from structured programs to personal exploration – the purpose of taking a gap year is usually founded on the common needs of young people to gain deeper self-understanding, expand their worldview, and recharge between traditional academic experiences. On the other hand, rejected college or employment applications have also caused high school students to pursue a gap year.

Taking a gap year can have significant benefits to one's academic path as well as a career trajectory. This time taken off can help college students from “burning out” or turning to indulgent behaviors as a result of unhealthy stress. During this year, students can explore different interests while gaining experience and maturity before beginning college. It gives young people the time to make an informed choice about the path they wish to pursue, as well as the experience of real-world situations to match academic theories. Gap years and similar sabbatical experiences are popular around the world (as can be evidenced below per country), but are just beginning to become more popular in the United States. Studies conducted by American colleges are showing that the average GPA for students who have taken a gap year is significantly higher than the average GPA for students who have not. Amidst much evidence supporting the positive outcomes of taking a gap year, the room for improvement remains – as the gap year experience is largely geared primarily toward students with “means.” Some still argue an opposing view, as parents are among the concerned that taking a year off from school has the potential to break a student's focus and derail their path rather than recharge it. Ultimately though, the idea of a gap year is growing as it helps students gain the independence necessary for a smoother transition into adulthood.

== History ==
Gap years first became common in the 1960s when the young, baby boom generation, wanted to get away from the severity of war from the silent generation. At first, the primary purpose of the gap year was for countries to exchange cultural ideals in the hope of preventing future wars. The outcome of this exchange was the growth of the gap year industry.

The introduction of gap-year companies in the 1960s and 1970s started the gap-year industry. With the long-term success of organizations like Topdeck, Flight Centre, and Raleigh International, the gap year industry developed rapidly. In 1967, Nicholas Maclean-Bristol created Project Trust, which sent three volunteers to Ethiopia from the UK. The goal of this was to help the nation develop, but also build the volunteers' own skills. In 1972, Gap Activity Projects (now Lattitude Global Volunteering) was started to send UK youth around the world on Gap Year experiences. Their participants, still called "Gappers", went a long way to branding the year between high school and university as a Gap Year. In 1973, Graham Turner innovated the gap year industry by purchasing a bus and selling tickets to Kathmandu. This led to Turner creating Topdeck and Flight Centre, which are successful gap-year companies today. In 1978, the Prince of Wales and Colonel John Blashford-Snell began Operation Drake which is now known as Raleigh International, an expedition voyage around the world following Sir Francis Drake's route.

In 1969, the first gap year organization was founded in Worcester, Massachusetts. The organization called Dynamy was founded with the intention of teaching young people self-confidence and the role they play in a large community. In the 1980s, the gap year idea was promoted by Cornelius H. Bull in the United States to allow students more time for individual growth. Cornelius saw that students needed a bridge between high school and college that would help develop more hands-on skills. To do this, he founded the Center for Interim Programs in 1980 which had goals of increasing self-awareness and developing new cultural perspectives.

The modern Gap Year pioneers came in the form of Peter Pedrick and Tom Griffiths who brought the gap year market onto the web in 1998 with the launch of gapyear.com. They created one of the first social media websites and actively promoted the concept in newspapers, radio and TV interviews using collected data and statistics. They wrote books, launched Gap Year magazine (published between 2002 and 2012) and invented products, offerings, phrases and concepts that form the skeleton of the international gap year industry seen today.

== By country ==
=== Australia and New Zealand ===
Australians and New Zealanders have a tradition of traveling overseas independently at a young age. In New Zealand, this is known as "doing an OE" (Overseas experience). Sometimes this is limited to one year, but at times Australians and New Zealanders will remain overseas for longer, many working short-term in service industry jobs to fund their travels. Europe and Asia are popular destinations for gap year travels. In Australia, exchange programs and youth benefits provide many opportunities for young people to gain experience through travel in a gap year. The Gap Year Association provided approximately four million dollars in 2016 in the form of scholarships and need-based grants.

=== Denmark ===
In Denmark, during the late 1990s, the percentage of students continuing their education directly after high school was down to 25%. Along with this drop, there was a rise in the number of students enrolling and graduating within ten years of finishing high school. Data also shows that women in Denmark take more gap years than men. In 2018, a record low of 15% of that year's high school graduates had chosen to continue their education directly after graduation.

Denmark has sought to limit the number of students who take a year out, penalizing students who delay their education to travel abroad or work full-time. In 2006, it was announced that fewer students than before had taken a year out. In April 2009, the Danish government proposed a new law that gives a bonus to students who refrain from a year out.

=== Ghana ===
In Ghana, most senior high school leavers have a year out from August to the August of the following year, although this is not mandatory.

=== Ireland ===
Transition Year in Ireland is for school students, after taking the Junior Certificate (i.e. typically aged 15–16). It is usually optional and focuses on non-academic subjects.

=== Israel ===
In Israel, it is customary for young adults who have completed their mandatory military service to engage in backpacker tourism abroad in groups before starting university or full-time work (Hebrew: טיול אחרי צבא, lit. 'post-army trip').

Israel has also become a popular gap year travel destination for thousands of young Jewish adults from abroad each year. There are over 10,000 participants in the Masa Israel Journey gap year annually.

=== Japan ===
The employment practice known as simultaneous recruiting of new graduates matches students with jobs before graduation, meaning sabbaticals are highly unusual in Japan.

While unusual, gap years in Japan are not completely unheard of. Some students will take a gap year or two to readjust or reassess their career path or school of choice if not accepted into the school they had originally hoped for.

=== Nigeria ===
While waiting for their JAMB result after secondary school, Nigerian youths usually learn a trade or skill or enrol in another academic program (remedial, pre-degree, JUPEB, A-levels, IJMB, etc.) to increase their chances of getting into a university. Some students also use this opportunity to write their SAT and ACT exams and gain admission into schools abroad.

=== Norway ===
It is quite normal in Norway to have a gap year between high school and further education or a job. Some join the military as part of the compulsory military service, some take part in Folkehøyskole (Folk high school) and some are combining work (typically work that requires no formal education, such as cashiers and waiters) with traveling or volunteer work. It is also fairly common to study a language in another country, for instance, Spain, France, or Australia.

=== Romania and Bulgaria ===
Similar to the way that some students travel during a gap year, many Romanian and Bulgarian students instead study abroad and in recent years the number of students who choose to do this has been growing.

=== South Africa ===
In the Republic of South Africa, taking a year off is common for those in more affluent classes. Those who leave school often travel abroad to gain life experience. It is not uncommon for gap year students to travel to Cape Town for life experience. Common volunteer opportunities include working in animal welfare or tree planting.

=== United Kingdom ===
In the United Kingdom, the practice of taking a gap year – seen as an interim period of 7 or 8 months between completing secondary education and starting university – began to develop in the 1970s. The period was seen as a time for gaining life experience through travel or volunteering. Universities appear to welcome post-gap-year applicants on the same basis as those going straight to university from previous education.

Shorter gap-style experiences (volunteering, expeditions, courses, and work placements) are gaining in popularity, as they can be taken without the need to take a full year out of study or work, due to the recent overhaul of the benefit system as well as the rollout of Universal Credit, which includes tougher conditionality rules resulting into people making limited decisions on the length of gap years due to the emphasis on employment.

A kind of a gap year after university graduation in the UK was short-term voluntary military service as a commissioned officer: Short Service Limited Commission was introduced at the end of the 1970s when many units were short of young officers. In 1999 the name was changed to Gap Year Commission. It was discontinued in 2007.

=== United States ===
In the United States, the practice of taking a "year off" remains the exception, but is gaining in popularity. Parents are starting to encourage their high school graduates to take a gap year to focus on service opportunities. Schools are also beginning to support gap years more; most notably Harvard University and Princeton University, are now encouraging students to take time off, and some have even built gap year-like programs into the curriculum, and many high schools now have counselors specifically for students interested in taking a gap year.

Taking a year off has recently become slightly more common for Americans, the main reason is that students often feel burnt out with schooling and want to take time to make sure their lives are headed in a direction that suits them. Some 40,000 Americans participated in 2013 in sabbatical programs, an increase of almost 20% since 2006, according to statistics compiled by the American Gap Association. Universities such as Georgetown University, New York University, Amherst College, Princeton University, Harvard University, Massachusetts Institute of Technology, Middlebury College, Davidson College, Yeshiva University, and Reed College have formal policies allowing students to defer admission.

Tufts University offers a program called 1+4 which allows students from lower income-families to volunteer abroad or within America for a period of one year before starting their bachelor's degree. Naropa University in Boulder, Colorado, is the first U.S. university to fully integrate the gap year into a four-year undergraduate degree, which makes financial aid directly available to any student considering a gap year.

Some formal gap year programs can cost as much as $30,000, but cheaper alternatives are becoming more widely available; some reduce costs by offering room and board. For example, the National Civilian Community Corps, an AmeriCorps program, offers 18- to 24-year-olds (no age limit for Team Leaders) an all-expense-paid gap year (room & board, meals, transportation, etc.) in exchange for a 10-month commitment to National and Community service. AmeriCorps NCCC members travel the country in diverse teams and perform a variety of tasks such as rebuilding trails in national parks, responding to natural disasters, or working as mentors for disadvantaged youths. As with most AmeriCorps programs, service members receive an education award of approximately $6,000 upon completion of their service that can be used toward qualified educational expenses or student loans. The zero cost to the member model AmeriCorps offers makes it an attractive alternative to costly gap year programs while leveraging taxpayer dollars to strengthen American communities.

Additionally, new federal partnerships such as FEMA Corps offer traditional gap year seekers an immersive professional and team-building experience that can serve as a launch pad for their careers. Some government programs designed to help students afford college prohibit students from taking a gap year. For example, the Tennessee Promise program requires that students must "Attend full-time and continuously at an eligible postsecondary institution as defined in T.C.A. § 49-4-708 in the fall term immediately following graduation or attainment of a GED or HiSET diploma; except that a student enrolling in a Tennessee College of Applied Technology (TCAT) may enroll in the summer prior to the fall term." Malia Obama, daughter of former President Barack Obama, took a gap year before attending Harvard University in the fall of 2017. Universities such as Harvard and Princeton are encouraging students to take a Gap year. This time that is taken off can be beneficial so students don't "burn out" or partake in indulging behaviors that promote unhealthy stress.

=== Yemen ===
In Yemen, a gap year is mandatory between secondary school (high school) and university. Unless one attends a private university, one must wait one year after secondary school before applying to university. Until the 1990s, it was mandatory for male graduates serve in the army for one year, and to teach in a school or work in a hospital for female graduates (and for men who cannot join the army for health reasons).

== See also ==
- Career break
- Grand Tour
- Gap Yah
- JacksGap
- Wandering journeyman
- Overseas experience
- Postgraduate year, extra year of education after high school and before college
- Sabbatical
- Simultaneous recruiting of new graduates
- Work-life balance
- Working holiday
- Volunteering
