= InterHealth =

- Company type: Charity
- Industry: Health
- Founded: 1989
- Defunct: N/A
- Headquarters: London, UK, Nairobi, Kenya
- Revenue: 712,621 pound sterling (2004)

InterHealth Worldwide was an international charity (registered charity number 1103935) that provided Medical, Psychological, Occupational, and Travel Health services to those working in the International Development, Humanitarian, Mission and Gap Year sectors. The charity was founded on 20 April 1989 at Mildmay Mission Hospital, East London. The charity closed in 2017 due to financial challenges.

InterHealth was based at 63-67 Newington Causeway, London, and had an East Africa regional hub in Nairobi.

InterHealth was regulated by the Care Quality Commission in the UK.

== History ==
InterHealth started as the Missionaries and Volunteers Health Service (MVHS), launched in 1989. Mildmay Hospital Doctors, Veronica Moss and Marjory Foyle, together with nurse-secretary Jane Ryman, initiated MVHS in 1986. Dr Ted Lankester joined the team in 1988, taking over as Director of InterHealth, while Veronica assumed the leadership of Mildmay Hospital.

Marjory Foyle was an expert in the psychological health of missionaries and expatriates, and Veronica had spent several years in India as a Doctor. Ted had just spent eight years in the Himalayas working with vulnerable communities and caring for a variety of international expatriates.

InterHealth closed in both London and Nairobi in August 2017.
