= Alive & Kicking (social enterprise) =

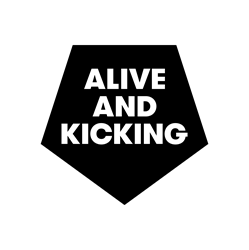
- Company type: Social Enterprise
- Founded: 2004
- Founder: Jim Cogan OBE
- Headquarters: UK
- Number of locations: Kenya, Zambia, Ghana
- Key people: Ben Sadler CEO
- Website: www.aliveandkicking.org

Alive and Kicking is an African social enterprise that manufactures sports balls to provide balls for children, create jobs for adults and promote health education through sport. It states its vision as being of ‘an Africa where every child can play with a real ball, where thousands of jobs are sustained in the production of balls, and where sport contributes to the eradication of deadly disease.’

== History ==
Alive and Kicking was established in 2004 by Jim Cogan OBE and currently operates in Kenya, Zambia and Ghana. Cogan had experience of East African enterprise, having previously set up Student Partnerships Worldwide (now called Restless Development). After UEFA donated 81,000 Alive and Kicking balls across Africa, operations started in Zambia in 2007, using space on Zambeef’s leather site in Lusaka. Following Jim Cogan’s death in September 2007, Alive and Kicking was taken under the stewardship of the then Chairman of Trustees, James Flecker. The enterprise continued to grow and Alive and Kicking South Africa began stitching balls in Wellington, Western Cape in 2008. The South African branch could not establish itself in the market for balls, however, and stopped production in July 2009.

In 2009, it was featured in Bloomberg BusinessWeek as one of the top 3 products that 'might change the world'. In 2010, Alive and Kicking was recognised by The Guardian for its employment opportunities for people with disabilities. When Dan Magness broke the world record for longest distance walked while doing keepie-uppie in 2010, he did so using an Alive and Kicking ball. They received considerable media coverage during the 2010 FIFA World Cup in South Africa from, among others, their trustee Henry Winter. They were back in the news in 2011, criticising Hyundai’s donation of 1 million footballs to Africa as being environmentally unsuitable and undermining local enterprise.

The continued stability of the Kenyan and Zambian operations led to the opening of AandK Ghana in 2012, which aims to utilise the large West African market and ultimately employ 50 people. In August 2012, the launch of Alive and Kicking Ghana was featured by Metro. In September 2012 Alive and Kicking achieved its first retail presence outside of Africa, as its 'Balls For Africa' initiative was launched in John Lewis. In November 2012, it was announced that Manchester City and England defender Micah Richards had become an ambassador for the organisation. In total, Alive and Kicking has produced over 800,000 balls. Alive and Kicking's headquarters are located in London, and it is a registered charity in the UK.
