= Voluntary Service Overseas =

International development charity

VSO
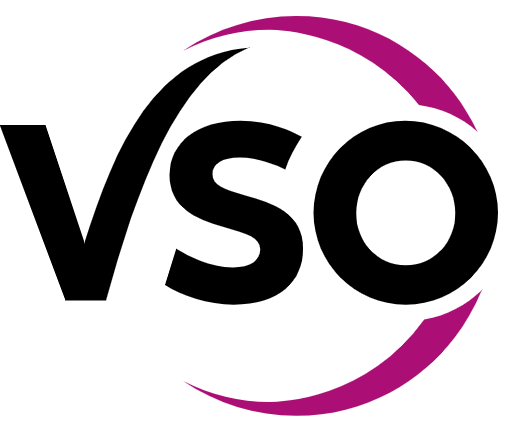
- Formation: 1958
- Founders: Alec and Mora Dickson
- Type: International development charity
- Location: Worldwide
- Volunteers: 80,000
- Website: www.vsointernational.org

VSO is a not-for-profit international development organization charity with a vision for "a fair world for everyone" and a mission to "create lasting change through volunteering". VSO delivers development impact through a blended volunteer model consisting of international, national, and community volunteers working together to develop the systems and conditions for positive social change. In 2022–23, VSO worked in 35 countries in Africa and Asia.

VSO currently works in the following core programme areas:

- Inclusive Education
- Health
- Livelihoods

And through three core approaches that are relevant to all the areas:

- Social Inclusion and Gender
- Social Accountability
- Resilience

In addition, VSO has a youth focus in which young people are both the beneficiaries of social change outcomes as well as the primary actors in creating the change.

== Structure and governance ==
VSO (formerly known as Voluntary Service Overseas) is a company limited by guarantee. VSO operates internationally largely through branch offices. Exceptions to this are:

- Voluntary Service Overseas (Ireland) Limited Company Limited by Guarantee, which is a subsidiary of VSO and incorporated as a charitable entity in Ireland.
- VSO India, which has agreements in place with the independent Indian charitable organisation, VSO India Trust. These agreements permit the Trust to carry out VSO's work using the VSO trademark.
- Stichting VSO Nederland, which is a Dutch independent charitable organisation that has agreements with VSO, including a trademark license, and whose accounts were integrated with VSO's as of April 2018.
- Voluntary Service Overseas USA, Inc., a US 501(c) organisation(iii).

VSO's governing body is the International Board, currently comprising seven trustees. The day-to-day management of VSO is carried out by the executive board, which has operational oversight of VSO's global work. Each Executive Board member is responsible for a function of VSO: People, Programmes, Business Development, and Finance.

== History ==
VSO was founded in 1958 by Alec and Mora Dickson through a bishop's letter to the London paper, The Sunday Times, as an educational experience overseas for school-leavers, initially only male, before starting university. Volunteers offered unskilled help in return for basic accommodation and pocket money. In 1962, the practice changed to using university graduate volunteers.

By 1980, the unskilled volunteers had been completely phased out and the length of service had been extended to two years. Active volunteer numbers initially dropped to about 750, but by 2003 had returned to about 1,400. Since December 2004, applications to volunteer have been accepted from those between ages 20 and 75, who also must have at least two years' experience in their field.

In the early 1990s, in order to meet growing demand for highly specialised and skilled volunteers from its partners in developing countries, VSO established partner agencies in Canada, the Netherlands, Kenya/Uganda (VSO Jitolee), and the Philippines (VSO Bahaginan). In 2004, VSO launched a partnership called iVolunteer Overseas (iVO) in India with iVolunteer, an existing volunteering program of MITRA, an Indian NGO. VSO's structure evolved to become an international federation which now includes Ireland, China and India as well as the above named countries. International volunteers are recruited through all of these bases, and they can be placed in any one of VSO's programmes (e.g. an Irish volunteer working in Nepal, or a Ugandan volunteer working in Tajikistan).

From 2011, VSO led a consortium to deliver the UK government's International Citizen Service programme that provides international volunteer placements for 18- to 25-year-olds. The programme, funded by the Department for International Development (DFID), now includes Raleigh International and Restless Development. In 2016/17, 3,090 young people volunteered through the International Citizen Service programme.

In 2017, VSO was awarded a grant of £50 million from the UK's Department of International Development (DFID) for a program called "Volunteering for Development". The three-year initiative aims to improve quality and access to health and education services as well as livelihood opportunities for the most poor and vulnerable, and targets more than 2 million of the poorest and most marginalised people across the globe. The grant supports VSO's vision to enhance effectiveness across a number of vital areas - including in VSO's "core approaches" of social inclusion and gender, social accountability, and resilience. During its first year the project successfully placed 606 international volunteers and 920 national volunteers across VSO's four areas of focus.

== Today ==
Highlights of VSO today include:

- VSO supports the delivery of integrated, large-scale education, health and livelihoods programmes in a range of countries. Its programmes reached over 3.5 million people directly in 2022/23
- VSO now works in post-crisis situations and has recently responded to disasters in Bangladesh, Nepal, the Philippines and Sierra Leone. Most recently it has supported the establishment of a home-based early childhood care and education (ECCE) in emergencies to support refugee Rohingya communities in Bangladesh
- It supports communities and governments to inform and influence policy dialogues. It recently supported the development of the Africa Union Gender Strategy and the Kenya Special Education Needs Policy.
- In Nepal, VSO has been awarded nearly £10 million for inclusive education work through the UK's Girls' Education Challenge, the world's largest education challenge fund, which targets support for adolescent girls. In its first phase the project Sisters for Sisters' Education introduced to Nepal the first ever peer-based mentoring programme for marginalised girls.
- Citizen Led Monitoring is now a key element of VSOs work. In 2017/18 over 20,000 people in Nepal and Uganda were mobilized for awareness raising and accountability on the delivery of the sustainable development goals
- VSO is supporting the creation of national youth platforms in seven of its countries of operation
- It is playing a leading part in the development of a global standard for responsible and impactful volunteering as part of the Forum for International Volunteering in Development.

=== Partnerships ===
VSO works with local partners in the communities they work with, placing volunteers with these partners to help increase their impact and effectiveness. VSO also has corporate partnerships and sponsors.

== See also ==
- CUSO
- Doctors Without Borders
- EU Aid Volunteers
- European Voluntary Service
- Fredskorpset
- Peace Corps
- United Nations Volunteers
