= International Citizen Service =

International Citizen Service (ICS) is a global volunteering programme. It is aimed at young people aged 18-35 and supports them on 12-week long sustainable and locally owned volunteering placements focused on working towards the Sustainable Development Goals.

ICS works with projects that have specifically requested help, with emphasis placed on measures that combat poverty. Funded by the Department for International Development, ICS is led by VSO, in partnership with a number of development organisations.

Prime Minister David Cameron has said the program was inspired by the Peace Corps. The forerunner programme to ICS was Platform2, which was initiated under the previous Labour government.

ICS and ICS Entrepreneur are led by VSO in partnership with a group of development organisations.

Volunteers to the ICS are asked to fundraise, and receive support to help them meet their fundraising goals.

The programme has been on pause since the Covid-19 pandemic.

== ICS consortium ==
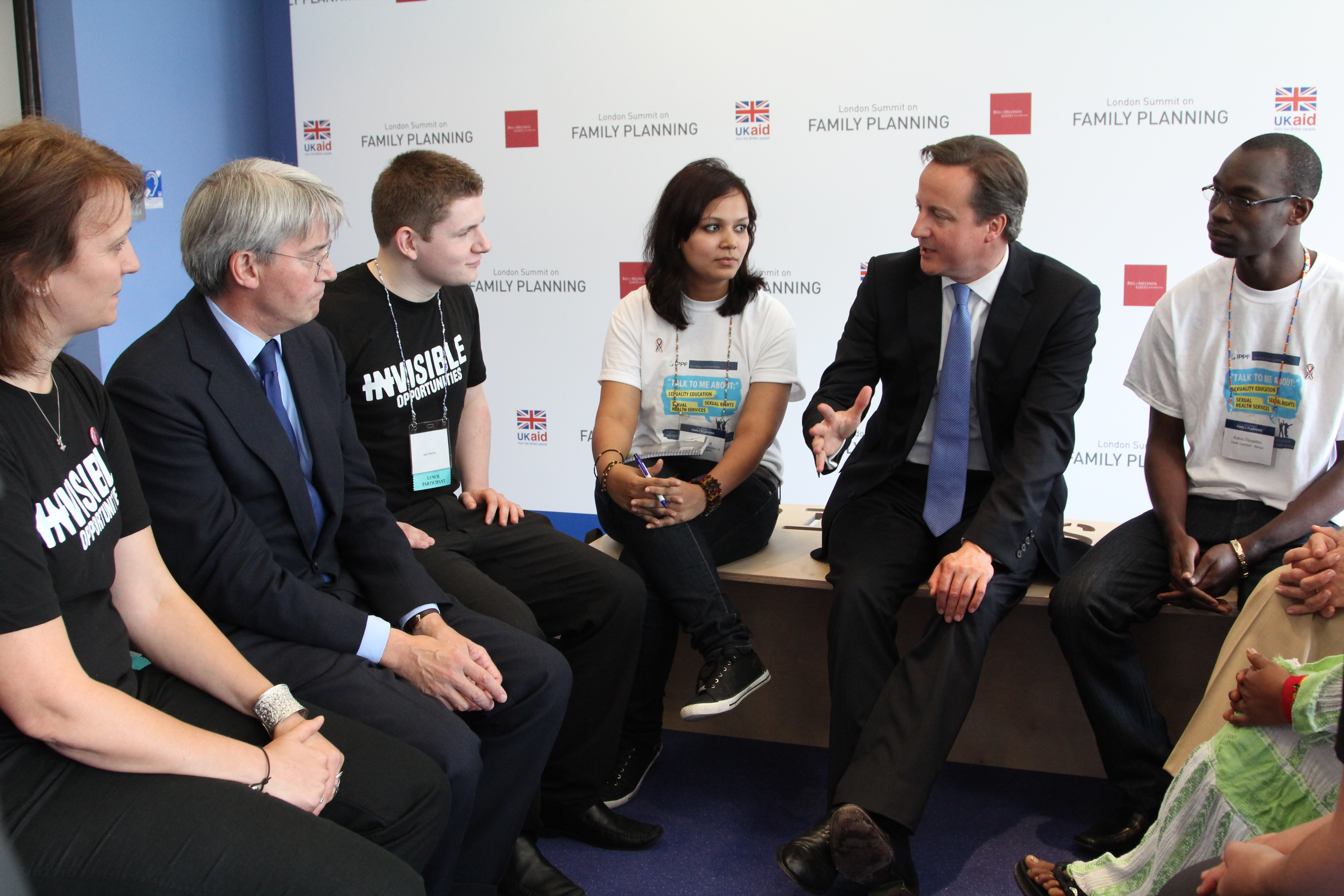
David Cameron and Andrew Mitchell speaking with young International Citizen Service volunteers

The ICS consortium are a group of organisations that aim to use their experience in running overseas volunteer programmes to work towards the Sustainable Development Goals. Collectively, the ICS agencies work directly with around 3000 international volunteers every year and have partnerships in over 60 countries. While a number of agencies ran volunteer programmes as part of ICS by 2020, only three agencies were still part of the consortium; Raleigh International, VSO and Restless Development.

== Criticisms ==
The International Citizen Service was criticized for a lack of value and basically providing holidays on taxpayers expense. Questions have been raised as to whether the cost of £7,633 per volunteer for the flights, visas, accommodation, food, insurance, a certain amount of living expenses and training of young people offers good value for money. The same report showed however that those volunteers raised £2.148 million to support the programmes during that period which covered the majority of that cost.
