= Albatross (1920 schooner) =

1920 sailing ship famous for sinking

History
- Refit: In 1954 as a Brigantine
- Fate: Sunk in a white squall, 125 mi (201 km) west of the Dry Tortugas in 1961

General characteristics
- Tonnage: 93 GRT
- Length: 82.8 ft (25.2 m)
- Beam: 20.8 ft (6.3 m)
- Draft: 9.8 ft (3.0 m)
- Propulsion: 1 screw
- Complement: 19

Albatross, originally named Albatros, later Alk, was a sailing ship that became famous when she sank in 1961 with a group of American teenagers on board. The events were the basis for 1996 film White Squall.

== Early history ==
The Albatross was built as Albatros, a schooner, at the state shipyard (Rijkswerf) in Amsterdam, Netherlands, in 1920, to serve as a pilot boat (named Alk) in the North Sea. The ship spent two decades working the North Sea before being purchased by the German government in 1937. She served as a radio-station ship for submarines during the Second World War. In 1949, Royal Rotterdam Lloyd bought her for use as a training ship for future officers of their company (Dutch merchant marine). The fact that she was small made her ideal for this kind of work, and the dozen trainees could receive personal attention from the six or so professional crew. While under Dutch ownership, she sailed the North Sea extensively, with occasional voyages as far as Spain and Portugal.

The American aviator, filmmaker and novelist Ernest K. Gann purchased the Albatros in 1954, re-rigged her as a brigantine, and she cruised the Pacific for three years. According to Charles Gieg (The Last Voyage of the Albatros), the Albatros survived a tsunami in Hawaii during this time. She was also used in the 1958 film Twilight for the Gods (starring Rock Hudson and Arthur Kennedy), whose script and the underlying novel by the same title were written by the Albatros' owner Gann.

== Albatross at the "Ocean Academy" and loss ==
In 1959, Christopher B. Sheldon's Ocean Academy, Ltd., of Darien, Connecticut, acquired the ship to use for trips combining preparatory college classes and sail training. Over the next three years, Christopher B. Sheldon, Ph.D., and his wife, Alice Strahan Sheldon, M.D., ran programs for up to fourteen students in the Caribbean and Eastern Pacific Ocean.

From fall 1960 to spring 1961, a crew of four instructors (including the Sheldons), a cook, George Ptacnik, and 13 students sailed the Albatross from the Bahamas through the Caribbean to the Galápagos Islands and back to the Caribbean; a fourteenth student had been on the ship for the first part of the voyage, but had left in Balboa, Panama. At the beginning of May, the Albatross was en route from Progreso, Mexico, to Nassau, the Bahamas. On 1 May, skipper Sheldon decided that they would make a stop at one of the Florida Keys to refuel.

Shortly after 8:30 am on 2 May 1961 the Albatross was hit by a sudden squall about 125 miles (200 km) west of the Dry Tortugas. She heeled over suddenly and sank almost instantly, taking with her Alice Sheldon, the ship's cook George Ptacnik, and students Chris Coristine, John Goodlett, Rick Marsellus, and Robin Wetherill (John Goodlett was on deck in the last minutes, but probably became entangled in some of the lines or a sail of the sinking ship while freeing a lifeboat, and Christopher Coristine reportedly went below deck in an attempt to save someone else). As there had not been time to send out a radio distress signal before she was lost, the remaining crew used her two lifeboats to make way towards Florida. Around 7:30 a.m. on 3 May, the two boats were found by the Dutch freighter Gran Rio, which took the survivors to Tampa, Florida.

According to Sheldon, the squall hitting the Albatross was a white squall, i.e. an unpredictably sudden, very strong squall. His opinion was that the Albatross was essentially a stable, "safe" ship, and that the crew of teenagers—who had already spent about eight months on board—were sufficiently trained, but that this rare weather phenomenon left the ship no chance. Critics of this view, however, have argued that refittings of the Albatross over the years by her various owners had made her top heavy, which affected her secondary stability, that is, her ability to remain stable or even right herself after tilting to the side, as opposed to capsizing. In her times as North Sea pilot schooner, the ship had had a far smaller and lower sail area, which means that the force of the wind did not have as much power and as powerful an angle as it did the day she sank. Almost 40 years after the loss of the Albatross, Daniel S. Parrott reanalyzed some of the documents about the ship and comparable ships in his book, Tall Ships Down. He suggested that due to the ship's impaired stability, even a "normal" squall could have sunk her; according to him, only the expert handling of the ship and the habitual prudence of the ship's captain(s) to reduce sail area early had prevented the refitted Albatross from capsizing in previous strong wind conditions.

In 1932, the German sail training ship Niobe suffered a similar fate, killing 69. Parrott draws parallels to the sudden losses of the Marques (1984) and the original Pride of Baltimore (1986), which were similarly affected by large sail areas; in the case of the Marques, this was likewise the result of refittings over the years of her existence.

== Aftermath ==
The loss of the Albatross prompted the United States Coast Guard to undertake a thorough review of the instantaneous stability—i.e. the ability of ships to remain upright—and design requirements for sailing school ships. The new rules were codified in the Sailing School Vessels Act of 1982.

Narrations of the last voyage of the Albatross were published by two of the survivors: Charles Gieg, who had been one of the students on board the ship, and Richard Langford, who had been the English instructor.

The 1996 film White Squall, starring Jeff Bridges and directed by Ridley Scott, presents a fictionalized version of the ship's loss.

After the loss of the Albatross, Sheldon worked for the Peace Corps and briefly started another sailing school. He never remarried and died on October 5, 2002, of pancreatic cancer, in Stamford, Connecticut. He was 76.
