= White Squall (film) =

1996 film by Ridley Scott

- Theatrical release poster
- Directed by: Ridley Scott
- Screenplay by: Todd Robinson
- Produced by: Mimi Polk Gitlin; Rocky Lang
- Starring: Jeff Bridges; Caroline Goodall; John Savage; Scott Wolf; Balthazar Getty
- Cinematography: Hugh Johnson
- Edited by: Gerry Hambling
- Music by: Jeff Rona
- Production companies: Hollywood Pictures; Largo Entertainment; Scott Free Productions
- Distributed by: Buena Vista Pictures Distribution (United States and Canada); Largo Entertainment (International)
- Release date: February 2, 1996
- Running time: 129 minutes
- Country: United States
- Language: English
- Budget: $38 million
- Box office: $10.3 million (United States)

White Squall is a 1996 American disaster survival film directed by Ridley Scott. It is a coming of age film in which a group of high-school and college-aged teenagers sign up for several months of training aboard a brigantine and travel around half the globe when suddenly they are challenged by a severe storm. The film stars Jeff Bridges, Caroline Goodall, John Savage, Scott Wolf, Jeremy Sisto and Balthazar Getty.

White Squall was released on February 2, 1996 by Buena Vista Pictures Distribution in the United States and Canada and by Largo Entertainment in other territories. The film received mixed to positive reviews from critics but was a box office bomb, grossing only $10.3 million in the United States against a $38 million budget.

== Plot ==
The film is based on the fate of the brigantine Albatross, which sank May 2, 1961, allegedly because of a white squall. The film relates the ill-fated school sailing trip led by Dr. Christopher B. Sheldon, whom the boys call "Skipper". He is tough and teaches them discipline. He forms a close connection with well-off Chuck Gieg, troubled rich kid Frank Beaumont, shy Gil Martin and bad boy Dean Preston. On the first days, it is discovered that Gil suffers from acrophobia when he fails to aid the choking Chuck who becomes entangled after slipping from a mast. He is instead saved by Skipper Sheldon while Gil is ordered to climb the ropes, something he ultimately cannot do, and is therefore assigned limited duty on board.

Frank's snobby attitude causes him to bump heads with most of the boys. Gil opens up to Chuck about his troubled home life one night in their bunks, which Frank listens to and identifies with as well.

After many misadventures on land and on the boat, the boys begin to take Skipper's teachings seriously and act like real shipmates, forming stronger bonds.

Eventually, the brigantine goes into shore and the boys take leave on land. Frank's wealthy father and mother give him a surprise visit while the crew is in port. Frank is upset by the poor timing of the visit, as he becomes separated from the boys and their festivities when his overbearing parents require him to go out to a steak dinner with them. The father and son end up in a fist fight and become further estranged. Frank drinks and goes to the party, only to be escorted out by Chuck, Gil and Dean.

After a night of festivities, the crew set out to sea again on the next day. When the brigantine encounters a school of dolphins, Frank, still angry at his father, vents his fury by shooting one of the dolphins with a harpoon. Skipper demands Frank at least put the animal out of its misery, but he can't bring himself to, so Skipper kills it, then tells Frank he's been expelled from the program and puts him ashore at the next port. The day he leaves, Frank apologizes to Skipper for the incident on the boat and is given a farewell by Gil, who gets the courage to climb up the ropes to ring the bell for Frank, which symbolizes ‘Where we go one, we go all.’

Soon after, while at sea, the brigantine encounters a freakish white squall storm. The vessel is battered by the seas, and the boys try to use what the Skipper has taught them in order to survive the horrific ordeal. Most of them succeed in abandoning the vessel, but Gil, Dean, Skipper's wife Alice, and the cook Girard Pascal all drown.

When the survivors are rescued and reach land, Skipper is put on trial, with Frank's powerful parents leading the call for his license to be revoked. Eventually, Skipper refuses to allow anyone else to be blamed for the disaster, and accepts responsibility, but his former students all stand up for him. Frank turns against his bullying parents to support the Skipper, as all of the boys embrace him. The end credits explain that in reality six people died in total (four students) and dedicates the film to them.

== Cast ==
- Jeff Bridges as Captain Christopher "Skipper" Sheldon
- Caroline Goodall as Alice Sheldon
- John Savage as McCrea
- Scott Wolf as Chuck Gieg
- Jeremy Sisto as Frank Beaumont
- Ryan Phillippe as Gil Martin
- Eric Michael Cole as Dean Preston
- Balthazar Getty as Tod Johnstone
- Jason Marsden as Shay Jennings
- David Lascher as Robert March
- Ethan Embry as Tracy Lapchick
- Julio Mechoso as Girard Pascal
- David Selby as Francis Beaumont
- Jordan Clarke as Charles Gieg Sr.
- James Medina as Cuban Commander
- Željko Ivanek as Captain Sanders
- James Rebhorn as Captain Tyler
- Jill Larson as Peggy Beaumont
- Lizbeth MacKay as Middy Gieg
- Ray De-Haan as Stunt Performer

== Production ==
Part of the film was shot using a horizon tank in Malta, with a full-sized mock-up of the ship, the Eye of the Wind, used to depict the Albatross in scenes shot mainly in the Caribbean, on islands such as St. Vincent and the Grenadines. Maurice Jarre was originally scheduled to compose the original score, but was replaced by Hans Zimmer's protégé Jeff Rona. Zimmer was set to replace Jarre but failed to commit due to time difficulties. The song in the end credits is "Valparaiso" by Sting.

== Reception ==
On Rotten Tomatoes the film has an approval rating of 57% based on 37 reviews. The site's consensus states: "Though it gets occasionally bogged down by touchy-feely sentiment, White Squall benefits greatly from Jeff Bridges' assured lead performance and Ridley Scott's visceral, exciting direction". Metacritic, which uses a weighted average, assigned the film a score of 53 out of 100, based on 21 critics, indicating "mixed or average" reviews. White Squall, like Scott's previous film, 1492: Conquest of Paradise, was a box office disappointment.

Audiences polled by CinemaScore gave the film an average grade of "A−" on an A+ to F scale.

Roger Ebert gave it three stars. In his review he said "I enjoyed the movie for the sheer physical exuberance of its adventure."

Decades after White Squall's release, believers in the QAnon conspiracy theory have developed an affinity for the film because its original trailer emphasizes several phrases ("Where we go one, we go all," "Anonymous," and "The calm before the storm") which feature prominently in the conspiracy's lore.

== Home media ==
The film was released on VHS on August 13, 1996, on LaserDisc on November 9, 1996, and on DVD on June 22, 1999.
