= Think Global (charity) =

British charitable organization

Think Global (formal name Development Education Association, also known as DEA) is a British charity which "works to educate and engage people about global issues". It was founded in 1993 by a group of major charities including CAFOD, Oxfam, ActionAid, Save the Children and Christian Aid, and evolved from NADEC, the National Association for Development Education Centres; in January 2011 it adopted the "working name" Think Global to reflect a broadening of its interests.

== See also ==
- Restless Development
