= Henry Winter =

Journalist

- Born: 18 February 1963 (age 63)
- Education: University of Edinburgh
- Occupation: Sports Journalist
- Years active: 1986–present
- Employer: World Soccer
- Awards: Football Journalist, Specialist Correspondent of the Year, British Sports Journalism Awards

Henry Winter (born 18 February 1963) is an English sports journalist. He currently writes for World Soccer, having previously been the Chief Football Writer for The Times and a Football Correspondent for The Daily Telegraph.

== Education ==
Winter was educated at Westminster School, before graduating from the University of Edinburgh in 1986.

== Career ==
Winter spent a year producing a magazine on sport in London after graduation an working at Sports News Agency, Hayters, before joining The Independent at its launch in 1986, writing a sports and schools column.

He moved to The Daily Telegraph in 1994, and produced a daily webcast on the 2006 FIFA World Cup in Germany, giving specific information on the England team. He joined The Times in 2015 to become Chief Football Writer.

Over the course of his career, Winter wrote FA Confidential with former FA chief executive David Davies, and ghost-wrote the autobiographies of Liverpool F.C. players Kenny Dalglish, John Barnes and Steven Gerrard. He wrote Fifty Years of Hurt: The Story of England Football in 2017.

He also makes regular appearances as a pundit on Sky Sports' Sunday Supplement and BBC Radio 5 Live.

Winter revealed on 10 April 2024 that he would be leaving The Times after being made redundant. On 11 June 2024 it was announced that Winter would become a columnist for World Soccer.

== Awards ==
Winter was named Specialist Correspondent of the Year at the British Sports Journalism Awards in 2004, 2009, 2010 and 2013, and Football Writer of the Year in 2016. In 2010, he was named among the top 10 most influential sportswriters in Britain by the trade publication, Press Gazette.

== Personal life ==
Winter's older brother is Islamic scholar Timothy Winter. He is a trustee of the African social enterprise Alive & Kicking, which manufactures footballs in Kenya and Zambia.
