= SS Theresia L M Russ =

Cargo ship

History
- Name: Theresia L M Russ (1927–1945); Empire Concrete (1945–1946); Velsen (1946–1947); Cronenburgh (1947–1955); Astor (1955–1970)
- Owner: Ernst Russ (1927–1940); Kriegsmarine (1940); Ernst Russ (1940); Kriegsmarine (1940–1942); Ernst Russ (1942–1945); Ministry of War Transport (1945); Ministry of Transport (1945–1946); Dutch Government (1946–1947); Wm Müller & Co (1947–1955); U Gennari & Co (1955–1970)
- Operator: Ernst Russ (1927–1940); Kriegsmarine (1940); Ernst Russ (1940); Kriegsmarine (1940–1942); Ernst Russ (1942–1945); Stockwood, Rees & Co Ltd (1945–1946); Wm Müller & Co (1946–1955); Compania de Navigation Caribbean Cargo Carriers SA (1955–1970)
- Port of registry: (Weimar Republic) Hamburg (1927–1933); (Nazi Germany) Hamburg (1933–1940); (Nazi Germany) Kriegsmarine (1940); (Nazi Germany) Hamburg (1940); (Nazi Germany) Kriegsmarine (1940–1942); (Nazi Germany) Hamburg (1942–1945); (United Kingdom) London (1945–1946); (Netherlands) 's-Gravenhage (1946–1947); (Netherlands) Rotterdam (1947–1955); Panama City (1955–1970)
- Builder: Neptun AG
- Yard number: 413
- Launched: 1927
- Maiden voyage: 20 December 1927
- Identification: Code Letters RGNK (1927–1934); Code Letters DHXN (1933–1945); Code Letters GLOL (1945–1946); Code Letters PDMW (1947–1955); United Kingdom Official Number 180708 (1945–1946); IMO Number 5102755 ( –1970)
- Fate: Scrapped

General characteristics
- Type: Cargo ship
- Tonnage: 1,694 GRT; 993 NRT; 2,658 DWT
- Length: 257 ft 7 in (78.51 m)
- Beam: 41 ft 8 in (12.70 m)
- Depth: 16 ft 3 in (4.95 m)
- Installed power: Triple expansion steam engine
- Propulsion: Screw propeller
- Speed: 9.5 knots (17.6 km/h)

Theresia L M Russ was a 1,694 GRT cargo ship that was built in 1927 by Neptun AG of Rostock, Germany for Ernst Russ. She was requisitioned by the Kriegsmarine for two years during the Second World War. In 1944, she was sunk by bombing at Gotenhafen in German-occupied Poland. The ship was raised and repaired in 1945. She was seized by the Allies at Copenhagen and passed to the Ministry of War Transport (MoWT) and renamed Empire Concrete.

In 1946, she was passed to the Dutch government and renamed Velsen. She was sold into merchant service in 1947 and renamed Cronenburgh. In 1955, she was sold to Italy and renamed Astor under Panamanian management. She served until scrapped in 1970.

== Description ==
The ship was built in 1927 by Neptun AG, Rostock, as yard number 413.

The ship was 257 feet 7 inches (78.51 m) long, with a beam of 41 feet 8 inches (12.70 m) a depth of 16 feet 3 inches (4.95 m). She had a GRT of 1,6964 and a NRT of 993. Her DWT was 2,658.

The ship was propelled by a triple expansion steam engine, which had two cylinders of 19 5/16 inches (49.1 cm), 31 1/2 inches (80 cm) and 51 3/16 inches (130.0 cm) diameter by 35 7/16 inches (90.0 cm) stroke. The engine was built by AG Neptun. The engine was supplied with steam from two boilers with a total heating area of 454 square metres (4,890 sq ft), operating at 14 standard atmospheres (210 psi). The engine could propel her at 9.5 knots (17.6 km/h).

== History ==
Theresia L M Russ was built for Ernst Russ, Hamburg. The Code Letters RGNK were allocated. She made her maiden voyage on 20 December 1927. On 26 July 1932, Theresa L M Russ rescued the 40 survivors from the Reichsmarine training schooner Niobe, which had capsized off Fehmarn in a squall. In 1934, her Code Letters were changed to DHXN. On 14 August 1938, the French steamship Artois struck a mine and sank 35 nautical miles (65 km) south east of Gibraltar. Theresia L M Russ rescued her crew of 14, who had taken to the lifeboats. They were landed at Gibraltar. On 9 April 1940, Theresia L M Russ was requisitioned at Bergen, Norway by the Kriegsmarine. She was returned to Ernst Russ on 29 April. On 15 August 1940, she was again requisitioned by the Kriegsmarine. On 9 December 1941, Theresia L M Russ was one of seven ships in a convoy travelling from Kirkenes, Norway to Tromsø, Norway when the convoy was attacked by German submarine U-134 (1941) and SS Steinbek was sunk. Theresia L M Russ was returned to her owners on 23 May 1942. She was damaged in an air raid on 26 February 1944 at Helsinki, Finland. On 18 December 1944, Theresia L M Russ was sunk in a Royal Air Force raid on Gotenhafen, German-occupied Poland. On 13 January 1945, she entered dry dock for repairs.

Theresia L M Russ was seized by the Allies in May 1945 at Flensburg. She arrived at Methil, Fife on 4 July 1945. Theresia L M Russ was passed to the MoWT and renamed Empire Concrete. Her port of registry was London. The Code Letter GLOL and United Kingdom Official Number 180708 were allocated. She was operated under the management of Stockwood, Rees & Co Ltd. On 25 October 1946, Empire Concrete was transferred to the Dutch Government and renamed Velsen. She was placed under the management of Wm Müller & Co NV, Rotterdam.

On 9 February 1947, Velsen was sold to Müllers and renamed Cronenburgh. Her port of registry was changed to Rotterdam and the Code Letters PDMW were allocated. On 20 July 1948, Cronenburgh grounded on a voyage between Stockholm and Mäntyluoto, Finland. It was subsequently discovered that she was leaking and she was drydocked for repairs.

In 1955, Cronenburgh was sold to U Gennari & Co, Italy. She was operated under the management of Compania de Navigation Caribbean Cargo Carriers SA, Panama and was renamed Astor. When IMO Numbers were introduced, Astor was allocated number 5102755. On 15 February 1970, Astor was on a voyage from Algiers to Oran when she suffered damage to her boilers. She was sold on 9 March 1970 to Industry Varie SJV, La Spezia, Italy and arrived there under tow. Scrapping commenced on 23 March 1970.
