= Niobe (schooner) =

Training schooner of the Reichsmarine

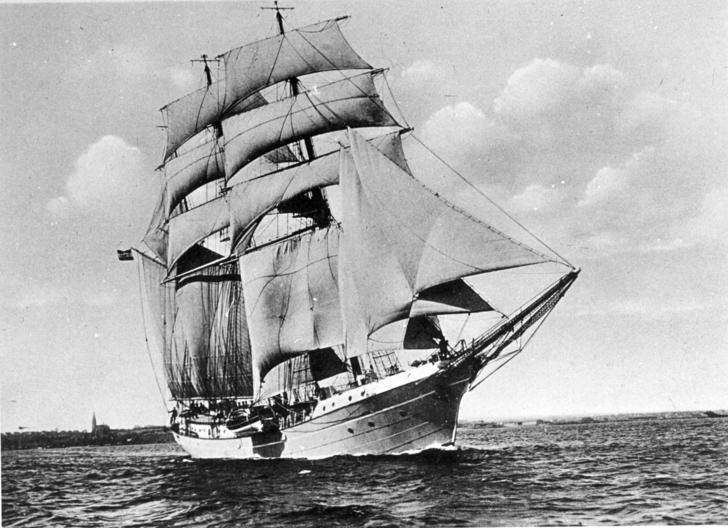
- Niobe, 1930

History

Germany
- Name: Niobe
- Namesake: Niobe
- Builder: Frederikshavns Værft og Flydedok
- Launched: 2 August 1913
- In service: 30 April 1923
- Captured: 21 November 1916
- Fate: Sunk 26 July 1932 off Fehmarn

General characteristics
- Class & type: training vessel
- Displacement: 645 t (635 long tons)
- Length: 46.1 m (151 ft 3 in)
- Beam: 9.17 m (30 ft 1 in)
- Draught: 5.2 m (17 ft 1 in)
- Propulsion: 1 Bolinder 2-cylinder two-stroke engine of 160 shp (120 kW)
- Sail plan: 943 m^{2} (10,150 sq ft)+40 m^{2} (430 sq ft)
- Speed: 7.5 knots (13.9 km/h; 8.6 mph)
- Complement: 7 officers, 27 men, and up to 65 cadets

Segelschulschiff Niobe was a tall ship used by the Reichsmarine to train cadets and aspiring NCOs. She sank during a white squall on 26 July 1932, with the loss of 69 lives. A memorial monument to Niobe was erected at Gammendorfer Strand on Fehmarn island, within view of the site of the sinking.

== History ==
=== Design ===
The ship had a steel hull and displaced 645 tonnes. After her conversion into a training ship she measured 57.8 m (189 ft 8 in) in length overall, 46.1 m (151 ft 3 in) without the bowsprit, and 9.17 m (30 ft 1 in) in width. The height of the main mast was 34.8 m (114 ft 2 in), and she carried 15 sails with 983 square metres (10,580 sq ft) of total sail area. She had an auxiliary diesel engine with 160 shaft horsepower (120 kW). Her regular crew comprised seven officers and 27 men. Usually 65 cadets would be trained.

=== Early service ===
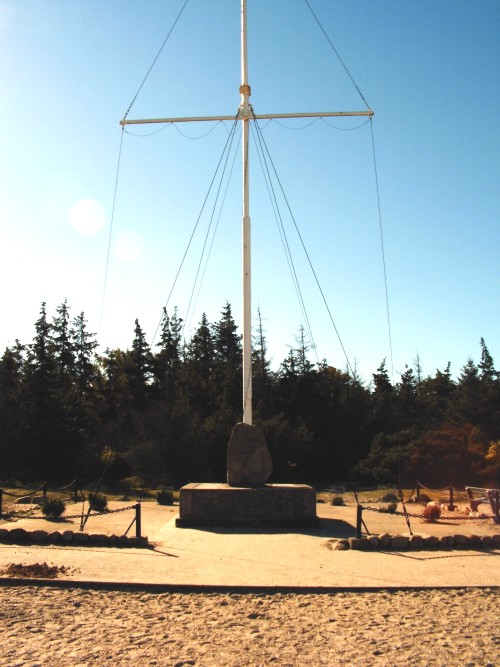
Monument near Gammendorf on Fehmarn

She was built as a four-masted schooner in 1913 by the Danish shipyard Frederikshavns Værft og Flydedok under her original name Morten Jensen and initially sailed as a freighter for F. L. Knakkergaard in Nykøbing Mors. In 1916 she was sold to Norway and renamed Tyholm. Later that year, while carrying mine timber to England, she was taken as a prize by SM UB-41 and sold to private German owners. Following several intermediate phases under various names (Aldebaran, Niobe, and Schwalbe), including one as a charter ship for a film company.

=== Training ship ===
Niobe was purchased in 1922 by the German navy which selected her new name Niobe after the mythological daughter of Tantalus, and converted her into a three-masted barque to train future officers and non-commissioned officers. The previous training vessels, Grossherzog Friedrich August and Prinzess Eitel Friedrich, had been seized by the Allies as war reparations.

The first commanding officer of Niobe was the legendary Kapitänleutnant (Lieutenant Commander) Graf Felix von Luckner. Von Luckner had previously commanded the SMS Seeadler (1915), a sailing ship used as a commerce raider, during the First World War and won fame for his outsized personality, daring and compassion. Von Luckner, who was a recipient of the Pour le Mérite and the Iron Cross, resigned from the German Navy in 1922.

=== Loss ===
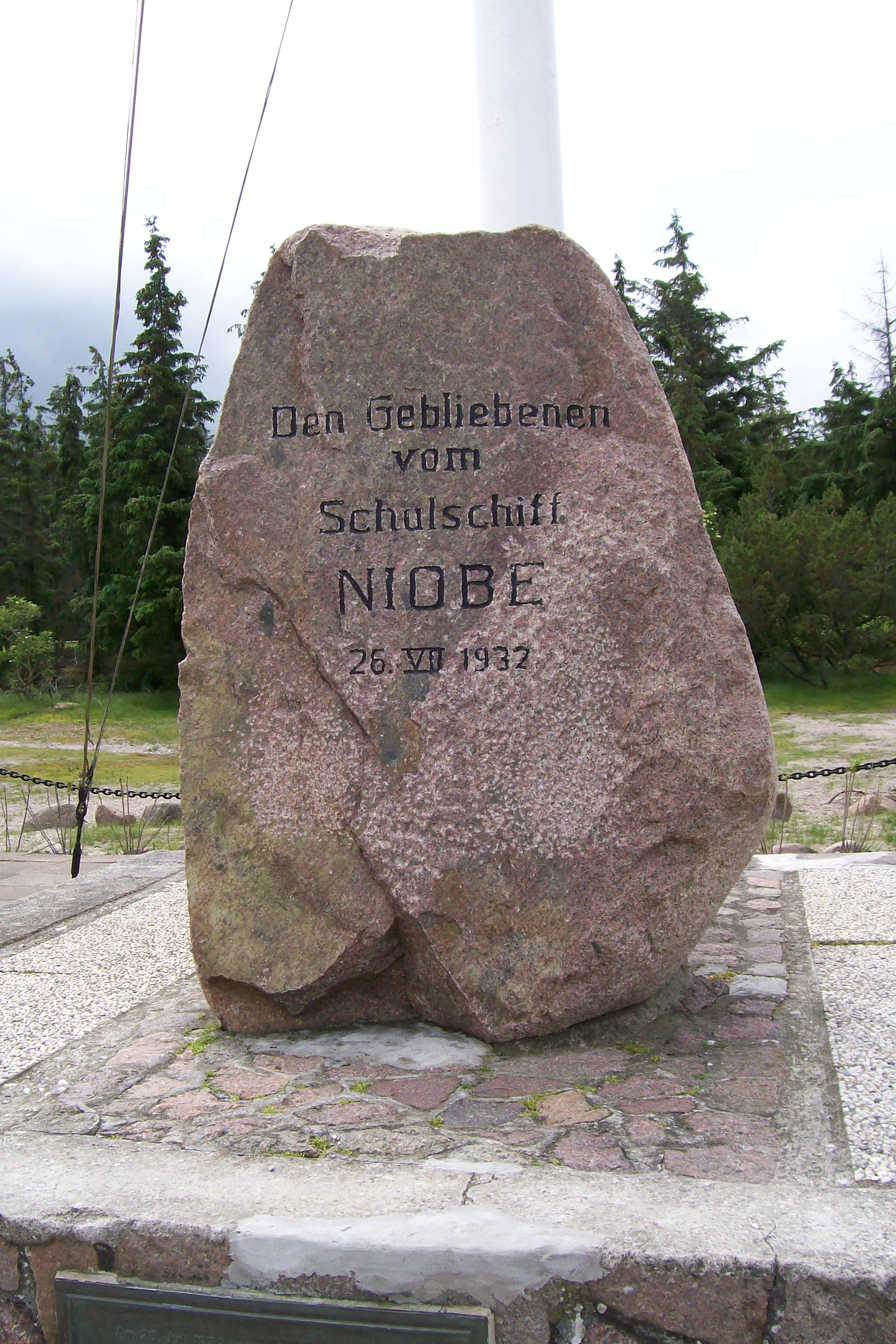
Monument

In a white squall on 26 July 1932, the ship capsized near the German island of Fehmarn in the Baltic Sea (54°35.7′N 11°11.2′E) and sank within minutes as due to the hot weather, all hatches and portholes were open. 40 of her crew were rescued by the cargo ship SS Theresia L M Russ, but 69 died.

The ship was raised on 21 August 1932, towed to Kiel and inspected while the bodies were buried. On 18 September 1933 the wreck was ceremonially sunk by the torpedo boat Jaguar, attended by much of the then-small German navy.

Flags were lowered to half-mast from Flensburg to Konstanz as a public outpouring of grief gripped the nation. The Prussian State Mint issued a Niobe memorial coin to help raise money for a replacement ship, and soon earned 200,000 Reichsmarks towards the effort, and spurred the building of the Gorch Fock in a record 100 days.
