= STA Travel =

Travel agency business

STA Travel Holding AG
- STA Travel logo introduced in 2013
- Type: GmbH
- Industry: Global student Youth travel agency
- Founded: 1979; 47 years ago
- Defunct: 21 August 2020
- Headquarters: Düsseldorf
- Area served: Germany
- Key people: Dick Porter (CEO)
- Services: Travel Agency
- Owner: Explorer Travel GmbH

STA Travel is a brand of Explorer Travel GmbH in Düsseldorf, Germany and a supplier of travel products online as well as in 15 shops located around Germany.

Until 2020 the company had been a global Travel Supplier supplying products and service to the general public through their 200 retail travel agency stores located globally. It had almost 2,000 employees working in over 200 stores worldwide.

In August 2020 the Swiss parent company filed for insolvency. The UK, Australian and New Zealand subsidiaries also entered administration in the same week. In December 2020, branches of the company were taken over by the travel agency New Travel Reisebüro Vertrieb (NTRV), whereby STA Travel was retained as a travel company. STA Travel is now (as of March 2025) a brand of Explorer Travel GmbH in Germany.

Originally an acronym for "Student Travel Australia", the company was later branded as "Student Travel Association" and later branded itself as a retronym "Start The Adventure". Under the BUNAC brand, the company arranged working holidays and volunteering.

== History ==
STA Travel was created in 1979 when Edward Keller of Zurich purchased the business of AUS Student Travel (AUSST) using Stewart Moffat Travel as the vehicle in order to expedite the sale.

AUSST was created in 1971 by the Australian Union of Students (AUS). Prior to this it was a department of AUS and before that a department of the National Union of Australian University Students (NUAUS) which was established in 1937 which had as one of its goals facilitating student travel.

in 1977 AUSST went broke but continued to trade under a scheme of arrangements approved by the Victorian Supreme Court until the business was sold and a new entity created Student Travel Australia which subsequently traded as STA Travel.

These facts can be verified by reference to the NUAUS/AUS/AUSST Archive Collection at the Australian National Archives and the proceedings of the Victorian Supreme Court.

The CEO for almost thirty years was Richard (Dick) Porter, who founded STA Travel alongside Gregor Macaulay, and then as CEO, grew the organisation and brand from its early creation to become the leading global student travel agency. In recent years the growth in the concept of a “gap year” to travel has been attributed to Dick Porter and his work building STA.

In August 2010, the company acquired Bridge the World, targeting an older and more affluent demographic. In November 2012, John Constable became chief executive officer of the company.

In June 2013, the company signed a marketing deal worth NZ$1.2 million annually with Tourism New Zealand to promote travel to New Zealand. In September 2013, the company signed a similar marketing deal with Tourism Australia worth £6 million over 3 years.

In May 2014, the company stopped offering escorted tours that offer elephant rides. In November 2018, the company produced a video featuring Skinny Living that showcased travel destinations in the United States.

=== 2020 Insolvency ===
On 20 August 2020, during the COVID-19 pandemic that heavily affected the travel industry, STA Travel Holding AG, the Swiss parent company, filed for insolvency. STA Travel UK entered administration and ceased trading on 21 August. In the UK the administration affects 52 shops and around 500 jobs. The Australian business, STA Travel Pty Ltd., and New Zealand Business, STA Travel (NZ) Limited also entered external administration with Deloitte. The Australian business was put into liquidation. The liquidators have received Court approval to pay customer refunds received, less cancellation fees and liquidators fees, to the clients who cancelled travel prior to 21 August 2020. On 24 August 2020 the South African business closed. In Germany, shops of STA Travel had been taken over in December 2020 and a final insolvency has been avoided. The brand still exists (status in March 2025).

== Controversies ==
In May 2019, the company initially refused to assist a couple who missed their long haul flight home due to a delayed domestic flight on Air India, costing their customers an extra £2,900. Their initial refusal to assist their customers was despite the United Kingdom's Package Travel Regulations 1992 and STA Travel having issued to their customers a certificate under the ATOL regime when they purchased their holiday. After negative publicity in The Independent newspaper, the next day the company admitted their error, apologised and reimbursed their aggrieved customers.

In April 2020, the company was forced to pay AU$14 million as a result of a complaint brought by the Australian Competition & Consumer Commission that the company misled consumers who purchased the MultiFLEX Pass by advertising that they would not have to pay anything further for date changes to their flights.

== See also ==
- Flight Centre
- Helloworld Travel
