= Work abroad =

Work abroad is the term used when a student teaches, interns, or volunteers in a foreign country through a programme. Students gain work experience while being immersed in a foreign work environment, though the position may be paid or unpaid. Dependent upon the programme, a student working abroad may live in a dormitory or apartment with other students or with a "host family", a group of people who live in that country and agree to provide student lodging.

While work abroad programmes are often grouped with study abroad programmes, in the past decade, there has been a distinction between the two, particularly in the benefits of each.

There are also some programs for employees because international experience brings a lot of benefits and opportunities for personal and business growth. Fostering networking and collaboration among all employees as well as knowledge and experience sharing have positive impact also on employer branding.

== History ==
The oldest programme listed in the Institution of International Education's (IIE) education abroad guides is one for teaching abroad, Princeton-in-Asia, founded in 1898. Reciprocal work-exchange programs were founded after World War II in hopes of fostering peace, including the Fulbright scholarship and teaching programs (1946) along with the International Association of Students in Economic and Business Management (AIESEC) and the International Association for the Exchange of Students for Technical Experience (IAESTE) (both in 1948). In 1950, AIPT was created. In the 1969, the Peace Corps, BUNAC, CDS International and the Council on International Educational Exchange (CIEE) were created. There has been a steady upward trend of students going abroad. During the past few years, the number of companies offering internships abroad (particularly adapted to students) has skyrocketed. Some platforms such as Stamps Internships propose a bank of internship offers abroad, while other companies like Bright Internships focus on helping each student individually find an internship in another country. This trend is also visible in volunteer work and picking up internships abroad.

== Work abroad versus study abroad ==
There are many similarities between working and studying abroad, particularly in the benefits: language immersion, wanderlust, and learning about the world around them. However, students in certain disciplines, such as engineering and architecture, in which practical, hands-on experience can add to the academic structure of a study abroad programme.

Statistics on working abroad are not well documented. This is most likely because students are enrolled in their own university when participating in a study exchange programme, and many universities do not host work abroad programmes.
