= Lattitude Global Volunteering =

- Founded: 1972
- Type: International organization
- Purpose: Development of young people, environmental, education and social care.
- Location: Reading, Berkshire, UK
- Volunteers: 40,000 since 1972
- Website: www.lattitude.org.uk
- Formerly called: GAP Activity Projects

Lattitude Global Volunteering (formerly GAP Activity Projects) was an international charity established in Reading, Berkshire, in 1972 to provide 17- to 25-year-olds with support to travel outside of their own community, in most cases to other countries, where they spent several months assisting with care or educational projects. Lattitude Global Volunteering voluntarily ceased operation in a liquidation on 26 August 2021.

In 2012 Lattitude co-ordinated activities for their 40,000th volunteer. The group is also credited with helping to coin the term "gap year" from its original name.

== History ==
Originally known as GAP Activity Projects, the not-for-profit organisation was founded in 1972 with the mission of creating safe and worthwhile volunteer work for school leavers before moving onto university.

The group was officially recognised as a charity in 1976 as they continued to expand the number volunteer opportunities around the world.

In 2000 the organisation co-founded the Year Out Group to promote the benefits of well-structured year out programmes.

2001 saw the opening of three new offices in Australia, New Zealand and Canada.

In 1995 the organisation was placing 1,500 volunteers per year. By 2005 that number had grown to 2,000. Lattitude Global Volunteering voluntarily ceased operation in a liquidation on 26 August 2021.

=== Rebrand ===
Despite coining the term "gap year" from its name, GAP Activity Projects relaunched in 2008 as Lattitude Global Volunteering. Lattitude state that this is to reflect that the organisation is focused on international volunteering projects for young people.

The change came less than one year after the clothing retailer Gap had taken a gap year company named "Gap Sports" to court over trademark infringement. At the time, a member of the Year Out Group mentioned that Gap Sports was not the only member to have faced a challenge from Gap Inc.". Whether or not the name change around this time is coincidental is unknown.

=== Liquidation ===
LATTITUDE GLOBAL VOLUNTEERING (Company Number 01289296)

Notice is hereby given that at a General Meeting of the above-named Company, duly convened and held at 9 Greyfriars Road, Reading, RG1 1NU on 26 August 2021 at 10.00 am, the following resolutions were passed as a Special resolution and Ordinary resolution respectively:

“That the Company be wound up voluntarily."

url https://www.thegazette.co.uk/notice/3879951/

== Volunteering ==
Volunteers could select from a number of educational, social or environmental placements throughout the world.

Volunteers were required to pay a fee to cover the expenses of the charity as well arranging and paying for their own transport. To reduce the likelihood of cost being a barrier to entry, a range of scholarships providing financial support are available along with on fundraising advice and grants.

Once at their placement, volunteers would have their food and accommodation provided. In most instances a portion of the fee was returned to the volunteer over the course of the stay as an allowance. Placements lasted between 3 and 12 months.
