= Zambeef Products =

Zambian food company

Zambeef
- Industry: Food, clothing
- Headquarters: Lusaka, Zambia
- Key people: • Faith Mukutu (CEO)
- Products: Meat, dairy, eggs, animal feed, leather
- Number of employees: 5,000+
- Website: www.zambeefplc.com

According to its website, Zambeef is the largest beef producer in Zambia. The company also provides feedlot services, and manufactures milk, chicken, eggs, leather and shoes. The company operates a fast food restaurant chain and a trucking company, including a fleet of refrigerated trucks. Zambeef grows crops, including wheat, maize, lucerne and soybeans, produces feed, and operates feed processing plants.

Its subsidiaries include Master Meats Production Company, of Nigeria. The company's export business is active, especially throughout southern Africa.

Zambeef also has a concessionary agreement with Shoprite to run all their butcheries.

'Zambeef claims to have a good Corporate social responsibility programme, since 2007 it has supported the African football social enterprise Alive & Kicking, giving it space on its Zamleather site as well as start up contributions.

Zambeef is listed on the Lusaka Stock Exchange with a market capitalisation of over US$70 million.

In July 2022, Zambeef signed a ZMW 570.0 million (US$35.0 million) debt facility with the International Finance Corporation (“IFC”) to partially fund its Mpongwe Farm expansion of US$ 100.0 million that the company announced in June 2022.

== Operations ==
Data
Zambeef:

- Slaughters 80,000 cattle per year
- Produces 8 million liters of milk per year
- Processes 3.5 million chickens per year
- Produces 25million eggs per year
- Produces 120 million tons of feed per
- Processes 90,000 hides per year
- Operates over 80 retail butcheries
- Operates the in-store meat departments of the Shoprite supermarket chain

Brands
Zambeef brands include:

- Novatek
- Zambeef
- Zamchick
- Zamchick Egg
- Zamchick Inns
- Zamflour
- Zam Milk
- Zamsip
- Zamleather Limited
- Zamshu
