= Bernard Cogan House =

Historic house in Massachusetts, United States

- U.S. National Register of Historic Places
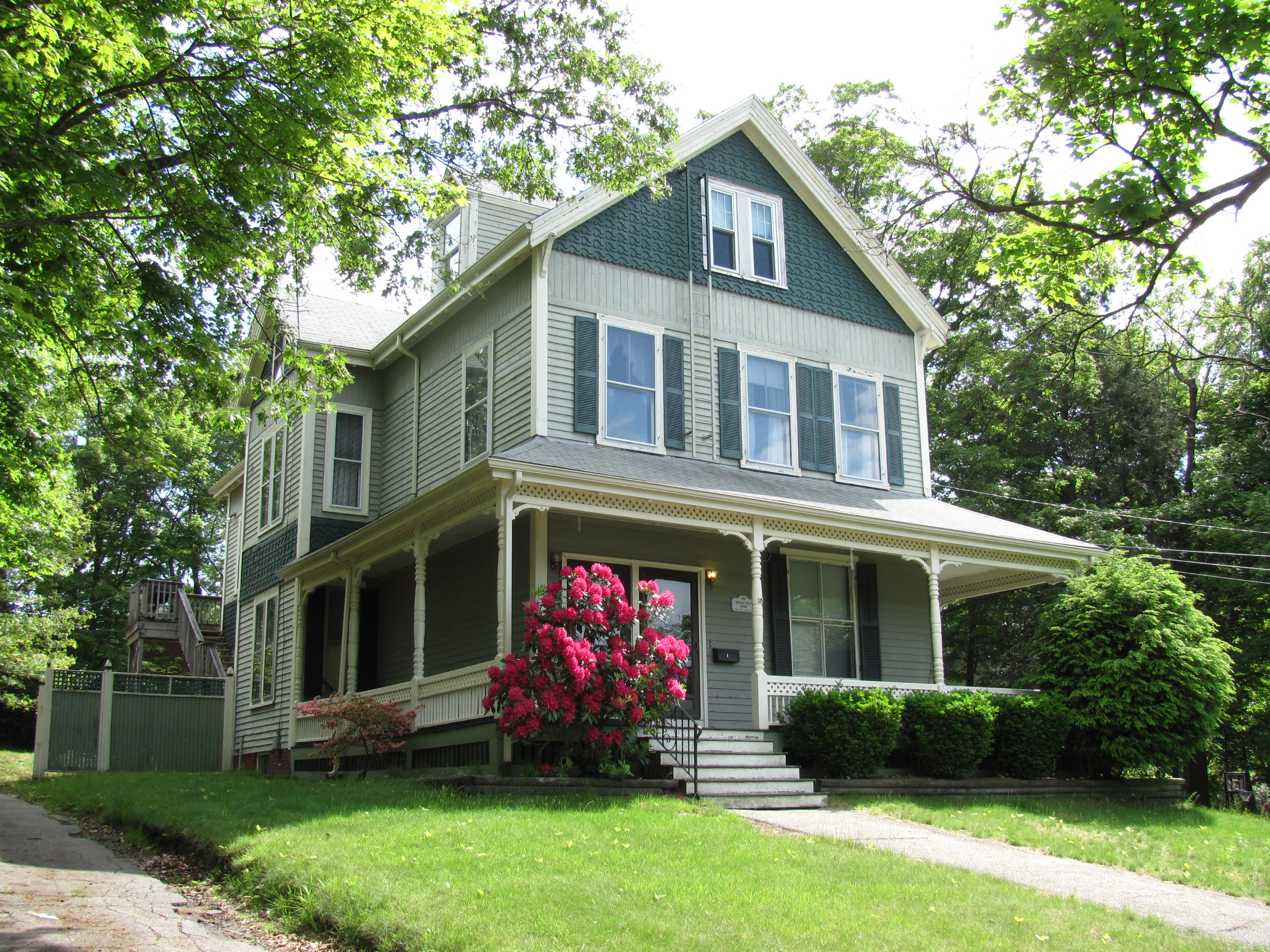
- Bernard Cogan House

- Location within Massachusetts Location within the United States
- Location: 10 Flint St., Stoneham, Massachusetts
- Coordinates: 42°28′59.40″N 71°6′3.89″W
- Built: 1885
- Architectural style: Queen Anne
- MPS: Stoneham MRA
- NRHP reference No.: 84002546
- Added to NRHP: April 13, 1984

The Bernard Cogan House is a historic house at 10 Flint Avenue in Stoneham, Massachusetts, United States. Built about 1885, it is a good local example of Queen Anne style architecture in the United States. It was built for Bernard Cogan, the son of a local shoe factory owner. The house was listed on the National Register of Historic Places in 1984.

== Description and history ==
The Bernard Cogan House stands north of Stoneham's Central Square, on the south side of Flint Street, near its junction with Main Street (from which it is separated by a two-level parking garage). It is a 2 1/2-story wood-frame structure, set on a lot lined at the sidewalk by a low fieldstone retaining wall. The house is a basically rectangular plan with off-center entry, and a cross-gable roof section near the back of the house, where there is a projecting section. There is a porch that wraps around the front of the house to the left side where it runs to the projection. The porch has turned pillars, a decorative valance, and decorative railings. The walls are covered in sections of clapboard, decorative cut shingles, and vertical paneling.

It was built about 1885 for Bernard Cogan, son of Patrick Cogan, the owner of a local shoe factory. Patrick Cogan founded P. Cogan & Son in 1876, and was one of three major local shoe manufacturers to survive into the 20th century. This house was typical in size and scale for the more successful of Stoneham's businessmen, and is similar to the house of Bernard's brother James, who was his business partner in the firm.

== See also ==
- National Register of Historic Places listings in Stoneham, Massachusetts
- National Register of Historic Places listings in Middlesex County, Massachusetts
