= British Universities North America Club =

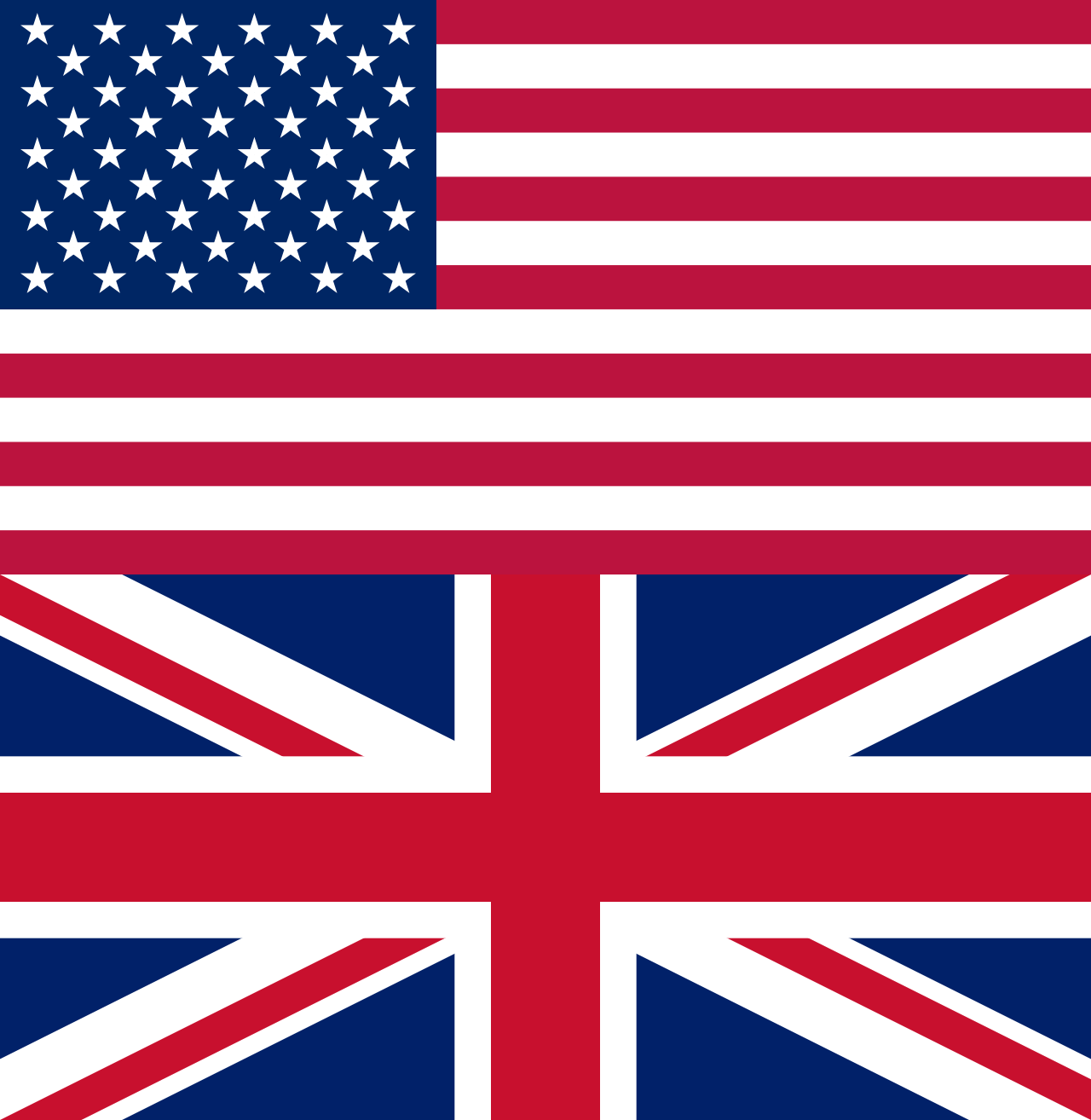
- Trade name: BUNAC
- Company type: Private
- Founded: United Kingdom
- Headquarters: London, United Kingdom
- Area served: Worldwide
- Key people: John Constable (Director); Stephen Jenkins (Director); Hollie Brooks (General Manager)
- Services: Work abroad and Volunteer Programs
- Revenue: ▼GB£1,988,089 (2015); ▼GB£2,261,706 (2014); ▼GB£2,329,513 (2013); GB£4,567,183 (2012)
- Parent: STA Travel Holding AG, Switzerland
- Subsidiaries: International Exchange Programs Pty Ltd, Australia
- Website: bunac.org

The British Universities North America Club (BUNAC) is an organisation that enables people to explore the world through work abroad and travel programmes. After starting as a not-for-profit members Club, it was taken over by Bunac Travel Services Ltd which was acquired by STA Travel in 2011. The 'BUNAC' brand and all associated work and volunteer abroad programme brand names are now owned by STA Travel. Previously, the company was owned by the non-profit British Universities North America Club in order to provide work and volunteer programmes for their members. Due to this, the term 'BUNAC' now refers exclusively to STA Travel owned products, and not the non-profit Club.

== History ==
The British Universities North America Club was founded in 1962 by Christopher Harbour and Martin Truscott. It grew out of the Canada Clubs and North America Clubs at the University of Oxford, University of Cambridge and University of London. It is a not-for-profit members Club and was one of the largest and oldest international work exchange organisations in the UK.

During the 1960s, the British Universities North America Club was actively involved in the efforts of Lord Harlech (British Ambassador to the USA 1961–65) to formalise the reciprocal arrangements between the US and the UK to enable students from one of those countries to work in the other. This resulted in the development of the Exchange Visitor Programme (EVP) which allowed degree-level students to work in the USA during their summer vacation and, in 1966, the creation of SEEP (the Student Employment Exchange Program) US to UK programme. SEEP became known as the Work in Britain/Blue Card programme. The US administration of Work in Britain was originally undertaken by BUNAC's American partner CIEE until it was taken on completely by BUNAC USA in 1997. BUNAC's Work in Britain quickly grew to become the largest outbound work abroad programme from the USA until September 2008 when the 5-Tier Managed Migration restructuring of work-based immigration policy by the Home Office UKBA abolished the concession under which it existed. BUNAC's long-running Work America summer programme operates within the US State Department J-1 visa Program framework.

In 1969 Lord Harlech became Honorary President with The Rt. Hon John Freeman and Senator James William Fulbright as Honorary Vice Presidents. The BUNACAMP programme was established by John Ball and Howard Crew in 1970. BUNACAMP (later BUNACAMP Counsellors and now Summer Camp USA) enables young people to spend a summer working as camp counsellors for American children on a wide range of summer camps.

BUNAC's early involvement with Canada was through a relatively restrictive tobacco picking programme. In 1986, in co-operation with the Canadian High Commission and the Canadian Department of Foreign Affairs, BUNAC was authorised to offer a small but much more open Work Canada programme for students only. This developed into a much larger programme allowing 18- to 30-year-olds to work in Canada for up to a year, which is still offered today as BUNAC's Work Canada programme.

Throughout the 1990s BUNAC expanded the range of work abroad destinations from the UK to include Australia, New Zealand, a Teach & Travel China Programme, volunteer programmes to South Africa, Ghana, Costa Rica, Peru, Cambodia and, most recently, India.

BUNAC did not run their Summer Camp USA programme for the 2013 camp season, however in September 2013 they announced that it will again be running a summer camp program for 2014, this time called Summer Camp Exchange USA. The difference in this new summer camp program is that an applicant needs to have experience in coaching specific skills, so it seems that people can no longer apply to be a general cabin counselor.

As of July 2013, BUNAC in the UK currently operate work abroad, summer camp, volunteer and internship programmes to the US, Canada, Australia, New Zealand, China, Thailand, Nepal and South Africa. From the US, BUNAC operates programs to Great Britain, Australia, Ireland, and New Zealand.

== British Universities North America Club ==
The British Universities North America Club was a not-for-profit club, separate to the BUNAC brand which operates work and volunteer programmes. The Club membership elected an Honorary Chairperson, Honorary Treasurer and Honorary Secretary annually. These “officers of the Club” sat on a fully voting basis on what was BUNAC's governing body, the General Council. Previously there was also a National Committee (known as the NatCom) made up of members of the club (usually students), and this group met frequently during year.

The club's objectives were

to encourage interest in Canada, the United States of America and Mexico among students at British universities and colleges and interest in Britain among students at universities and colleges in the aforementioned countries, leading to a better understanding between our nations, and generally to promote the advancement of learning and education of students of Britain and the other aforementioned countries. To work with other organisations with similar aims in any fields that will further these objects.

It was reported that what remains of the non-profit club was likely to be closed in 2013.

== Scholarships and awards ==
Originally started by the club, BUNAC offers financial assistance for British students wishing to study in the US and Canada through scholarships. A number of scholarships are awarded each year through the BEST (British Universities North America Club Educational Scholarship Trust) Scholarships. These are marketed and administered by BUNAC, the brand. The individual amounts awarded vary but are typically in the region of $5,000–$10,000.

Introduced in 1996 in honour of the late Howard Crew (General Secretary of BUNAC, 1966 to 1992) the Green Cheese Awards consist of the scholarship and prizes and are awarded on a competitive basis. Entrants are required to submit a humorous piece of creative writing which is judged according to originality, presentation and content. The unique nature of the awards reflects the personality and the sense of humour of Howard Crew. These are also marketed and administered by BUNAC, the brand.

Previously offered were the BEST Travel Awards of $1,000, intended to offset the cost of travel to the USA or Canada by British university students taking part in a year of study abroad in North America as part of their UK undergraduate degree. These have not been offered since 2009.

== Office locations ==
BUNAC's Head Office is currently in Kensington, London and BUNAC's US office is located in Dallas, Texas. Previous office locations in the UK include Farringdon and Victoria in London and Edinburgh - in the US previous locations are Boston, MA and Southbury, CT.

In Australia BUNAC provides outbound programmes through its wholly owned subsidiary organisation International Exchange Programs Pty. Ltd (Australia). Inbound participants are serviced by the company Work n Holiday as of 2011, who have offices in Sydney, Melbourne, Brisbane and Perth. IEP Australia has their office in Melbourne - they previously also had an office in Sydney, however this closed at the end of 2010.

In New Zealand BUNAC provides inbound and outbound programmes through International Exchange Programs Ltd. (New Zealand). The IEP New Zealand office is in Auckland.

Long-term partnership arrangements also exist with countries such as South Africa, Poland, Germany, Netherlands, Sweden, France, Serbia, Hungary, Macedonia, Lithuania, Russia, Turkey and Ukraine.

== Industry affiliations ==
BUNAC was a founder member of IAEWEP (the International Association for Educational and Work Exchange Programmes) which has since become the WYSE Work Abroad Association, and is a founder member of The Year Out Group in the UK. BUNAC is also a member of BUTEX, ISTC, BETA (the British Educational Travel Association) and of the Foreign and Commonwealth Office “Know before you go” safety campaign. In the United States, BUNAC USA is a member of NAFSA: Association of International Educators and the Alliance for International Educational and Cultural Exchange and a founder member of the American Camp Association ICEO Group (International Cultural Exchange Organisations).

In December 2007 a consortium of BUNAC, Christian Aid and Islamic Relief was authorised by Department for International Development (DFID) to create, administer and operate Platform2. This was a DFID-funded 3-year volunteer programme designed to provide short-term (c10 weeks) overseas volunteering experience for 2,500 economically disadvantaged young UK citizens.
