= Operation Drake =

Round-the-world voyage in the brigantine Eye of the Wind

Operation Drake (1978–1980) was a round-the-world voyage with the participation of young people from many countries, sailing in the brigantine Eye of the Wind. She left Plymouth in October 1978 and returned to London two years later, in December 1980.

Named after Sir Francis Drake, who had circumnavigated the world 400 years earlier on the Golden Hind, Operation Drake was divided into nine ocean- and one land-based phases, each lasting about 3 months. On each phase, a number of Young Explorers aged between seventeen and twenty-four, selected from countries all over the world, worked together on serious scientific exploration, research and community projects.

The expedition was mounted by the Scientific Exploration Society, and the expedition leader was Colonel John Blashford-Snell. Charles, Prince of Wales, (now King Charles III), was the Patron of Operation Drake. One prominent member of the youth taking part in the voyage was Alan Green, now known as 'Guppyman;.

Amongst the works produced on the voyage were series of specimens, including bats obtained in New Guinea, that were deposited and examined at the British Museum of Natural History.

== Books ==
- Blashford-Snell, John (1981). Operation Drake. London: W. H. Allen & Co. ISBN 0-491-02965-9.
- "In the Eye of the Wind", by Roger Chapman (Hamish Hamilton, London 1982, ISBN 0-241-10764-4)
- Mitchell, Andrew W. (1982). Operation Drake, Voyage of Discovery. William Collins, Sons. ISBN 0-7278-2007-9.)

== See also ==
- Raleigh International
