= Gapyear.com =

UK based social network site

- Travel, experience, share
- Website type: Social media, Travel advice
- Founded: 1998
- Predecessor: thegapyear.co.uk gapyear.co.uk
- Country of origin: United Kingdom
- Owner: Flight Centre Ltd
- Founders: Peter Pedrick and Tom Griffiths
- Industry: gap year, volunteering, backpacking, ecotourism, tourism
- Website: www.gapyear.com
- Launched: July 1998; 28 years ago
- Current status: Closed

Gapyear.com (company name The Gap Year Company Ltd) was a social networking website started in the UK, in 1998, by Peter Pedrick and Tom Griffith. It was one of the world's first social media networks and focused on assisting young and old volunteers and backpackers to take a gap year. It was the first company to consolidate and promote the gap year industry internationally and online.

The website had more than 100,000 pages of hand-written advice, country-based content, ideas, and opportunities on everything related to gap years and backpacking, including information on planning your trip, destinations, volunteering, and working abroad. The site was built around a travel community where the members engaged through physical events, blogs, chat groups and message boards.

The company collated data, performed research, invented products, phrases and concepts that have formed the skeleton of the international gap year industry seen today and played a role in defining the underlying principles of Fair Trade volunteering, building a long-running relationship with the UK government agency Connexions to give advice to students during A-level clearing.

== History ==
In 1997, Tom Griffiths published the book Before You Go, foreword written by Sir Michael Palin, about overcoming the emotional and practical hurdles when planning your gap year or backpacking adventure. He won The Times' Young Travel Writer of the Year award for the book.

Peter Pedrick was an IT consultant known for establishing the first market share database for each vehicle tyre-type sold in the UK on behalf of the British Rubber Manufacturers' Association.

Peter Pedrick and Tom Griffiths went on to create The Gap Year Company Ltd., in July 1998, with the purpose of publishing a website, creating services to assist young people to travel and change the perception of a gap year from something that just rich kids did to something that everyone could do - work, volunteering or travel. The website initially launched as thegapyear.co.uk, became gapyear.co.uk in 1999 and in 2000 was changed to gapyear.com, with the intention of targeting the international travel market.

An additional book, The Virgin Student Traveller's Handbook, was also launched in 1999 with foreword written by Sir Richard Branson which offered more detailed country and travel preparation information than the first book.

Gapyear.com published the Gap Year Magazine in 2001 and it was distributed to UK universities, colleges and schools until 2012. It was designed to inspire and offer advice about all forms of gap years, covering volunteering, backpacking, working abroad or just taking time out.

Tom Griffiths acted on behalf of the gapyear.com as media spokesperson and quickly became the spokesperson for the gap year industry between 1998 until 2011.

In 2004, the company assisted in the creation of the Barclays Gap Year Bank Account (did not launch) and the HSBC Gap Year Bank Account. In 2005, gapyear.com worked with Advance Payment Solutions (APS) to launch the Gap Year Cashplus Prepaid MasterCard, a multi-currency prepayment card, a first for the backpacker travel market.

In 2010, gapyear.com became a part of Flight Centre Ltd. after attaining over 2 million site users.

In 2021, the website closed.

== Mindset, data & terminology ==
Gapyear.com created significant industry awareness in the UK and internationally by collating data and publishing statistics into them media and creating various terms for the "gappers" of the industry.

Between 2001 and 2010, the company researched the mindsets and motivations involved in long-term travel and volunteering and found, for many, a gap year occurred during a major life stage that required a mindset transition. A "gap" to breathe and take stock in preparation for change. Highlighting seven major life stages of mindset, they mainly promoted the first two of those categories:

The first life stage was a change from dependence (on family and school structure) to independence (going to university and/or leaving home, where you are free of many obligations and controls). The difficult act of saving money at a young age, when everyone was spending theirs, and taking the time to plan and prepare a world trip or volunteer already demonstrates a level of maturity that employers should find important in young graduates.

The second life stage was from independence to commitment (starting to add more structure to your life, such as committing to a career or settling down with a long-term partner - settling down). Known as a "career gap", they highlighted the recruitment and productivity benefits, to employers, of helping younger staff members to settle in to their roles instead of finding new opportunities.

The company also proved a growing market demand in the 50+ year-old demographic, during retirement, empty nest and bereavement life stages, that would be covered by several terms "SKIers(spending the kids inheritance)" "grown-up gap year" and "silver\golden gap year". New data suggests that as much as one third of the gap year market are now in this age group.

In addition to consulting governments and industry they assisted with the placement of GBP £150m into the UK 2007 budget with concept support in other countries. Also, in 2005, providing industry data to Mintel who compiled the Mintel Gap Year Report valuing the industry at $5bn and growing to $11bn by 2010. In their report, Mintel stated that gap years were now affecting half a generation of the first world.

== Awards ==
- British Youth Travel Awards 2007 – Best Website (winner)
- British Youth Travel Awards 2008 – Best Website (finalist)
- British Youth Travel Awards 2008 – Most Innovative Marketing (finalist)
- British Youth Travel Awards 2009 – Best Website (finalist)
