= Overseas experience =

Extended overseas working period or holiday

Overseas experience (OE) is a New Zealand term for an extended overseas working period or holiday. It is sometimes referred to as the "big OE", in reference to the extended duration of the travel: typically at least one year, and often extended far longer. It is however generally expected that the person returns after a few years with work and life experience and a wider outlook. This is considered important to career development, especially among professionals.

From the 1950s, OEs were often centred on London, and were described as "going home", a "working holiday", or an "overseas trip", until the term OE was popularised by New Zealand cartoonist and columnist Tom Scott in the mid 1970s.

== Description ==
The term OE is part of the New Zealand vernacular, to the extent that official government literature, including the Inland Revenue Department website, name it as a sub-category.

The abbreviation OE is sometimes spoken as if it is a formal qualification — as in "do you have your OE?" — because before 2004 the top secondary school qualification was UE ("University Entrance"). The phrase also indicates that the trip is considered to be an important milestone in one's career development, especially for professional and employees of large multinationals, and is often asked for during job interviews.

A typical OE is mostly or entirely self-funded and involves working overseas. The typical OE traveller is in their 20s. Variations are common. Many people spend a year or so teaching English overseas, especially in Japan or South Korea. Enough Māori take OEs for there to be a permanent Māori culture group (Ngāti Rānana) in London. The European OE usually includes travel within Europe and, often, a pilgrimage to the Gallipoli battle site. In recent years, Asian destinations including South Korea, Singapore, Japan and China have become increasingly popular.

London's historical popularity as an OE destination was described by historian James Belich as "recolonisation". He said New Zealand developed very strong cultural ties to the United Kingdom, and tended to see London as the centre of the universe. During the 19th and early 20th centuries many white colonials in the British Empire viewed Britain as "Home" even if they had never been there. London, as the capital of Britain and the Empire, was especially attractive. From the late 1880s to the early 1900s 10,000 Australians and New Zealanders traveled to Britain each year, with the number doubling between the World Wars. British immigration law until the 1970s allowed Australians and New Zealanders to live and work in Britain as British citizens. The continuation of the trend may be residual recolonialism, but in addition most New Zealanders have friends and often relatives in London, and its favourable working holiday scheme, proximity to the rest of Europe, and the fact that it is English-speaking also make Britain a desirable destination. In 2003 then Prime Minister Helen Clark described the OE to Britain as "an important tradition for many New Zealanders".

== Working holiday schemes ==
New Zealand has reciprocal working holiday schemes with a large number of countries. These allow young people from those countries to apply for a working holiday visa for New Zealand, but also for New Zealand citizens to apply for a working holiday visa to be able to work and live in those countries for (usually) up to a year. In order to be eligible, travellers need to be between 18 and 30 (sometimes 35) years of age. Some countries (like the USA) require applications to be made through organisations like IEP, CCUSA, Camp Leaders, or Camp Canada. The full current list of countries covered is:

- Argentina
- Austria
- Belgium
- Brazil
- Canada
- Chile
- China
- Croatia
- Czech Republic
- Denmark
- Estonia
- Finland
- France
- Germany
- Hong Kong
- Hungary
- Ireland
- Israel
- Italy
- Japan
- Korea
- Latvia
- Lithuania
- Luxembourg
- Malaysia
- Malta
- Mexico
- Netherlands
- Norway
- Peru
- Philippines
- Poland
- Portugal
- Singapore
- Slovakia
- Slovenia
- Spain
- Sweden
- Taiwan
- Thailand
- Turkey
- United Kingdom
- United States
- Uruguay
- Vietnam

== See also ==
- TNT Magazine
- Gap year
