= Zebu (ship) =

Tall ship, built 1938, wrecked 2021

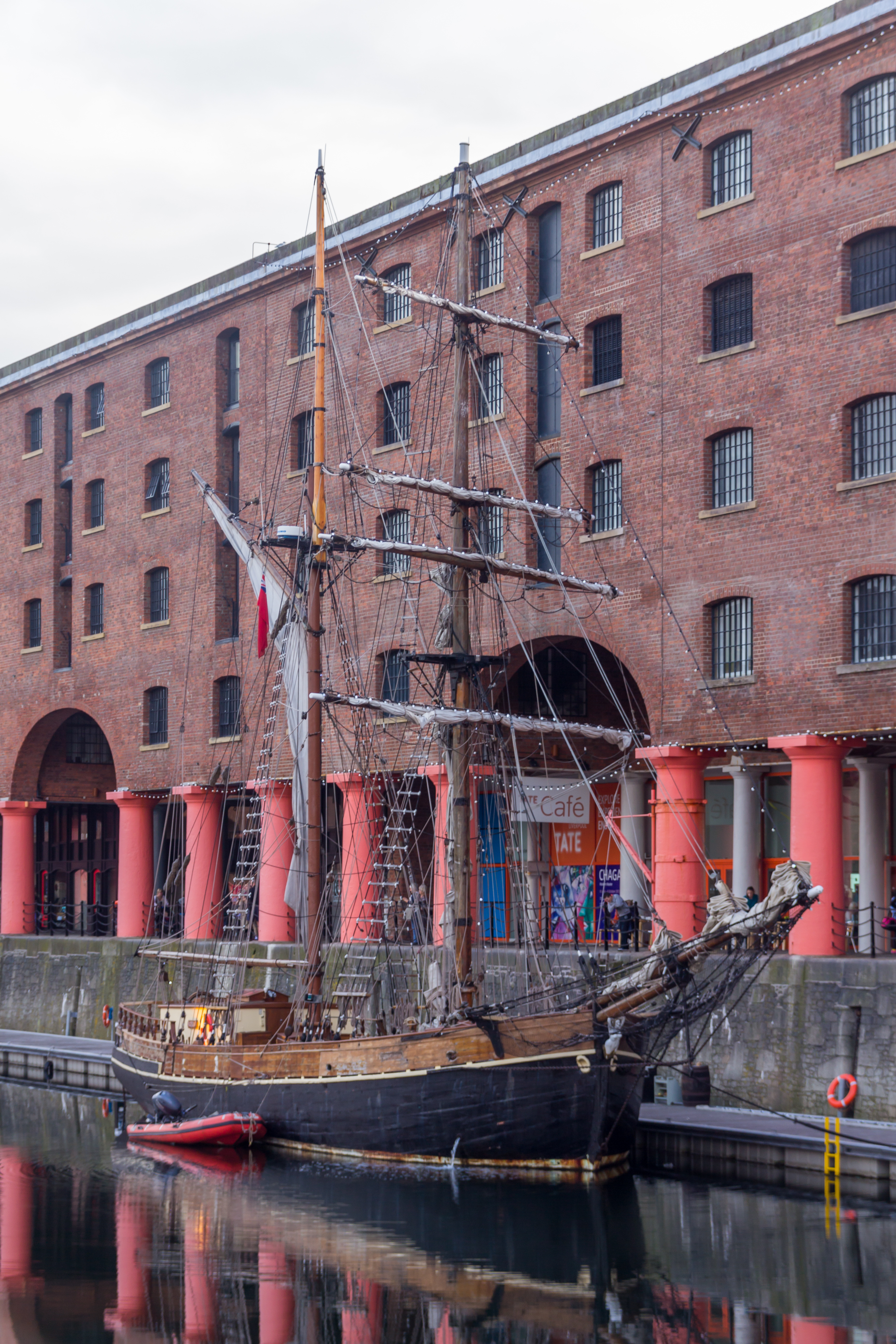
- Zebu at the Albert Dock

History
- Name: Zebu
- Route: Baltic Sea
- Builder: A.B. Holms, Sweden
- Launched: 1938
- Fate: Relocated to the UK in the 1970s

History
- Owner: Nick Broughton
- Operator: Operation Raleigh

History
- Owner: Mersey Heritage Trust
- Refit: 2000
- Home port: Liverpool
- Nickname(s): Flagship of Liverpool
- Fate: Sank, 4 September 2015; Refloated, 25–29 September 2015; Aground, Holyhead 15 May 2021 - Scrapped

General characteristics
- Length: 31.0 metres (101.7 ft) (Length overall)
- Beam: 6.1 metres (20 ft)
- Draught: 2.3 metres (7.5 ft)

Zebu, formerly Ziba, was a historic tall ship. Built in Sweden in 1938, she was used as a trading vessel until the late 1960s, before circumnavigating the globe in the 1980s. She has been based in Liverpool since the 1980s. She sank in 2015, and was subsequently restored. She partially sank again in 2021 after running aground on Holyhead breakwater after slipping her anchor, and had masts and sails removed to reduce weight so the hull could be moved. On 21 May 2021 after suffering further damage due to a storm, she was declared a wreck.

== History ==
=== Baltic trading vessel ===
The wood-hulled sailing ship was laid down and built in 1938 at A.B. Holms, Råå, Sweden. Originally named Ziba, she was built as a galeas, and was used as a Baltic trading vessel, carrying cargo such as wood, paper, and iron ore. She originally had a Ketch rig. She is 31.00 metres (101.71 ft) in overall length, of which 21.90 metres (71.9 ft) is the hull, with a beam of 6.10 metres (20.0 ft) and a draught of 2.30 metres (7.5 ft).

During the Second World War, she was possibly used to smuggle refugees and arms from Poland and Denmark, supporting the Polish Home Army.

Her rigging was later removed when she was motorized, with a custom-built engine, in 1950. She was in service as a trading vessel until the late 1960s.

=== Operation Raleigh ===
She was converted back to a sailing ship in the 1970s, and relocated to the UK. She was purchased by Nick Broughton and chartered to Operation Raleigh, led by Colonel Blashford-Snell, named after Walter Raleigh's first expedition to North America 400 years earlier. She was extensively refitted, and the expedition was launched by Charles, Prince of Wales from St Katharine Docks in October 1984. She circumnavigated the globe between 1984 and 1988, over which time she carried nearly 500 young people, and visited 41 countries. During the operation she hosted people excavating the wreck of the Zanoni off the coast of Adelaide, Australia.

=== Liverpool ===
From the late 1980s for the next 27 years, she was based in Liverpool, and owned by the Mersey Heritage Trust. She was overhauled and refitted in 2000, and became known as the 'Flagship of Liverpool'. She has Brigantine rigging, with the main mast, the second and tallest of the two masts, carrying at least two sails. The foremast is square-rigged.

In August 2013 the ship listed to port, with no-one aboard, and was subsequently stabilised.

Around 4.30am on 4 September 2015, she sank at her moorings near to the Pumphouse Pub. Work to raise her started on Friday 25 September 2015, and finished on Tuesday 29 September 2015, by salvage teams from Hughes Sub-Surface Engineering, Waterwitch Engineering and Carmet Tug Company, using 8 airlift bags. Three days after Zebu was refloated, she was towed from outside of Tate Liverpool to Canning Dock, near to the Merseyside Maritime Museum.

In January 2017 the ship was purchased by Gerrith and Suzi Borrett, and National Lottery Resilience Funding was received in November 2017. The community interest company Tall Ship ZEBU was founded in April 2017. In 2018, she was the first historic tall ship to be fitted with an electrical propulsion system. As of 2019, more restoration work was ongoing in order to turn the ship into a floating, mobile museum and educational platform in late 2020, that would be capable of going out to sea rather than staying in harbour.

=== Holyhead ===
On 13 May 2021, she was heading from Liverpool to Bristol for conservation works when she and a six-person crew were towed into Holyhead by the RNLI, due to concern over slow progress near the Holyhead shipping lanes. She anchored in Holyhead harbour but subsequently drifted, and on the afternoon of Saturday 15 May she was reported to be aground, lodged onto Holyhead Breakwater and that salvage operations were underway. On 18 May 2021 it was decided to dismantle the ship rather than refloating it, initially removing the masts and stabilising the hull, with initial fears that the damage was too severe to salvage the vessel. However, the ship's official website indicated there was less damage than expected when she was inspected after removing the masts. The cause of the accident was confirmed by the ship's website as anchor dragging. On 21 May, a storm caused further damage, and Zebu was declared a wreck.
