= James Cogan (teacher) =

British schoolteacher and charity founder

James Atcheson Cogan
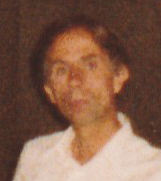
- James Cogan in 1985
- Born: 15 May 1937; Liverpool, England
- Died: 27 September 2007 (aged 70); London, England
- Other name: Jim Cogan
- Education: Corpus Christi College, Oxford
- Occupation: Schoolteacher · Deputy Headmaster · Charity founder
- Years active: 1964–2007 (approx.)
- Known for: Deputy Headmaster at Westminster School; founder of Students’ Partnership Worldwide
- Spouse: Jenny Douglas (m. 1966)
- Children: 2 sons, 2 daughters
- Awards: Officer of the Order of the British Empire (OBE), 2003

James Atcheson “Jim” Cogan (15 May 1937 – 27 September 2007) was a British schoolteacher, deputy headmaster, and charity worker. He is best known for his long service at Westminster School and for founding the charities Students’ Partnership Worldwide (SPW), an educational and development charity now known as Restless Development, and Alive & Kicking.

== Early life and education ==
Cogan was born in Liverpool on 15 May 1937. He undertook National Service in Nigeria with the West African Frontier Force. He went on to study at Corpus Christi College, Oxford, initially reading Greats before switching to English.

== Teaching career ==
After a brief stint at Rugby School and a year in Jamaica, Cogan joined the staff of Westminster School in 1964, where he remained until 1999. At Westminster he taught English, held senior roles including Under Master and Master of the Queen’s Scholars, and eventually became Deputy Headmaster in 1971.. He was known for his passion for literature (especially Shakespeare, Yeats and Wordsworth) and for nurturing intellectual curiosity in students.

== Charitable work ==
In 1985, Cogan founded Students’ Partnership Worldwide (SPW), initially conceived as a gap-year programme linking Western students with communities in developing countries. Over time, SPW evolved to focus on youth leadership, HIV/AIDS education, and environmental programmes in African and Asian nations. Cogan directed SPW for 18 years, working without pay. Today the charity is known as Restless Development.

Among Cogan's other projects were The Good Earth Trust, which used compressed-earth bricks to build water-conservation structures in Africa, reducing the need for fuelwood, and Alive & Kicking, a venture to manufacture durable, repairable footballs in Kenya and Zambia, providing employment and affordable sports goods locally.

In recognition of his service, he was appointed an Officer of the Order of the British Empire (OBE) in 2003.

== Personal life and death ==
In 1966, Cogan married Jenny Douglas; they had two sons and two daughters.

James Cogan died suddenly on 27 September 2007, aboard a flight returning from a work trip in Africa.

== See also ==
- King's Scholar (Westminster School)
- College (Westminster School)
