= James Cogan House =

Historic house in Massachusetts, United States

- U.S. National Register of Historic Places
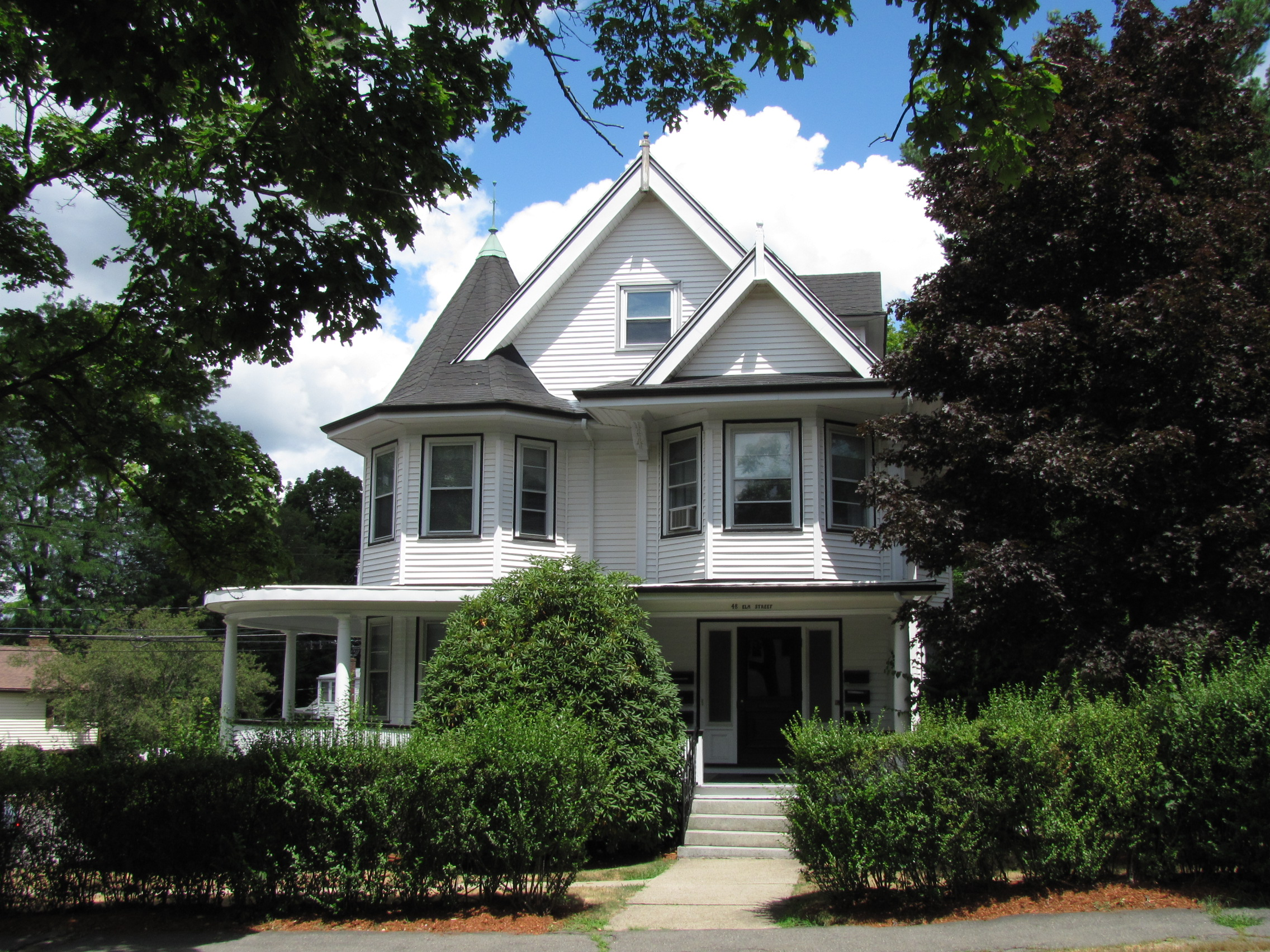
- James Cogan House

- Location within Massachusetts Location within the United States
- Location: 48 Elm St., Stoneham, Massachusetts
- Coordinates: 42°29′14″N 71°5′50″W
- Built: 1890
- Architectural style: Queen Anne
- MPS: Stoneham MRA
- NRHP reference No.: 84002550
- Added to NRHP: April 13, 1984

The James Cogan House is a historic house at 48 Elm Street in Stoneham, Massachusetts. It was built about 1890 for James Cogan, son of a prominent local shoe manufacturer, and is a prominent local example of Queen Anne architecture. The house was listed on the National Register of Historic Places in 1984.

== Description and history ==
The James Cogan House stands east of Stoneham's Central Square, at the northeast corner of Waverly Street with Elm Street, the latter being a major east–west road from the center. It is a 2 1/2-story wood-frame structure, with a gabled roof and synthetic sided exterior. The house follows a basic rectangular plan, which is disguised by a wraparound porch on the first floor, and a projecting bay window with gable top above the entrance on the right, and a multi-sided turret above on the left. The house was listed on the National Register in part for its architectural style, but many of those features have been lost by the application of vinyl siding. Surviving features include the round porch columns, and finials at the peaks of the gables.

The house was built about 1890 for James Cogan, son of Patrick Cogan, owner of a local shoe factory. P. Cogan and Son, founded in 1876, was one of Stoneham's successful shoe manufacturers that survived into the 20th century. James Cogan and his brother Bernard (whose house stands on Flint Street) carried on the business after their father; both of their houses typify the improved social standing attending the success of the business.

== See also ==
- Bernard Cogan House, belonging to James Cogan's brother
- National Register of Historic Places listings in Stoneham, Massachusetts
- National Register of Historic Places listings in Middlesex County, Massachusetts
