= Raleigh International =

British youth expedition organisation

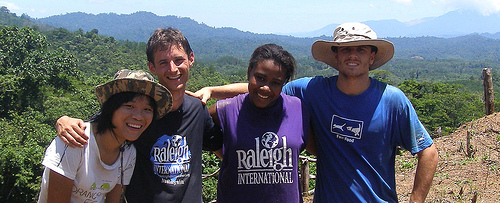
- Founded: 1984
- Purpose: Sustainable development
- Location: United Kingdom
- Region served: Worldwide
- Website: raleighinternational.org
- Formerly called: Operation Raleigh

Raleigh International is a youth expedition organisation based in the UK. Raleigh runs overseas Expeditions for young people to work together on community, environmental and conservation projects around the world. The young people who participate in Raleigh Expeditions are known as ‘Venturers’.

Established in 1984 as Operation Raleigh, over 57,000 young people have been part of a Raleigh expedition.

== Raleigh International's work ==
Raleigh International operates in Costa Rica, South Africa and Borneo, with permanent offices in these countries. Long-term partnerships have been established with local communities, NGOs and government departments, ensuring projects are needed and sustainable. Past countries have included Chile, Ghana, Namibia, Malaysia, Mongolia and Fiji.

All volunteers are trained and supported to work alongside communities living in poverty. They work in remote, rural areas to improve access to safe water and sanitation, build community resilience, sustainably manage natural resources, and protect vulnerable environments. This is carried out in a number of ways, through raising awareness of health and hygiene, sustainable farming methods, as well as the construction of early childhood development centres, community buildings, rocket stoves and other infrastructure.

=== Expeditions ===
Raleigh International runs expeditions in Costa Rica, South Africa and Borneo for individuals aged 17–75, of any nationality or background. Venturers (aged 17–24) work on community and environmental projects as well as undertaking tough adventure challenges, and are supported by Venturer Managers (aged 25–75). Expeditions are 5, 7, or 10 weeks for Venturers and 8 or 13 weeks for Venturer Managers.

=== International Citizen Service ===
Raleigh ran an International Citizen Service (ICS) program which was funded by the UK government's Department for International Development and led by VSO in partnership with other respected development organizations. This programme is no longer offered.

== History ==
John Blashford-Snell and Prince Charles launched Operation Drake in 1978, running youth projects from ships circumnavigating the globe, to develop self-confidence and leadership through adventure, scientific exploration and community service. In two years 414 young people took part in the round the world voyage, working on land-based projects in 16 countries.

Following the success of Operation Drake, the much more ambitious Operation Raleigh was established in 1984, and ran for five years until 1989. Two renovated ships,Sir Walter Raleigh and Zebu, carried 4,000 volunteers and almost 1,600 staff to take part in expeditions around the world.

The success of Operation Raleigh saw it continue on a permanent basis in 1988, with an emphasis on land-based expeditions. It became Raleigh International in 1992, reflecting the growing diversity of expedition volunteers. In 1994, transworld walker Ffyona Campbell completed the last leg of her walk around the world, which ran from Dover to John O'Groats, with the logistical support of, and raising funds for, Raleigh International. Today over 57,000 people have been part of a Raleigh programme, and Raleigh continued to work with young people alongside communities living in poverty across the world.

On 19 May 2022 Raleigh International Trust ceased operations and entered Creditors' Voluntary Liquidation. The Raleigh International brand was bought by Impact Travel Group on 11 July 2022 and has relaunched with new expeditions in 2023.

== Alumni ==
Notable Raleigh alumni include:

- The Princess of Wales - Chile, 2001.
- The Prince of Wales - Chile, 2000.
- Tim Peake, astronaut with European Space Agency - Alaska, 1991.
- Kate Silverton, BBC News presenter - Operation Raleigh, 1990.
- Ray Mears, TV Bushcraft Instructor - Operation Raleigh.
- Simon Chinn, double Academy award-winning film producer - Panama, 1988.
- Claire Bertschinger, nurse and activist - Operation Drake, 1978.
