= John Blashford-Snell =

British explorer and author (born 1936)

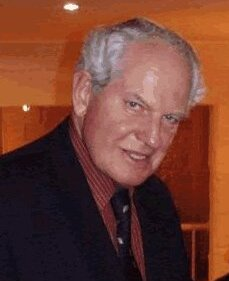
- Born: John Nicholas Blashford-Snell; 22 October 1936 (age 89); Hereford, Herefordshire, England
- Spouse: Judith Sherman (m. 1960)
- Children: 2
- Military career
- Allegiance: United Kingdom
- Branch: British Army
- Service years: 1954–1991
- Rank: Colonel
- Service number: 453555
- Unit: Royal Engineers
- Awards: Commander of the Order of the British Empire

Colonel John Nicholas Blashford-Snell CBE (born 22 October 1936) is a former British Army officer, explorer and author. He founded Operation Raleigh and the Scientific Exploration Society.

== Early life and education ==
John Nicholas Blashford-Snell was born on 22 October 1936 in Hereford, England, the son of Alderman the Reverend Leland John Blashford-Snell (1903–1978), MBE, Prebendary of Hereford Cathedral, and formerly of the Royal Army Chaplains' Department, and Gwendoline Ives Sadler. Blashford-Snell grew up in Herefordshire and Jersey and was educated at Victoria College, Jersey from 1950. Blashford-Snell joined the British Army and attended the Royal Military Academy Sandhurst as an officer cadet after which he was commissioned into the Royal Engineers on 2 August 1957.

== Military service ==
Having served his initial two years of his commission as a Second Lieutenant Blashford-Snell was promoted to the rank of Lieutenant on 2 August 1959 and then Captain after four years on 2 August 1963. Further promotion followed to the rank of Major on 31 December 1968 and Lieutenant Colonel on 30 June 1976 before reaching his final rank of Colonel on 30 June 1982. After 37 years of service, Blashford-Snell retired from the British Army on 30 December 1991.

He was the subject of This Is Your Life in 1976 when he was surprised by Eamonn Andrews.

== Expeditions ==
In 1969, Blashford-Snell founded the Scientific Exploration Society.

Amongst his expeditions were the first descent of the Blue Nile at the behest of Haile Selassie, crossing of the Darién Gap (1971 to 1972) and overseeing the first north–south vehicular journey from Alaska to Cape Horn; and a complete navigation of the Congo River (in 1974 to 1975). He was awarded the Segrave Trophy in 1974 and the Livingstone Medal by the Royal Scottish Geographical Society in recognition of his leadership of the expeditions.

In 1978, Blashford-Snell established Operation Drake, which later developed into Operation Raleigh, an educational initiative for young people, of which he was Director General until he retired from this post in 1991.

In 1993, Blashford-Snell was awarded the Patron's Medal of the Royal Geographical Society.

In 2006, Blashford-Snell helped the London hatmakers James Lock & Co. to design a hat to meet the needs of explorers. Since 2001, he has been the Hon. Life President of the Centre for Fortean Zoology. He is also a member of the Ghost Club. In 2010 he was made an Honorary Fellow of Liverpool John Moores University

His publications include an autobiography, Something Lost Behind the Ranges (1994).

Blashford-Snell has been a member of The Explorers Club since 1974. In 1992, he was awarded the Sweeney Medal in honour of his outstanding contributions to the welfare and objectives of the organization.

== Personal life ==
Blashford-Snell married Judith Sherman in 1960. They had met whilst Blashford-Snell was still at Sandhurst; Sherman was attending the women's officer training unit. They have two daughters.

== Works ==
- Where the Trails Run Out, London, Hutchinson 1974. ISBN 0091213606
- In the Steps of Stanley, London, Hutchison 1975. ISBN 0-09-125080-3
- Expeditions: the Experts' way, edited by John Blashford-Snell and Alistair Ballantine. London, Faber 1977. ISBN 0-571-11116-5
- A taste for adventure, London, Hutchinson 1978. ISBN 0-09-136010-2
- In the wake of Drake, John Blashford-Snell and Michael Cable. London, W.H. Allen 1980. ISBN 0-352-30750-1
- Operation Drake, London, W.H. Allen 1981. ISBN 0-491-02965-9
- The expedition organiser’s guide by John Blashford-Snell & Richard Snailham; written for the Scientific Exploration Society. London, The Daily Telegraph, 1982.
- Mysteries: encounter with the unexplained, London, Bodley Head 1983. ISBN 0-370-30479-9
- Operation Raleigh: the start of an adventure, London, Collins 1987. ISBN 0-00-217624-6
- Something lost behind the ranges: The autobiography of John Blashford-Snell, London, HarperCollins 1994. ISBN 0-00-255034-2
- Mammoth hunt: In search of the giant elephants of Nepal by John Blashford-Snell and Rula Lenska. London, HarperCollins 1996. ISBN 0-00-255672-3
- Kota Mama: retracing the lost trade routes of ancient South American peoples by John Blashford-Snell and Richard Snailham. London, Headline 2000. ISBN 0-7472-2281-9
- East to the Amazon: in search of Great Paititi and the trade routes of the ancients by John Blashford-Snell and Richard Snailham. London, John Murray 2002. ISBN 0-7195-6032-2
- From Utmost East to Utmost West. Bradt 2022 ISBN 978-1784778446
