= Platform2 =

- Formation: 2007
- Type: Government funded, not-for-profit scheme
- Headquarters: London
- Region served: United Kingdom
- Official language: English
- Parent organization: Christian Aid; BUNAC
- Affiliations: DFID funded
- Budget: £10 million over 3 years
- Volunteers: 2,500
- Website: www.myplatform2.com

Platform2 was an international volunteering programme for young people in the United Kingdom. It was run by a coalition of Christian Aid and BUNAC, and was funded by the Department for International Development of the UK government. Volunteers took part in 10-week community projects in countries such as South Africa, Ghana, India, Nepal and Peru.

== What was Platform2? ==
Platform2 was an international volunteering scheme for 18- to 25-year-olds from the UK who wouldn't otherwise be able to afford to visit a developing country and get involved with global issues of justice and poverty. It was funded by UKaid from the Department for International Development and run by Christian Aid and BUNAC.

Platform2 sent volunteers to India, Nepal, Ghana, Kenya, South Africa or Peru for 10 weeks in an attempt to improve both the living conditions of communities in the developing world but also volunteers' understanding of the issues surrounding development and poverty.

== Who was Platform2? ==
Platform2 was funded by The Department for International Development (DFID) and is the part of the UK government that manages Britain's aid to poor countries and works to get rid of extreme poverty.

Platform2's UK operations were run by Christian Aid which is a development agency with a mission to expose the scandal of poverty, help the poorest of the poor and work to change the structures which give rise to poverty and promote sustainable development. It works with people of all and no faiths, and has a track record in the UK of working both within and without faith settings.

Platform2's overseas operations was run by BUNAC, a provider of volunteering and work abroad opportunities. BUNAC is a not for profit company and its primary objective is to encourage interest and understanding in overseas cultures among British students and young people; and to encourage interest and understanding in Britain among students and young people who travel to Britain on reciprocal programmes.

== See also ==
- Christian Aid
- Department for International Development
