= White squall =

Sudden and violent windstorm at sea not accompanied by black clouds

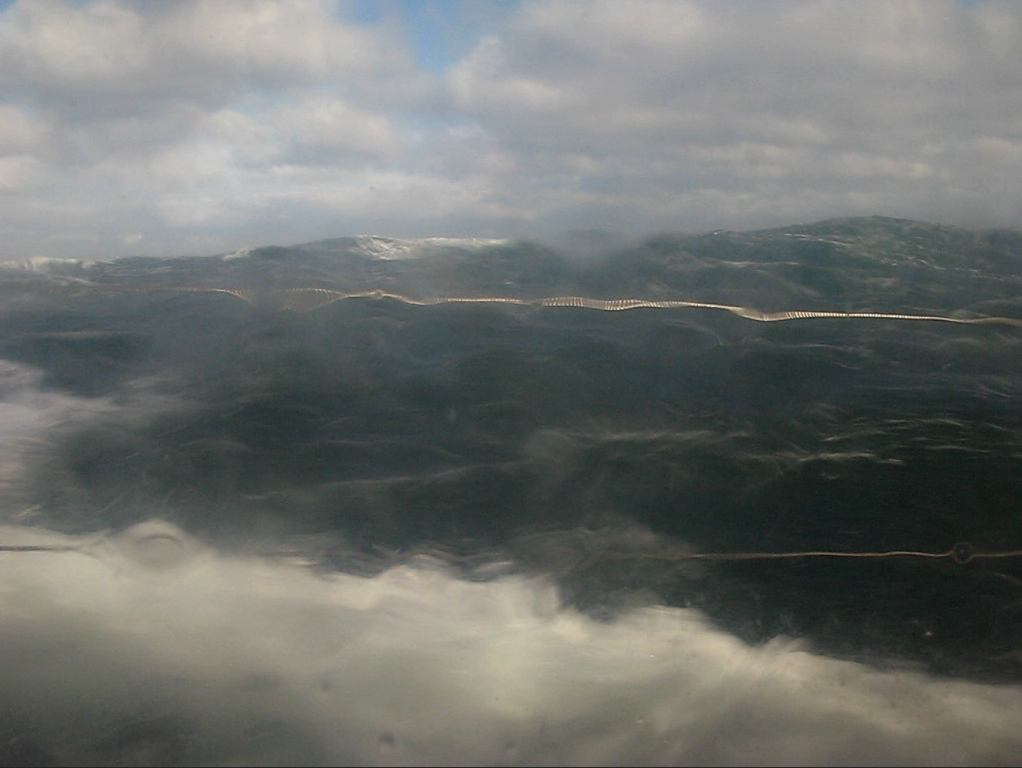
A white squall on 25 October 2009 in the Strait of Magellan

A white squall is a sudden and violent windstorm at sea which is not accompanied by the black clouds generally characteristic of a squall. It manifests as a sudden increase in wind velocity in tropical and sub-tropical waters, and may be a microburst. The name refers to the white-capped waves and broken water, its meager warning to any unlucky seaman caught in its path. A white squall was allegedly behind the sinking of the brigantine Albatross on May 2, 1961 although, in fact, there were a number of traditional line squalls all around and a microburst was very unlikely. White squalls are rare at sea, but common on the Great Lakes of North America.

== Historical incidents ==
White squalls are the culprits of many sea stories and have been blamed for a few tragedies. A white squall was the reported cause of the loss of the schooner Paul Pry off Cape Schanck, Australia, on September 3, 1841. In May 1986, the Pride of Baltimore, a modern 137-foot (42 m) schooner, was reportedly struck by a white squall. The 121-ton vessel sank about 240 miles (390 km) north of Puerto Rico, casting the surviving crew members adrift for five days. The Toro, a Norwegian freighter, picked them up at 2:30 a.m. May 19, 1986. An eyewitness account described it as follows:

"A tremendous whistling sound suddenly roared through the rigging and a wall of wind hit us in the back. The Pride heeled over in a matter of seconds. The 70-knot (130 km/h) wind pushed a 20-foot (6.1 m) high wall of water into the starboard side. She sank in minutes."

== In literature and the arts ==
- In Patrick O'Brian's 1973 novel HMS Surprise a white squall is experienced by the crew of Surprise en route to the Malay Peninsula north of the equator off the Saint Peter and Saint Paul Archipelago near Brazil.
- Stan Rogers' 1984 song "White Squall" is about the white squalls of the Great Lakes.
- Ridley Scott's 1996 film White Squall tells the story of the 1961 sinking of the Albatross.

== See also ==
- Rogue wave
- Microburst
- Meteotsunami
