= Restless Development =

Organization focused on developing young leaders

- Formation: 1985
- Founder: Jim Cogan
- Headquarters: United Kingdom
- Co-CEOs: Alex Kent & Kate Muhwezi
- Website: www.restlessdevelopment.org

Restless Development, formerly known as Students Partnership Worldwide (SPW) is a non-governmental organization which organizes volunteer placements for young people in the areas of civic participation, livelihoods and employment, sexual rights, and leadership. It operates in Africa and Asia, as well as the United States and United Kingdom.

== History ==
Restless Development was founded as Students Partnership Worldwide in 1985 by Jim Cogan, the Deputy Head of Westminster School. It was originally a gap year programme for school leavers from Westminster School to work as teachers in India or Zimbabwe.

In 2010, SPW re-branded as Restless Development, and in 2011 joined the consortium of organizations for the International Citizen Service, a program funded by the UK Department for International Development (DFID), providing overseas volunteer placements for young people to work alongside national volunteers.

From 2011 to 2016, Restless Development led a 'Youth Consortium' involving Warchild and Youth Business International that held a Programme Partnership Arrangement (PPA) with DFID.

== Restless Development's work ==
Since 2012, Restless Development has been in consultative status with the United Nations Economic and Social Council.

From 2014 to 2016, Restless Development was Organising Partner of the United Nations Major Group for Children and Youth (MGCY).

== See also ==
- Think Global (charity)
