= Brigantine =

Two-masted sailing vessel

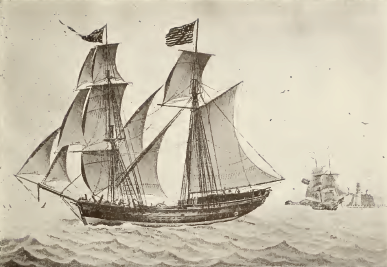
- Brigantine Experiment, 114 tons, built at Amesbury, Massachusetts, in 1803
- Type: Sailing rig
- Place of origin: Atlantic maritime nations

A brigantine is a two-masted sailing vessel with a fully square-rigged foremast and at least two sails on the main mast: a square topsail and a gaff mainsail. The main mast is the second and taller of the two masts.

Older usages are looser; in addition to the rigorous definition above (attested from 1695), the Oxford English Dictionary includes two c. 1525 definitions: "a small vessel equipped both for sailing and rowing, swifter and more easily manœuvred than larger ships" and "(loosely) various kinds of foreign sailing and rowing vessels, as the galleon, galliot, etc."

Modern American definitions include vessels without any square sail(s) on the main mast.

== Mediterranean brigantines ==
In the Mediterranean Basin during the 13th century, a brigantine referred to a sail- and oar-driven war vessel. It was lateen rigged on two masts and had between eight and twelve oars on each side. Its speed, maneuverability, and ease of handling made it a favourite of Mediterranean pirates. Its name is derived from the Italian word brigantino, which in turn is derived from brigante "brigand". Other than in names, this vessel has no relation to the later brigantines developed in Northern Europe.

== 17th century and onwards ==
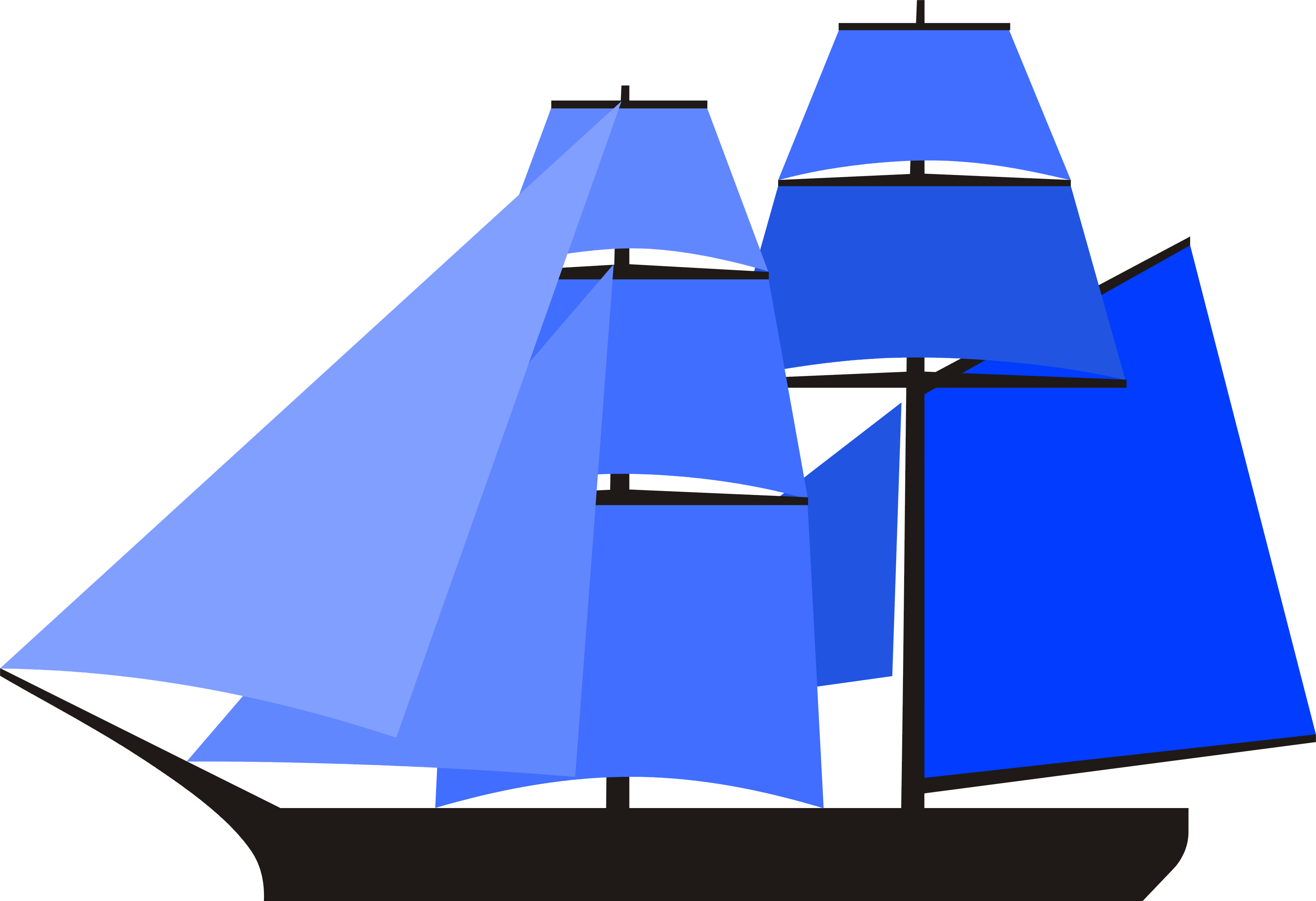
A brigantine sail plan

By the 17th century, the term was adopted by Atlantic maritime nations. The vessel had no lateen sails, but was instead square-rigged on the foremast and had a gaff-rigged mainsail with square rig above it on the mainmast. The mainmast of a brigantine is the aft one.

By the first half of the 18th century, the word had evolved to refer not to a kind of vessel, but rather to a particular type of rigging: two-masted, with her foremast fully square-rigged and her mainmast rigged with both a fore-and-aft mainsail (a gaff sail) and square topsails and possibly topgallant sails.

The brigantine was the second-most popular rig for ships built in the British colonies in North America before 1775, after the sloop. The brigantine was swifter and more easily maneuvered than a sloop or schooner, hence was employed for piracy, espionage, and reconnoitering, and as an outlying attendant upon large ships for protecting a ship, or for supply or landing purposes in a fleet.

The brigantine could be of various sizes, ranging from 30 to 150 tons burden. The brigantine was generally larger than a sloop or schooner, but smaller than a brig.

== Modern terminology ==
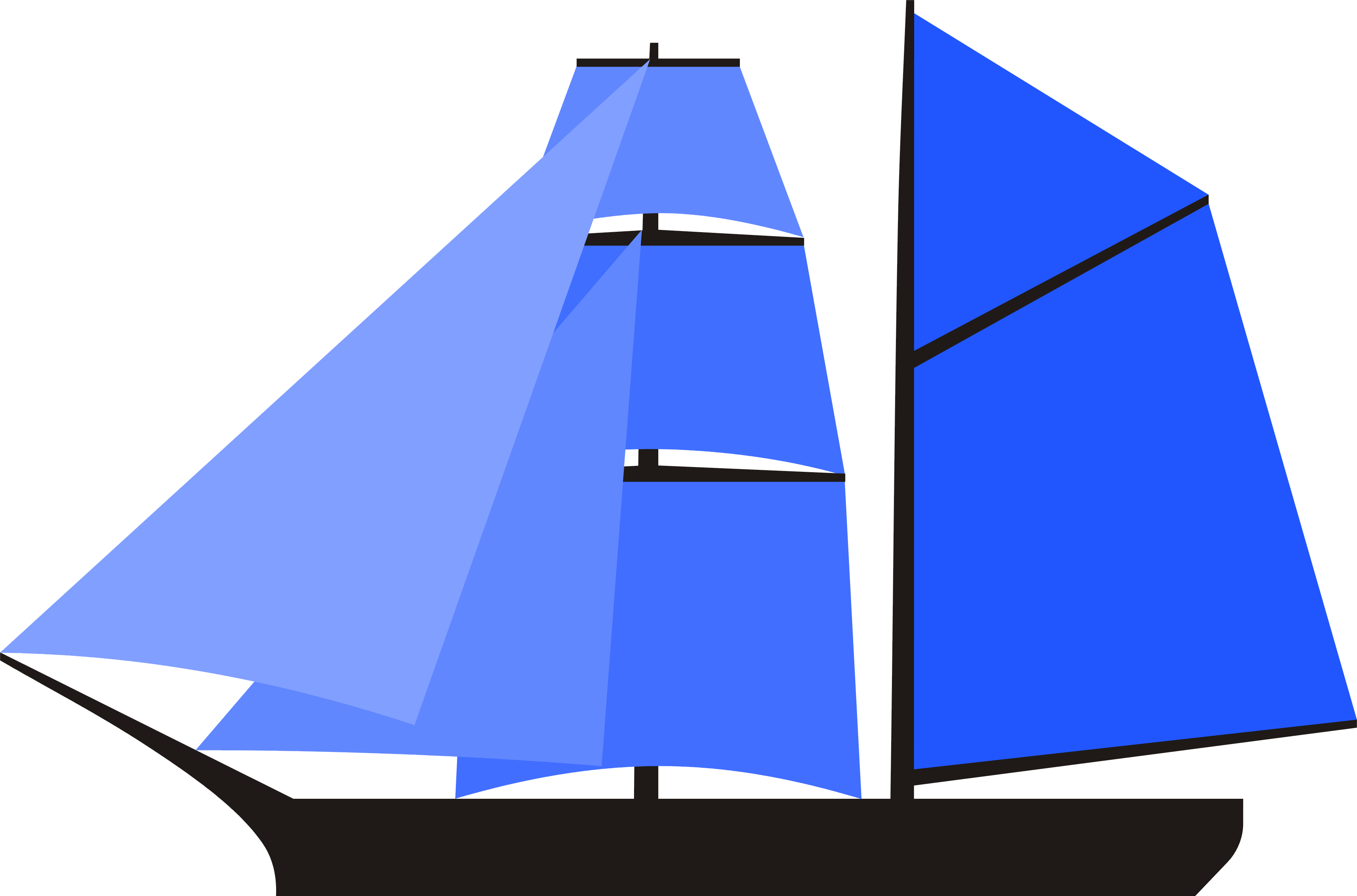
A modern brigantine sail plan or "hermaphrodite brig"

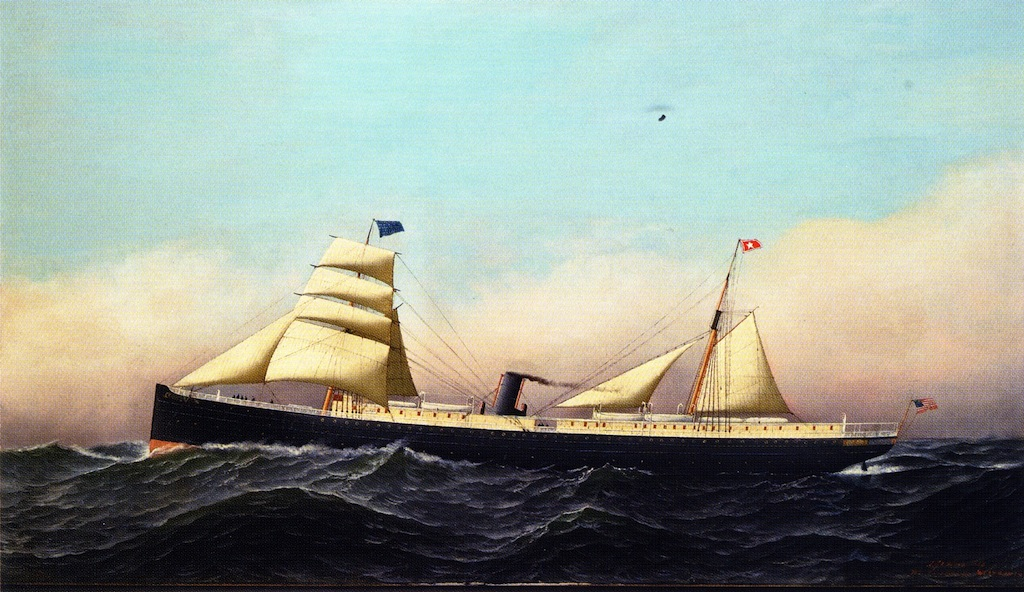
The steamship Columbia, an example of a late 19th-century brig-rigged vessel

The definition given above describes the international usage of the term brigantine. In modern American terminology, the term brigantine usually means a vessel with the foremast square rigged and the mainmast fore-and-aft rigged, without any square sails. Historically, this rig used was called a "schooner brig" or "hermaphrodite brig". In Europe, the distinction is typically still made. The training ship Zebu, which circumnavigated the Earth in the mid-1980s as part of Operation Raleigh, is an example of a schooner brig.

== Differences from brig ==
The word brig is an 18th-century shortening of the word brigantine, but to mean a different type of rigging. The gaff-rigged mainsail on a brigantine distinguishes it from the brig, which is principally square-rigged on both masts. In addition to the different sail configuration, the brigantine's mainmast is made from two parts and equal to that of a schooner, a quite long mast and a top mast. The mainmast of a brig is made from three parts and equal to that of a fully rigged ship - a mast, topmast, and topgallant mast. With the advent of modern (metal) pole masts, this last difference typically no longer exists.

== See also ==
- Snow (ship)
- Brig (ship)
