= Doctor in the House (franchise) =

British & Australian TV sitcom series

- Based on: Doctor series by Richard Gordon
- Starring: Barry Evans; Robin Nedwell; Geoffrey Davies; George Layton; Ernest Clark; Richard O'Sullivan
- Countries of origin: United Kingdom; Australia
- No. of series: 10
- No. of episodes: 157

Production
- Running time: 30 minutes
- Production companies: LWT (1969–1977); Seven Network (1979); BBC (1991)

Original release
- Network: ITV
- Release: 12 July 1969 – 10 April 1977
- Network: Channel Seven
- Release: 12 February – 10 May 1979
- Network: BBC1
- Release: 21 February – 4 April 1991

Doctor in the House is a collective name for seven separate British and Australian television comedy series inspired by the "Doctor" books of English author Richard Gordon. The books had also previously been adapted as a series of cinema films. The television versions were less directly based on the Gordon books than was the film series, but were instead half-hour sitcoms chronicling the misadventures of a group of medical students, and their later checkered careers as doctors.

The first five series, Doctor in the House, Doctor at Large, Doctor in Charge, Doctor at Sea and Doctor on the Go, were produced by London Weekend Television between 1969 and 1977. The sixth series, Doctor Down Under, which was filmed and based in Australia, was produced by Australia's Seven Network in 1979. The final series, Doctor at the Top, was produced by the British Broadcasting Corporation in 1991. The series were broadcast under their individual titles in the U.K. and in some British Commonwealth countries. In the U.S. and Canada, where the Richard Gordon books were less well-known, episodes from the first five series were all syndicated under the original Doctor in the House title.

The same theme music — "Bond Street Parade" by Alan Tew — was used for all of the "Doctor" television series, including the Australian series Doctor Down Under.

== Characters ==
The television series employed a set of characters completely different from the original book series (the film and radio series used the characters from the books).

The major protagonists were:

- Michael Upton (Barry Evans), an easy-going, serious and somewhat anxious son of a doctor who is essentially following in his father's footsteps. Upton was the central character of the first two series, but Barry Evans left the show following Doctor at Large.
- Duncan Waring (Robin Nedwell), Michael's best friend and roommate. He is just as bright as Upton, but far less serious in his studies, although he generally does well. After Barry Evans left the show, Nedwell returned as Waring to become the focus of the show. Duncan Waring appears in all of the series except Doctor at Large, and is the main protagonist of the last five.
- Dick Stuart-Clark (Geoffrey Davies), a thirtyish student who deliberately fails his courses in order to take advantage of his late grandmother's will, which bequeathed him a large sum of money for each year he is in medical school. He later becomes an anesthetist who prefers partying and chasing women to his medical duties. Dick Stuart-Clark is the only character present throughout all seven series. Davies and Nedwell essentially became a double act in many of the later episodes of the franchise.
- Paul Collier (George Layton), a less competent student and friend of Upton and Waring. His character left the series after Doctor in Charge, but Layton continued to write scripts for the subsequent series, and reprised the Collier character for the later BBC series Doctor at the Top.
- Lawrence Bingham (Richard O'Sullivan), a brilliant, but arrogant and irritating doctor who believes he is the best of all possible doctors. He marries the equally obnoxious Dr. Mary Parsons (Helen Fraser) in the series Doctor in Charge. His need to continually impress her is the source of much comedy. O'Sullivan departed after Doctor in Charge to star in Man About the House

The main antagonist is the well-respected and ill-tempered surgeon Professor (later Sir) Geoffrey Loftus (Ernest Clark). Many of the plot lines revolve around the students' attempts to meet his demanding expectations. Another hospital official with whom the students have contact is the Dean (Ralph Michael), who is more interested in the hospital's Rugby union team than he is in medicine.

Other characters in the early episodes, some of whom later reappeared for single episodes in subsequent series, include:

- Danny Hooley (Jonathan Lynn), an Irish medical student who is a friend of Waring, Collier, Upton and Stuart-Clark. He later returns as an 'out-of-work doctor' in the Doctor in Charge episode "Should Auld Acquaintance be Forgot?"
- Huw Evans (Martin Shaw), a Welsh medical student, another friend of the four students. He reappears as a very nervous expectant father in the episode "Mother and Father Doing Well".
- Dave Briddock (Simon Cuff), another friend of the students. He spends part of the series living with Helga, his Swedish girlfriend.

== Guest stars ==
Notable guest stars throughout the run of the series and its sequels included:

Hattie Jacques, Mollie Sugden, Roy Kinnear, Maureen Lipman, Patricia Routledge, Graeme Garden, David Jason, John Le Mesurier, Arthur Lowe, Angela Scoular, Tessa Wyatt and John Bluthal.

== Series ==
- Doctor in the House — (1969–1970) — London Weekend Television (LWT)
  - First series (13 episodes) broadcast from 12 July to 4 October 1969
  - Second series (13 episodes) broadcast from 10 April to 3 July 1970
- Doctor at Large — (1971) — LWT
  - Third series (29 episodes) broadcast from 28 February to 12 September 1971
- Doctor in Charge — (1972–1973) — LWT
  - Fourth series (27 episodes) broadcast from 9 April to 8 October 1972
  - Fifth series (16 episodes) broadcast from 15 September to 29 December 1973
- Doctor at Sea — (1974) — LWT
  - Sixth series (13 episodes) broadcast from 21 April to 14 July 1974
- Doctor on the Go — (1975–1977) — LWT
  - Seventh series (13 episodes) broadcast from 27 April to 20 July 1975
  - Eighth series (13 episodes) broadcast from 16 January to 10 April 1977
- Doctor Down Under — (1979) — Seven Network (Australia)
  - Ninth series (13 episodes) broadcast from 12 February 1979 to 10 May 1979
- Doctor at the Top — (1991) — BBC
  - Tenth series (7 episodes) broadcast from 21 February to 4 April 1991

== Writers ==
Unusually for a British situation comedy series Doctor in the House did not depend on a single writer or partnership to write the scripts. The writers who worked on the series are often better known for their other work. Monty Python's Graham Chapman and John Cleese and The Goodies Graeme Garden and Bill Oddie were among the regular writers. Chapman and Garden both trained as doctors. Graeme Garden also appeared as a "Television Presenter" in the episode "Doctor on the Box".

While keeping mostly to the conventions of the situation comedy genre, the shows occasionally stretched the boundaries of what was seen on television. One script by Cleese called for Michael Upton to rip away a woman's dress in a single movement (she was hiding a key he needed in her cleavage). Another featured a stripper collapsing on stage mid-act with suspected pneumonia. A script by Garden and Oddie included a scene played out using cartoon drawings of the performers, in the style of a teenage romance magazine, while the actors voiced their lines.

| Title of series | Number of episodes | Writers |
|---|---|---|
| Doctor in the House | 26 | Graham Chapman, John Cleese, Barry Cryer, Graeme Garden, Bernard McKenna and Bill Oddie |
| Doctor at Large | 29 | Graham Chapman, John Cleese, Barry Cryer, Graeme Garden, Bill Oddie, Jonathan Lynn, Bernard McKenna, David Yallop, George Layton (under the pseudonym of "Oliver Fry"), Geoff Rowley and Andy Baker. |
| Doctor in Charge | 43 | David Askey, Graham Chapman, Graeme Garden, George Layton, Jonathan Lynn, Bernard McKenna, Bill Oddie, Phil Redmond and Gail Renard |
| Doctor at Sea | 13 | Richard Laing, George Layton, Jonathan Lynn, Bernard McKenna, Gail Renard and Phil Redmond |
| Doctor on the Go | 26 | Douglas Adams, Rob Buckman, Richard Laing, George Layton, Jonathan Lynn, Bernard McKenna, Steve Thorn and Paul Wolfson |
| Doctor Down Under | 13 | Bernard McKenna, Bernie Sharp and Jon Watkins |
| Doctor at the Top | 7 | George Layton and Bill Oddie |

== Location of St. Swithin's Hospital ==
The building used as the fictional St. Swithin's Hospital is, in fact, the old Wanstead Hospital (based in Wanstead, London, E11). A number of years ago it was converted into a residential building and is now called Clock Court. It is a listed building based on Hermon Hill, within the London Borough of Redbridge. Before becoming a hospital it was an orphanage for children whose parents were lost at sea, and the architecture of the building depicts images of boats carved into the intricate stone. A number of celebrities are rumoured to have lived there over the years including the actor Gary Lucy (The Bill), and Heart FM radio DJ Paul Hollins.

== International telecasts ==
=== Australia ===
The show proved to be very popular in Australia, where the series Doctor Down Under was filmed and based.

=== North America ===
During the 1970s and 1980s, the five London Weekend Television series were syndicated in the United States and Canada by Group W Productions. The umbrella title Doctor in the House was used for all shows, and episodes from different series were sometimes shown out of sequence. The episodes appeared on both commercial and Public Broadcasting Service stations.

== DVD Release ==
The five London Weekend Television series were released complete on a Granada Network 20-disc box set entitled Doctor on the Box in 2009. As of 2024, the set is available only from third-party resellers.

== Notes ==
British doctors study medicine at the undergraduate level, so the characters were new to independent living and university life.

Ernest Clark, who played the part of Professor Loftus in the television series, also appeared in the original film version of Doctor in the House. He also played the part of Prof. Sir Loftus' identical twin brother, Capt. Norman Loftus, heading the cruise ship in Doctor at Sea.

A 1981 ITV series Doctors' Daughters was not directly related to the Doctor in the House TV franchise. This series was written by Richard Gordon, the author of the original "Doctor" books, adapted from his 1981 novel of the same title, and shared no characters or cast members with the main TV franchise. The series was not well-received and was cancelled after six episodes.
