= Doctor on the Go =

British TV sitcom (ITV, 1975–77)

- First series opening title, 1975
- Created by: Richard Gordon
- Starring: Robin Nedwell; Geoffrey Davies; Ernest Clark
- Country of origin: United Kingdom
- Original language: English
- No. of series: 2
- No. of episodes: 26

Production
- Producer: Humphrey Barclay
- Running time: 25 minutes
- Production company: London Weekend Television

Original release
- Network: ITV
- Release: 27 April 1975 – 10 April 1977

Related
- Doctor at Sea; Doctor Down Under

Doctor on the Go is a British television comedy series, the fifth of seven series in a franchise that began with Doctor in the House and was inspired by the "Doctor" books by Richard Gordon. The series follows directly from its predecessor Doctor at Sea as Duncan Waring and Dick Stuart-Clark finish their cruise ship jobs and return to the familiar surroundings of St. Swithin's hospital. It was the final series to be produced by London Weekend Television. The two series ran from 1975 to 1977.

Writers for the Doctor on the Go episodes included Bernard McKenna, Rob Buckman, Richard Laing, George Layton, Jonathan Lynn, Steve Thorn, Gail Renard, David Yallop, Selwyn Roberts, Chris Beetles, Brenda Crankman and Paul Wolfson. One episode ("For Your Own Good") was co-written by Douglas Adams and Graham Chapman.

== Cast ==
- Robin Nedwell - Dr Duncan Waring
- Geoffrey Davies - Dr Dick Stuart-Clark
- Ernest Clark - Professor Sir Geoffrey Loftus
- Andrew Knox - Dr James Gascoigne
- John Kane - Dr Andrew MacKenzie
- Jacquie-Ann Carr - Dr Katherine Wright

== Series overview ==
Series	Episodes	Originally released	
Series	Episodes	First released	Last released
1	13	27 April 1975	20 July 1975
2	13	16 January 1977	10 April 1977

== Episodes ==
=== Series 1 (1975) ===
No. overall	No. in series	Title	Written by	Original release date
1	1	"Keep Your Nose Clean"	George Layton and Jonathan Lynn	27 April 1975
2	2	"When a Body Meets a Body"	George Layton and Jonathan Lynn	4 May 1975
3	3	"It's the Thought That Counts"	George Layton and Jonathan Lynn	11 May 1975
4	4	"Radio Activity"	Bernard McKenna and Richard Laing	18 May 1975
5	5	"A Run for Your Money"	Bernard McKenna and Richard Laing	25 May 1975
6	6	"Learning by Heart"	Bernard McKenna and Richard Laing	1 June 1975
7	7	"It's Just the Job"	Bernard McKenna and Richard Laing	8 June 1975
8	8	"What's Op Doc?"	Gail Renard	15 June 1975
9	9	"Room for Change"	Bernard McKenna and Richard Laing	22 June 1975
10	10	"A Heart in the Right Place"	Paul Wolfson and Steve Thorn	29 June 1975
11	11	"What's Your Problem?"	Bernard McKenna and Richard Laing	6 July 1975
12	12	"Clunk Click"	George Layton and Jonathan Lynn	13 July 1975
13	13	"The Course of True Love"	George Layton and Jonathan Lynn	20 July 1975

=== Series 2 (1977) ===
No. overall	No. in series	Title	Written by	Original release date
14	1	"When Did You Last See Your Mother?"	David Yallop	16 January 1977
15	2	"I Love Paris... When I Get There"	Paul Wolfson and Steve Thorn	23 January 1977
16	3	"Money Spasms"	Selwyn Roberts	30 January 1977
17	4	"What's in a Name?"	Bernard McKenna	6 February 1977
18	5	"The War of the Wards"	Paul Wolfson and Steve Thorn	13 February 1977
19	6	"For Your Own Good"	Douglas Adams and Graham Chapman	20 February 1977
20	7	"Bunny Makes the World Go Round"	Chris Beetles and Rob Buckman	27 February 1977
21	8	"Loftus the Terrible"	Bernard McKenna	6 March 1977
22	9	"A Turn for the Nurse"	Brenda Crankman and Gail Renard	13 March 1977
23	10	"M*A*T*C*H"	Chris Beetles and Rob Buckman	20 March 1977
24	11	"California Girl"	Paul Wolfson and Steve Thorn	27 March 1977
25	12	"Sunday Bleeping Sunday"	Chris Beetles and Rob Buckman	3 April 1977
26	13	"Happy Ever After"	Bernard McKenna	10 April 1977

== Cultural and social impact ==
Jamaican reggae group The Upsetters recorded a song called "Doctor on the Go" containing sound clips from the show for their 1975 album Revolution Dub.
