= Doctor in Charge =

British TV sitcom (ITV, 1972–73)

- First series opening title, 1972
- Starring: Robin Nedwell; Richard O'Sullivan; Geoffrey Davies; George Layton; Ernest Clark
- Country of origin: United Kingdom
- Original language: English
- No. of series: 2
- No. of episodes: 43

Production
- Running time: 25 minutes
- Production company: London Weekend

Original release
- Network: ITV
- Release: 9 April 1972 – 29 December 1973

Related
- Doctor at Large; Doctor at Sea

Doctor in Charge is a British television comedy series, the third of seven series in a franchise that began with Doctor in the House and was inspired by the "Doctor" books by Richard Gordon. The series follows directly from its predecessor Doctor at Large and depicts the former medical students now working as staff doctors at their alma mater St. Swithin's. It was produced by London Weekend Television and broadcast on ITV during 1972 and 1973. Barry Evans, who starred in the first two series, did not return for this series, with the result that Robin Nedwell as Dr Duncan Waring became the central character of this and all remaining series in the franchise.

Doctor in Charge was the longest of all the Doctor series, featuring 43 episodes over two series. Ratings for this series were high and featured regularly in the top 10 programmes on ITV.

Writers for the Doctor in Charge episodes were David Askey, Graham Chapman, Graeme Garden, George Layton, Jonathan Lynn, Bernard McKenna, Bill Oddie, Phil Redmond and Gail Renard.

== Cast ==
- Robin Nedwell – Dr Duncan Waring
- Richard O'Sullivan – Dr Lawrence Bingham
- George Layton – Dr Paul Collier
- Geoffrey Davies – Dr Dick Stuart-Clark
- Ernest Clark – Professor Geoffrey Loftus
- Helen Fraser – Dr. Mary Bingham
- Sammie Winmill – Nurse Sandra Crumpton
- Joan Benham – Mrs. Elizabeth Loftus

== Series overview ==
Series	Episodes	Originally released	
Series	Episodes	First released	Last released
1	27	9 April 1972	8 October 1972
2	16	15 September 1973	29 December 1973

== Episodes ==
=== Series 1 (1972) ===
No. overall	No. in series	Title	Directed by	Written by	Original release date
1	1	"The Devil You Know"	Alan Wallis	Graham Chapman and Bernard McKenna	9 April 1972
2	2	"The Research Unit"	Alan Wallis	Graham Chapman and Bernard McKenna	16 April 1972
3	3	"The Minister's Health"	Alan Wallis	Bernard McKenna and Graham Chapman	23 April 1972
4	4	"The Black and White Medical Show"	Alan Wallis	Graeme Garden and Bill Oddie	30 April 1972
5	5	"Honeylamb"	Alan Wallis	Graeme Garden and Bill Oddie	7 May 1972
6	6	"Doctors' Lib"	Alan Wallis	Graeme Garden and Bill Oddie	14 May 1972
7	7	"Which Doctor?"	David Askey	George Layton and Jonathan Lynn	21 May 1972
8	8	"Climbing the Ladder"	Alan Wallis	Graeme Garden and Bill Oddie	28 May 1972
9	9	"Face the Music"	David Askey	George Layton and Jonathan Lynn	4 June 1972
10	10	"Mum's the Word"	Alan Wallis	Bernard McKenna with Graham Chapman	11 June 1972
11	11	"The Fox"	Alan Wallis	Bernard McKenna with Graham Chapman	18 June 1972
12	12	"A Night with the Dead"	Alan Wallis	Bernard McKenna with Graham Chapman	25 June 1972
13	13	"This is Your Wife"	Alan Wallis	Graham Chapman and Bernard McKenna	2 July 1972
14	14	"Honeymoon Special"	David Askey	Graeme Garden and Bill Oddie	9 July 1972
15	15	"The Long, Long Night"	David Askey	Graeme Garden and Bill Oddie	16 July 1972
16	16	"The System"	David Askey	Graham Chapman and Bernard McKenna	23 July 1972
17	17	"On the Brink"	David Askey	Graeme Garden and Bill Oddie	30 July 1972
18	18	"Amazing Grace"	David Askey	Graham Chapman and Bernard McKenna	6 August 1972
19	19	"Shut Up and Eat What You're Given"	David Askey	George Layton and Jonathan Lynn	13 August 1972
20	20	"Yellow Fever"	Alan Wallis	Graham Chapman and Bernard McKenna	20 August 1972
21	21	"The Taming of the Wolf"	Bill Turner	Graeme Garden and Bill Oddie	27 August 1972
22	22	"An Officer and a Gentleman"	Alan Wallis	George Layton and Jonathan Lynn	3 September 1972
23	23	"That's My Uncle!"	Bill Turner	Bernard McKenna with Graham Chapman	10 September 1972
24	24	"The Big Match"	Alan Wallis	Graeme Garden and Bill Oddie	17 September 1972
25	25	"The Rumour"	Bill Turner	George Layton and Jonathan Lynn	24 September 1972
26	26	"Blackmail"	David Boisseau	Bernard McKenna and Graham Chapman	1 October 1972
27	27	"Long Day's Journey into Knighthood"	Bill Turner	George Layton and Jonathan Lynn	8 October 1972

=== Series 2 (1973) ===
No. overall	No. in series	Title	Directed by	Written by	Original release date
28	1	"The Merger"	Maurice Murphy	Graham Chapman and David Sherlock	15 September 1973
29	2	"Men Without Women"	Alan Wallis	Bernard McKenna	22 September 1973
30	3	"A Deep Depression Centred Over St. Swithin's"	Maurice Murphy	George Layton and Jonathan Lynn	29 September 1973
31	4	"The Epidemic"	Bryan Izzard	Phil Redmond	6 October 1973
32	5	"The Garden Fête"	Maurice Murphy	Phil Redmond	13 October 1973
33	6	"Brotherly Hate"	Maurice Murphy	George Layton and Jonathan Lynn	20 October 1973
34	7	"The Loftus Papers"	Alan Wallis	George Layton and Jonathan Lynn	27 October 1973
35	8	"In Place of Strife"	Alan Wallis	Bernard McKenna	3 November 1973
36	9	"The Pool"	Maurice Murphy	David Askey	10 November 1973
37	10	"The Godfather"	Bill Turner	Gail Renard	17 November 1973
38	11	"A Man's Best Friend is His Cat"	Alan Wallis	George Layton and Jonathan Lynn	24 November 1973
39	12	"There's No Fire Without Smoke"	Alan Wallis	Bernard McKenna	1 December 1973
40	13	"Hello Sailor!"	Alan Wallis	Graham Chapman and David Sherlock	8 December 1973
41	14	"Any Complaints?"	Alan Wallis	Phil Redmond	15 December 1973
42	15	"Watch Out – There's a Thief About!"	Bill Turner	Bernard McKenna	22 December 1973
43	16	"Should Auld Acquaintance Be Forgot?"	Bill Turner	George Layton and Jonathan Lynn	29 December 1973
