= Doctor at Sea (TV series) =

British sitcom (ITV, 1974)

- Opening title
- Created by: Richard Gordon
- Starring: Robin Nedwell; Geoffrey Davies; Ernest Clark
- Country of origin: United Kingdom
- Original language: English
- No. of series: 1
- No. of episodes: 13

Production
- Producer: Humphrey Barclay
- Running time: 25 minutes
- Production company: London Weekend

Original release
- Network: ITV
- Release: 21 April – 14 July 1974

Related
- Doctor in Charge; Doctor on the Go

Doctor at Sea is a British television comedy series, the fourth of seven series in a franchise that began with Doctor in the House and was inspired by the "Doctor" books by Richard Gordon. The series follows Duncan Waring and Dick Stuart-Clark from its predecessor Doctor in Charge as they leave their jobs at St. Swithin's and sign on as ship's physicians on a Mediterranean cruise ship. It was produced by London Weekend Television in 1974.

Although each of its predecessors had longer runs, Doctor at Sea was limited to a single series of thirteen episodes.

Writers for the Doctor at Sea episodes were Richard Laing, George Layton, Jonathan Lynn, Bernard McKenna, Gail Renard and Phil Redmond.

== Cast ==
- Robin Nedwell - Dr Duncan Waring
- Geoffrey Davies - Dr Dick Stuart-Clark
- Ernest Clark - Captain Norman Loftus, brother of Sir Geoffrey Loftus in the other series, also played by Ernest Clark
- John Grieve - Purser
- Elizabeth Counsell - Nurse Joyce Wynton

== Episodes ==
No.	Title	Directed by	Written by	Original release date
1	"Sir John and Baby Doc"	David Askey	Gail Renard and Phil Redmond	21 April 1974
2	"Oh I Do Like to Be Beside the Sea Sick"	David Askey	Bernard McKenna and Richard Laing	28 April 1974
3	"A Healthy Ship is a Happy Ship"	David Askey	George Layton and Jonathan Lynn	5 May 1974
4	"The Senior Officer's Perks"	David Askey	George Layton and Jonathan Lynn	12 May 1974
5	"Go Away Stowaway!"	David Askey	Bernard McKenna and Richard Laing	19 May 1974
6	"Floating Profits"	Alan Wallis	Bernard McKenna and Richard Laing	26 May 1974
7	"Goodbye Mr. Ships!"	David Askey	Gail Renard	2 June 1974
8	"The V.I.P."	David Askey	George Layton and Jonathan Lynn	9 June 1974
9	"In a Little Spanish Town"	Alan Wallis	George Layton and Jonathan Lynn	16 June 1974
10	"Physician, Heal Thyself"	Alan Wallis	George Layton and Jonathan Lynn	23 June 1974
11	"A Wolf in Ship's Clothing"	Alan Wallis	Bernard McKenna and Richard Laing	30 June 1974
12	"Murder! He Said"	Alan Wallis	Bernard McKenna and Richard Laing	7 July 1974
13	"But It's So Much Nicer to Come Home"	Alan Wallis	Bernard McKenna and Richard Laing	14 July 1974
