= Doctor at the Top =

British TV sitcom (BBC1, 1991)

- Starring: Robin Nedwell; George Layton; Geoffrey Davies; Ernest Clark
- Country of origin: United Kingdom
- Original language: English
- No. of series: 1
- No. of episodes: 7

Production
- Running time: 30 minutes

Original release
- Network: BBC1
- Release: 21 February – 4 April 1991

Related
- Doctor Down Under

Doctor at the Top is a British television comedy series, the last of seven series in a franchise that began with Doctor in the House and was inspired by the "Doctor" books by Richard Gordon. It was produced by the BBC and broadcast on BBC1 in 1991. Four of the seven episodes were written by George Layton, who is also credited as series creator and who reprised his Paul Collier character for the series; the other three episodes were written by Bill Oddie.

The series is set 25 years after the medical students from Doctor in the House graduated from St. Swithin's hospital, and follows the later careers of three of those characters. Duncan Waring (Robin Nedwell) is now married with five daughters, and remains a staff doctor with a modest income. Paul Collier (George Layton) is thrice divorced and is earning well through private patients and television appearances; he dresses expensively and drives a posh car. The most surprising transformation is Dick Stuart-Clark (Geoffrey Davies). The former ne'er-do-well has married into a wealthy, well-connected family, and as a result now holds the coveted head of surgery job at St. Swithin's, the position formerly held by the retired Professor Sir Geoffrey Loftus (Ernest Clark), who also appears in four of the episodes.

The series was not as well received as its predecessors and was cancelled after one seven episode series. According to Layton, it "depressed the whole nation" with its depiction of the formerly fun-loving characters experiencing late middle-aged angst. Oddie dubbed it "Doctor Down The Drain".

== Cast ==
- Robin Nedwell - Mr Duncan Waring
- George Layton - Mr Paul Collier
- Geoffrey Davies - Professor Dick Stuart-Clark
- Ernest Clark - Sir Geoffrey Loftus
- Roger Sloman - Dr Lionel Snell
- Georgina Melville - Geraldine Waring
- Chloë Annett - Rebecca Stuart-Clark
- Jill Benedict - Emma Stuart-Clark
- Andrew Powell - Crabtree
- Ben Onwukwe - Jonathan Asante
- Laura Bickford - Pushpinda
- Maria Collett - Margaret
- Paul Courtenay Hyu - Lee
- John Clegg - Dinner Guest
- Linda James - Angela
- Angus Deayton - Adrian Quint
- Jayne Irving - TV Presenter

== Episodes ==
No.	Title	Directed by	Written by	Original release date
1	"Sins of the Father"	Susan Belbin	George Layton	21 February 1991
2	"Happy Birthday, Sir Geoffrey"	Susan Belbin	George Layton	28 February 1991
3	"The V.I.P."	Susan Belbin	George Layton	7 March 1991
4	"The Kindest Cut..."	Susan Belbin	Bill Oddie	14 March 1991
5	"Bye Bye, Bickerstaff"	Sue Longstaff	George Layton	21 March 1991
6	"It's All Right, I'm a Doctor"	Sue Longstaff	Bill Oddie	28 March 1991
7	"Waring Goes Private?"	Sue Longstaff	Bill Oddie	4 April 1991
