= Jonathan Lynn =

British director, writer, and actor (born 1943)

- Born: Jonathan Adam Lynn; 3 April 1943 (age 83); Bath, Somerset, England
- Education: Pembroke College, Cambridge
- Occupations: Film director; writer; actor
- Years active: 1964–present
- Notable work: Clue; Nuns on the Run; My Cousin Vinny; The Whole Nine Yards; Yes Minister; Yes, Prime Minister
- Spouse: Rita Markelis (since 1967)
- Relatives: Abba Eban (uncle); Oliver Sacks (second cousin)

Jonathan Adam Lynn (born 3 April 1943) is a British-American film director, screenwriter and actor. He directed the comedy films Clue, Nuns on the Run, My Cousin Vinny and The Whole Nine Yards. He also co-created and co-wrote the political-satirical television series Yes Minister.

== Early life ==
Lynn was born in Bath, Somerset, to Jewish parents. He was the son of Robin Lynn, a Scottish physician and Ruth Helen (née Eban), an English sculptor.

His father Robin was from Glasgow, whose own father had come by boat from Lithuania. His mother Ruth's first cousin on her own mother's side was the neurologist Oliver Sacks; another cousin, Caroline Sacks, married Nicholas Samuel, 5th Viscount Bearsted. Lynn's maternal uncle was Israeli statesman Abba Eban, who, like Jonathan, studied at Cambridge, in the 1930s, and his grandmother was a secretary to Chaim Weizmann, first president of Israel.

Lynn described his family as "Jewish but secular". He was teased at school for his Jewishness, but in a later interview shrugged it off, as he believed "They just didn’t know any better". As a teenager, Lynn played drums in jazz bands.

Lynn was educated at Kingswood School, Bath, between 1954 and 1961. After he was accepted at age seventeen, he studied law at Pembroke College, Cambridge. He chose a degree in law despite his love for performing arts, as he said that studying law would "ensure his parents could still sleep at night knowing that their child had a legitimate career to fall back on, just in case".

== Career ==
=== 1960s ===
While studying at his first year in Cambridge, he met Eric Idle. Idle asked Lynn to join the Cambridge University Footlights Club. In 1965, he was in the Footlights revue Cambridge Circus. With Bill Oddie, Tim Brooke-Taylor and David Hatch, he appeared on Broadway and on The Ed Sullivan Show. Lynn then took acting lessons from actress Mira Rostova.

Lynn's first West End appearance was in a stage production of Green Julia, for which he was nominated for the 1965 Plays and Players Award as Most Promising New Actor. In 1967, he played Motel the tailor in the original West End production of Fiddler on the Roof (production recorded by CBS Records). In 1968, he was in the film Prudence and the Pill. From the late 1960s, Lynn was appearing in and writing television sitcoms, including the television comedy series Twice a Fortnight with Graeme Garden, Bill Oddie, Terry Jones, Michael Palin and Tony Buffery.

=== 1970s ===
Lynn played the Irish medical student Danny Hooley in the second series of the television comedy Doctor in the House in 1970, replacing Martin Shaw, who played Welsh man Huw Evans. He wrote some episodes for future series in the Doctor in the House franchises including Doctor at Large, Doctor in Charge, Doctor at Sea and Doctor on the Go. He also wrote episodes of On the Buses and wrote for Harry Worth and George Layton. In the 1970s, his most memorable roles included Beryl's boyfriend Robert in early series of The Liver Birds; Harold in Jack Rosenthal's 1976 television film Bar Mitzvah Boy,; and Ted Margolis in Rosenthal's The Knowledge (1979).

His film appearances included roles in The House That Dripped Blood (1971), and Romance with a Double Bass (1974) He had a bit-part as a window cleaner in the BBC television series The Good Life. Lynn's first (co-written) screenplay was for The Internecine Project, which was released in 1974.

=== 1980s and 1990s ===
After forming a partnership with Antony Jay, they would begin working with one another, eventually writing Yes Minister, which aired from 1980 to 1988. His directoral debut came in 1985, with Clue.

On 20 October 1984, he was the subject of an episode of the radio series Desert Island Discs, in which he picked a collection of Jeeves & Wooster novels by P G Wodehouse as his book of choice, a pen and paper as his luxury items, and songs written and/or composed by Wolfgang Amadeus Mozart, Ludwig van Beethoven, Jimmy Durante and Paul Simon.

Lynn co-authored the books The Complete Yes Minister, as well as The Complete Yes Prime Minister, which spent 106 weeks on the Sunday Times top 10 fiction list. Both were ranked number one on the Sunday Times list, including in December 1986 when the books were ranked number one and number two respectively. He also wrote the 1993 novel Mayday.

In the 1990s, Lynn directed some of his most well-known films, including Nuns on the Run (1990), My Cousin Vinny (1992), The Distinguished Gentleman (1992), Greedy (1994), Sgt. Bilko (1996), and Trial and Error (1997). Lynn also served as a producer for Trial and Error, which received an exclusive production agreement with Columbia Pictures Television in 1992. Lynn's last acting credit came in 1994 when he appeared as a butler in Greedy.

=== 2000s to present ===
He was executive producer of Vanity Fair in 2004, and He's Such a Girl in 2008.

Lynn won praise for his direction of the 2010 London stage version of Yes, Prime Minister, which he co-wrote as well.

In 2011 Lynn wrote a non-fiction work entitled Comedy Rules. The Independent called the book "a charming memoir, full of amusing and insightful anecdotes about the many entertainers Lynn has worked with" and described it as a combination of autobiography and how-to manual for comedy. The paper wrote further: "By dovetailing different types of book, Lynn cleverly avoids the pitfalls of both genres. Because it's ostensibly a sort of how-to book, there are no boring childhood reminiscences. Because it's also a kind of autobiography, his no-nonsense dos and don'ts are springboards for entertaining yarns, rather than academic discourse."

Lynn co-wrote, co-produced, and co-directed the Yes, Minister revival series Yes, Prime Minister series produced by the BBC on Gold in 2013.

In 2016 Lynn's play The Patriotic Traitor was published. Its subject is the relationship of Philippe Pétain to Charles de Gaulle. In the words of the blurb, ‘Two giants of the twentieth century who loved each other like father and son until they found themselves on opposing sides in World War II. In 1945 de Gaulle had his oldest friend tried for treason. Their complex relationship – noble, comic and absurd – changed history.’

Lynn also co-wrote the stage play of "Clue", together with Hunter Foster, Eric Price and Sandy Rustin.

== Personal life ==
Lynn has been married to his wife, Canadian-born actress Rita Markelis, since 1 August 1967.

Lynn has lived in the United States for many years, primarily living in New York, and has acquired U.S. citizenship. In 2020, he and his wife put up their condo apartment on 54th Street in Manhattan for sale for $2.89 million.

He is a guest instructor at New York's HB Studio.

In 2018, Lynn criticized statements made by Jeremy Corbyn after Corbyn had attended a speech given in Parliament by Palestinian academic Manuel Hassassian. Corbyn claimed that after speaking, Hassassian was berated by certain Zionists in the audience, who Corbyn said had failed to understand the "English irony" employed in Hassassian's rhetoric. Lynn, in a letter to The Times, wrote "I am Jewish. Although I wrote Yes Minister and Yes, Prime Minister, Corbyn says I don’t understand English irony. My co-writer Tony Jay was only half-Jewish, so perhaps he half-understood irony and was able to supply some".

== Awards ==
Lynn's work on the Minister series earned him three BAFTAs, two Broadcasting Press Guild Awards, and two Pye Television Writers Awards, and he won the ACE Award for Best Written Comedy Series. The Campaign for Freedom of Information also recognized Lynn with a special award for his work on the show. Lynn was a recipient of a Diamond Jubilee Award for Political Satire in 2010. He received an NAACP Image Award for the 2003 film The Fighting Temptations.

== Filmography ==
=== Film ===
Year	Title	Director	Writer	Producer	Executive producer
1974	The Internecine Project		Yes		
1985	Clue	Yes	Yes		
1990	Nuns on the Run	Yes	Yes		
1992	My Cousin Vinny	Yes			
1992	The Distinguished Gentleman	Yes			
1994	Greedy	Yes			
1996	Sgt. Bilko	Yes			
1997	Trial and Error	Yes		Yes	
2000	The Whole Nine Yards	Yes			
2003	The Fighting Temptations	Yes			
2004	Vanity Fair				Yes
2008	He's Such a Girl				Yes
2010	Wild Target	Yes			

=== Television ===
Year	Title	Director	Writer	Producer	Notes
1971	Doctor at Large		Yes		Episode: "Pull the Other One!"
1972–73	On the Buses		Yes		6 episodes
1972–73	Doctor in Charge		Yes		11 episodes
1972	Nearest and Dearest		Yes		Episode: "Worker's Playtime"
1973	Romany Jones		Yes		Episode: "Look After the Pennies"
1973	All Star Comedy Carnival		Yes		Doctor in Charge
1974	My Name is Harry Worth		Yes		3 episodes
1974	Doctor at Sea		Yes		5 episodes
1975	Doctor on the Go		Yes		5 episodes
1975–76	My Brother's Keeper		Yes		13 episodes
1980–84	Yes Minister		Yes		22 episodes
1982	The Funny Side of Christmas		Yes		Yes Minister
1983	Arms and the Man	Yes			TV film
1985	Twee handen op een buik		Yes		TV film
1986–88	Yes, Prime Minister		Yes		16 episodes
1987	Mr. President		Yes		Episode: "Freedom of Speech"
1988	American Playhouse		Yes		Episode: "Suspicion"
1988	Smart Guys	Yes			Unsold pilot
1990	Ferris Bueller	Yes			Episode: "Pilot"
1990	Life After Life		Yes		TV film
2013	Yes, Prime Minister	Yes	Yes	Yes	6 episodes

=== Acting roles (film) ===
Year	Title	Role	Notes
1968	Prudence and the Pill	Chemist's Assistant	
1971	The House That Dripped Blood	Mr. Petheridge (uncredited)	Segment "The Cloak"
1975	Romance with a Double Bass	Leader of the Orchestra	Short film
1975	Who Sold You This, Then?		Video short
1976	The Cold Call		Video short
1977	The Fortune Teller		Short film
1980	Breaking Glass	Radio DJ	
1985	Into the Night	Tailor	
1990	3 Men and a Little Lady	Vicar Hewitt	
1994	Greedy	Douglas	
1999	One Man Band	Tailor's Assistant	Short film
2009	He's Such a Girl	Priest	
2010	Wild Target	Parrot (voice)	

=== Acting roles (television) ===
Year	Title	Role	Notes
1966	Thirteen Against Fate	Moise	Episode: "The Lodger"
1967	Twice a Fortnight	Various	11 episodes
1968	The Jazz Age	Harry Plant	Episode: "Black Exchange"
1969	Hadleigh	Harold	Episode: "The Ring"
1969	Softly, Softly	Tony	Episode: "Wild Goose"
1969	The Merchant of Venice	Tubal	TV short
1970	ITV Playhouse	John Simons	Episode: "Rumour"
1970	Doctor in the House	Danny Hooley	9 episodes
1972	The Liver Birds	Johnny	Episode: "The Driving Test"
1972	ITV Sunday Night Drama	Bill	Episode: "Don't Deed the Fish"
1972	Colditz	Bergman	Episode: "The Spirit of Freedom"
1972	Turnbull's Finest Half Hour	Roddy Cheever-Jones	5 episodes
1973	Doctor in Charge	Danny Hooley	Episode: "Should Auld Acquaintance; Be Forgot?"
1974	The Liver Birds	Robert	7 episodes
1974	Whodunnit?	Bob Deacon	Episode: "It's Quicker by Train"
1974–75	The Dick Emery Show	Various	4 episodes
1975	The Good Life	Window Cleaner	Episode: "Pig's Lib"
1975–76	My Brother's Keeper	Pete Booth	13 episodes
1976	Play for Today	Harold	Episode: "Bar Mitzvah Boy"
1976	Pleasure at Her Majesty's	Various	TV film
1978	BBC2 Play of the Week	Gaston	TV film: "She Fell Among Thieves"
1978	Play for Today	Cyril Benson	Episode: "Dinner at the Sporting Club"
1979	The Knowledge	Ted Margolies	TV film
1982	Outside Edge	Kevin	TV film
1984	Diana	Twining	Miniseries, 3 episodes
1988	American Playhouse	Beaky Thwaite	Episode: "Suspicion"

=== Additional credits ===
Year	Title	Role	Notes
1975	Decisions, Decisions	Writer	Video short
1976	The Cold Call	Writer	Video short
1977	How Am I Doing?	Writer	Video short
1977	The Unorganized Manager, Part One: Damnation	Writer	Video short
1977	The Unorganized Manager, Part Two: Salvation	Writer	Video short
1977	The Fortune Teller	Writer	Short film
1979	I'd Like a Word with You	Writer	Video short
2003	Beyoncé Feat. Walter Williams Sr.: He Still Loves Me	Director	Music video

== See also ==
- Cambridge Arts Theatre
