= The Vault of Horror (film) =

1973 British film by Roy Ward Baker

- Theatrical release poster
- Directed by: Roy Ward Baker
- Written by: Milton Subotsky
- Based on: The Vault of Horror by EC Comics
- Produced by: Milton Subotsky; Max Rosenberg
- Starring: Dawn Addams; Tom Baker; Michael Craig; Denholm Elliott; Glynis Johns; Edward Judd; Curt Jurgens; Anna Massey; Daniel Massey; Terry-Thomas
- Cinematography: Denys N. Coop
- Edited by: Oswald Hafenrichter
- Music by: Douglas Gamley
- Production companies: Amicus Productions; Metromedia Producers Corporation
- Distributed by: Fox-Rank; Cinerama Releasing Corporation
- Release date: 16 March 1973
- Running time: 87 minutes
- Country: United Kingdom
- Language: English

The Vault of Horror (also known as Vault of Horror, Further Tales from the Crypt and Tales from the Crypt II) is a 1973 British anthology horror film directed by Roy Ward Baker, and starring Terry-Thomas, Dawn Addams, Denholm Elliott, Curt Jurgens, Tom Baker, Michael Craig, Terence Alexander, Glynis Johns, Mike Pratt, Robin Nedwell, Geoffrey Davies, Daniel Massey and Anna Massey. None of the film's stories are actually from Vault of Horror comics. All but one appeared in Tales from the Crypt, the exception being from Shock SuspenStories. The Vault Keeper character from the comics is omitted from the film.

== Plot ==
Intro

Five strangers board a descending lift, one by one, in a modern office block in London. They reach the sub-basement, though none of them have pressed for that destination. There they find a large, elaborately furnished room that appears to be a gentlemen's club. The lift door has closed; there are no buttons to bring it back, nor any other exit. Resigned to waiting for help, the five men settle down with drinks and talk. The conversation turns to dreams, and each man tells of a recurring nightmare.

"Midnight Mess" (Tales from the Crypt #35)

Harold Rogers kills Clive, a private detective he hired to track his sister Donna to a strange town, and then kills her to claim the family inheritance. After settling down to a post-murder meal at the local restaurant, he discovers the town is home to a nest of vampires: Donna is not as dead as he thinks, and he becomes the dish of the night when his jugular vein is tapped out as a beverage dispenser (this last scene is blacked-out in the U.S. DVD release).

"The Neat Job" (Shock SuspenStories #1)

The obsessively neat Arthur Critchit marries Eleanor, a wife who proves to be not quite the housekeeper he hoped for. His constant nagging about the mess she makes eventually drives her mad. Upon his shouting at her, "Can't you do anything neatly? Can't you?", she finally snaps and kills him with a hammer blow to the exact centre of his cranium. She then cuts up the corpse and puts all the different organs into neatly labelled jars.

"This Trick'll Kill You" (Tales from the Crypt #33)

Sebastian is a magician on a working holiday in India, where he and his wife Inez are searching for new tricks. Nothing impresses until he sees a girl charming a rope out of a basket with a flute. Unable to work out how the trick is done, he persuades her to come to his hotel room, where he and his wife murder her and steal the enchanted rope. Sebastian plays the flute, and the rope rises; realizing that they have discovered a piece of genuine magic, the couple begin plans to work it into their act. Inez experiments with climbing the rope, only to disappear with a scream. An ominous patch of blood appears on the ceiling, and the rope coils round Sebastian's neck and hangs him. Their victim reappears alive in the bazaar.

"Bargain in Death" (Tales from the Crypt #28)

Maitland is buried alive as part of an insurance scam concocted with his friend Alex. Alex double-crosses Maitland, leaving him to suffocate. Two trainee doctors, Tom and Jerry, bribe a gravedigger to dig up a corpse to help with their studies. When Maitland's coffin is opened, he jumps up gasping for air, scaring Tom and Jerry who run out into the middle of the road in front of Alex's car, which crashes into a tree and explodes. The gravedigger kills Maitland, and when trying to close the sale of the corpse apologizes to Tom and Jerry for the damage to the head.

"Drawn and Quartered" (Tales from the Crypt #26)

Moore is an impoverished painter living in Haiti. When he learns that his paintings have been sold for high prices by art dealers Diltant and Gaskill after being praised by critic Fenton Breedley, all of whom told him that they were worthless, he goes to a voodoo priest and his painting hand is given voodoo power; whatever he paints or draws can be harmed by damaging its image. Rather awkwardly, these events coincide with his completing a self-portrait, which he keeps under lock and key to prevent the magic from turning on him. Returning to London, Moore paints portraits of the three men who cheated him, and mutilates the paintings to exact his revenge. He gets revenge on the final victim Diltant by painting a red dot on the painting that leads to the gun-wielding man shooting himself in the forehead. He next runs back home, because leaving his painting in an airless strongbox would nearly suffocate him. He puts his own portrait out in the open before realizing he left his watch at the scene of the death. While running back, a workman accidentally drops a can of paint thinner on the picture through a skylight, and Moore, as a result of the voodoo, suffers a correspondingly messy death when trying to cross the road as a truck crosses his path.

Finale

When the story of the final dream is told, the five ponder the meaning of their nightmares. The lift door opens, and they find themselves looking out onto a graveyard. Rogers, Critchit, Maitland, and Moore walk out into the graveyard and disappear one by one. Sebastian remains behind and explains that they are all damned Souls compelled to tell the stories of their evil deeds for all eternity. He then turns back into the room, which is now a mausoleum, walks towards the casket and disappears himself. Then the door slams shut.

== Cast ==
- Daniel Massey as Harold Rogers
- Terry-Thomas as Arthur Critchit
- Curt Jurgens as Sebastian
- Michael Craig as Maitland
- Tom Baker as Moore
- Anna Massey as Donna Rogers
- Glynis Johns as Eleanor Critchit
- Dawn Addams as Inez
- Edward Judd as Alex
- Denholm Elliott as Diltant
- Robin Nedwell as Tom
- Geoffrey Davies as Jerry
- Terence Alexander as Fenton Breedley
- John Witty as Arthur Gaskill
- Jasmina Hilton as Indian girl
- Tony Hazel as Voodoo man
- Ishaq Bux as fakir
- John Forbes-Robertson as Wilson
- Maurice Kaufmann as Bob Dickson
- Arthur Mullard as gravedigger
- Mike Pratt as Clive
- Marianne Stone as Jane
- Erik Chitty as old waiter
- Tommy Godfrey as landlord
- Jerold Wells as waiter
- Tony Wall as painter

== Production ==
The film was shot on location and at Twickenham Studios. The tower featured in the opening scenes is the Millbank Tower in London.

In "Bargain in Death", Maitland (Michael Craig) can be seen reading a copy of the novelisation of the earlier Amicus film Tales from the Crypt (1972). The same installment features Geoffrey Davies and Robin Nedwell, who both appeared in the British TV series Doctor in the House. The Tales from the Crypt story was inspired by the Ambrose Bierce short story "One Summer Night". "Midnight Mess" features a brother and sister, Harold and Donna Rogers, as characters. They are played by real-life brother and sister Anna Massey and Daniel Massey, whose parents were actors Adrianne Allen and Raymond Massey.

== Release ==
=== Critical reception ===
Reception at the time of release was largely negative. Roger Greenspun of The New York Times was dismissive, writing that of the several distinguished actors who appeared in the film, "none is ever quite so bad as the material warrants." Variety wrote, "Quality for the material is uneven, ranging from camp comedy to the belabored grotesque ... Performances, given the limited nature of the script, are above par for this sort of exercise." Kevin Thomas of the Los Angeles Times called the film "a very tepid, static affair despite the presence of many luminaries of the English stage and screen." Tom Milne of The Monthly Film Bulletin wrote that the film was "even less satisfactory" than Tales from the Crypt, "mainly because the Freddie Francis atmospherics have been replaced by pedantically flat direction by Roy Ward Baker in which each story plods squarely through yards of exposition before erupting in all too brief explosions of Grand Guignol."

Later responses have been more positive: Halliwell's Film Guide described the film as "plainly but well staged." Jeremy Aspinall of Radio Times gave the film three stars out of five, describing it as a "suitably ghoulish companion piece to the excellent Tales from the Crypt", "fiendishly fun", with "a touch of class in the cast", concluding "if you like your fright fables darkly droll, then this should certainly do the trick." It supplies the title of a 2004 survey of the films of the era, A Vault of Horror: A Book of 80 Great British Horror Movies from 1956-1974.

=== Home media ===
A shot from the possible deleted scene

Together with Tales from the Crypt, The Vault of Horror was released on a Midnite Movies double feature DVD on 11 September 2007. The version used is the 83 minute U.S. theatrical PG re-release (the original theatrical release in the U.S. was the 87 minute R-rated version), which replaces some of the gorier scenes with still images (notably the final shot of "Midnight Mess" showing Harold's neck being tapped for blood, and Arthur Critchit (Terry-Thomas) dropping from a hammer blow in "The Neat Job") to receive an MPAA PG rating. The U.K. Vipco DVD release featured the original unedited U.K. print.

An uncensored version was first shown on the British TV channel Film4 on 25 August 2008, and later released by Scream Factory on a double-feature Blu-ray with Tales From The Crypt. Questions have been raised as to if these prints are still missing a scene in which the characters who walk to the graveyard are seen with dead, skeletal faces. It may be that this shot has been lost; no prints containing it have ever surfaced, and there is no evidence it was ever included in the final release prints, as even the original unedited prints that have surfaced do not include a scene resembling the photo. It also has been widely speculated that the image was just a photo taken for promotional purposes and was never a filmed scene, as Curt Jurgens' character Sebastian is portrayed by a different actor in the photo. Jurgens' character is the main focus of the end sequence; hence, some have stated that a scene is unlikely to have been filmed with a different actor portraying the character, for audiences would have noticed the change.
