= Barry Evans (actor) =

English actor (1943–1997)

- Evans as Jamie McGregor in Here We Go Round the Mulberry Bush (1968)
- Born: Barry Joseph Evans; 18 June 1943; Guildford, Surrey, England
- Died: 9 February 1997 (aged 53); Claybrooke Magna, Leicestershire, England
- Education: Italia Conti Academy of Theatre Arts; Royal Central School of Speech and Drama
- Occupation: Actor
- Years active: 1964–1993

Barry Joseph Evans (18 June 1943 – c. 9 February 1997) was an English actor. He was best known for his appearances in British sitcoms such as Doctor in the House and Mind Your Language.

== Early life and education ==
Barry Evans was born in Guildford, Surrey, to Ruby Evans, who was unmarried, and an unidentified father, possibly a Canadian army serviceman, who was stationed in the UK during World War Two.

He lived with his mother until the age of four, but was placed into a residential nursery, and later an orphanage, when Ruby became engaged and later married John Balch, who was not willing to become a father to another man's child. With his grandmother unable to take responsibility for raising Barry in Ruby's absence, he never saw his mother again.

Evans was educated at the primary and secondary orphanage boarding schools run by the Shaftesbury Homes, first at Fortescue House School in Twickenham, and then at Bisley Boys' School in Bisley, Surrey. His acting ability was recognised at an early age and he often played the leading roles in school plays. He briefly lived in Yalding in Kent before moving to London. Evans won a John Gielgud Scholarship to study at the Central School of Speech and Drama.

== Career ==
Evans had three minor roles in National Theatre productions at the Old Vic in the 1960s: a Peruvian Indian in Peter Shaffer's The Royal Hunt of the Sun, three small roles in Alexander Ostrovsky's The Storm, and a coffee boy in Shakespeare's Much Ado About Nothing. One of his first film credits was the lead role in Clive Donner's film Here We Go Round the Mulberry Bush (1968) where he was cast as Jamie McGregor, a teenager who finds it difficult to lose his virginity. Photoplay magazine called Evans a "bright and exciting new actor", and The Sunday Telegraph described his screen debut as "brilliant".

Here We Go Round the Mulberry Bush represented a breakthrough in a number of technical features: the script, the photography and the filming techniques. Jamie McGregor speaks his thoughts. The soundtrack mainly contained songs performed by The Spencer Davis Group and Traffic. The film was listed to compete at the 1968 Cannes Film Festival, but the Festival was cancelled that year. The film saw the beginning of a long friendship between Barry Evans and the director, Clive Donner, whom Evans regarded as one of his best friends. He worked with Donner again in 1969 in the historical epic Alfred the Great.

In 1969, Evans appeared alongside Roddy McDowall in an episode of the series Journey to the Unknown entitled "The Killing Bottle", as the innocent accomplice of a man planning to murder his brother for an inheritance, but who survives both brothers.

His first significant television role was in the sitcom Doctor in the House (1969–1970), based on Richard Gordon's novels, which had already been turned into a feature film series. Evans starred as the young student doctor Michael Upton, to whom Evans felt he bore no similarities. Following the show's success he starred in the sequel to the series, Doctor at Large (1971). Evans enjoyed working with his fellow actors George Layton, Geoffrey Davies, Robin Nedwell and Richard O'Sullivan, and he later described these as the best years of his life. Work on the "Doctor" series was extremely intense and left him no time to take on other roles; he therefore declined to appear in the later sequels. In a 1977 interview he stated that he had been "incredibly stupid" to turn the series down.

In 1971, Evans played the character of Eli Frome in Pete Walker's low-budget thriller Die Screaming, Marianne, alongside Susan George. In 1976, he had the lead role in Stanley Long's sex comedy Adventures of a Taxi Driver. Unlike in Here We Go Round the Mulberry Bush, in which the viewer partakes of Jamie's thoughts, Evans's character breaks the fourth wall throughout the film. Although the film was successful, Evans decided not to appear in the sequels but he starred in the similarly themed Under the Doctor the same year.

Evans also did some theatre work, but this did not prove financially worthwhile, and he spent several spells claiming benefits. He wrote to London Weekend Television, "and told them ... I was still alive". This led to what became his best-known comedy role, as Jeremy Brown in the ITV sitcom Mind Your Language (1977–1979, 1986), which was a humorous look at an evening class tutor teaching English to foreign students. The series was written by TV scriptwriter Vince Powell and was adapted for American TV as What a Country! in 1986. In the same year it was briefly revived in Britain for a further 13 episodes.

== Later career ==
In 1982–1983, Evans played Dick Emery's trusted assistant Robin Bright in the comedy thriller series Legacy of Murder.

By the latter half of the 1980s, Evans's youthful appearance was working against him and he found it difficult to obtain mature acting roles in keeping with his age. His last role was as Bazzard in the 1993 film adaptation of The Mystery of Edwin Drood. By the mid-1990s, Evans was working as a minicab driver in Leicestershire.

== Personal life and death ==
Evans was bisexual. He had brief relationships with the actress Judy Geeson and actor Jimmy Gardner, and remained on good terms with them after their separations.

He met Jain Galliford in Portugal in 1969, and they were in a serious relationship for a while. In 1993, Evans moved to Hinckley, Leicestershire, to help Galliford raise her four children after her partner, Roger Severs, was arrested for murdering his parents. Galliford was his closest friend.

Evans told Galliford that he had a huge crush on actor Lionel Blair, which Blair did not reciprocate.

On 10 February 1997, police discovered Evans's body in his living room after going to the house to tell him they had recovered his stolen car, which had been reported missing the day before. The cause of his death has never been confirmed. The coroner found a blow to Evans's head, and high levels of alcohol in his system. A short will was found on a table next to his body and a spilt packet of aspirin tablets was found on the floor, bearing a pre-decimalisation price tag (i.e., before 15 February 1971), indicating the pack was at least 26 years old, but the coroner concluded he had not taken any. An open verdict was eventually given. An 18-year-old youth was arrested but later released without charge due to insufficient evidence. Evans was cremated at Golders Green Crematorium.

== Legacy ==
A blue plaque commemorating Evans, erected by The Heritage Foundation, is situated at 8 Buckland Crescent in Belsize Park, north west London. He lived at this address from 1960 until the early 1980s. A memorial charity lunch in aid of Barnardo's was held in honour of Evans and Mind Your Language writer Vince Powell at the Marriott Hotel near Marble Arch in central London. His premature death and later career featured in a TV documentary, Saucy! Secrets of the British Sex Comedy, broadcast by Channel 4 in July 2024. Radio Times previewed "the sad tale of Barry Evans, who hid his true sexuality at a time when he was receiving on-screen advances from women in Adventures of a Taxi Driver."

A biography by Daniel Ward, Barry Evans: The Life and Death of a Sitcom Star, was published in 2025.

== TV credits ==
| Year | Title | Role | Notes |
|---|---|---|---|
| 1964 | Camera Three "Chips with Everything" | First Airman | |
| 1964 | Redcap "The Boys of B Company" | Tug Wilson | |
| 1965 | Undermind "Flowers of Havoc" | Ted | |
| 1967 | Much Ado About Nothing | Coffee boy | BBC studio recording of Zeffirelli's National Theatre production |
| 1967 | The Baron "The Edge of Fear" | Hotel porter | Uncredited |
| 1968 | Love Story "The Proposal" | | |
| 1969 | Journey to the Unknown "The Killing Bottle" | Jimmy Rintoul | |
| 1969–1971 | Doctor in the House; Doctor at Large | Dr Michael Upton | |
| 1971 | ITV Playhouse "Like Puppies in a Basket" | Tony | |
| 1971 | Thirty-Minute Theatre "Blues in the Morning" | Tommo | |
| 1972 | Late Night Theatre "Torquil" | Joe | |
| 1975 | Crossroads | Trevor Woods | |
| 1977–1979; 1986 | Mind Your Language | Mr Jeremy Brown | |
| 1978 | Crown Court "Still Waters" | Barry Sellars | |
| 1982 | Legacy of Murder | Robin Bright | |

== Filmography ==
| Year | Title | Role | Notes |
|---|---|---|---|
| 1967 | The White Bus | Boy | |
| 1967 | Here We Go Round the Mulberry Bush | Jamie McGregor | |
| 1969 | Alfred the Great | Ingild | |
| 1971 | Journey to Murder | Jimmy Rintoul | (The Killing Bottle) |
| 1971 | Die Screaming, Marianne | Eli Frome | |
| 1976 | Adventures of a Taxi Driver | Joe North | |
| 1976 | Under the Doctor | Doctor Boyd, Psychiatrist/ Mr Johnson / Lt Cranshaw / Colin Foster | |
| 1993 | The Mystery of Edwin Drood | Bazzard | (final film role) |

== See also ==
- List of unsolved deaths
