= Executive Stress =

- Genre: Sitcom
- Created by: George Layton
- Directed by: David Askey (series 3); John Howard Davies (series 1–2)
- Starring: Penelope Keith; Geoffrey Palmer; Peter Bowles; Harry Ditson; Elizabeth Counsell; Mark Caven
- Theme music composer: Andrew Lloyd Webber
- Opening theme: "Why We Fell in Love"
- Country of origin: United Kingdom
- Original language: English
- No. of series: 3
- No. of episodes: 19

Production
- Producers: James Gilbert; John Howard Davies
- Running time: 30 minutes
- Production company: Thames Television

Original release
- Network: ITV
- Release: 20 October 1986 – 27 December 1988

Executive Stress is a British sitcom that aired on ITV from 1986 to 1988. Produced by Thames Television, it first aired on 20 October 1986. After three series, the last episode aired on 27 December 1988.

Written by George Layton, Executive Stress stars Penelope Keith as Caroline Fairchild, a middle-aged woman who decides to go back to work. Her husband, Donald, is played by Geoffrey Palmer in the first series. Palmer was unable to return for the second series, so Peter Bowles played Donald in the remaining two series. Keith and Bowles had previously appeared together in the BBC comedy series To the Manor Born.

== Production ==
The programme was set in the world of publishing as it was one of the few industries of the era dominated by women, meaning Donald and Caroline could realistically be on an equal footing at work. Producer John Howard Davies commissioned a second series before the first series had even aired.

The opening theme, "Why We Fell in Love", was performed by Julie Covington. The lyrics were written by Tim Rice with the music composed by Andrew Lloyd Webber.

In September 2026, writer George Layton, stage manager Marilyn Edwards and senior cameraman Chas Watts were interviewed about their work on the series by TV historian Oliver Crocker for an article in Best of British Magazine, which also paid tribute to Penelope Keith.

== Cast ==
- Penelope Keith as Caroline Fairchild (née Fielding)
- Geoffrey Palmer as Donald Fairchild (series 1)
- Peter Bowles as Donald Fairchild (series 2 and 3)
- Harry Ditson as Edgar Frankland Jr
- Elizabeth Counsell as Anthea Duxbury
- Mark Caven as Anthony
- Hilary Gish as Nicky
- Wanda Ventham as Sylvia (series 1 and 2)
- Donald Pickering as Gordon (series 1 and 2)
- Richard Marner as Herman Ginsberg (series 1)
- Timothy Carlton as Peter Stuart (series 1)
- Elspeth March as Patricia Fairchild, Donald Fairchild’s mother (series 2)
- David Neville as Peter Stuart (series 2)
- Lorraine Doyle as Jackie (series 1 and 2)
- Ben Robertson as Stephen Cass (series 1 and 2)
- Vincent Brimble as Tim Jackson (series 3)
- Geoffrey Whitehead as Peter Davenport (series 3)

== Plot ==
After 26 years of marriage, mother-of-five Caroline Fairchild decides to go back to work. Her husband Donald would like her to work part-time in their home town of Amersham in Buckinghamshire. Instead she gets a job in London as an Editorial Director for a company called Oasis Publishing. At the company she is reunited with her former secretary, Anthea Duxbury, who is a sales export director.

Oasis Publishing is owned by the American Frankland Corporation, which is run by Edgar Frankland, Jr., the son of the corporation's boss. On Caroline's first day at work, The Frankland Corporation takes over Ginsberg Publishing, the company that Donald works for. Donald is moved to Oasis, and Caroline and he find themselves working together. However, an unwritten rule at Frankland states that married couples cannot work together, so they have to pretend not to know each other, so Caroline uses her maiden name of Fielding. In Series Two, Edgar finds out they are married, but does not sack them and makes them joint managing directors of Oasis.

== Episodes ==
Three series of Executive Stress were broadcast from 1986 to 1988. The first series, made of seven episodes, aired on Mondays at 20:00 following Coronation Street, as did the six-episode second series. The third series, also of six episodes, aired on Tuesdays at 20.30 following The Bill.

=== Series overview ===
Series	Episodes	Originally released	
Series	Episodes	First released	Last released
1	7	20 October 1986	1 December 1986
2	6	21 September 1987	26 October 1987
3	6	22 November 1988	27 December 1988

=== Series 1: 1986 ===
No.	Title	Original release date
1	"Episode One"	20 October 1986
2	"Episode Two"	27 October 1986
3	"Episode Three"	3 November 1986
4	"Episode Four"	10 November 1986
5	"Episode Five"	17 November 1986
6	"Episode Six"	24 November 1986
7	"Episode Seven"	1 December 1986

=== Series 2: 1987 ===
No.	Title	Original release date
1	"Episode One"	21 September 1987
2	"Episode Two"	28 September 1987
3	"Episode Three"	5 October 1987
4	"Episode Four"	12 October 1987
5	"Episode Five"	19 October 1987
6	"Episode Six"	26 October 1987

=== Series 3: 1988 ===
No.	Title	Original release date
1	"Episode One"	22 November 1988
2	"Episode Two"	29 November 1988
3	"Episode Three"	6 December 1988
4	"Episode Four"	13 December 1988
5	"Episode Five"	20 December 1988
6	"Episode Six"	27 December 1988

== Broadcast around the world ==
In the United States, many PBS member stations aired at least the first series in the 1980s and 1990s.

The series was broadcast in Australia around the time it was made with reruns of the series also airing in 2009 on ABC Television.

== DVD release ==
The complete first and second series were released on 26 April 2010 and 24 January 2011, by Network, The third (and final) series was finally released on 20 May 2013, followed by a complete series set (consisting all three series) on 13 August 2018.

DVD	Release date
The Complete Series 1	26 April 2010
The Complete Series 2	24 January 2011
The Complete Series 3	20 May 2013
The Complete Series 1 to 3 Box Set	13 August 2018

== See also ==
- The Cara Williams Show, an American sitcom of 1964–1965 with a similar premise.
