= Doctor at Large (TV series) =

British TV sitcom (ITV, 1971)

- Compilation video cover
- Starring: Barry Evans; Richard O'Sullivan; Geoffrey Davies; George Layton; Ernest Clark
- Country of origin: United Kingdom
- Original language: English
- No. of series: 1
- No. of episodes: 29

Production
- Running time: 25 minutes
- Production company: London Weekend

Original release
- Network: ITV
- Release: 28 February – 12 September 1971

Related
- Doctor in the House; Doctor in Charge

Doctor at Large is a British television comedy series, the second of seven series in a franchise that began with Doctor in the House and was inspired by the "Doctor" books by Richard Gordon. It was produced by London Weekend Television in 1971.

Writers for the Doctor at Large episodes were Bill Oddie, Graeme Garden, John Cleese, Graham Chapman, Bernard McKenna, Geoff Rowley, Andy Baker, Jonathan Lynn and David Yallop, as well as George Layton (under the pseudonym of "Oliver Fry"). The episode "No Ill Feelings" written by John Cleese is now seen as a prototype for Cleese's later series Fawlty Towers.

== Plot ==
The plot revolves around newly qualified Doctor Michael Upton as he tries to make a start in his profession. He obtains a series of jobs, including working in otolaryngology and as a general practitioner, before returning to St. Swithin's Hospital (where he received his training) as a Junior Registrar. Notable events also include Upton's (and other young doctors') pursuit of women.

== Characters ==
- Barry Evans - Dr Michael Upton
- George Layton - Dr Paul Collier
- Geoffrey Davies - Dr Dick Stuart-Clark
- Richard O'Sullivan - Dr Lawrence Bingham
- Ernest Clark - Professor Geoffrey Loftus
- Arthur Lowe - Dr Maxwell
- Madeline Smith - Sue Maxwell
- Fabia Drake - Dr Whiteland
- Brian Oulton - Dr Griffin

== Episode list ==
Airdates given here are for London Weekend Television.

No.	Title	Directed by	Written by	Original release date
1	"Now, Dr Upton"	David Askey	Graham Chapman and Bernard McKenna	28 February 1971
Michael Upton, having qualified as a doctor, interviews for a house officer post at All Saints Hospital but ends up back at St Swithin's ENT outpatients, where he struggles with a nosebleed case and a patient with imaginary illnesses.
2	"You've Really Landed Me In It This Time"	David Askey	Graham Chapman and Bernard McKenna	7 March 1971
Collier joins a GP practice run by Dr Nielson, while Upton helps Collier fake an alcohol test and attempts to avoid the advances of the surgery receptionist.
3	"You Make Me Feel So Young"	David Askey	Greame Garden and Bill Oddie	14 March 1971
Upton and Collier begin work with Dr Maxwell in a tough London district. After their car wheels are stolen, Maxwell must persuade patients to accept treatment from the youthful-looking Upton.
4	"Doctor Dish"	David Askey	Greame Garden and Bill Oddie	21 March 1971
Asked to teach sex education at a girls' school, Upton soon becomes unexpectedly popular with the pupils.
5	"Modernising Major"	David Askey	Greame Garden and Bill Oddie	28 March 1971
The young doctors acquire an ECG machine in an attempt to modernise Dr Maxwell's practice, but the results are far from successful.
6	"Congratulations, It's A Toad"	David Askey	Greame Garden and Bill Oddie	4 April 1971
Collier promotes an unconventional pregnancy-testing service involving toads and tadpoles, attracting the concern of both colleagues and the GMC.
7	"Change Your Partners"	David Askey	Greame Garden and Bill Oddie	11 April 1971
Su develops feelings for Upton, but his romance with another doctor causes friction and leads Dr Maxwell to question his conduct.
8	"Trains and Notes and Veins"	Bill Turner	Bernard McKenna	18 April 1971
Travelling home between jobs, Upton gives medical advice to a woman on a train, only to discover she is already one of his father's patients.
9	"Lock, Stock and Beryl"	Bill Turner	Graham Chapman and Bernard McKenna	25 April 1971
Upton and Collier compete for hospital posts while Bingham monopolises the most interesting medical cases.
10	"Upton Sells Out"	Bill Turner	Greame Garden and Bill Oddie	2 May 1971
Upton applies for a prestigious Harley Street position but discovers the role includes several unexpected and undignified duties.
11	"Saturday Matinee"	Alan Wallis	John Cleese	9 May 1971
Left in charge of a practice, Upton contends with an assortment of unusual patients, including a government minister, a distraught young woman and three toy bears.
12	"Where There's A Will"	Bill Turner	Greame Garden and Bill Oddie	16 May 1971
Upton becomes embroiled in the suspicious death of a wealthy patient whose unpleasant relatives are eager to secure an inheritance.
13	"Students at Heart"	Bill Turner	Graeme Garden and Bill Oddie	23 May 1971
Upton and Bingham compete for a desirable surgical post, while rugby celebrations and a misadventure involving a Mini create complications.
14	"No Ill Feeling!"	Alan Wallis	John Cleese	30 May 1971
Working for hypochondriac GP Dr Griffin, Upton stays at a suburban hotel populated by eccentric guests and an overbearing landlady.
15	"Let's Start at the Beginning"	Bill Turner	Graham Chapman and Bernard McKenna	6 June 1971
Upton begins work in psychiatry and finds himself struggling with both difficult patients and an intimidating consultant psychiatrist.
16	"It's All in the Mind"	Alan Wallis	John Cleese	13 June 1971
Upton and Collier clash with a local white witch whose methods appear more popular than their own medical practice.
17	"Cynthia Darling"	Bill Turner	John Cleese	20 June 1971
An overprotective mother repeatedly summons Upton to see her daughter, much to the annoyance of the girl's father.
18	"A Little Help from My Friends"	Alan Wallis	Geoff Rowley and Andy Baker	27 June 1971
While Griffin is in hospital, Collier and Stuart-Clark try to boost the practice's fortunes as Upton searches for a locum replacement.
19	"Devon Is Lovely at This Time of Year"	Bill Turner	Geoff Rowley and Andy Baker	4 July 1971
Upton's relationship with Dr Nicky Barrington becomes increasingly complicated.
20	"Operation Loftus"	Alan Wallis	Graham Chapman and Bernard McKenna	11 July 1971
Returning as Professor of Surgery, Loftus uncovers misconduct at St Swithin's before suddenly falling ill, forcing Upton to undertake a major operation.
21	"Mother and Father Doing Well"	Bill Turner	John Cleese	18 July 1971
As fellow doctor Huw Evans prepares for fatherhood, Upton faces a range of odd patients and hospital challenges.
22	"A Joke's a Joke"	Alan Wallis	Graham Chapman and Bernard McKenna	25 July 1971
Seeking extra income, Upton and Collier become anatomy demonstrators just as hospital governors arrive for an important visit.
23	"Pull the Other One!"	Bill Turner	Oliver Fry and Jonathan Lynn	1 August 1971
Upton and Stuart-Clark compete for the attention of a new intake of student nurses.
24	"It's the Rich What Gets All the Pleasure"	Alan Wallis	Graham Chapman and Bernard McKenna	8 August 1971
Celebrations over an inheritance end with Upton, Stuart-Clark and Bingham spending a night in police cells and facing a hospital board inquiry.
25	"Things That Go Mump in the Night"	Bill Turner	Graham Chapman and Bernard McKenna	15 August 1971
Hospitalised with mumps, Upton becomes determined to escape despite the attentions of a charming nurse.
26	"Mr Moon"	Alan Wallis	John Cleese	22 August 1971
Preparing for his fellowship examinations, Upton checks into a strict health farm where both staff and guests test his patience.
27	"The Viva"	Alan Wallis	Bernard McKenna with Graham Chapman	29 August 1971
After becoming stranded in a country pub, Upton is forced to complete his fellowship via examination over the telephone.
28	"Bewigged, Bothered, Bewildered"	Bill Turner	David A. Yallop	5 September 1971
A chaotic casualty shift leads Upton into legal trouble involving a judge, a criminal patient and a courtroom battle.
29	"A Situation Full of Promise"	Alan Wallis	Oliver Fry	12 September 1971
Confusion reigns when Upton, Collier and Bingham sit on a selection panel tasked with appointing a new senior house surgeon.

== Notes ==
The first six episodes, from "Now, Dr. Upton" to "Congratulations, It's A Toad", were recorded in black and white due to the ITV 'Colour Strike'.
