= Doctor Down Under =

Australian TV sitcom (1979–80)

- Created by: Richard Gordon
- Starring: Robin Nedwell; Geoffrey Davies; Frank Wilson; John Derum; Jennifer Mellet
- Country of origin: Australia
- Original language: English
- No. of series: 1
- No. of episodes: 13

Production
- Producer: William G. Stewart
- Running time: 25 minutes

Original release
- Network: Seven Network
- Release: 12 February – 14 May 1979

Related
- Doctor on the Go; Doctor at the Top

Doctor Down Under is a 1979 13-episode Australian television comedy series. It was the sixth of seven series in an otherwise British TV franchise that began with Doctor in the House and was inspired by the "Doctor" books by Richard Gordon. The series follows directly from its predecessor Doctor on the Go, and was commissioned by the Seven Network in association with the Paul Dainty organization based on the popularity in Australia of the previous five series in the franchise.

Writers for the Doctor Down Under episodes were Bernard McKenna, Jon Watkins, and Bernie Sharp. The episodes were directed by William G. Stewart and John Eastway; all episodes were produced by Stewart.

== Plot ==
Dr Duncan Waring and Dr Dick Stuart-Clark relocate to Australia after losing their positions at St. Swithin's hospital in London. They take up positions at St. Barnabas hospital in Sydney, where they wreak havoc on the local medical staff, especially Professor Beaumont, who is Professor of Surgery, and Dr Maurice Griffin, a surgeon with whom they share their office. Some of the nurses at the hospital, however, find Drs Waring and Stuart-Clark charming, as the two English doctors continue their pursuit of women, often involving a rivalry between the two.

== Cast ==
=== Main / regular ===
- Robin Nedwell as Dr Duncan Waring
- Geoffrey Davies as Dr Dick Stuart-Clark
- Frank Wilson as Dr Beaumont
- John Derum as Dr Maurice Griffin
- Jennifer Mellet as Linda Franklin, Duncan's medical secretary
- Joan Bruce as Sister Cummings
- Ken Wayne as Professor Wilkinson, Professor of Anaesthesia

=== Guests ===
- Chantal Contouri as Dr Wainwright (1 episode)
- Deborah Kennedy as Sister Fletcher (1 episode)
- David Foster as Dr Travers
- John Bluthal as 'Chalky' White (1 episode: "I Gotta Horse")
- John Clayton as Mr Frears (1 episode)
- Ken Wayne as Professor Wilkinson (3 episodes)
- Les Foxcroft as Mr Gilhooley (1 episode)
- Lorna Lesley Nurse Pettigrew (1 episode)
- Mary Ann Severne as Sister Potts (1 episode)
- Roger Ward as Mr Phillips (1 episode)
- Sheila Kennelly as Mrs Ellis (1 episode)

== Episode list ==
No.	Title	Written by	Original release date
1	"Thanks for the Memory"	Bernard McKenna and Jon Watkins	19 February 1979
2	"If a Job's Worth Doing"	Bernard McKenna	26 February 1979
3	"A Bird in the Hand"	Jon Watkins	5 March 1979
4	"I Gotta Horse"	Bernie Sharp	12 March 1979
5	"The Hawaiian Operation"	Jon Watkins	19 March 1979
6	"The More We Are Together"	Jon Watkins	26 March 1979
7	"It's All in the Mind"	Bernie Sharp	2 April 1979
8	"If You Can't Beat Em..."	Jon Watkins	9 April 1979
9	"Alias Clark and Waring"	Jon Watkins	16 April 1979
10	"Impatients"	Bernard McKenna	23 April 1979
11	"The Sydney Surprise"	Jon Watkins	30 April 1979
12	"The Name of the Game"	Bernard McKenna	7 May 1979
13	"Identity Crisis"	Bernard McKenna	14 May 1979

== Location of St Barnabas Hospital ==
The building used as the fictional St Barnabas Hospital is Hornsby Hospital, in Hornsby, Sydney, New South Wales, Australia.

== UK broadcast ==
Doctor Down Under aired in the United Kingdom on ITV during 1980-1981.

- Granada Television was the first ITV region to broadcast the series from 5 January 1980
- Southern Television was the second to start the series from 12 February 1980.
- Anglia Television started the series from April, airing in a mid-afternoon timeslot.

Nearly all the other ITV stations picked up the series during between June and July 1980, but it was not fully networked:

- ATV and Westward aired it at 5.15pm, following children's programmes.
- Yorkshire Television aired it after News at Ten.
- Border, Grampian, Granada, HTV, STV, and Southern aired it in a peak-time slot at 7.30pm.

The last ITV region to screen the series was in London - London Weekend Television, which produced the previous series in the Doctor franchise, screened Doctor Down Under from January 1981.

== DVD release ==
All 13 episodes of Doctor Down Under have been released as a two Disc DVD set by Umbrella Entertainment in Australia (2007).
