= Dig & Dug with Daisy =

- Promotion image of the three characters.
- Genre: Animation
- Created by: Terry Ward
- Written by: Richard Everett
- Directed by: Terry Ward
- Voices of: George Layton
- Narrated by: George Layton
- Composers: Mark London; Francis Haines
- Country of origin: United Kingdom
- Original language: English
- No. of seasons: 1
- No. of episodes: 16

Production
- Executive producer: Simon Jollands
- Producer: Terry Ward
- Running time: 10 minutes
- Production company: Dorling Kindersley

Original release
- Network: Channel 4 Tiny Pop; Channel 5 (Milkshake!)

Dig & Dug with Daisy is a British stop motion animated television series that was produced in the United Kingdom during 1993 by Dorling Kindersley (publishers of the Eyewitness Books Series). There are sixteen ten minute episodes, and the characters were created and the stories written by writer Richard Everett. The series was aired by Channel 4 in 1994. It aired on children's channels like Channel 5 from 2002 to 2004 and Tiny Pop from 2009 to 2011.

The series is about two bumbling construction workers, Dig and Dug, who are given a task to accomplish over a five-minute short. Aside from using segments much like Laurel and Hardy shorts, the show also teaches children about construction. The show was narrated by George Layton. The animated series was created, produced and directed by Terry Ward M D at Flicks Films Ltd, Wardour Street, London.

In 1996, Dorling Kindersley released a children's picture book titled Dig & Dug with Daisy, Trouble with Trucks.

== Major characters ==
- Dig: Dig is Dug's fellow companion, young, tall and skinny in appearance. Despite being eager, hard working, and ready for the job, he is quite naïve, can be easily frightened, and is inexperienced. This can often lead to comical predicaments! However, little by little, Dig is starting to learn a little bit more about machinery and construction. He is presumably in his early 30s. He has a cockney accent.
- Dug: Dug is Dig's co worker. He is stumpy, a little bit older than Dig, a bit more experienced with machinery, but just as bumbling and naïve. Dug often controls, or tries to control, the assignments given to him and Dig, but his clumsiness often gets the two of them into trouble. He can even make little, fixable problems become huge and serious. He is most likely just about in his 40s. He has a Yorkshire accent.
- Daisy: Daisy is Dug's long suffering niece. She is smarter than the two construction workers put together, so this allows her and her aunt Beth to solve almost any problem that Dig and Dug cannot solve at all. Neither her mother nor father have ever appeared on the show for unknown reasons, but it is safe to assume that her Uncle Dug would be the brother of either one of Daisy's parents.
- Farmer Stubble: Farmer Stubble lives at Merryweather Farm. He appears as a main character in the first four episodes, 'The New Tractor', 'Turnips in the Lane', 'Fencing the Field' and 'Trouble at the Haybarn.' As his name suggests, he has a stubble on his chin. His first name is revealed to be Ernest and his wife's name is Mildred. Mrs. Stubble also appears in 'The New Tractor' and 'Trouble at the Haybarn', but in 'Turnips in the Lane' and 'Fencing the Field', Farmer Stubble appears without her. However, the two of them appear in 'Night Patrol' and Ernest also appears in 'The New Office'. They even appear in flashbacks from the first two episodes seen in 'The 100th Tractor' when Dug was telling the mayoress about several adventures that he and Dig had been on earlier while taking her to the tractor factory.
- Mr. Rubble: Dig and Dug's building site boss. It is unknown what accent he talks in, although his voice does have a loud booming tone. The only four episodes he appears in are 'Mrs. Sparkle's Shed', 'Cement Pudding', 'Mr. Rubble's Wall' and 'Daisy's Kite'.
- Mr. MacAdam: Mr. MacAdam is Dig and Dug's boss of the Roadworks site. He is very good with machinery and construction, but a closer look reveals that Mr. MacAdam is almost just as clumsy and bumbling as Dig and Dug himself. He talks in a Scottish accent. The only four episodes he appears in are 'Night Patrol', 'Nowhere to Park', 'The Giant Molehill' and 'Race to the Finish'.
- Mr. Packet: Mr. Packet is Dig and Dug's manager of the tractor factory and talks in a Welsh accent. He can discover voices inside the factory. He can also deal with things such as Oswald behaving badly, his new office arriving late, making him feel upset and worried, and solve Oswald's problem by 'saying he has run out of paint' on the day of 'The 100th Tractor'. The only four episodes he appears in are 'All Hooked Up', 'Oswald Misbehaves', 'The New Office' and 'The 100th Tractor'.

== Episodes ==
1. The New Tractor
2. Turnips in the Lane
3. Fencing the Field
4. Trouble at the Haybarn
5. Mrs. Sparkle's Shed
6. Cement Pudding
7. Mr. Rubble's Wall
8. Daisy's Kite
9. Night Patrol
10. The Giant Molehill
11. Nowhere to Park
12. Race to the Finish
13. All Hooked Up
14. Oswald Misbehaves
15. The New Office
16. The 100th Tractor

== Home media release ==
=== VHS ===
==== Australia ====
- Roadshow Entertainment (1995)

| VHS title | Release date | Episodes |
|---|---|---|
| Dig and Dug with Daisy - On the Farm (14509) | 13 March 1995 | The New Tractor, Turnips in the Lane, Fencing the Field and Trouble at the Haybarn |
| Dig and Dug with Daisy - At the Building Site (14510) | 13 March 1995 | Mrs. Sparkle's Shed, Cement Pudding, Mr. Rubble's Wall and Daisy's Kite |
| Dig and Dug with Daisy - On the Road (14511) | 13 March 1995 | Night Patrol, Nowhere to Park, The Giant Molehill and Race to the Finish |
| Dig and Dug with Daisy - At the Factory (14514) | 13 March 1995 | All Hooked Up, Oswald Misbehaves, The New Office and The 100th Tractor |

==== UK ====
- Reader's Digest Video
