= Chris Sandford =

British actor (born 1939)

- Born: 6 June 1939 (age 87); Croydon, England
- Occupation: Actor
- Years active: 1956–present

Christopher Duke Sandford (born 6 June 1939) is a British actor. He has appeared in more than fifty films since 1956.

He also worked in the music business for a spell in the 1960s as both a singer and radio DJ, before returning to the acting profession. In 1975, he recorded a parody version of Telly Savalas' cover of "If" with Bill Mitchell. The song peaked at number 25 on the UK singles chart.

More recently he is the author of several books on fly-fishing, The Best of British Baits: An Identification Guide to Artificial Lures from 1849–1930 (1997), A Wellie Full of Water (2008), Flytyers' Flies: The Flies That Catch Fish (2009), and Mayflies and More: A Flytyers' Guide to the Chalkstreams (2012).

== Selected filmography ==
Film
| Year | Title | Role | Notes |
|---|---|---|---|
| 1960 | A French Mistress | Poole | |
| 1967 | Half a Sixpence | Sid | |
| 1969 | Before Winter Comes | Johnny | |
| 1969 | Jutrzenka (Winter in Majorca) | Frédéric Chopin | |
| 1970 | The Kremlin Letter | Rudolph | |
| 1970 | Deep End | Chris | |
| 1970 | Cool It Carol! | David Thing | |
| 1971 | Die Screaming, Marianne | Sebastian | |
| 1971 | Up the Chastity Belt | Mutch | |
| 1972 | King, Queen, Knave | Hofmann | |
| 1974 | Vampira | Milton | |

TV
| Year | Title | Role | Notes |
|---|---|---|---|
| 1963–1964 | Coronation Street | Walter Potts | Regular, 37 episodes |
| 1969 | Dombey and Son | Mr. Toots | |
| 1971 | The Persuaders! | Onslow Sinclair | |
| 1972 | Time on My Hands (Dad's Army) | The German Pilot | |
