= George McMahon (actor) =

Irish actor (born 1985)

George McMahon (born 20 September 1985 in Dublin, Ireland) is an Irish actor.

He is known for his role as Jamie Custer in Custer's Last Stand-up, and for his role as Mondo O'Connell in Fair City. McMahon's career began at the age of 14 when he joined the Independent Theatre Workshop and the Helen Jordan Stage School. He won reality television show Celebrity Farm in 2003. He donated the €50,000 prize fund to three charities of his choice which were The Bubblegum Club; the Children's Cancer Fund of Our Lady's Hospital for Sick Children in Crumlin; and community-based voluntary organisation St. Michael's House, which cares for children and adults with learning disabilities.

== Filmography ==
- Tempvs (2022) (short)
- Fifty Dead Men Walking (2009)
- Stardust (2006 TV miniseries)
- Fair City (2002–2005, 2009, 2013–)
- Custer's Last Stand-up (2001–2002)
- When Brendan Met Trudy (2000)

== See also ==
- List of Fair City characters
