= Die Screaming, Marianne =

1971 film by Pete Walker

- Theatrical release poster
- Directed by: Pete Walker
- Written by: Murray Smith
- Produced by: Pete Walker
- Starring: Susan George; Barry Evans; Chris Sandford; Judy Huxtable; Leo Genn
- Cinematography: Norman Langley
- Edited by: Tristam Cones
- Music by: Cyril Ornadel
- Production company: Pete Walker Film Productions
- Distributed by: London Screen
- Release date: 13 August 1971
- Running time: 99 minutes
- Country: United Kingdom
- Language: English
- Budget: £60,000

Die Screaming, Marianne is a 1971 British crime thriller film produced and directed by Pete Walker and starring Susan George and Barry Evans. It was written by Murray Smith. Although Walker's films are mostly in the horror or sexploitation genres, this is a straight thriller, with mild horror undertones.

== Plot ==
A young women jumps from a window and runs through town and country to escape some men who are pursuing her.

As the story unfolds, it emerges that she is Marianne, a nightclub dancer, who is on the run from her father, a disbarred corrupt judge who lives in a villa in Portugal with Marianne's half-sister Hildegarde. On her 21st birthday, Marianne is due to receive a large inheritance from Ruth, her mother and a former lover of the judge. The money is in a Swiss bank account along with a safebox containing legal papers incriminating her father. He and Hildegarde want the account number from Marianne so that they can access the money, which Ruth stole from the judge, and dispose of the evidence.

While evading her father's henchmen, Marianne encounters Sebastian, and after they strike up a relationship, they arrive in London where she reluctantly agrees to marry him. During the ceremony, Marianne suddenly suspects Sebastian's motives and tricks the registry clerk into believing that she is really marrying Eli Frome, Sebastian's best man, whose name he puts on the marriage certificate instead of Sebastian's. Marianne then breaks up from Sebastian, and she and Eli become romantically involved. Sebastian, who is also Hildegarde's lover, travels to Portugal and informs the judge of Marianne's marriage to Eli. The judge promises Sebastian a large amount of money if he can bring Marianne to Portugal.

Eli is abducted and threatened by two men, but gets away after stabbing one of them. Sebastian returns to London, and Marianne, wanting to make peace with her father, willingly flies to Portugal with Sebastian and Eli. At the villa, a deadly game of cat-and-mouse ensues as Sebastian and Hildegarde attempt to obtain the account number out of Marianne by locking her in an overheated sauna. Discovering that they intend to harm Marianne, the judge drives away to get help, but he uses Sebastian's car on which Sebastian had sabotaged the brakes before offering it to Eli; the car plunges off a cliff, killing him.

Marianne breaks out of the sauna and runs away to evade Sebastian and Hildegarde. Outside the house, she comes across a policeman and asks for his help, and he takes her to the police station where she is asked to identify a body, and she is shocked to see it is Eli, who has been murdered by Sebastian. Then, Sebastian and Hildegarde lure Marianne to an old abandoned building, where they attack and torture her for the account number. Marianne fights them off and runs, and Sebastian, giving chase, is seriously injured when he falls through a weakened floor into a cellar. Abandoning Sebastian to die, Hildegarde returns to the villa, but when she tries to seduce Rodriguez to enlist his help against Marianne, the judge's loyal manservant strangles her. Next morning, Rodriguez serves drinks and a birthday card from Eli to a grieving Marianne as they wait for the police to arrive.

== Cast ==
- Susan George as Marianne
- Barry Evans as Eli Frome
- Chris Sandford as Sebastian
- Judy Huxtable as Hildegarde
- Leo Genn as the judge
- Kenneth Hendel as Rodriguez
- Paul Stassino as Portuguese Police Sergeant
- Alan Curtis as disco manager
- Anthony Sharp as registrar

== Production ==
Filming took place in July 1970, with shooting on location in England and Albufeira, Portugal. Judy Huxtable was joined during filming by her boyfriend Peter Cook. Peter Walker was so pleased by this he paid for Cook's expenses.

== Critical response ==
Monthly Film Bulletin said, "The title provides some clue to the makers' intentions, though in fact Die Screaming, Marianne fails either to horrify or thrill, thanks chiefly to an incoherent script and sloppy direction which misses every opportunity to introduce tension. Some contrived editing – most noticeable in the cross-cutting between Marianne trapped in the steam bath and the judge battling to control his car on a mountain road – also fails to achieve its desired effect, and even the climactic crash is flatly shot from the wrong angle. All of this throws an undue responsibility on to the actors, who all appear stiff and unhappy with their awkward lines; their set scenes are often pure melodrama, heavily reliant on meaningful glances and over-long pregnant pauses."

Andrew Dowler of the Toronto Now wrote that Die Screaming, Marianne begins well but "founders in an exposition quagmire until the not-particularly-shocking climax".

In Uneasy Dreams: The Golden Age of British Horror Films, 1956–1976, Gary A. Smith sums up the film as a "fairly cheesy affair" despite "some effective sequences".

Ian Jane of DVD Talk praises Susan George's performance and regards the film as a well-paced "decent little thriller, even if there are a few too many loose ends for its own good".

In So Deadly, So Perverse: Giallo-Style Films From Around the World, Troy Howarth praises the film's dark humour and describes some of its set pieces as "marvellous" but concludes that it "ultimately strains under the weight of its own excess" and ends up being "less than the sum of its parts". He regards the film as exposition-heavy and over-long, arguing that it "suffers from Walker's tendency toward over-stuffing his movies with incident".
