= Sabbatical =

Rest from work for specified period of months or years

A sabbatical (from the Hebrew: שַׁבָּת Šabat (i.e., Sabbath); in Latin sabbaticus; Greek: σαββατικός sabbatikos) is a rest or break from work: "an extended period of time intentionally spent on something that's not your routine job".

The concept of the sabbatical is based on the Biblical practice of shmita (sabbatical year), which is related to agriculture. According to Leviticus 25, Jews in the Land of Israel must take a year-long break from working the fields every seven years.

Starting with Harvard University in 1880, many universities and other institutional employers of scientists, physicians, and academics offer the opportunity to qualify for paid sabbatical as an employee benefit, called sabbatical leave. Early academic sabbatical policies were designed to aid their faculty in resting and recovering, but were also provided in order to facilitate "advancements in knowledge in vogue elsewhere...an intellectual and practical necessity" for both the professors and university education more broadly. Present-day academic sabbaticals typically excuse the grantee from day-to-day teaching and departmental duties, though progress on research is expected to continue or even increase while away. Academic sabbaticals come in the form of either semester-long or full-academic year terms.

A sabbatical has also come to mean a lengthy, intentional break from a career for non-academic professionals as well. There are very few norms and expectations for non-academic, or professional, sabbaticals. They can be paid or unpaid, affiliated with one's employer or self-directed, and have a variety of durations, from several weeks to over a year.

A 2022 study of working professionals on extended leave identified three types of sabbaticals:

- Working Holidays – characterized by "intense periods of work and dedicated breaks to rest and rekindle long-neglected relationships."
- Free Dives – during which participants "leaped out of work and dove straight into intense exploration."
- Quests – which found people "pushing their personal limits to discover themselves."

The popularity of sabbaticals for non-academics has increased in the 21st century: 17% of companies offered some sort of sabbatical policy to their employees in 2017, according to a survey of US companies by the Society For Human Resource Management.

Sabbaticals are also becoming more common in the medical profession, and are being used in intense subfields such as emergency medicine to reduce physician burnout.

Microretirement or miniretirement is a related neologism meaning an extended break from work similar to sabbaticals or gap years. Microretirement may be taken to combat occupational burnout. Microretirement may create gaps in employment that may impact future employment.

== See also ==
- Career break
- Gap year
- Long service leave
- Otium
- Sabbatical officer
