= Custer's Last Stand-up =

- Genre: Children's television
- Created by: Gail Renard
- Directed by: Graeme Harper, Dearbhla Walsh, and Dez McCarthy
- Countries of origin: Ireland; United Kingdom
- No. of series: 2
- No. of episodes: 26

Production
- Executive producer: Elaine Sperber
- Producers: Michael McGowan and Ferdia McAnna
- Production company: BBC/RTÉ

Custer's Last Stand-Up is a BBC/RTÉ co-production television series which won the BAFTA for best British Children's Series in 2001. Among the actors who appeared in the series were George McMahon, Ciaran Nolan, Elaine Symons, Brian James Roche, Tom Hopkins and Deirdre Monaghan.

The show ran for two series of 26 episodes each and was created by Gail Renard who wrote the majority of the episodes. The directors of the show were Graeme Harper, Dearbhla Walsh and Dez McCarthy. The show was filmed at the RTÉ studios in Donnybrook and in Bray, County Wicklow. The first series was produced by Michael McGowan and the second series was produced by Ferdia McAnna. The executive producer was Elaine Sperber, then head of CBBC drama.
