= My Brother's Keeper (British TV series) =

British TV comedy series (1975–1976)

- George Layton and Jonathan Lynn
- Genre: Sitcom
- Written by: George Layton; Jonathan Lynn
- Directed by: Bill Podmore
- Starring: George Layton; Jonathan Lynn
- Country of origin: United Kingdom
- Original language: English
- No. of series: 2
- No. of episodes: 13

Production
- Producer: Bill Podmore
- Running time: 30 minutes
- Production company: Granada Television

Original release
- Network: ITV
- Release: 7 September 1975 – 21 June 1976

My Brother's Keeper is a British comedy television series that originally aired on ITV in 1975 and 1976. George Layton and Jonathan Lynn wrote and starred in the programme about two twin brothers, one a policeman and the other anti-establishment student, with sharply contrasting worldviews.

== Main cast ==
- George Layton as Brian Booth
- Jonathan Lynn as Pete Booth
- Tenniel Evans as Sergeant Bluett
- Hilary Mason as Mrs. Booth

== Bibliography ==
- Walker, Craig. On The Buses: The Complete Story. Andrews UK Limited, 2011.
