= 1917 (1970 film) =

1970 film

- Directed by: Stephen Weeks
- Written by: Stephen Weeks
- Based on: play The Gap by Derek Barnham
- Produced by: Tony Tenser
- Starring: Timothy Bateson; David Leland; Geoffrey Davies
- Music by: David Lee
- Production company: Tigon
- Release date: 1970
- Running time: 34 minutes
- Country: United Kingdom
- Language: English
- Budget: £20,000

1917 is a 1970 British short dramatic film directed by Stephen Weeks and starring Timothy Bateson, David Leland, and Geoffrey Davies. It was written by Weeks based on the play The Gap by Derek Barnham, and produced by Tony Tenser.

== Plot ==
Two trenches, one British, one German, are located very near to each other in Northern France. There has recently been no firing by either side, and the British can often clearly see the head of a German soldier – Willi Falk – as he moves around in his trench. Frustrated that his senior officers appear to tolerate this visible enemy, young British recruit Colman rebels and shoots Falk. His action triggers a bombardment.

== Cast ==
- Timothy Bateson as Willi Falk
- Anthony Trent as Colman
- Nel Brennen as farmgirl
- Edward Caddick as Whittaker
- Geoffrey Davies as Gessel
- Christopher Hancock as Cox
- David Leland as Felix
- Jane Lewis as Willi's wife
- Richardson Morgan as Penfold
- Reg Solley as Herr Stross
- Joss Ackland as narrator
- Harriette Johns as narrator

== Production ==
The film was shot on location at a former zinc works site in the Lower Swansea Valley.

== Reception ==
In Sight and Sound, David Pirie called 1917 "a very ambitious short film about the First World War, which, although slightly theatrical, had some dazzling things in it."

The Monthly Film Bulletin wrote: "A not very original comment on the futility of war whose slightly stylised dialogue too obviously derives from the play on which the film is based. There is some flair in the photography and the editing, but a didactic piece like this essentially needs conviction, and here, unfortunately, only Timothy Bateson's Willi carries the necessary authority."
