= Career break =

Period of time out from employment

A career break is a period of time out from employment. It is commonly used for people to take time out of their career for personal or professional development.

== History ==
A career break is usually between one month and two years long. Six months to two years is the most common period of time for a career break.

It can take the form of a sabbatical, which can be paid or unpaid; unpaid sabbaticals are much more common. Sabbaticals were originally only offered to academics and clerics but are now being increasingly offered by companies.

A career break is not simply a period of unemployment. Career breakers usually do one or more of the following:

- Rest from burnout
- Travel
- Voluntary work
- Paid work abroad
- Studying or training
- Career development and business start up
- Offering palliative care
- Raising children
- Staying up-to-date with (profession related) news
- Recovering from accidents or illnesses

== Usage ==
The career break has grown in popularity over the last several years, with 75% of the British workforce currently considering a career break. Every year, around 90,000 professionals are estimated to take a career break. It is most common in the UK, where it grew out of the gap year concept. The career break is sometimes referred to as an 'adult gap year', which reflects the commitment towards developing skills and gaining experience while out of the workforce.

In the USA a career break is generally referred to as a 'sabbatical'.

== See also ==
- Gap year
- Sabbatical year
- Leave of absence
- On-ramping
- Work–life balance
