= Stand Up, Virgin Soldiers =

- Film poster by Arnaldo Putzu
- Directed by: Norman Cohen
- Written by: Leslie Thomas
- Based on: Stand Up, Virgin Soldiers by Leslie Thomas
- Produced by: Greg Smith
- Starring: Robin Askwith; Nigel Davenport; George Layton; John Le Mesurier; Warren Mitchell; Robin Nedwell; Edward Woodward; Irene Handl; Lynda Bellingham; Fiesta Mei Ling; Pamela Stephenson
- Cinematography: Ken Hodges
- Edited by: Geoffrey Foot
- Music by: Ed Welch
- Production company: Maidenhead Film Productions
- Distributed by: Warner Bros. Pictures
- Release date: April 5, 1977
- Running time: 87 minutes
- Country: United Kingdom
- Language: English

Stand Up, Virgin Soldiers is a 1977 British film directed by Norman Cohen and starring Robin Askwith and Nigel Davenport. The screenplay was written by Leslie Thomas based on his 1975 novel of the same name. It is a sequel to The Virgin Soldiers (1969).

== Plot ==
Two soldiers stationed in Singapore set off in pursuit of the fairer sex instead of carrying out their orders. Soon after their arrival on the exotic island, the two visit a local brothel and there encounter a pair of lusty nurses.

== Cast ==
- Robin Askwith as Pte Brigg
- Nigel Davenport as Sgt Driscoll
- George Layton as Pte Jacobs
- John Le Mesurier as Col Bromley-Pickering
- Warren Mitchell as Morris Morris
- Robin Nedwell as Lt Grainger
- Edward Woodward as Sgt Wellbeloved
- Irene Handl as Mrs Phillimore
- Pamela Stephenson as Bernice
- Lynda Bellingham as Valerie
- David Auker as Lantry
- Fiesta Mei Ling as Juicy Lucy
- Miriam Margolyes as Elephant Ethel
- Patrick Newell as M.O. Billings

== Reception ==
The Monthly Film Bulletin wrote: "Nigel Davenport rallied his men with a certain sweaty conviction when their train was ambushed at the end of the first Virgin Soldiers; he is called upon to perform a similar duty at the end of this desultory sequel, though this time the 'battle' is a distinctly scratch affair, consisting of a perfunctory exchange of fire in what looks unmistakably like an English wood. The knockabout trademark of the Cohen-Smith Confessions movies is stamped all over Stand Up Virgin Soldiers and guarantees that the action of Leslie Thomas' nostalgic novel is lowered to the level of banal trousers-down antics in the barracks with never a thought for plot development or what to do with the several characters introduced to the viewer in some detail and then left floating. Under the circumstances, Davenport's Sgt. Driscoll was probably heartily relieved to be invalided out of this Army."

In the New Statesman, John Coleman called the film "an all-too-British romp manhandled around a crew of National Service conscripts, Singapore, 1950.", adding: "The formula reads a wank, a wink and a weep. A local whore, Juicy Lucy, says 'Fluck off' several times, the gag clearly too good to be wasted; Warren Mitchell does a Welsh striptease; a few recruits die during an unnecessary exercise. The hideous fear arises that this ... may make money."

Marjorie Bilbow wrote in Screen International: "There's bawdy and bawdy and this is the real thing not the plastic imitation. The visual gags, the suggestive double meanings, the candidly blunt comments are real life earthy, not the scripted ruderies of a red-nosed comic who buys jokes in job lots. They express the robust lustings of young men far away from England, Home and Beauty, who secretly yearn for something better than a quick bang in a brothel. The ingenuity of Leslie Thomas's screenplay and Norman Cohen's direction is made plain by the way the jokey introduction to the bedroom scene between Robin Askwith and Pamela Stephenson only enhances the mood of loving tenderness (a very pleasing and touching demonstration of Robin's ability to play a love scene as a love scene should be played). I also admire Norman Cohen's scrupulous avoidance of linking bathos to lubricate the joins between comedy and tragedy. He is dealing with facts elaborated by fiction. The lads are not on manoeuvres on Salisbury Plain; death obeys the rules of chance, not plot construction."
