= Robin Nedwell =

British actor (1946–1999)

- Born: 27 September 1946; Birmingham, Warwickshire, (Note: Birmingham was in Warwickshire at the time of Nedwell's birth, but was later the main part of the new Metropolitan County of West Midlands after boundary changes in 1974.) England
- Died: 1 February 1999 (aged 52); Hedge End, Hampshire, England
- Education: Royal Central School of Speech and Drama
- Years active: 1969–1991
- Spouse: Heather Inglis (m. 1982)
- Children: 1

Robin Courteney Nedwell (27 September 1946 – 1 February 1999) was an English actor, formally trained at Central School of Speech and Drama. He is best remembered for his role as Doctor Duncan Waring in the television comedy series Doctor in the House and its sequels including Doctor Down Under; although he was critically acclaimed for his performance in television series such as The Lovers, The Upchat Connection, The Climber and the ATV comedy-drama Shillingbury Tales. He also featured in several British films.

== Early life and education ==
He was born in Bournville, Birmingham, England to Quaker parents and moved with his family at an early age to Cardiff, Wales, where he was educated at Monkton House preparatory school. He was inspired to be an actor after getting a job working backstage at a theatre. After leaving school he studied at University College, Cardiff and joined a local theatre company, Everyman Theatre Cardiff, and then enrolled in 1966 at the Central School of Speech and Drama studying Stage Acting.

== Career ==
While at drama school, he was spotted by Graham Chapman of Monty Python, which eventually landed Nedwell the role of Doctor Duncan Waring in the hugely popular British television comedy series Doctor in the House (1969–70), which Chapman was a co-writer on. The producer, Humphrey Barclay, talking of Nedwell's audition said "I remember him bounding into the audition room in 1969, an ebullient drama student in a tweed jacket. His natural personality and sense of comedy were immediately apparent and we cast him on the spot. He was entertaining, considerate, and the greatest fun", and recalled his trademark "huge laugh".

Taking a break from the series in 1971 to pursue his interests in film-making and feature film appearances, Nedwell returned in a leading role as Dr. Waring in the sequels Doctor in Charge, Doctor at Sea, Doctor on the Go, Doctor Down Under (filmed in Australia), and Doctor at the Top. Although most of his roles were designed for television, apart from the "Doctor" series, his appearances included Vault of Horror (1973) – along with his "Doctor" co-star Geoffrey Davies – Stand Up, Virgin Soldiers (1977), The Shillingbury Blowers (1980), The Zany Adventures of Robin Hood (1984) and Cluedo (1990). In 1982, Nedwell was in a BFI health and safety film, produced at Abbey National Building Society in Lewisham, called Get Well Soon.

Nedwell's last television role was in Doctor at the Top, which was also the last of the Doctor series'; he became known later in his career for his performances on stage. He appeared in the West End in Brigadoon in 1989, and in 1992, played Max Detweiler in a British tour of The Sound of Music, a production that was also staged at Sadler's Wells. He performed with the Royal Shakespeare Company during the 1995–1996 season, appearing in that year's productions of The Taming of the Shrew (as Grumio), Richard III (as King Richard III) and Ben Jonson's comedy The Devil is an Ass.

== Personal life ==
Nedwell had a romance with co-star Diane Keen. In 1982, Nedwell married PR agent Heather Inglis, with whom he had a daughter, Amie, although the couple later separated. His nephew Oliver is a graduate of the National Film and Television School with several credits on feature length films. Nedwell lived in Hedge End, Hampshire, England,

== Death ==
Nedwell died of a heart attack while waiting for a checkup at his local doctor's surgery, St Luke's in Hedge End, on Monday, 1 February 1999, aged 52. According to his brother Jeremy, who is a doctor, Robin's death was likely linked to a head injury he suffered when he fell off a ladder on Friday, 29 January 1999, while at his parents' house: "He was repairing a roof and dropped five feet onto concrete, he may have suffered a mild stroke. We took him to casualty and he had a few stitches in a head wound, but the hospital were not totally happy with him, over the weekend he was in some discomfort and on Monday he went to his local doctor's surgery. While there he suffered a heart attack, and despite the efforts of the staff they could not revive him."

== Filmography ==
=== Film ===
Year	Title	Role	Note
1973	The Vault of Horror	Tom	
1977	Stand Up, Virgin Soldiers	Lt. Grainger	
1980	The Shillingbury Blowers	Peter Higgins	
1983	A Slice of Life	Toby	
1984	The Zany Adventures of Robin Hood	Will Scarlett	

=== Television ===
Year	Title	Role	Note
1969—1991	Doctor in the House (1969—1970); Doctor in Charge (1972—1973); Doctor at Sea (1974); Doctor on the Go (1975—1977); Doctor Down Under (1979); Doctor at the Top (1991)	Duncan Waring	DITH (26 episodes; DIC (43 episodes); DAS (13 episodes); DOTG (26 episodes); DDU (13 episodes); DATT (7 episodes); Collectively: 128 episodes
1969, 1973	All Star Comedy Carnival	Duncan Waring	Television special
1970—1971	The Lovers	Roland	Ten episodes
1972	Pretenders	Parsons	One episode
1976	Romeo and Juliet	Mercutio	Television film
1976	The Government Inspector	Government Inspector	Three episodes
1978	The English Programme	Mercutio	Eight episodes
1978	The Little Big Show	unknown	
1978	The Upchat Connection	Mike Upchat	Seven episodes
1980—1981	Shillingbury Tales	Peter Higgins	Seven episodes
1981	West End Tales	Fiddler	Four episodes
1981	Take the Stage	unknown	Two episodes
1982	Get Well Soon		BFI health and safety film
1983	The Climbers	Harry Lumsden/Lumsdon	Six episodes
1984	Singles	Malcolm	One episode
1990	Cluedo	Reverend Jonathan Green	Six episodes
