= Doctor in the House (TV series) =

British TV sitcom (ITV, 1969–70)

- Genre: Comedy
- Directed by: David Askey; Maurice Murphy; Mark Stuart; Bill Turner
- Starring: Barry Evans; Robin Nedwell; Geoffrey Davies; George Layton; Ernest Clark
- Country of origin: United Kingdom
- Original language: English
- No. of series: 2
- No. of episodes: 26

Production
- Running time: 25 minutes
- Production company: London Weekend

Original release
- Network: ITV
- Release: 12 July 1969 – 3 July 1970

Related
- Doctor at Large; Doctor in Charge; Doctor at Sea; Doctor on the Go; Doctor Down Under; Doctor at the Top

Doctor in the House is a British television comedy series loosely based on a set of books and a film of the same name by Richard Gordon about the misadventures of a group of medical students. It was produced by London Weekend Television from 1969 to 1970.

The primary writers for the Doctor in the House episodes were Graeme Garden and Bill Oddie. There were also contributions from Graham Chapman, John Cleese, and Barry Cryer. The series was directed by David Askey and Maurice Murphy among others and the producer was Humphrey Barclay. The external establishing shots were of Wanstead Hospital, London (now Clock Court).

It was the first series in a franchise which included six later series, using some of the same cast members and writers. The follow-up series was Doctor at Large.

== Plot ==
The plot revolved around the educational challenges and off-hour antics of a group of medical students at the fictional St. Swithin's teaching hospital in London, focusing on the contrast between the idealistic and somewhat naive Michael Upton and his more worldly and mischievous colleagues.

== Cast ==
- Barry Evans – Michael A. Upton
- Robin Nedwell – Duncan Waring
- Geoffrey Davies – Dick Stuart-Clark
- George Layton – Paul Collier
- Simon Cuff – Dave Briddock
- Yutte Stensgaard – Helga, Dave's girlfriend
- Martin Shaw – Huw Evans (series 1)
- Jonathan Lynn – Daniel Hooley (series 2)
- Ernest Clark – Professor Geoffrey Loftus
- Ralph Michael – The Dean
- Joan Benham – Mrs Loftus
- Peter Bathurst – Dr Upton, Michael's father

Well-known actors David Jason (Only Fools and Horses), and James Beck (Dad's Army), both appeared in the 1970 Series 2 episode: "What Seems to be the Trouble?".

== Episodes ==
Series	Episodes	Originally released	
Series	Episodes	First released	Last released
1	13	12 July 1969	3 October 1969
2	13	10 April 1970	3 July 1970

=== Series 1 (1969) ===
No. overall	No. in series	Title	Written by	Original release date
1	1	"Why Do You Want to be a Doctor?"	John Cleese and Graham Chapman	12 July 1969
2	2	"Settling In"	Graeme Garden and Bill Oddie	19 July 1969
3	3	"It's All Go..."	Graeme Garden and Bill Oddie	26 July 1969
4	4	"Peace and Quiet"	Graeme Garden and Bill Oddie	2 August 1969
5	5	"The Students Are Revolting!"	Graeme Garden and Bill Oddie	9 August 1969
6	6	"Rallying Round..."	Graeme Garden and Bill Oddie	16 August 1969
7	7	"If in Doubt – Cut it Out!"	Graeme Garden and Bill Oddie	23 August 1969
8	8	"The War of the Mascots"	Graham Chapman and Barry Cryer	30 August 1969
9	9	"Getting the Bird"	Graham Chapman and Barry Cryer	6 September 1969
10	10	"The Rocky Mountain Spotted Fever Casino"	Graeme Garden and Bill Oddie	13 September 1969
11	11	"Keep It Clean!"	Graeme Garden and Bill Oddie	19 September 1969
12	12	"All for Love..."	Graeme Garden and Bill Oddie	26 September 1969
13	13	"Pass or Fail"	Graham Chapman and Barry Cryer	3 October 1969

=== Series 2 (1970) ===
No. overall	No. in series	Title	Written by	Original release date
14	1	"It's All in the Little Blue Book"	Graeme Garden and Bill Oddie	10 April 1970
15	2	"What Seems to be the Trouble?"	Graeme Garden and Bill Oddie	17 April 1970
16	3	"Take Off Your Clothes... and Hide"	Graeme Garden and Bill Oddie	24 April 1970
17	4	"Nice Bodywork – Lovely Finish"	Graeme Garden and Bill Oddie	1 May 1970
18	5	"Look Into My Eyes"	Graeme Garden and Bill Oddie	8 May 1970
19	6	"Put Your Hand on That"	Graeme Garden and Bill Oddie	15 May 1970
20	7	"The Royal Visit"	Graeme Garden and Bill Oddie	22 May 1970
21	8	"If You Can Help Somebody...Don't!"	Graeme Garden and Bill Oddie	29 May 1970
22	9	"Hot Off the Presses"	Graeme Garden and Bill Oddie	5 June 1970
23	10	"A Stitch in Time"	Graeme Garden and Bill Oddie	12 June 1970
24	11	"May the Best Man..."	Graeme Garden and Bill Oddie	19 June 1970
25	12	"Doctor on the Box"	Graeme Garden and Bill Oddie	26 June 1970
26	13	"Finals"	Graeme Garden and Bill Oddie	3 July 1970
