= Gail Renard =

Canadian author/screenwriter

- Born: New York
- Occupation: Writer, producer, performer

Website
- www.gailrenard.com

Gail Renard is a writer, producer and performer. She is the current treasurer and former chair of the Writers' Guild of Great Britain (WGGB) and is a vocal supporter of writers, lobbying through the WGGB, in Westminster and Brussels.

== Early life ==
At the age of 16, she joined John Lennon and Yoko Ono for their "Bed-In for Peace" protest in order to interview them for a school paper.

She describes how Lennon sat with her on the floor and wrote out the lyrics to "Give Peace a Chance" on a piece of card in large letters so that people could read it as they sang along for a recording of the song.

Lennon gave her the lyrics and they were auctioned in 2008

Her TV writing career was encouraged by John Cleese who introduced her to radio and television producers.

== Awards ==
Renard's Custer's Last Stand Up won the BAFTA for best British Children's Series in 2001.

== Filmography ==
Television work by Gail Renard
Year	Title	Writer	Producer	Performer	Notes
1972-1973	Doctor in Charge	Yes	No	No	
1974	Doctor at Sea	Yes	No	No	Wrote 2 episodes
1975-1977	Doctor on the Go	Yes	No	No	Wrote 2 episodes, one of which 'A Turn for the Nurse' attracted commentary for being written by two women.
1975-1977	Kim & Co	Yes	No	No	Wrote 1 episode 1975
1978–1979	The Famous Five	Yes	No	No	
	Pipkins	Yes	No	No	
	All About Babies	Yes	No	No	
1977-1981	Robin's Nest	Yes	No	No	Wrote episode 33 Albert's Ball
1987-2009	ChuckleVision	Yes	No	No	Wrote Series 10 E11, Series 11 E1, E5 & E15 Series 12 E4, E8 & E12
2001	Custer's Last Stand Up	Yes	Yes	No	Creator and also wrote most of the episodes.
2020	Monty & Co	Yes	Yes	No	

== Bibliography ==
=== Non-fiction ===
Name	Year	Author (Other)	ISBN	Notes
Give Me a Chance: My Eight Days with John and Yoko	2010		ISBN 978-1406323078	
