= On-ramping =

On-ramping refers to the process of re-entering the workforce after taking a career break. This can be the result of needing to take care of family, taking a break professionally to explore other passions, or many other reasons. It is paired with the term "off-ramping", or exiting the workforce as a temporary career break.

The Hidden Brain Drain, a taskforce led by economist Sylvia Ann Hewlett, defined the term as

many professional women in the US do not drop out of their careers altogether, but they do take breaks. However, they often find it difficult to re-enter the workforce. This has been called 'off-ramping' (taking time out of a career for one reason or another) and 'on-ramping' (rejoining the career path). Women in the US, on average, spend a relatively short amount of time off-ramped (around 2.2 years), but even this can incur financial penalties. Women who spend around three years off-ramp see their earning power decrease by 37 per cent.

A study by the Center for Work-Life Policy found that more than 90 percent of those women who off-ramp eventually wish to on-ramp back into the work force.

The term appears as early as 2005, reaching public mention on NPR that same year. The term appears in articles in publications such as the Wall Street Journal by 2006, and by 2008 appears in formal training materials for organizations such as the American Institute of Certified Public Accountants as a business best practice.
