= Bernard McKenna (writer) =

British screenwriter (born 1944)

- Born: 1944 (age 81–82); Scotland, United Kingdom
- Writing career
- Language: English
- Genres: Television, comedy, screenwriting

Bernard McKenna (1944-2026) was a Scottish writer/producer who had written, or co-written, many hours of British television comedy. He was most known for his work with Graham Chapman of Monty Python fame as well as his collaborations with Peter Cook and Douglas Adams. He occasionally worked as an actor, and had several roles in Monty Python's Life of Brian.

McKenna taught creative writing, screenwriting and comedy at the University of Winchester.

== Writing ==
His writing work included:

| Year | Title | Network | Notes |
|---|---|---|---|
| 1970 | Hark at Barker | LWT | 7 episodes |
| 1971 | Doctor at Large | LWT | 10 episodes |
| 1971 | Six Dates with Barker | LWT | Episode: "1970: The Odd Job" |
| 1972 | Comedy Playhouse | BBC | Episode: "Idle at Work" |
| 1972 – 1973 | Doctor in Charge | LWT | 16 episodes |
| 1974 | Doctor at Sea | LWT | 6 episodes |
| 1974 | The Top Secret Life of Edgar Briggs | LWT | 13 episodes |
| 1975 – 1977 | Doctor on the Go | LWT | 10 episodes |
| 1976 | Out of the Trees | BBC | Pilot |
| 1978 | The Odd Job | n/a | Film |
| 1978 – 1979 | Robin's Nest | Thames Television | 4 episodes |
| 1979 | Doctor Down Under | Seven Network | 5 episodes |
| 1980 | Peter Cook & Co | LWT | TV Special |
| 1981 | It Takes a Worried Man | Thames Television | 1 Episode |
| 1982 | Shelley | Thames Television | Episode: "Credit Where Credit Is Due" |
| 1983 | Yellowbeard | n/a | Film |
| 1987 – 1988 | Me and My Girl | LWT | 9 episodes |
| 1990 – 1991 | Boon | Central | 2 episodes |
| 1993 | Get Back | BBC | Episode: "Money" |
| 1996 | Bad Boys | BBC | Episode: "The Bonny Bonny Banks" |
| 1997 | Pilgrim's Rest | BBC | Episode: "Poor Relations" |
| 2000 | Brotherly Love | BBC | 6 episodes |

== Production ==
His production work included:

| Year | Title | Network | Notes |
|---|---|---|---|
| 1992 | The New Statesman | Yorkshire Television | 6 episodes |
| 1992 – 1993 | Get Back | BBC | 15 episodes |
| 1993 | Over The Rainbow | Meridian | 8 episodes |

== Actor ==
| Year | Title | Role | Notes |
|---|---|---|---|
| 1972 | My Childhood | Tommy's Father | Film |
| 1973 | My Ain Folk | Tommy's Father | Film |
| 1979 | Effects | Barney | Film |
| 1979 | Monty Python's Life of Brian | Parvus / Official Stoners Helper / Giggling Guard / Sergeant | Film |
| 1983 | Yellowbeard | Askey | Film |
| 1989 | A Connecticut Yankee in King Arthur's Court | Peasant | TV Movie |
| 1996 | Bad Boys | Callum | Episode: "The Bonny Bonny Banks" |
