= Geoffrey Davies =

English actor (1938–2023)

- Born: 15 December 1938; Leeds, West Riding of Yorkshire, England
- Died: 13 July 2023 (aged 84)
- Years active: 1969–2012
- Spouse: Ann Davies (1962–2023)
- Children: Emma

Geoffrey Walsh Davies (15 December 1938 – 13 July 2023) was an English actor. He is best known for his role as Dr. Dick Stuart-Clark in all seven of the Doctors programmes that aired from 1969 to 1991.

== Early life ==
Geoffrey Walsh Davies was born in Leeds to Harry and Emma Davies. His father was an accountant. Davies was educated at grammar school and studied at art college to be a commercial artist at the card and board games manufacturer Waddingtons

Geoffrey left Waddingtons after he was called up for national service. After he left national service, he decided to become an actor and worked with a drama group at the Leeds Civic Theatre in the evenings. After being suggested by a journalist, Geoffrey joined the White Rose Players repertory company in Harrogate as a stage director, also working in Sheffield, before doing a two-year course at the Royal Academy of Dramatic Art at the suggestion of Benjamin Whitrow.

== Career ==
While he was still at RADA, he was spotted by a member of Noël Coward's company, who got him his first role in the film Oh! What a Lovely War as Lieutenant Faversham.

A year after he left drama school, he was cast as Dr. Dick Stuart-Clark in the sitcom Doctor in the House. Davies later revealed that he didn't get the role at first: "I spoke to my agent when I heard that ITV were casting Doctor in the House, but every part had gone, then, the actor who was due to play medical student Dr Stuart-Clark dropped out and I got an audition". He is the only member of the original cast to have performed in all the sequels, Doctor at Large, Doctor in Charge, Doctor at Sea, Doctor on the Go, Doctor Down Under – filmed in Australia – and Doctor at the Top. Davies was "so convincing" as an actor that one time he was actually mistaken as a person in the medical field: "I once pulled up at a traffic accident to see if everything was all right when someone saw me and said, 'It’s OK, we’ve got a doctor'". Davies also appeared in the shows stage production that toured in Australia in 1974, and its follow up show Doctor in Love in 1979.

Davies moved with the cast of Doctor Down Under to Australia from 1979 to 1980, and for four episodes from 1981 to 1984, Davies went to Jersey to play Roger Dubree in the crime drama show Bergerac. Back in the UK, he appeared in Bergerac and at Windsor and the Old Vic where he was in The Ghost Train. Davies also appeared in a Cinderella pantomime, where he played the role of Buttons, the servant of Cinderella's stepfather, and Cinderella's friend. He toured a number of times in the Far East as well as Australia and New Zealand. Davies said of working in theatre: "Television is fun, but there’s nothing like going out on stage and playing to a live audience".

In 1992 he played a barrister in an episode of Families, which also featured his daughter Emma and in 2002, he played Judge Phelps-Gordon, who sentenced Little Mo Mitchell to prison for murder, in five episodes of EastEnders. Also in 2002, he was in the stage show Murdered to Death, a spoof on Agatha Christie's novels. His last roles were in 2012; one as a clown in an episode of the Television show Not Going Out and as a man in a queue in the film Run for Your Wife.

== Personal life and death ==
Davies was married to Ann Wheeler Davies since 1962. Their daughter, Emma Davies, is also an actress having appeared in film and television roles since the mid-1980s. He has a grandchild.

Geoffrey Davies died on 13 July 2023, at the age of 84.

== Filmography ==
=== Film ===
Year	Title	Role	Notes
1969	Oh! What a Lovely War	Lieutenant Faversham	
1970	1917	Lt. Gessel	
1970	Doctor in Trouble	Doctor	Uncredited
1973	The Vault of Horror	Jerry	
2009	Waiting for Gorgo	Mr Tunstall	
2012	Run for Your Wife	Man in queue	

=== Television ===
Year	Title	Role	Notes
1969—1991	Doctor in the House (1969—1970); Doctor at Large (1971); Doctor in Charge (1972—1973); Doctor at Sea (1974); Doctor on the Go (1975—1977); Doctor Down Under (1979); Doctor at the Top (1991)	Dick Stuart-Clark	DITH (24 episodes); DAL (21 episodes); DIC (37 episodes); DAS (13 episodes); DOTG (26 episodes); DDU (13 episodes); DATT (7 episodes); Collectively: 141 episodes
1969, 1973	All Star Comedy Carnival	Dick Stuart-Clark	Two television specials
1981	The Other 'Arf	Charles II	One episode
1981—1984	Bergerac	Roger Dubree	Four episodes
1987	The Bretts	Lord Wishbury	One episode
1989—1990	The Labours of Erica	Dexter Rook	Twelve episodes
1990	Woof!	Mr. Morgan	One episode
1994	Law and Disorder	Harold	Two episodes
1995	Paul Merton's Life of Comedy	Doctor	One episode
1995	Stick with Me, Kid	Lyle Fairbob	One episode
2002	EastEnders	Judge Phelps-Gordon	Five episodes
2008	Casualty	Gilbert Gavin	One episode
2009	Doctors	Charlie Myers	One episode
2012	Not Going Out	Clown	One episode
