= George Layton =

British actor, director and author (born 1942)

- Born: George Michael William Rafael Löwy; 2 March 1942 (age 84); Bradford, England
- Occupations: Actor; author; theatre director; screenwriter; performer; writer
- Years active: 1964–present
- Known for: It Ain't Half Hot Mum (1974–1975); Don't Wait Up (1983–1990); Executive Stress (1986-1988)
- Spouses: Vera Hodges (m. 1968, divorced); Moya Smylie (m. 1977)
- Children: 4
- Website: georgelayton.co.uk

George Layton (born George Michael William Rafael Löwy; 2 March 1942) is a British actor, director, and television comedy writer best known for three television roles: junior doctor Paul Collier in the comedy series Doctor in the House and its sequels Doctor at Large, Doctor in Charge, and Doctor at the Top; bombardier 'Solly' Solomons in the first two series of It Ain't Half Hot Mum; and Des the mechanic in early episodes of Minder. His TV writing credits include several "Doctor" series episodes as well as some in Robin's Nest, Don't Wait Up, and Executive Stress.

== Early life ==
Layton was born George Michael William Rafael Löwy in Bradford, West Riding of Yorkshire, England to Fritz and Edith Löwy (née Hecht), the second of three children (an older brother, Peter and a younger sister, Viv). Both of Layton's parents were Austrian Jews who fled their native Vienna to England just before the outbreak of the Second World War. His grandfather, Victor Hecht, fled to England with his wife and sent the letter to George's parents that led them to moving to the UK. When they arrived, they could not speak English, and worked as a butler and maid.

The family moved to Surrey before settling in Bradford where Layton was born in Bradford Royal Infirmary. They lived in a house in Manningham, Bradford, where they shared a house with another family of refugees Layton's father had met (in total four adults and six children). Layton attended Lilly Croft Primary School in 1947 and played Puck in a school production of A Midsummer Night's Dream, which got him into acting. He was educated at Belle Vue Boys' Grammar School in Bradford. During his teenage years, he earned seven shillings and a sixpence every Saturday delivering groceries on a bike.

In January 1957 Layton and his best friend Roger Selby were at Selby's aunt and uncle's house in Edinburgh during the holidays; they went to different schools and Layton's school's holidays ended early, so he called in sick so he could stay in Scotland, and with Selby climbed the Arthur's Seat mountainous hill, by the time they got up to the top it was dark so they took a shortcut which led them to the edge of a cliff overhanging a 60-foot drop; unable to go up or down they yelled for help until the police came and attempted to rescue them however they also got stuck. After the fire brigade were called, they were successfully brought back down. According to Selby, the incident was "splashed all over the national press" including Bradford's Telegraph & Argus, which got Layton in trouble as the school's headmaster, believing he was sick, had read the paper.

== Career ==
In an interview for Talking Pictures TV in April 2020, he mentioned his work on the BBC's Children's Hour at the former BBC Studios at Piccadilly, Manchester, where he came under the influence and guidance of Trevor Hill, Violet Carson and Doris Gamble. He then studied acting at the Royal Academy of Dramatic Art, studying in the same class as Mike Leigh, Martin Jarvis and Ian McShane, where he won the Emile Littler award for most promising actor and The Denys Blakelock Award for an outstanding performance in a minor role. He graduated in 1962. After graduating, he joined Belgrade Theatre. Layton auditioned for the role of Terry Collier in The Likely Lads, however the producers deemed that he was not a household name and the role was given to James Bolam.

He went on to leading parts at Coventry and Nottingham and in 1963 appeared on Broadway in Chips with Everything, the production lasted for six months but according to Layton the assassination of John F. Kennedy forced the show to be stopped. Layton's big break came in 1969 with the show Doctor in the House, in which he played Paul Collier. He would later reprise this role many times for other Doctor-related series' such as the 1971 show Doctor at Large, the 1972—73 show Doctor in Charge and the 1991 sitcom Doctor at the Top. His other television writing credits during this time with Jonathan Lynn include episodes of On the Buses, Nearest and Dearest, Romany Jones and My Name Is Harry Worth. Layton wrote for the first series of Doctor at Large under the pseudonym "Oliver Fry". and contributed scripts under his own name to subsequent series in the "Doctor" franchise. Layton was part of the team that wrote most of the episodes of series 4-6 of Robin's Nest and was the creator and primary writer of Don't Wait Up (1983–90) and Executive Stress (1986–88) respectively.

Layton was cast as Bombardier "Solly" Solomons in It Ain't Half Hot Mum. He appeared in sixteen episodes of the first two series before he left the show after the second series when he felt that his character was not developing enough, which led to show co-creator David Croft telling him "if you're not happy, you can leave". Solomons was written out of the show and in the first episode of the third series it was mentioned that he was demobbed. Despite leaving, Layton remained friends with Croft and Jimmy Perry. Layton also appeared in an Australian production called Funny Peculiar in 1977 and later took over the role of Fagin from Roy Hudd in 1979 in the first London revival of Oliver! at the Albery Theatre. He also appeared in two episodes of The Sweeney and made a few early appearances as himself on the light entertainment BBC1 consumer show That's Life!.

In the 1980s, he played the recurring character Des in the hit comedy-drama Minder. In a 2021 interview with Paul Stenning, Layton described how he left Minder temporarily as he had committed to a pantomime and regretted he lost his role in the show. From 1999 to 2000, he appeared in all fourteen episodes of the show Sunburn, starring Michelle Collins. In 1999, he was the subject of an episode of This is Your Life. In 2011, he played a love interest to Pat Butcher on EastEnders. Layton has written three books of short stories, entitled The Fib and Other Stories, The Swap and Other Stories and The Trick and Other Stories. The tales describe family life in the North of England after the Second World War. The books have been part of the National Curriculum in British schools, and film versions are being planned. Myles McDowell quotes Layton's The Balaclava Story as an example of how adults are often mostly absent from children's fiction.

== Personal life ==
Layton lives in north London with his second wife, Moya Smylie, who he met in 1974 and married three years later. He married his first wife, Vera Hodges, in 1968 but they later divorced. He has four children, two with Vera and two with Moya. From his first marriage, he has Tristan, who works for charity and Claudie, who is a producer. From his second marriage, he has Danny, a former musical director for Endemol and Hannah, a comedy agent.

Layton's older brother Peter is an artist in studio glass.

Layton is a supporter of Bradford City.

== Filmography ==
=== Film ===
Year	Title	Role	Notes
1968	Here We Go Round the Mulberry Bush	Gordon	
1969	Mosquito Squadron	Pilot Officer	uncredited
1975	Carry On Behind	Doctor	
1976	Confessions of a Driving Instructor	Tony Bender	
1977	Stand Up, Virgin Soldiers	Pvt. Jacobs	
1999	Don't Go Breaking My Heart	Max	
2013	One Candle One Man	GKO	

=== Television ===
Year	Title	Role	Notes
1961	BBC Sunday-Night Play	Workman	Episode: "Wet Fish"
1964	ITV Play of the Week	Pvt. Root	Episode: "The Other Man"
1964	Swizzlewick	Eustace Madden	18 episodes
1965	The Likely Lads	Mario	2 episodes
1965	Emergency-Ward 10	Gordon Hurst	2 episodes
1965	Theatre 625	Alan	Episode: "Enter Solly Gold"
1965–1966	United!	Jimmy Stokes	85 episodes
1966	Thirty-Minute Theatre	Herbert Wallwork	Episode: "The Spoken Word"
1967	Sir Arthur Conan Doyle	Rudge	Episode: "The Black Doctor"
1968	Len and the River Mob	Len Tanner	All 10 episodes
1968	Detective	Mervans	Episode: "Deaths on the Champs Elysees"
1969	The Wednesday Play	Pete	Episode: "Sling Your Hook"
1969	Doctor Who	Technician Penn	Serial: The Space Pirates
1969	Dixon of Dock Green	Billy Tate	Episode: "Whose Turn Next"
1969	The Root of All Evil?	Thomas	Episode: "What's in It for Me?"
1969	Z-Cars	Grady	2 episodes
1969, 1971	The Liver Birds	Joe	2 episodes
1969–1970	Doctor in the House	Junior Dr Paul Collier	Main role
1970	ITV Sunday Night Theatre	Corporal May	Episode: "Lay Down Your Arms"
1970	Z-Cars	Todd	Episode: "The Little Woman: Part 2"
1971	Coronation Street	Barney Shelton	2 episodes
1971	It's Awfully Bad for Your Eyes, Darling	Gus	Episode: "The Flat to Ourselves"
1971	Doctor at Large	Junior Dr Paul Collier	Recurring role
1973	Doctor in Charge	Junior Dr Paul Collier	Recurring role
1974–1975	It Ain't Half Hot Mum	Bombardier 'Solly' Solomons	16 episodes
1975	Comedy Premiere	Richard Bunting	Episode: "For Richer for Poorer"
1975	The Sweeney	Ray Stackpole	2 episodes
1975–1976	My Brother's Keeper	Brian Booth	All 13 episodes
1979–1981	Robin's Nest	Vernon Potter	3 episodes
1979–1982	Minder	Des	6 episodes
1980	Keep It in the Family	Freddy	Episode: "Smoke Without Fire"
1981	Pigeon Street	Narrator	Voice
1982	Kelly Monteith	Various	2 episodes
1986	The Kenny Everett Television Show	Various	4 episodes
1987	French and Saunders	The Doctor	Unaired Doctor Who sketch
1988, 1989	The Les Dennis Laughter Show	Various	2 episodes
1991	Josie Smith	Narrator	Voice
1991	Joshua Jones	Narrator, Joshua Jones, Additional voices	Voice
1992	Doctor at the Top	Junior Dr Paul Collier	Main role
1994	All Night Long	Larry Morse	Episode: #1.6
1994	Dig & Dug with Daisy	Narrator	Voice; all episodes
1999–2000	Sunburn	Alan Brooks	All 14 episodes
2000	Metropolis	Mr. Jacobs	2 episodes
2004	Holby City	Howard Martin	Episode: "Baptism of Fire"
2005	Nova	Emilie's Father	Episode: "E=mc²: Einstein's Big Idea"
2006	Heartbeat	Graham Simpson	Episode: "Hearts and Flowers"
2007	The Bill	Dr. Michael Sanderson	Episode: "Back from the Dead"
2008	Doctors	Ashish Mountjoy	Episode: "The Universe Provides"
2011–2012	EastEnders	Norman Simmonds	24 episodes
2012	Doctors	George Simpson	Episode: "Walter"
2014	Boomers	Dennis	Episode: "The Sixties Weekender"
2015	Doctors	Rod Buckwell	Episode: "Mods and Rockers"
2015	Casualty	Clive Jones	Episode: "A Moment of Clarity"
2015	Vicious	Andrew	Episode: "Stag Do"
2018	Casualty	Geordie McDale	Episode: #32.40
2023	The Madame Blanc Mysteries	Martin Harris	Episode: "Christmas Special"

== Selected theatre ==
As actor:

- Billy Liar as Geoffrey Fisher (King's Head, Islington)
- The Caucasian Chalk Circle as Lavrenti (Belgrade Theatre, Coventry)
- Chicago as Amos Hart (Adelphi Theatre, London)
- Chips With Everything as First Corporal (Royal Court and Broadway)
- How to Succeed in Business Without Really Trying as Ponty (New Theatre, Bromley)
- More Lies About Jerzy as Jerzy Kosinski (New End Theatre, Hampstead)
- The Odd Couple as Felix (Theatre Royal, Windsor)
- Oliver! as Fagin Albery Theatre 1978/9 then at the(London Palladium)
- Twelfth Night as Feste (Belgrade Theatre, Coventry)

As director:

- Barefoot in the Park (Cambridge Theatre Company)
- Dangerous Corner (Cambridge Theatre Company)
- Aladdin (Theatre Royal, Bath)
- Dick Whittington (Shaw Theatre)
