= Ernest Clark =

British actor (1912–1994)

- Born: 12 February 1912; Maida Vale, London, England
- Died: 11 November 1994 (aged 82); Hinton St. George, Somerset, England
- Years active: 1937–1994
- Spouse(s): Rosamond Burne m.1940-? (divorced); Avril Hillyer m.1954-? (divorced); Julia Lockwood m.1972–1994 (his death) (4 children)
- Children: 4
- Awards: Military Cross

Ernest Clark MC (12 February 1912 – 11 November 1994) was a British actor of stage, television and film.

== Early life ==
Clark was the son of a master builder in Maida Vale, and was educated nearby at St Marylebone Grammar School. After leaving school he became a reporter on a local newspaper in Croydon. He had always wanted to be an actor and when offered a job with the local rep, he took it and apart from six years in the army during World War II, during which he won the Military Cross, he remained in the profession.

== Career ==
His first stage appearance was at the Festival Theatre, Cambridge in 1937, and he went on to appear in plays at both the West End in London, and Broadway in New York.

In 1955 he appeared on stage in Witness for the Prosecution at Henry Miller's Theatre in New York City, and on film as Air Vice-Marshal The Honourable Ralph Cochrane AFC RAF, AOC, No. 5 Group RAF in The Dam Busters (1955).

He is perhaps best remembered for his role as the irascible Professor Geoffrey Loftus in the television comedy series Doctor in the House and its sequels, apart from Doctor at Sea, in which he appeared as Captain Norman Loftus (the brother of Professor Loftus). Between 1967 to 1969, he also played the stern and ascetic Dean in two series of the BBC sitcom All Gas and Gaiters, replacing John Barron in the role. Clark left after Series 3, and was replaced by Barron who reprised his role for the last two series.

Clark was president of the actors' trade union Equity from 1969 to 1973.

== Personal life and death ==
He married three times: one of his wives was actress Avril Hillyer, the first two marriages were dissolved. His third marriage, from 1972 until his death, was to Julia Lockwood (née Margaret Julia Leon, 1941-2019), the actress daughter of the British film star Margaret Lockwood, with whom he had four children, Timothy, Nicholas, Lucy and Katharine. He died 11 November 1994 in Hinton St. George, Somerset, aged 82.

== Filmography ==
- Private Angelo – (uncredited)
- Obsession – (uncredited)
- Seven Days to Noon (1950) – Barber (uncredited)
- The Mudlark (1950) – Hammond (uncredited)
- The Long Memory (1952) – Prosecuting Counsel (uncredited)
- Doctor in the House (1954) – Dr. Parrish
- Father Brown (1954) – Bishop's Secretary
- Beau Brummell (1954) – Dr. Warren
- The Dam Busters (1955) – Air Vice-Marshall Ralph Cochrane. AOC, No.5 Group RAF
- 1984 (1956) – Outer Party Announcer
- Reach for the Sky (1956) – Wing Commander Beiseigel
- The Baby and the Battleship (1956) – Cmdr. Geoffrey Digby
- Stars in Your Eyes (1956) – Ronnie
- The Man in the Sky (1957) – Maine
- Time Without Pity (1957) – Under Secretary – Home Office
- The Birthday Present (1958) – Barrister
- A Tale of Two Cities (1958) – Stryver
- I Accuse! (1958) – Prosecutor – 1st Dreyfus trial
- The Safecracker (1958) – Major Adbury
- A Woman of Mystery (1958) – Harvey
- Blind Spot (1958) – F. G. Fielding
- A Touch of Larceny (1959) – Cmdr. Bates
- Sink the Bismarck! (1960) – Captain (Suffolk)
- No Love for Johnnie (1961) – M.P. (uncredited)
- Three on a Spree (1961) – Col. Drew
- Partners in Crime (1961) – Ashton
- Edgar Wallace Mysteries (Time to Remember) episode (1962) – Cracknell
- The Wild and the Willing (1962) – Vice Chancellor
- Tomorrow at Ten (1962) – Dr. Towers
- Master Spy (1963) – Doctor Pembury
- Billy Liar (1963) – Prison Governor
- Ladies Who Do (1963) – Stockbroker
- A Stitch in Time (1963) – Prof. Crankshaw
- Nothing But the Best (1964) – Roberts
- The Devil-Ship Pirates (1964) – Sir Basil Smeeton
- Boy with a Flute (1964) Short)
- Masquerade (1965) – Minister
- The Secret of My Success (1965) – Earl of Aldershot's solicitor
- Arabesque (1966) – Beauchamp
- Finders Keepers (1966) – Air Marshall
- It! (1967) – Harold Grove
- Cuckoo Patrol (1967) – Marshall
- Attack on the Iron Coast (1968) – Air Vice Marshall Woodbridge
- Salt and Pepper (1968) – Col. Balson
- Castle Keep (1969) – British Colonel (uncredited)
- The Executioner (1970) – Roper
- Song of Norway (1970) – Councilman
- Gandhi (1982) – Lord Hunter
- Memed, My Hawk (1984) – Father
- The Pope Must Die (1991) – Abbot
