= Here We Go Round the Mulberry Bush (disambiguation) =

Here We Go Round the Mulberry Bush is a traditional nursery rhyme. The phrase may also refer to:

- Here We Go Round the Mulberry Bush (novel), by Hunter Davies
- Here We Go Round the Mulberry Bush (film), based on the book
- Here We Go Round the Mulberry Bush (Traffic song), the title song to the film, performed by Traffic
