= Naughty! =

1971 British documentary film by Stanley Long

- Theatrical release quad poster
- Directed by: Stanley Long
- Written by: Suzanne Mercer
- Story by: Stanley Long; Suzanne Mercer
- Produced by: Stanley Long executive Barry Jacobs
- Music by: Cliff Twemlow
- Production company: Salon Productions
- Release date: 1971
- Running time: 83 mins
- Country: United Kingdom
- Language: English

Naughty, also known as Naughty! A Report on Pornography and Erotica, is a 1971 British dramatised documentary film directed by Stanley Long and written by Suzanne Mercer. Long said that, although the movie was sold as a sex film, it was "a fairly serious film" which "had some purpose". Mercer called it "a serious sociological look at pornography and erotica". It mixes interviews with archived footage and re-enactments, and was screened at the Wet Dream Film Festival in Amsterdam in 1971. The same team later made a similar movie, On the Game (1974).

== Cast ==
- Chris Lethbridge-Baker as Horace
- Lee Donald as Papa
- Brenda Peters as Mama
- Jane Cardew as Papa's mistress
- Nina Francis as daughter
- Shane Raggett as son
- Lois Penson as maiden aunt
- Olive McFarland as Mary Wilson
- Heather Chasen as Victorian madame
- Al Goldstein as himself
- Richard Neville as himself
- Germaine Greer as herself

== Reception ==
Monthly Film Bulletin said "Publicised as a 'report on pornography and erotica through the ages', Naughty! in fact emerges as a cheaply-made mish-mash of interviews, reportage on the Amsterdam 'Wet Dream Festival', and some clumsily staged scenes illustrating the hypocrisy and depravity of the Victorians. The historical scenes are badly done, with many of them relying on jokily speeded-up action and jangly piano accompaniment in a weak attempt at light-heartedness. Yet despite the overall ineptness, several of the contemporary interviews have the fascination of the truly bizarre: evidently genuine discussions with the director and cast of a blue movie (before, during and after the 'action'); the chat with a madame who specialises in bondage; and the rather touching confession of a suburban couple, whose search for sexual variety was apparently sparked by the wife becoming fed up with the husband's constant desire to spank her."

The Sun called it "just another 'raincoat' film dressed up as 'educational' language."
