= Suzanne Mercer =

British screenwriter (c.1946–?)

Suzanne Mercer (born c.1946) was a British screenwriter who wrote a number of films for Stanley A. Long. She is best known for writing Groupie Girl (1970), based on her own personal experience.

== Biography ==
Mercer grew up in Newcastle and was married to a member of the band Juicy Lucy. In a 1977 interview she said "In my view, no woman need be oppressed or repressed. I’m a chick, married for seven years, and I lead an independent life. I work in a very tough business."

== Select credits ==
- Love You till Tuesday (1969) – assistant to producer
- Groupie Girl (1970)
- Bread (1971)
- Naughty! (1971)
- On the Game (1973)
- Adventures of a Taxi Driver (1976)
