= West End Jungle =

1961 British drama-documentary film by Arnold Louis Miller

- Theatrical release poster
- Directed by: Arnold Louis Miller
- Produced by: Stanley Long; Arnold Louis Miller
- Starring: Andria Lawrence; Vicki Woolf
- Narrated by: David Gell
- Cinematography: Stanley Long
- Music by: De Wolfe
- Production company: Searchlight
- Distributed by: Miracle Films
- Release date: 1961
- Running time: 55 minutes
- Country: United Kingdom
- Language: English

West End Jungle is a 1961 British drama documentary film directed by Arnold Louis Miller and starring Andria Lawrence and Vicki Woolf. It focuses on the issue of prostitution.

== Content ==
West End Jungle examines the consequences of the introduction of the Street Offences Act 1959. Until then, as many as 10,000 prostitutes lined the streets and alleys of Soho, facing a deterrent of only a small fine. The film explains what happened when the streets were cleaned up, and it looks at what became of the so-called oldest profession as it continued to operate in Britain.

The film claims that: "The streets of London have been swept, apparently, clean, but the dirt still remains out of sight. It's still there in the West End Jungle"; Labour peer Lord Morrison, in his position as president of the British Board of Film Censors, had West End Jungle banned, declaring that the film would bring London into disrepute. The scenarios and narration of West End Jungle are sensational, evoking the lurid pulp fiction of the time. The film warns, for example: "by getting in that car she is taking the irrevocable step to degradation and eventual self-disgust".

== Cast ==
- David Gell: Narrator
- Andria Lawrence
- Vicki Woolf
- Tom Macaulay
- Nat Mills as Punter
- Heather Russell
- Tom Bowman
- Terry James
- Peter Baker
- Denis Cleary
- David Grey
- Marcel de Villiers
- Margaret Trace
- George McGrath
- Mavis Hoffman
- Pamela Rees
- Roy Denton
- Laurence Hepworth
- Marilyn Ridge
- Janette Rowsell
- Laura Thurlow
- Desmond Newling
- Valerie Drew
- Nicholas Tannar
- Jan Williams
- Minush Fabinah
- Kathleen Grace
- Roy Stephens
- Michael Lee

== Production ==
The cast included a number of friends and family of the crew; among them, director Miller's uncle, Nat Mills, one half of the Nat Mills and Bobby comedy team of the 1940s. Much of the filming was done at night, making the film seem like a time capsule, with the smoky nightclubs, seedy back alleys, and neon signs of 1960s Soho.

== Critical reception ==
Monthly Film Bulletin said "Undeniably factual and well-organised, employing actors to help pad out its generous air of outrage, the film draws only the most obvious of conclusions: that while Demand continues to exist, Supply will continue to be forthcoming. The accent throughout is on the gullibility and stupidity of men who are induced to part with their money for the sake of tawdry and degrading pleasures. The presentation avoids glamorisation and sensationalism, but the high moral tone of the commentary is not exactly edifying in itself. There is an attempt to see "the funny side" oly some of the sordid transactions. But in the main the attitude is one of contempt for the people who make the money out of their beer joints, strip clubs and massage establishments, and pity for the girls who get sucked down into a life of humiliation. Nothing, perhaps, is quite so pathetic as the episode – which has its comic overtones – in which a lonely young man visits a "photographic model" in depressing surroundings."
