= Bread (1971 film) =

1971 British film by Stanley Long

- Theatrical release poster
- Directed by: Stanley Long
- Written by: Suzanne Mercer
- Story by: Stanley Long; Suzanne Mercer
- Produced by: Stanley Long; Executive; Barry Jacobs
- Production company: Salon Productions
- Release date: 6 May 1971
- Running time: 79 mins (original release); 68 mins (later release)
- Country: United Kingdom
- Language: English

Bread is a 1971 British film directed by Stanley Long, written by Long and Suzanne Mercer. The British Film Institute (BFI) called it "an unusual mixture of pop festival documentary and saucy teen comedy."

== Plot ==
Mick, Jeff, Trev, Cathy and Marty are a group of friends returning from the Isle of Wight Pop Festival. They decide to pitch their tent and squat in the grounds of a large country estate. The estate's owner, Rafe, who has recently inherited it, agrees that they may stay in exchange for them painting the house while he is away. The friends instead decide to organise their own pop festival

== Cast ==
- Crazy Mable (featuring the sounds and faces of)
- Juicy Lucy (featuring the sounds and faces of)
- Dick Haydon as Trev
- Nigel Anthony as Mick
- Peter Marinker as Jeff
- Mike Mcstay as Rafe
- Yocki Rhodes as Terry
- Liz White as Marty
- Noelle Rimmington as Cathy
- Richard Shaw as bookshop proprietor
- Sean Lynch as Dany
- Ben Howard as Gerry
- Andie Ross as secretary
- Derek Pollitt as customer
- Peter May as policeman
- Penny Brahms as Jan
- Robert Hartley as buyer
- Ann Murray as traffic warden
- Robert Hewison as TV interviewer
- Web as themselves

== Production ==
The film was financed by the backers of Groupie Girl (1970) and was based on the real life exploits of co-writer Suzanne Mercer. It opens with footage from the Isle of Wight Pop Festival.

Long called it "a terrible film in a way," saying the distributors were "really into sex films" and "didn't quite understand the pop culture" while "we were trying to make films that were more interesting" so "they got films made fairly seriously on the culture that existed at the time but they didn't get what they wanted. We were anti explicit nudity for the sake of it ... We got caught between two stools."

== Reception ==
=== Box office ===
The film took a long time to make a profit.

Long said when the distributors saw it they said "there's not enough tits in it."

=== Critical reception ===
Monthly Film Bulletin said "Pop counterpart of those flimsy Forties musicals extolling the initiative of some 'kids who wanted to put on a show'. Not only does Bread sanguinely assume that a young aristocrat would hand over his country estate to a bunch of hippies found squatting on his lawn, but also that these hippies could, in the space of a week, with neither capital nor contacts, stage a gigantic pop festival. Unfortunately, the film is also totally devoid of wit, charm, or invention, being largely made up of a series of formless sequences, woodenly scripted and acted, and unfailingly snail-paced. Even the musicians' performances seem uninspired, and the only item of any potential (a giggly attempt at making an amateur blue movie) is dissipated by weak direction. As a matter of interest, one scene (the breakdown of a jalopy in Piccadilly Circus and its apprehension by a real policeman) appears to be a replica of an incident in the 1965 film You Must Be Joking!"

According to the BFI, "Bread is too strange and erratic an amalgam of different film genres to really succeed. There's not enough sex to make it a sex film; not enough music to make it a music film; and none of the sleazy drama that would move it into Groupie Girl territory. What there is in abundance is mild, cheeky comedy."

The Lincolnshire Echo called it "a stupid time waster that does not score at any level."
