= Market in Honey Lane =

British TV series (1967–1969)

- Created by: Louis Marks
- Country of origin: United Kingdom
- No. of series: 1
- No. of episodes: 91 (13 missing)

Production
- Producer: John Cooper
- Running time: 30 minutes
- Production company: ATV

Original release
- Network: ITV
- Release: 3 April 1967 – 25 March 1969

Market in Honey Lane is an ATV British television weekly series, which switched to a twice weekly soap opera format (shown at varying times around the ITV regions) after the first year. It was broadcast between April 1967 and March 1969.

This cockney drama was set in an East London street market and covered the traders and customers. It was created by Louis Marks. According to www.lostshows.com, 13 of the original 91 episodes are missing from the archives.

== Cast ==
- Ivor Salter as Harry Jolson
- Ray Lonnen as Dave Sampson
- Brian Rawlinson as Danny Jessel
- Pat Nye as Polly Jessel
- John Bennett as Billy Bush
- Vicki Woolf as Vicky
- Michael Golden as Sam English
- Peter Birrel as Jacko Bennet
- John Barrett as Joey English
- Alister Williamson as Ron Tooke
- Gabriel Woolf as Gervaise
- Sheila Manahan as Sarah Blush
- Veronica Hurst as Carol Frazer
- Basil Henson as Seymour Darcy
- Michael Ripper as Tom Mount
- James Culliford as Alf Noble

Anna Wing also appeared. She would later find fame in the BBC soap EastEnders, which was also set in the East End of London. Market in Honey Lane was recorded at ATV Elstree, the same studio complex that is now home to EastEnders. Ray Lonnen would go on to star in another ATV soap, Crossroads, but in the Carlton Television produced Crossroads of 2001.
