= Three for All =

1975 British film by Martin Campbell

- Theatrical release poster
- Directed by: Martin Campbell
- Written by: Tudor Gates; Harold Shampan
- Produced by: Tudor Gates; Harold Shampan
- Starring: Adrienne Posta; Lesley North; Cheryl Hall; Graham Bonnet; Robert Lindsay
- Cinematography: Ian Wilson
- Edited by: Peter Musgrave
- Music by: Terry Trower
- Production company: Dejamus
- Distributed by: Fox-Rank
- Release date: May 1975 (UK)
- Running time: 90 minutes
- Country: United Kingdom
- Language: English

Three for All is a 1975 British musical comedy film directed by Martin Campbell and starring Adrienne Posta, Robert Lindsay, Paul Nicholas, Cheryl Hall, Richard Beckinsale, Graham Bonnet and John Le Mesurier. It was written by Tudor Gates and Harold Shampan.

== Plot ==
A British marketing executive books a British music group named Billy Beethoven for a tour through Spain to promote Spanish tourism but stipulates that the members of the group must adopt a cowboy image as a gimmick, and that their girlfriends will not be coming along because he needs the group to focus on performing.

The girlfriends pool their savings and buy their own tickets to Spain to follow their boyfriends. They ward off the advances of several men, most of them also British tourists, and ultimately catch up with their boyfriends at the end of the tour. However, the manager immediately books the band on another tour in the United States without their girlfriends.

== Cast ==
- Adrienne Posta as Diane
- Cheryl Hall as Pet
- Lesley North as Shelley
- Paul Nicholas as Gary
- Graham Bonnet as Kook
- Robert Lindsay as Tom
- Christopher Neil as Ricky
- Richard Beckinsale as Jet Bone
- George Baker as Eddie Boyes
- Simon Williams as Harry Bingley
- Diana Dors as Mrs Ball
- Arthur Mullard as Ben
- John Le Mesurier as Mr Gibbons
- Hattie Jacques as security official
- Roy Kinnear as Hounslow Joe
- Nicholas Young as Myron
- Liz Fraser as airport passenger
- David Kossoff as airport passenger
- Anna Quayle as La Pulle
- Ian Lavender as Carlo, Spanish policeman
- Dandy Nichols as Henrietta
- Edward Woodward as roadsweeper
- Sheila Bernette as Rhoda

== Production ==
The British group Showaddywaddy appear in the film performing "The Party" from their eponymous 1974 debut album.

== Critical reception ==
The Monthly Film Bulletin wrote: "A glance at the long list of guest stars confirms that Three for All was intended as a comedy. So much, unhappily, for intentions. The English abroad, especially the abroad of Costa Brava, and the machinations of PR men, are fair enough targets for comic treatment, but this dull and unimaginative enterprise manages to miss them unerringly with every well-worn gag – the cockney couple abroad who want steak and kidney or cod and chips with a cup of tea, the tourist's conviction that a few phrases make for fluency in a foreign language, the re-modelling of a pop group as glitter cowboys. The lack of comic invention is as much evident in the direction: Diane's rather sedate dance on the table scarcely warrants an arrest, and in a (mercifully) speeded-up sequence, the airport coach stops several times for little Danny's convenience. It is fortunate indeed that there are actors of the calibre of John Le Mesurier, Roy Kinnear et al on hand to inject some professional expertise into the tedium."
