= Adrienne Posta =

British actress

- Born: Adrienne Luanne Poster; Hampstead, London, England
- Occupations: Actress; singer
- Years active: 1957–present
- Spouses: Graham Bonnet (m. 1974, divorced) Stephen Davis (m. 1983)

Adrienne Posta (born Adrienne Luanne Poster) is a British actress and singer, prominent during the 1960s and 1970s. She adopted the surname Posta in 1966.

== Biography ==
Posta appeared in films such as To Sir with Love (1967) and Here We Go Round the Mulberry Bush, Up the Junction (both 1968), Spring and Port Wine (1970), Up Pompeii (1971) and Carry On Behind (1975). She also featured in a number of TV programmes, including the first episode of Budgie (1971), where she appeared as a stripper. She appeared throughout the BBC 1 series It's Lulu (1973), singing, dancing and acting alongside her friend Lulu and comedian Roger Kitter.

Posta also recorded a number of singles, including "The Winds that Blow" b/w "Backstreet Girl" on Decca Records, which was released in 1965. She has worked as a teacher in the Midlands and at the Italia Conti Academy of Theatre Arts. Posta is an honorary patron of the Music Hall Guild of Great Britain and America.

== Filmography ==
=== Film ===
- No Time for Tears (1957) – Cathy Harris
- To Sir, with Love (1967) – Moira Joseph
- Here We Go Round the Mulberry Bush (1968) – Linda
- Up the Junction (1968) – Rube
- Some Girls Do (1969) – Drummond's Daily
- All the Way Up (1970) – Daphne Dunmore
- Spring and Port Wine (1970) – Betty Duckworth
- Percy (1971) – Maggie Hyde
- Up Pompeii (1971) – Scrubba
- The Alf Garnett Saga (1972) – Rita
- Percy's Progress (1974) – PC 217
- Three for All (1975) – Diane
- Carry On Behind (1975) – Norma Baxter
- Adventures of a Taxi Driver (1976) – Carol
- Adventures of a Private Eye (1977) – Lisa Moroni

== Television ==
- Hancock (1963), 1 episode – Girl
- The Human Jungle – episode: "Conscience on a Rack" (1964) – Hazel Phillips
- Sergeant Cork (1964), episode: "The Case of the Pious Patriarch"
- The Master (1966)
- Journey to the Unknown (1968), episode: "Miss Belle"
- Don't Ask Us - We're New Here (1969)
- Dear Mother...Love Albert (1970) - Nurse Fleming - ('Hearts and Flowers' episode)
- Alexander the Greatest (1971)
- Budgie (1971), episode: "Out" – The Salford Stripper
- It's Lulu (1973)
- Till Death Us Do Part (1974), episode: "Party Night" – Millie
- Moody and Pegg (1974–1975) – Iris
- Edward the Seventh (1975) – Marie Lloyd
- Bar Mitzvah Boy (1976)
- Minder (1980) – Jenny
- In Loving Memory (1980), episode: "The Angels Want Me for a Sunbeam" – Sister Joanna
- The Olympian Way (1981) – Eva
- Red Dwarf (1997), episode "Ouroboros"
- The Wishing Chair (1998) – additional female characters
- 64 Zoo Lane (1999-2000), British animated television series – voiced several characters, including Doris the Duck, Molly the Hippo (Episode 3), Janet and Janice the Mother Kangaroos, Pauline the Pelican, Isabel the Flamingo, Melanie the Moose, Esmeralda the Snake, Petula the Parrot, Annabelle the Flamingo, Sharon the Puffin, Edna the Hyena and Various
- Preston Pig (2000) – Preston's Mom
- Angelina Ballerina (2001) – Grandma Mouseling

== Theatre ==
- Up in the Gallery, playing the lead role of Marie Lloyd alongside Jack Douglas and John Altman
- Babes in the Wood, playing Maid Marion alongside Edward Woodward at the London Palladium.
- Piaf, playing the role of Edith Piaf circa 1983
- SuperTed: A Musical for Children, playing the role of The Blue Fairy alongside Derek Griffiths, David Tate, Sheila Steafel, Victor Spinetti, Melvyn Hayes, Peter Blake and Roy Kinnear.

== Discography ==
Her first recordings were as Adrienne Poster.

- 7" single "Only Fifteen" / "There's Nothing You Can Do About That" – Decca F 11797 (1963)
- 7" single "Shang A Doo Lang" / "When A Girl Really Loves You" – Decca F 11864 (1964)
- 7" single "He Doesn't Love Me" / "The Way You Do the Things You Do" – Decca F 12079 (1965)
- 7" single "The Winds That Blow" / "Backstreet Girl" – Decca F 12181 (1965)
- 7" single "Something Beautiful" / "So Glad You're Mine" – Decca F 12329 (1966)

Subsequent recordings were as Adrienne Posta.

- 7" single "They Long To Be Close To You" / "How Can I Hurt You?" – Decca F 12455 (1966)
- 7" single "Dog Song" / "Express Yourself" – DJM DJS 286 (1973)
- 7" single "Cruisin' Casanova" / "Sing Me" – President PT 453 (1976)

She also recorded as part of Jonathan King's group the Piglets:

- 7" single "Johnny Reggae" / backing track – Bell Records (1971)
