= Double Bunk =

1961 British film by C. M. Pennington-Richards

- Directed by: C. M. Pennington-Richards
- Written by: C. M. Pennington-Richards
- Produced by: George H. Brown
- Starring: Ian Carmichael; Sid James; Janette Scott; Liz Fraser; Dennis Price
- Cinematography: Stephen Dade
- Edited by: John D. Guthridge
- Music by: Stanley Black
- Distributed by: Bryanston (UK)
- Release date: 29 March 1961 (London)
- Running time: 92 min
- Country: United Kingdom
- Language: English
- Budget: £110,275

Double Bunk is a 1961 British black-and-white comedy film written and directed by C.M. Pennington-Richards and starring Ian Carmichael. Janette Scott, Sid James and Liz Fraser.

== Plot ==
Facing eviction from their London flat, newlyweds Jack and Peggy are tricked into buying a rundown houseboat by owner Alfred Harper and his put-upon wife. Mr Watson, who owns Jack and Peggy’s mooring, soon introduces them to his mooring tariffs and associated surcharges.

Jack's used-car-salesman friend Sid helps him rebuild the engine, and the newlyweds take the boat down the River Thames to Ramsgate with Sid and his girlfriend Sandra as passengers. On the way they have trouble with an official from the Thames Conservancy and a member of the river police.

After Sandra's transistor radio gets misplaced next to the compass, they end up in Calais. With no fuel or supplies they must resort to desperate actions to get themselves and the houseboat back home. Sandra puts on a striptease for Watson, who also happens to be in Calais, so Jack and Sid can "borrow" some of Watson’s fuel and food. The next morning they follow Watson back across the English Channel, as their own compass is broken, and enter into a wager with Watson on who can get back to their mooring first. They win the bet when Watson's boat runs aground.

== Cast ==
- Ian Carmichael as Jack
- Janette Scott as Peggy
- Sid James as Sid
- Liz Fraser as Sandra
- Dennis Price as Watson
- Reginald Beckwith as Harper
- Irene Handl as Mrs. Harper
- Noel Purcell as O'Malley
- Naunton Wayne as 1st Thames conservancy officer
- Bill Shine as 2nd Thames conservancy officer
- Michael Shepley as Granville-Carter
- Toby Perkins as Pukka Type
- Miles Malleson as Rev. Thomas
- Jacques Cey as French official
- Hedger Wallace as 1st River Policeman
- Terry Scott as 2nd River Policeman
- Desmond Roberts as freighter captain
- Peter Swanwick as freighter pilot
- Gerald Campion as Charlie
- John Harvey as Johnnie
- Graham Stark as flower man
- Gladys Henson as Madame de Sola
- Willoughby Goddard as prospective purchaser
- Marianne Stone as prospective purchaser's wife
- Tom Gill as customs officer (uncredited)

== Production ==
The houseboat, Jasmine Cot, was actually Joan Mary, an Admiralty 48-foot "Personnel Launch, Diesel" conversion. She was based at Newmans Shipyard, 1, Strawberry Vale, Twickenham.

Tagg's Island, in the London Borough of Richmond upon Thames, was a filming location on 26 September 1960.

== Soundtrack ==
The musical score was composed by Stanley Black, and the title song (by Stanley Black, Jack Fishman and Michael (Mike) Pratt), sung by Sid James and Liz Fraser, was released as a single (Decca – 45-F 11328).

== Release ==
The film opened at the Leicester Square Theatre in London's West End on 29 March 1961 and went on general release in the UK on 8 May 1961.

The film went over budget by £4,500 and the producer had to write off personally £5,000.

== Critical reception ==
The Monthly Film Bulletin wrote: "Moments of inventiveness, such as Sidney James plotting a course with sugar tongs in place of dividers, are submerged in the copious slapstick, doubtful jokes and stale situations of conveyor-belt British farce. A familiar cast give all they can to stock character parts, with James making much of his sardonic lines, and the piece has pace and gaiety; but there is a limit to the number of times actors falling into rivers can draw a laugh."

The New York Times called it an "extremely anemic little British comedy."

The Spinning Image called it "a gently amusing feel-good comedy that chugs along nicely. ... You know you're in for a good time as soon as Double Bunk's opening credits kick in accompanied by a jaunty ditty sung by co-stars Sid James and Liz Fraser."

Britmovie wrote, "the supporting cast is a veritable treasure trove of familiar faces, including Sid James, Naunton Wayne, Liz Fraser, Irene Handl, Miles Malleson and Noel Purcell and Dennis Price."

The Radio Times Guide to Films gave the film 2/5 stars, writing: "There's more pleasure to be had from spotting the support cast than from following the stars in some vintage British movies, and this under-directed comedy about honeymooners racing their houseboat is no exception. The nominal lead is lan Carmichael, displaying his usual dottiness, but he had lost his ability to carry a picture by this point, and lovely though Janette Scott may be, she's no great shakes as an actress."

Leslie Halliwell said: "Thin comedy which turns out not to be leakproof."
