= Flanagan (model) =

British model and actress (born 1941)

Flanagan MBE
- Born: Maureen Flanagan; 1941 (age 84–85)
- Occupation: Model

Maureen Flanagan (born 1941), best known by her stage name, Flanagan, was an early tabloid model.

She was encouraged to take up a career in modelling by photographer Don McCullin, who took her first modelling shots. She had an acting career in the late 1960s and early 1970s, mainly in bit parts on The Benny Hill Show, Monty Python's Flying Circus, and several British sex comedies. She also played the lead role in the Danish film The Loves of Cynthia (a.k.a. Cynthia’s Sister) in 1971.

After her acting career ended, Flanagan remained in the public eye, owing to her association with the Kray Twins and her efforts to secure their release. Her involvement with the Kray family went back to her time as hairdresser for the twins' mother Violet. She also wrote the book Intimate Secrets of an Escort Girl (Everest books, 1974). The book was serialized in the magazine Tit-Bits, accompanied by a blurb which said “Britain’s most photographed model lays bare the facts of her working life in the sauciest story of the year.” Her memoir, One of the Family, was published in 2015.

In 1997, Flanagan made a one-off return to nude modeling as a mature woman, posing fully nude in the magazine Men's World. In the accompanying interview she said her second husband had recently died after a heart transplant operation, and that she was busy raising a 16-year-old son.

Maureen continues living in the heart of the East End, she is frequently interviewed for documentary's on London gangsters due to her association with The Kray twins. She is also the grandmother of five girls, one including the model and documentarian Madison Cox.

In December 2024, Maureen was joined by eldest granddaughter Scarlett and second eldest Madison at Buckingham Palace to accept her MBE for her outstanding charity work for her local council of Hackney.

== Acting roles ==
- Monty Python's Flying Circus (TV, 1969, 1970)
- Groupie Girl (1970)
- The Love Pill (1971)
- The Loves of Cynthia (1971)
- The Love Box (1972)
- Dracula AD 1972 (1972)
- The Benny Hill Show (TV, 1972)
- Zodiac (TV, 1974)
- On the Game (1974)

== Magazine covers ==
- King (1972) Issue 2
- Rex (1971) Vol.1 Issue. 29 “Sex and the Single Actress”
- Titbits (October 1974) Issue. 4625 "Flanagan's Secrets of an Escort Girl"
