= Andria Lawrence =

English actress and writer (1936–2025)

- Born: Maureen Smith; 20 June 1936; London, England
- Died: 17 November 2025 (aged 89)
- Other names: Andrea Lawrence
- Occupation: Actress
- Known for: On the Buses (1971); Countess Dracula (1971)
- Spouse: Heinz Dorler (1993–?)

Andria Lawrence (born Maureen Smith; 20 June 1936 – 17 November 2025) was an English actress and writer, best known for her roles in On the Buses, and in Coronation Street as Janet Stockwell.

== Life and career ==
Andria Lawrence is best remembered for her appearances in both the TV and film productions of the 1970s’ British sitcom On the Buses. Her performance as "Turnaround Betty" in the 1971 On the Buses film exemplified the amorous type of comic role in which she was most often cast. She was cast to similar comic type in For the Love of Ada (1972) and Man About the House (1974).

She is also remembered for her part as a pretty barmaid in a c.1970 TV advert for Courage Tavern Keg Bitter, in which her line was "Ooooh, it's too strong for me .... but I like the men who drink it!"

Lawrence demonstrated skill in drama too. She appeared in Ken Loach's acclaimed slice of gritty realism Cathy Come Home (1966) and in the Hammer Films production Countess Dracula (1971).

Lawrence was also a writer, publishing novel The Olive Tree in 2016. She died on 17 November 2025, at the age of 89.

== Filmography ==
Year	Title	Role	Notes
1960	In the Nick	Pub party guest, uncredited	Source: IMDb
1961	Dentist on the Job		Uncredited
1961	West End Jungle		
1962	The Plain Man's Guide to Advertising		Short, directed by Bob Godfrey
1971	Countess Dracula	Ziza	
1971	On the Buses	Betty	
1972	For the Love of Ada	Sandra	
1972	Danny Jones	Ice cream girl	
1973	Love Thy Neighbour	Norma	
1974	Frankenstein and the Monster from Hell	Brassy girl	
1974	Man About the House	Miss Bird	
1976	I'm Not Feeling Myself Tonight	Mrs Nutbrown	

== TV credits ==
Year	Title	Role
1960	An Arabian Knight (TV film)	Slave girl
1960	No Hiding Place (TV series); Episode: 'Three Small Bones'	Shirley
1961	No Hiding Place (TV series); Episode: 'A Girl Like Xanthe'	Caroline
1961	It's a Square World (TV series); Episodes: 2.2-2.6	Various
1962	The Avengers (TV series); Episode: 'The Removal Men'	Tourist
1963	Taxi! (TV series); Episode: 'The Outing'	Margot
1964	The Four Seasons of Rosie Carr (Mini-series); Episode: 'Autumn Near the Angel'	Cissie
1965	The Wednesday Play (Anthology series); Play: '3 Clear Sundays'	Gambler
1965	The Wednesday Play (Anthology series); Play: 'The Coming Out Party'	Sandra
1965	Londoners (TV series); Episode: 'The Frighteners'	Barmaid
1966	The Wednesday Play (Anthology series); Play: 'Cathy Come Home'	Inmate: at Home Lea
1967	The Wednesday Play (Anthology series); Play: 'An Officer of the Court'	Girl in club
1967	Softly, Softly (TV series); Episode: 'Appointment in Wyvern'	Miss Lloyd
1968	The Franchise Trail (TV film)	Waitress
1969	The First Churchills (Miniseries|Mini-series); Episode: 'Plot, Counter-Plot'	Nell Gwyn
1971	Doctor at Large (TV series); Episode: 'Pull the Other One!'	Nurse Doreen Willett
1971	On the Buses (TV series); Episode: 'Canteen Trouble' (5.7)	Suzy
1971	The Rivals of Sherlock Holmes (TV series); Episode: 'The Affair of the Tortoise'	Vera
1971	The Fenn Street Gang (TV series); Episodes: 'Distant Horizons'; 'Who Was That Lady?'	Sandra
1971	The Goodies (TV series); Episode: 'Farm Fresh Food'	
1971	The Leslie Crowther Show (TV series); Episode: 8 April 1971	Herself
1971	Coronation Street (TV series); Episode: May 1971	Applicant barmaid, Janet Stockwell
1973	Van der Valk (TV series); Episode: 'A Rose for Mr Reinhart'	Lottie
1973	Doctor in Charge (TV series); Episode: 'The Garden Fête'	Nurse Doreen Willett
1974	ITV Playhouse (Anthology series); Play: 'Love Affair'	Topsy
1975	The Virtuoso (TV film)	Mrs Flirt
1975	Dixon of Dock Green (TV series); Episode: 'Pot of Gold'	Barmaid
1981	The Jim Davidson Show (TV series); Episode: 3.2	
