= Hunter Davies =

British author, journalist and broadcaster (born 1936)

Hunter Davies OBE
- Born: Edward Hunter Davies; 7 January 1936 (age 90); Johnstone, Renfrewshire, Scotland
- Education: University College, Durham
- Occupations: Author; journalist; broadcaster
- Spouse: Margaret Forster (m. 1960; died 2016)
- Writing career
- Years active: 1965–present
- Notable work: The Beatles: The Authorised Biography

Edward Hunter Davies (born 7 January 1936) is a British author, journalist and broadcaster. His books include the only authorised biography of the Beatles.

== Early life ==
Davies was born in Johnstone, Renfrewshire, to Scottish parents. For four years his family lived in Dumfries until Davies was aged 11. He has quoted his boyhood hero as being football centre-forward, Billy Houliston, of Davies' then local team, Queen of the South.

His family moved to Carlisle in northern England when Davies was 11 and he attended the Creighton School in the city. Davies lived in Carlisle until he moved to study at university. During this time his father, who was a former Royal Air Force pay clerk, developed multiple sclerosis and had to retire on medical grounds from a civil service career.

Davies joined the sixth form at Carlisle Grammar School and was awarded a place at University College, Durham, to read for an honours degree in History, but after his first year he switched to a general arts course. He gained his first writing experience as a student, contributing to the university newspaper, Palatinate, where one of his fellow student journalists was the future fashion writer Colin McDowell. After completing his degree course he stayed on at Durham for another year to gain a teaching diploma and avoid National Service.

== Writing career ==
After he left university, Davies worked as a journalist, and in 1965 he wrote the novel Here We Go Round the Mulberry Bush, which was made into a film of the same name in 1967. He raised the idea of a biography of the Beatles with Paul McCartney when he met him to discuss the possibility of providing the theme song for the film. McCartney liked the idea of the book because inaccurate information had been published about the group but he advised him to obtain the approval of Brian Epstein. Epstein agreed to the proposal and the resulting authorised biography, The Beatles, was published in 1968. John Lennon mentioned in his 1970 Rolling Stone interview that he considered the book "bullshit", though Lennon at the time was vigorously debunking the Beatles' myth and anyone who had helped to create it.

In 1972, Davies wrote a book about football, The Glory Game, a behind-the-scenes portrait of Tottenham Hotspur. Davies also wrote a column for Punch about his daily life, called "Father's Day", presenting himself as a harried paterfamilias. In 1974, he was sent by The Sunday Times to look at a comprehensive school in action. He wrote three articles and then stayed on at the school – Creighton School in Muswell Hill, north London, now part of Fortismere School – to watch and study through a year in its life. The result was a book, the Creighton Report, published in 1976.

He has also written a biography of the fell walker Alfred Wainwright, and many works about the topography and history of the Lake District.

In children's literature, Davies has written the Ossie, Flossie Teacake and Snotty Bumstead series of novels.

As a ghostwriter, he has worked on the autobiographies of footballers Wayne Rooney, Paul Gascoigne and Dwight Yorke. The Rooney biography led to a successful libel action in 2008 by David Moyes, the manager of his former club, Everton. Davies has also ghostwritten politician John Prescott's 2008 autobiography, Prezza, My Story: Pulling no Punches.

Davies writes a football column for the New Statesman. A compilation of these articles was released as a book, The Fan, in 2005 by Pomona Press. Davies writes "Confessions of a Collector" in The Guardian's Weekend colour magazine. He has written a book about his collections with the same title.

During the Beatles sessions for the Let It Be album, the Beatles recorded a song called "There You Go Eddie" about Hunter Davies that appears on bootlegs. It was not officially released.

Davies was appointed Officer of the Order of the British Empire (OBE) in the 2014 Birthday Honours for services to literature.

== Personal life ==
Davies was married to the writer Margaret Forster from 1960 until her death in 2016. Their daughter Caitlin Davies is also an author. From 1963, the family lived in the north London district of Dartmouth Park.

During the summer months they lived in their second home near Loweswater in the Lake District. It was sold in July 2016. His autobiography The Beatles, Football and Me was published in 2007.

A fan of association football, Davies has stated that the first football team he supported was Queen of the South, when he lived in Dumfries. After moving to Carlisle aged 11, he adopted English Football League club Carlisle United.

A long-term resident of London, Davies' third adopted team is Tottenham Hotspur. In international football, Davies supports Scotland.

== Selected works ==
=== Novels ===
- Here We Go Round the Mulberry Bush (1965)
- Rise and Fall of Jake Sullivan (1970)
- A Very Loving Couple (1971)
- Body Charge (1972)

=== Non-Fiction ===
- The Beatles: The Authorised Biography (1968)
- The Other Half: Ten Case Histories of the new Poor Rich (1968)
- The Glory Game (1972)
- A Walk Along the Wall (1976)
- The Creighton Report: A Year in the Life of a Comprehensive School (1976)
- The Beatles, Revised Edition (1978)
- George Stephenson: The Remarkable Life of the Founder of the Railways (1980)
- The Joy of Stamps (1983)
- A Walk Round London's Parks (1983)
- The Beatles, 2nd Revised Edition (1986)
- The Teller of Tales: In Search of Robert Louis Stevenson (1994)
- Wainwright: The Biography (1995)
- West Cumbrian Views (1998)
- London to Loweswater: A Journey through England at the end of the Twentieth Century (1999)
- The Quarrymen (2001)
- Boots, Balls and Haircuts (2003)
- I Love Football (2006)
- The Second Half (2006)
- The Beatles, Football and Me (2007)
- The Bumper Book of Football (2007)
- Confessions of a Collector (2009)
- Postcards from the Edge of Football A Social History of a British Game (2010)
- The Beatles Lyrics (2014)
- The Biscuit Girls (2014)
- The Co-Op's Got Bananas: A Memoir of Growing Up in the Post-War North (2016)
- Bosnia and Herzegovina Travel Guide (2016)
- A Life in the Day (2017)
- The Beatles: The Authorised Biography 50th Anniversary Edition (2018)
- Happy Old Me: How to Live A Long Life, and Really Enjoy It (2019)
- The Heath: My Year on Hampstead Heath (2021)
- Love in Old Age: My Year in the Wight House (2023)
- Letters to Margaret: Confessions to my late wife (2024)
