= Anna Quayle =

English actress (1932–2019)

- Born: Anne Veronica Maria Quayle; 6 October 1932; Birmingham, England
- Died: 16 August 2019 (aged 86); London, England
- Education: Royal Academy of Dramatic Art
- Occupations: Actress; singer; dancer
- Years active: 1956–1999
- Spouse: Donald Baker (m. 1976) (divorced)
- Children: 1

Anne Veronica Maria Quayle (6 October 1932 – 16 August 2019), known professionally as Anna Quayle, was an English actress. In 1963, she received a Tony Award for Best Featured Actress in a Musical for her performance in the original production of Stop the World – I Want to Get Off (1961).

== Early and personal life ==
Quayle, whose father was the actor Douglas Quayle, studied at the Royal Academy of Dramatic Art (RADA). She debuted in East Lynne at age three and played other children's roles thereafter. She also worked as a model in her youth. During one modelling assignment she fell off a ladder, breaking her nose in three places. At her father's encouragement, she did not have it straightened.

In 1976, she married Donald Baker, but the marriage ended in divorce. She was the sister of actor John Quayle.

== Career ==
Quayle appeared on film, on stage and on television. After her graduation from RADA, she appeared at the Edinburgh Festival Fringe in Better Late (1956). Her film appearances include A Hard Day's Night (1964, in a short, but memorable scene with John Lennon), Smashing Time (1967), the German expressionist sequence of Casino Royale (1967), and Chitty Chitty Bang Bang (1968).

Quayle appeared on Broadway in 1963 in the original production of Stop the World – I Want to Get Off opposite Anthony Newley, for which she won a Tony Award for Best Supporting Musical Actress. She also appeared in productions of that musical in London and South Africa.

Her other television work includes the comedy drama series Mapp and Lucia, the children's science fiction series The Georgian House, and Grange Hill where she played the role of Mrs Monroe between 1990 and 1994. She also appeared as a regular panellist on the popular BBC2 panel game show What's My Line? in 1973.

== Death ==
In 2012, Quayle was diagnosed with Lewy body dementia; she died on 16 August 2019 at the age of 86.

== Selected filmography ==
=== Television ===
Year	Title	Role	Notes
1965	Not Only... But Also		1 episode
1965	Knock on Any Door	Ursula	Episode: "The Guests of Honor"
1967	The Avengers	Olga Vilovski	Episode: "The Correct Way to Kill"
1969	ITV Playhouse	Doreen	Episode: "The Beauty Operators"
1975	Jackanory Playhouse	Queen Henrietta	Episode: "The Queen and the Robot"
1976	The Georgian House	Miss Humphreys	3 episodes
1977	The Basil Brush Show		Episode: "Basil Through the Looking Glass"
1979	S.O.S. Titanic	Maude Slocombe	TV film
1979	BBC Television Shakespeare	Alice	Episode: The Life of Henry the Fift
1981	Brideshead Revisited	Nancy Tallboys	Episode: "The Unseen Hook"
1982	Never the Twain	Isadora Beecham	Episode: "As Young as You Feel"
1985	Marjorie and Men	Davina Moorhouse	Episode: "Poor Little Buttercup"
1986	Lytton's Diary	Bertha	Episode: "The Ends and the Means"
1986	Mapp & Lucia	Olga Braceley	Episode: "Au Reservoir"
1987	The Sooty Show	Guest Diner	Episode: "Restaurant"
1990-1994	Grange Hill	Mrs. Monroe	85 episodes
1999	Adam's Family Tree	Celia Spookfinder	Episode: "A Cavalier Spirit"

=== Film ===
Year	Title	Role	Notes
1964	A Hard Day's Night	Millie	
1966	The Sandwich Man	Second Billingsgate Lady	
1966	Drop Dead Darling	Aunt Miriam	
1967	Casino Royale	Frau Hoffner	
1967	Smashing Time	Charlotte Brillig	
1968	Chitty Chitty Bang Bang	Baroness Bomburst	
1971	Up the Chastity Belt	Lady Ashfodel	
1974	Mistress Pamela	Mrs. Jelks	
1975	Eskimo Nell	Reverend Mother	
1975	Three for All	La Pulle	
1976	The Seven-Per-Cent Solution	Freda	
1977	Adventures of a Private Eye	Medea	
1978	Adventures of a Plumber's Mate	Loretta Proudfoot	
