= Adventures of a Private Eye =

1977 British film by Stanley Long

- Theatrical release poster
- Directed by: Stanley Long
- Written by: Stanley Long; Michael Armstrong
- Produced by: Stanley Long; Peter Long; Michael Armstrong
- Starring: Christopher Neil; Suzy Kendall; Harry H. Corbett; Diana Dors
- Cinematography: Peter Sinclair
- Edited by: Joe Gannon
- Music by: De Wolfe
- Distributed by: Salon Productions
- Release date: March 1977
- Running time: 96 minutes
- Country: United Kingdom
- Language: English

Adventures of a Private Eye is a 1977 British sex comedy film directed by Stanley Long and starring Christopher Neil, Suzy Kendall, Harry H. Corbett and Liz Fraser. It was written by Long and Michael Armstrong. In the series, it followed Adventures of a Taxi Driver (1976) and preceded Adventures of a Plumber's Mate (1978).

== Plot ==
When private eye Judd Blake goes away he leaves his novice assistant Bob West to look after the business. Suspecting beautiful client Laura Sutton is being blackmailed, Bob goes after the villain – with hilarious results.

== Cast ==
- Christopher Neil as Bob West
- Suzy Kendall as Laura Sutton
- Harry H. Corbett as Sydney
- Diana Dors as Mrs. Horne
- Liz Fraser as Violet
- Adrienne Posta as Lisa Moroni
- Jon Pertwee as Judd Blake
- Irene Handl as Miss Friggin
- Anna Quayle as Medea
- Ian Lavender as Derek
- Willie Rushton as Wilfred
- Fred Emney as Sir Basil
- Julian Orchard as police cyclist
- Robin Stewart as Scott
- Veronica Doran as Maud
- Angela Scoular as Jane Hogg
- Jonathan Adams as Inspector Hogg
- Richard Caldicot as Craddock
- Hilary Pritchard as Sally
- Nicholas Young as Legs Luigi
- Linda Regan as Clarissa
- Leon Greene as Rosco
- Shaw Taylor as himself

== Critical reception ==
Monthly Film Bulletin said " 'I've seen all the sex films, you know', says the suburban housewife who abandons her apron for black leather and subsequently quotes titles both real and spurious – Last Tango in Paris, Deep Throat, Nuns in Rubber. Had she been watching British films, however, she would doubtless still be properly dressed, for film-makers here prefer to avoid all direct contact with explicit sex. Adventures of a Private Eye is highly symptomatic: we see nothing of the heroine's compromising photographs, though the director grants us unrevealing glimpses of the British Rail station at West Byfleet and ITV's crime hound Shaw Taylor. Instead, the audience is titillated by unimaginative lashings of 'saucy' humour, delivered by a well-tried cast. It must be said, however, that this specimen is slightly above par for the genre. Newcomer Christopher Neil is lively and natural, while the script's incoherent lurchings and botched attempts at parody at least provide a kind of entertainment."

Marjorie Bilbow wrote in Screen International: "All very bright and breezy, with enough attractive nudes to keep Dad happy without making Mum feel challenged by the nubile perfections of adolescence. The sex comedy element keeps safely within the British boundaries of the all-talk womaniser who is the seduced rather than the seducer. The comedy crime is enlivened with dialogue ranging from the mildly amusing to the very funny sketches that introduce Irene Handl and Fred Emney – both of whom know how to milk the most out of every word – and Adrienne Posta's nice send-up of Liza Minnelli. The plot, for all its incoherence and zig-zagging to get in all the familiar faces, has more rhyme and reason than most sex comedies but winds down to a weak ending and a limply desperate postscript. Good fun, but only the nudes and the heaving buttocks which so discreetly suggest copulation date the film as a product of today. We even meet our oldest friend the plain girl who becomes attractive when she takes her specs off."

The Radio Times Guide to Films gave the film 1/5 stars, writing: "Following on from the surprisingly profitable Adventures of a Taxi Driver, this smutty romp sticks to the same formula. Christopher Neil, in the title role, strips at regular intervals to satisfy a blackmailer's demand that he sleep with every pretty girl he meets. Comic stalwarts aside, this is really no more than soft-core pulp."
