= Alive and Kicking (1959 film) =

1959 British film by Cyril Frankel

- Directed by: Cyril Frankel
- Written by: Denis Cannan; William Dinnie; William Murum
- Produced by: Victor Skutezky
- Starring: Sybil Thorndike; Kathleen Harrison; Estelle Winwood; Stanley Holloway
- Cinematography: Gilbert Taylor
- Edited by: Bernard Gribble
- Music by: Philip Green
- Production company: Diador
- Distributed by: Warner-Pathé Distributors (UK); Seven Arts (US)
- Release dates: 1959 (UK); 1964 (US)
- Running time: 94 minutes
- Country: United Kingdom
- Language: English

Alive and Kicking is a 1959 British comedy film directed by Cyril Frankel and starring Sybil Thorndike, Kathleen Harrison, Estelle Winwood and Stanley Holloway, with Richard Harris making his film debut. Three women run away from a retirement home in order to avoid being separated. They eventually end up running a successful cottage industry sweater business on a remote island offshore of Ireland (although the film was shot in Scotland).

In 1964, the film was released in the US, with the film trailer establishing a tie-in to Stanley Holloway's success in My Fair Lady.

== Plot ==
Mrs Wilmot, Miss Baker and Miss Fife run away from the Sunset Home when they are notified that they will be split up, with two of them being sent off to different cities. They hide on a motorboat when they spot some policemen, but accidentally start the engine and reach the open sea before they run out of petrol. They are picked up by a Russian freighter, though none of the crew speak English. Not wanting to return with them to Murmansk, the ladies insist on being put ashore at the earliest opportunity. They end up on an Irish island, Inishfada.

They find three run-down, seemingly abandoned cottages, but are soon disappointed when MacDonagh arrives and informs them that he has purchased them for his retirement. He mentions his heart trouble. A few minutes later, he succumbs and falls off a cliff into the sea. Dora suggests they claim to be his nieces, and Rosie and Mabel agree. They are delighted when MacDonagh's new furniture is delivered.

However, a joke MacDonagh had made to some local children make the residents believe he is married to all three women, and an outraged mob set out to drive away the immoral interlopers. When Dora Wilmot asks if they have come to see her "uncle", the situation is defused. The women invite the now-friendly locals in for some tea. A party breaks out, aided by two cases of MacDonogh's 12-year-old whiskey.

The women notice a finely knitted sweater worn by one of the men at the party. The next day, Dora purchases one and sends it her cousin, who has a dress shop in London. This results in an order for 300 more for £5 each. Dora organises matters, offering the local women £4 10s for each sweater, keeping the remaining 10 shillings for herself and her friends.

Then MacDonagh's solicitor arrives and demands to see his client. When they refuse to produce him, the solicitor goes for a policeman. Fortunately, MacDonagh is not dead; he was merely stranded on another, uninhabited island. He is found and brought back just in time. MacDonagh learns about his "nieces" and plays along when the policeman shows up. MacDonagh, it turns out, is from the island and returned home after many years to help his people. He is pleased to discover that the ladies have done that for him.

== Cast ==
- Sybil Thorndike as Dora
- Kathleen Harrison as Rosie
- Estelle Winwood as Mabel
- Stanley Holloway as MacDonagh
- Liam Redmond as old man
- Marjorie Rhodes as old woman
- Richard Harris as lover
- Olive McFarland as lover
- John Salew as solicitor
- Eric Pohlmann as Soviet captain
- Colin Gordon as bird watcher
- Joyce Carey as matron
- Anita Sharp-Bolster as postmistress (as Anita Sharp Bolster)
- Paul Farrell as postman
- Patrick McAlinney as policeman
- Raymond Manthorpe as little boy
- Tony Quinn as villager
- Harry Hutchinson as villager
- Brendan O'Dowda as singer
- Joseph McNally as singer
- Liz Fraser as June (uncredited)
- Totti Truman Taylor as Royal Personage (uncredited)

== Soundtrack ==
- "Alive and Kicking", music by Philip Green, lyrics by Michael Carr
- "Liscannon Bay", music by Philip Green, lyrics by Michael Carr
- "Sobre las Olas" (uncredited), music by Juventino Rosas, arranged by Philip Green
- "The Chop Waltz" (1877) (uncredited), music by Euphemia Allen (using the pseudonym Arthur De Lulli)
- "One I Truly Love", music by Philip Green, lyrics by Michael Carr
- "What Shall We Do With A Drunken Sailor" (uncredited), traditional song sung by Sybil Thorndike, Estelle Winwood and Kathleen Harrison in the speedboat
- "The Farmer in the Dell" (uncredited), traditional song sung by the children

== Critical reception ==
Allmovie called it a "charming comedy."

TV Guide rated the film 3/5 stars, writing "this delightfully zany British comedy gets added spark from the three main actresses and the ever-precocious Holloway."

Radio Times also gave the film 3/5 stars, calling the three actresses "a joy to behold", and concluding "director Cyril Frankel's engaging piece of Irish whimsy is slight but diverting."
