= Leon Greene =

English actor and opera singer (1931–2021)

- Born: Lenard George Green; 15 July 1931; East Ham, Essex, England (present-day London, England)
- Died: 19 June 2021 (aged 89); United Kingdom
- Occupations: Singer (bass); actor
- Years active: 1965–2001

Lenard George Green (15 July 1931 – 19 June 2021), better known as Leon Greene, was an English bass and actor. He was known for his work with the D'Oyly Carte Company and the Sadler's Wells Opera, as well as starring roles in several West End musicals. He played Miles Gloriosus in the original London production of A Funny Thing Happened on the Way to the Forum, which he reprised for the 1966 film version. He was also a cast member of three Carry On films, and for director Richard Lester.

== Early life ==
Born Lenard George Green in East Ham, Essex (now in London) in 1931, he was the son of Esther (née Ticquet) and Leonard Green, a crane driver at London docks. During World War II, the family moved to Southend-on-Sea, where he studied engineering at the town’s municipal college, singing in its operatic society.

While doing national service with the Royal Air Force in Hornchurch, he took singing lessons with the Royal Opera House’s chorus master. His break came when he landed the role of an opera singer in a 1952 touring production of Das Dreimäderlhaus.

== Singing career ==
At the age of 20, Greene joined the D'Oyly Carte Opera Company and sang bass with them for just over a year. After leaving the D'Oyly Carte, he appeared in bass roles for several productions between 1954 and 1963 with the Sadler's Wells Opera.

Among operatic roles were, at Sadler's Wells, one of the three Vagabonds in Die Kluge in 1959, roles in The Nightingale and Long Tom in Merrie England in 1960, Zuniga in Carmen in 1961, Private Willis in Iolanthe in 1962 (also recorded), Alaska Wolf Joe in The Rise and Fall of the City of Mahagonny in 1963, The Cook in Love for Three Oranges in 1963 (New Opera Company). He sang Lilaque le Fils in Boulevard Solitude in a New Opera Company production at Sadler's Wells in 1963.

In 1958 he was listed as the Publicity Manager of the London Opera Group, a professional touring opera company directed by Peter Glossop, also singing the title role in Don Pasquale.

=== Musical theatre ===
In 1963, he moved on to musical comedy, appearing in the West End production of A Funny Thing Happened on the Way to the Forum as the Roman captain Miles Gloriosus. He then reprised the role for the musical's 1966 film adaptation.

Greene's portrayal of Sweeney Todd in a Half Moon Theatre production in 1985 was described as "the best, grisliest version" in relation to later productions. He reprised Miles Gloriosus in A Funny Thing Happened on the Way to the Forum at Chichester Festival Theatre in the summer of 1986, and the Baron for Scottish Opera and in the award-winning production of Candide at the Old Vic in 1988–89.

Beginning in the 1990s, he worked in pantomime, and worked with Lionel Blair to help introduce the genre to Canada.

== Film and television ==
With his imposing frame and deep voice, Greene had a successful secondary career as a character actor. His films included A Funny Thing Happened on the Way to the Forum (1966), reprising Miles Gloriosus; Camelot (1967), A Challenge for Robin Hood (also 1967), The Devil Rides Out (1968), a rare starring role; The Squeeze (1977), Flash Gordon (1980), and several Carry On comedies. He was often cast by director Richard Lester, first in A Funny Thing Happened on the Way to the Forum. On television, he appeared in the 1967 The Avengers episode "The Superlative Seven" as Freddy Richards.

== Personal life ==
In 1953, Greene married Jean Percival, who was the long-time supervisor of the Royal Opera House’s headdress and jewellery department.

== Death ==
Greene died in June 2021, aged 89.

== Partial filmography ==
- How to Undress in Public Without Undue Embarrassment (1965)
- A Funny Thing Happened on the Way to the Forum (1966) - Captain Miles Gloriosus
- Don't Lose Your Head (1966) - Malabonce
- Camelot (1967) - Sir Turloc (uncredited)
- A Challenge for Robin Hood (1967) - Little John
- The Devil Rides Out (1968) - Rex Van Ryn
- Assignment to Kill (1968) - The Big Man
- Carry On Henry (1971) - Torturer
- Carry On at Your Convenience (1971) - Chef
- The Persuaders (1971) - Abel Gaunt
- 11 Harrowhouse (1974) - Max Toland, Jewel Thief
- The Four Musketeers (1974) - Swiss Officer
- Royal Flash (1975) - Grundwig
- The Ritz (1976) - Muscle Bound Patron
- The Seven-Per-Cent Solution (1976) - Squire Holmes
- Adventures of a Private Eye (1977) - Rosco
- The Squeeze (1977) - Commissionaire
- Adventures of a Plumber's Mate (1978) - Biggs
- The Thief of Baghdad (1978) - Jaudur's Guard
- The Human Factor (1979) - Tall Man
- Flash Gordon (1980) - Colonel of Battle Control Room
- Masada (1981, TV Mini-Series) - 1st Centurion
- The Return of the Musketeers (1989) - Captain Groslow
