= Willie Rushton =

English cartoonist and comedian (1937–1996)

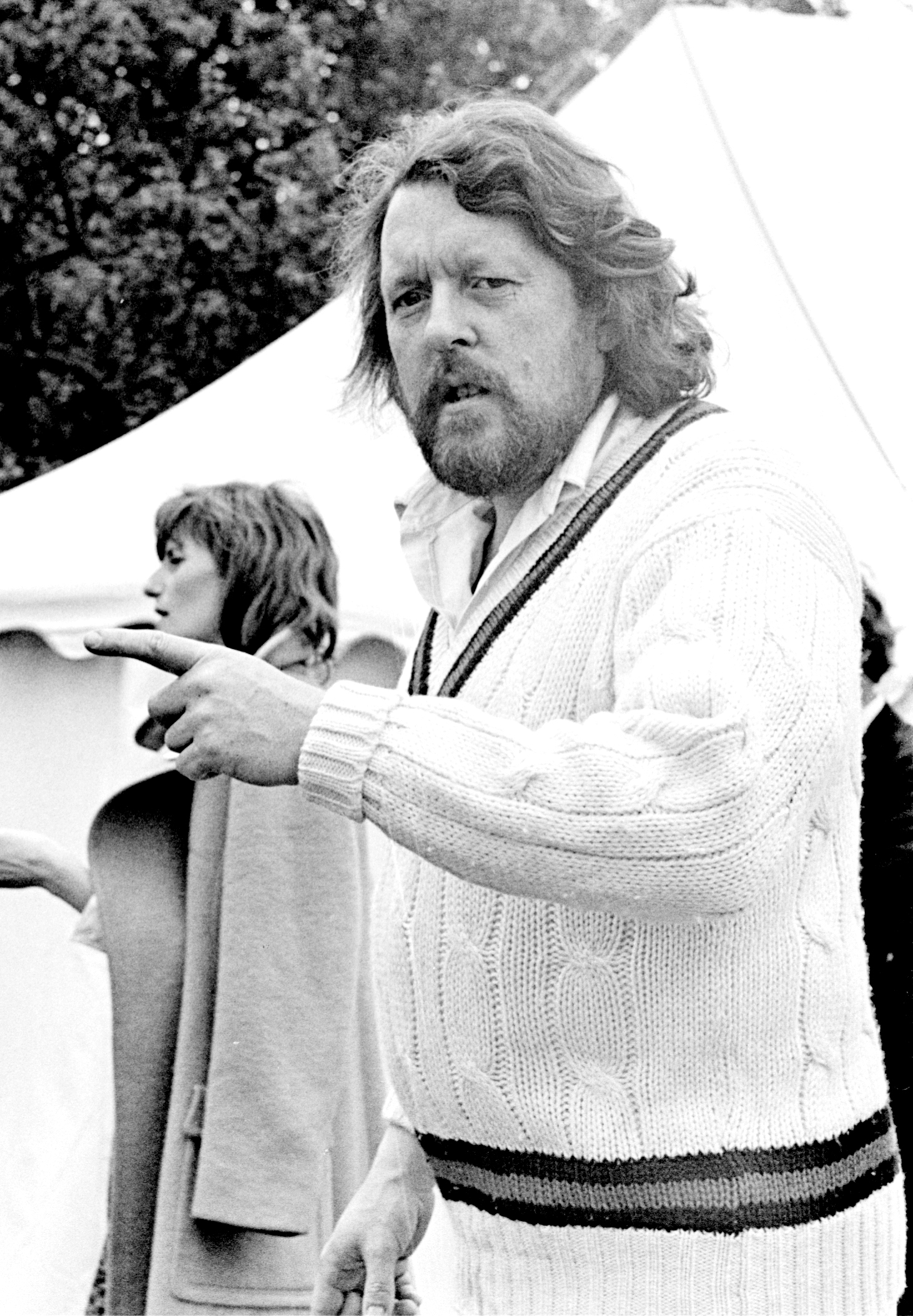
- Rushton in 1976
- Born: William George Rushton; 18 August 1937; Chelsea, London, England
- Died: 11 December 1996 (aged 59); Kensington, London, England
- Occupations: Cartoonist; comedian; actor; satirist; writer
- Years active: 1961–1996
- Spouse: Arlene Dorgan (m. 1968)

William George Rushton (18 August 1937 – 11 December 1996) was an English cartoonist, comedian, actor and satirist who co-founded the satirical magazine Private Eye.

== Early life ==
Rushton was born 18 August 1937 at 3 Wilbraham Place, Chelsea, London, the only child of publisher John Atherton Rushton (1908–1958) and his Welsh wife Veronica (née James, 1910–1977). He was educated at Shrewsbury School, where he was not particularly successful academically but met his future Private Eye colleagues Richard Ingrams, Paul Foot and Christopher Booker. He also contributed to the satirical magazine The Wallopian (a play on the school magazine name The Salopian), mocking school spirit, traditions and the masters. Later, he said he recalled little of his schooldays, except that "it was Blandings country. The sort of place where you go to die, not to be educated."

After school, Rushton had to undertake two years of national service in the Army, where he failed officer selection. He later commented, "The Army is, God bless it, one of the funniest institutions on earth and also a sort of microcosm of the world. It's split almost perfectly into our class system. Through serving in the ranks I discovered the basic wit of my fellow man – whom basically, to tell the truth, I'd never met before." On leaving the army, he worked in a solicitor's office for a short period.

== Private Eye and the satire boom ==
Rushton remained in contact with his friends from Shrewsbury School, who had added John Wells to their number and were now running their own humour magazines at Oxford University, Parsons Pleasure and Mesopotamia, to which Rushton made many contributions during his frequent visits to meet them. A cartoon of a giraffe in a bar saying "The high balls are on me" was not met with approval by everyone in the university administrative quarters. Rushton suggested that Mesopotamia could continue after they left university. During his time as a clerk he had been sending his cartoons out to Punch but none had been accepted. After being knocked over by a bus, he gave up his job as a clerk, determined not to waste another day.

After almost but not quite being accepted by Tribune (a Labour-supporting newspaper edited by Michael Foot, Paul Foot's uncle), Rushton found a place at the Liberal News, which was also employing Christopher Booker as a journalist. From June 1960 until March 1961, he contributed a weekly strip, "Brimstone Belcher", following the exploits of the titular journalist (a forerunner of Private Eye's Lunchtime O'Booze), from bizarre skulduggery in the British colonies (where the soldiers holding back the politicised rabble bear a strong resemblance to privates Rushton and Ingrams), travelogues through the US, and the hazards of by-electioneering as the independent candidate for the constituency of Gumboot North. After the strip folded, Rushton still contributed a weekly political cartoon to the Liberal News until mid-1962.

The Salopians finally found a financier for their magazine and the first issue of Private Eye was published on 25 October 1961. Rushton created the magazine in his bedroom in Scarsdale Villas using Letraset and cow-gumming illustrations onto cards which were taken away to be photo-lithographed. He also contributed all the illustrations and the mast-head figure of Little Gnitty (who still appears on the cover, a blended caricature of John Wells and the Daily Express standard-head). One critic described the original lay-out of the magazine as owing much to "Neo-Brechtian Nihilism", although Rushton thought it resembled a betting shop floor. One feature in the early issues was the "Aesop Revisited", a full-page comic strip which let him work in a wealth of puns and background jokes.

With Private Eye riding the satire boom, Peter Cook soon took an interest and contributed two serials recounting the bizarre adventures of Sir Basil Nardly-Stoads and the Rhandi Phurr, both of which were illustrated by Rushton, as was "Mrs Wilson's Diary". In the early days the team also worked on two books, Private Eye on London and Private Eye's Romantic England that made heavy use of Rushton's cartooning talents. One of the first Private Eye-published books was Rushton's first collection of cartoons, Willie Rushton's Dirty Weekend Book, which was subsequently banned in Ireland on the grounds of its explicitness.

Reuniting with his Salopian friends had also reawakened Rushton's taste for acting. After they had finished university, he had accompanied his friends in a well-received revue at the Edinburgh Festival Fringe. (Richard Burton even appeared one night in their parody of John Osborne's play Luther.) In 1961, Richard Ingrams directed a production of Spike Milligan's surreal post-nuclear apocalypse farce The Bed-Sitting Room, in which Rushton was hailed by Kenneth Tynan as "brilliant", but it was a cabaret at the Room at the Top, a chicken-in-a-basket nightclub at the top of a department store in Ilford, that really launched his career. Rushton recalled meeting the Kray twins in the audience one night and that fellow performer Barbara Windsor "wouldn't come out for a drink that night". The revue also starred John Wells.

Rushton's impersonation of Prime Minister Harold Macmillan caught the attention of Ned Sherrin, a young BBC producer searching for talent to appear in a forthcoming TV satire series. That Was the Week That Was (aka "TW3") ran from November 1962 until December 1963. It drew audiences of up to 13 million, making stars of its cast, particularly David Frost. Rushton became known for his impersonation of the Prime Minister, a daring novelty in those respectful days. "It's the only impersonation that people have ever actually recognised – so I'm very grateful to the old bugger ... But then I had voted for him, so he owed me something." Rushton also appeared on the original flexi-discs of skits, squibs and invective that Private Eye gave away, having success with two self-penned songs: "Neasden" and the "Bum Song". He also wrote songs for TW3, many of which were revisited on later solo albums like Now in Bottles and The Complete Works.

In the autumn of 1963, a health scare led Macmillan to resign and Alec Douglas-Home became prime minister. It was necessary that Douglas-Home resign his peerage to find a safe Parliamentary seat. The Private Eye team were so disgusted by the Conservative Party's machinations that they decided to stand their own protest candidate in the Kinross and Western Perthshire by-election. Since he was the most well-known member of the team, Rushton was the obvious choice to stand. Rushton gained much attention from journalists, since he stood under the slogan "Death to the Tories". He polled only 45 votes, having advised his supporters at the last minute to vote Liberal, the Conservatives' only credible challenger. Douglas-Home won.

Rushton described his political beliefs as being "left of Limbo" stating that he had always voted for Labour because he felt their attitude to life was "more generous than anyone else's" but would happily take potshots at anyone who said something silly.

== Films, television and radio ==
When TW3 was cancelled in anticipation of the 1964 election, Rushton and some of the cast, as well as some of the members of the Cambridge University revue Cambridge Circus (including future Goodies Tim Brooke-Taylor and Bill Oddie), went on tour in America as David Frost Presents TW3. Rushton and Barry Fantoni (another Private Eye contributor) entered a painting titled Nude Reclining, a satirical portrait of three establishment types, for the 1963 Royal Academy Summer Exhibition under the name of Stuart Harris, which excited much controversy. He also began a career as a character actor for films in 1963. In late 1964 Rushton was involved as one of the hosts in the early episodes of another satirical programme, Not So Much a Programme, but drifted away as it became the vehicle that launched David Frost as a chat show host. In 1964 he appeared as Richard Burbage in Sherrin and Caryl Brahms' musical of No Bed for Bacon, while his early stature as a personality was confirmed by a cartoon advert he devised for the Brewers' Society proclaiming the charms of the local pub. Rushton performed his own host duties for New Stars and Garters, a variety entertainment show in 1965, where he first met Arlene Dorgan. He also appeared as a guest in programmes including Not Only... But Also with Peter Cook and Dudley Moore.

During the late 1960s, Rushton spent much of his time in Australia, following Dorgan back to her homeland. He married her in 1968. He had several series of his own on Australian television, Don't Adjust Your Set – The Programme is at Fault and From Rushton with Love. He said of Australia, "They've got their priorities right, they're dedicated to lying in the sun, knocking back ice-cold beer". During this period he modelled for She magazine and appeared in a 1967 stage production of Treasure Island as Squire Trelawney, alongside Spike Milligan and Barry Humphries, at the Mermaid Theatre in London. On one of his return visits to the UK in 1968 he brought back the late Tony Hancock's ashes to the UK in an Air France bag – "My session with the Customs was a Hancock's Half Hour in itself."

He appeared in cameo roles in films, including Those Magnificent Men in Their Flying Machines (1965), Monte Carlo or Bust (1969), The Best House in London (1969) and The Adventures of Barry McKenzie (1972). He played Tim Brooke-Taylor's gay husband in Sharon Tate's last film before her murder, The Thirteen Chairs (1969), and Tobias Cromwell in Flight of the Doves (1971), as well as appearing in sex comedies such as Keep It Up Downstairs (1976), Adventures of a Private Eye (1977) and Adventures of a Plumber's Mate (1978). His final film appearance was as Big Teddy in Consuming Passions released in 1988. As a TV actor in the 1970s he appeared in episodes of popular programmes as different as The Persuaders!, Colditz (episode: "The Guests" – Major Trumpington in a kilt) and Up Pompeii! as the narrator Plautus. He was Dr Watson to John Cleese's Sherlock Holmes in N. F. Simpson's surreal comedy Elementary, My Dear Watson. In 1975 and 1976 he appeared in well-received pantomimes of Gulliver's Travels; in 1981 in Eric Idle's Pass the Butler; and in 1988 as Peter Tinniswood's irascible Brigadier in Tales from a Long Room. Rushton also wrote two musicals:

- Liz of Lambeth in 1976.
- Tallulah Who? in 1991, with Suzi Quatro and Shirlie Roden.

In this period, he also found time to contribute seven humorous, spoken word pieces for the double LP, Tale of Ale.

His last major solo TV project was Rushton's Illustrated (1980; partially wiped by ATV which often did not keep programmes considered of no international sales value). By now he was an established guest on quiz shows and celebrity panel games: Celebrity Squares, Blankety Blank, Countdown and Through the Keyhole. When asked why he appeared on these "ludicrous programmes", his answer was simple: "Because I meet everybody there".

For 22 years until his death, he was a panellist in the long-running BBC Radio 4 panel comedy game show I'm Sorry I Haven't a Clue, which he joined as a regular team member in the third series in 1974. In its later years, the show's wealth of silliness, smut and punning was drawing audiences of up to a thousand people for its recordings. In 1990 he teamed up with his co-panellist Barry Cryer in their own show Two old Farts in the Night, performing to full audiences at the Edinburgh festival, the Royal Albert Hall and the Festival Hall, touring the country irregularly until Rushton's death.

He played a recurring character as a policeman in Southern Television's 1970–73 children's show Little Big Time with Freddie Garrity; his policeman's helmet bore a blue flashing light. His manner and voice meant Rushton was in constant demand for adverts, voice-overs and presenting jobs. In the mid-1970s, his reading of Winnie the Pooh for the BBC's Jackanory was particularly popular. He also provided all the voices for the claymation animated series The Trap Door in the late 1980s. He was a popular choice for narrating audio books, especially those for children. In particular he recorded 18 of the books by the Rev. W. Awdry for The Railway Stories series. He also recorded adaptations of Asterix books and Alice in Wonderland, and provided the voice of the King in the early animated Muzzy films. In the early 1980s he wrote and illustrated a series of children's books about "The Incredible Cottage", and provided illustrations for many children's books.

Rushton had not been involved in Private Eye since the latter part of the 1960s, other than a brief stint illustrating "Mrs Wilson's Diary" when the Labour Party came back into power in the mid-1970s. He returned to Private Eye in 1978 to take over the task of illustrating "Auberon Waugh's Diary", which continued until 1986. The cartoons perfectly complemented Auberon Waugh's scabrous and surreal flights of invective, and when Waugh moved his column to The Daily Telegraph as the "Way of the World" in 1990, Rushton followed, drawing at Waugh's instruction such surreal concepts as Richard Ingrams pretending to be a seven-year-old choirgirl, the head of a dead cow coming out of a computer connected to the then-new (in common usage) internet and a nude statue of Benjamin Britten with a bird bath discreetly covering its private parts.

The Victoria and Albert Museum, recognising his accomplishments, commissioned 24 large colour illustrations which were collected as Willie Rushton's Great Moments of History. (Rushton had previous experience with the V&A when he had pulled a prank on the institution by labelling an electric plug socket in one of the galleries: "Plug hole designed by Hans Plug (b. 1908)", which remained for a full year – to the great annoyance of a cleaner who had to use a hefty extension lead for 12 months so as not to damage the exhibit.) This large-scale excursion into the use of colour was good practice for the monthly colour covers he created for the Literary Review when Waugh became its editor in 1986. Rushton drew these covers along with the fortnightly caricatures for Private Eye's literary review page until he died.

Rushton had always been conscious of his weight, listing his recreations in Who's Who as "gaining weight, losing weight and parking", and in 1973 he had been the host of a slimming programme, Don't Just Sit There. His first major health scare had been the onset of diabetes (the cause of his father's death in 1958). Having to give up beer, Rushton became, according to Ingrams, "quite grumpy as a result, but his grumpiness had an admirable and jaunty quality to it." A sudden loss of three stone had prevented him from playing in Prince Rainier's XI at Monte Carlo, Monaco. Rushton was always passionate about cricket. His father had sent him for coaching at Lord's before he went to Shrewsbury. His cricket and general knowledge were called upon in his role as a regular team captain on BBC Radio 4's quiz show Trivia Test Match with Tim Rice and Brian Johnston, which ran from 1986 to 1993. Rushton was always an enthusiastic cricketer, playing in the Lord's Taverners, a charity celebrity cricket team.

In 1989 he performed in The Secret Policeman's Biggest Ball. His act consisted of singing "Top Hat, White Tie and Tails" and acting out the lyrics, which left him standing in a top hat, white tie, and tails – but no trousers. In July 1992 Rushton appeared as the King in a performance of Cole Porter's musical satire on the British monarchy Jubilee. He played Uncle Zed in EMI's 40th anniversary recording of Salad Days, conducted by John Owen Edwards, in 1994.

In his later years his cartoons were part of an exhibition at the National Portrait Gallery.

== Death and memorials ==
Willie Rushton's blue plaque

Rushton died of a heart attack at Cromwell Hospital, Kensington on 11 December 1996, aged 59. Ten years earlier, he had made a jocular prediction that he would die that year. In the first episode of Series 13 of I'm Sorry I Haven't a Clue, which aired on 26 July 1986, Chairman Humphrey Lyttelton asked the panellists to "gaze into their crystal balls" and make predictions for 1996. Rushton said, "I'm sorry you introduced this round, because I just spotted a memorial service for myself in Westminster Abbey in January". Among his last words was the advice, "Tell Bazza he's too old to do pantomime", meant for his long-time friend Barry Cryer.

Rushton is honoured by a Comic Heritage blue plaque at Mornington Crescent tube station, a reference to the game Mornington Crescent on I'm Sorry I Haven't A Clue. BBC Radio 7 showcased his contribution to I'm Sorry I Haven't a Clue, in the week of the 10th anniversary of his death, by rebroadcasting five episodes of the show, one on each weekday night (11–15 December 2006). The broadcasts chosen included the last shows he recorded for the programme. According to the autobiography of Nicholas Parsons, Rushton's ashes were buried by the boundary at The Oval cricket ground.

== Filmography ==
Year	Title	Role
1964	It's All Over Town	Fat Friend
1964	Nothing but the Best	Gerry
1965	Those Magnificent Men in Their Flying Machines	Tremayne Gascoyne
1968	The Mini-Affair	Chancellor of the Exchequer
1968	The Bliss of Mrs. Blossom	Dylan's assistant
1969	Monte Carlo or Bust	John O'Groats Official
1969	The Best House in London	Sylvester Wall
1969	The Thirteen Chairs	Lionel Bennet
1971	Flight of the Doves	Tobias Cromwell
1972	The Adventures of Barry McKenzie	Passenger on Plane
1976	Keep It Up Downstairs	Snotty Shuttleworth
1977	Adventures of a Private Eye	Wilfred
1978	Adventures of a Plumber's Mate	Dodger
1986, 1990	The Trap Door	Voices
1996	The Treacle People	Santa

== Bibliography ==
=== Novels ===
- The Day of the Grocer William Rushton (Andre Deutsch, 1971)
- W. G. Grace's Last Case William Rushton (Methuen, 1984)
- Spy Thatcher; The Collected Ravings of a Senior MI5 Officer William Rushton (Pavilion, 1987)

=== Solo works ===
- William Rushton's Dirty Book William Rushton (Private Eye Productions, 1964)
- The 'I Didn't Know The Way To Kings Cross When I First Came Here But Look at Me Now' Book By William Rushton, Author, Artist And Beer-Drinker Extraordinary William Rushton (New English Library, 1966)
- Sassenach's Scotland William Rushton (Seagram, 1975)
- Superpig: A Gentleman's Guide To Everyday Survival William Rushton (Macdonald And Janes, 1976)
- The Reluctant Euro – Rushton Versus Europe William Rushton (Queen Anne Press/Macdonald Futura 1980)
- The Filth Amendment William Rushton (Queen Anne Press, 1981)
- Think of England. An Identikit Preview of the New Heir to the Throne William Rushton (Penguin Books, 1982)
- The Naughty French Wine Book William Rushton (G & J Greenall, 1983?)
- Great Moments of History William Rushton (V & A, 1985)
- The Alternative Gardener A Compost of Quips for the Green-Fingered William Rushton (Grafton Books, 1986)
- Every Cat in the Book William Rushton (Pavilion Books, 1993)
- The Nine Lives of the Number Ten Cat William Rushton (Pavilion, 1995)
- Willie Rushton's Pack of Royals, 18 Caricature Playing Cards William Rushton (1995)

=== Private Eye books ===
- Private Eye on London By Private Eye Rushton with Christopher Booker and Richard Ingrams (Weidenfeld And Nicolson 1962)
- Private Eye's Romantic England And Other Unlikely Stories: A Miscellany – The Last Days of Macmilian Rushton with Christopher Booker and Richard Ingrams (Weidenfeld And Nicolson 1963)
- Mrs. Wilson's Diary Richard Ingrams and John Wells (Rushton illustrations only) (Private Eye, 1965)
- Mrs Wilson's 2nd Diary Richard Ingrams and John Wells (Rushton illustrations only) (Private Eye, 1966)
- True Stories Christopher Logue (Rushton illustrations only) (Four Square, 1965)
- The Penguin Private Eye Rushton with Christopher Booker and Richard Ingrams (Penguin, 1965)
- Mrs Wilson's Diaries (omnibus of first two books with a few additional drawings) Richard Ingrams and John Wells (Sphere, 1966)
- Mrs. Wilson's Diary Richard Ingrams and John Wells (Rushton illustrations only) (Andre Deutsch, 1975)
- Rushton in the Eye (a posthumous "Private Eye Special" magazine sampling Rushton's work)

=== With Auberon Waugh ===
- The Diaries of Auberon Waugh A Turbulent Decade (Rushton illustrations only) (Private Eye/Andre Deutsch, 1985)
- Waugh on Wine (Rushton illustrations only) (Fourth Estate, 1986)
- Way of the World (Rushton illustrations only) (Century, 1994)
- Way of the World: The Forgotten Years 1995–1996 (Rushton illustrations only) (Century, 1997)

=== With Dorgan Rushton ===
- Brush Up Your Pidgin (Willow Books, 1983)
- Collages (Pelham Books, 1984)
- The Ffrench Letters By Godwyn Ainsley Ffrench – A Young Englishman's Letters From Abroad Giving His Very Personal And Somewhat Peculiar View of Paris in the Year 1900 (Printfine, 1984.)
- Queen's English: High Taw Tawk Prawpah-leah (Pelham Books, 1985)

=== On sport ===
- How To Play Football William Rushton (Margaret & Jack Hobbs, 1968)
- Pigsticking – A Joy For Life William Rushton (Macdonald, 1978)
- Marylebone Versus The World William Rushton (Pavilion Books, 1987)
- The Thoughts of Trueman Now Fred Trueman, Eric Morecambe, and Fred Rumsey (Rushton illustrations only) (Macdonald & Janes, 1978)
- The Lord's Taverners Sticky Wicket Book with Tim Rice (eds.) (Queen Anne Press/Macdonald & Jane's: 1979)
- The Compleat Cricketer Jonathan Rice (Rushton illustrations only) (Blandford Press, 1985)
- Cricket Balls Rory Bremner (Rushton illustrations only) (Robson Books, 1994)

=== Children's books ===
- Ebbledum E. Elephant Iris Degg (Rushton illustrations only) (George G. Harrap, 1961.)
- Sunny Bell and The Shrimp Street Gang Iris Degg (Rushton illustrations only) (George G. Harrap, 1962)
- The Geranium of Flüt William Rushton (Andre Deutsch, 1975)
- Jubilee Jackanory (Rushton story with illustrations) (BBC, 1977)
- The Discontented Dervishes And Other Persian Tales From Sa'di Arthur Scholey (Rushton illustrations only) (Andre Deutsch, 1977)
- Elephant on the Line! Talbot Jon (Rushton illustrations only) (Kaye And Ward, 1979)
- Wild Wood Jan Needle (Rushton illustrations only) (Andre Deutsch, 1981)
- The Stupid Tiger And Other Tales Raychaudhuri, Upendrakishore (Translated By William Radice) (Rushton illustrations only) (Andre Deutsch, 1981)
- Ancient George Gets His Wish William Rushton (Golden Acorn Pub, 1981)
- The Story of the Incredible Cottage William Rushton (Golden Acorn Pub, 1981)
- The Incredible Cottage Goes to the Moon William Rushton (Golden Acorn, 1981)
- Waldo Meets The Witch William Rushton (Golden Acorn Pub, 1981)
- The Incredible Cottage Annual William Rushton (Grandreams Ltd, 1982)
- A Cat And Mouse Story. An Old Tale Michael Rosen (Rushton illustrations only) (Andre Deutsch, 1982)
- Losers Weepers Jan Needle (Rushton illustrations only) (Magnet Books, 1983)
- How To Keep Dinosaurs Robert Mash (Rushton illustrations only) (Penguin Books, 1983)
- The Surprising Adventures of Baron Munchausen Terence Blacker (Rushton illustrations only) (Hodder Stoughton, 1989)

=== Books illustrated by Rushton ===
- The Stag Cook Book: Being a Low Guide to the High Art of Nosh Peter Evans (Four Square, 1967)
- This England – Selection of Pieces from the New Statesman Michael Bateman (ed). (Penguin, 1969)
- Comic Cuts: A Bedside Sampler of Censorship in Action Richard Findlater (ed) (Andre Deutsch, 1970)
- Practical Decorating for Practically Everyone (essay and illustrations by Rushton) (Polycell, 1976, 1977?)
- Duckworth Vedah Hamon Moody (World's Work. 1977)
- Unarmed Gardening Frank Ward (Macdonald & Janes, 1979)
- I'm Sorry I Haven't A Clue with Tim Brooke-Taylor, Barry Cryer, Graeme Garden, and Humphrey Lyttelton (Robson Books, London, 1980)
- The First Impossible Quiz Book Ian Messiter (Star, 1980)
- Bureaucrats. How To Annoy Them! R.T. Fishall (Sidgwick & Jackson. 1981)
- Health for Hooligans Sandy Fawkes (John Pascoe, 1982)
- I Could Have Kicked Myself David Frost and Michael Deakin (Andre Deutsch, 1982)
- Who Wants To Be A Millionaire? Frost David And Michael Deakin (Andre Deutsch Hutchinson, 1983)
- Molesworth Rites Again Simon Brett (London: Hutchinson, 1983)
- 1956 And All That :A Memorable History of England Since The War To End All Wars (Two) Ned Sherrin and Neil Shand (Michael Joseph, 1984)
- Animal Quotations G. F. Lamb (ed) (Longman, 1985)
- Adam And Eve Willie Rushton; And The Artists of the Portal Gallery (Bell & Hyman, 1985.)
- If You'll Believe That... David Frost (ed) (Methuen, 1986)
- Nudge Nudge, Wink Wink : A Quotebook of Love And Sex Nigel Rees (Javelin Books, 1986)
- Scenes From Hysterical Life: Diary of a Mad Housewife Dorothy Baker Tarrant (Sidgewick And Jackson, 1986)
- World's Shortest Books David Frost (Collins/Fontana, 1987)
- Please Give Generously Anthony Swainson (David & Charles, 1987)
- A Family at Law Douglas Stewart and Gavin Campbell (Fourmat, 1988)
- Dear Pup Letters to a Young Dog Diana Pullein-Thompson (Barrie & Jenkins, 1988)
- Bad Behaviour Guy Philipps (ed.) (Elm Tree, 1988)
- You Might As Well Be Dead Richard Ingrams (Quartet, 1988)
- But I Digress: The Collected Monologues of Ramblin' Ronnie Corbett David Renwick (New English Library, 1989.)
- Agreeable World of Wallace Arnold Craig Brown (Fourth Estate, 1990)
- Soft Targets From The Weekend Guardian: Poems Simon Rae (Bloodaxe Books, 1991)
- Thatcher's Inferno Simon Rae (Smith/Doorstop, 1992)
- A Burning Candle, The Literary Review Anthology of Poetry Edited By Dariane Pictet, Introduced By Auberon Waugh (Peterborough, Uk: Poetry No, 1993)
- Happy Families: An Old Game With New Faces (Mandarin, 1993)
- The Mad Officials Christopher Booker and Dr. Richard North (Constable, 1994)
- When the Lights Went Out Wanda Anderson (ed) (Friends of St. Helena Hospice, Colchester, 1995)
- Gullible's Travails Brian Rix (ed) (André Deutsch, 1996)
