= Adventures of a Plumber's Mate =

1978 British film by Stanley Long

- Theatrical ball
- Directed by: Stanley Long
- Written by: Stephen D. Frances; Aubrey Cash
- Produced by: Stanley Long; Peter Long
- Starring: Christopher Neil; Arthur Mullard; Stephen Lewis; Willie Rushton
- Cinematography: Peter Sinclair
- Edited by: Joe Gannon
- Music by: Christopher Neil
- Distributed by: Salon Productions
- Release date: 18 May 1978
- Running time: 88 minutes
- Country: United Kingdom
- Language: English

Adventures of a Plumber's Mate is a 1978 British sex comedy film directed by Stanley Long and starring Christopher Neil as Sid South. It was written by Stephen D. Frances and Aubrey Cash. Following Adventures of a Taxi Driver (1976) and Adventures of a Private Eye (1977), it was the final film of the series.

== Cast ==
- Christopher Neil as Sid South
- Arthur Mullard as Blackie
- Stephen Lewis as Crapper
- Anna Quayle as Loretta Proudfoot
- Willie Rushton as Dodger
- Nina West as Sally
- Prudence Drage as Janice
- Suzy Mandel as first tennis girl
- Christopher Biggins as Robin
- Elaine Paige as Susie (credited as Daisy)
- Leon Greene as Biggs
- Peter Cleall as Carson
- Richard Caldicot as Wallings
- Jonathan Adams as rent collector
- Claire Davenport as Belinda
- Jerold Wells as Stropper
- Derek Martin as motorcycle dealer

Stephen Lewis's character Crapper is very similar to his TV role in On The Buses as Inspector Blake.

== Critical reception ==
For Monthly Film Bulletin, Tim Pulleine wrote: "A glum essay in blue-nosed British farce, featuring a dismayingly loutish protagonist and rapidly abandoning any pretence at an integrated plot. The most regrettable aspect of the film is that a vicious criminal who beats up his wife is presented as an acceptable figure of fun. Elsewhere, the lack of concern for convincing detail is demonstrated by having a supposed Picasso painting hanging on the side of the owner's swimming pool."

The Radio Times Guide to Films gave the film 1/5 stars, writing: "An example of the British blue comedy boom of the 1970s, this tatty tale presents wife-beating as slapstick. Christopher Neil is unappealing as the hero, whose attempts to settle his debts bring him into contact with endless sex-starved women and gangster William Rushton."
