= Adventures of a Taxi Driver =

1976 British film by Stanley Long

- Theatrical release poster
- Directed by: Stanley Long
- Written by: Suzanne Mercer; Stanley Long
- Produced by: Stanley Long; Peter Long; Michael Armstrong
- Starring: Barry Evans; Judy Geeson; Adrienne Posta
- Cinematography: Peter Sinclair
- Edited by: Joe Gannon
- Distributed by: Salon Productions
- Release date: 23 May 1976
- Running time: 88 minutes
- Country: United Kingdom
- Language: English
- Budget: £30,000

Adventures of a Taxi Driver is a 1976 British sex comedy film directed by Stanley Long and starring Barry Evans, Judy Geeson and Adrienne Posta. It was written by Suzanne Mercer and Long.

There are two sequels, Adventures of a Private Eye (1977) and Adventures of a Plumber's Mate (1978).

== Plot ==
Fed up with living at home with his annoying mother, taxi driver Joe North moves in with his mate Tom and his girlfriend, a stripper with a pet snake. The film details his adventures with a waitress, another stripper, a wealthy housewife, his fiancée, a group of pretend-kidnappers, a prostitute, a female impersonator, and the police.

== Cast ==
- Barry Evans as Joe North
- Judy Geeson as Nikki
- Adrienne Posta as Carol
- Diana Dors as Mrs. North
- Liz Fraser as Maisie
- Ian Lavender as Ronald
- Robert Lindsay as Tom
- Jane Hayden as Linda
- Stephen Lewis as doorman
- Henry McGee as Inspector Rogers
- Angela Scoular as Marion
- Brian Wilde as Harold
- Anna Bergman as Helga
- Prudence Drage as Mrs De Vere Barker

== Production ==
Long financed the film entirely himself and shot it on 16mm.

It was one of a number of British sex comedies featuring Diana Dors. The theme song "Cruisin' Casanova" was performed by Adrienne Posta.

== Reception ==
=== Box office ===
The movie was a box office success. It was the 19th most successful film at the British box office in 1976.

=== Critical ===
The Monthly Film Bulletin wrote "A crass, lobotomised production, with no discernible style, humour or purpose. Stanley Long draws irritatingly smug performances from Barry Evans, Judy Geeson and, particularly, Adrienne Posta; and his view of women and sex is more objectionable than that of the most passionless, clinical, primitively shot stag movie."

The Radio Times Guide to Films gave the film 2/5 stars, writing: "Back in the 1970s, smutty comedies such as this were the order of the day for comedy actors trying to break into movies. Barry Evans, who came to prominence in the Doctor in the House TV series, plays a cabbie who moves away from his nagging family and enjoys a number of amorous encounters."
