= Trivia Test Match =

1986–1993 BBC Radio programme

Trivia Test Match is a British radio programme that aired originally from 1986 to 1993 on BBC Radio and has been repeated more recently on BBC Radio 4 Extra (formerly known as BBC Radio 7). There were two series. The episode list identified 17 episodes, but in the final episode the presenter referred to 10 episodes in the first series and 8 in the second.

As its slogan stated, it combined trivia and the laws of cricket. It was hosted by longtime BBC cricket commentator Brian Johnston, who served as the "umpire."

In each episode, the team captains Tim Rice and Willie Rushton were joined by another celebrity from showbiz or cricket. The teams are offered a choice of question for 1 or 4 runs - the single being an easier question than the boundary. The batting team receives up to six questions (or an over) before questioning turns to the other team. The questions usually revolve around trivia and unusual facts.

However, there are ways in which a team can win back the questioning more quickly. If a team doesn't give the correct answer, the opposing team can shout 'Howzat!' and offer the correct answer to score a wicket and win the questioning. ("Howzat" in cricket is usually said by the bowler to the umpire to ask if the batsman's wicket was taken by the bowl.) If they challenge the answer unsuccessfully, the batting team receives 2 runs in overthrows as compensation and keeps the batting.

Each team also has three bouncers, prepared earlier. They can say 'Bouncer' before the next question is asked. All the bouncers are very difficult (often estimation questions) and score six runs if successfully answered. (Six being the number of runs awarded for a boundary which doesn't hit the ground) However, a wicket is lost and the batting goes to the other team if the answer is wrong.

The winning team is the one which scores the most runs by the end of the programme (the fewer number of wickets splitting any ties).

Panellists on the programme have included Stephen Fry, William Franklyn, Rachael Heyhoe-Flint, Jeremy Beadle, Paul Merton and Leslie Thomas.

The programme was written and devised by Peter Hickey and Malcolm Williamson.
