= VistaScreen =

Defunct British 3D photography company

Vista Screen Company Limited
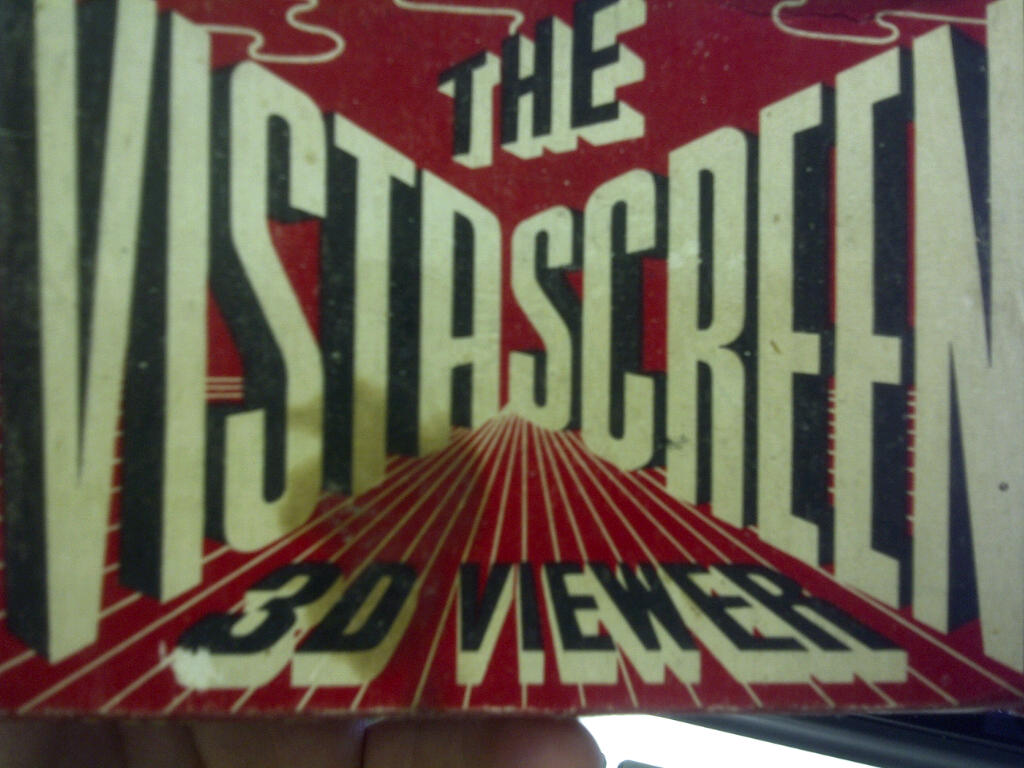
- Industry: 3D Viewer
- Founded: 1956
- Defunct: 1961
- Fate: Sold to Weetabix in 1961
- Headquarters: 16, Soho Square,
- Key people: Jack Spring & Jeffrey Leigh (Financiers and majority-share owners), Stanley Long (Principal photographer & minority-share owner)
- Products: VistaScreen 3D Viewer
- Parent: Capital Paper Company

The VistaScreen Co Ltd was a stereographic photography outfit launched in the late 1950s by Jack Spring & Jeffrey Leigh, who, at the time, owned a paper merchanting company called Capital Paper Company, and Stanley Long, a former RAF photographer. Long shot the vast majority of the stereo images, mostly using a 1920s Franke & Heidecke Heidoscop stereo camera with a 6x13 cm plate back. The VistaScreen viewers were manufactured in ivory-colored plastic and were designed to fold flat in order to be able to be compactly stored.

The viewers were priced at 1/6d (around 7.5p in today's terms). The 3D experience given by these viewers was astonishing for the time at which they were invented, whereas more discriminating collectors favored use of higher quality viewers such as those produced by Raumbild. Picture cards were supplied in boxed booklets, with each series containing 10 cards. The individual series packets cost 2/6d (around 12.5p today).

The card packets were marketed at souvenir booths at various locations photographed, and most were also available through mail-order. In some instances, two sets would be taken on a given day - one exclusive to the venue, and one that was marketed to the general public through supply lists included with each new set. The exact number of series released is unknown, though it is known to be in excess of 300 10-card sets over the 5-year lifespan of the company.

One of the rarest sets was that of the Irving Theatre in London, where Stanley Long was the in-house photographer.

Although most of the stereoviews produces by the company focused on Great Britain, or at least intended for UK viewers, there is evidence that some VistaScreen sets were printed in other languages and sold in non-Anglophone markets.

Later, VistaScreen was also featured in a Weetabix breakfast cereal promotion with red branded viewers. The promotion lasted for a number of years and featured 6 different sets of 25 3D cards; Working Dogs, Thrills, British Cars, British Birds, Animals and Our Pets. The Weetabix promotion gave away single cards with their breakfast cereal and the viewers could be purchased by mail order directly from the Weetabix factory. These were the same as the originals, but red in colour and with ‘Weetabix’ printed on the back.

Queen guitarist, astrophysicist, and stereography expert Dr. Brian May credits Weetabix VistaScreen cards with his lifelong passion for stereography. May is credited with resurrecting the formerly-defunct London Stereoscopic Company.
