= Stanley Long =

English film director (1933–2012)

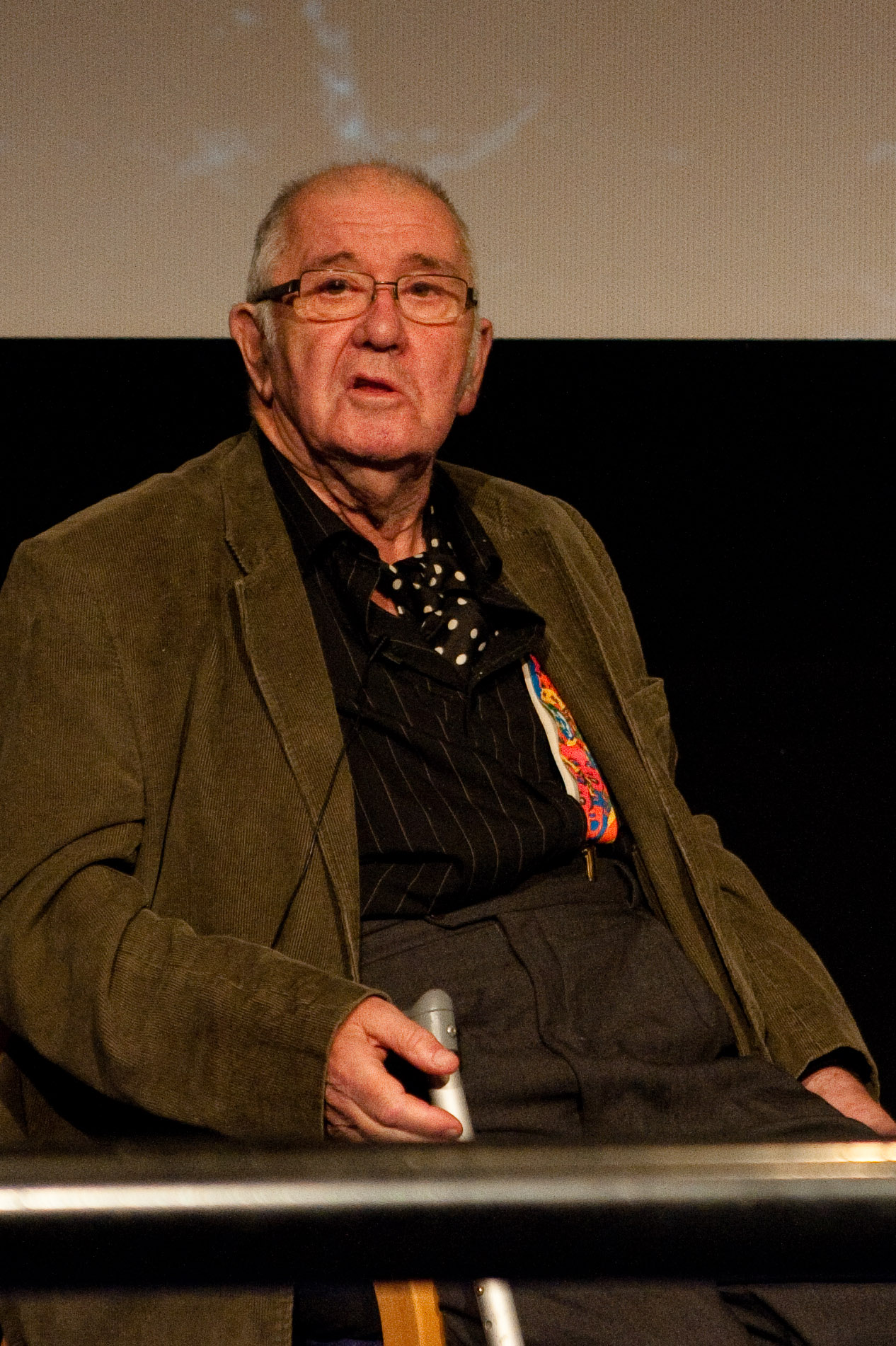
- Born: Stanley Alfred Long; 26 November 1933; London, England
- Died: 10 September 2012 (aged 78); Buckinghamshire, England
- Occupations: Film director, film producer, writer
- Children: one daughter and two grandchildren
- Parent(s): Eleanor and Alfred Long

Stanley A. Long (26 November 1933 – 10 September 2012) was an English exploitation cinema and sexploitation filmmaker. He was also a driving force behind the VistaScreen stereoscopic (3D) photographic company. He was a writer, cinematographer, editor, and eventually, producer/director of low-budget exploitation movies.

== Career ==
Long began his career as a photographer in the Royal Air Force, where he worked in the publicity department during national service. In 1956 he helped found the stereoscopic souvenir and collectible company VistaScreen with the Spring Brothers. VistaScreen was sold to Weetabix in 1961.

He subsequently produced striptease shorts or "glamour home movies" for the 8 mm market under the banner of Stag Film Productions.

Long worked as a cameraman on several British horror and psychological films of the 1960s, including The Blood Beast Terror (1968), Repulsion (1965, uncredited), and The Sorcerers (1967).

In 1963, producer Harry Clifton refinanced Long's Circlorama cinema, which used the Circular Kinopanorama process near Piccadilly Circus. Although Clifton requested a film with hobgoblins, the resulting production, Circlorama Cavalcade, instead featured circus lions, Formula 2 cars, ice skaters, trains at Clapham Junction, and the band The Swinging Blue Jeans.

Long’s work ranged from nudist films such as Nudist Memories (1959) to documentary-style features like The Wife Swappers (1970), to permissive-era productions including Naughty! (1971) and On the Game (1974).

His most commercially successful period came in the mid-1970s, when he directed a series of sex comedies: Adventures of a Taxi Driver (1976), Adventures of a Private Eye (1977), and Adventures of a Plumber's Mate (1978). The films starred performers including Barry Evans, Diana Dors, Irene Handl, Harry H. Corbett, Liz Fraser, and Fred Emney.

Like contemporary filmmaker Norman J. Warren, Long also worked in the horror genre. He directed the anthology film Screamtime (1983) and was at one point attached to direct a Jo Gannon script entitled Plasmid, about albino mutants living in the London Underground. Although the film was never made, a tie-in novel was published.

Long retired from directing in the early 1980s, but returned briefly in 2006 to direct The Other Side of the Screen, a one-off documentary about filmmaking, hosted by Paul Martin.

As an entrepreneur, he founded Salon Productions and later Alpha Film Distribution.

The Adventures films were released on DVD in 2008, followed in 2009 by DVD releases of On the Game, Sex and the Other Woman, and This, That and the Other.

Long was interviewed for the BBC's Balderdash and Piffle (broadcast 25 May 2007), and appeared in the British Films Forever documentary series, in the episodes "Magic, Murder and Monsters" (25 August 2007) and "Sauce, Satire and Sillyness" (9 September 2007).

A biography, X-Rated: Adventures of an Exploitation Filmmaker by Simon Sheridan, was published in July 2008.

== Death ==
Stanley Long died in Buckinghamshire on 10 September 2012, at the age of 78, of natural causes.

== Select credits ==
- West End Jungle (1961)
- Nudist Memories (1961)
- Nudes of the World (1961)
- Take Off Your Clothes and Live! (1963)
- London in the Raw (1964)
- Primitive London (1965)
- Secrets of a Windmill Girl (1966)
- G.G. Passion (1966)
- This, That and the Other (1969)
- Groupie Girl (1970)
- The Wife Swappers (1970)
- Naughty! (1971)
- Bread (1971)
- Sex and the Other Woman (1972)
- On the Game (1974)
- Eskimo Nell (1975)
- It Could Happen to You (1975)
- Adventures of a Taxi Driver (1976)
- Adventures of a Private Eye (1977)
- Adventures of a Plumber's Mate (1978)
- Screamtime (1983)

== See also ==
- Derek Ford
- Pete Walker (director)
- Norman J. Warren
- Robin Askwith
