= Olive McFarland =

British actress (1929–2011)

- Born: 1929; Scotland, UK
- Died: 24 August 2011 (aged 82); Needham Market, Suffolk, England, UK
- Occupation: Actress

Olive McFarland (born Brenda McFarland 1929 – 24 August 2011) was a British actress who appeared in film and television dramas from the 1950s to the 1970s. She starred opposite Sean Connery in the 1961 film The Frightened City.

McFarland's television appearances included Danger Man, Sir Francis Drake,The Sweeney, The Troubleshooters, The Champions and Dixon of Dock Green and she also had a film role in Alive and Kicking (1959). She left acting to restore properties and breed horses. In 1998 following an RSPCA inspection of her farm she was found guilty of neglecting her horses and received a one-month suspended jail sentence.

In January 2010 she moved to a care home at Eye, Suffolk, not far from her farm at Creeting St Mary near Needham Market. She was killed when she was hit by a train at a nearby railway crossing the following year. In September 2016, Network Rail were fined £4 million at Ipswich Crown Court over health and safety failures in connection with McFarland's death.

== Filmography ==
- Alive and Kicking (1959)
- So Evil, So Young (1961)
- The Frightened City (1961)
- Naughty! (1971)
- On the Game (1974)
