= Angela Scoular =

English actress (1945–2011)

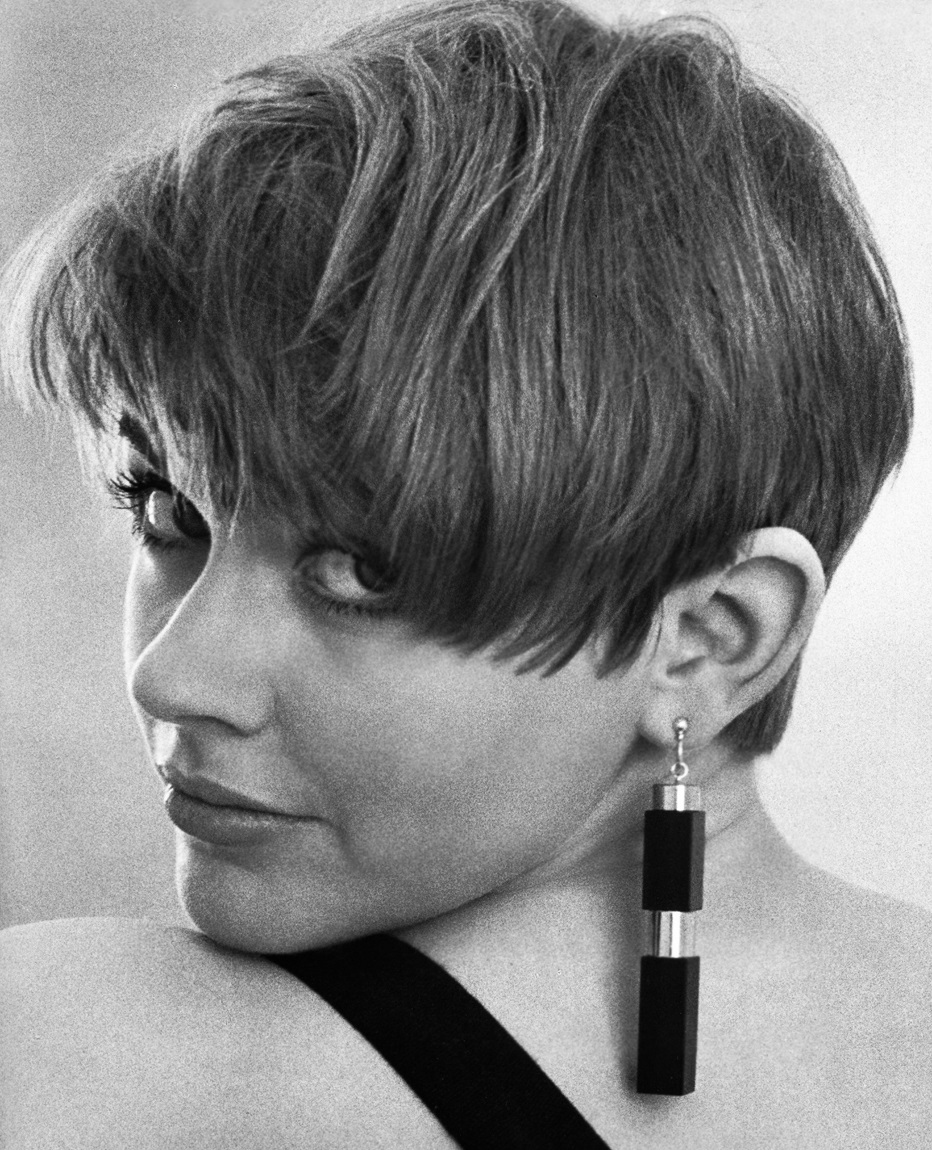
- Scoular in 1968
- Born: Angela Margaret Scoular; 8 November 1945; London, England
- Died: 11 April 2011 (aged 65); London, England
- Occupation: Actress
- Years active: 1963–1996
- Spouse: Leslie Phillips (1982–2011)
- Children: 1
- Relatives: Margaret Johnston (aunt)

Angela Margaret Scoular (8 November 1945 – 11 April 2011) was a British actress.

== Early life ==
Her father was an engineer and she was born in London. She attended St George's School, Harpenden, Queen's College, Harley Street and RADA.

== Career ==
Scoular was among a small group of actors to have appeared in two James Bond films, made by different production companies. Scoular played Buttercup in the comedy Casino Royale (1967) and then two years later made an appearance in the Eon Productions Bond film series playing Ruby in On Her Majesty's Secret Service (1969).

Her other film credits include A Countess from Hong Kong (1967), Here We Go Round the Mulberry Bush (1968), Great Catherine (also 1968), Doctor in Trouble (1970), The Adventurers (1970), Adventures of a Taxi Driver (1976), and Adventures of a Private Eye (1977).

Her television credits included playing Cathy in a 1967 BBC production of Wuthering Heights, Doctor in the House, The Avengers, Coronation Street, Penmarric, As Time Goes By and You Rang, M'Lord? (in the recurring role of Lady Agatha Shawcross).

Scoular appeared in a play entitled Little Lies, starring Sir John Mills, at the Wyndham's Theatre, London, England, which ran from July 1983 through February 1984, written by Joseph George Caruso. The play was produced at the Royal Alexandra Theatre, Toronto, Canada in 1984, with the same cast, for six weeks.

== Personal life ==
She was a niece of actress Margaret Johnston. She moved in with actor Leslie Phillips in 1977, at which time she was pregnant by another actor. She and Phillips, whom she married in 1982, raised her son together.

== Illnesses and death ==
Scoular had depression and anorexia nervosa. She attempted suicide in 1992. It was revealed in March 2009 that she had bowel cancer; she was eventually declared cancer-free, but in the months preceding her death she had feared its return. Weeks before her death, she was arrested for driving under the influence.

She died on 11 April 2011 after ingesting acid drain cleaner and pouring it on her body, causing lethal burns to her digestive tract and skin. An inquest at Westminster Coroner's Court on 20 July 2011 established that Scoular had been an alcoholic and had depression and anxiety about debts; she was on medication for bipolar disorder at the time of her death. The coroner recorded that Scoular had "killed herself while the balance of her mind was disturbed", and stated that her death was not suicide.

== Filmography ==
=== Film ===
- Wuthering Heights (1967) as Cathy Earnshaw
- A Countess from Hong Kong (1967) as The Society Girl
- Casino Royale (1967) as Buttercup
- Here We Go Round the Mulberry Bush (1968) as Caroline Beauchamp
- Great Catherine (1968) as Claire
- On Her Majesty's Secret Service (1969) as Ruby Bartlett
- The Adventurers (1970) as Denisonde
- Doctor in Trouble (1970) as Ophelia O'Brien
- Adventures of a Taxi Driver (1976) as Marion
- Adventures of a Private Eye (1977) as Jane Hogg

=== Television ===
- Romeo and Juliet (1965) as Juliet
- David Copperfield (1966) as Emily
- Girl in a Black Bikini (1967) as Kathy Sheridan
- Wuthering Heights (1967) as Catherine Earnshaw
- The Avengers (1968) as Myra
- Doctor in the House (1969) as Fiona
- Coronation Street (1972) as Sue Silcock
- The Adventurer (1972) as Dorinda Stephenson
- Crown Court (1973) as Serena Cutforth
- Harriet's Back in Town (1973) as Frankie Prentiss
- Beryl's Lot (1974) as Jill Savage
- Rooms (1975) as Madeline Parsons
- Penmarric (1979) as Maud Penmar
- You Rang M'Lord? (1988-1993) as Lady Agatha Shawcross
- As Time Goes By (1996) as Glynis
