= Here We Go Round the Mulberry Bush (novel) =

Novel by British author Hunter Davies

The novel Here We Go Round the Mulberry Bush is an early work by the prolific British author Hunter Davies, probably best known for his biographical books. It is about a sex-obsessed teenage boy living in the Swinging Sixties. It was published by Heinemann in 1965.

Davies was based in London in the 1960s, working for the Sunday Times. However, he set the book in Carlisle, where he had lived in his teens.

== Film adaptation ==
Davies co-wrote the script of the film of the same name, which was released in 1968. It was directed by Clive Donner and filmed on location in Stevenage, a New Town in Hertfordshire, some 30 miles from the British capital.
