= Liz Fraser =

English actress (1930–2018)

- Born: Elizabeth Joan Winch; 14 August 1930; Southwark, London, England
- Died: 6 September 2018 (aged 88); Chelsea, London, England
- Education: Goldsmiths College; London School of Dramatic Art
- Occupation: Actress
- Years active: 1952–2018
- Spouses: Peter Yonwin (m. 1958; div. 1960) Bill Hitchcock (m. 1965; died 1974)

Elizabeth Joan Winch (14 August 1930 – 6 September 2018), known professionally as Liz Fraser, was a British film actress, best known for being cast in provocative comedy roles.

== Early life ==
Elizabeth Joan Winch was born in Southwark, London. Her year of birth was usually cited as 1933, which she gave when auditioning for her role in I'm All Right Jack, because the Boulting Brothers wanted someone younger for the part. In fact she was three years older, as she confirmed in her 2012 autobiography Liz Fraser ... and Other Characters. Her father was a travelling salesman for a brewery and her mother owned a corner shop just off the New Kent Road. Their family life was disrupted by the Second World War, when she was evacuated, initially to Westerham in Kent and then, when that was deemed still too vulnerable to bombing, to Chudleigh, a town in Devon. Her father died in May 1942, aged 40, when she was 11.

She went to St Saviour's and St Olave's Grammar School for Girls between the ages of 13 and 17. She then attended evening courses at Goldsmiths College, where she joined a drama group, and the City of London College for Commerce, Book-Keeping, Shorthand and Typing, and won an evening scholarship to the London School of Dramatic Art.

== Career ==
Her first film appearance was in Touch and Go (1955), using her birth name, and The Smallest Show on Earth (1957) in which she worked with Peter Sellers for the first time. Fraser also appeared in commercial television's first live play The Geranium for Associated-Rediffusion. She made an uncredited appearance as June in Alive and Kicking (1959), Her breakthrough role was as the daughter of Sellers's character in I'm All Right Jack (1959), for which she received a BAFTA nomination as Most Promising Newcomer. She was in several of the early Carry On films: Carry On Regardless (1961), Carry On Cruising (1962), and Carry On Cabby (1963), but was sacked by producer Peter Rogers after casually saying the series could be better marketed. She re-appeared in the series in Carry On Behind (1975), her salary apparently half of what it had been before.

Her other film appearances include Desert Mice (1959), Two-Way Stretch (1960), again with Sellers, The Bulldog Breed (1960), Double Bunk (1961), Fury at Smugglers Bay (1961) starring Peter Cushing, Raising the Wind (1961), On the Fiddle (1961), The Painted Smile (1962), The Americanization of Emily (1964), The Family Way (1966), Up the Junction (1968), Dad's Army (1971), and a string of sex comedies: Adventures of a Taxi Driver (1976), Confessions of a Driving Instructor (1976), Adventures of a Private Eye (1977), Confessions from a Holiday Camp (1977) and Rosie Dixon – Night Nurse (1978).

Fraser was also known for her many appearances in British television series, including Hancock's Half Hour, and the Avengers episode "The Girl from Auntie" where she guest starred opposite Carry On regular Bernard Cribbins. As Elizabeth Fraser, over a period of nearly six months, she appeared in numerous editions of the Associated-Rediffusion soap opera Sixpenny Corner (1955–56). She appeared on Benny Hill's late-1950s TV shows, and in a single sketch in the 23 December 1970 episode of his Thames TV series. This episode was in black and white (owing to the "Colour Strike" by ITV technicians, who wanted to be paid extra for working with the then-new colour TV technology), and hence the sketch was not included in any of the half-hour syndicated episodes of The Benny Hill Show. However, it is included in the Volume 1 box set of the complete Benny Hill Show, issued by A&E and Fremantle.

Fraser also starred as Gloria Simpkins in the radio sitcom Parsley Sidings alongside Arthur Lowe and Kenneth Connor from 1971 to 1973.

She played Mrs Brent, the mother of a missing girl, in the television production of Agatha Christie's Nemesis, starring Joan Hickson as Miss Marple, in 1987. Another role was in the "Backtrack" episode of the British action drama The Professionals, as Margery Harper, a glamorous woman who fenced stolen property in her shop.

Her other television work included Randall and Hopkirk (Deceased), Crown Court, Citizen James, Robin's Nest, Rumpole of the Bailey, Last of the Summer Wine, The Bill, Foyle's War, Birds of a Feather, Minder and Holby City.

== Personal life and death ==
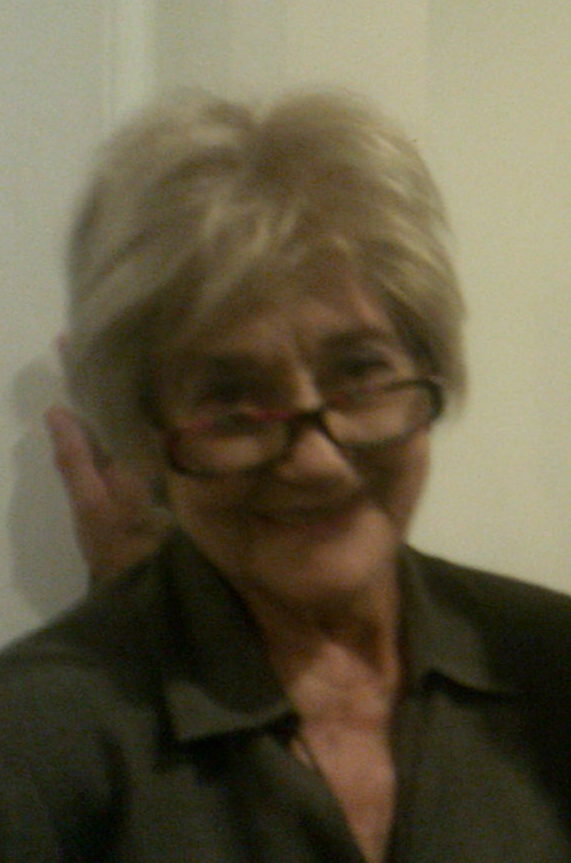
Fraser in 2015

Fraser married Peter Yonwin, a travelling salesman, in November 1958, but the marriage soon broke down, and they were divorced. She married her second husband, Bill Hitchcock, a TV director, in January 1965 at Harrow Register Office. They agreed not to work together, but this changed in 1972 when she appeared in the Rodney Bewes sitcom Albert!, which Hitchcock co-directed, and again later in the same year, when she acted in Turnbull's Finest Half-Hour, a comedy series starring Michael Bates and produced by Hitchcock. Hitchcock died from a pulmonary embolism in February 1974, at the age of 45. Fraser was diagnosed with breast cancer in 1978 and 1979, undergoing a lumpectomy the first time and having reconstructive surgery at the Marsden in 1979.

Fraser had a half-brother, Philip, 11 years older, the son of her mother from a previous marriage. She supported various charities and was a patron of the London Repertory Company. She was also an enthusiastic and talented poker and bridge player.

She died on 6 September 2018 at Royal Brompton Hospital as a result of complications following an operation.

In 2022, a new RNLI D-class (IB1) Inshore lifeboat was placed on station at Fenit Lifeboat Station in County Kerry, in Ireland, funded from the legacy of Liz Fraser. At a ceremony on 29 May 2022, the lifeboat was named Lizzie (D-860).

== Filmography ==
Year	Title	Role	Notes
1955	Touch and Go	Girl on the Bridge	(As Elizabeth Winch)
1957	The Smallest Show on Earth	Girl in Cinema	(uncredited)
1957	The Shiralee	Chambermaid	(uncredited)
1958	Davy	Waitress	
1958	Dunkirk	Worker in Holden's Factory	(uncredited)
1958	Wonderful Things!	Hot Dog Seller	(uncredited)
1958	Alive & Kicking	June	(as Elizabeth Winch)
1959	I'm All Right Jack	Cynthia Kite	
1959	Top Floor Girl	Mabel	
1959	The Night We Dropped a Clanger	Lulu	
1959	Desert Mice	Edie	
1960	Two-Way Stretch	Ethel	
1960	Doctor in Love	Leonora	
1960	The Bulldog Breed	NAAFI Girl	
1960	The Pure Hell of St Trinian's	Constable Susan Partridge	
1961	The Night We Got the Bird	Fay Sellars	
1961	The Rebel	Waitress	
1961	Carry On Regardless	Delia King	
1961	Fury at Smugglers' Bay	Betty	
1961	Double Bunk	Sandra	
1961	Watch It, Sailor!	Daphne Pink	
1961	Raising the Wind	Miranda Kennaway	
1961	On the Fiddle	Girl with Daisies	(uncredited)
1962	A Pair of Briefs	Gloria Hoskins	
1962	Carry On Cruising	Gladys Trimble	
1962	The Painted Smile	Jo Lake	
1962	Live Now – Pay Later	Joyce Corby	
1962	The Amorous Prawn	Pvt. Suzie Tidmarsh	
1963	Carry On Cabby	Sally	
1964	Every Day's a Holiday	Miss Slightly	
1965	The Americanization of Emily	Sheila	
1966	The Family Way	Molly Thompson	
1968	Up the Junction	Mrs. McCarthy	
1971	Dad's Army	Mrs. Pike	
1972	Hide and Seek	Audrey Lawson	
1975	Three for All	Airport Passenger	
1975	Carry On Behind	Sylvia Ramsden	
1976	Adventures of a Taxi Driver	Maisie	
1976	Confessions of a Driving Instructor	Mrs. Chalmers	
1976	Under the Doctor	Sandra	
1977	Adventures of a Private Eye	Violet	
1977	Confessions from a Holiday Camp	Mrs. Whitemonk	
1978	Rosie Dixon – Night Nurse	Mrs. Dixon	
1980	The Great Rock 'n' Roll Swindle	Woman in Cinema	
1990	Chicago Joe and the Showgirl	Mrs. Evans	

== Television appearances ==
Year	Title	Role	Notes
1955	The Geranium	Maid	TV film
1955	Sixpenny Corner	Julie Perkins	Unknown episodes
1956–1960	Hancock's Half Hour	Various characters	8 episodes
1956	The Grove Family	Julie Perkins	Episode: "Sour Grapes"
1957	ITV Television Playhouse	Beryl	Episode: "Two Ducks on a Pond""
1957	Dixon of Dock Green	Jeannie Richards	Episode: "False Alarm"
1957	Shadow Squad	Gilda	2 episodes
1957	The Army Game	Unknown	Episode: "The Misguided Missiles"
1957	Whack-O!	Matron	10 episodes
1958	Hotel Imperial	Unknown	Episode: "The Star in the Penthouse Suite"
1958	Educated Evans	W.R.A.C. Clerk	Episode: "All Change"
1958	Dixon of Dock Green	Maisie Perkins	Episode: "They Don't Like Policemen"
1958	The Sky Larks	Rose	Episode: "Free Beer"
1958	Educating Archie	Unknown	Episode: #1.1
1958	Murder Bag	Unknown	Episode: "Lockhart Probes the Past"
1958	Dixon of Dock Green	Lena	Episode: "Strangers at the Same Table"
1959	No Hiding Place	Rose Glorie	Episode: "Murder with Witnesses"
1959	Boyd Q.C. (1959)	Unknown	Episode: "In a Manner Dangerous"
1959	ITV Play of the Week	Dora	Episode: "Deep and Crisp and Even"
1959	The Vise	Betsy Linton	Episode: "Murder for Revenge"
1960	ITV Television Playhouse	Mavis	Episode: "Incident"
1960	Knight Errant Limited	Gloria MacLean	Episode: "Beauty and the Feast"
1960	BBC Sunday-Night Play	Riggie	Episode: "Doctor in the House"
1960–1962	Citizen James	Liz	7 episodes
1962	Probation Officer	Lorna	Episode: #4.14
1963	No Hiding Place	Sheba	Episode: "Solomon Dancey's Luck"
1963	Harry's Girls	Sally Witherspoon	Episode: "Made in Heaven"
1964	Fire Crackers	Mary Medway	Episode: "Fire Belle for Five"
1965	No Hiding Place	Phyllis Nolan	Episode: "The Grass"
1965	It's Not Me: It's Them!	Mrs. Ember	Episode: #1.2
1966	The Avengers	Georgie Price-Jones	Episode: "The Girl from AUNTIE"
1967	Seven Deadly Virtues	Agnes	Episode: "A Pain in the Neck"
1967	Mickey Dunne	Maisie	Episode: "Big Fleas, Little Fleas"
1970	Randall and Hopkirk (Deceased)	Fay Crackan	Episode: "It's Supposed to be Thicker than Water"
1970	Here Come the Double Deckers!	Zizi Bagor	Episode: "Starstruck"
1970	The Goodies	Miss Heffer	Episode: "Caught in the Act"
1970	The Benny Hill Show	Various Roles	2 episodes
1971	BBC World About Us documentary	Co-presenter	Episode: "Under London Expedition"
1971	ITV Sunday Night Theatre	Countess Antonescu	Episode: "Man and Boy"
1972	Jason King	Claire Brown	Episode: "An Author in Search of Two Characters"
1972	Crime of Passion	Denise	Episode: "Lina"
1972	Dear Mother...Love Albert	Ann	Episode: "If He'd Meant Us to Fly"
1972	Turnbull's Finest Half-Hour	Faye Bush	5 episodes
1972	These Two Fellas	Various	TV film
1973	The Tarbuck Follies	Various	TV film
1973	Crown Court	Lady Esham	Episode: "Murder Most Foul"
1977	Seven Faces of Woman	Delilah Brown	Episode: "She: Sight Unseen"
1978	Rumpole of the Bailey	Bobby Dogherty	Episode: "Rumpole and the Alternative Society"
1978	Robin's Nest	Vera	Episode: "The Happy Hen"
1979	The Professionals	Margery Harper	Episode: "Backtrack"
1984	Shroud for a Nightingale	Sister Mavis Gearing	All 5 episodes
1984–1986	Fairly Secret Army	Doris Entwhistle	11 episodes
1987	Miss Marple	Mrs. Brent	Episode: "Nemesis"
1987	Hardwicke House	Agnes	4 episodes
1988	Rude Health	Mrs. Joy	4 episodes
1988	ScreenPlay	Mrs. Dewey	Episode: "Eskimos Do It"
1988	The Lady and the Highwayman	Flossie	TV film
1989	Capstick's Law	Florence Smith	Episode: #1.3
1989	The Bill	Mrs. Lister	Episode: "Suffocation Job"
1989	Streetwise	Barbie Crossley	Episode: "Teamwork"
1991	Birds of a Feather	Olive Stubbs	Episode: "Just Family"
1993	Minder	Delilah	Episode: "How to Succeed in Business Without Really Retiring"
1993	Demob	Edith	All 6 episodes
1994	The Bill	Grace Walsh	Episode: "Good Days"
1996	Wales Playhouse	Nel	Episode: "Every Cloud"
1997	Drover's Gold	Ma Whistler	Episode: #1.5
2000	Hold to Zero	Grace	2 episodes
2000	Last of the Summer Wine	Reggie Unsworth	2 episodes
2006	Pickles: The Dog Who Won the World Cup	Ada	TV film
2006	Doctors	Beryl Gifford	Episode: "The Comedians"
2007	Foyle's War	Mollie Summersgill	Episode: "Bleak Midwinter"
2007	Holby City	Tabitha Blackstock	Episode: "The Human Jungle"
2018	Midsomer Murders	Marcia Jackson	Episode: "Till Death Do Us Part"

== Bibliography ==
- Fraser, Liz (1980). "Contributor". David Jacob's Book of Celebrities' Jokes & Anecdotes. By Jacobs, David. Robson Books. p. 53. ISBN 0860511251.

== Sources ==
- Simon Sheridan Keeping the British End Up: Four Decades of Saucy Cinema, Titan Books (2011, 4th edition); ISBN 9780857682796
