= Here We Go Round the Mulberry Bush (film) =

1968 British film directed by Clive Donner

- British quad poster
- Directed by: Clive Donner
- Screenplay by: Hunter Davies; Larry Kramer (additional dialogue)
- Based on: Here We Go Round the Mulberry Bush by Hunter Davies
- Produced by: Clive Donner
- Starring: Barry Evans; Judy Geeson; Angela Scoular; Sheila White; Adrienne Posta; Vanessa Howard; Diane Keen
- Cinematography: Alex Thomson
- Edited by: Fergus McDonell
- Music by: Traffic; Spencer Davis Group; Andy Ellison
- Production company: Giant Production Films
- Distributed by: United Artists
- Release date: 4 January 1968 (London)
- Running time: 96 minutes
- Country: United Kingdom
- Language: English

Here We Go Round the Mulberry Bush is a 1968 British comedy film produced and directed by Clive Donner and starring Barry Evans, Judy Geeson and Angela Scoular. The screenplay is by Hunter Davies based on his 1965 novel of the same name.

== Plot ==
Jamie McGregor is a virginal sixth-former in a Swinging Sixties new town, delivering groceries for the local supermarket. However he is more interested in matters sexual and sets out to lose his virginity by attempting to seduce the local girls – Linda, Paula, Caroline, and his dream girl, Mary. He ultimately succeeds in bedding the sexually aggressive Audrey, only to learn too late that sex is not as important as he initially believed.

== Cast ==
- Barry Evans as Jamie McGregor
- Judy Geeson as Mary Gloucester
- Angela Scoular as Caroline Beauchamp
- Sheila White as Paula
- Adrienne Posta as Linda
- Vanessa Howard as Audrey
- Maxine Audley as Mrs. Beauchamp
- Denholm Elliott as Mr. Beauchamp
- Moyra Fraser as Mrs. McGregor
- Michael Bates as Mr. McGregor
- Diane Keen as Claire
- Christopher Timothy as Spike
- Nicky Henson as Craig Foster
- Allan Warren as Joe McGregor
- Roy Holder as Arthur
- George Layton as Gordon
- Christopher Mitchell as Tony
- Angela Pleasence as scruffy girl
- Marianne Stone as Mrs. Kelly
- Anthony Finch as boy at Bowes Lyon House

== Production ==
=== Filming ===
The location for the film was Stevenage New Town, Hertfordshire. Buildings featured include Stevenage Clock Tower in the town centre, which was the first purpose-built traffic-free shopping zone in Britain. The sailing scenes at the "Botel" were filmed on Grafham Water, Huntingdonshire.

=== Music ===
The music was released by United Artists Records on a soundtrack album in 1968. It has been re-issued on CD by Rykodisc. The Spencer Davis Group provided most of the music and made a cameo appearance in the film at a church fete. The title track "Here We Go Round the Mulberry Bush" was written and performed by Traffic. Traffic also have two other songs on the soundtrack album "Am I What I Was or Was I What I Am" and a version of "Utterly Simple" that is different from the recording used on the album Mr Fantasy. Andy Ellison of the group John's Children also appears on the soundtrack album with the song "It's Been a Long Time".

== Release ==
It was listed to compete at the 1968 Cannes Film Festival, but the festival was cancelled due to the events of May 1968 in France.

=== Home media ===
The film was released on DVD and Blu-ray officially for the first time by the British Film Institute (BFI) in September 2010 as part of its "Flipside" strand.

== Reception ==
=== Box office ===
The film was the 14th-most popular movie at the Australian box office in 1969. It was the 10th-most popular film in general release at the British box office in 1968.

=== Critical reception ===
The Monthly Film Bulletin wrote: "For teenagers and about teenagers, uncritically embracing the worst aspects of the adolescent's mentality ... the only incongruity about Here We Go Round the Mulberry Bush is that it should have been made by adults, so totally does it enter into the teenager's view of himself. ... In Donner's vision of Stevenage, it is not Jamie's sexual daydreams but his anxiety about his virginity which takes on the aspect of fantasy: the problem is no longer how to lose it so much as with whom. Girls from every walk of life offer themselves to him with alarming facility. And were the characters not such empty caricatures ... there would be a lot to say about the unpleasant, purely exploitative nature of all the relationships in this film; ... Inevitably, in this adolescent view of the world, the adult characters are also distorted caricatures ... But at least the sheer professional competence of Moyra Fraser and Denholm Elliott does occasionally provoke a reluctant smile."
