= Groupie Girl =

1970 British film by Derek Ford

- American release poster
- Directed by: Derek Ford
- Written by: Derek Ford; Suzanne Mercer
- Produced by: Stanley Long
- Starring: Billy Boyle; Donald Sumpter; Richard Shaw; Esme Johns
- Cinematography: Stanley Long
- Edited by: Tony Hawk
- Music by: Opal Butterfly; English Rose
- Release date: June 1970
- Running time: 87 minutes
- Country: United Kingdom
- Language: English
- Budget: £16,000
- Box office: £50,000 (US only)

Groupie Girl is a 1970 British drama film, directed by Derek Ford and starring Esme Johns, Donald Sumpter and the band Opal Butterfly. The film was written by Ford and former groupie Suzanne Mercer.

American International Pictures bought the US distribution rights for £50,000 and released the film in America in 1971 under the title I am a Groupie. It was released in France in 1973, with additional sex scenes, as Les demi-sels de la perversion (The Pimps of Perversion). It was re-released in France in 1974 as Les affamées du mâle (Man-Hungry Women), this time with hardcore inserts. Seventeen minutes of hardcore footage, shot for the film, were discovered in 2024.

== Plot ==
Sally runs away from her strict upbringing, straight to London, where she sleeps with men from pop groups.

== Cast ==
- Billy Boyle as Wesley
- Donald Sumpter as Steve
- Richard Shaw as Morrie
- Esme Johns as Sally
- James Beck as Brian
- Paul Bacon as Alfred
- Neil Hallett as Detective Sergeant
- Flanagan as Thief
- Eliza Terry as Suzy
- Belinda Caren as Pat
- Trevor Adams as Barry
- Ken Hutchison as Colin
- Jimmy Edwards as Bob
- Jenny Nevison as Moira
- Opal Butterfly as themselves

== Production ==
Ford complained to Cinema X magazine: "We were shooting in a discotheque one Saturday night and my ears rang right through to Monday morning. I was sick – physically sick – on Sunday from the noise level we suffered."

== Soundtrack ==
A soundtrack album was released in 1970 (UK: Polydor 2384 021). English Rose were Lynton Guest, Jimmy Edwards and Paul Wolloff, who also have minor roles in the film.

Side 1

1. "You're A Groupie Girl" (Opal Butterfly)
2. "To Jackie" (English Rose)
3. "Four Wheel Drive" (The Salon Band)
4. "Got A Lot Of Life" (Virgin Stigma)
5. "I Wonder Did You" (Billy Boyle)
6. "Gigging Song" (Opal Butterfly)
7. "Disco 2" (The Salon Band)
8. "Now You're Gone, I'm A Man" (Virgin Stigma)

Side 2

1. "Yesterday's Hero" (English Rose)
2. "Love Me, Give A Little" (Virgin Stigma)
3. "Looking For Love" (Billy Boyle)
4. "Sweet Motion" (The Salon Band)
5. "Love's a Word Away" (English Rose)
6. "True Blue" (The Salon Band)
7. "Groupie Girl, It Doesn't Matter What You Do" (Virgin Stigma)

== Critical reception ==
Monthly Film Bulletin said: "Tedious cautionary tale whose blend of sex, loose life and pop music has obviously been compounded for a specific market which will care little if the story becomes increasingly contrived as it proceeds and will probably remain unmoved by the moralising coda and quite touching fade-out. Elsewhere the tone is, if anything, amoral and the sexploitation blatant."

Variety said: "This is obviously a quick attempt to cash-in on a facet of the pop group scene and, tawdry though it is, it may catch the interest of youngsters, intrigued by title and theme. ... Dialog and situations are stereotyped and Ford's direction is conventional and uninspired. It's not helped either by minimal thesping and diction of a cast, the femmes of which, at least, seem mainly to be intro'd for a number of strip scenes. Lensing and editing are reasonably okay and the two groups, named in the pic as "The Sweaty Betty" and "Orange Butterfly", put over some pop numbers pretty well and some may well click on the Polydor label."

== Releases ==
The film was released on UK DVD in January 2007 by Slam Dunk Media as part of their "Saucy Seventies" series.
