= On the Game =

1974 British comedy film by Stanley Long

- Directed by: Stanley Long
- Written by: Suzanne Mercer
- Produced by: Stanley Long; Barry Jacobs
- Starring: Lloyd Lamble; Gloria Walker; Olive McFarland; Carmen Silvera; David Brierly; Fiona Victory; Peter Duncan
- Narrated by: Charles Gray
- Production company: Salon Productions
- Release date: 23 February 1974
- Running time: 88 minutes
- Country: United Kingdom
- Language: English

On the Game is a 1974 British sex comedy film directed by Stanley Long and starring Charles Gray. It was written by Suzanne Mercer, who spent two years researching it. The film is a dramatised comedy documentary about prostitution through the ages. 23 minutes of hardcore footage, shot for the film was discovered in 2024.

== Cast ==
- Charles Gray as narrator
- Lloyd Lamble as Gladstone
- Gloria Walker as Jenny
- Olive McFarland as Mrs. Dubery
- Carmen Silvera as Mrs. Berkley
- Paddy Ryan as Accomplice
- David Brierly as Prince of Wales
- Fiona Victory as Giulia Barucci
- Heather Chasen as Madame
- Peter Duncan as Francois
- Louise Pajo as Shirley
- Jeremy Nicholas as Policeman
- Flanagan as Lil
- Nicola Austin as Messalina
- Val Penny as Prostitute
- Lucienne Camille as Therapist

== Production ==
Mercer said, "Had I lived in 16th century Italy, or in the 1860's in France I probably would have been a courtesan ... I don’t think On the Game is anti-feminist ... In my view, no woman need be oppressed or repressed. I’m a chick, married for seven years, and I lead an independent life. I work in a very tough business.”

== Critical reception ==
Monthly Film Bulletin wrote: "Tawdry in the extreme, On the Game is a shoe-string production that almost becomes a high camp exercise in minimal film-making: a garden somewhere in Greater London – in early spring, with a small flight of goosepimpled dolly-birds – stands in for the temple meads of Babylon, and elsewhere a quarry and various London town houses do service for various periods, The film bids, from time to time, to be taken seriously for its historical stance, but such efforts are briskly guyed by its fun-poking notion of bawdy humour."

The East Kent Times and Mail called it "an informative and entertaining film."
