= Vicki Woolf =

British actress (born 1942)

- Born: 1942 (age 83–84); Brighton, Sussex; United Kingdom
- Other name: Vicki Wolf
- Occupation: Actress
- Years active: 1960–present
- Spouse: Ewen Solon

Vicki Woolf (born 1942) is a British actress known mostly for her roles in television.

She appeared in fourteen episodes of Honey Lane during the 1960s. In the 1980s she featured in the sitcom Three Up, Two Down. She guest starred on various other shows such as The Saint, The Persuaders!, Man in a Suitcase, Paul Temple and Minder.

She made appearances in several films including two Hammer Horrors and Carry On Up the Khyber (1968). In 1973 she was in the film version of Never Mind the Quality: Feel the Width. Woolf was often cast as exotic types, sometimes from southern Europe.

Woolf married the actor Ewen Solon in London in 1965.

== Bibliography ==
- Michael, Robert & Cotter, Bobb. The Women of Hammer Horror: A Biographical Dictionary and Filmography. McFarland, 2013.
- Ross, Andrew, Carry On Actors. Andrews, 2011.
