= List of Rising Damp episodes =

Rising Damp is a British sitcom written by Eric Chappell. It stars Leonard Rossiter as landlord Rupert Rigsby, Richard Beckinsale as Alan Moore, Frances de la Tour as Ruth Jones, and Don Warrington as Philip Smith. Alan, Miss Jones and Philip reside as lodgers in Rigsby's house.

The original run of Rising Damp was transmitted on ITV in four series from 1974 to 1978. Rising Damp (1980), a feature film based on the programme, premiered on 5 March 1980. It was written by Eric Chappell, and directed by Joseph McGrath.

== Series overview ==
Series	Episodes	Originally released	
Series	Episodes	First released	Last released
1	7	2 September 1974	27 December 1974
2	8	7 November 1975	26 December 1975
3	7	12 April 1977	24 May 1977
4	6	4 April 1978	9 May 1978

== Episodes ==
=== Series 1 (1974) ===
No.	Title	Original release date	Prod. code	U.K. viewers (millions)
1	"The New Tenant"	2 September 1974	101	6.15
Stingy, pretentious landlord Rigsby is looking for another lodger. One of his current lodgers, Miss Jones, is keen for her acquaintance, Philip, to move in—because she is attracted to him. He says that he is from Africa and is the son of a chief. He almost decides not to move in, due to the fact that he dislikes Rigsby and is not attracted to Miss Jones and was unaware that he would be living in close proximity to her. This episode is alternatively titled "Rooksby", after the character in the stage play The Banana Box, from which Rising Damp was adapted. The character was renamed to Rigsby because a real-life landlord named Rooksby complained.
2	"Black Magic"	22 November 1974	102	N/A
Rigsby is sceptical but intrigued by a ritual which Philip shows him - banging his spear on the ground to summon a woman. When Philip does so, Miss Jones comes to the room. Rigsby's other lodger Alan later does so; Miss Jones comes in and hugs him in the dark, expecting it to be Philip; she is disappointed when she realises that it is Alan. Rigsby later does likewise, hoping it will attract Miss Jones - but is disappointed when Philip and Alan come to the room instead.
3	"A Night Out"	29 November 1974	103	N/A
Rigsby, Alan, Philip and Ruth go out to an upmarket restaurant (which has a strict dress code) for Ruth's birthday. Rigsby borrows his new lodger Spooner's suit, without his permission - and Alan borrows Spooner's bow tie. Spooner shows up and angrily takes the tie from Alan and demands that Rigsby return the suit to him. Spooner rips the right sleeve off the suit. The restaurant's manager throws Rigsby and Alan out for being improperly dressed.
4	"Charisma"	6 December 1974	104	N/A
Alan wears an earring to attract the opposite sex, which Rigsby disapproves of. Alan sneaks Maureen into his room; Rigsby hears her and ejects her. Rigsby asks Miss Jones to a wrestling match, which she declines. Alan gives him some tablets and a Matt Monro LP, suggesting that he take one of the tablets and play the record whilst talking to her. Philip gives Rigsby a medallion to wear. After Rigsby leaves the room, Alan informs Philip that the tablets are tranquillisers which were withdrawn from the market because they turn the patients' urine green. Rigsby plays the record at the wrong speed, and she rejects his attempt to seduce her. He collapses and falls asleep for 24 hours. He sees a doctor, who tells him that the tablets are for pregnant women. Philip advises Rigsby to burn the wood of the love tree outside Miss Jones's room as an aphrodisiac. She finds the smell unpleasant, so she sprays Rigsby and the wood with water. Philip tells him that the piece of wood came off the wardrobe.
5	"All Our Yesterdays"	13 December 1974	105	6.50
Spooner (Derek Newark) annoys the household by playing his radio loudly. Rigsby is annoyed, but finds it difficult to pluck up the courage to confront him about it. He fires his gun, which he wrongly believed was not loaded. He thinks that he shot Spooner through his door, but after going into Spooner's room he realises that he did not, but Spooner is angry about being disturbed.
6	"The Prowler"	20 December 1974	106	7.10
Miss Jones sees a prowler through her window, and Rigsby suspects everyone else. A police detective appears and begins to investigate. When the real police arrive later, Rigsby realises that the detective was bogus - and that he stole Rigsby's cash which he had hid in a tin under the floorboards. Features George Sewell as the bogus detective.
7	"Stand Up and Be Counted"	27 December 1974	107	6.95
An election polarises the household: Rigsby supports the Conservatives, Alan and Philip lean towards Labour, whilst Miss Jones is impressed with Platt (Ian Lavender) the Liberal candidate. After being disapproved of by Col. De Vere-Brown (Anthony Sharp) the Conservative candidate when he visits the house, Rigsby switches his allegiance to Labour.

=== Series 2 (1975) ===
No.	Title	Original release date	Prod. code	U.K. viewers (millions)
8	"The Permissive Society"	7 November 1975	201	N/A
Alan and Philip return from an unsuccessful double date. Alan tells Philip that he is a virgin, and Philip says that he first had sex on his 14th birthday as part of his coming-of-age initiation. Alan encourages Rigsby to pursue Miss Jones. Philip advises Alan to pursue her. Alan goes into her room to make a move on her, but Rigsby enters the room before she sees Alan, so Alan hides in her wardrobe. She rejects Rigsby's advances. Rigsby hears Alan, and Ruth opens the wardrobe door. Seeing Alan, she is surprised and Rigsby is angry. Cooper (George A. Cooper) he angry father of a girl whom Alan is dating comes to the boarding house, wanting to know how far she and Alan have gone sexually. Rigsby sends him off.
9	"Food Glorious Food"	14 November 1975	202	N/A
Philip wagers Rigsby £5 that he cannot fast for 48 hours. Philip gives him £5 for winning the bet, despite Rigsby having cheated by having eaten food which he thought was left for him by Alan - but was actually leftovers left by Philip for Vienna. Miss Jones takes Rigsby's winnings to give to famine relief, which she is collecting for.
10	"A Body Like Mine"	21 November 1975	203	N/A
Miss Jones and Alan decide to get into shape. Rigsby claims to be fit, but feels inadequate when he is unable to open a jar for Miss Jones, but Philip is. Rigsby starts improving his fitness, then challenges Philip to a boxing match. After Philip accepts his challenge, Rigsby is horrified to find out from Alan that Philip is a competent boxer. Miss Jones says that she will go out with the winner. Philip deliberately loses in order to avoid a date with Miss Jones. Rigsby strains his back whilst weight training, so he cannot go on the date. Philip goes on the date with Miss Jones.
11	"Moonlight and Roses"	28 November 1975	204	N/A
Miss Jones is dating Desmond (Robin Parkinson), a poetic librarian, and the couple become engaged. Philip advises Rigsby to compliment her, but she angrily rejects Rigsby, throwing flowers and water at him. Rigsby tries to scare Desmond off Miss Jones by falsely claiming that she is a violent alcoholic, but he still wants her. Alan invites Brenda to move in, claiming that it will be easy for him to convince Rigsby to let her do so. Rigsby tries the same lines on Brenda that he did on Miss Jones, after which the latter leaves.
12	"A Perfect Gentleman"	5 December 1975	205	7.05
New lodger Seymour (Henry McGee) preys on Rigsby's gullibility by conning him out of money by recommending he buys shares in an oil company which drills in the Pennines. Seymour tells Rigsby that he is inviting the mayor to the boarding house and asks Rigsby to give him money to buy champagne for dinner with the mayor. When Philip tells him that Seymour has left permanently, Rigsby realises that Seymour is a conman, that the mayor is not coming and that the shares he 'bought' on Seymour's recommendation do not exist.
13	"The Last of the Big Spenders"	12 December 1975	206	7.30
Rigsby buys new furniture to impress new lodger Brenda. His plan fails when the furniture is repossessed soon after.
14	"Things That Go Bump in the Night"	19 December 1975	207	7.25
Alan and Brenda return to the house from the cinema, where they saw Doctor Zhivago together. Rigsby tries to scare Alan with a ghost story about 'the Grey Lady'. At Philip's suggestion, Alan wears a dress in the house at night to pose as the Grey Lady to scare Rigsby. Rigsby believes it to be the Grey Lady and brings a vicar and curate to the house to exorcise the ghost. When Rigsby finds the dress that Alan wore, he wears it to pretend to be the Grey Lady, and is seen by the vicar (Norman Bird) and curate (David Rowlands), who angrily walk out.
15	"For the Man Who Has Everything"	26 December 1975	208	N/A
At Christmas, Rigsby is in the house on his own, as his lodgers are away. He is briefly visited by the milkman (Larry Martyn), then by the postwoman (Helen Fraser) - who delivers a card which Rigsby sent to himself. Alan and Brenda arrive, believing that Rigsby would be spending Christmas at his brother's house. Philip and Lucy (Elizabeth Adare) arrive. Rigsby fails in his attempts to kiss Brenda and Lucy.

=== Series 3 (1977) ===
No.	Title	Original release date	Prod. code	U.K. viewers (millions)
16	"That's My Boy"	12 April 1977	301	7.85
Alan let one of the rooms to Mrs. Brent (Ann Beach), a woman with a baby boy, David, whilst Rigsby was in Spain. After Rigsby returns, he wrongly assumes that David is Miss Jones'. The real father Jim Brent (David Daker), who is in the navy, arrives later.
17	"Stage Struck"	19 April 1977	302	8.40
Hilary (Peter Bowles), a camp playwright wants Rigsby to play the leading man in his play. Rigsby wrongly assumes the man to be gay, until he realises that he is trying to seduce Miss Jones.
18	"Clunk Click"	26 April 1977	303	8.45
Rigsby takes Miss Jones for a spin in his new car, scaring her by driving quickly. He wrongly believes that he has run over his cat, Vienna. Alan carries in Vienna alive and Ruth sees that it was her fur stole which Rigsby ran over.
19	"The Good Samaritans"	3 May 1977	304	8.25
A suicidal middle-aged man, Mr Gray (David Swift), moves in to the bed-sitter. He climbs onto the roof and Rigsby goes there to try to bring him down.
20	"Fawcett's Python"	10 May 1977	305	8.40
Rigsby disapproves of his new lodger Marilyn (Andonia Katsaros), an erotic dancer, because he initially wrongly assumes that she is a prostitute. He is relieved when he finds out that she is an erotic dancer, but concerned when she tells him that she has a pet snake.
21	"The Cocktail Hour"	17 May 1977	306	8.05
Rigsby is pleased that Alan has a posh new girlfriend, Caroline (Judy Buxton). However, when Caroline and her mother Mabel (Diana King) arrive, Rigsby is displeased by their snobbishness and tells Mabel that he remembers her when she was young and poor. Caroline and Mabel angrily leave.
22	"Suddenly at Home"	24 May 1977	307	8.20
A hypochondriac new lodger, Osborne (Roger Brierley), is convinced he is going to die. When Rigsby sees him unconscious, he wrongly assumes that he has died. The residents are shocked to see him alive.

=== Series 4 (1978) ===
No.	Title	Original release date	Prod. code	U.K. viewers (millions)
23	"Hello Young Lovers"	4 April 1978	401	18.20
Rigsby mistakes a courting couple, Robin (Alun Lewis) and Lorna (Deborah Watling), for newlyweds. Miss Jones phones the girl's father. He arrives, angry and horrified when he wrongly assumes that Rigsby is his daughter's partner. He then is shocked when he falsely assumes that Philip is the partner. When he meets Robin and realises the truth, he is very relieved and approves of Robin.
24	"Fire and Brimstone"	11 April 1978	402	18.55
Gwyn (John Clive), a Welsh theology student moves into the house and tries to convert Rigsby. However, he moves out after Miss Jones flirts with him.
25	"Great Expectations"	18 April 1978	403	18.25
Rigsby has been left money in his uncle's will, on the condition that he is happily married. His wife Veronica (Avis Bunnage) lives in Cleethorpes and he hates her, so he enlists Miss Jones to pose as his wife, but when Veronica arrives, she realises that Miss Jones is pretending to be her. Veronica pretends to be with him still. It is discovered that due to his uncle's debts, he will not be inheriting anything. Rigsby is disappointed, but pleased that his wife will not be receiving anything.
26	"Pink Carnations"	25 April 1978	404	17.80
Rigsby tells Philip that he has filed for divorce. Rigsby and Miss Jones advertise themselves in a newspaper's lonely hearts column, with dishonest descriptions of themselves. Unaware they have been set up with each other, they meet in a pub. After Rigsby sparks arguments due to mistaking two other women in the pub for his date, he and Miss Jones realise that they are each others' dates.
27	"Under the Influence"	2 May 1978	405	16.90
New lodger Ambrose (Peter Jeffrey) tries to hypnotise Philip, but instead hypnotises Rigsby. Miss Jones pranks Rigsby by pretending to be hypnotised, then Rigsby does likewise to her.
28	"Come on in, the Water's Lovely"	9 May 1978	406	15.10
Rigsby is delighted at receiving a letter informing him of his decree absolute, and tells Philip and Miss Jones. During dinner together at the house, Miss Jones accepts Rigsby's marriage proposal. On the day of the wedding, she changes her mind and does not turn up. Rigsby goes to the wrong church by mistake.
