= The Great McGonagall =

The Great McGonagall may refer to:

- William McGonagall, a Scottish poet often known by this name
- The Great McGonagall (film), a 1974 British comedy film about McGonagall
