= Rising Damp (film) =

1980 British comedy film by Joseph McGrath

- UK theatrical poster by Tom Beauvais
- Directed by: Joseph McGrath
- Screenplay by: Eric Chappell
- Based on: Rising Damp by Eric Chappell
- Produced by: Roy Skeggs
- Starring: Leonard Rossiter; Frances de la Tour; Don Warrington; Christopher Strauli
- Cinematography: Frank Watts
- Edited by: Peter Weatherly
- Music by: David Lindup
- Distributed by: ITC Entertainment (theatrical release); Acorn Media & ITV DVD (DVD-Video)
- Release date: 14 February 1980 (United Kingdom)
- Running time: 98 minutes
- Country: United Kingdom
- Budget: £400,000

Rising Damp is a 1980 British comedy film directed by Joseph McGrath, based on the British situation comedy Rising Damp, which aired on ITV from 1974 to 1978. The television series was, in turn, adapted from Eric Chappell's stage play The Banana Box. Chappell adapted the play to television, and wrote the screenplay for this feature film. The film stars Leonard Rossiter, Frances de la Tour, and Don Warrington, reprising their roles from the television series, with Christopher Strauli and Denholm Elliott.

== Plot ==
Rupert Rigsby, the middle-aged landlord of a decrepit townhouse, takes in a new tenant, art student John Harris. John is allocated the same room as medical student Philip Smith, who claims to be the son of an African chief. Rigsby has fallen for his only female tenant, Ruth Jones. Ruth, however, prefers Philip, who is much younger, more attractive, and more sophisticated than either Rigsby or she. Philip is not especially interested in Ruth and eggs Rigsby on in order to humiliate him, even going so far as to deliberately throw a boxing match against Rigby in which Ruth had agreed to go out with the winner. Rigsby's attempts to court Ruth constantly go awry; meanwhile, John earns the wrath of his girlfriend Sandra's father.

Charles Seymour, a conman with upper class affectations, courts Ruth in pursuit of her money. Though initially enamoured of his perceived social status, Rigsby becomes suspicious when Seymour consistently fails to pay his rent. Philip has the same suspicions regarding Seymour's true agenda and finally confronts him. With Rigsby eavesdropping on the conversation, Seymour threatens to expose Philip as a native Briton (rather than the African prince he has long claimed to be) if he reveals what he knows. Enraged, Rigsby appears from behind a door and unleashes a barrage of abuse on Seymour before finally throwing him out. Then calmer, Rigsby assures Philip he believes nothing of Seymour's story, and concludes that everything in Philip's demeanour suggests he is indeed descended from African royalty.

== Cast ==
- Leonard Rossiter as Rigsby
- Frances de la Tour as Miss Jones
- Don Warrington as Philip Smith
- Christopher Strauli as John Harris
- Denholm Elliott as Charles Seymour
- Carrie Jones as Sandra Cooper
- Glynn Edwards as Mr. Cooper
- John Cater as Bert
- Derek Griffiths as Alec
- Ronnie Brody as Italian waiter
- Alan Clare as accordionist
- Pat Roach as rugby player
- Jonathan Cecil as boutique assistant
- Bill Dean as workman

== Production ==
The sitcom Rising Damp, produced by Yorkshire Television for ITV, was originally broadcast over four series from 2 September 1974 until 9 May 1978, spanning 28 episodes. In the 1970s, film versions of British television comedies were not uncommon; programmes such as Till Death Us Do Part, Dad's Army, On the Buses, Monty Python's Flying Circus, Steptoe and Son, Nearest and Dearest, Bless This House, Father, Dear Father, The Lovers, Love Thy Neighbour, Man About the House, Are You Being Served?, Porridge, and George and Mildred all transitioned to the big screen. The idea for a film version of Rising Damp came from film and television producer Roy Skeggs. Eric Chappell, who created Rising Damp and wrote the entirety of the television series, was hired to write the film; assigned to direct was veteran comedy writer/director Joseph McGrath, who had directed Rising Damp star Leonard Rossiter in the ITV sitcom The Losers in 1978. McGrath stated, "I admired the series, but Leonard was such a forceful actor that I was worried about doing the film because of the strength and the power that he had exerted over the cast."

The film went into production in July 1979. In adapting Rising Damp to film, the setting was changed from Yorkshire to inner-city London. Richard Beckinsale, who appeared in the first three series of Rising Damp but was absent from the fourth due to theatre commitments, was intended to take part in the film. Beckinsale's death in March 1979 led to his character of Alan Moore being written out of the film and replaced by a new character, John Harris. The character of Alan is briefly referred to as having left Rigsby's house. The role of Seymour the conman, played by Henry McGee in an episode of the television series, was taken by Denholm Elliott in the film.

Joseph McGrath recalled,

I got on very well with Leonard Rossiter... [Richard Beckinsale] was supposed to be in the film, but he died. I liked Richard very much. In fact, it caused a load of trouble when he died in that Leonard didn't want to do the film, but eventually he said that he would do it. So we ended up with Christopher Strauli, who took Richard Beckinsale's place, at the suggestion of [Eric Chappell]. So, Christopher arrived and he felt a real outsider. I couldn't do anything about it even though I tried to... I kept comparing Christopher to Richard, in my mind, thinking, "Oh, God." And I think he'd got rather a rum-do. He felt it. He told me that during the filming he felt like a real outsider because he'd been suggested by the writer.

It was agreed that the film version of Rising Damp would adapt scenes and dialogue material from the television series. The film had a budget of approximately £400,000.00, which was relatively low for a film production but being higher than the budget allocated to the television series meant the film could be shot on location, rather than being entirely studio-bound as the series was. Joseph McGrath recalled,

I didn't find the shoot difficult. I made my mind up not to find it difficult. I made my mind up to be especially nice to the new actor, Christopher. About a week into the shoot, he asked if he could have lunch with me one day. I said, "Yes, sure." Then he confided that he felt a real outsider because the rest of the cast just left him alone... This was a week into the shoot... I found that the cast really liked Richard and they had every reason to like Richard. He was by far, apart from Leonard, the best actor of the cast, in an attitude of, if you started to talk to him about a scene, Richard was interested in why you were talking to him about that particular scene. Richard was an actor who had an intelligence about the part he was playing.

Writer Eric Chappell recalled,

I never watch the film because I didn't get paid for it! I cannibalised some of the scripts and wrote some new material, and they paid very little for it. I was in between doing other things. I always remember them taking me to a flash restaurant and saying, "Eric, we're not going to give you 3% but 5% of the profits!" Of course, what they're really saying is that they won't make any profits. If you're going to get a percentage, always get it on the gross. You get the producer's profit that he makes and that would be a lot of money. After that, there are all of these costs. By the time it comes to the writer, there's no money left. So, I've never had a penny out of that. I was on 5% of nothing! So, it always hurt my feelings.

The film dispenses with Dennis Wilson's piano-based theme music from the television series, featuring instead an upbeat disco theme song over its opening and closing titles.

== Critical reception ==
The Monthly Film Bulletin wrote: "Handicapped by the loss of its original co-star, the late Richard Beckinsale, Rising Damp also suffers from the customary problems of TV-to-film adaptations. Despite excursions into the world beyond, the film for the most part confines itself to the cramped location of Rigsby's shabby boarding-house, the definitive 'space' of the TV sit-com. Furthermore, the movie's running time overplays material which, even in the half-hour TV slots, has often seemed rather thinly developed. Denholm Elliott's urbane performance fails to buoy a sagging plot. The supporting players, however, as if aware of the difficulties and perhaps in response to Leonard Rossiter's overweening presence, give intelligently understated performances, and Don Warrington, as Philip, makes an enjoyably caustic onlooker."

A reviewer for Time Out wrote that the film "[demonstrates] that moderately droll TV boarding-house sitcoms ought not to be stretched to 98 minutes."

David Parkinson wrote in the Radio Times, "the absence of Richard Beckinsale does much to sap the enjoyment of this decent movie version of the enduring television sitcom. Eric Chappell...overwrites to compensate and the film suffers from too many padded scenes and too few hilarious situations. Newcomer Denholm Elliott looks a tad out of place alongside regulars Frances de la Tour and Don Warrington, but he makes a solid foil for the magnificent Leonard Rossiter, who pursues his romantic quest with a seedy chivalry that both disgusts and amuses."

For her performance as Ruth Jones, Frances da la Tour received an Evening Standard British Film Award in the category of "Best Actress".

== Relationship with the television series ==
The film version of Rising Damp resolves the issue of Philip's origins. For the entirety of the television series, Philip claims to be the son of an African tribal chief; the film reveals Philip is actually from Croydon, has never been to Africa, does not have ten wives, and adopted a false persona to start a new life and gain respect. This revelation is present in The Banana Box (the 1973 stage play from which Rising Damp was developed) but was never resolved in the television series. Regarding the revelation of Philip's African prince persona being a fabrication, Eric Chappell stated, "I think I put it in the film because I was desperate for a climax and a finish." Don Warrington, who played Philip, stated, "I was taken by the idea that, in order to have an effect on other people, Philip had created for himself an exotic identity – being the son of an African chief. It was only in the 1980 film adaptation that the truth was finally revealed: he is in fact born and bred in Croydon. Somebody pretending to be something they were not was a window into Philip's level of insecurity as a human being."

However, the film does not appear to inhabit the same continuity as the television series. In the film, Rigsby's townhouse is in inner-city London (in the series the townhouse is in Yorkshire); Philip is a medical student (rather than the planning student he is in the series); and much of the development of Rigsby and Ruth's relationship (including Rigsby's marriage proposal to Ruth in the final episode of series four) is ignored.

Furthermore, the film reuses plotlines, scenes, and dialogue from the series, including Seymour the conman/thief (from series two's "A Perfect Gentleman"); Rigsby's boxing match with Philip (from series two's "A Body Like Mine"); the male earring, the pills, and the burning of "love wood" (from series one's "Charisma"); a girlfriend's overprotective father on the warpath (from series two's "The Permissive Society"); Rigsby taking Ruth for a spin in his sports car (from series three's "Clunk Click"); and Rigsby revealing his first name (Rupert) to Ruth (from series four's "Great Expectations"). The film can therefore be regarded as a "best of" compilation of situations and lines from the television series, rather than a narrative continuation.
