= Harold Innocent =

English actor (1933–1993)

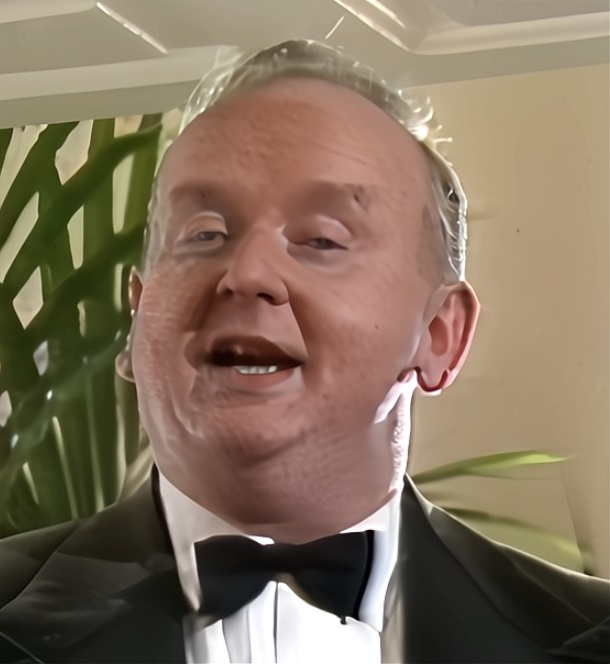
- Innocent performing in The Green Tie on the Little Yellow Dog (1983)
- Born: 12 September 1933; Coventry, Warwickshire, England
- Died: 12 September 1993 (aged 60); London, England
- Occupation: Actor
- Years active: 1959–1993

Harold Sidney Innocent (18 April 1933 – 12 September 1993) was an English actor who appeared in many film and television roles.

After attending Broad Street Secondary Modern School in Coventry, Innocent worked for a short time as an office clerk. Realising quickly that he was not suited to this career, he turned instead to acting, studying at the Birmingham School of Speech Training and Dramatic Art. After National Service in the RAF, Innocent went into repertory theatre. Later he moved to Hollywood where he appeared in Alfred Hitchcock Presents in 1959, as well other television series such as The Barbara Stanwyck Show.

On his return to the United Kingdom he appeared at the Nottingham Playhouse, the Royal Lyceum Theatre in Edinburgh, the Young Vic, the National Theatre, the Royal Shakespeare Company and the Bristol Old Vic. In 1984 with the RSC he appeared in Richard III and Love's Labour's Lost. With the same company he appeared in Henry V, playing both the Archbishop of Canterbury and the Duke of Burgundy. He played the latter role in the 1989 film version for Kenneth Branagh. In 1991 he appeared in Alan Bennett's The Madness of George III, again at the National Theatre.

Innocent's television appearances include the 1969 pilot episode of Randall and Hopkirk (Deceased), The Persuaders!, My Late Lamented Friend and Partner as well as Callan, Crown Court, The Professionals, Minder, Inspector Morse, the Bursar in Porterhouse Blue, EastEnders and as Lord Robert "Bunchy" Gospell in episode 6 ("Death in a White Tie") of the Inspector Alleyn Mysteries. Maigret and the Mad Woman, as Pepito Giovanni. In Porterhouse Blue (1987) he appeared alongside David Jason as the college Bursar. He appeared singing comic monologues and songs alongside Cilla Black in The Green Tie on the Little Yellow Dog, which was recorded 1982, and broadcast by Channel 4 in 1983.

In the late Sixties, whilst living in California, he was a member of the Pacifica Players ensemble of actors working at KPFK and in 1968 recorded the first unabridged reading of The Hobbit, by J.R.R. Tolkien.

His film roles included Loot (1970), Brazil (1984), Henry V (1989) and Robin Hood: Prince of Thieves (1991). On stage he appeared in a musical version of Alice in Wonderland at the Lyric Theatre in Hammersmith in 1986, and made his operatic debut in Gilbert and Sullivan's Ruddigore for a centenary performance in 1987 at Sadler's Wells.

He appeared in the Doctor Who serial The Happiness Patrol as Gilbert M, and later the BBC Radio 5 drama serial The Paradise of Death.

Innocent died after a short illness in London, on 12 September 1993, aged 60.

== Partial filmography ==
Year	Title	Role	Notes
1960	Alfred Hitchcock Presents	Vicar	Season 5 Episode 35: "The Schartz-Metterklume Method" (uncredited)
1962	The Notorious Landlady	Young Escort	Uncredited
1962	Gunsmoke	Mr. Botkin, Banker	"Coventry" (S7E24)
1970	Every Home Should Have One	Jimpson	
1970	Loot	Bank Manager	
1973	Yellow Dog	Marceau	
1975	Galileo	Second Secretary-Informer	
1984	The Case of Marcel Duchamp	Talou VII, Emperor of Ponukele and King of Drelshkaf	
1985	Brazil	Interview Official #2	
1986	God's Outlaw	Doctor	
1987	Little Dorrit	Mr. Rugg, Legal Advisor	
1988	Buster	Justice Parry	
1988	Without a Clue	Mayor Johnson	
1989	The Tall Guy	Timothy	
1989	Try This One for Size	Kendrick	
1989	Henry V	Duke Philippe of Burgundy	
1991	Robin Hood: Prince of Thieves	Bishop of Hereford	
