= The Green Tie on the Little Yellow Dog =

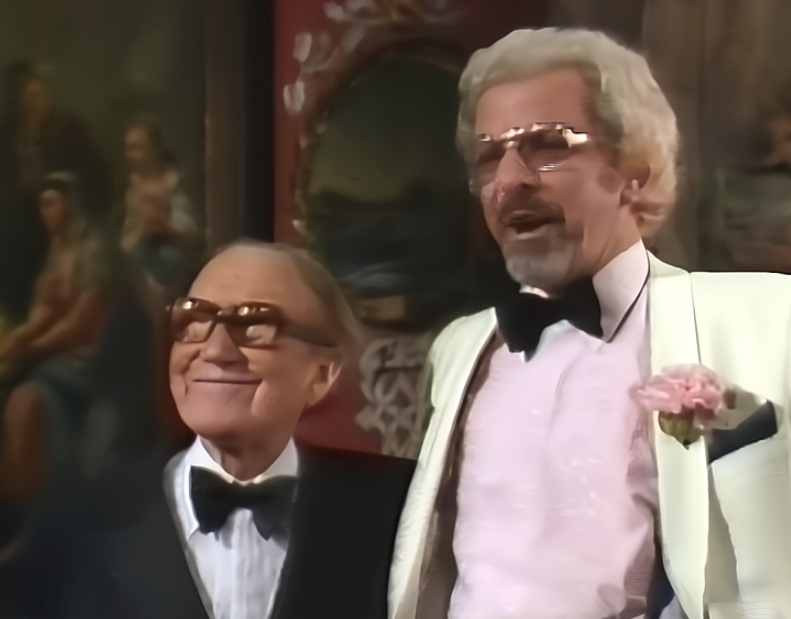
- Arthur Askey and Barry Cryer
- Genre: Comedy
- Directed by: Bryan Izzard

Production
- Producer: Neil Anthony
- Production company: The Bright Thoughts Company

Original release
- Network: Channel 4
- Release: 10 July 1983

The Green Tie on the Little Yellow Dog is a three-part British television series that aired on Channel 4 in July 1983. It featured monologues, songs and sketches that had been popularised during the era of music hall, which were performed by a large cast, including Leonard Rossiter, Cilla Black and Julie Walters. It included the last professional engagement of veteran performer Arthur Askey, and was the first occasion where Maureen Lipman performed as Joyce Grenfell.

== Production ==
Hosted by the British comedian Barry Cryer, the show was recorded in the summer of 1982 at the Foundling Museum in London and made and devised by The Bright Thoughts Company The program's title was taken from the 1920s monologue The Green Tie on the Little Yellow Dog, by Scottish comedian Billy Bennett. Pianist Kenny Clayton accompanied the performers, who also served as their own audience around a large dining table.

Performances in the programme included:

- Arthur Askey: The Bee Song; The Villain Still Pursued Her
- Julie Walters: The Charge of the Tight Brigade; Old Sam; Neil
- Maureen Lipman: The Committee by Joyce Grenfell; Maud; The Girl at the Station
- Cilla Black: The Green Tie on the Little Yellow Dog; Walter, Walter; Heaven Will Protect an Honest Girl.
- Leonard Rossiter: The Devil May Care; Three Ha'pence a Foot
- Richard O'Callaghan: Tommy Out East; The Village Constable
- Alec McCowen: My Old Dutch; The Future Mrs Hawkins
- Ronald Lacey: My Fiddle is My Sweetheart; The Street Watchman's Story; Orange Blossom
- Diane Langton: Brahn Boots; The Grand Old Girls of Britain
- Harold Innocent: The Green Eye of the Yellow God; If You'll Pardon My Saying So
- Barry Cryer: My Word,You Do Look Queer; The Voyage of the Saucy Jane

== Reception ==
Ned Sherrin, writing in The Listener, singled out the performances of Alec McCowen and Julie Walters, who he said managed to "bring freshness to Stanley Holloway's saga of Sam and his musket". Sherrin offered the most praise for Arthur Askey, and commented that "his final sentence was addressed in a confidential aside to the camera, buttonholing the audience confidently to remind us that he was the first comedian ever to do that". Benny Green reviewed the series for Punch, and described Diane Langton's rendition of Brahn Boots as "affectingly faultless". He also showered praise on Cilla Black's version of Walter, Walter, commenting that it was performed with "faultless judgment, masterly execution, suggesting to at least one viewer that so far in pursuing her career Miss Black has been drawing on no more than one tenth of her considerable talent". In an overview article published in British Comedy Guide in 2022, Rob Brown wrote that "with all the cast dressed in formal attire appropriate for a sophisticated dinner party of the 1920s, the results were simply wondrous, and, in hindsight, mark a moment of transition in British comedy: a symbolic handing of the baton to a new generation of comic talent".

== Gallery ==
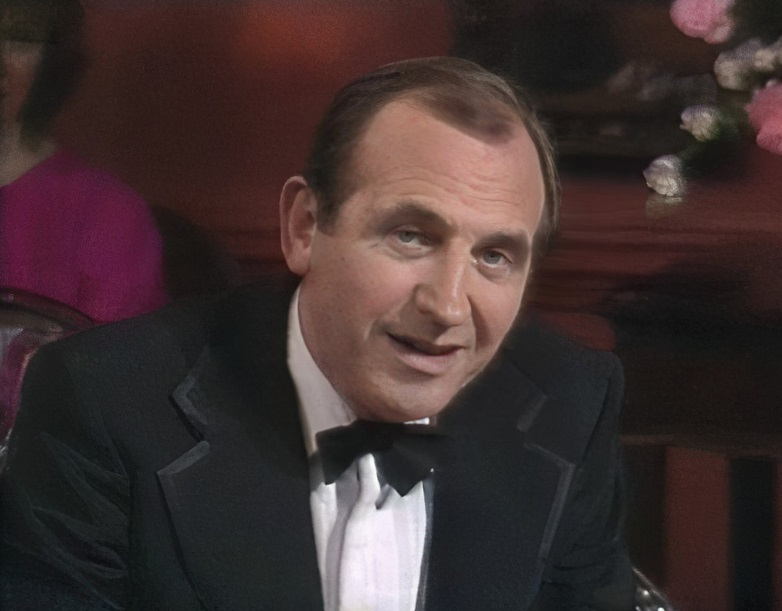
Leonard Rossiter

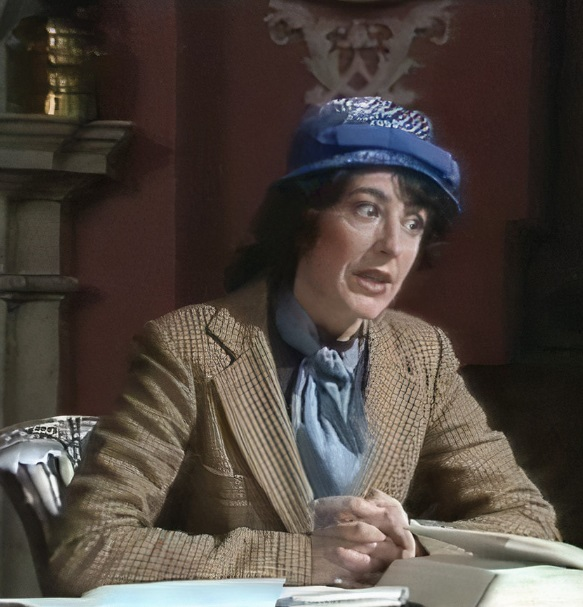
Maureen Lipman

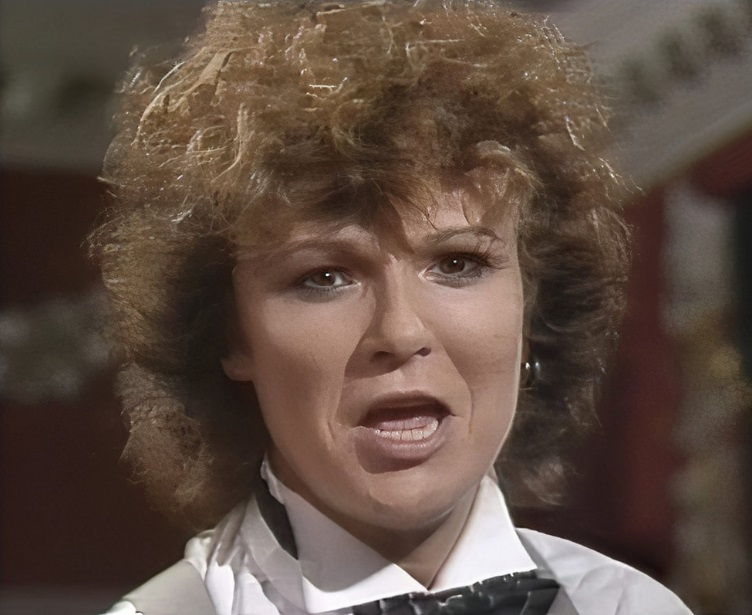
Julie Walters

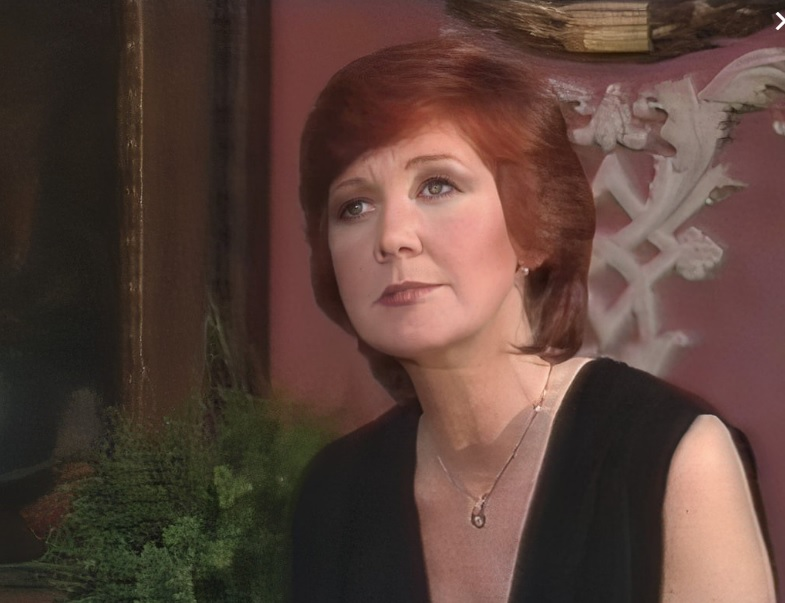
Cilla Black

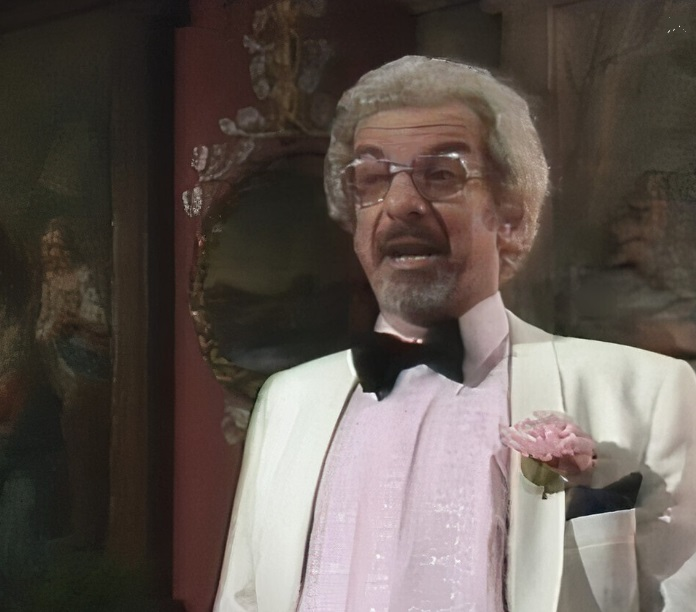
Barry Cryer

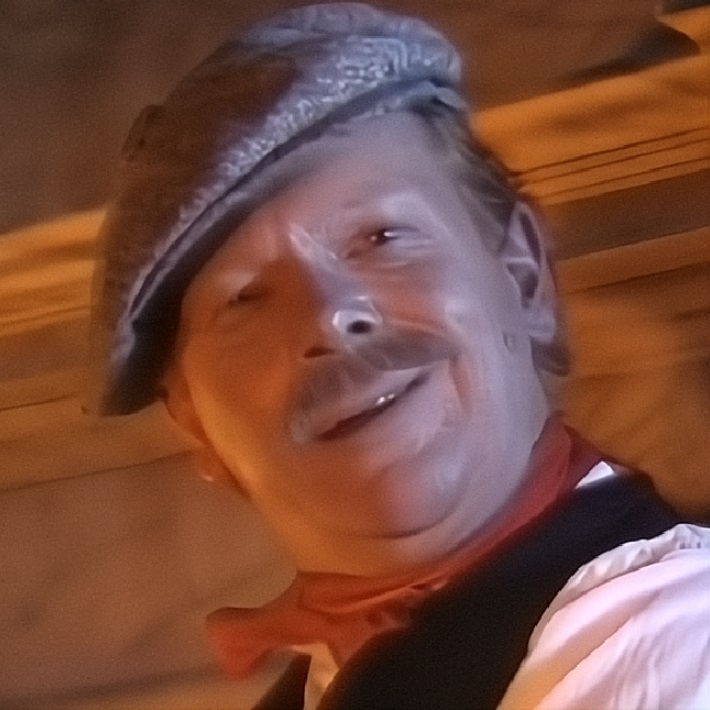
Ronald Lacey

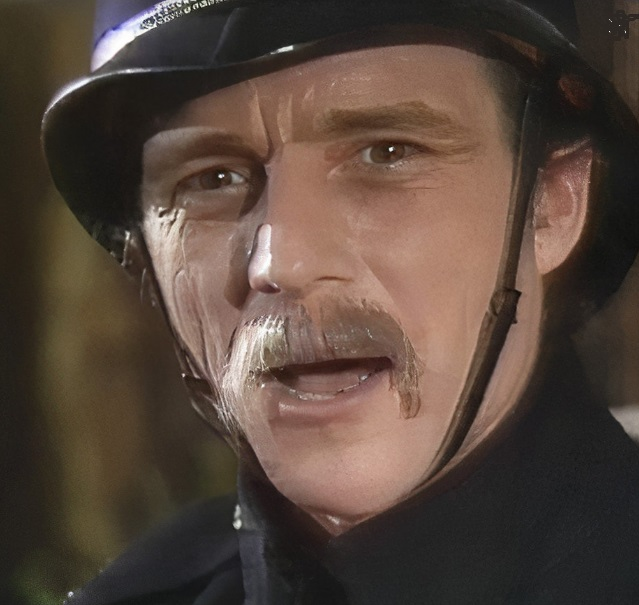
Richard O'Callaghan

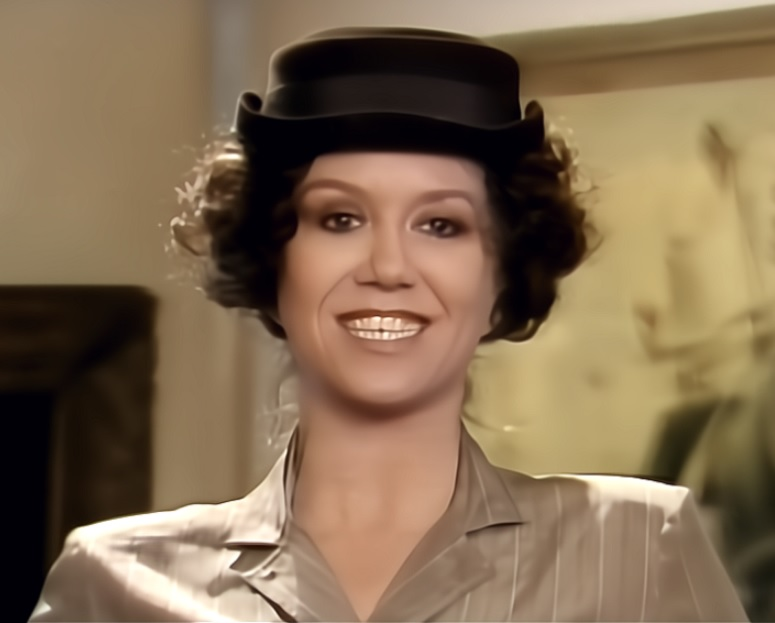
Diane Langton

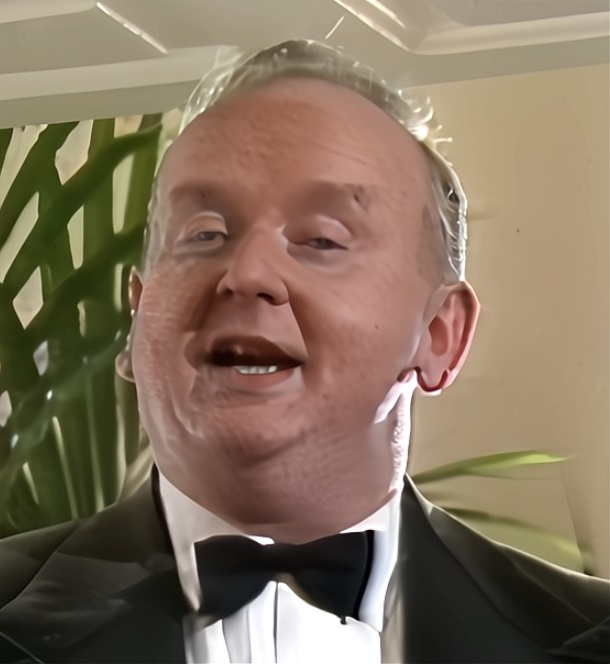
Harold Innocent
