= Rising Damp =

British TV sitcom (1974–1978)

- Opening title (Series 1)
- Genre: Sitcom
- Created by: Eric Chappell
- Starring: Leonard Rossiter; Frances de la Tour; Richard Beckinsale; Don Warrington; Gabrielle Rose
- Theme music composer: Dennis Wilson
- Country of origin: United Kingdom
- Original language: English
- No. of series: 4
- No. of episodes: 28 (list of episodes)

Production
- Running time: 22–24 minutes
- Production company: Yorkshire Television

Original release
- Network: ITV
- Release: 2 September 1974 – 9 May 1978

Rising Damp is a British sitcom, written by Eric Chappell and produced by Yorkshire Television for ITV, which was originally broadcast from 2 September 1974 until 9 May 1978. Chappell adapted the story from his 1973 stage play The Banana Box. The programme ran for four series and a spin-off feature film of the same name was released in 1980. The series won the 1978 BAFTA for Best Situation Comedy. Rising Damp was the highest-ranking ITV sitcom in the BBC's 100 Best Sitcoms poll of 2004, coming in 27th overall.

== Premise ==
Rising Damp starred Leonard Rossiter, Frances de la Tour, Richard Beckinsale and Don Warrington. Rossiter played Rupert Rigsby (originally Rooksby in the stage play), the miserly, seedy, and ludicrously self-regarding landlord of a run-down Victorian townhouse who rents out his shabby bedsits to a variety of tenants. Beckinsale played Alan Moore, a long-haired, naive, good-natured and amiable medical student who occupies the top room. Frances de la Tour played Ruth Jones, a fey, whimsical spinster and college administrator who rents another room, is approaching middle age, and with whom Rigsby is in love.

In the pilot episode, a new tenant arrives. Philip Smith (Don Warrington) is a planning student who claims to be the son of an African chief. As a black man, he brings out the ill-informed fears and knee-jerk suspicions of Rigsby. However, the landlord quickly accepts his new tenant and henceforth regards him with a wary respect; wary because of Philip's intelligence and smooth manners, and especially because Miss Jones finds herself attracted to the handsome sophisticate.

Of these four principal actors, only Beckinsale was a new recruit – the others had all played their roles in the original stage play. Beckinsale stated that he had originally been approached to appear in the play but was unavailable, so when the part in the television series later came up, he "jumped at the chance of playing Alan."

In the first series, there was another tenant, Spooner, a professional wrestler, played by Derek Newark. Rigsby gets on his bad side when he and Alan 'borrow' his clothes in the episode "A Night Out." Spooner made only two appearances but is mentioned in other episodes in Series 1. Other tenants occasionally move into the house but never became permanent residents, often appearing only in a single episode. Peter Bowles and Peter Jeffrey were among the actors portraying these tenants.

Frances de la Tour temporarily left the series in 1975, after appearing in four episodes of the second series, because of theatre commitments. She was replaced by Gabrielle Rose for three episodes as new tenant Brenda (she also appeared in la Tour's last episode of 1975 "Moonlight and Roses"), whilst Henry McGee also stood in for one episode as new tenant and conman Seymour. Frances de la Tour returned for the final two series.

Richard Beckinsale did not appear in the fourth series due to West End theatre commitments. Eric Chappell wrote some lines into the intended first episode "Fire and Brimstone" to explain Alan's absence (he had passed his exams to become a doctor) but these were cut when it was decided to broadcast the second episode "Hello Young Lovers" as the first episode instead.

Eric Chappell defended Rigsby by saying he "was not a racist or a bigot, but he was prejudiced and suspicious of strangers. But he accepted Philip and his only concern afterwards was that he didn't get a leg over Miss Jones." Don Warrington stated: "There were certain aspects of it that were politically incorrect. On the other, you can see how it held up a mirror to the way we were living."

=== Setting ===
The setting is a rundown Victorian townhouse let out as bedsits in Yorkshire; rising damp was a notorious issue in low-quality rented accommodation. The exact setting is not explicitly stated although it is implied to be Leeds, through references to Leeds United, Yorkshire Traction, the M62 and the Corn Exchange. The show was recorded entirely before a studio audience at The Leeds Studios of Yorkshire Television in Leeds and featured no scenes shot on location. The film, however, is set in and was filmed in London.

=== Emphasis on personal failure ===
The programme depicts closely the failing lives of three of the four main characters. Rigsby is longtime separated from his wife and has since become a seedy, ignorant man who is suspicious of anyone different from himself. Miss Jones is an unhappy spinster who is shown to be desperate for male attention (even willing, in effect, to pay for it). Alan is a medical student with a somewhat plodding intellect, socially inept and who remains a virgin throughout much of the series, despite appearing to be in his mid 20s. Philip, by contrast, is a relatively learned and emotionally intelligent man, who responds to Rigsby's ignorance with a kind of ironic complicity, as expressed through lies reminiscing about his African life full of magic, violence and sexual promiscuity, often resulting in Rigsby making a fool of himself through his gullible willingness to believe these stories.

== Characters ==
Main cast of Rising Damp: (from left) Frances de la Tour, Leonard Rossiter, Richard Beckinsale and Don Warrington

=== Rupert Rigsby ===
The landlord of the house, Rupert Rigsby (Leonard Rossiter) is dour, interfering and tight fisted. He has strong right-wing views which are adopted without morals or reason. For example, in the film adaptation he states that hanging should be reinstated "but this time in public". Rigsby is an old-fashioned "colonial type" with prejudiced views. He is suspicious of anything beyond his parochial sphere of interest and, most particularly of Philip, who is suave, intelligent, well-spoken, and black. He is also jealous of Philip because he is enigmatic, adroit, charismatic, and educated, all that Rigsby aspires to be but is not. Rigsby is an ardent patriot, believing himself to be an illegitimate member of the British royal family. He also makes exaggerated and romanticised references to his military service during World War II, frequently referring to "a bit of trouble with the old shrapnel" and fighting at the Battle of Dunkirk: "I haven't seen fear like that since Dunkirk". He also refers to seeing action at the Battle of Anzio and being in Africa during the Second World War. Rigsby is also a tremendous snob, obsessed with being perceived as middle class. He often affects an "old school tie" attitude – another of his fantasies. While Rigsby tries to flirt with the upper classes, when they invariably reject him, he distances himself, declaring himself to be a "self-made man" and calling the prospective Conservative candidate an "upper-class twit" after he refers to Rigbsy's lodging house as the "unacceptable face of capitalism" and accuses Rigsby of having cheated at billiards in the local Conservative club.

Seedy and furtive, Rigsby has poor interpersonal skills. His professed love of Miss Jones is mostly sexual. She rejects him due to him being married, until his marriage ends, and Miss Jones accepts his proposal.

As he pries and spies upon his tenants, Rigsby often carries Vienna, his large, fluffy, long-haired, black-and-white tomcat. Rigsby's amiable pet, and confidant, is so named because, as Rigsby tells it, when he goes to put him out on a cold dark night, "if there is another set of eyes out there, then it's Good Night, Vienna".

Rigsby was known by his surname only for almost the entirety of Rising Damp; his first name (Rupert) was revealed in the third episode of the fourth series. Several members of Rigsby's family - his estranged wife Veronica (Avis Bunnage), his Aunt Maud (Gretchen Franklin) and his shifty brother Ron - make guest appearances in the fourth series.

=== Ruth Jones ===
Miss Jones (Frances de la Tour) is a middle-aged spinster. A college administrator and well-educated, she is a dauntless romantic; like Rigsby, Miss Jones has pretensions, believing herself to be a sophisticated aesthete worthy of more satisfaction from her life. The comedy uses pathos to touch upon her frustration and disappointment; in one episode she gives money to a man she has romantic interest in, knowing full well he is conning her, but craving romantic attention to a point where she is willing to effectively pay him for it. The only male attention she has is from Rigsby, to which she is intermittently susceptible, though mostly finding his approaches an annoyance, for besides being of sexual interest, Rigsby sees Miss Jones as an upper-middle-class sophisticate and any courtship would be a social as well as sexual conquest. However, Miss Jones openly desires Philip, frequently cooking for him and inviting his company in her room, much to the annoyance and frustration of Rigsby. Unfortunately for her, this interest is not reciprocated although she finds solace in Philip's superior intellect and good manners, and the two appear to be friends. De La Tour had in fact only just turned 30 years old when the first series was filmed in the summer of 1974.

=== Alan Moore ===
Alan George Moore (Richard Beckinsale) is a likeable young medical student. Rigsby treats him with mistrust, mainly because of Alan's permissive, left-wing views. Alan has little luck with girlfriends but is content with his life. Alan hails from a middle-class family and appreciates music and arts. Although Alan is academically successful, socially he is somewhat inept, appearing to have few friends outside of the lodging house. Alan occasionally confides his problems in Rigsby, who is always unsympathetic. On one occasion however, Alan is defended by Rigsby, when the incandescent father of Sandra, one of his girlfriends, suspects the two of them have been having sex, Rigsby sends the man out of the house with a "flea in his ear", defending Alan, apparently because Rigsby was offended the man assumed Rigsby to be Alan's father. Alan is immature and Rigsby does become something of a strange father figure for him.

Alan did not appear in the last series due to Richard Beckinsale's other acting commitments.

=== Philip Smith ===
Philip Smith (Don Warrington) is a second-generation British African from Croydon, although for all of the series he claims to be an "African Prince" and the son of an African tribal chief. Philip's lies about his "primitive" background seem most obviously an ironic response to Rigsby's ignorant remarks, and sometimes result in moments when Rigsby's gullibility and desperation lead to his belief in some aspect of Philip's lore: for example, the "love wood" which fails to excite Miss Jones. Philip is an intelligent, educated man (more so than the moderately educated Alan and Miss Jones), he is sophisticated and suave; this makes Rigsby suspicious of him, particularly as Miss Jones openly fancies him. Philip does not reciprocate Miss Jones's romantic interest. Warrington told The Telegraph in 2013: "The difficulty for Rigsby lies in observing somebody who is exactly who he would like to be – apart from the fact that he is black – and that’s very confusing for him."

Croydon was not revealed to be the true birthplace of Philip until the film version of Rising Damp (1980). Warrington commented in Britain's 50 Best Sitcoms on Channel 4, that this fact was planned to be a plot development in the TV series, but the death of Richard Beckinsale meant this was not possible. In fact, in the film when Phillip informed Rigsby of the fact that he was not an African Prince, Rigsby dismissed that cheerfully and said that there "could have been royalty somewhere" in his heritage.

== Film ==
A feature film version was released in 1980, reusing several storylines from the television series. As Richard Beckinsale had died the year before, Christopher Strauli was cast as a new character, art student John. The character of Alan is briefly referenced, as having left. The film's theme song features lyrics by Eric Chappell and was released as a 7" single. The B-side features comedy dialogue between Rigsby and Miss Jones.

Philip is revealed not to be a chief's son from Africa, but from Croydon, adopting his false persona to start a new life and gain respect. When Rigsby finds out, he tells Philip that he believes he must have some royal ancestry and he does not tell the rest of the characters about his deception. This plotline is from the original stage play The Banana Box.

== Repeats, DVD and scripts ==
The series has been repeated frequently in the UK, appearing on ITV, The Family Channel (1993–96), Channel 4 (1998-2004), UK Gold (1997–98), Plus (2001–03) (formerly Granada Plus/G Plus), ITV3, and, since 2024, That's TV.

The series aired in the United States and Canada on A&E from 1991–1992. It also aired on the US version of the network prior to that, in the mid-1980s.

The complete series has been released on Region 2 DVD under the Granada Media, Cinema Club and ITV DVD labels; from 2006 to 2008, Acorn Media released it on region 1 DVD in North American markets. On screen episode titles have been added to the Region 2 DVD versions of series 1 & 2. The episode titles on series 3 & 4 are however original. Also, the Region 1 releases are the only ones to retain the Yorkshire Television Colour Production frontcaps/endboards, as well as the "end of part one" and "part two" ad-break captions. All of these presentation elements are edited out of the Region 2 releases.

During the 2016 Easter holiday, the entire series and film were shown on ITV3, accompanied by a brand new two-part documentary, Rising Damp Forever, featuring cast and crew recollections on the making of the show.

In November 2020, all four series of the show were made available for streaming in the UK, US and Canada via the online digital subscription service BritBox.

In 2025, the series was available for streaming in Canada on Tubi TV.

A guide to the show called Rising Damp: A Celebration was written by Richard Webber and published in 2001. The book features a history of the show's development, along with an episode guide, interviews, and profiles of the people who worked on the show.

The complete scripts for the series were published by Granada Media Group in the 2002 book Rising Damp: The Complete Scripts. This collection does not include the feature film version. In his introduction, Eric Chappell writes: "When I decided to publish the scripts of Rising Damp my first thought was, did I have them all? What followed was a desperate search in the loft amongst piles of mildewed papers until I found them.… The scripts were written in feverish haste by someone who didn’t really know what he was doing, and who was finding things out as he went along. I didn’t admit this at the time, even to myself. I took the view that sitcom writers fell into two categories: the quick and the dead, and I didn’t intend to be one of the latter!"

In 2005, as part of ITV's 50th anniversary celebration, Rising Damp was one of six shows chosen to be represented on a Royal Mail postage stamp.

== Home releases ==
| DVD title | Country of Release | Region | Date of Release | DVD company | Catalog number | Notes |
All DVD releases are single disc, unless otherwise indicated.
| Rising Damp – The Complete First Series | United Kingdom | 2 | 7 May 2001 | Granada Media | | |
| The Very Best of Rising Damp | United Kingdom | 2 | 16 September 2002 | Cinema Club | | Compilation Release |
| Rising Damp – The Movie | Australia | 4 | 17 February 2003 | Umbrella | | |
| Rising Damp – The Works | United Kingdom | 2 | 14 June 2004 | Cinema Club | | 4-disc set of series 1–4; Missing Christmas episode. |
| Rising Damp – The Movie | United Kingdom | 2 | 15 November 2004 | ITV DVD | | |
| Rising Damp – The Complete TV Series PLUS the Movie | United Kingdom | 2 | 21 November 2005 | ITV DVD | 37115 20253 | 5-disc set of the complete series (including Christmas episode) plus the movie |
| Rising Damp – Series 1 | United States | 1 | 10 January 2006 | Acorn Media | | |
| Rising Damp – Series 1 & 2 | Australia | 4 | 28 July 2007 | Acmec Records | ACMEC075 | 2 Disc set. |
| Rising Damp – Series 1 & 2 | Australia | 4 | 5 July 2012 | Roadshow Entertainment | R-112820-9 | 2 Disc set. |
| Rising Damp – Series 2 | United States | 1 | 6 June 2006 | Acorn Media | | |
| Rising Damp – Series 3 | United States | 1 | 16 January 2007 | Acorn Media | | |
| Rising Damp – Series 3 & 4 | Australia | 4 | 24 April 2008 | Acmec Records | ACMEC080 | 2 Disc set. |
| Rising Damp – Series 3 & 4 | Australia | 4 | 6 February 2013 | Roadshow Entertainment | R-113401-9 | 2 Disc set. |
| Rising Damp – Series 4 | United States | 1 | 17 July 2007 | Acorn Media | | |
| Rising Damp – The Movie | United States | 1 | 15 January 2008 | Acorn Media | | |
| Rising Damp – The Complete Series | United Kingdom | 2 | 1 September 2008 | ITV DVD | 37115 29413 | 5-disc set of all four series including Christmas episode plus the 1980 Film version |

This includes the film version, since Carlton had acquired the rights to the film, and through the mergers of the various ITV companies Granada Television subsequently acquired the rights to both the Carlton and Yorkshire Television archives.

== See also ==
- British sitcom
- List of films based on British comedy series
