= Diane Langton =

English actress (1944–2025)

- Langton as Nana McQueen on Hollyoaks
- Born: Diane Shirley Maria Langton; 31 May 1944; Cranmore, Somerset, England
- Died: 15 January 2025 (aged 80); Hampshire, England
- Occupations: Actress; singer; dancer
- Years active: 1959–2024
- Notable work: The Rag Trade; Only Fools and Horses; Heartbeat; EastEnders; Hollyoaks
- Spouse(s): Alan Cooper (m. 1963, divorced) Derek James (m. 1976)
- Children: 1

Diane Shirley Maria Langton (31 May 1944 (Note: Though it was originally reported that she was 77 at the time of her death, her obituary on the Guardian confirms that she was 80.) – 15 January 2025) was a British actress, singer and dancer whose career on stage and screen spanned six decades. After beginning her career in theatre, she went on to appear in television shows, portraying roles such as Kathy Roberts in The Rag Trade and June Snell in Only Fools and Horses, Ruby Rowan in Heartbeat and Bev Williams in EastEnders. Her most notable role, however, was her portrayal of Marlena "Nana" McQueen in the Channel 4 soap opera Hollyoaks, which she played sporadically between 2007 to 2009 and from 2012 until her death.

== Early life ==
Diane Shirley Maria Langton was born on 31 May 1944 in Cranmore, Somerset, and grew up in Fulham, London. She was the daughter of William Langton, a merchant seaman, and his wife Bridie (née Monahan). Langton began her career as a dancer with several ballet companies on European tours, and trained at the Corona Academy in Hammersmith.

== Career ==
Langton's first credited role was as a schoolgirl in the comedy film Carry On Teacher, she subsequently embarked on her career in theatre, starting with an appearance in the musical Hair in 1968. She played Private Alice Easy in the 1976 film Carry On England. She went on to appear in television shows throughout the 1970's, most notably her role in The Rag Trade as Kathy Roberts in 1975, and again from 1977 to 1978. She appeared in various West End musicals, including A Chorus Line, A Little Night Music, Chicago and Mary Poppins. In September 1979, Langton's debut solo single, "Climbin'", was released on vinyl via Pye Records. In 1982, she appeared in the Royal Variety Performance, performing a song from Show Boat.

Langton appeared in The Green Tie on the Little Yellow Dog, which was recorded in 1982, and broadcast by Channel 4 in 1983. Between 1985 and 1986, she appeared in Only Fools and Horses as June Snell, a former girlfriend of Del Boy. In 1987, she created the role of Angel in Kander & Ebb's The Rink at the Forum Theatre in Manchester, a role which she reprised in the 1988 West End transfer. She returned to the musical in 2004, at the Belgrade Theatre in Coventry, this time playing the role of Angel's mother, Anna. Her other notable television appearances included Alas Smith and Jones, Bergerac, Minder, Carry On Laughing and The Bill.

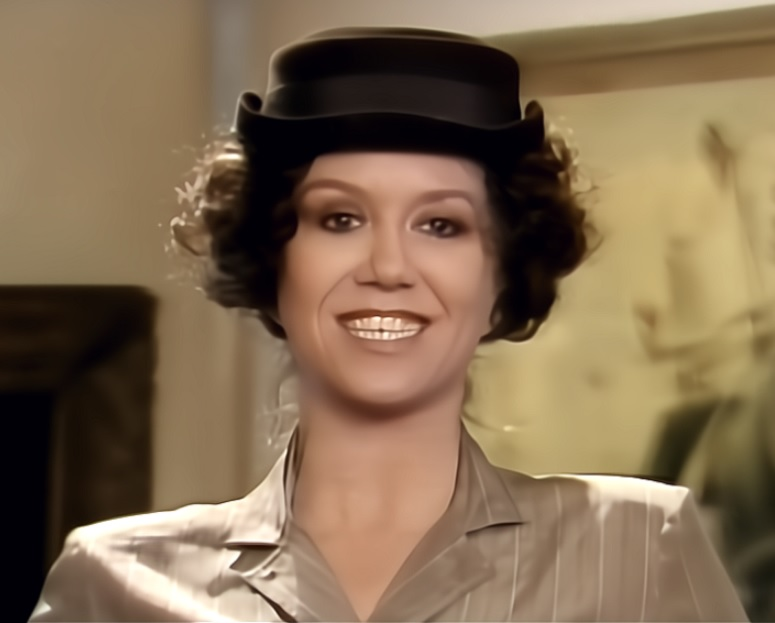
Langton performing in The Green Tie on the Little Yellow Dog

Between 1995 and 1997, Langton appeared in Heartbeat as Ruby Rowan, Nick Berry's character's mother, and as a prostitute in an episode of Joking Apart. Between 1998 and 1999, she appeared in EastEnders as Cindy Beale's (Michelle Collins) mother, Bev Williams. She also appeared in the London cast of Billy Elliot as Grandma and fronted her own one woman show Let There Be Langton. In 2007, she began portraying the role of Marlena "Nana" McQueen on the Channel 4 soap opera Hollyoaks, a role she played sporadically over the next seventeen years, making her final appearance on 30 December 2024.

== Personal life and death ==
Langton was married twice. Her first marriage to Alan Cooper in 1963, a painter and decorator, subsequently ended in divorce. Together they had a son, Jamie (born 1964). In 1976, Langton married Derek James, whom she met whilst performing in a national tour of the musical Hair. Langton lived in East Hampshire, near the village of Bordon.

Langton died from kidney disease on 15 January 2025, at the age of 80. Tributes were paid to her from the Hollyoaks social media accounts who described Langton as an "immense talent" who would be "[missed] enormously" by the show's cast and crew. Several of her co-stars also paid tribute including Chelsee Healey, Anna Passey, and James Sutton, the latter of whom said his "heart was broken" and thanked Langton for her "love, kindness, generosity, warmth, friendship, humour and care".

== Filmography ==
=== Television and film ===
Year	Title	Role	Notes
1959	Carry On Teacher	Schoolgirl	Film; uncredited
1974	Don't Just Lie There, Say Something!	Angie	Film
1974	Percy's Progress	Maureen Sugden	Film
1975	Carry On Laughing	Tzana; Griselda; Isolde	3 episodes
1975	Eskimo Nell	Gladys Armitage	Film
1975	Confessions of a Pop Performer	Ruby Climax	Film
1975, 1977–1978	The Rag Trade	Kathy	Main role
1976	Trial by Combat	Ruby	Film
1976	Carry On England	Private Alice Easy	Film
1979	She Loves Me	Ilona Ritter	Television film
1980	The Trevor Baker All Weather Show	Herself	sings 'Soon It's Going To Rain'
1981	The End of the End of the Pier Show	Mrs. Channing	Television film
1982	Minder	Rita	Episode: "In"
1985–1986	Only Fools and Horses	June Snell	Episodes: "Happy Returns" and "A Royal Flush"
1987	Alas Smith and Jones	Mum	Episode: "The Homemade Xmas Video"
1989	Streets Apart	Rene	4 episodes
1989	The Cook, the Thief, His Wife & Her Lover	May Fitch	Film
1990	Bergerac	Dawn Gray	Episode: "All the Sad Songs"
1990–1991	The Les Dennis Laughter Show	Unknown	3 episodes
1990	Boon	Sylvia Clayborough	Episode: "Rival Eyes"
1991	Tonight at 8.30	Beryl Waters	Episode: "Still Life"
1993	The Bill	Marion Draper	Episode: "Having What It Takes"
1995	Joking Apart	Prostitute	Episode #2.3
1995–1997	Heartbeat	Ruby Rowan	6 episodes
1995–1996	How to Be a Little Sod	Grandmother	7 episodes
1998–1999	EastEnders	Bev Williams	Recurring role
2000	Lexx	Hammer	Episode: "Girltown"
2001	Holby City	Nina Cocozza	Episode: "New Beginnings"
2003, 2008	Doctors	Josie Rogers / Cynthia Albury	2 episodes
2004	The Final Quest	Marian Snr	Television film
2007–2009, 2012–2024	Hollyoaks	Marlena "Nana" McQueen	Regular role
2009	Ashes to Ashes	Julia	Episode #2.1
2020	Hollyoaks Later	Marlena "Nana" McQueen	2020 special

=== Stage ===
Year	Title	Role	Venue
1968–1973	Hair	—N/a	Shaftesbury Theatre
1972	Jesus Christ Superstar	Ensemble	—N/a
1973–1974	Pippin	Fastrada	His Majesty's Theatre, London
1973	Two Gentlemen of Verona	Ensemble	—N/a
1975–1976	A Little Night Music	Petra	Adelphi Theatre
1976	A Chorus Line	Diana	Theatre Royal, Drury Lane
1976	T.Zee	Princess La	Royal Court Theatre
1978	She Loves Me	Ilona Ritter	—N/a
1979–1980	Songbook	Performer	Gielgud Theatre
1980	I'm Getting My Act Together and Taking It on the Road	Heather Jones	Apollo Theatre
1981–1983	Windy City	Molly Malloy*	Bristol Hippodrome; Victoria Palace Theatre
1984–1987	Stepping Out	Sylvia	—N/a
1986	Side by Side by Sondheim	Performer	—N/a
1988	The Rink	Angel	Cambridge Theatre
1988	Sunday with Sondheim	Herself	Shaftesbury Theatre
1992–1993	The Comedy of Errors	Courtesan	Various
1994	Johnny On a Spot	Pearl LaMonte	Royal National Theatre
1994	Sweet Bird of Youth	Miss Lucy	Royal National Theatre
1996	Cats	Grizabella	Various
1997	Steaming	Violet	Piccadilly Theatre
1998	Chicago	Matron "Mama" Morton	—N/a
2002	Follies	Carlotta Campion	Royal Festival Hall
2004	The Rink	Anna	Belgrade Theatre
2010–2011	Billy Elliot	Grandma	—N/a
