= Ronald Lacey =

British actor (1935–1991)

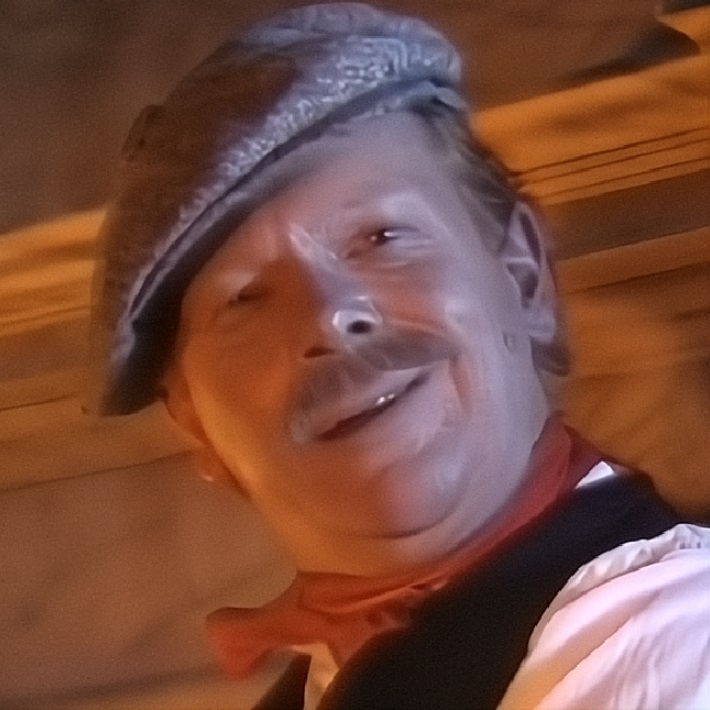
- Lacey performing in The Green Tie on the Little Yellow Dog
- Born: Ronald William Lacey; 28 September 1935; Harrow, Middlesex, England
- Died: 15 May 1991 (aged 55); London, England
- Education: Harrow Weald Grammar School
- Alma mater: London Academy of Music and Dramatic Art
- Occupation: Actor
- Years active: 1959–1991
- Spouses: Mela White (m. 1962; div. 1969) Joanna Baker (m. 1972; div. 1989)
- Children: 3, including Rebecca

Ronald William Lacey (28 September 1935 – 15 May 1991) was an English actor. He made numerous television and film appearances over a 30-year period. His roles included Harris in Porridge (1977), Frankie in the Bud Spencer comedy Charleston (1978), SD agent Sturmbannführer Arnold Ernst Toht in Raiders of the Lost Ark (1981) and the Bishop of Bath and Wells in Blackadder II (1986).

== Early life ==
Lacey was born and grew up in Harrow, Middlesex. He received his formal education at Harrow Weald Grammar School. After a brief period of national service in the British Armed Forces, he enrolled at the London Academy of Music and Dramatic Art to train as an actor.

== Career ==
Lacey began his acting career in 1959 in a television play, The Secret Agent. His first significant performance was at the Royal Court Theatre in 1962's Chips with Everything. Lacey had an unusual 'pug' look, with beady eyes, an upturned nose, an overbite, receding chin and no brows. He could scream at a very high pitch. This unique combination of features landed him repeatedly in bizarre roles on both stage and screen, often as cowardly, seedy, creepy villains. Together with his Welsh background, it helped qualify him for the role of Dylan Thomas, which he played on BBC2 in what critic Clive James described as a "bravura performance".

Lacey performed on British television throughout the 1960s and 1970s, with roles spanning from a part in Kenneth Clark's Civilisation television series, as the gravedigger, in a re-enactment of the gravedigger scene from Hamlet, with Ian Richardson as Hamlet and Patrick Stewart as Horatio, to a guest shot as the "Strange Young Man" in The Avengers episode "The Joker", and as Harris in the sitcom Porridge, with the latter finally landing him in the role for which his unusual physical characteristics could be repeatedly used to full advantage. Again, these were well shown in the episode "Soup of the Day" in the acclaimed Department S (1969) as a sniveling villain. Disappointed with his acting career by the late 1970s, he began to consider starting a talent agency. Steven Spielberg then cast him as the Nazi agent Arnold Toht in Raiders of the Lost Ark. He followed this with villain roles for the next five to six years: Sahara (1983) with Brooke Shields, Flesh and Blood (1985) with Rutger Hauer and Jennifer Jason Leigh, and Red Sonja (1985) with Arnold Schwarzenegger and Brigitte Nielsen. In 1982's Firefox with Clint Eastwood, Lacey played a Russian scientist helping the West behind the Iron Curtain. He then made two movies for Ice International Films: Assassinator starring alongside John Ryan and George Murcell, and Into the Darkness, starring with Donald Pleasence, John Ryan, and Brett Paul. He performed comic monologues on The Green Tie on the Little Yellow Dog, which was recorded 1982, and broadcast by Channel 4 in 1983.

Lacey played a number of villainous roles and was known for his trademark smile, which would turn into a gleaming malicious leer. He also had a rather large mole on his left cheek, which he chose not to have removed, as well as a highly distinctive voice. In 1983's Trenchcoat, he used the mole as a beauty mark in his role as Princess Aida, a mysterious drag queen on the island of Malta. His other drag role was in Invitation to the Wedding from 1985, in which he played a husband/wife couple.

== Personal life ==
Lacey married twice, first to the actress Mela White in 1962 (she married him under the name Brompton as this was her second marriage). They had two children, including Rebecca Lacey. Following their divorce, he married Joanna Baker in 1972, with whom he had a son.

== Death ==
Lacey was diagnosed with terminal liver cancer on 25 April 1991. He died less than one month later, on 15 May 1991, at the age of 55.

== Filmography ==
=== Films ===
Year	Title	Role	Notes
1962	The Boys	Billy Herne	
1963	Doctor in Distress	Café Customer	Uncredited
1964	Of Human Bondage	"Matty" Mathews	
1964	The Comedy Man	First Assistant Director	Uncredited
1967	The Fearless Vampire Killers	Village Idiot	
1967	How I Won the War	Spool	
1969	Take a Girl Like You	Graham	
1969	Otley	Curtis	
1971	Say Hello to Yesterday	Car Park Attendant	Uncredited
1971	Macbeth	Macbeth’s Man, Killed Banquo	Uncredited
1971	Crucible of Terror	Michael Clare	
1972	Disciple of Death	Parson	
1973	Gawain and the Green Knight	Oswald	
1973	The Final Programme	"Shades"	
1975	Mister Quilp	Harris	
1976	The Likely Lads	Ernie	
1977	Charleston	Frankie	
1979	Zulu Dawn	Norris Newman	
1980	Nijinsky	Léon Bakst	
1981	Raiders of the Lost Ark	Major Arnold Ernst Toht	
1982	Firefox	Dr. Maxim Ilyich Semelovsky	
1982	Tangiers	Wedderburn	
1983	Sahara	Lord Beg	
1983	Invitation to the Wedding	Clara/Charles Eatwell	
1983	Trenchcoat	Princess Aida	
1983	Yellowbeard	Man With Parrot	
1984	Making the Grade	Nicky	
1984	Sword of the Valiant	Oswald	
1984	The Adventures of Buckaroo Banzai Across the 8th Dimension	President Widmark	
1984	The Bengal Lancers!	Monsieur Yves	
1985	Flesh + Blood	Cardinal	
1985	Red Sonja	Ikol	
1986	Aces Go Places 4	Leader of the villains	
1986	Sky Bandits	Fritz	
1986	Lone Runner	Misha	
1986	Into the Darkness	Stewart Andrew Golding	
1988	Jailbird Rock	Warden Bauman	
1988	Manifesto	The Conductor	
1989	Indiana Jones and the Last Crusade	Heinrich Himmler	Uncredited
1989	Valmont	José	
1990	Stalingrad	Winston Churchill	
1992	The Assassinator	Stewart	
1992	Landslide	Fred Donner	
1993	Angely smerti		

=== TV ===
Year	Title	Role	Notes
1960	Deadline Midnight	Jensen	1 episode
1961	A Chance of Thunder	Johnny Travers	3 episodes
1962-68	Z-Cars	Various	4 episodes
1965	Comedy Playhouse	Justin Fribble	Episode: "Barnaby Spoot and the Exploding Whoopee Cushion"
1965	Gideon's Way	Jerry Blake	Episode: "Gang War"
1965-68	Theatre 625	Various	4 episodes
1966	Sergeant Cork	Albert Watson	Episode: "The Case of Albert Watson V.C."
1967	Great Expectations	Orlick	4 episodes
1967-68	The Avengers	Strange Young Man/Humbert Green	2 episodes
1968	Civilisation	Grave Digger	Episode: "Protest and Communication"
1969	Department S	Jeremy Standish	Episode: "The Soup of the Day"
1969	Randall and Hopkirk (Deceased)	Beatnik	Episode: "My Late Lamented Friend and Partner"
1970	The Adventures of Don Quick	Sergeant Sam Czopanser	Episode: "The Benefits of Earth"
1970	W. Somerset Maugham	Controleur	Episode: The Vessel of Wrath
1971	Catweazle	Ted "Tearful Ted"	Episode: "The Sign of the Crab"
1971-72	Jason King	Ryland	4 episodes
1972	The Protectors	Cribbe	Episode: "King Con"
1973	Colditz	Major Zibnek	Episode: "Murder?"
1973	Last of the Summer Wine	Walter	Episode: "The New Mobile Trio"
1973	Whatever Happened to the Likely Lads?	Ernie	Episode: "Moving On"
1975	The Fight Against Slavery	Charles James Fox	TV film
1975	The Sweeney	Barry Monk	Episode: "Thou Shalt Not Kill!"
1976	Thriller	Bartlett	Episode: "The Next Victim"
1976	Our Mutual Friend	Mr. Venus	5 episodes
1976	The New Avengers	Hong Kong Harry	Episode: "The Midas Touch"
1976	Play for Today	Lang	Episode: "A Story to Frighten the Children"
1976	The Duchess of Duke Street	Mr. Shephard	Episode: "The Outsiders"
1977	Porridge	Harris	3 episodes, including "A Storm in a Teacup" and "Rough Justice"
1978	All Creatures Great and Small	Stewie Brannon	Episode: "The Last Furlong"
1978	Dylan	Dylan Thomas	TV film
1978	The Mayor of Casterbridge	Jopp	4 episodes
1979	Blake's 7	Tynus	Episode: "Killer"
1979	Tropic	Geoffrey Turvey	Miniseries
1980	Lady Killers	Inspector Bannister	Episode: "Killing Mice"
1981	Tiny Revolutions	Interrogator	TV film
1982	P.O.S.H.	Mr. Vicarage	TV film
1983	Scarecrow and Mrs. King	Bobby Bouchard	Episode: "There Goes the Neighbourhood"
1983	Hart to Hart	Inspector Michelot	Episode: "Hostage Harts"
1983	The Hound of the Baskervilles	Inspector Lestrade	TV film
1984	Magnum, P.I.	Archer Hayes	Episode: "The Case of the Red-Faced Thespian"
1985	Connie	Crawder	4 episodes
1985	Minder	Harry Ridler	Episode: Minder on the Orient Express
1986	Blackadder II	The Bishop of Bath and Wells	Episode: "Money"
1987	Sherlock Holmes	Thaddeus Sholto/Bartholomew Sholto	Episode: The Sign of Four
1988	The Great Escape II: The Untold Story	Winston Churchill	TV film
1989	The Nightmare Years	Emil Luger	4 episodes
1990	Face to Face	Dr. Brinkman	TV film
1990	Haggard	The Seaman	Episode: "The Bellman"
1991	The Strauss Dynasty	Bauer	Miniseries
