= Don Warrington =

British actor (born 1951)

Don Warrington MBE
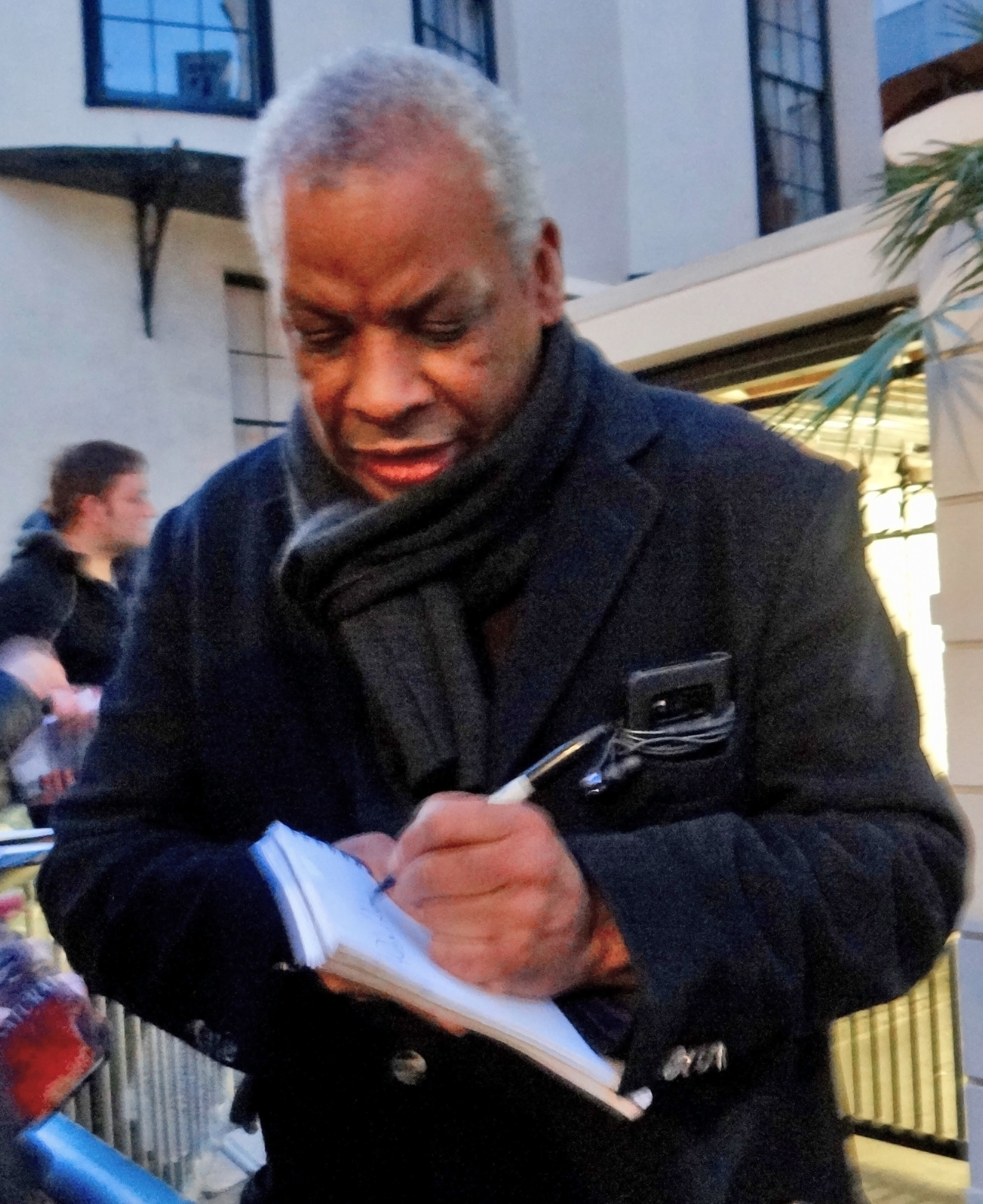
- Warrington in 2017
- Born: Don Williams; 23 May 1951 (age 75); Trinidad, Trinidad and Tobago
- Education: Harris College; Drama Centre London
- Occupation: Actor
- Years active: 1974–present
- Spouse(s): (1) Victoria Fairbrother; (2) Mary Maddocks
- Children: 2

Don Warrington MBE (born Don Williams, 23 May 1951) is a Trinidadian-born British actor. He is best known for playing Philip Smith in the ITV sitcom Rising Damp (1974–78), and Commissioner Selwyn Patterson in the BBC detective series Death in Paradise (2011–present). His son, Jake Fairbrother, is also an actor.

He was appointed Member of the Order of the British Empire (MBE) in the 2008 Birthday Honours.

== Early life ==
Warrington was born in Trinidad but moved to Newcastle upon Tyne with his mother and brother at the age of five, whilst his sister stayed in Trinidad. His father, Basil Kydd, was a Trinidadian politician who died in 1958.

Warrington attended Harris College (now the University of Lancashire) and trained as an actor at the Drama Centre London. As there was already an actor called Don Williams when he joined Equity, he took the stage surname Warrington after Warrington Road, the street he grew up in. He started acting in repertory theatre at the age of 17.

== Career ==
=== Television and film ===
Warrington originally became well known for playing Philip Smith in Rising Damp, from 1974 to 1978, alongside Leonard Rossiter, Richard Beckinsale, and Frances de la Tour. Warrington also appeared as series regular in the crime drama C.A.T.S. Eyes, as government contact Nigel Beaumont (1985–1987); as General Harris in Impact Earth (2007), and as Judge Ken Winyard in New Street Law.

In 1993 Warrington played television reporter Graham Gaunt in To Play the King, the second part of the BBC's House of Cards trilogy.

He has had smaller roles in many programmes including Red Dwarf, Lovejoy, Manchild, and Diamond Geezer. Warrington portrayed the founder of Time Lord society, Rassilon, in several Doctor Who audio plays, and also appeared as the President of an alternative-universe Great Britain in the Doctor Who episode "Rise of the Cybermen" (2006). Soon after, he recorded an abridged audio book of the Doctor Who novel The Art of Destruction by Stephen Cole.

He is one of the interviewees on the BBC 2 series Grumpy Old Men, and he appears in a series of Kenco coffee advertisements in the United Kingdom in which he plays an African coffee plantation owner. He regularly provides voice-overs for both BBC television and radio.

Warrington has also appeared in BBC1 sitcom The Crouches, which aired from 9 September 2003 until 2005. He played Bailey, who was Roly's boss at a London Underground station in South London. Roly was played by Robbie Gee. Warrington played the role of the Hospital Chaplain in Casualty, assuming the role of Trevor. He also starred in the 2010 film It's a Wonderful Afterlife. He also appeared in Grange Hill as Mr Peters, the father of pupil Lauren Peters.

He provided voiceover links, reading out the various methods of contacting the show on The Chris Evans Breakfast Show on BBC Radio 2, which was broadcast from 11 January 2010.

Since 2011, Warrington has played Commissioner Selwyn Patterson in the BBC show Death in Paradise.

He also appeared as jazz musician Frederick J. Louden in a BBC radio production of The Devil's Music, written by Alan Plater. In 2011, Warrington played the father of a suspected terrorist in the last series of the BBC drama Waking the Dead. In 2012, he played master of the college Marcus Harding in “Generation of Vipers”, S6:E2 of Lewis.

His film roles included the movie version of Rising Damp (1980), the Kenny Everett horror comedy Bloodbath at the House of Death (1983), The Lion of Africa (1987), Kenneth Branagh's Hamlet (1996), Peter Greenaway's 8½ Women (1999), and the horror film Lighthouse (1999).

=== Theatre ===
Warrington is also a theatre actor and has performed with the National Theatre, the Royal Shakespeare Company, Bristol Old Vic and the Royal Exchange, Manchester.

In 2012–13, he toured with Gwen Taylor in a new stage version of Driving Miss Daisy.

In 2013, Warrington played the lead role of Joe Keller, in Talawa Theatre Company's all-black revival of Arthur Miller's tragedy All My Sons at the Royal Exchange, Manchester, directed by Michael Buffong – a production that The Guardian reviewer called "flawless", giving it a five-star rating.

Warrington performed in the lead role of King Lear in a 2016 Talawa Theatre Company and Royal Exchange, Manchester production. Mark Shenton wrote in The Stage that "Warrington seizes and owns it with magnetic, majestic power" as "one of many virtues in this outstanding production." Claire Allfree in The Telegraph wrote: "Lear is the Everest of roles, and Don Warrington ... ascends the cliff face with magnificent authority. He rages around his daughters like a hulking thunder cloud in human form, not just the incarnation of absolute rule but of something more ancient and of the earth."

Warrington appeared as George in David Mamet's Glengarry Glen Ross between October 2017 and February 2018 at the Playhouse Theatre alongside Christian Slater, Robert Glenister, Kris Marshall and Daniel Ryan.

He appeared as the central protagonist Willy Loman in Arthur Miller's Death of a Salesman at the Royal Exchange Theatre from October to November 2018.

=== Strictly Come Dancing ===
In 2008, Warrington competed in the sixth series of Strictly Come Dancing, partnered with the 2005 and 2006 British National Champion in Latin American dance, Lilia Kopylova. After Week 4, Warrington was joint seventh out of the remaining 12 contestants with an average of 24.5 points. In Week 5, he was eliminated, having lost the dance-off against Heather Small, with the first three judges all voting for Small over Warrington.

He joined the show to step out of his comfort zone, and he appreciated the opportunity to learn to dance.

Week #	Dance/Song	Judges' score					Result
Week #	Dance/Song	Horwood	Phillips	Goodman	Tonioli	Total	Result
1	Cha-Cha-Cha / "Let's Groove Tonight"	3	5	6	5	19	Dance Off
3	Tango / "Whatever Lola Wants"	7	7	8	8	30	Safe
5	American Smooth / "Can't Smile Without You"	6	6	7	6	25	Eliminated

== Filmography ==
=== Film ===
Year	Title	Role	Notes
1976	Meetings, Bloody Meetings		Short film
1979	The Last Giraffe	Peter Mwenga	Television film
1980	Rising Damp	Philip Smith	
1984	Bloodbath at the House of Death	Stephen Wilson	
1987	The Lion of Africa	Henry Piggot	Television film
1990	Camping	Afrikansk Ambassadør	
1994	Red Dwarf: Smeg Ups	Commander Binks	Direct-to-video
1994	The Anatomist's Notebook	Anatomist	Short film
1996	Hamlet	Voltimand	
1997	The Trick	The Magic Man	Short film
1998	Babymother	Luther - The Don	Television film
1999	8½ Women	Simon	
1999	Tube Tales	Preacher	Segment: "Steal Away"
1999	Lighthouse	Prison Officer Ian Goslet	
1999	Black XXX-Mas	Black Santa	Short film
2000	Trick of the Light	Columbine	Short film
2004	Monkey Trousers	Various roles	Television film
2004	Fat Slags	General Secretary	
2006	Land of the Blind	First Sergeant	
2006	The Battersea Ripper		
2007	Expresso	Mr. Jones (Autopilot)	Short film
2007	Impact Earth	General Harris	Television film
2008	God, Smell and Her		
2010	It's a Wonderful Afterlife	Chief Superintendent	
2010	Interval	Sir Jeffries	Short film
2010	Terry Pratchett's Going Postal	Priest	Television film
2011	The Glass Man	Anton	
2013	Voodoo Magic	Lucky	
2014	Night Shift	Well-Mannered Don	Short film
2015	The Ark	Paul	Television film
2017	You, Me and Him	Charles	
2020	Spanish Pigeon	DI Patrick Greene	Short film
2021	Rhythm of Life		Short film
2022	Still We Thrive		Short film

=== Television ===
Year	Title	Role	Notes
1974	Crown Court	Emmanuel Nyopa	3 episodes: "The Probationer: Parts 1, 2 & 3"
1974–1978	Rising Damp	Philip Smith	Series regular; 28 episodes
1975	Six Days of Justice	Henry Vaughan	Episode: "The Good Samaritan"
1975	Against the Crowd	Albert Sharpe II	Episode: "Carbon Copy"
1975	Second City Firsts	Dave	Episode: "Club Havana"
1976	The XYY Man	Jomo Ibbon	Recurring role; 2 episodes
1978	Crown Court	Delroy Conway	Episode: "Black and Blue: Part 1"
1979	Play for Today	Jonathan Foot	Episode: "Billy"
1981	Triangle	Alan Lansing	Recurring role; 8 episodes
1982	Holding the Fort	Lieutenant Augustus Mrwebi	Episode: "All Boys Together"
1983	Live from Pebble Mill	Leroy	Episode: "Night Kids"
1983	Crown Court	Charles Benjamin	Episode: "A Black and White Case: Part 1"
1984	Crown Court	Charles Benjamin	Episode: "Oddball: Part 1"
1984	Fairly Secret Army	Johnson	Episode: "When the Talking Had to Stop"
1985–1986	The Mysteries	Angel Gabriel	Miniseries; 3 episodes
1985–1987	C.A.T.S. Eyes	Nigel Beaumont	Series regular; 28 episodes
1992	Red Dwarf	Commander Binks	Episode: "Holoship"
1992	Bookmark	Macbeth	Episode: "The Poet, the President and the Travelling Players"
1992	Trainer	DI Raffe	Recurring role; 2 episodes
1993	Lovejoy	Felix	Episode: "Dainty Dish"
1993	To Play the King	Graham Gaunt	Miniseries; 3 episodes
1994	The 10%ers	Fraser	Episode: "Awards"
1995	Chiller	John Meyburne	Episode: "Number Six"
1997	Grange Hill	Mr. Phillips	Recurring role; 8 episodes
1997	Backup	Youden	Episode: "Touched"
1999	The Seventh Scroll	Colonel Nogo	Miniseries; 3 episodes
1999	CI5: The New Professionals	Ndaka	Episode: "Tusk Force"
2000	Arabian Nights	Hari Ben Karim	Miniseries; 2 episodes
2000	Trial & Retribution	Willard Pembroke	Episode: "Trial and Retribution IV (Part 2)"
2001	The Armando Iannucci Shows	Ivy Diner	Episode: "Mortality" (uncredited role)
2002	Believe Nothing	Chairman	Recurring role; 4 episodes
2002–2003	Manchild	Patrick	Recurring role; 4 episodes
2003	Holby City	Ethan Hope	Recurring role; 4 episodes
2003–2005	The Crouches	Bailey	Series regular; 12 episodes
2006	Doctor Who	The President	Episode: "Rise of the Cybermen"
2006–2007	New Street Law	Judge Ken Winyard	Series regular; 13 episodes
2007	Diamond Geezer	Hector	Miniseries; 1 episode: "Old School Lies"
2009, 2014	Law & Order: UK	Police Commissioner Eamonn Callaghan	Recurring role; 2 episodes
2009–2010	Casualty	Trevor	Recurring role; 7 episodes
2011	M.I. High	Bodleian / Crime	Episode: "Ghosts"
2011	Waking the Dead	Gideon Barclay	2 episodes: "Conviction: Parts 1 & 2"
2011	This is Jinsy	Chief Thinker	Episode: "Vel"
2011–present	Death in Paradise	Commissioner Selwyn Patterson	Series regular; 77 episodes
2012	Lewis	Marcus Harding	Episode: "Generation of Vipers"
2014	Chasing Shadows	CS Harley Drayton	Miniseries; 4 episodes
2015	BBC Comedy Feeds: Sunny D	Lawrence	Miniseries; 4 episodes
2016	The Five	Ray Kenwood	Miniseries; 7 episodes
2017	Henry IX	Gilbert	Miniseries; 3 episodes
2020–2022	The World According to Grandpa	Grandpa	Series regular; 29 episodes
2023, 2025	Beyond Paradise	Commissioner Selwyn Patterson	2 episodes
2025–present	Policing Paradise	Narrator	
