= Otley (film) =

1969 British comedy thriller by Dick Clement

- British theatrical poster
- Directed by: Dick Clement
- Written by: Ian La Frenais; Dick Clement
- Based on: Otley; 1966 novel by Martin Waddell
- Produced by: Bruce Cohn Curtis
- Starring: Tom Courtenay; Romy Schneider
- Cinematography: Austin Dempster
- Edited by: Richard Best
- Music by: Stanley Myers
- Production companies: Highroad Productions; Bruce Cohn Curtis Films, Ltd.
- Distributed by: Columbia Pictures
- Release dates: 22 May 1969 (UK); 11 March 1969 (NYC)
- Running time: 91 minutes
- Country: United Kingdom
- Language: English

Otley is a 1969 British comedy thriller film directed by Dick Clement and starring Tom Courtenay and Romy Schneider. It was adapted by Clement and Ian La Frenais from the 1966 novel of the same name by Martin Waddell, and released by Columbia Pictures.

== Plot ==
Gerald Arthur "Gerry" Otley is a charming but feckless young drifter who scrapes a living from selling antiques in trendy 1960s London. Gerry's responsibility-free life suddenly takes a serious turn when he finds himself caught up in a round of murder, espionage and quadruple crossing. Mistaken for a spy, he is kidnapped and detained several times, and becomes romantically involved with a foreign agent working for British Intelligence.

== Cast ==
- Tom Courtenay as Gerald Arthur Otley, "Gerry"
- Romy Schneider as Imogen
- Alan Badel as Sir Alec Hadrian
- James Villiers as Hendrickson
- Leonard Rossiter as Johnston
- Freddie Jones as Philip Proudfoot
- Fiona Lewis as Lin
- James Bolam as Albert
- James Cossins as Jeffcock
- James Maxwell as Rollo
- Edward Hardwicke as Lambert
- Ronald Lacey as Curtis
- Phyllida Law as Jean
- Geoffrey Bayldon as Superintendent Hewett
- Frank Middlemass as Bruce (as Frank Middlemas)
- Robert Brownjohn as Paul
- Barry Fantoni as Larry
- Don McKillop as police driver

== Production ==
The exterior action takes place in a number of recognisable London locations: the area around Portobello Road street market in Notting Hill; a houseboat colony near Cheyne Walk in Chelsea; Bowater House in Knightsbridge; the Playboy Club in Park Lane; and the old Unilever milk depot in Wood Lane. A wide range of period British vehicles is featured: Otley drives an E-Type Jaguar, a Ford Anglia and an early 1960s passenger coach, and his disastrous driving test, which turns into an epic car chase, involves a driving-school Vauxhall Viva and a Ford Zephyr.

The film, whose interiors were shot at Shepperton Studios, marked the directorial debut of Dick Clement.

Don Partridge co-wrote and performed the title music, "Homeless Bones", which was released as the B-side of his 1969 single "Colour My World".

== Critical reception ==
Jack Ibberson of The Monthly Film Bulletin called the film: "[a] vastly entertaining comedy-thriller", writing "the film's main asset lies in the performances, which are uniformly excellent. Tom Courtenay makes the thieving, cowardly Otley a wholly credible and sympathetic character whose all too human failings seem infinitely more acceptable than the double-dealing of the suave characters whose world he reluctantly enters. ... Courtenay's performance is a masterpiece of bewilderment ... delightful entertainment and a credit to all involved."

Vincent Canby of The New York Times wrote, "Like Otley, the movie is a bad risk. Everything in it is borrowed and badly used – actors (Tom Courtenay, Alan Badel), situations (the triumph of the fraudulent fool) and even settings, including a rather handsome Thames houseboat that reminded me wistfully of The Horse's Mouth. Otley is the kind of movie that allows you to think about other movies, in those great gaps of time between the setting up of a gag and the moment when it is ritualistically executed."

Gene Siskel of the Chicago Tribune wrote that the film was so boring it "could put Sominex out of business" and admitted to walking out on it, reporting, "I took the CTA to see Otley at the Coronet theater in Evanston. The film began at 6:15 p. m. I returned home on the 7 p.m. train."

Variety wrote that "the film has an uneasy lack of a point of view and fails to focus viewer's attention on any particular character or plotline philosophy. The frantic, intentionally incoherent episodes are sometimes amusing, but too often suffer from unoriginality."

Judith Crist described it as "a bright, breezy, light-handed but never lightheaded spies-and-counterspies story".

In Sixties British Cinema, Robert Murphy wrote, "The only British spy film which succeeds both as a comedy and a thriller is Dick Clement and Ian LaFrenais's Otley."

== Awards ==
The film won the 1969 Writers' Guild of Great Britain Award for Best British Comedy Screenplay.
