= Leonard Rossiter =

British actor (1926–1984)

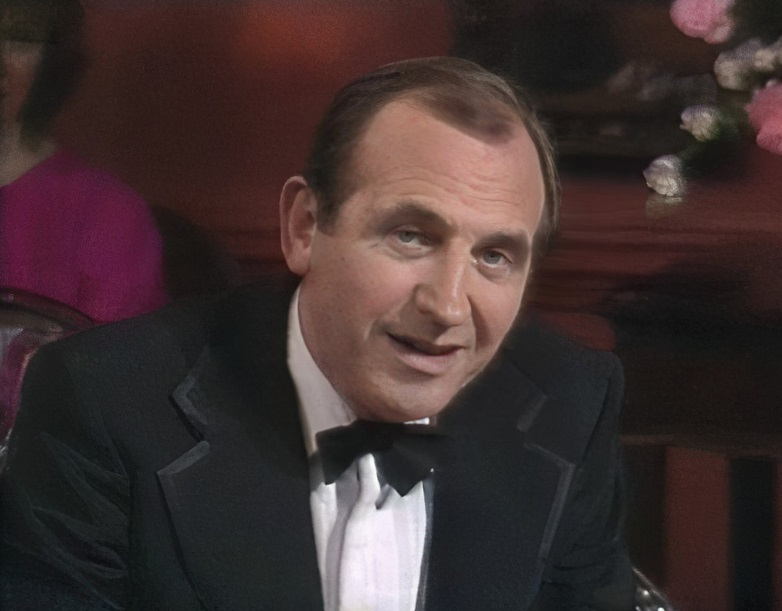
- Rossiter performing in The Green Tie on the Little Yellow Dog
- Born: 21 October 1926; Wavertree, Liverpool, England
- Died: 5 October 1984 (aged 57); Lyric Theatre, London, England
- Occupation: Actor
- Years active: 1954–1984
- Spouses: Josephine Tewson (m. 1958; div. 1961) Gillian Raine (m. 1972)
- Children: 1

Leonard Rossiter (21 October 1926 – 5 October 1984) was an English actor. He had a long career in the theatre but achieved his highest profile for his television comedy roles starring as Rupert Rigsby in the ITV series Rising Damp from 1974 to 1978, and Reginald Perrin in the BBC's The Fall and Rise of Reginald Perrin from 1976 to 1979.

== Early life ==
Rossiter was born on 21 October 1926 in Wavertree, Liverpool, the second son of John and Elizabeth (née Howell) Rossiter. The family lived over the barber's shop owned by his father. He was educated at the Liverpool Collegiate School (1939–46). In September 1939, when the Second World War began, Rossiter was an evacuee, along with his schoolmates, and went to Bangor in north Wales, where he stayed for 18 months.

While at school, his ambition was to go to university to read modern languages and become a teacher; however, his father, who served as a voluntary ambulanceman during the war, was killed in the May Blitz air raid in 1941. Rossiter then had to support his mother, therefore he could not take up the place he had been offered at the University of Liverpool. Instead, he completed his National Service as a sergeant, initially in the Intelligence Corps, then in the Army Education Corps, spending much of the time in Germany writing letters home for other soldiers. After being demobbed he worked for six years as an insurance clerk in the claims and accident departments of the Commercial Union Insurance Company.

== Career ==
=== Theatre ===
Rossiter started acting after his actress girlfriend challenged him to try it, after he had scoffed at the performances of the amateur group she was in. He joined the Wavertree Community Centre Drama Group and made his first appearance with the Adastra Players in Terence Rattigan's Flare Path. The local critic said that he "was particularly outstanding, his one fault being a tendency to speak too fast on one or two occasions". He gave up his insurance job to enrol in Preston repertory theatre and became a professional actor at the age of 27. He made his professional stage debut in Joseph Colton's The Gay Dog in Preston on 6 September 1954.

He later became assistant stage manager there, and then went on to Wolverhampton and Salisbury repertory companies. In his first 19 months in the business he played some 75 roles. He said later: "There was no time to discuss the finer points of interpretation. You studied the part, you did it and then you studied the next part. I developed a frightening capacity for learning lines. The plays became like Elastoplast, which you just stuck on and then tore off. It was the perfect preparation for rehearsing situation comedy on television at the rate of one episode a week."

In 1957–58, he played in the musical Free as Air and then toured in Eugene O'Neill's The Iceman Cometh. He joined the Bristol Old Vic and was there for two years, from 1959 to 1961, a time he described as "the bedrock of his career", followed by other stage work, in, among other plays, The Strange Case of Martin Richter, Disabled, The Heretic, The Caretaker and Semi-Detached (in New York). His performance in the premiere of Michael Blakemore's stage production of Bertolt Brecht's The Resistible Rise of Arturo Ui in 1969 met with critical acclaim.

=== Film and television ===
Rossiter soon established himself as a character actor in films and television, as well as on stage. He stated: "I think I sensed fairly early on that I was not physically or facially built in the way that would ever fit even remotely into heroic or what used to be called juvenile parts. I always played character parts – right from the start." His first film role was in A Kind of Loving (1962). In Billy Liar (1963) he played the title character's boss. His first major television role was as Detective-Inspector Bamber in the long-running police television series Z-Cars. He also had guest roles in series as diverse as The Avengers ("Dressed to Kill", 1963) and Steptoe and Son ("The Lead Man Cometh", 1964; "The Desperate Hours", 1972). Among his early film credits were four films directed by Bryan Forbes, namely King Rat (1965), The Wrong Box (1966), The Whisperers (1967), and Deadfall (1968).

In 1968, he played Mr Sowerberry in the film version of Lionel Bart's musical Oliver! and took one of the few speaking supporting roles in 2001: A Space Odyssey as the Russian scientist Smyslov. He worked with Stanley Kubrick again in Barry Lyndon (1975), in the role of Captain John Quin. He appeared opposite Peter Sellers in The Pink Panther Strikes Again (1976) as Superintendent Quinlan. In 1968, he appeared in Nigel Kneale's television play The Year of the Sex Olympics, an episode of BBC2's Theatre 625, one of his four appearances in the series.

In Rising Damp, on ITV, Rossiter played Rupert Rigsby, the lecherous landlord of a house converted into shabby bedsits, reprising the role from the successful stage version, The Banana Box. While he was in Rising Damp he also took the lead role in The Fall and Rise of Reginald Perrin, adapted by David Nobbs from his own comic novels and broadcast on the BBC. Rossiter was given a surprise tribute on This Is Your Life in 1975. He appeared in "I Tell You It's Burt Reynolds", an episode of the 1977 Yorkshire Television series The Galton & Simpson Playhouse, as well as the short films The Waterloo Bridge Handicap (1978), and Galton and Simpson's Le Pétomane (1979). After his portrayal of Reginald Perrin, Rossiter's non-comedy roles on television became less frequent, although there were exceptions, such as a debt collector in the one-off HTV thriller Machinegunner (1976), and Frank Harris in Fearless Frank, or Tit-bits from the Life of an Adventurer (1978), a BBC Play of the Week.

From 1978 to 1983, Rossiter performed in ten commercials for Cinzano. The series of adverts was created by film director Alan Parker and, at Rossiter's suggestion, used an old music hall joke where he spills a drink over his wife, played by Joan Collins. In the Channel 4 programme The 100 Greatest TV Ads (2000) Terry Lovelock, the director of two of the commercials, said that Rossiter used to refer jokingly to Collins as "The Prop".

Rossiter reprised Rigsby for a film version of Rising Damp in 1980, thus achieving the distinction of playing the same role on stage, television, and film. He continued to make a steady stream of film appearances, including a role in Lindsay Anderson's Britannia Hospital (1982). His last television role was as the supermarket manager in another ITV sitcom, Tripper's Day (1984).

He performed comic monologues in The Green Tie on the Little Yellow Dog, which was recorded 1982, and broadcast by Channel 4 in 1983.

Rossiter also played the title role in the BBC Television Shakespeare production of The Life and Death of King John (1984). His last film appearance was in Water (1985).

== Radio and voice work ==
In the animated adaptation of The Perishers (1979), Rossiter provided the voice for Boot the dog. He narrated an abridged version of the Charles Dickens book A Christmas Carol, which was released on cassette in 1979. He appeared on the BBC Radio 4 show Desert Island Discs in 1980. In 1981, he hosted an episode of the BBC Radio 4 show With Great Pleasure in which he recited some of his favorite poetry and prose alongside his wife, Gillian Raine, and his friend, the actor James Grout. Also in 1981, he narrated a seven-part series of satirical five-minute monologues, written by Barry Pilton for BBC Radio 3, titled In a Nutshell, followed in 1982 by a second series, also written by Barry Pilton, this time comprising 8 five-minute monologues. Rossiter narrated a three-part series of the children's story Harlequin and Columbine for Story Teller magazine in 1984. He voiced the King of Hearts in two episodes of Anglia Television's version of Alice In Wonderland, which was broadcast in April 1985, six months after Rossiter's death.

== Writing ==
Rossiter displayed his acid wit in two books: The Devil's Bedside Book (1980), a collection of cynical dictionary definitions in the style of Ambrose Bierce's The Devil's Dictionary, and The Lowest Form of Wit, (1981), a collection of biting bons mots, stinging retorts, insults and sarcasm illustrated with cartoons by Martin Honeysett. He also wrote the introduction to cook Keith Floyd's 1981 book Floyd's Food.

== Personal life ==
Rossiter's first marriage was to the actress Josephine Tewson, with whom he had worked many times in repertory theatre in the 1950s. They married in 1958. The marriage ended in divorce in 1961. His second wife was the actress Gillian Raine, with whom he had a daughter, Camilla, and to whom he was still married at the time of his death. Rossiter had met Raine when he played the lead role of Fred Midway in David Turner's play Semi-Detached, in a production directed by Tony Richardson. The play opened on 8 June 1962 at the Belgrade Theatre in Coventry and ran for a week. During the play's second run at the Belgrade, in September 1963, the couple fell in love and moved in together, but they did not marry until 1972.

Rossiter was a fan of the football club Everton, and a staunch supporter of the Conservative Party. He was also a wine connoisseur, and converted his attic into a sort of wine cellar.

After his death, it was revealed that Rossiter had a five-year affair with the broadcaster Sue MacGregor. His wife had not been aware of their relationship until she received a letter from MacGregor breaking the news that her memoirs, which were about to be published, would include an account of the affair.

== Death ==
On 5 October 1984, Rossiter died from hypertrophic cardiomyopathy while waiting to go onstage at the Lyric Theatre, London, where he was performing in Joe Orton's play Loot.

A memorial service was held on 15 November 1984 at St Paul's, Covent Garden. Attendees included Rossiter's Loot castmates, as well as Derek Nimmo, Fulton Mackay, and Ned Sherrin. Loot director, Jonathan Lynn, gave a eulogy in which he said of Rossiter: "Now that Leonard is up there, things had better be properly managed: I hope that the Heavenly Gates opened on cue and that the Choir of Angels is singing in tune. They had better be professional in Paradise. Because, if not, they'll certainly hear about it from Leonard."

== Legacy and tributes ==
Rossiter was posthumously nominated for a Laurence Olivier Award for "Comedy Performance of the Year", for his role as Inspector Truscott in Loot.

In 1985, the book Leonard Rossiter by author Robert Tanitch was published. The book featured a collection of rare photos and reminiscences from friends and colleagues of Rossiter's.

In 2000, the ITV biography series The Unforgettable broadcast an episode about Rossiter's life. His wife and daughter were interviewed, as well as former colleagues, including Don Warrington, Joan Collins, and Sue Nicholls.

A biography of Rossiter, Leonard Rossiter: Character Driven, was published in 2010 by author Guy Adams.

== Film ==
Year	Title	Role	Notes
1962	A Kind of Loving	Whymper	
1963	This Sporting Life	Phillips, sports writer	
1963	Billy Liar	Mr Shadrack	
1964	The Long Ships	Persian Soldier	Uncredited
1964	A Jolly Bad Fellow	Dr. Fisher	
1965	King Rat	McCoy	
1966	Hotel Paradiso	Inspector	
1966	The Wrong Box	Vyvyan Montague	
1966	The Witches	Dr. Wallis	
1967	Deadlier Than the Male	Henry Bridgenorth	
1967	The Whisperers	Assistance Board Officer	
1968	2001: A Space Odyssey	Dr. Andrei Smyslov	
1968	Oliver!	Mr. Sowerberry	
1968	Deadfall	Fillmore	
1968	Diamonds for Breakfast	Inspector Dudley	
1969	Otley	Johnson	
1974	Luther	Brother Weinand	
1974	If There Weren't Any Blacks You'd Have To Invent Them	Blind Man	
1975	Barry Lyndon	Capt. John Quin	
1976	The Pink Panther Strikes Again	Superintendent Quinlan	
1976	Voyage of the Damned	Commander Von Bonin	
1978	The Waterloo Bridge Handicap	Charles Barker	Short Film
1979	Le Pétomane	Joseph Pujol	Short Film
1980	Rising Damp	Rupert Rigsby	Film
1982	Britannia Hospital	Vincent Potter	
1985	Water	Sir Malcolm Leveridge	

== Television ==
Year	Title	Role	Notes
1962, 1963	ITV Television Playhouse	Harry/William Acton	2 episodes
1963	Z-Cars	DI Bamber	8 episodes
1963	The Avengers	William J. Cavendish	Episode: "Dressed to Kill"
1963-1965	ITV Play of the Week	Various	4 episodes
1964	Love Story	Sgt. "Tubby" Watson	Episode: "Beggars and Choosers"
1964	Redcap	Sgt. Rolfe	Episode: "Epitah for a Sweat"
1964, 1972	Steptoe and Son	Welsh Hughie/Johnny Spooner	The Lead Man Cometh, The Desperate Hours episodes.
1966-1968	Theatre 625	Various	4 episodes
1966-1972	BBC Play of the Month	The Prime Minister/Colonel Lukyn	2 episodes
1966	Death is a Good Living	Norman Lynch	Miniseries
1967	The Revenue Men	Ormerod	Episode: "The Benefactor"
1967-1969	ITV Playhouse	Fred Tomlinson/Nikolai Krobnevesky	2 episodes
1967-1970	The Wednesday Play	Mr. Marcus/Mr. Jeffs	2 episodes
1967-1973	Thirty-Minute Theatre	Various	3 episodes
1969-1971	ITV Sunday Night Theatre	"X"/Harry	2 episodes
1971	Thick as Thieves	Eddie, the Safe Breaker	TV film
1974	Comedy Playhouse	Smithy	Episode: "Pygmalion Smith"
1974–1978	Rising Damp	Rupert Rigsby	
1975-1984	Play for Today	Various	3 episodes
1976–1979	The Fall and Rise of Reginald Perrin	Reginald Perrin	
1976	Machinegunner	Cyril Dugdale	TV film
1977	The Galton & Simpson Playhouse	Uncle Jim	Episode: "I Tell You, It's Burt Reynolds"
1978	BBC Play of the Month	Frank Harris	Episode: "Fearless Frank"
1978	The Losers	Sydney Foskett	
1978	The Morecambe and Wise Christmas Show	Himself	
1979	The Perishers	Boot (voice)	
1983	The Green Tie on the Little Yellow Dog		
1984	Tripper's Day	Norman Tripper	
1984	BBC Television Shakespeare	John, King of England	The Life and Death of King John
1985	Alice in Wonderland	King of Hearts	2 episodes

== Theatre ==
Year	Title	Role	Director	Playwright(s)	Theatre
1959	The Clandestine Marriage	Canton	John Hale	George Colman and David Garrick	Theatre Royal, Bristol
1959	Romeo and Juliet	Sampson & Friar John	John Hale	William Shakespeare	Theatre Royal, Bristol
1959	The Silent Woman	Sir John Daw	John Hale	Ben Jonson	Theatre Royal, Bristol
1959	The Long and the Short and the Tall	Private Bamforth	David Scase	Willis Hall	Theatre Royal, Bristol
1959	Hooray for Daisy!	Harry Tuck	Denis Carey	Julian Slade and Dorothy Reynolds	Theatre Royal, Bristol
1960	A Taste of Honey	Peter	John Hale	Shelagh Delaney	Theatre Royal, Bristol
1960	Mary Stuart	Lord Burleigh	John Hale	Friedrich Schiller (adapted by Stephen Spender)	Theatre Royal, Bristol
1960	The Woodcarver	Griff	Prunella Scales	Morris Brown	Theatre Royal, Bristol
1960	She Stoops to Conquer	Tony Lumpkin	Dudley Jones	Oliver Goldsmith	Theatre Royal, Bristol
1960	The Hostage	Pat	John Hale	Brendan Behan	Theatre Royal, Bristol
1960	The Comedy of Errors	Dromio of Syracuse	John Hale	William Shakespeare	Theatre Royal, Bristol
1960	Romeo and Juliet	Friar Lawrence	John Hale	William Shakespeare	Theatre Royal, Bristol
1960	Rhinoceros	The Logician	John Hale	Eugène Ionesco	Theatre Royal, Bristol
1960	The Tempest	Stephano	John Hale	William Shakespeare	Theatre Royal, Bristol
1960	Caesar and Cleopatra	Rufio	Tony Robertson	George Bernard Shaw	Theatre Royal, Bristol
1960	One Way Pendulum	Arthur Groomkirby	Alan Bridges	N.F. Simpson	Theatre Royal, Bristol
1960	Dick Whittington	Cicely Suett	Frank Dunlop	V.C. Clinton-Baddeley and Gavin Gordon	Theatre Royal, Bristol
1961	Roots	Mr. Bryant	Duncan Ross	Arnold Wesker	Theatre Royal, Bristol
1961	A Passage to India	Richard Fielding	Alan Bridges	Santha Rama Rau (based on the novel by E.M. Forster)	Theatre Royal, Bristol
1961	Richard II	Henry Bolingbroke	John Hale	William Shakespeare	Theatre Royal, Bristol
1961	The Killer	The Architect & Second Policeman	John Hale	Eugène Ionesco	Theatre Royal, Bristol
1961	A Man for All Seasons	The Common Man	Warren Jenkins	Robert Bolt	Theatre Royal, Bristol
1961	Goat Song	Celestino	John Hale	Martin Shuttleworth	Theatre Royal, Bristol
1961	North City Traffic Straight Ahead	Harry Hopkins	Alan Simpson	James Douglas	Gaiety Theatre, Dublin
1961	The Caretaker	Davies	Gareth Davies	Harold Pinter	The Leatherhead Theatre Club
1962	The Recruiting Officer	Sergeant Kite	Frank Dunlop	George Farquhar	Nottingham Playhouse
1962	Arms and the Man	Sergius Saranoff	David Forder	George Bernard Shaw	Belgrade Theatre, Coventry
1962	Red Roses for Me	Brennan o' the Moor	Julius Gellner	Seán O'Casey	Mermaid Theatre, London
1962–1963	Semi-Detached	Fred Midway	Tony Richardson	David Turner	Belgrade Theatre, Coventry; Music Box Theatre, New York
1964	Hamp	Lieutenant Tom Webb	John Gibson	John Wilson	Theatre Royal, Newcastle
1965	Ghosts	Pastor Menders	Adrian Rendle	Henrik Ibsen	Theatre Royal Stratford East
1966	Volpone	Corvino	Frank Hauser	Ben Jonson	Oxford Playhouse
1967–1968	The Resistible Rise of Arturo Ui	Arturo Ui	Michael Blakemore	Bertolt Brecht (adapted by George Tabori)	Citizens Theatre, Glasgow; Lyceum Theatre, Edinburgh
1968	The Strange Case of Martin Richter	Martin Richter	Michael Blakemore	Stanley Eveling	Hampstead Theatre, London
1969	The Resistible Rise of Arturo Ui	Arturo Ui	Michael Blakemore	Bertolt Brecht (adapted by George Tabori)	Nottingham Playhouse; Saville Theatre, London
1970	The Heretic	Giordano Bruno	Morris West and Joseph O'Connor	Morris West	Duke of York's Theatre, London
1971	Disabled	Barker	Vivian Matalon	Peter Ransley	Hampstead Theatre, London
1971	Richard III	Richard III	Peter McEnery	William Shakespeare	Nottingham Playhouse
1972	The Caretaker	Davies	Christopher Morahan	Harold Pinter	Mermaid Theatre, London
1973	The Banana Box	Rooksby	David Scase	Eric Chappell	Adeline Genée Theatre, East Grinstead; Apollo Theatre, London
1974	Abel, Where Is Your Brother?	The Narrator & I	Amos Mokadi	Julius Edliss (translated by Ariadne Nicolaeff)	Act-In Theatre Club, Piccadilly, London
1974	The Looneys	Brian	Michael Rudman	John Antrobus	Hampstead Theatre, London
1975	A Christmas Carol	Ebeneezer Scrooge	Michael Fabian	Charles Dickens	Touring production
1976–1977	The Frontiers of Farce (adaptation of the plays ''The Purging'' by Georges Feydeau & The Singer by Frank Wedekind)	Follavoine & Dhuring	Peter Barnes	Georges Feydeau & Frank Wedekind (adapted by Peter Barnes)	Theatre Royal, Bristol; Criterion Theatre, London
1976	Tartuffe	Tartuffe	David Thompson	Molière (translated by David Thompson)	Greenwich Theatre, London
1977–1978	The Immortal Haydon (one-man show)	Haydon	Alan Strachan	John Wells	Mermaid Theatre, London; Greenwich Theatre, London
1979	Semi-Detached	Fred Midway	Leonard Rossiter & Alan Strachan	David Turner	Greenwich Theatre, London and toured
1980	Make and Break	Garrard	Michael Blakemore	Michael Frayn	Lyric Theatre, London; Theatre Royal Haymarket
1982	The Rules of the Game	Leone Gala	Anthony Quayle	Luigi Pirandello (translated by Robert Rietti & Noel Gregeen)	Theatre Royal, Nottingham; Theatre Royal Haymarket; Phoenix Theatre, London
1983–1984	Tartuffe	Tartuffe	Peter Coe	Molière (adapted by Miles Malleson)	Churchill Theatre, Bromley
1984	Loot	Truscott	Jonathan Lynn	Joe Orton	Ambassadors Theatre, London; Lyric Theatre, London

== Awards and nominations ==
Year	Awards	Category	Work	Result	Ref.
1977	British Academy of Film and Television Arts	BAFTA Award for Best Light Entertainment Performance	The Fall and Rise of Reginald Perrin	Nominated	
1978	British Academy of Film and Television Arts	BAFTA Award for Best Light Entertainment Performance	The Fall and Rise of Reginald Perrin + Rising Damp	Nominated	
1979	British Academy of Film and Television Arts	BAFTA Award for Best Light Entertainment Performance	The Fall and Rise of Reginald Perrin + Rising Damp + The Losers	Nominated	
1981	Evening Standard British Film Awards	Peter Sellers Award for Comedy	Outstanding career in British film comedy	Won	
1984	Laurence Olivier Awards	Best Comedy Performance	Loot	Nominated	
