= The Great McGonagall (film) =

1975 British film by Joseph McGrath

- UK Quad
- Directed by: Joseph McGrath
- Written by: Joseph McGrath; Spike Milligan
- Starring: Spike Milligan; Peter Sellers; Julia Foster; John Bluthal; Victor Spinetti
- Cinematography: John Mackey
- Edited by: Rusty Coppleman
- Music by: John Shakespeare
- Production company: Oppidan Film Productions
- Distributed by: Tigon British Film Productions (UK)
- Release dates: 22 January 1975 (London, England)
- Running time: 85 minutes
- Country: United Kingdom
- Language: English

The Great McGonagall is a 1975 British comedy film directed by Joseph McGrath and starring Spike Milligan, Peter Sellers and Julia Foster. It was written by McGrath and Milligan.

== Plot ==
The film is a humorous biography of the Scottish poet William McGonagall that includes several of McGonagall's poems, his appearing in the title role of Macbeth and his "improvement" of the Bard's plot, his pilgrimage to Balmoral Castle, the attempted assassination of Queen Victoria by Roderick McLean and a tribute to McGonagall from Lt Frederick Rollo of the Royal Scots in Zululand.

== Cast ==
- Spike Milligan as William McGonagall
- Peter Sellers as Queen Victoria
- Julia Foster as Mrs. McGonagall
- John Bluthal as Mr. Giles / MacDuff / Hercules Faint / British Soldier / Policeman / McLain / Sheriff / Judge
- Victor Spinetti as Mr. Stewart / Second-Lieutenant Rollo / John Brown / Gentleman, / Revolutionary / Cardinal / Policeman
- Valentine Dyall as Army Sergeant / Lord Tennyson / Doctor / Native Messenger / Policeman / Fop
- Clifton Jones as King Theebaw / Policeman / Clerk of The Court / Mr. Stewart's Assistant / Zulu Chief / Ruffian / Fop
- Julian Chagrin as Prince Albert / Reverend Julian Gilfillan / Publican / Balmoral Policeman / Stagehand / Ruffian / Mr. Stewart's Assistant / British Soldier
- Charlie Young Atom as Postman / Policeman / Sleeper In The Snow / Theatre Announcer / Drinker

== Production ==
On the DVD commentary Joseph McGrath recounted the film was made in three weeks at Wilton's Music Hall in London, including one week of rehearsal. Peter Sellers was on the film for only one week. McGrath said Sellers "insisted on coming and guesting in it" and played the role of Queen Victoria on his knees, wearing roller-skates.

The film was produced by British pornography producer David Grant, who forced McGrath to put in some nude scenes and used the film as a tax write-off. McGrath also dubbed Charlie Atom's lines when he was unavailable for the dubbing of the film.

The Great McGonagall was the seventh in a string of flops for Sellers, whose career improved with his next film The Return of the Pink Panther (1975).

== Critical reception ==
The Monthly Film Bulletin wrote: "Surely one of the most embarrassingly unfunny films ever to see the light of day, The Great McGonagall perpetrates some wretchedly uninspired gags ... it fails either to let Milligan loose on his own inconsequential flights of fancy or ... to pull him into line and tailor his anarchic genius to the demands of a more considered script. As it is, the film makes half-hearted moves in both directions at once and takes a pratfall considerably more ignominious than those suffered by its eponymous hero."

In The New York Times, Richard Eder wrote "The Great McGonagall, which opened yesterday at the Cinema Village, is endearing, and parts of it are lively and hilarious. But it lacks enough of an organizing principle in its chaos to succeed as a movie ... The pace is frenetic, the level of reality shifts every two minutes, it is stuffed with visual absurdities, old jokes and take-offs. Some work, some exasperate ... McGonagall dies, and you are sorry. Despite his madness, his delusions, his bad poems, you miss him. He is a radiant failure. So, in a way, is his movie, with all bad jokes, carelessness and confusion."

Variety wrote: "The cast of familiar British faces, many in multiple roles, tries hard, but all are done in by a witless script, hodgepodge structure and sledgehammer direction. Even Sellers can't save it."

Leslie Halliwell said: "Appalling tribute to a minor figure of sub-literature."

The Radio Times Guide to Films gave the film 1/5 stars, writing: "Whatever the shortcomings of the Victorian versifier – the unemployed Scot who was determined to be the Queen's laureate – he didn't deserve this snide, incoherent jeering. Comedians Spike Milligan and Peter Sellers lead with the machetes, carving fun out of a simple-minded man whose verses didn't scan and whose thoughts were banal, but it's the mutual admiration society of the principals that scores its own goal."

== Books ==
A related book, The Great McGonagall Scrapbook by Spike Milligan and Jack Hobbs, was published by M & J Hobbs in 1975, with a paperback edition by Star Books in 1976. Milligan and Hobbs co-wrote three more McGonagall books: William McGonagall: The Truth at Last, with illustrations by Peter Sellers (Michael Joseph, 1976), William McGonagall Meets George Gershwin: A Scottish Fantasy (Penguin Books,1988) and William McGonagall: Freefall (Penguin Books,1992).
