= The Losers (TV series) =

- Genre: Sitcom
- Starring: Leonard Rossiter; Alfred Molina; Joe Gladwin
- Country of origin: United Kingdom
- No. of series: 1
- No. of episodes: 6

Production
- Running time: 30 minutes
- Production company: ATV

Original release
- Network: ITV
- Release: 12 November – 17 December 1978

The Losers is a British sitcom that aired on ITV in 1978. Written by Alan Coren, it stars Leonard Rossiter and Alfred Molina. The Losers was made for ITV by ATV and was produced and directed by Joe McGrath.

In The Losers, Rossiter plays Sydney Foskett, a wrestling promoter who discovers a young new wrestler called "The Butcher", played by Molina, who Foskett ensures loses to get the public's love.

== Cast ==
- Leonard Rossiter – Sydney Foskett
- Alfred Molina – Nigel
- Joe Gladwin – Dennis Breene

== Plot ==
Sydney Foskett is a wrestling promoter who discovers young new wrestler and part-time footballer, "The Butcher", whose real name is Nigel. Foskett, realising that the public love a loser, devises ways for "The Butcher" to lose without the dimwitted Nigel to know what is happening. Foskett often gets paid well for rigging the matches.

== Episodes ==
The Losers aired on ITV from 12 November to 17 December 1978. All episodes aired on Sundays at 9.15pm and are 30 minutes long. The broadcast masters for all six episodes were later wiped for reuse, though episodes one through five were later found to have survived as poor quality off-air domestic video recordings. However the final episode, "Togetherness", is still missing from the archives and can be presumed lost. The Times obituary of Alan Coren in 2007 said the series "sank with all hands".

1. "A Star Is Born" (12 November 1978)
2. "The Naming of Parts" (19 November 1978)
3. "Out Of The Strong" (26 November 1978)
4. "All Down in Black and White" (3 December 1978)
5. "Sitting on a Goldmine" (10 December 1978)
6. "Togetherness" (17 December 1978)

== DVD release ==
A region 2 DVD containing restored editions of the surviving episodes was released by Network on 21 January 2013
