= Joseph McGrath (film director) =

Scottish retired director, producer and screenwriter (born 1928)

- Born: 28 March 1928 (age 98); Glasgow, Scotland
- Occupations: Director, producer and screenwriter

Joseph McGrath (born 28 March 1928) is a Scottish retired film and television director, producer and screenwriter.

== Early life ==
Joseph McGrath was born on 28 March 1928 in Glasgow.

He studied at Glasgow School of Art in the late 1940s and early 1950s where his energy and talent was admired by his contemporaries.

== Career ==
McGrath is best known for his collaborations with The Goon Show stars Peter Sellers and Spike Milligan. He directed the scenes with Sellers and Orson Welles in the multi-director James Bond spoof Casino Royale (1967). He also directed Sellers and Spike Milligan in The Magic Christian (1969) and The Great McGonagall (1974).

McGrath also worked with director Richard Lester on the Beatles' musical-comedy films A Hard Day's Night (1964) and Help! (1965). In November 1965, McGrath directed the Beatles' first-ever music videos (known at the time as "promo clips"), filming the band miming to five of their hit songs, including "Ticket to Ride", "Help!" and "Day Tripper".

In the 2004 film The Life and Death of Peter Sellers, Alan Williams plays the unnamed director of Casino Royale, whom Sellers (played by Geoffrey Rush) calls "Joe".

== Filmography ==
- Justin Thyme (1964, TV)
- Casino Royale (1967)
- 30 Is a Dangerous Age, Cynthia (1968)
- The Goon Show (1968, TV)
- The Bliss of Mrs. Blossom (1968)
- The Magic Christian (1969)
- Digby, the Biggest Dog in the World (1973)
- The Great McGonagall (1974)
- Girls Come First (1975, credited as Croisette Meubles)
- I'm Not Feeling Myself Tonight (1976)
- The Strange Case of the End of Civilization as We Know It (1977)
- The Losers (1978, TV series)
- Rising Damp (1980)
- Goodnight and God Bless (1983, TV series)
- Night Train to Murder (1983, TV)
