= Dennis Wilson (composer) =

British musician (1920–1989)

Dennis Miller Wilson
- Born: 16 February 1920; Leicester, England
- Died: 15 July 1989 (aged 69) Cambridge, England
- Occupations: Musician; composer; conductor; arranger
- Instruments: Piano

Dennis Miller Wilson (16 February 1920 – 15 July 1989) was a British pianist, composer, arranger and conductor who composed the theme music for television sitcoms such as Till Death Us Do Part, Rising Damp and Fawlty Towers.

== Biography ==
During his schooldays in his native town of Leicester, Wilson played the piano for the school orchestra. After leaving school, he played in local bands, and when the Army claimed him in 1939, he was eventually posted to India where, until 1946, he directed the music at one of the garrison theatres.

His next move was to join Harry Parry's Sextet for three years, after which he featured in several of the popular bands of the period, including those of Harry Hayes and Kenny Baker. From 1949, Wilson was freelance with recording, radio and television orchestras, and was also involved with film music.

Wilson was with George Melachrino, Malcolm Lockyer, Peter Yorke and other well-known orchestra leaders, as well as having his own set-up for some popular radio series, such as Educating Archie and Pertwee's Progress. Wilson later joined the BBC Show Band, and in addition played for commercial television. He made numerous recordings playing in combos as trio, quartet, quintet, octet and with his own orchestra.

He was married in 1950, and lived in Beckenham, Kent. He had two children, Nicholas and Penelope. His main hobbies were sailing and gardening. He died on 15 July 1989 in Cambridge.

Wilson composed the theme music for a number of television series and sitcoms:

- Meet the Wife (1963)
- Till Death Us Do Part (1965–1975)
- Marriage Lines (1963–1966)
- Steptoe and Son (incidental music 1970–1974)
- Birds on the Wing (1971)
- My Wife Next Door (1972)
- Rising Damp (1974–1978)
- My Honourable Mrs (1975)
- Fawlty Towers (1975–1979)
- You're Only Young Twice (1977–1981)
