= Frances de la Tour =

English actress (born 1944)

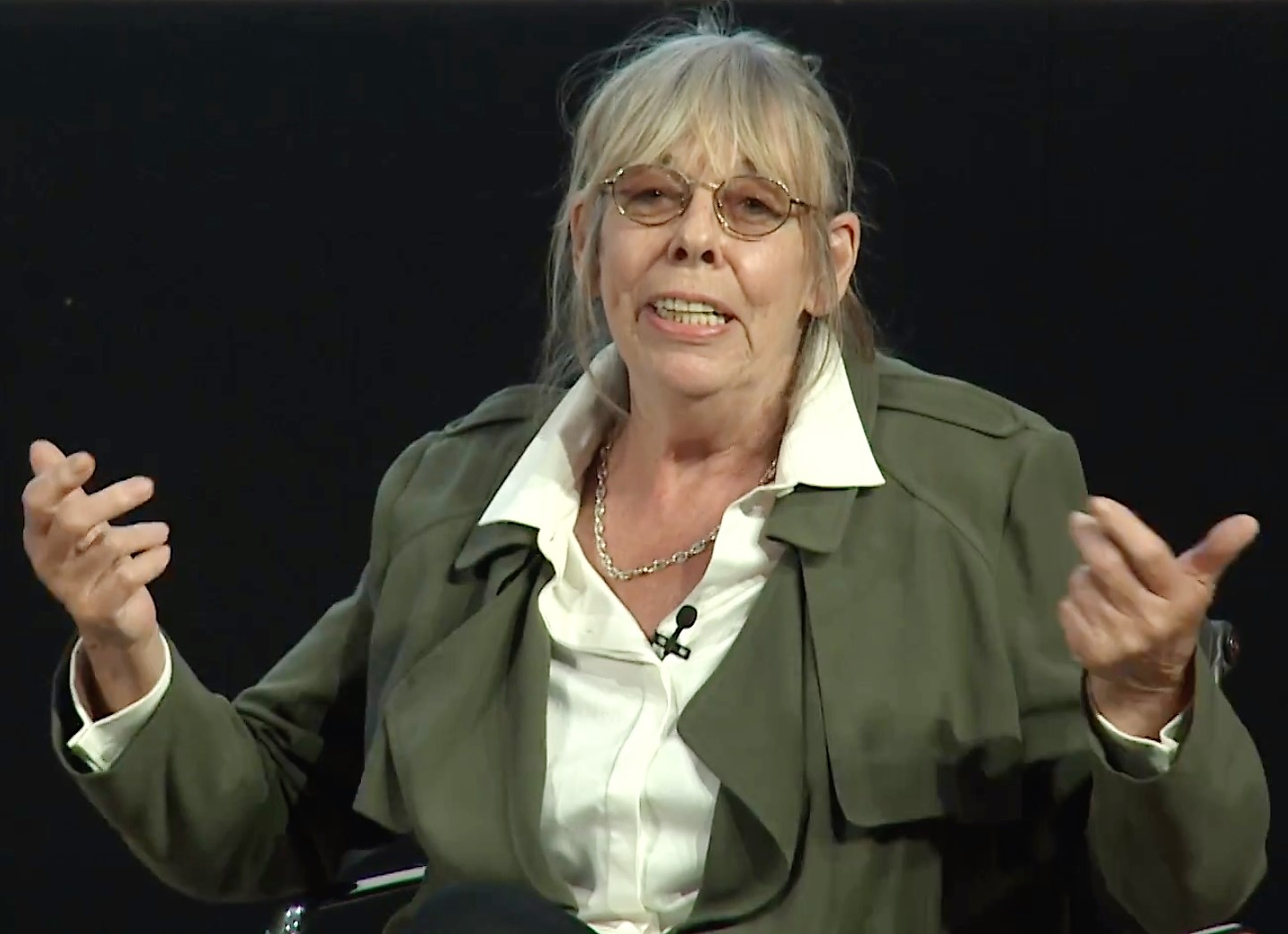
- De la Tour in 2019
- Born: 30 July 1944 (age 82); Bovingdon, Hertfordshire, England
- Occupation: Actress
- Years active: 1965–present
- Spouses: David Godman (m. 1968, divorced) Tom Kempinski (m. 1972; div. 1982)
- Children: 2
- Relatives: Andy de la Tour (brother)

Frances J. de Lautour (born 30 July 1944), better known as Frances de la Tour, is a British actress. A Tony Award winner and three-time Olivier Award winner, she is also known for her roles in the television sitcom Rising Damp and Harry Potter and the Goblet of Fire.

She performed as Mrs. Lintott in the play The History Boys in London and on Broadway, winning the 2006 Tony Award for Best Featured Actress in a Play. She reprised the role in the 2006 film. Her other film roles include Madame Olympe Maxime in Harry Potter and the Goblet of Fire (2005). Television roles include Emma Porlock in the Dennis Potter serial Cold Lazarus (1996), Maud in the miniseries Flickers, headmistress Margaret Baron in BBC sitcom Big School and Violet Crosby in the sitcom Vicious.

== Early life and family ==
De la Tour was born on 30 July 1944 in Bovingdon, Hertfordshire, to Moyra (née Fessas) and Charles de la Tour (1909–1982). The name was also spelled de Lautour, and it was in this form that her birth was registered in the third quarter of 1944. She has English, French, Greek, and Irish ancestry. She was educated at London's Lycée Français and the Drama Centre London.

== Career ==
=== Theatre ===
After leaving drama school, she joined the Royal Shakespeare Company (RSC) in 1965. Over the next six years, she played many small roles with the RSC in a variety of plays, gradually building up to larger parts such as Hoyden in The Relapse and culminating in Peter Brook's acclaimed production of A Midsummer Night's Dream, in which she played Helena as a comic "tour de force".

In the 1970s, she worked steadily both on the stage and on television. Some of her notable appearances were Rosalind in As You Like It at the Playhouse, Oxford in 1975 and Isabella in The White Devil at the Old Vic in 1976. She enjoyed a collaboration with Stepney's Half Moon Theatre, appearing in the London première of Dario Fo's We Can't Pay? We Won't Pay (1978), Eleanor Marx's Landscape of Exile (1979), and in the title role of Hamlet (1980).

In 1980, she played Stephanie, the violinist with multiple sclerosis in Duet for One, a play written for her by her then husbamd Tom Kempinski, for which she won the Olivier for Best Actress. She played Sonya in Uncle Vanya opposite Donald Sinden at the Theatre Royal, Haymarket in 1982. Her performance as Josie in Eugene O'Neill's A Moon for the Misbegotten won her another Olivier for Best Actress in 1983. She joined the Royal National Theatre for the title role in Saint Joan in 1984 and appeared there in Brighton Beach Memoirs in 1986. She again won the Olivier, this time for Best Supporting Actress for Martin Sherman's play about Isadora Duncan, When She Danced, with Vanessa Redgrave at the Globe Theatre in 1991 and played Leo in Les Parents terribles at the Royal National Theatre in 1994, earning another Olivier nomination.

In 1994, de la Tour co-starred with Maggie Smith in Edward Albee's Three Tall Women at the Wyndham's and with Alan Howard in Albee's The Play About the Baby at the Almeida in 1998. In 1999, she returned to the RSC to play Cleopatra opposite Alan Bates in Antony and Cleopatra, in which she did a nude walk across the stage. In 2004, she played Mrs. Lintott in Alan Bennett's The History Boys at the National and later on Broadway, winning both a Drama Desk Award and a Tony Award for Best Featured Actress in a Play. She would also later appear in the film version. In December 2005, she appeared in the London production of the highly acclaimed anti-Iraq War one-woman play Peace Mom by Dario Fo, based on the writings of Cindy Sheehan. In 2007, she appeared in a West End revival of the farce Boeing-Boeing. In 2009, she appeared in Alan Bennett's new play The Habit of Art at the National. In 2012, she returned to the National in her third Bennett premiere, People.

=== Film and television ===
Her many television appearances during the 1980s and 1990s include the 1980 miniseries Flickers opposite Bob Hoskins, the TV version of Duet for One, for which she received a BAFTA nomination, the series A Kind of Living (1988–89), Dennis Potter's Cold Lazarus (1996), and Tom Jones (1997). Of all her TV roles, however, she is best known for playing spinster Ruth Jones in the successful Yorkshire Television comedy Rising Damp, from 1974 to 1978. De la Tour told Richard Webber, who wrote a 2001 book about the series, that Ruth Jones "was an interesting character to play. We laughed a lot on set, but comedy is a serious business, and Leonard took it particularly seriously, and rightly so. Comedy, which is so much down to timing, is exhausting work. But it was a happy time." Upon reprising her Rising Damp role in the 1980 film version, she won Best Actress at the Evening Standard British Film Awards.

In the mid-1980s, de la Tour was considered, along with Joanna Lumley and Dawn French, as a replacement for Colin Baker on Doctor Who. The idea was scrapped and the job was given to Sylvester McCoy.

In 2003, de la Tour played a terminally ill gay woman in the film Love Actually with the actress Anne Reid, although her scenes were cut from the film's theatrical release and appear only on the DVD.

In 2005, she portrayed Olympe Maxime, headmistress of Beauxbatons Academy, in Harry Potter and the Goblet of Fire. In 2010, she reprised Maxime as a cameo in Harry Potter and the Deathly Hallows Part 1. Notable television roles during this time include Agatha Christie's Poirot: Death on the Nile (2004), Waking the Dead (2004), the black comedy Sensitive Skin (2005), with Joanna Lumley and Denis Lawson, Agatha Christie's Marple: The Moving Finger (2006) and New Tricks as a rather morbid Egyptologist, also in 2006.

She was nominated for the 2006 BAFTA Award for Actress in a Supporting Role for her work on the film version of The History Boys.

She later appeared in several well-received films, including Tim Burton's 2010 Alice in Wonderland as Aunt Imogene, a delusional aunt of Alice's, opposite Johnny Depp, Anne Hathaway, Helena Bonham Carter, and Mia Wasikowska and a supporting role in the film The Book of Eli, directed by the Hughes brothers. In 2012, she appeared in the film Hugo.

Until 2012, she was also a patron for the performing arts group Theatretrain.

From 2013 to 2016, de la Tour played the role of Violet Crosby in ITV sitcom Vicious with Ian McKellen and Derek Jacobi.

From 2013 to 2014, she portrayed headmistress Ms Baron in the BBC One sitcom Big School.

In April 2016, she joined the second series of Outlander as Mother Hildegarde.

In 2021, de la Tour appeared in an ITV production, initially released on BritBox - Professor T. - in which she played the mother of the titular character.

== Personal life ==
She is the sister of actor and screenwriter Andy de la Tour.

An episode of the BBC series Who Do You Think You Are?, first broadcast on 22 October 2015, revealed de la Tour to be a descendant of the aristocratic Delaval family.

Politically, de la Tour is a socialist and was a member of the Workers' Revolutionary Party in the 1970s.

== Acting credits ==
=== Film ===
Year	Title	Role	Notes
1970	Country Dance	District Nurse	
1970	Every Home Should Have One	Maud Crape	
1972	Our Miss Fred	Miss Lockhart	
1976	To the Devil a Daughter	Salvation Army Major	
1977	Wombling Free	Julia Frogmorton	
1980	Rising Damp	Miss Ruth Jones	Evening Standard British Film Award for Best Actress
1990	Strike It Rich	Mrs. De Vere	
1999	The Cherry Orchard	Charlotte Ivanova	
2005	Harry Potter and the Goblet of Fire	Madame Olympe Maxime	
2006	The History Boys	Dorothy Lintott	Nominated – BAFTA Award for Best Actress in a Supporting Role; Nominated – British Independent Film Awards
2010	The Book of Eli	Martha	
2010	Alice in Wonderland	Aunt Imogene	
2010	Harry Potter and the Deathly Hallows – Part 1	Madame Olympe Maxime	Cameo
2010	The Nutcracker in 3D	The Rat Queen/Housekeeper	
2011	Hugo	Madame Emile	
2012	Private Peaceful	Grandma Wolf	
2014	Into the Woods	The Giantess	
2015	Mr. Holmes	Madame Schirmer	
2015	Survivor	Sally	
2015	The Lady in the Van	Ursula Vaughan Williams	
2015	Miss You Already	Jill	
2020	Dolittle	Dragon (voice)	
2020	Enola Holmes	The Dowager	

=== Television ===
Year	Title	Role	Notes
1970	NBC Experiment in Television	Relief Secretary	Episode: "The Engagement"
1971	The Marty Feldman Comedy Machine	Various	2 episodes
1974-1976	Play for Today	Maria/Marcia	2 episodes
1974–1978	Rising Damp	Miss Ruth Jones	
1976	Crown Court	Anne Schofield	Serial: "Pigmented Patter"
1977	Maggie: It's Me	Maggie	Pilot
1979	Leave it to Charlie	Miss Grimshaw	Episode: "...And Harry's Just Wild About Me"
1980	Flickers	Maud Cole	Miniseries
1982	ITV Playhouse	Jean	Episode: "Skirmishes"
1983	The Bounder	Celia	Episode: "Matchmaker"
1984	Ellis Island	Millie Renfew	1 episode
1985	Murder with Mirrors	Miss Bellaver	TV film
1988	A Kind of Living	Carol Beasley	
1993	Stay Lucky	Paddy Bysouth	Episode: "One Jump Ahead"
1994	Downwardly Mobile	Rosemary	
1996	Cold Lazarus	Emma Porlock	Miniseries
1997	The History of Tom Jones: A Foundling	Aunt Western	Miniseries
1998	Heartbeat	Tessa	Episode: "Bad Penny"
2003	Born and Bred	Eugenia Maddox	2 episodes
2004	Agatha Christie's Poirot	Salome Otterbourne	Episode: "Death on the Nile"
2004	Waking the Dead	Alice Taylor-Garrett	Episode: "False Flag"
2005	Sensitive Skin	Sarah Thorne	1 episode
2006	Agatha Christie's Marple	Mrs. Maud Dane Calthrop	Episode: The Moving Finger
2006	New Tricks	Professor Styles	Episode: "Old Dogs"
2006	3 Ibs	Dr. Haliday	Episode: "The Cutting Edge"
2013-2014	Big School	Ms. Baron	
2013-2016	Vicious	Violet Crosby	
2016	Outlander	Mother Hildegarde	4 episodes
2016	The Collection	Yvette Sabine	Miniseries
2017	Man in an Orange Shirt	Mrs. March	1 episode
2017	The Highway Rat	The Rabbit	Voice
2018	Vanity Fair	Lady Matilda Crawley	3 episodes
2021	The Prince	Queen Elizabeth II (voice)	Miniseries
2021-present	Professor T.	Adelaide Tempest	

=== Theatre ===
Year	Title	Role(s)	Notes	Ref.
1965	Timon of Athens	unnamed parts		
1965	Hamlet	unnamed parts		
1966	The Government Inspector	Avdotya, Wife		
1966	Henry IV, Part 1	unnamed parts		
1966	Twelfth Night	unnamed parts		
1966	Henry V	Alice		
1966	The Proposal	Natalyia Stepanovna		
1967	The Taming of the Shrew	Nicholas, Widow		
1967	As You Like It	Audrey		
1967	The Relapse	Miss Hoyden		
1969	Dutch Uncle	Doris Hoyden		
1969	A Midsummer Night's Dream	Helena		
1970	Doctor Faustus	Devil		
1970	Hamlet	Player Queen		
1971	A Midsummer Night's Dream	Helena	Broadway debut	
1971	The Man of Mode	Bellinda		
1971	The Balcony	Bishop's girl		
1973	The Banana Box	Ruth Jones		
1975	The Vegetable; or, From President to Postman	Charlotte		
1975	As You Like It	Rosalind		
1979	Hamlet	Hamlet		
1980	Duet for One	Stephanie Anderson		
1982	Uncle Vanya	Sonya		
1983	A Moon for the Misbegotten	Josie Hogan		
1984	Saint Joan	St. Joan		
1985	The Dance of Death	Alice		
1989	King Lear	Regan		
1989	Chekhov's Women	performer		
1991	When She Danced	Miss Belzer		
1994	Three Tall Women	Middle Tall Woman		
1998	The Play About the Baby	Woman		
1999	The Forest	Raisa Pavlovna Gurmyzhskaya		
1999	Antony and Cleopatra	Cleopatra		
2000	Fallen Angels	Jane Banbury		
2001	The Good Hope	Kitty		
2003	The Dance of Death	Alice		
2004	The History Boys	Mrs. Lintott		
2007	Boeing-Boeing	Bertha		
2009	The Habit of Art	Stage Manager		
2012	People	Dorothy		

== Awards and nominations ==
Year	Award	Category	Nominated work	Result
1980	Olivier Award	Actress of the Year in a New Play	Duet for One	Won
1980	Evening Standard Film Award	Best Actress	Rising Damp	Won
1983	Olivier Award	Actress of the Year in a Revival	A Moon for the Misbegotten	Won
1986	BAFTA TV Award	Best Actress	Duet for One	Nominated
1992	Olivier Award	Best Supporting Actress	When She Danced	Won
1995	Olivier Award	Best Actress	Les Parents Terribles	Nominated
2006	Drama Desk Award	Outstanding Featured Actress in a Play	The History Boys	Won
2006	Tony Award	Best Featured Actress in a Play	The History Boys	Won
2006	British Independent Film Award	Best Actress	The History Boys	Nominated
2007	BAFTA Film Award	Best Supporting Actress	The History Boys	Nominated
2014	BAFTA TV Award	Best Female Comedy Performance	Vicious	Nominated
