= Strongroom (film) =

1962 British film by Vernon Sewell

- Theatrical release poster
- Directed by: Vernon Sewell
- Written by: Richard Harris; Max Marquis
- Story by: Richard Harris
- Produced by: Guido Coen
- Starring: Derren Nesbitt; Colin Gordon; Ann Lynn
- Cinematography: Basil Emmott
- Edited by: John Trumper
- Music by: Johnny Gregory
- Production company: Theatrecraft
- Distributed by: Bryanston Films (UK)
- Release date: May 1962 (UK)
- Running time: 80 minutes
- Country: United Kingdom
- Language: English
- Budget: £17,000

Strongroom is a 1962 British crime drama b-film directed by Vernon Sewell and starring Derren Nesbitt, Colin Gordon and Ann Lynn. A group of criminals lock two bank employees in a safe during a robbery.

== Plot ==
Three small-time crooks, Griff, Len and Len's brother Alec, hold up a bank just after closing time on a Saturday preceding an Easter Monday bank holiday.

The stuffy bank manager, Mr Spencer, and his secretary, Rose are locked in the bank's airtight vault, or "Strongroom" by the crooks when two cleaners unexpectedly arrive. The robbers escape but realise that they face possible murder convictions as the bank will be closed for days and the two employees will suffocate. The crooks improvise a plan to leave the keys to the vault in a telephone box and alert the police by an anonymous phone call. Alec has this task. He is seen driving off but is killed in a road accident. Griff and Len receive a knock on the door from the police. The news of Len's brother's death is given. Len panics at news of his brother's death but blames the two bank employees, vowing not to help Griff in helping to release them.

Meanwhile, in the vault the two are calculating their length of air supply: a maximum of 12 hours if they conserve their breath... they will not live until Tuesday morning when the vault is opened. They hope someone will rescue them. However, the manager's friends, who he had agreed to meet up him at the bank, left when seeing his car gone and have started their round of golf without him. Rose's family believe her to be away (alone) for the weekend.

Len tries to retrieve his dead brother's belongings from the coroner's assistant but gets angry when told that the items, which include the strongroom keys, cannot be returned until the police give permission to do so. The duo decide to get hold of an oxyacetylene torch and try their best to break through to the suffocating bank workers (Griff having persuaded Len that, by not doing so, they're essentially putting their own necks on the block). In the meantime, having been contacted by the coroner's assistant, the police sergeant spots that the dead brother's belongings include a strongroom key, something a car-breaker shouldn't possess. The police track down the maker of the key and he advises them to which bank it belongs. The police initially suspect the bank manager of absconding, but it is pointed out that no bank employee should ever have both keys – and therefore something is very amiss.

The police catch Len and Griff boring a hole in the strongroom door. When the boys explain that they're trying to free the workers trapped inside, reluctant at first, the Inspector agrees to let them continue. The duo get an air line through the door but their relief is shattered when, though the vault is opened and the bank manager taken out (barely alive), a police officer states "This one (Rose) is DEAD sir!" The look from Griff and Len sums up the impending doom for the pair, as murder was a capital offence at that time in the UK.

== Cast ==
- Derren Nesbitt as Griff
- Colin Gordon as Mr. Spencer
- Ann Lynn as Rose Taylor
- Keith Faulkner as Len Warren
- W. Morgan Sheppard as Alec Warren
- Hilda Fenemore as charlady
- Diana Chesney as charlady
- Jack Stewart as Sergeant McIntyre
- Colin Rix as P.C. Harper
- Ian Colin as Creighton
- John Chappell as John Musgrove
- Pamela Conway as secretary
- Colin Tapley as Haynes
- Kevin Stoney as police sergeant
- Duncan Lewis as Charlie, mortuary attendant

== Production ==
Filming took place at Twickenham Studios in late 1961. Sewell called it "a terrific movie."

== Critical reception ==
The Monthly Film Bulletin wrote:

Allowing that the plot is improbably "loaded" and coincidental, this sharp, brisk thriller is a soundly entertaining job of minor film-making. With the same director, Vernon Sewell, and young players, Derren Nesbitt and Keith Faulkner, it works up as credible a suspense as that other commendable second feature, The Man In The Back Seat [1961]. The characters of the young crooks are particularly well drawn, though the duologues between the bank-manager and his secretary (the admirable Ann Lynn) tend to be strained. But the three threads of the drama are neatly developed and the last shot has a shock impact which is positively masterly.

The Radio Times wrote, "director Vernon Sewell sets up this improbable story quite neatly, but it's hardly breathless entertainment."

TV Guide called the film "a suspenseful, taut crime drama".

British film critic Leslie Halliwell said: "Suspenseful second feature with gloss and pace."

Chibnall and McFarlane in The British 'B' Film called the film an "excellent race-against-time thriller."

The British Film Institute called it "Sewell's most wholly achieved film."
