= Come Back Peter =

Come Back Peter may refer to:

- Come Back Peter (1969 film), a British sex comedy film
- Come Back Peter (1952 film), a British comedy film
