= Dee Shipman =

English musical artist (1942–2020)

- Occupations: Songwriter, actress, singer
- Years active: 1962–2020
- Labels: Decca

Dee Shipman (born Deanna Pauline Shenderey, September 1942 - 11 June 2020) was a songwriter who worked with Charles Aznavour and Petula Clark. Together with Clark, she wrote the 1990 West End musical Someone Like You.

== Career ==
=== Early acting and singing ===
Shipman began her professional career as an actress and singer, both in the theatre, and on TV, where she appeared in series such as The Avengers (Propellant 23) and Emergency - Ward 10. She then went on to a successful career in radio, including co-presenting a weekly series for the BBC Teen Scene, and having two series of her own for Radio Luxembourg, Ready Steady Radio and Kids Like Us. During this period, Shipman was signed to Decca Records, and released a cover of Mel Tormé’s hit "Comin' Home Baby" under the name Deanna Shenderey. She also wrote for the magazine Pop Weekly, in which she had her own weekly column.

As a singer, Shipman recorded a twelve track LP, produced by Norman Newell. The album featured such evergreen standards as "What Are You Doing the Rest of Your Life?", "The Way You Look Tonight" and "One Hand, One Heart". The album was released in July 2008 by Stage Door Records. Titled She Isn't Me, the reissue concludes with a new recording from Shipman and Roger Webb's musical Emma.

Shipman made several films, which included starring as Mrs. Burke in the 1972 motion picture Burke And Hare opposite Harry Andrews and Derren Nesbitt, and which she described as "Glamorous no! Culture no! But fun? YES!"

=== Songwriting ===
Shipman first started writing lyrics when she began her song-writing collaboration with composer Roger Webb. Their output included writing "Sad Song Lady" for Blossom Dearie, "The Rainbow Bridge" for Danny Williams and "Making It By Myself" for the Kenneth Tynan and Clifford Williams musical Carte Blanche at the Phoenix Theatre in London. The show was not well reviewed, but the song got good notices.

Shipman and Webb also composed music and lyrics for three musical concepts: A Kid For Two Farthings (based on the 1955 film of the Wolf Mankowitz modern classic story); The Last Touring Love Show; and Emma (based on the life of Emma Hamilton).

Shipman went on to write songs with Marc Wilkinson (for the nude review Carte Blanche, 1976), Werner Becker, George Garvarentz, Albert Van Dam, Ralph Lewin and Herbert Chappell.

==== Collaborations with Charles Aznavour and Petula Clark ====
In 1976, Shipman began an important partnership with Charles Aznavour, which continued into their latter years. Their songwriting together produced the Aznavour favourite "Pretty Shitty Days", as well as "A Very Private Christmas" and "You Make Me Hungry For Your Loving" amongst many others. It was Aznavour who introduced Shipman to Petula Clark; Shipman and Clark wrote their first song together in 1978, and remained friends and partners. The Clark – Shipman partnership produced the original stage musical Someone Like You, which toured the United Kingdom and transferred to the West End in 1990. Shipman and Clark also wrote over 50 songs together for Clark's commercial albums and singles plus their second, uncompleted musical Zola, based on the life of Émile Zola. Two songs from the score can be heard on the CD In Her Own Write, released by Sepia Records in 2007.

In 1989, while continuing to write all Aznavour's English lyrics, and also working on two musicals with Clark, Shipman wrote the script and co-produced the TV docudrama Petain, charting the life of Philippe Pétain. The film featured Harry Andrews as Petain, in his last film role. (Portions of the film's score, composed by Clark, can be heard on In Her Own Write.)

Aznavour and Shipman together also devised and wrote the songs for a musical workshop of Molly Bloom's Soliloquy from James Joyce’s Ulysses, which was performed at the Edinburgh International Festival by Eartha Kitt.

Aznavour's musical Lautrec, with English lyrics by Shipman, premiered at the Theatre Royal, Plymouth in March 2000 before transferring to the Shaftesbury Theatre, London. The duo were said to be working together on several new songs to have been included in a US and Canadian production of the show.

== Neuro-linguistic programming ==
Shipman was a NLP (Neuro-linguistic programming) Master Coach, Trainer, and Master Practitioner, and a partner with Paul Jacobs in New Oceans. Together they ran regular Life, Business, Education, Coaching, and Performing & Creative Arts trainings, workshops, and seminars, and were also successful life coaches.

In 2006, Shipman and Wes McGhee co-wrote the CD NLP Songs For Change, a musical introduction to the tools and techniques of NLP.

Shipman also wrote three books of short stories, based on her NLP experiences: The Sunbeam Collection Vol.1, The Sunbeam Collection Vol.2, and All We Are Is Our Stories. Vol.1 Prior to her death, she was writing Volume 2 of the latter title, and also working on The Book Of Inspirational Parenting.

== Personal life and death ==
Shipman died on 11 June 2020.
