= Tom Clegg =

Tom Clegg may refer to:

- Tom Clegg (director) (1934–2016), British television and film director
- Tom Clegg (actor) (1915–1996), English actor
