= Burke & Hare (1972 film) =

1972 British horror film by Vernon Sewell

- Directed by: Vernon Sewell
- Screenplay by: Ernle Bradford
- Produced by: Guido Coen
- Starring: Derren Nesbitt; Harry Andrews; Glynn Edwards; Yootha Joyce; Françoise Pascal
- Cinematography: Desmond Dickinson
- Edited by: John Colville
- Music by: Roger Webb
- Production companies: Armitage Films; Kenneth Shipman Productions
- Distributed by: United Artists Corporation (Theatrical, UK); New World Pictures (Theatrical, US)
- Release dates: 3 February 1972 (London, UK)
- Running time: 91 minutes
- Country: United Kingdom
- Language: English

Burke & Hare (also known as Burke and Hare, The Horrors of Burke and Hare and The Body Snatchers) is a 1972 British horror film directed by Vernon Sewell and starring Derren Nesbitt, Harry Andrews, and Glynn Edwards. It is based on the true story of the Burke and Hare murders, and was the last film to be directed by Sewell.

== Plot ==
In Edinburgh, in 1828, there are two sides to society: men living in dirty hovels and grave robbing to make a living; and rich men going to the brothels. Meanwhile, the doctors dine together and drink wine. Surgeon Dr Robert Knox needs bodies for dissection to satisfy the training needs of his medical students. As only hanging victims may be used, bodies are in short supply. In order to serve the greater good of medical science he employs grave-robbers Burke and Hare to supply fresh corpses for his anatomical lectures at the medical academy. The authorities turn a blind eye knowing that stemming the crime would lessen the medical training.The pair of "resurrectionists" are paid £7 10s for their first body – a truly large sum at that time.

The students in the anatomy theatre appreciate Knox's lectures and demonstrations. However, when graveyard supplies run low, the industrious pair turn to murder to keep the business going and simply claim to have robbed the bodies. They start with the poor people who co-habit their lodging house on West Port, and these people might have legitimately died. Due to greed they gradually get bolder picking younger victims. Their wives are aware of the murders and indeed encourage and watch the crimes.

But when Mrs Hare brings Daft Jamie home to murder things start to go wrong as Jamie is well known. When his body reaches Knox it is seen Jamie has been in a fight. Two of the city guard arrive looking for Jamie. Knox destroys Jamie's head and tells the guards it is a boy killed in a factory accident.

The local brothel burns down and the girls need to find new accommodation. Prostitute Marie and her friend meet Burke in a bar who offers them accommodation. Marie fails to turn up for her rendezvous with her medical student lover, who is shocked when he sees her next on the anatomy table. He asks to speak to Knox. Knox tells the student that he did an autopsy and she died of alcoholism.

The student sneaks into Knox's private dissection room at night. He then goes to Madame Thompson and tells her Marie is dead. She directs him to a tavern in the West Port. Meanwhile, in the tavern Burke meets an old match-seller, Mary Docherty. He takes her back to his house at Tanners Close to join their Halloween party. A drunken fight breaks out as the student arrives having tracked them down. He calls the City Guard who break up the fight and find the dead body of Mary Docherty.

A voice over explains what then happened to each character.

== Cast ==
- Derren Nesbitt as Burke
- Harry Andrews as Dr Knox
- Glynn Edwards as Hare
- Yootha Joyce as Mrs Hare
- Françoise Pascal as Marie
- Yutte Stensgaard as Janet
- Robin Hawdon as Lord Angus McPhee
- Alan Tucker as Arbuthnot
- Dee Shenderey as Mrs Burke
- Joan Carol as Madame Thompson, owner of the brothel
- Paul Greaves as Ferguson
- David Pugh as Daft Jamie
- James Hayter as Dr Selby
- Thomas Heathcote as Knox's assistant, Paterson
- Duncan Lamont as Dr Saint
- Madoline Thomas as Mary Docherty
- Reg Lye as Old Joe

== Production ==
Vernon Sewell had a script written by Ernie Bradford and said Kenneth Shipman wanted to make it. Shipman suggested parts be played by Sewell's wife Joan and Shipman's girlfriend Dee. Sewell says Dee was not up to the role but could not fire her. He added, "Anyhow, the film is made and I cut it and cut a lot of her out you see, of course. I cut it myself. And I put on a guide track and of music by Shostakovich and, music that suited the movie."

Sewell says Columbia offered to screen it but Shipman arranged a deal with someone to buy out the movie which hey took. "Of course, I agree," he said. "Nothing happens. To make a long story short, a year goes by and nothing happens. In the meantime they have re-cut the picture and put back all her scenes and cut out all my wife's scenes, put her back in, and got a pop group to do the music! You couldn't have had anything more unsuitable! There is an historical film of rather morbid – and you have pop music! It couldn't have been more unsuitable. Well then they take it – after a year, they take it back to Columbia and Columbia said, "Well, it's not Vernon's movie any more." They said, "We'll take it," but on ridiculous terms, "We'll take it and give you a two week's West End run." And it opens up at the Pavilion, Piccadilly, and the power cuts come and nobody goes to the cinema! The result is, of course, I got nothing out of the movie at all. Nothing."

It was shot at Twickenham Studios in London. The film's sets were designed by the art director Scott MacGregor.

== Theme song ==
The eponymous theme song, which opens and closes the film, was written by Roger Webb with lyrics by Norman Newell, and performed by English comedy/musical trio The Scaffold, with uncredited vocal assistance by Vivian Stanshall.

== Critical reception ==
The Monthly Film Bulletin wrote:

It's sad to see the talents of Vernon Sewell (he was responsible for such fine thrillers as The Man in the Back Seat [1961] and House of Mystery [1961]) being frittered away on a project as incoherent as this one. Unlike John Gilling's excellent treatment of the same subject in The Flesh and the Fiends [1960], Ernle Bradford's screenplay seems less concerned with Dr. Knox's character than with presenting a series of anaemic fetishistic interludes in the local brothel. Burke and Hare themselves are reduced from the memorable psychotic fiends of Gilling's film to a pair of garrulous Irish comedians, while the Scottish accents affected by most of the minor players are somewhat on the level of Home Counties amateur dramatics. Admittedly, there is some compensation in the glimpses of Dr. Knox's milieu, which allows Sewell to exercise some of his old flair for eccentricity and atmosphere. And Harry Andrews gives one of his best performances to date as Knox, a sinister but dedicated old man whose pompous delight in the more gruesome details of medicine contains something of what the film might have been.

Allmovie wrote, "the producers opted for sexploitation over gruesome horror, but the end result is decidedly dull."

The Radio Times said, "the accent is on sleazy sexploitation and bawdy comedy rather than anything truly macabre or frightening. Arguably the worst film adaptation of the exploits of the notorious West Port serial killers."

British film critic Leslie Halliwell said: "Depressing in its childish attempts to be gruesome and perverted."

== See also ==
- The Greed of William Hart (1948)
- The Flesh and the Fiends (1960)
- The Doctor and the Devils (1985)
- Burke & Hare (Comedy, 2010)
