= David Dixon (actor) =

British actor and screenwriter (born 1947)

- Born: 28 October 1947 (age 79); Derby, England
- Occupation: Actor
- Years active: 1970–present

David Dixon (born 28 October 1947) is an English actor and screenwriter. His credits include A Family at War (1970), Escort Girls (1974), The Sweeney (episode "Big Brother", 1975), The Legend of Robin Hood (1975), Rock Follies (1976), A Horseman Riding By (1978), Lillie (1978), The Tempest (1980), The Missionary (1982), Cold Warrior (1984), Tutti Frutti (1987), Circles of Deceit: Dark Secret (1995), A Touch of Frost: Fun Times for Swingers (1996), and Original Sin (1996). However, his most notable role was starring as Ford Prefect in the 1981 BBC TV series The Hitchhiker's Guide to the Galaxy (1981).

== Early life ==
David Dixon was born 28 October 1947 in Derby and lived there until the family moved to Normanton in 1959.

== Career ==
In 1975, he starred as Prince John in the BBC serial The Legend of Robin Hood, alongside Diane Keen and Paul Darrow. He played Ariel in the 1980 BBC version of The Tempest, directed by John Gorrie.

His most notable role was in the 1981 BBC TV series The Hitchhiker's Guide to the Galaxy, based on the book of the same name by Douglas Adams, in which Dixon starred as Ford Prefect, alongside Simon Jones, who played Arthur Dent, and Sandra Dickinson, who played Trillian. He later rejoined the Hitchhiker's Guide by lending his voice to the "Ecological Man" and the "Zirzla Leader" in Fit the Twentieth of the radio series, while Geoffrey McGivern, who had originally played the character on radio, returned to the role of Ford.

In 1982, he appeared in the British comedy film The Missionary (1982), alongside Michael Palin, Michael Horden, Maggie Smith, Denholm Elliott, and David Suchet. In 1987, he appeared in the episode "Love Hurts" of the Bafta award winning show Tutti Frutti (1987), alongside Robbie Coltrane and Emma Thompson.

In 2010, he was a contestant on Pointless Celebrities. In 2016, he was in the BBC documentary Living in 66 talking to former drama student colleague Robert Lindsay.

== Filmography ==
- Z-Cars (1969) - Rob (2 episodes)
- A Family at War (1970) (TV series) – Robert Ashton (7 episodes)
- On the House (1971) Ronald
- Escort Girls (1974) – Hugh Lloyd
- The Sweeney (episode "Big Brother", 1975) (TV) - Andy Deacon
- Jumping Bean Bag (1976, in (BBC TV Play For Today) – Ozymandias Freemantle
- The Legend of Robin Hood (1975) (miniseries) – Prince John
- Rock Follies (1976) (TV series) - PR Man
- A Horseman Riding By (1978) (miniseries) – Keith Horsey
- Lillie (1978) (miniseries) – Prince Leopold
- A Family Affair (1979) (miniseries) – Clifford
- The Tempest (1980) (TV) – Ariel
- The Hitchhiker's Guide to the Galaxy (1981) (miniseries) – Ford Prefect
- The Missionary (1982) – Young Man
- Cold Warrior (1984) (miniseries)
- Tutti Frutti (1987), (TV) – Stuart Gordon Inverarrity
- Circles of Deceit: Dark Secret (1995) (TV) – DI Ransome
- A Touch of Frost: Fun Times for Swingers (1996) (TV) – Barry Curzon
- Original Sin (1996) (TV) – Dr Wardle
- The Bill (1997), series 13 episode 77 "Too Much to Lose" - Brian Vaughan
