= Reed De Rouen =

American actor and screenwriter (1917–1986)

- De Rouen in Man in a Suitcase (1968)
- Born: June 10, 1917; Green Bay, Wisconsin, US
- Died: June 11, 1986 (aged 69); London, England
- Occupations: Actor; screenwriter
- Notable work: Doctor Who

Reed De Rouen (June 10, 1917 – June 11, 1986) was an American actor and screenwriter who worked mostly in the British film and television industry. He appeared in the Doctor Who serial The Gunfighters in 1966 as Pa Clanton, as well as writing the script for the proposed Doctor Who story "The Spare Part People" with Jon Pertwee.

== Filmography ==
- The Third Man (1949) – American Military Policeman at Railroad Station (uncredited)
- The Strangers Came (1949) – Manager
- The Six Men (1951) – Lewis
- Lady in the Fog (1952) – Connors – the thug
- Top Secret (1952) – 1st U.S. Soldier
- Sea Devils (1953) – Customs Man (uncredited)
- The One That Got Away (1957) – Canadian Truck Driver (uncredited)
- The Sheriff of Fractured Jaw (1958) – Clayborne
- Naked Fury (1959) – Eddy
- John Paul Jones (1959) – Joseph Hawes
- Murder at Site 3 (1959) – McGill
- There Was a Crooked Man (1960) – Dutchman
- The Hand (1960) – Michael Brodie
- Man Who Couldn't Walk (1960) – Luigi
- The Traitors (1962)
- Billion Dollar Brain (1967) – 1st Observer
- The Revolutionary (1970) – Mayor
- You Can't Win 'Em All (1970) – U.S. Navy CPO (uncredited)
- Baxter! (1973) – Poker player (final film role)
