= Screamtime =

- Promotional poster
- Directed by: Michael Armstrong; Stanley A. Long
- Written by: Michael Armstrong
- Produced by: Peter Long; Stanley A. Long
- Starring: Jean Anderson; Robin Bailey; Dora Bryan; Ann Lynn; Yvonne Nicholson; Ian Saynor; David Van Day
- Cinematography: Don Lord; Alan Pudney; Mike Spera
- Music by: KPM Music Library
- Production company: Manson International
- Release date: 1983
- Running time: 89 minutes
- Countries: United Kingdom, United States
- Language: English

Screamtime is a 1983 British-American horror anthology film directed by Michael Armstrong and Stanley A. Long (dually credited as Al Beresford), written by Armstrong, and starring Jean Anderson, Robin Bailey, Dora Bryan, Ann Lynn, Yvonne Nicholson, Ian Saynor, and David Van Day. It was produced by Peter Long and Stanley A. Long. Presented as an anthology with a wrap-around story, the film opens with a pair of young men stealing three videotapes, which happen to each contain a tale of terror. The first story is about an evil puppeteer, the second is a haunted house story, and the third is about a caretaker in a haunted garden.

The films second segment, "Dreamhouse", was remade and expanded to a feature-length film in 2010 as Psychosis, starring Charisma Carpenter.

== Plot ==
=== Prologue ===
Two men, Ed and Bruce, steal videotapes from a video store in Times Square. They then begin watching the tapes at their friend Marie's apartment.

=== Killer Punch ===
Jack Grimshaw is an old puppeteer who lives in a seaside town, where he puts on Punch and Judy shows at the beach. His wife, Lena, and stepson, Damien, are disapproving of his lifestyle, and plan on leaving him and moving in with her relatives in Canada.

Jack is putting on a Punch and Judy show, when Damien, his girlfriend, Suzy, and his friends arrive. Damien mocks the puppets before stealing them, getting injured in the scuffle with Jack trying to get them back. Angered, Damien burns down the puppet stall, much to the shock of his friends and Suzy.

While walking home, Suzy berates Damien’s treatment of his stepfather, while her boyfriend remains unsympathetic. Later, while walking along the seaside, Damien is murdered by an unseen assailant, who beats him to death with a wooden plank.

Back at home, Jack begs Lena not to move away, but she remains insistent, adding that she’d change her mind if he gets rid of the puppets.

In the middle of the night, Jack hears the Mr Punch puppet calling to him, and goes to investigate. Lena is then killed by the same assailant, now imitating the Punch puppet. Jack finds the body, then calls the local doctor over. He tells the doctor he has heard the killer’s voice, then warns him he is in danger, as the order of deaths in the Punch and Judy shows is the same: “first the baby, then Judy, then it’s always the doctor”.

While the doctor attempts to phone the police, he is killed by the unknown assailant, now wearing the Punch handpuppet. In the morning, Suzy comes over, having grown worried when Damien never showed up the previous day. While searching the house, she finds the bodies in an upstairs room. When she tries to leave, she is attacked by Jack, who developed the murderous Punch as a split personality.

He chases her around the industrial district, eventually meeting his end when Suzy pushes him over the railing into a garbage truck’s compactor. He is thus “eaten by the dragon”, as ends the Punch and Judy shows.

Back in the apartment, the female friend, Marie, leaves to get dressed. Ed changes the videotape while Bruce expresses interest in Marie. They then start watching the next tape.

=== Dream House ===
A married couple, Sue and Tony move into a house. Shortly after, Sue starts having visions which only she can see, including of a boy riding a bicycle in the yard and a young man painting the inside of the house. These visions soon include seeing a knife wielding maniac. The visions increase in intensity, leading Sue to have a psychic look at the house. The psychic says there is no history of paranormal activity in the house, then privately suggests to Tony that Sue should see a doctor. Tony drives the psychic home, leaving Sue alone in the house. She then has visions of a family being killed by the man with the knife, causing her to have a breakdown.

Tony sells the house to a family, who are the people Sue has been having visions of. The visions she was having were not of past events, but premonitions of the future. While Tony attempts to leave in his car, he has his throat slit with a straight razor by the killer, hiding in the backseat. The killer then enters the house to kill the family, with a newspaper in the back of Tony’s car reporting on the maniac’s recent escape from an asylum.

In the apartment, Bruce goes to have sex with Marie, while Ed starts watching the last tape.

=== Garden of Blood ===
Gavin, an ill-tempered motocross racer, is hired by two elderly women, Emma and Mildred Hurley, to be a gardener and handyman for their estate. The women say the garden is looked after by fairies, and their ancestor, Lady Ann Hurley, who’s painting is on the wall, made a pact with them to prevent her husband, who’s painting is next to hers, from finding out about her string of lovers.

Gavin and his brother Tim, along with Tim’s boss, Frank, sneak back to the house at night to rob it. While searching the house for valuables, Gavin and Frank find a large chest full of money and gold, which they carry out of the house. While Tim is stealing the silverware, the room suddenly becomes full of garden gnomes, one of which comes to life and strangles him.

Gavin becomes concerned when Tim does not return, and goes back into the house to look for him. Staying outside, Frank is distracted by a fairie light, and set upon by the reanimated corpses of Lady Ann Hurley’s lovers, who the old ladies said were buried in the garden. Gavin sees that the paintings on the wall are empty, then is pinned to the wall and stabbed with knives by Lady Ann Hurley, who comes out of the painting.

The two elderly women show another male housekeeper around, with the painting of Lady Ann’s husband being replaced by Gavin.

=== Epilogue ===
A hand emerges from the television set and strangles Ed, while Bruce gets beaten to death by the Punch killer.

== Cast ==
- Robin Bailey as Jack Grimshaw
- Ann Lynn as Lena
- Ian Saynor as Tony
- Yvonne Nicholson as Susan
- David Van Day as Gavin
- Dora Bryan as Emma
- Jean Anderson as Mildred
- Vincent Russo as Ed
- Marie Scinto as Marie
- Dione Inman as Suzy
- Bosco Hogan as doctor
- Lally Bowers as Mrs. Kingsley
- Veronica Doran as Miss Burns
- Jonathon Morris as Damien
- Matthew Peters as Tim
- Phillip Bloomfield as Colin
- Gary Linley as Frank
- Michael Gordon as Bill
- Brenda Kempner as woman
- Kevin Smith as shop owner
- John Styles as Punch voice
- Kim Thomson as Lady Anne

== Release ==
=== Reception ===
AllMovie stated: "The real gem here, though, is "Scream House" [Dreamhouse], a truly unsettling tale that unfolds at a perfectly creepy pace and boasts a simple but surprising twist ending." But felt that "the American sequences that glue the three stories together could have been tossed off in an afternoon, but they do offer some entirely unnecessary nudity and boneheaded Brooklynese that should amuse slumming horror fans who give Screamtime a chance. Conversely, TV Guide singled out the film's final story, "Garden of Blood", as the film's best, but concluded there is "not a shock or scare to be found anywhere."

Bloody Disgusting wrote: "There is no denying this anthology feels like a quick money grab. Yet, even as low-cost as the film comes across, the content itself is for the most part entertaining and not as uneven as other slapdash compilations that cropped up later. What Screamtime lacks in budget it makes up for in charm." They also praised the film's approach to the wrap-around segment: "As is custom with nearly all anthologies containing a wraparound, the main characters are never safe regardless of their distance from the featured stories. However, Armstrong and Long's film takes an innovative approach to how Ed, Bruce, and Marie come upon these cursed videos and meet their doomed fates. It all feels like a precursor to more recent anthologies, such as V/H/S."

Screen Rant called it a "charming British offering", and included it in their list of "10 Underrated 1980s Horror Movies", stating: "As with many horror anthologies, the quality ebbs and flows, but Screamtime is overall a good time."

=== Home video ===
The film was originally released on VHS in 1985 by Lightning Video in the United States. As of 2024, it has yet to be officially released on DVD or Blu-ray, but can be streamed on Amazon Prime Video.
