= The Man Without a Body =

1957 British film by Charles Saunders and W. Lee Wilder

- Directed by: Charles Saunders; W. Lee Wilder
- Written by: William Grote
- Produced by: Guido Coen
- Starring: Robert Hutton; George Coulouris; Julia Arnall
- Cinematography: Brendan J. Stafford
- Edited by: Tom Simpson
- Music by: Albert Elms
- Production company: Filmplays Ltd.
- Distributed by: Eros Films; Budd Rogers Releasing Corporation (US)
- Release date: May 1957 (UK)
- Running time: 80 minutes
- Country: United Kingdom
- Language: English
- Budget: £20,000

The Man Without a Body (also known as Curse of Nostradamus) is a low budget 1957 British second feature horror film, produced by Guido Coen and directed by Charles Saunders and W. Lee Wilder. It stars Robert Hutton, George Coulouris, Julia Arnall and Nadja Regin. A wealthy American man with a brain tumour plans to replace his brain with that of Nostradamus.

The film was released theatrically in England in 1957 on a double bill with the Japanese film Half Human (1958) and a year later in the US on a double bill with Fright (1956).

== Plot ==
Wealthy, vain New York City businessman Karl Brussard is behaving oddly – answering telephones that aren't ringing, forgetting that he owns ships in Miami, failing to recognise his own physician, Dr Charot. Charot shows Brussard an x-ray of his head. Brussard looks at it admiringly and says, "Ah, beautiful – the brain of Karl Brussard!" But Charot tells him that he has an inoperable brain tumour and advises him to go to England, where Dr Phil Merrit is researching brain transplantation. Brussard and his much younger companion, Odette Vernet, leave at once.

Brussard meets Merritt, his nurse Jean Cramer and Dr Lew Waldenhouse in London. Merritt confirms Charot's diagnosis, but Brussard is more interested in the living monkey's head that he's seen in Merritt's laboratory. Merritt explains that its brain came from a monkey which had been dead for six years and that he and his staff 'revitalised' the brain and implanted it into the head. Merritt says that the brain will "change its personality" to the one the monkey formerly had. Brussard decides that he needs a new brain and, during a visit to Madame Tussaud's wax museum, learns of Nostradamus.

Brussard hires the drunken Dr Brandon and they go to France, open Nostradamus' crypt and steal his head. Brussard takes it to Merritt's lab. Without knowing whose head it is, Merritt's staff revitalise it. Brussard, who hasn't been told of this development, goes to the lab alone and finds the head, exclaiming, "It's alive! My brain! It's alive!" When Merritt tries to force him out of the lab, Brussard, in a rage, accuses Merritt of trying to kill him and damages the Omnigizer, a vital piece of medical equipment.

After Jean repairs the Omnigizer, the head speaks, identifying itself as Michel de Notre Dame. 'It's Nostradamus!' exclaims Meritt. He, Jean and Lew tell Nostradamus that his predictions have come true. "A great mind that can see into the future!" declares Brussard. "Worthy to be Karl Brussard!" When told that he's alive again, Nostradamus says, "It's against nature" and asks "Why have you done this?" Brussard answers by yelling at Nostradamus, telling him that he (Nostradamus) is now him (Brussard).

Later, a mentally confused Brussard asks Nostradamus what he should do with his oil stocks. Nostradamus, knowing that stock prices are dropping, deliberately tells him to sell. Brussard does and is financially ruined.

Odette, meanwhile, has been secretly dating Lew. Brussard discovers the affair, follows her to Lew's flat and strangles her. Lew arrives and finds Odette's body. Brussard, who has been hiding in another room, steps out, revolver in hand. Lew runs for his life, Brussard in pursuit. Lew goes to the lab and Brussard shoots him in the back then flees. Merritt examines Lew and says that 'his cranial nerves have been severed'. He tells a police detective that Lew can't be saved. Brussard returns and shoots Nostradamus' head. Merritt decides to attach Nostradamus' head to Lew's body in an attempt to save them both.

Brussard returns again and discovers that Lew has become a monster, with Nostradamus' head encased in what appears to be a shoulder-width box covered with surgical tape. Brussard runs away; Nostradamus wanders off. Merritt calls Dr Alexander and tells him that Nostradamus "seems demented" and has 'lost the power of speech'. But then the police spot Nostradamus. Merritt and Jean run to a building with a bell tower and find Brussard chasing Nostradamus up a staircase. Brussard becomes dizzy and falls to his death. The bells begin to ring and Lew's body comes crashing down, leaving Nostradamus' head dangling in the bell ropes.

== Cast ==
- Robert Hutton as Dr. Phil R. Merritt
- George Coulouris as Karl Brussard
- Julia Arnall as Jean Cramer
- Nadja Regin as Odette Vernet
- Sheldon Lawrence as Dr. Lew Waldenhouse
- Peter Copley as Leslie
- Michael Golden as Michel de Notre Dame (Nostradamus)
- Norman Shelley as Dr. Alexander
- Stanley Van Beers as Madame Tussaud's Guide
- Tony Quinn as Dr. Brandon
- Maurice Kaufmann as chauffeur
- William Sherwood as Dr. Charot
- Edwin Ellis as publican
- Donald Morley as stockbroker
- Frank Forsyth as detective
- Kim Parker as Suzanne, the maid
- Ernest Bale as customs officer

== Production ==
The film was partly financed from the National Film Finance Corporation (NFFC). The directing credit was shared between Wilder and Saunders to ensure funding from the Eady levy, which was paid by distributors to film-makers in order to assure that British actors and production people would be employed, although in reality Wilder did most of the directing. Star Robert Hutton said in an interview that he remembers Saunders 'being on the set all the time and not doing anything. To satisfy the union, they had to hire an English director because of the rules'. Shooting took place over three weeks. The film's budget of £20,000 was 'meagre' but enough for Twickenham Studios to be booked and Filmways Ltd to be established as the production company.

The Man Without a Body was filmed in 1956. Outside-the-studio locations around London included the interior of Madame Tussaud's wax museum. It is the only film credited to Filmways Ltd.

== Release ==
The film was paired in the UK with the Japanese film Half-Human (1958). In the US it shared a double bill with Fright (1956). The pressbook for The Man Without a Body and Fright called the pairing 'The Twin-Terror Show That Tops Them All!' British movie posters promised audiences "Science's Most Terrifying Experiment!", while American audiences were teased by posters that claimed "a diabolical dream come true!"

The Man Without a Body was given an X-certificate by the British Board of Film Censors (BBFC) when it was released in the UK, which meant it was suitable for exhibition only to people age 16 or over. The rating was a deliberate manoeuvre on the part of its distributor, Eros Films, which sought out horror films, imported movies and other films aimed at young adults that could get an 'X-cert' in order to exploit the market for such films.

The exact date of the American release is unclear. The Internet Movie Data Base (IMDb) only states 1958 and the Turner Classic Movies Data Base (TCMDb) gives a date of January 1958. Film Critic Bill Warren writes that the film was released in 1959. None specify an exact day.

The Man Without a Body opened in the UK in May 1957 – again without a specific day being noted – and in West Germany, specifically, on 1 May 1959. It was later shown as part of the Night Visions Film Festival in Helsinki, Finland on 31 March 2007.

Budd Rogers Releasing Corporation was responsible for theatrical distribution in the US. The Man Without a Body has had only a limited release for individual home viewing. The only reference to home distribution that could be found was for a release on VHS by Cinefear in the US, without a year designated.

The film has had only limited American television exposure. All or parts of it were shown in 1978, 1979 and 1980 on TJ and the All Night Theatre, telecast on Friday nights by a local TV station in Green Bay, Wisconsin. The station broadcast 247 episodes of the programme during the 1970s and 1980s.

A poster of the movie is displayed in Inside the Tower, a documentary released in the UK on 2 November 2015. A DVD of the documentary was distributed world-wide by Odeon Entertainment the same year.

== Critical reception ==
The Monthly Film Bulletin wrote: "This remarkable shocker piles its horrors up with such extravagant bathos that it finally achieves an almost surrealist quality of absurdity. Script, direction and playing are banal and amateurish; while a new foreign actress, Nadja Regin gives a performance of joyous inadequacy, quite in keeping with the general atmosphere."

American critical reception of The Man Without a Body is somewhat difficult to judge because of a paucity of reviews. While Warren notes that "reviews are scarce", he is nevertheless able to refer to a handful of contemporary reviews. He comments that Don Willis, in his book Horror and Science Fiction Films, wrote that its 'fancy directorial touches' were 'wasted on a story which reaches awesome heights of ludicrousness' and that in A Heritage of Horror, British author David Pirie called the film a 'particularly ludicrous piece'.

British critic John Hamilton calls the movie a "confusing and confused tale", citing its 'lack of logical plotting and paper-thin characterisation' and its 'unintentionally hilarious script'. He writes that the film 'managed to slip below the radar of most film reviewers' in the UK, then "sank without a trace".

Another British critic, Phil Hardy, writes that 'the direction by Saunders and Wilder (the brother of Billy) is decidedly pedestrian but the delirium of the central idea survives even its awkward articulation. The film, though not a great financial success, sparked off a number of similar re-animated head films, including [the West German] The Head (1959) and the [American] fantasy, The Thing That Couldn't Die (1958)'.

The re-animated head of Nostradamus is cause for scorn, both from actors and critics. Hutton said in an interview that he and the other actors "felt stupid talking to the head– we would almost break up! The actor was underneath the table, with his head stuck up through a hole in the table top, and you felt like a damn fool talking to him". Warren writes that "as Nostradamus, Michael Golden has little to do except poke his head through a hole in the table and talk" and even then "many of the shots of the prophet's head are of a dummy cranium, obviously not Golden". The topics the actors discuss with the head are regarded as dubious, as well, with Hardy saying that "the highpoint of the film ... is an extended debate between Coulouris and Nostradamus' head in which the pair harangue each other, Nostradamus finding the purpose for which he's been re-animated too petty".

Elsewise, Warren calls the cinematography "murky ... uninteresting and highly variable". He says that the sets are 'drab' and that the film 'drags itself from scene to scene'. He calls the acting "either non-existent or terrible or, in the case of Coulouris, so far over the top as to make it hard to imagine the actor ... took the proceedings seriously". In summary, Warren writes that The Man Without a Body "isn't just bad, it's colourfully, almost surrealistically bad, worthy of inclusion on almost any list of impressively awful movies".

British academic film scholars Stephan Chibnall and Brian McFarlane call the film "entertainingly absurd".
