= Michael J. Jackson =

English actor

- Born: Liverpool, Merseyside, England
- Education: University of London
- Occupation: Actor
- Years active: 1973–present

Michael J. Jackson is an English actor.

== Early career ==
Jackson studied at the University of London and then joined repertory theatre in Sheffield, followed by Coventry, Birmingham and Edinburgh. He appeared in several theatre productions early on in his career, including a West End production with Rowan Atkinson and Watford's Palace Theatre's production of The Incident at Tulse Hill. He won the Evening Standard British Film Award for Most Promising Newcomer Actor in 1978.

He has worked in theatres across the country throughout his career, including a stint as Duke Frederick in Shakespeare's As You Like It and most recently when he starred as George Pye in Humble Boy at the Northcott Theatre, Exeter.

== Television appearances ==
Jackson appeared in several television series at the beginning of his career starting with one episode of Man About The House in 1973, followed by Anna Karenina, Till Death..., The Legend of Robin Hood, Play For Today, Doctor Who, One Summer and Fairly Secret Army. In 1988, Jackson appeared in the television series Wish Me Luck, with a leading role in all three series between 1988 and 1990. Following the success of this show Jackson appeared in one-off episodes of Maigret, Bugs and Ellington before undertaking a role in the Liverpudlian soap Brookside in 1996–98.

Jackson also made several appearances in the television series Highlander: The Series in 1996–97. His next television role was in the drama Now You See Her, also starring Amanda Holden. He went on to appear in The White Knight Stratagem, Dalziel and Pascoe and Judge John Deed.

In 2002, Jackson appeared in the television drama Birthday Girl starring Sarah Lancashire. His next television role was as a doctor in the BBC soap/drama Doctors from 2003 to 2004. He has since appeared in Murphy's Law, Casualty, Faith, Dream Team and the ITV drama Mobile which was screened in May 2007.

During October/November 2007, Jackson took part in a reality television show Make Me a Film Star. He was on the judging panel auditioning actors for a role in a film which he was to co-direct.

In October 2010, he joined the cast of Emmerdale, playing the character Jerry Walsh. He had previously appeared in Emmerdale in 1995 as a professor.

In September 2012, Jackson appeared in Coronation Street as the character Sid Altree.

== Filmography ==
Year	Title	Role	Notes
1978	Sweeney 2	Soames	
1975	The Legend of Robin Hood	Richard I	Miniseries
1977	Anna Karenina	Landau	Miniseries
1979	That Summer!	Hotel Clerk	
1983	Doctor Who	Sir Geoffrey	Episode: The King's Demons
1985	Morons from Outer Space	Second Scientist	
1987	The Fourth Protocol	Major Pavlov	
1993	Maigret	Prosper Donge	Episode: Maigret and the Hotel Majestic
1994-2011	Emmerdale	Professor Andrew MacKinnon/Jerry Walsh	
1996-1997	Highlander: The Series	Sean Burns	3 episodes
1999-2004	Casualty	Mike Branscombe/Peter Cavanagh	3 episodes
2000	There's Only One Jimmy Grimble	Colin	
2001	Murder Rooms: Mysteries of the Real Sherlock Holmes	Orde	Episode: The White Knight Stratagem
2001	The Bill	Dave Markham	Episode: Money Man
2001	Dalziel and Pascoe	Tom Bennet	Episode: Truth and Consequences
2003-2004	Doctors	Eric Fuller/Dr. Mike Miles	
2012-2014	Coronation Street	Sid Altree	5 episodes
2015	Pleasure Island	Miles	
