= World Without Shame =

1962 British film by Donovan Winter

- Theatrical release poster
- Directed by: Donovan Winter
- Written by: Donovan Winter
- Produced by: Donovan Winter; Russell Gay
- Starring: Yvonne Martell
- Production company: Mistral Productions
- Distributed by: Gala
- Release date: May 1962
- Running time: 71 mins
- Country: United Kingdom
- Language: English

World Without Shame is a 1962 British naturist film directed and written by Donovan Winter and starring Yvonne Martell. It was produced by Winter and Russell Gay.

== Plot ==
After winning on the football pools, a group of young people leave London to begin a new, carefree, naturist life on a deserted Mediterranean island.

== Cast ==
- Yvonne Martell
- Larry Bowen
- Diane Valeri
- Jean Robert
- Laurel Grey
- Paul Christian
- Laura Beaumont
- Michael Troy

== Critical reception ==
Monthly Film Bulletin said "From the naturist standpoint, this nudist film is much like any other, if a trifle less eventful and duller than usual. The most intriguing feature to the unconverted onlooker is the reasons advanced for the party's enterprise: escape from commercialism and the establishment, freedom from conventions, escape from nuclear hazards. The health-promotion aspect, usually the main propaganda element, is here relatively underplayed."

Kine Weekly wrote: "The script, acting, dialogue and commentary are pretty flabby, and the same goes for most of the naked 'charmers,' but incidental popular romantic and humorous touches, plus exotic backgrounds, get it by. ... The picture is the latest, but by no means the snappiest, contribution to the current nudist saga. Its story, 'communal Robinson Crusoe,' has little shape and the players seldom rise above its shortcomings, yet it contains an agreeable love interest, a few spontaneous comedy asides, fascinating underwater swimming, and some artistic posing by the one girl with a shapely figure. These attributes, heightened by authentic tropical scenery, not only take up part of the slack, but also compensate for flatulent dialogue, pontificating on the chaotic conditions in our atomic bomb threatened world."
