= Give Us Tomorrow =

1978 British crime film by Donovan Winter

- Directed by: Donovan Winter
- Written by: Donovan Winter
- Produced by: Donovan Winter
- Starring: Sylvia Syms; Derren Nesbitt; James Kerry
- Cinematography: Austin Parkinson
- Edited by: Donovan Winter
- Release date: 1978
- Running time: 94 minutes
- Country: United Kingdom
- Language: English

Give Us Tomorrow is a 1978 British crime film directed, written and produced by Donovan Winter and starring Sylvia Syms, Derren Nesbitt and James Kerry.

== Plot ==
After a bank manager leaves for work one morning, a criminal and his accomplice take his wife and children hostage. At the bank, he is forced to open the safe.

== Cast ==
- Sylvia Syms as Wendy
- Derren Nesbitt as Ron
- James Kerry as Martin
- Derek Anders as Police Inspector
- Mark Elwes as assistant manager
- Donna Evans as Nicola Hammond
- Gene Foad as bank clerk
- Alan Guy as the boy
- Richard Shaw as 1st bank robber
- Derek Ware as 2nd bank robber
- Victor Brooks as Superintendent Ogilvie
- Matthew Haslett as Jamie Hammond
- Ken Barker as Police Sergeant Wilson
- Chris Holroyd as P.C. McLaren
- Carol Shaw as girl driver
- Lolly Cockrell as reporter
- William Parker as reporter
- Gil Sutherland as reporter

== Production ==
According to the film's credits. the film was shot in Orpington, Kent. However, the real house used was in the Kingsway area of Petts Wood. Birchwood Road is also seen. The former, real, high street bank which was used, on the corner of Moorfield Road, still stands. The footage also briefly passes the railway station. Glimpses of the Sevenoak's Road turn-off to Petts Wood are also seen.

== Reception ==
The Monthly Film Bulletin wrote: "Despite occasional lapses in emphasis, the initial exposition of Give Us Tomorrow is reasonably gripping. The placidly well-to-do surroundings of Orpington effectively offset the criminal exploits, and the clown masks worn by the bank raiders provide an appropriate (if not altogether original) touch of distorting horror. Once the action is restricted to the bank manager's home, however, the movie bogs down in reams of static dialogue, with Derren Nesbitt alternately loosing four-letter invective at middle-class respectability and hymning the homely virtues of a pot of char, and Sylvia Syms either castigating him as the scum of the earth or primly correcting his pronunciation of Cinzano. A situation familiar from Andrew Stone's The Night Holds Terror, and from sundry less memorable airings in the cinema and on TV – not for nothing, one feels, does the young hoodlum justify himself with "you see it all the time on the telly" – never creates a persuasive tension here. There is not even much impact in the climactic action, in which the lead heavy lets himself be gunned down so easily that one might think he recognised the ultimate right to win of the (surprisingly small) police contingent."

In The Radio Times Guide to Films David Parkinson gave the film 1/5 stars, writing: "In trying to re-create the tension of a hostage situation following a bungled bank job, writer/director Donovan Winter shies away from portraying intimidation and human drama and instead plunges us into a risible debate on the iniquities of the class system. Derren Nesbitt's villain is far less scary than Sylvia Syms's affronted suburbanite. Hopeless."

Graeme Clark of review website The Spinning Image finds the premise similar to that of The Desperate Hours (1955).

== Home media ==
The film was released on DVD in 2007 by Nucleus Films.
