= Mark of the Phoenix =

1958 British film by Maclean Rogers

- Opening titles
- Directed by: Maclean Rogers
- Written by: Norman Hudis
- Based on: novel The Phoenix Sings by Desmond Cory
- Produced by: W.G. Chalmers
- Starring: Julia Arnall; Sheldon Lawrence; Anton Diffring
- Cinematography: Geoffrey Faithfull
- Edited by: Harry Booth
- Music by: Wilfred Burns (uncredited)
- Production company: Butcher's Film Service
- Distributed by: Butcher's Film Service (UK)
- Release date: November 1958 (UK)
- Running time: 78 minutes
- Country: United Kingdom
- Language: English

Mark of the Phoenix is a 1958 British second feature ('B') drama film directed by Maclean Rogers and starring Julia Arnall, Sheldon Lawrence and Anton Diffring. It was written by Norman Hudis. An American jewel thief comes into possession of a newly developed metal.

== Plot ==
A newly developed and valuable metal is stolen and formed into a cigarette case for transportation to East Germany, but an American jewel thief comes into possession of it and finds himself a target.

== Cast ==
- Julia Arnall as Petra
- Sheldon Lawrence as Chuck Martin
- Anton Diffring as Inspector Schell
- Eric Pohlmann as Duser
- George Margo as Emilson
- Michael Peake as Koos
- Martin Miller as Brunet
- Roger Delgado as Devron
- Bernard Rebel as Vachek
- Frederick Schrecker as Van de Velde
- Pierre Chaminade as hotel receptionist
- Corinne Grey as bride
- Jennifer Jayne as airline ticket clerk
- Edouard Assaly as café waiter
- Victor Beaumont as travel clerk
- Norma Parnell as 2nd airline ticket clerk
- Howard Greene as young detective
- Tom Clegg as strong man
- Patrick Troughton as police officer (uncredited)

== Critical reception ==
The Monthly Film Bulletin wrote: "This spy story has all the usual trimmings as tough, handsome American jewel thief, portly art-collector gang leader, shot scientist, secret formula and brutal foreign agents as but almost makes up for their familiarity by lively pacing. This turns out to be the film's sole virtue, however, since direction, dialogue and performances are on a distressingly amateurish level."

Picture Show wrote: "There's plenty of action in this exciting spy drama ... Sheldon Lawrence ably plays the confident thief and Julian Arnall supplies the slight romantic interest."

Picturegoer wrote: "The idea's all right; but the plot's too complicated. Long before the end it's impossible to sort out who is who."

In British Sound Films David Quinlan wrote: ''Feverishly complicated thriller, not too well acted.''

The Radio Times Guide to Films gave the film 1/5 stars, writing: "This dismal low-budget thriller has a corkscrew plot involving rare metals, jewel thieves, international blackmail, the Cold War and much else. ... The mediocre cast is typical of British B-movies of the period, with the sole exception of Anton Diffring."
