= Keith Faulkner =

British actor (born 1936)

Keith Faulkner (born 25 July 1936) is a British-born Australian actor.

== Early life ==
Faulkner was born in Richmond, Surrey. He started his career at Corona Academy at the age of eleven and moved on to a career in film and television in the late 1950s and early 1960s.

== Career ==
Faulkner later left acting and moved to Australia, where he worked for a telecommunications company. In the late-1940s, he appeared at the London Coliseum in Annie Get Your Gun playing Annie Oakley's brother Little Jake. In 1951, he appeared at Stratford-upon-Avon's Memorial Theatre during the Festival of Britain Season, playing Falstaff's Page in Henry IV and the Boy in Henry V. This was followed by an extensive tour of Britain with the Elizabethan Theatre Company, performing various Shakespearean productions. In the 1950s, Keith Faulkner was known for his roles as Ginger in Just William and Bob Cherry in Billy Bunter of Greyfriars School (both BBC TV series) and also featured in juvenile roles in a number of feature films. In the early 1960s, he appeared in several B-film thrillers and crime films and starred in The Man in the Back Seat, and Strongroom. His last screen credit was in 1963.

== Personal life ==
Faulkner and his wife, Pat, have two sons.

== Partial filmography ==
- The Happiest Days of Your Life (1950)
- Laxdale Hall (1953)
- Johnny on the Run (1953)
- The Blue Peter (1955)
- Yangtse Incident (1957)
- Tunes of Glory (1960)
- Linda (1960)
- Edgar Wallace Mysteries Episode The Sinister Man (1961)
- Payroll (1961)
- The Man in the Back Seat (1961)
- The Pot Carriers (1962)
- Strongroom (1962)
- It's All Happening (1963)
