= The Fake (1953 film) =

1953 British film by Godfrey Grayson

- Directed by: Godfrey Grayson
- Written by: Bridget Boland; Patrick Kirwan
- Based on: an original story by James Daplyn
- Produced by: Steven Pallos
- Starring: Dennis O'Keefe; Coleen Gray; Hugh Williams; Guy Middleton
- Cinematography: Cedric Williams
- Edited by: Charles Hasse
- Music by: Matyas Seiber
- Production company: Pax Films
- Distributed by: United Artists
- Release dates: 5 June 1953 (UK); 25 November 1953 (US)
- Running time: 80 minutes
- Country: United Kingdom
- Language: English

The Fake is a 1953 British crime mystery directed by Godfrey Grayson and starring Dennis O'Keefe and Coleen Gray. An American detective tries to prevent the theft of a priceless painting from the Tate Gallery in London.

== Plot ==
A cargo ship unloads a clutch of nondescript wooden cases onto the nighttime London docks. A fracas is instigated, and in the ensuing chaos a shady figure makes off with one of its crates.

A man watching it all from a distance, Paul A. Mitchell, takes off after him, but is tackled by a seeming conspirator. They struggle. When Mitchell, an American freeboot "security man", gets the upper hand he learns his assailant is "Smith", an investigator for the insurance company that had written a $1 million dollar policy on a "priceless" artwork, Leonardo da Vinci's Madonna and Child, that had been part of the ship's cargo, on loan from the U.S. to appear in an upcoming exhibition at London's famed Tate Gallery. As the thief and his helpers have separately disappeared, the pair head straight to the Tate and awaiting museum authorities there.

Mitchell explains that he has been hired by the painting's owner to ensure its safe delivery, and is courteously introduced to Sir Richard Aldingham by Tate director Peter Randall, described as one of Britain's great art collectors and museum benefactor who had been instrumental in arranging the exhibition. Randall's politeness ends there, excoriating Mitchell for allowing the Leonardo to be stolen. Mitchell, ever cheeky and self-advancing, cheerfully unwraps the parcel he'd had tucked under his arm and declares it the original artwork, which he'd hidden in the ship's safe anticipating a theft attempt. He then asserts that there had to have been a mole at the Tate, as the cargo manifest did not identify the painting yet the thieves knew exactly which crate to steal.

Rhapsodizing over a potential $50,000 reward that has been posted, he then announces his intention to stay on and attempt to discover how the foiled effort was linked to recent successful heists of Leonardos in Florence and New York – in each instance the original having been replaced by a forgery so nearly perfect it had delayed discovery of the switch for weeks.

Mitchell's first suspect becomes minor but highly attractive Tate employee Mary Mason, who sneaks a shady looking man into the exhibition opening through the gallery's basement. This falls flat with everyone when it's revealed it was just her father, Henry Mason, a talented but opinionated minor painter known to museum authorities. In spite of her prickly rebuffs, Mitchell persists in pursuing Mary, making few obvious gains in his work but beginning to win Mason over, whom he suspects is the closet genius who painted the Leonardo forgeries.

Thanks to the Tate's extremely inadequate security measures the Madonna and Child is soon stolen, with the thief eluding a less than aggressive pursuit by Mitchell. Following an evening of courting Mary, Mitchell is roughed up by two thugs, but saved from worse by a providentially trailing Smith. His new ally invites him to inspect Henry's quayside lair, where the loner paints in anonymity...or secrecy. Which it is they hope to determine, but instead discover him strung from a noose in an apparent suicide.

Mitchell knows enough to persuade Smith it was actually murder, and in a second visit there accidentally stumbles onto a clue that may help him home in on the kingpin behind it all.

Meanwhile, the adventurer carrying out the Leonardo thefts, Weston, appears at the home of Sir Richard, catching the connoisseur entranced in his three stolen masterpieces. Infuriated that his catspaw disobeyed orders and both phoned him there then showed in person, Sir Richard then demands that Weston murder Mary to prevent her from raising suspicions. When Weston refuses and threatens betrayal in return, Sir Richard deftly pours poison into his drink and sends him on his way...to a gasping death in a callbox shortly after.

He then convinces Mary to come to his home with a promise of taking her to grieve in companionable comfort at his sister's. Before he can kill her, Mitchell appears from the shadows and threatens to destroy the Madonna and Child with a vial of acid. Holding the lunatic at gunpoint, Sir Richard berates him for proposing to destroy an irreplaceable masterwork. Tossing on the acid distracts Sir Richard, who drops his gun and rushes to the painting. Mitchell calmly takes the pistol retrieved by Mary, explains to Sir Richard he'd been outfoxed, that Mason had actually stolen a forgery, and holds him for arrest.

With the original safely on display at the Tate the next day, a beaming Mary is tumbling toward matrimony with the soon to be flush maverick, less her father but with all the other loose ends tidied.

== Cast ==
- Dennis O'Keefe as Paul Aloysius Mitchell
- Coleen Gray as Mary Mason
- Hugh Williams as Sir Richard Aldingham
- Guy Middleton as Smith
- John Laurie as Henry Mason
- Eliot Makeham as pavement artist (George)
- Gerald Case as Peter Randall
- Seymour Green as Weston
- Stanley Van Beers as Cartwright
- Dora Bryan as barmaid
- Ellen Pollock as Miss Fossett
- Philip Ray as bearded tramp
- Morris Sweden as Pettigrew
- Michael Ward as art salesman
- Arnold Bell as police inspector
- Clifford Buckton as lodging house keeper
- Marianne Noelle as girl student
- Leslie Phillips as boy student
- Billie Whitelaw as waitress
- Tom Clegg as 1st thug
- Guy Deghy as stranger
- John Wadham as thug
- Frank Atkinson as Tate Gallery attendant
- Johnnie Schofield as Tate Gallery attendant
- Leonard Sharp as Tate Gallery attendant

== Critical reception ==
The Monthly Film Bulletin wrote: "In essence a routine little thriller, the film nevertheless keeps up a pretty pace and glosses over its more improbable moments with an easy competence. The setting – the Tate – is novel, even if the theme isn't. Although the ending is plainly evident from the first meeting with an oh-so-terribly obliging Sir Richard Aldingham – too silkily played by Hugh Williams – the script avoids the more obvious thriller tricks and achieves a decent suspense throughout. Most of the characterisation – particularly that of Dennis O'Keefe as the brash Mitchell and Coleen Gray as Mary – is stereotyped but adequate. John Laurie, wildly out of key, gives a fruitily erratic performance as the doomed Mason. Enjoyable, assembly line adventure."

The Hollywood Reporter found The Fake "fairly diverting".

Critic Leonard Maltin called the film an "OK crime drama," and rated it two out of four stars.
