= Intimate Games =

1976 British film by Tudor Gates

- Directed by: Tudor Gates
- Written by: Tudor Gates
- Produced by: Guido Coen
- Starring: George Baker; Anna Bergman; Ian Hendry
- Cinematography: Frank Watts
- Edited by: Pat Foster
- Music by: Roger Webb
- Production company: Podenhale Productions
- Distributed by: Tigon Film Distributors
- Release date: June 1976
- Running time: 90 minutes
- Country: United Kingdom
- Language: English
- Budget: £60,000

Intimate Games (also known as Sex Games of the Very Rich) is a 1976 British sex comedy directed by Tudor Gates and starring George Baker, Anna Bergman and Ian Hendry. It was written by Gates.

== Plot ==
Professor Gottlieb pairs his psychology students and instructs them to write down each other's sexual fantasies. The students then decide to put their desires into practice, and later send Gottlieb their accounts. Back in class, Gottlieb imagines the girls naked and is driven away in an ambulance foaming at the mouth.

== Cast ==
- George Baker as Professor Gottlieb
- Monika Ringwald as secretary
- John Benson as executive
- Dudley Stevens as prisoner
- Jonathan David as interrogator
- Peter Blake as John
- Chet Townsend as Nick
- Anna Bergman as Suzy
- Maria St. Clare as Jane
- Edward Kalinski as Benny
- Heather Deeley as Marian
- Suzy Mandel as Erica
- Felicity Devonshire as Cathy
- Norman Chappell as principal
- Lindy Benson as wife
- Forbes Collins as husband
- Queenie Watts as mother
- Hugh Lloyd as father
- Barbara Eatwell as dream girl
- Martin Neil as Joe
- Joyce Blair as Beryl
- Johnny Vyvyan as little man
- Claire Davenport as fat lady
- Ian Hendry as Uncle Rodney
- Normaline as maid
- Susan Glanville as housewife
- Guy Standeven as psychiatrist
- Steve Amber as lover
- Peppi Borza as dancer
- John Melainey as dancer
- Roger Finch as dancer
- Mary Millington as choir girl

== Production ==
The film was shot at Twickenham Studios and on location in Oxford.

== Critical reception ==
The Monthly Film Bulletin wrote: "A cast of fresh-faced girls and clean-limbed young men cavort through this grindingly unfunny British sex comedy in apparent ignorance of the debilitating constraints of its coy, assembly-line plot. The discomfort of troupers like George Baker and Ian Hendry at participating in this tedious nonsense is, however, as apparent as the absence of passion from the decorous, dimly-lit lesbian love-making. A half-hearted attempt at placing the movie in a scientific context (by a last-minute voice-over warning against abnormal fantasies) is as strikingly unconvincing as all the permutations of sexual mimicry which have gone before."

Screen International wrote: "It is a thought to ponder on that all the heterosexual confrontations and couplings are given the nudge-nudge guffaw treatment while the tenderness and tasteful photography that make for true eroticism are reserved for the lesbian scene. The film is an uncomfortable bringing together of schoolboy rudery, girlie film nudity, time-wasting location filming, and a down-beat tragic ending. The one delight is Joyce Blair's dance. The young actors have vitality and charm. The guest stars have my sympathy."
