= Helen Christie =

British actress (1914–1995)

- Born: Helen Mary Christie; 22 October 1914; British India
- Died: 17 March 1995 (aged 80); Worthing, Sussex, England, United Kingdom
- Years active: 1949–1991
- Spouses: Patrick Crean (m. 1943, divorced) Mark Dignam (m. 1948, divorced) John Barron (m. 1991)

Helen Christie (22 October 1914 – 17 March 1995) was a British stage, film and television actress. She was married to Patrick Crean.

== Selected filmography ==
Film

- Up for the Cup (1950)
- Wide Boy (1952)
- Castle in the Air (1952)
- The Beggar's Opera (1953)
- Rasputin the Mad Monk (1966)
- Decline and Fall... of a Birdwatcher (1968)
- The Smashing Bird I Used to Know (1969)
- Lust for a Vampire (1971)
- Escort Girls (1975)

Television

- Melissa (1964)
- Middlemarch (1968)
- Wives and Daughters (1971)
- The Pallisers (1974)
