= Julia Arnall =

German-born British actress (1928–2018)

- Born: Julia Ilse Hendrike Irmgard von Stein Liebenstein zu Bachfeld; 21 November 1928; Munich, Germany
- Died: 8 November 2018 (aged 89); Brighton, Sussex, England, UK
- Other name: Julia Ilse Hendrika von Stein Liebenstein zu Bachfeld
- Occupation: Film actress
- Years active: 1953–1969
- Spouses: Desmond Arnall (m. 1950; div. 1955) Percy Robert Ottaway (m. 1960; div. 1975)
- Children: 3 (1 with Percy, 2 with Desmond)

Julia Arnall (21 November 1928 – 8 November 2018) was a German-born British-based actress.

== Personal life ==
Born Julia Ilse Hendrike Irmgard von Stein Liebenstein zu Bachfeld in 1928 in Munich, she spent her childhood in Berlin, where her father was an army officer. She attended drama school in Vienna. After the war ended she married Desmond Arnall, a British Army officer who had been posted to Berlin. In 1950, she came to Britain with her husband and her young son. In 1952, her second son was born.

In 1956 she and Arnall divorced. In 1960 she married a film, television, and jazz critic, with whom she had a daughter.

== Career ==
She started her life as a model before becoming an actress with the Rank Organisation. She appeared in bit parts in a few films before starring in the 1956 film Lost. After departing Rank, she continued acting, appearing in a few episodes of television shows, including The Saint and Emergency – Ward 10. In 1960 she appeared in the third episode of Danger Man entitled "Josetta" in which she was the main character opposite Patrick McGoohan.

In 1966 Arnall starred in The Saint (S5:E12 'Locate and Destroy') as Ingrid Coleman, the wife of a Mine Owner in South America who is also a Nazi war criminal.

== Selected filmography ==
- I Am a Camera (1955)
- Value for Money (1955)
- Simon and Laura (1955)
- Man of the Moment (1955)
- Lost (1956)
- House of Secrets (1956)
- The Man Without a Body (1957)
- Mark of the Phoenix (1958)
- Model for Murder (1959)
- Carry On Regardless (1961)
- The Trunk (1961)
- The Double Man (1967)

== Television ==
- Danger Man – Josetta (Series 1 Episode 3) (1960) as Josetta; (Series 1 Episode 38 – Dead Man Walks) as Natalie Smith
- Ghost Squad – Broken Doll (Series 1 Episode 4) (1961) as Julie Peters
- The Avengers – Intercrime (Series 2 Episode 15) (1963) as Hilda Stern
- The Saint – Locate and Destroy (Series 5 Episode 12) (1966) as Ingrid
