= Someone like You (musical) =

1989 British musical

Someone Like You is a musical with a book by Robin Midgley and Fay Weldon, lyrics by Dee Shipman, and music by Petula Clark.

Based on a concept developed by Clark and Ferdie Pacheco over a period of several years, it is set in West Virginia immediately after the end of the Civil War. Originally entitled Amen, it was conceived as a dark view of the difficulties Southerners faced dealing with carpetbaggers during the Reconstruction period, and also dealt with the problems of morphine-addicted Confederate soldiers returning home. It lost many of its serious overtones as the project evolved; Clark and Shipman's original book was revised substantially by Weldon (who also contributed the new title), and the plot became convoluted, often bordering on the ridiculous. Shipman later stated, "For all the faults there were in the original book . . . it was better than the hybrid we ended up with because it had passion."

The story centers on Abigail Kane, who journeys to America from her native England with her son Andy in search of her preacher husband, who allegedly had gone to the States to participate in the skirmish between North and South. She comes to the aid of the Major, a doctor struggling to care for a multitude of injured soldiers without the benefit of medical supplies, and soon discovers her missing husband is involved in shady dealings not usually associated with a man of the cloth. Drawn together out of both necessity and desire, Abigail and the Major forsake their marital vows and become involved in a passionate romance.

Directed by Midgley, the musical premiered on 25 October 1989 at the Cambridge Arts Theatre in Cambridge, and in his review in the Cambridge Evening News, Alan Kersey wrote, "Petula Clark proved last night at the world premiere of Someone Like You that she can still work wonders both on stage and in the tough real world of show business." The production toured the UK through 9 December.

On 22 March 1990, Someone Like You opened at the Strand Theatre in London's West End. In addition to Clark, it starred Dave Willetts (The Phantom of the Opera) as the Major, Clive Carter as Kane (roles in which Clark had hoped Andy Williams and Sting would be cast) and Lewis Rae as Andy. Reviews were mixed, although most critics praised Clark's performance and her contribution to the score.

Due to financial difficulties faced by producer Harold Fielding, all his assets were seized, and the show closed without warning after the 25 April performance. Although an original cast album was never released at the time, Clark's recordings of several of the tunes were issued on various CDs throughout the ensuing years.

A studio recording of the score was released by Sepia Records in May 2007. With arrangements by the show's original musical director and arranger, Kenny Clayton, it features vocals by Debi Doss, Andrew Derbyshire, and Lewis Rae, who appeared in the original production as young Andy. Clayton is featured on piano and keyboards, with David Martin on guitar and Eric Young on percussion.

== Song list ==
- Introduction
- Home Is Where the Heart Is
- Here We Are
- Empty Spaces
- Someone Like You
- All Through the Years
- So Easy
- What You Got!
- Getting the Right Thing Wrong
- I Am What You Need
- Young 'Un
- Losing You
- Amen
