= The Spy's Wife =

1972 British short crime film

- Directed by: Gerry O'Hara
- Screenplay by: Julian Holloway; Gerry O'Hara
- Produced by: Julian Holloway
- Starring: Dorothy Tutin; Tom Bell; Ann Lynn
- Cinematography: Dudley Lovell
- Edited by: Richard Mason
- Production company: Eyeline Films Ltd
- Release date: 1971
- Running time: 28 minutes
- Country: United Kingdom
- Language: English

The Spy's Wife is a 1971 British short crime film directed by Gerry O'Hara and starring Ann Lynn, Dorothy Tutin, Tom Bell, Vladek Sheybal and Julian Holloway. It was written by Holloway and O'Hara.

== Plot ==
Tom Tyler leaves London bound for a spying mission for Prague, and warns his wife Hilda that their apartment may be bugged. A man arrives at the apartment and helps Hilda search for bugs. Elsewhere, Tom is in bed with his contact Grace. As she turns the photograph of her husband – the man in Tom and Hilda's apartment – to the wall, a hidden microphone is revealed.

== Cast ==
- Dorothy Tutin as Hilda Tyler
- Ann Lynn as Grace
- Tom Bell as Tom Tyler
- Vladek Sheybal as Vladek
- Freda Bamford as Hilda's mother
- Glenna Forster-Jones as Shirley
- Janet Waldron as Elaine
- Julian Holloway as man
- Bunny May as driver
- Shaun Curry as chauffeur

== Reception ==
The Monthly Film Bulletin wrote: "A formal and rather disappointing exercise from Gerry O'Hara, The Spy's Wife gives the impression of a three-minute revue sketch, padding out a conventional charade of musical beds with some subdued gimmickry along James Bond lines. The enigma of whether the husband is or is not a spy quickly loses its appeal; and though the principle roles are expertly played, the only chilling moment of mystery occurs when Hilda's sinister-looking mother pulls some glasses which she claims to have bought at Casa Pupo out of a Habitat bag."
