= Peter Pan (1976 musical) =

- Written by: Andrew Birkin; Jack Burns
- Directed by: Dwight Hemion
- Starring: Mia Farrow; Danny Kaye
- Music by: Anthony Newley; Leslie Bricusse
- Countries of origin: United States; United Kingdom
- Original language: English

Production
- Executive producers: Dwight Hemion; Gary Smith
- Producer: Dwight Hemion
- Running time: 102 minutes
- Production companies: Hallmark Hall of Fame; Associated Television

Original release
- Network: ITV
- Release: February 29, 1976
- Network: NBC
- Release: December 12, 1976

Peter Pan is a 1976 British-American made-for-television musical film adaptation of J.M. Barrie's 1904 play and 1911 novel Peter Pan, or the Boy Who Wouldn't Grow Up starring Mia Farrow as Peter Pan and Danny Kaye as Captain Hook, and with Sir John Gielgud narrating. Julie Andrews sang one of the songs, "Once Upon a Bedtime", off-camera over the opening credits. It was first shown in the UK on Sunday, 29 February 1976 on ITV. It then aired as a presentation of Hallmark Hall of Fame on NBC at 7:30pm on Sunday, December 12, 1976, capping off the program's 25th year on the air.

The program did not use the score written for the highly successful Mary Martin version which had previously been televised many times on NBC. Instead, it featured 14 new and now forgotten songs, written for the production by Anthony Newley and Leslie Bricusse. The story was adapted by Andrew Birkin (who would subsequently become a leading Barrie scholar) and Jack Burns. Although part-funded by NBC with two American stars, most of the cast was British and it was shot at ATV's Elstree Studios, near London.

This version of Peter Pan won an Emmy for Outstanding Individual Achievement in Children's Programming for Jenn de Joux's and Elizabeth Savel's visual effects, and was nominated for Outstanding Children's Special, however it was not rebroadcast. But it was featured in 2011 at the Paley Center in New York City as part of the New York Musical Theatre Festival.

== Cast ==
- Mia Farrow ... Peter Pan
- Danny Kaye ... Captain Hook and Mr. Darling

(alphabetically)

- Lynsey Baxter ... Jane
- Peppi Borza ... Pirate
- Michael Crane ... Pirate
- Michael Deeks ... Curly
- Fred Evans ... Pirate
- Jill Gascoine ... Grown up Wendy
- John Gielgud ... Narrator
- George Harris ... Pirate
- Paula Kelly ... Tiger Lily
- Max Latimer ... Pirate
- Nicholas Lyndhurst ... Tootles
- Virginia McKenna ... Mrs. Darling
- Briony McRoberts ... Wendy Darling
- Joe Melia ... Starkey
- Peter O'Farrell ... Nana
- Adam Richens ... Nibs
- Ian Sharrock ... John Darling
- Adam Stafford ... Michael Darling
- Tony Sympson ... Smee
- Jerome Watts ... Slightly
