= Peppi Borza =

British-American dancer (1936–1990)

- Born: Giuseppe Mario Chaly Borza; 22 October 1936; Portsmouth, England
- Died: 24 July 1990 (aged 53); Maida Vale, London, England (Note: Oddly, his death does not appear on the GRO.)
- Other names: Pepe Borza; Pepi Borza
- Occupations: Actor, circus performer, entertainer, singer, dancer, songwriter, composer
- Years active: 194?–1989

Peppi Borza (22 October 1936 – 24 July 1990) was a British-American dancer, entertainer, songwriter, composer, actor, and circus performer.

== Early life ==
Born into a circus performing family and brought to Sarasota, Florida in 1940 by the Ringling Bros. and Barnum & Bailey Circus, Borza and his siblings were taught how to speak Italian and Spanish fluently (due to their father being of the former heritage and their mother the latter). As a result of the touring schedule of the circuses, the children would move from school to school to accommodate the destination. By 1949, Borza had attended his 59th school in seven years, enrolling in many states of the United States as well as eight foreign European countries including England.

He performed in a double act with his older sister Nita. The siblings were acrobats and performed with the likes of Sammy Davis Jr., Jack Benny and Judy Garland, as well as appearing twice on The Ed Sullivan Show. One of their acts was Stars of the Future, a balancing and tumbling act with Polack Bros. Circus.

The family also partook in charity work, often performing in benefits sponsored by Shriners Hospitals for Children while Borza and his sister performed their act for sick children in Florida hospitals. The pair were honoured by the Sarasota Chamber of Commerce for their extensive charity work in 1955. Despite the family's frequent travels, the Borzas always considered Sarasota their home.

Coming from a showbusiness family, Borza competed in local and state swimming, diving and gymnastic events during his adolescence, winning several awards. He also had a brief stint in the Army.

== Singer/songwriter ==
Encouraged by Sammy Davis Jr. and others that told him he had a good voice, Borza decided to become a singer. He came to England and formed the group Peppi and the New York Twisters. They performed in England, Ireland and New York City.

Borza also performed at The Cavern Club in Liverpool, teaching a young Cilla Black how to dance the Twist, having learnt himself from Chubby Checker. The dance was the inspiration behind his former group.

Despite recording several singles including The Skip (an attempt to start a new dance craze) and Pistol Packin' Mama, Borza's singing career was not a success.

In Britain, Borza became lifelong friends with singer Dusty Springfield (having first met The Springfields when they toured with Del Shannon), accompanying her on tours, as well as being a dancer on Ready Steady Go!. Borza was the partner of Dusty Springfield's brother Tom, and the couple collaborated on the writing of four songs: No Tears for Johnnie, Chain Gang Blues, The Skip and O Holy Child (recorded by Dusty Springfield in 1964 as a Christmas charity single for Barnardo's). In 1965, Borza co-wrote Matt Monro's single Before You Go.

Borza also worked as a composer on Dusty Springfield's The Christmas Album and several other projects, including with Matt Monro.

== Theatre and Screen ==
Borza performed on stage in London and New York. He appeared on Broadway in the original cast recording of Evita. He played a Muleteer in the original West End production of Man of La Mancha as well as the 1972 film version. He also appeared in Intimate Games (1976). Other roles include a pirate in the 1976 musical Peter Pan and a policeman in Gilbert and Sullivan's 1983 musical The Pirates of Penzance as well as playing a Vervoid in parts 11 and 12 of the Doctor Who saga The Trial of a Time Lord (segment: Terror of the Vervoids). He was in the 1985 cast of On Your Toes at the Palace Theatre, London.

Among Borza's final work was an appearance in the 1987 West End revival of Follies.

== Death ==
Borza died from AIDS. Dusty Springfield frequently visited him at the hospice as he neared the end of his life. Borza left money to his closest friend in his will.
