= Shirl Conway =

American actress (1916–2007)

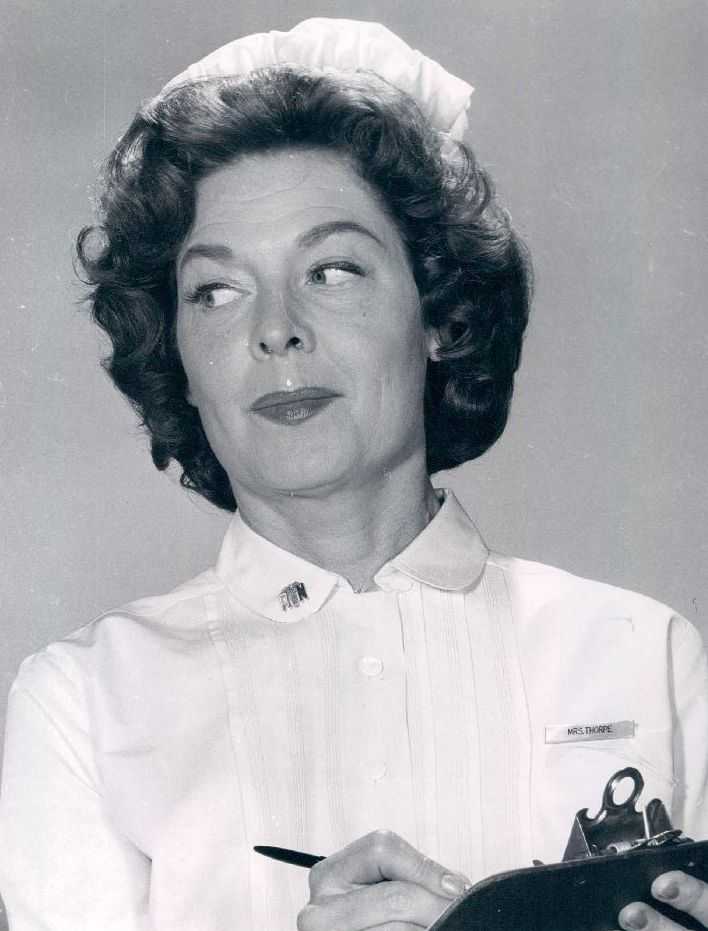
- Shirl Conway in The Nurses (1963)
- Born: Shirley Elizabeth Crosman; June 13, 1916
- Died: May 7, 2007 (aged 90)
- Education: University of Michigan
- Occupation: Actress
- Spouses: Gordon Larson; Bill Johnson

Shirl Conway (born Shirley Elizabeth Crosman, June 13, 1916 – May 7, 2007) was an American television and Broadway actress.

== Early years ==
A great-niece of actress Henrietta Crosman, Conway graduated from the University of Michigan in 1938 with a bachelor's degree in speech therapy. She was a John Robert Powers model.

== Career ==
Banjo Eyes (1940) was Conway's theatrical debut. She played Ruth Winters in the 1955 musical comedy Plain and Fancy on Broadway, for which she won a Theatre World Award. She also appeared on Broadway in Gentlemen Prefer Blondes and toured in Auntie Mame, including performances in the capital cities of Australia.

She played the role of Liz Thorpe in the CBS drama The Nurses (which ran from 1962 to 1965) for which she was nominated for an Emmy award in 1963 for Outstanding Continued Performance by an Actress in a Series. Other TV credits include Route 66, The Defenders, and Caesar's Hour.

She moved to Washington in 1972, where she was the founding member of the Harstine Island Theatre Club, and starred in productions there into her 80s.

== Personal life ==
Conway was married to engineer Gordon Larson and Bill Johnson, an actor.

== Selected filmography ==
- The Strangers Came (1949)
