= Naked Fury =

1959 British film by Charles Saunders

- British theatrical poster
- Directed by: Charles Saunders
- Written by: Guido Coen; Brock Williams
- Produced by: Guido Coen
- Starring: Reed De Rouen; Kenneth Cope; Leigh Madison
- Cinematography: Walter J. Harvey
- Edited by: Peter Pitt
- Music by: Edwin Astley
- Production company: Coenda Films
- Distributed by: Butcher's Film Service
- Release date: 1959
- Running time: 64 minutes
- Country: United Kingdom
- Language: English

Naked Fury (U.S. title: The Pleasure Lovers) is a 1959 British second feature ('B') crime thriller directed by Charles Saunders and starring Reed De Rouen, Kenneth Cope and Leigh Madison. It was written by Guido Coen and Brock Williams.

== Plot ==
Four criminals attack a night watchman while robbing a warehouse. After kidnapping the daughter of their victim, they hide. One of the robbers falls for their hostage, leading to tension between the thieves, especially when the night watchman succumbs to his injuries.

== Cast ==
- Reed De Rouen as Eddy
- Kenneth Cope as Johnny
- Leigh Madison as Carol
- Arthur Lovegrove as Syd
- Alexander Field as Vic
- Tommy Eytle as Steve
- Ann Lynn as Stella
- Marianne Brauns as Joy
- Arthur Gross as Tom Parker
- Redmond Phillips as Inspector Stevens
- Eric Woodburn as Frank Hawking
- Denis Shaw as Captain Horst

== Reception ==
Kine Weekly wrote: "Hard-boiled melodrama. ... The leading characters take it as well as dish it out; night club divertissement punctuates the rough stuff; and its salutary and spectacular climax is clear proof that crime doesn't pay. Good British 'second'."

Picturegoer wrote: "When it comes to crowding a quart into a pint pot, this melodrama wants a bit of beating. Bandits raid a safe, hold an innocent girl hostage, commit murders and are overtaken by retribution, in under the hour."

In British Sound Films David Quinlan wrote: "Second-feature is better than it sounds, holds the attention."

In The British 'B' Film, Chibnall and McFarlane wrote that it was "a film which takes the trouble to motivate its crooks and doesn't shirk a bleak ending."

In The Radio Times Guide to Films David Parkinson gave the film 1/5 stars, writing: "As with many other crime capers of the late 1950s, this gives the impression of being a routine TV episode that has had a bit of money thrown at it. Given the utterly misleading title of The Pleasure Lovers in the USA, this is a sordid little tale about a gang of safe-crackers who are forced to kill a night watchman and kidnap his daughter to make good their escape. Journeyman director Charles Saunders and his willing cast are left high and dry by Brock Williams's desperate script."
