= Roger Webb =

English musician

Roger Webb (7 April 1934 – 19 December 2002) was a British jazz pianist and composer best known for leading the Roger Webb Trio (1963–1965) and for the Roger Webb Orchestra. From the early 1970s he became a prolific composer of film scores as well as much library music for De Wolfe Music and others, and his music has been used for television and theatre productions.

== Early career ==
Born in Bristol, Webb was self-taught as a pianist, and first began performing during his national service with the Royal Air Force in Egypt. On his return to Britain he established himself as a jazz pianist and soon bandleader, initially in the clubs of Liverpool. The Roger Webb Trio was heard regularly on the Light Programme, and appeared regularly (1963–1965) at Harrison and Gibson's Trojan Room restaurant in Bromley, Kent. The band included Ken Baldock (bass), Roy Antis (drums) and Johnny Fourie (guitar). A Spanish waiter, Manuel Linares Alvaro, was often invited by Roger to sing with the trio.

At the same time Webb was working as a music director for West End theatres and was involved in the hit London production The Lord Chamberlain Regrets (1961) among other shows. He worked with Vera Lynn, Bette Davis, Eartha Kitt, Rex Harrison, Johnny Mathis, Shirley Bassey, Danny Williams and others.

== Recordings ==
The LP John, Paul and all that jazz, featuring jazz arrangements of 12 Lennon–McCartney songs and produced by Mickie Most, was issued in the US in July 1964, and in the UK in September 1964.

Webb's first two LPs for the De Wolfe Music library - Vocal Patterns: The Roger Webb Sound and Moonshade were issued in 1971, featuring the vocals of Barbara Moore, and jazz-soul-funk instrumental arrangements that set the tone for many subsequent albums of library music. Webb continued to record for De Wolfe into the 1990s. Moonshade was reissued by Be With Records in 2023.

== Film and TV ==
His film work included music for movies such as One Brief Summer (1970), Bartleby (1970), Burke & Hare (1971), Au Pair Girls (1972), Bedtime with Rosie (1974), The Amorous Milkman (1975), Intimate Games (1976), What's Up Nurse! (1977), The Godsend (1980), Death of a Centerfold: The Dorothy Stratten Story (1981), The Boy in Blue (1986), He's My Girl (1987), and Riders (1993).

His TV work includes the opening themes of Strange Report, Miss Jones and Son, Hammer House of Horror, The Gentle Touch and Paradise Postponed, and the opening theme used from series 2 onwards of George and Mildred, as well as incidental music for Love Thy Neighbour, Minder and The Sweeney. With Geoff Love he provided orchestral arrangements for The Last Will and Testament of Jake Thackray. He also worked with Dee Shipman on various songs and the music and lyrics for three musical concepts: A Kid For Two Farthings (based on the 1955 film of the Wolf Mankowitz modern classic story); The Last Touring Love Show; and Emma (based on the life of Emma Hamilton).

== Awards ==
His awards include the UNICEF Danny Kaye Award at the International Song Contest for his song Make Your Own Rainbow, with lyrics by Norman Newell, and first prize in the Paris International Film Festival for his score for the 1980 film The Godsend. He was nominated for a Golden Globe award for the television production Death of a Centrefold (1981).

== Personal life ==
Webb married the actress Margot Ley in September 1968. He had partially written a musical, Beloved Emma, when he was taken ill with a brain tumour. He died in December 2002 in Fulham at the age of 68, survived by his wife and daughter.

== Discography ==
- John, Paul and all that Jazz, The Roger Webb Trio. Parlophone, PMC 1233 (1964) reissued Rollercoaster Records RCCD3047 (2002) -
- "A-side", 1965 single produced by Mickie Most
- Vocal Patterns, The Roger Webb Sound. De Wolfe DWLP 3182 (1970)
- Moonshade. De Wolfe DWLP 3212 (1971)
- Before or After, (with Johnny Hawksworth). Sylvestor SMCLP 532 (1971)
- Free as Air. De Wolfe DWLP 3229 (1972)
- Roger Webb Plays Gershwin, The Roger Webb Trio. Music for Pleasure MFP 50099 (1973)
- Music by Roger Webb, Paul Dupont and his Orchestra. Chappell Recorded Music LPC 1062 (1974)
- Awakening. De Wolfe DWLP 3302 (1975)
- Like a Friend. De Wolfe DWLP 3312 (1975)
- Moments. De Wolfe DWLP 3294 (1975)
- Friday Girl. Rouge RMSLP 121 (1979)
- Natural Beauty. De Wolfe DWLP 3462 (1981)
- The Magic Of Cole Porter, Roger Webb Quartet. Warwick Records WW 5134 (1982)
- Midnight Magic, Roger Webb and his Orchestra. Warwick Records WW 5133 (1982)
- Remember. Rouge RMSLP 144 (1982)
- Who's Counting, with the Soul City Orchestra. De Wolfe DWLP 3480 (1982)
- Changing Seasons. Rouge RMSLP 175 (1987)
- Always and Forever, music for orchestra. De Wolfe DWCD 065 (1989)
- Off the Cuff, music for piano. De Wolfe DWCD 081 (1990)
