= Donovan Winter =

British film director and writer (1933–2015)

Donovan Winter

Donovan Winter (1933 – 6 February 2015) was a British filmmaker and former actor. Through his company, Donwin Productions, he was a writer, producer, director and editor of short and feature films.

Winter was born to Irish parents in London in 1933 and died on 6 February 2015 in the UK, aged 82.

== Select credits ==
- Stand by to Shoot (1953) – Captain
- Awakening Hour (short film, 1957)
- The Great Expedition (short film, 1959)
- The Trunk (1961)
- World Without Shame (1962)
- Come Back Peter (1969)
- Sunday in the Park (short film, 1970)
- Escort Girls (1974)
- The Deadly Females (1976)
- Give Us Tomorrow (1978)
