= The Trunk (film) =

1961 British film by Donovan Winter

- Original 1961 poster
- Directed by: Donovan Winter
- Screenplay by: Donovan Winter
- Story by: Edward Abraham; Valerie Abraham
- Produced by: Lawrence Huntington
- Starring: Philip Carey; Julia Arnall; Dermot Walsh
- Cinematography: Norman Warwick
- Edited by: Reginald Beck
- Music by: John Fox
- Production company: Donwin Films
- Distributed by: Columbia Pictures
- Release dates: 13 February 1961 (United Kingdom); 6 September 1961 (United States)
- Running time: 72 minutes
- Country: United Kingdom
- Language: English

The Trunk is a 1961 British low budget black and white mystery film directed by Donovan Winter and starring Phil Carey, Julia Arnall and Dermot Walsh. It was written by Winter based on a story by Edward Abraham and Valerie Abraham.

== Plot ==
Trouble ensues when Lisa marries Henry, a British lawyer. Lisa's jealous ex-boyfriend Stephen decides to take revenge by convincing her that she has killed Diane, her husband's ex-girlfriend. Lisa gives Stephen the money he wants to keep quiet and dispose of the corpse. Unfortunately, the dead woman's other ex-lover, Nicholas, sees the two together. After getting his money from Lisa, Stephen puts Diane's body in a trunk and drives to an isolated area. There he discovers that the woman is not feigning death; she has been killed by the jealous Nicholas, in a manner that will incriminate Stephen.

== Cast ==
- Phil Carey as Stephen Dorning
- Julia Arnall as Lisa Maitland
- Dermot Walsh as Henry Maitland
- Vera Day as Diane
- Peter Swanwick as Nicholas Steiner
- John Atkinson as Matt
- Betty Le Beau as Maria
- Tony Quinn as porter
- Robert Sansom as bank manager
- Pippa Stanley as Mrs. Stanhope
- Richard Nellor as Sir Hubert
- Nicholas Tanner as policeman

== Critical reception ==
The Monthly Film Bulletin wrote: "Frame-ups, red herrings, theatrical atmosphere and a twist ending, all equally unbelievable, add up to a utility piece of melodramatic nonsense, nowhere really clever enough to arouse much enthusiasm."

TV Guide wrote, "the movie is badly produced and too seamy for its own good."

In The New York Times, Bosley Crowther wrote, "now that the British are importing American actors to commit homicide in their low-budget movies, they seem to have lost their flair." Crowther called it a "foolish melodrama" that is "several kilometers removed from Agatha Christie."

Sky Movies called it a "creepy little thriller" that is "hugely enjoyable. The director doesn't miss a trick at tightening up the suspense."
