= Melissa (1964 TV series) =

1964 British BBC TV series

- Genre: Thriller
- Written by: Francis Durbridge
- Directed by: Alan Bromly
- Starring: Tony Britton; Helen Christie
- Country of origin: United Kingdom
- Original language: English
- No. of series: 1
- No. of episodes: 6

Production
- Producer: Alan Bromly
- Running time: 30 min
- Production company: BBC

Original release
- Network: BBC Two
- Release: 26 April – 31 May 1964

Melissa is a 1964 British thriller television series that originally aired in six parts on BBC 2 in 1964. It was shown under the umbrella title Francis Durbridge Presents, and was one of a number of serials written by Francis Durbridge during the period. It was remade in 1974 and again, with a script by Alan Bleasdale, in 1997.

== Cast ==
- Tony Britton as Guy Foster (6 episodes)
- Helen Christie as Paula Hepburn (6 episodes)
- Brian McDermott as Don Page (6 episodes)
- Kerry Jordan as Felix Hepburn (5 episodes)
- Norman Scace as Dr Norman Swanley (5 episodes)
- Elizabeth Weaver as Joyce Dean (5 episodes)
- Richard Wilding as DS Gibbs (3 episodes)
- Michael Collins as George Antrobus (2 episodes)
- Elizabeth Craven as Mrs Long (2 episodes)
- Sydney Dobson as Chauffeur (2 episodes)
- Carole Mowlam as Mary Antrobus (2 episodes)
- Ian Norris as Jackson (2 episodes)
- Martin Norton as Peter Antrobus (2 episodes)
- John Marcus Powell as Man in car park (2 episodes)
- Reg Pritchard as Duncan (2 episodes)
- Petra Davies as Melissa Foster (1 episode)
- Lennard Pearce as DS Heston (1 episode)
- Anthony Sagar as George (1 episode)
- Patricia Marmont as Carol Stewart (1 episode)

== DVD ==
The series has been released to DVD in an Australian box set, along with three other titles as Francis Durbridge Presents - Volume 1.

== Bibliography ==
- Ellen Baskin. Serials on British Television, 1950-1994. Scolar Press, 1996.
