= Annabel Leventon =

English actress (born 1942)

Judith Annabel Leventon (born 20 April 1942 in Hertfordshire, England) is an English actress who has acted in various roles on stage and television.

While reading English at the University of Oxford she made several appearances at the Oxford Playhouse and toured France as Desdemona in the Oxford University Dramatic Society's production of Othello. She then joined the Fourbeats pop group, played at the Edinburgh Festival and continued in various other OUDS productions.

On obtaining her BA she gained a grant to LAMDA and made her professional stage debut in Leicester. In December 1967 she left for America where she joined Tom O' Horgan's La MaMa troupe in New York and worked with them for seven months before returning to Britain. She was in the original London cast of Hair in 1968 at the Shaftesbury Theatre, also directed by O'Horgan. She went on to direct and appear in the show in Paris. She also appeared in the original London production of The Rocky Horror Show.

Her first TV appearance was in The White Rabbit in 1967, and she went on to appear in a number of long-running series over the next four decades.

Her film credits include roles in Come Back Peter (1969), Le Mur de l'Atlantique (1970), Every Home Should Have One (1970), The Rocky Horror Picture Show (1975), Shock Treatment (1981), Real Life (1984), Defence of the Realm (1986), M. Butterfly (1993), Wimbledon (2004) and A Royal Night Out (2015).

In 2013, Leventon appeared in the role of Constance, the Madwoman of the Flea Market, in the British premiere of Jerry Herman's Dear World at the Charing Cross Theatre, London. In 2023, Leventon appeared in the role of Edith Tellmann in the British premiere of Bjørg Vik's The Journey to Venice at the Finborough Theatre, London. For this role, she was nominated for an Offie for Lead Performance in a Play.

She is the author of The Real Rock Follies: The Great Girl Band Rip-Off of 1976, released in 2017.

== TV appearances ==
Programme	Year	Part
ITV Playhouse	1969	
Comedy Playhouse	1972	
Dixon of Dock Green	1974	
The New Avengers	1976	Wendy
Van der Valk	1977	
Penmarric	1979	
Minder	1982	Muriel Standen
Crown Court	1974–1982	
Alas Smith and Jones	1984	
Mussolini: The Untold Story	1985	
Dempsey and Makepeace	1986	
Boon	1987	
Bergerac	1989	
A Touch of Frost	1992	
Casualty	1995	
London Bridge	1998	
North Square	2000	
Doctors	2004	
Ian Fleming: Bondmaker	2005	
Lennon Naked	2010	
New Tricks	2011	
On Giant's Shoulders	1979	Marjorie Wallace

== Discography ==
- Hair (Original London Cast Recording) 1968
