= Ann Lynn =

British actress (1933–2020)

- Lynn in the film Separation (1968)
- Born: Elizabeth Ann Lynn; 7 November 1933; Fulham, London, England
- Died: 30 August 2020 (aged 86)
- Occupation: Actress
- Years active: 1956–1996
- Spouse: Anthony Newley (m. 1956; div. 1963)
- Children: 1

Elizabeth Ann Lynn (7 November 1933 – 30 August 2020) was a British actress, especially prominent during the British New Wave of the 1960s, appearing in many films that represented what is known as kitchen sink realism.

Lynn's career spanned 40 years and included roles in many British TV series, including The Count of Monte Cristo (1956), The Vise (1959–1960), Danger Man (1965), The Saint, Gideon's Way (1965), Public Eye (1966), The Champions (1972), Special Branch (1973), Just Good Friends (1984–1986) Minder and Only Fools And Horses.

== Film ==
Lynn's films included Flame in the Streets (1961); Strongroom (1961); A Shot in the Dark (1964); Four in the Morning (1965); I'll Never Forget What's'isname (1967); Baby Love (1968); and Screamtime (1983), alongside Dora Bryan and Robin Bailey.

== Personal life ==
Lynn was a great-niece of the comedy actor Ralph Lynn. She married Anthony Newley in August 1956. They divorced on 26 April 1963. Their only child Simon was born with spina bifida and died while an infant.

== Partial filmography ==
- Johnny, You're Wanted (1956) – Chorine (uncredited)
- Keep It Clean (1956) – Chorus Girl
- Moment of Indiscretion (1958) – Pauline
- Naked Fury (1959) – Stella
- Piccadilly Third Stop (1960) – Mouse
- The Wind of Change (1961) – Jose Marley
- Strip Tease Murder (1961) – Rita
- Flame in the Streets (1961) – Judy Gomez
- The Secret Thread (1962) (TVM) - Ida
- H.M.S. Defiant (1962) – Young wife whose husband is pressed (uncredited)
- Strongroom (1962) – Rose Taylor
- Doctor in Distress (1963) – Mrs. Whittaker
- Espionage (TV series) ('Final Decision', episode) (1964) - Joanna
- A Shot in the Dark (1964) – Dudu
- The System (1964) – Ella
- The Black Torment (1964) – Diane
- The Party's Over (1965) – Libby
- Four in the Morning (1965) – Girl
- Danger Man (1965) Episode: Have a Glass of Wine – Suzanne
- The Uncle (1966) – Sally Morton
- I'll Never Forget What's'isname (1967) – Carla
- Separation (1968) – Woman
- Baby Love (1969) – Amy
- The Love Machine (1971) – Model (uncredited)
- The Spy's Wife (1972) – (uncredited)
- The Other Side of the Underneath (1972)
- Hitler: The Last Ten Days (1973) – Fraulein Junge
- Who Pays the Ferryman? (1977) - Lorna Matthews
- Screamtime (1983) – Lena
