= Escort Girls =

1974 British film by Donovan Winter

- UK DVD cover
- Directed by: Donovan Winter
- Written by: Donovan Winter
- Produced by: Donovan Winter
- Starring: Helen Christie; Marijke Mann; Barbara Wise; Brian Jackson
- Cinematography: Gus Coma; Austin Parkinson
- Edited by: Donovan Winter
- Production company: Donwin Productions
- Distributed by: Variety
- Release date: 1974
- Running time: 95 minutes
- Country: United Kingdom
- Language: English

Escort Girls is a 1974 sexploitation film written, produced and directed by Donovan Winter. It stars Helen Christie, Brian Jackson, David Dixon, Veronica Doran and David Brierly. Its working title was All Lovers Are Strangers.

== Plot ==
Set in London, the film tells six stories of people seeking companionship in the run-up to Christmas.

- Hugh and Susan: Hugh, a young office clerk, spends his Christmas bonus on a night out with Susan, a social escort. After dinner at an Italian restaurant, they take a taxi back to Susan's flat, where both admit their loneliness. Susan takes Hugh's virginity.
- Mary and Barry: Mary is a wealthy widow whose outward pride conceals her inner loneliness. She takes a young male escort, Barry, to a nightclub and then back to her hotel room. Barry is put off by Mary's overbearing nature and slips away while her back is turned, leaving her heartbroken.
- Emma and Wayne: Emma is a company director weary of the business world. As an amusement, she hires a male escort, Wayne, to accompany her to a high-level Christmas party. Returning to Emma's house, Emma and Wayne have sex.
- Harvey and Sheila: Harvey Matelow is a corrupt businessman who books an escort, Sheila, to take with him to a casino. Later, he tricks his way into her flat and rapes her. He is interrupted by Sheila's boyfriend, who photographs him in the act and proceeds to blackmail him, stealing his money and threatening to publish the photographs if he goes to the police. Realising that he has been set up, the humiliated Harvey is kicked out of the flat. Left alone, Sheila and the boyfriend have sex.
- Vicky and Lester: To impress her old school friends, Vicky shows up at a reunion accompanied by Lester, a black male escort who has agreed to pose as her fiancé. Over the course of the party, Vicky's female friends fantasise about Lester and discreetly pass him their telephone numbers. Back at Vicky's flat, Lester hesitantly indulges Vicky's interracial rape fantasy.
- James and Ian are Scotsmen visiting London for the first time. They pick up two women and take them to dinner at a restaurant, where they are shocked to see an exotic dancer give an explicit solo sex show. After leaving the restaurant, they pursue the two women for sex. The women knock them to the ground and they drunkenly pass out.

In the film's epilogue, the normally shy and reserved Hugh arrives at work and greets his female colleagues by cheerfully slapping one of them on the rear with his morning newspaper.

== Cast ==
- Maria O'Brien as Susan
- David Dixon as Hugh
- Helen Christie as Mary
- Richard Wren as Barry
- Marijke Mann as Emma
- Gil Barber as Wayne
- Brian Jackson as Harvey Matelow
- Barbara Wise as Sheila
- Veronica Doran as Vicky
- Ken Gajadhar as Lester
- David Brierly as James
- James Hunter as Ian
- Teresa Van Ross as dancer
- Max Mason as Sheila's boyfriend

== Critical response ==
Gavin Millar of The Listener gave the film one star out of four. Reviews in The Daily Telegraph, the Daily Mail and The Guardian were negative.

Richard Combs of The Monthly Film Bulletin described Escort Girls as a "sexploiter with pretensions" whose acting "is better than might be expected." He added that Winter "profitably pays as much attention to all the background flummery of the social settings ... as he does to the walking clichés who inhabit them."

Duncan Fallowell of The Spectator questioned the choice of title, pointing out that the film features both female and male escorts. He commented: "This may not be a withering triumph of cinematic art, but it is certainly a sight better than most of the films into whose bag it has been put ... The stories do have point – not much, perhaps, but what there is you do get – and it does add up to more than an excuse for titillation. Also I chuckled a lot, if that is any recommendation."

In his introduction to Nucleus Films' 2011 DVD release of Escort Girls, Darius Drewe praised the film as Winter's best demonstration of his "multi-layered", "singular" vision. He suggested that while the film touches on themes of realism and loneliness, certain elements, such as the story of Emma and Wayne, are more about "how sometimes life is neither tragedy nor fairy tale, just matter-of-factly unremarkable." He criticised the pacing, commenting that the plot "seems to amble sexlessly for 60 minutes before remembering what film it's in and suddenly jumping to several consecutive scenes of softcore action." He compared the structure of the film – "a series of vignettes" – to that of the comedy drama Saturday Night Out (1964).

In a review for website The Spinning Image, Graeme Clark comments: "Until the cast begin taking their clothes off, this is achingly slow, and you're not sure if it's meant to be a comedy or not, but things pick up when the mood turns to sleaze ... [All the characters except Hugh] … come across as pretty strange, illustrating the gap between the sophistication it aspired to and the rather sour, seedy reality it ended up as."

Commentator Leon Hunt considers Escort Girls to be one of a number of films that he dubs "suburban report" features: films employing a "multiple narrative" built around a "thematic focus" (in this case, characters' use of escorts) "and/or a narrator, storyteller or 'expert' to guide us through". He suggests that the virginal character David roots the film's impression of "suburban sensibility" in ideas of a "last sexual outpost" or "notion of 'catching up', a sort of sexual democracy."

== See also ==
- List of Christmas films
