= The Strangers Came =

- Original trade ad
- Directed by: Alfred Travers
- Written by: Tom Duggan; Alfred Healy; Alfred Travers
- Produced by: Roger Proudlock; Nigel Proudlock; Michael Healy
- Starring: Tommy Duggan; Shirl Conway; Shamus Locke
- Cinematography: Cyril Arapoff
- Edited by: Ernest Hilton
- Music by: Eamonn O'Gallagher
- Production company: Vandyke Productions
- Distributed by: Grand National Pictures
- Release date: December 1949
- Running time: 67 minutes
- Country: United Kingdom
- Language: English

The Strangers Came (also known as You Can't Fool an Irishman) is a 1949 British second feature ('B') comedy film directed by Alfred Travers and starring Tommy Duggan, Shirl Conway and Shamus Locke. It was written by Duggan, Alfred Healy and Travers and made by Vandyke Productions.

== Plot ==
A self-important American filmmaker goes to a small Irish village with plans to make a movie about the life of St Patrick.

== Cast ==
- Tommy Duggan as Stefan Wurlitz
- Shirl Conway as Jane McDonald
- Shamus Locke as Tom O'Flaherty
- Tony Quinn as hotelier
- Reed De Rouen as manager
- Eve Eacott as Donna del Monte
- Josephine Fitzgerald as widow McDermott
- Sheila Martin as Mary Laffey
- Geoffrey Goodheart as Joe Bantham

== Production ==
Some of the film was shot on location in Ireland.

== Reception ==
The Monthly Film Bulletin wrote: "The theme has possibilities which are not fulfilled due to the script's feeble attempts at wit, and amateurish acting by minor members of the cast. A very poor relation of Whisky Galore."

Variety wrote: "Imported from Eire, You Can't Fool An Irishman burlesques Hollywood in an amateurish way. The comedy is broad and the situations occasionally reminiscent of Mack Sennett. Picture offers little for general U. S. release, but may eke out a fair return if carefully marketed in Hibernian neighborhoods."
