= The Legend of Robin Hood (TV series) =

Television series

- Written by: Robert Banks Stewart; David Butler; Alexander Baron; Alistair Bell
- Directed by: Eric Davidson
- Starring: Martin Potter; Diane Keen; William Marlowe; John Abineri; David Dixon; Michael-John Jackson; Paul Darrow
- Music by: Stanley Myers
- Country of origin: United Kingdom
- No. of episodes: 6

Production
- Producer: George Gallaccio
- Editor: Peter Evans
- Running time: 50 minutes

Original release
- Network: BBC 1
- Release: 23 November – 28 December 1975

The Legend of Robin Hood was a 1975 BBC television serial that told the story of the life of Robin Hood. It's noted as a version of Robin Hood that particularly values having "depicted the 12th century accurately".

== Plot ==
Robin, raised as a forester by John Hood, finds out he is actually the long lost son of the late Earl of Huntington. Robin is told to go to London and see King Richard I with the Huntington signet ring and a letter. On his way to see the king, he helps the Lady Marion, who is to be married to Sir Guy of Gisborne on the order of her uncle, Sir Kenneth Neston. Robin is ordered by the king to become his squire. Robin is captured by monks and so cannot reach the king in time to leave for the Crusades. The Sheriff of Nottingham tells the king that Robin of Huntington renounces his title and refuses to go on the Crusade, and the king, angered, declares Robin Hood an outlaw and to be killed on sight. Robin's gang of outlaws struggle to get food because the forest is swarming with guards and finally decide that everyone using the forest roads must pay them a toll, and the guards are to enter at their own peril. The king is captured and held for ransom. Queen Eleanor tells Robin Hood that to get the ransom money, he should rob the tax money from the Sheriff, who has kept it illegally with permission from Prince John. Prince John is voted to become the regent, but King Richard returns just as he seizes power. The king sits outside Nottingham Castle with an army to arrest the Sheriff and end up capturing him with the aid of Robin Hood as the Sheriff attempts to escape via a secret tunnel. Robin Hood is poisoned by Marguerite, Sir Guy's sister, to get revenge for her brother's death at his hands, and he is eventually killed by it.

== Broadcast ==
The serial was broadcast by the BBC in the Sunday "tea time slot". The serial was also broadcast by PBS in the United States. It was rated and advertised as a “family serial.”

== Cast ==
- Martin Potter as Robin Hood
- Diane Keen as Lady Marion
- William Marlowe as Sir Guy of Gisbourne
- Paul Darrow as Sheriff of Nottingham
- Michael-John Jackson as King Richard I
- David Dixon as Prince John
- Miles Anderson as Will Scarlet
- Tony Caunter as Friar Tuck
- Conrad Asquith as Little John
- Yvonne Mitchell as Queen Eleanor
- John Abineri as Sir Kenneth Neston
- Anthony Garner as Earl of Huntingdon
- Tony Doyle as Norman Sergeant
- David Ryall as the Abbot of Grantham
- Martin Duncan as Blondin
- Stephen Whittaker as Ralph Gammon
- Roy Marsden as Military Prior

== Reception ==
Clive James praised The Legend of Robin Hood in The Observer, describing it as "a promising series. Neatly written, well acted, finely dressed and softly filmed like Akenfield." Bernard Davies in Broadcast remarked that “at long last someone has recalled the BBC to a sense of its proper duty” and that The Legend of Robin Hood “stands in the true succession of Sunday afternoon serials with something for everybody."

== Controversy ==
Mary Whitehouse and the National Viewers' and Listeners' Association attacked The Legend of Robin Hood, saying the programme displayed "extreme violence and sadism" and was not suitable for children. One shot in the programme - of a dead man with blood on his face - was singled out for particular criticism by the NVLA. The BBC defended the show by stating that it had been approved by senior BBC executives, and had also been promoted as a programme for parents and children to watch together, with "something for everybody" to enjoy. Discussing the controversy, television historian James Chapman stated: "Viewed today, The Legend of Robin Hood does not seem particularly violent, certainly not in comparison to Arthur of the Britons".

== Media Information ==
An illustrated television tie-in with “exclusive full-colour covers” and featuring stills from The Legend of Robin Hood was written by Carola Oman and published on November 13, 1975 alongside a television tie-in for the BBC serial North & South (1975).

== See also ==
- List of films and television series featuring Robin Hood
