= Lost (1956 film) =

1956 British film directed by Guy Green

- A poster bearing the film's alternative title: Tears for Simon
- Directed by: Guy Green
- Written by: Janet Green
- Produced by: Vivian Cox
- Starring: David Farrar; David Knight; Julia Arnall
- Cinematography: Harry Waxman
- Edited by: Anne V. Coates
- Music by: Benjamin Frankel
- Production company: Rank Organisation Film Productions
- Distributed by: J. Arthur Rank Film Distributors (UK); Republic Pictures (US)
- Release date: 31 January 1956 (London)
- Running time: 89 minutes
- Country: United Kingdom
- Language: English

Lost (also known as Tears for Simon) is a 1956 British thriller film directed by Guy Green and written by Janet Green, starring David Farrar, David Knight and Julia Arnall. It is set in 1950s London and revolves around the apparent kidnapping of a young couple's baby.

== Plot ==
US embassy employee Lee Cochrane and his Austrian wife discover their 18-month-old son Simon has been abducted after their nanny leaves the child unattended outside of a chemist's shop. London detective Inspector Craig pledges to find the child, though clues are scarce.

The couple are criticized in a newspaper article. They and the police follow up various leads which turn out to be dead ends, including supposed kidnappers who are con artists.

Eventually, the wife of one of the officers recognizes the words in a torn piece of paper as belonging to a particular novel. This enables the police to track down a copy of the novel that was borrowed from the library by a widow who had been seen with the baby. It is discovered that she lost her own baby after her husband drowned and she kidnapped the Cochranes.

== Cast ==
- David Farrar as Detective Inspector Craig
- David Knight as Lee Cochrane
- Julia Arnall as Sue Cochrane
- Anthony Oliver as Sergeant Lyel
- Thora Hird as Kelly's landlady
- Eleanor Summerfield as Sergeant Cook
- Anne Paige as nanny
- Marjorie Rhodes as Mrs. Jeffries
- Anna Turner as Alma Robey
- Everley Gregg as viscountess
- Meredith Edwards as Sergeant Davies
- Anita Sharp-Bolster as Miss Gill (billed as Anita Bolster)
- Beverly Brooks as Pam, telephone operator (uncredited)
- Joan Hickson as shop assistant in chemist's shop
- Joan Sims as ice cream seller
- Barbara Windsor as girl in chemist's shop (uncredited)
- Shirley Anne Field as Miss Carter, daughter of garage/taxi service proprietor (uncredited)
- George Woodbridge as Mr. Carter, garage proprietor (uncredited)
- Dandy Nichols as greengrocer's shop assistant
- Alma Taylor as Mrs. Bellamy (uncredited)
- Mona Washbourne as library manageress (uncredited)
- John Welsh police scientist (uncredited)

== Production ==
It was produced by Sydney Box who returned to Rank after a long absence.

The film was shot in Pinewood. Stars David Knight and Julia Arnall had recently signed with the Rank Organisation Film Productions and been in The Young Lovers and Simon and Laura respectively. Filming took place in September 1955.

== Critical reception ==
The Monthly Film Bulletin wrote: "Hackneyed situations and conventional characterization prevent this melodrama from developing much in the way of tension or emotional conviction, and flat direction has done little to prop up a contrived script. Performances generally are barely adequate, although there are characteristically assured sketches from Thora Hird and Joan Sims."

Kine Weekly wrote: "Intriguing and unusual story, first-class acting and direction, popular cast, smooth dialogue, irresistible feminine angle, good atmosphere, thrilling finale and Eastman Color."

Variety called it "a tightly made meller" which "backs plenty of dramatic suspense but lacks the quality to make it a really absorbing entertainment...Farrar's solid performance is always believable. Knight plays in a single key which tends to become slightly monotonous while Miss Arnall, an attractive newcomer, shows promise for a bright future. Eleanor Summerfield, Anthony Oliver and Thora Hird turn in standard portrayals in support. There's a delightful cameo by Joan Sims as an ice-cream girl. Guy Green's direction extracts most of the suspense from Janet Green's screenplay. Benjamin Frankel's music and Harry Waxman's lensing are plus features."

Filmink called the film gripping although felt it would have been more suspenseful without the husband character.

Allmovie wrote: "This nail-biting film is filled to capacity with many of Britain's top supporting players, including Thora Hird, Everley Gregg, Joan Sims, Shirley Anne Field, Joan Hickson, Dandy Nichols, Mona Washbourne, Barbara Windsor and George Woodbridge."

The Radio Times wrote, "this film succeeds because it confronts every parent's nightmare: what happens when you suddenly look away and find your child is missing when you look back? Of course, this being a class-riddled Rank picture, it's the nanny who loses the baby, but it's pretty harrowing nonetheless, despite the casting of insipid David Knight and Julia Arnall as baby Simon's parents. Granite-faced cop David Farrar is on hand to bring grit to screenwriter Janet Green's earnest chase movie, and not-so-hidden among the red herrings are a welter of British character players, with particularly impressive work from Thora Hird. The little-known Anna Turner also gives a fine performance as the tormented baby-snatcher, and Harry Waxman's colour location photography is superb, but the cliff-top climax is a little hard to believe."
