= Russell Gay =

British photographer

- Born: c. 1916
- Known for: Founder of Fiesta and Knave magazines
- Style: Glamour photography
- Spouse: Patricia Maureen Rose

Russell Gay (born c. 1916) was a British glamour photographer. He was known in the 1950s for his discovery of the model Sabrina. In 1957, Gay was described by Art and Photography magazine as "the UK’s top glamour photographer".

In the 1960s, under the name Mistral Films, Gay produced a series of low-budget films distributed on 8 mm film, including World Without Shame, and the sex/horror short film Blood Lust. In 1966, Gay launched the soft-core pornographic magazine Fiesta, followed by its more upmarket sister magazine Knave in 1968.

He was the first husband of Patricia Maureen Rose, who was 32 years younger than him. She was later to marry the billionaire John Kluge.

Gay moved to live in Monaco in the 1980s, selling his magazine business to the magazines' printing company.

== See also ==
- Harrison Marks
- Paul Raymond
- David Sullivan
- Stanley Long
