= Melissa (1997 TV series) =

British television mini-series

- DVD cover
- Genre: Crime drama
- Based on: Melissa by Francis Durbridge
- Written by: Alan Bleasdale
- Directed by: Bill Anderson
- Starring: Tim Dutton; Jennifer Ehle; Julie Walters; Adrian Dunbar; Christopher Ryan; Gary Cady; Diana Weston; Bill Paterson; Michael Angelis
- Composer: Richard Harvey
- Country of origin: United Kingdom
- Original language: English
- No. of series: 1
- No. of episodes: 5

Production
- Executive producer: Alan Bleasdale
- Producer: Keith Thompson
- Cinematography: Dick Dodd
- Editor: Colin Green
- Running time: 55—70 minutes
- Production companies: Diplomat Films; Channel 4 Television Corporation

Original release
- Network: Channel 4
- Release: 12 May – 20 May 1997

Melissa is a five-part British television crime drama series, written and produced by screenwriter Alan Bleasdale, that broadcast across five nights from 12 to 20 May 1997 on Channel 4. Based upon the 1964 play by playwright Francis Durbridge, the series stars Tim Dutton, Julie Walters and Adrian Dunbar in the principal roles, and is the fourth adaptation of the play for television, following the 1964 original, an Italian adaptation in 1966, and a BBC adaptation in 1974 starring Peter Barkworth and Joan Benham.

Notably, the first three episodes are based entirely upon a single line of dialogue featured in the original play, and have been described as somewhat of a "prequel" to the original. The complete series was released via 4DVD on 12 June 2006, available as an individual title or in a box set with two of Bleasdale's other Channel 4 productions, G.B.H and Jake's Progress.

== Reception ==
The series received a number of particularly critical reviews in the press, a fact Bleasdale himself picked up upon during an interview with Robert Chalmers for The Independent in 2010, commenting; "That got some pretty unkind reviews, didn't it?".

The series was Bleasdale's last production for Channel 4, after a six-year relationship with the channel's then-controller, Michael Grade. During The Independent interview, journalist Robert Chalmers noted that the critical reviews of Melissa were partly down to his relationship with Grade. Chalmers commented; "You know what your enemies say, don't you? I was talking to one recently. He told me: 'Alan got too powerful in the 1990s. He was over-indulged by Michael Grade at Channel 4. Now he's paying the price.'" Bleasdale replied; "Michael Grade was bliss to work for. And he wasn't easy. But he was straightforward and honest."

== Cast ==
- Tim Dutton as Guy Foster
- Jennifer Ehle as Melissa McKensie
- Julie Walters as Paula Hepburn
- Adrian Dunbar as Graeme Hepburn
- Christopher Ryan as Les Maurice
- Gary Cady as Don Page
- Diana Weston as Hope Magenta
- Bill Paterson as D.C.I. Cameron
- Michael Angelis as D.I. Kilshaw
- Gary Bleasdale as Statto
- Andrew Schofield as Charlton Foulkes
- David Ross as Selwyn Swanton
- Hugh Quarshie as George Bond
