= Circles of Deceit =

British television series

- Genre: Thriller
- Written by: Wesley Burrowes; John Brown; Ray Jenkins; Barry Appleton
- Directed by: Geoffrey Sax; Nicholas Laughland; Alan Grint; Peter Barber-Fleming
- Starring: Dennis Waterman; Susan Jameson; Derek Jacobi; Dave Hill
- Theme music composer: Bruce Broughton
- Composer: Tim Souster
- Country of origin: United Kingdom
- Original language: English
- No. of series: 2
- No. of episodes: 4

Production
- Executive producers: David Reynolds; Andrew Benson (1994–1996)
- Producers: Andrew Benson (1993); Simon Lewis
- Cinematography: Robbie Greenberg; Alan Pyrah
- Editors: Michael Brown; Neil Thompson; Alan Jones
- Running time: 100 minutes
- Production company: Yorkshire Television

Original release
- Network: ITV
- Release: 16 October 1993 – 23 December 1996

Circles of Deceit is a British television thriller series, produced by Yorkshire Television, first broadcast on ITV on 16 October 1993.

The series stars Dennis Waterman as John Neil, a former SAS officer, and Falklands veteran, later recruited as an agent and investigator for the Security Service (MI5). Some years previously Neil's wife and child were killed by an IRA bomb. In his despair, Neil turned to drink and quit the service. He took refuge from the world in a remote house deep in the Yorkshire countryside, until MI5 come calling with a job offer he can't refuse, however reluctantly.

A VHS video of the self-titled pilot was released in the US in 1994. The complete series was later released on Region 1 DVD in the US by Acorn Media on 17 May 2011. On 23 April 2018, nearly twenty-five years after the broadcast of the self-titled pilot, the complete series was released on Region 2 DVD in the UK by Strawberry Media.

== Production ==
The series was filmed in and around Leeds and across Yorkshire. Set-up shots or on-screen captions are used to establish particular or specific places like London, Belfast or Paris, where required.

Leeds city centre locations include: County Arcade, Leeds Town Hall, The Bourse, Trevelyan Square, City Square, the chessboards on Victoria Square outside the central library, the Cinder Moor, and Headingley Hill Congregational Church. Several streets in the Burley and Hyde Park areas, including Woodhouse Lane are also recognisable.

The canal path, back roads, waste ground, and derelict buildings in the Camp Fields area south of Leeds city centre were used, but this area has been redeveloped to the point of being virtually unrecognisable today. Bradford is ten miles west of Leeds, and parts of City Hall stood in for the Palace of Westminster.

Various Leeds University buildings are also featured, including the interior of the Brotherton Library and Parkinson Court, interiors and exteriors of the Roger Stevens Building, and a section of the "red route" corridor in the Mathematics and Earth Sciences Building.

Rural locations north east of Leeds include the villages of Linton and Sicklinghall, and the stately Bramham Park House, all near Wetherby. North west of Leeds, filming took place at sections of Fewston and Swinsty reservoirs, and the environs of RAF Menwith Hill.

A total of four feature-length episodes were made, including the self-titled pilot in 1993, followed by a series of three episodes, filmed in 1995, and broadcast between 1995 and 1996. Although broadcast as the final episode of the series, Sleeping Dogs is set chronologically after the events of the self-titled pilot (which was re-titled The Wolves are Howling for disambiguation reasons on repeat broadcasts and home video release). In the pilot, Neil's MI5 handler is played by Derek Jacobi using the name Randal. For the series, his handler is replaced by "Zero" played by Susan Jameson, credited as the Controller. The only other recurring character throughout the series was Andy, a wheelchair-using researcher and collator, played by Dave Hill.

== Cast ==
- Dennis Waterman as John Neil
- Derek Jacobi as Controller aka 'Randal' (1.1)
- Susan Jameson as Controller (2.1 — 2.3)
- Dave Hill as Andy (2.1 — 2.3)

The Wolves are Howling

- Peter Vaughan as Liam McAuley
- Clare Higgins as Eilish
- Ian McElhinney as Father Fergal
- Tony Doyle as Graham
- Colum Convey as Dessie Gill
- Gerard Crossan as Colum McAuley
- Andrew Connolly as Dermot McAuley

Sleeping Dogs

- Leo McKern as Alexander Petrov
- Frances Barber as Annie Shepherd
- Paul Freeman as Armitage
- Nicholas Jones as Schroeder
- Bill Armstrong as Bill Roper
- Lalor Roddy as Mark Grady
- Ian Fitzgibbon as Tony Lynch
- James Aubrey as George Grant

Dark Secret

- Corin Redgrave as Harry Summers
- David Dixon as Detective Inspector Ransome
- Kate Buffery as Kate Moore
- Pippa Guard as Elizabeth Ferrer
- Melanie Hill as Angie Norman
- Holly Aird as Sarah Ellis
- Sean McGinley as Jim Caine
- Adjoa Andoh as Daniela
- Joe Montana as Travis
- Peter Birch as Stefan

Kalon

- Simon Cadell as Brendan Rylands
- Saskia Wickham as Liz Baker
- John Hannah as Jason Sturden
- Struan Rodger as Alec Dwyer
- Sean Gilder as Tarleton
- John Hartley as Francis
- Constantine Gregory as Paric
- Jack Klaff as Osuna
- Tony Armatrading as Lawrence

== Episodes ==
=== Pilot (1993) ===
No. overall	No. in series	Title	Directed by	Written by	Original release date
1	1	"The Wolves are Howling"	Geoffrey Sax	Wesley Burrowes	16 October 1993
Randal (Derek Jacobi), a Security Service (MI5) officer investigating Irish Republican Army commander Liam Macaulay (Peter Vaughan), convinces John Neil, a former SAS officer and MI5 operative, to go undercover in Belfast to infiltrate the Macaulay family and disrupt their planned terrorism operation. Suspicions about his true identity begin to mount, and with Macaulay's right hand man watching his every move, Neil realises that he must complete his investigation before his cover is blown.

=== Series (1995—1996) ===
No. overall	No. in series	Title	Directed by	Written by	Original release date
2	1	"Sleeping Dogs"	Alan Grint	Story by : Jill Arlon; Screenplay by : John Brown	23 December 1995
Neil is asked to meet with retired KGB officer Alexander Petrov (Leo McKern), who has approached MI5 claiming that he has highly classified information that he wishes to sell to pay for a triple heart bypass. Petrov refuses to give in easily, but provides Neil with the names of two sleeper agents, Annie Shepherd (Frances Barber) and Bill Roper (Bill Armstrong) as an 'introductory offer'. While Neil sets about tracking down Shepherd and Roper, Petrov is murdered and Roper is later found dead having suffered a broken neck. Whilst trying to protect Annie, Neil finds he has become the target of a German hitman, Hans Schroder (Nicholas Jones), who believes him to have been responsible for Petrov's death. With Schroder's help, Neil's investigation leads him to uncover that two rogue members of the IRA are trying to recruit members of Petrov's former cell to carry out a targeted attack on a summit being attended by Soviet ministers. Although broadcast as the final episode of the series, "Sleeping Dogs" is chronologically set following the events of "The Wolves are Coming".
3	2	"Dark Secret"	Nick Laughland	Story by : Jill Arlon; Screenplay by : Barry Appleton	27 December 1995
Neil is asked to monitor one of his former SAS colleagues, Jim Caine (Sean McGinley), a suspect in a safe deposit box robbery. After learning that Caine is using information from stolen documents for blackmail, MI5 deem him a threat to national security, and Neil's task is to find out who he is blackmailing. Neil uses Caine's partner Kate (Kate Buffery) as a way in, and discovers that Caine's target is Harry Summers (Corin Redgrave), an ambitious Member of Parliament with a history of run-ins with the intelligence services. Neil discovers that Summers' assistant Sarah Ellis (Holly Aird) has hired a South African hitman, Eugene Travis (Joe Montana) to eliminate anyone who discovers Summers' secret. Before Neil can investigate further, he is ordered off the case by his superiors.
4	3	"Kalon"	Peter Barber-Fleming	Story by : Jill Arlon; Screenplay by : Ray Jenkins	8 April 1996
When Major Robert Turner (Nicholas Pritchard) is shot through the head outside his army base, Neil's superiors task him to uncover who killed him and why. Neil's investigations lead him to Jason Sturden (John Hannah), assistant to crooked merchant banker Brendan Rylands (Simon Cadell), the senior partner of Cottrill's in the City of London. Neil discovers that Rylands is the mastermind of a drug-smuggling and money-laundering ring involving Japanese banker Osuna (Jack Klaff), wealthy Hungarian property developer Paric (Constantine Gregory), and a serving officer in the Royal Air Force, Alec Dwyer (Struan Rodger). Neil struggles to work out how their operation is connected to Turner's death, but his main priority soon switches to the safety of Turner's girlfriend, Liz Baker (Saskia Wickham), a serving military intelligence officer in the British Army, whose police protection has aroused the suspicions of Rylands and his associates.

== Trivia ==
When carrying a gun, Neil uses a Walther PPK.

Throughout the series, Neil’s drink of choice is a pint of Guinness.

David Dixon appeared with Dennis Waterman in an episode of the Sweeney.

Peter Vaughan appeared with Dennis Waterman in an episode of the Sweeney and in The Railwayman’s Apprentice.
