= Tom Clegg (actor) =

British actor

Tom Clegg was an English actor, who had a number of small roles in film and television during the 1950s, 1960s and 1970s. He is known for appearing in a number of Carry On films, especially Carry On Screaming!, where he played the role of Oddbod.

== Biography ==
Born in Hackney, Clegg was first a member of the Household Cavalry. From 1937 to 1943, he was a professional boxer (using the name Tommy Clegg), taking part in 14 professional contests before getting into films as a stuntman in films such as Ivanhoe (1952).

His size and tough guy persona led to film roles, including The Flanagan Boy (1953), The Fake (1953), John of the Fair (1954), The Stateless Man (1955), The Extra Day (1956), Moby Dick (1956), The Hideout (1956), Saint Joan (1957), Battle of the V-1 (1958), Mark of the Phoenix (1958), This Sporting Life (1963) and Thunderball (1965).

He was also cast as a number of toughs and henchmen on television, including supporting turns in Quatermass II, Sword of Freedom, The Four Just Men, Dixon of Dock Green, Adam Adamant Lives!, The Saint and The Sweeney.

His appearances in comedy series include Hancock's Half Hour (The Cold, Football Pools, The Big Night and The Two Murderers), The Benny Hill Show, Corrigan Blake, and Till Death Us Do Part. Comedic film roles include Raising the Wind (1961), Decline and Fall... of a Birdwatcher, and Great Catherine (both 1968).

Clegg's comedy roles led him to become a semi-regular in the Carry On films, appearing in Carry On Regardless (1961), Carry On Spying (1964), Carry On Cleo (1964), Carry On Cowboy (1965) and Carry On Loving (1970). In the horror spoof Carry On Screaming (1966), he played the lumbering half-Frankenstein monster, half-werewolf Oddbod.

== Filmography ==
Year	Title	Role	Notes
1953	The Flanagan Boy	Tattooed Fighter	Uncredited
1953	Street of Shadows	Removal man	Uncredited
1953	The Fake	Thug	Uncredited
1954	John of the Fair	Valdar	
1954	Dangerous Cargo	Thug	Uncredited
1955	One Way Out	Thief at garage	Uncredited
1955	Scotland Yard (The Stateless Man)	Fenton	
1956	The Extra Day	Slasher Smales	
1956	The Hideout	Vince	
1956	Moby Dick	Tashtego	Uncredited
1956	Zarak	Mahmud	Uncredited
1956	The Hideout	Vince	
1958	Battle of the V-1	Anton	
1958	Mark of the Phoenix	Strong Man	
1961	Carry On Regardless	Massive Mickey McGee	
1961	Raising the Wind	Street Musician	
1961	Offbeat	Dropkick	
1963	This Sporting Life	Gower	
1964	Carry On Spying	Doorman	
1964	Carry On Cleo	Sosages	
1965	Carry On Cowboy	Blacksmith	
1965	Thunderball	Largo henchman	Uncredited
1966	Carry On Screaming	Oddbod	
1968	Decline and Fall... of a Birdwatcher	Fourth Warder	
1968	Great Catherine	Mongol	Uncredited
1968	The Fiction Makers	Monk	
1970	Carry On Loving	Trainer	(final film role)
