= Derren Nesbitt =

British actor (born 1935)

- Born: Derren Michael Horwitz; 19 June 1935 (age 91); London, England, U.K.
- Education: Royal Academy of Dramatic Art
- Occupation: Actor
- Years active: 1956–present
- Spouse(s): Anne Aubrey (m. 1961; div. 1973) Susan Parr (m. 1976, divorced) Miranda Nesbitt
- Children: 5

Derren Nesbitt (born Derren Michael Horwitz; 19 June 1935) is a British actor. Nesbitt's film career began in the late 1950s, and he appeared in many British television series throughout the 1960s and 1970s. He is best known for his role as Major von Hapen in the 1968 film Where Eagles Dare.

== Acting career ==
Nesbitt's television appearances began in the 1950s, playing numerous different roles in series such as The Adventures of Sir Lancelot and The Adventures of William Tell; he was often billed as Derry Nesbitt at this stage of his career. He went on to play the villain in a number of well-known TV series of the 60s and 70s, including Danger Man, The Saint, Doctor Who, The Prisoner, Gideon's Way, Man in a Suitcase, UFO and The Persuaders!. In 1969 he took on the role of DCI Jordan in the police drama Special Branch.

Nesbitt has also appeared in film roles such as a predatory blackmailer of gay men in Victim (1961), a murderous pimp in The Informers (1963), a slimy assassin in Nobody Runs Forever, and the suspicious Gestapo officer in Where Eagles Dare (1968). Nesbitt was keen to be as authentic as possible with his character in Where Eagles Dare. Whilst on location, he requested to meet a former member of the Gestapo to better understand how to play the character and to get the military regalia correct. He was injured on set whilst filming the scene in which his character is killed. The blood squib attached to Nesbitt exploded with such force that he was temporarily blinded, though he made a quick recovery. He also had leading roles in classic early sixties 'B' Movies The Man in the Back Seat and Strongroom, both directed by Vernon Sewell.

In 2018, Nesbitt played the leading role, as a drag queen, in a British independent film, Tucked.

== Writer and producer ==
Nesbitt wrote, produced and directed The Amorous Milkman, a 1975 British sex comedy film, starring Julie Ege, Diana Dors and Brendan Price. It was based on his 1973 novel of the same name.

== Personal life ==
Nesbitt has been married four times and has five children.

In 1961, he married the actress Anne Aubrey; the couple had a daughter the next year. On 25 January 1973, he was fined £250 when he pleaded guilty to two charges of assault occasioning actual bodily harm in October the previous year. He attacked her with a leather strap after she told him that she was having an affair with another man. He also bruised her by grabbing her clothing the next day when she refused to tell him details about her lover. She divorced him a few months later.

His third wife was an Australian beauty queen, and for a time he moved to her country where he taught theatre studies at the Northern Rivers Conservatorium of Arts in the New South Wales city of Lismore. By 2014, he was living in Worthing, West Sussex, with his fourth wife, Miranda.

He is Jewish.

== Filmography ==
=== Film ===
Year	Title	Role	Notes
1958	The Silent Enemy	Officer in charge of security patrol boat	uncredited
1958	A Night to Remember	Stoker	uncredited
1959	Room at the Top	Thug	
1959	Life in Danger	The Man	
1959	Behemoth, the Sea Monster	Radio Officer	uncredited
1960	In the Nick	Mick	
1960	Sword of Sherwood Forest	Martin of Eastwood	uncredited
1961	The Man in the Back Seat	Tony	
1961	Victim	Sandy Youth	
1961	Karolina Rijecka	Unknown	
1962	Strongroom	Griff	
1962	Term of Trial	Lodger	
1962	Kill or Cure	Roger Forrester	
1963	The Informers	Bertie Hoyle	
1965	The Amorous Adventures of Moll Flanders	Younger Brother	
1966	The Blue Max	Fabian	
1966	Operation Third Form	Skinner	
1967	The Naked Runner	Colonel Hartmann	
1968	Nobody Runs Forever	Pallain	
1968	Where Eagles Dare	Major von Hapen	
1969	Monte Carlo or Bust!	Waleska	
1972	Burke & Hare	Burke	
1972	Innocent Bystanders	Andrew Royce	
1972	Ooh... You Are Awful	Sid Sabbath	
1973	Not Now Darling	Harry McMichael	
1974	Invasion: UFO	Craig Collins	Edited from UFO (TV series)
1975	The Amorous Milkman	Replacement Milkman	uncredited. Writer, Director, Producer
1976	Spy Story	Colonel Stok	
1978	The Playbirds	Jeremy	
1978	Give Us Tomorrow	Ron	
1981	The Guns and the Fury	Captain Noel	
1983	Funny Money	Jake Sanderson	
1987	Eat the Rich	Manager	
1990	Bullseye!	Inspector Grosse	
1990	Fatal Sky	Arthur Corbin	
1992	Double X: The Name of the Game	The Minister	
2006	Pu-239	Pepsi	uncredited
2007	Flawless	Sinclair	
2011	The Hot Potato	Fritz Meyer	
2012	Run For Your Wife	Man on Bus	
2014	Home for Christmas	Grandad	
2018	Tucked	Jackie	
2020	The Haunting of Margam Castle	Hugh Morgan	

=== Television ===
Year	Title	Role	Notes
1956- 1957	The Adventures of Sir Lancelot	Sir Tristam Various other roles	Season 1: (14 episodes)
1957	Sword of Freedom	Di Lucca	Season 1, episode 32: "The Marionettes"
1957 1961	Armchair Theatre	Otto Geoffrey Fitton	Season 2, episode 5: "The Pier" Season 4, episode 21: "Honeymoon Postponed"
1958- 1959	The Adventures of William Tell	Captain Frederick Various other roles	Season 1: (8 episodes)
1959	The Larkins	Spider	Season 2, episode 2: "Teddy for Eddie"
1959	The Invisible Man	Corporal Stephan	Season 1, episode 2: "Crisis in the Desert" Season 2, episode 1: "Point of Destruction"
1959	ITV Television Playhouse	Tod Blake	Season 5, episode 6: "The Blood Fight"
1959	Probation Officer	Joe	Season 1, episode 6
1960	Skyport	Phillipe	Season 1, episode 44
1960	Theatre 70	Unknown	Season 1, episode 10: "The Neighbour"
1960 1961	Danger Man	Hans Vogeler Hugo Morelli	Season 1: (2 episodes)
1961	International Detective	Istvan Martos	Season 1, episode 27: "The Martos Case"
1962	Man of the World	Polikoff	Season 1, episode 11: "Specialist for the Kill"
1963	Dixon of Dock Green	Brian Thomas	Season 9, episode 26: "A Woman Named Julie"
1963	Emergency-Ward 10	Campbell Goffin	Season 1: (8 episodes)
1963	Taxi!	Lennie Marsh	Season 1, episode 7: "A Long Way to Go"
1963	The Sentimental Agent	Lewis	Season 1, episode 6: "Meet My Son, Henry"
1963	The Saint	Netchideff	Season 2, episode 13: "The Sporting Chance"
1964	No Hiding Place	Wilf Barret	Season 6, episode 6: "The Write-off"
1964	Doctor Who	Tegana	Season 1: Marco Polo (7 episodes)
1964	The Protectors	Stodgey Payne	Season 1, episode 5: "The Loop Men"
1964 1965 1966	ITV Play of the Week	Caiser Harry Ricky	Season 10: (2 episodes) Season 11, episode 35: "The Move After Checkmate"
1965	Public Eye	Kiley	Season 1, episode 11: "Protection Is a Man's Best Friend"
1965	Gideon's Way	John Benson	Season 1, episode 14: "The Tin God"
1965	Danger Man	Rachid Noureddine	Season 2, episode 4: "Sting in the Tail"
1967	The Rat Catchers	Charles Dinley	Season 2: (2 episodes)
1967	Mr. Rose	Fred Chater	Season 1, episode 10: "The Deadly Doll"
1967	Write a Play	Unknown	Season 2, episode 8: "The White Christ & The Freeze Man"
1967	Softly, Softly	Newnes	Season 3: (2 episodes)
1967	The Troubleshooters	Lanyon	Season 4, episode 7: "And the Walls Came Tumbling Down"
1967	Man in a Suitcase	Lucas Guardino	Season 1, episode 11: "Dead Man's Shoes"
1967	The Prisoner	New Number Two	Season 1, episode 10: "It's Your Funeral"
1969	Honey Lane	Al Dowman	Unknown
1969- 1970	Special Branch	Detective Chief Inspector Jordan	Season 1: (14 episodes) Season 2: (13 episodes)
1970	Strange Report	Nils Paavo	Season 1, episode 16: "Report 4977: Swindle – Square Root of Evil"
1970	Berlin Affair	Galt	TV movie
1971	UFO	Colonel Craig Collins	Season 1, episode 16: "The Man Who Came Back"
1971	The Persuaders!	Groski	Season 1, episode 9: "The Old, the New and the Deadly"
1972 1973	The Protectors	Brad Huron Colin Foster	Season 1: (2 episodes)
1979	Return of the Saint	Inspector Lebec	Season 1: (2 episodes: "Collision Course Part I: The Brave Goose" and "Collision Course Part II: The Sixth Man")
1979	The House on Garibaldi Street	Arthur Lubinsky	TV movie
1980	Sherlock Holmes and Doctor Watson	George Wharton	Season 1, episode 20: "The Case of the Luckless Gambler"
1982	The Chinese Detective	Gunther Esslin	Season 2, episode 6: "Chorale"
1988 1990 1993	The Comic Strip Presents...	Various characters	Season 4, episode 1: "The Strike" Season 5: (2 episodes) Season 7, episode 2: "Space Virgins from Planet Sex"
1990	Bergerac	Dennis Swain	Season 8, episode 2: "My Name's Sergeant Bergerac"
1993	Hale and Pace	Unknown	Season 5, episode 6
2004	The Courtroom	Judge Arnold Francis	Season 1: (11 episodes)
2025	The Prisoner of Portmeirion: Our Lives	Himself	
