= Guido Coen =

Italian-British film producer (1915–2010)

Guido Coen (1915–2010) was an Italian-born British film producer and film subtitler. He and his family were interned in Douglas, Isle of Man during the Second World War. He began his career working for Filippo Del Giudice and Two Cities Films. When Two Cities was absorbed into the Rank Organisation in the mid-1940s Coen was employed by David Cunynghame (full name: Sir Henry David St Leger Brooke Selwyn Cunynghame, 11th Baronet Cunynghame; 1905–1978) of London Film Productions as a subtitler. As Coen later described it in an interview, he did not know anything about subtitling at the time, and learned on the job:

I finally got a phone call from London Films, Sir Cunnyngham, that 's it, who asked me whether I had ever subtitles pictures. I immediately said I had when in point of fact I did not know what he meant, and there was a young man in the office with Sir David Cunnynghame called Lew Watt, and he said Lew Watt will do the technical side and we want you to subtitle an Italian picture in to English. I said certainly. I came out of his office and Lew Watt said to me you don't know what they're talking about do you? I said you're quite right, he said well I'll show you. And I started subtitling pictures with Lew Watt, I used to do the literary side, and he used to do the technical side, the spotting, and lengths, and we together did subtitles for 40 or 50 pictures. The funny thing was we subtitled pictures in Chinese, in Indian and for the Chinese picture I had to have a Chinese waiter with me to tell me where the subtitles [...] I had the Italian dialogue and I had the picture, they gave me a film and we did the spotting together with Lew Watt and the measurements and I used to type the script. We had the film, we had the print which used to run on the two sided thing. And Lew Watt was working all the day so we had to do this at night, so we either used to work at night till 2 o'clock in the morning or we used to work at the weekends. There was always the problem that the Movieola might break down and so we had spare keys of other cutting rooms in in elm St in case we were caught. And that was how we started.

Coen later founded his own company Kenilworth Film Productions and spent most of the post-war years producing second features. He made a dozen films in partnership with the director Charles Saunders. He later produced the 1971 horror film Burke & Hare, based on the Burke and Hare murders, and the comedies Au Pair Girls and Intimate Games.

== Selected filmography ==
- She Shall Have Murder (1950)
- La peccatrice dell'isola (1952) (English subtitles)
- Meet Mr. Callaghan (1954)
- Behind the Headlines (1956)
- The Man Without a Body (1957)
- There's Always a Thursday (1957)
- Kill Her Gently (1957)
- Naked Fury (1959)
- Jungle Street (1960)
- Operation Cupid (1960)
- Dangerous Afternoon (1961)
- Panic (1963)
- The Penthouse (1967)
- Baby Love (1968)
- One Brief Summer (1970)
- Burke & Hare (1971)
- Au Pair Girls (1972)
- Intimate Games (1976)

== Bibliography ==
- Chibnall, Steve & McFarlane, Brian. The British 'B' Film. Palgrave Macmillan, 2009.
