= Come Back Peter (1969 film) =

British film by Donovan Winter

- Film poster
- Directed by: Donovan Winter
- Written by: Donovan Winter
- Produced by: Donovan Winter
- Starring: Christopher Matthews
- Cinematography: Gus Coma; Ian D. Struthers
- Edited by: Donovan Winter
- Production company: Donwin Productions
- Distributed by: Richard Schulman Entertainments
- Release date: 1969
- Running time: 65 minutes
- Country: United Kingdom
- Language: English

Come Back Peter is a 1969 British sex comedy film written, produced, edited and directed by Donovan Winter and starring Christopher Matthews. It was reissued in the UK with additional footage in 1976 under the title Some Like It Sexy.

== Plot ==
Peter, a young Londoner, drives around town in a Jaguar E-Type, delivering wrapped gifts to various women with whom he has sexual encounters: a foreign au pair, a model, a high-class lady, incestuous twins, a blues singer, a cannabis-smoking hippie, and a girl next door from The Salvation Army. At the end of the film, Peter is revealed to be a butcher's delivery boy having sexual fantasies while driving his van. The butcher scolds Peter for daydreaming on the job.

== Cast ==
- Christopher Matthews as Peter
- Erika Bergmann as Lisa (the au pair)
- Penny Riley as Sue (the model)
- Yolande Turner as Mrs Beaufort-Smith
- Madeline Smith as Mrs Beaufort-Smith's daughter
- Valerie St. Helene as Cleo (the singer)
- Annabel Leventon as Creampuff (the hippie)
- Nicola Pagett as Jenny (the salvationist)
- Madeleine and Mary Collinson as the twins

== Critical response ==
Kine Weekly wrote: "The film is brightly dressed in the modern manner and the general unreal atmosphere of the plot is explained by the fantasy revelation at the end. The young man's adventures are with a variety of young women, but the sex is, of necessity, somewhat repetitious and the direction includes some annoyingly distracting technical gimmicks."

In The Monthly Film Bulletin Nigel Andrews wrote: "A charmless and flashy film which attempts to combine customary sex fare with evocations of Swinging London and a colourful cross-section of modern womanhood. But for all Donovan Winter's attempts to vary the menu, the appetite is soon cloyed by the monotony of the presentation. Each encounter is punctuated with a symbolic shot of a butcher cutting up meat; the dialogue is card-indexed according to social type ("Turn me on! Freak me out, man!" croons the hippie); and Christopher Matthews' change of wardrobe for each bird fails to alleviate the vulgar tedium of his adventures."

Variety said: "The picture which, at least, is short, really adds up to very little but may have a basic appeal to "swingers" and young Lotharios will roving eyes for birds."

The film was negatively received by Derek Malcolm of The Guardian and Nina Hibbin of the Morning Star.
