= The Man in the Back Seat =

1961 British film by Vernon Sewell

- Theatrical release poster
- Directed by: Vernon Sewell
- Written by: Malcolm Hulke; Eric Paice; Edgar Wallace (story)
- Produced by: Leslie Parkyn; Julian Wintle
- Starring: Derren Nesbitt; Keith Faulkner
- Cinematography: Reginald Wyer
- Edited by: John Trumper
- Music by: Stanley Black
- Production company: Independent Artists Studios
- Distributed by: Anglo-Amalgamated
- Release date: June 1961
- Running time: 57 minutes
- Country: United Kingdom
- Language: English

The Man in the Back Seat is a 1961 British second feature crime film, directed by Vernon Sewell and starring Derren Nesbitt and Keith Faulkner. It was written by Malcolm Hulke and Eric Paice based on an Edgar Wallace story.

== Plot ==
Cold and vicious Tony and his more pleasant-natured but easily influenced partner-in-crime Frank hatch a plan to rob bookmaker Joe Carter of his takings as he leaves the local dog track. They attack him brutally, then realise that the case containing the cash is chained to Joe's wrist. They bundle him unconscious into the back seat of his car and they drive around trying to figure out a way to release the case. They come up with various possible solutions, but nothing works and they end up at Frank's flat, to the horror of Frank's wife Jean, who does not want their criminal activities to be brought to her doorstep.

They manage to free the case after Tony administers another severe beating to Joe, and decide to get rid of him by dousing him in alcohol and dumping him near the local hospital, where they assume a passer-by will find him and think he has suffered a drunken fall. Later, Frank realises that Tony has left his fingerprints on the whisky bottle, so they have no option but to return to the crime scene to retrieve it. Again they are disturbed, so they take Joe back to Tony's flat and contact a former male nurse who, after looking at Joe a while, says he is dying. As a last resort, Tony and Frank decide to dump the body outside the dog track where the robbery took place and where there will be nothing to connect the crime to them. After Tony tricks Frank into reversing the car over Carter's still-living body upon leaving in order to blame him for the death, and exonerate himself from a capital crime, they drive through the night heading for Birmingham.

Frank then believes that they are being followed. Further, increasingly paranoic, and barely out of London, he looks in the rear view mirror, and feels the terror of seeing Carter's ghostly, glaring face, reproaching him from the back seat behind him. In total panic, Frank drives the car off the road through a barrier and off a viaduct. The crash kills Tony instantly, but Frank, seriously injured yet alive, is pulled clear by a passing police patrol. The police confirm Tony's death. As Frank lies dying, he gasps Tony's name, but the car explodes before anything more can be done.

== Cast ==
- Derren Nesbitt as Tony
- Keith Faulkner as Frank
- Carol White as Jean
- Harry Locke as Joe Carter
- Abe Barker as Charlie (uncredited)
- Anthony Bate as AA patrolman (uncredited)
- Roy Purcell as petrol station manager (uncredited)

== Production ==
Only four name-credited actors appear, one of whom, Harry Locke, remains silent through most of the film. Much of the action takes place in a cramped flat and the claustrophobic confines of a car at night.

This was the last of the twelve films of Abe Barker, who died in the year of its release (on 25 April 1961).

Sewell called it a "good picture".

== Critical reception ==
The Monthly Film Bulletin wrote: "The taut plot stays on course, unfolding for the most part on broad municipal highways and narrow back streets at night, the shadows cast by the roadside lights accentuating the macabre, especially in the Mabuse-like finale. Previously, the suspense is a shade overstretched: as the two boys cruise around in their victim's car trying to rid themselves of the body in the back, some of the nerve-wracking crises – flat tyre, helpful A.A. man, inquisitive policeman – are less credible than others. Similarly, it takes a little while before the two well contrasted and acted boys crystallise into fully believable characters; and the scenes in Frank's home are weak. Vernon Sewell's direction is unambitious but gripping. On balance, the best British crime feature for some little time."

Kine Weekly wrote: "Taut Crime melodrama, presented against big city backgrounds. ... The picture, apart from the actual hold-up and a couple of sequences in Frank's home, unfolds on broad municipal highways during the night and the shadows cast by the electric lights artfully accentuate the macabre. Derren Nesbitt thoroughly convinces as the brash, brutal and callous Tony, Keith Faulkner is an effective foil as the easily led Frank, Carol White has her moments as the frightened Jean, and Harry Locke is eloquently mute as the unfortunate Carter. There are few comedy touches, but real tension and a scorching finale."

In the Radio Times, David Parkinson wrote, "The phrase 'quota quickie' was synonymous with cheaply made, under-plotted films notable only for the ineptitude of the acting. It's a rare treat, therefore, to stumble across a British B with an intriguing idea that's been ingeniously executed. Director Vernon Sewell, who was responsible for some of the very worst quickies, outdoes himself with this haunting story."

Leslie Halliwell said: "Taut, downbeat little crime thriller which won a few critical plaudits."
