= The Corn Is Green (disambiguation) =

The Corn Is Green is a play by Emlyn Williams.

The Corn Is Green may also refer to two film adaptations:

- The Corn Is Green (1945 film), starring Bette Davis
- The Corn Is Green (1979 film), a television adaptation starring Katharine Hepburn
