= Beryl Nesbitt =

English actress (1927–2024)

Beryl Nesbitt (June 1927 – April 2024) was an English actress and model with numerous roles in major films, television dramas and theatre productions spanning from the mid-1950s through to 2017.

== Life and career ==
Nesbitt was born in Liverpool in June 1927. She gained public recognition for her role as the housekeeper Annie Hughes in the 1983 TV series The Citadel and as Simone in the 1986 series Bluebell. She worked alongside Richard Beckinsale as part of the cast on the comedy series Bloomers, which was incomplete before he died. Of later years she has had a starring role in the Notting Hill Anxiety Festival and appeared as Mikey's nan in Doghouse as well as being the prominent face on Amstel Lager posters. She played a screaming prisoner in the episode The Way Back of Blake's 7.

Nesbitt died in April 2024, at the age of 96.
