= George Cukor =

American film director and producer (1899–1983)

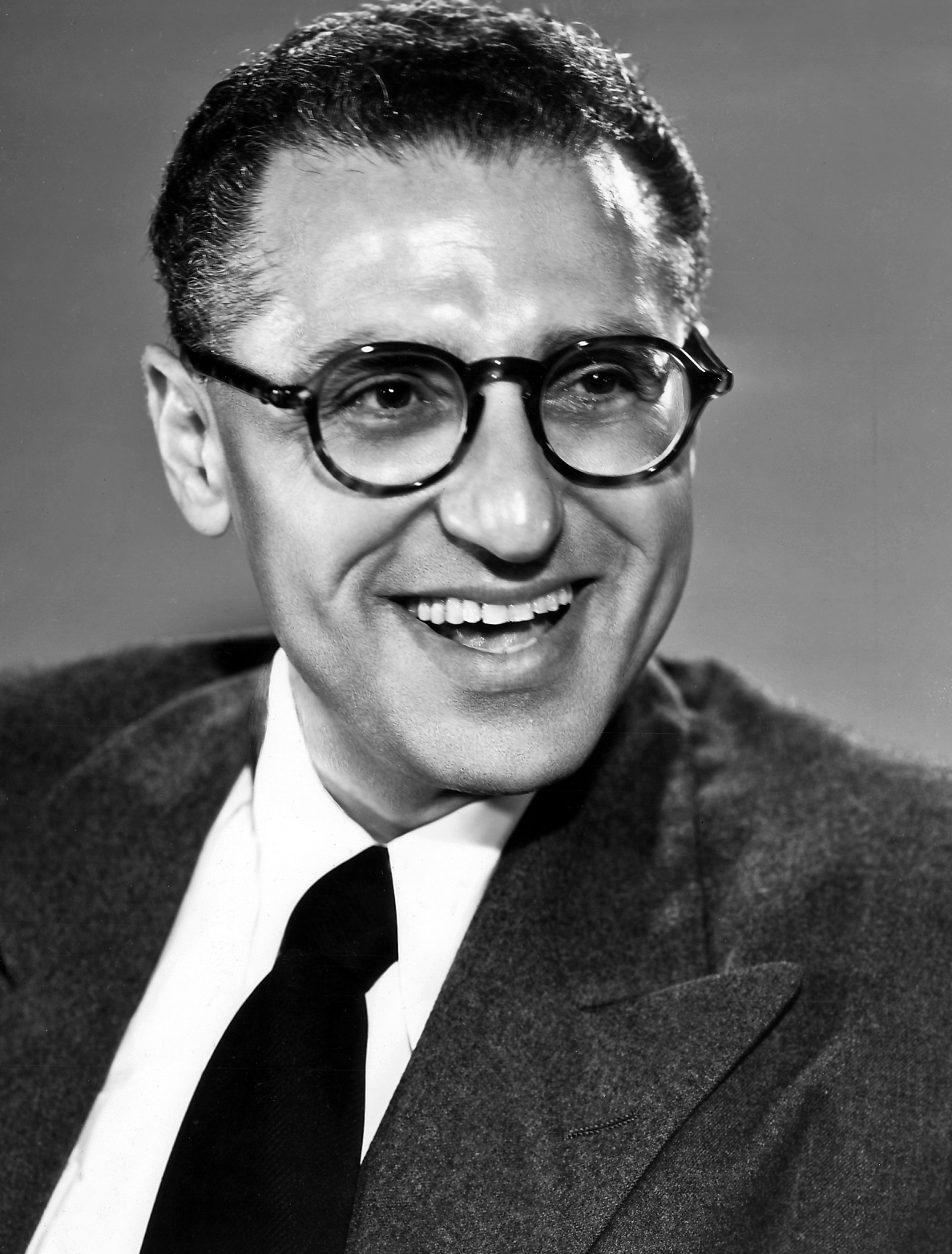
- Cukor in 1946
- Born: George Dewey Cukor; July 7, 1899; New York City, U.S.
- Died: January 24, 1983 (aged 83); Los Angeles, California, U.S.
- Resting place: Forest Lawn Memorial Park (Glendale)
- Occupations: Film director; producer
- Years active: 1930–1981
- Awards: Academy Award for Best Director; 1965 My Fair Lady; Golden Globe Award for Best Director; 1965 My Fair Lady

George Dewey Cukor (/ˈkjuːkɔːr/ KEW-kor; July 7, 1899 – January 24, 1983) was an American film director and producer. He concentrated primarily on comedies and literary adaptations. His career flourished at RKO when David O. Selznick, the studio's head of production, assigned Cukor to direct several of RKO's major films, including What Price Hollywood? (1932), A Bill of Divorcement (1932), Our Betters (1933), and Little Women (1933). When Selznick moved to Metro-Goldwyn-Mayer in 1933, Cukor followed and directed Dinner at Eight (1933) and David Copperfield (1935) for Selznick, and Romeo and Juliet (1936) and Camille (1936) for Irving Thalberg.

He was replaced as one of the directors of Gone with the Wind (1939), but he went on to direct The Philadelphia Story (1940), Gaslight (1944), Adam's Rib (1949), Born Yesterday (1950), A Star Is Born (1954), and Bhowani Junction (1956), and won the Academy Award, the British Academy Film Award, and the Golden Globe Award for directing My Fair Lady (1964). In 1975, Cukor won the Primetime Emmy Award for Outstanding Directing in a Special Program - Drama or Comedy for Love Among the Ruins. He continued to work into the early 1980s.

== Early life ==
Cukor was born on the Lower East Side of Manhattan, the younger child and only son of Hungarian-Jewish immigrants Viktor, an assistant district attorney, and Helén Ilona Gross. His parents selected his first and middle name in honor of the Spanish–American War hero George Dewey. The family was not particularly religious, with pork a staple on the dinner table, and when he started attending temple as a boy, Cukor learned Hebrew phonetically, with no real understanding of the meaning of the words or what they represented. As a result, he was ambivalent about his faith and dismissive of old world traditions from childhood, and as an adult he embraced Anglophilia to remove himself even further from his roots.

As a child, Cukor appeared in several amateur plays and took dance lessons, and at the age of seven he performed in a recital with David O. Selznick, who in later years became a mentor and friend. As a teenager, Cukor frequently was taken to the New York Hippodrome by his uncle. Infatuated with theatre, he often cut classes at DeWitt Clinton High School to attend afternoon matinees. During his senior year, he worked as a supernumerary with the Metropolitan Opera, earning 50¢ per appearance, and $1 if he was required to perform in blackface.

Following his graduation in 1917, Cukor was expected to follow in his father's footsteps and pursue a career in law. He halfheartedly enrolled in the City College of New York, where he entered the Students Army Training Corps in October 1918. His military experience was limited; Germany surrendered in early November, and Cukor's duty ended after only two months. He left school shortly afterwards.

== Career ==
=== Early stage career ===
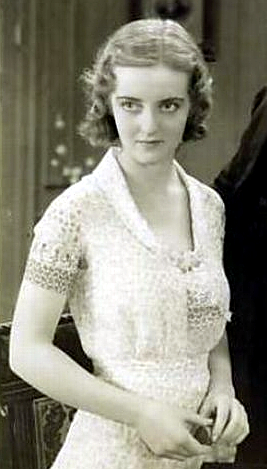
Bette Davis, aged 23

Cukor obtained a job as an assistant stage manager and bit player with a touring production of The Better 'Ole, a popular British musical based on Old Bill, a cartoon character created by Bruce Bairnsfather. In 1920, he became the stage manager for the Knickerbocker Players, a troupe that shuttled between Syracuse, New York and Rochester, New York, and the following year he was hired as general manager of the newly formed Lyceum Players, an upstate summer stock company. In 1925, he formed the C.F. and Z. Production Company with Walter Folmer and John Zwicki, which gave him his first opportunity to direct. Following their first season, he made his Broadway directorial debut with Antonia by Hungarian playwright Melchior Lengyel, then returned to Rochester, where C.F. and Z. evolved into the Cukor-Kondolf Stock Company, a troupe that included Louis Calhern, Ilka Chase, Phyllis Povah, Frank Morgan, Reginald Owen, Elizabeth Patterson and Douglass Montgomery, all of whom worked with Cukor in later years in Hollywood. Lasting only one season with the company was Bette Davis. Cukor later recalled: "Her talent was apparent, but she did buck at direction. She had her own ideas, and though she only did bits and ingenue roles, she didn't hesitate to express them." For the next several decades, Davis claimed she was fired, and although Cukor never understood why she placed so much importance on an incident he considered so minor, he never worked with her again.

For the next few years, Cukor alternated between Rochester in the summer months and Broadway in the winter. His direction of a 1926 stage adaptation of The Great Gatsby by Owen Davis brought him to the attention of the New York critics. Writing in the Brooklyn Eagle, drama critic Arthur Pollock called it "an unusual piece of work by a director not nearly so well known as he should be." Cukor directed six more Broadway productions, then departed for Hollywood in 1929.

=== Early Hollywood career ===
When Hollywood began to recruit New York theater talent for sound films, Cukor immediately answered the call. In December 1928, Paramount Pictures signed him to a contract that reimbursed him for his train fare and initially paid him $600 per week with no screen credit during a six-month apprenticeship. He arrived in Hollywood in February 1929, and his first assignment was to coach the cast of River of Romance to speak with an acceptable Southern accent. In October, the studio lent him to Universal Pictures to conduct the screen tests and work as a dialogue director for All Quiet on the Western Front, released in 1930. That year, he co-directed three films at Paramount, and his weekly salary was increased to $1,500. He made his solo directorial debut with Tarnished Lady (1931) starring Tallulah Bankhead.

Cukor was then assigned to One Hour with You (1932), an operetta with Maurice Chevalier and Jeanette MacDonald, when original director Ernst Lubitsch opted to concentrate on producing the film instead. At first the two men worked well together, but two weeks into filming Lubitsch began arriving on the set on a regular basis, and he soon began directing scenes with Cukor's consent. Upon the film's completion, Lubitsch approached Paramount general manager B.P. Schulberg and threatened to leave the studio if Cukor's name wasn't removed from the credits. When Schulberg asked him to cooperate, Cukor filed suit. He eventually settled for being billed as assistant director and then left Paramount to work with David O. Selznick at RKO Studios.

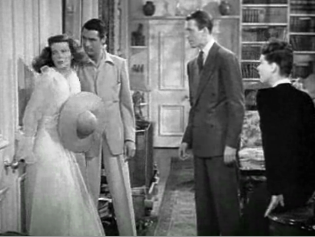
Scene from Cukor's hit film The Philadelphia Story

Cukor quickly earned a reputation as a director who could coax great performances from actresses and he became known as a "woman's director", a title he resented. Despite this reputation, during his career, he oversaw more performances honored with the Academy Award for Best Actor than any other director: James Stewart in The Philadelphia Story (1940), Ronald Colman in A Double Life (1947), and Rex Harrison in My Fair Lady (1964). One of Cukor's earlier ingenues was actress Katharine Hepburn, who debuted in A Bill of Divorcement (1932) and whose looks and personality left RKO officials at a loss as to how to use her. Cukor directed her in several films, both successful, such as Little Women (1933) and The Philadelphia Story (1940), and disastrous, such as Sylvia Scarlett (1935). Cukor and Hepburn became close friends off the set.

Cukor was hired to direct Gone with the Wind by Selznick in 1936, even before the book was published. He spent the next two years involved with pre-production, including supervision of the numerous screen tests of actresses anxious to portray Scarlett O'Hara. Cukor favored Hepburn for the role, but Selznick, concerned about her reputation as "box office poison", would not consider her without a screen test, and the actress refused to film one. Of those who did, Cukor preferred Paulette Goddard, but her supposedly illicit relationship with Charlie Chaplin (they were, in fact, secretly married) concerned Selznick.

Between his Wind chores, the director assisted with other projects. He filmed the cave scene for The Adventures of Tom Sawyer (1938), and, following the firing of its original director Richard Thorpe, Cukor spent a week on the set of The Wizard of Oz (1939). Although he filmed no footage, he made crucial changes to the look of Dorothy by eliminating Judy Garland's blonde wig and adjusting her makeup and costume, encouraging her to act in a more natural manner. Additionally, Cukor softened the Scarecrow's makeup and gave Margaret Hamilton a different hairstyle for the Wicked Witch of the West, as well as altering her makeup and other facial features. Cukor also suggested that the studio cast Jack Haley, on loan from 20th Century Fox, as the Tin Man.

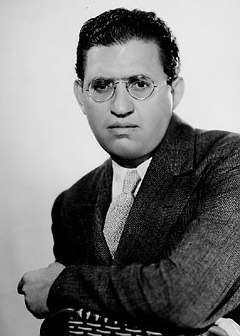
David O. Selznick

Cukor spent many hours coaching Vivien Leigh and Olivia de Havilland before the start of filming Wind, but Clark Gable resisted his efforts to get him to master a Southern accent. However, despite rumors about Gable being uncomfortable with Cukor on the set, nothing in the internal memos of David O. Selznick indicates or suggests that Clark Gable had anything to do with Cukor's dismissal from the film. Rather, they show Selznick's mounting dissatisfaction with Cukor's slow pace and quality of work. From a private letter from journalist Susan Myrick to Margaret Mitchell in February 1939: "George [Cukor] finally told me all about it. He hated [leaving the production] very much he said but he could not do otherwise. In effect he said he is an honest craftsman and he cannot do a job unless he knows it is a good job and he feels the present job is not right. For days, he told me he has looked at the rushes and felt he was failing...the things did not click as it should. Gradually he became convinced that the script was the trouble...So George just told David he would not work any longer if the script was not better and he wanted the [Sidney] Howard script back...he would not let his name go out over a lousy picture...and bull-headed David said 'OK get out!'"

Selznick had already been unhappy with Cukor ("a very expensive luxury") for not being more receptive to directing other Selznick assignments, even though Cukor had remained on salary since early 1937; and in a confidential memo written in September 1938, four months before principal photography began, Selznick flirted with the idea of replacing him with Victor Fleming. "I think the biggest black mark against our management to date is the Cukor situation and we can no longer be sentimental about it...We are a business concern and not patrons of the arts." Cukor was relieved of his duties, but he continued to work with Leigh and Olivia de Havilland off the set. Various rumors about the reasons behind his dismissal circulated throughout Hollywood. Selznick's friendship with Cukor had crumbled slightly when the director refused other assignments, including A Star Is Born (1937) and Intermezzo (1939). Given that Gable and Cukor had worked together before (on Manhattan Melodrama, 1934) and Gable had no objection to working with him then, and given Selznick's desperation to get Gable for Rhett Butler, if Gable had any objections to Cukor, certainly they would have been expressed before he signed his contract for the film. Yet, writer Gore Vidal, in his autobiography Point to Point Navigation, recounted that Gable demanded that Cukor be fired off Wind because, according to Vidal, the young Gable had been a male hustler and Cukor had been one of his johns. This has been confirmed by Hollywood biographer E.J. Fleming, who has recounted that, during a particularly difficult scene, Gable erupted publicly, screaming: "I can't go on with this picture. I won't be directed by a fairy. I have to work with a real man."

Cukor's dismissal from Wind freed him to direct The Women (1939), which has an all-female cast, followed by The Philadelphia Story (1940). He also directed Greta Garbo, another of his favorite actresses, in Two-Faced Woman (1941), her last film before she retired from the screen.

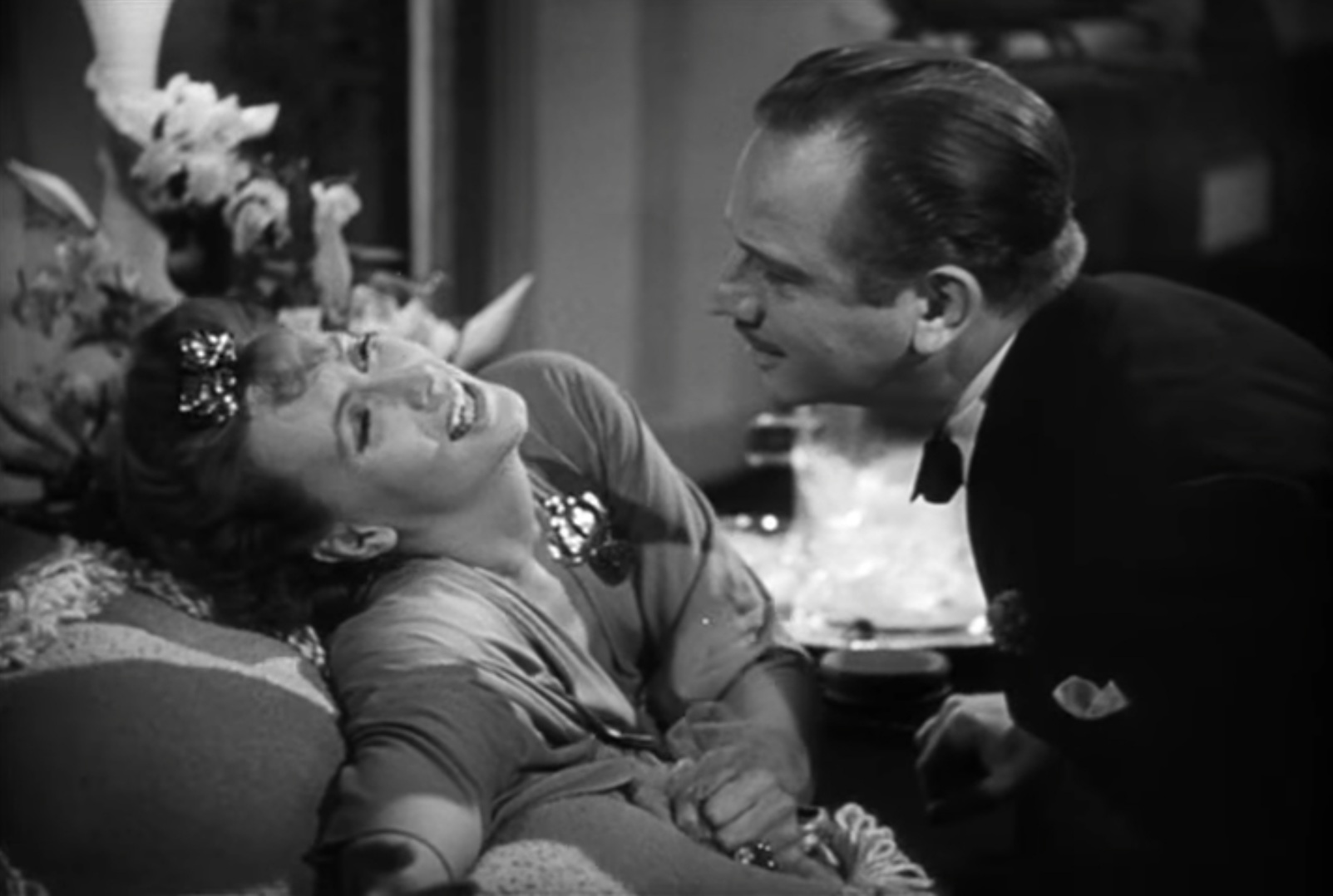
Greta Garbo and Melvyn Douglas in Two-Faced Woman (1941)

In 1942, at the age of 43, Cukor enlisted in the Signal Corps. Following basic training at Fort Monmouth, he was assigned to the old Paramount studios in Astoria, Queens (where he had directed three films in the early 1930s), although he was permitted to lodge at the St. Regis Hotel in Manhattan. Working with Irwin Shaw, John Cheever and William Saroyan, among others, Cukor produced training and instructional films for army personnel. Because he lacked an officer's commission, he found it difficult to give orders and directions to his superiors. Despite his efforts to rise above the rank of private—he even called upon Frank Capra to intercede on his behalf—he never achieved officer's status or any commendations during his six months of service. In later years, Cukor suspected his homosexuality impeded him from receiving any advances or honors, although rumors to that effect could not be confirmed.

The remainder of the decade was a series of hits and misses for Cukor. Both Two-Faced Woman and Her Cardboard Lover (1942) were commercial failures. More successful were A Woman's Face (1941) with Joan Crawford and Gaslight (1944) about a woman suffering from suspicion with Ingrid Bergman and Charles Boyer. During this era, Cukor forged an alliance with screenwriters Garson Kanin and Ruth Gordon, who had met in Cukor's home in 1939 and married three years later. Over the course of seven years, the trio collaborated on seven films, including A Double Life (1947) starring Ronald Colman, Adam's Rib (1949), Born Yesterday (1950), The Marrying Kind (1952), and It Should Happen to You (1954), all featuring Judy Holliday, another Cukor favorite, who won the Academy Award for Best Actress for Born Yesterday.

=== Later Hollywood career ===
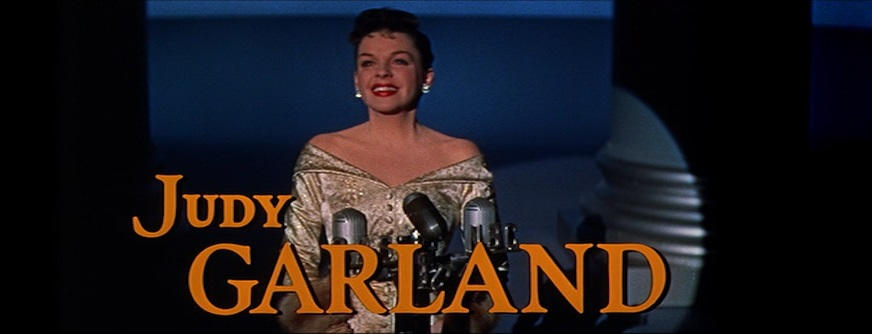
Judy Garland, star of A Star Is Born

In December 1952, Cukor was approached by Sid Luft, who proposed the director helm a musical remake of A Star Is Born (1937) with his then-wife Judy Garland in the lead role. Cukor had declined to direct the earlier film because it was too similar to his own What Price Hollywood? (1932), but the opportunity to direct his first Technicolor film and work with screenwriter Moss Hart and especially Garland appealed to him, and he accepted. Getting the updated A Star Is Born (1954) to the screen proved to be a challenge. Cukor wanted Cary Grant for the male lead and went so far as to read the entire script with him, but Grant, while agreeing it was the role of a lifetime, steadfastly refused to do it, and Cukor never forgave him. The director then suggested either Humphrey Bogart or Frank Sinatra tackle the part, but Jack L. Warner rejected both. Stewart Granger was the front runner for a period of time, but he backed out when he was unable to adjust to Cukor's habit of acting out scenes as a form of direction. James Mason eventually was contracted, and filming began on October 12, 1953. As the months passed, Cukor was forced to deal not only with constant script changes but a very unstable Garland, who was plagued by chemical and alcohol dependencies, extreme weight fluctuations, and real and imagined illnesses. In March 1954, a rough cut still missing several musical numbers was assembled, and Cukor had mixed feelings about it. When the last scene finally was filmed in the early morning hours of July 28, 1954, Cukor already had departed the production and was unwinding in Europe. The first preview the following month ran 210 minutes and, despite ecstatic feedback from the audience, Cukor and editor Folmar Blangsted trimmed it to 182 minutes for its New York premiere in October. The reviews were the best of Cukor's career, but Warner executives, concerned the running time would limit the number of daily showings, made drastic cuts without Cukor, who had departed for Pakistan to scout locations for the epic Bhowani Junction in 1954–1955. At its final running time of 154 minutes, the film had lost musical numbers and crucial dramatic scenes, and Cukor called it "very painful". He was not included in the film's six Oscar nominations.

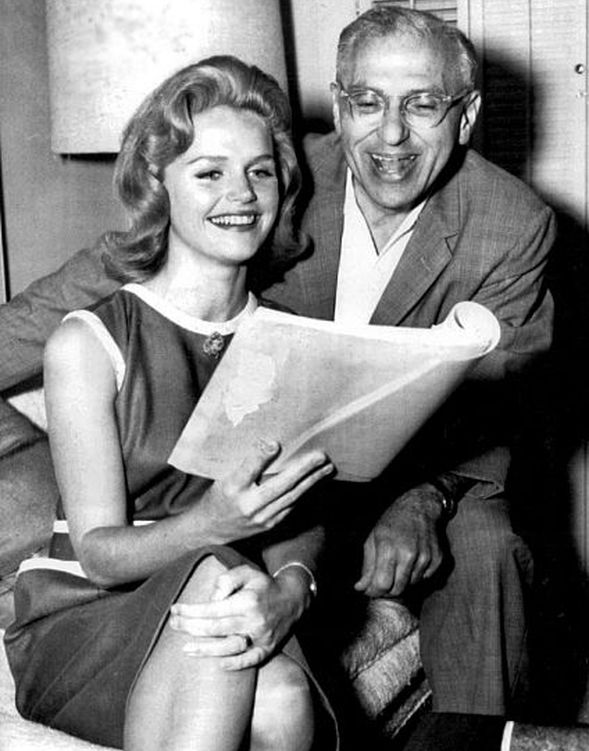
Rehearsing with Lee Remick in 1962

Over the next 10 years, Cukor directed a handful of films with varying success. Les Girls (1957) won the Golden Globe Award for Best Motion Picture – Musical or Comedy, and Wild Is the Wind (also 1957) earned Oscar nominations for Anna Magnani and Anthony Quinn, but neither Heller in Pink Tights nor Let's Make Love (both 1960) were box-office hits. Another project during this period was the ill-fated Something's Got to Give, an updated remake of the comedy My Favorite Wife (1940). Cukor liked leading lady Marilyn Monroe but found it difficult to deal with her erratic work habits, frequent absences from the set, and the constant presence of Monroe's acting coach Paula Strasberg. It was reported at the time that after 32 days of shooting, the director had only 7½ minutes of usable film. Footage would be discovered in the 1990s that showed at least 37 minutes of total footage had survived. Then Monroe travelled to New York to appear at a birthday celebration for President John F. Kennedy at Madison Square Garden, where she serenaded Kennedy. Studio documents released after Monroe's death confirmed that her appearance at the political fundraising event was approved by Fox executives. The production came to a halt when Cukor had filmed every scene not involving Monroe and the actress remained unavailable. 20th Century Fox executive Peter Levathes fired her and hired Lee Remick to replace her, prompting co-star Dean Martin to quit because his contract guaranteed he would be playing opposite Monroe. It was also reported at the time that with the production already $2 million over budget and everyone back at the starting gate, the studio pulled the plug on the project. However, Monroe successfully renegotiated her contract from $100,000 to $500,000 with a bonus should the film be completed on time. Cukor was to be replaced by Jean Negulesco. There was limited press at the time about the project restarting and even less on Cukor being replaced. When Monroe was found dead in her home in the same year of 1962, Cukor would give a high-profile interview discussing Monroe's many reported problems.

Two years later, Cukor achieved one of his greatest successes with My Fair Lady (1964). Throughout filming, there were mounting tensions between the director and designer Cecil Beaton; Cukor was thrilled with leading lady Audrey Hepburn, but the crew was less enchanted with her diva-like demands. Although several reviews were critical of the film – Pauline Kael said it "staggers along" and Stanley Kauffmann thought Cukor's direction was like "a rich gravy poured over everything, not remotely as delicately rich as in the Asquith–Howard 1937 [sic] Pygmalion"— the film was a box-office hit which won him the Academy Award for Best Director, the Golden Globe Award for Best Director, and the Directors Guild of America Award after having been nominated for each several times.

Following My Fair Lady, Cukor became less active. He directed Maggie Smith in Travels with My Aunt (1972) and helmed the critical and commercial flop The Blue Bird (1976), the first joint Soviet-American production. He reunited twice with Katharine Hepburn for the television movies Love Among the Ruins (1975) and The Corn Is Green (1979). At the age of 82, Cukor directed his final film, Rich and Famous for MGM in 1981, starring Jacqueline Bisset and Candice Bergen.

In 1970, he received the Golden Plate Award of the American Academy of Achievement.

Cukor wanted the Academy to host a film festival in Los Angeles however the plan did not materialize and Cukor ended up being co-founder of the Los Angeles International Film Exposition (Filmex) in 1970.

In 1976, Cukor was awarded the George Eastman Award, given by George Eastman House for distinguished contribution to the art of film.

== Personal life ==
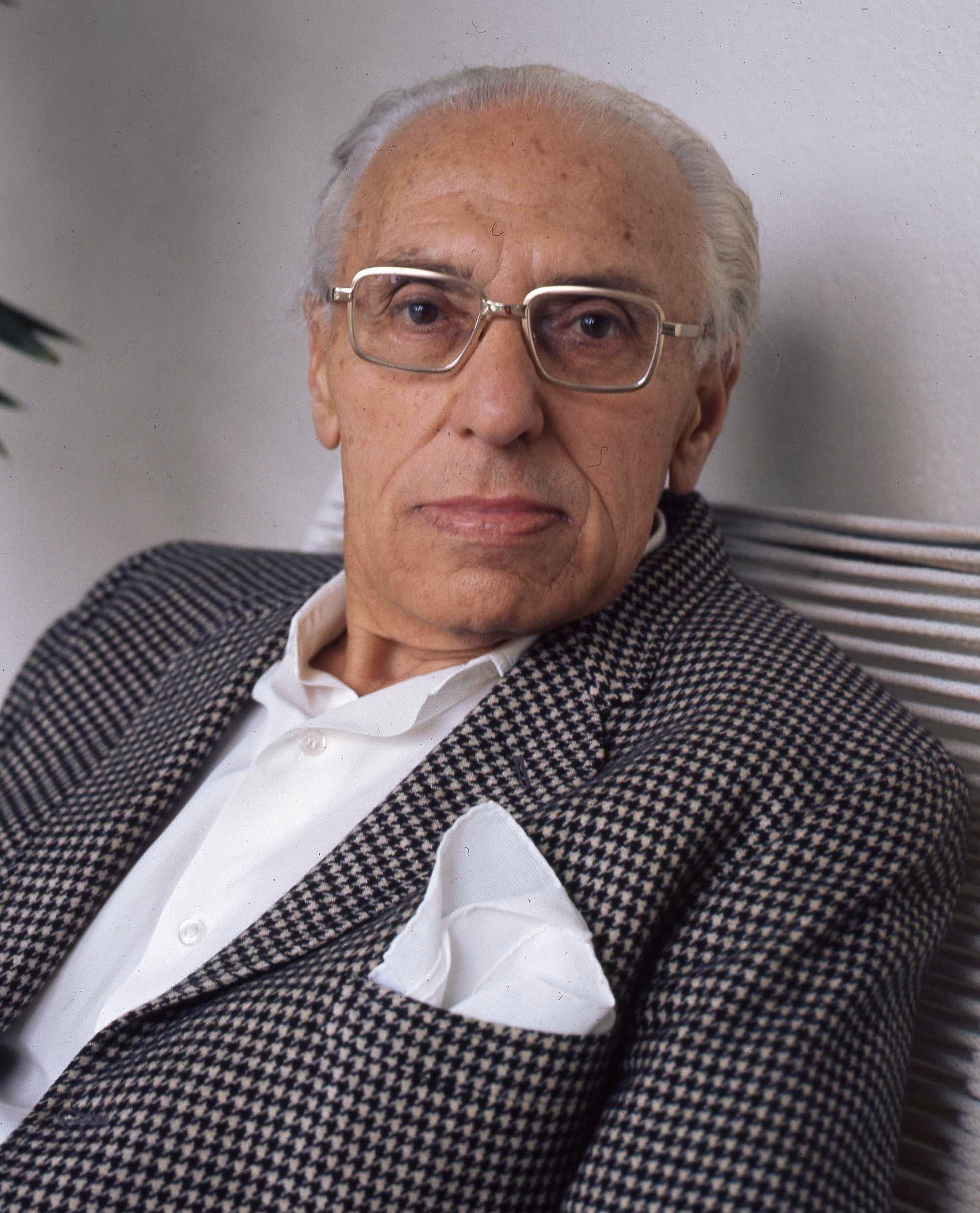
Cukor at home in 1973

It was an open secret in Hollywood that Cukor was gay, at a time when society was against it, although he was discreet about his sexual orientation and "never carried it as a pin on his lapel", as producer Joseph L. Mankiewicz put it. He was a celebrated bon vivant whose luxurious home was the site of weekly Sunday afternoon parties attended by closeted celebrities and the attractive young men they met in bars and gyms and brought with them. At least once, in the midst of his time at MGM, he was arrested on vice charges, but studio executives managed to get the charges dropped and all records of it expunged, and the incident was never publicized by the press. In the late 1950s, Cukor became involved with a considerably younger man named George Towers. He financed his education at the Los Angeles State College of Applied Arts and Sciences and the University of Southern California, from which Towers graduated with a law degree in 1967. That fall Towers married a woman, and his relationship with Cukor evolved into one of father and son, and for the remainder of Cukor's life the two remained very close.

By the mid-1930s, Cukor was not only established as a prominent director, but also socially as an unofficial head of Hollywood's gay subculture. His home, redecorated in 1935 by gay actor-turned-interior designer William Haines with gardens designed by Florence Yoch and Lucile Council, was the scene of many gatherings for the industry's homosexuals. The close-knit group reputedly included Haines and his partner Jimmie Shields, writer W. Somerset Maugham, director James Vincent, screenwriter Rowland Leigh, costume designers Orry-Kelly and Robert Le Maire, and actors John Darrow, Anderson Lawler, Grady Sutton, Robert Seiter, and Tom Douglas. Frank Horn, secretary to Cary Grant, was also a frequent guest.

Cukor's friends were of paramount importance to him and he kept his home filled with their photographs. Regular attendees at his soirées included Katharine Hepburn and Spencer Tracy, Joan Crawford and Douglas Fairbanks Jr., Lauren Bacall and Humphrey Bogart, Claudette Colbert, Marlene Dietrich, Laurence Olivier and Vivien Leigh, actor Richard Cromwell, Stanley Holloway, Judy Garland, Gene Tierney, Noël Coward, Cole Porter, director James Whale, costume designer Edith Head, and Norma Shearer, especially after the death of her first husband Irving Thalberg. He often entertained literary figures like Sinclair Lewis, Theodore Dreiser, Hugh Walpole, Aldous Huxley, and Ferenc Molnár.

Frances Goldwyn, second wife and widow of studio mogul Sam Goldwyn, long considered Cukor to be the love of her life, but their relationship remained platonic. According to biographer A. Scott Berg, Frances even arranged for Cukor's burial to be adjacent to her own plot at Forest Lawn Memorial Park Cemetery.

The PBS series American Masters produced a comprehensive documentary about his life and work titled On Cukor directed by Robert Trachtenberg in 2000.

== Death and legacy ==
Cukor died of a heart attack on January 24, 1983, and was interred in Grave D, Little Garden of Constancy, Garden of Memory (private), Forest Lawn Memorial Park (Glendale), California. Records in probate court indicated his net worth at the time of his death was $2,377,720.

In 1983, the 1954 version of A Star Is Born, considered by many to be his greatest picture, was restored to its original runtime of 181 minutes. In 1954, the film had premiered at a length of 181 minutes and received enormous critical and box office success. However, finding that the length restricted the number of daily showings, the studio cut the movie to 154 minutes, losing some musical numbers and important scenes. Cukor believed this studio alteration had "butchered" the gradual development of the Garland–Mason relationship.

In 2013, The Film Society of Lincoln Center presented a comprehensive weeks-long retrospective of his work titled "The Discreet Charm of George Cukor".

In 2019, Cukor's film Gaslight was selected by the Library of Congress for preservation in the National Film Registry for being "culturally, historically, or aesthetically significant".

== Filmography ==
=== Films ===
| Year | Title | Studio | Genre | Cast | Notes |
|---|---|---|---|---|---|
| 1930 | Grumpy | Paramount Pictures | Drama | Cyril Maude | Co-directed with Cyril Gardner |
| 1930 | The Virtuous Sin | Paramount Pictures | Drama | Kay Francis, Walter Huston, Kenneth MacKenna | Co-directed with Louis J. Gasnier |
| 1930 | The Royal Family of Broadway | Paramount Pictures | Comedy | Fredric March, Ina Claire | Co-directed with Cyril Gardner |
| 1931 | Tarnished Lady | Paramount Pictures | Drama | Tallulah Bankhead, Clive Brook, Alexander Kirkland | |
| 1931 | Girls About Town | Paramount Pictures | Comedy | Kay Francis, Lilyan Tashman, Joel McCrea | |
| 1932 | What Price Hollywood? | RKO Radio Pictures | Drama | Constance Bennett, Lowell Sherman, Neil Hamilton | |
| 1932 | A Bill of Divorcement | RKO Radio Pictures | Drama | Katharine Hepburn, John Barrymore, Billie Burke | |
| 1932 | Rockabye | RKO Radio Pictures | Drama | Constance Bennett, Joel McCrea, Paul Lukas | Reworked the film in two weeks of retakes and was given credit over original director George Fitzmaurice |
| 1933 | Our Betters | RKO Radio Pictures | Drama | Constance Bennett | |
| 1933 | Dinner at Eight | Metro-Goldwyn-Mayer | Drama | John Barrymore, Jean Harlow, Marie Dressler, Lionel Barrymore, Billie Burke, Wallace Beery | |
| 1933 | Little Women | RKO Radio Pictures | Drama | Katharine Hepburn, Joan Bennett, Frances Dee, Douglass Montgomery | |
| 1935 | David Copperfield | Metro-Goldwyn-Mayer | Drama | Freddie Bartholomew, W. C. Fields, Lionel Barrymore | |
| 1935 | Sylvia Scarlett | RKO Radio Pictures | Comedy | Katharine Hepburn, Cary Grant, Brian Aherne | |
| 1936 | Romeo and Juliet | Metro-Goldwyn-Mayer | Romance | Norma Shearer, Leslie Howard, John Barrymore, Basil Rathbone | |
| 1936 | Camille | Metro-Goldwyn-Mayer | Romance | Greta Garbo, Robert Taylor, Lionel Barrymore | |
| 1938 | Holiday | Columbia Pictures | Comedy | Katharine Hepburn, Cary Grant | |
| 1938 | Zaza | Paramount Pictures | Drama | Claudette Colbert, Herbert Marshall | |
| 1939 | The Women | Metro-Goldwyn-Mayer | Drama | Norma Shearer, Joan Crawford, Rosalind Russell | |
| 1940 | Susan and God | Metro-Goldwyn-Mayer | Comedy | Joan Crawford, Fredric March | |
| 1940 | The Philadelphia Story | Metro-Goldwyn-Mayer | Comedy | Katharine Hepburn, Cary Grant, James Stewart | Nominated for six Oscars, including Best Picture |
| 1941 | A Woman's Face | Metro-Goldwyn-Mayer | Drama | Joan Crawford, Melvyn Douglas, Conrad Veidt | |
| 1941 | Two-Faced Woman | Metro-Goldwyn-Mayer | Comedy | Greta Garbo, Melvyn Douglas, Constance Bennett | |
| 1942 | Her Cardboard Lover | Metro-Goldwyn-Mayer | Comedy | Norma Shearer, Robert Taylor, George Sanders | |
| 1943 | Keeper of the Flame | Metro-Goldwyn-Mayer | Drama | Spencer Tracy, Katharine Hepburn | |
| 1944 | Gaslight | Metro-Goldwyn-Mayer | Thriller | Ingrid Bergman, Charles Boyer, Joseph Cotten | Nominated for seven Oscars, including Best Picture |
| 1944 | Winged Victory | 20th Century-Fox, U.S. Army Air Forces | Drama | Lon McCallister, Jeanne Crain, Red Buttons, Don Taylor | |
| 1947 | A Double Life | Kanin Productions | Film noir | Ronald Colman, Signe Hasso, Shelley Winters | |
| 1949 | Edward, My Son | Metro-Goldwyn-Mayer | Drama | Spencer Tracy, Deborah Kerr | |
| 1949 | Adam's Rib | Metro-Goldwyn-Mayer | Comedy | Spencer Tracy, Katharine Hepburn, Judy Holliday | |
| 1950 | A Life of Her Own | Metro-Goldwyn-Mayer | Drama | Lana Turner, Ray Milland | |
| 1950 | Born Yesterday | Columbia Pictures | Comedy | Judy Holliday, Broderick Crawford, William Holden | Nominated for five Oscars including Best Picture |
| 1951 | The Model and the Marriage Broker | 20th Century Fox | Comedy | Thelma Ritter, Jeanne Crain, Scott Brady | |
| 1952 | The Marrying Kind | Columbia Pictures | Comedy | Judy Holliday, Aldo Ray | |
| 1952 | Pat and Mike | Metro-Goldwyn-Mayer | Comedy | Spencer Tracy, Katharine Hepburn, Aldo Ray | |
| 1953 | The Actress | Metro-Goldwyn-Mayer | Comedy | Jean Simmons, Spencer Tracy, Teresa Wright | |
| 1954 | It Should Happen to You | Columbia Pictures | Comedy | Judy Holliday, Peter Lawford, Jack Lemmon | |
| 1954 | A Star Is Born | Warner Bros., Transcona Enterprises | Drama | Judy Garland, James Mason | Premiere version of 182 minutes was cut down to 154 for general release; the surviving elements of the cut scenes were restored into a 178-minute version in 1983 that has become widely available on home media. |
| 1956 | Bhowani Junction | Metro-Goldwyn-Mayer | Drama | Ava Gardner, Stewart Granger | |
| 1957 | Les Girls | Metro-Goldwyn-Mayer | Musical | Gene Kelly, Mitzi Gaynor, Kay Kendall | |
| 1957 | Wild Is the Wind | Paramount Pictures | Drama | Anna Magnani, Anthony Quinn | |
| 1960 | Heller in Pink Tights | Paramount Pictures | Western | Sophia Loren, Anthony Quinn, Steve Forrest | The final film was disavowed by Cukor |
| 1960 | Song Without End | William Goetz | Drama | Dirk Bogarde, Capucine, Geneviève Page | Completed the film when Charles Vidor died during production |
| 1960 | Let's Make Love | The Company of Artists | Musical | Marilyn Monroe, Yves Montand, Tony Randall | |
| 1962 | The Chapman Report | DFZ Productions | Drama | Shelley Winters, Jane Fonda, Claire Bloom, Glynis Johns | |
| 1964 | My Fair Lady | Warner Bros. | Musical | Audrey Hepburn, Rex Harrison | Winner of eight Oscars, including Best Picture |
| 1969 | Justine | 20th Century Fox | Drama | Michael York, Anouk Aimée, Dirk Bogarde | Replaced Joseph Strick shortly after production began |
| 1972 | Travels with My Aunt | Metro-Goldwyn-Mayer | Comedy | Maggie Smith, Alec McCowen, Cindy Williams | |
| 1975 | Love Among the Ruins | ABC Circle Films | Drama | Katharine Hepburn, Laurence Olivier | Television film |
| 1976 | The Blue Bird | 20th Century Fox, Lenfilm Studio, Tower International, Wenks Films | Drama | Elizabeth Taylor, Jane Fonda, Ava Gardner | |
| 1979 | The Corn Is Green | Warner Bros. Television | Drama | Katharine Hepburn, Bill Fraser, Ian Saynor | Television film |
| 1981 | Rich and Famous | Metro-Goldwyn-Mayer | Drama | Jacqueline Bisset, Candice Bergen | |

=== Uncredited contributing work ===
| Year | Title | Studio | Genre | Cast | Notes |
|---|---|---|---|---|---|
| 1932 | One Hour with You | Paramount Pictures | Musical | Maurice Chevalier, Jeanette MacDonald | Directed part of the film when Ernst Lubitsch took ill and was credited as dialogue director |
| 1932 | The Animal Kingdom | RKO Radio Pictures | Drama | Leslie Howard, Ann Harding, Myrna Loy | Uncredited |
| 1934 | Manhattan Melodrama | Metro-Goldwyn-Mayer | Crime | Clark Gable, William Powell, Myrna Loy | Directed additional scenes after production |
| 1935 | No More Ladies | Metro-Goldwyn-Mayer | Comedy | Joan Crawford, Robert Montgomery, Franchot Tone | Completed filming when Edward H. Griffith took ill |
| 1938 | I Met My Love Again | Walter Wanger Productions | Romance | Joan Bennett, Henry Fonda | Assisted Joshua Logan in directing parts of the film |
| 1938 | The Adventures of Tom Sawyer | Selznick International Pictures | Adventure | Tommy Kelly, Jackie Moran | Shot some retakes after production completed |
| 1939 | Gone With the Wind | Selznick International Pictures | Drama | Vivien Leigh, Clark Gable, Olivia de Havilland, Leslie Howard | Fired in the early stages of production, but a few of his scenes remain in the finished film |
| 1943 | "Resistance and Ohm's Law" | Army Signal Corps | Documentary | | instructional short film |
| 1944 | I'll Be Seeing You | Selznick International Pictures | Drama | Ginger Rogers, Joseph Cotten, Shirley Temple | Replaced by William Dieterle during production |
| 1947 | Desire Me | Metro-Goldwyn-Mayer | Drama | Greer Garson, Robert Mitchum | Contributed to the film along with four other directors |
| 1958 | Hot Spell | Paramount Pictures | Drama | Shirley Booth, Anthony Quinn, Shirley MacLaine | Uncredited |
| 1962 | Something's Got to Give | 20th Century Fox | Comedy | Marilyn Monroe, Dean Martin, Cyd Charisse | The film was abandoned after Monroe's death / 37 minutes of footage survives |

== Award and nominations ==
| Award | Year | Category | Work | Result |
|---|---|---|---|---|
| Academy Awards | 1934 | Best Director | Little Women | Nominated |
| Academy Awards | 1941 | Best Director | The Philadelphia Story | Nominated |
| Academy Awards | 1948 | Best Director | A Double Life | Nominated |
| Academy Awards | 1951 | Best Director | Born Yesterday | Nominated |
| Academy Awards | 1965 | Best Director | My Fair Lady | Won |
| British Academy Film Awards | 1961 | Best Film From Any Source | Let's Make Love | Nominated |
| British Academy Film Awards | 1966 | Best Film From Any Source | My Fair Lady | Won |
| Golden Globe Awards | 1951 | Best Director | Born Yesterday | Nominated |
| Golden Globe Awards | 1963 | Best Director | The Chapman Report | Nominated |
| Golden Globe Awards | 1965 | Best Director | My Fair Lady | Won |
| Primetime Emmy Awards | 1975 | Outstanding Directing in a Special Program - Drama or Comedy | Love Among the Ruins | Won |
| Berlin International Film Festival | 1958 | Golden Bear | Wild Is the Wind | Nominated |
| Cannes Film Festival | 1946 | Grand Prix | Gaslight | Nominated |
| Venice Film Festival | 1934 | Mussolini Cup | Little Women | Nominated |
| Venice Film Festival | 1935 | Mussolini Cup | David Copperfield | Nominated |
| Venice Film Festival | 1948 | Grand International Prize | A Double Life | Nominated |
| Venice Film Festival | 1951 | Golden Lion | Born Yesterday | Nominated |
| Venice Film Festival | 1982 | Golden Lion for Lifetime Achievement | —N/a | Honored |
| Directors Guild of America Awards | 1953 | Outstanding Directing – Feature Film | Pat and Mike | Nominated |
| Directors Guild of America Awards | 1955 | Outstanding Directing – Feature Film | A Star Is Born | Nominated |
| Directors Guild of America Awards | 1958 | Outstanding Directing – Feature Film | Les Girls | Nominated |
| Directors Guild of America Awards | 1965 | Outstanding Directing – Feature Film | My Fair Lady | Won |
| Directors Guild of America Awards | 1981 | D. W. Griffith Award | —N/a | Honored |

=== Oscar-Related Performances ===
Cukor has directed multiple Oscar nominated and winning performances in his feature films.

| Year | Performer | Nominated Work | Result |
Academy Award for Best Actor
| 1931 | Fredric March | The Royal Family of Broadway | Nominated |
| 1941 | James Stewart | The Philadelphia Story | Won |
| 1945 | Charles Boyer | Gaslight | Nominated |
| 1948 | Ronald Colman | A Double Life | Won |
| 1955 | James Mason | A Star Is Born | Nominated |
| 1958 | Anthony Quinn | Wild Is the Wind | Nominated |
| 1965 | Rex Harrison | My Fair Lady | Won |
Academy Award for Best Actress
| 1937 | Norma Shearer | Romeo and Juliet | Nominated |
| 1938 | Greta Garbo | Camille | Nominated |
| 1941 | Katharine Hepburn | The Philadelphia Story | Nominated |
| 1945 | Ingrid Bergman | Gaslight | Won |
| 1950 | Deborah Kerr | Edward, My Son | Nominated |
| 1951 | Judy Holliday | Born Yesterday | Won |
| 1955 | Judy Garland | A Star Is Born | Nominated |
| 1958 | Anna Magnani | Wild Is the Wind | Nominated |
| 1973 | Maggie Smith | Travels with My Aunt | Nominated |
Academy Award for Best Supporting Actor
| 1937 | Basil Rathbone | Romeo and Juliet | Nominated |
| 1965 | Stanley Holloway | My Fair Lady | Nominated |
Academy Award for Best Supporting Actress
| 1941 | Ruth Hussey | The Philadelphia Story | Nominated |
| 1945 | Angela Lansbury | Gaslight | Nominated |
| 1965 | Gladys Cooper | My Fair Lady | Nominated |

== Sources ==
- Hillstrom, Laurie Collier, International Dictionary of Films and Filmmakers. Detroit: St. James Press, 1997. ISBN 1-55862-302-7.
- Katz, Ephraim, The Film Encyclopedia. New York: HarperCollins, 2001. ISBN 0-06-273755-4.
- Levy, Emanuel, George Cukor, Master of Elegance. The Director and his Stars. New York, William Morrow, 1994.
- McGilligan, Patrick, George Cukor: A Double Life. New York: St. Martin's Press 1991. ISBN 0-312-05419-X
- Myrick, Susan, White Columns in Hollywood: Reports from the GWTW Sets. Macon, Georgia: Mercer University Press, 1982 ISBN 0-86554-044-6.
- Wakeman, John, World Film Directors. New York: H. W. Wilson Company 1987. ISBN 0-8242-0757-2.

== Bibliography ==
- Lambert, Gavin; Cukor, George; Trachtenberg, Robert (September 1, 2000). On Cukor. Rizzoli. ISBN 9780847822973.
- Long, Robert Emmet (2001). George Cukor: Interviews. Univ. Press of Mississippi. ISBN 978-1-57806-387-1.
- Phillips, Gene D. (1982). George Cukor. Twayne Publishers. ISBN 978-0-8057-9286-7.
