= The Lovers! (1973 film) =

1973 British film

- Film Poster
- Directed by: Herbert Wise
- Written by: Jack Rosenthal
- Based on: The Lovers by Jack Rosenthal
- Produced by: Maurice Foster
- Starring: Richard Beckinsale; Paula Wilcox; Jeremy (Bruce Watt)
- Cinematography: Bob Huke
- Edited by: Bernard Gribble
- Music by: Carl Davis
- Production company: British Lion Film Corporation
- Distributed by: British Lion Film Corporation
- Release date: 14 May 1973 (UK)
- Running time: 88 minutes
- Country: United Kingdom
- Language: English
- Budget: £62,668
- Box office: £177,649

The Lovers! is a 1973 British comedy film based on the 1970-71 Granada Television sitcom The Lovers. It follows the courtship of two young people from Manchester, England, Geoffrey Scrimshaw (Richard Beckinsale) and Beryl Battersby (Paula Wilcox).

== Plot ==
In 1972 Manchester, three girls are window shopping at the George Best Boutique. Three boys stand opposite them and decide which girl they want to take out. Geoffrey Scrimshaw unwittingly ends up with Beryl Battersby, as he gets the last choice. A slow, mutual admiration began between the two of them. Their parents tried to use trendy terms but are mocked because they are a decade behind. When Geoffrey is with his male friends, he boasts about non-existent conquests.

The young couple have differing opinions on the permissive society: Geoffrey wants to be a part of it, but Beryl wants to wait until marriage.

On his first meeting with her mother, they sit quietly in the living room, drinking tea and eating sardine sandwiches. They cuddle in front of the electric fire after a game of Scrabble. Their relationship was going too slowly so they decided to split up.

On his way to meet his parents to watch Fiddler on the Roof for his mother's birthday, Geoffrey met Veronica and went off with her instead. They went to a strip bar and Veronica asked him back to her flat. However, when Veronica is about to enter the room, her little brother Jeremy appears and the young boy gives Geoffrey a very technical description of "how to make a baby."

Beryl and Geoffrey meet again at a house party and try to ignore each other. Both try to be "trendy" in their chat up techniques. On the stairs, Edith expounds the values of Women's Lib. Smoking a joint, she takes off her bra and tells Geoffrey to burn it. Beryl storms off and goes to help wash the dishes in the kitchen with Geoffrey's nerdy friend.

Beryl phones him to say she does not want to ever see him again but told him that she will be at the school jumble sale the next day. He shows up and invites her to a football match to watch Huddersfield play. The relationship still fails to gel. They go to the rooftop of Hotel Piccadilly and discuss communication and happiness with both of them coming to realize that they don't really like each other.

Meanwhile, Sandra is pregnant and planning to get married. Beryl is seated next to Geoffrey at the reception meal. Splitting up brings them closer together. He discusses going to a "match" and she wrongly assumes he is going to a football match, but it is off-season (he meant cricket). He tracks her down to the empty football stadium where they sit and discuss relationships. Time jumps to them sitting in the same seats in a crowded stadium, with Beryl looking adoringly at him.

The picture freezes and the caption "Not really the End" appears.

== Cast ==
- Richard Beckinsale as Geoffrey Scrimshaw
- Paula Wilcox as Beryl Battersby
- Susan Littler as Sandra
- Rosalind Ayres as Veronica
- Anthony Naylor as Neville
- Nikolas Simmonds as Roland
- John Comer as Geoffrey's father
- Stella Moray as Geoffrey's mother
- Joan Scott as Beryl's mum
- Pamela Moiseiwitch as Enid
- Bruce Watt as Jeremy
- Paul Greenwood as Trainee Manager (Party)
- Bernard Latham as "Handsome" (Party)
- Karen Ford as Foreign Girl (Party)
- James Snell as Doctor
- Mary Henry as Woman (Jumble Sale)
- Serena as Stripper
- Maggie Flint as Bookstall Manageress
- Ian Gray as Bookstall Assistant

== Production ==
=== Filming ===
The movie was filmed in 1972 and featured views of various locations in Manchester of the time, including George Best's "Edwardia" boutique and Manchester United's Old Trafford football stadium. The scenes inside the railway station where Geoffrey and Beryl meet were filmed at Windsor & Eton Central railway station. The film premiered at the Odeon Cinema, Manchester on 14 May 1973.

=== Music ===
The theme song, Love and Rainy Weather, sung by Tony Christie and written by Mitch Murray and Peter Callander, was released as a single by MCA in 1973.

== Home media ==
In 2013, Network released a Region 2 DVD of the film, later in a 4-DVD package "British Film Comedy — The 70s" with Sunstruck starring Harry Secombe, The House in Nightmare Park and The Best of Benny Hill.
