= Bloomers (TV series) =

1979 BBC sitcom

- Genre: Sitcom
- Written by: James Saunders
- Starring: Richard Beckinsale; Anna Calder-Marshall; Paul Curran; David Swift
- Country of origin: United Kingdom
- No. of episodes: 6 (1 cancelled)

Production
- Running time: 30 minutes

Original release
- Network: BBC2
- Release: 27 September – 25 October 1979

Bloomers is a British sitcom starring Richard Beckinsale that aired on BBC2 in 1979. Five episodes of the show were made before Beckinsale died suddenly from a heart attack just before a planned rehearsal for the sixth and final episode of the first series. Bloomers was immediately shelved, though the five completed episodes were broadcast later in the same year.

== Plot ==
Stan is a worker for a small London flower business. The humour centred on the relationships between the workers and the scrapes they got into doing odd jobs in the gardens of houses in the district. Beckinsale's character, Stan, was apt to wind up in bed with lonely housewives, and equally apt to spend time with said housewives musing on philosophy and the pointlessness of life.

== Cast ==
- Richard Beckinsale – Stan
- Anna Calder-Marshall – Lena
- Paul Curran – George
- David Swift – Dingley
- Pat Gorman – Pub Landlord
- June Ritchie – Diana
- Beryl Nesbitt – Connie
- Declan Mulholland - O'Shaughnessy
- Vernon Dobtcheff - Dr. Lamb
- Glory Annen - Dr. Lamb's Daughter

== Background ==
Writer James Saunders thought up the idea for Bloomers while talking with actor John Challis, who owned and worked at a garden centre, while taking a break from acting; said Saunders: "The idea was based on fact. The local florist was telling me about the number of funny things that happened and I thought it would make a good series." Challis stated: "I remember the writer James Saunders was a customer at my garden centre and he wrote a script about my experiences. I gave the script to my agent who gave it to John Howard Davies at the BBC who was looking for a vehicle for Richard Beckinsale. So Bloomers was written with me in mind but I wasn't famous enough, but Richard Beckinsale was wonderful and I got an episode out of it!" The scene in episode three where Stan and Dingley attempt to steal Christmas trees from a roundabout was based on a real-life incident with Challis. In the episode, Challis plays one of the policemen who busts up the theft.

The five completed episodes of Bloomers were recorded prior to Christmas 1978. Due to an industrial dispute at the BBC, (the same dispute which delayed the recording of the final episode of Fawlty Towers), the recording of the sixth episode was postponed until 20 March, but it ended up never being recorded at all, due to Beckinsale's death the previous day.

== Episodes ==
No.	Title	Original release date
1	"Partnership"	27 September 1979
After an argument with Lena, Stan decides he must get a job because, being an actor, he spends most of his time out of work. He strikes up a friendship with Dingley, who offers him a partnership in his florist shop.
2	"First Day"	4 October 1979
Lena can't understand Stan's complete change of character, including his getting out of bed. Stan, however, wants to make his first day as a florist/gardener one to remember.
3	"The Contract"	11 October 1979
Stan gets a film studio contract to deliver Christmas trees. But even a florist has difficulty getting Christmas trees in June.
4	"The Yellow Line"	18 October 1979
Dingley is very depressed about life and the fact that the Council are going to paint a yellow line outside the shop. Stan gives him a philosophy book called "Action and Being" and gets more action than he expects.
5	"Dr. Lamb"	25 October 1979
Dingley and O'Shaughnessy, a part-time helper at the florist shop, call at Stan's flat on their way to work on Dr. Lamb's garden. By coincidence, he happens to be Lena's psychiatrist.
6	Unknown	Never recorded
O'Shaughnessy asks Stan if he and his fiance could stay at Stan's flat for a few hours, but Lena's mother is visiting. Meanwhile, Stan attempts to do a good deed for an elderly woman.

== Broadcast ==
Beckinsale's widow, Judy Loe, gave her approval for the five completed episodes to be broadcast. Bloomers aired from 27 September 1979 to 25 October 1979 on BBC2. Four of the episodes were given a repeat viewing the following year on BBC1 from 6 August 1980 to 27 August 1980. The show also aired in 1983 on ABC in Australia and the only publicly available recordings of Bloomers are from these broadcasts. Poor quality transfers of the five episodes are available to view on YouTube. Bloomers has never been aired again by the BBC, nor has there been any official release of the series.
