= The Stalker's Apprentice =

1998 British television film

- Genre: Thriller
- Created by: M.S. Power
- Written by: Gordon Hamm
- Directed by: Marcus D.F. White
- Starring: Gideon Turner; Peter Davison; James Bolam; Paula Wilcox; Natalie Walter; Peter Forbes; Liz May Brice
- Composer: Colin Towns
- Country of origin: United Kingdom
- No. of episodes: 1

Production
- Executive producer: Robert Love
- Producer: Mark Grindle
- Editor: Jamie McCoan
- Running time: 76 minutes
- Production company: Scottish Television

Original release
- Network: ITV
- Release: 25 May 1998

The Stalker's Apprentice is a single British television crime drama film, based on the novel by author M.S. Power, that was the first broadcast on ITV on 25 May 1998. The film stars Gideon Turner as Marcus Walwyn, a book editor who is driven to murder after reading a draft novel composed by Helmut Kranze (James Bolam), a former serial killer recently released from prison who is writing under a pseudonym. The film follows Walwyn as he embarks on a series of murders relating to Karen Scott (Natalie Walter), a young woman that he meets on the train to work, and the subsequent police investigation by D.I. Maurice Birt (Peter Davison), commander of the local police force.

The film co-stars Paula Wilcox, Peter Forbes and Liz May Brice in her breakthrough TV role. An independent review from Movie NZ said of the film; "[it] has a wonderfully methodical cool to it as we watch Gideon Turner, accompanied by a voiceover, putting into use the methodology from the killer's book. However. partway in, The Stalker's Apprentice abruptly becomes a policier as we follow detective Peter Davison and assistant Peter Forbes as they piece clues together. These scenes hold one's attention, although not as absorbingly as the stalker element. Eventually, the film works through a tight plot filled with sharp twists and considerable tension." The film was released on DVD in the United States on 7 March 2006, via Koch Media. A Region 4 release followed on 19 May 2010. The film has yet to be released on Region 2 DVD. The film is often repeated on True Entertainment as part of their semi-regular 'British Thrillers' season.

== Plot ==
Marcus Walwyn (Gideon Turner) is a reader at a publishing firm. He reads a manuscript entitled ‘Death in Santiago’ by Helmut Kranze (James Bolam), which gives detailed accounts of how to stalk victims and commit perfect murders. At the same time, Marcus becomes fixated on waitress Karen Scott (Natalie Walters) after he encounters her on the subway. He stalks and gathers information about her, while befriending her at the café where she works. However, Karen's friend Sharon (Vanessa Hadaway) gets in the way and Marcus learns that Karen has a boyfriend, Darren (Guy Leverton). He then contrives to kill both Sharon and Darren, using the advice in Kranze's book. On both occasions, he carves an asterisk into the victim's forehead as his signature. Police inspector Maurice Birt (Peter Davison) investigates. Clues all point to the killer being Marcus but they are unable to find any direct evidence that ties him. At the same time, Marcus discovers that in reality Kranze is convicted murderer Herbert Zanker and that the crimes in the book are ones that Zanker is boasting about having conducted himself.

== Cast ==
- Gideon Turner as Marcus Walwyn
- Peter Davison as D.I. Maurice Birt
- James Bolam as Helmut Kranze
- Paula Wilcox as Heather Walwyn
- Natalie Walter as Karen Scott
- Peter Forbes as D.S. Ray Wilson
- Liz May Brice as Heather Brazier-Young
- Vanessa Hadaway as Sharon Hayes
- Marc Bannerman as Paul Cornell
- Guy Leverton as Darren Cornell
- Michael MacKenzie as Harry Rutherford
- Marytn James as Richard Brazier-Young
- Angela Chadfield as Patricia Brazier-Young
