= Colour Strike =

ITV technicians' strike in the United Kingdom (1970–1971)

The Colour Strike was an industrial action by technicians at ITV companies which ran from 13 November 1970 to 8 February 1971. Due to a pay dispute, technicians refused to work with colour television equipment. Some shows made during this period aired in black-and-white as late as December 1971.

== History ==
At that time, ITV had recently switched to colour transmissions, requiring the individual companies to invest heavily in new equipment. Early colour television studio cameras consisted of four tubes to relay the picture: three were receptive to colour (red, green and blue – the chrominance signal) with the fourth providing a high-resolution monochrome image (the luminance signal). The final colour picture was created by combining the chrominance and luminance signals, but the technicians simply switched off the colour tubes whilst this dispute took place.

This meant that even though colour equipment was available, all shows were recorded and broadcast in black-and-white, thus denying the ITV companies the ability to sell airtime at the higher value that colour transmissions dictated.

In some film sequences for location shots in these programmes (shot in colour), the colour signal from the telecine machine had to be switched off in the vision mixing desk before being recorded to tape, but this was partly unsuccessful, leading to some film sequences being recorded with an odd array of pale colours (as for items where the colour is a mix of two primary colours, only one primary colour would show). This is prominent in the second series of Hadleigh, for example.

The first Coronation Street episode to be broadcast in colour was transmitted on 3 November 1969, but due to the strike, some 1970–71 episodes, including the one featuring Valerie Barlow's electrocution, were recorded in black-and-white. The last black-and-white edition was shown on 10 February 1971, although the episodes transmitted between 22 and 24 February 1971 contained black-and-white film inserts.

All of ITV's programmes were broadcast in black-and-white throughout this period, including scheduled repeats and regional programmes. During this time, ATV showed a modified version of its regular caption slide An ATV Colour Production at the end of its shows, which had the word 'colour' blanked out, with Granada's regular caption slide also omitting the words 'Colour Production' to reflect this fact too.

The strike was called off on 2 February 1971 with all colour production and transmissions resuming on 8 February.

Four ITV regions were still broadcasting exclusively in black-and-white prior to the start of the Colour Strike and would not commence colour broadcasts until the following dates: Westward Television (22 May 1971), Border Television (1 September 1971), Grampian Television (30 September 1971) and Channel Television (26 July 1976).

There was also a short dispute two years later in early 1973; this affected both BBC channels as well as ITV.

== List of shows affected by the ITV colour strike ==
=== ATV ===
- The Golden Shot (episodes 10 to 21 of series three)
- Timeslip (episodes 23 and 24)
- Crossroads (all episodes transmitted on and between Tuesday 17 November 1970 and Friday 12 February 1971)
- Hine
- The Misfit
- The Dickie Henderson Show
- Girls About Town (episodes 4 to 7 of series two)

=== Granada ===
- Coronation Street (all episodes transmitted on and between Monday 16 November 1970 and Wednesday 10 February 1971. In addition, the short segment for the All Star Comedy Carnival was recorded and transmitted in black-and-white on Friday 25 December 1970 and the episodes transmitted between Monday 22 February 1971 and Wednesday 24 February 1971 had contained black-and-white location inserts)
- A Family at War (episodes 12 to 19 of series two)
- Nearest and Dearest (episodes 2 to 8 of series five)

=== LWT ===
- Budgie (the first four episodes of series one)
- Please Sir (the last three episodes of series three)
- Upstairs, Downstairs (the first half of series one was made in black-and-white; the first episode was later re-shot in colour for broadcast, with two different endings, i.e. Sarah stays and Sarah leaves. The remaining black-and-white episodes are often not shown in overseas syndicated broadcasts, and the Sarah leaves ending of the first episode enables continuity to be maintained when skipping over the black-and-white episodes)
- The Big Match (22 November 1970 – 7 February 1971)
- World of Sport (21 November 1970 – 6 February 1971)
- Doctor at Large (the first six episodes)
- On the Buses (episodes 5, 8, 9, 10, 11, 12 and 13 of series four in black-and-white)
- All Star Comedy Carnival (1970)
- The Trouble with You, Lilian (all but episode 1)
- Six Dates with Barker (Show 3 "1971: The Odd Job" in black-and-white)
- The Frighteners (two episodes out of thirteen in black-and-white, the episodes "Miss Mouse" and "Have a Nice Time at the Zoo, Darling")

=== Southern ===
- Freewheelers (episodes 6 to 11 and 13 of series five)

=== Thames ===
- This is Your Life (first half of series eleven)
- Bless This House (the first seven episodes of series one, the opening titles to the eighth episode was transmitted in black-and-white)
- Carry On Again Christmas
- David Nixon's Magic Box (episodes 1 to 8 of series two)
- The Mind of Mr. J.G. Reeder (all of series two in black and white, apart from "Man with a Strange Tattoo" and "Find the Lady")
- Never Mind the Quality, Feel the Width (episodes 1, 3, 4 and 7 of series five)
- Elephant's Eggs in a Rhubarb Tree (three out of six editions)
- The Sooty Show
- The Benny Hill Show (3 specials – 23 December 1970, 27 January 1971 and 24 February 1971; the "Love Will Find A Way" segment in the 1974 film The Best of Benny Hill originated from the 27 January 1971 special)
- Public Eye (five episodes from series five in black-and-white)
- Shadows of Fear (episode 10 "Come Into My Parlour")
- Opportunity Knocks (the final four episodes of series ten)

=== Yorkshire ===
- Dear Mother...Love Albert (all six episodes of series three)
- Mr Digby, Darling (all six episodes of series three)
- Hadleigh (episodes 1, 2, 8, 9 and 13 of series two – the last five black-and-white episodes of that series to be made)
- Queenie's Castle (episodes 3 to 6 of series one)

== See also ==
- ITV Emergency National Service
- 1979 ITV strike
