= Judy Loe =

British actress (1947–2025)

- Loe in the 1990s
- Born: Judith Margaret Loe; 6 March 1947; Urmston, Lancashire, England
- Died: 15 July 2025 (aged 78)
- Occupation: Actress
- Years active: 1970–2024
- Spouses: Richard Beckinsale (m. 1977; died 1979) Roy Battersby (m. 1997; died 2024)
- Children: Kate Beckinsale
- Relatives: Samantha Beckinsale (stepdaughter)

Judith Margaret Loe (6 March 1947 – 15 July 2025), known as Judy Loe, was an English actress known for her work in television.

== Early life ==
Loe was born in Urmston, Lancashire, on 6 March 1947, the only child of Norman Scarborough Loe, who worked in the equipment business, and Nancy Loe (née Jones), who was a department store worker and model. She attended Urmston Grammar School and the University of Birmingham, from where she graduated with a bachelor of arts degree in English and drama.

== Television ==
Loe was in the original British cast of the rock musical Hair. In 1970 she made her debut on British television in the ITV Thames Television programme Ace of Wands, broadcast 1970–72, as Lillian "Lulli" Palmer. Loe then made guest appearances in series such as Z-Cars, Dixon of Dock Green, Man at the Top, Armchair Theatre and ITV Playhouse.

In 1973, Loe was cast as Alice Lee in the five-episode television series Woodstock. In 1975 she appeared in the role of Princess May in the ATV drama series Edward the Seventh. She made guest appearances in comedies such as Ripping Yarns, Robin's Nest, The Upchat Line and Miss Jones and Son. In 1978 she appeared in an episode of the television drama Crown Court before landing the role of Dr Helen Sanders in the final two series of the television drama General Hospital playing the role from 1978 until 1979.

In 1980, Loe appeared in one episode each of Heartland and The Gentle Touch before appearing in two episodes of Sunday Night Thriller and three episodes of When the Boat Comes In (1981). She starred alongside Donald Churchill in the ITV sitcom Goodnight and God Bless and made a brief appearance as a nurse in Monty Python's The Meaning of Life (1983). In 1984, Loe starred as the abandoned housewife Allison in the six-part BBC1 serial Missing From Home by Roger Marshall and directed by Douglas Camfield. She made guest appearances in drama programmes up to 1985 before landing the role of Diane in the television programme Yesterday's Dreams in 1987. In 1988, Loe gained the role of Pamela in the Yorkshire Television sitcom Singles with Roger Rees; this was the first sitcom Loe starred in and which lasted three series until 1991. In 1990, she took a regular role in The Chief, playing Dr. Elizabeth Stafford until 1993.

In 1997, Loe played Adele Cecil in "Death Is Now My Neighbour", an episode of Inspector Morse, reprising her role the following year in "The Wench is Dead". In 1998, she starred as Commander Kathryn MacTiernan in Space Island One.

In the early 2000s, Loe played Jan Goddard in Casualty and its spinoff Holby City after previously appearing as different guest characters in one episode of each series. In 2009 she appeared in the medical drama Doctors.

== Personal life and death ==
Loe was married to actor Richard Beckinsale from 1977 until his death in 1979. She was later married to television director Roy Battersby until his death in 2024. She was the mother of film actress Kate Beckinsale, stepmother of Kate's half-sister and television actress Samantha Beckinsale.

Loe died from cancer on 15 July 2025, at the age of 78.

== Filmography ==
Year	Title	Role
1970	Hair	
1970–1971	Ace of Wands	Lulli Palmer
1972	Man of Straw	Katchen Zillich
1972	Z Cars – "Tessa in the Woodpile"	Tessa Ford
1972	Man at the Top – "All Very Hush, Hush"	Sheri Lomax
1972	Armchair Theatre – "The Stumbling Block"	Jenny
1972, 1980	Playhouse – "A Splinter of Ice" and "Visitors for Anderson"	Clemence (one episode) Jen (one episode)
1973	Woodstock	Alice Lee
1975	Dixon of Dock Green – "Conspiracy"	Sally Bell
1975	Edward the Seventh	Princess May
1975–1976	Couples	Young Woman (four episodes) Mrs. Hewitt (three episodes)
1977	Robin's Nest – "Piggy in the Middle"	Sarah
1977	Ripping Yarns – "The Curse of the Claw"	Chief Petty Officer Russell
1977	The Upchat Line – "One Good Turn"	Wendy Johnson
1978	Miss Jones and Son – "Will You Be My Wife?"	Jill
1978	Crown Court – "The Change"	Marianne Miller
1978–1979	General Hospital – "Instinct" and "Long Weekend"	Dr. Helen Sanders
1979–1980	Heartland – "The Letter of the Law" and "Working Arrangements"	Susan Purser
1980–1981	The Gentle Touch – "Menaces" and "Protection"	June Stafford
1981	Sunday Night Thriller – "The Business of Murder"	Dee
1981	When the Boat Comes In "Action!" "Comrades in Arms" "Roll of Honour"	Tania Corley
1982	Let There Be Love – "Getting to Know You"	Alison
1982	Play for Today – "Life After Death"	Hilary
1983	The Home Front – "The Poodle Strikes Back"	Shirley
1983	The Meaning of Life	Nurse #1
1983	Goodnight and God Bless "Treachery Begins at Home" "Little Green-Eyed Monster" "Did You Hear the One About...?" "The Grand Illusion" "Ronnie's Wonderful Day" "You Won't Feel a Thing"	Celia Kemp (six episodes)
1983	Singles	Briony
1984	Missing From Home	Allison Reynolds
1984	Fox Mystery Theater – "In Possession"	Betty Mervyn
1985	Travelling Man – "The Quiet Chapter"	Diana Arkell
1987	Yesterday's Dreams	Diane Daniels
1988–1991	Singles	Pamela
1990	Boon – "The Belles of St. Godwalds"	Deborah
1990–1993	The Chief	Dr. Elizabeth Stafford
1992	Between the Lines – "Lies and Damned Lies"	Radio Interviewer (voice)
1994	Peak Practice – "Power Games"	Sheila Massey
1995	Revelations	Jessica Rattigan
1995–2002	Casualty	Roz McGregor (one episode) Jan Goddard (22 episodes)
1997	The Moth	Kate Thorman
1997, 1998	Inspector Morse – "Death Is Now My Neighbour" and "The Wench Is Dead"	Adele Cecil
1998	Space Island One	Commander Kathryn McTiernan
1999	Doomwatch: Winter Angel	Angel (voice)
2001–2003	Holby City	Geraldine Thompson (one episode) Jan Goddard (nine episodes)
2003	Silent Witness – "Fatal Error"	Nina Taylor, QC
2004	The Bill – "Last Orders"	Adela Pearce
2008	Trial & Retribution – "The Box"	Eileen Banks
2009	Doctors – "But for the Grace of God"	Paula Stott
2015	Absolutely Anything	Canteen Lady
2016	Walliams & Friend – "Jack Whitehall"	Mrs. Hudson
2024	Fool Me Once – "Episode Six"	Glamorous Woman
