= Goodnight and God Bless =

British television sitcom

- Genre: Sitcom
- Written by: Donald Churchill; Joseph McGrath
- Directed by: Alan Dossor
- Starring: Donald Churchill; Judy Loe; James Cossins
- Country of origin: United Kingdom
- Original language: English
- No. of series: 1
- No. of episodes: 6

Production
- Producers: Alan Dossor; Joseph McGrath
- Running time: 30 minutes
- Production company: Central Independent Television

Original release
- Network: ITV
- Release: 12 April – 17 May 1983

Goodnight and God Bless is a British television sitcom which first aired on ITV in 1983. It is based around the life of popular television quiz host Ronnie Kemp, whose staff and father-in-law hate him.

Actors who appeared in episodes of the series include Lisa Daniely, George A. Cooper, Leslie Grantham, Nat Jackley, Gwen Taylor, Jean Boht, Constance Chapman and Lloyd Lamble.

== Main cast ==
- Donald Churchill as Ronnie Kemp
- Judy Loe as Celia Kemp
- James Cossins as Geoffrey
- Nick Stringer as Harry
- Tracey Perry as Debbie
- Rowena Cooper as Audrey

== Bibliography ==
- Jerry Roberts. Encyclopedia of Television Film Directors. Scarecrow Press, 2009.
