= Tree Carr =

American singer

- Born: United States
- Origin: London, England
- Genres: Indie rock, folk, electro, punk, black metal
- Occupations: Author, singer, multi-instrumentalist, actress
- Instruments: Electric guitar, acoustic guitar, keyboards, wind instruments, percussion
- Years active: 1998–present

Tree Carr is an American author, death midwife and mystic. She has authored books on dreaming.

She has also worked as a musician, singer, filmmaker and actor. She was the owner of Today is Boring, a DVD rental shop and cult film society based in east London between 2002 and 2012.

== Books ==
=== Non-fiction ===
● Dreams: How to connect with your dreams to enrich your life (2018)

● Welcome To The Dark Side: Occult London (2019)

● Conscious Dreamer: Connect with the power of your dreams & live your best life (2021)

== Discography ==
Appears on

- 2003: Ten Minutes With My Dad: White Van Man (10") Label Catastrophic
- 2004: Ten Minutes With My Dad: Yesterday I Died (10", EP) Label Catastrophic
- 2004: Rough Trade Counter Culture 2004: Mute Records
- 2005: Mond Club Selection (CD, Comp) Sinnamon Records
- 2006: M.Craft: Silver And Fire (CD) 679 Recordings
- 2006: M.Craft: Silver And Fire / You Are The Music (7") 679 Recordings
- 2008: Gobsausage: Below The Gumline (CD) Dada Discs
- 2009: Cristine: Amerika (CD Album) 51 Records
- 2010: Ali Love: Love Harder- Done The Dirty (CD Album) Back Yard Recordings
- 2012: Adam Ant: Gun in Your Pocket (Cool Zombie B-side) Blueblack Hussar Records
- 2013: Adam Ant: Who's A Goofy Bunny (track on Adam Ant Is the Blueblack Hussar in Marrying the Gunner's Daughter) Blueblack Hussar Records
- 2018: Youth of America: YOA Rising

== Music ==
In 1998 she began a black metal noise project called Tree of Death, using influences from the sounds of black metal and lo-fi electro. In 2002 she joined the electro punk band, Gobsausage and appeared as guest vocals on the album "Below The Gumline." In 2003 she formed the art/punk duo Ten Minutes with My Dad, drawing musical influences from early girl punk, heavy metal and lo-fi electro. A limited edition 10" LP called "Yesterday I Died" was released on Label Catastrophic. She also released some limited editions with American artist, Disastronaut called "White Van Man" in 2003. In 2004 she joined singer songwriter M. Craft (Martin Craft) on backing vocals, keyboards and glockenspiel. She appears on the critically acclaimed album "Silver and Fire" released in 2005 by 679 Recordings. In 2006 she joined the post punk band Cristine, along with Douglas Hart, formerly of The Jesus and Mary Chain and Robert Schultzberg, formerly of Placebo. In 2008, they toured with Primal Scream on the NME Rock & Roll Riot Tour. In March 2010 she began performing gigs and recording as a backing singer for Adam Ant.

== Filmography ==
As director

● 2012: Into The Blue

● 2012: This Is Not A Fashion Film

As writer

● 2012: Into The Blue

● 2012: This Is Not A Fashion Film

=== As producer ===
● 2010: The Strangers Within

● 2012: This Is Not A Fashion Film

● 2012: Live East Die Young

● 2012: Into The Blue

=== As composer ===
● 2010: The Midnight Pen-pal

● 2012: This Is Not A Fashion Film

As actor

Tree first appeared in Jake West's Evil Aliens (2006), a British "splatstick" horror-comedy film. She also appeared in the 2006 award-winning film Cashback by Sean Ellis. In 2007, she appeared in a short film by Mike Figgis called Coole Stories. In 2008 she worked with American visual artist and composer Christian Marclay and godfather of electroacoustic improvisation, Keith Rowe, on a controversial short film called Solo. Recently she took a role in Doghouse, an all female zombie comedy out in 2009 and has also appeared in videos for London-based lingerie brand, Agent Provocateur featuring directors, Douglas Hart and Nigel Askew. She has also appeared in music videos for fashion designer and singer, Pam Hogg and appeared in the music video for the Peaches single "Talk to Me" released in May 2009.

- 2006: Evil Aliens
- 2006: Cashback
- 2007: Coole Stories by Mike Figgis
- 2008: Solo by Christian Marclay
- 2009: Doghouse
- 2011: The Theatre Bizarre
- 2012: Moscow

== Model ==
In 2010 she walked the runway for French designer Charlie Le Mindu at London Fashion Week, where she was completely naked except for her heels and some accessories.

== Mysticism ==
Carr has worked as a professional mystic for various upmarket clients in London, particularly in the fashion scene. Her work in this field earned her a featured in the Evening Standard in 2023.
