= Paula Wilcox =

English actress (born 1949)

- Born: 13 December 1949 (age 76); Manchester, England
- Occupation: Actress
- Years active: 1969–present
- Spouses: Derek Seaton (m. 1970; died 1979); Nelson "Skip" Riddle (m. 1991)

Paula Wilcox (born 13 December 1949) is an English actress. She played Chrissy Plummer in the ITV sitcom Man About the House from 1973 to 1976, and also had roles in TV shows such as The Lovers, Miss Jones and Son, The Queen’s Nose, The Smoking Room, Emmerdale, Mount Pleasant, Boomers, Upstart Crow and Girlfriends. From 2020 to 2023, Wilcox appeared as Elaine Jones in Coronation Street.

== Early life ==
Wilcox was born in Manchester on 13 December 1949 to Joseph and Mary Wilcox.

== Career ==
Wilcox joined the National Youth Theatre aged seventeen. Her early television appearances included a headline role in one episode of the series Hadleigh in 1969. She was then offered her first leading television role in The Lovers, a Granada sitcom produced for the ITV network, largely written by Jack Rosenthal and co-starring Richard Beckinsale. There were two series of The Lovers, plus a feature film. She appeared in an episode of The Benny Hill Show (Thames) broadcast on 23 February 1972.

Wilcox was cast in one of the lead roles of Man About the House (Thames, 1973–1976) as Chrissy Plummer, who was regularly in a flirtatious battle of wits with her male flatmate Robin, played by Richard O'Sullivan. The series ran for six series and the main cast also featured in the spin-off feature film. Her follow-up role was as the eponymous single mother in Miss Jones and Son (1977–1978).

In 1991, Wilcox returned to situation comedy as Ros West in a Yorkshire Television sitcom called Fiddlers Three opposite Peter Davison, before playing the character of Ivy Sandford in the pilot of Frank Skinner's Blue Heaven on Channel 4 in 1992; the show then went on to become a series. She appeared in several series of The Queen’s Nose (1995–2001), and also played small roles in the films The Higher Mortals (1993) and the Woody Allen movie Scoop (2006).

She was cast as Lilian in the BBC Three sitcom The Smoking Room which ran from 2004 to 2005.

On 27 October 2006, Wilcox appeared in the Only Fools and Horses spin-off The Green Green Grass as Marlene's sister. She has also played another character in the Only Fools and Horses universe, appearing in two episodes of Rock and Chips, playing Edward “Grandad” Trotter's estranged wife Violet. In 2007, Wilcox joined the cast of Emmerdale as Hilary Potts, mother of the vicar's wife, Laurel Thomas (Charlotte Bellamy).

In 2008, Wilcox portrayed Bette Davis in a play, Whatever Happened to the Cotton Dress Girl?. In 2010, she portrayed a mother of a gay son in the play Canary.

In November that year, Wilcox took the leading role as a Liverpudlian private eye in Following from the Front, a BBC radio play first broadcast in November 2010 and again in January 2015

Wilcox played Pauline Johnson in the Sky One sitcom series Mount Pleasant from 2011 to 2017.

In addition to her other work, Wilcox has made guest appearances in programmes such as Footballers' Wives, Holby City and Down to Earth.

From 2014 to 2016, she had a starring role in the comedy series Boomers. In 2015, she had a role in an episode of Still Open All Hours.

In 2017, Wilcox filmed series 3 of Upstart Crow, the Shakespearean sitcom starring David Mitchell and penned by Ben Elton.

That year, Wilcox filmed the last episode of Mount Pleasant after seven years.

Wilcox's theatre credits include Chris Hannan's play What Shadows about Enoch Powell's famous "Rivers of Blood" speech on immigration. This was performed at the Birmingham Rep, Edinburgh Lyceum and the Park Theatre, London in 2016 and 2017.

Other theatrical work by Wilcox includes Great Expectations (Vaudeville Theatre); Canary (Liverpool Everyman / Hampstead Theatre); Dreams of Violence (Soho Theatre) and La Cage aux Folles (Playhouse Theatre).

Wilcox has also performed radio and voiceover work, and read the audiobook Three Things About Elsie written by Joanna Cannon.

Wilcox appeared in Coronation Street from 2020 to 2023, playing the role of Elaine Jones, a former abuse victim and first wife of Geoff Metcalfe (Ian Bartholomew) and mother of established character Tim Metcalfe (Joe Duttine). She previously appeared in Coronation Street in 1969 as Ray Langton's sister Janice.

== Personal life ==
Wilcox was married to fellow actor Derek Seaton from 1970 until his death in 1979 from a brain haemorrhage aged 35.

In 1991, Wilcox married Nelson "Skip" Riddle, an American businessman and the eldest son of the composer, bandleader and arranger Nelson Riddle.

== Filmography ==
=== Film ===
Year	Title	Role	Notes
1973	The Lovers!	Beryl Battersby	
1974	Man About the House	Chrissy Plummer	
1993	The Higher Mortals	Miss Bird	
1998	The Stalker's Apprentice	Heather Walwyn	
2006	Scoop	Garden Party Guest	
2007	Outlaw	Iris	Uncredited role
2012	Been Here for Days	Ruth	Short film
2013	Great Expectations	Miss Havisham	
2023	Dead Ed	(unknown)	Short film

=== Television ===
Year	Title	Role	Notes
1969	The Wednesday Play	Linda	Episode: "The Apprentices"
1969	Her Majesty's Pleasure	Jennifer Bottomley	Episode: "All God's Chillun"
1969	Coronation Street	Janice Langton	5 episodes
1969	Z-Cars	Joan	Episodes: "Lost and Found: Parts 1 & 2"
1969	Hadleigh	Lolly	Episode: "Patron of the Arts"
1969, 1970	The Dustbinmen	Naomi	2 episodes
1970	Kate	Rosemary Phelps	Episode: "The Love of Two Women"
1970	Biography	Hilde	Episode: "I Measured the Skies"
1970–1971	The Lovers	Beryl Battersby	Series 1 & 2; all 13 episodes
1971	ITV Sunday Night Drama	Julie	Episode: "Turn of the Year: The Girl Upstairs"
1971	On the House	Beryl Bagley	Episode: "Will the Real Harvey Micklethwaite; Please Stand Up?"
1971	The Onedin Line	Agnes Bascombe	Episode: "Salvage"
1971–1972	The Liver Birds	Gloria Titlark	3 episodes
1972	The Benny Hill Show	Carol Fox	Episode: "Show 12"
1972	Scene	Trish	Episode: "Quiet Afternoon"
1972	Z-Cars	Nancy Roberts	Episode: "Public Relations"
1972	Thirty Minutes Worth	Various characters	Episode: #1.1
1973	Full House	Alice	Episode: #1.12
1973–1976	Man About the House	Chrissy Plummer	Series 1–6; all 39 episodes
1977	The Cost of Loving	Thelma Baynes	Episode: "The Human Element"
1977–1978	Miss Jones and Son	Elizabeth Jones	Series 1 & 2; all 12 episodes
1978	Play for Today	Miss Selby	Episode: "The After-Dinner Joke"
1980	Peter Cook & Co.	Various characters	Television film
1981	Crown Court	Gillian Seymour	Episodes: "Leonora: Parts 1–3"
1984	Let's Parlez Franglais	(unknown)	Episode: #1.6
1985	The Bright Side	Cynthia Bright	All 6 episodes
1985	Mrs. Capper's Birthday	Maureen	Television film
1988	Boon	Dorothy North	Episode: "Topspin"
1991	Fiddlers Three	Ros West	All 14 episodes
1992	Brookside	Angela Heery QC	4 episodes
1993	Casualty	Rosalind Paynter	Episode: "Getting Involved"
1994	Smokescreen	Sara Bean	Mini-series; all 6 episodes
1994	Blue Heaven	Ivy Sandford	All 6 episodes
1995–2001	The Queen's Nose	Audrey Parker	Series 1–5; 24 episodes
1996	Life After Birth	Sylv	All 6 episodes
1996	It Must Be Love	Irene	Television film
1998	The Stalker's Apprentice	Marcus's Mother	Television film
1999	Peak Practice	Amanda Blake	Episode: "Alone"
2002	Footballers' Wives	Marguerite Laslett	3 episodes
2002	Holby City	Helen Johnson	Episode: "Touch and Go"
2004	Merseybeat	Sheila O'Brien	Episode: "Distant Vices"
2004	The Afternoon Play	Kathy Hughes	Episode: "Viva Las Blackpool"
2004	All About Me	Sheila	Episode: "The First Mrs. Craddock"
2004–2005	The Smoking Room	Lillian	Series 1 & 2; all 17 episodes
2005	Down to Earth	Frank's Wife	Episode: "Trouble 'n' Strife"
2005	Murder in Suburbia	Wendy Archer	Episode: "Estate Agents"
2006	Doctors	Selena McKinnon	2 episodes
2006	The Green Green Grass	Pertunia Lane	Episode: "Brothers and Sisters"
2007	Blue Murder	Dr. Pamela Halliwell	Episode: "Desperate Measures"
2007–2008	Emmerdale	Hilary Potts	Regular role; 71 episodes
2007–2010	The Large Family	Linda Large (voice)	Series 1 & 2; all 52 episodes. English version
2008	A Touch of Frost	Gloria Collingham	Episode: "Mind Games"
2010	Moving On	Gail	Episode: "Rules of the Game"
2010, 2011	Rock & Chips	Violet Trotter	2 episodes
2011	Doctors	Sue Gillen	Episode: "Spite Club"
2011–2017	Mount Pleasant	Pauline	Series 1–7; 49 episodes
2014	Jonathan Creek	Hazel Prosser	Episode: "The Letters of Septimus Noone"
2014–2016	Boomers	Carol	Series 1 & 2; all 13 episodes
2015	Still Open All Hours	Linda	Episode: #1.6
2016–2018	Upstart Crow	Mary Shakespeare	Series 1–3; all 21 episodes
2017–2019	Living the Dream	Maureen	Series 1 & 2; 9 episodes
2018	Moving On	Aggie	Episode: "Lost"
2018	Girlfriends	Carole Hardcastle	5 episodes
2020	Grantchester	Diana	Series 5; 4 episodes
2020–2022	Trying	Sandra Ross	Series 1–3; 11 episodes
2020–2023	Coronation Street	Elaine Jones	Regular role; 128 episodes
2024	Avoidance	Shirley	Episode: #2.4
2024	The Cleaner	Sue	Episode: "The Committee"
2026	The Fortune	Linda Blakefield	4 episodes
2026	The Northumbria Mysteries	Lady Philippa Armstrong	Episode: #1.3
