= Elephant's Eggs in a Rhubarb Tree =

1971 British children's TV show

- Genre: Children's
- Written by: Various; Ian Davidson
- Directed by: Robert Reed
- Starring: Ann Beach; Richard Beckinsale; John Gould; David Rowlands; Paul Whitsun-Jones
- Country of origin: United Kingdom
- Original language: English
- No. of series: 1
- No. of episodes: 6

Production
- Producer: Pamela Lonsdale
- Running time: 30 minutes
- Production company: Thames Television

Original release
- Release: 29 March – 3 May 1971

Elephant's Eggs in a Rhubarb Tree is a 1971 British children's television show which featured a variety of poems, songs, and comedy sketches.

== Premise ==
The show featured recitations of works from such writers as T.S Eliot, Hilaire Belloc, and Spike Milligan. The cast of the show would often dress up as the characters in the poems and songs that were being recited.

== Cast ==
- Ann Beach
- Richard Beckinsale
- John Gould
- David Rowlands
- Paul Whitsun-Jones

== Production ==
The series was recorded at Teddington Studios in Studio 2.

== Episodes ==
Three of the six episodes of Elephant's Eggs in a Rhubarb Tree were filmed in black and white due to the Colour Strike in 1971. All six episodes are missing, It is believed they have been wiped somehow.
