= Singles (TV series) =

- Created by: Eric Chappell; Jean Warr
- Starring: Susie Blake; Eamon Boland; Patricia Brake; Simon Cadell; Jane Carr; John Kavanagh; Judy Loe; Gina Maher; Robin Nedwell; Roger Rees; Angela Richards
- Country of origin: United Kingdom
- Original language: English
- No. of series: 3
- No. of episodes: 22

Production
- Running time: 30 minutes (including adverts)
- Production companies: Thames Television (1984); Yorkshire Television (1988, 1989 & 1991)

Original release
- Network: ITV
- Release: 19 June 1984 – 21 August 1991

Singles is a British sitcom set in a singles bar produced by Yorkshire Television (a pilot episode having been produced by Thames Television on 19 June 1984). It aired for three series and 22 episodes on the ITV network between 27 January 1988 and 21 August 1991. Main character Malcolm, played by Roger Rees, was written out in the final series after Rees relocated to the United States with Simon Cadell joining the cast in his place as Dennis Duval.

== Cast ==
Pilot (Thames):

- Patricia Brake as Di
- Jane Carr as Jackie
- John Kavanagh as Clive
- Robin Nedwell as Malcolm
- Angela Richards as Pamela

TV series (Yorkshire):

- Susie Blake as Jackie
- Eamon Boland as Clive
- Simon Cadell as Dennis Duval
- Judy Loe as Pamela
- Gina Maher as Di
- Roger Rees as Malcolm

== Episodes ==
=== Pilot ===
- "Singles' Night" (19 June 1984)

=== Series 1 ===
- "Encounter" (27 January 1988)
- "Foursome" (3 February 1988)
- "Yesterday" (10 February 1988)
- "Money, Money, Money" (17 February 1988)
- "Some Enchanted Evening" (24 February 1988)
- "The Gentle Art" (2 March 1988)
- "False Pretences" (9 March 1988)

=== Series 2 ===
- "Serenade" (23 January 1989)
- "The Charmer" (30 January 1989)
- "Old Flames" (6 February 1989)
- "Dangerous Moonlight" (13 February 1989)
- "Sons and Lovers" (20 February 1989)
- "Family Likeness" (27 February 1989)
- "Cold Feet" (6 March 1989)

=== Series 3 ===
- "Fourth Time Lucky for Dennis Duval?" (10 July 1991)
- "Don't Look Now!" (17 July 1991)
- "Blind Date" (24 July 1991)
- "Name Dropper" (31 July 1991)
- "Flash Back" (7 August 1991)
- "The Loser" (14 August 1991)
- "To Russia with Love" (21 August 1991)
