= Yesterday's Dreams (TV series) =

- Genre: Romantic drama
- Directed by: Ian Sharp
- Country of origin: United Kingdom
- Original language: English
- No. of series: 1
- No. of episodes: 7

Production
- Executive producer: Ted Childs
- Producer: Chris Griffin
- Running time: 60 min.

Original release
- Network: ITV
- Release: 9 January – 20 February 1987

Yesterday's Dreams is a British romantic drama television series produced by Central Television for ITV. The series was written by Peter Gibbs and starred Paul Freeman and Judy Loe. Freeman and Loe play divorced couple Martin and Diane Daniels who rekindle their relationship after Diane begins a temping job at Martin's firm. Much of the series filmed in Tideswell, Derbyshire.

== Synopsis ==
Seven years on from their divorce, Diane and Martin Daniels are living separate lives. Although Martin is at the peak of his career in the aerospace industry, he is coming under increasing pressure at work. Diane and her two teenage children live with her new partner Don, whose garage business is now in the doldrums. When financial problems force Diane to find work, the first company her secretarial agency places her with is Martin's. Inevitably, the two meet. Memories are shared, and old passions are rekindled, leading to painful decisions for everyone involved.

== Cast and characters ==
- Paul Freeman as Martin Daniels
- Judy Loe as Diane Daniels
- Trevor Byfield as Don Ackford
- Patrick Troughton as Jack Daniels
- Damien Lyne as Matthew Daniels
- Frances Atkinson as Kate Daniels
- Ed Devereaux as Gil
- Kate McKenzie as Lynsey
- Hugh Fraser as Dearman
- Valerie Holliman as Sylvie
- Margaret Devlin as Olive
- Thelma Whiteley as Madge

== DVD releases ==
Network released the series on DVD in Region 2.
