= Stella Moray =

British actress (1923–2006)

- Born: 29 July 1923; Ladywood, Birmingham, Warwickshire, England, UK
- Died: 6 August 2006 (aged 83); London, England, UK
- Occupation: Actress

Stella Moray (29 July 1923 – 6 August 2006) was an English character actress who appeared on stage, film and television in dramas, comedies and soap operas.

She seldom headlined on stage but was a stalwart stand-in and understudy, and when she did take over, she did not disappoint. In the early 1980s she excelled as Miss Hannigan in the musical Annie at the Victoria Palace Theatre in London, taking over the role from her friend, actress Sheila Hancock.

Her television credits included parts on such British programmes as Coronation Street, Crossroads, The Bill, Midsomer Murders and George and Mildred. Her final television appearance, at the age of 81, was in April 2005 when she was cast in an episode of the BBC crime drama Judge John Deed. She also appeared as Richard Beckinsale's mother in the 1973 film version of The Lovers.

She was born Stella Ellen Morris at Ladywood, Birmingham, Warwickshire, and was educated locally. Her ambitions to work in the theatre were interrupted by the Second World War, and she joined the ATS.

While stationed at Donnington in Shropshire, Stella appeared in camp concerts as a featured singer in an Ordnance Corps dance band and was spotted by the producer George Black; she toured the Middle and Far East.

In March 1949, she made her first appearance in a musical, as Annie Ogle-Eyes in Belinda Fair at the Saville Theatre. She went on to appear in Frank Loesser's The Most Happy Fella at the Coliseum, and in 1962 she moved to the Savoy Theatre to appear in Noël Coward's breezy Sail Away, where she was also stand-in for the star, Elaine Stritch, in the role of Mimi Paragon.

In 1966 her career faltered when a production of Funny Girl, starring Barbra Streisand and in which she appeared as Mrs. Meeker, closed abruptly at the Prince of Wales Theatre, three months into what should have been a lengthy run. She returned to the West End in 1974 to play the brothel-keeper Madame Blanche in Julian More's musical, Bordello, at the Queen's Theatre.

Stella Moray never married. She died, aged 83, from undisclosed causes.
