= The Lovers (1970 TV series) =

British ITV sitcom 1970–71

- Opening title card
- Genre: Comedy
- Created by: Jack Rosenthal
- Written by: Jack Rosenthal; Geoffrey Lancashire
- Directed by: Michael Apted (series 1); Les Chatfield (series 2)
- Starring: Paula Wilcox; Richard Beckinsale; Robin Nedwell; Joan Scott
- Country of origin: United Kingdom
- Original language: English
- No. of series: 2
- No. of episodes: 13

Production
- Running time: 30 minutes
- Production company: Granada Television

Original release
- Network: ITV
- Release: 27 October 1970 – 18 November 1971

The Lovers is a British television sitcom created and written by Jack Rosenthal, and produced by Granada Television. It stars Richard Beckinsale and Paula Wilcox as Geoffrey and Beryl, a courting couple with conflicting attitudes toward sex and marriage.

ITV transmitted the two-series programme from 1970 to 1971; Channel 4 repeated it in 1996. Rosenthal also wrote a feature film, The Lovers!, which British Lion Film Corporation released in 1973.

== Episodes ==
The Lovers ran for 13 episodes over two series. Michael Apted directed Series 1; Les Chatfield directed Series 2.

=== Series 1 (1970) ===
1. "Sardine Sandwiches" (27 October 1970)
2. "The Date" (3 November 1970)
3. "Freckle Face" (10 November 1970)
4. "Brainwashing" (17 November 1970)
5. "A Pipe and a Moustache" (24 November 1970)
6. "The Truth Game" (1 December 1970)

=== Series 2 (1971) ===
1. "The Engagement" (7 October 1971)
2. "Breaking It Off" (14 October 1971)
3. "Birthday" (21 October 1971)
4. "Joint Bank Account" (28 October 1971)
5. "The Better Homes Exhibition" (4 November 1971)
6. "A Trial Marriage" (11 November 1971)
7. "The Best Laid Plans..." (18 November 1971)

== Characters ==
Geoffrey Scrimshaw
Portrayed by Richard Beckinsale
Geoffrey is a young man in his twenties who embraces the relative sexual freedom of the "permissive society". He is determined to bed Beryl, and has no interest in marriage.
Beryl Battersby
Portrayed by Paula Wilcox
Beryl is a chaste young woman preoccupied with thoughts of marriage. She describes sex as "Percy filth" ("Percy" is a colloquial word for the penis.)
Mrs Battersby
Portrayed by Joan Scott
Mrs Battersby is Beryl's mother.
Roland Lomax
Portrayed by Robin Nedwell

== Feature film ==
Series creator Jack Rosenthal wrote a feature film, The Lovers!, based on the sitcom. Photography began in 1972, some months after the transmission of the second series. Beckinsale, Wilcox, and Scott reprised their roles, with Herbert Wise directing. John Comer and Stella Moray appear as Geoffrey's parents.

British Lion Film Corporation released the film in the UK on 14 May 1973.

== Video releases ==
Network Distributing released The Lovers on Region-2 DVD-Video in 2007. The release includes all 13 episodes from the two series. Network released the feature film on Region-2 DVD in 2013.

== See also ==
- List of films based on British sitcoms

== Sources ==
- Evans, Jeff (2001). The Penguin TV Companion. Harmondsworth: Penguin Books. ISBN 0-14-051467-8.
