= Geoffrey Lancashire =

British television scriptwriter (1933–2004)

- Born: 12 March 1933; Oldham, Lancashire, England
- Died: 3 October 2004 (aged 71)
- Occupations: Television scriptwriter and journalist
- Years active: 1950s–1990
- Spouse: Hilda McCormack (m. 1963)
- Children: 4, including Sarah

Geoffrey Lancashire (12 March 1933 – 3 October 2004) was an English television scriptwriter and journalist.

He is best remembered for writing television comedy series such as The Lovers and The Cuckoo Waltz. He also wrote 171 episodes of ITV soap opera Coronation Street during the 1960s.

== Early life ==
Geoffrey Lancashire was born in Oldham, Lancashire on 12 March 1933 and was educated at the local high school until the age of 15.

== Career ==
Lancashire began his career as a journalist with the Oldham Evening Chronicle newspaper and prior to working in London for national Sunday newspapers, he and fellow journalist Roy Bottomley founded the Oldham Mirror newspaper.

Lancashire was a freelance journalist before joining Granada Television as a continuity scriptwriter days before the company began broadcasting in 1956. He went on to write 171 episodes of Coronation Street, working alongside Tony Warren and Jack Rosenthal. Lancashire also wrote other television series including Inheritance (1967), The Lovers (1970), Shabby Tiger (1973), The Cuckoo Waltz (1975) and Foxy Lady (1982). He had an aptitude for writing and devising television comedy, and with Rosenthal won a Writers' Guild award for The Lovers.

Having become self-employed once again, Lancashire wrote for other television companies. His output included contributions to the BBC's 1965-67 United!, Man at the Top (Thames Television, 1970–72) and All Creatures Great and Small (BBC, 1978–1990).

== Personal life ==
In February 1963, Lancashire married Hilda McCormack, a secretary at the Granada Television studios. He suffered a series of strokes late in his life. He never fully recovered and lived at Denville Hall, a nursing home for people from the television and theatrical professions. He died at Watford General Hospital on 3 October 2004 and was survived by Hilda, (Note: Some source say that Geoffrey Lancashire and Hilda had divorced, but others say there had been difficulties in the marriage which were resolved.) his actor daughter Sarah and her twin brother, and two other sons.
