= The Cuckoo Waltz =

- Genre: Sitcom
- Created by: Geoffrey Lancashire
- Starring: Diane Keen; David Roper; Lewis Collins
- Country of origin: United Kingdom
- Original language: English
- No. of series: 4
- No. of episodes: 26

Production
- Running time: 26 minutes
- Production company: Granada Television

Original release
- Network: ITV
- Release: 27 October 1975 – 7 August 1980

The Cuckoo Waltz is a British television sitcom produced by Granada Television for the ITV network between 27 October 1975 and 7 August 1980. It was written by Geoffrey Lancashire, and produced and directed by Bill Gilmour.

The series, which was set in 1970s and early 1980s Manchester, dealt with the comic complications that ensue when impoverished newly-weds Chris and Fliss Hawthorne (David Roper and Diane Keen) take in lodger Gavin Rumsey (Lewis Collins) to ease their financial problems. Collins left after three series and was replaced by Ian Saynor as Adrian Lockett in the fourth series.

The series was re-screened by now defunct satellite TV channel Granada Plus in the late 1990s and early to mid-2000s. Since 2024, it has been shown by Rewind TV, along with other Granada sitcoms such as Surgical Spirit and Watching.

== Cast ==
- Diane Keen as Fliss Hawthorne
- David Roper as Chris Hawthorne
- Lewis Collins as Gavin Rumsey (series 1-3)
- Clare Kelly as Connie Wagstaffe
- John McKelvey as Austen Tweedale
- Ian Saynor as Adrian Lockett (from series 4)

== Episodes ==
=== Series 1 (1975) ===
- Cuckoo in the Nest (27 October 1975)
- One Week Later (3 November 1975)
- Paying Your Way (10 November 1975)
- The Anniversary (17 November 1975)
- A Day Off (24 November 1975)
- Fleet Street (1 December 1975)
- House for Sale (8 December 1975)

=== Series 2 (1976) ===
- Babysitter (8 July 1976)
- Financial Difficulties (15 July 1976)
- The Armchair (22 July 1976)
- Connie (29 July 1976)
- The Model (5 August 1976)
- The Letter (12 August 1976)

=== Series 3 (1977) ===
- It's All Greek to Me (10 January 1977)
- The Treat (17 January 1977)
- The Air Hostesses (24 January 1977)
- The Policeman (31 January 1977)
- Perspectives (7 February 1977)
- Alterations (14 February 1977)

=== Series 4 (1980) ===
- The New Lodger (26 June 1980)
- The Neighbour (3 July 1980)
- Leather (10 July 1980)
- A Love That Does Not Dim (17 July 1980)
- Guess Who's Coming to Dinner? (24 July 1980)
- The Press Ball (31 July 1980)
- An Ideal Home (7 August 1980)

== DVD release ==
All four series of The Cuckoo Waltz have been released on DVD in May 2009 and August 2011, and a box set with the complete series to follow.

DVD	Release date
The Complete Series 1	4 May 2009
The Complete Series 2	10 August 2009
The Complete Series 3	21 March 2011
The Complete Series 4	22 August 2011
The Complete Series 1 to 4 Box Set	3 December 2012
