= The Donati Conspiracy =

1973 British television series

The Donati Conspiracy is a three-part BBC TV drama from 1973.

It is set in Britain in the near future, which is ruled by an authoritarian regime, but there is a resistance carrying out terror attacks, e.g. bombing water fluoridation plants.

Actors included Richard Beckinsale as an alleged terrorist, Windsor Davies as his father, Anthony Valentine as a government security official, Michael Aldridge as the eponymous Professor Donati, John Ringham as a lawyer, and James Copeland as a priest. Slightly unusually for the time, one of the leading characters was a wheelchair user, played by Janet Key.

It was written by John Gould.

It is available on Internet Archive.
