= Foxy Lady (TV series) =

British TV comedy series (1982–1984)

- Genre: Comedy
- Written by: Geoffrey Lancashire
- Directed by: Richard Holthouse
- Starring: Diane Keen; Geoffrey Burridge; Gregor Fisher; Alan David; Patrick Troughton
- Country of origin: United Kingdom
- Original language: English
- No. of series: 2
- No. of episodes: 12

Production
- Running time: 30 minutes
- Production company: Granada Television

Original release
- Network: ITV
- Release: 25 October 1982 – 29 February 1984

Foxy Lady was a television comedy series made between October 1982 and February 1984 by Granada Television. It was set in the 1960s and revolved around a young female reporter, Daisy Jackson (played by Diane Keen), who worked for a newspaper and encountered sexism from her colleagues.
