= Janet Key =

British actress (1945–1992)

- Key in Percy (1971)
- Born: 10 July 1945; Bath, Somerset, England
- Died: 26 July 1992 (aged 47); London, England
- Occupation: Actress
- Years active: 1960s–1992
- Spouse: Gawn Grainger (m. 1970)
- Children: 2

Janet Key (10 July 1945 – 26 July 1992) was an English actress with a varied career in theatre, film and television from the late 1960s until her death.

== Career ==
Key was born in Bath, Somerset, and trained at the nearby Bristol Old Vic Theatre School. Her stage career included stints with the National Theatre and the Royal Shakespeare Company, alongside touring and fringe productions. Between 1970 and 1975 Key appeared in four horror films, as well as the sex comedy Percy and the historical drama Lady Caroline Lamb. Her only other cinema appearance came later in Nineteen Eighty-Four, although she also featured in several made-for-TV dramas, including the role of Charmian in the Jonathan Miller production of Antony and Cleopatra for the ambitious BBC Television Shakespeare project. Key became a familiar face on British television through many guest appearances in a wide variety of popular series ranging from crime and espionage through to comedy.

== Personal life ==
Key married actor Gawn Grainger in 1970. The couple had two children. Key died of cancer on 26 July 1992, aged 47. In 1994, Grainger married actress Zoë Wanamaker, who had been an acquaintance of Key's.

An obituary by Sebastian Graham-Jones in The Independent said: "Janet Key was an actress of particular versatility. She was a high-spirited beauty with an acerbic style and talent that were entirely her own."

== Filmography ==
- 1970: The Vampire Lovers – Gretchin
- 1971: Percy – Hazel Anthony
- 1972: Dracula A.D. 1972 – Anna
- 1972: Lady Caroline Lamb – Miss Fairfax
- 1973: And Now the Screaming Starts! – Bridget
- 1975: I Don't Want to Be Born – Jill Fletcher
- 1984: Nineteen Eighty-Four – The Instructress

== Television appearances ==
- 1967–1968: The Wednesday Play – Honeymoon wife / Rosalind
- 1968: The Tenant of Wildfell Hall – Millicent Hargrave
- 1969: Department S – Jean
- 1970: Paul Temple – Christi
- 1971: Trial - Barbara Crawford
- 1972: The Adventurer – Virginia
- 1972: Jason King – Elaine
- 1972: Man at the Top – Dr. Helen Reid
- 1973: New Scotland Yard – Jean Rossen
- 1973: Thriller – Lisa
- 1973: Murder Must Advertise - Ethel Vavasour
- 1973: The Donati Conspiracy - Jane Frederick
- 1974: Napoleon and Love – Louise Compoint
- 1974: Special Branch – Carla
- 1974: Sutherland's Law – Julie McKenna
- 1975: State of Emergency – Jane Frederick
- 1975: The Sweeney – Kate Regan
- 1976: The Crezz – Brenda Pitman
- 1979: Shoestring – Val Colefax
- 1980: The Enigma Files – Pam Knowland
- 1980: Minder – Gloria Brompton
- 1981: BBC Television Shakespeare – Charmian
- 1983: No Problem! – Kay Angel
- 1986: Never the Twain – Charlotte
- 1986: Taggart – Joyce Meacher
- 1988: Worlds Beyond – Lady Lucinda
- 1990: Making News – Rowena Lyle
