= Ian Saynor =

British film and television actor

Ian Saynor is a British film and television actor. He has appeared in various TV dramas set in Wales, including the film The Corn is Green, in which he played the major role of Morgan. He also appeared in episodes of The District Nurse, but is best known for playing Merak in the 1979 Doctor Who serial The Armageddon Factor. Ian also played Adrian in the Granada Television sitcom The Cuckoo Waltz. He is well known in and around Wales having worked for various production companies, notably S4C, BBC (including BBC Wales and BBC South), and has been involved in many stage productions, mostly in Cardiff and London. He lives in the Cotswolds and continues to act.

In the 2018 bilingual drama series Hidden, Saynor played the father of lead detective Cadi John.
