= Miss Jones and Son =

- Opening title
- Genre: Sitcom
- Created by: Richard Waring
- Starring: Paula Wilcox; Christopher Beeny
- Music by: Roger Webb
- Country of origin: United Kingdom
- No. of series: 2
- No. of episodes: 12

Production
- Producer: Peter Frazer-Jones
- Running time: 30 minutes
- Production company: Thames Television

Original release
- Network: ITV
- Release: 18 April 1977 – 13 February 1978

Miss Jones and Son is a comedy series first broadcast on ITV in 1977 starring Paula Wilcox, Christopher Beeny, Charlotte Mitchell and Norman Bird. It was written by Richard Waring and produced and directed by Peter Frazer-Jones. Roger Webb wrote the theme song, "Bright Idea" (from the DeWolfe production-music album Awakening.

== Premise ==
The series depicts the life of Elizabeth Jones (Paula Wilcox), a young woman coming to terms with the responsibility of looking after her baby, Rolland 'Rollie' Jones, as a single parent. Neighbour and friend Geoffrey (Christopher Beeny) provides emotional support. Difficulties included the reproaches of her parents (played by Charlotte Mitchell and Norman Bird), a difficult social life and a reduced income.

An American version titled Miss Winslow and Son aired for six episodes on CBS in 1979.

== Episodes ==
Series One (1977)

1. "From Here to Maternity" (18 April 1977)
2. "Baby Talk" (25 April 1977)
3. "A Kid for Three Fathers" (2 May 1977)
4. "For What We Are Not About to Receive" (16 May 1977)
5. "Baptism Under Fire" (23 May 1977)
6. "And Father Came Too" (30 May 1977)

Series Two (1978)

1. "More Fish in the Sea" (9 January 1978)
2. "A Theme in Two Flats" (16 January 1978)
3. "Will You Be My Wife" (23 January 1978)
4. "Jobs for the Girls" (30 January 1978)
5. "Just Good Friends" (6 February 1978)
6. "Four Part Harmony" (13 February 1978)

== Cast list ==
Actor	Character
Paula Wilcox	Elizabeth Jones
Norman Bird	Mr. Jones
Christopher Beeny	Geoffrey
Charlotte Mitchell	Mrs. Jones
Joan Scott	Mrs. Jones
Cass Allen	Rose Tucker
David Savile	David
Luke Steensil	Roly Jones
Catherine Kirkwood	Penny

== DVD release ==
The complete series of Miss Jones and Son was released on DVD in the UK.

== See also ==
- British sitcom
