= The Corn Is Green (1979 film) =

1979 television film by George Cukor

- The video box for the film.
- Genre: Drama
- Based on: The Corn Is Green; 1938 play by Emlyn Williams
- Written by: Ivan Davis
- Directed by: George Cukor
- Starring: Katharine Hepburn
- Music by: John Barry
- Country of origin: United States
- Original language: English

Production
- Producers: Neil Hartley
- Production location: Wales
- Cinematography: Edward Scaife
- Editors: Richard Marden; John Wright
- Running time: 93 minutes
- Production company: Warner Bros. Television

Original release
- Network: CBS
- Release: January 29, 1979

The Corn Is Green is a 1979 American made-for-television drama film starring Katharine Hepburn as a schoolteacher determined to bring education to a Welsh coal mining town, despite great opposition. It was directed by George Cukor, the tenth and last collaboration on film between the director and the actress, and is the second and last made-for-television film directed by Cukor. The filming was done in Wales. It was adapted from the 1938 play of the same name by Emlyn Williams, and had previously been filmed in 1945 with Bette Davis in the main role.

The film was telecast by CBS on January 29, 1979. It received two Emmy nominations, including Outstanding Lead Actress in a Limited Series or a Special for Katharine Hepburn. It also aired on HBO in June 1983.

== Plot ==
Middle-aged Lilly Moffatt (Katharine Hepburn) sets up a school in a Welsh coal mining town, despite the determined opposition of the local squire (Bill Fraser). Eventually, she considers giving up. Then she discovers a promising student Morgan Evans (Ian Saynor), a miner seemingly destined for a life of hard work and heavy drink. With renewed hope, she works hard to help him realise his potential.

Morgan gets the opportunity to take an examination for Oxford University with, hopefully, a prized scholarship. Moffatt, the rest of the teachers, and their students are hopeful Morgan will pass the Oxford interview, and so he does.

However, Bessie Watty (Toyah Willcox), a young woman who has recently given birth to Morgan's child, blackmails the faculty into giving her part of Morgan's scholarship money in order to help raise the baby. The conniving young woman has designs on another male suitor. Instead, Moffatt volunteers to adopt the child so that Morgan's academic future will not be ruined and Watty will be free to marry another man, unfettered by her responsibility to the child (since she and her affianced never really cared for it in the first place). Morgan quickly hears about Watty's scandalous, self-serving motives, and insists upon marrying Watty and throwing away his big chance to go to Oxford. Through a heartfelt and persuasive conversation, Moffatt offers to care for the baby and convinces the young man to continue his higher education and contribute something to the world. Morgan realizes she is right, and also, that he will be a better father to his son when he is graduated from Oxford.

== Cast ==
- Katharine Hepburn as Miss Lilly Moffat
- Ian Saynor as Morgan Evans
- Bill Fraser as The Squire
- Patricia Hayes as Mrs. Watty
- Anna Massey as Miss Ronberry
- Artro Morris as John Goronwy Jones
- Dorothea Phillips as Sarah Pugh
- Toyah Willcox as Bessie Watty (as Toyah Wilcox)
- Huw Richards as Idwal
- Bryn Fon as Robbart
- Dyfon Roberts as Gwyn
- Robbin John as Ivor (as Robin John)

== See also ==
- List of American films of 1979
