= Richard Beckinsale =

English actor (1947–1979)

- Beckinsale as Lennie Godber in Porridge
- Born: Richard Arthur Beckinsale; 6 July 1947; Carlton, Nottinghamshire, England
- Died: 19 March 1979 (aged 31); Sunningdale, Berkshire, England
- Resting place: Mortlake Crematorium, Kew, London, England
- Occupation: Actor
- Years active: 1962–1979
- Spouses: Margaret Bradley (m. 1965; div. 1971); Judy Loe (m. 1977)
- Children: Samantha; Kate

Richard Arthur Beckinsale (6 July 1947 – 19 March 1979) was an English actor. He played Lennie Godber in the BBC sitcoms Porridge and Going Straight, and Alan Moore in the ITV sitcom Rising Damp. He was the father of actresses Samantha and Kate Beckinsale.

== Early life ==
Beckinsale was born in Carlton, Nottinghamshire, the youngest of three children, to an Anglo-Burmese father, Arthur John Beckinsale, and an English mother, Maggie Barlow. Beckinsale stated in 1977 that he might have been a distant relative of the actor Charles Laughton.

While attending College House Junior School in Chilwell, Beckinsale appeared in his first of many school plays, playing Dopey in Snow White and the Seven Dwarfs. As a teenager at Alderman White Secondary Modern School, he played the lead in Tobias and the Angel and also appeared as Hsieh Ping-Kuei in Lady Precious Stream, which earned him a positive review in the Nottingham Evening Post. Beckinsale left school at 15 with ambitions to become a professional actor but he was still too young to go to drama school. He spent a year working in numerous manual labour jobs, including spells as an upholsterer's apprentice, a pipe inspector, and an assistant in a grocery business.

At 16, Beckinsale enrolled at Clarendon College (later part of Nottingham College) taking the drama teacher's training programme and spent the next two years there, until he was old enough to apply to the Royal Academy of Dramatic Art. After failing his first audition for RADA, Beckinsale was accepted on his second attempt, becoming just one of 31 successful applicants from a total of more than 12,500. While at RADA, Beckinsale won a prize for comedy.

After graduating in 1968, he moved to Crewe to begin in repertory theatre. He also appeared in various other repertory productions around the country, including Hull, Leeds, London and Colchester. While at Crewe, Beckinsale played such roles as the Scarecrow in The Wizard of Oz, Sir Andrew Aguecheek in Twelfth Night, and the title role in Shakespeare's Hamlet. Following his stint in 1969 playing Hamlet, Beckinsale took a brief hiatus from acting and worked at a bottle factory, before returning to acting soon after.

== Career ==
=== First television appearances ===
Beckinsale made his television debut in 1969 as a police officer in Coronation Street, in which he had to arrest veteran character Ena Sharples. He later had a small role in a 1970 episode of A Family at War, playing a young soldier.

=== The Lovers ===
After being recommended by several other actors for the part, Beckinsale landed his first starring role as Geoffrey in the sitcom The Lovers (1970–71), opposite fellow newcomer Paula Wilcox. The show put both leading performers in the eye of the public and a film version was made in 1973 with both Beckinsale and Wilcox reprising their roles.

=== The Donati Conspiracy ===
In 1973, slightly unusually, he had an important straight acting role in The Donati Conspiracy, as Robert Sadler, an alleged terrorist sentenced to death for killing a security guard.

=== Porridge ===
From 1974 to 1977, Beckinsale starred as prison inmate Lennie Godber alongside Ronnie Barker in the hit BBC sitcom Porridge. Beckinsale expressed relief at landing the role, owing to his concern about being typecast as Geoffrey from The Lovers. Barker had suggested actor Paul Henry for the role of Godber, owing to Henry being from Birmingham (as Godber was meant to be), but director Sydney Lotterby chose Beckinsale instead. Beckinsale initially played Godber with a Birmingham accent, but this was eventually abandoned. Actor Brian Glover, who played the character Cyril Heslop on Porridge, stated that Heslop's line "I read a book once; green it was" from the first episode, "New Faces, Old Hands", was actually Beckinsale's idea.

=== Rising Damp ===
While appearing in Porridge on the BBC, Beckinsale simultaneously starred as naive medical student Alan Moore in the ITV sitcom Rising Damp also from 1974 to 1977. Beckinsale was the only member of the cast not to have appeared in The Banana Box, the play on which Rising Damp was based. Writer Eric Chappell stated: "Although not the oldest, he was the most experienced sitcom actor of the quartet, having already appeared in The Lovers and Porridge. This allowed him to be something of a calming influence on the show – a calming influence that was often needed." Beckinsale had previously worked with Leonard Rossiter in the 1974 Johnny Speight drama If There Weren't Any Blacks You'd Have To Invent Them. Because of a scheduling conflict with the musical I Love My Wife, in which he was starring, Beckinsale was unable to appear in the fourth series of Rising Damp.

=== Going Straight ===
In 1977, Porridge was brought to an end with his character of Godber being released from his prison sentence in the final episode. He subsequently starred alongside Barker in Going Straight (1978), a spin-off of Porridge in which the two criminal characters are seen on the outside rebuilding their lives. Tentative plans for further episodes of the spin-off were shelved due to Beckinsale's death in 1979.

=== Bloomers ===
Beckinsale starred in his final television comedy, Bloomers, the five completed episodes of which eventually aired in September and October 1979 on BBC 2. He played Stan, an out-of-work actor who takes a job as a partner at a flower shop. This was his first leading role in a sitcom.

=== Other work ===
In between series one and two of The Lovers Beckinsale starred in an ITV children's show titled Elephant's Eggs in a Rhubarb Tree. The show featured jokes, poetry, and music.

He had the lead role of a young detective in the 1971 Armchair Theatre episode Detective Waiting.

Beckinsale appeared in the films Rentadick (1972) and Three for All (1975) and made appearances in several other television series such as the Stephen Frears-directed ITV Playhouse episode "Last Summer" in 1977.

Throughout his TV series run, Beckinsale also did a 19-month run in the West End play Funny Peculiar, for which he was nominated for the Laurence Olivier Award for "Actor of the Year in a New Play" and "Comedy Performance of the Year." He later did a six-month run in the London debut of the Cy Coleman and Michael Stewart musical I Love My Wife.

Shortly after his 30th birthday, Beckinsale was the subject of an episode of This Is Your Life. Ronnie Barker and Fulton MacKay of Porridge, Leonard Rossiter and Don Warrington of Rising Damp, and Paula Wilcox of The Lovers all gave tributes during the show.

In 1977, he starred in a radio comedy series called Albert and Me with Pat Coombs and John Comer. He also appeared in an advertisement for Asda which aired in 1978 and early 1979. Beckinsale appeared in the film version of Porridge released in 1979. It was to be his last and only completed work of the year.

In October 1980, Frederick Muller Ltd. posthumously published a volume of Beckinsale's poetry entitled "With Love" (ISBN 0-584-10387-5).

== Personal life ==
Beckinsale was married twice. In 1965, he married his pregnant girlfriend, a local Nottingham woman named Margaret Bradley, whom he had met in 1964 while singing at a folk club. Their daughter, actress Samantha Beckinsale, was born on 23 July 1966. When Beckinsale was accepted into RADA, they moved to London. Beckinsale became immersed in student life and he and his wife grew apart. They separated in 1968 when Margaret took Samantha back to live in Nottingham and Beckinsale left London to work in repertory in Crewe. They divorced in 1971 and Beckinsale did not see his daughter for years. Margaret later remarried and her new husband raised Samantha as his daughter. Samantha was unaware that her biological father was Beckinsale until she was 11. Beckinsale and Samantha reconnected soon after and spent time together before his death in 1979.

Beckinsale met actress Judy Loe in 1968 at Crewe repertory. They soon began dating and lived together for years. Their daughter, actress Kate Beckinsale, was born on 26 July 1973. They married in 1977.

Beckinsale enjoyed playing the guitar and singing, and he performed in folk clubs in Nottingham as a teenager. He also enjoyed playing football and often played in charity matches with the Entertainers XI team. He was a fan of Manchester United.

Beckinsale stated that towards the end of his 19 month run with the play Funny Peculiar, he took Valium and had several instances of having to start the play over again due to overwork and mental strain. Beckinsale's widow, Loe, stated that he suffered from occasional panic attacks.

Although Beckinsale was pleased with the success of the sitcoms he starred in, he expressed a desire to play more serious roles as he got older.

== Death ==
Beckinsale worked on the BBC sitcom Bloomers, five episodes of which were filmed prior to Christmas 1978. According to his Bloomers co-star Anna Calder-Marshall, during the recording of the first episode, he told her he had suffered some kind of blackout and had some dizzy spells. This concerned him enough to make an appointment to see a doctor, but the doctor could not find anything wrong apart from an overactive stomach lining and slightly high cholesterol. As filming on the series progressed, Beckinsale appeared increasingly tired and "greyer and greyer", according to co-star David Swift. Because of an industrial dispute at the BBC in late December 1978, the filming of the sixth episode of Bloomers had to be postponed until March.

In January 1979, to meet the requirements for a film production's insurance policy, Beckinsale underwent a full medical examination in which his heart, lungs, breathing, and blood pressure were checked. He spent January and February 1979 working on Porridge and then prepared to start work on Bloody Kids in March.

A week before he died, Beckinsale complained to his wife Judy Loe of feeling unwell and said he was unable to take her to hospital where she was due for an operation to increase the couple's chances of having another child. At the time, they both put Beckinsale's sense of not being well down to nerves. Loe underwent the operation on Wednesday 14 March and while she remained in the hospital recuperating, Beckinsale continued to work on Bloody Kids and also resumed work on the 6th episode of Bloomers, commuting between London by day and Southend-on-Sea by night.

On the evening of Saturday, 17 March, he attended a farewell party for The Two Ronnies, whose protagonists were about to leave for Australia. According to David Jason, who was at the party, Beckinsale left the party at around 11:30, in order to attend another friend's party. Jo Apted, wife of The Lovers director Michael Apted, stated that Beckinsale attended a party at her house on Saturday night and felt unwell the next day. On Sunday 18 March, he worked on Bloomers and gave Anna Calder-Marshall a lift home afterwards. To her surprise, he began to talk about his fear of dying and of being alone in the house. He then took his five-year-old daughter Kate to visit Loe in the hospital. Upon leaving the hospital, Beckinsale dropped his daughter off with relatives to spend the night. Afterwards, he returned to his house in Sunningdale, Berkshire. At some point that day, he called his older daughter Samantha and made plans to spend some time with her the following weekend. Before going to bed, he telephoned a couple of friends, and, during the conversation, he repeated that he had been feeling unwell, and also said that he had some pain in his chest and arms. He seemed in good humour, however, and made a joke of it.

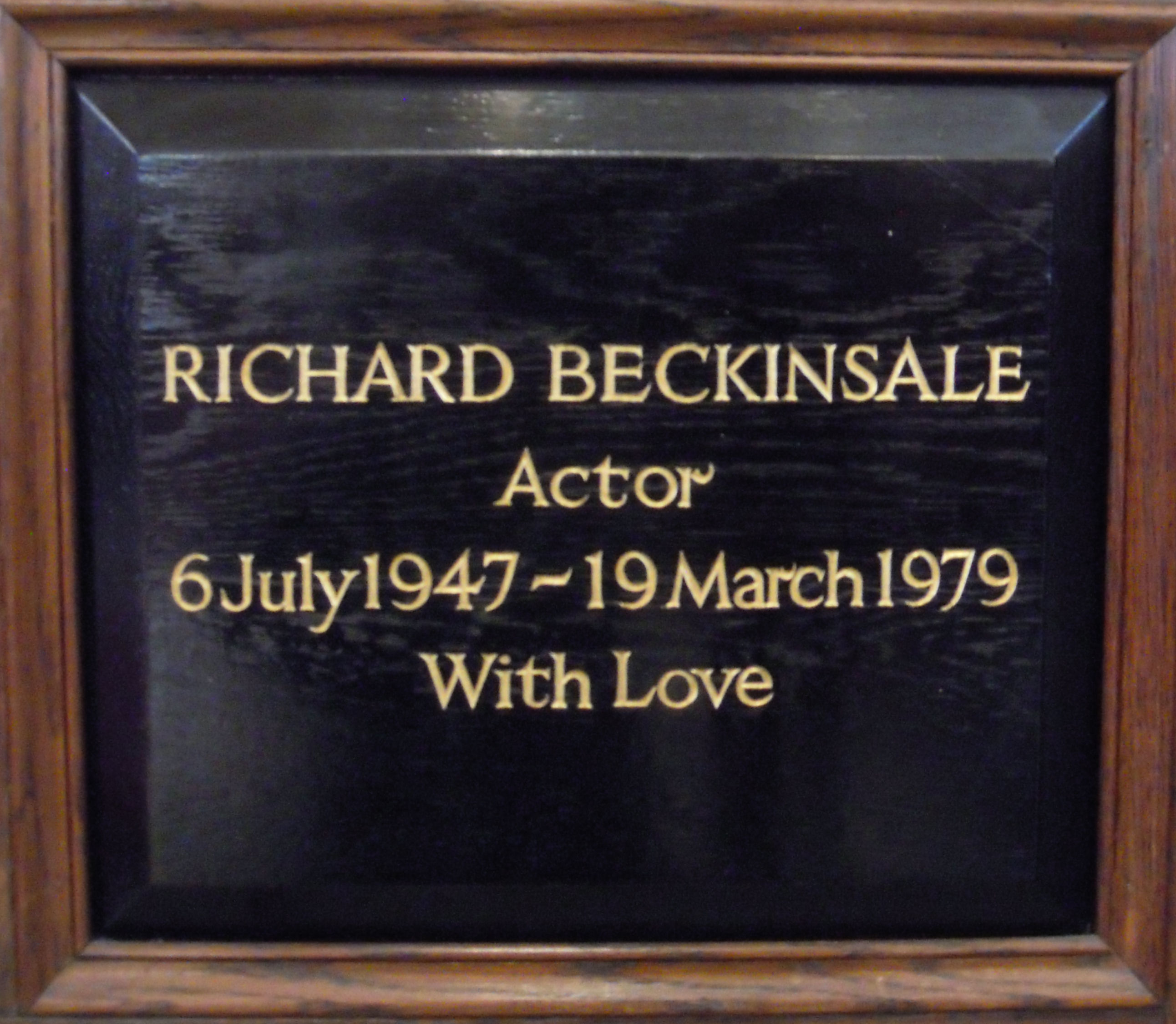
Beckinsale's memorial plaque in St Paul's in Covent Garden

When he did not arrive at the rehearsal for the 6th and final episode of Bloomers the next morning, a member of the production team rang his house, and the phone was answered by family friend Rosana Bradley, who had been staying at the house to help take care of Kate, but had not been there the previous night. She said Beckinsale was still sleeping, and she left the phone to wake him up. When she returned, she said that she was unable to wake him, and was advised to call a doctor. Shortly after, it was confirmed that he had died during the night of what appeared to have been a massive heart attack.

The post-mortem examination revealed that a coronary artery disease caused the heart attack. Beckinsale had expressed worries about his cholesterol to friend Stephen Frears over dinner just days earlier, but he seemed healthy and fit and had no cardiac problems in his medical records. According to Frears, Beckinsale's high cholesterol may have been a factor in his early death.

Beckinsale's death was met with great shock. Rising Damp co-star Frances de la Tour stated: "It is such a shock that someone as young and obviously fit as him should die so suddenly. The last time I saw him he had given up smoking; not that he smoked very much, anyway. He was always concerned about keeping fit and we used to tease him about it. He used to play a lot of charity football, but the terrible thing is that he was a family man. I am most distressed for his family." The Lovers creator Jack Rosenthal stated: "He must have had one of the biggest futures any actor could hope for. He was a very honest boy and he had that same quality in his acting."

Beckinsale was cremated during a private service in Bracknell, Berkshire, and his remains were then taken to Mortlake Crematorium. Although Beckinsale left more than £65,000 (equivalent to £320,000 in 2025) in his will, only approximately £18,000 was left after taxes and other costs. On 19 April 1979, one month after his death, more than three hundred people attended a memorial service at the actors' church St Paul's in Covent Garden. Leonard Rossiter, Fulton MacKay, Richard Briers, and Porridge writers Dick Clement and Ian La Frenais gave tributes during the service. La Frenais stated: "I was always amazed by Richard's talent. I'm convinced he would have become an international actor." Briers said: "The character of Lennie Godber had a kind of innocence which was a danger but also a kind of protection against prison life. Richard had a similar innocence. It made him vulnerable but he was never one for upstaging, scene-stealing and the kind of action which substituted technique for truth. Richard made us laugh and also charmed us. He was an effortless charmer." Beckinsale's widow, Judy, stated: "It was a celebration, not a memorial service." A memorial plaque was later placed in the church in Beckinsale's honour.

== Unfinished work ==
At the time of his death, Beckinsale had almost completed the BBC sitcom Bloomers. Writer James Saunders's original script reveals that Beckinsale was due to attend the sixth and last rehearsal for the final episode of the series on the day he died, with the show to be recorded the following day. The five completed Bloomers episodes were aired later in the year.

Plans had been drawn up to make a film version of Rising Damp and ultimately the film was made in 1980. Christopher Strauli was recruited to replace Beckinsale, playing a different character.

He was also in the middle of making a television film, Bloody Kids, which then had to be re-cast. This role marked a change in direction for Beckinsale, playing a hard-nosed detective character in contrast to the naive characters he had played before. Although Beckinsale does not noticeably appear in the film, director Stephen Frears stated that there are a small number of scenes in which Beckinsale is just off camera, as well as a scene in which he is in a car, although indistinguishable to the viewer. Some of the footage of Beckinsale, which could not be included in the film, was shown during the 2000 ITV tribute, The Unforgettable Richard Beckinsale, as well as the 2016 ITV3 documentary, Rising Damp Forever. One scene showed Beckinsale questioning a character in the film with a tough stance, and looking quite different than his usual appearance with much shorter cropped hair.

== Legacy and tributes ==
Three days after Beckinsale's death, Going Straight won a BAFTA award. A clearly shaken and upset Ronnie Barker delivered a brief acceptance speech in tribute to his co-star. Beckinsale holds the distinction of having starred in three different sitcoms, each of which won the BAFTA for Best Situation Comedy, in three successive years: Porridge in 1977, Rising Damp in 1978, and Going Straight in 1979.

When Beckinsale's book of poetry, With Love was published in 1980, Judy Loe, Ronnie Barker, and Richard Briers appeared on The Russell Harty Show to talk about the book and recite some of the poetry.

In 2000, 21 years after his death, a documentary was broadcast on ITV in tribute, called The Unforgettable Richard Beckinsale. It featured interviews with his widow, the actress Judy Loe, as well as his father, sister, closest school friend and two daughters. Also contributing were his co-stars, Ronnie Barker of Porridge and Don Warrington of Rising Damp. Barker, remembering Beckinsale's premature death, said: "He was so loved. He hadn't done much but he was so loved that there was a universal sort of grief that went on."

In the 2006 film Venus, during a scene inside the actors' church, St Paul's, Peter O'Toole's character, an aging actor, points out Beckinsale's plaque, as an example of an actor who died in his prime.

In 2007, Alan Davies nominated Beckinsale as his chosen subject for the BBC Radio 4 series Great Lives. Judy Loe and Stephen Frears participated in the discussion of Beckinsale's life and career.

A biography of Beckinsale, titled The Richard Beckinsale Story was published in 2008 by author David Clayton. It featured interviews with family, friends, and co-workers of Beckinsale's.

In 2013, a blue plaque in Beckinsale's memory was unveiled at his former school, College House Junior School in Chilwell. Kate Beckinsale, Judy Loe, David Walliams, and Michael Sheen attended the ceremony.

UK Gold aired a three-part documentary in 2014 called Porridge: Inside Out, in celebration of Porridge's 40th anniversary. During this series, there was a memorial segment dedicated to Beckinsale, in which Judy Loe and Kate Beckinsale took part.

ITV3 aired a two-part documentary in 2016 called Rising Damp Forever which looked back at the making of Rising Damp. There was a memorial segment for Beckinsale during the series in which his daughters, Samantha and Kate took part.

In 2018, as part of an art project in Beckinsale's former hometown of Beeston, a mural of him was commissioned by the town council and painted by the French street artist, Zabou.

Rising Damp co-star Frances de la Tour said of Beckinsale's acting ability: "Richard was a brilliant young actor as so many have testified. His comedy was based on the truth. That is what people mean by 'timing.' So we believed him at all times. There is no greater testament. Ronnie Barker was similar, which is why they worked so well and movingly together."

== Filmography ==
=== Film ===
Year	Title	Role	Notes
1972	Rentadick	Hobbs	
1973	The Lovers!	Geoffrey Scrimshaw	
1975	Three for All	Jet Bone	
1979	Porridge	Lennie	Posthumous release

=== Television ===
Year	Title	Role	Notes
1969	Coronation Street	PC Wilcox	1 episode
1970	A Family at War	Private Grey	Episode: "The Breach in the Dyke"
1970–1971	The Lovers	Geoffrey Scrimshaw	Series regular
1971	Elephant's Eggs in a Rhubarb Tree	Various roles	Series regular
1971	Armchair Theatre	Lewis	Episode: "Detective Waiting"
1971	Justice	Terry Watson	Episode: "No Flowers, by Request"
1971	ITV Sunday Night Theatre	Pete	Episode: "Tales of Piccadilly: A Room Full of Holes"
1972	ITV Sunday Night Theatre	Dermot	Episode: "Consequences"
1972	ITV Sunday Night Theatre	Angus MacFee	Episode: "Madly in Love"
1973	The Rivals of Sherlock Holmes	Richard Frobisher	Episode: "The Mysterious Death on the Underground Railway"
1973	The Donati Conspiracy	Robert Sadler	3 episodes
1974	If There Weren't Any Blacks You'd Have to Invent Them	The Young Man	TV film
1974–1977	Porridge	Lennie Godber	Series regular
1974–1977	Rising Damp	Alan Moore	Series regular
1975	Play for Today	Michael Robson	Episode: "The Floater"
1976	Couples	Daniel Graham	Recurring role
1977	ITV Playhouse	Johnny	Episode: "Last Summer"
1978	Going Straight	Lennie Godber	Series regular
1979	Bloomers	Stan	Aired posthumously
