= Peter Blake (actor) =

Scottish actor (1948–2018)

- Born: John Beattie Dempsey; 8 December 1948; Selkirk, Scotland
- Died: 21 July 2018 (aged 69); France
- Occupation: Actor
- Years active: 1967–2012

Peter Blake (born John Beattie Dempsey; 8 December 1948 – 21 July 2018) was a Scottish actor and singer. Probably best known as the character Kirk St Moritz in the BBC sitcom Dear John, by John Sullivan, his other high-profile moments came through his playing of a 'Fonz'-type character in Pepsi-Cola commercials which led to a hit record in 1977 "Lipsmackin' Rock 'n' Rollin", Andy Evol the disc-jockey in Agony with Maureen Lipman for LWT and in an episode of Taggart ("Do or Die") as Sgt. Bill Kent. He also had a long association with The Rocky Horror Show playing Frank-N-Furter over a thousand times between 1975 and 1994.

== Early life ==
Peter Blake was born John Beattie Dempsey on 8 December 1948 in Selkirk, Scotland. He was always referred to by his parents as Ian, a Scottish Gaelic term for John. He began his career as an aspiring pop star before turning to acting; his first professional appearance was at the Edinburgh International Festival, in Frank Dunlop's 'Pop Theatre' production of The Winter's Tale, at the Assembly Hall, in 1966.

== Theatre ==
Peter Blake trained at the Royal Scottish Academy of Music and Drama and joined the Citizens' Theatre Company, performing in a production of Twelfth Night, and Michael Blakemore's original production of Bertolt Brecht's The Resistible Rise of Arturo Ui which opened in September 1967 at the Citizens' Theatre, Glasgow and, in August 1968, performed at The Lyceum, Edinburgh as part of the Edinburgh Festival. After graduating in 1969, he worked briefly as a stage manager in several Soho strip clubs before he joined the international cast of Victor Spinetti's Amsterdam production of Hair, in 1970, and subsequently played the role of Berger in the show's national tour of The Netherlands.

Returning to the UK there followed a string of London's West End rock musicals, with roles in Hair at the Shaftesbury Theatre; as Pharaoh in the original productions of Joseph and the Amazing Technicolor Dreamcoat at the Albery Theatre, as Pontius Pilate in Jesus Christ Superstar at the Palace Theatre; as Frank-N-Furter in The Rocky Horror Show at the King's Road Theatre; as Peter in the revue What's a Nice Country like US doing in a State like This? at the May Fair Theatre; and reprising his role of Frank-N-Furter at the Comedy Theatre.

Blake also performed at the Chichester Festival Theatre, work included Julius Caesar, Murder in the Cathedral and In Order of Appearance; out of London theatre work included Nestor in Irma La Douce at the Sheffield Crucible; Count Dracula in Charles McKeown's play Dracula at the Thorndike Theatre, Leatherhead; Marat in The Promise at the Churchill Theatre, Bromley; and on tour in Jack Rosenthal's Smash!; Alan Ayckbourn's Absent Friends, Ray Cooney's Funny Money, and The Rocky Horror Show returning to his old role of 'Frank-N-Furter' in 1992 and 1994; he also starred in several pantomimes, including as Captain Hook in Peter Pan, as King Rat in Dick Whittington and as Abanazer in Aladdin.

== Television and film ==
Peter Blake's best-known role was the flamboyant and boastful Kirk St Moritz, resplendent in white suit, big collars and golden medallion, in the British sitcom Dear John (1986–87). He appeared in other British television series including as Tony Miller, a member of CI5 in the hard-hitting police drama The Professionals (1978). As Michael Vincent in Penmarric (1979), Andy Evol in Agony (1979–1981), Dr Courant in Praying Mantis (1982), Carl Pierce in A Very Peculiar Practice (1986), Aubrey Owen in Dogfood Dan & the Carmarthen Cowboy (1988), David in Split Ends (1989), as Harvey in Fiddlers Three (1991) and as Ken Tate in EastEnders (2010).

Blake guested on such television shows as The Squirrels, Out, Z-Cars, Minder, Shoestring, Shine on Harvey Moon, Bergerac, After Henry, Alas Smith and Jones, Ever Decreasing Circles, Just Good Friends, Boon, The New Statesman, Woof!, The High Life, The Bill, and Casualty, among others. His film appearances include Intimate Games (1976), Murder on Line One (1989), Cash in Hand (1998), Heroes and Villains (2006), The Power of Three (2011) and Run For Your Wife (2012).

== Selected filmography ==
Year	Title	Role	Notes
1972 - 1978	Z-Cars	Barwell/ Chas Fairchild/ Colin Steen	3 episodes
1976	The Brothers	Scotsman	Episode: "The Knock on the Door"
1976	Intimate Games	John	Film
1976	The Squirrels	Postman	Episode: "Men of Straw"
1977	ITV Playhouse	Club manager	Episode: "The Proofing Season"
1978	Angels	Eric Dowden	Episode: "Fraternity"
1978	Out	Pretty Billy Binns	2 episodes
1978	Play for Today	Popstar	Episode: "The After Dinner Joke"
1978	The Professionals	Tony Millar	Episode: "Everest Was Also Conquered"
1979	Penmaric	Michael Vincent	8 episodes
1979 - 1981	Agony	Andy Evol	14 episodes
1980	Minder	Barry	Episode: "Monday Night Fever"
1980	Shoestring	Mike Frewin	Episode: "The Mayfly Dance"
1981	BBC2 Playhouse	Registrar	Episode: "Days"
1981	Funny Man	Monty	Episode: "Side by Side"
1982	Educating Marmalade	Weasel Pratt	Episode: "Cringe Hill"
1982	Murphy's Mob	Jock Ferguson	4 episodes
1982	Praying Mantis	Dr Courant	TV film
1982	Shine on Harvey Moon	Major Saxby	Episode: "The Party Line"
1983	Bergerac	Fontaine	Episode: "Clap Hands, Here Comes Charlie"
1983	Crown Court	The Hon. Mark Wharton	Episode: "Personal Credit" (3 parts)
1984	Freud	Darkschewitsch	Episode: "The Hypnotist"
1984	Just Good Friends	Laurence	2 episodes
1984 - 1998	Alas Smith and Jones	James Bond	4 episodes
1985	Full House	Giles	Episode: "The Waiting Game"
1985	Moving	Peter Bending	2 episodes
1986	A Very Peculiar Practice	Carl Pierce	Episode: "We Love, That's Why We're Here"
1986	Ever Decreasing Circles	Rex Tyman	Episode: "One Night Stand"
1986	Fresh Fields	Pool Attendant	Episode: "Happy Returns"
1986	Victoria Wood: As Seen on TV	Craig	1 episode
1986 - 1987	Dear John	Kirk	14 episodes
1987	Boon	Barry Drinkwater	Episode: "A Ride on the Wild Side"
1988	After Henry	Nick	Episode: "The Older Man"
1988	Dogfood Dan & the Carmarthen Cowboy	Aubrey Owen	6 episodes
1989	Murder on Line One	Marc Russell	Film
1989	Split Ends	David	6 episodes
1989	William Tell	Crispin	Episode: "Goldilocks"
1990	The New Statesman	Kerry Grout	Episode: "Who Shot Alan B'Stard?"
1991	City Lights	Minister	4 episodes
1991	Fiddler's Three	Harvey	14 episodes
1992	Runaway Bay	Mr. Marshall	Episode: "Taking the Rap"
1992	Woof!	Dave Barry	Episode: "Dad's Birthday"
1993	Brookside	Father John Monroe	3 episodes
1995	Coronation Street	Nick Gerrity	2 episodes
1995	Crown Prosecutor	John Harper	1 episode
1995	The High Life	Guy Wersch	Episode: "Dug"
1998	The Bill	Greg Beattie	Episode: "Christmas Star"
1998	The Broker's Man	Danny Durbridge	Episode: "Swansong"
1998	Cash in Hand	Agent John Maniac	Film
1998	The Jump	DI Frank Laughton	1 episode
1999	Jonathan Creek	Otto Danzigger	Episode: "The Eyes of Tiresias"
2000	Dark Realm	Detective	Episode: "She's the One"
2001	Family Affairs	Eric	1 episode
2001	Lexx	Oliver	Episode: "Xevivor"
2002	Barbara	Geoff	Episode: "Crime"
2003	Sir Gadabout: The Worst Knight in the Land	Lord Moltrace	Episode: "Sir Badabout"
2004	Casualty	Michael Monroe	Episode: "Dreams and Disappointments"
2004	The Courtroom	Simon Harper	Episode: "Owzat!"
2004	Doctors	Ian McLeish	Episode: "Greens and Blues"
2005	The Mysti Show	Saber	1 episode
2005	Taggart	Sergeant Bill Kent	Episode: "Do or Die"
2006	Heroes and Villains	Julian	Film
2010	EastEnders	Ken Tate	4 episodes
2011	The Power of Three	Henri	Film
2012	Run For Your Wife	Man reading newspaper	Film

== Discography ==
In 1977, Peter Blake reached number 40 in the UK Singles Chart with the song Lipsmackin' Rock 'n' Rollin, performing it on the BBC Television music show Top of the Pops on 29 September 1977; and subsequently released a single called Boogie Breakout in 1979.

Stage Cast Recordings include :

- Hair - The American Tribal Love-Rock Musical (Original Amsterdam Cast) - LP.
  Date of release: 1970.
  Written by Galt MacDermot, Gerome Ragni and James Rado.
- London production of the musical, "What's a Nice Country like U.S. Doing in a State like This?"
  Date of release: 1976.
  Music by Cary Hoffman. Words by Ira Gasman.
- Hard Times: The Musical (Original London Cast Recording Highlights) - EP.
  Date of release: 1 June 2000.
  Book, music and lyrics by Christopher Tookey and Hugh Thomas (from the novel by Charles Dickens).

== Theatre credits ==
Production	Year	Role	Venue
The Winter's Tale	1966	Various characters	Edinburgh Festival
Twelfth Night	1967	Officer	Glasgow Citizens' Theatre
The Resistible Rise of Arturo Ui	1967	Grocer / Gangster	Glasgow Citizens' Theatre Company
The Resistible Rise of Arturo Ui	1968	2nd Chicago Grocer	Royal Lyceum, Edinburgh Festival
Hair	1969–70	Berger	Amsterdam / National Tour of Holland
Hair	1970–73	Berger / Claude / Woof	Shaftesbury Theatre, West End
Joseph & the Amazing Technicolor Dreamcoat	1973	Judah	Albery Theatre, West End
Why Not Stay For Breakfast?	1973	Hippie	National Tour
Irma La Douce	1973	Nestor Le Fripe	Crucible Theatre, Sheffield
Jesus Christ Superstar	1974	Pontius Pilate	Palace Theatre, West End
The Rocky Horror Show	1975–76	Frank-N-Furter	King's Road Theatre, Chelsea
What's A Nice Country Like U.S. Doing in A State Like This?	1976	Peter	Mayfair Theatre, West End
Make Me A World	1976	Lucifer	Chichester Theatre
In Order of Appearance	1977	Various characters	Chichester Festival
Julius Caesar	1977	Flavius / Decius Brutus / Titinius	Chichester Festival
Murder in the Cathedral	1977	4th Temptor	Chichester Cathedral
Dracula	1978	Count Dracula	Thorndike Theatre, Leatherhead
The Rocky Horror Show	1979	Frank-N-Furter	Comedy Theatre, West End
The Promise	1980	Marat	Churchill Theatre, Bromley
SMASH!	1981	Don Black	National Tour
Run for Your Wife	1982	De Sergeant Troughton	Shaftesbury Theatre, West End
Dear Anyone	1983	Danny	Cambridge Theatre, West End
See How They Run	1984	The Intruder	Shaftesbury Theatre, West End
Goldilocks & the Three Bears	1986	Heinkel	Canada
Run for Your Wife	1986	De Sergeant Troughton	Criterion Theatre, West End
It Runs in the Family	1987	Dr. Mike Connolly	Yvonne Arnaud Theatre, Guildford
Absent Friends	1988	Paul	National Tour
Dick Whittington	1988	King Rat	Richmond Theatre, London
Aladdin	1990	Abanazer	Palace Theatre, Manchester
The Rocky Horror Show	1991–92	Frank-N-Furter	National Tour
Alfie	1992	Various characters	National Tour
Love Off the Shelf	1993	Hero / Hamilton	Scarborough in the Round
Dick Whittington	1993	King Rat	The Forum, Hatfield
Penny for the Guy	1994	Burglar Fawkes	Churchill Theatre, Bromley, Kent
The Rocky Horror Show	1994	Frank-N-Furter	Summer Season Bournemouth & Blackpool
The Snow Queen	1994	Igor	Yvonne Arnaud Theatre, Guildford
Absent Friends	1996–97	Paul	National Tour
Snow White and the Seven Dwarfs	1997	Herman the Henchman	Orchard Theatre, Dartford
Gym and Tonic	1999	Ken	Theatre Royal, Windsor
Say Who You Are	1999	Stuart Wheeler	The Mill, Sonning
Hard Times	2000	Mr E.W.B Childers	Theatre Royal Haymarket, West End
Bridges and Harmonies	2000	Alex	Bridewell Theatre, London
Dick Whittington	2001	King Rat	Marlowe Theatre, Canterbury
Money To Burn	2003	Lord Oliver Justin	The Venue, West End
Oscar - The Musical	2004	Oscar Wilde	Shaw Theatre, London
Peter Pan	2005	Captain Hook	Hippodrome, Birmingham
Funny Money	2006	Vic Johnson	National Tour
Peter Pan	2006	Captain Hook	Hippodrome, Bristol
Peter Pan	2007	Captain Hook	Alhambra Theatre, Bradford

== Personal life ==
He married for the second time in 1998, this marriage was later dissolved in 2011. Latterly he resided in France, where he died on 21 July 2018.
