= Bedroom Farce =

Bedroom Farce may refer to:

- Bedroom farce, a type of light comedy focusing on sexual pairings and recombinations of characters
- Bedroom Farce (play), a 1975 play by British playwright Alan Ayckbourn
- "Bedroom Farce", 1984 season 1 episode 5 of Duty Free (TV series)
