= You Again? =

American TV series

- Genre: Sitcom
- Based on: Home to Roost by Eric Chappell
- Written by: Jay Abramowitz; Al Aidekman; Eric Chappell; Gary Jacobs; Doug McIntyre; Tom Musca; Bernie Orenstein; Jerry Stahl; Saul Turteltaub; Zachary D. Wechsler; Vivian Rhodes
- Directed by: Peter Bonerz; Bill Foster; Gerren Keith; Howard Murray; Jerry Paris
- Starring: Jack Klugman; John Stamos; Elizabeth Bennett
- Composers: Chris Boardman; Rik Howard; Bob Wirth
- Country of origin: United States
- Original language: English
- No. of seasons: 2
- No. of episodes: 26

Production
- Executive producers: Ronny Hallin; Sarah Lawson; Bernie Orenstein; Saul Turteltaub
- Producers: Al Aidekman; Rick Mitz; Liz Sage
- Camera setup: Multi-camera
- Running time: 30 minutes
- Production companies: Sweater Productions; Taft Entertainment/Lawson Group; Taft Entertainment Television

Original release
- Network: NBC
- Release: February 27, 1986 – January 7, 1987

Related
- Home to Roost

You Again? is an American sitcom television series that aired for two seasons on NBC from February 27, 1986, to January 7, 1987, followed by a single rerun episode on March 30, 1987.

It was based on the British show Home to Roost.

== Synopsis ==
Jack Klugman stars as Henry Willows, a man still embittered from his divorce ten years earlier, who has made no effort to see his son Matt (John Stamos) during that time. Henry has become fairly comfortable with his life as a supermarket manager and is not really looking to make major changes to it when Matt arrives looking to stay with his father, whom he hardly knows anymore. Matt is an ill-mannered but quite attractive youth who is very popular with the girls. He drives the gruff Henry almost over the edge, but of course in the end familial ties conquer all differences in sitcom tradition.

== Cast ==
=== Main cast ===
- Jack Klugman as Henry Willows
- John Stamos as Matt Willows
- Elizabeth Bennett as Enid Thompkins
- Valerie Landsburg as Pam
- Barbara Rhoades as Maggie Davis
- Joseph Roman as Maury (recurring role)

=== Guest cast ===
- The Beach Boys
- K Callan
- Conrad Janis
- Richard Kline
- Robert Morse
- Alan Oppenheimer
- Marion Ross
- Armin Shimerman
- Liz Torres
- David Wohl

== Production ==
=== Development ===
The show was based on the British show Home to Roost, which was still in production at the same time. British actress Elizabeth Bennett played housekeeper "Enid Thompson" in the British version and "Enid Tompkins" in the US version simultaneously, so she was a frequent commuter from London to Los Angeles during the time in which You Again? was in production.

== Episode list ==
=== Season 1 (1986) ===
| No. overall | No. in season | Title | Directed by | Written by | Original release date |
|---|---|---|---|---|---|
| 1 | 1 | "All You Need Is Love" | Peter Bonerz | Eric Chappell | February 27, 1986 |
| 2 | 2 | "Dating Henry" | Peter Bonerz | Eric Chappell | March 3, 1986 |
| 3 | 3 | "Small Chance" | John Bowab | Eric Chappell | March 10, 1986 |
| 4 | 4 | "Henry and Matt Get Sick" | Jerry Paris | John B. Collins | March 17, 1986 |
| 5 | 5 | "Plastic Dream World" | Gerren Keith | Eric Chappell | March 24, 1986 |
| 6 | 6 | "Bad Apples" | Lee Bernhardi | Jerry Stahl | March 31, 1986 |
| 7 | 7 | "Enid Quits" | Barbara Schultz | Jerry Stahl | April 7, 1986 |
| 8 | 8 | "A New Life" | Peter Bonerz | Eric Chappell | April 14, 1986 |
| 9 | 9 | "Suspect" | Jerry Paris | Eric Chappell | April 28, 1986 |
| 10 | 10 | "The Wake" | Peter Baldwin | Sam Greenbaum | May 5, 1986 |
| 11 | 11 | "Uncle Randy" | Gerren Keith | Vivian Rhodes | May 19, 1986 |
| 12 | 12 | "Marry Me, a Little" | Howard Murray | Rick Mitz | June 2, 1986 |
| 13 | 13 | "The Strike" | Gerren Keith | Doug McIntyre | June 9, 1986 |

=== Season 2 (1986–87) ===
| No. overall | No. in season | Title | Directed by | Written by | Original release date |
|---|---|---|---|---|---|
| 14 | 1 | "The Grad" | Unknown | Unknown | October 1, 1986 |
| 15 | 2 | "Quit is a Four Letter Word" | Unknown | Unknown | October 8, 1986 |
| 16 | 3 | "The Audition" | Unknown | Unknown | October 15, 1986 |
| 17 | 4 | "Life, Liberty and the Pursuit of Traffic Lights" | Unknown | Unknown | October 29, 1986 |
| 18 | 5 | "Sports Fantasy" | Unknown | Unknown | November 5, 1986 |
| 19 | 6 | "The Lush Life" | Unknown | Unknown | November 12, 1986 |
| 20 | 7 | "The DJ" | Unknown | Unknown | November 26, 1986 |
| 21 | 8 | "Social Insecurity" | Unknown | Unknown | December 3, 1986 |
| 22 | 9 | "Personals" | Unknown | Unknown | December 10, 1986 |
| 23 | 10 | "Enid Moves In" | Unknown | Unknown | December 24, 1986 |
| 24 | 11 | "Good Neighbors" | Unknown | Unknown | December 27, 1986 |
| 25 | 12 | "Henry, the Kissinger" | Unknown | Unknown | December 31, 1986 |
| 26 | 13 | "Where the Sun Don't Shine" | Unknown | Unknown | January 7, 1987 |

== Reception ==
=== Ratings ===
You Again? did not achieve the same level of hit status of Home to Roost in the UK, with many viewers finding it difficult to accept the 64-year-old Klugman as the father of 23-year-old Stamos. Nonetheless, the show finished at #19 in its first season's ratings, ahead of other, longer-running shows such as The Facts of Life or newcomers like 227, and was strong enough for NBC to renew it for a second season. The first season aired on Mondays at 8:00 PM, and the second season aired on Wednesdays at 9:30 PM, ending its run on January 7, 1987 after 26 episodes; eventually later that same year, John Stamos began appearing on the long-running sitcom Full House.
