= Tyler Butterworth =

British actor (born 1959)

- Born: 6 February 1959 (age 67); Redhill, Surrey, England
- Occupation: Actor
- Years active: 1962–2008
- Spouse: Janet Dibley (m. 1998)
- Children: 2
- Parents: Peter Butterworth (father); Janet Brown (mother)

Tyler Butterworth (born 6 February 1959) is an English actor.

== Early life ==
Butterworth was born on 6 February 1959 in Redhill, Surrey. His father was Peter Butterworth, who starred in many of the Carry On films. His mother was the actress and Margaret Thatcher impersonator Janet Brown. His first roles were as a child in the 1960s in such films as Darling (1965) and the Morecambe & Wise feature film The Magnificent Two (1967).

== Career ==
Butterworth starred in the black comedy Consuming Passions (1988) opposite Vanessa Redgrave and Jonathan Pryce. On television, Butterworth has appeared in Rumpole of the Bailey, Bergerac, Last of the Summer Wine, Casualty, The Bill, The Darling Buds of May, Home to Roost, Hetty Wainthropp Investigates and starred as Osborne in the ITV sitcom Fiddlers Three.

He also played Proteus in the BBC Shakespeare adaptation of The Two Gentlemen of Verona in 1983, Mr Archer in Whizziwig, and Angelo in the CITV children's sci-fi comedy series Mike and Angelo for its first two series.

In 2008, he moved into producing and was a development producer on a NASA series.

Since then, he has concentrated on voice work.

== Selected filmography ==
Year	Title	Role	Notes
1962	Live Now – Pay Later	Child at Table	Film (uncredited)
1965	Darling	William Prosser-Jones	Film (uncredited)
1967	The Magnificent Two	Miguel Diaz	Film
1970	ITV Sunday Night Theatre	Sebastien Jardine	Episode: "Married Alive"
1983	The Two Gentlemen of Verona	Proteus	TV movie
1986	Casualty	Mark	Episode: "High Noon"
1986	Chance in a Million	Dowling	Episode: "Naming the Day"
1988	Bergerac	'Cruncher' Smith	Episode: "Burnt"
1988	Boon	John	Episode: "Have a Nice Day"
1988	Consuming Passions	Ian Littleton	Film
1989	Home to Roost	Trevor	Episode: "Thought for the Day"
1989 - 1990	Mike and Angelo	Angelo	21 episodes
1991	Fiddlers Three	Osbourne	13 episodes
1991	Rumpole of the Bailey	Roger Fabian	Episode: "Rumpole for the Prosecution"
1992	Birds of a Feather	Mike	Episode: "Wipe that Smile Off Your Tape"
1992	The Darling Buds of May	Reverend Candy	4 episodes
1993	The Gingerbread Girl	Eddie	7 episodes
1994	Minder	Rawle	Episode: "Bring Me the Head of Arthur Daley"
1995	The Bill	Symonds	Episode: "They All Look the Same"
1996	Hetty Wainthropp Investigates	Freddy Slater	Episode: "Lost Chords"
1998	The Mrs Bradley Mysteries	Ferdinand Bradley	Episode: "Speedy Death"
1999	An Ideal Husband	Phipps	Film
2000	Waking the Dead	Mr. Whitemore	Episode: "Pilot (Part 1)"
2000	Whizziwig	Archer	Episode: "Out of the Bag"
2001	Doctors	John Duncan	Episode: "Abuse of Power"
2001	Peak Practice	Keith Shaw	Episode: "Bad Tony"
2002	The Bill	Kelly	2 episodes
2002	Casualty	Mr. Ewans	Episode: "Acceptance"
2004	The Bill	Defence Barrister	Episode: "Don't Bring Me Down"
2004	Peter Ackroyd's London	Merry Andrew	Episode: "The Crowd"
2008	Last of the Summer Wine	Chistlehurst	Episode: "In Which Romance Isn't Dead – Just Incompetent"

== Personal life ==
Butterworth is married to actress Janet Dibley; the couple have two sons.
