= The Bounder =

British ITV sitcom 1982–83

- Genre: Comedy
- Created by: Eric Chappell
- Written by: Eric Chappell
- Directed by: Vernon Lawrence
- Starring: Peter Bowles; George Cole; Rosalind Ayres; Isla Blair
- Country of origin: United Kingdom
- Original language: English
- No. of series: 2
- No. of episodes: 14

Production
- Producer: Vernon Lawrence
- Production company: Yorkshire Television

Original release
- Network: ITV
- Release: 16 April 1982 – 28 October 1983

The Bounder is a British sitcom which ran from 16 April 1982 to 28 October 1983, made by Yorkshire Television. The series starred Peter Bowles (of To the Manor Born fame) as Howard Booth, an ex-convict who served two years in jail. He lives with his brother-in-law, Trevor Mountjoy (George Cole), and his sister (Trevor's wife), Mary (Rosalind Ayres). The latter left after Series One in 1982. It also starred Isla Blair as the next door widowed neighbour, Laura Miles. This series was created by Eric Chappell.

== Production ==
In 1981, following the transmission of the third series of Only When I Laugh, Peter Bowles informed Yorkshire Television, who produced the sitcom, that he would only sign on to do a fourth run if he was given his own series. The Bounder was specifically written by Eric Chappell for Bowles to play the lead role. The pair had first worked together on a 1977 episode of Rising Damp and then the four series of Only When I Laugh which aired between 1979 and 1982.

The series co-starred George Cole, then well known for playing Arthur Daley in the comedy-drama series Minder, which was concurrently in production at the time. This sitcom marked Cole's return to the format after a three-year gap, after previously starring as troubled writer Gordon Maple in Don't Forget to Write!

Chappell told the Reading Evening Post in 1982, "Peter played the part [in Rising Damp] with such flamboyancy and style. It was the first time I had seen him in situation comedy and he did it so beautifully. He was a natural choice to play Archie Glover [in] Only When I Laugh. And, after watching his performance in the hospital comedy, I thought it would be marvellous to create a likeable rogue who had all the qualities we had seen conveyed by Peter."

Bowles aired his delight at the series to the Reading Evening Post, "It's the first time I have had a series written for me, and I'm thrilled and very enthusiastic about it. I'm also delighted to be working with George Cole for the first time. He is a master of comedy character roles."

The series was cancelled after two series, however less than a year after its cancellation, in 1984 a US pilot was produced by CBS which starred Michael McKeown as Howard, Jeannette Arnette as his sister Bonnie, Richard Masur as her husband Charles and Francine Tacker as Laura. However, the pilot was not picked up and a full series was not commissioned.

== Home media ==
The first series only was released on VHS and DVD in the US on 16 September 2003 by BFS Entertainment. The complete series was subsequently released in the UK on DVD by Network on 20 August 2007. The series was also later distributed in Australia by Time Life where it was released in 2010.

== Series overview ==
Series	Episodes	Originally released	
Series	Episodes	First released	Last released
1	7	16 April 1982	28 May 1982
2	7	16 September 1983	28 October 1983

== Episodes ==
=== Series 1 (1982) ===
No. overall	No. in series	Title	Original release date
1	1	"He’s Not Heavy, He’s My Brother-in-Law"	16 April 1982
Howard Booth, a smoothly plausible former investment manager, emerges from prison after serving two years for fraud. Having nowhere to go and no funds, he imposes himself on his trusting younger sister Mary and her cynical estate agent husband, Trevor Mountjoy.
2	2	"Howard at the Majestic"	23 April 1982
Determined to treat Trevor and Mary to a wedding anniversary dinner at a posh hotel, Howard cons his way into a private party, pretending to be a school old boy. After being exposed by the manager, he attempts to impersonate the head waiter. Despite his initially successful plan, he comes badly unstuck. Guest stars: Ronnie Stevens as Hotel Manager; Glyn Owen as ‘Nipper’; Dennis Ramsden as Charles; Alan Curtis as Toby; Arnold Diamond as Diner
3	3	"We’ll Go No More a-Roving"	30 April 1982
Howard romances Laura, a well-off widowed neighbour. Having done some creative writing whilst in prison, he pretends to be a dashing novelist and romantic poet. But she soon learns the truth.
4	4	"Raising the Wind"	7 May 1982
When Trevor won't advance Howard a small loan, he cons a bank manager into investing in an African diamond mine he claims to have discovered during a fictitious trip to Africa. But the scheme is quickly exposed as a fraud. Guest stars: Larry Martyn as Window Cleaner; Garfield Morgan as Bank Manager
5	5	"On Approval"	14 May 1982
Howard gives Laura a £7000 diamond bracelet, which he has obtained on approval using Trevor's name. Laura likes it and Howard has to face paying for it or persuading her to reject it.
6	6	"Suspicion"	21 May 1982
Howard and Trevor are shopping at an expensive clothes shop, but Howard spots his former cellmate ‘Greasy" at his usual occupation - shoplifting. When Greasy slips the purloined items into Trevor's shopping bag, Howard has to do some quick thinking, including impersonating a police officer. Guest stars: Ken Jones as ‘Greasy Spriggs; Tony Steedman as Cutforth
7	7	"The Rival"	28 May 1982
Laura is being wooed by an Italian, Count Montefiore, which leads Howard to jealousy. He engages an enquiry agent to check up on the Count and see if he is really who he claims to be. But the investigator mistakenly checks Howard out, rather than the Count. Guest stars: Stephen Greif as Count Montefiore; John Rapley as Enquiry Agent; Frank Coda as Waiter

=== Series 2 (1983) ===
No. overall	No. in series	Title	Original release date
8	1	"A Tale of the Unexpected"	16 September 1983
Mary has left Trevor and the house is a mess. Trevor engages a cleaning woman, but Howard thinks she is Trevor’s girlfriend and scares her into leaving. Guest star: Sharon Duce as Doreen Brent
9	2	"Matchmaker"	23 September 1983
Howard starts the HB Matrimonial Agency, but the first (and only) two clients are dissatisfied with his bumbling efforts and demand their money back. Guest stars: Michael Robbins as Bert; Frances de la Tour as Celia
10	3	"Raffles"	30 September 1983
Laura’s house is burgled and her jewellery stolen. The police suspect it is the work of a known thief, nicknamed ‘Raffles’, but Howard's criminal record causes them to suspect him instead. Howard discovers Raffles breaking into Trevor's house, but realises it is really ‘Greasy’, with whom he shared a cell in prison. Guest stars: Ken Wynne as Raffles/Greasy Spriggs; James Grout as DS Evans
11	4	"Love Me, Love My Dog"	7 October 1983
Howard is still smitten with Laura, but she is not as gullible as he supposes and resists his advances. To compound her resistance, she acquires ‘Sabre’, a German Shepherd Dog, who takes Howard's presence as a threat. Guest star: Tim Stern as Potter
12	5	"Third Party"	14 October 1983
Howard and Laura believe that Mary is seeing another man, but it turns out that he is only trying to sell her insurance. But then Laura falls for him – or does she? Guest star: Michael Culver as Reggie Thorne
13	6	"A Genuine Simpson"	21 October 1983
Howard meets ‘Softly’ Simpson, a painter and forger he knew in prison, and persuades him to paint Trevor. But the painting looks more like the portrait of the Duke of Wellington on a five-pound note (withdrawn in 1991) than Trevor. Guest star: Nicholas Le Prevost as Simpson
14	7	"Unreasonable Behaviour"	28 October 1983
Mary sues Trevor for divorce. Laura is attracted to Trevor, but Howard sets him up with Gloria, Trevor's secretary, who is already engaged. They all meet at a social function where Trevor is due to speak, and it is a disaster. Mary phones to ask to see Trevor, and he hopes for reconciliation, but the situation is left unresolved. Guest star: Patricia Brake as Gloria Pert
