= Hectic (disambiguation) =

Hectic or variation, may refer to:

- Hectic, the 1988 debut EP by ska band Operation Ivy
- "Hectic", a song by American rapper Cardi B from the mixtape Gangsta Bitch Music, Vol. 2
- "Hectic", a song by South Korean rapper RM from his 2022 album Indigo
- The Hectics (1958–1962), the first (school) band of Freddie Mercury
- Hectic Records, a music label
- Operation Hectic, an assassination plot during the Rhodesian Bush War
- Hectic Fever (or hectic), a symptom of the illness of consumption
- Kurt Hectic, the main character from the video game MDK

== See also ==
- Hectic equation
