= Money to Burn =

Money to Burn may refer to:

== Film and television ==
- Money to Burn (1911 film), directed by Edwin S. Porter
- Money to Burn (1922 film), directed by Rowland V. Lee
- Money to Burn (1926 film), directed by Walter Lang
- Money to Burn (1939 film), directed by Gus Meins
- Money to Burn (1973 film), TV film starring E. G. Marshall
- Money to Burn (1983 film), directed by Virginia L. Stone
- Money to Burn (2010 film), starring David Carradine
- "Money to Burn" (Randall and Hopkirk (Deceased)), an episode of the 1969 British television series Randall and Hopkirk (Deceased)
- "Money to Burn", 1988 episode of British sitcom 'Allo 'Allo! (series 5)

== Music ==
- "Money to Burn" (Richard Ashcroft song), 2000
- Money to Burn (album), 2006 rap album by C-Bo
- Money to Burn (musical), 2003 musical by Daniel Abineri
- "Money to Burn" (George Jones song), 1959

== Other media ==
- Money to Burn (performance art), 2010 performance by Dread Scott
