= Whizziwig =

Children's science fiction television series from the United Kingdom

- Genre: Children's television series, Science fiction
- Theme music composer: Barry Francis Fry
- Country of origin: United Kingdom
- Original language: English
- No. of seasons: 3
- No. of episodes: 18

Production
- Running time: 18 mins

Original release
- Network: ITV (CITV)
- Release: 7 January 1998 – 16 February 2000

Whizziwig is a science fiction children's programme broadcast on CITV between 7 January 1998 and 16 February 2000 based on the books by award winning children's author Malorie Blackman.

== Plot summary ==
Whizziwig centres on the adventures of a boy called Ben and his best friend Steve who befriend a small pink alien approximately the size of a rugby ball, whose ship crash lands on the roof of Steve's home during her interplanetary travel to visit relatives and which now needs repairing. Whizziwig has the ability to grant wishes to anyone who utters the words "I wish...", however wishes had to be made for someone else and would last a maximum of 24 hours. A recurring theme is Ben and Steve trying to deceive their friend into granting their intentional wishes only for the alien to become wise to the scheme.

Ben would keep Whizziwig hidden, often smuggling her into school in his school bag. Many hilarious escapades ensued as the wishes made by unaware students in Whizziwig's earshot would be granted.

== Cast ==
- Jenny Hutchinson - Whizziwig
- Kara Noble - Whizziwig
- Rebecca Nagan - Whizziwig
- Don Austen - Whizziwig Puppeteer
- Louis McKenzie - Ben Sinclair
- Matthew Barker - Steve Fleming
- Joan Oliver - Gina Sinclair
- Brian Bovell - Daniel Sinclair
- Mona Hammond - Auntie Dottie
- Nimmy March - Lizzie Sinclair
- Tyler Butterworth - Mr. Archer
- Martin Arrowsmith - Steve "Slippery" Sloper
- Colin Prockter - Mayor
- Andre Mahjouri - Paul
- Ebony Francis - Jennifer
- Catherine Barr - Paula
- Brian Trump - The Underwear Snatcher
- Kaefan Shaw and Anthony Asbury - Archie the Parrot
- Glen Kinch - Budgie
- Douglas Fielding - Foreman
- Anna Gilbert - Mrs. Morton
- Yvonne Marlowe - Woman In Park
- Sheila Halse - Woman In Street
- Natasha Lee - Jessica
- Melissa Simpson - Katie
- Sue Cleaver - Inspector Pascal
- Richard Trinder - P.C. Reid
- Anna Winkles - Caitlin
