= Duty Free (TV series) =

British TV sitcom (1984–1986)

- Created by: Eric Chappell
- Starring: Keith Barron; Gwen Taylor; Joanna Van Gyseghem; Neil Stacy
- Country of origin: United Kingdom
- Original language: English
- No. of series: 3
- No. of episodes: 22

Production
- Running time: 21x25 minutes 1x50 minutes
- Production company: Yorkshire Television

Original release
- Network: ITV
- Release: 13 February 1984 – 25 December 1986

Duty Free is a British sitcom written by Eric Chappell and Jean Warr that aired on ITV from 13 February 1984 to 25 December 1986. It was made by Yorkshire Television.

== Cast ==
- Keith Barron as David Pearce
- Gwen Taylor as Amy Pearce
- Joanna Van Gyseghem as Linda Cochran
- Neil Stacy as Robert Cochran
- Carlos Douglas as Carlos the Waiter
- Bunny May as the assistant manager (series 1)
- George Camiller as the manager (series 2 and 3)
- Ray Mort as George (series 1 and 2)
- Hugo Bower as Zimmerman (series 1)

== Plot ==
Duty Free is about two British couples, David and Amy Pearce and Robert and Linda Cochran, who meet while holidaying at the same Spanish hotel in Marbella and the interruptive affair conducted by David Pearce and Linda Cochran during their break. Another recurring character is the hotel waiter Carlos.

Although set in Spain, the show was recorded entirely in the Leeds Studios – only for the concluding Christmas special was the budget found to film some scenes in Spain at the Don Carlos Hotel and Spa.

Like many British sitcoms, there was a class-related tension between the two; with the Pearces working-class from Northampton, and the Cochrans a more affluent, middle-class couple from Henley-on-Thames in Oxfordshire. The character of David Pearce, much to his wife's chagrin, became uncomfortable with his own status and politics after meeting the Cochrans and tried to change his outlook.

Series 1 and 2 take place during the same two weeks long holiday, leading to the show famously being dubbed "the holiday that never ends". The first episode of Series 3 takes place back in the UK, a year later, but subsequently the story returns to Spain.

The series was based on a one-off TV play by Eric Chappell, We're Strangers Here, first performed on TV with Geraldine McEwan and Ian Hendry as a two-hander and subsequently on stage as a four-hander at the Theatre Royal, Windsor.

== Series overview ==
Series	Episodes	Originally released	
Series	Episodes	First released	Last released
1	7	13 February 1984	26 March 1984
2	7	6 September 1984	18 October 1984
3	7	8 January 1986	19 February 1986
Christmas Special		25 December 1986	

== Episodes ==
=== Series 1 (1984) ===
No. overall	No. in series	Title	Directed by	Written by	Original release date
1	1	"Viva Espana"	Vernon Lawrence	Eric Chappell and Jean Warr	13 February 1984
David and Amy Pearce arrive in Spain for their 'second honeymoon', using David's redundancy pay. Things start badly for David when his suitcase breaks and he finds Amy has forgotten to pack any of his shoes but there is compensation when he meets Linda Cochran, who is on holiday with her husband Robert and complains about everything and hates foreign holidays. Amy is displeased with David's attempts to impress Linda and takes steps to dampen his enthusiasm.
2	2	"El Macho"	Vernon Lawrence	Eric Chappell and Jean Warr	20 February 1984
Amy and Robert do not share their spouses' enthusiasm for a trip to see the famous matador El Macho in action. After the fight, David's pretentious efforts to impress Linda by claiming he is an expert on bull-fighting are punctured by the arrival of El Macho and David is further humiliated by his failure to support Amy's spirited attack on blood sports. The humiliation continues back at the hotel when he rushes to the aid of Linda, who reports a prowler on her balcony, prompting a definite response from Amy.
3	3	"Praying Mantis"	Vernon Lawrence	Eric Chappell and Jean Warr	27 February 1984
Amy is scornful of Linda's yoga exercises and David's attempts to impress her by keeping fit, which land him in bed with a bad back. Anxious to prove to Linda that he is unharmed and healthy, he again incurs the wrath of Amy, who throws half of his only pair of shoes over the balcony to prevent him from meeting Linda, whom Amy likens to the praying mantis on the bedroom wall.
4	4	"Spanish Lace"	Vernon Lawrence	Eric Chappell and Jean Warr	5 March 1984
The couples join a coach trip to the mountains, where David buys Linda a gypsy shawl she has admired but when Amy finds she has lost her money, he sells his watch. Noticing the watch has gone and the shawl on Linda, arouses Amy's suspicions, causing David to claim the shawl was actually for his wife. When Robert buys Linda another shawl and David feels the need to buy one too as compensation for Linda David passes off the surplus shawl as a gift for Amy's mother. Amy, however, is not convinced and takes an artistic revenge on David, leading to trouble in a German inn.
5	5	"Bedroom Farce"	Vernon Lawrence	Eric Chappell and Jean Warr	12 March 1984
After Amy learns that they went on a moonlight swim together Linda and David have to find new ways to meet, so Linda devises a system involving towels on her balcony to telegraph to David when it is safe to come up to her room. Robert now knows that his wife has a lover but suspects an innocent Frenchman. Amy, on the other hand, knows precisely what is going on and switches the towels to land David in trouble with a German couple.
6	6	"Forty Love"	Vernon Lawrence	Eric Chappell and Jean Warr	19 March 1984
David refuses to go with Amy to visit the ruins, saying he has already booked a court to play tennis with Linda. Robert still does not suspect, though he looks down on David anyway, seeing him as a social security scrounger holidaying at tax payers' expense. With Amy off to the ruins and Robert on the golf course the loved up couple move from the tennis court to the bedroom to indulge in a little afternoon delight. However, whilst they are kissing, in walks Amy, who takes her revenge with hot tea and sticky cakes.
7	7	"Hasta La Vista"	Vernon Lawrence	Eric Chappell and Jean Warr	26 March 1984
Their affair now out in the open, David and Linda plan to run off together. Robert wants to fight David but Amy uses subtler means, filling her husband's suitcase with hotel property so that he is arrested and then persuading Linda she had a lucky escape as he is a notorious kleptomaniac known as the Weasel. Whilst Linda happily returns to Robert, Amy, though she has squared things with the police, fails to tell David, subjecting him to further humiliation as he tries to flee the hotel in drag.

=== Series 2 (1984) ===
No. overall	No. in series	Title	Directed by	Written by	Original release date
8	1	"Mañana"	Vernon Lawrence	Eric Chappell and Jean Warr	6 September 1984
With Amy having sent all his clothes to the cleaners, David looks doomed to spend the rest of his holiday in drag, as he gets no sympathy from his wife or the Cochrans, though he does get chatted up by the waiter - who lends him a uniform so that he ends up serving drinks to Amy and Linda, both of whom reject him. However, after wrongly assuming that he has tried to drown himself, everybody feels very ashamed and are only too happy to see him again.
9	2	"Casino"	Vernon Lawrence	Eric Chappell and Jean Warr	13 September 1984
David goes to the casino where, meeting the Cochrans, he hopes Linda will bring him luck as he puts into play his winning system. In fact the novice Amy saves the day for him, raking in the chips, but he is boastful and ungenerous, declaring that he has a winning streak. The same thing happens on the next visit to the casino but this time round Amy is determined to get her fair share of the winnings.
10	3	"Couples"	Vernon Lawrence	Eric Chappell and Jean Warr	20 September 1984
A young English couple arrive at the hotel and Amy and Linda assume that they are newly-weds because they are so evidently in love. In fact they have been together for some years but play the newly-wed game to keep their marriage fresh. When they see Linda and David snatching an amorous moment together, they assume that they are another husband and wife playing the newly wed game and innocently spill the beans to Amy.
11	4	"El Astro"	Vernon Lawrence	Eric Chappell and Jean Warr	27 September 1984
Linda is delighted when her heart throb, soap actor Frazer Hines, books into the hotel but he only has eyes for Amy. She is initially unimpressed but, following some withering remarks from David, goes on a date with him. Ultimately both she and Linda end up hiding from their husbands in Frazer's room, each being discovered by the other's spouse.
12	5	"Pepe"	Vernon Lawrence	Eric Chappell and Jean Warr	4 October 1984
Returning from a boat trip to Tangiers, Amy is approached by a shifty -looking Spaniard who asks her to deliver a box allegedly containing the ashes of his dead friend Pepe to his widowed mother. David guesses, rightly, that Amy is being used to smuggle drugs and empties the box over their balcony - which leads to Robert and Linda getting stoned out of their heads.
13	6	"Snap"	Vernon Lawrence	Eric Chappell and Jean Warr	11 October 1984
David is less than happy to find that the obnoxious Kev Wilson, a man who has always done better than him and let him know it since childhood, is staying at the hotel and, as ever, worming his way into people's affections. Furthermore he keeps on taking photographs, including one of David kissing Linda which he gives to Amy. However, whilst Amy may not like Linda, she positively detests Kev and turns the tables on him by playing on Robert's jealousy.
14	7	"Adiós"	Vernon Lawrence	Eric Chappell and Jean Warr	18 October 1984
The last night of the holiday finds both couples packing but David and Linda decide to slip away and meet for one last time, away from the hotel. They go to Pedro's Bar where Linda gets pestered by a drunk and Amy turns up unexpectedly, closely followed by Robert. The Cochrans leave but Amy is still suspicious, and David must improvise as to why he is there. More improvisation is necessary when Amy leaves him with no money to pay the bill, which may account for his black eye on the plane home.

=== Series 3 (1986) ===
No. overall	No. in series	Title	Directed by	Written by	Original release date
15	1	"Winter Break"	Les Chatfield	Eric Chappell and Jean Warr	8 January 1986
Several months have passed. Amy is working but David is still unemployed and lies to her that his doctor has told him he will have a nervous breakdown unless he takes a holiday. He claims to be off to Spain with his old mate Tommy Wright but, once there, he meets up with Linda for a romantic reunion. However, before they can sip champagne in her room as planned both their spouses turn up.
16	2	"Déjà Vu"	Les Chatfield	Eric Chappell and Jean Warr	15 January 1986
David is caught out when Amy tells him that Tommy Wright has been dead for three years and both he and Linda adopt disguises to avoid the other's spouse as well as planning, unsuccessfully, to move to another hotel after pretending to find fault with the San Remo. Amy and Robert finally meet but when Amy learns that Robert's presence is as unexpected as her own she subjects David to her own brand of Deja Vu.
17	3	"Close Up"	Les Chatfield	Eric Chappell and Jean Warr	22 January 1986
The crew of television holiday programme 'Wish You Were Here...?' is at the hotel, along with its presenter Judith Chalmers. David and Amy are asked by Judith to say a few words into the microphone about the resort but David insists on Linda being included, as well as speaking in an affected accent, which provokes Amy into deliberately ruining their fifteen minutes of fame. The Cochrans are invited to replace them but Robert's rant against the Germans makes for equally unsuitable viewing.
18	4	"The Go-Between"	Les Chatfield	Eric Chappell and Jean Warr	29 January 1986
Neither Amy nor Robert can stand the gormless, accident-prone Neville so David and Linda decide to use him as a go-between and to keep their spouses at bay whilst Linda pretends she is teaching him to swim. As inept as a messenger as he is at everything else Neville innocently leads Amy to the lovers' rendezvous where she gets a shock and he gets a pleasant surprise, making it his best holiday ever.
19	5	"Costa del Crime"	Les Chatfield	Eric Chappell and Jean Warr	5 February 1986
Due to a mix-up David has ended up with a tartan hold-all identical to his own but one containing bundles of bank notes. He gives it to Linda to hide and when Robert finds it, he assumes David and Linda are planning to elope again. Meanwhile two sinister men arrive at the Pearces' room. They want their bag back and they aren't above throwing David off the balcony if he doesn't disclose its whereabouts. Fortunately Amy has done the right thing and handed the bag in to the police but David has kept some notes back for himself - suddenly it's raining money.
20	6	"Cause Célèbre"	Les Chatfield	Eric Chappell and Jean Warr	12 February 1986
When David buys a raffle ticket in aid of Conservative funds, Labour supporter Amy is shocked and accuses him of selling out the socialist principles he embraced when they first met. However, after Amy's attempts to support the over-worked, under-paid waiters results in Carlos getting sacked, it is not Amy's campaign, surprisingly supported by Linda, to get him reinstated that does the trick but David's stirring appeal to the other guests.
21	7	"Party Night"	Les Chatfield	Eric Chappell and Jean Warr	19 February 1986
The hotel throws a party where the guests must adopt fancy dress and perform on stage. Robert's monologue gets heckled by the Germans, whilst Amy, dressed as a clown, turns David and Linda's romantic duet into a total farce - though the audience assume it was meant to be funny. However, it is Amy's return to the stage in a totally different outfit that steals the show and even seems to have David hankering after her.

=== Christmas Special (1986) ===
No.	Title	Directed by	Written by	Original release date
22	"A Duty Free Christmas"	Les Chatfield	Eric Chappell and Jean Warr	25 December 1986
David persuades a reluctant Amy to spend Christmas in Spain, though in a more up-market hotel than the San Remo. When Amy sees the Cochrans, who are the guests of the wealthy Stoneleigh-Jacksons, she regards the trip as more than a coincidence but busies herself getting into the Christmas spirit by putting up decorations, forcing David to play Santa Claus and exchanging the expensive presents he has bought for Linda with cheap rubbish. Unsurprisingly David and Linda attempt to sneak off upstairs for some forbidden moments but, more surprisingly, they are not the couple seen finally kissing under the mistletoe.

== Trivia ==
The actor Frazer Hines, known for his former role in Emmerdale Farm as Joe Sugden, and television presenter Judith Chalmers made guest appearances in the series, playing themselves. The former was a hotel guest who tried to seduce Amy Pearce; the latter was filming an episode of Wish You Were Here...? from the hotel and interviewed the two couples.

It set viewing records for a sitcom at the time, regularly topping the UK TV ratings, and was nominated for a BAFTA for Best Comedy Series in 1986 alongside Only Fools and Horses, Yes, Prime Minister, 'Allo 'Allo!, Ever Decreasing Circles, and lost out to the winner, Just Good Friends.

In May 2015, both Gwen Taylor and Keith Barron played a couple again in an episode of the daytime soap opera Doctors.

== Last of the Duty Free - Play ==
Last of the Duty Free by Eric Chappell and Jean Warr is a theatrical sequel to the TV series. The scene is many years later in which, as before, deceptions, misunderstandings and preposterous situations abound. Gwen Taylor, Keith Barron and Neil Stacy returned to their previous roles when the play opened at The Royal Theatre, Windsor in April 2014.

On tour, the play's title was shortened to Duty Free.
