= St. Peter's School, Panchgani =

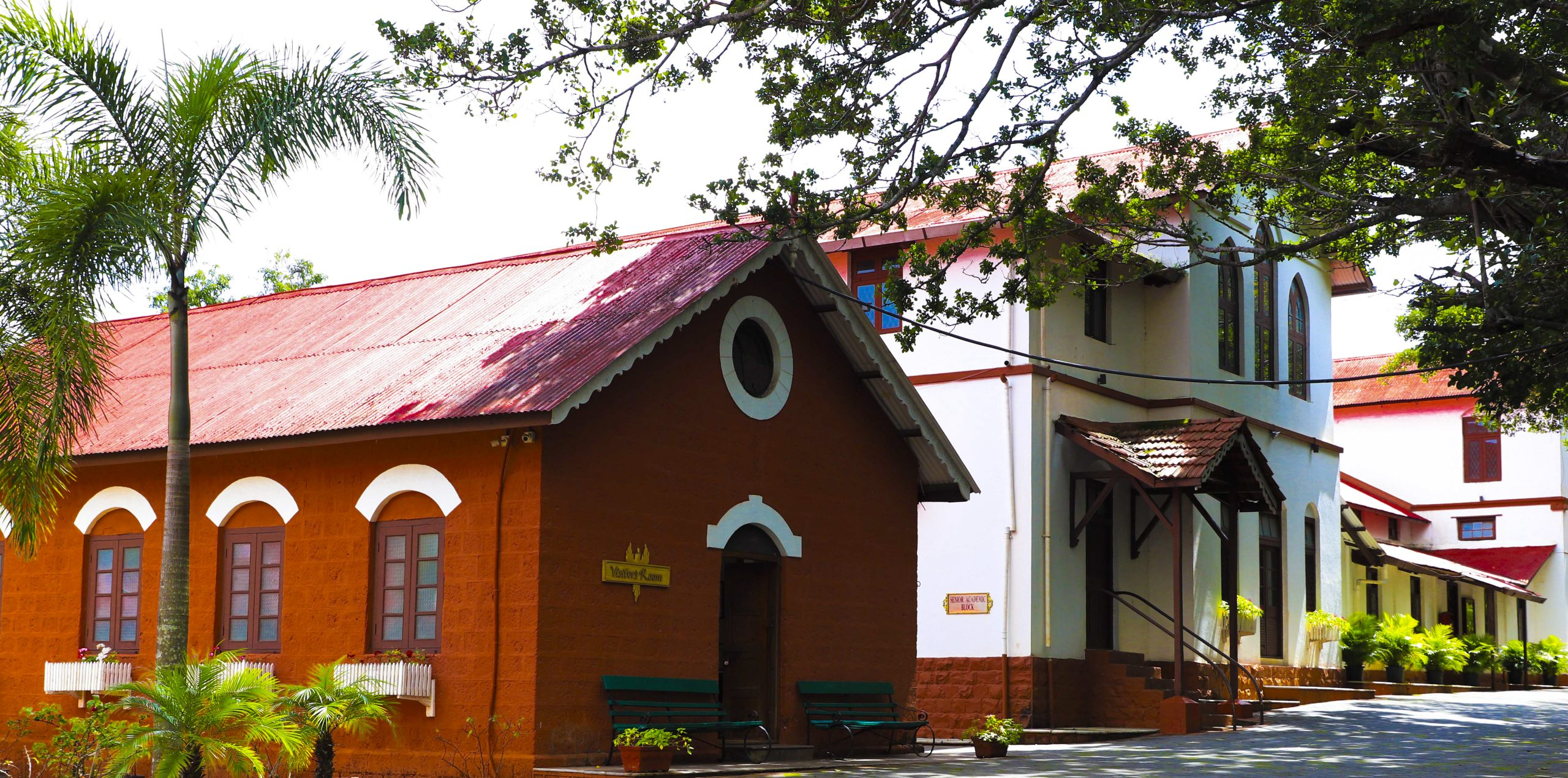
- Main entrance of St. Peter's School, Panchgani

Location
- Panchgani, Dist. Satara; Maharashtra, 412805; India; 17°55′16″N 73°47′35″E

Information
- Former name: European Boys' School
- Type: Private boarding school
- Motto: Ut Prosim (That I May Serve)
- Established: 1904; 122 years ago
- Founder: Mary Ashlin
- Sister school: Kimmins High School
- Oversight: Council for the Indian School Certificate Examinations
- Principal: Brian Robbins
- Grades: Class LKG – Class XII
- Gender: Co-educational
- Enrollment: Approximately 400 students
- Student to teacher ratio: 15:1
- Campus size: 58 acres
- Campus type: Hill station
- Houses: Ashlin; Cornwill; Drury; Rowan
- Colours: Maroon and Gold
- Mascot: Phoenix
- Affiliation: CISCE
- Website: St. Peter's School, Panchgani

St. Peter's School, Panchgani, is a Private, Co-educational Boarding school located in Panchgani, Maharashtra, India. Established in 1904 as the European Boys' School, it is affiliated with the Council for the Indian School Certificate Examinations (CISCE) and offers education up to Class X (ICSE).

The school is situated on a 58-acre hill campus in the Satara district and has historically been associated with the Anglo-Indian boarding school tradition in Western India. Although primarily a boarding institution, a limited number of day scholars are also admitted. The institution transitioned from an all-boys school to a co-educational boarding school during the 2020s.

Official school logo

The school emblem features a phoenix carrying an olive branch, symbolising renewal and peace, while the school motto, Ut Prosim ("That I May Serve"), reflects its emphasis on service and character formation.

The school maintains inter-house traditions and hosts annual cultural and sporting events. Notable alumni include musician Freddie Mercury, filmmaker Ram Madhvani, businessman Akbar Al Baker, comedian Sorabh Pant, and politician Udayanraje Bhosale.

== Houses ==
House	Named for	Colour	Motto
Ashlin	Mary Ashlin, former teacher	Green	Labore et virtue (Work is worship)
Cornwill	Rev. Cornelius Williams, former Principal	Red	Nil desperandum (Never despair)
Drury	Rev. J. Drury, former Principal	Blue	Facta, non verba (Action, not words)
Rowan	Rev. T. Rowan, former Principal	White and Black	Uno animo (United we stand)

== History ==
=== Origins ===
St. Peter's School, Panchgani (formerly known as the European Boys' School) was founded in 1902. The school was located at Kimmins School in its early stages. After receiving a generous donation from Miss Mary Ashlin (Lady Ashlin), the school was finally established in 1904 and moved to its own building (the current main school building) in 1904.

One landmark in the history of the school was the appointment of Mr. Oswald D Bason as Principal in 1947. He filled this position until his retirement in 1974. Another important change came about in 1967 when the management of the school passed into the hands of the Society of St. Peter's School, Panchgani.

=== Chronology ===
- 1861 The earliest European settlers in Panchgani, under Mr. J. Chesson, opened negotiations with the Government for the purchase of land for a church and school.
- 1876 Mr. Samuel Brierly, late Headmaster of Bishop's School, Poona, opened a Boarding and Day School at "Elstow", Panchgani.
- 1891 The Diocesan Board of Education, Bombay, became interested and appointed the Rev. Burgess, Chaplain/Headmaster. School opened at "Preston", but closed soon after due to a lawsuit over the property.
- 1895 The Rev. R. Evans, DD, was appointed by the Diocese to receive the School in "The Ark".
- 1898 Kimmins Girls' School founded by Miss A. Emilie Kimmins. Boys and girls studied together.
- 1902 Miss Mary Ashlin donated a legacy to the Colonial and Continental Church Society, London. The Society interested itself in the School at Panchgani and decided to govern the School with a Committee of Management at Bombay. Classes held in the nave of St. Peter's Church under the Rev. J. Redman. Boys housed at "Enfield" and "Albert House".
- 1904 Boys' School separates from Kimmins School. Present school buildings opened by Richard Stanley Heywood, Bishop of Mombasa.
- 1911 Assembly hall erected. Opened by Sir George Clark, Governor of Bombay.
- 1914 Middle Dormitory built.
- 1921 Rhodesia House and grounds purchased by the school. Death of Miss A. E. Kimmins, Founder of Kimmins Girls' School.
- 1934 Reference library constructed.
- 1937 Swimming bath constructed.
- 1940 Junior class-rooms constructed.
- 1947 Principal – Mr. O. D. Bason.
- 1950 "Maycroft" equipped for use as a school hospital.
- 1953 New kitchen built with financial assistance from the Sassoon David Trust.
- 1954 The school celebrated its Golden Jubilee (1904–1954). The dining hall was opened by the Rt. Rev. W. Q. Lash, Bishop of Bombay and Chairman of the Board of Governors.
- 1958 The "Albert House" estate was purchased at a cost of ₹75,000.
- 1959 "Maycroft" was purchased at a cost of ₹25,000.
- 1960 The school ceased to accept Government grants. "Flora House" was converted into a hostel. Gas was installed in the School kitchen.
- 1961 Modern sanitation was installed in School House. The school passed from the management of the Commonwealth & Continental Church Society to that of the Bombay Diocesan Society. A tablet commemorating the change was erected in the Assembly Hall. Maycroft Cottage was demolished and rebuilt at a cost of ₹10,000.
- 1961 Student Bruce Murray forms the band 'The Hectics' with Victory Rana, Farang Irani, Derrick Branche and Farrokh Bulsara (known as Freddie Mercury).
- 1962 Mr. J. L. Davis completed 25 years service at the school and was presented with a gold medal in appreciation of his services.
- 1963 An appeal for funds towards the cost of a new building to celebrate the School's Diamond Jubilee was launched. Fire in Principal's house.
- 1964 Work commenced on the new building. Estimated cost: ₹325,000. The School celebrated its Diamond Jubilee (1904–1964). The Rt. Rev. Christopher Robinson, Bishop of Bombay, unveiled a tablet to commemorate the occasion.
- 1966 Jubilee Hall completed.
- 1967 The Bombay Diocesan Trust Association hands over the management of St. Peter's School to the Society of St. Peter's School, Panchgani.
- 1967 Earthquake rocks Panchgani. Maycroft, Hill View and part of the kitchen are razed to the ground.
- 1969 Maycroft and Hill View cottages were reconstructed while the kitchen was repaired.
- 1974 Mr. O. D. Bason retires as principal after an innings of 27 years.
- 1974 Bason Hall dormitory and staff quarters constructed.
- 1975 Mr. Jack Timmins assumes the office of Principal.
- 1975 The St. Peter's School, Panchgani, Old Boys' Association is formed.
- 1980 Rhodesia renamed to Junior House on the Independence of Rhodesia.
- 1980–1981 Lower Field Stadium embankment is constructed – work is incomplete.
- 1981 Mr. Timmins migrates to Australia and Mr. Morris W. Innis takes over as principal.
- 1981 Last meeting of the Old Boys' Association.
- 1985 Mr. Ainsley L. Edgar appointed Vice Principal in May.
- 1986 Mr. O. D. Bason dies in Panchgani.
- 1987 Mr. Ainsley Edgar resigned in November.
- 1987 Computer studies introduced in the school.
- 1989 Lawrence Villa purchased for ₹15 lakhs.
- 1993 Ground floor of the Junior School block constructed.
- 1994 Latur earthquake rocks St. Peter's. Flora House and Albert House are badly damaged.
- 2000 Mr. Innis retires as principal. Mr. K. A. Garman takes his place.
- 2001 Mr. K. A. Garman resigns and Mr. R. Robinson takes his place.
- 2002 Mr. R. Robinson resigns and Miss Gilbert is appointed honorary Principal. Assembly Hall burns to the ground.
- 2003 Mr. Eugene Roscoe, vice Principal (April–September). Miss Gilbert (acting Principal) is succeeded by Mr. Gene Oscar Lee (junior school headmaster). The school could not appoint a Principal from 2001 to 2004 as Mr. K. A. Garman had taken the school to court over his unfair dismissal. In August 2003 Mr. Eugene Roscoe filed a case against the board of directors over his unfair dismissal and was awarded a massive sum of money in an out-of-court settlement.
- 2004 Centenary celebrations.
- 2005 New Assembly Hall dedicated.
- 2006 January Vice-Principal Joe L. Davis (1968) dies at the age of 88.
- 2007 Mr. G.O. Lee resigns as a Principal after 4 years
- 2007 Mr. Desmond D'Monte assumes the office of Headmaster in March, 2007. Mr. Desmond D'Monte resigns in January, 2009.
- 2009 Mr. Niteen Salvi takes over as acting headmaster (offg. headmaster)
- 2010 Dr. Thomas Charles Williams takes over as the new principal.
- 2010 Mrs. Sangita James takes over as the new principal.
- 2015 Mrs. Sangita James resigns as Principal after 5 years. Mr. Brian Robbins takes over as the principal.
- 2016 Dr. Wilfred Noronha takes over as the new principal.
- 2025: Mr. Alexander Coates Reid takes over as the new Principal.
- 2026: Mr. Brian Robbins takes over as the new Principal.

== Campus ==
St. Peter's School is situated on a 58-acre hill campus in Panchgani in the Satara district of Maharashtra. The campus includes academic buildings, boarding dormitories, sports grounds, a chapel, and recreational facilities, reflecting the institution's long-standing boarding school tradition.

The school maintains multiple playgrounds and sports fields, along with a multipurpose court used primarily for basketball and other sporting activities. Facilities on campus include a library, a gymnasium, and an in-house infirmary with full-time nursing staff and visiting medical practitioners.

The boarding infrastructure of the school consists of several dormitories, including Rhodesia, Jubilee Hall, Bason Hall, Albert House, Flora House, Lawrence Villa, and Maycroft. Some of these structures date back to the colonial period and remain associated with the architectural heritage of the campus.

== Cultural legacy ==
St. Peter's School has been associated with several notable figures in the fields of music, cinema, business, comedy, politics, and public service.

One of the school's most internationally recognised alumni is musician Freddie Mercury, lead vocalist of the rock band Queen. During his years at St. Peter's School, Mercury was part of a student band known as The Hectics, which is regarded as one of his earliest musical projects.

The school campus contains memorabilia and archival material connected to Mercury and his time at the institution.

== Notable alumni ==
- Freddie Mercury – singer, songwriter, record producer, and lead vocalist of the rock band Queen.
- Akbar Al Baker – businessman and former group chief executive officer of Qatar Airways.
- Anmol Vellani – founder-director of the India Foundation for the Arts, theatre director, and writer.
- Derrick Branche – British actor.
- Ram Madhvani – filmmaker and advertising director.
- Sameer Iqbal Patel - Bollywood writer and director
- Sorabh Pant – stand-up comedian and writer.
- Udayanraje Bhosale – current Chhatrapati, politician and member of the Rajya Sabha.

== Community and archives ==
The school maintains a digital archive of historical yearbooks and photographs known as the Phoenix Archives.

An alumni registration platform titled Ut Prosim is maintained by the institution's alumni network.

== See also ==
- Kimmins High School
- Freddie Mercury
