= Geraldine Newman =

English film and television actress

- Born: Geraldine Newman; 18 February 1934 (age 92); Brighton, Sussex, England
- Spouse: David Garth (died 1988)

Geraldine Newman (born 18 February 1934) is an English film and television actress who has acted in more than 30 television programmes and films.

== Career ==
Newman attended drama school in Brighton. She is best known for her role as Hilda Hughes in the 1980s BBC TV series, Ever Decreasing Circles which ran from 1984 to 1987 with an extended Christmas series finale in December 1989.

== Personal life ==
She was married to fellow English actor David Garth, who was 14 years her senior, until his death in 1988.

== Filmography ==
=== Films ===
Year	Title	Role
1970	All the Way Up	Makepiece's Secretary
1997	Breakout	Neighbour

=== Television ===
Year	Title	Role
1962–66	Dr. Finlay's Casebook	Mary Davidson
1964	Crossroads	Constance Merrow
1969–70	Dear Mother...Love Albert	Mrs. McKewan
1977	Backs to the Land	Miss Rainbow
1979	Lovely Couple	Madge Dent
1984–89	Ever Decreasing Circles	Hilda Hughes
1985–86	Mapp & Lucia	Grosvenor
1987	Sleeping Murder	Janet Erskine
1993	Keeping Up Appearances	Ladies Luncheon Committee chairlady
