= London (TV series) =

- Genre: Docurama
- Presented by: Peter Ackroyd
- Starring: see below
- No. of series: 1
- No. of episodes: 3

Original release
- Network: BBC Two
- Release: 7 May – 21 May 2004

London is a 2004 three-part BBC history documentary series about the history of London, presented by Peter Ackroyd.

== Cast list ==
The series made a visual trope of, as Ackroyd walked around London or was sitting in his study, the persons of famous and anonymous historical figures would fade in and out and act their testimonies. These were played, in alphabetical order, by:-

- Tyler Butterworth .... Merry Andrew
- Jim Carter .... Henry Fielding
- Michael Feast .... Christopher Wren
- William Forde .... Young Thomas de Quincey
- Tom Hollander .... T. S. Eliot
- Philip Jackson .... Samuel Pepys
- Derek Jacobi .... Tacitus
- Alex Jennings .... Stephen Spender
- Kara Kyne .... Jane Alsop
- Chris Langham .... Ned Ward
- Anton Lesser .... Charles Dickens
- Philip Madoc .... Geoffrey of Monmouth
- Joseph McFadden .... James Boswell
- Tim Pigott-Smith .... John Evelyn
- Amanda Root .... Charlotte Brontë
- Jack Shepherd .... Thomas de Quincey
- John Simm .... Friedrich Engels
- Toby Stephens .... Casanova
- Richard Stockwell .... Young Peter Ackroyd
- Ronan Vibert .... Joseph Conrad
- Harriet Walter .... Virginia Woolf
- Don Warrington .... Ignatius Sancho
- Timothy West .... Henry Mayhew
- John Woodvine .... Henry Moore

== Episodes ==
No.	Title	Topics	Directed by	Original release date
1	"Fire and Destiny"	Boudicca, Great Fire of London, Blitz	Chris Granlund	7 May 2004
2	"Crowd"	Riots, Peasants' Revolt, Gordon Riots	Roger Parsons	14 May 2004
3	"Water and Darkness"	Sewers, River Thames, London Bridge, Springheeled Jack	Sam Hobkinson	21 May 2004
