= Fiddlers Three (TV series) =

British TV sitcom (1991)

- Genre: Sitcom
- Written by: Eric Chappell
- Directed by: Graham Wetherell
- Starring: Peter Davison; Paula Wilcox; Charles Kay; Peter Blake; Tyler Butterworth; Cindy Marshall-Day
- Country of origin: United Kingdom
- Original language: English
- No. of series: 1
- No. of episodes: 14

Production
- Executive producer: Vernon Lawrence
- Producer: Graham Wetherell
- Running time: 30 minutes (including adverts)
- Production company: Yorkshire Television

Original release
- Network: ITV
- Release: 19 February – 21 May 1991

Fiddlers Three is a British sitcom series produced by Yorkshire Television for ITV which ran for 14 episodes from 19 February to 21 May 1991. Written by Eric Chappell and directed by Graham Wetherell, it stars Peter Davison as Ralph West, Paula Wilcox as Ros West, Charles Kay as J.J. Morley, Peter Blake as Harvey, Tyler Butterworth as Osborne and Cindy Marshall-Day as Norma.

The sitcom is about office politics in an accounts department in Wakefield, West Yorkshire.

It is a remake of Chappell's earliest sitcom, The Squirrels, broadcast from 1974 to 1977, excluding the scripts written by other writers.

== Cast ==
- Peter Davison as Ralph West
- Paula Wilcox as Ros West
- Charles Kay as J.J. Morley
- Peter Blake as Harvey
- Tyler Butterworth as Osborne
- Cindy Marshall-Day as Norma

== Episodes ==
No.	Title	Original release date
1	"The Scapegoat"	19 February 1991
2	"Norma Dove"	26 February 1991
3	"The Dark Horse"	5 March 1991
4	"The Whiz Kid"	12 March 1991
5	"The Velvet Glove"	19 March 1991
6	"Detective Story"	26 March 1991
7	"Time Out"	2 April 1991
8	"The Secret File"	9 April 1991
9	"The Man Most Likely To"	16 April 1991
10	"We Don't Want to Lose You: Part 1"	23 April 1991
11	"We Don't Want to Lose You: Part 2"	30 April 1991
12	"The Fiddle"	7 May 1991
13	"Undue Influence"	14 May 1991
14	"Cut and Dried"	21 May 1991
