= Stanley Lebor =

English actor (1934-2014)

- Born: Stanley Harvey Lebor; 24 September 1934; East Ham, London, England
- Died: 22 November 2014 (aged 80); Faversham, Kent, England
- Occupations: Stage, film and television actor

Stanley Harvey Lebor (24 September 1934 – 22 November 2014) was an English actor. He was best known for his roles as Howard Hughes in the 1980s BBC TV comedy series Ever Decreasing Circles, the Mongon Doctor in Flash Gordon (1980), and as RSM Lord in A Bridge Too Far (1977). Before this he was better known for villainous roles in series such as Jason King and The Tomorrow People.

== Life ==
Lebor was born in East Ham, London. He studied acting at RADA in London. In 1961 he joined the Radio Drama Company by winning the Carleton Hobbs Bursary.

He appeared in Minder in the Series 1 episode The Bengal Tiger, The Naked Civil Servant, Ever Decreasing Circles, Tarka the Otter, Gandhi, Grange Hill, 'Allo 'Allo!, Superman IV: The Quest for Peace and Last of the Summer Wine. In 1986 he acted with Lynda Baron in a party political broadcast for the SDP–Liberal Alliance.

== Filmography ==
- The Deadly Affair (1966) – Lancaster (in "Edward II") (uncredited)
- Oh! What a Lovely War (1969) – Soldier in Gassed Trench (uncredited)
- Arthur? Arthur! (1969) – Analyst
- Crossplot (1969) – First policeman
- Up the Front (1972) – Blitzen
- Nothing But the Night (1973) – Policeman
- Soft Beds, Hard Battles (1974) – 1st Gestapo Agent
- I Don't Want to Be Born (1975) – Police Sergeant
- Hennessy (1975) – Hawk
- The Naked Civil Servant (1975) – Mr. Pole
- A Bridge Too Far (1977) – Regimental Sergeant Major
- The Medusa Touch (1978) – Police Doctor
- Tarka the Otter (1979) – Farm Labourer
- Flash Gordon (1980) – Mongon Doctor
- Gandhi (1982) – Police Officer
- Ha-Kala (1985) – Ziggy
- Personal Services (1987) – Jones
- Superman IV: The Quest for Peace (1987) – General Romoff
- La Passione (1996) – Harry Lambert
- Arabian Nights (2000) – Faisal

== TV credits ==
- Elizabeth R - Episode 1: "The Lion's Cub" - Sir Robert Tyrwhitt (1971)
- Man of Straw – Herr Cohn (1972)
- The Protectors – Medina (1972)
- The Tomorrow People – Gaius (1974)
- Star Maidens – Carlo (1976)
- The Brothers - Faulkner (episode: "To Honour And Obey", 1976)
- 1990 – Digger Radford (1978)
- Return of the Saint - Dalby (episode: "The Nightmare Man", 1978)
- Holocaust – Zalman (1978)
- Minder – Wilson (1979)
- Shoestring – Restaurant Manager (1980)
- Hammer House of Horror – Charles (episode: "Visitor From The Grave", 1980)
- Grange Hill – Mr. Durrant (1983)
- Ever Decreasing Circles – Howard Hughes (1984-1989)
- "Allo Allo
- Last of the Summer Wine – Bramwell (episode: "The Phantom No 14 Bus", 1999)
