= Michael Benz =

English-American actor

- Born: 1981 or 1982 (age 43–44); England
- Education: Georgetown University; Royal Academy of Dramatic Art
- Occupation: Actor

Michael Benz (born 1981 or 1982) is an English-American actor.

== Early life and education ==
Benz was born in England to American parents Thomas and Margaret Benz. He attended The American School in London before graduating from Georgetown University in 2004 and the Royal Academy of Dramatic Art in London in 2007.

== Career ==
Benz was cast as Mike in the popular British sci-fi TV sitcom Mike and Angelo. Benz participated in six series of the program and appears in 60 episodes. Benz has also provided voice work for the British-American animated adventure comedy film We're Back! A Dinosaur's Story. Benz also appeared as the title character in the BBC 6-part miniseries Little Lord Fauntleroy, based on the English children's novel by Frances Hodgson Burnett, and adapted by Julian Fellowes. Upon graduation from RADA, Benz made his professional stage debut in the Shakespeare's Globe production of The Winter's Tale playing Paulina and the Young Shepherd. Also for Shakespeare's Globe, Benz appeared in Love's Labour's Lost, As You Like It, and the world premiere production of A New World: A Life of Thomas Paine. In the summer of 2012, Benz played the title role in the Globe's production of Hamlet, directed by artistic director Dominic Dromgoole and Bill Buckhurst. During the fall of 2012, the production toured the United States and Benz was nominated for Outstanding Lead Actor at the Helen Hayes Awards in Washington, DC. Benz made his West End theatre debut in 2011 playing Horatio in Trevor Nunn's production of Rosencrantz & Guildenstern Are Dead at the Theatre Royal, Haymarket. Benz worked with Nunn again later that year, playing Ferdinand opposite Ralph Fiennes' Prospero, in The Tempest also at Theatre Royal, Haymarket. Other stage appearances by Benz include Lee Baum in Arthur Miller's The American Clock and Christopher in the premiere of Oohrah! by Bekah Brunstetter, both at the Finborough Theatre; Simon Bliss in Noël Coward's Hay Fever at the West Yorkshire Playhouse; and Balthasar in Romeo & Juliet for the Royal Shakespeare Company (RSC). Benz was a guest player in the season four Christmas Special of Downton Abbey that was broadcast on 25 December 2013 in the UK (season 4, episode 9 in the US). Benz played Ethan, the American valet to guest star Paul Giamatti's character Harold Levinson. In 2019, Benz played a Wall Street executive in the thriller Joker, in which his character is harassing Arthur on the Subway.

== Filmography ==
=== Film ===
Year	Title	Role	Notes
1993	We're Back! A Dinosaur's Story		Voice role
2009	Sam and Jenny Go to a Play	Old Sage	Short
2010	'As You Like It' at Shakespeare's Globe Theatre	Silvius	
2010	The Newest Pledge	Futuristic Party Go-er	
2012	City Slacker	Well Presented Man	
2015	The Importance of Being Earnest LIVE	John Worthing	
2016	Snowden	CIA Student	
2017	The Wife	White	
2019	Joker	Wall Street Three	
2020	Greyhound	Lieutenant Carling	

=== Television ===
Year	Title	Role	Notes
1993-1998	Mike and Angelo	Mike Mason	Series regular
1994	The Tomorrow People	Vinny	Episode: "The Monsoon Man"
1995	Little Lord Fauntleroy	Cedric Errol	Mini-series
2013	Downton Abbey	Ethan Slade	Episode: "The London Season"
2017	Time After Time	Smythe	Episode: "Pilot"
2021	For All Mankind	Gary Piscotty	7 episodes
