= Derrick Branche =

British actor (born 1947)

- Born: 1947 (age 78–79); Bombay, India
- Occupations: Actor, guitarist
- Years active: 1979–2002
- Known for: Only When I Laugh, My Beautiful Laundrette, guitarist for The Hectics

Derrick Branche (born 1947) is a British former actor and musician, best known for his role in the film My Beautiful Laundrette and television roles in The Jewel in the Crown and Only When I Laugh.

== Early life and education ==
Branche was born in 1947 in Bombay (now Mumbai), India, and educated at St. Peter's School, a boarding school for boys in Panchgani near Bombay. Freddie Mercury was his classmate in the school, with whom he formed The Hectics, Mercury's first band, from 1959 to 1962. Branche was the band's guitarist.

== Filmography ==
Film appearances
Year	Title	Role	Notes
1979	Bloodline	Chemin-de-fer Player	
1979	The Golden Lady	Ahmed Zamani	
1985	My Beautiful Laundrette	Salim	
1986	Tai-Pan	Vargas	
1987	The Sicilian	Terranova	
2002	The Wonderland Experience	Dee	(final film role)

Television appearances
Year	Title	Role	Notes
1978	Blake's 7	Amagon Guard	1 episode
1979–1981	Only When I Laugh	Nurse Gupte	22 episodes
1984	The Jewel in the Crown	Ahmed Kasim	6 episodes
1988	The Comic Strip Presents...	Chris Bell	1 episode
1995	Father Ted	Father Jose Fernandez	1 episode
