= Mike and Angelo =

British children's TV sitcom (1989–2000)

- Genre: Sitcom
- Created by: Grant Cathro; Lee Pressman
- Written by: Grant Cathro; Lee Pressman; Alex Bartlette
- Starring: Shelley Thompson; Matt Wright; Tyler Butterworth; Tim Whitnall; Michael Benz; Katy Murphy; Gemma Gregory; Steven Geller
- Composers: Alan Coates; Kim Goody
- Country of origin: United Kingdom
- Original language: English
- No. of series: 12
- No. of episodes: 123

Production
- Running time: 20 minutes
- Production companies: Thames (1989-91); Tetra Films and Carlton (1993-2000)

Original release
- Network: ITV (CITV)
- Release: 16 March 1989 – 7 March 2000

Mike and Angelo is a British children's science fiction sitcom that aired on CITV between 16 March 1989 and 7 March 2000. The show is ITV's longest running sitcom (as per series count).

== Plot ==
The shows initially centred on Mike King (played by Matt Wright), and his mother Rita moving to London from the United States after she divorces Mike's father. In their new house, and feeling lonely in his new surroundings, Mike discovers a mysterious wardrobe. It bursts open containing Angelo (Tyler Butterworth), an alien who came from another world; the portal being the wardrobe. Angelo has no knowledge of life on Earth or of his own - so relies on the help of Mike to understand the world he has crashed on. At the same time, Mike is in turn helped by Angelo to integrate into life in London.

Episodes center on Mike and Angelo's adventures in their house. Angelo's general misunderstanding of human behaviour and daily life lead the two into various comedic situations.

The series frequently featured guest actors in various roles. Some actors which appeared in the show include: Ron Moody, John Savident, Christopher Ryan, Brian Murphy and Anthony O'Donnell.

== History ==
=== Development ===
The title of the series is a play on the name of the painter Michelangelo. In the early planning stages of the series, creators Grant Cathro and Lee Pressman had toyed with the idea of making Angelo somehow a guardian angel towards Mike. They were inspired by Michelangelo's The Creation of Adam. Although the idea of the guardian angel was ultimately unutilised in the series, they liked the name-play and stuck with it.

Writers Lee Pressman and Grant Cathro set Mike & Angelo in Cricklewood, London - which would also later be the setting of their later series Spatz.

=== Thames Television era (series 1-4) ===
The tone of the first two series was more comedy-drama (early episodes were even billed as a drama.) Several episodes of the first series focussed on the loneliness Mike was feeling after moving to a different country which was helped by his new friendship with Angelo. The original two series featured a quirky, whimsical flute-led theme tune on the opening and closing credits, written by Jim Parker.

The first changes to the show would occur with repeats of the first two series in 1990. The original theme tune was replaced by the version which would later be used from Series 3 onwards, written by David Stafford, as well as a new opening credits narration (read by Matt Zimmerman), also used from Series 3, was also added to these repeated episodes. Additionally, a laugh track was added, which would until the end of the show's run, was also dubbed on, where it had not originally been present. These changes to the originally shown versions were in part to make the series more 'uniform', as Children's ITV had hoped to sell the series to stations in America; a plan which never fully came to fruition.

Series 3 would feature the first of the show's many cast changes, with Tim Whitnall replacing Tyler Butterworth as Angelo. In the first episode of the series, Angelo falls ill and eventually "regenerates" (borrowing a concept first used in Doctor Who). Tim Whitnall would remain as the character for the rest of the programme's run. At around this point, the comedy drama tone of the first two series began to be shifted towards the more fantastical and farcical, with Angelo creating many inventions which typically run out of control, and occasionally summoning up historical figures from the past.

Mike King moves back to the US at the beginning of Series 4 to be with his dad, with Ellie, a young neighbour, filling the gap left by the character for the rest of Series 4, befriending Angelo and getting caught up with his various gadgets and escapades.

=== Tetra Films era (series 5-12) ===
Mike and Angelo was recommissioned in 1992 by Carlton Television for a fifth series, after Thames Television lost its ITV franchise. Series 5 would be produced by Tetra Films, and featured a new theme composed by Kim Goody and Alan Coates, which would remain, in several slight variations, for the remainder of the show's run. Rita's nephew Mike Mason (Michael Benz) is introduced - as well being in keeping with the title of the series (despite the character of Ellie in Series 4), Benz would become the longest-running "Mike" character, featuring in 6 of the 12 series.

By the start of Series 7, Rita has decided to return to the USA. Her place was filled by new character Katy Andrews (Katy Murphy), a new housekeeper.

Series 11 saw the exit of Michael Benz, and the series began with Angelo and Katy reading a postcard explaining that Mike was having a good time in America after returning there. In his place, recurring neighbour character Daphne Fawkes-Bentley's niece Mickey (Gemma Gregory) became Angelo's sidekick.

For the final series, Katy's nephew - also called Mike (Steven Geller), joined. Geller later died in 2015 aged 30.

Although the series never came to an official conclusion, it was not renewed after Series 12 (2000) due to it being felt that the series had run its course, and because of a shift in Children's ITV's audience demographic.

== Cast and characters ==
=== Main ===
- Angelo - Tyler Butterworth (1989–1990) & Tim Whitnall (1990–2000):
  Angelo is a goofy but kind-hearted alien from the planet of Ptarg. He has the ability to make crazy inventions for his friends and among other things, is able to walk on the ceiling.
- Mike King - Matt Wright (1989–1991):
  The original Mike, American teenager Mike King discovers Angelo and helps him accustom to life on Earth - all while ensuring no-one finds out his secret.
- Rita King - Shelley Thompson (1989–1994):
  Rita is the owner of the house and Mike's mother. She is aware of Angelo and helps her son keep him a secret from visitors to the house.
- Mike Mason - Michael Benz (1993–1998):
  The second and longest-appearing Mike, Mike Mason is the nephew of Rita.
- Katy Andrews - Katy Murphy (1995–2000):
  The quick-tempered but good-natured Scottish housekeeper, who takes over looking after the house in addition to seeking work as an actress. She lands a big Hollywood role at the end of her first season, but returns to her housekeeping job soon afterwards.
- Michaela "Mickey" Fawkes-Bentley - Gemma Gregory (1999):
  The niece of posh neighbour Daphne, Mickey is more fun-loving than her aunt.
- Mike - Steven Geller (2000):
  The final Mike and Katy's nephew, he is snarky and intended to act as a Straight man to Angelo. How he came to be staying with them was never explained.

=== Supporting ===
- Cyril Pinner - John Levitt (1989–1994):
  A nosey neighbour, Mr Pinner is suspicious of the events happening next door.
- Philippa Fraser - Alessia Gwyther (1989–1991):
  A young snooty neighbour who attempts to befriend Mike King.
- Brett Douglas - Gavin Richards (1989–1993):
  Rita's friend who is suspicious of Angelo.
- Nancy Mancini (Rita King's mother) - Libby Morris (1989–1991):
  Sassy and a gossip, she stays occasionally in the house.
- Tony King (Rita King's former husband) - Jeff Harding (1989–1991):
  Father of Mike King who has a strained relationship with Rita.
- Ellie - Jade Magri (1991):
  Neighbourhood girl who helps Angelo in Series 4.
- Melanie Pinner - Alexandra Milman (1993–1994):
  Mike Mason's girlfriend in Series 5 and 6, niece of Mr Pinner.
- Uncle Bob - Ron Berglas (1995):
  Uncle of Mike Mason who checks in on Mike, Angelo and Katy regularly in Series 7.
- Sam - Katie Pearson (1995):
  Mike Mason's girlfriend in Series 7.
- Daphne Fawkes-Bentley - Elizabeth Estensen (1995–2000):
  The stuck-up neighbour and aunt of Mickey. Played by Elizabeth Estensen, who portrayed the first T-Bag in fellow Pressman and Cathro show T-Bag. As a result, much of Daphne's character is in reference to the character of T-Bag.
- Zoe - Candace Hallinan (1998):
  Mike Mason's rather snarky girlfriend in Series 9 and 10.

== Transmissions ==
Series	Start date	End date	Episodes
1	16 March 1989	18 May 1989	10
2	14 September 1989	16 November 1989	10
3	14 November 1990	13 February 1991	13
4	17 October 1991	19 December 1991	10
5	7 January 1993	11 March 1993	10
6	22 February 1994	26 April 1994	10
7	5 January 1995	9 March 1995	10
8	4 January 1996	7 March 1996	10
9	9 January 1997	13 March 1997	10
10	8 January 1998	12 March 1998	10
11	5 January 1999	16 March 1999	10
12	4 January 2000	7 March 2000	10

=== Old Skool Weekend ===
In 2013, two episodes of Mike & Angelo were repeated on CITV as part of its 30th anniversary Old Skool Weekend:

- The first, shown on 5 January 2013, entitled "Fuzzball", had originally been broadcast on CITV on 26 October 1989
- The second, shown on 6 January 2013, was titled "Heirs And Graces", and had originally been broadcast on CITV on 7 March 1996.
