= Elizabeth Bennett (actress) =

British actor

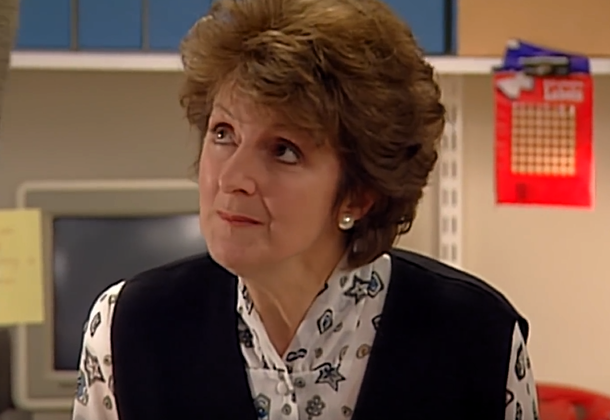
- Bennett in "Goodnight Mr. Bean" (1995) from Mr. Bean: Live Action Series
- Born: Yorkshire, England
- Years active: 1969–present
- Known for: Heartbeat

Elizabeth Bennett is a British actress and television producer. She is best known for her long recurring role as Joyce Jowett in the long-running ITV series Heartbeat.

Bennett has appeared in several other British television series, including The Sandbaggers, The Bill, The Lakes, Diana, Chef!, Dangerfield, The Duchess of Duke Street, Lady Killers, Bergerac (Series 2, Episode 9, "The Moonlight Girls"), Down to Earth, Lovejoy (Series 2, Episode 6, "One Born Every Minute"; as Alison Jukes), Within These Walls (Series 3, Episode 7, "A Lurking Doubt"; as wrongly accused inmate Ruth Brown) and The Last Detective. In Diana, she played the title character's mother, aging from 30 to 60.

Bennett's first role in sitcom was in the British comedy Home to Roost, in which she played housekeeper Enid Thompson. As of 1986, she was commuting between England and the United States to play the same character in the show's American remake, You Again?, which aired on NBC.

Bennett also appeared in the television film Margaret (2009), and also played the role of Miss Pennywinkle in the French language films Largo Winch and its sequel Largo Winch II, both based on the Belgian comic book series.

She studied acting in London and started her acting career at the Old Vic Theatre in Bristol.
