= The Hectics =

Freddie Mercury's first band

- Origin: Panchgani, Bombay, India
- Genres: Various
- Years active: 1958–1962
- Past members: Freddie Mercury; Derrick Branche; Bruce Murray; Victory Rana; Farang Irani

The Hectics was an Indian school band. The members of the band were Farrokh Bulsara (later known as Freddie Mercury) (pianist), Derrick Branche (guitarist), Bruce Murray (lead vocalist and guitarist), Victory Rana (drummer) and Farang Irani (bass). The school band was formed while all five were students at St. Peter's School, Panchgani, an English boarding school in Panchgani, near Bombay (now Mumbai), India.

== Aftermath ==
Freddie Mercury went on to become the lead vocalist of the rock band Queen.

Derrick Branche went on to appear in British films such as My Beautiful Laundrette and television shows such as Only When I Laugh, The Comic Strip Presents... and Father Ted.

Bruce Murray currently runs The Music Centre in Bedford, England. His step-son Guy Griffin plays with British rock band The Quireboys.

Victory Rana became a general in the Nepalese army and headed a UN peacekeeping force in Cyprus.

Farang Irani joined his family's restaurant business and ran Bounty Sizzlers, a Pune restaurant. His daughters now run the restaurant as he has since died.
