= Ever Decreasing Circles =

British TV sitcom (1984–1989)

- Opening titles of Ever Decreasing Circles
- Genre: British sitcom
- Created by: John Esmonde; Bob Larbey
- Based on: Hiccups (stage play)
- Directed by: Sydney Lotterby (13 episodes) Harold Snoad (14 episodes)
- Starring: Richard Briers; Penelope Wilton; Peter Egan; Stanley Lebor; Geraldine Newman
- Opening theme: Prelude No. 15 from Twenty-four Preludes, Op. 34
- Composer: Dmitri Shostakovich
- Country of origin: United Kingdom
- Original language: English
- No. of series: 4
- No. of episodes: 27

Production
- Running time: 30 minutes

Original release
- Network: BBC1
- Release: 29 January 1984 – 24 December 1989

Ever Decreasing Circles is a British sitcom which ran on BBC1 between 29 January 1984 and 24 December 1989, consisting of four series and one feature-length special. It was written by John Esmonde and Bob Larbey, and it reunited them with Richard Briers, who had starred in their previous sitcom The Good Life.

It was made towards the end of a run of British comedies focussing on the aspirational middle class, with The Guardian describing it as having "a quiet, unacknowledged and deep-running despair to it that in retrospect seems quite daring".

== Synopsis ==
Richard Briers plays Martin Bryce, an obsessive, middle-aged man at the centre of his local suburban community in Mole Valley, Surrey. This relatively unsympathetic character was the antithesis of Tom Good. Briers said that it was his favourite sitcom role. The show's signature running gag (which appeared in almost every episode) was Martin walking past the telephone in his hallway and turning the receiver around.

Martin is married to the domesticated and patient Ann (Penelope Wilton) and has a settled, orderly lifestyle until he encounters their new next-door neighbour, ex-British Army officer and Cambridge Blue Paul Ryman (Peter Egan). Paul is everything Martin is not – adventurous, laissez-faire, flippant, witty, handsome and charming; in the words of Martin, a "couldn't care less, come on life ... amuse me, merchant". Paul can not only call upon the services of an endless number of "mates" from numerous walks of life who are more than willing to do him a favour, but also claims to be on friendship terms with a number of celebrities (Sean Connery, Tony Meo, John Dankworth etc). This further isolates Martin, whose friend base is quite limited, to the extent that it becomes an obsession. Paul attempts to join in with the activities of Martin and his friends, but his fresh thinking causes Martin to see him as a rival who might want to "take over" Martin's self-appointed role as organiser. Martin's obsession with order and stability also leads him to get upset at Paul's minor changes to routine, such as sitting at a different table in the local pub. Paul runs his own business, a hair salon, (which Martin always refers to as a 'barbers'), and later, a health studio. Martin, by contrast, has a humdrum white-collar job at Mole Valley Valves, a local company.

The other regular characters were Howard and Hilda Hughes (Stanley Lebor and Geraldine Newman), another married couple who generally add lighter humour to the plots. They are long-standing friends and neighbours of Martin's, who share some of his obsessiveness whilst having plenty of quirks of their own (such as often wearing "his and hers" matching outfits), but are also attracted by Paul's personality. Although Howard and Hilda are often seen as being rather timid, they have strong moral values and can be very forthright in chastising other characters (usually Martin or Paul) when they believe them to have done something wrong.

An undercurrent running throughout the series is the unresolved sexual tension and flirting between Paul and Ann. Martin sometimes seems oblivious to the attraction between Ann and Paul but in one episode, he wrongly believes that they have run off together. Martin leaves home, leaving Ann a note wishing her happiness and stating that he will always love her. Graham Rinaldi notes that "Briers' performance is poignant and genuinely moving as he wrestles with the character's inner turmoil." Martin's relationship with Paul is double-edged. Paul is always friendly to Martin, who veers between thinly disguised hatred and grudging admiration. Paul also solves a marital crisis in one episode when Martin is tricked by a colleague into believing he has had a drunken one-night stand while away on business and admitting to Ann his infidelity. Paul cons the colleague into an admission of the trick in front of Ann, restoring her faith in Martin.

Central to the show is Martin's envy of Paul. Paul is shown to be significantly better than Martin at many things, notably cricket, where Paul joins the local team and promptly smashes all the records that Martin proudly holds. The two later play in a snooker tournament, where Martin is delighted to find that Paul is useless (the tournament coincides with Howard's anger at being seen as "a loser", causing him to defeat Martin in the final). A parallel is drawn with an incident from Martin's childhood in which his own "gang" was taken over by a new boy.

An example of Paul's seeming success is when he arranges to have a load of garden manure delivered to his address where he offers residents to help themselves. The load is mistakenly dumped on Martins driveway whilst Paul is away playing in a golf tournament. Hilda, thinking that she is helping, hires a skip which is also delivered outside Martin's house. However, in doing so, Hilda mistakenly thinks that it also comes with workmen to fill it. Martin fruitlessly tries to have the manure and skip removed without result. On his return, Paul takes a mere thirty minutes to arrange to have both taken away. The (manure removal) tractor breaks down outside Martin's house, and despite his attempts to rectify the fault he fails. Paul, who has been at his salon, returns, and Martin challenges him to sort the problem. Paul claims to know nothing about mechanics, and asks Martin, "What would you like me to do Martin? Enchant the engine?". Martin, believing that he now has the upper hand, challenges Paul further. So Paul merely points at the engine and it starts immediately, leaving Martin dumbfounded.

The show also featured guest appearances by Peter Blake, Ronnie Stevens, Victoria Burgoyne, Timothy Bateson, Ray Winstone, Pamela Salem, and Suzan Crowley.

After four series, Ever Decreasing Circles ended on Christmas Eve 1989 with an 81-minute finale entitled "Moving On" ("New Horizons", on the DVD release) in which Martin's employer, Mole Valley Valves, merges with another company (Lee Valley Valves) and moves to Oswestry. Ann discovers she is pregnant and, despite Martin initially resenting the unborn child for forcing him to move away from The Close, the story ends with the couple bidding farewell to their neighbours. The final scene sees Martin standing in his empty hallway, going over to the telephone (the only thing left from the Bryces' ownership), and turning the receiver around, suggesting that Martin's obsessiveness will live on.

== Creation ==
The series originated in John Esmonde and Bob Larbey's 1980 stage play Hiccups, which featured versions of the characters as they would later appear in the television series. Martin was played by Sam Kelly.

The series title supposedly originated in a meeting to brainstorm possible titles, when after other titles had been rejected somebody commented that "we're going round in ever decreasing circles".

== Critical response ==
The show was voted number 52 in the BBC's Britain's Best Sitcom poll in 2003. At its peak, it attracted television audiences of around 12 million.

Reappraising the series, Andy Dawson in the Daily Mirror notes that "Ever Decreasing Circles strayed far from the well-worn path that other Britcoms trudged along in the 1970s and 1980s. There was a very real darkness at the heart of it, with Martin existing in what was almost certainly a state of permanent mental anguish."

Ricky Gervais has cited the series as one of his key influences, and following Briers' death said he would waive the repeat fees on The Office if Ever Decreasing Circles was repeated on BBC One. His TV series After Life features both Penelope Wilton and Peter Egan as different characters called Anne and Paul.

== Filming locations ==
Although the show is set in Surrey, the external location scenes were filmed in Billingshurst, West Sussex.

== Cast ==
Character	Actor
Martin Bryce	Richard Briers
Ann Bryce	Penelope Wilton
Paul Ryman	Peter Egan
Howard Hughes	Stanley Lebor
Hilda Hughes	Geraldine Newman
Mrs Beardsmore	Gabrielle Daye
Laurence	Timothy Bateson
Mrs Ripper	Ann Davies
Tommy Cooper	Ronnie Stevens
Rex Tynan	Peter Blake

== Episodes ==
Series	Episodes	Originally released	
Series	Episodes	First released	Last released
1	5	29 January 1984	26 February 1984
2	8	21 October 1984	23 December 1984
3	6	31 August 1986	5 October 1986
4	7	25 October 1987	6 December 1987
Christmas Special		24 December 1989	

=== Series 1 (1984) ===
No. overall	No. in series	Title	Original release date
1	1	"The New Neighbour"	29 January 1984
2	2	"Taking Over"	5 February 1984
3	3	"A Strange Woman"	12 February 1984
4	4	"Holiday Plans"	19 February 1984
5	5	"Vicars and Tarts"	26 February 1984

=== Series 2 (1984) ===
No. overall	No. in series	Title	Original release date
6	1	"The Tea Party"	21 October 1984
7	2	"The Cricket Match"	28 October 1984
8	3	"A Married Man"	4 November 1984
9	4	"Housework"	11 November 1984
10	5	"Snooker"	18 November 1984
11	6	"Boredom"	2 December 1984
12	7	"The Psychiatrist"	9 December 1984
13	8	"The Party"	23 December 1984

=== Series 3 (1986) ===
No. overall	No. in series	Title	Original release date
14	1	"Manure"	31 August 1986
15	2	"One Night Stand"	7 September 1986
16	3	"House to Let"	14 September 1986
17	4	"Local Hero"	21 September 1986
18	5	"The Campaign"	28 September 1986
19	6	"Cavaliers and Roundheads"	5 October 1986

=== Series 4 (1987) ===
No. overall	No. in series	Title	Original release date
20	1	"Relaxation"	25 October 1987
21	2	"Goodbye, Paul?"	1 November 1987
22	3	"Stuck in a Loft"	8 November 1987
23	4	"Neighbourhood Watch"	15 November 1987
24	5	"The Footpath"	22 November 1987
25	6	"Jumping to Conclusions"	29 November 1987
26	7	"Half an Office"	6 December 1987

=== Christmas Special (1989) ===
Just over two years after the end of the fourth series, in 1989, the programme returned with a one-off 80-minute Christmas special. The show, titled "Moving On" was broadcast on Christmas Eve.

== DVD release ==
The complete series of Ever Decreasing Circles was released on DVD in 2007.

== See also ==
British sitcom
