= The Squirrels (TV series) =

- Created by: Eric Chappell
- Starring: Bernard Hepton; Patsy Rowlands; Ken Jones; Alan David
- Country of origin: United Kingdom
- Original language: English
- No. of series: 3
- No. of episodes: 28

Production
- Running time: 30 minutes
- Production company: ATV

Original release
- Network: ITV
- Release: 8 July 1974 – 10 February 1977

The Squirrels is a British television sitcom created by Eric Chappell. It was produced by ATV for ITV and broadcast from 8 July 1974 to 10 February 1977 running for 3 series and 28 episodes. Chappell later created the Yorkshire Television sitcom Rising Damp, among other series.

== Plot and background ==
The theme was office politics in the accounts department of a fictitious TV rental company. Little work was seen to be done as the staff were usually skiving or engaging in office romances. Bernard Hepton played Mr Fletcher, the authoritarian boss who also saw himself as a 'ladies man' and Ken Jones played Rex, an unassertive subordinate.

Phil Redmond, the creator of the soap opera Brookside, was also a writer for the series. The scripts written by Eric Chappell formed the basis of a remake, Fiddlers Three, broadcast in 1991.

== Cast ==
- Bernard Hepton as Mr Fletcher
- Ken Jones as Rex
- Patsy Rowlands as Susan
- Alan David as Harry
- Ellis Jones as Burke
- Karin MacCarthy as Carol

== Episodes ==
=== Pilot (1974) ===
No.	Title	Written by	Original release date
Pilot	"The Squirrels"	Eric Chappell	8 July 1974

=== Series 1 (1975) ===
No.	Title	Written by	Original release date
1	"We Don't Want To Lose You"	Eric Chappell	18 July 1975
2	"Men Without Women"	Eric Chappell	25 July 1975
3	"Man Most Likely To"	Eric Chappell	1 August 1975
4	"The Yes Man"	Eric Chappell	8 August 1975
5	"The Fiddle"	Eric Chappell	15 August 1975
6	"The Favourite"	Eric Chappell	22 August 1975
7	"The Whizz Kid"	Eric Chappell	29 August 1975

=== Series 2 (1976) ===
No.	Title	Written by	Original release date
8	"Ashes To Ashes"	Eric Chappell	9 July 1976
9	"Fluffy-Bun"	Eric Chappell	16 July 1976
10	"Burke In Clover"	Richard Harris	23 July 1976
11	"The New Broom"	Eric Chappell	30 July 1976
12	"On the Carpet"	Kenneth Cope	6 August 1976
13	"The Renaissance"	Alan Hackney	13 August 1976
14	"The X Factor"	Richard Harris	20 August 1976
15	"The Weaker Sex"	Eric Chappell	27 August 1976

=== Series 3 (1976–77) ===
No.	Title	Written by	Original release date
16	"The Snatch"	Eric Chappell	25 November 1976
17	"Leap Frog"	Kenneth Cope	2 December 1976
18	"The Cruise"	Brian Finch	9 December 1976
19	"The Bonus Scheme"	Phil Redmond	16 December 1976
20	"The Long Hot Summer"	Eric Chappell	23 December 1976
21	"The Argument"	Alan Hackney	30 December 1976
22	"What a Way To Go"	Kenneth Cope	6 January 1977
23	"Shoulder To Shoulder"	Eric Chappell	13 January 1977
24	"The Game's the Thing"	Brian Finch	20 January 1977
25	"The Cover Up"	Alan Hackney	27 January 1977
26	"The Break-In"	Phil Redmond	3 February 1977
27	"Men of Straw"	Brian Finch	10 February 1977

== Archive status and home release ==
Surviving episodes of The Squirrels were released by Network DVD in the UK (Region 2) on 29 April 2013. This DVD consisted of the existing 22 episodes (out of 28). Scripts for some of the missing episodes are included in .pdf format on disc one. The missing episodes are the pilot, 1/1, 1/5, 1/6, and 1/7. The rest of the first series survives only in inferior recordings to the original video format, either re-converted from NTSC copies (1/2, 1/3) or as a domestic videotape (1/4).
