= Eric Chappell =

English scriptwriter (1933–2022)

- Born: Eric George Chappell; 25 September 1933; Grantham, Lincolnshire, England
- Died: 21 April 2022 (aged 88); Grantham, Lincolnshire, England
- Occupation: Scriptwriter
- Writing career
- Period: 1973–2008
- Genre: Television
- Notable works: The Squirrels (1974–1977); Rising Damp (1974–1978); Only When I Laugh (1979–1982); Misfits (1981); The Bounder (1982–1983); Duty Free (1984–1986); Home to Roost (1985–1990); Singles (1984–1991); Natural Causes (1988); Haggard (1990–1992); Fiddlers Three (1991)

Eric George Chappell (25 September 1933 – 21 April 2022) was an English television comedy writer and playwright who wrote or co-wrote some of the UK's biggest sitcom hits over a more than quarter-century career, first gaining significant notice in the 1970s.

== Early life ==
Chappell was born in Grantham, Lincolnshire, and educated at Grantham Boys’ Central School. He worked as an auditor for the East Midlands Electricity Board for 22 years beginning in 1951, only becoming a full-time writer in 1973. He had written several novels which were rejected by publishers, before deciding to become a playwright.

== Career ==
Chappell wrote the play The Banana Box, which was given a staged reading at the Hampstead Theatre Club in 1970. A production at the Phoenix Theatre in Leicester in 1971, with Wilfrid Brambell in the role of the landlord, and was later produced in the West End in 1973, with Leonard Rossiter now in the role. This play later became the basis for sitcom Rising Damp, which aired on ITV from 1974 to 1978 and won the 1978 BAFTA for Best Situation Comedy. The Banana Box had a brief run at the Hudson Guild Theater in New York in 1979. A film version of Rising Damp was released in 1980 and won several Evening Standard British Film Awards, although he admitted the screenplay was based on television scripts.

Chappell wrote the film reluctantly, having originally declined the commission. He later admitted that recycling television material for the cinema was a mistake, and that the film suffered from the absence of Richard Beckinsale, who had died in March 1979 before filming began. His character was written out of the script, leaving a visible gap in the ensemble dynamic that critics noted at the time. The Guardian's obituary described Chappell's body of work as representing "a last flowering of the traditional British sitcom" before the form shifted toward more socially confrontational styles in the 1980s.

Chappell's earliest sitcom was The Squirrels (1974–77), an office comedy which ran for three series. Chappell wrote only half of the scripts for the series, these were later remade as Fiddlers Three (1991). His other series included Only When I Laugh, The Bounder, Duty Free, Singles, Haggard, and Home to Roost.

Chappell married Muriel Elizabeth Taylor in 1959; the couple had two children.

== Work ==
=== Television ===
- The Squirrels
- Rising Damp
- Only When I Laugh
- Misfits
- The Bounder
- Duty Free (with Jean Warr)
- Home to Roost
- Singles (with Jean Warr)
- Natural Causes
- Haggard
- Fiddlers Three

=== Plays ===
- The Banana Box (basis for Rising Damp)
- Dead Reckoning
- Double Vision
- False Pretences
- Father's Day (spin-off of Home to Roost, 2011)
- Fiddlers Three
- Ground Rules
- Haggard (with Michael Green)
- Haunted
- Haywire
- Heatstroke (a.k.a. Snakes and Ladders)
- It Can Damage Your Health (basis of Only When I Laugh)
- Last of the Duty Free
- Mixed Feelings
- Natural Causes
- Passing Strangers
- Side Effects
- Sitting Tenants
- Something's Burning
- Summer End
- The Night in Question
- Theft
- Up and Coming
- We're Strangers Here
- Wife after Death

=== Film ===
- Rising Damp
