= Home to Roost =

British TV sitcom (1985–1990)

- Genre: Sitcom
- Created by: Eric Chappell
- Starring: John Thaw; Reece Dinsdale
- Country of origin: United Kingdom
- Original language: English
- No. of series: 4
- No. of episodes: 29

Production
- Executive producer: Vernon Lawrence
- Running time: 30 minutes
- Production company: Yorkshire Television

Original release
- Network: ITV
- Release: 19 April 1985 – 19 January 1990

Home to Roost is a British sitcom produced by Yorkshire Television and aired between 19 April 1985 and 19 January 1990. Written by Eric Chappell, it stars John Thaw as Henry Willows and Reece Dinsdale as his teenaged son Matthew.

The premise is that Henry Willows, a 40-something who has been divorced from his wife for seven years and is perfectly happy living alone in London until his oldest child, Matthew, arrives to live with him after being thrown out by his mother. The episodes generally revolve around Henry's annoyance at having his solitude disturbed and the age gap between father and son. Henry employs two cleaners during the show's life; first Enid Thompson and in the third series, Fiona Fennell.

The show's theme tune is Lionel Bart's "Consider Yourself" from Oliver!, arranged in a jazz style by Peter Knight.

The series was later repeated on Channel 4, ITV3, Forces TV and That's TV. All 29 episodes have now been released on DVD by the Network imprint.

== Main cast ==
- John Thaw as Henry Willows - Henry is a divorced middle-aged man who lives by himself, but when his son, Matthew, turns up on his door step, expecting to be waited on hand and foot, his life is turned upside down.
- Reece Dinsdale as Matthew Willows - Matthew is a teenager who gets himself into trouble, and is obsessed with girls and money.
- Elizabeth Bennett as Enid Thompson - Enid is Henry's first cleaner. She is nosey and appears to be attracted to Henry.
- Joan Blackham as Fiona Fennell - Fiona is Henry's second cleaner.
- Rebecca Lacey as Julie Willows - Julie is Henry's daughter and Matthew's sister. Despite living with her mother after her parents' divorce she appears to be a daddy's girl.
- Sheila Hancock - Sue Willows - Henry's ex-wife. She only appears in one episode. Hancock is the real-life wife (widow as of 2002) of Thaw.

== Episodes ==
=== Series overview ===
series
Series	Episodes	Originally released	
Series	Episodes	First released	Last released
1	7	19 April 1985	31 May 1985
2	7	5 September 1986	17 October 1986
3	7	24 October 1987	5 December 1987
3	Special	27 December 1987	
4	7	1 December 1989	19 January 1990

=== Series 1 (1985) ===
No. overall	No. in series	Title	Directed by	Written by	Original release date
1	1	"A New Life"	David Reynolds	Eric Chappell	19 April 1985
Henry's bachelor lifestyle is turned upside down when his son Matthew asks to stay.
2	2	"Bad Apples"	David Reynolds	Eric Chappell	26 April 1985
Henry must find a new school for Matthew.
3	3	"All You Need is Love"	David Reynolds	Eric Chappell	3 May 1985
Henry objects to Matthew's choice of girlfriend.
4	4	"Suspect"	David Reynolds	Eric Chappell	10 May 1985
Matthew suspects that the neighbour's college student son is not all he seems.
5	5	"Dating Henry?"	David Reynolds	Eric Chappell	17 May 1985
Henry is acting very strange and Matthew sets out to find out why.
6	6	"Small Change"	David Reynolds	Eric Chappell	24 May 1985
Henry refuses to invest in Matthew's future until he finds suitable employment.
7	7	"The Way We Were"	David Reynolds	Eric Chappell	31 May 1985
Matthew sets up a meeting between his divorced parents.

=== Series 2 (1986) ===
No. overall	No. in series	Title	Directed by	Written by	Original release date
8	1	"Protest"	David Reynolds	Eric Chappell	5 September 1986
Henry and Matthew's relationship is strained when Matthew becomes an animal rights activist and a vegetarian.
9	2	"Open House"	David Reynolds	Eric Chappell	12 September 1986
Matthew throws a party whilst Henry is away.
10	3	"Plastic Dreamworld"	David Reynolds	Eric Chappell	19 September 1986
Matthew inherits a large sum of money but struggles to keep it.
11	4	"Acting Out"	David Reynolds	Eric Chappell	26 September 1986
Matthew becomes an actor much to the anger of Henry.
12	5	"The Test"	David Reynolds	Eric Chappell	3 October 1986
Henry reluctantly teaches Matthew how to drive.
13	6	"Any Questions?"	David Reynolds	Eric Chappell	10 October 1986
Henry is standing for councillor as an Independent, but can he convince first time voter Matthew and staunch conservative Enid to vote for him?
14	7	"Julie"	David Reynolds	Eric Chappell	17 October 1986
Henry's daughter (and Matthew's sister) Julie comes to stay, but Henry and Matthew discover that three is a crowd.

=== Series 3 (1987) ===
No. overall	No. in series	Title	Directed by	Written by	Original release date
15	1	"Human Interest"	David Reynolds	Eric Chappell	24 October 1987
Henry and Matthew search for a new cleaning lady.
16	2	"Success Story"	David Reynolds	Eric Chappell	31 October 1987
Henry's brother comes to stay and Henry finds himself no longer wanted.
17	3	"High Spirits"	David Reynolds	Eric Chappell	7 November 1987
Matthew becomes obsessed with ghosts.
18	4	"The Real Thing"	David Reynolds	Eric Chappell	14 November 1987
Henry tries to play matchmaker for Matthew.
19	5	"Crimewatch"	David Reynolds	Eric Chappell	21 November 1987
Henry becomes paranoid about security and joins the neighbourhood watch.
20	6	"Getting On?!"	David Reynolds	Eric Chappell	28 November 1987
A visit to the hospital urges Matthew to adopt a homeless old man.
21	7	"Paper Chase"	David Reynolds	Eric Chappell	5 December 1987
Matthew sits his exams, but can he resist his friend's offer of cheating.
Christmas special
22	S	"Family Ties"	David Reynolds	Eric Chappell	27 December 1987
Henry's hopes of a quiet Christmas are dashed when his kids turn up.

=== Series 4 (1989-1990) ===
No. overall	No. in series	Title	Directed by	Written by	Original release date
23	1	"Bridge of Sighs"	David Reynolds	Eric Chappell	1 December 1989
A blast from the past sets Henry thinking of romance.
24	2	"Front Runner"	David Reynolds	Eric Chappell	8 December 1989
Henry suggests Matthew gets a job in order to pay for his college fees.
25	3	"The Boyfriend"	Graham Wetherell	Eric Chappell	15 December 1989
Henry quickly takes a dislike to Julie's new boyfriend.
26	4	"Thought for the Day"	David Reynolds	Eric Chappell	22 December 1989
Henry takes in a lodger which turns into a disaster for Matthew.
27	5	"Return to Clagthorpe"	David Reynolds	Eric Chappell	5 January 1990
Henry and Matthew go to Clagthorpe for a holiday.
28	6	"High Noon"	Graham Wetherell	Eric Chappell	12 January 1990
Matthew's involvement with a boxer's girlfriend leads to a fight.
29	7	"Leaving"	David Reynolds	Eric Chappell	19 January 1990
Matthew is leaving for college. Will Henry's life ever be the same again?

== Foreign versions ==
- The US version, You Again? was less successful and lasted two seasons, totalling 26 episodes. Elizabeth Bennett reprised the role of Enid in the show.
- The Dutch version, Ha, die Pa! (Hello, Dad!) ran from 1990 to 1993 and was broadcast by NCRV. Luc Lutz (1924-2001) and his son Joris starred as Norbert and Matthijs Hoogendijk. Keeping it in the family, Pieter Lutz (1927-2009) guested as the homeless old man in the adaptation of the 'Getting on?!' episode. Matthijs' sister Freddie was played by Bettina Berger.
