= Money to Burn (musical) =

Money to Burn was a short-lived musical written by Daniel Abineri and performed at The Venue, off Leicester Square, London. The musical closed shortly after its press night following poor reviews.
