= Only When I Laugh (TV series) =

British TV sitcom (1979–1982)

- Genre: Sitcom
- Written by: Eric Chappell
- Directed by: Vernon Lawrence; Graeme Muir
- Starring: James Bolam; Peter Bowles; Christopher Strauli; Richard Wilson; Derrick Branche
- Theme music composer: Ken Jones
- Country of origin: United Kingdom
- Original language: English
- No. of series: 4
- No. of episodes: 29

Production
- Producer: Vernon Lawrence
- Editors: Phil Cooke; Keith Coppock; Jim Molyneux; Trevor Pugh; Stuart Quarmby; Lance Tattersall
- Running time: 30 minutes
- Production company: Yorkshire Television

Original release
- Network: ITV
- Release: 29 October 1979 – 16 December 1982

Only When I Laugh is a British television sitcom made by Yorkshire Television for ITV. It aired between 29 October 1979 and 16 December 1982 and is set in the ward of an NHS hospital. The title is a response to the question, "Does it hurt?".

It stars James Bolam, Peter Bowles, and Christopher Strauli as patients Roy Figgis, Archie Glover, and Norman Binns. Mr. Gordon Thorpe, their consultant surgeon, is played by Richard Wilson; and Gupte, the staff nurse from Delhi, is played by Derrick Branche.

The show was one of many successes for writer Eric Chappell, and has been repeated on ITV4 since 2019, having previously been repeated on ITV3 and was previously repeated on The Family Channel, UK Gold and on Plus and now Rewind TV

== Production ==
Only When I Laugh was written after Eric Chappell was commissioned by Yorkshire Television to write another sitcom following the success of Rising Damp. Chappell devised the premise of a hospital comedy from the patients' perspective as he felt that previous television based in a hospital setting focused on the doctors, nurses and staff. In an interview with the Liverpool Echo in 1979, Chappell said of the three main characters, "They all come from different backgrounds. They differ in class and politics and they're all different in their attitude to being in hospital. That's what gives the vital chemistry for the comedy."

Only When I Laugh marked James Bolam's return to situation comedy following his success with Whatever Happened to the Likely Lads?. The actor told the Evening Express in 1979, "I'm thoroughly enjoying making the series. We have had a lot of fun. Eric Chappell is a smashing writer with a very distinctive style and brilliantly clever lines. Hospital comedies have been done before but this is different in that it is seen from the patients' point of view."

== Reception ==
In a discussion of Eric Chappell's work in The Guinness Book of Classic British TV, Only When I Laugh was described as "intermittently rewarding".

== Cast ==
- James Bolam as Roy Figgis
- Peter Bowles as Archie Glover
- Christopher Strauli as Norman Binns
- Richard Wilson as Gordon Thorpe
- Derrick Branche as Gupte

Guest appearances were made by Gwen Taylor, John Quayle, Neil McCarthy, Patrick Troughton, Moira Lister, Pat Ashton, Neil Connery, Pamela Cundell, Brenda Cowling, Reginald Marsh, Rosalind Ayres, Ann Beach, Mary Tamm, Karl Howman, Isla Blair, Ronnie Stevens, Stephen Greif, Robert Gillespie, Sylvia Kay and Frank Middlemass.

== Episodes ==
=== Series overview ===
Series	Episodes	Originally released	
Series	Episodes	First released	Last released
1	7	29 October 1979	10 December 1979
2	7	29 April 1980	10 June 1980
3	7	2 September 1981	14 October 1981
Special		24 December 1981	
4	7	4 November 1982	16 December 1982

=== Series 1 (1979) ===
No. overall	No. in series	Title	Directed by	Written by	Original release date
1	1	"A Bed with a View"	Vernon Lawrence	Eric Chappell	29 October 1979
Norman arrives at the ward and is given the bed next to the window. A game of musical beds ensues as Figgis and Archie want it too.
2	2	"Operation Norman"	Vernon Lawrence	Eric Chappell	5 November 1979
Norman's due for his appendix operation and is rather upset about it. He turns to Figgis for comfort in his hour of need.
3	3	"The Rumour"	Vernon Lawrence	Eric Chappell	12 November 1979
Figgis overhears Doctor Thorpe telling Gupte that his dog may not live much longer. Unfortunately, Figgis didn't hear the 'dog' bit and thinks it's about him.
4	4	"The Man with the Face"	Vernon Lawrence	Eric Chappell	19 November 1979
Archie's lothario-like tendencies are coming back to haunt him when he's convinced he's being stalked by a Greek madman for besmirching his fiancée.
5	5	"Let Them Eat Cake"	Vernon Lawrence	Eric Chappell	26 November 1979
The trio can stand the daily menu no longer and go on hunger strike. What they hadn't bargained for, however, was how hungry they would get.
6	6	"Tangled Web"	Vernon Lawrence	Eric Chappell	3 December 1979
Archie is craving female company and is heartened to see an attractive new nurse. So is Norman.
7	7	"Is There a Doctor in the House?"	Vernon Lawrence	Eric Chappell	10 December 1979
Tired of sitting in bed all day, Figgis disguises himself as a doctor and goes for a walk. Unfortunately, he's mistaken for a real doctor.

=== Series 2 (1980) ===
No. overall	No. in series	Title	Directed by	Written by	Original release date
8	1	"Whatever Happened to Gloria Robins?"	Graeme Muir	Eric Chappell	29 April 1980
The trio get into a lather when a glamorous film star arrives on the ward.
9	2	"Where There's a Will"	Graeme Muir	Eric Chappell	6 May 1980
A rich patient becomes popular when the other patients learn he's about to make his will.
10	3	"It Can Damage Your Health"	Graeme Muir	Eric Chappell	13 May 1980
Despite being warned on a frequent basis, the patients are undeterred by the risks of smoking.
11	4	"The Cosmic Influence"	Vernon Lawrence	Eric Chappell	20 May 1980
Figgis becomes interested in astrology and star signs which doesn't go down well with others.
12	5	"The Visitors"	Vernon Lawrence	Eric Chappell	27 May 1980
It's visiting day and Norman's mother has another dreary girl lined up for him, much to the others' amusement.
13	6	"The Lost Sheep"	Vernon Lawrence	Eric Chappell	3 June 1980
Figgis admits he's not been christened but sees the light when he meets a vicar.
14	7	"Last Tango"	Vernon Lawrence	Eric Chappell	10 June 1980
The "regulars" plan a party, but unexpected guests turn up.

=== Series 3 (1981) ===
No. overall	No. in series	Title	Directed by	Written by	Original release date
15	1	"A Day in the Life Of"	Vernon Lawrence	Eric Chappell	2 September 1981
A film crew are at the hospital making a documentary about Gordon Thorpe, but the patients and Gupte are determined to have themselves appear on TV.
16	2	"Adam's Rib"	Vernon Lawrence	Eric Chappell	9 September 1981
When a new, young female doctor arrives on the ward, the trio and Thorpe differ in their opinions of her.
17	3	"The Right Honourable Gentleman"	Vernon Lawrence	Eric Chappell	16 September 1981
A Member of Parliament arrives on the ward for treatment, but is refusing to sign a petition to stop the hospital from being closed.
18	4	"Postman's Knock"	Vernon Lawrence	Eric Chappell	23 September 1981
"Agony Aunt" Clare Butterfield receives a letter from "Worried of Ward 3", but her reply leads to complications.
19	5	"Accident"	Vernon Lawrence	Eric Chappell	30 September 1981
When Norman witnesses an accident involving Dr. Thorpe, he is not sure whether he should testify as to what he saw.
20	6	"Dear Diary"	Vernon Lawrence	Eric Chappell	7 October 1981
Figgis, Glover and Thorpe are determined to find out what Norman has written about them in his diary.
21	7	"These You Have Loved"	Vernon Lawrence	Eric Chappell	14 October 1981
The trio are fed up with hospital radio and attempt to do a better job at presenting it themselves.

=== Christmas Special (1981) ===
No. overall	No. in series	Title	Directed by	Written by	Original release date
22	Special	"Away for Christmas"	Vernon Lawrence	Eric Chappell	24 December 1981
It's Christmas at the hospital and although not everyone is enjoying the festive spirits, the trio take a keen interest in a new patient on the ward.

=== Series 4 (1982) ===
No. overall	No. in series	Title	Directed by	Written by	Original release date
23	1	"Blood Brothers"	Vernon Lawrence	Eric Chappell	4 November 1982
Illness strikes Archie Glover, and Dr Thorpe insists he have a blood transfusion, but knowing who the donor is makes the invalid feel even more poorly.
24	2	"Conduct Unbecoming"	Vernon Lawrence	Eric Chappell	11 November 1982
A female patient falls for Dr Thorpe's bedside manner, and caught in a compromising position, he turns to the men's ward occupants for help, but will they come to the aid of a friend in need?
25	3	"All in the Mind"	Vernon Lawrence	Eric Chappell	18 November 1982
Figgis dabbles in amateur psychiatry and deduces that Norman is suffering from sexual repression.
26	4	"In Sickness & in Health"	Vernon Lawrence	Eric Chappell	25 November 1982
Norman's fiancee visits to discuss the wedding arrangements – but her suggestions force him to take matters into his own hands.
27	5	"Escape"	Vernon Lawrence	Eric Chappell	2 December 1982
The regulars are terrified by the admission of a convict onto their ward.
28	6	"When Did You Last See Your Father?"	Vernon Lawrence	Eric Chappell	9 December 1982
An inebriated man collapses in reception, and Figgis is employed to find out more about the mysterious visitor.
29	7	"The Reunion"	Vernon Lawrence	Eric Chappell	16 December 1982
The boys are discharged from hospital, and promptly arrange a reunion under more enjoyable circumstances.

== Home media ==
- In region 2, all four series of Only When I Laugh have been released on DVD by Network DVD, and a complete series box set has also been released both with a george harrison music edit in episode 21
- In region 1, series 1 & 2 have been released in individual DVDs. A complete 5-disc box set was released on 10 March 2009 by Dep Distribution under license from ITV Studios and distributed by Vivendi Entertainment.
- In region 4, firstly the Complete Box Set was released in 2008, followed by the individual seasons in 2010. The 1981 Christmas Special is not featured on any Region 4 DVD.
1. Only When I Laugh (Season 1–4) – April 12, 2008
2. Only When I Laugh: Season 1 – June 9, 2010
3. Only When I Laugh: Season 2 – June 9, 2010
4. Only When I Laugh: Season 3 – September 8, 2010
5. Only When I Laugh: Season 4 – September 8, 2010
