= The Uncanny (film) =

- Theatrical poster to The Uncanny (1977)
- Directed by: Denis Héroux
- Written by: Michel Parry
- Produced by: René Dupont; Claude Héroux; Milton Subotsky
- Starring: Peter Cushing; Ray Milland; Samantha Eggar; Joan Greenwood; Donald Pleasence; Donald Pilon; John Vernon
- Cinematography: Harry Waxman
- Edited by: Keith Palmer; Michel Guay; Peter Weatherley
- Music by: Wilfred Josephs
- Production companies: Cinévidéo; The Rank Organisation
- Distributed by: Rank Film Distributors (UK); Astral Films (Canada)
- Release dates: 26 August 1977 (Canada); 4 April 1978 (UK)
- Running time: 88 minutes
- Countries: United Kingdom; Canada
- Language: English
- Budget: CAD$1.1 million

The Uncanny is a 1977 British-Canadian anthology horror film directed by Denis Héroux, written by Michel Parry, and starring Peter Cushing, Donald Pleasence, Ray Milland, Joan Greenwood, Donald Pilon, Samantha Eggar, and John Vernon.

Although it is similar to the horror anthologies released by Amicus Productions and could be mistaken as one, it was actually distributed by The Rank Organisation. However, the co-producer was Milton Subotsky of Amicus.

== Plot ==
=== Montreal 1977 ===
In 1977, in Montreal, writer Wilbur Gray visits his publisher Frank Richards to discuss his new book about cats. Wilbur believes that felines are supernatural creatures, and that they are the devil in disguise. Convinced that they are the actual masters over humans that keep humans in line, citing since writing his manuscript, he's found himself being observed and even stalked by various felines. Wilbur tells three tales he's uncovered in recent history to illustrate his thoughts:

=== London 1912 ===
In 1912, in London, Miss Malkin is a wealthy woman who rewrites her will leaving her fortune to her cats rather than to her nephew Michael. Her maid Janet, also the mistress of Michael, steals one copy of the will from the lawyer's briefcase and tries to destroy the original copy which is kept in the safe. When Miss Malkin sees her attempt, Janet kills her. The cats avenge Miss Malkin's death, first on Janet and then when he arrives looking for her on Michael. When the police arrive with Malkin's lawyer, the cats are discovered having been forced to feed on the bodies.

=== Quebec 1975 ===
In 1975, in the Province of Quebec, the orphan Lucy comes to live with her haughty aunt Mrs. Blake, her husband, and her lanky cousin Angela after the death of her parents in a plane crash. Lucy brings her only friend, the cat Wellington, but Angela forces her parents to get rid of Wellington after jealously framing him for several acts of vandalism. Lucy uses her mother's book of witchcraft to avenge Wellington by making Angela the size of a mouse.

=== Hollywood 1936 ===
In 1936, in Hollywood, the actor Valentine De'ath replaces the blade of a fake pendulum with a real one to kill his actress wife, and give his young mistress and aspiring actress Edina a chance. The cat of his wife avenges her death on first Edina with a makeshift iron maiden and then on Valentine after they dispose of its newborn kittens. When the film crew return in the morning they discover that for Valentine the cat literarily "Got His Tongue".

The wraparound narrative tale concludes with the cats brainwashing Frank to do their bidding, leading to the burning of Wilbur's research and the demise of Wilbur himself.

== Cast ==
=== Montreal 1977 ===
- Peter Cushing as Wilbur Gray
- Ray Milland as Frank Richards

=== London 1912 ===
- Susan Penhaligon as Janet
- Joan Greenwood as Miss Malkin
- Roland Culver as Wallace
- Simon Williams as Michael

=== Quebec 1975 ===
- Donald Pilon as Mr. Blake
- Alexandra Stewart as Mrs. Joan Blake
- Chloe Franks as Angela Blake
- Katrina Holden Bronson as Lucy
- Renée Girard as Mrs. Maitland

=== Hollywood 1936 ===
- Samantha Eggar as Edina Hamilton
- Donald Pleasence as Valentine De'ath
- John Vernon as Pomeroy
- Catherine Bégin as Madeleine
- Jean LeClerc as Barrington
- Sean McCann as The Inspector

== Production ==
The Uncanny is the sixth Milton Subotsky film in which a character has the name Maitland (Mrs Maitland, played by Renee Girard). The others are And Now the Screaming Starts! (1973), in which Guy Rolfe plays Maitland; Tales from the Crypt (1972), in which Ian Hendry plays Carl Maitland; They Came from Beyond Space, in which Robin Parkinson plays Dr Maitland; The Skull (1965), which top-bills Peter Cushing as Dr Christopher Maitland, and the earliest, The City of the Dead (aka Horror Hotel, 1960), in which Tom Naylor plays Bill Maitland.

=== Filming ===
The film was a British-Canadian co-production shot on-location in Montreal and Senneville, Quebec, and Pinewood Studios in England.

Filming started in Montreal on 16 November 1976.

== Release ==
=== Certification ===
In the UK, the film was originally given an X-rating.

== Reception ==
=== Box Office ===
The film performed poorly at the box office.

=== Critical ===
Filmkink argued the movie "has its moments and its fans, though it isn’t up to Amicus at their peak."
