= The Monster Club =

1981 film by Roy Ward Baker

- Spanish theatrical release poster
- Directed by: Roy Ward Baker
- Written by: Edward Abraham; Valerie Abraham
- Produced by: Milton Subotsky
- Starring: Vincent Price; Donald Pleasence; John Carradine; Stuart Whitman
- Cinematography: Peter Jessop
- Edited by: Peter Tanner
- Music by: Douglas Gamley
- Production companies: Chips Productions; Sword and Sorcery Productions
- Distributed by: ITC
- Release date: 12 April 1981
- Running time: 97 minutes
- Country: United Kingdom
- Language: English

The Monster Club is a 1981 British anthology horror film directed by Roy Ward Baker and starring Vincent Price and John Carradine. It is based on the works of the British horror author R. Chetwynd-Hayes. It was the final film from Milton Subotsky, who was best known for his work with Amicus Productions; Amicus were well known for their anthologies, but this was not an Amicus film. It was also the final feature film directed by Baker.

== Plot ==
=== Prologue ===
A fictionalised version of author R. Chetwynd-Hayes is approached on a city street by a strange man who turns out to be a starving vampire named Eramus. Eramus bites the writer, and in gratitude for the small "donation", takes his (basically unharmed but bewildered) victim to the titular club, which is a covert gathering place for a multitude of supernatural creatures. In between the club's unique music and dance performances, Eramus introduces three stories about his fellow creatures of the night.

=== The Shadmock ===
A young, financially struggling woman takes a job at a secluded manor house owned by Raven, a hybrid creature called a Shadmock, who leads a troubled and tragic existence and is notorious for its demonic whistle. As time goes by, the girl, Angela, develops a friendship with the mysterious Shadmock, and he eventually proposes to her. Alarmed, Angela refuses, but her controlling boyfriend forces her to go through with it to gain the Shadmock's vast wealth. On the night of the engagement party, Angela is caught robbing the Shadmock's safe and screams that she could never love him. Heartbroken, the Shadmock whistles and destroys Angela's face. Her boyfriend is driven insane and locked away in an asylum upon seeing her.

=== The Vampires ===
The timid son of a peaceable family of vampires lives a miserable, lonely life where he is bullied at school and his father spends little time with him. The son discovers his father is a vampire, being relentlessly hunted by a team of bureaucratic undead-killers, The Blini or B-Squad, led by Pickering. The hunters break into the house and stake the vampire father, but the tables are turned when the father bites Pickering, meaning that he will now have to be staked by his own assistants. A chase ensues, and Pickering is staked. After his men take his body away, the timid son and his mother return to the basement to find that the father faked his death using a stake-proof vest filled with tomato ketchup.

=== The Ghouls ===
A movie director scouting locations for his next film pays a horrifying visit to an isolated, decrepit village, Loughville, where the sinister residents refuse to let him leave. He discovers to his horror that the village is inhabited by species of corpse-eating demons called ghouls who unearth graves for food and clothes. And now there are no more graves to plunder, and the ghouls are hungry for flesh. While imprisoned by the ghouls, he meets Luna, the daughter of a ghoul father and a deceased human mother, making her a Humegoo. Luna advises him to hide in the church, as ghouls cannot cross holy ground. Whilst in the church, the director discovers the terrifying truth of Loughville; centuries before, a swarm of ghouls invaded the village, mated with the humans, and made their nest there. With the aid of Luna, the director attempts to escape and almost succeeds – only for Luna to be killed by the ghouls and the director captured again and returned to the village by ghoul policemen.

=== Epilogue ===
At the end of the film, Eramus cheerfully lists to the other club members all the imaginative ways that humans have of being horrible to each other and declares that humans are the most despicable monsters of all. Thus Chetwynd-Hayes is made an honorary monster and member of the club.

== Cast ==
- Vincent Price as Eramus
- John Carradine as R. Chetwynd-Hayes
- Donald Pleasence as Pickering
- Stuart Whitman as Sam
- Richard Johnson as Mr. Busotsky
- Barbara Kellerman as Angela
- Britt Ekland as Mrs. Busotsky
- Simon Ward as George
- Patrick Magee as Innkeeper
- Anthony Valentine as Mooney
- Anthony Steel as Lintom Busotsky
- James Laurenson as Raven (The Shadmock)
- Geoffrey Bayldon as Psychiatrist
- Lesley Dunlop as Luna
- Neil McCarthy as Watson
- Warren Saire as Young Lintom Busotsky

== Behind the scenes ==
Christopher Lee was originally sought for the role of Chetwynd-Hayes, but flatly turned the offer down simply upon hearing the film's title from his agent. Peter Cushing also turned down a role, though he would soon work with director Baker on the TV film The Masks of Death. It was one of the last feature films for Anthony Steel.

=== In-jokes ===
There are a number of in-jokes in the movie relating to Amicus Films:

- The character of Lintom Busotsky is a film producer, and his name is an anagram of the real film's producer, Milton Subotsky.
- Busotsky introduces a film called From Beyond the Tombstone, an allusion to From Beyond the Grave.
- The cast includes Patrick Magee, Britt Ekland and Geoffrey Bayldon, all of whom appeared in the 1972 Amicus anthology film Asylum.
- There is a reference to a producer "Dark John" – many Amicus films were made by John Dark.

Baker later recalled:

[It] had a marvellous cast, a very distinguished cast, who all worked their heads off and did it very well. That was again a magazine picture, several stories. I didn't think it was very good. The idea was to fill it full of pop songs and it had about four or five different bands in it, who appeared in between the stories. Well that was alright, but the pop world is so fragile that if you were to say today, "who are the top five most popular bands?” and you could go out and get them and take them to Elstree, stick them in a picture which would take a couple of weeks at the outside, but no picture ever gets released in less than six months after it's finished, or three months after it's finished. In this case the picture was on ice for a year before they actually showed it. Haven't the faintest idea why, they probably forgot they'd got it, but whatever happened by that time of course in the pop world all these things are totally out of date, gone, hopeless, so there was no value in that at all. A great pity. We would have been far better off without that aspect of it.

== Reception ==
The film premiered on 12 April 1981. The film was released to cinemas in the UK on 24 May 1981.

Chetwynd-Hayes was disappointed with the film, finding the humour silly, disliking the script and how his original stories were changed (he said only Ghoulsville was faithful), and hating the pop music. He also thought John Carradine was too old to play him.

The movie was a critical and commercial failure.

== Music ==
Musical artists performing between stories include BA Robertson, The Viewers and The Pretty Things. The soundtrack features UB40 though they do not appear in the film. The rock band Night perform the track "Stripper", which did not appear on either of their albums.

The film's soundtrack album including both songs and instrumental tracks is included as a bonus feature on the US release of the DVD and Blu-ray.

== In other media ==
In 1980, The Monster Club script – before the film itself was shot – was adapted into a 25-page comics story by Dez Skinn, John Bolton (21 pages), and David Lloyd (4 pages). Used as a promotional tool for the film, the comic was originally published in a one-off called The Monster Club magazine. It was later reprinted in two parts in Halls of Horror issues #25-26, published in 1983.

== See also ==
- Vampire film
