= From Beyond the Grave =

1974 British film by Kevin Connor

- Theatrical release poster
- Directed by: Kevin Connor
- Screenplay by: Raymond Christodoulou; Robin Clarke
- Based on: Short stories by R. Chetwynd-Hayes
- Produced by: Max Rosenberg; Milton Subotsky
- Starring: Peter Cushing; Donald Pleasence; Ian Bannen; Diana Dors; David Warner
- Cinematography: Alan Hume
- Edited by: John Ireland
- Music by: Douglas Gamley
- Production company: Amicus Productions
- Distributed by: Warner Bros.
- Release date: 22 February 1974 (United Kingdom)
- Running time: 98 minutes
- Country: United Kingdom; United States
- Language: English
- Budget: £203,941

From Beyond the Grave (also known as The Creatures from Beyond the Grave) is a 1974 anthology horror film directed by Kevin Connor, produced by Milton Subotsky, and starring Peter Cushing, Donald Pleasence, Ian Bannen, Diana Dors, and David Warner. It is based on short stories by R. Chetwynd-Hayes.

A co-production between the United Kingdom and United States, From Beyond the Grave was produced by Amicus Productions and distributed by Warner Bros. It was the last in a series of anthology films from Amicus and was preceded by Dr Terror's House of Horrors (1965), Torture Garden (1967), The House That Dripped Blood (1970), Tales from the Crypt (1972), Asylum (1972) and The Vault of Horror (1973).

== Plot ==
=== Prologue ===
Four customers buy or steal items from Temptations Limited, an antiques shop whose motto is "Offers You Cannot Resist". A nasty fate awaits those who cheat the shop's proprietor.

=== "The Gatecrasher" ===
Edward Charlton buys an antique mirror for a knockdown price, believing that he has tricked the proprietor into accepting that it is a reproduction. His friends remark that the mirror looks like something out of a ghost story, inspiring him to hold a seance in his flat. The ritual puts Charlton in contact with a genuine ghost residing in the mirror, who wishes to "feed" on human blood. Falling into the creature's power, Charlton becomes a recluse, luring people to the flat and murdering them. His girlfriend Pamela becomes alarmed at his withdrawal from the world and goes to check on him, just after the ghost tells him one more victim will suffice. Charlton controls himself enough to send her away unharmed, then kills a neighbour who has come to complain about his strange behaviour. The ghost leaves the mirror and takes human shape, declaring that it has achieved immortality. If Charlton will now kill himself, he will free the ghost to walk abroad, and get his own chance to go "beyond the ultimate". Persuaded, Charlton impales himself on a knife. The flat is cleared out and rented to new occupants, and years pass without incident until the latest owner also decides to hold a seance. Charlton's hungry spectre appears in the mirror.

=== "An Act of Kindness" ===
Christopher Lowe is a frustrated middle-management drone, bullied by his wife Mabel and shown no respect by his son. He befriends Jim Underwood, an old soldier scratching out a living selling matches and shoelaces. Lowe's military service was in the Pay Corps, but to Underwood he claims to be a decorated soldier. In Temptations Ltd he sees a Distinguished Service Order medal that would lend credibility to his lie, but the proprietor will not sell it without documentary proof that Lowe was given such an award. Lowe steals the medal and uses it to impress Underwood, who invites him home for tea. There Lowe meets Underwood's daughter Emily, who has supernatural powers. Emily and Lowe start an affair, and he eventually accepts her offer to kill Mabel using an effigy. Emily and Lowe subsequently marry, with Lowe's son and Jim Underwood present at the wedding and reception. The wedding cake topper, a sculpture of a bride and groom, is another enchanted effigy; Emily cuts open the head of the groom and Lowe falls onto the table, dead. Underwood and Emily explain to Lowe's son that they always answer the prayers of a child "in one way or another".

=== "The Elemental" ===
Reggie Warren, a businessman, enters Temptations Ltd and puts the price tag of a cheaper snuffbox in the one he wants to buy. The proprietor sells him the box at the lower price and says, "I hope you enjoy snuffing it." On the train home, a psychic, Madame Orloff, advises Warren that an elemental— a malevolent spirit desperate to break into the corporeal world— has settled on his shoulder. She offers to perform an exorcism if the elemental becomes troublesome. At home, Warren's wife Susan remarks on the repulsive smell that he has brought into the house, and their dog disappears. After the elemental briefly takes control of Warren's body and attacks Susan, he calls in Madame Orloff. She wages a house-shaking supernatural battle with the creature, and leaves satisfied that it has been expelled. In fact the elemental has only changed hosts, possessing Susan. Angry that Warren tried to thwart its plans, it kills him and goes forth into the world.

=== "The Door" ===
Writer William Seaton enters the shop, and takes a liking to an ornate door. Although Seaton cannot meet the proprietor’s original asking price, the two eventually agree on a reduced price. The proprietor goes to a back room to write out a receipt, leaving the till open. After Seaton leaves, the proprietor starts counting the money in the till. Seaton's wife Rosemary thinks that the door is too grand for the stationery cupboard where he installs it; when she touches it she has a vision of a sinister blue room. Seaton discovers that the door sometimes becomes a magic portal into the blue room, which he eventually finds the courage to explore. Inside he reads a manuscript by Sir Michael Sinclair, a seventeenth-century occultist who created the enchanted room with rites involving human sacrifices. Periodically Sinclair lures people through the door so that he may take their souls and live forever. Sinclair himself appears and abducts Rosemary for his latest victim, but Seaton has an inspiration and hits the magic door with an axe. Wounds appear on Sinclair's body and his chamber begins to collapse. Seaton fights with the undead magician and rescues Rosemary, who helps him destroy the door. Sinclair and the blue room crumble into nothingness. Back at the shop the proprietor finishes counting the money and finds that none is missing.

=== Epilogue ===
Between the segments a shady character is seen casing the shop. At the end he enters and tries to rob the place, but finds that the proprietor is supernaturally invulnerable to gunfire. Terrified, the thief staggers back, trips, and lands fatally in a large box lined with spikes. The proprietor reflects on the trouble caused by people's greed for money. He then speaks to the audience as though they were his next customer, saying that the shop caters for all tastes, and that each purchase comes with "a big novelty surprise".

== Cast ==
- Peter Cushing as shop proprietor of Temptations Ltd, antiques and objets d'art

=== "The Gatecrasher" ===
- David Warner as Edward Charlton
- Wendy Allnutt as Pamela
- Rosalind Ayres as Edward's first victim, a prostitute
- Tommy Godfrey as Mr Jeffries
- Marcel Steiner as the Mirror Demon

=== "An Act of Kindness" ===
- Ian Bannen as Christopher Lowe, office manager and former sergeant in the Pay Corps
- Donald Pleasence as Jim Underwood, ex-serviceman and pedlar
- Angela Pleasence (Donald Pleasence's daughter) as Emily Underwood, Jim's daughter
- Diana Dors as Mabel Lowe, Christopher's disgruntled wife
- John O'Farrell as Stephen Lowe, Christopher and Mabel's son

=== "The Elemental" ===
- Ian Carmichael as Reggie Warren
- Margaret Leighton as Madam Orloff, a clairvoyant
- Nyree Dawn Porter as Susan Warren, Reggie's wife, "hot stuff" according to Madam Orloff

=== "The Door" ===
- Ian Ogilvy as William Seaton
- Lesley-Anne Down as Rosemary Seaton, William's wife
- Jack Watson as Sir Michael Sinclair, magician from the reign of Charles II

=== Epilogue ===
- Ben Howard as Burglar

== Production ==
=== Development ===
Kevin Connor says that he got the job as director after Milton Subotsky read some scripts he had adapted with some friends. Subotsky took four of them, liked them, and offered Connor the job. Connor pointed out that he had never directed a film before, but Subotsky argued that editors made the best directors. Connor says that the film's budget was "miniscule [sic]".

It was one of a number of horror movies starring Diana Dors.

=== Filming ===
Filming was completed in 1973 in London, England.

== Critical reception ==
Allmovie's review of the film is generally favourable: "The last of the Amicus anthologies is a fun, old-fashioned example of the form."

== See also ==
- List of British films of 1974
