= The Vampire Stories of R. Chetwynd-Hayes =

- Dust-jacket from the first edition
- Author: R. Chetwynd-Hayes
- Illustrator: Jim Pitts
- Cover artist: Les Edwards
- Language: English
- Genre: Horror
- Publisher: Fedogan & Bremer
- Publication date: 1997
- Publication place: United States
- Media type: Print (hardback)
- Pages: xiv, 253 pp
- ISBN: 1-878252-33-X
- OCLC: 38424635

The Vampire Stories of R. Chetwynd-Hayes is a collection of horror short stories by British author R. Chetwynd-Hayes, edited by Stephen Jones. It was released in 1997 by Fedogan & Bremer in an edition of 1,000 copies, of which 100 were signed by the author, editor, illustrator, cover artist and Brian Lumley who wrote the foreword. Most of the stories originally appeared in other anthologies and collections. Currently published under the title Looking for Something to Suck: The Vampire Stories of R. Chetwynd-Hayes.

== Contents ==
- "Foreword: Never Had an Idea in His Life!" by Brian Lumley
- "My Mother Married a Vampire"
- "A Family Welcome"
- "Rudolph"
- "The Labyrinth"
- "The Sad Vampire"
- "Amelia"
- "Acquiring a Family"
- "The Buck"
- "Keep the Gaslight Burning"
- "Birth"
- "Louis"
- "Looking for Something to Suck"
- "Great-Grandad Walks Again"
- "The Fundamental Elemental"
- "The Werewolf and the Vampire"
- "Afterword: Never Beastly to Vampires" by Stephen Jones
