= Stephen Jones (author) =

English editor & author (born 1953)

- Jones at World Fantasy Convention 2026
- Born: 4 November 1953 (age 73); Pimlico, London, England
- Occupations: Editor; writer
- Writing career
- Period: 1988–present
- Genre: Horror fiction

Stephen Jones (born 4 November 1953 in Pimlico, London) is an English editor of horror anthologies, and the author of several book-length studies of horror and fantasy films as well as an account of H. P. Lovecraft's early British publications.

Jones and Kim Newman have edited several books together, including Horror: 100 Best Books, the 1988 horror volume in Xanadu's 100 Best series, and Horror: Another 100 Best Books, a 2005 sequel from Carroll & Graf (US publisher of the earlier series). Each comprises 100 essays by 100 horror writers about 100 horror books and each was recognised by the Horror Writers of America with its annual Bram Stoker Award for Best Non-Fiction.

Jones has edited anthologies such as the Dark Voices, Dark Terrors, Best New Horror series, The Mammoth Book of Vampires, The Mammoth Book of Zombies, The Mammoth Book of Dracula, The Mammoth Book of Frankenstein, The Mammoth Book of Vampire Stories by Women, The Vampire Stories of R. Chetwynd-Hayes, The Conan Chronicles, 1 and The Conan Chronicles, 2 by Robert E. Howard, and Scream Quietly: The Best of Charles L. Grant. Jones also edited Dancing with the Dark, a collection of stories of allegedly real life encounters with the paranormal by established horror writers.

Jones has been the recipient of a Hugo award and many Bram Stoker Awards. His Mammoth book Best New Horror (1990, with Ramsey Campbell) was a World Fantasy Award winner. Volume 29, the most recent installment of the annual anthology, was published in 2019.

== Bibliography ==
=== Non-fiction ===
- Horror: 100 Best Books (with Kim Newman) (1988) ISBN 978-0786705528
- Clive Barker's Shadows in Eden (1991) ISBN 978-0887331718
- James Herbert: By Horror Haunted, ed. (1992) ISBN 978-0450538100
- The Illustrated Vampire Movie Guide (1993) ISBN 978-1852864491
- The Illustrated Frankenstein Movie Guide (1994) ISBN 978-1852865245
- The Frankenstein Scrapbook (1995) ISBN 978-0806516769
- The Illustrated Werewolf Movie Guide (1995) ISBN 978-1852866587
- Clive Barker's A-Z of Horror (1997) (with Clive Barker) ISBN 978-0563371526
- The Essential Monster Movie Guide (1998) ISBN 978-0823079360
- Creepshows: The Illustrated Stephen King Movie Guide (2001) ISBN 978-0823078844
- Horror: Another 100 Best Books (with Kim Newman) (2005) ISBN 978-0786705528
- H. P. Lovecraft in Britain (2007) ISBN 978-0953868193
- Basil Copper: A Life in Books, ed. (2008) ISBN 978-1904619673
- The Art of Horror: An Illustrated History, ed. (2015) ISBN 978-1495009136
- The Art of Horror Movies: An Illustrated History, ed. (2017) ISBN 978-1493063253

== Works as editor ==
=== Anthology series ===
==== Dark Voices ====
1. Dark Voices: The Best from the Pan Book of Horror Stories (1990) with David Sutton
2. Dark Voices 2 (1990) with David Sutton
3. Dark Voices 3 (1991) with David Sutton
4. Dark Voices 4 (1992) with David Sutton
5. Dark Voices 5 (1993) with David Sutton
6. Dark Voices 6: The Pan Book of Horror (1994) with David Sutton

==== Dark Terrors ====
1. Dark Terrors (1995) with David Sutton
2. Dark Terrors 2 (1996) with David Sutton
3. Dark Terrors 3 (1997) with David Sutton
4. Dark Terrors 4 (1998) with David Sutton
5. Dark Terrors 5 (2000) with David Sutton
6. Dark Terrors 6 (2002) with David Sutton

==== Best New Horror ====
1. Best New Horror (1990) with Ramsey Campbell
2. Best New Horror 2 (1991) with Ramsey Campbell
3. Best New Horror 3 (1992) with Ramsey Campbell
4. Best New Horror 4 (1993) with Ramsey Campbell
5. Best New Horror 5 (1994) with Ramsey Campbell
6. Best New Horror 6 (1995)
7. The Mammoth Book of Best New Horror: Volume 7 (1996)
8. The Mammoth Book of Best New Horror: Volume 8 (1997)
9. The Mammoth Book of Best New Horror: Volume 9 (1998)
10. The Mammoth Book of Best New Horror: Volume 10 (1999)
11. The Mammoth Book of Best New Horror: Volume 11 (2000)
12. The Mammoth Book of Best New Horror: Volume 12 (2001)
13. The Mammoth Book of Best New Horror: Volume 13 (2002)
14. The Mammoth Book of Best New Horror: Volume 14 (2003)
15. The Mammoth Book of Best New Horror: Volume 15 (2004)
16. The Mammoth Book of Best New Horror: Volume 16 (2005)
17. The Mammoth Book of Best New Horror: Volume 17 (2006)
18. The Mammoth Book of Best New Horror: Volume 18 (2007)
19. The Mammoth Book of Best New Horror: Volume 19 (2008)
20. The Mammoth Book of Best New Horror: Volume 20 (2009)
21. The Mammoth Book of Best New Horror: Volume 21 (2010)
22. The Mammoth Book of Best New Horror: Volume 22 (2011)
23. The Mammoth Book of Best New Horror: Volume 23 (2012)
24. The Mammoth Book of Best New Horror: Volume 24 (2013)
25. The Mammoth Book of Best New Horror: Volume 25 (2014)
26. Best New Horror 26 (2015)
27. Best New Horror 27 (2017)
28. Best New Horror 28 (2018)
29. Best New Horror 29 (2019)

==== The Mammoth Book of... ====
1. The Mammoth Book of Terror (1991)
2. The Mammoth Book of Vampires (1992)
3. The Mammoth Book of Zombies (1993)
4. The Mammoth Book of Frankenstein (1994)
5. The Mammoth Book of Werewolves (1994)
6. The Mammoth Book of Dracula (1997)
7. The Mammoth Book of New Terror (2004)
8. The Mammoth Book of Monsters (2007)
9. The Mammoth Book of Wolf Men (2009)
10. The Mammoth Book of Zombie Apocalypse! (2010)
11. The Mammoth Book of Zombie Apocalypse! Fightback (2012)
12. Zombie Apocalypse! Endgame (2014)
13. The Mammoth Book of Halloween Stories (2018)
14. The Mammoth Book of Folk Lore: Evil Lives on in the Land! (2021)

=== Standalone Anthologies ===
- Now We Are Sick: An Anthology of Nasty Verse (1991) with Neil Gaiman
- H. P. Lovecraft's Book of Horror (1993) with Dave Carson
- Shadows Over Innsmouth (1994)
- The Anthology of Fantasy & the Supernatural (1994) with David Sutton
- The Giant Book of Terror (1994) with Ramsey Campbell
- Dark of the Night (1997)
- Dark Detectives (1999)
- White of the Moon: New Tales of Madness and Dread (1999)
- Great Ghost Stories (2004) with R. Chetwynd-Hayes
- Weird Shadows Over Innsmouth (2005)
- Tales to Freeze the Blood: More Great Ghost Stories (2006) with R. Chetwynd-Hayes
- H. P. Lovecraft's Book of the Supernatural: Classic Tales of the Macabre (2006)
- Summer Chills: Tales of Vacation Horror (2007)
- The Dead That Walk: Flesh-Eating Stories (2009)
- Visitants: Stories of Fallen Angels & Heavenly Hosts (2010)
- Haunts: Reliquaries of the Dead (2011)
- A Book of Horrors (2011)
- Psycho-Mania! (2013)
- Fearie Tales: Stories of the Grimm and Gruesome (2013)
- Weirder Shadows Over Innsmouth (2013)
- Horrorology (2015)
- In the Shadow of Frankenstein: Tales of the Modern Prometheus (2016)
- In the Footsteps of Dracula: Tales of the Un-Dead Count (2017)
- The Mammoth Book of Nightmare Stories (2019)
- Terrifying Tales to Tell at Night (2019)

== Awards ==
Among his trove of awards, Jones has won & been nominated for multiple International Horror Guild awards in the anthology category between 1995 & 2003. He has also been nominated for or won awards a dozen times for his Fantasy Tales fanzine work with David Sutton.

Work	Year & Award	Category	Result	Ref.
Fantasy Tales (with David Sutton)	1978 World Fantasy Special Award—Non-professional		Nominated	
Fantasy Tales (with David Sutton)	1981 World Fantasy Special Award—Non-professional		Nominated	
Fantasy Tales (with David Sutton)	1982 British Fantasy Award	Small Press	Won	
Fantasy Tales (with David Sutton)	1982 World Fantasy Special Award—Non-professional		Nominated	
Fantasy Tales (with David Sutton)	1983 World Fantasy Special Award—Non-professional		Nominated	
Fantasy Tales (with David Sutton)	1983 British Fantasy Award	Small Press	Won	
Fantasy Tales (with David Sutton)	1984 World Fantasy Special Award—Non-professional		Won	
Fantasy Tales (with David Sutton)	1985 British Fantasy Award	Small Press	Nominated	
Fantasy Tales (with David Sutton)	1986 British Fantasy Award	Small Press	Won	
Fantasy Tales (with David Sutton)	1987 World Fantasy Special Award—Non-professional		Nominated	
Fantasy Tales (with David Sutton)	1987 British Fantasy Award	Small Press	Won	
Fantasy Tales (with David Sutton)	1988 World Fantasy Special Award—Non-professional		Nominated	
Fantasy Media (with Jon M. Harvey, Gordon Larkin & David Sutton)	1981 British Fantasy Award	Small Press	Nominated	
Horror: The 100 Best Books (with Kim Newman)	1989 Bram Stoker Award	Non-Fiction	Won	
Horror: The 100 Best Books (with Kim Newman)	1989 Locus Award	Non-Fiction	Nominated	
Clive Barker's Shadows in Eden	1991 Bram Stoker Award	Non-Fiction	Won	
Clive Barker's Shadows in Eden	1992 Locus Award	Non-Fiction	Nominated	
Clive Barker's Shadows in Eden	1992 Hugo Award	Related Work	Nominated	
Best New Horror (with Ramsey Campbell)	1991 World Fantasy Award	Anthology	Won	
Best New Horror (with Ramsey Campbell)	1991 British Fantasy Award	Collection	Won	
Best New Horror (with Ramsey Campbell)	1991 Locus Award	Anthology	Nominated	
Dark Voices 2: The Pan Book of Horror (with David Sutton)	1991 World Fantasy Award	Anthology	Nominated	
Dark Voices 2: The Pan Book of Horror (with David Sutton)	1991 British Fantasy Award	Anthology/Collection	Nominated	
Dark Voices (with David Sutton)	1992 British Fantasy Award	Anthology/Collection	Nominated	
Best New Horror 3 (with Ramsey Campbell)	1993 Locus Award	Anthology	Nominated	
Dark Voices 5 (with David Sutton)	1994 British Fantasy Award	Collection	Won	
Best New Horror 4 (with Ramsey Campbell)	1994 Locus Award	Anthology	Nominated	
Best New Horror 5 (with Ramsey Campbell)	1995 Locus Award	Anthology	Nominated	
Best New Horror 6	1995 International Horror Guild Award	Anthology	Won	
Best New Horror 6	1996 Locus Award	Anthology	Nominated	
Shadows over Innsmouth	1995 World Fantasy Award	Anthology	Nominated	
The Illustrated Werewolf Movie Guide	1996 Bram Stoker Award	Non-Fiction	Nominated	
Dark Terrors (with David Sutton)	1996 World Fantasy Award	Anthology	Nominated	
Dark Terrors (with David Sutton)	1996 British Fantasy Award	Anthology/Collection	Nominated	
Dark Terrors 2 (with David Sutton)	1997 World Fantasy Award	Anthology	Nominated	
Dark Terrors 2 (with David Sutton)	1997 British Fantasy Award	Anthology/Collection	Nominated	
Clive Barker's A-Z of Horror	1997 Bram Stoker Award	Non-Fiction	Nominated	
The Mammoth Book of Best New Horror 7	1997 British Fantasy Award	Anthology/Collection	Nominated	
Dark Terrors 3 (with David Sutton)	1998 World Fantasy Award	Anthology	Nominated	
Dark Terrors 3 (with David Sutton)	1998 British Fantasy Award	Collection	Won	
Dark Terrors 4 (with David Sutton)	1998 International Horror Guild Award	Anthology	Won	
Dark Terrors 4 (with David Sutton)	1999 World Fantasy Award	Anthology	Nominated	
Dark Terrors 4 (with David Sutton)	1999 British Fantasy Award	Anthology	Won	
Dark Terrors 4 (with David Sutton)	1999 Locus Award	Anthology	Nominated	
The Mammoth Book of Best New Horror	1999 International Horror Guild Award	Anthology	Nominated	
White of the Moon: New Tales of Madness and Dread	1999 International Horror Guild Award	Anthology	Nominated	
White of the Moon: New Tales of Madness and Dread	2000 British Fantasy Award	Anthology/Collection	Nominated	
The Essential Monster Movie Guide	1999 Bram Stoker Award	Non-Fiction	Nominated	
The Essential Monster Movie Guide	2000 World Fantasy Special Award—Professional		Nominated	
The Mammoth Book of Best New Horror 9	1999 British Fantasy Award	Anthology	Nominated	
The Mammoth Book of Best New Horror 9	1999 Locus Award	Anthology	Nominated	
The Mammoth Book of Best New Horror 10	1999 Bram Stoker Award	Anthology	Nominated	
The Mammoth Book of Best New Horror 10	2000 British Fantasy Award	Anthology	Won	
The Mammoth Book of Best New Horror 10	2000 Locus Award	Anthology	Nominated	
Dark Detectives: Adventures of the Supernatural Sleuths	2000 World Fantasy Award	Anthology	Nominated	
Dark Detectives: Adventures of the Supernatural Sleuths	2000 Locus Award	Anthology	Nominated	
Dark Terrors 5 (with David Sutton)	2000 International Horror Guild Award	Anthology	Nominated	
Dark Terrors 5 (with David Sutton)	2001 World Fantasy Award	Anthology	Nominated	
Dark Terrors 5 (with David Sutton)	2001 British Fantasy Award	Anthology	Nominated	
Dark Terrors 5 (with David Sutton)	2001 Locus Award	Anthology	Nominated	
The Mammoth Book of Best New Horror 11	2001 British Fantasy Award	Anthology	Nominated	
The Mammoth Book of Best New Horror 11	2001 Locus Award	Anthology	Nominated	
The Mammoth Book of Vampire Stories by Women	2001 International Horror Guild Award	Anthology	Nominated	
The Mammoth Book of Vampire Stories by Women	2002 World Fantasy Award	Anthology	Nominated	
The Mammoth Book of Vampire Stories by Women	2002 British Fantasy Award	Anthology	Nominated	
The Mammoth Book of Best New Horror 12	2002 World Fantasy Award	Anthology	Nominated	
The Mammoth Book of Best New Horror 12	2002 British Fantasy Award	Anthology	Won	
The Mammoth Book of Best New Horror 12	2002 Locus Award	Anthology	Nominated	
The Mammoth Book of Best New Horror 13	2002 Bram Stoker Award	Anthology	Nominated	
The Mammoth Book of Best New Horror 13	2003 British Fantasy Award	Anthology	Nominated	
The Mammoth Book of Best New Horror 13	2003 Locus Award	Anthology	Nominated	
Dark Terrors 6 (with David Sutton)	2002 International Horror Guild Award	Anthology	Won	
Dark Terrors 6 (with David Sutton)	2003 British Fantasy Award	Anthology	Nominated	
Dark Terrors 6 (with David Sutton)	2003 Locus Award	Anthology	Nominated	
Keep Out The Night	2002 International Horror Guild Award	Anthology	Nominated	
Keep Out The Night	2003 British Fantasy Award	Anthology	Won	
By Moonlight Only	2003 International Horror Guild Award	Anthology	Nominated	
By Moonlight Only	2004 British Fantasy Award	Anthology	Nominated	
The Mammoth Book of Best New Horror 14	2004 British Fantasy Award	Anthology	Won	
The Mammoth Book of Best New Horror 14	2004 Locus Award	Anthology	Nominated	
Horror: Another 100 Best Books (with Kim Newman)	2005 Bram Stoker Award	Non-Fiction	Won	
Horror: Another 100 Best Books (with Kim Newman)	2005 International Horror Guild Award	Non-Fiction	Nominated	
Horror: Another 100 Best Books (with Kim Newman)	2006 Locus Award	Anthology	Nominated	
The Mammoth Book of Best New Horror 15	2005 British Fantasy Award	Anthology	Nominated	
The Mammoth Book of Best New Horror 15	2005 Locus Award	Anthology	Nominated	
Weird Shadows Over Innsmouth	2005 Bram Stoker Award	Anthology	Nominated	
Weird Shadows Over Innsmouth	2006 World Fantasy Award	Anthology	Nominated	
The Mammoth Book of Best New Horror 16	2006 British Fantasy Award	Anthology	Nominated	
Don't Turn Out the Light	2006 British Fantasy Award	Anthology	Nominated	
The Mammoth Book of Best New Horror 17	2007 British Fantasy Award	Anthology	Nominated	
The Mammoth Book of Best New Horror 17	2007 Locus Award	Anthology	Nominated	
The Mammoth Book of Best New Horror 17	2008 FantLab's Book of the Year Award	Anthology	Nominated	
Travellers in Darkness: The Souvenir Book of the World Horror Convention 2007	2008 World Fantasy Special Award—Non-professional		Nominated	
The Mammoth Book of Best New Horror 18	2008 British Fantasy Award	Anthology	Won	
The Mammoth Book of Best New Horror 18	2008 Locus Award	Anthology	Nominated	
The Mammoth Book of Best New Horror 19	2009 British Fantasy Award	Anthology	Won	
The Mammoth Book of Best New Horror 19	2009 Locus Award	Anthology	Nominated	
The Mammoth Book of Monsters	2009 FantLab's Book of the Year Award	Anthology	Nominated	
Basil Copper: A Life in Books (as editor)	2009 British Fantasy Award	Non-Fiction	Won	
The Mammoth Book of Best New Horror 20	2010 British Fantasy Award	Anthology	Won	
Brighton Shock!: The Souvenir Book Of The World Horror Convention 2010 (with Amanda Foubister & Michael Marshall Smith)	2011 World Fantasy Special Award—Non-professional		Nominated	
The Mammoth Book of Zombie Apocalypse!	2011 British Fantasy Award	Anthology	Nominated	
The Mammoth Book of Best New Horror 21	2011 British Fantasy Award	Anthology	Nominated	
The Mammoth Book of Best New Horror 21	2011 Locus Award	Anthology	Nominated	
A Book of Horrors	2011 Shirley Jackson Award	Anthology	Nominated	
A Book of Horrors	2012 World Fantasy Award	Anthology	Nominated	
A Book of Horrors	2012 British Fantasy Award	Anthology	Nominated	
A Book of Horrors	2012 Locus Award	Anthology	Nominated	
The Mammoth Book of Best New Horror 22	2012 Locus Award	Anthology	Nominated	
The Mammoth Book of Best New Horror 23	2013 Locus Award	Anthology	Nominated	
The Mammoth Book of Best New Horror 24	2014 Locus Award	Anthology	Nominated	
Fearie Tales: Stories of the Grimm and Gruesome	2014 British Fantasy Award	Anthology	Nominated	
Flotsam Fantastique: The Souvenir Book of World Fantasy Convention 2013	2014 World Fantasy Award	Anthology	Nominated	
The Art of Horror	2015 Bram Stoker Award	Non-Fiction	Won	
The Art of Horror	2016 World Fantasy Special Award—Professional		Won	
The Art of Horror	2016 British Fantasy Award	Anthology	Nominated	
The Art of Horror Movies: An Illustrated History	2017 Bram Stoker Award	Non-Fiction	Nominated	
The Art of Horror Movies: An Illustrated History	2017 Rondo Hatton Classic Horror Award	Book of the Year	Won	
Best New Horror 28	2019 World Fantasy Award	Anthology	Nominated	
The Mammoth Book of Folk Horror	2021 Rondo Hatton Classic Horror Award	Classic Horror Fiction	Runner-up	
The Weird Tales Boys	2024 World Fantasy Special Award—Professional		Won	
The Weird Tales Boys	2024 Robert E. Howard Awards	The Atlantean (Outstanding Achievement, Book)	Won	
	1982 Balrog Award	Amateur Achievement	Nominated	
	2006 British Fantasy Award	Karl Edward Wagner Award	Won	
	2013 Bram Stoker Award	Lifetime Achievement	Won	
