= Dark Detectives =

1999 short story anthology

- Dust-jacket from the first edition
- Editor: Stephen Jones
- Illustrator: Randy Broeker
- Cover artist: Les Edwards
- Language: English
- Genre: Fantasy, horror and detective
- Publisher: F & B Mystery
- Publication date: 1999
- Publication place: United States
- Media type: Print (hardcover)
- Pages: 424
- ISBN: 1-878252-35-6
- OCLC: 43515357

Dark Detectives: Adventures of the Supernatural Sleuths is an anthology of occult detective stories edited by Stephen Jones. It was published by F & B Mystery in 1999 in an edition of 2,100 copies, of which 100 were signed by all the contributors except R. Chetwynd-Hayes. It contains 10 stories and a novella, Seven Stars, whose episodes are interspersed among the stories. Several of the stories first appeared in collections, or in the magazines The Idler, Kadath and Time Out.

It was republished in 2015 by Titan Books.

== Contents ==
- "Introduction: The Serial Sleuths", by Stephen Jones
- "Seven Stars Prologue: In Egypt’s Land", by Kim Newman
- "Our Lady of Death", by Peter Tremayne (features Sister Fidelma)
- "Seven Stars Episode One: The Mummy’s Heart", by Kim Newman (features Charles Beauregard of the Diogenes Club)
- "The Horse of the Invisible", by William Hope Hodgson (features Thomas Carnacki)
- "Seven Stars Episode Two: The Magician and the Matinee Idol", by Kim Newman (features Edwin Winthrop and Catriona Kaye)
- "The Adventure of the Crawling Horror", by Basil Copper (features Solar Pons)
- "Seven Stars Episode Three: The Trouble with Barrymore", by Kim Newman (features The Gumshoe)
- "Rouse Him Not", by Manly Wade Wellman (features John Thunstone)
- "De Marigny’s Clock", by Brian Lumley (features Titus Crow)
- "Seven Stars Episode Four: The Biafran Bank Manager", by Kim Newman (features Richard Jeperson of the Diogenes Club)
- "Someone Is Dead", by R. Chetwynd-Hayes (features Francis St. Clare and Frederica Masters)
- "Vultures Gather", by Brian Mooney (features Reuban Calloway and Roderick Shea
- "Lost Souls", by Clive Barker (features Harry D'Amour)
- "Seven Stars Episode Five: Mimsy", by Kim Newman (features Sally Rhodes)
- "The Man Who Shot the Man Who Shot The Man Who Shot Liberty Valence", by Jay Russell (features Marty Burns)
- "Seven Stars Episode Six: The Dog Story", by Kim Newman (features Jerome Rhodes)
- "Bay Wolf", by Neil Gaiman (features Larry Talbot)
- "Seven Stars Episode Seven: The Duel of Seven Stars", by Kim Newman (features Geneviève Dieudonné)
