= Torture Garden (film) =

1967 British film by Freddie Francis

- Theatrical release poster
- Directed by: Freddie Francis
- Written by: Robert Bloch
- Based on: short stories by Bloch: "Enoch", "The Man Who Collected Poe", "Terror Over Hollywood", "Mr Steinway"
- Produced by: Max Rosenberg; Milton Subotsky
- Starring: Jack Palance; Burgess Meredith; Beverly Adams; Peter Cushing
- Cinematography: Norman Warwick
- Edited by: Peter Elliott
- Music by: Don Banks; James Bernard
- Production company: Amicus Productions
- Distributed by: Columbia Pictures
- Release dates: 10 November 1967 (UK); 6 September 1968 (US)
- Running time: 100 minutes
- Country: United Kingdom
- Language: English
- Budget: $500,000

Torture Garden is a 1967 British horror film directed by Freddie Francis and starring Burgess Meredith, Jack Palance, Michael Ripper, Beverly Adams, Peter Cushing, Maurice Denham, Ursula Howells, Michael Bryant and Barbara Ewing. The score was a collaboration between Hammer horror regulars James Bernard and Don Banks.

Made by Amicus Productions, it is one of producer Milton Subotsky's trademark "portmanteau" films, an omnibus of short stories (in this case all by Psycho author Robert Bloch, who adapted his own work for the screenplay) linked by a single narrative. Freddie Francis said Martin Scorsese wanted him to make a film about the life of Edgar Allan Poe because he so admired Torture Garden.

== Plot ==
Prologue

Five people visit a fairground sideshow run by showman Dr. Diabolo. Having shown them a handful of haunted house-style attractions, he promises them a genuinely scary experience if they will pay extra. Their curiosity gets the better of them, and the small crowd follows him behind a curtain, where they each view their fate through the shears of an effigy of the female deity Atropos.

Enoch

Colin Williams, a greedy playboy takes advantage of his dying uncle Roger, and falls under the spell of a man-eating cat.

Terror Over Hollywood

Carla Hayes, a Hollywood starlet, discovers her co-stars are androids.

Mr. Steinway

A possessed Bechstein grand piano by the name of Euterpe becomes jealous of its owner Leo Winston's new lover Dorothy Endicott and takes revenge.

The Man Who Collected Poe

Ronald Wyatt, a Poe collector, murders Lancelot Canning, another collector over a collectable he refuses to show him, only to find it is Edgar Allan Poe himself.

Epilogue

Gordon Roberts, the fifth patron, goes berserk and uses the shears of Atropos to "kill" Dr. Diabolo in front of the others, causing them to panic and flee. It is then shown that he is working for Diabolo, and the whole thing was faked. As they congratulate each other for their acting, it is then revealed that Ronald had not run off like the others, and he too commends their performance, sharing a brief exchange with Diabolo and lighting a cigarette for him before leaving (using the same lighter he borrowed in his vision, implying that the events actually happened). Diabolo puts the shears back into the hand of Atropos, and then breaks the fourth wall by addressing three words to the audience, thereby revealing himself actually to be the devil.

== Cast ==
- Jack Palance as Ronald Wyatt
- Burgess Meredith as Dr. Diabolo
- Beverly Adams as Carla Hayes
- Peter Cushing as Lancelot Canning
- Michael Bryant as Colin Williams
- Barbara Ewing as Dorothy Endicott
- John Standing as Leo
- John Phillips as Storm
- Michael Ripper as Gordon Roberts
- Bernard Kay as Dr. Heim
- Maurice Denham as Uncle Roger
- Ursula Howells as Miss Chambers
- David Bauer as Charles
- Niall MacGinnis as Doctor
- Hedger Wallace as Edgar Allan Poe

== Production ==
The film was meant to star Peter Cushing and Christopher Lee; however, Columbia, which was providing the budget, wanted two American names, and this led to Jack Palance and Burgess Meredith's casting, with Cushing cast in a smaller role.

The film was shot at Shepperton Studios, London, England.

== Critical reception ==
Monthly Film Bulletin wrote:

Robert Bloch has here concocted a lusty and highly enjoyable Gothic exercise, sparked with something of the same truculent wit as Psycho; and Freddie Francis has seized the opportunity to do his best work since The Psychopath with his gently prowling camera creating four clever variations in style, from the Grand Guignol of the cat who likes eating human heads to the moody atmospherics of the possessive piano. Best of the four episodes is the last, with Peter Cushing setting a high standard in collector's boasts when he explains how his father resuscitated the dead writer ("He even collected Poe himself"), but being easily topped by Jack Palance who actually becomes a character in the Master's works, and goes up in flames with huge delight as the cobwebby Poe cackles "Is that not a fine ending for the last story of Edgar Allan Poe?". Palance, eyes glinting with manic desire as he fondles the Poe treasures he cannot buy, and chuckling with delight at each new horror as he finds himself becoming part of the Poe legend, gives a superbly judged performance which is almost matched by John Standing (so good in The Psychopath) in the preceding episode. Standing's brilliant portrayal of encroaching dementia, coyly whispering "Shall we play something for the lady?" to his ebony piano as it stands in majestic isolation in a room with a shining, delicately black-and white striped floor (the décor here, as throughout, is excellent) almost makes one forget the rather routine script. Much more imaginative as a story – but unfortunately less well done – is the Hollywood episode, with its pleasantly fanciful vision of the great stars as ageless automata covered by a thin layer of human skin. Much too confused as a narrative and not particularly well acted, this episode really comes into its own only at the end, as the actress attends a premiere after her robotisation and the delighted fans cry "Isn't she a doll ... a living doll?". Less interesting, although undeniably effective as a straightforward shocker (Bloch's original story, "Enoch", was much subtler), is the opening episode with a distraught Michael Bryant locked in his cell, waiting for a visit from the cat when he is ravenous enough to come looking for a convenient head. The film, in fact, gets steadily better as it goes on, eventually achieving a subtlety and wit which one is not led to expect by the cheerful bluster of the opening as Burgess Meredith's sneering Mephistopheles vaunts the attractions of his luridly rococo torture garden; and the ambiguous ending, with its suggestion that the Poe collector has seen in the future something that has already happened in the past, is perhaps the nicest touch of all."

The Radio Times Guide to Films gave the film 3/5 stars, writing: "A group of fairground visitors are shown their futures by the strange Dr. Diabolo (Burgess Meredith) in one of the better compendium chillers from Amicus, Hammer's main British horror rival. Robert (Psycho) Bloch's skilful script, which includes cannibal cats, haunted pianos, eternal Hollywood life and the reincarnation of Edgar Allan Poe, gives director Freddie Francis imaginative opportunities to indulge in stylish camerawork for maximum gothic effect."

AllMovie wrote: "Torture Garden lacks the strength and inventiveness to qualify as a top-tier horror anthology but it offers enough spooky thrills to qualify as a Saturday afternoon diversion." Leslie Halliwell wrote: "Crude but effective horror portmanteau including one story about the resurrection of Edgar Allen Poe" [sic].
