= Douglas Gamley =

Australian composer and orchestrator (1924–1998)

- Born: John Douglas Gamley; 13 September 1924; Melbourne, Australia
- Died: 5 February 1998 (aged 73); London, England
- Occupation: Composer

John Douglas Gamley (13 September 1924 – 5 February 1998) was an Australian composer, who worked on orchestral arrangements and on local, British and American films.

== Biography ==
Douglas Gamley was born on 13 September 1924 in Melbourne to John McKenzie Gamley and his wife, Helen "Nellie" (née Patrick). Less than a fortnight later, Nellie died on 26 September 1924.

One of Gamley's early teachers was Waldemar Seidel in Melbourne. In September 1944 Gamley appeared as a solo pianist with the ABC Symphony Orchestra at the Melbourne Town Hall. His performance was described by The Argus' reviewer: he "showed brilliance" including his effort on "Liszt's A major concerto (No 2) [which] had an assured technique, but can still go a long way before his powers as an interpreter of his composer are fully used." In November of that year, as a student at the Melbourne Conservatorium of Music, he played piano alongside Ann Molan on violin for César Franck's Violin Sonata and Édouard Lalo's Symphonie espagnole.

Gamley was particularly influenced by Modest Mussorgsky, creating a full orchestral version of his Pictures at an Exhibition, and adapting his Night on Bald Mountain for his score for the horror feature film Asylum (1972). David Nice reviewed "The Bogatyr (Heroes') Gate at Kiev" from Mussorgsky's Pictures at an Exhibition and felt that "few have gone quite as far as the brilliant Australian-born arranger and film-score composer [Gamley]", and that he provided "a happier meeting" with Mussorgsky's work than that in Asylum. Gamley adapted Gabriel Fauré's Pavane for The Monster Club (1980).

Gamley composed soundtracks for Amicus Productions, including Asylum (1972), Tales From the Crypt (1972), The Vault of Horror (1973), And Now the Screaming Starts (1973), From Beyond the Grave (1974), Madhouse (1974) and The Land that Time Forgot (1974).

Gamley worked as an accompanist with guest conductor Michael Moores on a recording of the Elston Hall Choir singing Sacred and Secular Music. It is assumed the recording was made available on a very-limited vinyl release in 1967 bearing the catalogue number "E.H. 67-3". One 33 1/3 rpm mono example of the record, made in England, is known to exist. The recording features on side one: 1. O Esca Viatorum (Philips), 2. I Waited for the Lord (Mendelssohn), 3. The Lord's My Shepherd (Bain), 4. Rejoice Greatly (Handel); and on side two: 1. Bald prangt, den Morgen zu verkünden (Mozart), 2. Spinning Chorus (Wagner), 3. Non lo dirò col labbro (Handel), 4. Nymphs and Shepherds (Purcell).

Gamley created many arrangements for Joan Sutherland, Richard Bonynge, and Kiri Te Kanawa, both for performing and recordings, such as highlights from Lehar's "The Merry Widow." He also made orchestral arrangements of songs for Luciano Pavarotti and Victoria de los Ángeles. He was associated for many years with the Australian Pops Orchestra as conductor and arranger. According to AllMusic's Bruce Elder, Gamley wrote "'stock music' for the BBC library" including for the Doctor Who TV series; he also wrote for the soundtrack of the Disney feature film, Tron (1982).

Gamley died on 5 February 1998 in Highgate, London.

== Selected filmography ==
- Fire Down Below (1957)
- The Admirable Crichton (1957)
- Another Time, Another Place (1958)
- Gideon's Day (1958)
- Death Over My Shoulder (1958)
- Tom Thumb (1958)
- Beyond This Place (1959)
- Tarzan's Greatest Adventure (1959)
- The Ugly Duckling (1959)
- The Rough and the Smooth (1959)
- Foxhole in Cairo (1960)
- The City of the Dead (1960)
- The Canadians (1961)
- Carry On Cruising (1962)
- The Horror of It All (1963)
- The Return of Mr. Moto (1965)
- Spring and Port Wine (1970)
- And Now for Something Completely Different (1971)
- Asylum (1972)
- Tales from the Crypt (1972)
- And Now the Screaming Starts! (1973)
- The Vault of Horror (1973)
- From Beyond the Grave (1974)
- The Beast Must Die (1974)
- Madhouse (1974)
- The Land That Time Forgot (1974)
- The Monster Club (1980)
