= The Psychopath (1966 film) =

British film by Freddie Francis

- UK theatrical release poster
- Directed by: Freddie Francis
- Written by: Robert Bloch
- Produced by: Max Rosenberg; Milton Subotsky
- Starring: Patrick Wymark
- Cinematography: John Wilcox
- Edited by: Oswald Hafenrichter
- Music by: Elisabeth Lutyens
- Color process: Technicolor
- Production company: Amicus Productions
- Distributed by: Paramount British Pictures
- Release date: February 4, 1966
- Running time: 82 minutes
- Country: United Kingdom
- Language: English

The Psychopath (also known as Schizo) is a 1966 British horror film directed by Freddie Francis and starring Patrick Wymark and Margaret Johnston. It was written by Robert Bloch and was an Amicus production.

== Plot ==
Police inspector Holloway investigates a string of murders where the victims have dolls attached to their bodies. The trail soon leads to a disabled German woman named Mrs. Ilsa Von Sturm, who knows a set of dark secrets that may hold the key to the murders.

It develops that Mrs. Von Sturm's late husband Hedwig was found guilty of war crimes and the family's multi-million dollar estate seized by the Allies. Four murder victims were a part of that Allied War crimes tribunal, and they may have illegally seized the industrial empire for themselves, which would give the Von Sturm family good reason for personal vengeance.

The murderer's M.O., except for the leaving of the realistically carved dolls, differs with each killing. Inspector Holloway, who at times can seem like the only sane man in London, doggedly pursues the case to a successful conclusion...and salvages the romance of Louise Saville and her number one suspect fiancé, Donald Loftis, a medical student with the presumed technical knowledge to commit the murders.

== Cast ==
- Patrick Wymark as Inspector Holloway
- Margaret Johnston as Mrs. Ilsa Von Sturm
- John Standing as Mark Von Sturm
- Alexander Knox as Frank Saville
- Judy Huxtable as Louise Saville
- Don Borisenko as Donald Loftis
- Thorley Walters as Martin Roth
- Robert Crewdson as Victor Ledoux
- Colin Gordon as Dr. Glyn
- Tim Barrett as Morgan
- John Harvey as Reinhardt Klermer
- Harold Lang as Briggs
- Peter Diamond as junk yard proprietor
- Gina Gianelli as Gina

== Production ==
Shooting started September 1965. The Psychopath was an attempt to capitalize on the success of Hammer Films' recent series of psychological thrillers, including Taste of Fear (1961).

Robert Bloch recalls in his autobiography Once Around the Bloch: An Unauthorized Autobiography being taken with his wife Eleanor Zalisko Alexander to the country in England by Ronald Kirkbride, and "the next morning a limo took us to Shepperton Studios, where we lunched after watching Freddy Francis helm a scene for The Psychopath. The scene that morning was one I had indicated as taking place at the bottom of a staircase leading to the upper floor of a house. But everything they actually shot now took place at the top of a staircase which descended to the cellar. What I wrote up they put down. And when I took director Francis aside and questioned him about the change he pointed out that building a set with a stairway was expensive. Shooting from a high angle into the redressed recess beneath a soundstage trapdoor saved money. In other words, I was right back on The Couch (1962) with The Night Walker (1964). A low-budget film always operates on the same principle, that is to say, no principle whatsoever except saving a buck, even if it means losing the potential of the picture".

== Reception ==
The Monthly Film Bulletin wrote: "Despite the variable colour and some confusion in the tortuous script, this is an outstandingly enjoyable who-dunnit. Or rather, it begins as a who-dunnit – with the long murder sequence of the opening being followed by the Inspector's visit to a quiet, old-fashioned salon where three members of a string quartet gravely indulge in Mozart while awaiting their colleague – and gradually shifts gear until it blossoms into a fully-fledged horror film. Much less flashy with his camera than usual, Freddie Francis is content to let his scenes speak for themselves ... Much of the pleasure comes from a really splendid cast, with Margaret Johnston enjoying herself hugely as the crazy widow, and Patrick Wymark much less mannered than he has been of late. John Standing, restless, explosive, and with just the suggestion of a manic prance in his step as he plays cat-and-mouse with the Inspector, is equally good. ... It is a pity, though, that the attractive compositions and art direction are constantly let down by indifferent colour processing."

The Radio Times Guide to Films gave the film 1/5 stars, writing: "Hammer's main rival, Amicus, produced some highly original shockers but, despite a screenplay by Robert Bloch, author of Psycho, this isn't one of them. Once again, a psychopath murders his enemies one by one, leaving a model of the victim next to each body, and it doesn't take much imagination to work out who the culprit is. There's little atmosphere, and Margaret Johnston overplays to the point of burlesque."

Leslie Halliwell said: "Complicated horror thriller in which the actors go further over the top the more the plot winds down." Michael Weldon writes of the film as "a good shocker".

The film was very popular in Europe, particularly Italy.
