= Peter Tanner =

British film editor (1914–2002)

- Born: 13 September 1914; Tilford, Surrey, England
- Died: 10 December 2002 (aged 88); Stoke Poges, Buckinghamshire, England
- Occupation: Editor
- Years active: 1937–1998 (film and TV)

Peter Tanner (13 September 1914 – 10 December 2002) was a British film editor. After beginning his career editing quota quickies in the 1930s, he then worked on documentaries during the Second World War. He briefly worked with Alfred Hitchcock in 1945, editing footage of the liberated concentration camps. He was later employed by Ealing Studios, working on films such as Kind Hearts and Coronets and The Blue Lamp.

During the mid-1960s he edited a number of episodes of The Avengers television series. He had a lengthy career lasting into the late 1990s.

== Selected filmography ==
- Double Alibi (1937)
- Murder in the Family (1938)
- Dial 999 (1938)
- Lady from Lisbon (1942)
- Sabotage at Sea (1942)
- Kind Hearts and Coronets (1949)
- Cage of Gold (1950)
- The Blue Lamp (1950)
- Pool of London (1951)
- The Gentle Gunman (1952)
- I Believe in You (1952)
- Secret People (1952)
- The Cruel Sea (1953)
- Lease of Life (1954)
- Touch and Go (1955)
- The Night My Number Came Up (1955)
- Who Done It? (1956)
- The Man in the Sky (1957)
- Davy (1958)
- The Angry Hills (1959)
- A Terrible Beauty (1960)
- Light Up the Sky! (1960)
- Greyfriars Bobby (1961)
- Sodom and Gomorrah (1962)
- Tamahine (1963)
- A Jolly Bad Fellow (1964)
- Diamonds for Breakfast (1968)
- The Best House in London (1969)
- I, Monster (1971)
- The House That Dripped Blood (1971)
- What Became of Jack and Jill? (1972)
- Asylum (1972)
- And Now the Screaming Starts! (1973)
- The Beast Must Die (1974)
- The Maids (1975)
- Hedda (1975)
- Spectre (1977)
- Wombling Free (1977)
- The Thief of Baghdad (1978)
- Game for Vultures (1979)
- The Hard Way (1980)
- The Monster Club (1981)
- Merlin and the Sword (1985)
- Turtle Diary (1985)
- Hamburger Hill (1987)
- Taffin (1988)
- Eminent Domain (1990)
- Robin Hood (1991)
- Widows' Peak (1994)
- A Month by the Lake (1995)
- Something to Believe In (1998)

== Bibliography ==
- Antoine de Baecque. Camera Historica: The Century in Cinema. Columbia University Press, 2012.
