= John Wilcox (cinematographer) =

British cinematographer (1913–1979)

- Wilcox during the production of Daleks' Invasion Earth 2150 A.D. (1966)
- Born: John Laurence Wolcox; 7 May 1913; Stoke-on-Trent, Staffordshire England
- Died: 31 May 1979 (aged 66); Torbay, Devon, England
- Occupation: Cinematographer

John Laurence Wilcox, BSC (7 May 1913 – 31 May 1979) was a British cinematographer. He frequently worked with director Freddie Francis and photographed many popular British films, including Carve Her Name with Pride, Summer Holiday and Dr. Who and the Daleks.

The nephew of the director and producer Herbert Wilcox, he began his film career in 1930 as an often uncredited second camera assistant to Freddie Young. His involvement as a cameraman included work on The Third Man and Outcast of the Islands, and made his debut as chief camera operator in 1951 with Mr. Denning Drives North.

== Selected filmography ==
- 1951: Mr. Denning Drives North
- 1951: Outcast of the Islands
- 1954: Hell Below Zero
- 1954: The Black Knight
- 1955: The Cockleshell Heroes
- 1956: Safari
- 1958: Harry Black
- 1958: Carve Her Name with Pride
- 1959: The Mouse that Roared
- 1959: Expresso Bongo
- 1959: A Touch of Larceny
- 1961: Mr. Topaze
- 1962: Only Two Can Play
- 1962: Waltz of theToreadors
- 1963: Summer Holiday
- 1964: Nightmare
- 1964: The Evil of Frankenstein
- 1965: The Skull
- 1966: The Psychopath
- 1966: Daleks' Invasion Earth 2150 A.D.
- 1967: The Deadly Bees
- 1968: The Limbo Line
- 1969: The Chairman
- 1970: Connecting Rooms
- 1971: The Last Valley
- 1972: Steptoe & Son
- 1973: The Belstone Fox
- 1974: Craze
- 1974: The Legend of the 7 Golden Vampires
- 1975: The Ghoul
- 1978: The Hound of the Baskervilles
