= Weird Shadows Over Innsmouth =

- Dust-jacket from the first edition
- Author: edited by Stephen Jones
- Illustrator: Randy Broecker, Les Edwards, Bob Eggleton and Allan Servoss
- Cover artist: Bob Eggleton
- Language: English
- Genre: Fantasy, horror
- Publisher: Fedogan & Bremer
- Publication date: 2005
- Publication place: United States
- Media type: Print (hardback)
- Pages: 297 pp
- ISBN: 1-878252-56-9
- OCLC: 68226528

Weird Shadows Over Innsmouth is an anthology of Cthulhu Mythos stories edited by Stephen Jones. It was published by Fedogan & Bremer in 2005 in an edition of 2,100 copies of which 100 were signed. The anthology contains a discarded draft of the H. P. Lovecraft novella "The Shadow Over Innsmouth" and several stories by other authors written as sequels to the Lovecraft story. Eight of the stories are original to this collection. Others first appeared in the magazines The Acolyte and The Spook or in anthologies.

== Contents ==
- "Introduction: Weird Shadows...", by Stephen Jones
- "Discarded Draft of 'The Shadows Over Innsmouth'", by H. P. Lovecraft
- "The Quest for Y'ha-nthlei", by John Glasby
- "Brackish Waters", by Richard A. Lupoff
- "Voices in the Water", by Basil Copper
- "Another Fish Story", by Kim Newman
- "Take Me to the River", by Paul McAuley
- "The Coming", by Hugh B. Cave
- "Eggs", by Steve Rasnic Tem
- "From Cabinet 34, Drawer 6", by Caitlín R. Kiernan
- "Raised by the Moon", by Ramsey Campbell
- "Fair Exchange", by Michael Marshall Smith
- "The Taint", by Brian Lumley
- "Afterwords: Contributors' Notes"
