= The Best New Horror: Volume 7 =

- Author: Stephen Jones
- Language: English
- Publication date: 1996

The Best New Horror: Volume 7 is a 1996 novel written by Stephen Jones.

== Plot summary ==
The Best New Horror: Volume 7 is a novel in which an anthology collects short horror fiction from the previous year. It offers stories that span genres and themes. Notable entries include Michael Marshall Smith's darkly humorous internet tale; Paul J. McAuley's postmodern riff on Dr. Moreau with an unresolved ending; Stephen Gallagher's tense paranoia in "Not Here, Not Now"; Brian Stableford's vampire twist; Douglas E. Winter's dive into obsessive behavior in "Loop"; and Ian R. MacLeod's Arctic narrative "Tirkiluk," with themes of isolation and survival.

== Reception ==
Gideon Kibblewhite reviewed The Best New Horror: Volume 7 for Arcane magazine, rating it an 8 out of 10 overall, and stated that "stories included in the collection are marked with a poise and a quality of writing which makes this annual anthology a valuable addition to any library, and not just a horror fan's. The amazing array of genres, eras, characters, themes and situations also make it a book no self-respecting referee should be without."

== Reviews ==
- Review by Joel Lane (1997) in All Hallows, February 1997
- Review by David Griffin (1998) in The New York Review of Science Fiction, January 1998
