= And Now the Screaming Starts! =

1973 British film by Roy Ward Baker

- US theatrical release poster
- Directed by: Roy Ward Baker
- Screenplay by: Roger Marshall
- Based on: Fengriffen by David Case
- Produced by: Max J. Rosenberg; Milton Subotsky
- Starring: Peter Cushing; Herbert Lom; Patrick Magee; Stephanie Beacham; Ian Ogilvy; Geoffrey Whitehead
- Cinematography: Denys Coop
- Edited by: Peter Tanner
- Music by: Douglas Gamley
- Production companies: Amicus Productions; Harbor Productions
- Distributed by: Fox-Rank
- Release date: 27 April 1973
- Running time: 91 minutes
- Country: United Kingdom
- Language: English
- Budget: $500,000

And Now the Screaming Starts! (also known as Fengriffen and Bride of Fengriffen) is a 1973 British gothic horror film directed by Roy Ward Baker. It stars Peter Cushing, Herbert Lom, Patrick Magee, Stephanie Beacham and Ian Ogilvy. It is one of the few feature-length horror stories by Amicus, a company best known for anthology or "portmanteau" films. Baker felt the title was "silly".

The screenplay, written by Roger Marshall, is based on the 1970 novella Fengriffen by David Case.

== Plot ==
In 1795, after moving to her fiancé Charles Fengriffen's family estate, Catherine experiences visions of an undead corpse with a heavily birthmarked face, empty eye sockets and a severed right hand. On her wedding night, she is attacked and raped by an evil spirit in her bedroom at Fengriffen House. Later, she is disturbed to encounter Silas, a woodsman who lives in a nearby lodge and has a birthmark identical to the corpse's. Charles and others are reluctant to tell her anything about Silas, and those who try to answer her questions are killed in bizarre circumstances: Maitland, Charles' solicitor, is hacked to death with an axe; Mrs Luke, the housemaid, is thrown down the stairs; and Aunt Edith, Catherine's chaperone, is strangled by the severed hand, which then vanishes.

Announcing that Catherine is pregnant, physician Dr Whittle urges Charles to tell her the story of the estate's dark past. Charles refuses, believing it to be nothing more than a legend. Deciding that Catherine's visions are the result of mental disorder, he instead sends for psychiatrist Dr Pope. Pope approaches the mystery with an open mind and almost forces the truth out of Whittle, but before Whittle can speak, the hand re‑materialises, strangles him, and vanishes again.

Pope confronts Charles, who recounts the crimes of his debauched grandfather, Sir Henry Fengriffen. Some 50 years earlier, Henry raped the bride of his servant, Silas – whose son, the woodsman, is the spitting image of his father. When Silas tried to kill Henry in revenge, Henry cut off Silas' right hand as punishment. Silas cursed the Fengriffens, vowing that the next virgin bride to enter Fengriffen House would be raped and her child tainted, and anyone trying to warn her would die. Henry later showed remorse and bequeathed Silas land, where the son has stayed to watch his dead father's threat come to fruition. As Charles' mother was a widow before she married Charles' father, Catherine is the first virgin bride to arrive at the estate since the curse was placed.

Pope agrees to stay with the Fengriffens until Catherine gives birth. When she goes into labour, he sedates her and delivers the baby, whose appearance leaves Charles aghast. Charles heads to Silas' lodge and shoots the woodsman in the face with a pair of pistols. Pope follows and finds Silas dead on the floor with a shot through each eye, matching the corpse that Catherine saw. Charles then sets about smashing open Henry's grave and destroying his remains, beating Pope away when the doctor tries to stop him. Pope returns to Catherine and presents the baby – which, like the older Silas, has a birthmarked face and no right hand.

== Cast ==
- Peter Cushing as Dr. Pope
- Herbert Lom as Sir Henry Fengriffen
- Patrick Magee as Dr. Whittle
- Stephanie Beacham as Catherine Fengriffen
- Ian Ogilvy as Charles Fengriffen
- Geoffrey Whitehead as Woodsman / Silas
- Guy Rolfe as Lawyer Maitland
- Rosalie Crutchley as Mrs. Luke
- Gillian Lind as Aunt Edith
- Janet Key as Bridget
- Sally Harrison as Sarah

== Production ==
=== Filming locations ===
The large gothic house used in the film is Oakley Court, near Bray village, which is now a four-star hotel.

== Release ==
In the UK, And Now the Screaming Starts! went out on a double bill with the American horror film, Doctor Death: Seeker of Souls.

== Critical reception ==
Jonathan Rosenbaum wrote for The Monthly Film Bulletin wrote: "A potentially effective Gothic piece that never quite convinces or meshes, . . . And Now the Screaming Starts! has to contend with at least three imposing handicaps. There's an awkward performance by Stephanie Beacham, who amply heaves her ample bosom whenever the horrors warrant it, but is less successful at gradating or controlling her frightened facial expressions and screams – admittedly no easy matter when the script ... dictates these effusions at nearly every turn in the plot. Indeed, a heaping on of repetitive horror-visions simply leads to a diffusion of effect ... Unhappiest of all, Denys Coop's graceful camerawork ... is severely compromised by the unfortunate lab work it has suffered. Roughly the first forty minutes of the film and the final fifteen are rendered in a greenish tint which is striking, but hardly congruent with the more conventional palette of colours that prevails between these two sections."

A. H. Weiler reviewing the work in The New York Times commended Cushing's contribution, deeming it superior to the rest of the cast's, although considered its plot contrived.

Mark Burger, reviewing a home video release for the Winston-Salem Journal in 2002, noted the strong cast but found the muddled screenplay led to a merely "watchable" film.

In a review published in 2006, Stuart Galbraith IV called the film "only fitfully effective", criticising what he considered a lack of character development: "the film parades one series of strange-goings-on and other horror set pieces after another, but without compelling characters to hang them on they just don't make much of an impact."
