= They Came from Beyond Space =

1967 British film by Freddie Francis

- Theatrical release poster
- Directed by: Freddie Francis
- Written by: Milton Subotsky
- Based on: The Gods Hate Kansas; Joseph Millard
- Produced by: Max Rosenberg (producer); Milton Subotsky (producer)
- Starring: Robert Hutton; Jennifer Jayne; Zia Mohyeddin
- Cinematography: Norman Warwick
- Edited by: Peter Musgrave
- Music by: James Stevens
- Production company: Amicus Productions
- Distributed by: Anglo Embassy
- Release date: 1 May 1967
- Running time: 85 minutes
- Country: United Kingdom
- Language: English

They Came from Beyond Space is a 1967 British Eastmancolor science fiction film directed by Freddie Francis and starring Robert Hutton, Jennifer Jayne, Zia Mohyeddin and Bernard Kay. It was produced by Max J. Rosenberg and Milton Subotsky. The screenplay was by Subotsky, based on the 1941 novel The Gods Hate Kansas by Joseph Millard.

The narrative follows the adventures of a scientist who tries to stop space aliens who are made of pure energy from enslaving humans in order to rebuild their spaceship so that they can return to their home planet.

The film is from Amicus Productions who released the film as a double bill with The Terrornauts (1967).

== Plot ==
An unusual V-shaped formation of meteorites has fallen in Cornwall. Scientists are appointed to investigate. However, their leader, Dr. Curtis Temple, who is recovering from an automobile accident and has a silver plate in his skull, is forbidden by his physician from going. Curtis turns the mission over to Lee Mason, his colleague and lover.

Arriving at the site, the scientists find the meteorites to be unusual in shape and colour – they are rather pointy and blue. They also house aliens who exist as "pure energy". A geologist attempts to chisel off a piece of meteorite. As a result, the rock emits a flash of light and a screech as the aliens take over the scientists' bodies and minds.

Concerned that the only contact with Lee has been her requisitions for millions of pounds' worth of equipment – including weapons – Curtis decides to visit the site despite his MD's orders. But before he leaves, a fellow scientist determines that the meteorites have come from the Moon.

Upon arrival, Curtis finds that the site resembles a military post, with armed guards and a 10,000-volt electric fence. Lee herself bars him from entering.

An agent from "Internal Security" has been tailing Curtis. However, he must phone his superior for permission to give Curtis a full situation report. He enters a phone box to place the call, then stumbles out, covered with red spots, and falls dying to the ground. A crowd gathers. A doctor steps forward, but after touching the agent, he too dies. Then, each member of the crowd succumbs. The press dubs this unknown disease "The Crimson Plague". Although no cause or cure is discovered, the authorities develop a secret method of safely disposing of the victims' bodies.

After watching a night-time rocket launch from the site, Curtis decides to prevent another launch. A crack shot, he returns the next day with a sniper rifle and destroys the generator that supplies power to the camp, thus stopping the second launch. He climbs over the now-deactivated electric fence into the site.

After entering the aliens' headquarters, Curtis, who is also an expert in unarmed combat, wins a fight with one of them. At an underground complex, he discovers the frozen bodies of the plague victims. He is then captured and locked in a cell. Curtis escapes by hiding behind his cell door and jumping the alien who comes to kill him. Curtis then rescues an unwilling Lee, knocking her out with a punch and carrying her off.

He takes her to the home of his friend Farge. Curtis realises that the silver plate in his head somehow prevents the aliens from possessing him. He convinces Farge to melt his silver cricket trophies and fashions a colander-like protective helmet for him.

Farge uses ultraviolet light to exorcise Lee's alien. Later, she remembers nothing from her time under alien control. However, she can pretend to still be an alien and drives to the site with Curtis and Farge hiding in the back of her car. Lee, too, is protected by a silver helmet.

The three conceal themselves in a rocket just before it blasts off. But they are soon discovered and brought before the Master of the Moon, who says the government's plan to dispose of the plague victims' bodies is to shoot them to the Moon.

The aliens are creatures of pure energy and are using the humans to repair their spaceship, which had crashed on the Moon. They want to return to their home planet to die, as they have grown old and tired after light years of travel. The frozen bodies Curtis found are not really dead. The Master assures them that once the spaceship is repaired, all the "victims" will be returned to normality.

Nonetheless, the aliens prepare to surgically remove Curtis's silver plate to tap his knowledge. Farge leads the workers in a revolt and saves Curtis.

Curtis tells the Master that they need not have attempted to conquer the Earth – all they had to do was ask for help, and it would have been given. The Master's eyes well up with tears at the revelation.

== Cast ==
- Robert Hutton as Dr. Curtis Temple
- Jennifer Jayne as Lee Mason
- Zia Mohyeddin as Farge
- Bernard Kay as Richard Arden
- Michael Gough as Master of the Moon (Arnold Grey)
- Geoffrey Wallace as Alan Mullane
- Maurice Good as Agent Stillwell
- Luanshya Greer as female petrol station attendant
- John Harvey as Bill Trethowan
- Diana King as Mrs. Trethowan
- Paul Bacon as Dr. Rogers
- Christopher Banks as doctor on street
- Dermot Cathie as Peterson
- Norman Claridge as Dr. Frederick Andrews
- James Donnelly as farm gate guard
- Frank Forsyth as Mr. Blake
- Leonard Grahame as McCabe
- Michael Hawkins as Williams
- Jack Lambert as doctor in office
- Robin Parkinson as Dr. Maitland
- Edward Rees as bank manager
- Katy Wild as girl in street
- Kenneth Kendall as TV commentator (credited as Kenneth Kandall)

== Production ==
They Came from Beyond Space was made by Amicus Productions at Twickenham Studios. Much of the exterior action was filmed on Cookham High Street, in Cookham, Berkshire, UK.

The film was granted an A-Certificate by the British Board of Film Censors on 30 March 1967. The A-Cert signified that the film was "more suitable" for adult audiences. However, in order to receive the A-Cert, the movie had to be cut from its original running time of about 85 minutes to approximately 83 minutes. Details of the required cuts are not known.

The film's running time in the U.S. is the full 85 minutes. It carries no rating as it was released before the MPAA film ratings system went into effect on 1 November 1968.

== Distribution ==
They Came from Beyond Space was distributed to theatres in the U.S. by Embassy Pictures during "Summer 1967" although neither BoxOffice nor Variety reviewed the film until October of that year.

Director Freddie Francis said in an interview that the producers had spent all their budget on The Terrornauts so there was no money left over for They Came from Beyond Space. The double feature failed at the box office and has been described as the "two worst films the company ever produced".

== Home media ==
StudioCanal released a video of the film in the UK in 2012 with a PG rating from the BBFC. The rating means that the video is acceptable "for general viewing but some scenes may be unsuitable for young children". Its running time is approximately 82 minutes, about a minute shorter than the UK theatrical release.

VNF released a DVD of They Came from Beyond Space in the U.S. in January 2017.

== Reception ==
BoxOffice magazine's standing feature "Review Digest" in the 6 May 1968 edition provides ratings that fall on the lower end of the scale. Only three of the usual seven publications that BoxOffice tracks reviewed the film, with BoxOffice itself rating the film as "good"; Variety as "poor"; and the New York Daily News as "very poor". The anonymous BoxOffice reviewer in the 23 October 1967 issue calls the film "a science-fiction programmer made-to-order for the kiddies and action-minded males". The generally positive review points out that its "ingenious sets" and "fine colour photography by Norman Warwick rate special mention". The review also notes that "the attractive Jennifer Jayne and that fine young character actor Zia Moyheddin stand out in the capable cast".

The Monthly Film Bulletin wrote: "Despite some pleasant country locations and elaborate science fiction sets, this mechanically acted saga fails to ignite a single spark of interest or to obtain even a momentary suspension of disbelief."

Variety's review, written by the pseudonymous "Robe" for the issue of 11 October 1967, is more negative. It says that the film is a "tired tale" with such "abysmal colour photography" that it "might as well as have been made in black and white". It also mentions that "What is disappointing in this particular effort, as much as its obvious plot, is the lack of special effects of any importance". But it singles out the main actors as "being very good within the confines of their limited parts".

British critic Phil Hardy also dislikes They Came from Beyond Space, calling it an "inferior piece of Science Fiction". However, he points out in his brief review that "The leaden script and erratic directing notwithstanding, the film is of interest for its optimistic ending".

British academic film historian Steve Chibnall in the book British Science Fiction Cinema notes that the movie is "fuelled by the same paranoia as the American Invasion of the Body Snatchers [1956], but in turning its fifties pessimism into simplistic sixties optimism it manages to squander any claims to cultural relevance". He calls the script "tired" and notes that "with more imagination and wit" it "might have been salvaged as an episode of The Avengers."

David Elroy Goldwater, an American critic, writes that the film has a "lack of imperative, a lack of purpose. The stakes are low. It's unoriginal and unimaginative, with the same old emotionless robotic aliens we have seen 100 times". Goldwater also notes that the silver helmet worn by Farge to protect himself from alien possession is "unconsciously campy" and looks "obviously like a spaghetti strainer".

The Radio Times Guide to Films gave the film 2/5 stars, writing: "This is a pallid attempt by Hammer rivals Amicus to rehash some of the thematic lines from the Quatermass series."
