= Dark Terrors 2: The Gollancz Book of Horror =

Dark Terrors 2: The Gollancz Book of Horror is a 1996 novel written by Stephen Jones and David Sutton.

== Plot summary ==
Dark Terrors 2: The Gollancz Book of Horror is a novel in which an anthology showcases the contemporary horror scene, featuring stories that lean into psychological themes, including Peter Straub's "Hunger," and contributions by Paul J. McAuley, Clive Barker, Graham Masterton, Ramsey Campbell, and Jay Russell which offer a mix of satire, fantasy, and unsettling imagery.

== Reception ==
Gideon Kibblewhite reviewed Dark Terrors 2: The Gollancz Book of Horror for Arcane magazine, rating it an 8 out of 10 overall, and stated that "Because of its largely psychological nature, Dark Terrors 2 may not prove that useful for referees, and being a hardback, it is also considerably more expensive than Best New Horror, but it still comes highly recommended."

== Reviews ==
- Review by Peter Crowther (1997) in Interzone, February 1997
- Review by Mario Guslandi (1997) in All Hallows, February 1997
- Review by Colin Steele (2001) in SF Commentary, #77
