= The House That Dripped Blood =

1971 British film by Peter Duffell

- Original theatrical release poster
- Directed by: Peter Duffell
- Written by: Robert Bloch; Russ Jones
- Produced by: Milton Subotsky; Max Rosenberg
- Starring: Christopher Lee; Peter Cushing; Denholm Elliott; Ingrid Pitt; Nyree Dawn Porter; Jon Pertwee
- Cinematography: Ray Parslow
- Edited by: Peter Tanner
- Music by: Michael Dress
- Production company: Amicus Productions
- Distributed by: Cinerama Releasing Corporation
- Release dates: 21 February 1971 (UK); 2 April 1971 (USA)
- Running time: 102 minutes
- Country: United Kingdom
- Language: English
- Budget: £208,330
- Box office: $1 million

The House That Dripped Blood is a 1971 British anthology horror film directed by Peter Duffell and made by Amicus Productions. It stars Christopher Lee, Peter Cushing, Nyree Dawn Porter, Denholm Elliott, and Jon Pertwee. The film is a collection of four short stories concerning a series of inhabitants of the eponymous building. All of the stories were originally written, and subsequently scripted, by Robert Bloch.

== Plot ==
Framework part 1

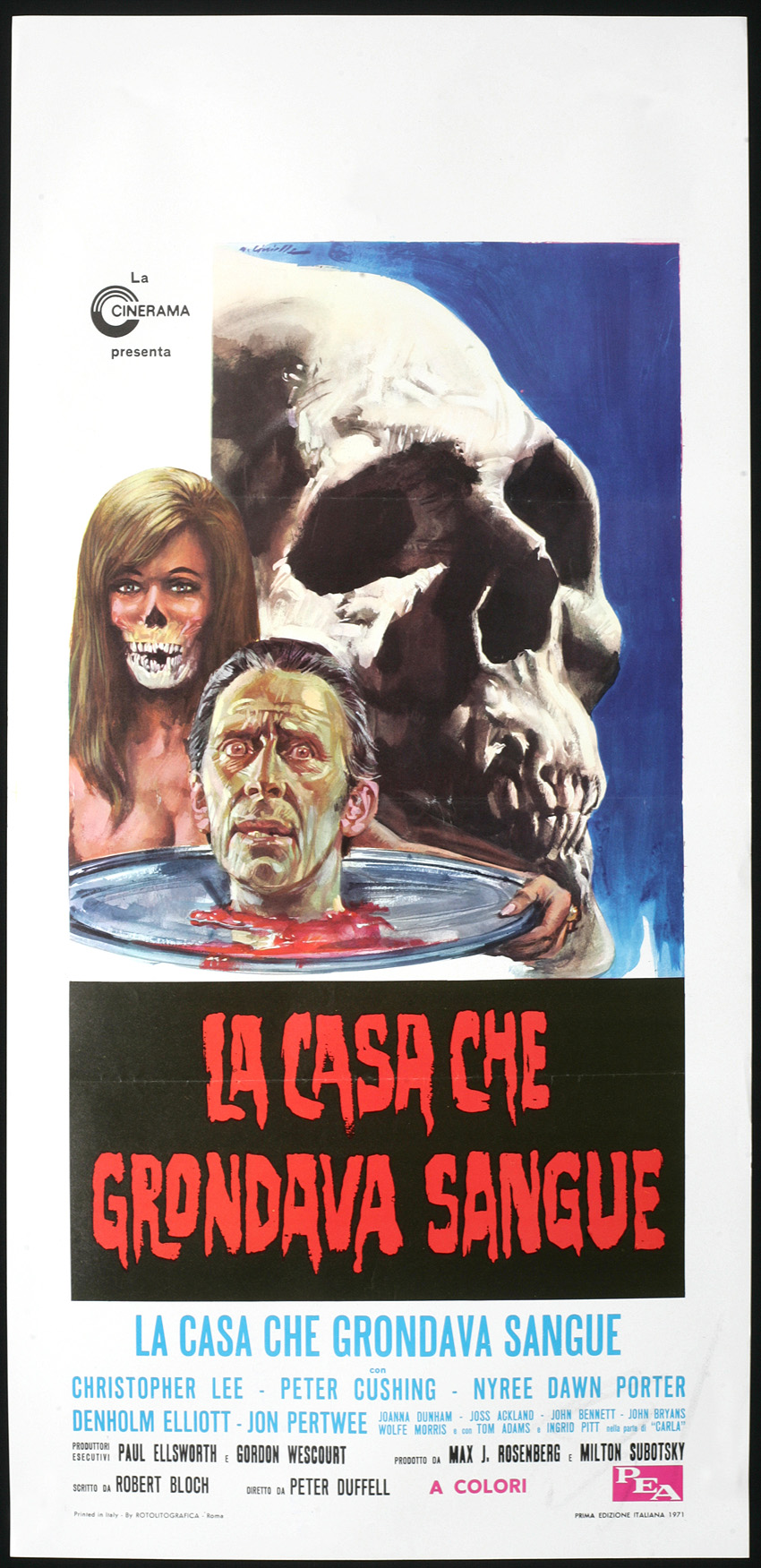
Poster for Italian version

Shortly after renting an old country house, film star Paul Henderson mysteriously disappears and Inspector Holloway from Scotland Yard is called to investigate. Inquiring at the local police station, Holloway is told some of the house's history.

Method for Murder (Fury No. 7, July 1962)

Charles Hillyer, a hack writer who specialises in horror stories, and his wife Alice, move into the house. Charles begins working on a novel focusing on Dominic, a murderous, psychopathic strangler; Charles becomes simultaneously enamoured and disturbed by the character. Charles soon starts to see Dominic, who begins stalking and tormenting him.

Charles begins seeing a psychologist, Dr. Andrews, who suggests Dominic is the other half of a split personality formed by Charles getting into Dominic's mindset to write the novel. Charles's visions of Dominic become even more pronounced. He sees Dominic strangling Alice, only for her to claim that Charles had been strangling her. At another session with Dr. Andrews, Andrews suggests Dominic is the result of darker sides of Charles's personality being released by writing the novel, though Charles is sceptical as he has written horror stories for years and never had a problem. Suddenly, Dominic arrives and strangles Dr. Andrews while Charles lies back in a chair with his eyes closed. When the doctor stops responding, Charles opens his eyes, and, jumping to his feet, backs away, screaming in horror as Dominic laughs.

At the house Dominic approaches Alice, only to reveal that he is actually Richard, her lover. Richard, an actor, had been pretending to be Dominic to drive Charles insane, so that Alice and Richard could take the money made from his novels and run off together. Alice gets a call from the police, and learns that both Dr. Andrews and Charles had been strangled to death. Alice asks Richard why he had killed them, as it was not part of the plan, only for Richard to reveal he now believes he is Dominic. Richard/Dominic then strangles Alice while laughing maniacally.

Framework part 2

Sergeant Martin informs Holloway that Richard/Dominic was later found standing over Alice's body, laughing. He says he believes that it was not merely a case of Richard/Dominic being driven to madness by the role, but some effect of the house itself. Holloway dismisses this as absurd, so Martin tells him another story, of the next tenant to inhabit the house.

Waxworks (Weird Tales Vol. 33 No. 1, January 1939)

Retired stockbroker Philip Grayson moves into the house. Though initially he occupies himself with his hobbies, he quickly becomes lonely. One day, while wandering around town, he happens upon a wax museum. Grayson explores the museum and finds a sculpture of Salome which resembles a dead woman he had been in love with. The museum's proprietor explains that he based the likeness of the sculpture after his late wife, who had been executed after murdering his best friend. Disturbed, Grayson vows never to return.

His friend Neville Rogers arrives at his home while travelling on business. Grayson eagerly invites him to stay the night, and it becomes clear the two had both been romantic rivals for the same woman; however, the two had reconciled after her death. The next day, Grayson takes Neville around town, and the two spot the wax museum. Though Grayson tries to persuade him not to, Neville enters the wax museum and spots the sculpture, becoming obsessed with it. Neville tries to leave town, but is unable to abandon the sculpture. Staying at a local motel, he calls Grayson and informs him of his predicament. When Grayson arrives, he finds Neville has left for the wax museum. Grayson goes to the museum, and finds Neville's severed head has been added to an exhibit. The proprietor arrives and reveals he had framed his wife for his friend's murder, so that he could cover her corpse in wax and keep her to himself forever. However, men continue to become enamoured with her, and some, like Neville, become obsessed, which puts him into a murderous rage. The proprietor then murders Grayson with an axe, and adds his head to the Salome exhibition.

Framework part 3

Holloway asks if Henderson moved in next, and is told that there was one other tenant before him. However, Holloway does not stay around to hear this story, believing the whole thing preposterous, and instead decides to confer with the estate agent, A.J. Stoker. Stoker tells Holloway that he "tried to warn them" of the house's "secret", and asks Holloway if he has "guessed it yet". Holloway ignores this, dismissing this too as absurd, and instead asks him what happened to the tenant before Henderson. Stoker explains.

Sweets to the Sweet (Weird Tales Vol. 39 No. 10, March 1947)

Widower John Reid moves into the house along with his pyrophobic young daughter Jane. John hires former teacher Ann Norton to tutor Jane. Ann gradually bonds with Jane, and she helps Jane get over her fear of fire and teaches her how to read, but begins to suspect John is abusive: he does not allow her to play with other children or own toys, and does his best to keep her isolated.

Norton confronts John about his parenting, and asks if he blames Jane for the death of his wife, to which John responds that he is glad his wife is dead. Norton manages to get John to allow her to buy Jane some toys; when John discovers a doll amongst the toys bought, he snatches it from Jane and tosses it in the fire. Jane begins to secretly read books about witchcraft. One night, during a blackout, John discovers some of the candles are missing. John angrily questions Jane about this and slaps her, to Ann's horror. Jane secretly uses the missing candles to form a wax voodoo doll, which she uses to leave John bedridden.

He reveals to Ann that Jane's mother was a witch, and that Jane is as well; the reason for his parenting methods were to stop Jane from harming anybody. When Jane begins to attack John via the doll once again, he instructs Ann to find the doll and take it from Jane to stop her from killing him. Ann finds Jane standing next to the burning fireplace holding the doll; Ann tries to convince her to give her the doll, but Jane tosses the doll into the fire. Ann listens in horror as John burns to death and Jane smiles evilly.

Framework part 4

Holloway dismisses this story as the most ridiculous so far, and demands the estate agent tells him about Henderson. Stoker clarifies that he warned Henderson not take it, not believing it would be "right for his personality", but states that he gave in once Henderson insisted. He then tells his final story.

The Cloak (Unknown May 1939)

Temperamental veteran horror film actor Paul Henderson moves into the house while starring in a vampire film being shot nearby. Henderson, a great fan of the horror genre, is angry over the lack of realism in the film, particularly over the cloak worn by his character (who happens to be a vampire). He decides to purchase a more accurate cloak, and to that end stops at an antique shop run by the enigmatic Theo von Hartmann. Von Hartmann offers him a black cloak after listening to Henderson's demands, and Henderson purchases it. Before he leaves, von Hartmann tells him to use the cloak for its intended purpose.

While in his makeup room, Henderson finds that when he wears the cloak, he has no reflection. Later that day, while shooting a scene where he sucks the blood from his costar and girlfriend Carla, Paul begins genuinely trying to suck her blood even after the scene ends. A horrified Carla demands he stay away from her. At midnight, the witching hour, Paul puts on the cloak again as a test. He grows fangs and begins to fly, much to his horror.

Paul reads in the newspaper that von Hartmann's shop has burned down and von Hartmann's corpse has been found inside; the corpse was identified as being several hundred years old. Paul realises that von Hartmann was a vampire, and that he gave Henderson the cloak so that he could pass his powers on to Henderson, allowing him to die. Henderson apologizes to Carla and invites her over to his home; he explains to her his predicament, but she is skeptical and demands he prove it by putting on the cloak. Henderson is reluctant, as it is midnight, but he ultimately complies. Paul is relieved to find that nothing happens, but he quickly realises that the cloak had been substituted with a prop. Carla dons the cloak and reveals she is actually a vampire sent to turn Henderson into another vampire, as most vampires admire his portrayal of their kind. Carla flies towards a screaming Henderson and begins to turn him into a vampire.

Framework part 5

Holloway refuses to believe Stoker and goes to the house, despite it being nearly midnight and the house having no electricity. He explores the house by candlelight, eventually breaking into a locked basement where he finds and kills Henderson, now a fully transformed vampire. He is himself then killed by Carla.

The next morning, Stoker walks up to the house and breaks the fourth wall by talking to the audience – asking if they understand the secret of the house: that it reflects the personality of whoever is living in it and treats them accordingly. He muses that perhaps the audience would be suitable, and "that there is nothing to be afraid of, provided [they're] the right sort of person".

== Cast (by segment) ==
=== "Framework" ===
- John Bennett as Detective Inspector Holloway
- John Bryans as A.J. Stoker
- John Malcolm as Sergeant Martin

=== "Method For Murder" ===
- Denholm Elliott as Charles Hillyer
- Joanna Dunham as Alice Hillyer
- Tom Adams as Richard/Dominic
- Robert Lang as Dr. Andrews

=== "Waxworks" ===
- Peter Cushing as Philip Grayson
- Joss Ackland as Neville Rogers
- Wolfe Morris as Waxworks Proprietor

=== "Sweets to the Sweet" ===
- Christopher Lee as John Reid
- Nyree Dawn Porter as Ann Norton
- Chloe Franks as Jane Reid
- Hugh Manning as Mark
- Carleton Hobbs as Dr. Bailey

=== "The Cloak" ===
- Jon Pertwee as Paul Henderson
- Ingrid Pitt as Carla Lynde
- Geoffrey Bayldon as Theo von Hartmann
- Jonathan Lynn as Mr. Petrich

== Production ==
Freddie Francis was sought for the director's chair but he had prior commitments to a film in Hollywood, which ultimately fell through.

Originally, director Peter Duffell wanted to have the title Death and the Maiden as he used Franz Schubert's composition of the same title in the film. Producer Milton Subotsky insisted on The House That Dripped Blood, telling Duffell "We're in the marketplace, we have to use that title". Not one drop of blood appears in the actual film.

When Peter Duffell was engaged the participation of actors Lee, Cushing and Pitt had already been decided by the producers. All other actors were cast by Duffell.

Jon Pertwee later wrote in his memoir that the film was meant to be a comedy-horror film and was initially filmed in that way. According to Pertwee, during the production "the producer came in, took one look at what we are doing and went raving mad", insisting it was to be a horror film and not a comedy. This meant a change of tone, but the material which had already been filmed remained, resulting in the film dipping in quality and edits to remove comedy elements from Pertwee's sequences. Pertwee also admitted that he intentionally based his character, the horror actor Paul Henderson, on his co-star and friend Christopher Lee. During the production Lee realised that Pertwee was basing his performance on an actor, but did not know it was based on him. In a scene in which Henderson talks about favourite roles, he says that he prefers Bela Lugosi's Dracula rather than the chap who plays him nowadays (meaning Lee in several Hammer Films).

== Release ==
=== Critical reception ===
Roger Greenspun of The New York Times wrote in a mixed review that he was "of several minds" about the film, calling the first two stories "as dull in development as they are in idea. But the latter two stories, though necessarily too short and too schematic, generate some interest, and humor, and even a bit of characterization." Variety called it "one of the most entertaining of its genre to come along in several years and should prove strong opposition to the general monopoly of that market by Hammer Films ... even for filmgoers who don't usually follow the shocker market, this one is worthwhile." Kevin Thomas of The Los Angeles Times wrote, "Richly atmospheric settings, muted color photography, an outstanding cast and competent direction (by Peter Duffell) do justice to Bloch's fine script, which deals with psychological terror rather than relying on the typical blood-and-guts formula." Tom Milne of The Monthly Film Bulletin called the first two stories "enjoyable enough in a rough-and-ready way" and the fourth story "a pleasant joke which would have been much funnier had it been played by a genuine horror star such as Vincent Price," but singled out the third story as "in an altogether different league ... it is mainly a mood piece which brilliantly orchestrates the child's loneliness, the father's hapless cruelty, and the governess' well-meaning failure to understand, into a haunting picture of the evil that can come of good intentions."

Among more recent reviews, AllMovie's review of the film was mostly positive, calling it "a solid example of the Amicus horror anthology." Halliwell's Film Guide described the film as "neatly made and generally pleasing despite a low level of originality in the writing."

=== Box office ===
The film was a minor success in the UK but did very well in the US.

=== Home media ===
Format	Audio	Subtitles	Region	Aspect Ratio	Studio	Release date
DVD-Video, PAL	English: Dolby Digital 2.0 Dual Mono, Dolby Digital 5.1 Surround, DTS 5.1 Surround	none	Region 2	1.85:1	Anchor Bay Entertainment	27 October 2003
DVD-Video, NTSC	English: Dolby Digital 2.0 Dual Mono	English, Spanish	Region 1	1.85:1	Lions Gate Home Entertainment	28 October 2003
DVD-Video, NTSC	English: Dolby Digital 2.0 Dual Mono	English	Region 1	1.85:1	Hen's Tooth Video	26 February 2013
Blu-Ray, 1080p	English: DTS-HD Master Audio 2.0 Mono	English	Region A	1.85:1	Shout! Factory (Scream Factory)	8 March 2018

== Sources ==
- Bryce, Allen (2000), Amicus: The Studio That Dripped Blood, Stray Cat Publishing Ltd, ISBN 978-0953326136
- Callaghan, Caroline (16 February 2009), Peter Duffell and the House That Dripped Blood, The British Fantasy Society
- Guarisco, Donald, The House That Dripped Blood (1971), Allmovie
- Greenspun, Roger (22 April 1971), "Screen: Horror Tales", The New York Times: 37
- Hallenbeck, Bruce G. (2015), The Amicus Anthology, Midnight Marquee Press, ISBN 978-1936168569
- Halliwell, Leslie (1981), Halliwell's Film Guide, University of Michigan, ISBN 9780246115331
- Milne, Tom (March 1971), "The House That Dripped Blood", The Monthly Film Bulletin, 38 (446): 50
- Robe (3 March 1971), "The House That Dripped Blood", Variety: 17
- Thomas, Kevin (23 April 1971), "'House That Dripped Blood' Opens", Los Angeles Times: Part IV, p12
