= Milton Subotsky =

American film and television producer and writer

- Born: September 27, 1921; New York City, New York, U.S.
- Died: June 27, 1991 (aged 69); London, England
- Occupations: Film and television producer and writer
- Years active: 1950–1991
- Organization: Amicus Productions (co-founded with Max Rosenberg)
- Spouse: Fiona Subotsky

Milton Subotsky (September 27, 1921 – June 27, 1991) was an American producer and writer of film and television. He was the co-founder of Amicus Productions with Max J. Rosenberg, which produced horror and science-fiction films in the United Kingdom during the 1960's and 70's.

== Early life and career ==
Subotsky was born in New York City, to a family of Jewish immigrants. During World War II, he served in the Signal Corps, in which he wrote and edited technical training films. After the war, he began a career as a writer and producer during the 1950s "Golden Age" of television, including the television series The Clock and Lights Out.

In 1954, he wrote and produced the TV series Junior Science. He graduated to film producing Rock, Rock, Rock (1956), for which he also composed nine songs. Subotsky moved to England; he produced his first horror film, The City of the Dead (a.k.a. Horror Hotel, 1960), at Shepperton Studios. He was a regular juror on Juke Box Jury on BBC Television in the early 1960s.

== Amicus Productions ==
In 1964, with fellow expatriate producer Max J. Rosenberg, Subotsky formed the company Amicus Productions. Amicus means "friend" in Latin. Based at Shepperton Studios, they produced such films as Dr. Terror's House of Horrors (1964), Dr. Who and the Daleks (1965), Daleks' Invasion Earth 2150 A.D. (1966), Torture Garden (1967), Scream and Scream Again (1970), The House That Dripped Blood (1970), Tales from The Crypt (1972), Asylum (1972), From Beyond the Grave (1973) and The Land That Time Forgot (1974).

== Sword & Sorcery Productions ==
Amicus was disestablished in 1975, but Subotsky continued producing. Around this time he formed Sword & Sorcery Productions, Ltd., with Frank Duggan. At some point Andrew Donally joined the company. Numerous projects did not enter production. These include adaptations of Lin Carter's Thongor stories, a live-action version of Stan Lee's The Incredible Hulk, film adaptations of stories that appeared in James Warren's comic magazines Creepy and Eerie, and a co-production with former James Bond film producer Harry Saltzman on Saltzman's troubled "shrunken man" epic The Micronauts.

Unable to purchase film rights to Robert E. Howard's Conan the Barbarian stories, Subotsky instead bought the rights to Carter's "Thongor" stories in 1976. Subotsky himself adapted Carter's 1965 novel The Wizard of Lemuria. United Artists agreed to bankroll the project – now called Thongor in the Valley of Demons – in 1978, but subsequently withdrew for unspecified reasons.

Sword & Sorcery's first film project to get off the ground was Dominique. In 1980, they co-produced the TV series The Martian Chronicles, adapted from the short story collection by Ray Bradbury. During the making of this miniseries, Subotsky and Donally parted ways.

== Later career and death ==
In 1984, after failing to finance King Crab (a horror film based on Guy N. Smith's Night of the Crabs), Milton Subtosky (who produced the 1960s Dalek films) adapted the screenplay into a Doctor Who film with two Doctors. Subtosky envisioned Jon Pertwee or Tom Baker as the older Doctor, and a new actor as the younger one. The film's working title was The Lossiemouth Affair, and it became Dr Who's Greatest Adventure. Subotsky pursued production of the film until his death in 1991.

Subotsky also co-produced several adaptations of Stephen King novels, including Cat's Eye (1985), Maximum Overdrive (1986), Sometimes They Come Back (a 1991 TV film) and The Lawnmower Man (1992). The Director's Cut of the latter was dedicated to his memory.

Subotsky died of heart disease in 1991, at the age of 69. His widow, Dr Fiona Subotsky, is a prominent London psychiatrist, and an historian of psychiatry.

== Filmography ==
- Close (Series) 1954
- Junior Science (Series) 1956
- Rock! Rock! Rock! 1957
- Jamboree! 1959
- City of the Dead 1960
- The Last Mile 1960
- It's Trad, Dad! 1962
- Ring A Ding Rhythm 1963
- Just for Fun 1963
- Dr. Terror's House of Horrors 1965
- Dr. Who and the Daleks 1965
- The Skull 1965
- The World of Abbott and Costello 1965
- The Psychopath 1966
- The Deadly Bees 1966
- Daleks' Invasion Earth 2150 A.D. 1966
- The Terrornauts 1967
- They Came from Beyond Space 1967
- Torture Garden 1967
- Danger Route 1967
- The Birthday Party 1968
- A Touch of Love 1969
- Scream and Scream Again 1970
- The Mind of Mr. Soames 1970
- The House That Dripped Blood 1971
- I, Monster 1971
- Tales from the Crypt 1972
- What Became of Jack and Jill? 1972
- Asylum 1972
- The Vault of Horror 1973
- And Now the Screaming Starts! 1973
- From Beyond the Grave 1974
- The Beast Must Die 1974
- Madhouse 1974
- The Land That Time Forgot 1974
- At the Earth's Core 1976
- The People That Time Forgot 1977
- The Uncanny 1977
- Dominique 1979
- The Martian Chronicles 1981 Mini Series
- The Monster Club 1981
- Cat's Eye 1985
- Maximum Overdrive 1986
- Sometimes They Come Back 1991
- The Lawnmower Man 1992
- Sometimes They Come Back... Again 1996
