= It's Trad, Dad! =

1962 British film by Richard Lester

- Australian film poster
- Directed by: Richard Lester
- Written by: Milton Subotsky
- Produced by: Max Rosenberg; Milton Subotsky
- Starring: Helen Shapiro; Craig Douglas; Felix Felton; Deryck Guyler
- Cinematography: Gilbert Taylor
- Edited by: Bill Lenny
- Music by: Ken Thorne (incidental music)
- Production company: Amicus Productions
- Distributed by: Columbia Pictures
- Release date: 30 March 1962
- Running time: 78 minutes
- Country: United Kingdom
- Language: English
- Budget: £50,000
- Box office: £300,000 (UK)

It's Trad, Dad! (U.S. title: Ring-A-Ding Rhythm) is a 1962 British musical comedy film directed by Richard Lester in his feature directorial debut. It stars singer and actress Helen Shapiro alongside Craig Douglas, John Leyton, the Brook Brothers, and Chubby Checker, among other rock-and-roll singers, as well as several Dixieland jazz bands. The film was one of the first produced by Amicus Productions, a company known predominantly for horror films.

== Plot ==
Craig and Helen are teenagers who enjoy the latest trend of traditional jazz along with their friends. The local mayor and a group of adults dislike the trend and move to have the jukebox in the coffee shop silenced.

With the help of an omniscient narrator, Craig and Helen try to find a disc jockey and organize a show to popularize the music. Their travels take them where the music is: nightclubs, TV studios, and recording companies. They eventually get to see disc jockey Pete Murray and persuade him to attend and arrange for several jazz bands to perform. Murray recruits two other deejays, David Jacobs and Alan Freeman, to join the party. The mayor, upon hearing the news of the upcoming performance, decides to stop the performers' bus by any means necessary.

When the show is scheduled to start, Craig and Helen find that their disc jockey and musicians have not yet arrived, so they perform themselves and are well received by the crowd. The bands' bus manages to evade a series of obstacles set up by the local police, and they arrive and put on the show for the BBC television cameras. The film ends with everyone enjoying the music, including the mayor who has been easily persuaded to take the credit for having arranged a successful show.

== Cast ==
- Helen Shapiro
- Craig Douglas
- John Leyton
- The Brook Brothers
- Chubby Checker
- Del Shannon
- Gary U.S. Bonds (as Gary (U.S.) Bonds)
- Gene Vincent
- Gene McDaniels
- The Paris Sisters (as Paris Sisters)
- The Dukes of Dixieland (as Dukes of Dixieland)
- Chris Barber's Jazz Band with Ottilie Patterson
- Acker Bilk and His Paramount Jazz Band (as Mr. Acker Bilk and His Paramount Jazz Band)
- Kenny Ball and his Jazzmen (as Kenny Ball's Jazzmen)
- Bob Wallis and his Storyville Jazzmen
- Terry Lightfoot and his New Orleans Jazz Band
- The Temperance Seven
- Sounds Incorporated (as Sounds Inc.)
- David Jacobs
- Pete Murray
- Alan Freeman
- Felix Felton as Mayor
- Arthur Mullard as Police Chief
- Deryck Guyler as Narrator

== Soundtrack ==
The film predominantly comprises musical numbers, including performances by the principal actors Helen Shapiro and Craig Douglas themselves. However, unlike traditional "musicals" the songs have little to do with the movie plot. The other performers shown in the cast list were popular acts from both the U.K. and U.S.

Numbers performed in the film
Number	Artist(s)
"Tavern in the Town"	Terry Lightfoot and His New Orleans Jazz Band
"1919 March"	Kenny Ball and His Jazzmen
"Space Ship to Mars"	Gene Vincent
"Double Trouble"	The Brook Brothers
"Dream Away Romance"	The Temperance Seven
"Everybody Loves My Baby"	The Temperance Seven
"Bellissima"	Bob Wallis and His Storyville Jazzmen
"Seven Day Weekend"	Gary "U.S." Bonds
"What Am I to Do?"	The Paris Sisters
"You Never Talked About Me"	Del Shannon
"Another Tear Falls"	Gene McDaniels
"Bye and Bye"	Dukes of Dixieland
"Lose-Your-Inhibitions Twist"	Chubby Checker
"In A Persian Market"	Acker Bilk and His Paramount Jazz Band
"Lonely City"	John Leyton
"High Society"	Acker Bilk and His Paramount Jazz Band
"Frankie & Johnny"	Acker Bilk and His Paramount Jazz Band
"Aunt Flo"	Bob Wallis and His Storyville Jazzmen
"Rainbows"	Craig Douglas
"Let's Talk About Love"	Helen Shapiro
"Sometime Yesterday"	Helen Shapiro
"Maryland, My Maryland"	Terry Lightfoot and His New Orleans Jazz Band
"Beale Street Blues"	Kenny Ball and His Jazzmen
"Yellow Dog Blues"	Chris Barber's Jazz Band
"Down by the Riverside"	Chris Barber's Jazz Band featuring Ottilie Patterson
"When the Saints Go Marching In"	Chris Barber's Jazz Band featuring Ottilie Patterson
"Ring-a-Ding"	Craig Douglas

== Reception ==
The Monthly Film Bulletin wrote: "No one takes this most bewhiskered of stories seriously for a moment, least of all the director, Dick Lester. He has worked with The Goons, both in TV (A Show Called Fred) and films (The Running, Jumping and Standing Still Film), and here revives the tradition of W. C. Fields, Eddie Cline and Hellzapoppin by satirising his script, his actors and any number of cinema conventions between the feverish jazz turns which make up the bulk of the picture. These jazz insets are dashing, deafening or sociologically depressing according to one's personal reaction, with Helen Shapiro's assurance (as a singer, though not yet as an actress) and the Temperance Seven's devastatingly funny impassivity making notably strong impressions. For once it is sheer zest and invention which count, for they are the qualities – far more than the jamboree of topline "pop" artists taking part – which have succeeded in turning a basically threadbare, trashy plot-line into a genuinely comic occasion."
