= Just for Fun (film) =

1963 British film by Gordon Flemyng

- Original lobby card of Bobby Vee
- Directed by: Gordon Flemyng
- Written by: Milton Subotsky
- Produced by: Max Rosenberg; Milton Subotsky
- Starring: Mark Wynter; Cherry Roland; Alan Caddy; Bobby Vee
- Cinematography: Nicolas Roeg
- Edited by: Raymond Poulton
- Music by: Tony Hatch
- Production company: Amicus Productions
- Distributed by: Columbia Pictures
- Release date: February 1963
- Running time: 85 minutes
- Country: United Kingdom
- Language: English

Just for Fun is a 1963 British musical film directed by Gordon Flemyng and starring Mark Wynter and Cherry Roland. It was written by Amicus co-founder Milton Subotsky. Cinematography was by Nicolas Roeg.

== Plot ==
When English teenagers win the right to vote, the established political parties compete for their support. However, when the Prime Minister cuts the amount of pop music allowed on TV, young Mark and Cherry start their own "Teenage Party" and use some of England's pop singers to help.

== Cast ==
- Mark Wynter as Mark
- Cherry Roland as Cherry
- Richard Vernon as Prime minister
- Reginald Beckwith as Opposition leader
- John Wood as Official
- Jeremy Lloyd as Prime minister's son
- Harry Fowler as interviewer
- Edwin Richfield as man with a CND badge
- Alan Freeman as narrator
- David Jacobs as disc jockey
- Jimmy Savile as disc jockey
- Irene Handl as housewife
- Hugh Lloyd as plumber
- Dick Emery
- Mario Fabrizi
- Ken Parry
- Gary Hope
- Douglas Ives
- Ian Gray
- John Martin
- Jack Bentley
- Frank Williams
- Gordon Rollings
- Bobby Vee
- The Crickets
- Freddy Cannon
- Johnny Tillotson
- Ketty Lester
- Joe Brown and the Bruvvers
- Karl Denver
- Kenny Lynch
- Jet Harris
- Tony Meehan
- Clodagh Rodgers
- Louise Cordet
- Lyn Cornell
- The Tornados
- The Springfields
- The Spotnicks
- Jimmy Powell
- Brian Poole and the Tremeloes
- Sounds Incorporated
- The Vernons Girls

== Critical reception ==
The Monthly Film Bulletin wrote: "After a promising beginning, in which the two major political parties ruefully appraise their own vote-appeal, with the Right proclaiming "We Never Had It So Good" and the Left sadly echoing "I've Never Had It", the script – such as it is – gets bogged down in tiresomely juvenile antics as the Top People try to crush the budding teenage politicians. A few guest stars interrupt with their turns, allowing Dick Emery a mildly funny moment impersonating the entire panel of a "Juke Box Jury" show. For the rest, the script devotes itself faithfully to providing cues for music, of the calibre of "Hey, it's time for the Alan Freeman show" (switching on a TV set) or "Hey, look it's ..." (passing a convenient TV studio). The numbers themselves, all twenty-eight of them, follow the TV variety show formula, and are unimaginatively presented in cramped settings. Some of the singers – Joe Brown, Cloda Rogers and Kenny Lynch in particular – reveal pleasing personalities; but the film is strictly for incurable addicts."

TCM wrote, "episodic in the extreme, Just for Fun plays like an evening of Vaudeville, with the various singing acts punctuated by broad comic bits that are more miss than hit but retain, at least at this distance, an undeniable vintage charm ... sweet relief comes in the form of the assembled musical talent, whose contributions are well-staged by director Gordon Flemyng."
