= The Skull (film) =

1965 British film by Freddie Francis

- Theatrical release poster
- Directed by: Freddie Francis
- Written by: Milton Subotsky
- Based on: "The Skull of the Marquis de Sade" by Robert Bloch
- Produced by: Max Rosenberg; Milton Subotsky
- Starring: Peter Cushing; Christopher Lee; Jill Bennett; Patrick Wymark; Nigel Green
- Cinematography: John Wilcox
- Edited by: Oswald Hafenrichter
- Music by: Elisabeth Lutyens
- Production company: Amicus Productions
- Distributed by: Paramount Pictures
- Release date: 25 August 1965
- Running time: 83 minutes
- Country: United Kingdom
- Language: English

The Skull is a 1965 British horror film directed by Freddie Francis for Amicus Productions, and starring Peter Cushing and Christopher Lee, Patrick Wymark, Jill Bennett, Nigel Green, Patrick Magee and Peter Woodthorpe. The script was written by Milton Subotsky from a short story by Robert Bloch, "The Skull of the Marquis de Sade".

It was one of a number of British horror films of the sixties to be scored by avant-garde composer Elisabeth Lutyens, including several others for Amicus.

== Plot ==
In the 19th century, Pierre, a phrenologist, robs the grave of the recently buried Marquis de Sade. He takes the Marquis's severed head and sets about boiling it to remove its flesh, leaving the skull. Before the task is done, Pierre meets an unseen and horrific death.

In modern-day London, Christopher Maitland, a collector and writer on the occult, is offered the skull by Anthony Marco, an unscrupulous dealer in antiques and curiosities. Maitland learns that the skull has been stolen from Sir Matthew Phillips, a friend and fellow collector. Sir Matthew, however, does not want to recover it, having escaped its evil influence. He warns Maitland of its powers. At his sleazy lodgings, Marco dies in mysterious circumstances. Maitland finds his body and takes possession of the skull. He in turn falls victim as the skull drives him to hallucinations, madness and death.

== Cast ==
- Peter Cushing as Dr. Christopher Maitland
- Patrick Wymark as Anthony Marco
- Christopher Lee as Sir Matthew Phillips
- Jill Bennett as Jane Maitland
- Nigel Green as Inspector Wilson
- Patrick Magee as Police Surgeon
- Peter Woodthorpe as Bert Travers
- Michael Gough as auctioneer
- George Coulouris as Dr. Londe
- April Olrich as French Girl
- Maurice Good as Pierre
- Anna Palk as Maid

== Production ==
The film was an attempt by Amicus to challenge Hammer Film Productions by making a full length colour movie. Once filming started, Freddie Francis rewrote much of Milton Subotsky's script.

Christopher Lee is billed as "guest star" in the film's credits; he plays a supporting role. The film's final twenty-five minutes contain almost no dialogue.

In real life, the Marquis de Sade's body was exhumed from its grave in the grounds of the lunatic asylum at Charenton, where he died in 1814, and his skull was removed for phrenological analysis. It was subsequently lost, and its fate remains unknown.

== Release ==
When it was released in France, promotional materials had to be changed at the last minute by pasting a new title, Le crâne maléfique ("The Evil Skull"), over the original French title Les Forfaits du Marquis de Sade ("Infamies of the Marquis de Sade") on posters and lobby cards, after legal action by the present-day Sade family.

== Reception ==
The Monthly Film Bulletin wrote: "A graveyard opening, followed by the cleansing of the skull in a decor which establishes a nice line in drawing-room laboratories, promises a 19th century piece of macabre skullduggery in familiar idiom; but the opening is merely a resumé of the skull's history, and the main action takes place in contemporary decor which is unusually vivid and imaginative. The film is pictorially effective throughout, and is directed by Freddie Francis with an individual flair which far outstrips the standard gimmicks of the genre. Francis has perhaps an over-fondness for camera motion (pans, tracks and tilts galore, which tend to become irksome after a time); the trick shots, with the camera, as it were, inside the skull so that we look out through the eye-sockets, are over-used; and it is a pity that the idea was not reserved for a single presentation during the climax when the skull establishes itself on a pentacular table on which it teleports one of the statuettes. But except for one shot towards the end when, through boldness in bringing the thing into close-up, suspension wires are too clearly visible, the mobility of the skull is very well contrived; and such blemishes are small price to pay for an unusually deft piece of macabre supernatural, the impact of which is given extra distinction in Bill Constable's art direction and Elisabeth Lutyens' score."
