= Clive Barker's A-Z of Horror =

1997 TV documentary series

Clive Barker's A-Z of Horror is a six-part documentary series first broadcast on BBC2 on 4 October 1997. It was written and hosted by Clive Barker and explored the history of horror, from the cinema to art. Subjects included are the influence of the Grand Guignol, the literary works of Edgar Allan Poe and H. P. Lovecraft, the real life serial killer Ed Gein, the horror make-up effects of Tom Savini and director George A. Romero, as well as works of artist Franz Xaver Messerschmidt and the horror film icon Freddy Krueger. A tie-in book was released featuring art work by Barker and film reviews by Stephen Jones.

== Episodes ==
No.	Title	Original release date
1	"American Psycho"	4 October 1997
Barker explores the Wisconsin farmer Ed Gein, who graduated from grave-robbing to murder in the fifties. Gein's story inspired three films: Psycho, The Texas Chain Saw Massacre and The Silence of the Lambs. Directors and film stars explain how fiction fed off fact.
2	"The Devil You Know"	11 October 1997
Barker asks what made The Exorcist one of the scariest horror films ever. He also looks at the work of New England writer Shirley Jackson and the film The Haunting, based on one of her novels. Also a sculptor, who captured the face of madness, and the hyping of horror B-movies.
3	"The Kingdom of the Dead"	18 October 1997
A look at the cult classic Night of the Living Dead, made by George A. Romero and a group of friends on a shoestring budget. Plus a visit to the home of film director Roger Corman, the connection between English castles and American novelist Edgar Allan Poe and the enduring imagery of blood.
4	"Broken Homes"	25 October 1997
John Carpenter, director of Halloween, explains how that night can turn the serenity of suburban streets into a scene of fear and carnage. Plus techno-horror movies in Japan and the subversive power of evil children in horror stories.
5	"A Fate Worse Than Death"	8 November 1997
Barker explores the work of Dennis Wheatley, where the supernatural is bound up with an unmistakable Englishness. Also, the tragedy behind The Crow.
6	"Beyond Good and Evil"	3 January 1998
Barker profiles horror-actress Barbara Steele, and investigates the world of Ira Levin's 1967 novel Rosemary's Baby and Roman Polanski's 1968 film adaptation, and the links between novelist H. P. Lovecraft and a small town in New England.

== Book ==
Clive Barker's A-Z of Horror, compiled by Stephen Jones, BBC Books, 1997, ISBN 0-563-37152-8.
