= Asylum (1972 horror film) =

British film by Roy Ward Baker

- Theatrical release poster
- Directed by: Roy Ward Baker
- Written by: Robert Bloch
- Produced by: Max Rosenberg; Milton Subotsky
- Starring: Peter Cushing; Britt Ekland; Robert Powell; Herbert Lom; Barry Morse; Patrick Magee
- Cinematography: Denys N. Coop
- Edited by: Peter Tanner
- Music by: Douglas Gamley
- Production companies: Amicus Productions; Harbor Productions
- Distributed by: Cinema International Corporation
- Release date: 6 July 1972
- Running time: 88 minutes
- Country: United Kingdom
- Language: English

Asylum (U.S. title: House of Crazies) is a 1972 British anthology horror film made by Amicus Productions. The film was directed by Roy Ward Baker and produced by Milton Subotsky. Robert Bloch wrote the script, adapting four of his own short stories.

Baker had considerable experience as a director of horror films, having made Quatermass and the Pit and Scars of Dracula. Bloch had written the novel Psycho, on which the film directed by Alfred Hitchcock was based.

The film was shot in April 1972; it premièred in the UK on 6 July 1972, and in North America on 17 November 1972.

== Plot (including cast list) ==
=== Framing story ===
Dr. Martin arrives to take up a post at a secluded asylum "for the incurably insane". He has a preliminary interview with the authoritarian warden Lionel Rutherford, who says that London-trained doctors like Martin do not understand the realities of mental illness. Rutherford does not believe that his patients can be cured or improved, and contents himself with keeping them isolated from society.

Rutherford was recently attacked by Dr B. Starr, formerly head of the asylum and now one of its inmates. Starr had a mental breakdown and, after the violent episode, assumed a new personality. Rutherford challenges Martin to interview the patients on the premises and prove his acumen by detecting which one is Starr.

Rutherford is using a wheelchair while he recovers from the attack, and cannot accompany Martin upstairs. Instead an orderly, Max Reynolds, admits Martin through the security door and takes him on a tour of the inmates' solitary confinement cells. Rutherford has ordered Max not to give Martin any clues that would help identify Starr.

This story is loosely based on Bloch's short story, A Home Away from Home, first published in Alfred Hitchcock's Mystery Magazine and adapted for television on The Alfred Hitchcock Hour.

- Robert Powell – Dr Martin
- Patrick Magee – Lionel Rutherford
- Geoffrey Bayldon – Max Reynolds
- Frank Forsyth – Asylum gatekeeper

=== "Frozen Fear" ===
The first patient, Bonnie, was the mistress of Walter, an opportunist who married his controlling wife Ruth for her money. Ruth grew up in an unspecified part of Africa and maintains a respect for its magical traditions, whose power allegedly extends "beyond life and death". Unable to get a divorce, Walter murders Ruth with Bonnie's connivance. He dismembers the corpse and stores the pieces in a chest freezer until they can be disposed of properly. Carelessly he tosses Ruth's magic bracelet into the freezer as well, bringing her back to life. Bonnie arrives and finds that Walter has been strangled by Ruth's disembodied arm. The body parts attack her as well, and she injures her face fending them off. Subsequently Ruth's remains vanish, and the authorities decide that Bonnie murdered Walter.

The story is based on Bloch's short story of the same name that was first printed in the May 1946 issue of Weird Tales.

- Barbara Parkins – Bonnie
- Sylvia Syms – Ruth
- Richard Todd – Walter

=== "The Weird Tailor" ===
The second patient, Bruno, is found miming the act of stitching fabric, and says he was a tailor before coming to the asylum. In his account, poverty and impending eviction force him to accept the unusual request of a Mr Smith, who wants a suit made in a highly ritualistic manner from a mysterious, scintillating fabric that must be sewn only after midnight. Smith says it will be a present for his son.

Bruno delivers the finished suit in person to Mr Smith, and finds his house bare of furniture except for a coffin containing the son's corpse. Smith explains that the suit was ordered to the specifications of an ancient magical text, and that the dead man will return to life when dressed in it. Bruno wants to back out of the deal, especially when he learns that Smith bankrupted himself to buy the magic book and cannot pay for the suit. Smith tries to take it at gunpoint, but is shot and killed by Bruno in the ensuing struggle.

Bruno brings home the book and the suit and tells his wife Anna to burn them, but she instead uses the suit to adorn Otto, their store mannequin. The mannequin comes to life and strangles Bruno; he survives the attack, but his explanation of what happened, along with his belief that Otto is still at large somewhere in the city, lead him to be declared insane.

This story was based on Bloch's short story also called "The Weird Taylor" that was first published in the July 1950 issue of Weird Tales and had previously been adapted as an episode of the Boris Karloff-hosted television series Thriller ("The Weird Tailor", Season 2, Episode 4).

- Barry Morse – Bruno
- Peter Cushing – Mr Smith
- Ann Firbank – Anna
- John Franklyn-Robbins – Stebbins

=== "Lucy Comes To Stay" ===
The third patient, Barbara, demands a lawyer, telling Martin that she was convicted for two murders committed by her friend Lucy, whom only she can see.

In flashback, Barbara is shown receiving home care from a nurse, Miss Higgins, courtesy of her brother George. Lucy pays secret visits, claiming that Barbara is not mentally ill, and that George is claiming otherwise to gain custody of her property. Under Lucy's influence, Barbara ceases taking her medication and agrees to run away from home. Lucy kills both George and Higgins to facilitate the escape.

Barbara says that Martin should talk to Lucy as well, and indicates her own reflection in a mirror. The mirror is seen momentarily from Barbara's viewpoint, with her face changing to Lucy's and back again.

- Charlotte Rampling – Barbara
- Britt Ekland – Lucy
- James Villiers – George
- Megs Jenkins – Miss Higgins

=== "Mannequins of Horror" ===
The fourth and last patient is Dr Byron, who declares his mastery of neurology and other branches of the discipline, and appears to hold Rutherford in contempt. Initially elated by the chance to speak with a new colleague, Byron tells Martin that he has become interested in a new direction of research, involving the assembly of small dolls. According to Byron, the dolls contain functional human organs in miniature, and will come to life if he projects his vital spirit into them through sheer will and concentration. Seeing that Martin does not believe him, Byron angrily sends him away. Martin returns downstairs to deliver his judgment to Rutherford.

This story was later loosely adapted for the Monsters episode "Mannequins of Horror".

- Herbert Lom – Dr Byron

=== Epilogue ===
Left alone, Byron successfully projects his consciousness into a mannequin whose face he modeled as a self-portrait. The doll slips out of the room as Max delivers Byron's food, and makes its way downstairs in a dumbwaiter. Meanwhile Martin is criticizing Rutherford for keeping the patients isolated and denying them therapeutic care. As Rutherford declares that Byron should be deprived of his toys, and perhaps lobotomised, the doll climbs onto his desk and stabs him to death with a lancet.

Horrified, Martin crushes the doll, which breaks open to reveal living viscera inside; Dr Byron dies in his room on the spot. Martin goes to Max's room to telephone for help, but finds a corpse concealed there. The man who has been passing as Max Reynolds is Dr Starr, whose murder of the real orderly went unnoticed because Rutherford could not go upstairs. Starr throttles Martin with a stethoscope.

In the last scene, another new doctor is shown knocking on the institute's doors and being received by "Max". It appears that another cycle of murder and mayhem is about to begin.

== Production ==
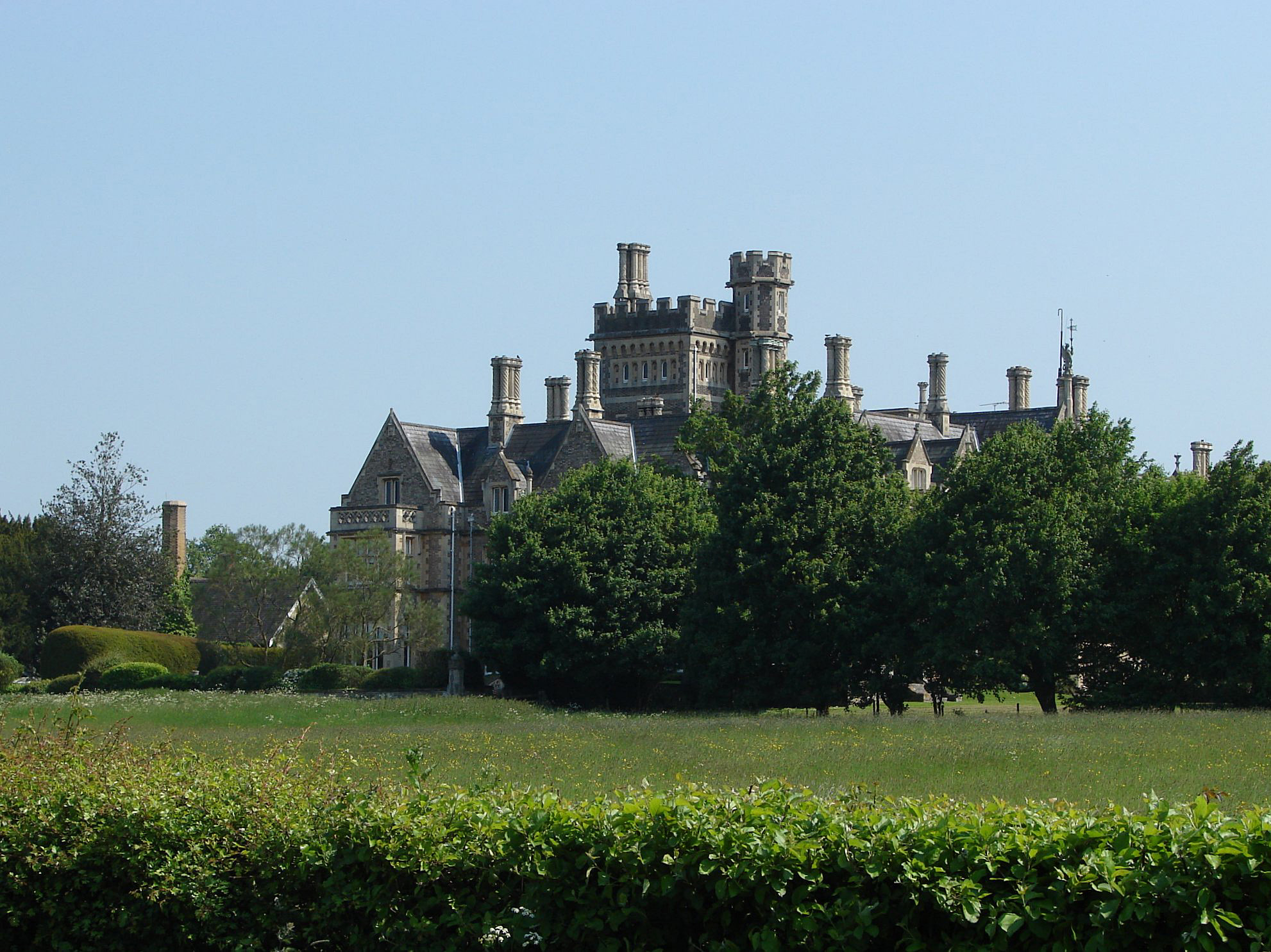
New Lodge, the filming location

=== Filming ===
The film was shot at the New Lodge country house, just outside the village of Winkfield, Berkshire, England.

=== Soundtrack ===
Douglas Gamley is credited as having composed the music for this film, but the score also draws heavily on public domain pieces by Modest Mussorgsky, in particular Night on Bald Mountain (heard over the opening and closing credits). Selections from his Pictures at an Exhibition are also used: "Gnomus" is heard as Martin looks at a series of engravings depicting the imprisonment of an 18th-century madman, and during the sequence of Byron's mannequin coming to life and making its way downstairs. The booming crescendo of "The Hut on Hen's Legs" is heard over the sequence where Otto the tailor's dummy comes to life and attacks Bruno.

== Release ==
In the UK, Asylum was one of Amicus's more popular films. Despite this, it was the last movie Bloch wrote for the studio.

=== Critical reception ===
Allmovie's review of the film is favourable: "Asylum is a textbook example of the skill that Amicus Productions showed for producing entertaining horror anthology films."

=== Accolades ===
Year	Award / Film Festival	Category	Recipient(s)	Result
1973	2nd French Fantastic Cinema Convention	Golden Licorn (Best Film)	Asylum	Won

=== Home media ===
After years of releases sourced from degraded 35mm and 16mm prints (the 16mm prints were used for television broadcast), the film finally received a deluxe DVD release in 2006, from Dark Sky Films. This DVD includes numerous special features, including an audio commentary by director Baker and cameraman Neil Binney; "Inside the Fear Factory", a featurette about Amicus Productions; cast and crew bios; liner notes; trailers; and a still photo gallery. The film was remastered from a pristine, 35mm print. In 2017, Severin Films rereleased Asylum on video, including many of the extras from the Dark Sky Films DVD. New special features were added as well, including an interview with Fiona Subotsky, the producer's widow, who discusses his life, and the history of Amicus.
