= The City of the Dead (film) =

1960 British film by John Moxey

- Theatrical release poster
- Directed by: John Llewellyn Moxey (as John Moxey)
- Screenplay by: George Baxt
- Story by: Milton Subotsky
- Produced by: Seymour S. Dorner; Max Rosenberg (uncredited); Milton Subotsky; Donald Taylor
- Starring: Christopher Lee; Venetia Stevenson; Betta St. John; Dennis Lotis; Valentine Dyall; Patricia Jessel
- Cinematography: Desmond Dickinson
- Edited by: John Pomeroy
- Music by: Douglas Gamley; Ken Jones (jazz)
- Production company: Vulcan
- Distributed by: British Lion
- Release dates: September 1960 (UK); 1961 (US)
- Running time: 78 minutes
- Country: United Kingdom
- Language: English
- Budget: £45,000 or £47,341

The City of the Dead (also titled Horror Hotel in the United States) is a 1960 British supernatural horror film directed by John Llewellyn Moxey and starring Christopher Lee, Venetia Stevenson, Betta St. John, Patricia Jessel and Valentine Dyall. The film marks the directorial debut of Moxey. It was produced in the United Kingdom but set in America, and the British actors were required to speak with North American accents throughout.

== Plot ==
In 1692 in fictional Whitewood, Massachusetts, a witch named Elizabeth Selwyn is burned at the stake. Before her death, Selwyn and her accomplice, Jethrow Keane, sold their souls to Lucifer for eternal life and revenge on Whitewood in return for providing the Devil with two yearly virgin human sacrifices on the Hour of Thirteen during Candlemas Eve and the Witches' Sabbath.

In the present day, following his lecture on witchcraft, a university history professor, Alan Driscoll, advises an interested student named Nan Barlow to visit Whitewood during her vacation to slake her interest in witchcraft by studying Whitewood's history. Nan settles in The Raven's Inn, a hotel owned by eccentric Mrs. Newless, becoming acquainted with the only normal-seeming local resident Patricia Russell, who loans her a book on witchcraft. Reading the book, Nan learns that this night is Candlemas Eve.

She is lured down to the basement and is restrained on a satanic altar by Mrs. Newless and members of her coven. Mrs. Newless reveals herself to be Elizabeth Selwyn before proceeding to sacrifice Nan.

Two weeks later, Nan's concerned fiancé, Bill Maitland, and her brother, Richard, learn The Raven's Inn does not exist in any phone directory. They are visited by Patricia, who is also concerned with Nan's disappearance. The men travel separately to Whitewood, and Bill barely survives a car crash caused by an apparition of Selwyn.

Richard reaches Whitewood and meets up with Patricia before visiting her grandfather, Reverend Russell, who reveals that Whitewood is under the control of Selwyn's coven. Soon after, Patricia is kidnapped as the coven's sacrifice, and Richard attempts to save her before they are cornered in the graveyard. Professor Driscoll is revealed to be a coven member. A severely-injured Bill arrives at the last minute and succeeds in extricating a large wooden cross from the ground. After being gravely wounded by Selwyn, Bill uses the last of his strength to burn the coven members alive under the cross's shadow. Selwyn escapes during the chaos. Her pact with the Devil has been undone by the intervention, and Richard and Patricia find her charred corpse in the hotel which was earlier revealed to have been built on the site of her burning.

== Cast ==
- Christopher Lee as Alan Driscoll - history professor and secret member of Whitewood's coven
- Dennis Lotis as Richard 'Dick' Barlow - Nan's sceptical brother and intellectual opponent to Driscoll; he searches for Nan following her disappearance
- Patricia Jessel as Elizabeth Selwyn / Mrs. Newless - the witch who cursed Whitewood and supposed leader of Whitewood's coven; she is later reincarnated as an innkeeper
- Tom Naylor as Bill Maitland - Nan's loyal fiancé. In the movie's end credits, the character is mistakenly identified as "Tom Maitland".
- Betta St. John as Patricia Russell - an antiques dealer and granddaughter of Whitewood's pastor
- Venetia Stevenson as Nan Barlow - a curious history student researching witchcraft
- Valentine Dyall as Jethrow Keane - Elizabeth's lover and fellow witch, he plays a pivotal role in selecting human sacrifices
- Ann Beach as Lottie - the mute housekeeper at Raven's Inn, who discreetly tries to work against the coven
- Norman MacOwan as Reverend Russell - the blind pastor of Whitewood
- Fred Johnson as The Elder
- James Dyrenforth as Garage Attendant
- Maxine Holden as Sue - Friend
- William Abney as Policeman

== Production ==
The script was originally written by George Baxt as a pilot for a television series starring Boris Karloff. The producer Milton Subotsky rewrote it to be longer, including a romantic subplot about the boyfriend who goes looking for Nan after she goes missing. Financing was obtained from television producer Hannah Weinstein, along with money from the Nottingham Forest Football Club.

Production began on 12 October 1959 at Shepperton Studios with a budget of £45,000. Milton Subotsky was credited as the film's executive producer. The film was produced by Vulcan Productions, although because it was made by Subotsky and producing partner Max Rosenberg it has been considered the first of their Amicus Productions.

=== Deleted lines ===
Some dialogue was removed from the American version of the film, including the following lines in the opening sequence which clarify the plot. They are retained in the original British version, which has been shown on Turner Classic Movies:

- "I have made my pact with thee, O Lucifer! Hear me, hear me! I will do thy bidding for all eternity. For all eternity shall I practice the ritual of Black Mass. For all eternity shall I sacrifice unto thee. I give thee my soul, take me into thy service."
- "O Lucifer, listen to thy servant, grant her this pact for all eternity and I with her, and if we fail thee but once, you may do with our souls what you will."
- "Make this city an example of thy vengeance. Curse it, curse it for all eternity! Let me be the instrument of thy curse. Hear me, O Lucifer, hear me!"

== Release ==
The City of the Dead was released in September 1960 in the United Kingdom. It was a box-office disappointment, although it did make a small profit. It was not released in the United States until 1961 under the title Horror Hotel.

== Legacy ==
Heavy metal band Iron Maiden used scenes from the film in the music video for their 1990 song "Bring Your Daughter... to the Slaughter".

King Diamond also used clips in his "Sleepless Nights" video, as did punk band UFX in the video to "Bitch", while Rob Zombie used Christopher Lee's opening words to similarly preface his track "Dragula" from Hellbilly Deluxe. In addition, the punk band Misfits wrote a song called "Horror Hotel" (the American release title). In 2017, heavy metal band In This Moment also used the opening lines by Christopher Lee in their song "Witching Hour", from their album Ritual. Uncredited footage from the opening scene is used in Evil Calls: The Raven to represent the death of Lenore Selwyn (Elizabeth Selwyn in the original).

The movie is shown in the background of the seventh episode of the Apple TV series Widow’s Bay, which shares similar colonial New England occult themes including a present-day tie to a demonic past.

== See also ==
- Christopher Lee filmography
- List of films in the public domain in the United States

== Bibliography ==
- Chibnall, Jonathan; McFarlane, Brian (2009). The British 'B' Film. Palgrave Macmillan. ISBN 9781844575749.
- Rigby, Jonathan (2000). English Gothic: A Century of Horror Cinema. Reynolds & Hearn Ltd. ISBN 1903111013.
