= Ronald Chetwynd-Hayes =

British author (1919–2001)

- Born: 30 May 1919; Isleworth, London, England
- Died: 20 March 2001 (aged 81); Teddington, London, England
- Occupations: Novelist, short-story writer
- Writing career
- Genres: Horror, mystery, fantasy, science fiction
- Notable awards: Bram Stoker Award for Lifetime Achievement; British Fantasy Society Special Award

Ronald Henry Glynn Chetwynd-Hayes (30 May 1919 – 20 March 2001) was a British author, known best for his ghost and horror stories. He also published stories using the names Angus Campbell and Henry Glynn.

== Biography ==
Prior to becoming a full-time writer, Chetwynd-Hayes worked in the furnishing trade. His first published work was the science fiction novel The Man From The Bomb of 1959. He subsequently published many collections and ten other novels including The Grange, The Haunted Grange, And Love Survived and The Curse of the Snake God. Several of his short works were adapted into anthology-style movies in the United Kingdom, including The Monster Club and From Beyond the Grave. Chetwynd-Hayes' book The Monster Club contains references to a movie-maker named Vinke Rocnnor, an anagram of Kevin Connor, the director of From Beyond The Grave. John Carradine played Chetwynd-Hayes in The Monster Club.

He also edited more than 20 anthologies. Chetwynd-Hayes assumed the editorship of the Fontana Book of Great Ghost Stories after the departure of the previous editor, Robert Aickman. Chetwynd-Hayes also edited several other anthologies, including the Armada Monster Book series for children. Chetwynd-Hayes was nicknamed "Britain's Prince of Chill" by British horror fandom.

== Reception ==
Mike Ashley described Chetwynd-Hayes' story "The Gatecrasher", about the ghost of Jack the Ripper, as a "powerful tale". Chris Morgan stated about Chetwynd-Hayes: "at his best he is a fine writer, capable of producing gripping and wonderfully atmospheric stories at all lengths".

== Awards ==
He won the Bram Stoker Award for Lifetime Achievement for 1988, and the British Fantasy Society Special Award in 1989.

== Death ==
Chetwynd-Hayes died from bronchial pneumonia on 20 March 2001.

== See also ==
- List of horror fiction authors
