= Amicus Productions =

British film production company

- Type: Production company
- Industry: Film production
- Founded: 1962; 64 years ago
- Founder: Milton Subotsky; Max Rosenberg
- Headquarters: Shepperton, England, England
- Website: amicushorror.co.uk

Amicus Productions was a British film production company, based at Shepperton Studios, England, active between 1962 and 1977. It was founded by American producers and screenwriters Milton Subotsky and Max Rosenberg. The company was best known for its distinctive style of portmanteau (anthology) horror films.

The Amicus brand was resurrected in 2023 under the leadership of Lawrie Brewster.

== Films ==
Prior to establishing Amicus, its two producers collaborated on the successful horror film The City of the Dead (1960). Amicus's first two films were low-budget musicals for the teenage market, It's Trad, Dad! (1962) and Just for Fun (1963). Amicus is best remembered for making a series of horror portmanteau or anthology films, inspired by Ealing Studios' Dead of Night (1945). They also made some straight thriller films, often based on a gimmick.

Amicus's horror and thriller films are sometimes mistaken for the output of the better-known Hammer Film Productions, due to the two companies' similar visual style and use of some of the same actors, including Peter Cushing and Christopher Lee. Unlike the period gothic Hammer films, Amicus productions were usually set in the present day.

Although not an Amicus Productions film, a film version of Harold Pinter's play The Birthday Party (1968), directed by William Friedkin, was produced by the team of Subotsky and Rosenberg for Palomar Pictures International.

=== Portmanteau horror films ===
Amicus released seven portmanteau films; Dr. Terror's House of Horrors (1965), Torture Garden (1967), The House That Dripped Blood (1971), Tales from the Crypt (1972), Asylum (1972), Vault of Horror (1973) and From Beyond the Grave (1974). These films typically feature four or sometimes five short horror stories, linked by an overarching plot featuring a narrator and those listening to his story.

The casts of these films are invariably composed of name actors, each of whom play a main part in one of the stories—a small proportion of the film as a whole. Along with genre stars like Cushing, Lee and Herbert Lom, Amicus also drew its actors from the classical British stage (Patrick Magee, Margaret Leighton and Ralph Richardson), rising younger actors (Donald Sutherland, Robert Powell and Tom Baker), or former stars in decline (Richard Greene, Robert Hutton, and Terry-Thomas). Some, such as Joan Collins, were in their mid-career doldrums when they worked with Amicus, while others such as Jon Pertwee and Tom Baker were at the height of their careers (with Pertwee starring as the third incarnation of the Doctor in the science-fiction series Doctor Who at the time The House That Dripped Blood was released, and Baker debuting as the Fourth Doctor one year after his appearance in Vault of Horror).

Torture Garden, The House That Dripped Blood and Asylum were written by Robert Bloch, based upon his own stories. An exception was the "Waxworks" segment of The House That Dripped Blood, which was scripted (uncredited) by Russ Jones, based on Bloch's story. Tales from the Crypt and The Vault of Horror were based on stories from EC horror comics from the 1950s.

=== Other horror films ===
Amicus also produced some conventional chillers, such as The Skull (1965), The Psychopath (1966), Scream and Scream Again (1970), I, Monster (1971), And Now the Screaming Starts! (1973), and The Beast Must Die (1974). The Skull was also based on a Bloch story (though scripted by Milton Subotsky). Bloch was also the screenwriter of The Psychopath (1966), and wrote the original adaptation of The Deadly Bees (based upon H. F. Heard's A Taste for Honey).

=== Science fiction, espionage, drama ===
In the mid-1960s, Amicus also produced two films based on Doctor Who which had debuted on television in 1963. The films, Dr. Who and the Daleks (1965) and Daleks' Invasion Earth 2150 A.D. (1966), are the only theatrical film adaptations of the series. In these films, Peter Cushing played "Dr. Who", a human scientist rather than an alien, with Who as his actual surname, disregarding the then-nebulous backstory of the TV series.

Amicus also funded and produced films of other genres. Danger Route (1967) was a film version of Christopher Nicole's (writing as Andrew York) 1966 spy novel The Eliminator, directed by Seth Holt, the only film of the Jonas Wilde series of novels to have been filmed.

Margaret Drabble's adaptation of her novel The Millstone (1965) was filmed as A Touch of Love (1969), and Laurence Moody's novel The Ruthless Ones (1969) was filmed as What Became of Jack and Jill? (1972)

Amicus Productions produced a few science fiction films, including a 1967 double bill of The Terrornauts and They Came from Beyond Space that were produced when Joseph E. Levine, who Rosenberg had previously worked with, told Rosenberg that if Amicus could produce two films for £200,000, Embassy Pictures would finance and release both of them.

Amicus later produced a trilogy of adaptations of the works of Edgar Rice Burroughs, including The Land That Time Forgot (1974), At the Earth's Core (1976), and The People That Time Forgot (1977).

== 2000s ==
In 2003, Anchor Bay Entertainment released a five disc DVD box-set of Amicus films in a coffin-shaped container in the UK. In 2005, Amicus was revived to produce homages to the old titles as well as original horror fare. Their first production was Stuart Gordon's Stuck (2007).

== Resurrection of Amicus ==
In 2023 it was announced that Amicus would recommence film production, led by Lawrie Brewster, Sarah Daly and Megan Tremethick, with support from the Subotsky family. Amicus would produce the upcoming film In the Grip of Terror. Variety reported "The filmmaker (Brewster) and his team are also starting a crowdfunding campaign to facilitate the initial stages of the project. Their goal is far more ambitious than just one film. 'Our aim is to re-establish Amicus Productions as a beacon of independent British horror', Brewster said."

In the Grip of Terror was released on May 24, 2025 at the Romford Film Festival. As of 2026, the film has not received a theatrical or digital release, but is available as a Blu-ray edition or as a downloadable file.

== Filmography ==
- It's Trad, Dad! (1962)
- Just for Fun (1963)
- Dr. Terror's House of Horrors (1965)
- Dr. Who and the Daleks (1965)
- The Skull (1965)
- The Psychopath (1966)
- Daleks' Invasion Earth 2150 A.D. (1966)
- The Deadly Bees (1967)
- The Terrornauts (1967)
- They Came from Beyond Space (1967)
- Torture Garden (1967)
- Danger Route (1967)
- A Touch of Love (1969)
- Scream and Scream Again (1970)
- The Mind of Mr. Soames (1970)
- The House That Dripped Blood (1971)
- I, Monster (1971)
- Tales from the Crypt (1972)
- What Became of Jack and Jill? (1972)
- Asylum (1972)
- The Vault of Horror (1973)
- And Now the Screaming Starts! (1973)
- From Beyond the Grave (1974)
- Madhouse (1974)
- The Beast Must Die (1974)
- The Land That Time Forgot (1974)
- At the Earth's Core (1976)
- The People That Time Forgot (1977)
- In the Grip of Terror (2025)
