= Max Rosenberg =

American film producer

- Born: Max J. Rosenberg; September 13, 1914; New York City, US
- Died: June 14, 2004 (aged 89); Los Angeles, California, US
- Occupation: Film producer
- Years active: 1945–1997
- Organization: Amicus Productions (co-founded with Milton Subotsky)

Max J. Rosenberg (September 13, 1914 – June 14, 2004) was an American film distributor and producer, whose career spanned six decades. He was particularly known for his horror or supernatural films, and found much of his success while working in England.

== Life and career ==
Rosenberg was born in The Bronx, New York City, to a family of Jewish immigrants. His father was a furrier. In 1945, he entered the film business by becoming a film distributor, using the business names Classic Pictures Inc. and, occasionally, National Roadshows. As such, he first distributed mainly reissues, but by 1950 was adding a range of film types (from Murder in the Cathedral to Chained For Life).

He entered production with the film Rock, Rock, Rock (1956), a rock-and-roll story. His partner in the production of this film was Milton Subotsky. Subsequently, he and Subotsky emigrated to England, where they founded the British company Amicus Productions in 1962. With Amicus, he primarily produced horror or supernatural films, such as Dr. Terror's House of Horrors in 1965, the title of which he had originally used for a National Roadshows film of 1945.

Over the course of his career, Rosenberg produced more than 50 films, although his work was not always credited. Among the other horror and supernatural films he produced were such titles as Tales from the Crypt (1972), The Land That Time Forgot (1974), and its sequel, The People That Time Forgot (1977).

Rosenberg also produced a children's film, Lad, a Dog (1962), director Richard Lester's first film, It's Trad, Dad! (1962), and two films based on the Doctor Who British science-fiction television series: Dr. Who and the Daleks (1965) and Daleks' Invasion Earth 2150 A.D. (1966). He was particularly proud to have produced the 1968 film of Harold Pinter's The Birthday Party, starring Robert Shaw and directed by William Friedkin. Rosenberg continued to work well into his 80s; his final film credit was 1997's Perdita Durango (a.k.a. Dance with the Devil).

Rosenberg's companion was Arlene Becker. He had two daughters, Elizabeth and Naomi. Elizabeth married Richard Rumelt; they had one child, fantasy novelist Cassandra Clare.

Rosenberg died in Los Angeles, California in 2004, at the age of 89.

== Selected credits ==
- Rock, Rock, Rock (1956)
- City of the Dead (1960)
- The Last Mile (1960)
- Girl of the Night (1960)
- Lad, A Dog (1961)
- It's Trad, Dad! (1962)
- Just for Fun (1963)
