= The Doctor and the Devils =

1985 British film by Freddie Francis

- Theatrical release poster
- Directed by: Freddie Francis
- Written by: Ronald Harwood; Dylan Thomas
- Produced by: Jonathan Sanger
- Starring: Timothy Dalton; Jonathan Pryce; Stephen Rea; Julian Sands; Patrick Stewart; Twiggy
- Cinematography: Gerry Turpin; Norman Warwick
- Edited by: Lawrence Méry-Clark
- Music by: John Morris
- Production company: Brooksfilms
- Distributed by: 20th Century Fox
- Release date: 4 October 1985
- Running time: 93 minutes
- Countries: United Kingdom; United States
- Language: English
- Budget: $5-7 million
- Box office: $147,070

The Doctor and The Devils is a 1985 gothic horror film directed by Freddie Francis and starring Timothy Dalton, Jonathan Pryce, Stephen Rea, Julian Sands, Patrick Stewart and Twiggy. It is based upon the true story of William Burke and William Hare, who in 1828 Edinburgh, Scotland, murdered at least 16 people and sold their bodies for anatomical dissection.

The film was produced by Mel Brooks, through his production company Brooksfilms. The script was adapted by Ronald Harwood from an unproduced screenplay by Dylan Thomas. A previous attempt to film the script in 1965, by director Nicholas Ray, had failed due to production troubles.

The film was released on October 4, 1985, to mixed reviews. It was one of the last films directed by Freddie Francis, before he returned to cinematography full-time.

== Plot ==
In 1828, Dr Thomas Rock is a respected anatomist lecturing at a prominent medical school. He is deeply passionate about improving medical knowledge, a pursuit for which he believes "the ends justify the means." Unfortunately, due to the laws of the time very few cadavers are legally available to the medical profession, necessitating the use of body snatchers or "Resurrection men" by the medical establishment to procure additional specimens. Dr Rock's young assistant Dr Murray is given the task of buying the bodies, for which he is authorized to pay a small fortune, particularly for fresher corpses.

When alcoholic miscreants Robert Fallon and Timothy Broom overhear details of the arrangement, they begin to murder the locals and sell their bodies. Gradually, Dr Murray becomes more suspicious of the string of fresh bodies turning up at the medical school, but Dr Rock dismisses his concerns. Meanwhile, Murray has begun to fall for beautiful local prostitute Jennie Bailey, who soon becomes the target of Fallon and Broom's murderous enterprise. When Jennie's friend Alice turns up dead in Dr Rock's dissection room, Murray realizes what is happening and heroically rescues Jennie from a murderous Fallon. Both killers are soon arrested, but Broom agrees to turn state's evidence against his former partner, and is set free, unrepentant. Fallon is executed by hanging. Dr Rock, for his part in the killings, is the subject of widespread public outrage, but ultimately not punished or censured by his colleagues.

The film ends with Rock pondering his responsibility for the horrors and concluding, "Oh my God – I knew what I was doing."

== Cast ==
- Timothy Dalton as Dr Thomas Rock (based on Robert Knox)
- Jonathan Pryce as Robert Fallon (William Burke)
- Twiggy as Jennie Bailey
- Julian Sands as Dr Murray
- Stephen Rea as Timothy Broom (William Hare)
- Patrick Stewart as Professor Macklin
- Lewis Fiander as Dr Thornton
- Phyllis Logan as Elizabeth Rock
- Beryl Reid as Mrs Flynn
- T. P. McKenna as O'Connor
- Siân Phillips as Annabella Rock
- Philip Davis as Billy Bedlam
- Philip Jackson as Andrew Merry-Lees
- David Bamber as Cronin
- Nichola McAuliffe as Alice
- Dermot Crowley as Mr Webb
- Stephen Yardley as Joseph
- John Horsley as Dr Mackendrick
- Jack May as Dr Stevens
- Rachel Herbert as Mrs Stevens
- Simon Shepherd as Harding
- David Parfitt as Billings
- Jeff Rawle as Lambert
- W. Morgan Sheppard as landlord
- Jennifer Jayne as barmaid
- Moira Brooker as Molly the maid
- Roy Evans as sewerman
- Peter Burton as customer
- Leonard Maguire as nightwatchman
- Ray Dunbobbin as tinker
- Shaun Curry as policeman

== Abandoned 1965 version ==
Dylan Thomas' unproduced screenplay The Doctor and the Devils was first published in 1953. J. Arthur Rank had purchased the rights in 1956, before selling them to Nicholas Ray, who intended to direct with Maximilian Schell in the lead role. Borislav Mihajlović Mihiz and Gore Vidal were to rewrite Thomas' script, and filming was set to begin in Yugoslavia in September 1965.

Production was initially delayed due to weather conditions, then again after Schell alleged he had not been paid by the producers. In December 1965, he quit the film, and Laurence Harvey was set as his replacement. The film was officially cancelled in November after Warner Bros.-Seven Arts backed out of its "pre-production buy of worldwide distribution rights."

At one time in the 1970's, Michael Winner was attached to direct Thomas' script, with Paul Scofield in the lead role.

== Production ==
=== Development ===
Brooksfilms founder and executive producer Mel Brooks, a lifelong horror fan, acquired the rights to Thomas's screenplay in the hopes of adapting it into a horror film. He hired director and former cinematographer Freddie Francis, who during the 1960s and 70s had directed a series of horror films for famed British horror productions companies Hammer and Amicus. Brooks' original intention was to simply use the title of the Thomas screenplay, but Francis pushed for a closer adherence to the original script. A compromise was arranged with playwright and screenwriter Ronald Harwood adapting Thomas's more cerebral work into something more genre-friendly. Despite the adaptation, much of Thomas's original dialogue remains.

Francis had previously been approached to direct a film of Thomas' script in the mid-1970s. Francis had last directed a film in 1975, Tyburn Film Productions' Legend of the Werewolf. He had returned to cinematography in 1980 for the Brooks-produced The Elephant Man, for which he was nominated for a BAFTA Award for Best Cinematography at the 34th British Academy Film Awards.

Francis recalled, "this was one we had for a long time. A doctor friend of mine owned it, and he got the rights, he got the rights off Nick Ray. I suspect that Nick Ray owed him money, and he spent a lot of time trying to set it up. We eventually set it up with Mel Brooks. Mel Brook's thought he owed me a favour after Elephant Man [sic] and so he set it up and off we went. It wasn't a bad little film."

=== Filming ===
Principal photography took place at Shepperton Studios. Francis originally intended to shoot the film in black-and-white. He still sought to achieve a monochrome effect on the colour film, by using a flat colour palate. Francis and cinematographer Gerry Turpin used the latter's "LightFlex" system, which used a lens-mounted device to pre-expose the film stock.

Several of the cast and crew had previously worked together on The Elephant Man, including Francis, producers Brooks and Jonathan Sanger, composer John Morris, and actor W. Morgan Sheppard. Elephant Man actor Freddie Jones was offered a role, but turned it down. This was the final film for three of its actors - Jennifer Jayne, Jack May, and Peter Burton. It was also the final film for cinematographer Norman Warwick.

== Reception ==
The film struggled to find an audience, and was not well received by critics.

Roger Ebert gave the film one-and-a-half stars out of four, writing, "It is impossible to discover, on the evidence of The Doctor and the Devils, why anybody connected with this movie thought it should be made. It is unredeemed, dreary, boring, gloomy dreck unilluminated by even the slightest fugitive moment of inspiration or ambition," though he praised star Twiggy as the film's "only ray of sunshine."

Vincent Canby of the New York Times was more positive, writing the film boasts a "first-rate English cast," and adding that "Mr. Harwood's screenplay, which retains a lot of the original Thomas dialogue, is much more fun to see than the Thomas screenplay is to read."

The film was nominated for the Grand Prix at the 1986 Avoriaz International Fantastic Film Festival.

== See also ==
- The Greed of William Hart (1948)
- The Flesh and the Fiends (1960)
- Burke & Hare (1971)
- Burke & Hare (2010)
