= Tyburn Film Productions =

UK film production company

Tyburn Film Productions was a British film production company founded by Kevin Francis active between 1973 and 1989.

== History ==
The company was co-founded by Kevin Francis, son of director Freddie Francis, in 1971 with another partner whom Francis refused to identify with Francis becoming the sole owner in 1973. Francis, as a horror fan, sought to make Tyburn a successor to Hammer Film Productions and Amicus Productions. Tyburn hired Jimmy Sangster and Anthony Hinds to write screenplays for Tyburn based on their contributions to early Hammer films. Of the theatrical films produced by Tyburn, only Persecution was able to attain distribution in the United States while Tyburn's subsequent films The Ghoul and Legend of the Werewolf were not. Due to the lack of international demand for British horror productions Tyburn ceased development of any further theatrical films.

== Films ==
=== Released ===
==== Theatrical ====
- Persecution
- The Ghoul
- Legend of the Werewolf

==== Television ====
- The Masks of Death
- Murder Elite
- Peter Cushing: A One Way Ticket to Hollywood

=== Unmade ===
- The Satanists- an Anthony Hinds (as John Elder) scripted horror film adapted from the novel The Satanist by Dennis Wheatley which would've featured Peter Cushing as an aging Oxford Don who along with his daughter rush to the aid of a friend in the village of St. Marywood and are attacked by Satan worshippers.
- Dracula's Feast of Blood
- An adaptation of The Hunchback of Notre-Dame
- Colado an adaptation of a book by John Frayn Turner with no further details disclosed.
