= The Ghoul (1975 film) =

1975 British film by Freddie Francis

- UK VHS cover
- Directed by: Freddie Francis
- Written by: Anthony Hinds (as John Elder)
- Produced by: Kevin Francis
- Starring: Peter Cushing; John Hurt; Alexandra Bastedo; Gwen Watford; Veronica Carlson; Don Henderson
- Cinematography: John Wilcox
- Edited by: Henry Richardson
- Music by: Harry Robertson
- Production company: Tyburn Film Productions
- Distributed by: Rank Film Distributors
- Release date: May 1975 (UK)
- Running time: 93 minutes
- Country: United Kingdom
- Language: English

The Ghoul (also released as Night Of The Ghoul and The Thing In The Attic) is a 1975 British horror film directed by Freddie Francis from a screenplay by Anthony Hinds, and starring Peter Cushing, John Hurt, Alexandra Bastedo, Veronica Carlson, Gwen Watford and Don Henderson.

The film was produced by Francis' son Kevin, through his company Tyburn Film Productions. It was released by Rank Film Distributors in May 1975.

== Plot ==
In 1920s England, a party of friends challenge each other to an automobile race to Land's End. One couple, Daphne Wells Hunter and Billy, run out of petrol, so Billy goes to look for a garage, but takes so long that Daphne goes to search for him. Billy is unable to find a garage and returns to the car to find Daphne gone. Meanwhile, Daphne locates a mansion, but the caretaker, Tom Rawlings, warns her not to go in, fearing that she may never come out alive, but she ignores him. The owner, Mr. Lawrence, a former clergyman, invites her inside to rest and sends Tom to find Billy. Tom finds Billy in the car, and murders him by pushing the vehicle off a cliff.

Meanwhile, Lawrence tells Daphne about his missionary work in India, where an Aghori converted his wife and son to their faith; the former ended up taking her own life in a fit of remorse, and as a result, Lawrence renounced his faith. Lawrence allows Daphne to stay in the guest room for the night. Seeing this, Lawrence's Indian servant, Ayah, lets out a grotesque man from the attic, who goes into Daphne's room and murders her with a katar. Afterwards, Ayah slices up Daphne's flesh and feeds it to the ghoul.

Angela and Geoffrey, the other couple in the race, are called in by the local police to identify Billy's body. They report Daphne's disappearance. The police refuse to search for her as they are afraid of the marshlands. A policeman takes them to the wreck, then leaves, and Geoffrey goes out to search the marsh. Angela tries to drive off but nearly runs over Tom before crashing. Angela wakes up in Tom's cabin. Geoffrey returns to where he left the car and finds the wreck, but not Angela. He finds the house and enters. Lawrence and Ayah demand to know why he is inside the house. Lawrence lies that Daphne had been there just a few hours before but has gone to town by bus. Lawrence says he suspects that Angela took the bus as well. Geoffrey leaves, unsatisfied.

Tom tells Lawrence that Angela knows too much, and takes her to the house. Geoffrey's car is stuck, and he asks Tom for assistance. He is suspicious of Tom, and chases him through the swamp. Tom is stuck in quicksand, and Geoffrey interrogates him before he sinks. Tom reveals that there is something in the house that eats human flesh.

Geoffrey confronts Dr. Lawrence about the lies he has been told. Lawrence catches Ayah doing some kind of “evil rite” and stops her. Geoffrey runs upstairs, despite Lawrence's objections. Geoffrey is stabbed in the head by the ghoul, who is revealed to be Lawrence's cannibal son.

The ghoul escapes from the attic. Tom sneaks into the guest room and attacks Angela, but the ghoul enters and kills him. The ghoul attempts to kill Angela too, but Lawrence reluctantly shoots his son dead. Heartbroken by what he has done, Lawrence commits suicide by shooting himself as Angela escapes.

== Cast ==
- Peter Cushing as Doctor Lawrence
- John Hurt as Tom Rawlings
- Alexandra Bastedo as Angela
- Gwen Watford as Ayah
- Veronica Carlson as Daphne Wells Hunter
- Stewart Bevan as Billy
- Ian McCulloch as Geoffrey
- John D. Collins as Young Man
- Dan Meaden as Police Sergeant
- Don Henderson as Simon Lawrence

== Production ==
The Ghoul was the second film produced by Tyburn Film Productions, shot at Pinewood Studios in Buckinghamshire, from 4 March 1974 recycling sets previously used for 1974's The Great Gatsby. It was one of two horror films Freddie Francis directed for Tyburn, the other being Legend of the Werewolf (also 1975), which was run by his son Kevin.

According to Veronica Carlson, Francis made Peter Cushing do multiple takes during the scene where Dr. Lawrence talks about his love for his late wife Harriet. Having recently lost his own wife, this caused Cushing great distress and reduced him and some of the crew to tears.

== Reception ==
Geoff Brown of The Monthly Film Bulletin wrote: "It comes as a slight surprise to find that Freddie Francis hasn't directed a film called The Ghoul before, but this connoisseur of creeping flesh, deadly bees, skulls and psychopaths now repairs the omission for Tyburn, with his son Kevin acting as producer. To whet our appetite, a dictionary definition is thrust upon the screen ("Ghoul. A person of revolting inhuman tastes"), but for half of the movie Francis keeps his exemplar well out of sight; then he starts to appear from the waist downwards, two blood-stained legs walking around in sandals; in the final minutes the whole body lurches into view, but the mild frisson of horror proves hardly worth the wait. ... only John Hurt injects more than a fraction of life into his character and dialogue, and the clichés quickly dominate: Peter Cushing brings out his violin for a soothing spot of the classics, the local copper mutters veiled warnings before trundling off on his bike, and thick fog swirls round the exterior sets at the drop of a canister."

Variety praised the "assured acting" and "impressive set decoration" but called the film "far too tame for its own good," with a script that "moves from A to Z without generating much excitement and surprise in between."

TV Guide gave the film two stars out of four, writing that "Cushing and other familiar Hammer faces give this the old college try, but Francis' dull direction--endless shots of Henderson's legs creeping down the stairs--makes the cause hopeless."

The Radio Times Guide to Films gave the film 2/5 stars, writing: "A nice feeling for the 1920s period atmosphere and a crazed performance from John Hurt give this fractured slow-mover a few extra kicks."

Leslie Halliwell said: "The build-up is too slow, the revelation too nasty, and the whole thing is a shameless rip-off of the structure of Psycho."
