= Peter Cushing =

English actor (1913–1994)

Peter Cushing OBE
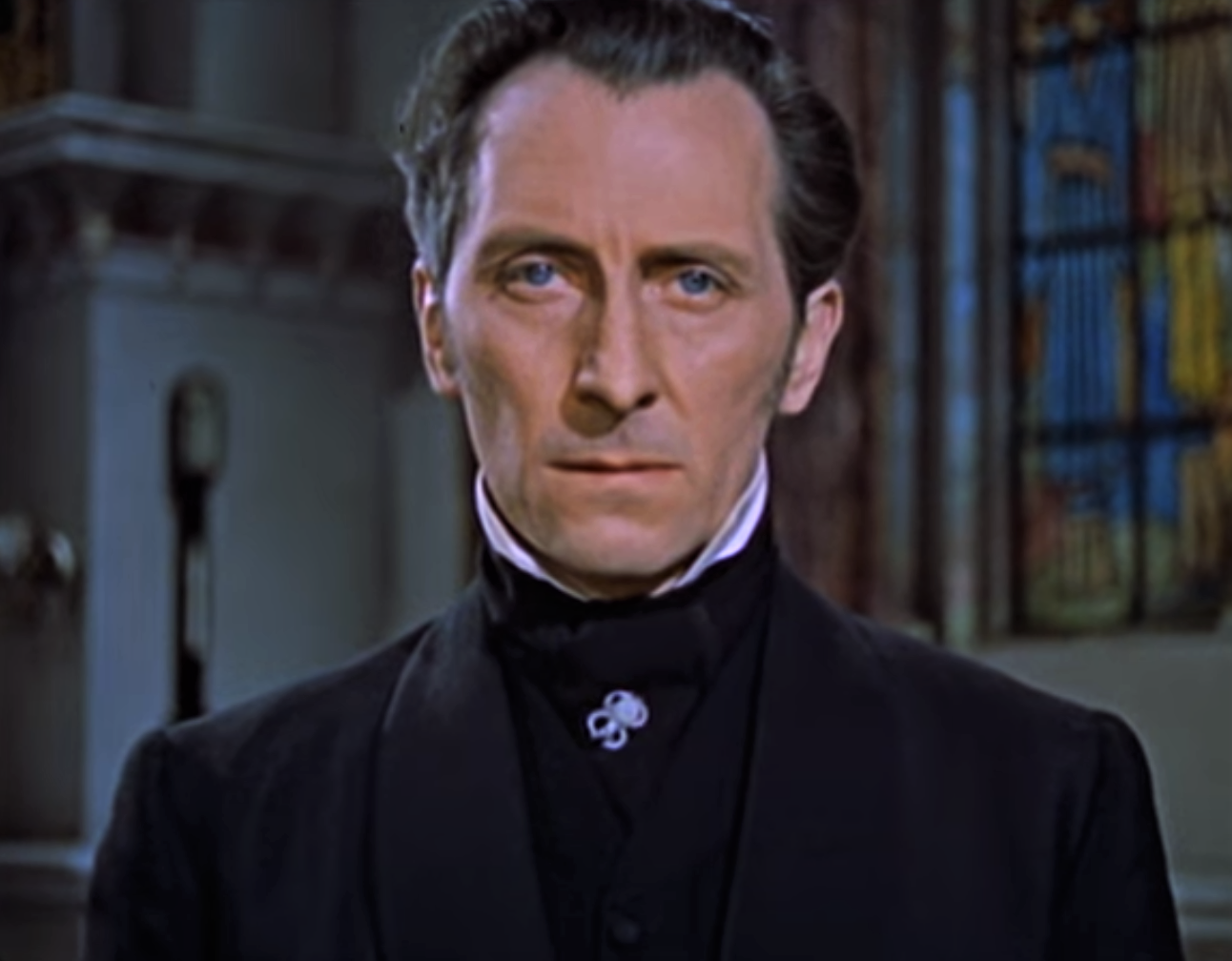
- Cushing in The Revenge of Frankenstein (1958)
- Born: 26 May 1913; Kenley, Surrey, England
- Died: 11 August 1994 (aged 81); Canterbury, Kent, England
- Burial place: Seasalter Old Church, Seasalter, Kent, England
- Education: Guildhall School of Music and Drama
- Occupation: Actor
- Years active: 1935–1994
- Spouse: Violet Hélène Beck (m. 1943; died 1971)
- Awards: British Academy Television Award for Best Actor (1956)

Peter Wilton Cushing (26 May 1913 – 11 August 1994) was an English actor. His acting career spanned over six decades and included appearances in more than 100 films, as well as many television, stage and radio roles. He achieved recognition for his leading performances in the Hammer Productions horror films from the 1950s to 1970s and as Grand Moff Tarkin in Star Wars (1977).

Born in Kenley, Surrey, Cushing made his stage debut in 1935 and spent three years at a repertory theatre before moving to Hollywood to pursue a film career. After making his motion-picture debut in the film The Man in the Iron Mask (1939), Cushing began to find modest success in American films before returning to England at the outbreak of the Second World War. Despite performing in a string of roles, including one as Osric in Laurence Olivier's film adaptation of Hamlet (1948), Cushing struggled to find work during this period. His career was revitalised once he started to work in live television plays and he soon became one of the most recognisable faces in British television. He earned particular acclaim for his lead performance as Winston Smith in a BBC adaptation of George Orwell's Nineteen Eighty-Four (1954).

Cushing gained worldwide fame for his appearances in twenty-two horror films from the Hammer studio, particularly for his role as Baron Frankenstein in six of their seven Frankenstein films and Doctor Van Helsing in five Dracula films. Cushing often appeared alongside the actor Christopher Lee, who became one of his closest friends, and occasionally with the American horror star Vincent Price. Cushing appeared in several other Hammer films, including The Abominable Snowman (1957), The Mummy and The Hound of the Baskervilles (both 1959), the last of which marked the first of the several occasions he portrayed the fictional detective Sherlock Holmes. Cushing continued to perform in a variety of roles, although he was often typecast as a horror film actor. He played Dr. Who in Dr. Who and the Daleks (1965) and Daleks' Invasion Earth 2150 A.D. (1966), and became even better known through his part in the original Star Wars film. Cushing continued acting into the early to mid-1990s and wrote two autobiographies.

== Early life ==
Peter Wilton Cushing was born in Kenley, then a village in the English county of Surrey, on 26 May 1913 to George Edward Cushing (1881–1956) and Nellie Marie (née King) Cushing (1882–1961). His father, a quantity surveyor, was a reserved and uncommunicative man who Peter said he never got to know very well. His mother was the daughter of a carpet merchant and considered of a lower class than her husband. Cushing's family consisted of several stage actors, including his paternal grandfather, Henry William Cushing (who toured with Henry Irving), his paternal aunt Maude Cushing (his father's sister) and his step-uncle Wilton Herriot, after whom Peter Cushing received his middle name.

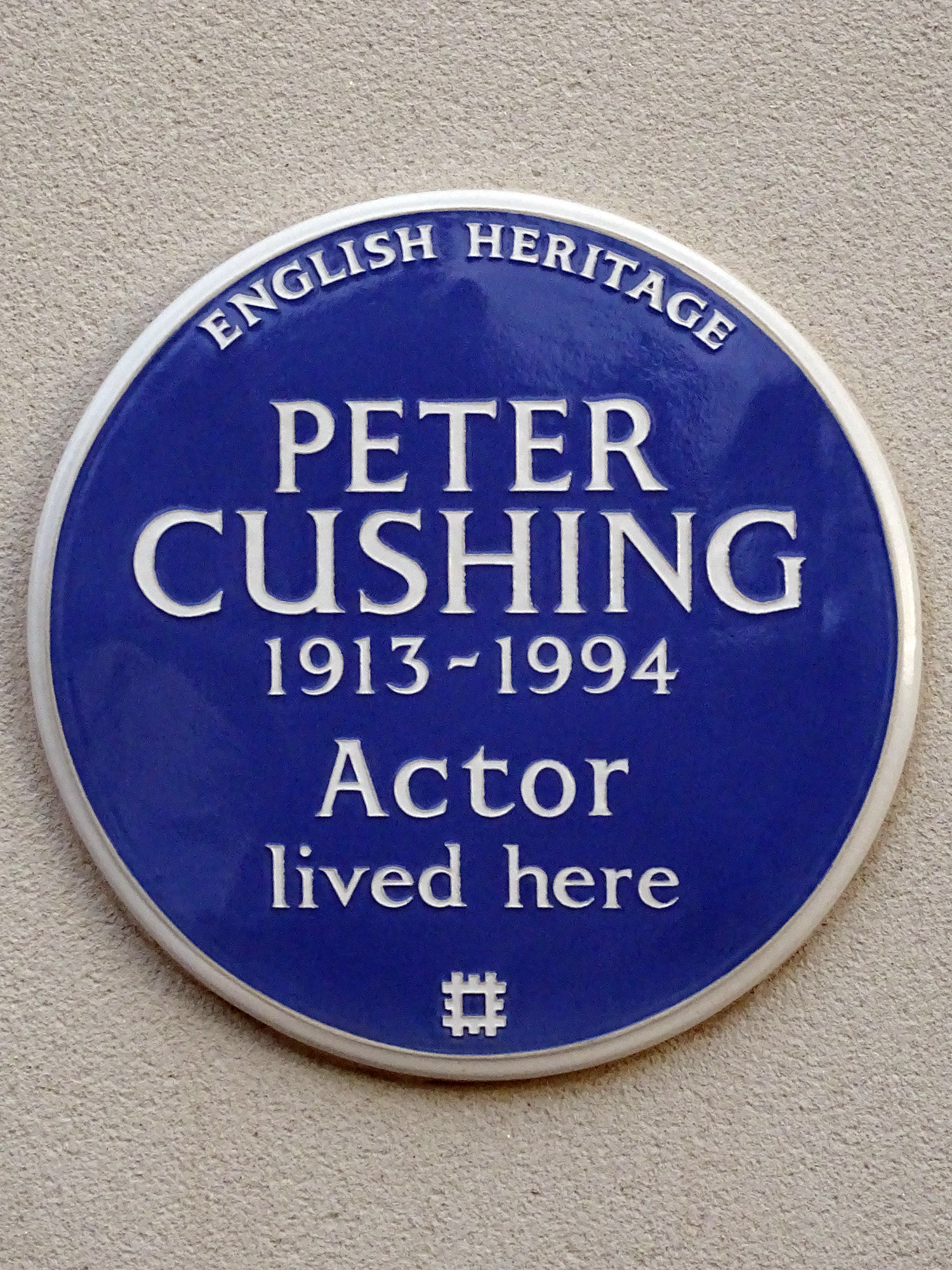
English Heritage blue plaque at 32 St James' Road, Purley, London

The Cushing family lived in Dulwich during the First World War, but moved to Purley after the war ended in 1918. Although raised during wartime, Cushing was too young to understand or become greatly affected by it, and was shielded from the horrors of war by his mother, who encouraged him to play games under the kitchen table whenever the threat of possible bombings arose. In his infancy, Cushing twice developed pneumonia and once what was then known as "double pneumonia". The latter was often fatal during that period, although he survived. During one Christmas in his youth, Cushing saw a stage production of Peter Pan, which served as an early source of inspiration and interest in acting. Cushing loved dressing up and make believe from an early age, and later claimed he always wanted to be an actor, "perhaps without knowing at first." A fan of comics and toy collectibles in his youth, Cushing earned money by staging puppet shows for family members with his glove-puppets and toys.

He began his early education in Dulwich, south London, before attending Shoreham Grammar School in Shoreham-by-Sea, on the Sussex coast between Brighton and Worthing. Prone to homesickness, he was miserable at the boarding school and spent only one term there before returning home. He attended Purley County Grammar School, where he swam and played cricket and rugby. With the exception of art, Cushing was a self-proclaimed poor student in most subjects and had little attention span for that which did not interest him. He got fair grades only through the help of his brother, a strong student who did his homework for him. Cushing harboured aspirations for the arts all throughout his youth, especially acting. His childhood inspiration was Tom Mix, an American film actor and star of many Western films. D.J. Davies, the Purley County Grammar School physics teacher who produced all the school's plays, recognised some acting potential in him and encouraged him to participate in the theatre, even allowing Cushing to skip class to paint sets. He played the lead in nearly every school production during his teenage years, including the role of Sir Anthony Absolute in a 1929 staging of Richard Brinsley Sheridan's comedy of manners play, The Rivals.

Cushing wanted to enter the acting profession after school, but his father opposed the idea, despite the theatrical background of several of his family members. Instead, seizing upon Cushing's interest in art and drawing, he got his son a job as a surveyor's assistant in the drawing department of the Coulsdon and Purley Urban District Council's surveyor's office during the summer of 1933. Cushing hated the job, where he remained for three years without promotion or advancement due to his lack of ambition in the profession. The only enjoyment he got out of it was drawing perspectives of proposed buildings, which were almost always rejected because they were too imaginative and expensive and lacked strong foundations, which Cushing disregarded as a "mere detail."

Thanks to his former teacher Davies, Cushing continued to appear in school productions during this time, as well as amateur plays such as W. S. Gilbert's Pygmalion and Galatea, George Kelly's The Torch-Bearers, and The Red Umbrella, by Brenda Girvin and Monica Cosens. Cushing often learned and practised his lines in an attic at work, under the guise that he was putting ordnance survey maps into order. He regularly applied for auditions and openings for roles he found in the arts-oriented newspaper The Stage, but was turned down repeatedly due to his lack of professional experience in the theatre.

== Career ==
=== Early films and acting ===
Cushing eventually applied for a scholarship at the Guildhall School of Music and Drama in London. His first audition was before the actor Allan Aynesworth, who was so unimpressed with Cushing's manner of speech that he rejected him outright and insisted he not return until he improved his diction. Cushing continued to pursue a scholarship, writing twenty-one letters to the school, until the actor and theatre-manager Bill Fraser finally agreed to meet Cushing in 1935 simply so he could ask him in person to stop writing. During that meeting, Cushing was given a walk-on part as a courier in that night's production of J. B. Priestley's Cornelius. This marked his professional stage debut, although he had no lines and did little more than stand on stage behind other actors. Afterward, he was granted the scholarship and given odd jobs around the theatre, such as selling refreshments and working as an assistant stage manager.

One of his earliest professional stage performances was in 1935 as Captain Randall in Ian Hay's The Middle Watch at the Connaught Theatre in Worthing. By the end of the summer of 1936, Cushing accepted a job with the repertory theatre company Southampton Rep, working as assistant stage manager and performing in bit roles at the Grand Theatre in the Hampshire city. He spent the next three years in an apprenticeship at Southampton Rep., auditioning for character roles both there and in other surrounding theatres, eventually amassing almost 100 individual parts. While he was in Southampton, he met an 18-year-old fellow actor, Doreen Lawrence, and they were engaged to be married. Lawrence broke off the engagement, citing his frequent crying and bringing his parents on dates.

Soon, he felt the urge to pursue a film career in the United States. In 1939, his father bought him a one-way ticket to Hollywood, where he moved with only £50 to his name. Cushing met a Columbia Pictures employee named Larry Goodkind, who wrote him a letter of recommendation and directed him to acquaintances Goodkind knew at the company Edward Small Productions. Cushing visited the company, which was only a few days away from shooting The Man in the Iron Mask (1939), the James Whale-directed adaptation of the Alexandre Dumas tale based on the French legend of a prisoner during the reign of Louis XIV. Cushing was hired as a stand-in for scenes that featured both characters played by Louis Hayward, who had the dual lead roles of King Louis XIV and Philippe of Gascony. Cushing played one part against Hayward in one scene, then the opposite part in another, and ultimately the scenes were spliced together in a split screen process that featured Hayward in both parts and left Cushing's work cut from the film altogether. Although the job meant Cushing received no actual screen time, he was eventually cast in a bit part as the king's messenger, which made The Man in the Iron Mask his official film debut. The small role involved sword-fighting and, although Cushing had no experience with fencing, he told Whale he was an excellent fencer to ensure he got the part. Cushing later said his unscreened scenes alongside Hayward were terrible performances, but that his experience on the film provided an excellent opportunity to learn and observe how filming on a studio set worked.

Only a few days after filming on The Man in the Iron Mask was completed, Cushing was in the Schwab's Drug Store, a famous Sunset Boulevard hangout spot for actors, when he learned producer Hal Roach was seeking an English actor for a comedy film starring Laurel and Hardy. Cushing sought and was cast in the role. Cushing appeared only briefly in A Chump at Oxford (1940) and his scenes took just one week to film, but he was proud to work with whom he called "two of the greatest comedians the cinema has ever produced." Around this time the actor Robert Coote, who met Cushing during a cricket game, recommended to the director George Stevens that Cushing might be good for a part in Stevens' upcoming film Vigil in the Night (1940). Adapted from a serial novella of the same name, it was a drama film about a nurse played by Carole Lombard working in a poorly equipped country hospital. Stevens cast Cushing in the second male lead role of Joe Shand, the husband of the Lombard character's sister. Shooting ran from September to November 1939, and the film was released in 1940, drawing Cushing's first semblance of attention and critical praise.

Cushing continued to work in a few Hollywood engagements, including an uncredited role in the war film They Dare Not Love (1941), which reunited him with director James Whale. Cushing was cast (again uncredited) in one of a series of short films in an entry in the MGM series The Passing Parade, which focused on strange-but-true historical events. He appeared in the episode The Hidden Master (1940) as a young Clive of India, well before the soldier established the military and political supremacy of the East India Company. In the film, Clive tries to shoot himself twice but the gun misfires, then he fires a third time at a pitcher of water and the gun works perfectly. Clive takes this to be an omen that he should live, and he goes on to perform great feats in his life. Studio executives were pleased with Cushing's performance, and there was talk among Hollywood insiders grooming him for stardom. Despite the promise, however, Cushing grew homesick and decided he wished to return to England. He moved to New York City in anticipation of his eventual return home, during which time he voiced a few radio commercials and joined a summer stock theatre company to raise money for his voyage back to England. He performed in such plays as Robert E. Sherwood's The Petrified Forest, Arnold Ridley's The Ghost Train, S. N. Behrman's Biography and a modern dress version of William Shakespeare's Macbeth. He was eventually noticed by a Broadway theatre talent scout, and in 1941 he made his Broadway debut in the religious wartime drama The Seventh Trumpet. It received poor reviews, however, and ran for only eleven days.

=== Return to England and theatrical work ===
Cushing returned to England during the Second World War. Although some childhood injuries prevented him from serving on active duty, a friend suggested he entertain the troops by performing as part of the Entertainments National Service Association. In 1942, the Noël Coward play Private Lives was touring the military stations and hospitals in the British Isles, and the actor playing the lead role of Elyot Chase was called to service. Cushing agreed to take his place with very little notice or time to prepare, and earned a salary of ten pounds a week for the job. During this tour he met Violet Hélène "Helen" Beck, a former dancer who was starring in the lead female role of Amanda Prynne. They fell in love and were married on 10 April 1943. Cushing eventually had to leave ENSA due to lung congestion, an ailment his wife helped him recover from. The two had little money around this time, and Cushing had to collect from both National Assistance and the Actors' Benevolent Fund. Cushing struggled to find work during this period, with some plays he was cast in failing to even make it past rehearsals into theatres. Others closed after a few showings, like an ambitious five-hour stage adaptation of Leo Tolstoy's novel War and Peace that opened and closed in 1943 at the Phoenix Theatre in London.

Cushing recorded occasional radio spots and appeared in week-long stints as a featured player at the Q Theatre, but otherwise work was difficult to come by. He found a modest success in a 1945 production of Sheridan's The Rivals at Westminster's Criterion Theatre, which earned him enough money to pay off some growing debts. The war years continued to prove difficult for him, however, and at one point he was forced to work designing ladies' headscarves at a Macclesfield-based silk manufacturer to make ends meet. In the autumn of 1946, after the war ended, Cushing unsuccessfully auditioned for the part of Paul Verrall in a stage production of the play Born Yesterday that was being staged by the famed actor and director Laurence Olivier. He was not cast because he insisted he could not perform in an American accent. After Cushing attempted the accent and failed, Olivier replied, "Well, I appreciate you not wasting my time. I shall remember you." Nearing middle age and finding it increasingly harder to make a living in acting, Cushing began to consider himself a failure.

In 1947, when Olivier sought him out for his film adaptation of Hamlet, Cushing's wife Helen pushed him to pursue a role. Far from being deterred by Cushing's unsuccessful audition the year before, Olivier remembered the actor well and was happy to cast him, but the only character left unfilled was the relatively small part of the foppish courtier Osric. Cushing accepted the role, and Hamlet (1948) marked his British film debut. One of Cushing's primary scenes involved Osric talking to Hamlet and Horatio while walking down a wide stone spiral stairway. The set provided technical difficulties, and all of Cushing's lines had to be post-synched. Cushing had recently undergone dental surgery and he was trying not to open his mouth widely for fear of spitting. When this hindered the post-synching process, Olivier leaned in close to Cushing's face and said, "Now drown me. It'll be a glorious death, so long as I can hear what you're saying."

Hamlet won the Academy Award for Best Picture, and earned Cushing praise for his performance. Also appearing in the film was Christopher Lee, who eventually became a close friend and frequent co-star with Cushing. Cushing designed custom hand-scarves in honour of the Hamlet film, and as it was being exhibited across England, the scarves were eventually accepted as gifts by the Queen and her daughter Princess Elizabeth. After Hamlet, both Peter and Helen Cushing accepted a personal invitation from Olivier to join Old Vic, Olivier's repertory theatre company, which embarked on a year-long tour of Australasia. The tour, which lasted until February 1949, took them to Melbourne, Sydney, Brisbane, Hobart, Tasmania, Auckland, Wellington, Christchurch and Dunedin, and included performances of Richard Brinsley Sheridan's The School for Scandal, Shakespeare's Richard III, Thornton Wilder's The Skin of Our Teeth, Jean Anouilh's Antigone and Anton Chekhov's The Proposal.

=== Success in television and major films ===
Cushing struggled greatly to find work over the next few years, and became so stressed that he felt he was suffering from an extended nervous breakdown. Nevertheless, he continued to appear in several small roles in radio, theatre and film. Among them was the John Huston film Moulin Rouge (1952) in which he played a racing spectator named Marcel de la Voisier appearing with José Ferrer, who played the artist Henri de Toulouse-Lautrec. During this discouraging period for Cushing, his wife encouraged him to seek roles in television, which was beginning to develop in England. She suggested he should write to all the producers listed in the Radio Times magazine seeking work in the medium. The move proved to be a wise one, as Cushing was hired to complement the cast of a string of major theatre successes that were being adapted to live television. The first was J.B. Priestley's Eden End, which was televised in December 1951. Over the next three years, he became one of the most active and favoured names in British television, and was considered a pioneer in British television drama.

He earned praise for playing the lead male role of Mr. Darcy in an early BBC Television serialisation of Jane Austen's Pride and Prejudice (1952). Other successful television ventures during this time included Epitaph for a Spy (1953), The Noble Spaniard, Beau Brummell, Portrait by Peko, and Anastasia, the latter of which won Cushing the Daily Mail National Television Award for Best Actor of 1953–54. His largest television success from this period was the leading role of Winston Smith in Nineteen Eighty-Four, (1954) an adaptation by Nigel Kneale of George Orwell's novel of the same name about a totalitarian regime. The production proved to be controversial, resulting in death threats for the director Rudolph Cartier and causing Cushing to be vilified for appearing in such "filth." Parliament even considered a motion immediately after the first screening to ban the play's live repeat. Nevertheless, a second televised production was filmed and aired, and Cushing eventually drew both critical praise and acting awards, further cementing his reputation as one of Britain's biggest television stars. Cushing felt his first performance was much stronger than the second, but the second production is the only known surviving version.

In the two years following Nineteen Eighty-Four, Cushing appeared in thirty-one television plays and two serials, and won Best Television Actor of the Year from the Evening Chronicle. He also won best actor awards from the Guild of Television Producers in 1955, and from the British Academy of Film and Television Arts in 1956. Among the plays he appeared in during this time were Terence Rattigan's The Browning Version, Gordon Daviot's Richard of Bordeaux, and the production of Nigel Kneale's The Creature (1955), the latter of which Cushing starred in film adaptation released in 1957. Despite this continued success in live television, Cushing found the medium too stressful and wished to return to film. Cinematic roles proved somewhat difficult to find, however, as film producers were often resentful of television stars for drawing audiences away from the cinema.

Nevertheless, he continued to work in some film roles during this period, including the adventure film The Black Knight (1954) opposite Alan Ladd. For that film, he travelled to Spain and filmed scenes on location in the castles of Manzanares el Real and El Escorial. He also starred in the film adaptation of the Graham Greene novel The End of the Affair (1955) as Henry Miles, an important civil servant and the cuckolded husband of Sarah Miles, played by Deborah Kerr. Also around the same time, he appeared in Magic Fire (also 1955), an autobiographical film about the German composer Richard Wagner. Filmed on location in Munich, Cushing played Otto Wesendonck, the husband of the poet Mathilde Wesendonck, who in the film is portrayed as having an affair with Wagner.

=== Hammer Frankenstein films ===
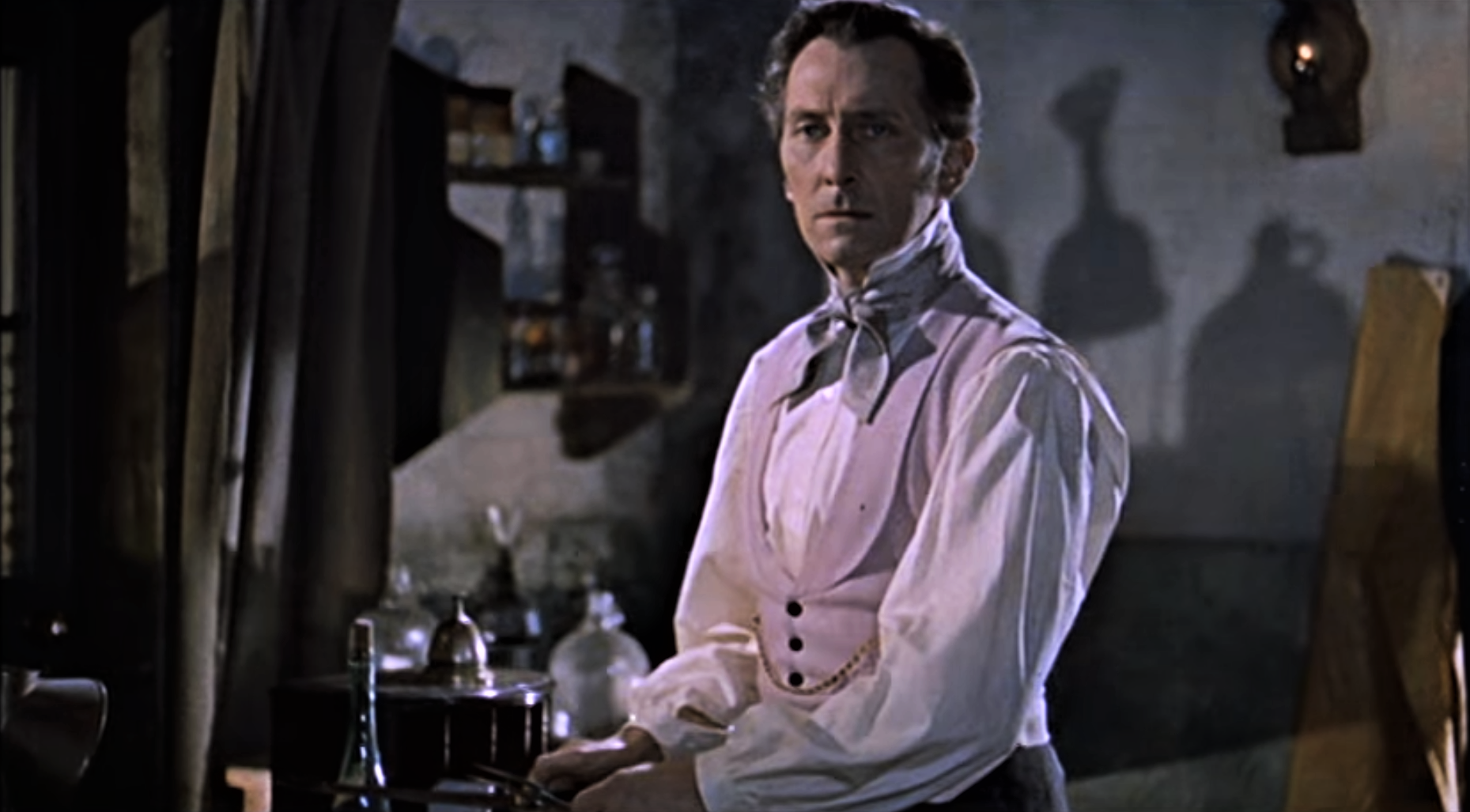
As Victor Frankenstein in The Revenge of Frankenstein

During a brief quiet period following Cushing's television work, he read in trade publications about Hammer, a low-budget production company seeking to adapt Mary Shelley's horror novel Frankenstein into a new film. Cushing, who enjoyed the tale as a child, had his agent John Redway inform the company of Cushing's interest in playing the protagonist, Baron Victor Frankenstein. The studio executives were anxious to have Cushing; in fact, the Hammer co-founder James Carreras had been unsuccessfully courting Cushing for film roles in other projects even before his major success with Nineteen Eighty-Four. Cushing was about twenty years older than Baron Frankenstein as he appeared in the original novel, but that did not deter the filmmakers. Cushing was cast in the lead role of The Curse of Frankenstein (1957), marking the first of twenty-two films he made for Hammer. He later said that his career decisions entailed selecting roles where he knew that he would be accepted by the audience. "Who wants to see me as Hamlet? Very few. But millions want to see me as [Baron] Frankenstein, so that's the one I do." The film critic Roger Ebert described Cushing's work in the Hammer films: "[Cushing is] the one in all those British horror films, standing between Vincent Price and Christopher Lee. His dialog usually runs along the lines of, 'But good heavens, man! The person you saw has been dead for more than two centuries!'"

Unlike the 1931 Frankenstein produced by Universal, the Hammer films revolved mainly around Victor Frankenstein, rather than his monster. The screenwriter Jimmy Sangster wrote the protagonist as an ambitious, egotistical and coldly intellectual scientist who despised his contemporaries. Unlike the character from the novel and past film versions, Cushing's Baron Frankenstein commits vicious crimes to attain his goals, including the murder of a colleague to obtain a brain for his creature. The Curse of Frankenstein also featured Christopher Lee, who played Frankenstein's monster. Cushing and Lee became extremely close friends, and remained so for the rest of Cushing's life. They first met on the set of the film, where Lee was still wearing the monster make-up prepared by Phil Leakey. Hammer Studios' publicity department put out a story that when Cushing first encountered Lee without the make-up on, he screamed in terror.

Cushing so valued preparation for his role that he insisted on being trained by a surgeon to learn how to wield a scalpel authentically. Shot in dynamic colour with a £65,000-budget, the film became known for its heavy usage of gore and sexual content. As a result, while the film did well at the box-office with its target audience, it drew mixed to negative reviews from the critics. Most, however, were complimentary of Cushing's performance, claiming it added a layer of distinction and credibility to the film. Many felt Cushing's performance helped create the archetypal mad scientist character. The Picturegoer writer Margaret Hinxman, who was not complimentary of Lee's performance, praised Cushing and wrote of the film: "Although this shocker may not have created much of a monster, it may well have created something more lasting: a star!" Donald F. Glut, a writer and filmmaker who wrote a book about the portrayals of Frankenstein, said the inner warmth of Cushing's off-screen personality was apparent on-screen even despite the horrific elements of Frankenstein, which helped to add a layer of likability.

The Curse of Frankenstein was an overnight success, bringing both Cushing and Lee worldwide fame. The two men continued to work together in many films for Hammer, and their names became synonymous with the company. Cushing reprised the role of Baron Victor Frankenstein in five sequels. In the first, The Revenge of Frankenstein (1958), his protagonist is sentenced to death by guillotine, but he flees and hides under the alias Doctor Victor Stein. He returned for The Evil of Frankenstein (1963), where the Baron has a carnival hypnotist resurrect his monster's inactive brain, and Frankenstein Created Woman (1967), in which the Frankenstein's monster is a woman played by the Playboy magazine centrefold model Susan Denberg. Cushing played the lead role twice more in Frankenstein Must Be Destroyed (1969) and Frankenstein and the Monster from Hell (1974). The former film portrays Frankenstein as a far more ruthless character than had been seen before, and features a scene in which Cushing's Frankenstein rapes the character played by Veronica Carlson. Neither Carlson nor Cushing wanted to do the scene, filmed despite the director Terence Fisher's objections, and the controversial sequence was edited out of the film for its American release. In Frankenstein and the Monster from Hell, Cushing portrayed Frankenstein as having gone completely mad, in a fitting coda to the earlier films.

=== Hammer Dracula films ===
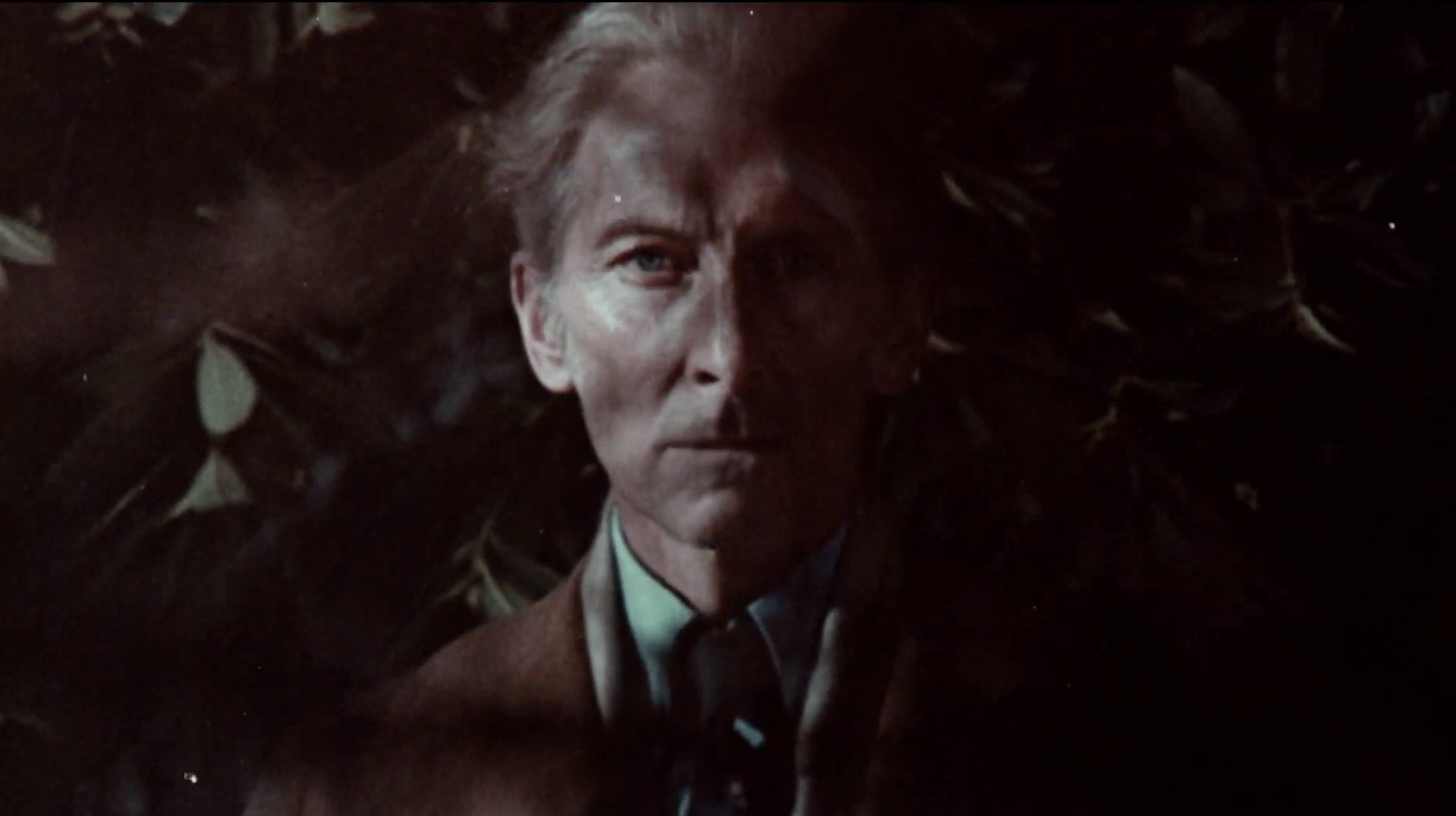
Cushing as Doctor Van Helsing

When Hammer sought to adapt Bram Stoker's classic vampire novel Dracula, they cast Cushing to play the vampire's adversary Doctor Van Helsing. Cushing envisioned the character as an idealist warrior for the greater good, and studied the original book carefully and adapted several of Van Helsing's characteristics from the books into his performance, including the repeated gesture of raising his index finger to emphasise an important point. Cushing said one of the biggest challenges during filming was not missing whenever he struck a prop stake with a mallet and drove it into a vampire's heart. Dracula was released in 1958, with Cushing once again starring opposite Lee, who played the title character, although Cushing was given top billing. During filming, Cushing himself suggested the staging for the final confrontation scene, in which Van Helsing leaps onto a large library table, opens window curtains to weaken Dracula with sunlight, then uses two candlesticks as a makeshift crucifix to drive the vampire into the sunlight. As with the Frankenstein film, critics largely disliked Dracula because of its violence and sexual content, deeming it inferior to the 1931 Universal version.

In 1959, Cushing agreed to reprise the role of Van Helsing in the sequel, The Brides of Dracula (1960). Before filming began, however, Cushing said he had reservations about the screenplay written by Jimmy Sangster and Peter Bryan. As a result, the playwright Edward Percy was brought in to make modifications to the script, though the rewrites pushed filming into early 1960 and brought additional costs to the production. For the sequel, Dracula: Prince of Darkness (1966), which marked Lee's return to the title role for the first time since 1958, Cushing granted permission for archival footage featuring him to be used in the opening scene, a reprisal of the climax from the first Dracula film. In exchange, Hammer's James Carreras thanked Cushing by paying for extensive roofing repair work that had recently been done on Cushing's recently purchased Whitstable home. Cushing appeared in Dracula A.D. 1972 (1972), a Hammer modernisation of the Dracula story set in the then-present day. Lee once again starred as Dracula. In the opening scene Cushing portrays the nineteenth century Van Helsing as he did in the previous films, and the character is killed after battling Dracula. Thereafter the action jumps ahead to 1972, and Cushing plays the original character's grandson for the bulk of the movie. Cushing performed many of his own stunts in Dracula A.D. 1972, which included tumbling off a haywagon during a fight with Dracula. Christopher Neame, who also starred in the film, said he was particularly impressed with Cushing's agility and fitness, considering his age. Cushing and Lee both reprised their respective roles in the sequel The Satanic Rites of Dracula (1974), which was known in the United States as Count Dracula and his Vampire Bride. Around the same time, Cushing played the original nineteenth-century Van Helsing in The Legend of the 7 Golden Vampires (also 1974), a co-production between Hammer Studios and the Shaw Brothers Studio, which brought Chinese martial arts into the Dracula story. In that film, Cushing's Van Helsing travels to the Chinese city Chongqing, where Count Dracula is heading a vampire cult.

=== Other Hammer roles ===
Although most well known for his roles in the Frankenstein and Dracula films, Cushing appeared in a wide variety of other Hammer productions during this time. Both he and his wife feared that he would become typecast into horror roles, but he continued to take them because they guaranteed regular work. He appeared in the horror film The Abominable Snowman (1957), a Hammer adaptation of a BBC Nigel Kneale television play The Creature (1955) which Cushing had also starred in. He portrayed an English botanist searching the Himalayas for the legendary Yeti. The director Val Guest said he was particularly impressed with Cushing's preparation and ability to plan which props to best use to enhance his performance, so much so that Cushing started to become known as "Props Peter". Cushing and Lee appeared together in the Hammer horror The Mummy (1959), with Cushing as the archaeologist John Banning and Lee as the antagonist Kharis. Cushing saw a promotional poster for The Mummy that showed Lee's character with a large hole in his chest, allowing a beam of light to pass through his body. There was no reference to such an injury in the film script, and when he asked the publicity department why it was on the poster, they said it was simply meant to serve as a shocking promotional image. During filming, he asked the director Terence Fisher for permission to drive a harpoon through the mummy's body during a fight scene to explain the poster image. Fisher agreed, and the scene was used in the film.

Around the same time, he portrayed the detective Sherlock Holmes in the Hammer production of The Hound of the Baskervilles (also 1959), an adaptation of Sir Arthur Conan Doyle's novel of the same name. He again co-starred opposite Lee, who portrayed the aristocratic Sir Henry Baskerville. A fan of Sherlock Holmes, Cushing was highly anxious to play the character, and reread the novels in anticipation of the role. Hammer decided to heighten the source novel's horror elements, which upset the estate of Conan Doyle, but Cushing himself voiced no objection to the creative licence because he felt the character of Holmes himself remained intact. However, when the producer Anthony Hinds proposed removing the character's deerstalker, Cushing insisted they should remain because audiences associated Holmes with his headgear and pipes. He prepared extensively for the role, studying the novel and taking notes in his script. He scrutinised the costumes and screenwriter Peter Bryan's script, often altering words or phrases. Lee later claimed to be awestruck by Cushing's ability to incorporate many different props and actions into his performance simultaneously, whether reading, smoking a pipe, drinking whiskey, filing through papers, or other things while portraying Holmes. In later years, Cushing considered his Holmes performance one of the finest accomplishments of his career. He drew generally mixed reviews: Film Daily called it a "tantalising performance" and Time Out's David Pirie called it "one of his very best performances", while the Monthly Film Bulletin called him "tiresomely mannered and too lightweight" and BBC Television's Barry Norman said he "didn't quite capture the air of know-all arrogance that was the great detective's hallmark". The Hound of the Baskervilles was originally conceived as the first in a series of Sherlock Holmes films, but no sequels were made.

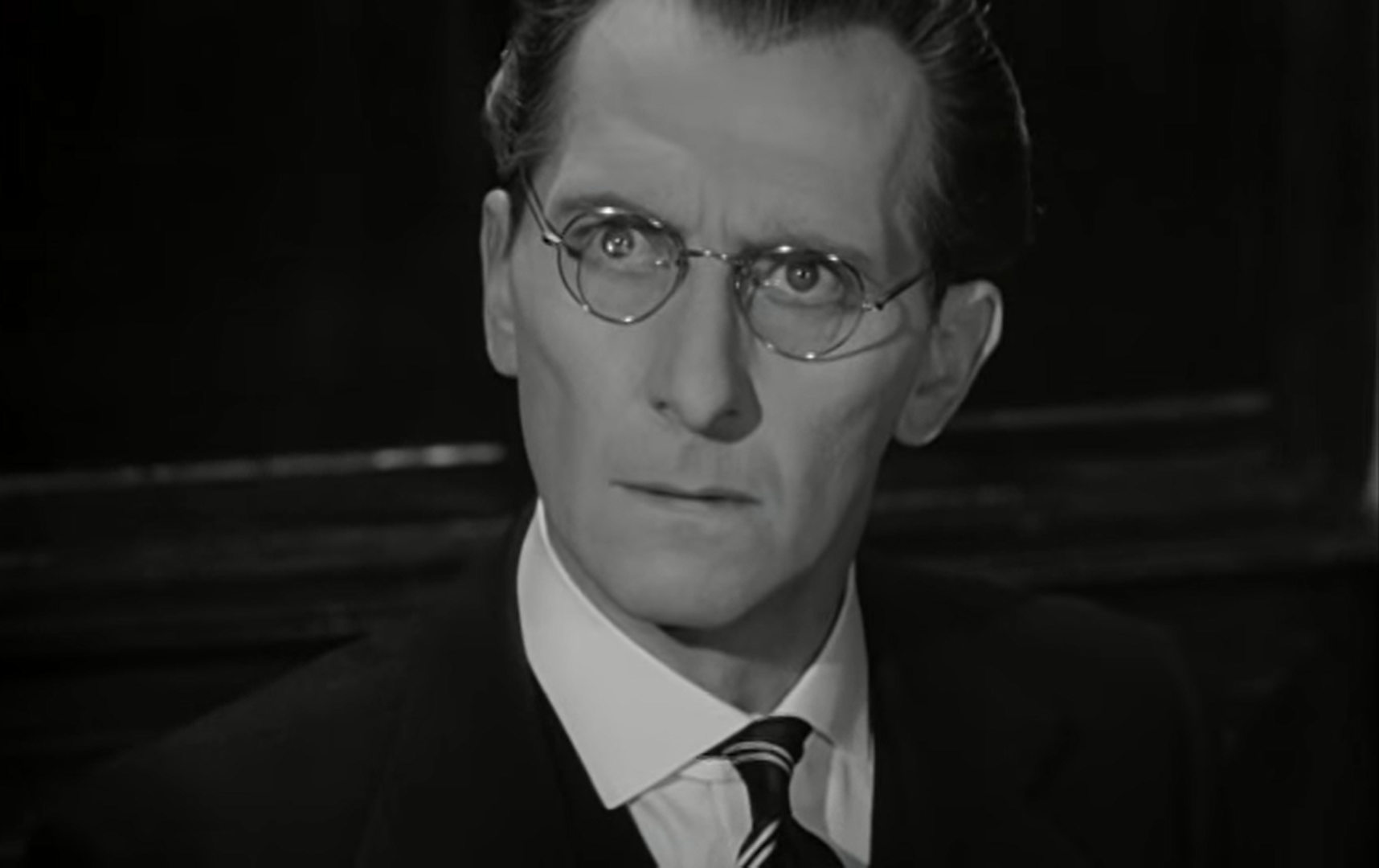
Cushing in Cash on Demand (1961)

Immediately upon completion of The Hound of the Baskervilles, Cushing was offered the lead role in the Hammer film The Man Who Could Cheat Death (1959), a remake of The Man in Half Moon Street (1945). He turned it down, in part because he did not like the script by Jimmy Sangster, and the lead role was taken instead by Anton Diffring. Cushing next appeared for Hammer when he played the Sheriff of Nottingham in the adventure film Sword of Sherwood Forest (1960), which starred Richard Greene as the outlaw Robin Hood. It was filmed on location in County Wicklow in the Republic of Ireland. The next year, Cushing starred as an Ebenezer Scrooge-like manager of a bank being robbed in the Hammer thriller film Cash on Demand (1961). He considered this among the favourites of his films, and some critics believed it to be among his best performances, although it was one of the least-seen films from his career. He appeared in the Hammer film Captain Clegg (1962), known in the United States as Night Creatures. Cushing starred as Parson Blyss, the local reverend of an 18th-century English coastal town believed to be hiding his smuggling activities with reports of ghosts. The film was roughly based on the Doctor Syn novels by Russell Thorndike. Cushing read Thorndike to prepare for the role and made suggestions to the makeup artist Roy Ashton about Blyss' costume and hairstyle. He and the director Peter Graham Scott did not get along well during filming and at one point, when the two were having a disagreement on set, Cushing turned to a cameraman named Len Harris and said, "Take no notice, Len. We've done enough of these now to know what we're doing."

Cushing and Lee appeared together in the horror film The Gorgon (1964) about the female snake-haired Gorgon character from Greek mythology and in She (1965), about a lost realm ruled by the immortal queen Ayesha, played by Ursula Andress. Cushing later appeared in The Vampire Lovers (1970), an erotic Hammer horror film about a lesbian vampire, adapted in part from the Sheridan Le Fanu novella Carmilla. The next year he was set to star in a sequel, Lust for a Vampire (1971), but had to drop out because his wife was ill and Ralph Bates substituted. However, Cushing was able to star in Twins of Evil (also 1971), a prequel of sorts to The Vampire Lovers, as Gustav Weil, the leader of a group of religious puritans trying to stamp out witchcraft and satanism. Among his final Hammer roles was Fear in the Night (1972), where he played a one-armed school headmaster apparently terrorising the protagonist, played by Judy Geeson.

=== Non-Hammer film work ===
Although best known for his Hammer performances from the 1950s to the 1970s, Cushing worked in a variety of other roles during this time, and actively sought roles outside the horror genre to diversify his work. In an interview published in ABC Film Review in November 1964, Cushing stated, "People look at me as if I were some sort of monster, but I can't think why. In my macabre pictures, I have either been a monster-maker or a monster-destroyer, but never a monster. Actually, I'm a gentle fellow. Never harmed a fly. I love animals, and when I'm in the country I'm a keen bird-watcher." In an interview published in 1966, he added, "I do get terribly tired with the neighbourhood kids telling me 'My mum says she wouldn't want to meet you in a dark alley'." He continued to perform in occasional stage productions, such as Robert E. MacEnroe's The Silver Whistle at Westminster's Duchess Theatre in 1956. Around the same time he appeared in the film Alexander the Great (1956) as the Athenian General Memnon of Rhodes. In 1959 Cushing originally planned to appear in the lead role of William Fairchild's play The Sound of Murder, while shooting a film at the same time. The hectic schedule became overbearing for Cushing, who had to drop out of the play and resolved to never again attempt a film and play simultaneously.

He appeared in the biographical epic film John Paul Jones (1959), in which Robert Stack played the title role of the American naval fighter in the American Revolutionary War. Cushing became very ill with dysentery during filming and lost a considerable amount of weight as a result. Cushing played Robert Knox in The Flesh and the Fiends (1960), based on the true story of the doctor who purchased human corpses for research from the serial killer duo Burke and Hare. Cushing had previously stated Knox was one of his role models in developing his portrayal of Baron Frankenstein. The film was called Mania in its American release. Cushing appeared in several films released in 1961, including Fury at Smugglers' Bay, an adventure film about pirates scavenging ships off the English coastline; The Hellfire Club, where he played a lawyer helping a young man expose a cult; and The Naked Edge, a British-American thriller about a woman who suspects her husband framed another man for murder. The latter film starred Deborah Kerr, Cushing's co-star from The End of the Affair, and Gary Cooper, one of Cushing's favourite actors. In 1965 Cushing appeared in the Ben Travers farce play Thark at Garrick Theatre in Westminster. It was his final stage performance for a decade, but he continued to stay active in film and television during this period.

Cushing took the lead role in two science fiction films by AARU Productions based on the British television series Doctor Who. Although Cushing's protagonist was derived from television scripts used for First Doctor serials, his portrayal of the character differed in the fact that Cushing's Dr. Who was a human being, whereas the original Doctor as portrayed on TV by William Hartnell was extraterrestrial. Cushing played the role in Dr. Who and the Daleks (1965) and Daleks' Invasion Earth 2150 A.D. (1966).

Cushing later starred in the fifteen-episode BBC television series Sherlock Holmes, once again reprising his role as the title character with Nigel Stock as Watson, though only six episodes now survive. The episodes aired in 1968. Douglas Wilmer had previously played Holmes for the BBC, but he turned down the part in this series due to the extremely demanding filming schedule. Fourteen days of rehearsal was originally scheduled for each episode, but they were cut down to ten days for economic reasons. Many actors turned down the role as a result, but Cushing accepted, and the BBC believed his Hammer Studios persona would bring what they called a sense of "lurking horror and callous savagery" to the series. Production lasted from May to December, and Cushing adopted a strict regimen of training, preparation and exercise. He tried to keep his performance identical to his portrayal of Holmes from The Hound of the Baskervilles. Although the series proved popular, Cushing felt he could not give his best performance under the hectic schedule, and he was not pleased with the final result.

Cushing appeared in a handful of horror films by the independent Amicus Productions, including Dr. Terror's House of Horrors (1965), as a man who could see into the future using Tarot cards; The Skull (1965), as a professor who became possessed by a spiritual force embodied within a skull; and Torture Garden (1967), as a collector of Edgar Allan Poe relics who is robbed and murdered by a rival. Cushing also appeared in non-Amicus horror films like Island of Terror (1966) and The Blood Beast Terror (1968), in both of which he investigates a series of mysterious deaths. He appeared in Corruption (1968), a film that was billed as so horrific that "no woman will be admitted alone" into theatres to see it. Cushing played a surgeon who attempts to restore the beauty of his wife (played by Sue Lloyd), whose face is horribly scarred in an accident.

In July 1969, Cushing appeared as the straight man in the sketch comedy series The Morecambe & Wise Show. In the skit, Cushing portrayed King Arthur, while the other two gave comedic portrayals of characters like Merlin and the knights of the Round Table. Cushing continued to make occasional cameos in the series over the next decade, portraying himself desperately attempting to collect a payment for his previous acting appearance on the show. Cushing and Lee made cameos as their old roles of Frankenstein and Dracula in the comedy One More Time (1970), which starred Peter Lawford and Sammy Davis Jr. The single scene took only one morning of filming, which Cushing agreed to after Davis asked him to do it as a favour. The next year Cushing appeared in I, Monster (1971), which was adapted from Robert Louis Stevenson's Strange Case of Dr Jekyll and Mr Hyde, alongside Lee as the Jekyll/Hyde figure. Later that year he was set to appear in Blood from the Mummy's Tomb (1971), an adaptation of the Bram Stoker novel The Jewel of Seven Stars. He was forced to withdraw from the film to care for his wife, and was ultimately replaced by Andrew Keir.

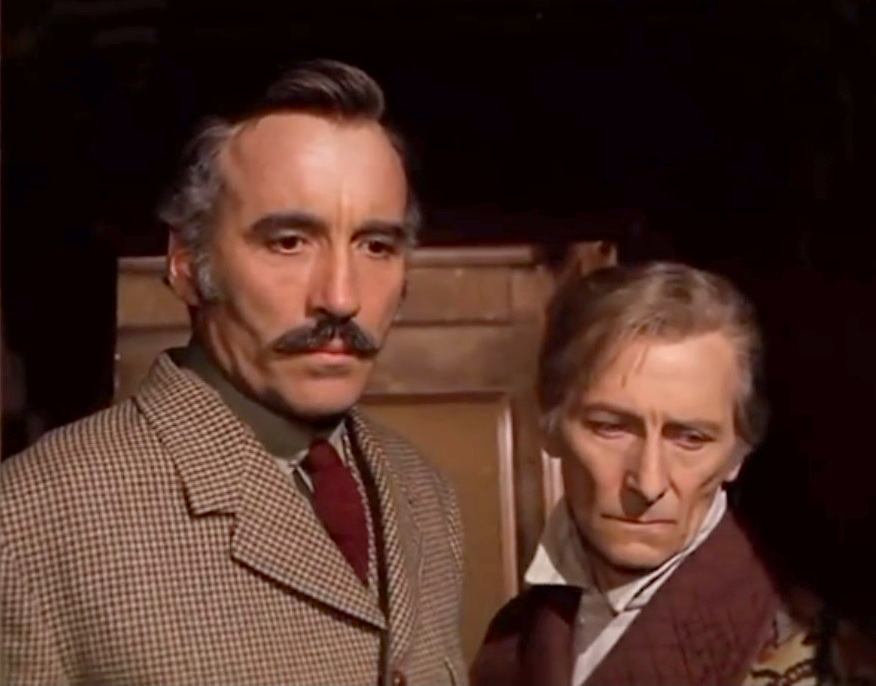
Cushing and his close friend Christopher Lee in Horror Express (1972). They starred in twenty-two films together, including three Dracula Hammer films.

In 1971, Cushing contacted the Royal National Institute for the Blind and offered to provide voice acting for some of their audiobooks. They immediately accepted, and among the works Cushing recorded was The Return of Sherlock Holmes, a collection of thirteen one-hour stories. He appeared alongside Vincent Price in Dr. Phibes Rises Again! (1972), a sequel to The Abominable Dr. Phibes, and then co-starred with Price again in the film Madhouse (1974). He once again starred with his longtime collaborator Christopher Lee in Horror Express (1972). Cushing continued to appear in several Amicus Productions films during this period, including Tales from the Crypt (1972), From Beyond the Grave (1973), And Now the Screaming Starts! (1973) and The Beast Must Die (1974).

For Tales from the Crypt, an anthology film made up of several horror segments, Cushing was offered the part of a ruthless businessman but did not like the part and turned down the role. Instead, Cushing asked to play Arthur Grymsdyke, a kind, working-class widower who gets along well with the local children, but falls subject to a smear campaign by his snobbish neighbours. Eventually, the character is driven to commit suicide, but returns from the grave to seek revenge against his tormentors. After Cushing was cast in the role, several changes were made to the script at his suggestion. Originally, all of the character's lines were spoken aloud to himself, but Cushing suggested he should speak to a framed photograph of his deceased wife instead, and the director, Freddie Francis, agreed. Cushing used the emotions from the recent loss of his wife to add authenticity to the widower character's grieving. The makeup artist Roy Ashton designed the costume and makeup Cushing wore when he rose from the dead, but Cushing helped Ashton to develop the costume, and donned a pair of false teeth that he previously used in a disguise during the Sherlock Holmes television series. His performance in Tales from the Crypt won him the Best Male Actor award at the 1971 French Convention of Fantasy Cinema in France.

In 1975, Cushing was anxious to return to the stage, where he had not performed in ten years. Around this time he learned that Helen Ryan, an actress who impressed him in a televised play about King Edward VII, was planning to run the Horseshoe Theatre in Basingstoke with her husband, Guy Slater. Cushing wrote to the couple and suggested they should stage The Heiress, a play by Ruth and Augustus Goetz, with Cushing himself in the lead role. Ryan and Slater agreed, and Cushing later said performing the part was his most pleasant experience since his wife had died four years earlier. Cushing also starred in several horror films released in 1975. Among them were Land of the Minotaur, where he played Baron Corofax, the evil leader of a Satanic cult opposed by a priest played by Donald Pleasence. Another was The Ghoul, where he played a former priest hiding his cannibalistic son in an attic. That film marked the first occasion on Cushing worked with the producer Kevin Francis, who worked in minor jobs at Hammer and had long aspired to work with Cushing, whom he admired deeply. They went on to make two other films together, Legend of the Werewolf (1975) and The Masks of Death (1984) with Cushing playing Sherlock Holmes once more. Cushing appeared in the television film The Great Houdini (1976) as Sir Arthur Conan Doyle, the creator of Sherlock Holmes. Cushing wrote the forewords to two books about Holmes: Peter Haining's Sherlock Holmes Scrapbook (1974) and Holmes of the Movies: The Screen Career of Sherlock Holmes (1976), by David Stuart Davies. Cushing also appeared in the horror film The Uncanny (1977).

=== Star Wars ===
The American filmmaker George Lucas approached Cushing with the hopes of casting him in his upcoming space fantasy film, Star Wars. Since the film's primary antagonist, Darth Vader, wore a mask throughout the entire film and his face was never visible, Lucas felt that a strong human villain character was necessary. This led him to write the character of Grand Moff Tarkin: a high-ranking Imperial governor and commander of the planet-destroying battle station the Death Star. Lucas felt a talented actor was needed to play the role and said Cushing was his first choice. However, Cushing claimed that Lucas originally approached him to play the Jedi Master Obi-Wan Kenobi and only decided to cast him as Tarkin instead after the two met. He said he would have preferred to play Kenobi rather than Tarkin but could not have done so because he was to be filming other roles when Star Wars was shooting, and Tarkin's scenes took less time to film than those of the larger Kenobi role. Although he was not a particular fan of science fiction, Cushing accepted the part because he believed his audience would love Star Wars and enjoy seeing him in the film.

Cushing joined the cast in May 1976, and his scenes were filmed at Elstree Studios in Borehamwood. Along with Sir Alec Guinness, who was ultimately cast as Kenobi, he was among the best-known actors at the time to appear in Star Wars, as the rest of the cast were then relatively unknown. As a result, he was paid a larger daily salary than most of his fellow cast, earning £2,000 per day compared to weekly salaries of US$1,000 for Mark Hamill, $850 for Carrie Fisher, and $750 for Harrison Ford, who played the protagonists Luke Skywalker, Princess Leia and Han Solo. When Cushing smoked between shots, he wore a white glove so the make-up artists would not have to deal with nicotine stains on his fingers. Like Guinness, he had difficulty with some of the technical jargon in his dialogue and claimed he did not understand all of the words he was speaking, later joking that "Grand Moff" sounded like "something which infests a clothes closet". Nevertheless, he worked hard to master his lines so that they sounded natural and that Tarkin, whom he described as a "deeply cross and unpleasant gentleman", came across as an intelligent and confident character.

Cushing got along well with the entire cast, especially his old Frankenstein and the Monster from Hell co-star David Prowse, who physically portrayed Darth Vader, and Carrie Fisher, who was appearing in her first major role as Princess Leia. The scene in which Tarkin and Organa appear together on the Death Star, just before the destruction of the planet Alderaan, was the first scene with major dialogue that Fisher filmed for Star Wars. Cushing consciously attempted to define their characters as opposite representations of good and evil, and he purposely stood in the shadows so the light shone on Fisher's face. Fisher said she liked Cushing so much that it was difficult to act as though she hated Tarkin, and she had to substitute somebody else in her mind to muster the feelings. Although one of her lines referred to Tarkin's "foul stench," she said Cushing smelt like "linen and lavender," something Cushing attributed to his tendency to wash and brush his teeth thoroughly before filming because of his self-consciousness about bad breath.

During the filming of Star Wars, Cushing was provided with a pair of boots far too small to accommodate his size twelve feet. This caused a great deal of pain for him during shooting, but the costume designers did not have enough time to get him another pair. As a result, he asked Lucas to film as many shots of him as possible from the waist up and, after the director agreed, Cushing wore slippers during the scenes where his feet were not visible. During rehearsals, Lucas originally planned for Tarkin and Vader to use a giant screen filled with computerized architectural representations of hallways to monitor the whereabouts of Skywalker, Solo, and Organa. Although the idea was abandoned before filming began, Cushing and Prowse rehearsed those scenes in a set built by the computer animation artist Larry Cuba. The close-up shots of Cushing aboard the Death Star, shown right before the battlestation is destroyed, were actually extra footage taken from previously shot scenes with Cushing that did not make the final film. During production, Lucas decided to add those shots, along with second unit footage of the Death Star gunners preparing to fire, to heighten the space battle scenes.

When Star Wars was first released in 1977, most preliminary advertisements touted Cushing's Tarkin as the primary antagonist of the film, not Vader; Cushing was extremely pleased with the final film, and he claimed his only disappointment was that Tarkin was killed and could not appear in the sequels. The film gave him the highest amount of visibility of his career and inspired younger audiences to watch his older films.

For the film Rogue One (2016), computer-generated imagery (CGI) and digitally repurposed archive footage were used to insert Cushing's likeness from the original movie over the face of the English actor Guy Henry. Henry provided the on-set capture and voice work with the reference material augmented and mapped over his performance like a digital body-mask. Cushing's estate-owners were heavily involved with the creation, which took place more than twenty years after Cushing died. This extensive use of CGI to create a virtual actor of a person who had died many years earlier created a great deal of controversy about the ethics of using a deceased actor's likeness. Joyce Broughton, Cushing's former secretary, had approved recreating Cushing in the film. After attending the London premiere, she was reportedly "taken aback" and "dazzled" with the effect of seeing him on screen again.

=== Later career ===
Towards the end of his career, Cushing performed in films and roles critics widely considered below his talent. The American filmmaker John Carpenter approached him to appear in the horror film Halloween (1978) as Samuel Loomis, the psychiatrist of the murderer Michael Myers, but Cushing turned down the role. It was also turned down by Christopher Lee, and eventually went to Donald Pleasence, another of Cushing's former co-stars. Cushing appeared alongside his old co-stars Lee and Vincent Price in House of the Long Shadows (1983), a horror-parody film featuring Desi Arnaz Jr. as an author trying to write a gothic novel in a deserted Welsh mansion.

Cushing appeared in the television film The Masks of Death (1984), marking both the last time he played Sherlock Holmes and the final performance for which he received top billing. He appeared alongside the British actor John Mills as Dr. Watson, and the two were noted by critics for their strong chemistry and camaraderie. As both actors were in their seventies, the screenwriter N.J. Crisp and the executive producer Kevin Francis both in turn sought to portray them as two old-fashioned men in a rapidly changing world. Cushing's biographer Tony Earnshaw said Cushing's performance in The Masks of Death was arguably his best interpretation of the role, calling it "the culmination of a life-time as a Holmes fan, and more than a quarter of a century of preparation to play the most complex of characters". The final notable roles of Cushing's career were in the comedy Top Secret! (1984), the fantasy film Sword of the Valiant (also 1984) and the adventure film Biggles: Adventures in Time (1986). In 1986 he appeared on the British television show Jim'll Fix It, hosted by Jimmy Savile, in which it was arranged for the wishes of guests to be granted. Cushing wished for a strain of rose to be named after his late wife, and it was arranged for the Helen Cushing Rose to be grown at the Wheatcroft Rose Garden in Edwalton, Nottinghamshire.

During this period, Cushing was honoured by the British Film Institute, which invited him in 1986 to give a lecture at the National Film Theatre. He also staged An Evening with Peter Cushing at St Edmund's School Canterbury to raise money for the local Cancer Care Unit. In 1987, a watercolour painting Cushing painted was accepted by Prince Edward and auctioned at a charity event he organised to raise funds for The Duke of Edinburgh's Award Scheme. Also that year, a sketch Cushing drew of Sherlock Holmes was accepted as the official logo of the Northern Musgraves Sherlock Holmes Society.

Cushing wrote two autobiographies, Peter Cushing: An Autobiography (1986) and Past Forgetting: Memoirs of the Hammer Years (1988). Cushing wrote the books as what he called "a form of therapy to stop me going stark, raving mad" following the loss of his wife. His old friend and co-star John Mills encouraged him to publish his memoirs as a way of overcoming the reclusive state Cushing had placed himself into following her death. In 1989 he was made an Officer of the Order of the British Empire for his contributions to the British film industry. Cushing also wrote a children's book called The Bois Saga, a story based on the history of England. Published in 1994, it was originally written specifically for the daughter of Cushing's long-time secretary and friend Joyce Broughton, to help her overcome reading problems resulting from her dyslexia. It was Broughton who encouraged Cushing to have the book published. His final acting job was narrating, along with Christopher Lee, the Hammer Films documentary Flesh and Blood: The Hammer Heritage of Horror (1994), which was recorded only a few weeks before his death. Produced by the American writer and director Ted Newsom, his contribution was recorded in Canterbury, near his home. Lee recognised Cushing's health was fading and did his best to keep his friend's spirits up, but Lee later claimed he had a premonition that it would be the last time he saw Cushing alive, which proved to be true.

== Personal life ==
Cushing had a variety of interests outside acting, including collecting and battling model soldiers, of which he owned over five thousand. He hand-painted many and used the Little Wars rule set by the English writer H. G. Wells for miniature wargaming. He also loved games and practical jokes, and enjoyed drawing and painting watercolours, the latter of which he did often in his later years.

After his wife's death, Cushing visited several churches and spoke to religious ministers, but was dissatisfied by their reluctance to discuss death and the afterlife, and never joined an organised religion. He nevertheless maintained a belief in both God and an afterlife, and even stated that "I suppose in a way it is possible that I was pre-ordained to play Van Helsing. For although I am not a religious man, I do try to live by Christian ethics and I believe in the truth as set forth in the New Testament. I can see so many of the elements of good and evil in life, and this seemed to give me added strength in my screen battles with the powers of darkness". He was an ardent vegetarian for most of his life and served as a patron with the Vegetarian Society from 1987 until his death. He also had a great interest in ornithology and wildlife in general. He suffered from nyctophobia (a fear of the dark) from early in his life, but in his later years, he overcame this by forcing himself to take walks outside after midnight.

Cushing was known among his colleagues for his gentle and gentlemanly demeanour, as well as his professionalism and rigorous preparation as an actor. He once said that he learned his parts "from cover to cover" before filming began. His co-stars and colleagues often spoke of his politeness, charm, old-fashioned manners and sense of humour. While working, he actively provided feedback and suggestions on other elements beyond his performance, such as dialogue and wardrobe. At times, this put him at odds with writers and producers; the Hammer producer Anthony Hinds once declared him a "fusspot [and] terrible fusser about his wardrobe and everything, but never a difficult man."

Although he appeared in both television and stage productions, Cushing preferred the medium of film, which allowed his perfectionist nature to work out the best performance possible. He did not enjoy the repetitive nature of stage performances, and once compared it to a painter being forced to paint the same picture every day. Cushing himself was not a particular fan of horror or science fiction films, but he tended to choose roles not based on whether he enjoyed them, but whether he felt his audience would enjoy him in them. Nevertheless, Cushing was very proud of his experiences with the Hammer films, and never resented becoming known as a horror actor. He always took the roles seriously and never portrayed them in a campy or tongue-in-cheek style because he felt it would be insulting to his audience.

On 10 April 1943, Cushing married Violet Hélène Beck, sister of Reginald Beck.

In 1971 Cushing's wife died of emphysema. Cushing often said he felt his life had ended when hers did, and he was so crushed that when his first autobiography was published in 1986, it made no mention of his life after her death. In 1972 he was quoted in the Radio Times as having said, "Since Helen passed on I can't find anything; the heart, quite simply, has gone out of everything. Time is interminable, the loneliness is almost unbearable and the only thing that keeps me going is the knowledge that my dear Helen and I will be reunited again some day. To join Helen is my only ambition. You have my permission to publish that ... really, you know, dear boy, it's all just killing time. Please say that."

In his autobiography, Cushing implies that he attempted suicide on the night of his wife's death by running up and down stairs in the vain hope that it would induce a heart attack. He later stated that this had simply been a hysterical response borne out of grief, and that he had not purposely attempted to end his life; a poem left by Helen had implored him not to die until he had lived his life to the full.

The effects of his wife's death proved to be as much physical as mental. For his role in Dracula A.D. 1972, Cushing (who was 58) had originally been cast as the father of Stephanie Beacham's character, but had aged so visibly and lost so much weight that the script was hastily rewritten to make him her grandfather: it was done again in the last Dracula film from Hammer, The Satanic Rites of Dracula. In a silent tribute to Helen, a shot of Van Helsing's desk includes a photograph of her. He repeated the role of the man who lost family in other horror films, including Asylum (1972), The Creeping Flesh (1973) and The Ghoul (1975).

== Death and legacy ==
In May 1982 Cushing was diagnosed with prostate cancer. He was rushed to Kent and Canterbury Hospital, where his doctors determined he had twelve to eighteen months to live; however, Cushing recovered well enough to be released from the hospital, and although his health continued gradually to decline, he lived another twelve years without any operative treatment or chemotherapy. During this period, he lived with Joyce Broughton and her family at their homes in Hartley, Kent.

In August 1994 Cushing entered himself into Pilgrims Hospice in Canterbury, where he died on 11 August at the age of 81. In accordance with his wishes he had a low-profile funeral with family and friends, although hundreds of fans and well-wishers came to Canterbury to pay their respects. In January 1995 a memorial service was held in The Actors' Church in Covent Garden, with addresses given by Christopher Lee, Kevin Francis, Ron Moody and James Bree.

In total, Cushing appeared in more than 100 films throughout his career.

In an interview included on the DVD release of The Hound of the Baskervilles (1959), Lee said of his friend Cushing's death:

I don't want to sound gloomy, but at some point of your lives, every one of you will notice that you have in your life one person, one friend whom you love and care for very much. That person is so close to you that you are able to share some things only with him. For example, you can call that friend, and from the very first maniacal laugh or some other joke you will know who is at the other end of that line. We used to do that with him so often. And then when that person is gone, there will be nothing like that in your life ever again.

Several filmmakers and actors have cited Cushing as an influence, including Doug Bradley, who played Pinhead in the Hellraiser horror films, and John Carpenter, who directed such films as Halloween (1978), Escape from New York (1981) and The Thing (1982). The director Tim Burton and the actor Johnny Depp both said the portrayal of Ichabod Crane in Sleepy Hollow was intended to resemble that of Cushing's old horror film performances.

In 2008, fourteen years after his death, Cushing's image was used in a set of stamps issued by Royal Mail honouring Hammer Studios films on the fiftieth anniversary of the release of Dracula. In 2013 Cushing was honoured by Royal Mail as one of ten individuals selected for their "Great Britons" commemorative postage stamp issue.

In May 2013, to mark the hundredth anniversary of his birth, Horror novelist Stephen Volk produced a novella titled "Whitstable" featuring a grieving Cushing being approached by a young boy who has mistaken him as his character Professor Van Helsing and asks for his help, believing his new step-father to be a vampire.

== Filmography ==
=== Film ===
Year	Title	Role	Note
1939	The Man in the Iron Mask	Second Officer	Playing opposite Louis Hayward to facilitate the double exposure scenes, with a small role of his own
1940	Laddie	Robert Pryor	
1940	A Chump at Oxford	Student	
1940	Vigil in the Night	Joe Shand	
1940	Women in War	Captain Evans	Uncredited
1940	The Howards of Virginia	Leslie Stephens	Uncredited
1941	They Dare Not Love	Sub-Lieutenant Blackler	Uncredited
1948	Hamlet	Osric	
1952	Moulin Rouge	Marcel de la Voisier	
1954	The Black Knight	Sir Palamides	
1955	The End of the Affair	Henry Miles	
1955	Magic Fire	Otto Wesendonk	
1956	Alexander the Great	General Memnon	
1957	Time Without Pity	Jeremy Clayton	
1957	The Curse of Frankenstein	Victor Frankenstein	First lead role
1957	The Abominable Snowman	Dr. Rollason	
1958	Violent Playground	Priest	
1958	Dracula	Doctor Van Helsing	
1958	The Revenge of Frankenstein	Doctor Victor Stein	
1959	The Hound of the Baskervilles	Sherlock Holmes	
1959	John Paul Jones	Captain Richard Pearson	
1959	The Mummy	John Banning	
1960	The Flesh and the Fiends	Dr. Robert Knox	Released in U.S. as Mania
1960	Cone of Silence	Captain Clive Judd	Released in U.S. as Trouble in the Sky
1960	The Brides of Dracula	Doctor Van Helsing	
1960	Suspect	Professor Sewell	
1960	Sword of Sherwood Forest	Sheriff of Nottingham	
1961	The Hellfire Club	Merryweather	
1961	Fury at Smugglers' Bay	Squire Trevenyan	
1961	The Naked Edge	Mr. Evan Wrack	
1961	Cash on Demand	Harry Fordyce	
1962	Captain Clegg	Parson Blyss	Alternative title: Night Creatures
1962	The Devil's Agent		(Cushing's scenes were deleted); co-stars Christopher Lee
1963	The Man Who Finally Died	Dr. Peter von Brecht	
1964	The Evil of Frankenstein	Victor Frankenstein	
1964	The Gorgon	Dr. Namaroff	
1965	Dr. Terror's House of Horrors	'Dr. Terror' / Dr. W. R. Schreck	
1965	She	Major Holly	
1965	The Skull	Christopher Maitland	
1965	Dr. Who and the Daleks	Dr. Who	
1966	Island of Terror	Dr. Brian Stanley	
1966	Daleks' Invasion Earth 2150 A.D.	Dr. Who	
1967	Frankenstein Created Woman	Baron Frankenstein	
1967	Night of the Big Heat	Dr. Vernon Stone	
1967	Torture Garden	Lancelot Canning	(segment 4: "The Man Who Collected Poe")
1967	Some May Live	John Meredith	
1968	The Blood Beast Terror	Detective Inspector Quennell	Alternate title: The Vampire-Beast Craves Blood
1968	Corruption	Sir John Rowan	
1969	Frankenstein Must Be Destroyed	Baron Frankenstein	
1970	Incense for the Damned	Dr. Walter Goodrich	Alternative title: Bloodsuckers
1970	Scream and Scream Again	Major Heinrich Benedek	
1970	One More Time	Baron Frankenstein	Uncredited
1970	The Vampire Lovers	General von Spielsdorf	
1971	The House That Dripped Blood	Philip Grayson	(segment 2: "Waxworks")
1971	Twins of Evil	Gustav Weil	
1971	I, Monster	Frederick Utterson	
1972	Tales from the Crypt	Arthur Edward Grimsdyke	(segment 3: "Poetic Justice")
1972	Dracula A.D. 1972	Lawrence Van Helsing and Lorrimer Van Helsing	
1972	Dr. Phibes Rises Again	Captain	
1972	Asylum	Mr. Smith	(Segment 2: "The Weird Tailor")
1972	Fear in the Night	Michael Carmichael	
1972	Horror Express	Dr. Wells	
1973	Nothing But the Night	Sir Mark Ashley	
1973	The Creeping Flesh	Emmanuel Hildern	
1973	And Now the Screaming Starts!	Dr. Pope	
1973	The Satanic Rites of Dracula	Lorrimer Van Helsing	
1974	Shatter	Rattwood	
1974	From Beyond the Grave	Antique Shop Proprietor	
1974	Frankenstein and the Monster from Hell	Baron Frankenstein	
1974	The Beast Must Die	Dr. Christopher Lundgren	
1974	Madhouse	Herbert Flay	
1974	The Legend of the 7 Golden Vampires	Professor Van Helsing	
1974	Tender Dracula	MacGregor	
1975	Legend of the Werewolf	Professor Paul	
1975	The Ghoul	Dr. Lawrence	Medalla Sitges en Plata de Ley Award for Best Actor
1976	Trial by Combat	Sir Edward Gifford	Alternative title: Dirty Knights Work
1976	At the Earth's Core	Dr. Abner Perry	Film was "riffed" as part of the 2017 revival of Mystery Science Theater 3000 on Netflix.
1976	Land of the Minotaur	Baron Corofax	Alternative title: The Devil's Men
1977	Star Wars	Grand Moff Tarkin	Nominated: Saturn Award for Best Supporting Actor
1977	Shock Waves	SS Commander	Alternative title: Almost Human
1977	The Uncanny	Wilbur	
1977	The Standard	Baron von Hackenberg	
1978	Son of Hitler	Heinrich Haussner	
1979	Arabian Adventure	Wazir Al Wuzara	
1979	A Touch of the Sun	Commissioner Potts	Alternative title: No Secrets!
1981	Misterio en la isla de los monstruos	William T. Kolderup	Alternative title: Mystery on Monster Island
1981	Black Jack	Sir Thomas Bedford	Alternative title: Asalto al casino
1983	House of the Long Shadows	Sebastian Grisbane	Caixa de Catalunya Award for Best Actor (shared with Vincent Price, Christopher Lee & John Carradine)
1984	Top Secret!	Bookstore Proprietor	Swedish Bookstore scene, filmed in reverse with Val Kilmer and Lucy Gutteridge
1984	Sword of the Valiant	Seneschal – Gaspar	
1986	Biggles: Adventures in Time	Air Commodore William Raymond	

=== Television ===
Year	Title	Role	Note
1952	Pride and Prejudice	Mr. Darcy	Mini-series (all 6 episodes)
1953	Epitaph for a Spy	Josef Vadassey	Mini-series (all 6 episodes)
1953	You are There	Rudolf Hess	Episode: "The Escape of Rudolf Hess"
1951–1957	BBC Sunday-Night Theatre	Various	12 episodes, including "Nineteen Eighty-Four"
1962	Drama 61-67	Frederick James Parsons	Episode: "Drama '62: Peace with Terror"
1962	ITV Television Playhouse	Fred Parsons	Episode: "Peace with Terror"
1963	The Spread of the Eagle	Cassius	Mini-series
1963	Comedy Playhouse	Albert Fawkes	Episode: "The Plan"
1964	Story Parade	Elijah Baley	Episode: "The Caves of Steel" (unknown season)
1965	Thirty-Minute Theatre	Leonard	Episode: "Monica"
1967	The Avengers	Paul Beresford	Episode: "Return of the Cybernauts"
1968	Sherlock Holmes	Sherlock Holmes	All 16 episodes from season 2
1973	Orson Welles Great Mysteries	Count Gerard De Merret	Episode: "La Grande Breteche"
1974	The Zoo Gang	Judge Gautier	Episode: "The Counterfeit Trap"
1976	Space: 1999	Raan	Episode: "Missing Link"
1976	Looks Familiar		1 episode – dated 2 February 1976
1976	The New Avengers	Von Claus	Episode: "The Eagle's Nest"
1980	Hammer House of Horror	Martin Blueck	Episode: "The Silent Scream"
1983	Tales of the Unexpected	Von Baden	Episode: "The Vorpal Blade"

=== Television films ===
Year	Title	Role	Note
1951	When We Are Married	Gerald Forbes	
1952	If This Be Error	Nick Grant	
1952	Asmodée	Blaise Lebel	
1952	The Silver Swan	Lord Henriques	
1953	Rookery Nook	Clive Popkiss	
1953	The Noble Spaniard	Duke of Hermanos	
1953	A Social Success	Henry Robbins	
1954	The Face of Love	Mardian Thersites	
1955	Richard of Bordeaux	Richard II	
1955	The Browning Version	Andrew Crocker-Harris	
1957	Home at Seven	David Preston	
1958	The Winslow Boy	Sir Robert Morton	
1958	Uncle Harry	Uncle Harry	
1976	The Great Houdini	Sir Arthur Conan Doyle	
1980	A Tale of Two Cities	Dr. Alexander Manette	
1984	Helen Keller: The Miracle Continues	Professor Charles Copeland	
1984	The Masks of Death	Sherlock Holmes	

=== Short films ===
Year	Title	Note	Role
1940	The Hidden Master	Robert Clive of India	(Uncredited role)
1940	Dreams	First Dreamer	
1946	It Might Be You	The Doctor	

=== Other credits ===
Year	Title	Role	Note
1965	Late Night Line-Up	Himself	Four separately recorded interviews (with Michael Dean, Rudolf Cartier and Yvonne Mitchell) about the 1954 TV. production of Nineteen Eighty-Four
1969–1980	The Morecambe & Wise Show	Himself	Long-running gag involving being owed payment
1971	BBC Wildlife Spectacular	Himself – Presenter	
1986	Dieter & Andreas		Grateful acknowledgment
1986–1988	Wogan	Himself	Regular guest
2012	House of the Long Shadows... Revisited		Dedicated to
2016	Rogue One: A Star Wars Story	Grand Moff Tarkin	Special acknowledgment; Posthumous release; CGI recreation used for likeness

== Sources ==
This article incorporates text from a free content work. Licensed under CC BY-SA 3.0 (license statement/permission). Text taken from Peter Cushing, Wookieepedia, Wikia.
