= Pamela Mann-Francis =

British script supervisor (1927–2020)

- Mann-Francis on the set of The Innocents
- Born: Pamela Anne Mann; 26 March 1927; London, UK
- Died: 23 August 2020 (aged 93)
- Other names: Pamela Mann
- Occupation: Film continuity

Pamela Mann-Francis (1927–2020), also credited as Pamela Mann, was a British script supervisor who worked predominantly in film.

== Early life ==
Pamela Mann-Francis was born as Pamela Anne Mann in London in 1927, living in Wembley Park. As a child, Mann was a fan of film, going to the cinema several times a week, even during air raids. When her local cinema was taken over by the army, she would visit one of the other three cinemas in Wembley. She left school aged sixteen and learnt Pitman shorthand, then began working in advertising and music publishing. Her father worked at a motor company in Mayfair before freelancing during the Second World War and then starting a motor company of his own.

== Career ==
Attracted to the role of "continuity girl", as script supervisors were known in the UK at the time, because of its focus on typing, Mann-Francis' first job in film was for The Rank Organisation. Through her secretarial work at Bradbury Wood, which focused on selling sheet music, Mann-Francis got to know singer Jean English, whose husband worked at Rank. After cultivating a friendship, she was offered the job, which she only stayed in for a few weeks before joining Wessex Films at Pinewood Studios.

She initially worked in publicity. In 1952 she worked with David Lean on The Sound Barrier, and soon became his secretary. It was on Lean's 1955 film Summertime that Mann-Francis first worked in continuity, stepping in when the credited continuity girl became ill. Though she was not a member of the Association of Cinematograph Technicians (ACT) union, she was allowed to work as it was considered a foreign production; she thus had three roles on Summertime but received no credit and was only paid as Lean's secretary. In 2013, Mann-Francis said that she had always wanted to be involved in continuity but started her career as a member of the National Association of Theatrical and Kine Employees union, which did not permit it. She was admitted to the ACT by 1957, when she worked as production secretary on The Bridge on the River Kwai.

She took more continuity roles, including some work in American television, from the late 1950s, but took a career break after 1963's Billy Liar; she returned to the industry first with commercials, and then The Empire Strikes Back in 1980.

Mann-Francis is cited as one of the "continuity girl" icons and highlighted hardships of the role in interviews later in life, including long working hours with little appreciation; her difficulties in attaining ACT membership; and a memorable experience in her first continuity job trying to remember whether Katharine Hepburn's earrings had been accounted for.

== Personal life ==
She married director Freddie Francis in 1963, and they were together until Francis' death in 2007. The couple first met working on Saturday Night and Sunday Morning, before getting closer on The Innocents. They had two children, whom Mann-Francis raised while taking unpaid work during her career break. Mann-Francis died in August 2020.
