= Persecution (film) =

- Directed by: Don Chaffey
- Screenplay by: Robert B. Hutton; Rosemary Wootten
- Produced by: Kevin Francis
- Starring: Lana Turner; Ralph Bates; Olga Georges-Picot; Trevor Howard
- Cinematography: Kenneth Talbot
- Edited by: Mike Campbell
- Music by: Paul Ferris
- Production company: Tyburn Film Productions
- Distributed by: Doverton Films (UK); Fanfare Films (US)
- Release dates: 7 November 1974 (UK); October 1975 (US)
- Running time: 95 minutes
- Country: United Kingdom
- Language: English

Persecution (U.S. titles: Sheba and The Terror of Sheba; video release: The Graveyard) is a 1974 British psychological horror film directed by Don Chaffey, produced by Kevin Francis and starring Lana Turner, Ralph Bates, Olga Georges-Picot, Trevor Howard and Suzan Farmer. It was written by Robert B. Hutton and Rosemary Wootten.

== Plot summary ==
Carrie Masters is a crippled, wealthy, bitter woman who takes pleasure in tormenting her young son David. She blames him for her crippled leg and, in bizarre and horrifying ways, exacts her revenge by dominating him.

Years later, a 24-year-old David returns home with his wife Janie and their newborn child, but he is still subject to his mother's evil influence. When she is involved in two terrifying deaths, David's mind snaps; although he is already mentally twisted by Carrie's treatment, David becomes completely insane and swears vengeance on his mother for his years of hate and resentment.

== Cast ==
- Lana Turner as Carrie Masters
- Ralph Bates as David Masters
- Trevor Howard as Paul Bellamy
- Olga Georges-Picot as Monique Kalfon
- Suzan Farmer as Janie Masters
- Mark Weavers as young David
- Patrick Allen as Robert Masters
- Jennifer Guy as waitress
- Shelagh Fraser as Mrs. Banks
- Ronald Howard as Dr. Ross
- John Ryan as gardener
- Catherine Brandon as Mrs. Deacon

== Production ==
Persecution was shot in the United Kingdom from late October to November 1973 at Pinewood Studios in London and exterior scenes of the Masters House were shot on location at Denham Place in Buckinghamshire.

== Reception ==
Persecution was a commercial and critical failure and widely panned by critics.

The Monthly Film Bulletin wrote: "Ken Talbot's photography is commendably glowing, but Ralph Bates is glum and Don Chaffey's direction uninspired."

Variety wrote: "The old-fashioned meller is riddled with ho-hum and sometimes laughably trite scripting. Also, very tame in the shock horror department. Under the circumstances, Turner's performance has reasonable poise. There isn't much animation to Ralph Bates as the grown-up edition of the tormented son."

Time Out wrote: "Routine attempt at a psychological thriller, given more weight than it deserves by a good performance from Ralph Bates as the pawn in his pathologically domineering mother's game. Lana Turner, as the rich American widow living in London and haunted by a richly murky past, labours to hold her head high and bear up despite the Grand Guignol all round her tipping into embarrassing silliness. Trevor Howard makes a fleeting guest appearance, and Chaffey's direction lapses into the tic of concealing the camera behind whatever comes to hand (leaves, a balustrade, fire...)."

Richard Schleib in The Science Fiction, Horror and Fantasy Movie Review wrote: "Turner hams it up and she and Ralph Bates have fun playing games with one another. Don Chaffey’s pace is slow moving, despite occasionally inventive photography and some offbeat editing. The story is confusing – by the end, one is never sure who David’s real father was. The catty premise is not terribly interesting and the script trades in some unconvincingly histrionic psychology. The one show stealer is the sultry seductive Olga Georges-Picot."

Lana Turner dismissed the film as a "bomb" and called it one of her worst performances during an interview in 1975.
