= The Hound of the Baskervilles (1959 film) =

Film by Terence Fisher

- Theatrical release poster
- Directed by: Terence Fisher
- Screenplay by: Peter Bryan
- Based on: The Hound of the Baskervilles (1902 novel) by Sir Arthur Conan Doyle
- Produced by: Anthony Hinds
- Starring: Peter Cushing; André Morell; Christopher Lee; Marla Landi; David Oxley
- Cinematography: Jack Asher
- Edited by: Alfred Cox; James Needs (sup.)
- Music by: James Bernard
- Production company: Hammer Film Productions
- Distributed by: United Artists
- Release dates: 27 March 1959 (London Pavilion); 4 May 1959 (UK)
- Running time: 84 minutes
- Country: United Kingdom
- Language: English
- Box office: 1,257,132 admissions (France)

The Hound of the Baskervilles is a 1959 British Gothic mystery film directed by Terence Fisher and produced by Hammer Film Productions, based upon Arthur Conan Doyle's 1902 novel. It stars Peter Cushing as Sherlock Holmes, André Morell as Doctor Watson, and Christopher Lee as Sir Henry Baskerville. It is the first adaptation of the novel to be filmed in colour. It was released by United Artists on May 4, 1959.

== Plot ==
Dr. Richard Mortimer recounts to Sherlock Holmes and Doctor Watson in Baker Street the legend of the Hell hound that killed the devilish Sir Hugo Baskerville in retaliation for his misdeeds, including murdering the daughter of a servant. He asks Holmes to investigate the death of his friend Sir Charles Baskerville, in Dartmoor, from heart failure, in the moor surrounding his estate, Baskerville Hall, with a look of horror on his face. Mortimer fears for the life of Sir Henry, Sir Charles' nephew and heir, who's just come from South Africa to take possession of his inheritance and of Baskerville Hall.

Although sceptical, Holmes and Watson agree to meet Sir Henry who complains that one of his boots is missing. Mortimer tells them that the Baskerville estate is worth about £1,000,000. A peculiar threat from a dangerous tarantula convinces Holmes that Sir Henry's life is in danger. Claiming that he cannot come to Baskerville Hall himself, Holmes dispatches Watson to Dartmoor with Mortimer and Sir Henry. Holmes tells Sir Henry not to go out onto the moor after dark.

On their way to Baskerville Hall, the trio learns that Selden, a convicted murderer, has escaped Dartmoor Prison and is hiding on the moor. At Baskerville Hall, Mr. Barrymore, the butler, and Mrs. Barrymore, the housekeeper show them around the mansion. One of two portraits of Sir Hugo is missing, and the Barrymores say it was mysteriously stolen months before. The next day, Sir Henry and Watson meet Bishop Frankland, a bishop and keen entomologist. Watson gets trapped in a patch of mire in the Grimpen Mire and is saved by a farmer named Stapleton and his daughter Cecile, a girl who bewitches Sir Henry.

That night, Watson and Sir Henry investigate a light on the moor. They briefly encounter a strange man who flees in the shadows, and a distant hound howls, provoking in Sir Henry a mild heart attack. Watson spots a man on a hill in the distance while helping Sir Henry back to Baskerville Hall. Watson discovers it to be Holmes, who has concealed his own arrival to investigate more freely.

Selden, wearing Sir Henry's clothes, is slaughtered by the unseen hound. Holmes and Watson find his body mutilated in a ritual, and the legendary curved dagger of Sir Hugo. The Barrymores confess to have helped Selden, who was their relative, by supplying food and clothes each time he signaled with a light from his hideout. Holmes is convinced that neither the Barrymores nor Selden are connected to the death of Sir Charles. He also figures that the tarantula found in London was stolen from Bishop Frankland.

After surviving personal danger in an abandoned tin mine while looking for evidence of a hound, Holmes is able to deduce who unleashed the hound in pursuit of Sir Charles. Holmes explains about questioning Barrymore about the missing portrait; it was stolen because it revealed the fingers on Sir Hugo's right hand were webbed just like Stapleton's. Finding the dagger stolen, Holmes and Watson follow Sir Henry and Cecile to the moor. Cecile takes Sir Henry to the ruins where Holmes and Watson hear Cecile reveal her intentions to a horrified Sir Henry, revealing that she and her father are also descendants of Sir Hugo, planning to claim the inheritance as their own once Sir Henry is dead. The hound appears and attacks Sir Henry, until Holmes shoots it, causing it to back off. With Sir Hugo's curved dagger, Stapleton attempts to attack Watson, who shoots and wounds him. The wounded hound attacks Stapleton and fatally mauls him. Holmes shoots and kills the hound. Sir Henry is unscathed from the mauling as Holmes reveals the hound to be an ordinary dog wearing a mask to make it look more terrifying. Cecile tries to flee across the moor, only to fall into the Grimpen Mire and sink to her death as Holmes and Watson take a shocked Sir Henry back to Baskerville Hall. Back in Baker Street, Holmes and Watson are given by Sir Henry the stolen portrait of Sir Hugo that was found on the Stapleton farm.

== Cast ==
- Peter Cushing as Sherlock Holmes
- André Morell as Doctor Watson
- Christopher Lee as Sir Henry Baskerville
- Marla Landi as Cecile Stapleton
- David Oxley as Sir Hugo Baskerville
- Francis de Wolff as Doctor Richard Mortimer
- Miles Malleson as Bishop Frankland
- John Le Mesurier as Barrymore
- Ewen Solon as Stapleton
- Helen Goss as Mrs. Barrymore
- Sam Kydd as Perkins
- Michael Hawkins as Lord Caphill
- Judi Moyens as servant girl
- Michael Mulcaster as Selden
- David Birks as servant

== Production ==
=== Casting ===
Peter Cushing was an aficionado of Sherlock Holmes and brought his knowledge to the project. He re-read the stories, made detailed notes in his script and sought to portray Holmes closer to his literary counterpart. It was Cushing's suggestion that the mantelpiece feature Holmes's correspondence transfixed to it with a dagger as per the original stories. However, when producer Anthony Hinds suggested excluding the famous deerstalker cap, Cushing objected, saying Holmes' headgear and pipes would be expected by the audience. Cushing scrutinised the costumes and screenwriter Peter Bryan's script, often altering words or phrases. Christopher Lee later said he was awestruck by Cushing's ability to incorporate many different props and actions into his performance simultaneously, whether reading, smoking a pipe, drinking whiskey, filing through papers or other things while portraying Holmes.

André Morell was particularly keen that his portrayal of Watson should be closer to that originally depicted in Conan Doyle's stories, and away from the bumbling stereotype established by Nigel Bruce's interpretation of the role.

David Oxley had powerful voice that he used to great effect, being able to perform without the aid of microphones, and seen to best effect as Hugo Baskerville.

=== Filming ===
Filming took place at Bray Film Studios and on-location at Chobham Common and Frensham Ponds, both in Surrey.

== Differences from the novel ==
There are notable significant changes from the novel. Among them:

- The legend of the hound and Hugo Baskerville is radically changed. In the novel, the father of the farm girl who is kidnapped by Sir Hugo Baskerville is away when Hugo kidnaps her. In the film, the father is a servant of Hugo's and is cruelly abused when he begs for his daughter's life. Baskerville tortures the father by burning him in the hearth. In the novel, after the girl escapes, Baskerville chased her across the moor and Baskerville's companions find the girl dead from fear and Hugo killed by the hound. In the film, over the protests of his companions, Baskerville pursues the girl alone, his hounds and horse become frightened as they approach the nearby abbey ruins due to the sound of the hound howling. However, Sir Hugo dismounts, pursues the girl on foot, catches her and stabs her to death with his dagger. Hugo is subsequently killed by the hound.
- Sir Henry arrives from Toronto in the novel, while he arrives from Johannesburg in the film. Sir Henry does not suffer a minor heart condition in the novel, as he does in the film.
- There is nothing involving a ritual sacrifice, a tarantula or a mine shaft in the novel, nor is Holmes thought to have been accidentally trapped in a cave-in. There is no attempt on the life of Sir Henry at the hotel in the novel, as in this film.
- Rather than being Stapleton's daughter, Miss Stapleton is Stapleton's wife in the novel and is playing the part of his sister. She does not hate Sir Henry, as she does in the film, and is a far more sympathetic character in the novel. Cecile in the novel is named Beryl and is an unwilling participant. In the film, she is much more sinister. Miss Stapleton survives in the novel, whereas in the film Cecile drowns in the Grimpen Mire.
- Inspector Lestrade, who appears in the novel, is omitted from the film.
- In the novel, the hound is made to look "demonic" through the use of phosphorus paint, but in the film the same effect is accomplished with a mask. The hound was played by a brindled Great Dane.
- The painting next to the staircase does not go missing in the novel, as Stapleton's webbed hand is a creation of the filmmakers.
- In the novel, Frankland is neither a bishop nor an entomologist. It is Stapleton, rather than Frankland, who is an acknowledged expert in entomology in the novel.
- Stapleton does not get mauled to death after being shot by Watson in the novel; he simply disappears and is presumed to have drowned in the Grimpen Mire.
- Dr. Mortimer is never put in charge of watching over Sir Henry in the novel; therefore he is not considered negligent by Watson when Sir Henry ventures out onto the moor alone. Mortimer in the novel is an amiable, unambitious, absent-minded young man. The film's version is much older and is made a pompous suspect from the start as a red herring.

The Conan Doyle Estate did not approve of the changes made to suit Hammer's more horror-centric success. Cushing, however, made no objection to the changes as he felt the character of Holmes remained intact.

== Release ==
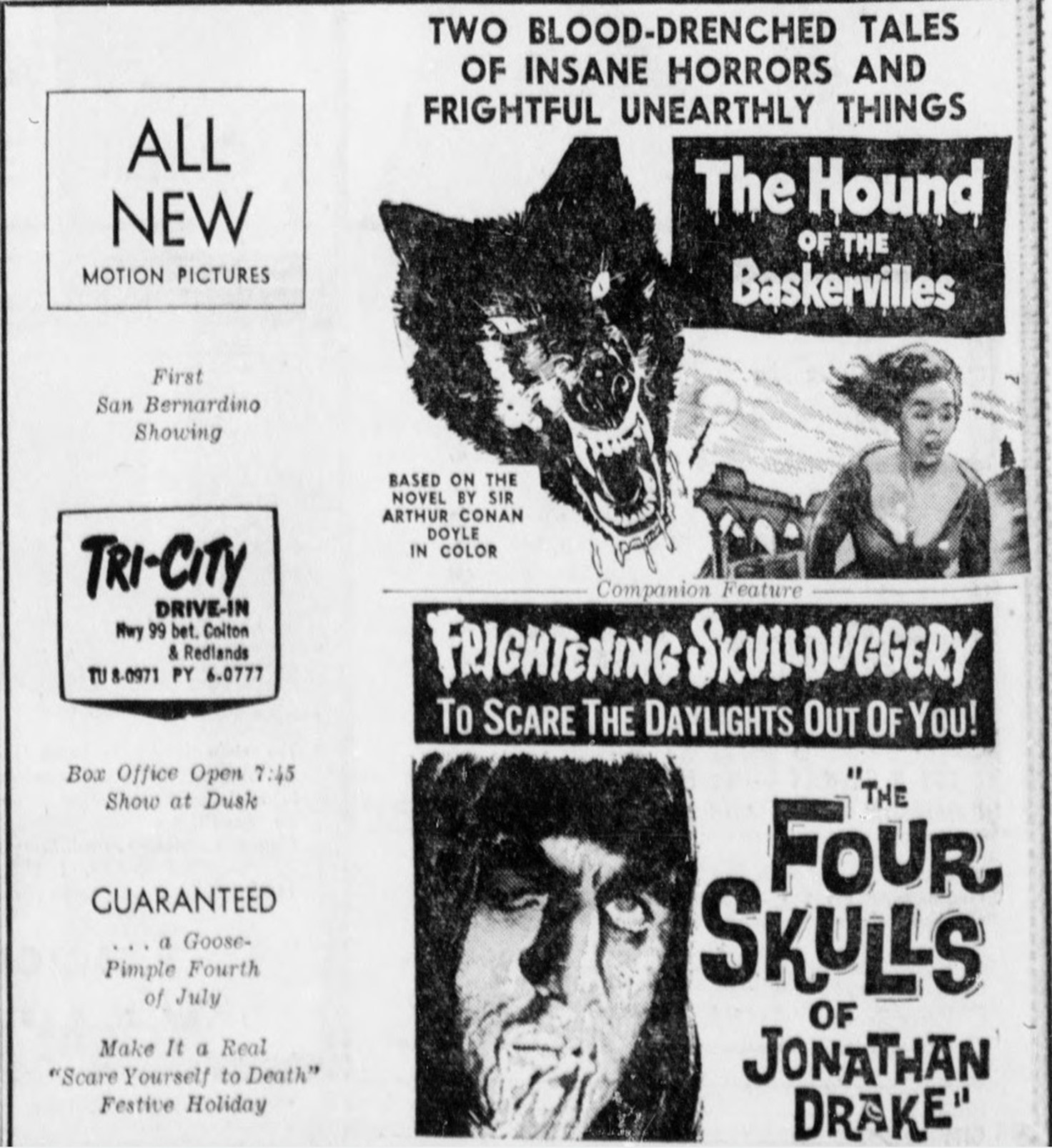
Drive-in advertisement from 1959 for The Hound of the Baskervilles (with no mention of Sherlock Holmes) and co-feature, The Four Skulls of Jonathan Drake.

The film opened at the London Pavilion on 27 March 1959.

== Reception ==
=== Box office ===
According to Kinematograph Weekly the film performed "better than average" at the British box office in 1959.

=== Critical response ===
Peter Cushing's Holmes received good reviews at the time, with Films and Filming calling him an "impish, waspish, Wilde-ian Holmes", while the New York Herald Tribune stated "Peter Cushing is a forceful and eager Sherlock Holmes". André Morell's Watson has been praised for his far more accurate rendition of the character as envisioned by Arthur Conan Doyle, as opposed to the comical buffoon created by Nigel Bruce.

A negative review in the Monthly Film Bulletin stated that "any freshly entertaining possibilities in this much-filmed story have here been lost in a welter of blood, love interest and mood music". The review also noted unimaginative staging and direction and "dull performances".

Time Out (London) called it "the best Sherlock Holmes film ever made, and one of Hammer's finest movies". On Rotten Tomatoes it has a 94% approval rating based on reviews from 18 critics.

The film was originally planned to be the first in a series of Hammer-produced Holmes films starring Cushing, but due to its below-expectations commercial performance these films were cancelled.

== Relation to other works ==
Peter Cushing later portrayed Holmes in the 1965-68 BBC television series and the 1984 television film The Masks of Death. Christopher Lee portrayed Holmes in the 1965 film Sherlock Holmes and the Deadly Necklace (also directed by Terence Fisher) and in a pair of television films (Sherlock Holmes and the Leading Lady and Incident at Victoria Falls) in the early 1990s, as well as playing Mycroft Holmes in 1970's The Private Life of Sherlock Holmes.
