= The Masks of Death =

1984 television film directed by Roy Ward Baker

- Genre: Crime; Horror; Thriller
- Written by: Anthony Hinds; N.J. Crisp
- Story by: John Elder
- Directed by: Roy Ward Baker
- Starring: Peter Cushing; John Mills; Anne Baxter; Ray Milland; Anton Diffring; Gordon Jackson; Susan Penhaligon
- Music by: Malcolm Williamson

Production
- Executive producer: Kevin Francis
- Producer: Norman Priggen
- Cinematography: Brendan J. Stafford, BSC
- Editor: Chris Barnes
- Running time: 78 minutes
- Production company: Tyburn Film Productions

Original release
- Release: 23 December 1984

The Masks of Death is a 1984 British mystery television film directed by Roy Ward Baker and starring Peter Cushing as Sherlock Holmes and John Mills as Doctor Watson.

== Plot ==
In 1913, Sherlock Holmes, virtually in retirement, is persuaded by Inspector Alec MacDonald of Scotland Yard to take on a baffling case. Three dead bodies have been found in London's East End, all with no discernible cause of death, but the expressions on their faces suggest that they all died in a state of terror.

Holmes, accompanied by Dr Watson, begins an investigation, but before he can make any real progress he is visited by the British Home Secretary and a German Diplomat, Count Udo von Felseck, who tell Holmes that a German envoy, on a secret mission to Britain, has disappeared from Felseck's house in Buckinghamshire. Unless Holmes can track him down, war between the two countries will become imminent. Holmes considers the possibility that the two matters are related and that someone is not telling him the truth.

== Cast ==
- Peter Cushing as Sherlock Holmes
- John Mills as Doctor Watson
- Anne Baxter as Irene Adler
- Ray Milland as Home Secretary
- Anton Diffring as Count Udo von Felseck
- Gordon Jackson as Inspector Alec MacDonald
- Susan Penhaligon as Miss Derwent
- Marcus Gilbert as Anton von Felseck
- Jenny Laird as Mrs. Hudson
- Russell Hunter as Alfred Coombs
- James Cossins as Frederick Baines
- Eric Dodson as Lord Claremont
- Georgina Coombs as Lady Claremont
- Dominic St Clair as Boot Boy

== Production ==
=== Development ===
Executive producer Kevin Francis had previously attempted to raise funds for a new version of The Hound of the Baskervilles. Francis intended to cast Peter Cushing as Holmes, which would be Cushing's third take on the Doyle tale after the 1959 Hammer production and the two-part production for the 1968 television series, and feature a stop-motion dog created by Ray Harryhausen.

While funding for the proposed film collapsed, it led to Francis discussing an original tale with writer Anthony Hinds.

=== Casting ===
This is Peter Cushing's final portrayal of Sherlock Holmes. He first donned Holmes' deerstalker in Hammer's The Hound of the Baskervilles (1959). Later, he took over from Douglas Wilmer in the BBC television series Sir Arthur Conan Doyle's Sherlock Holmes in the late 1960s. Cushing considered Sherlock Holmes to be his favourite role but his age, Cushing being in his 70s, required the part to be written for a much older Holmes.

The trouble is that I'm 70, far too old to play Holmes as he appears in the stories written by Sir Arthur Conan Doyle.

=== Filming ===
Filming began in the summer of 1984 at Twickenham Film Studios with location work in Buckinghamshire and London.

== Unproduced sequel ==
There were plans for a follow-up titled The Abbot's Cry but the film never materialized due to Cushing's declining health.
