= Kevin Francis (film producer) =

British film and television producer

- Born: 1949 (age 76–77); King's Cross, London, England
- Occupations: Film producer, television producer
- Father: Freddie Francis

Kevin Francis is a British film and television producer.

Prior to working in film production, Francis had apprenticed in livestock working his way up to a slaughterman before becoming a livestock buyer. Francis' time working as a buyer gave him additional training in accounting and finance and when approached by someone who worked for a smaller film producer this led to Francis gaining experience as a producer including on a few films by Hammer Film Productions.

He has worked in the cinema as a production manager and producer and in television as a producer and executive producer. He founded the production company Tyburn Film Productions Limited, which Francis, as a horror fan, sought to make Tyburn a successor to Hammer Film Productions and Amicus Productions. His father was cinematographer and film director Freddie Francis.

== Filmography ==
- And Now for Something Completely Different (1971) (production manager)
- Persecution (1974) (producer) ... a.k.a. Sheba, The Graveyard, The Terror of Sheba
- The Ghoul (1975) (producer) ... a.k.a. The Thing in the Attic
- Legend of the Werewolf (1975) (producer)
- The Masks of Death (1984) (executive producer)
- Murder Elite (1985) (executive producer)
- Peter Cushing: A One-Way Ticket to Hollywood (1989) (executive producer)
