= Legend of the Werewolf =

- Promotional movie poster for the film
- Directed by: Freddie Francis
- Written by: Anthony Hinds
- Produced by: Kevin Francis
- Starring: Peter Cushing; Ron Moody; Hugh Griffith; Roy Castle; David Rintoul
- Cinematography: John Wilcox
- Edited by: Henry Richardson
- Music by: Harry Robertson
- Production company: Tyburn Film Productions
- Distributed by: Fox-Rank(UK, theatrical)
- Release date: April 1975
- Running time: 85 minutes
- Country: United Kingdom
- Language: English

Legend of the Werewolf is a 1975 British horror film directed by Freddie Francis and starring Peter Cushing, Ron Moody, Hugh Griffith, Roy Castle and David Rintoul in his film debut. It is an uncredited adaptation of the Guy Endore novel The Werewolf of Paris, which screenwriter Anthony Hinds had previously adapted as The Curse of the Werewolf (1961). The film was produced by Tyburn Film Productions, a company founded by the director's son Kevin Francis. It was released in the United Kingdom by Fox-Rank in April 1975.

== Plot ==
At midnight on Christmas Eve in the mid-19th century, somewhere in Russia, two fugitives fleeing persecution stop by the roadside for the woman to have her baby. The mother dies, and the father is slaughtered by wolves. However, the wolves protect the baby instead of killing it, and the baby grows into a wild boy.

Years later, a trio of circus performers find the boy out in the woods, and use him as an attraction called the "Wolf Boy". He is named Etoile, and loses his wolfish aspects, and his public appeal, as he grows up. One night, Etoile changes into a wolfman under the influence of the full moon, and kills a circus member, Tiny. As he is dying, he accuses Etoile, who flees.

He soon arrives in Paris, and becomes assistant to a zookeeper. That same day, a group of prostitutes from a nearby brothel visit to have lunch, and Etoile is smitten by the pretty Christine. She takes a liking to him, but keeps her job a secret. Later, Etoile decides to take Christine dancing, but is turned away by Madame Tellier. He tries to sneak in by the window, but catches Christine in the middle of entertaining a client. He bursts through the window in a jealous rage, and attacks the client. Madame Tellier stops him, and chases him away. Christine confronts Etoile the next morning, and in the ensuing argument, she tells him about her history as an orphan until Madame Tellier took her in. Etoile asks Christine to marry him, but she tells him it would not work. That night, Etoile changes again, and kills clients leaving the brothel.

The attacks draw the interest of Professor Paul Cataflanque, a skilled forensic pathologist, who initially deduces that it was a wolf. He embarks on his own investigation against the protests of his friend, Inspector Gerard, and inspects the wolves in Etoile's zoo. Etoile's demonstration of their gentleness leaves Paul sceptical, as does the new evidence gathered. The evidence leads him to the brothel, and he questions Madame Tellier, who is put out by his requests to identify the bodies. He brings photographs of the victims, and she lies about having seen them. However, Christine sees them also, and Paul, noting her reaction, questions her in private. She admits to having had them as clients, but leaves Etoile out of her story.

Meanwhile, the Prefect of Police decides to make Paul's wolf theory official, and orders all zoos to kill their wolves. Etoile is given the grisly task, and he is beside himself with grief. Christine visits him, and leaves to get the zookeeper, thinking Etoile is sick. Etoile changes, and escapes into the sewer before she returns. With his rage and grief spurring his viciousness, Etoile goes on a killing spree, and hides in the sewers the next day. Paul discovers one of the victims is still alive, and revives her long enough to hear her speak of a creature neither a man nor a wolf. Paul's servant Boulon tells him of the werewolf tales from his countryside home, and Paul deduces the attacker will kill the next night. He interviews Christine again, and asks her to wait in Etoile's room. He gets a map of the sewers, and forges a silver bullet as a precaution.

That night, he goes down into the sewers, and encounters Etoile. Paul tries to reason with him, offering his help. Etoile is temporarily brought to sanity, but Gerard, warned by Boulon, attacks at the last minute. Etoile flees to the zoo, followed by Paul. Christine is shocked and frightened by Etoile's wolf form, but Etoile does not hurt her. Paul tries once more, but Gerard shoots Etoile with the silver bullet. Etoile dies, changing back into a man while Christine looks on in grief.

== Cast ==
- Peter Cushing as Professor Paul Cataflanque
- Ron Moody as the Zookeeper
- Lynn Dalby as Christine
- David Rintoul as Etoile/Wolf Boy
- Stefan Gryff as Inspector Max Gerard
- David Bailie as Boulon
- Hugh Griffith as Maestro Pamponi
- Renée Houston as Chou-Chou
- Marjorie Yates as Madame Tellier
- Norman Mitchell as Tiny
- Hilary Farr as Zoe
- Roy Castle as Photographer
- Michael Ripper as Sewerman
- Patrick Holt as Dignitary
- John Harvey as Prefect of Police
- Pamela Green as Anne-Marie (uncredited)

== Production ==
The film was produced by Tyburn Film Productions, a short-lived company that attempted to make films in the style of Hammer Horrors. The film was shot at Pinewood Studios from 19 August 1974. The screenplay was written by Anthony Hinds under his pseudonym John Elder. Hinds was also the writer of Hammer's only werewolf film The Curse of the Werewolf (1961), in which Michael Ripper also appeared, and which is also largely based on the novel The Werewolf of Paris. Though as noted, Legend of the Werewolf contains many similarities to the Guy Endore novel The Werewolf of Paris, that novel’s author is not credited anywhere in the film. The film's sets were designed by the art director Jack Shampan.

== Release ==
The film was distributed by The Rank Organisation. Although released in British cinemas, in the United States it was released on VHS only. The film was released on DVD for the first time by Cheezy Flicks on 17 October 2017.

== Related items ==
- Black, Robert (pseudonym of Robert Holdstock). Legend of the Werewolf. Novelisation of the film.
- Buscombe, Edward. Making Legend of the Werewolf. BFI Publications, 1976. 122-page book which provides a full production history of the film.
