= The Isle of Lost Ships =

The Isle of Lost Ships may refer to:

- The Isle of Lost Ships (1923 film), a 1923 silent film
- The Isle of Lost Ships (1929 film), a 1929 talking film
