= No Sex Please, We're British (film) =

No Sex Please: We're British
- Directed by: Cliff Owen
- Screenplay by: Adaptation: Brian Cooke; Johnnie Mortimer
- Based on: No Sex Please, We're British by: Alistair Foot; Anthony Marriott
- Produced by: John R. Sloan
- Starring: Ronnie Corbett; Ian Ogilvy; Susan Penhaligon; Beryl Reid; Arthur Lowe
- Cinematography: Ken Hodges
- Edited by: Ralph Kemplen
- Music by: Eric Rogers
- Distributed by: Columbia Pictures
- Release dates: 25 July 1973 (UK); 10 August 1979 (USA)
- Running time: 91 min.
- Country: United Kingdom
- Language: English

No Sex Please, We're British is a 1973 British comedy film directed by Cliff Owen and starring Ronnie Corbett, Ian Ogilvy, Susan Penhaligon and Arthur Lowe. It was written by Brian Cooke and Johnnie Mortimer based on the 1971 play of the same name by Alistair Foot and Anthony Marriott, with multiple changes in the film adaptation.

== Synopsis ==
Runnicles, a clerk in a small-town British bank (openly depicted in the film as the branch of Barclays Bank in Windsor High Street), is horrified when a package arrives containing pornography, rather than the new calculator he expected. His efforts to dispose of it, while avoiding detection, turn into a farcical series of events involving a bank inspector, the police, and a local criminal to whom the pornography actually belongs.

== Cast ==
- Ronnie Corbett as Brian Runnicles
- Ian Ogilvy as David Hunter
- Susan Penhaligon as Penny Hunter
- Beryl Reid as Bertha Hunter
- Arthur Lowe as Mr Bromley
- Michael Bates as Mr Needham
- Cheryl Hall as Daphne Martin
- David Swift as Inspector Paul
- Deryck Guyler as Park keeper
- Valerie Leon as Susan
- Margaret Nolan as Barbara
- Gerald Sim as Reverend Mower
- John Bindon as Pete
- Stephen Greif as Niko
- Michael Robbins as car driver
- Frank Thornton as glass shop manager
- Michael Ripper as traffic warden
- Lloyd Lamble as American man
- Mavis Villiers as American lady
- Sydney Bromley as rag & bone man
- Brian Wilde as policeman in park
- Eric Longworth as man with lighter
- Edward Sinclair as postman
- Fred Griffiths as delivery man
- Lucy Griffiths as spinster lady
- Robin Askwith as baker's delivery man

== Production ==
The film was partly financed by producer John Woolf.

== Critical reception ==
In The Monthly Film Bulletin John Gillett wrote: "Cliff Owen directs at a frenetic pace throughout, with everyone charging through doors and shouting madly. He occasionally mines some genuine comedy from the sheer pile-up of incident; but the material finally defeats him, and even the climactic car chase turns out a very flat set-piece. The actors do their British best to keep the laughs coming, with Ronnie Corbett working hard in his characteristic stuttering style, while Arthur Lowe turns in a neat and unexaggerated portrait of the glowering bank manager and Michael Bates provides a sharp cameo as a much put-upon bank inspector. "

Writing in 1979, at the time of the American release, The New York Times reviewer commented: "In its own way, it is well done ... (with) its simple-minded and by now rather outdated double and triple entendres."

In The Radio Times Guide to Films Tony Sloman gave the film 2/5 stars, writing: "One of the West End's longest running comic farces arrived on the screen virtually intact, but with a significantly different leading man. Whereas Michael Crawford had consolidated both career and image by instigating the gawky, inadvertent gauche lead on stage, in the film the role went to the diminutive British comedian Ronnie Corbett. Corbett does well by the hackneyed plot, and underrated director Cliff Owen keeps up the pace."

TV Guide said: "A pleasing performance from Corbett ... saves this otherwise average British farce from the usual doldrums."
