= American Trip =

2020 book by Israeli scholar Ido Hartogsohn

American Trip: Set, Setting, and the Psychedelic Experience in the Twentieth Century
- Cover
- Author: Ido Hartogsohn
- Language: English
- Subject: Psychedelics, cultural history, science and technology studies
- Genre: Non-fiction
- Publisher: MIT Press
- Publication date: July 14, 2020
- Publication place: United States
- Media type: Print (Paperback), eBook
- Pages: 432
- ISBN: 9780262539142

American Trip: Set, Setting, and the Psychedelic Experience in the Twentieth Century is a 2020 book by Israeli author, artist, activist and academic Ido Hartogsohn. The book examines the historical, social, and cultural influences on the psychedelic experience in midcentury America. Published by MIT Press, the work explores how factors such as the mindset of the user ("set") and the environment of the experience ("setting") shaped the outcomes of psychedelic use during the 1950s and 1960s. Hartogsohn explores the diverse applications of psychedelics, including experiments by the CIA, various military research, therapeutic practices, and their impact on art, music, and the countercultural movement. The author introduces the concept of collective set and setting, by integrating perspectives from science, technology, and society studies, hence framing the psychedelic experience as a product of its sociocultural context.

== Author and background ==
Hartogsohn was a journalist and blogger before academia. He published the first Hebrew book covering the field of psychedelia, Technomystica: Consciousness in the Age of Technology (2009), and served as an editor of Lapsychonaut, an Israeli magazine on psychedelics. He also organized Altered Minds (2017), the first Israeli conference on Psychedelics. As of 2024, Hartogsohn serves as assistant professor at the Graduate Program in Science, Technology and Society at Bar-Ilan University.

In a 2020 interview with the New Books Network, Hartogsohn described his transition from writing fiction to writing nonfiction first as a journalist, and later as an academic interested in the topic of psychedelics, which became his main focus as a scholar, artist, activist, and writer.

In 2021, The author discussed the book in an online round table organized by the Yale Psychedelic Science Group. Hartogsohn elaborated on the central concept of "set and setting," highlighting its critical role in shaping psychedelic experiences not only at the individual level but also within broader cultural and societal contexts. He argued that the effects of psychedelics are not intrinsic but are shaped by historical and cultural forces, introducing the idea of "collective set and setting." Hartogsohn emphasized that psychedelics amplify meaning, create hyper-associative connections, and dissolve boundaries, all of which interact dynamically with the environment and cultural frameworks. He also stressed how Western cultural attitudes and societal trends, such as the sexual revolution and countercultural movements, influenced the interpretation and use of psychedelics. Hartogsohn tied these insights to contemporary issues in drug policy and mental health, advocating for a systematic understanding of context to optimize the benefits of psychedelics while minimizing risks.

== Overview ==
The book examines how personal, environmental, and sociocultural factors shaped the use and perception of psychedelics in 1950s and 1960s America. Central to the book is the concept of "set and setting"—the user's mindset and environment—expanded into "collective set and setting," which considers broader societal influences.

Hartogsohn describes seven distinct uses of psychedelics in mid-twentieth century United States. He first studies the early "Experimental Psychosis Movement," which viewed psychedelics as drugs mimicking psychosis, and the Cold War-era experiments by the CIA and military, which highlighted the darker side of coercive settings. He additionally details the transition to therapeutic and spiritual uses, focusing on the work of 1960s investigators of psychedelics Betty Eisner and Timothy Leary, who emphasized structured environments to optimize positive outcomes. Hartogsohn delves into investigations into the efficacy of psychedelics as creativity- and innovation-enhancing drugs, highlighting their influence on art, culture, and technological innovation, particularly in Silicon Valley.

Hartogsohn addresses the societal backlash against psychedelics, as media and political pressure led to criminalization, contrasting with their countercultural embrace as tools of liberation. The book concludes by advocating for integrating the concept of set and setting into future drug policy and research, emphasizing its broader applicability to human experience.

== Reviews ==
Historian and public health researcher Alex Mold considered the book as a "scholarly but also engaging" examination of the diverse ways psychedelics were used and understood, particularly through the concept of Set and Setting. Mold found the book balanced in its mix of vivid examples and insightful analysis, suggesting it remains valuable in light of the contemporary interest in psychedelic micro-dosing.

Andrew Jones, from the University of Toronto, praised Hartogsohn's historical analysis, which traced seven distinct contexts of psychedelic use in 1950s and 1960s America, noting how these varying circumstances led to different interpretations and outcomes of psychedelic experiences. However, Jones critiqued the book for occasionally relying on what he considered broad generalizations, observing that "Hartogsohn’s focus on set and setting sometimes risks overshadowing other important dimensions of the psychedelic experience." Despite this, he regarded the book as a valuable contribution to drug policy and psychedelic studies, particularly for its call to integrate collective cultural elements into contemporary drug research.

Israeli researcher Ephraim Philip Lansky commended Hartogsohn's integration of "set and setting" into both individual and societal contexts. Lansky appreciated the book's exploration of how cultural factors shaped the psychedelic movement of the 1960s. He described the book as an "erudite and readable social history of psychedelics".

Scholar and novelist Maria Cichosz lauded the author for the comprehensive exploration of "collective set and setting," which expands the psychedelic concept of "set and setting" to include broader sociocultural influences. She stressed the book's multidisciplinary approach, particularly its "nuanced and detailed accounts of how developments in psychedelic medicine shaped the American trip" as a strength. Still, she criticized the structure of the book, describing its organization as "both exhaustive and exhausting," and noted that key terms and conceptual frameworks were introduced too late, leaving earlier chapters feeling "aimlessly descriptive." Despite these remarks, Cichosz deemed the book as a valuable contribution to the fields of drug policy, harm reduction, and social science approaches to psychedelics.

Australian drug researcher Anna Lutkajtis said the work effectively links historical context with psychedelic experiences. She commended Hartogsohn's ability to demonstrate how culture and society shape the outcomes of psychedelic use, noting that the book "provides a timely and significant contribution to the growing field of psychedelic studies."

Lucas Richert viewed the work as an engaging exploration of how psychedelics intersected with American society, culture, and regulatory frameworks in the mid-20th century. He considered Hartogsohn's emphasis on "set and setting" as central to understanding the cultural and individual impacts of psychedelics.

New York State historian Devin Lander judged the work as a "well-researched and readable" book that offers an expansive study of how mid-20th-century American culture shaped the psychedelic experience through the framework of "set and setting." Lander said that Hartogsohn's use of historical examples, including lesser-known figures like Max Rinkel and Betty Eisner, alongside Timothy Leary, demonstrated how psychedelics were viewed as tools for psychotherapy, creativity, and political harmony. However, he noted that Hartogsohn's interchangeable use of "LSD" for all psychedelics could be "somewhat confusing" and highlighted the complexity of the subject.

Austrian health scientist Claudia Gertraud Schwarz emphasized the book's integration of science and technology studies (STS) concepts to explore the broader sociocultural dynamics of "set and setting." She commended Hartogsohn's ability to trace the historical and cultural multiplicity of psychedelic use in mid-20th-century America, emphasizing its relevance to critical psychedelic research.

American psychedelics researcher and author Thomas B. Roberts reviewed the book, highlighting its insightful use of the "set and setting" concept to explore how societal attitudes toward psychedelics were shaped by cultural and social influences. Roberts applauded the way the book organizes the complex history of psychedelics into distinct thematic periods, describing them as "handy frames of reference" that bring clarity to a multifaceted narrative. Roberts also noted the depth of the research, particularly the detailed chapter notes and bibliography. He did, however, suggest that the analysis could be enhanced by incorporating the development of trans-personal psychology during the late 20th century.

== Format ==
The book is organized into ten chapters. The early chapters provide a historical account of psychedelic research and cultural influence in 1950s and 1960s America, starting with the "Experimental Psychosis Movement" and progressing through the CIA's covert experiments, therapeutic innovations, and the use of psychedelics in fostering creativity and technological advancements. The latter chapters delve into the broader sociocultural implications, introducing the concept of "collective set and setting" and reflecting on its relevance to both the past and future of psychedelic research and policy. The book concludes with a discussion of how these concepts can inform modern drug research and societal attitudes.
