= Anthony Marriott =

English writer and actor (1931–2014)

- Born: Anthony John Crosby Marriott; 17 January 1931; London, UK
- Died: 17 April 2014 (aged 83); Denville Hall, Northwood, London
- Education: Felsted School; Royal Central School of Speech and Drama
- Spouse: Heulwen Roberts (died 1999)
- Children: 3

Anthony John Crosby Marriott JP (17 January 1931 – 17 April 2014) was a British playwright, screenwriter, and stage and television actor.

As a playwright he was best known as the joint author, with Alistair Foot, of the farce No Sex Please, We're British, which opened at the Strand Theatre, London, on 3 June 1971. It has been performed in 52 countries and on 21 February 1979 became the longest running comedy in the history of world theatre. A film version starring Ronnie Corbett was released in 1973.

In 1967 Marriott was hired by Amicus Productions to rewrite Robert Bloch's screenplay for The Deadly Bees, a film based on the novel A Taste for Honey by Gerald Heard.

Marriott also co-created the long-running British television series Public Eye with Roger Marshall. He never wrote a televised episode for the series, but did write an original novel based on it, Marker Calls the Tune, in 1968. He also wrote television and radio for the BBC and The Rank Organisation.

He lived for many years in Osterley, West London and was a Justice of the Peace.

== Other plays ==
- With Alistair Foot, Uproar in the House, Garrick Theatre and Whitehall Theatre, 1967–69
- With John Chapman, Shut Your Eyes and Think of England, Apollo Theatre, 1977
