= The Deadly Bees =

1967 British film by Freddie Francis

- Promotional poster
- Directed by: Freddie Francis
- Screenplay by: Robert Bloch; Anthony Marriott
- Based on: A Taste for Honey by Gerald Heard
- Produced by: Max J. Rosenberg; Milton Subotsky
- Starring: Suzanna Leigh; Guy Doleman; Frank Finlay
- Cinematography: John Wilcox
- Edited by: Oswald Hafenrichter
- Music by: Wilfred Josephs
- Production company: Amicus Productions
- Distributed by: Paramount Pictures
- Release date: April 1967
- Running time: 83 minutes
- Country: United Kingdom
- Language: English

The Deadly Bees is a 1967 British horror film based on H. F. Heard's 1941 novel A Taste for Honey. It was directed by Freddie Francis, and stars Suzanna Leigh, Guy Doleman, and Frank Finlay. The original screenplay was by Robert Bloch but was rewritten by Anthony Marriott. The film was released theatrically in the United States in 1967 and was featured in a 1998 episode of Mystery Science Theater 3000.

Heard's novel, which was a sort of Sherlock Holmes pastiche, had been previously adapted for television as a 60-minute drama episode of The Elgin Hour: season 1, episode 11 under the title "Sting of Death" (22 February 1955), starring Boris Karloff as the detective character from Heard's novel, Mr. Mycroft. According to H. F. Heard's official website, kinescopes of this TV dramatisation survive, and, in 2014, it was made commercially available for home video as one of several features in a DVD, released by Synergy Entertainment, titled Sherlock Holmes: The Archive Collection Vol. 1.

== Plot ==
The film opens with two men from an unnamed ministry commenting on a spate of letters from a beekeeper claiming to have developed a strain of killer bees. They dismiss him as a lunatic, though his letters claim he will start killing people if he is not taken seriously.

Meanwhile, pop singer Vicki Robbins (Suzanna Leigh) collapses from exhaustion on television and is sent to recuperate in a cottage on Seagull Island. The proprietors of the "rest home" are a depressed, disgruntled couple, Ralph and Mary Hargrove (Guy Doleman and Catherine Finn). Ralph is a beekeeper, as is his neighbour, H. W. Manfred (Frank Finlay). Manfred claims to control his bees via a tape recording of a high note made by a death's-head moth, which hypnotises them.

Vicki begins to notice mysterious happenings. Mary's dog and later Mary herself are attacked by the bees and killed, leading Vicki to suspect Hargrove. She and Manfred start to snoop around; he encourages her to search through Hargrove's papers, and she discovers that Hargrove has managed to isolate "the smell of fear" into a liquid form. Manfred tells her this must mean that Hargrove has been baiting the bees with this substance. Bees soon attack Vicki in her room at the cottage, and she later escapes to Manfred's house. He tells her he will go back to Hargrove's farm to collect evidence, but this arouses Vicki's suspicion.

Vicki searches Manfred's house and discovers his secret laboratory, and when he returns, he admits that he was the killer. He tells her that he used his visit to the other farm as a pretence to plant the fear pheromone and kill Hargrove, his target all along, as he suspected Manfred's ill intentions. Now that she knows his secret, he must kill Vicki too. However, she thwarts his attempt by destroying his moth recording, leading him to be stung to death and crash through a banister but also accidentally setting the house on fire. Meanwhile, Manfred's bees swarm and attack the pub landlord, investigating the Hargrove place. Hargrove chases after him with a smoker and saves him by telling him to throw away the jacket. Hargrove and the landlord rush to Manfred's and see the house on fire, and they save a trapped Vicki just in time.

Vicki leaves the island the next day, just as a bowler-hatted ministry official finally arrives to investigate the deaths.

== Cast ==
- Suzanna Leigh as Vicki Robbins
- Frank Finlay as H. W. Manfred
- Guy Doleman as Ralph Hargrove
- Catherine Finn as Mary Hargrove
- John Harvey as Thompson
- Michael Ripper as David Hawkins
- Anthony Bailey as Compere
- Tim Barrett as Harcourt
- James Cossins as Coroner
- Frank Forsyth as Doctor
- Katy Wild as Doris Hawkins
- Greta Farrer as Sister
- Gina Gianelli as Secretary
- Michael Gwynn as Dr. George Lang
- Maurice Good as Agent

The television sequence toward the beginning features a performance by British pop group The Birds (not to be confused with American group The Byrds). The group's lead guitarist is Ronnie Wood (later of Faces and The Rolling Stones) and the sequence was filmed on 14 January 1966 at Shepperton Studios.

== Production ==
Though the script was originally adapted from Gerald Heard's novel A Taste for Honey by noted author Robert Bloch, best known for Psycho, critics invariably derided the film, citing its uninspired acting, ludicrous special effects (including plastic flies glued to actors' faces to show them being "stung"), and continuity errors.

Bloch blamed the film's poor showing on the fact he wrote it for Christopher Lee and Boris Karloff (to reprise his performance from the 1955 TV version that aired as an episode of The Elgin Hour), who were both unavailable due to scheduling difficulties; and on the fact that director Freddie Francis and writer Anthony Marriott had decided to 'improve' Bloch's script. Bloch's screenplay featured Mr. Mycroft from Heard's novel; this character was removed under instruction from Amicus. According to Bloch:

I still felt the story and characters strong enough to warrant preservation, and tried to retain as much of the basic plot and atmosphere as possible, working with a synopsisation Milton Subotsky provided ... I did put my kindly old villain in a wheelchair – which made the part right for Boris Karloff of course – and my red herring character was designed for Christopher Lee. But while the producers were away ... the director decided to improve my work; besides, Karloff and Lee were too expensive anyway ... My concept was a far cry from what emerged as Frank Finlay's part. When the script was re-written the result was, in my opinion, a hybrid affair with no inner consistency or logical story-line: the bees were menacing but the characters were not. I'm sure that if Freddie Francis and I could have ... discussed our disparate approaches we might well have come to an agreement which could have resulted in a stronger film; unfortunately, that wasn't feasible ... as with Caligari and The Couch, I shudder every time this item is mentioned or shown ... Everything in pre-production had been planned for it, and they didn't have the money to scrap all the preproduction sets, so they had to go ahead ... That came off I think rather badly. This is no reflection on Anthony Marriott, the writer who took my script over there and did the rewrites. He did what he was told, and I'm sure he's a very competent man, but it didn't come off in the slightest as I had written it.

Bloch wrote in his autobiography Once Around the Bloch: An Unauthorized Autobiography:

Once the completed screenplay arrived in England, the problem of matching stellar schedules – and salaries – put the roles into other hands and the script itself into the hands of its director. As is often the case, he decided to improve it, with the aid of a writer called Anthony Marriott, but apparently without the knowledge of Rosenberg and Subotsky [Amicus Films' producers], who left prior to production. Both of them had liked my original version, but by the time they returned, the screenplay had been improved past recognition and the shoot was already beginning. Sometime during 1966 the film was released under a new title [which implies Bloch's script was titled, as the novel was, A Taste for Honey] The Deadly Bees. As such it soon buzzed off into critical oblivion, unwept, unhonoured and unstung.

Bloch is reputed to have been so annoyed by the interference with his script that he never bothered to see the completed film.

== Critical reception ==
- Allmovie gave the film a negative review, writing, "There's little in Bees worth watching."
- Referencing The Birds, The New York Times said "Mr. Hitchcock would never have sanctioned a sloppy, raucously framed little thriller like this."

== Mystery Science Theater 3000 ==
The film was the subject of episode #905 of Mystery Science Theater 3000, which first aired on May 8, 1998, on the Sci-Fi Channel. Calling it an “odd movie”, series writer Paul Chaplin said of The Deadly Bees: “In a way you have to admire the idea that a movie might be centered so purposefully and irretrievably on dreariness, and still presume to hold an audience's attention.”

Paste writer Jim Vorel ranked the episode as middling, placing it #99 out of 197 MST3K episodes from the first twelve seasons. Calling the movie "stuffy and exceedingly British" with "portions that drag a bit," Vorel admits the movie "looks crisp and is easily understood." Vorel also points out the riffs on "weird bits of British dialog" are standouts, as is Mike and the bots' reaction to the bowler-hatted man who shows up in the film's final minutes.

The MST3K version of The Deadly Bees has not been released on DVD. The segments of the episode that take place outside of the movie theater were included in the Satellite Dishes feature on MST3K: Volume XXXIX, which was released October 31, 2017.

== DVD/Blu-Ray ==
The Deadly Bees was released on DVD and Blu-ray on 27 October 2015, in 1.78:1 aspect ratio, by Olive Films, under license from Paramount Pictures.
