= Suzanna Leigh =

English actress (1945–2017)

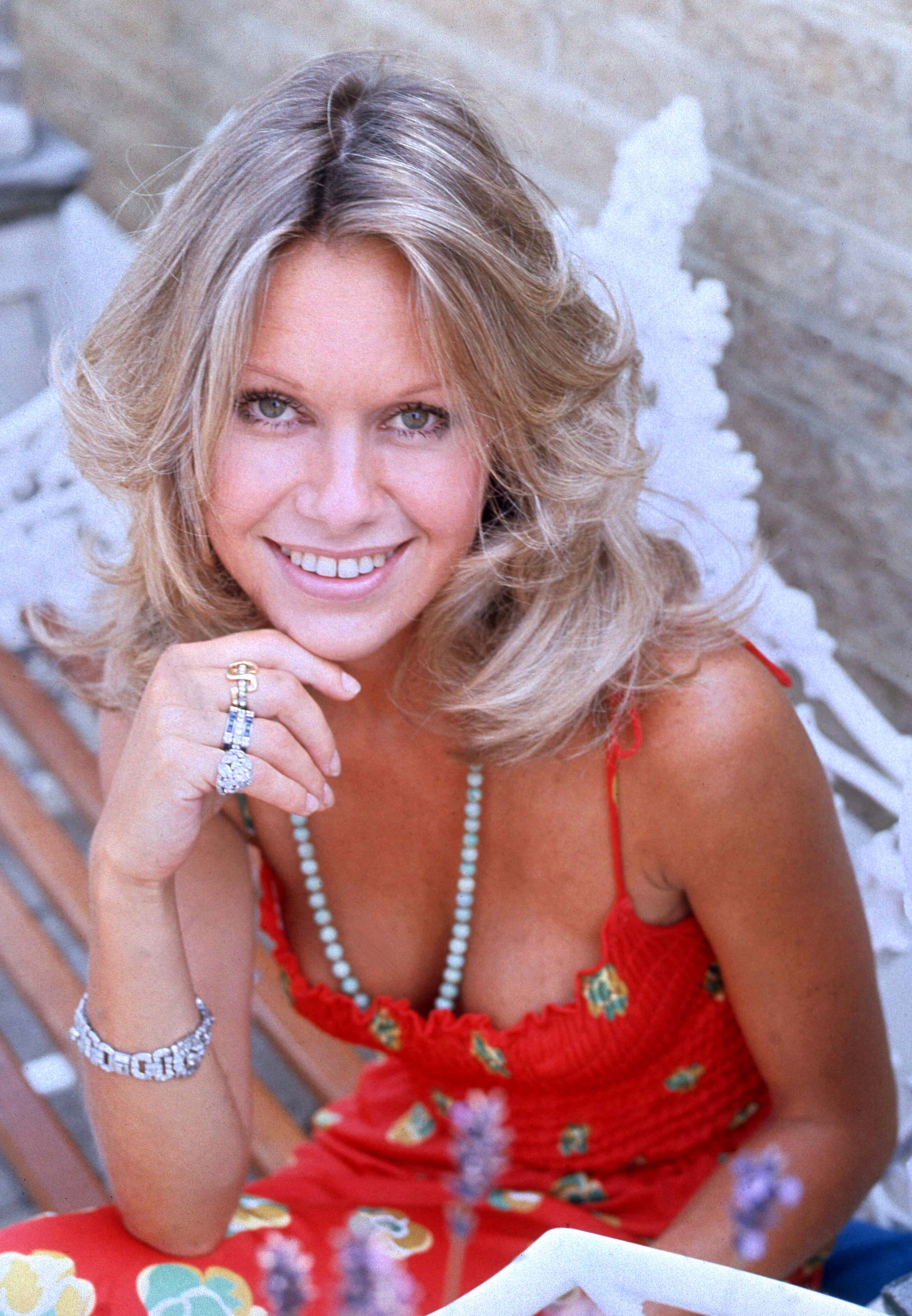
- Leigh in 1977
- Born: Sandra Eileen Anne Smith; 26 July 1945; Reading, Berkshire, England
- Died: 11 December 2017 (aged 72); Winter Garden, Florida, U.S.
- Occupation: Actress
- Years active: 1956–2016
- Known for: Paradise, Hawaiian Style; The Deadly Bees; The Lost Continent; Lust for a Vampire
- Partner: Tim Hue-Williams (1972–1982)
- Children: 1

Suzanna Leigh (born Sandra Eileen Anne Smith; 26 July 1945 – 11 December 2017) was a British actress, known for her film and television roles in the 1960s and 1970s.

== Early life and education ==
Born Sandra Eileen Anne Smith on 26 July 1945, Leigh grew up in Berkshire, England, and later went to convent schools outside London. She began working in films while still a child, appearing as an extra in several British productions. She changed her name to Suzanna Leigh after entering film, whilst under the tutelage of her godmother, Vivien Leigh

== Career ==
Leigh's film roles include the love interest of Elvis Presley in Paradise, Hawaiian Style (1966), a stewardess in the comedy Boeing Boeing (1965), and the heroine in a couple of Hammer films - The Lost Continent (1968) and Lust for a Vampire (1971).

She starred in the cult British horror films The Deadly Bees (1966) and The Fiend (1972). In 1974 she starred as Amber in Son of Dracula. In 2015, she was a featured player in the film Grace of the Father. She wrote a 2000 autobiography, Paradise, Suzanna Style.

== Death ==
Leigh was diagnosed with stage-four liver cancer in September 2016 and died in December 2017 in Winter Garden, Florida.

== Filmography ==
Film
Year	Title	Role	Notes
1956	The Silken Affair	Minor Role	Uncredited
1957	Man from Tangier		Uncredited
1958	Tom Thumb	Extra in 'Dancing Shoes' sequence	Uncredited
1960	Oscar Wilde	Minor Role	Uncredited
1961	Bomb in the High Street	Jackie	
1965	The Pleasure Girls	Dee	
1965	Boeing Boeing	Vicky Hawkins	British United
1966	Paradise, Hawaiian Style	Judy Hudson (Friday)	
1966	The Deadly Bees	Vicki Robbins	
1967	Deadlier Than the Male	Grace	
1968	The Lost Continent	Unity Webster	
1968	Subterfuge	Donetta	
1970	Docteur Caraïbes	Laura	
1971	Lust for a Vampire	Janet Playfair	
1972	The Fiend	Paddy Lynch	
1973	Son of Dracula	Amber	
2015	Grace of the Father	Judith Hudson	(final film role)
Television
Year	Title	Role	Notes
1963	It Happened Like This	Amanda Morris	1 episode
1964	The Saint	Lilla McAndrew	1 episode
1966	The Wednesday Play	Elaine	1 episode
1966	Trois étoiles en Touraine		TV movie
1969	Journey to the Unknown	Vickie	1 episode
1970	ITV Playhouse	Ingrid	1 episode
1970	The Persuaders!	Emily Major	1 Episode
1973	Docteur Caraïbes	Laura	4 episodes
1978	The Chiffy Kids	Miss Armitage	1 episode

== Writings ==
- Paradise, Suzanna Style
- 2014: "Thank you, Lord", Touched by an Angel, chickensoup.com; accessed 14 December 2017.
