= The Lost Continent (1968 film) =

1968 British film by Michael Carreras

- Film poster
- Directed by: Michael Carreras
- Written by: Michael Nash aka Michael Carreras
- Based on: Uncharted Seas by Dennis Wheatley
- Produced by: Michael Carreras
- Starring: Eric Porter; Hildegard Knef; Suzanna Leigh; Tony Beckley
- Cinematography: Paul Beeson
- Edited by: James Needs
- Music by: Soundtrack; Gerard Schurmann; Songs; The Peddlers
- Production companies: Hammer Films; Seven Arts Productions
- Distributed by: Warner-Pathé
- Release dates: 19 June 1968 (US); 27 July 1968 (UK)
- Running time: 91 minutes
- Country: United Kingdom
- Language: English
- Budget: Over £500,000

The Lost Continent is a 1968 British adventure film made by Hammer Films and Seven Arts featuring Eric Porter, Hildegard Knef, Suzanna Leigh, Tony Beckley, and James Cossins. The film was produced, directed and written by Michael Carreras based on Dennis Wheatley's novel Uncharted Seas (1938).

The film sees the crew and passengers of the dilapidated tramp steamer Corita heading from Freetown to Caracas. While the passengers all have their own reasons for getting out of Africa, the captain of the ship is also eager to leave, as he is smuggling a dangerous explosive cargo. Whilst en route to South America the ship is holed and eventually what is left of the crew and passengers find themselves marooned in a mist-enshrouded Sargasso Sea surrounded by killer seaweed, murderous crustaceans and previously marooned descendants of Spanish Conquistadores and pirates.

== Plot ==
On board the tramp steamer Corita, Captain Lansen ignores a hurricane warning and a customs launch whose crew want to inspect his ship, as he is smuggling the explosive "Phosphor B" ('Phosphore Blanc', i.e. white phosphorus). His ship's passengers, a mix of rich and poor, also have reasons for leaving Freetown: Dr. Webster, together with his daughter Unity, for his indiscretions with patients; alcoholic conman Harry Tyler with a jacket lined with money; Eva Peters, a wife who has stolen bearer bonds to pay for the ransom on her son in Caracas, and lawyer, Ricaldi, pursuing Eva to retrieve those stolen bonds.

An accident nearly sets off the explosives and the authority of the captain comes to a head when an anchor chain slips a gear, ruptures the bulkhead and power is lost. Some of the crew mutiny and take to a lifeboat. Chief Engineer Nick cannot repair the generator and Captain Lansen, fearing the ship may explode with Hurricane Wendy about to engulf them in a storm, takes the remaining crew and passengers into another lifeboat. In the ensuing chaos, Dr. Webster is devoured by an attacking shark.

The following morning, Lansen's lifeboat is adrift in a morass of sentient and carnivorous seaweed, which kills the cook. The lifeboat later bumps into the Corita again, and its passengers find the propellers of the tramp steamer fouled by the pullulating seaweed. Nevertheless, those in the lifeboat are forced to again take refuge in the doomed vessel. That night, Unity is attacked by a glowing-eyed Prehistoric octopus, which kills Ricaldi when he attempts to rescue her.

Sarah, a native girl from a nearby island, then appears, walking on the morass of seaweed, prevented from sinking by air buoyancy balloons attached to her shoulders and pads attached to her feet. She is being chased by fur-clad barbarians but warns Captain Lansen of an impending attack. The crew and passengers defend the Corita, with the surviving barbarians returning to a dilapidated Spanish galleon, marooned nearby. Child leader "El Supremo", the princely descendant of Spanish conquistadors, along with members of the Spanish Inquisition had ordered the attack to steal their supplies.

Sarah attempts to return to her island but is tracked down by the conquistadors. Whilst standing guard, on an outcrop of rock, the bartender is killed by a giant hermit crab, which in turn is attacked by a giant scorpion. Sarah, Harry and the ship's engineer are then captured by the Spanish, taken to the galleon and brought before "El Supremo", though it becomes obvious to all that the one standing aside and clad in 'pointy-hatted' capirote Inquisitor's clothing, is "calling all the shots" (in the guise of God's Will). Captain Lansen confronts him, stating that they will not give in to his demands or ever stop attempting to get back home. Lansen then uses the explosives to destroy the galleon and rescue his crew/passengers. Inspired by Lansen's speech and attitude, "El Supremo" abandons his throne to join them, only to be stabbed by the cleric the moment he turns his back to leave. Stripped of his power, the plague-riddled priest succumbs to kneeling and prayer, while his monks succumb to frantic pipe organ-playing as the flames erupt all around them.

Lansen and his crew, along with those Spaniards who have decided to join them, head back to the Corita. The shrouded cadaver of "El Supremo", who never recovered from his stab wound, later receives a burial at sea, with Lansen reading the Rites from the Book of Common Prayer.

== Principal cast ==
- Eric Porter as Captain Lansen
- Hildegard Knef as Eva Peters
- Suzanna Leigh as Unity Webster
- Tony Beckley as Harry Tyler
- Nigel Stock as Dr Webster
- Neil McCallum as First Officer Hemmings
- Ben Carruthers as Ricaldi
- Jimmy Hanley as Patrick, bartender
- James Cossins as Nick, the chief engineer
- Dana Gillespie as Sarah
- Darryl Read as El Supremo
- Victor Maddern as the First Mate
- Reg Lye as The Helmsman
- Norman Eshley as Jonathan
- Michael Ripper as the Sea Lawyer
- Donald Sumpter as Sparks
- Alf Joint as Jason
- Charles Houston as Braemer
- Shivendra Sinha as Hurri Curri
- Eddie Powell as The Inquisitor

== Crew ==
- Directed by Michael Carreras
- Produced by Michael Carreras
- Music by Gerard Schürmann and title song by The Peddlers
- Special effects by Robert A Mattey

== Production ==
A 175,000 gallon tank was constructed at Elstree Studios to shoot the sea scenes. The credits list Michael Nash — a pseudonym for Michael Carreras — as the screenwriter.

The production began under the direction of Leslie Norman, but he was soon replaced by Carreras. Hammer's musical director Philip Martell rejected the original film score by Benjamin Frankel and commissioned a new one from Gerard Schürmann.

This film was one of several Hammer movies that featured unusual characters and prehistoric creatures, following the tradition of One Million Years B.C.. It was rated an X when first released.

== Reception ==
According to Fox records the film required $2,025,000 in rentals to break even and by 11 December 1970 had made $1,100,000 so made a loss to the studio.

== Soundtrack ==
The opening titles have the song Lost Continent performed by The Peddlers, featured on their album Three In a Cell.

== See also ==
- The Isle of Lost Ships (1923). Also set in the Sargasso Sea.
- The Isle of Lost Ships (1929). Also set in the Sargasso Sea.
- The Boats of the "Glen Carrig" A 1907 novel with a similar premise.
