= The Final Solution (novel) =

2004 novella by Michael Chabon

- Author: Michael Chabon
- Language: English
- Genre: Mystery novel
- Publisher: Fourth Estate, an imprint of HarperCollins
- Publication date: November 9, 2004
- Publication place: United States
- Media type: Print (hardback & paperback) and audio-CD
- Pages: 144 (hardcover edition)
- ISBN: 0-06-076340-X (hardcover edition); ISBN 0-00-719603-2 (British softcover edition)
- OCLC: 55877899
- Dewey Decimal: 813/.54 22
- LC Class: PS3553.H15 F56 2004

The Final Solution: A Story of Detection is a 2004 novella by Michael Chabon. It is a detective story that in many ways pays homage to the writings of Sir Arthur Conan Doyle and other writers of the genre. The story, set in 1944, revolves around an unnamed 89-year-old long-retired detective (who may or may not be Sherlock Holmes, but is always called just "the old man"), now interested mostly in beekeeping, and his quest to find a missing parrot, the only friend of a mute Jewish boy. The title of the novella references Doyle's 1893 Sherlock Holmes story "The Final Problem" (in which Holmes confronts his greatest enemy, Professor Moriarty, at Reichenbach Falls) and the Final Solution (the Nazis' plan for the genocide of the Jewish people), as well as The Seven-Per-Cent Solution, a 1974 novel written in homage to Conan Doyle by Nicholas Meyer.

== Plot summary ==
Although the plot of the story is modelled on the classic ratiocination stories of Conan Doyle, there are two separate mysteries in the book, only one of which the Holmes character is able to solve by the end. The story opens with the description of a chance encounter between the old man and the young boy Linus Steinman, who, we find out moments later, is a German-Jewish refugee staying with a local Anglican priest and his family. Because the parrot sitting on the boy's shoulder is in the habit of rattling off German numbers in no obvious order — "zwei eins sieben fünf vier sieben drei" ("two one seven five four seven three") — the old man quickly deduces the boy's reason for being in England. After we are introduced to the priest, his wife, son and two lodgers sitting at dinner, we find out that the numbers may have some significance. One lodger speculates that the numbers are a military code of some kind and seeks to crack it. The other lodger, a Mr. Shane, from the British foreign office, pretends at dinner not to even notice the bird, which the family and Linus call Bruno. But because everyone else around the table is intensely interested in it, Shane's behavior only heightens their suspicions.

After Mr. Shane is found murdered the next morning and the parrot Bruno has gone missing, the local inspector, Michael Bellows, recruits the old man to help solve the mystery. The old man, his interest piqued by the boy's strange attachment to his bird, agrees only to find the parrot — "If we should encounter the actual murderer along the way, well, then it will be so much the better for you," he says (ending chapter 3). Although the Holmes character succeeds in that endeavor, neither he nor anyone else in the book discovers what the true meaning of the numbers are, though there are clear implications of a solution. One hint, given by the author Chabon, is that the numbers are often recited in the presence of trains: the implicit suggestion is that they are the numbers of the cars and indeed, the parrot calls it "the train song." In the final scene, the boy is reunited with the parrot in a train station and starts to speak at last as he watches a military transport train pass, reciting "sieben zwei eins vier drei," "sieben acht vier vier fünf." Another hint, revealed in the book's penultimate chapter, which is told from the perspective of Bruno, is that the boy and his parrot used to visit an Obergruppenführer while still in Germany, where it is implied he learned the song. But the biggest hint of all is the book's title and the boy's dumbness. Added to that, neither the parrot nor the boy ever voice the German numeral "null."

== Publication ==
The novella originally appeared as "The Final Solution: A Story of Detection" "in a slightly different form" in The Paris Review #166, Summer 2003. It won the 2003 Aga Khan Prize for Fiction and was reprinted in book form in November 2004.

The epigraph by Mary Jo Salter is taken from her poem "Alternating Currents", in A Kiss in Space: Poems (1999).

The book's cover and illustrations were drawn by Jay Ryan.

== Reception ==
Deborah Friedell of The New York Times described the writing as "exceptional, on par with the best, most tightly written sections of Chabon's last novel, the marvelous but uneven Amazing Adventures of Kavalier and Clay." Sam Thompson of The Guardian enjoyed Chabon's storytelling saying "The plot is slight by the standards of detective fiction but elegant, and far-reaching despite the novella's brevity...The novella gives us the delights of suspense and resolution, puzzle and solution, but the vast crime that hovers behind the story is a mystery too great for even Holmes to make sense of." Stephanie Merritt, also for The Guardian, was less enthused saying "There are some fine descriptive passages here, but neither they, nor the weight of the war-time context, ever quite banish the air of whimsy that hangs over the whole exercise."

== See also ==
- A Taste for Honey, another novel whose detective is implied to be Holmes in retirement
