= Marjorie and Men =

Television series

- Genre: Sitcom
- Written by: John Gorrie; Peter Spence
- Directed by: John Gorrie
- Starring: Patricia Routledge; Patricia Hayes; James Cossins
- Composer: Richard Harvey
- Country of origin: United Kingdom
- Original language: English
- No. of series: 1
- No. of episodes: 6

Production
- Producer: John Rosenberg
- Running time: 30 minutes
- Production company: Anglia Television

Original release
- Network: ITV
- Release: 28 June – 2 August 1985

Marjorie and Men is a British comedy television series that originally aired on ITV in 1985. A recently divorced woman tries to revive her love life while living with her meddling mother.

== Main cast ==
- Patricia Routledge as Marjorie Belton
- Patricia Hayes as Alice Tripp
- James Cossins as Henry Bartlett
- Ronnie Stevens as Sid Parkin
- Jeanne Watts as Beryl
- Michelle Collins as Debbie

== Bibliography ==
- Maxford, Howard. Hammer Complete: The Films, the Personnel, the Company. McFarland, 2018.
- Newcomb, Horace . Encyclopedia of Television. Routledge, 2014.
