= James Cossins =

British actor (1933–1997)

- Born: 4 December 1933; Beckenham, Kent, England
- Died: 12 February 1997 (aged 63); Hampshire, England
- Occupation: Actor
- Years active: 1962–1994

James Cossins (4 December 1933 – 12 February 1997) was an English actor. Born in Beckenham, Kent, he became widely recognised as the abrupt, bewildered Mr Walt in the Fawlty Towers episode "The Hotel Inspectors" and as Mr Watson, the frustrated Public Relations training course instructor, in an episode of Some Mothers Do 'Ave 'Em.

== Early life ==
Cossins was born in Beckenham and educated at the City of London School. After serving in the Royal Air Force, he trained, and he won the silver medal at Royal Academy of Dramatic Art, graduating in 1951.

== Career ==
Cossins first appeared in repertory theatre and at the Nottingham Playhouse. He played a wide range of characters throughout his colourful and extensive career on television and stage, often portraying blustering, pompous, crusty and cantankerous characters. Cossins appeared in Charley's Aunt at the Apollo Theatre in 1971 with Tom Courtenay, David Horovitch, Garth Forwood, Joanna McCallum, and Celia Bannerman. He appeared in more than forty films, including The Anniversary, (recreating his West End stage role), and The Lost Continent (both 1968), Gandhi (1982), and The Man with the Golden Gun (1974).

He played a magistrate in episodes of four different British sitcoms, Whatever Happened to the Likely Lads?, The Good Life, Citizen Smith, and Minder.. He also starred in The Likely Lads, Bergerac, The Sweeney, Bless This House, Shadows, All Creatures Great and Small, Just William,L for Lester, He played Neville Dennis in Callan "Rules of the Game" (1972), Z-Cars, and as the regular character Bruce Westrop (in 1979) in Emmerdale Farm. He also played Major Bagstock in Dombey and Son (1983), and appeared in the first series of All in Good Faith in 1985.

Cossins's later appearances were limited by ill health and he lived in semi-retirement in Surrey. Cossins died from heart disease at the age of 63, in 1997.

== Filmography ==
=== Film ===
- Darling (1965) as Basildon
- The Deadly Bees (1966) as Coroner
- Privilege (1967) as Professor Tatham
- How I Won the War (1967) as Drogue
- The Anniversary (1968) as Henry Taggart
- A Dandy in Aspic (1968) as Heston-Stevas
- The Lost Continent (1968) as Nick, Chief Engineer
- Otley (1968) as Geffcock
- Scrooge (1970) as Party Guest
- The Horror of Frankenstein (1970) as Dean
- The Rise and Rise of Michael Rimmer (1970) as Crodder
- Wuthering Heights (1970) as Mr. Linton
- Say Hello to Yesterday (1971) as Policeman
- Melody (1971) as Headmaster
- Villain (1971) as Brown
- Blood from the Mummy's Tomb (1971) as Older Male Nurse
- Death Line (1972) as James Manfred, OBE
- Fear in the Night (1972) as The Doctor
- Follow Me! (1972) as Party Guest
- Young Winston (1972) as Barnsby
- Bequest to the Nation (1973) as McKillop - HMS Victory
- Hitler: The Last Ten Days (1973) as German Officer
- The Man with the Golden Gun (1974) as Colthorpe
- The First Great Train Robbery (1979) as Harranby
- Loophole (1981) as 1st Interviewer
- Sphinx (1981) as Lord Carnarvon
- Gandhi (1982) as Brigadier
- Immaculate Conception (1992) as Godfrey

== Television ==
- The Dangerous Game (1958, 1 episode) as Auctioneer
- Saturday Playhouse (1959, 1 episode) as Frank Coppin
- Theatre Night (1961, 1 episode) as Edgar Lucas, the bride's father
- The Caucasian Chalk Circle (1962, 3 episodes) as Schauwa
- Z-Cars (1962-1963, 11 episodes) as Sergeant Michaelson
- Compact (1963, 13 episodes) as Newcastle Pope
- Armchair Theatre (1963-1973, 3 episodes) as Partridge
- ITV Television Playhouse (1963, 1 episode) as Hilliard
- The Sullavan Brothers (1965, 1 episode) as Maurice Ashley
- Londoners (1965, 1 episode) as The interviewer
- No Hiding Place (1965, 1 episode) as 'Muddy' Waters
- Coronation Street (1965, 1 episode) as Interviewer
- The Man in Room 17 (1965, 1 episode) as Harry Morrison
- Legend of Death (1965, 4 episodes) as Irwin
- The Likely Lads (1965-1966, 2 epsidoes) as Scoutmaster/Vicar
- Mystery and Imagination (1966, 1 episode) as Landlord
- The Power Game (1966-1969, 2 episodes) as Henry Outram/Candleford
- Theatre 625 (1966, 1 episode) as Henry
- The Fellows (1967, 1 episode) as Visitor
- Out of the Unknown (1967, 1 episode) as Interviewer
- The Contenders (1969, 1 episode) as Bloater
- Strange Report (1969, 1 episode) as Churchill
- Dr. Finlay's Casebook (1969, 1 episode) as Robbie Cannock
- The ITV Play (1969, 1 episode) as Mr. Peachham
- The Avengers (1969, 1 episode) as Henry
- Paul Temple (1970, 1 episode) as Inspector Lescoe
- The Wednesday Play (1970, 1 episode) as Colonel Jones-William
- Thirty-Minute Theatre (1970, 1 episode) as Tim Singleton
- Dear Mother...Love Albert (1970-1972, 2 episodes) as S.M.N. Beanstock/Col. Tomlinson
- Special Branch (1970, 1 episode) as Det. Sgt. Davis
- Menace (1970, 1 episode) as Controller
- Bless This House (1971, 1 episode) as Tom Williams
- The Ten Commandments (1971, 1 episode) as Tom
- Bel Ami (1971, 4 episodes) as Forestier
- The Rivals of Sherlock Holmes (1971, 1 episode) as . Dr. Jervis
- Play for Today (1971, 3 episodes) as Jeremy
- Callan (1972, 1 episode) as Neville Dennis
- Pretenders (1972, 13 episodes) as Old Elam
- The Incredible Robert Baldick: Never Come Nigh (1972, 1 episode) as Rev. Peter Elmstead
- Man at the Top (1972, 1 episode) as Colonel Broadhurst
- A Day Out (1972, TV film) as Shorter
- Crown Court (1973, 3 episodes) as Graham Erringburn
- Thriller (1973, 1 episode) as Kellet
- Harriet's Back in Town (1973, 2 episodes) as Arthur
- Marked Personal (1973, 2 episodes) as J.C. Smart
- Van der Valk (1973, 1 episode) as Noordhoff
- Some Mothers Do 'Ave 'Em (1973, 1 episode) as Watson
- Whatever Happened to the Likely Lads? (1974, 1 episode) as a Magistrate
- Fall of Eagles (1974, 1 episode) as Count Josi Hoyos
- The Pallisers (1974, 2 episodes) as Sergeant Bunfit
- Justice (1974, 1 episode) as Mr. Ritson
- The Double Dealers (1974, 1 episode) as Sir Julian
- Good Girl (1974, 1 episode) as Manager
- Oh No, It's Selwyn Froggitt (1974, 1 episode) as Chairman
- Notorious Woman (1974, 1 episode) as Gustave Flaubert
- Centre Play (1975, 1 episode) as Burret
- Churchill's People (1975, 1 episode) as William
- Fawlty Towers (1975, 1 episode) as Mr. Walt
- Shadows (1975, 1 episode) as Custodian
- The Good Life (1976, 1 episode) as Magistrate
- Jackanory (1976, 6 episodes) as Storyteller
- Love Thy Neighbour (1976, 1 episode) as George Brittain
- One-Upmanship (1976, 1 episode)
- Shades of Greene (1976, 1 episode) as . Shop assistant
- The Sweeney (1976, 1 episode) as Col. Rosier
- Don't Forget to Write! (1977-1979, 3 episodes) as Phillip Mounter
- Bernie (1978, 2 episodes) as Various parts
- The Devil's Crown (1978, 1 episode) as Hugues de Lusignan
- Just William (1978, 1 episode) as Uncle Frederick
- Prince Regent (1979, 1 episode) as Sir Robert Gifford
- All Creatures Great and Small (1980, 1988, 2 episodes) as Aloysius Barge
- Citizen Smith (1980, 1 episode) as Judge
- The Jim Davidson Show (1980, 1 episode) as Various parts
- Jukes of Piccadilly (1980, 2 episodes) as Geoffrey Martindale
- Why Didn't They Ask Evans? (1980, TV film) as Henry Bassington-ffrench
- Bergerac (1981, 2 episodes) as Tuchel/Calhoun
- Roger Doesn't Live Here Anymore (1981, 2 episodes) as Baxter
- Shelley (1981, 1 episode) as Bernard Nelson
- Timon of Athens (1981, TV film) as Lucullus
- Winston Churchill: The Wilderness Years (1981, 1 episode) as Lord Lothian
- The Confessions of Felix Krull (1982, 5 episodes) as Lord Kilmarnock
- L for Lester (1982, 6 episodes) as Chief Insp. Rodgers
- Minder (1982, 1 episode) as Judge
- Dombey and Son (1983, 5 episodes) as Major Bagstock
- Goodnight and God Bless (1983, 6 episodes) as Geoffrey
- Nanny (1983, 1 episode) as Mr. Croome
- Number 10 (1983, 1 episode) as Lord Harcourt
- The Lady Is a Tramp (1984, 1 episode) as Man
- The Masks of Death (1984, TV film) as Frederick Baines
- Sharing Time (1984, 1 episode) as Arthur
- Strangers and Brothers (1984, 3 episodes) as Mr. Knight
- All in Good Faith (1985, 5 episodes) as Major Andrews
- My Brother Jonathan (1985, 2 episodes) as Reverend Perry
- Marjorie and Men (1985, 4 episodes) as Henry Bartlett
- The Pickwick Papers (1985, 1 episode) as Nupkins
- Up the Elephant and Round the Castle (1985, 1 episode) as The Major
- Call Me Mister (1986, 1 episode) as Charlie Staples
- Miss Marple (1987, ' At Bertram's Hotel ', episode) as Colonel Luscombe
- Grand Larceny (1987, TV film)
- Rude Health (1988, 1 episode) as Col. Jardine
- Chelworth (1989, 2 episodes) as Mr. Kilbeck
- Woof! (1990, 1 episode) as Mr. Hudson
- Murder Most Horrid (1991, 1 episode) as Sir Hugh Lotterby
- Adam Dalgliesh (1993, 1 episode) as Justin Bryce
- Under the Hammer (1994, 1 episode) as Meredith Bland
