= The Fiend (film) =

1972 British film by Robert Hartford-Davis

- Theatrical release poster
- Directed by: Robert Hartford-Davis
- Written by: Brian Comport
- Produced by: Robert Hartford-Davis
- Starring: Ann Todd; Tony Beckley; Patrick Magee
- Cinematography: Desmond Dickinson
- Edited by: Alan Pattillo
- Music by: Richard Kerr; Tony Osborne
- Distributed by: Miracle Films
- Release date: May 1972
- Running time: 98 minutes
- Country: United Kingdom
- Language: English

The Fiend (also known as Beware My Brethren) is a 1972 British horror film produced and directed by Robert Hartford-Davis and starring Ann Todd, Tony Beckley and Patrick Magee. It was written by Brian Comport. The film is set against a background of religious fanaticism and, as with other films directed by Hartford-Davis, includes elements of the sexploitation genre of the early 1970s.

== Plot ==
Widow Birdy Wemys has become a devoted member of a fundamentalist fire-and-brimstone religious sect called "the Brethren", led by the charismatic Minister. Birdy has turned her sizeable home over to the Brethren for use as a church and a recruiting ground, and her son Kenny has also fallen under their spell. Kenny is a troubled individual, dominated by his overbearing mother, introverted and socially inept. He has taken the teachings of the Minister to heart, and feels repulsed by what he sees as sin, lust and temptation being openly flaunted by the young women he sees as he goes about his daily business.

The film opens with shots of a terrified young woman in a mini skirt fleeing for her life along a riverbank, interspersed with scenes of a Brethren baptism service in full swing complete with gospel-style music and the congregation working itself into a religious frenzy. The girl is finally cornered by her unseen pursuer, strangled, stripped naked and thrown into the river at the same time as a boy is symbolically submerged during the baptism service.

Kenny works two jobs, as a part-time lifeguard at a public swimming pool and a night-time security guard. He returns from his nightshift to morning newspaper headlines screaming "Third Nude Body Found!" He later goes to the swimming pool, where he sees it as part of his job description to berate female bathers for the skimpiness of their attire. Birdy meanwhile is in failing health; a diabetic, she is dependent on insulin to control her condition but has to obtain supplies surreptitiously as the use of medicine is strictly forbidden by the Brethren's beliefs. A local nurse, Brigitte, is hired to care for Birdy, against Birdy's wishes, and becomes alarmed at what she sees of the Brethren. She passes on her concerns to her sister Paddy, a campaigning journalist eager to write an exposé of religious cults. In order to infiltrate the Brethren, Paddy decides to pose as an unmarried expectant mother seeking God's forgiveness and redemption from her sins.

Kenny descends into a frenzy of killing. One day at the pool, he is outraged when a young woman removes her bikini top and later follows her home to exact retribution for her Godless ways. While on his nocturnal beat he stumbles across a prostitute servicing a client, and she too is brutally despatched. Naked female bodies turn up across London in bizarre circumstances, dropping out of a cement mixer or dangling from a meat hook.

Birdy takes such a shine to Paddy that the Minister begins to suspect a suppressed lesbian attraction. Accusing Birdy of "foul thoughts", he orders her to fast in order to cleanse her soul. Birdy slips into a diabetic coma and Paddy attempts desperately to administer an insulin shot, but is accidentally locked in the cellar by Kenny. Kenny locates a supply of insulin and rushes to his mother, but it is too late and she dies. In his grief Kenny finally finds the courage to stand up to the Minister. Having confessed his identity as the Nude Killer, he exacts vengeance by leaving the Minister crucified in his own church.

== Cast ==
- Ann Todd as Birdy Wemys
- Tony Beckley as Kenny Wemys
- Patrick Magee as minister
- Suzanna Leigh as Paddy Lynch
- Madeleine Hinde as Brigitte Lynch
- Percy Herbert as commissionaire
- David Lodge as CID Inspector
- Ronald Allen as Paul
- Maxine Barrie as singer
- Jeannette Wild as prostitute
- Diana Chappell as poolside girl
- Hani Borelle as riverside girl
- Susanna East as teenage girl

== Critical reception ==
Monthly Film Bulletin wrote: "Certain brief fragments of the Fiend recall the glossy, sadistic Anglo-Amalgamated movies of the late Fifties (like Crabtree's Horrors of the Black Museum or Powell's Peeping Tom), but Robert Hartford-Davis' flat and colourless direction utterly lacks the panache of that cycle, and the brief thematic promise that the film will develop into a study of voyeurism, along Powell lines, is never fulfilled. Instead we are treated to some agonisingly unconvincing glimpses of the cranky religious sect which is supposed to have initiated the psychosis in mother and son, while the 'Freudian' motivation is served up in the form of a few crass flashbacks to Kenny as a child on his mother's knee. A generally good cast, including Ann Todd and Patrick Magee, do the best they can under the circumstances, but the odds are all against them, especially since most of the film is constructed in a series of ugly, staccato close-ups."

Brian Orndorf of Blu-ray.com wrote that the film "begins with a blast, but soon settles into a series of tedious encounters and dull supporting characters", and that it "[comes] across as a television movie that's occasionally interrupted by scenes of violence and nudity."

== Releases ==
The Fiend as originally released runs for 98 minutes, but an edited version of 87 minutes (removing most of its more graphic content) was produced for the American market.

The film was released on DVD in 2005; however the DVD uses the cut version.

In November 2018, the film was restored in 2K and released on DVD and Blu-ray by Vinegar Syndrome.
