= Sidney Cohen =

- Born: June 7, 1910; New York City
- Died: May 8, 1987 (aged 76); Santa Monica, California
- Education: Columbia University, City College of New York, University of Bonn

Sidney Cohen, MD (June 7, 1910 – May 8, 1987) was an American psychiatrist, professor of medicine, and author, known as a leading expert on LSD, cannabis, cocaine, and other psychoactive drugs.

== Biography ==
Cohen was born in New York City in 1910, and graduated from Columbia University as a pharmacist in 1930. After study at the City College of New York, he then studied medicine in Germany, where he received in 1938 his medical degree from the University of Bonn. He did his medical internship at Queens General Hospital in New York City. After completing his internship he joined the U.S. Army Medical Corps, extensively participated in the World War II Pacific campaign, and was eventually promoted to colonel. (He served as a colonel in the U.S. Army Reserves until he retired from the Army in 1963.) After the end of World War II, he completed his residency at Wadsworth VA Hospital in Los Angeles. At Wadsworth VA Hospital, he became the chief of psychiatric service. There he was the Assistant Chief of Medical Service from 1948 to 1960. When UCLA's medical school was started in the late 1940s, many Wadsworth VA physicians served as faculty. At the UCLA School of Medicine, Cohen became in 1954 a faculty member and served as an associate clinical professor until 1970. From 1968 to 1970 he was on academic leave of absence when he was appointed by Richard Nixon in 1968 as the first director of the NIMH's Division of Narcotic Abuse and Drug Addiction. Cohen returned to the UCLA School of Medicine in 1970 when he was promoted to clinical professor. He was the author or co-author of a number of books and over 300 articles.

In the 1950s he was a pioneer in research on LSD. He did research on barbiturates, amphetamines, and tranquilizers, as well as hallucinogens.

Sidney Cohen is perhaps most well-known in popular culture for LSD experiments he conducted with Keith Ditman, Betty Eisner and Gerald Heard, based on correspondence with Humphrey Osmond, in the mid-1950s. Cohen also conducted a number of very loosely-controlled experiments with LSD, resulting in descriptions of LSD experiences. Cohen provided LSD to Clare Boothe Luce and Bill Wilson, founder of Alcoholics Anonymous, among numerous others. After becoming convinced that use of LSD could be dangerous, particularly if unsupervised, Cohen maintained a public anti-LSD stance and sometimes testy discourse with Timothy Leary.

Cohen also provided the LSD used by Aldous Huxley in his deathbed experience and advocated LSD research, particularly for the terminally ill, until his own death in 1987.

Upon his death in Santa Monica he was survived by his widow, Ilse, a daughter, Dorothy, and a son, Richard.

== Selected publications ==
=== as author ===
- Beyond within: the LSD story. New York: Atheneum. 1964; foreword by Gardner Murphy
- Drugs of hallucination. Martin Secker & Warburg. 1965.
- with Richard Alpert: LSD. New York: New American Library. 1966; foreword and photography by Lawrence Schiller
- Drug dilemma. New York: McGraw-Hill. 1968.
- Cocaine today. New York: American Council on Marijuana and other Psychoactive Drugs. 1981.
- with Donald P. Tashkin: Marijuana smoking and its effects on the lungs. New York: American Council on Marijuana and Other Psychoactive Drugs. 1981.
- The Substance Abuse Problems. New York: Haworth Press. 1981; xiii+392 pages
- with Therese Andrysiak: Therapeutic potential of marijuana's components. Rockville, Md.: American Council on Marijuana and Other Psychoactive Drugs. 1982.
- The Alcoholism Problems: Selected Issues. New York: Haworth Press. 1983. ISBN 9780866562096.
- with Robert O'Brien: Encyclopedia of understanding alcohol and other drugs. New York: Facts on File. 1984. ISBN 0871966905.
- Cocaine: the bottom line, Rockville, Md.: American Council for Drug Education, 1985
- Chemical brain: the neurochemistry of addictive disorders. Irvine, Calif.: CareInstitute. 1988; forewords by Robert L. DuPont and David E. Smith

=== as editor ===
- Diagnosis and treatment of drug and alcohol abuse. New York: Haworth Press. 1986; consulting editor, James F. Callahan
