= The Incredible Robert Baldick =

The Incredible Robert Baldick is a 1972 BBC drama that formed part of the third season of Drama Playhouse, the BBC's launching pad for potential series (the first and second seasons had already seen pilot episodes make it to full runs with Codename, The Befrienders, The Regiment and The Onedin Line). It marked the return to the BBC drama department, for the first time in six years, of writer Terry Nation. His last completed piece of work for the BBC before this, had been his work on the Doctor Who story The Daleks' Master Plan in 1965. After that he had worked for ITV/ITC film series including The Avengers, The Saint, The Baron, The Champions and Department S.

The pilot episode was entitled "Never Come Night" and was produced by Anthony Coburn, and directed by Cyril Coke. The drama was described as 'Victorian Gothic Suspense'. Robert Baldick, played by Robert Hardy, was an eccentric dilettante scientist/detective, possessed of a personal steam locomotive, The Tsar, originally built for Tsar Nicholas II of Russia, complete with armour plating, bulletproof glass and an on-board laboratory.

The programme was scheduled to be shown on Wednesday 6 September 1972 but, in the immediate aftermath of the Munich massacre, the production was removed at the last moment. The programme was finally shown on 2 October 1972, but despite achieving 6.6 million viewers and mainly positive feedback - (Clive James for example in The Observer; "The Incredible Robert Baldick should rate like mad: it's a kind of take-home Hammer film wrapped in silver foil. The well-heeled hero is a piece of nineteenth-century fuzz dedicated to fighting evil in its more occult manifestations. He steams about in a special train.") - the pilot did not lead to the BBC commissioning a full series. That honour went instead to Sutherland's Law and The Venturers.

== Cast ==
- Robert Hardy as Doctor Sir Robert Baldick
- Julian Holloway as Thomas Wingham
- John Rhys-Davies as Caleb Selling
- James Cossins as Peter Elmstead
- Reginald Marsh as Charles Aldington
- Barry Andrews as Seth Marden
- Anna Martine as Sarah Chislet/child's voice
- Paul Humpoletz as Walter Sturry
- Ron Welling as Daniel Pluckly
- Dave Mobley as Mr. Lenham
