= Tony Beckley =

English actor (1929–1980)

- Beckley in The Italian Job (1969)
- Born: Derek Anthony Beckley; 7 October 1929; Southampton, Hampshire, England
- Died: 19 April 1980 (aged 50); Los Angeles, California, U.S.
- Resting place: Hollywood Forever Cemetery
- Occupation: Actor

Derek Anthony Beckley (7 October 1929 – 19 April 1980) was an English actor. A graduate of the Royal Academy of Dramatic Art, Beckley went on to carve out a career on film and television throughout the 1960s and 1970s, often playing villainous roles, as well as being a veteran of numerous stage productions.

== Early life ==
Beckley was born in Southampton, Hampshire. He was a child out of wedlock and never met his father. His mother, Beatrice Mitchell, worked as a stewardess on ocean liners such as the RMS Mauretania and the RMS Aquitania. Due to work commitments, she was often away, and Beckley was brought up mainly by another woman whom he referred to as his aunt.

When he was five years old, Beckley and his mother moved to Portsmouth and when the Second World War broke out he was sent to Winchester, where he attended boarding school at Winton House. It was in Winchester where he first became interested in acting. While his mother wanted him to do "something nice and safe", like working in the civil service, Beckley discovered that acting was what was going to make him happy when he saw a performance in Portsmouth of Emlyn Williams' The Corn Is Green by the Court Players, a local repertory company.

Beckley left school at the age of 16 in pursuit of his acting career. He worked as a stage sweeper and tea maker for two or three months, then moved to London. As he could not get work in the theatre, he did odd jobs as a waiter and in an ice cream factory while spending his spare time watching actors like Laurence Olivier, Ralph Richardson and Alec Guinness and the Old Vic productions at the New Theatre.

Shortly before turning 18, he joined the Royal Navy and spent two years as a seaman aboard the destroyer HMS Scorpion, where he found the time to prepare for admission to the Royal Academy of Dramatic Art (RADA). He joined RADA on an ex-Navy grant and during his two-year training befriended people such as actress Sheila Hancock and playwright Charles Laurence.

== Career ==
After graduating from RADA, Beckley started working for various provincial repertory companies, eventually settling with a company near London (Bromley Repertory) which opened up opportunities for television work. After guest roles in popular TV series such as Sergeant Cork, The Saint, Z-Cars and the then revolutionary comedy programme Dig This Rhubarb Beckley made his film debut in 1965 as Ned Poins in Orson Welles' Chimes at Midnight.

Beckley appeared in a number of films for director Peter Collinson: The Penthouse (1967); The Long Day's Dying (1968); and most memorably as Camp Freddie in The Italian Job (1969). His only starring role was as the psychotic Kenny Wemys in The Fiend (1972), and he made his last film appearance in 1979 playing another psychopath in When a Stranger Calls. His other films include The Lost Continent (1968), Get Carter (1971), Assault (1971), Sitting Target (1972), Gold (1974), and Revenge of the Pink Panther (1978).

On television, Beckley played the villainous Harrison Chase in the six-part Doctor Who serial The Seeds of Doom (1976). He also guest-starred on shows such as Manhunt, Callan, Jason King, and Special Branch.

He remained active in the theatre, appearing in the West End in Tennessee Williams' Small Craft Warnings with Elaine Stritch and in Snap with Maggie Smith.

== Death ==
Beckley died six months after the premiere of When a Stranger Calls. Just before his death he had been signed for further work in the US. He was supposed to co-star with Elizabeth Montgomery in a television movie titled My Fat Friend and appear in a film, American Dreamer. He was also to appear in the NBC miniseries Beulah Land alongside Lesley Ann Warren, Don Johnson and others.

Though the cause of his death was given as cancer, it appeared rather "mysterious" and according to his friend Sheila Hancock, it may have been AIDS-related, a disease then little understood. Beckley died at the Medical Center of the University of California in Los Angeles and is buried at the Hollywood Forever Cemetery.

== Personal life ==
In an interview in 1979, Beckley stated that there was nothing in his background to explain why he became an actor except for possibly "a desire for some attention, which I really didn't get much as a kid."

While often playing villains and psychopaths on screen, Beckley is described as friendly and funny by people who met him and as someone who could tell a good story. Beckley remarked that he would be surprised if people could find anything psychotic in his behaviour.

For more than 15 years, Beckley was in a relationship with film producer Barry Krost. When Krost opened his own management company, Beckley became his first client. Krost also produced Beckley's last film When a Stranger Calls and was a production associate on The Penthouse.

Although he kept a house in Fulham, London, and had three dogs, Beckley spent time living in California during the last year of his life in an apartment in West Hollywood.

== Filmography ==
=== Film ===
Year	Title	Role	Notes
1964	East Lynne	Richard Hare	TV film
1965	Chimes at Midnight	Ned Poins	
1967	The Penthouse	Tom	
1968	The Long Day's Dying	Cliff	
1968	The Lost Continent	Harry Tyler	
1969	The Italian Job	Camp Freddie	
1971	Get Carter	Peter the Dutchman	
1971	Assault	Leslie Sanford	
1972	The Fiend	Kenny Wemys	
1972	Sitting Target	Soapy Tucker	
1974	Gold	Stephen Marais	
1974	Diagnosis: Murder	Sergeant Greene	
1978	Revenge of the Pink Panther	Guy Algo	
1979	When a Stranger Calls	Curt Duncan	

=== Television ===
Year	Title	Role	Notes
1958	ITV Television Playhouse	Mr. Roberts	Episode: "Miss Em"
1958	BBC Sunday Night Theatre	Earl of Pembroke	Episode: "Till Time Shall End"
1963	Suspense	Hugo	Episode: "Sense of Occasion"
1963	The Saint	Barry Aldon	Episode: "Marcia"
1963	The Saint	John Kennett	Episode: "The Saint Plays with Fire"
1963	ITV Play of the Week	Dolokhov	Episode: "War and Peace"
1963	ITV Play of the Week	Vi	Episode: "The Kidnapping of Mary Smith"
1963	Sergeant Cork	Steve Gurling	Episode: "The Case of the Two Drowned Men"
1963-1964	Dig This Rhubarb		Series regular
1964	Z-Cars	Mr. Fry	Episode: "Whistle and Come Home"
1964	The Great War	Various roles	5 episodes
1964	Sergeant Cork	Les Bartlett	Episode: "The Case of the Wounded Warder"
1965	Knock on Any Door	Harry Benson	Episode: "First Offender"
1965	ITV Play of the Week	Montgiron	Episode: "The Corsican Brothers"
1966	Sergeant Cork	Alex Devere	Episode: "The Case of a Lady's Good Name"
1966	Conflict	Caius Cassius	Episode: "Julius Caesar"
1966	Conflict	Young Marlow	Episode: "She Stoops to Conquer"
1966	ITV Sunday Night Drama	Teilo	Episode: "Four Triumphant: St David"
1968	ITV Playhouse	Roger Bakewell	Episode: "Murder: The Dancing Man"
1970	Kate	J.K.	Episode: "Say It with Flowers"
1970	Parkin's Patch	Curry	Episode: "The Journey"
1970	Manhunt	Hochler	2 episodes
1970	Callan	Rene Joinville	Episode: "Suddenly-At Home"
1971	Now Take My Wife	Tom	Episode: "A Python Called Monty"
1972	Jason King	Giorgio	Episode: "Toki"
1973	Arthur of the Britons	Morged	Episode: "The Swordsman"
1974	Special Branch	Helmut Rehfuss	Episode: "Catherine the Great"
1975	Ten from the Twenties	Dick Wilkes	Episode: "Two or Three Graces"
1976	Doctor Who	Harrison Chase	Episodes: The Seeds of Doom
1976	Little Lord Fauntleroy	Braxton	Miniseries
1977	The Velvet Glove	Otto Mayer	Episode: "Happy in War"
1977	The Cost of Loving	Leonard Draper	Episode: "The Assailants"

=== Radio ===
- 1968 - Movie-Go-Round

=== Stage ===
- ??? - Five Finger Exercise
- 1950s - Eden's End
- 1956 - The Caine Mutiny Court-Martial
- 1957 - The Rivals
- 1957 - Look Back in Anger
- 1957 - The Teahouse of the August Moon
- 1957 - Night of the Ding-Dong
- 1958 - Brothers-in-Law
- 1958 - Jack and the Bean Stalk
- 1959 - Wolf's Clothing
- 1959 - The Entertainer
- 1959 - Bus Stop (as producer)
- 1959 - The Long and the Short and the Tall
- 1960 - Two for the See-Saw (as director)
- 1960 - The Taming of the Shrew
- 1960 - Saint Joan
- 1960 - Time Limit
- 1961 - S. for Scandal
- 1961 - The Merchant of Venice (as producer)
- 1961 - Mother
- 1962 - The Bed Bug
- 1962 - Arden of Faversham
- 1962 - Diary of a Scoundrel
- 1962 - Infanticide in the House of Fred Ginger
- 1966 - Lorca
- 1969 - Hedda Gabler
- 1969 - Cages
- 1973 - Small Craft Warnings
- 1974 - Snap
- 1974 - The Dog Beneath the Skin
