= A Taste for Honey =

1941 novel by Gerald Heard

- First edition
- Author: H. F. Heard
- Language: English
- Published: 1941
- Publisher: Cassell (UK); Vanguard Press (US)
- Publication place: United Kingdom
- Media type: Print (hardcover)
- Followed by: Reply Paid

A Taste for Honey is a 1941 mystery novel by H. F. Heard.

== Background ==
A Taste for Honey was the first of three novels Heard wrote about a Mr. Mycroft, strongly implied to be an elderly Sherlock Holmes in retirement on the Sussex Downs. The novel's two sequels are Reply Paid (1945) and The Notched Hairpin (1949). Heard also wrote two short stories featuring the detective for Ellery Queen's Mystery Magazine: "Mr. Montalba, Obsequist" (September 1945) and "The Enchanted Garden" (March 1949).

== Reception ==
Christopher Morley called A Taste for Honey the only worthwhile Sherlock Holmes sequel, adding that it was "engaging and terrifying". Raymond Chandler called the book "a very clever thriller".

Vladimir Nabokov expressed enthusiasm for the novel, stating in a letter to his friend, the critic Edmund Wilson: "I was lying on my bed groaning ... yearning for a good detective story—and at that very moment the Taste for Honey sailed in. ... Mary [McCarthy] was right, I enjoyed it hugely." Nabokov, an expert in entomology, also noted that the author got facts about butterflies in the novel wrong.

== Adaptations ==
On 22 February 1955, the American Broadcasting Company presented "Sting of Death", an adaptation of the novel starring Boris Karloff as Mr. Mycroft, as an episode of The Elgin TV Hour.

The novel was loosely adapted into a 1967 British horror film, The Deadly Bees, directed by Freddie Francis. Robert Bloch, who admired the novel, kept closely to it in his original screenplay; however, before production began, the screenplay was heavily rewritten by Anthony Marriott, removing most connections with the book.

== See also ==
- The Final Solution, another novel whose detective is implied to be Holmes in retirement
