= The President of the United States, Detective =

Science fiction/mystery story by H. F. Heard

The President of the United States, Detective is a science fiction/mystery short story by H. F. Heard. It was originally published in Ellery Queen's Mystery Magazine in March 1947, and subsequently republished in Ellery Queen's Mystery Magazine in April 1969 and February 1991, in the 1949 anthology The Queen's Awards, and in the 1975 anthology Ellery Queen's The Golden 13; as well, an extended version, named "The Thaw Plan", was published in Heard's 1948 collection The Lost Cavern and Other Stories of the Fantastic.

== Synopsis ==
When aerial photography reveals that the Soviet Union is constructing multiple inland harbors, the President of the United States realizes that the Soviets are planning to use nuclear weapons to melt the Arctic ice pack and tundra, thereby causing a sea level rise at the end of which all the new Soviet harbors will be coastal—and all non-Soviet territories will be flooded. To counter this, the President orders that Antarctica and Greenland be bombarded with nuclear weapons as well, to remove the ice and enable the Western world to relocate to the now-temperate continents.

== Reception ==
"President" won the Ellery Queen's Mystery Magazine annual contest for best short story, an award which came with a $3,000 prize — although Frederic Dannay later admitted that "(a)lmost without exception, readers and critics disapproved of the story". The Glasgow Herald called it a "stand-out" and "stupendous"; however, The Encyclopedia of Science Fiction considers it "eccentric".

The story has been cited as an early example of geoengineering in fiction.
