= Trabuco College =

- Monastery in California
- Interactive map of Trabuco College
- Coordinates: 33.6735°N 117.61°W
- Country: United States
- State: California

Trabuco College was an American retreat center founded by Gerald Heard early in the Human Potential Movement near the community of Trabuco Canyon, California. Although it only operated from 1942 to 1949, it is cited as an inspiration for the Esalen Institute and is now owned and operated as the Ramakrishna Monastery by the Vedanta Society of Southern California (which is part of the Ramakrishna Order of India). The Ramakrishna Monastery now includes several buildings and covers 40 acres (160,000 m^{2}) on the slopes of the Santa Ana Mountains near O'Neill Regional Park.
