= Betty Eisner =

American psychologist (1915–2004)

- Born: September 29, 1915
- Died: July 1, 2004 (aged 88)
- Known for: Work with LSD and other psychedelic drugs, psychedelic-assisted psychotherapy

Betty Grover Eisner (September 29, 1915 – July 1, 2004) was an American psychologist known for pioneering the use of LSD and other psychedelic drugs as adjuncts to psychotherapy.

== Early life and education ==
Eisner grew up in Kansas City, Missouri, where she graduated from the Sunset Hill School in 1933. She earned her undergraduate degree in political science from Stanford University in 1937. During World War II, she served as a Red Cross volunteer. After the war, she traveled across Europe, an experience she documented in a series of letters to the Los Angeles Times. After returning to the U.S., she earned a Ph.D. in clinical psychology from the University of California, Los Angeles.

== Professional life ==
Eisner conducted psychotherapy research, first with Sidney Cohen at the Neuropsychiatric Hospital Veterans Administration Center in Los Angeles and, later, from her private practice in Los Angeles. Eisner authored a book, The Unused Potential of Marriage and Sex, which was published in 1970. She also helped found The School for Learning, which taught English in Mexico. In the 1990s, she maintained a private practice in Santa Monica, California, occasionally publishing articles on psychotherapy and serving on the board of advisors for the Albert Hofmann Foundation. In 2002, Eisner wrote an unpublished autobiographical account of her career entitled Remembrances of LSD Therapy Past.

== LSD research ==
Throughout her career, Eisner had made significant contributions to the field of psychedelic research. She conducted early research into the use of LSD to treat alcoholism and maintained an active interest in hallucinogens throughout her career. Along with Sidney Cohen, Eisner appears to have originated the practice of using simultaneous male and female therapists or researchers during human hallucinogen administration. Eisner was a therapist for Bill Wilson, co-founder of Alcoholics Anonymous, when he tried LSD. In addition to using hallucinogens like LSD and mescaline in psychedelic therapy, Eisner also gave stimulants such as methylphenidate and the inhaled gas mixture carbogen to her patients.

However, Eisner's interest in finding new tools for psychotherapy was not limited to drugs. Eisner was particularly focused on extra-pharmacological variables that she felt influenced outcome of psychotherapeutic sessions. She considered the specific individuals present as an important variable in therapeutic outcome and sometimes conducted sessions in group settings. Some of these group sessions included "encounter group"-style expression and body work. Eisner also described the psychotherapeutic importance of a variable she called 'matrix.' This term encompassed the everyday living space and larger social context in which the patient lived and returned to between sessions.

Betty Eisner's publications and personal correspondence are archived at Stanford University.
