= No Sex Please, We're British =

British play

- Original language: English
- Written by: Alistair Foot and Anthony Marriott
- Genre: Farce

Premiere
- Date: 3 June 1971
- Place: Strand Theatre; London
- Directed by: Allan Davis

No Sex Please, We're British is a British farce written by Alistair Foot and Anthony Marriott, which premiered in London's West End on 3 June 1971 at the Strand Theatre. It was panned by critics, but ran until 5 September 1987, transferring to the Garrick and the Duchess during the run of 6,761 performances.

== Plot ==
An assistant bank manager, Peter Hunter, lives in a flat above his bank with his new bride Frances. When Frances innocently sends off a mail order for some Scandinavian glassware, what comes back is Scandinavian pornography. The two, along with the bank's frantic chief cashier Brian Runnicles, must decide what to do with the veritable floods of pornography, photographs, books, films and eventually girls that threaten to engulf this happy couple. The matter is considerably complicated by the presence of Eleanor (Peter's mother), Mr. Bromhead (his boss), Mr. Needham (a visiting bank inspector) and Vernon Paul (a police superintendent).

== Stage play ==
The part of Brian Runnicles was first played on the London stage by Michael Crawford, who adopted a persona similar to that of his later character, Frank Spencer, in the television sitcom Some Mothers Do 'Ave 'Em. The Telegraph critic, John Barber, wrote of Crawford's performance: "He has an astonishing acrobatic agility and can dive through a door, or frog-leap through a serving hatch, with the alacrity of a frightened bat." David Jason and Andrew Sachs later took over the role of Runnicles. Other performers in the first cast included Anthony Valentine, Linda Thorson and Evelyn Laye. As of 2014, it was the longest-running comedy in British theatrical history.

It did not share the same commercial success in New York City. The Broadway production opened in February 1973 and closed after only 16 performances. In The New York Times, Clive Barnes wrote: "Its triviality is beyond contempt, its witlessness at times amusing, and the standard of the acting is not exactly memorable."

The play has also been produced in 50 countries.

== Film version ==
A film version starring Ronnie Corbett as Runnicles was released in 1973. There were many alterations to the script, including significant changes in dialogue, plot elements and to names: "Eleanor" was changed to "Bertha", "Mr. Bromhead" was changed to "Mr. Bromley" and "Peter" and "Frances" became "David" and "Penny", respectively. Michael Crawford turned down the film version.

== See also ==
- Don't Just Lie There, Say Something!

== Text ==
- No Sex Please, We're British, Samuel French, Inc., ISBN 0-573-61309-5

== Sources ==
- Nightingale, Benedict, "Fifth row center: a critic's year on and off Broadway", Deutsch, 1987, ISBN 0-233-98108-X, pp. 73–3
- Thornton, Michael, "Jessie Matthews: a biography", Mayflower, 1975, ISBN 0-583-12671-5
