= The Elgin Hour =

American anthology TV series (1954–1955)

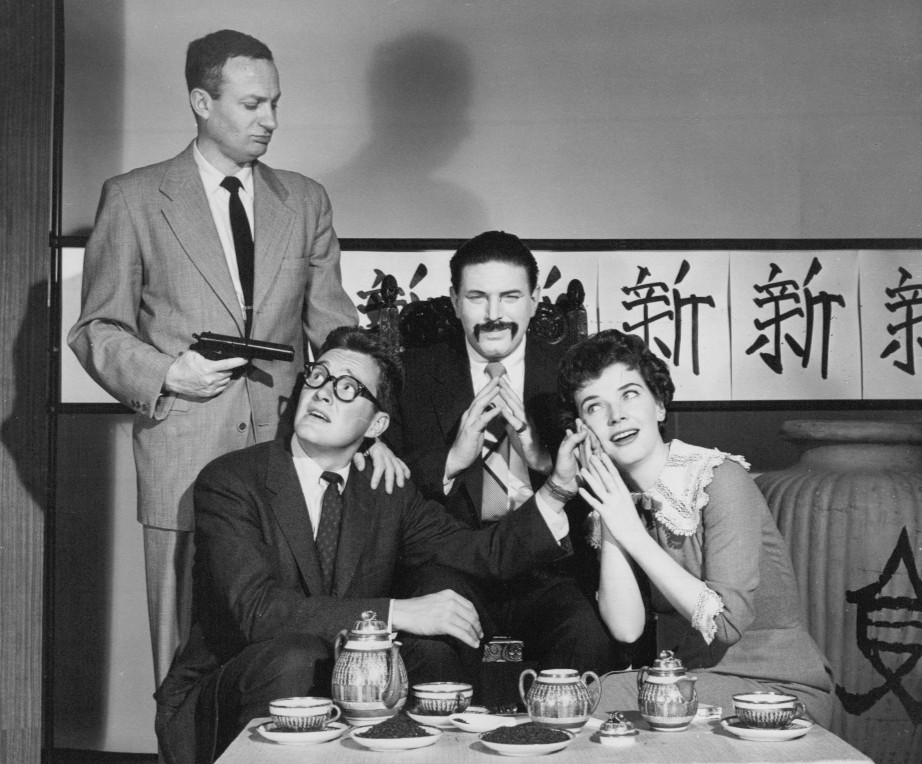
Joe Mantell holds a gun on Orson Bean, Theodore Bikel and Polly Bergen in "San Francisco Fracas", 1955

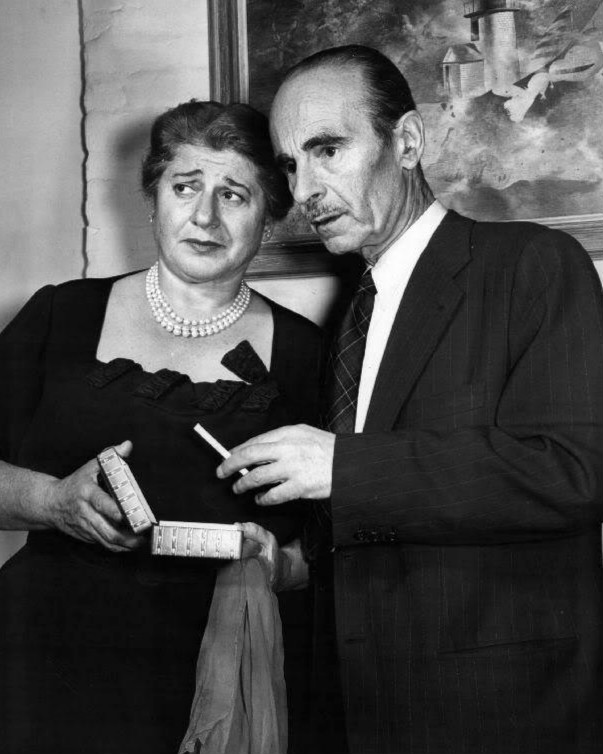
Gertrude Berg and Mikhail Rasumny in the episode "Hearts and Hollywood" (1954).

The Elgin Hour (also known as The Elgin TV Hour) is a 60-minute live American anthology drama that aired from October 5, 1954, to June 14, 1955, on ABC, alternating with The United States Steel Hour.

A total of 19 episodes featured actors John Cassavetes, Boris Karloff, Roddy McDowall, Kim Stanley, Teresa Wright, Joanne Woodward, and Robert Preston, among dozens of others. Its directors included the later notable feature directors, Daniel Petrie and Sidney Lumet. One of its writers was Reginald Rose, famous for writing the film 12 Angry Men. It was produced by Herbert Brodkin, a pioneering producer of early drama series that touched on social issues.

The program was sponsored by Elgin National Watch Company.

== Episodes ==
- "Floodtide" – October 5, 1954
- "Family Crisis" – October 19, 1954
- "High Man" – November 2, 1954
- "Warm Clay" – November 16, 1954
- "Hearts and Hollywood" – November 30, 1954
- "Yesterday's Magic" – December 14, 1954
- "Falling Star" – December 28, 1954
- "The Bridge" – January 11, 1955
- "Family Meeting" – January 25, 1955
- "Days of Grace" – February 8, 1955
- "Sting of Death" – February 22, 1955
- "Crime in the Streets" – March 8, 1955
- "The $1,000 Window" – March 22, 1955
- "Black Eagle Pass" – April 5, 1955
- "Midsummer Melody" – April 19, 1955
- "Driftwood" – May 3, 1955
- "San Francisco Fracas" – May 17, 1955
- "Mind Over Momma" – May 31, 1955
- "Combat Medics" – June 14, 1955
