= Gerald Heard =

British-born American historian, science writer, lecturer, educator and philosopher

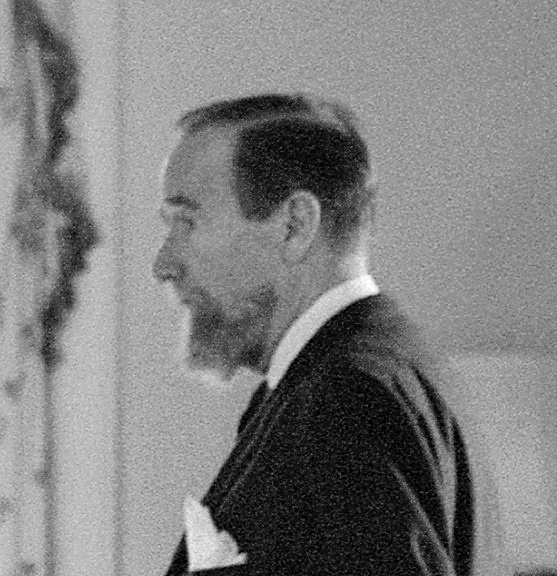
- Born: Henry FitzGerald Heard; 6 October 1889; London, England
- Died: 14 August 1971 (aged 81); Santa Monica, California
- Other name: Henry FitzGerald Heard
- Occupations: Science writer; historian; philosopher; novelist
- Partner: Christopher Wood

Education
- Education: University of Cambridge

Philosophical work
- Notable works: The Ascent of Humanity; A Taste for Honey; Training For a Life of Growth; The Five Ages of Man
- Website: geraldheard.com

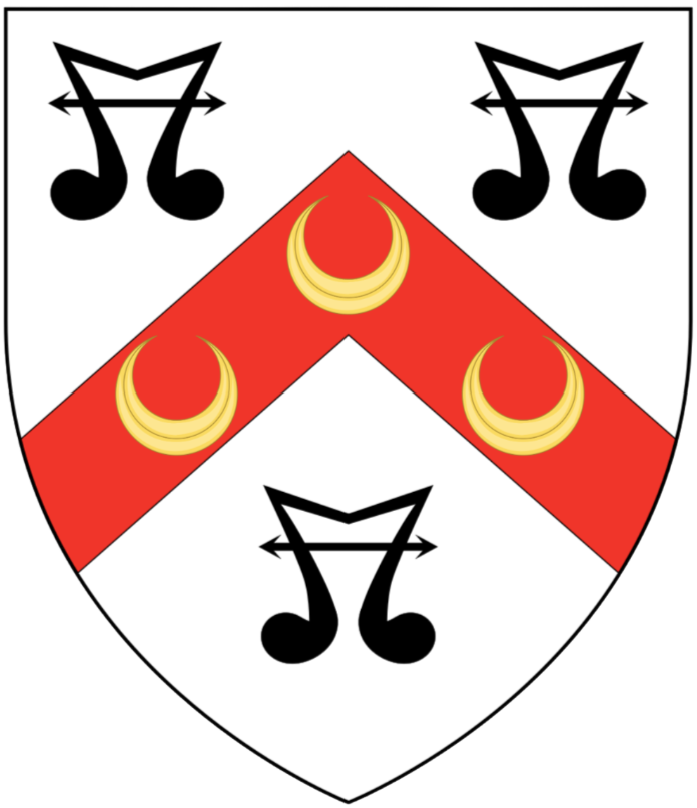
Arms of Heard of Kinsale Escutcheon: Argent, on a chevron gules between three water bougets sable as many crescents or. Crest: A demi-antelope ppr., ducally gorged or, charged on the shoulder with a water bouget as in the arms. Motto: Audior ("I Heard") or Toujours fidèle ("Always faithful")

Henry FitzGerald Heard (6 October 1889 – 14 August 1971), known commonly as Gerald Heard, was an English-born American historian, science writer and broadcaster, public lecturer, educator, and philosopher. He wrote many articles and more than 35 books.

Heard was a guide and mentor to numerous well-known people from the 1940s through the 1960s, including Aldous Huxley, Henry Luce, Clare Boothe Luce, and Bill Wilson, co-founder of Alcoholics Anonymous. His work was a forerunner of, and influence on, the consciousness development philosophy that has spread in the Western world since the 1960s.

== Early life ==
The son of an Anglo-Irish clergyman, Heard was born in London, but spent much of his youth in Ireland. His temperamental father practised corporal punishment, but his stepmother (his father's second wife) was kind to him.

Due to his inquisitive mind and interest in science, by age eight Heard began to become a skeptic regarding the conventional Christianity of his forebears — a process that was completed by the time he was age sixteen. He was educated at Sherborne School, Dorset, leaving in 1909. Heard studied history and theology at Gonville and Caius College, Cambridge, graduating with honours in history.

Heard became the literary secretary to William Snowdon Robson. After performing other roles, he lectured from 1926 to 1929 for Oxford University's extramural studies programme. Heard was interested strongly in developments in the sciences and, in 1929, edited The Realist, a short-lived monthly journal of scientific humanism whose sponsors included H. G. Wells, Arnold Bennett, Julian Huxley, and Aldous Huxley. In 1927 Heard began lecturing for the South Place Ethical Society. During the 1930s he became the first science commentator for the BBC. As well, he worked for the Agricultural Cooperative Movement in Ireland. During the 1920s and early 1930s, he acted as the personal secretary of Sir Horace Plunkett, promoter of cooperativism, who spent his last years at Weybridge, Surrey. Naomi Mitchison, who admired Plunkett and was a friend of Heard, wrote of that time: "H.P., as we all called him, was getting past his prime and often ill but struggling to go on with the work to which he was devoted. Gerald [Heard] who was shepherding him about fairly continually, apologized once for leaving a dinner party abruptly when H.P. was suddenly overwhelmed by exhaustion".

Horace Plunkett owned real estate in the U.S. states of Nebraska and Wyoming, and left some properties to Heard in his will. This inheritance proved invaluable when it enabled financing projects Heard pursued after his eventual emigration to the United States.

During the mid-1920s, Heard began a romantic relationship with socialite Christopher Wood, the young heir to a large grocery fortune, with whom he lived in London; by about 1935, however, Heard had declared himself celibate, though he continued to cohabit with Wood periodically until the 1950s.

== Career ==
In 1924, Heard published his first book, Narcissus: An Anatomy of Clothes. However, it was his book The Ascent of Humanity, published in 1929, that received the British Academy’s Hertz Prize and brought him widespread attention. From 1930 to 1934, he served as a science and current-affairs commentator for the BBC. From 1932 to 1942, Heard was a council member of the Society for Psychical Research.

In 1931 Heard had initiated an informal group to research group-mindedness or group communications, which became known as The Engineers Study Group because several of its members were engineers who afterwards were involved with the early development of computers. Naomi Mitchison also participated actively with the group.

After 1936, Heard ended his relationship with Mitchison due to her outspoken endorsement of the Republicans in the Spanish Civil War and her attempt, together with other members of the group, to bring weapons to Republican Spain. In his last letter to Mitchison, Heard expressed his sympathy for the victims of the war in Spain but compared the taking of sides in a war to "The relatives of a patient suffering from a deadly disease believing that he is curable by a hedge doctor (...) I am convinced that the way civilization is going is fatal, and the usual remedies only inflame the disease".

Meanwhile, Heard played a minor part in the development of the Peace Pledge Union. Heard became well known as an advocate for pacifism and argued for the transformation of behaviour by meditation and "disciplined nonviolence". In 1937 he emigrated to the United States to give some lectures at Duke University. Heard was accompanied by Aldous Huxley; Huxley's wife, Maria; and their son Matthew Huxley. In the United States, Heard's main activities were writing, lecturing, and the occasional radio or television appearance. He had developed an identity as an informed individual who recognised no intrinsic conflict among history, science, literature, and theology.

Though he lectured at Duke, Heard refused the offer of a job there and travelled west to settle in California. There he worked with the Society of Friends and the Pacific Coast Institute of International Affairs.

Heard was the first among a group of literati friends (several others of whom, including Christopher Isherwood, were also British) to discover Swami Prabhavananda and Vedanta. Heard became an initiate of Vedanta. Like that of his friend Aldous Huxley (another in the circle), the essence of Heard's mature philosophy was that a human being can effectively pursue intentional evolution of consciousness. He maintained a regular discipline of meditation, along the lines of yoga, for many years. He became interested in parapsychology and was a member of the Society for Psychical Research.

Heard concluded that the impediment to be addressed was "the problem of letting in a free flow of comprehension beyond the everyday threshold of experience while keeping the mind clear." In 1942, he founded Trabuco College as a facility where comparative religion studies and practices could be pursued. Living as a freelance scholar, Heard had enjoyed security in America by way of what he had inherited from Horace Plunkett as well as his own family. He used some of his inherited resources toward this most ambitious of projects. The idealistic experiment required land, and Heard bought 300 acres in Trabuco Canyon, in the Santa Ana Mountains.

Heard acted as chief advisor, but by nature he was neither an organizer nor a manager. Felix Greene, a nephew of Christopher Isherwood, had performed those roles. Professionally, Greene ultimately pursued a career in journalism and movie-making, but at the founding of Trabuco, he had exercised some talent in the planning of architecture and land-development. Soon after Greene quit the community and got married, practical life at Trabuco College began to decay. Heard deeded the land and facilities to the Vedanta Society of Southern California, which still maintains the facility as a Ramakrishna monastery and retreat.

During the mid-1950s, Heard was featured as series lecturer for the Sequoia Seminars (a precursor to the Esalen Institute), organized by Harold Rathbun, PhD, and Emilia Rathbun.

== Psychedelics ==
In 1954 Heard tried mescaline and, in 1955 tried LSD. He felt that, used properly, these had strong potential to "enlarge Man's mind" by allowing a person to see beyond his ego.

In August 1956, Alcoholics Anonymous founder Bill Wilson first took LSD—- under Heard's guidance and with the officiating presence of Sidney Cohen, a psychiatrist then with the California Veterans Administration Hospital. According to Wilson, the session allowed him to re-experience a spontaneous spiritual experience he had had years before, which had enabled him to overcome his own alcoholism. During the late 1950s, Heard also worked with psychiatrist Cohen to introduce others to LSD, including John Huston and Steve Allen. With experience, Heard developed a judicious opinion of the value of psychedelics, since at their best the insights and ecstasies they facilitate are temporary states. Religion writer Don Lattin wrote that Heard's view was "LSD might provide an experience of the great mysteries, but it offered no instant answers."

Heard was also responsible for introducing the then unknown Huston Smith to Aldous Huxley. Smith became one of the pre-eminent religious studies scholars in the United States. His book The World's Religions is a classic of the topic, has sold more than two million copies, and is considered a particularly useful introduction to comparative religion. The meeting with Huxley resulted eventually in Smith's brief association with Timothy Leary.

== Five Ages of Man ==
In January 1964, what some consider to be Heard's magnum opus, a book titled The Five Ages of Man, was published. (A new edition, retitled The Five Ages of Humanity, has been published.) According to Heard, the prevalent developmental stage among humans in modern, well-industrialized societies (especially in the West) should be regarded as the fourth: the "humanic stage" of the "total individual," who is dominated mentally, feeling him- or herself to be autonomous, separate from other persons. Heard writes (p. 226) this stage is characterised by "the basic humanic concept of a mankind that is completely self-seeking because it is completely individualized into separate physiques that can have direct knowledge of only their own private pain and pleasure, inferring but faintly the feelings of others. Such a race of ingenious animals, each able to see and to seek his own advantage, must be kept in combination with each other by appealing to their separate interests."

In modern industrial societies, a person, especially if educated, has the opportunity to begin entering the "first maturity" of the humanic "total individual" in his or her mid teens. However, according to Heard, a fifth stage is in the process of emerging, a post-individual psychological phase of persons and therefore of culture. According to Heard, the second maturity can be one that is beyond "personal success, economic mastery, and the psychophysical capacity to enjoy life" 240

Heard termed this phase "Leptoid Man" (from the Greek word lepsis: "to leap") because humans increasingly have the opportunity to "take a leap" into a considerably expanded consciousness, in which the various aspects of the psyche will be integrated, without any aspects being repressed or seeming foreign. A society that recognises this stage of development will honour and support individuals in a "second maturity" who wish to resolve their inner conflicts and dissolve their inner blockages and become the sages of the modern world. As Heard put it metaphorically, "you notice there aren't these separations... we're parts of a single continent, it meets underneath the water.” Further, instead of simply enjoying biological and psychological health, as Freud and other important psychiatric or psychological philosophers of the "total-individual" phase conceived, Leptoid man will not only have entered a meaningful "second maturity" recognised by his or her society, but can then become a human of developed spirituality, similar to the mystics of the past; and a person of wisdom.

But collectively and culturally we are still in the transitional phase, not really recognising an identity beyond the super-individualistic fourth, "humanic" phase. Heard's views were cautionary about developments in society that were not balanced, about inappropriate aims of our use of technological power. He wrote: "we are aware of our precarious imbalance: of our persistent and ever-increasing production of power and our inadequacy of purpose; of our critical analytic ability and our creative paucity; of our triumphantly efficient technical education and our ineffective, irrelevant education for values, for meaning, for the training of the will, the lifting of the heart, and the illumination of the mind."91

In May 2023, a revised and re-titled edition of Heard's The Five Ages of Man was released as The Five Ages of Humanity.

== Death ==
Toward the end of his life, Heard was given a bit of financial assistance by Henry Luce and Clare Boothe Luce. Heard died on 14 August 1971 at his home in Santa Monica, California, of the effects of several earlier strokes he had, beginning in 1966. At his request, there was not any memorial service, and his body was donated to the Willed Body Program at UCLA Medical Center.

== Legacy ==
Heard's general philosophy and the ideas and opinions of his later years, were influences on Myron Stolaroff, the electrical engineer who in 1961 founded the Institute for Advanced study, in Menlo Park, California. Trabuco College and Heard's philosophy and ideas were also an important influence on the founding of the Esalen Institute. Michael Murphy and Dick Price started organizing seminars at Esalen near Big Sur in 1962, with Heard being a notable presenter. Murphy and Price went on to officially establish the Esalen Institute in 1964. In turn, the institute has been a source of inspiration, and a prototype, for many other retreats and growth centers extending the human potential movement.

In popular culture: James Lapine's Broadway musical Flying Over Sunset includes a character named "Gerald Heard," modeled on the real-life Gerald Heard. The Heard character was played by Robert Sella in the first Broadway run (beginning in December 2021, though closing early during the mid-COVID period). Three other characters—Cary Grant, Aldous Huxley and Claire Boothe Luce—are modeled on those widely known public figures, each of whom, in real life, actually had repeated LSD experience. In the play (set during the 1950s), each of these three characters deals with a nagging emotional challenge, and Lapine delivers the play's essence in Act II, when the three have a shared LSD session with Heard serving as their guide.

== Fiction ==
Heard wrote fiction using the name H.F. Heard. This included three detective novels about Mr. Mycroft (implied to be Sherlock Holmes after his retirement). Mr. Mycroft and his friend, Mr. Silchester, featured in three novels: A Taste for Honey, 1941 (televised in 1955 as Sting of Death and filmed, as The Deadly Bees, 1967); Reply Paid; and The Notched Hairpin. The Great Fog and Other Weird Tales and The Lost Cavern and Other Tales of the Fantastic are collections of stories that include both science fiction and ghost stories. Hugh Lamb has described The Great Fog and The Lost Cavern as "two splendid books of short stories". The Black Fox is an occult thriller featuring black magic. Doppelgangers is a dystopian novel, influenced by Huxley's Brave New World, set after the "Psychological Revolution." Anthony Boucher described Doppelgangers as "in style and imagination, the most exciting and provocative piece of science fiction since the heyday of M. P. Shiel."

== Bibliography ==
Non-fiction

- 1924 Narcissus: An Anatomy of Clothes
- 1929 The Ascent of Humanity
- 1931 The Emergence of Man
- 1931 Social Substance of Religion: An Essay of the Evolution of Religion
- 1932 This Surprising World: A Journalist Looks at Science
- 1934 These Hurrying Years: An Historical Outline 1900–1933
- 1935 Science in the Making
- 1935 The Source of Civilization
- 1936 The Significance of the New Pacifism (Published in The New Pacifism)
- 1936 Exploring the Stratosphere
- 1937 The Third Morality
- 1937 Science Front, 1936
- 1939 Pain, Sex and Time: A New Outlook on Evolution and the Future of Man
- 1940 The Creed of Christ: An Interpretation of the Lord's Prayer
- 1941-1942 Training for the Life of the Spirit
- 1941 The Code of Christ: An Interpretation of the Beatitudes
- 1941 Man The Master
- 1942 A Dialogue in the Desert
- 1944 The Recollection
- 1944 A Preface to Prayer
- 1945 The Gospel According to Gamaliel
- 1946 The Eternal Gospel
- 1948 Is God Evident?: An Essay Toward a Natural Theology
- 1949 Prayers and Meditations: A Monthly Cycle Arranged for Daily Use (edited by Gerald Heard)
- 1950 Is God in History?: An Inquiry into Human and Prehuman History in Terms of the Doctrine of Creation, Fall, and Redemption
- 1950 Morals Since 1900
- 1950 Is Another World Watching?: The Riddle of the Flying Saucers
- 1952 Gabriel and the Creatures (UK edition entitled Wishing Well)
- 1955 The Human Venture
- 1959 Training For a Life of Growth
- 1964 The Five Ages of Man: The Psychology of Human History; rvsd. ed, 2023, as The Five Ages of Humanity

Fiction (published under H.F. Heard)

- 1941 A Taste for Honey
- 1942 Murder by Reflection
- 1942 Reply Paid: A Mystery
- 1944 The Great Fog and Other Weird Tales
- 1947 Doppelgangers: An Episode of the Fourth, The Psychological, Revolution
- 1947 "The President of the United States, Detective"
- 1948 The Lost Cavern and Other Tales of the Fantastic
- 1949 The Notched Hairpin: A Mycroft Mystery
- 1950 The Black Fox: A Novel of the Seventies

== See also ==
- Explorations Volume 2: Survival, Growth & Re-birth
- Sri Aurobindo
- Richard Bucke
- Lancelot Law Whyte
- Buckminster Fuller
- Aldous Huxley
- Lucille Kahn
- Walter Russell
- Arthur M. Young
- Noosphere
