= The Isle of Lost Ships (1923 film) =

1923 film by Maurice Tourneur

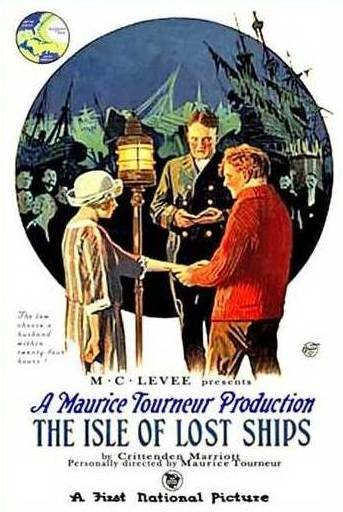
- 1923 theatrical poster
- Directed by: Maurice Tourneur
- Written by: Charles Maigne (scenario)
- Based on: The Isle of Dead Ships by Crittenden Marriott
- Produced by: Maurice Tourneur Productions& Ned Marin
- Starring: Anna Q. Nilsson
- Cinematography: Arthur L. Todd
- Edited by: Frank Lawrence
- Distributed by: Associated First National
- Release date: March 18, 1923
- Running time: 8 reels (7,425 ft)
- Country: United States
- Language: Silent (English intertitles)

(For the 1929 talkie see The Isle of Lost Ships (1929 film))

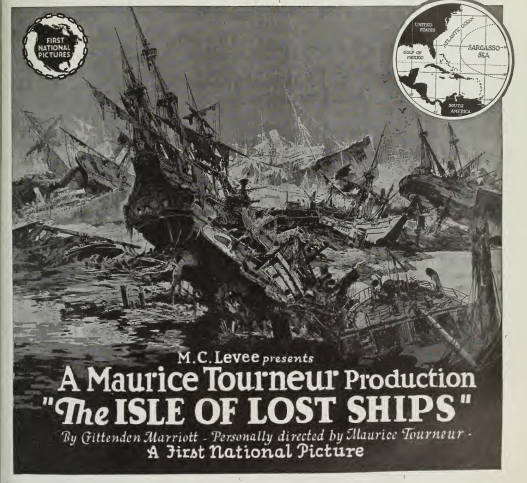
lobby card.

The Isle of Lost Ships is a 1923 American silent adventure/melodrama film produced and directed by Maurice Tourneur. It was distributed by Associated First National Pictures. The film is based on the novel The Isle of Dead Ships written by Crittenden Marriott around 1909. In 1929, director Irvin Willat, re-filmed the story.

Maurice Tourneur himself also created a different film with a similar theme called The Ship of Lost Souls in 1929, featuring the young German actress, Marlene Dietrich in the cast.

The 1923 version of the film is believed to be lost, and no longer available.

== Cast ==
- Anna Q. Nilsson as Dorothy Fairfax
- Milton Sills as Frank Howard
- Frank Campeau as Detective Jackson
- Walter Long as Peter Forbes
- Bert Woodruff as Patrick Joyce
- Aggie Herring as Mother Joyce
- Herschel Mayall as Captain Clark

== Story ==
The story revolves around people and ships trapped in a section of the southern Atlantic Ocean infested with seaweed, known as the Sargasso Sea.

== See also ==
- List of lost films
- The Lost Continent (1968). Also set in the Sargasso Sea.
