= The Isle of Lost Ships (1929 film) =

1929 film

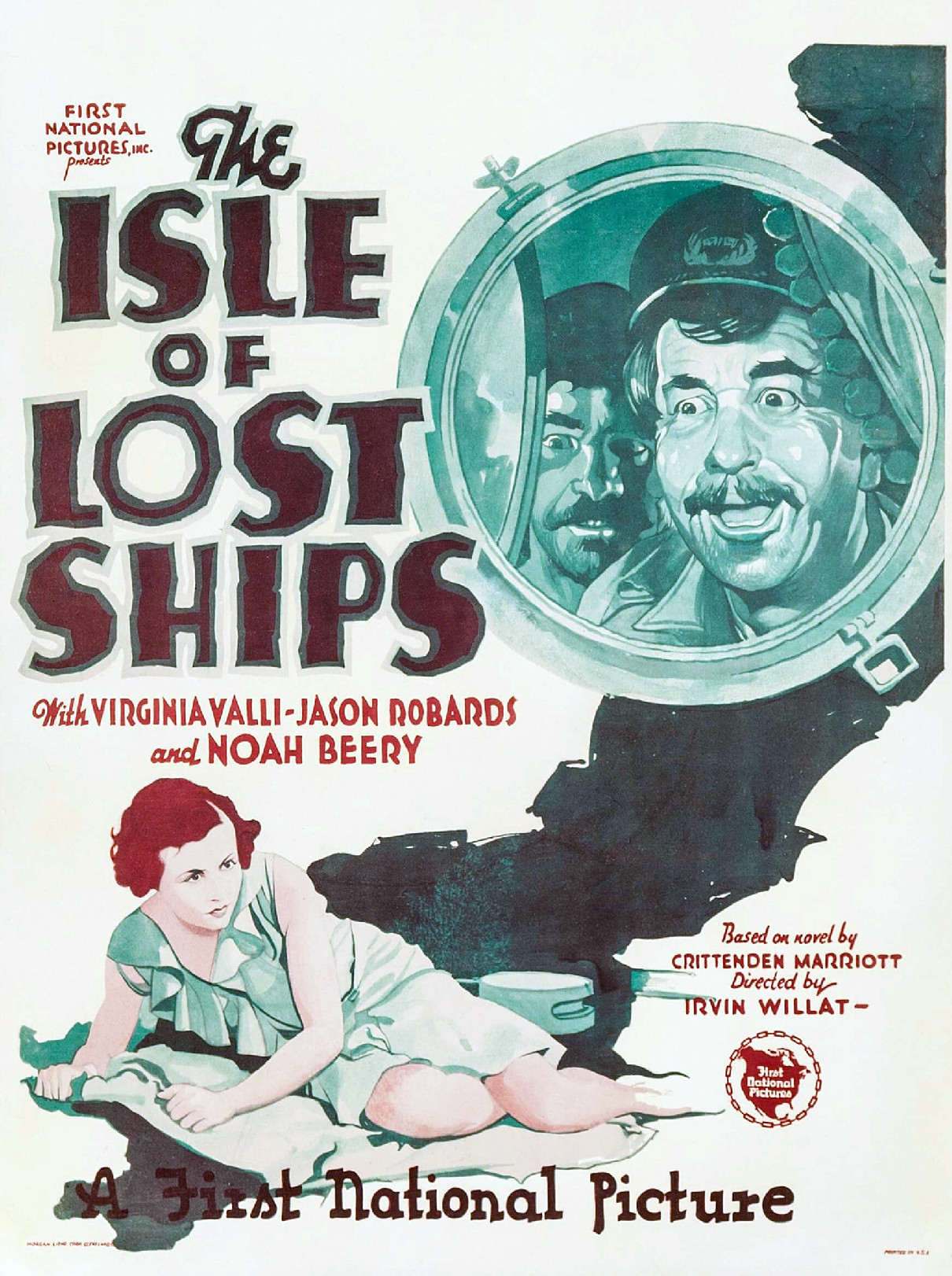
- Poster
- Directed by: Irvin Willat
- Written by: Fred Myton (scenario, dialogue, titles); Paul Perez (dialogue, titles)
- Based on: The Isle of Dead Ships by Crittenden Marriott
- Produced by: Richard A. Rowland
- Starring: Jason Robards Sr. Virginia Valli; Noah Beery Sr.
- Cinematography: Sol Polito
- Edited by: John Rawlins
- Music by: Cecil Copping; Alois Reiser
- Production company: First National Pictures
- Distributed by: Warner Bros. Pictures
- Release date: November 29, 1929
- Running time: 9 reels; 7,576
- Country: United States
- Languages: Sound (All-Talking); English

The Isle of Lost Ships is a 1929 American all-talking sound drama film. The picture was produced by Richard A. Rowland and distributed by Warner Bros. Pictures. Irvin Willat was the director with Jason Robards Sr., Virginia Valli, and Noah Beery Sr. in the leads. It is based on the 1909 novel The Isle of Dead Ships by Crittenden Marriott, and is also a remake of Maurice Tourneur's now lost 1923 classic of the same name. A mute copy of this film is preserved at the Library of Congress and UCLA. The Vitaphone discs which contain the soundtrack to the film are currently lost. An almost complete copy of the Dutch silent version of the film survives (reel four is missing) at the Eye Filmmuseum archive with an estimated running time of 55:58.

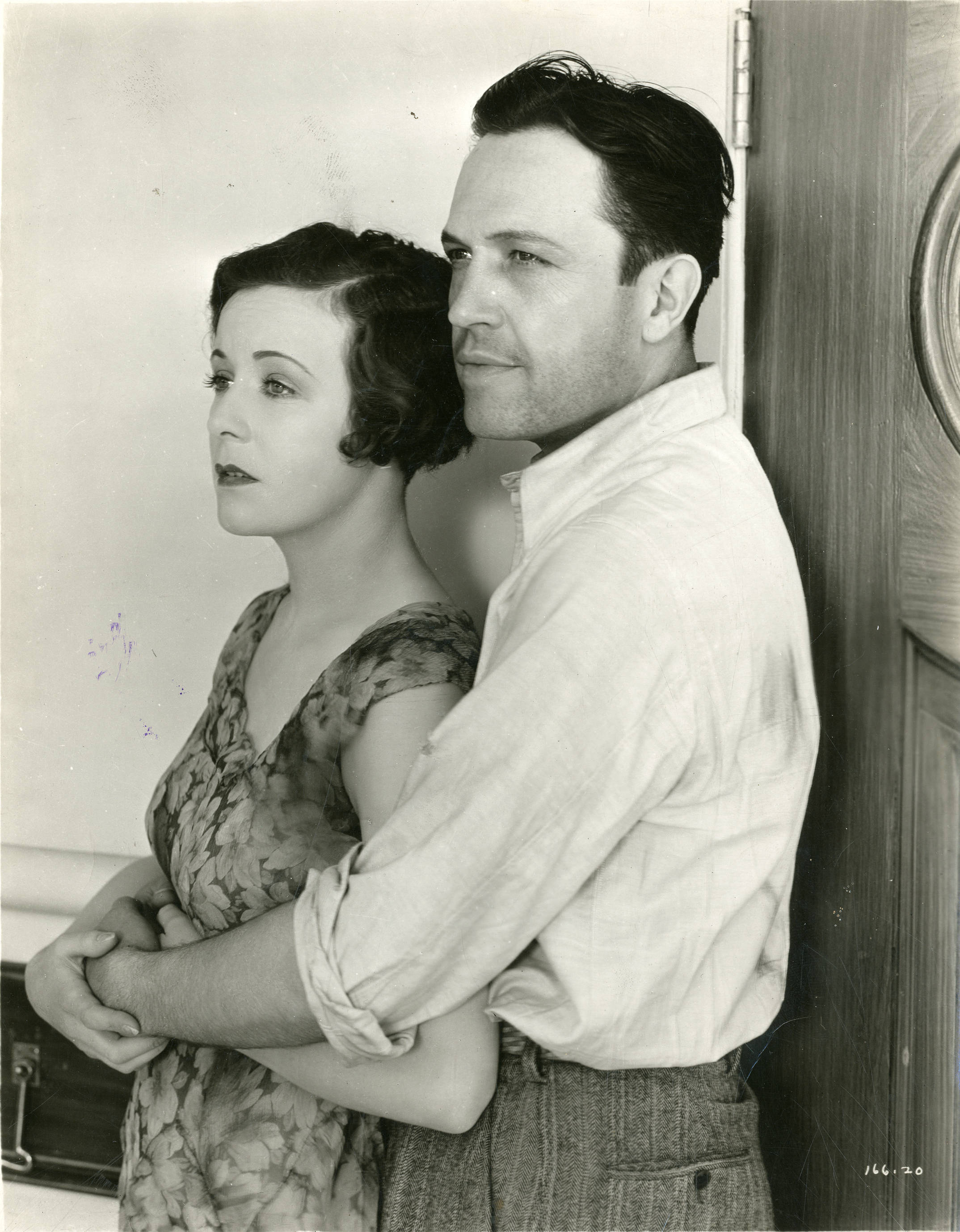
Scene from The Isle of Lost Ships (1929 film)

== Plot ==
Aboard the ocean liner S.S. Queen, sailing from Puerto Rico to New York, Lieutenant Frank Howard travels in custody, handcuffed and accused of the murder of his wife. He is escorted by Detective R.L. Jackson, a determined officer of the law. During the voyage, Howard meets Dorothy Whitlock, a wealthy young society woman traveling with her aunt, Mrs. Renwick. Dorothy is instantly drawn to the quiet, stoic Howard, though the accusation against him troubles her deeply.

As the Queen approaches the treacherous Sargasso Sea, known for its thick seaweed masses and drifting shipwrecks, disaster strikes. The liner collides with a derelict vessel and begins to take on water. Chaos erupts as passengers abandon ship. In the frenzy, Jackson forgets his handcuffed prisoner, still below deck. Realizing his mistake, he races back to rescue Howard.

They return topside only to find the lifeboats gone, too far out to reach. The last lifeboat to have left, however, capsizes and when Howard and Jackson look for any survivors they see a woman floating in the ocean. Howard quickly jumps into the ocean to rescue her. As he brings her back to the ship they discover the woman is Dorothy. The Queen, despite her damage, remains afloat, and the trio begins to drift—eventually carried deep into the heart of the Sargasso Sea. After days adrift, they become stranded amid a surreal floating graveyard of wrecked ships from various centuries—an isolated, decaying “island” of lost vessels and seaweed.

To their astonishment, they discover a colony of more than fifty shipwreck survivors, all men save for two women. The strange society is ruled by Captain Peter Forbes, a grizzled ex-whaler who enforces a harsh law: any woman who arrives must marry at once to avoid disputes among the men. Forbes, having long been without female company, claims Dorothy for himself.

Dorothy, however, chooses Frank Howard. Under the colony's law, Forbes has the right to challenge her choice. A brutal hand-to-hand duel ensues between Howard and Forbes. Howard triumphs, earning the right to marry Dorothy. But the tension does not abate—Forbes and his followers vow revenge, and Detective Jackson, now more ally than jailer, joins Howard and Dorothy in preparing for a possible attack.

Their sanctuary becomes the partially sunken S.S. Queen, which they fortify for a final standoff. However, Mr. Burke, a friendly Irish mechanic who powers the colony's electric lights using a stranded submarine, reveals a better way out: the submarine is fully functional. Burke secretly leads them to it, and Howard prepares for escape.

As they board the vessel, Forbes and his men arrive with rifles, firing at them and even managing to lasso the sub. A tense moment follows, but the submarine breaks free and dives beneath the seaweed, escaping the floating nightmare of the Sargasso Sea.

Now safe and at last beyond the reach of the lost ships, Jackson agrees to help Howard clear his name back in Puerto Rico. Dorothy, relieved and in love, tells Frank that their sham marriage aboard the derelict was not a formality—it is going to be a real one.

== Cast ==
- Jason Robards Sr. as Frank Howard
- Virginia Valli as Dorothy Whitlock/Renwick
- Noah Beery Sr. as Captain Peter Forbes
- Clarissa Selwynne as Aunt Emma/Mrs. Renwick
- Robert Emmett O'Connor as Jackson
- Harry Cording as Gallagher
- Margaret Fielding as Mrs. Gallagher
- Kathrin Clare Ward as Mother Joyce/Burke
- Robert Homans as Mr. Burke
- Jack Ackroyd as Harry
- Sam Baker as himself

== Music ==
The film featured a theme song entitled "Ship Of My Dreams" which was composed by George W. Meyer and Al Bryan. This song is performed by an unidentified tenor during the wedding scene in the film. The song was recorded by the popular singer Bob Fisher for Parlophone Records (Catalog Number R 537).

== Critical reception ==
A contemporary review in Variety reported that "the originality of the story [...] shares honors with the weird effect established by sets and the camera angles at which they are focused," that "the sets and atmosphere [...] keep an audience ever interested and tense," and described the scene in which the character Howard is "shot through a torpedo tube" as sufficiently quick and active that it "helps lessen the impossible." A contemporary review of the film in The New York Times reported that "the weird story is the strongest point and the acting negligible," that "[t]his queer tale, while not particularly helped by the addition of sound, appears as a relief from the musical films and those audible photoplays in which dialogue holds the centre of the screen," that the character Howard "not only knows all about ships, radios and women, but who also can man a submarine and teach a crew its operation in three minutes," and that "Virginia Valli does not do much more than scream a little now and then."

== See also ==
- List of early sound feature films (1926–1929)
- List of early Warner Bros. sound and talking features
- The Lost Continent, 1968 film also set in the Sargasso Sea.
