= 1975 in British television =

This is a list of British television related events from 1975.

== Events ==
=== January ===
- 2 January – The police drama series The Sweeney premieres on ITV, with John Thaw and Dennis Waterman.
- January – Due to financial cutbacks at the BBC, BBC1 scales back its weekday early afternoon programming. Consequently, apart from schools programmes, adult education and live sport, the channel now shows a trade test transmission between 2pm and the start of children's programmes and when not broadcasting actual programmes, BBC2 begins fully closing down on weekdays between 11:30am and 4pm.
- 7 January – First edition of the long running golf series International Pro-Celebrity Golf on BBC2, Hosted by commentators Henry Longhurst and Peter Allis, the show paired elite professional golfers with high-profile entertainment and sports celebrities. This series would run until 1989 and would normally feature 2 celebrities and 2 professionals playing at least nine holes, This year, it was a seven match tournament between Great Britain and USA.
- 20 January – Due to the decision to fully close down the network during the day, Service Information is now broadcast once a day, at 10.30am, rather than three times a day.
- 22 January – 26 February – Drama series The Love School, about the Pre-Raphaelite Brotherhood, is broadcast on BBC2.

=== February ===
- 15 February – ITV shows the 1969 comedy film Carry On Camping, starring Sid James, Kenneth Williams, Joan Sims, Charles Hawtrey, Terry Scott and Barbara Windsor.
- 25 February – BBC1 begins showing the American Western family drama Little House on the Prairie, starring Michael Landon.

=== March ===
- 14 March – After less than two years on the air, the Bristol Channel closes.
- 17 March – BBC1 begins showing the Hanna-Barbera cartoon series Hong Kong Phooey.
- 24 March – Wellingborough Cablevision closes.

=== April ===
- 1 April – Premiere of Edward the Seventh, a drama series made by ATV in 13 one-hour episodes and based on the biography of King Edward VII by Sir Philip Magnus.
- 3 April – Meg Richardson (Noele Gordon) marries Hugh Mortimer (John Bentley) on the ATV soap opera Crossroads.
- 4 April – The Richard Briers and Felicity Kendal-starring sitcom The Good Life makes its debut on BBC1.
- 13 April – Game show The Golden Shot (hosted by Bob Monkhouse) airs its final episode on ITV after an eight-year run.

=== May ===
- 31 May – Jim'll Fix It hosted by Jimmy Savile makes its debut on BBC1.

=== June ===
- 3 June – BBC2 shows Ken Loach's 1969 drama film Kes, starring David Bradley as fifteen year old Billy Casper who befriends a wild kestrel.
- 7–21 June – The BBC shows extensive live coverage of the first Cricket World Cup. The BBC also shows full coverage of the 1979 World Cup.
- 11 June – A pilot of the sitcom The Melting Pot, written by and starring Spike Milligan (in brownface) with Neil Shand, is broadcast on BBC2. The following year, a full series of six episodes is recorded but never broadcast.

=== July ===
- 5 July – BBC1 launches the long-running Summer variety show Seaside Special.
- 14 July – New Broadcasting House (Manchester) starts broadcasting programming for BBC North West. It becomes fully operational by September.
- 15 July – BBC1 transmits This is Ceefax in which Angela Rippon tells the story of this new form of broadcasting and looks at some of its uses.
- 20 July – ITV first airs the Bob Monkhouse-hosted game show Celebrity Squares.

=== August ===
- 2 August – BBC2 launches a season of Saturday evening horror movie double bills with Midnight Movie Fantastic. It will continue to be shown until 1983.
- 13 August – BBC1 begins showing the U.S. detective series The Rockford Files, starring James Garner.

=== September ===
- 2 September – Runaround, a children's game show hosted by Mike Reid, is first broadcast on ITV.
- 3 September – ITV begins showing the supernatural children's anthology series Shadows.
- 4 September – Gerry Anderson's live-action science fiction series Space: 1999 debuts on ITV, starring Martin Landau.
- 19 September – BFBS Television broadcasts for the first time, in Celle, near Hanover in the West Germany from Trenchard Barracks. The service consists of taped broadcasts from the BBC and ITV, flown to Germany from London which are then rebroadcast using low-power UHF transmitters.
- 19 September – John Cleese's hotel comedy series Fawlty Towers debuts on BBC2. with the episode "A Touch of Class".
- 20 September – ITV Southern shows the 1972 made for television horror film The Night Stalker, starring Darren McGavin, ahead of other ITV regions.
- 25 September – Yorkshire Television premieres Animal Kwackers, the British version of the United States television series The Banana Splits Adventure Hour, which ended almost six years earlier, but shorter and very different from the American version. It goes on to air for three series.

=== October ===
- 1 October – The arts documentary series Arena makes its debut on BBC2.
- 24 October – BBC2 broadcasts the Fawlty Towers episode "The Germans", in which a concussed Basil Fawlty starts goose-stepping and impersonating Adolf Hitler to his German guests.
- 28 October – ITV shows a James Bond film on British television for the first time: Terence Young's 1962 big screen debut of 007 in Dr. No, with Sean Connery starring as Ian Fleming's British secret agent.

=== December ===
- 9 December – 15th anniversary of the first episode of Coronation Street.
- 16 December – BBC1 shows the courtroom drama Rumpole of the Bailey, as part of the Play for Today series. The titular character, played by Leo McKern, proves so popular that the ITV would develop it into a full series in 1978.
- 17 December
  - The Thames Television film The Naked Civil Servant, based on Quentin Crisp's memoirs, is broadcast on British television. The film stars John Hurt in the title role.
  - The final episode of sitcom Till Death Us Do Part is broadcast on BBC1.
- 22 December – ITV screens the network premiere of David Lean's 1962 historical film Lawrence of Arabia, starring Peter O'Toole as T. E. Lawrence, Alec Guinness, Omar Sharif, Anthony Quayle and Claude Rains. The film is split into two parts and shown over consecutive nights.
- 23 December
  - The animated children's series Bod debuts on BBC1, with eleven more episodes to broadcast the following year.
  - BBC1 shows the television premiere of the 1968 comedy film Carry On Up the Khyber, starring Sid James, Kenneth Williams, Charles Hawtrey, Joan Sims, and Roy Castle.
- 24 December – BBC1 shows the 1974 animated film version of Oscar Wilde's children's story The Happy Prince, narrated by Christopher Plummer. The short film would be shown several times on the BBC until 1986.
- 25 December – As part of the Christmas Day highlights, BBC1 screens the British television premiere of the 1939 MGM fantasy musical The Wizard of Oz, starring Judy Garland. The film will go on to be shown regularly on the BBC during the Christmas period until the 1990s. Also receiving a television premiere on BBC1 is Butch Cassidy and the Sundance Kid starring Robert Redford and Paul Newman.
- 26 December – BBC1 Boxing Day network premiere of the 1970 family film The Railway Children, starring Jenny Agutter and Bernard Cribbins.
- 27 December – BBC1 shows the 1973 made for television horror drama Frankenstein: The True Story, starring Jane Seymour and James Mason.
- 31 December – BBC2 shows Tom Stoppard's adaptation of Jerome K. Jerome's critically acclaimed boating holiday comedy Three Men in a Boat, directed by Stephen Frears and starring Michael Palin, Tim Curry and Stephen Moore.

== Debuts ==
=== BBC1 ===
- 1 January – The Secret Garden (1975)
- 6 January
  - Philbert Frog (1975)
  - Public Account (1975–1978)
  - The Changes (1975)
- 7 January – The Venturers (1975)
- 12 January – The 607080 Show (1975–1980)
- 26 January – Anne of Avonlea (1975)
- 25 February – Little House on the Prairie (1974–1983)
- 5 March – You're on Your Own (1975)
- 9 March – The Master of Ballantrae (1975)
- 17 March – Hong Kong Phooey (1974)
- 4 April – The Good Life (1975–1978)
- 16 April – Survivors (1975–1977)
- 23 April – Wodehouse Playhouse (1975–1978)
- 24 April – Sam and the River (1975)
- 2 May – Private Affairs (1975)
- 31 May – Jim'll Fix It (1975–1994)
- 11 June – The Melting Pot (1975)
- 5 July – Seaside Special (1975–1979)
- 14 July – My Honourable Mrs (1975)
- 16 July – The Rough with the Smooth (1975)
- 27 July – Zot the Dog (1975)
- 9 August – Sportscene (1975–present)
- 13 August – The Rockford Files (1974–1980)
- 26 August – Oil Strike North (1975)
- 27 August – I Didn't Know You Cared (1975–1979)
- 29 August – Quiller (1975)
- 1 September – Angels (1975–1983)
- 2 September – The Growing Pains of P.C. Penrose (1975)
- 11 September – Days of Hope (1975)
- 24 September – The Hill of the Red Fox (1975)
- 26 September – The Invisible Man (1975)
- 5 October
  - Ballet Shoes (1975)
  - Poldark (1975–1977)
  - Little Monsters (1975–1978)
- 12 October – On the Move (1975–1976)
- 18 November – Emu's Broadcasting Company (1975–1980)
- 23 November – The Legend of Robin Hood (1975)
- 25 November – Francis Durbridge Presents: The Doll (1975)
- 4 December – State of Emergency (1975)
- 23 December – Bod (1975–1976)
- 31 December – Striker (1975)

=== BBC2 ===
- 2 January – After That, This (1975)
- 22 January – The Love School (1975)
- 19 March – The Fight Against Slavery (1975)
- 29 March – A Legacy (1975)
- 3 May – The Girls of Slender Means (1975)
- 12 May – Rutland Weekend Television (1975–1976)
- 24 May – Looking for Clancy (1975)
- 13 June – Ten from the Twenties (1975)
- 18 June – The Poisoning of Charles Bravo (1975)
- 2 August – Midnight Movie Fantastic (1975)
- 19 September – Fawlty Towers (1975, 1979)
- 22 September – Madame Bovary (1975)
- 25 September – Making Faces (1975)
- 26 September – The Wild West Show (1975)
- 1 October – Arena (1975–present)
- 29 October – The Philanthropist (1975)
- 21 November – Trinity Tales (1975)
- 26 November – Moll Flanders (1975)
- 1 December – North and South (1975)
- 21 December – The Punch Review (1975–1977)
- 29 December – How Green Was My Valley (1975–1976)
- 31 December – Three Men in a Boat (1975)

=== ITV ===
- 2 January – The Sweeney (1975–1978)
- 4 January – Carry on Laughing (1975)
- 6 January – The Life of Riley (1975)
- 10 January – Dog of Flanders (1975)
- 12 January – Joby (1975)
- 14 January – Nightingale's Boys (1975)
- 15 January – Cilla's Comedy Six (1975)
- 13 February – Flower Stories (1975)
- 15 February – The Hanged Man (1975)
- 19 March – The Wackers (1975)
- 24 March – Noddy (1975)
- 1 April – Edward the Seventh (1975)
- 7 April – Sky (1975)
- 20 April – Winner Takes All (1975–1988, 1997)
- 21 April – Sadie, It's Cold Outside (1975)
- 26 April – Tarbuck and All That! (1975)
- 27 April – Doctor on the Go (1975–1977)
- 7 May – The Loner (1975)
- 28 May – You Must Be Joking! (1975–1976)
- 8 June – The Siege of Golden Hill (1975)
- 12 June – Dawson's Weekly (1975)
- 3 July –
  - Three Comedies of Marriage (1975)
  - Gambit (1975–1985, 1995)
- 13 July – Against the Crowd (1975)
- 20 July – Celebrity Squares (1975–1979, 1993–1997, 2014–2015)
- 22 July – Johnny Go Home (1975)
- 23 July – Down the 'Gate (1975–1976)
- 2 August – The Summer Show (1975)
- 7 August – Comedy Premiere (1975)
- 2 September – Runaround (1975–1981, 1985–1986)
- 3 September – Shadows (1975–1978)
- 4 September
  - The Stars Look Down (1975)
  - Space: 1999 (1975–1978)
- 6 September – Two's Company (1975–1979)
- 7 September – My Brother's Keeper (1975–1976)
- 8 September
  - Hogg's Back (1975–1976)
  - My Son Reuben (1975)
- 9 September – Shades of Greene (1975–1976)
- 19 September – Larry Grayson (1975–1977)
- 25 September – Animal Kwackers (1975–1978)
- 8 October
  - It's a Lovely Day Tomorrow (1975)
  - Rule Britannia! (1975)
- 14 October – Couples (1975–1976)
- 15 October – Cooper (1975)
- 16 October – Get Some In! (1975–1978)
- 27 October – The Cuckoo Waltz (1975–1980)
- 17 December – The Naked Civil Servant (1975)
- Unknown – The Brady Bunch (1969–1974)

== Television shows ==
=== Changes of network affiliation ===
Shows	Moved from	Moved to
Ivor the Engine	ITV	BBC One; BBC Two

=== Returning this year after a break of one year or longer ===
- Ivor the Engine (1959, 1975–1977)

== Continuing television shows ==
=== 1920s ===
- BBC Wimbledon (1927–1939, 1946–2019, 2021–present)

=== 1930s ===
- Trooping the Colour (1937–1939, 1946–2019, 2023–present)
- The Boat Race (1938–1939, 1946–2019, 2021–present)
- BBC Cricket (1939, 1946–1999, 2020–2024)

=== 1950s ===
- Come Dancing (1950–1998)
- The Good Old Days (1953–1983)
- Panorama (1953–present)
- Dixon of Dock Green (1955–1976)
- Crackerjack (1955–1984, 2020–present)
- Opportunity Knocks (1956–1978, 1987–1990)
- This Week (1956–1978, 1986–1992)
- What the Papers Say (1956–2008)
- The Sky at Night (1957–present)
- Blue Peter (1958–present)
- Grandstand (1958–2007)

=== 1960s ===
- Coronation Street (1960–present)
- Songs of Praise (1961–present)
- Z-Cars (1962–1978)
- Animal Magic (1962–1983)
- Doctor Who (1963–1989, 1996, 2005–present)
- World in Action (1963–1998)
- Top of the Pops (1964–2006)
- Match of the Day (1964–present)
- Crossroads (1964–1988, 2001–2003)
- Play School (1964–1988)
- Mr. and Mrs. (1965–1999)
- Call My Bluff (1965–2005)
- World of Sport (1965–1985)
- Jackanory (1965–1996, 2006)
- Sportsnight (1965–1997)
- It's a Knockout (1966–1982, 1999–2001)
- The Money Programme (1966–2010)
- Playhouse (1967–1982)
- Reksio (1967–1990)
- Dad's Army (1968–1977)
- Magpie (1968–1980)
- The Big Match (1968–2002)
- Softly, Softly: Task Force (1969–1976)
- Nationwide (1969–1983)
- Screen Test (1969–1984)

=== 1970s ===
- The Goodies (1970–1982)
- Bless This House (1971–1976)
- The Onedin Line (1971–1980)
- The Old Grey Whistle Test (1971–1987)
- The Two Ronnies (1971–1987, 1991, 1996, 2005)
- Love Thy Neighbour (1972–1976)
- Thunderbirds (1972–1980, 1984–1987)
- Clapperboard (1972–1982)
- Crown Court (1972–1984)
- Pebble Mill at One (1972–1986, 1991–1996)
- Are You Being Served? (1972–1985)
- Rainbow (1972–1992, 1994–1997)
- Emmerdale (1972–present)
- Newsround (1972–present)
- Weekend World (1972–1988)
- Pipkins (1973–1981)
- We Are the Champions (1973–1987)
- Last of the Summer Wine (1973–2010)
- That's Life! (1973–1994)
- Porridge (1974–1977)
- The Wheeltappers and Shunters Social Club (1974–1977)
- Happy Ever After (1974–1978)
- Rising Damp (1974–1978)
- Within These Walls (1974–1978)
- It Ain't Half Hot Mum (1974–1981)
- Tiswas (1974–1982)
- Wish You Were Here...? (1974–2003)

== Ending this year ==
- 31 March – Up Pompeii! (1969–1975, 1991–1992)
- 7 April – Public Eye (1965–1975)
- 12 April – My Old Man (1974–1975)
- 13 April – The Golden Shot (1967–1975)
- 8 May – Flower Stories (1975)
- 31 May – Vicky the Viking (1974–1975)
- 17 June – Captain Pugwash (1957–1975, 1997–2002)
- 23 June – Churchill's People (1974–1975)
- 10 August – Top of the Form (1962–1975)
- 29 August – Not On Your Nellie (1974–1975)
- 6 December – Don't Drink the Water (1974–1975)
- 17 December – Till Death Us Do Part (1965–1975)
- 21 December – Upstairs, Downstairs (1971–1975, 2010–2012)
- 31 December – Dog of Flanders (1975)
- Unknown – Watch with Mother (1952–1975)

== Births ==
- 13 February – Katie Hopkins, reality show contestant and journalist
- 25 February – Naga Munchetty, presenter and journalist
- 3 March – Patricia Potter, actress
- 16 May – Charlotte Hawkins, journalist and newsreader
- 21 May – Ruth Wignall, journalist and broadcaster
- 27 May – Jamie Oliver, chef and television personality
- 29 May – Mel B, singer (Spice Girls), actress and television presenter
- 1 July – Trey Farley, television presenter
- 2 July – Melanie Clark Pullen, actress (died 2022)
- 15 July
  - Jill Halfpenny, actress
  - Ed Leigh, adventure sports presenter
- 17 July – Konnie Huq, television presenter
- 22 July – Hannah Waterman, actress
- 22 August – Sheree Murphy, actress
- 25 August – Sarah Manners, actress
- 25 September – Declan Donnelly, television presenter, one half of Ant and Dec
- 28 September – Kelly Cates, née Dalglish, Scottish sports presenter
- 26 October – Michael Underwood, television presenter
- 7 November – Francine Lewis, comedian, actress and model
- 18 November – Anthony McPartlin, television presenter, one half of Ant and Dec
- 11 December – Dawn Steele, actress
- Unknown – Laura Jones, Welsh television journalist

== Deaths ==
- 26 February – Denis Goodwin, 45, comedy scriptwriter (Fast and Loose, Bright's Boffins), suicide.
- 23 April – William Hartnell, 67, actor (Doctor Who).
- 18 October – Graham Haberfield, 33, actor (Coronation Street).

== See also ==
- 1975 in British music
- 1975 in British radio
- 1975 in the United Kingdom
- List of British films of 1975
