= Guy Henry (actor) =

English actor

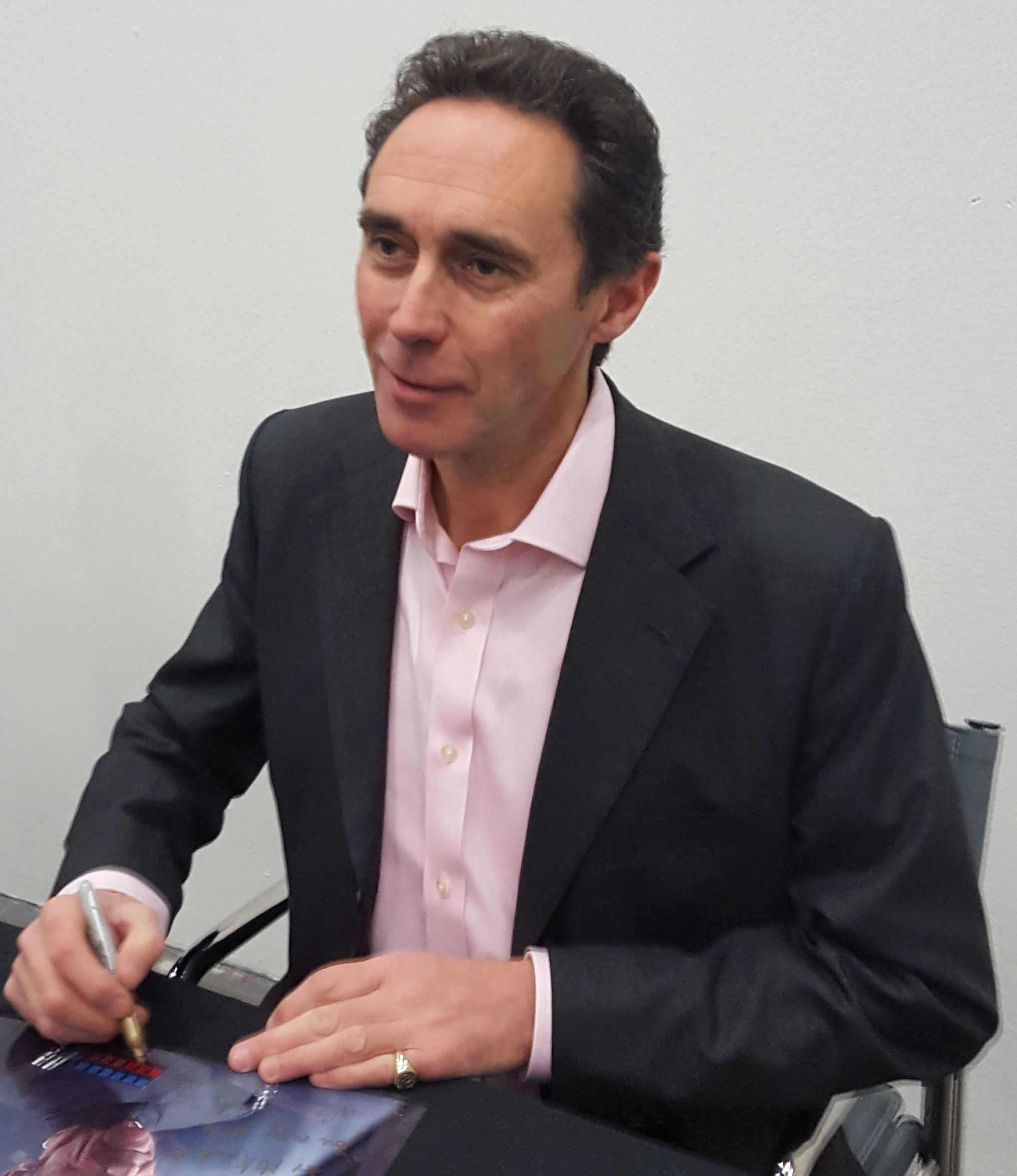
- Henry at Stockholm International Fairs in 2018
- Born: 17 October 1960 (age 65); London, England
- Occupation: Actor
- Years active: 1982–present

Guy Henry (born 17 October 1960) is an English actor whose roles include Henrik Hanssen in Holby City, Pius Thicknesse in Harry Potter and the Deathly Hallows – Part 1 and Part 2, Cassius in Rome and Grand Moff Tarkin in Rogue One.

== Early life and career ==
Henry was born on 17 October 1960 in London. He attended Homefield School and then Brockenhurst College in Hampshire where he took A levels. He trained at RADA (1979–81). In 1982, he took the title role in ITV's Young Sherlock Holmes series, playing Holmes as a teenager (though Henry was by then nearly 22).

In February 2015, Henry was announced as a public supporter of Chapel Lane Theatre Company based in Stratford-Upon-Avon.

== Stage work ==
=== Highcliffe Charity Players ===
Henry first appeared on stage as a footman in amateur dramatic society Highcliffe Charity Players' production of Cinderella at age 11. He is now the president of HCP and continues to support their productions.

=== RSC work ===
Henry's main work has been with the Royal Shakespeare Company, including the following roles:

- 1991 – Thurio (The Two Gentlemen of Verona), Poggio (Tis Pity She's a Whore), Ananias (The Alchemist).
- 1992 – Osric (Hamlet), Sir Formal Trifle (The Virtuoso)
- 1993 – Second Tempter and Second Knight (Murder in the Cathedral), Lelio (The Venetian Twins)
- 1994 – Director [character name] (A Life in the Theatre)
- 1996 – Sir Andrew Aguecheek (Twelfth Night)
- 1997 – Cloten (Cymbeline), Dr Caius (The Merry Wives of Windsor)
- 1998 – Lord Chamberlain (Henry VIII)
- 1999 – Russayev (Yuri Gagarin), Octavius Caesar (Antony and Cleopatra)
- 2001 – Malvolio (Twelfth Night), King John (King John), Mosca (Volpone)
- 2003 – Parolles (All's Well That Ends Well)
- 2013 – Captain Hook (Wendy & Peter Pan)
- 2026 - Stephano (The Tempest), Pishchik (The Cherry Orchard)

=== Other theatre work ===
He has also worked with Cheek by Jowl, Theatre Set Up and the National Theatre (including Turgenev in Tom Stoppard's The Coast of Utopia in 2002).

He was an acclaimed Earl of Leicester in the 2005–06 Donmar Warehouse production of Schiller's Mary Stuart, which transferred to the West End. He had previously played the same character in the 1986 film Lady Jane. From December 2008 to March 2009 he appeared as Andrew Aguecheek (alongside Derek Jacobi) in the Donmar: West End production of Twelfth Night. In April and May 2009 he appeared in Hay Fever at the Chichester Festival Theatre.

== Television appearances ==
=== 1980s–1990s ===
In 1982, Henry appeared as Sherlock Holmes in the TV series Young Sherlock: The Mystery of the Manor House. He appeared in the episode "Rumpole and the Official Secret" from Season 4 of Rumpole of the Bailey in 1987. In the early 1990s, he played the acerbic, demonic Dr. Walpurgis in The Vault of Horror, an all-night BBC2 Halloween special. Dr. Walpurgis appeared in segments between showings of famous horror films. His make-up was provided by Hellraiser veteran Geoff Portass, with scripted introductions written by horror novelist and film historian Kim Newman. Between 1993 and 1996, Henry reprised the character (renamed Dr. Terror) in three series showcasing horror double-bills, called Dr. Terror's Vault of Horror (titled 'Dr. Terror Presents...' for the final series). Henry appeared in the 1996 schools series Look and Read: Spywatch, and in ITV's 1996 adaptation of Emma. In 1998 he appeared in the medical soap opera Peak Practice, and in two episodes of The Grand.

=== 2000 onwards ===
He appeared in four episodes of the 2001 series of the medical soap Doctors.

He has also frequently been cast as a conspiratorial and/or Machiavellian civil servant, as in Fields of Gold (2002) and Foyle's War (in a 2003 episode). He played the title role in Channel 4's 2004 documentary Who Killed Thomas Becket? (a "promotion" from his role as Tempter in the RSC Murder in the Cathedral, T. S. Eliot's version of the same story); and was a deportment tutor and a shoemaker respectively in the BBC's adaptation of The Young Visiters [sic] (2003) and Sherlock Holmes and the Case of the Silk Stocking (Christmas 2004). He played the part of Corporal Ludovic in the C4 presentation of Evelyn Waugh's Sword of Honour trilogy (2001) alongside the then relatively unknown Daniel Craig.

In 2004 he appeared in Waking the Dead series 3 "Multistorey" as Guy Reynolds.

In 2005 he appeared in the feature-length ITV drama Colditz and had a recurring role in Extras, which continued into a few episodes of the comedy's second season. He also had a small role in the ITV drama, Trial & Retribution IX: The Lovers. His main role that year, however, was as a fictionalised version of Gaius Cassius Longinus in the last two or three episodes of the first series of HBO/BBC series Rome. He reprised this role in the second series (broadcast 2007) until the character's death at the Battle of Philippi in the episode Philippi. His friend Sarah Kennedy (see #Radio) commented that this was a natural progression for one with his "lean and hungry look" (Shakespeare, Julius Caesar, 2.I).

In 2006, he played a lawyer in Midsomer Murders, appeared with Michael Sheen in Kenneth Williams: Fantabulosa! (as Hugh Paddick), and featured in the first, fifth and sixth episodes of the first series of The Chase (in another role he reprised in 2007). In 2007 he appeared as the UK's UN Ambassador in The Trial of Tony Blair and appeared in the seventh episode of the second series of Hotel Babylon. Also in 2007 he appeared on radio as Noël Coward in the Afternoon Play of 4 May 2007, "The Master and Mrs Tucker" by Roy Apps, which told of Coward's friendship with Edith Nesbit (played by Ann Bell).

In 2008, he appeared in HBO's John Adams as Jonathan Sewall, Massachusetts Attorney General, as Mr Collins in Lost in Austen, and in Series 7, Episode 4 of Spooks. In 2009 he appeared in Margaret and in Lewis (Series 4, Episode 1). Also in 2009 he appeared in several episodes of Ricky Gervais' BBC comedy Extras as the commissioning editor of BBC Comedy. In 2010 he appeared as a lawyer in an episode of The IT Crowd titled "Something Happened".

In October 2010 he joined the regular cast of Holby City as surgeon Henrik Hanssen, a role he played for three years until his departure in October 2013. In October 2014, it was announced that he would rejoin the cast of Holby City.

In October 2014, he appeared as the Inspector in the BBC 6-part drama Our Zoo. In January 2015, he appeared as hypnotist Arthur Welkin in the BBC series Father Brown in the episode "The Invisible Man". In October 2016, he appeared as Mr Murthwaite in the BBC mini-series The Moonstone. In November 2017, he appeared as the Dean of Westminster in the second season of the Rainmark Films series The Frankenstein Chronicles.

In 2023, he appeared in four episodes of Queen Charlotte: A Bridgerton Story as John Monro, George III's physician.

== Film ==
Henry's film credits include appearances in Another Country with Rupert Everett, Lady Jane, England, My England film by Tony Palmer, in Stephen Fry's 2003 film Bright Young Things (appearing in the poster for it, top left) as Archie Schwert, in V for Vendetta as Conrad Heyer, in Starter for 10 as a university professor, in Expresso, in Vincente Amorim's 2008 film Good as a senior doctor in Nazi Germany and as Pius Thicknesse in Harry Potter and the Deathly Hallows – Part 1 and Part 2.

In 2014, he appeared in the short film Done In.

In 2016, Henry appeared in Rogue One: A Star Wars Story, providing the physical and vocal performance for Grand Moff Tarkin; the use of CGI special effects recreated the likeness of Peter Cushing, who died in 1994, for the character. The performance was praised by Cushing's estate.

== Filmography ==
=== Film ===
Year	Film	Role	Notes
1984	Another Country	Head Boy	
1986	Lady Jane	Robert Dudley	
1995	England, My England	James II	
1997	Caught in the Act	Algie	
2003	Bright Young Things	Archie	
2004	EMR	Head Agent	
2005	V for Vendetta	Heyer	
2006	Starter for 10	Dr. Morrison	
2008	Filth and Wisdom	Lorcan O'Neill	
2008	Good	Doctor	
2009	Creation	Technician	
2010	Harry Potter and the Deathly Hallows: Part 1	Pius Thicknesse	
2011	Harry Potter and the Deathly Hallows: Part 2	Pius Thicknesse	
2016	Rogue One	Grand Moff Tarkin	
2018	The Krays: Dead Man Walking	Lord Boothby	

=== Television ===
Year	Film	Role	Notes
1982	Young Sherlock: The Mystery of the Manor House	Sherlock Holmes	8 episodes
1985	Family Ties Vacation	Jonathan	Television film
1986	The Two of Us	Estate Agent	Episode: "The End of the Beginning"
1987	Rumpole of the Bailey	Tim Warboys	Episode: "Rumpole and the Official Secret"
1987	A Small Problem	TV Reporter	Episode: "We'll Meet Again. Don't Know Where. Don't Know When"
1992	EastEnders	Waiter	2 episodes
1992	The Vault of Horror	Dr. Walpurgis	Television film
1993	Stay Lucky	Letchworth	Episode: "Gilding the Lily"
1993-1996	Dr. Terror's Vault of Horror	Dr. Terror	A hosted horror film introduction series
1995	The Plant	Harry the PR Man	Television film
1996	Emma	John Knightley	Television film
1996	Dr. Terror Presents	Dr. Terror	10 episodes
1996	Spywatch	Phillip Grainger	10 episodes
1998	Peak Practice	Dr. Martin Bryford	Episode: "A Matter of Principle"
1998	The Grand	Douglas Curzon	2 episodes
1999	Horizon	George Varley	Episode: "Wings of Angels"
2001	Sword of Honour	Ludovic	Television film
2001	Doctors	Giles Carey	5 episodes
2002	Fields of Gold	Andrew MacIntosh	Television film
2003	Waking the Dead	Guy Reynolds	2 episodes
2003	Home	Martin	Television film
2003	Foyle's War	John Bishop	Episode: "Fifty Ships"
2003	The Young Visiters	Mr. Domonic	Television film
2004	Who Killed Thomas Becket?	Thomas Becket	Television film
2004	Sherlock Holmes and the Case of the Silk Stocking	Mr. Bilney	Television film
2005	The Trial of the King Killers	Sir Heneage Finch	Documentary film
2005	Hustle	Samuel	Episode: "Confessions"
2005	Colditz	Sawyer	2 episodes
2005	Trial & Retribution	Charles Bingham QC	Episode: "The Lovers: Part 2"
2005–2007	Rome	Cassius	8 episodes
2005–2007	Extras	Iain Morris	4 episodes
2006	Kenneth Williams: Fantabulosa!	Hugh Paddick	Television film
2006	Midsomer Murders	Marcus Bramwell	Episode: "Last Year's Model"
2006–2007	The Chase	William Montgomery	9 episodes
2007	The Trial of Tony Blair	UN Ambassador	Television film
2007	Hotel Babylon	Neville Bellingham Thomas	Episode: "Episode #2.7"
2008	John Adams	Jonathan Sewall	Episode: "Join or Die"
2008	Lost in Austen	Mr. Collins	3 episodes
2008	Spooks	Sam Stevens	Episode: "Episode #7.4"
2008	Wallander	Erik Hokberg	Episode: "Firewall"
2009	Margaret	Tristan Garel-Jones	Television film
2009	Framed	Reynolds	Television film
2009	U Be Dead	Stephen Perrian	Television film
2009	Criminal Justice	Nick Holloway	3 episodes
2009	Murderland	Crawford	3 episodes
2009	Poirot	Matthew Waterhouse	Episode: "The Clocks"
2010	Lewis	Professor Pelham	Episode: "The Dead of Winter"
2010	The IT Crowd	Lawyer	Episode: "Something Happened"
2010–2022	Holby City	Henrik Hanssen	371 episodes
2011–2019	Casualty	Henrik Hanssen	14 episodes
2014	New Worlds	Randolph	3 episodes
2014	Our Zoo	Joseph Keene	Episode: "Episode #1.6"
2015	Father Brown	Arthur Welkin	Episode: "The Invisible Man"
2015	Count Arthur Strong	Psychiatrist	Episode: "Stuck in the Middle"
2015	Life in Squares	Leonard Woolf	2 episodes
2016	The Moonstone	Mr. Murthwaite	3 episodes
2016	Crew Low Budget	Ron Shortman	Television film
2017	The Frankenstein Chronicles	Dean of Westminster	3 episodes
2020	Roadkill	Trevor Quinn	2 episodes
2023	Queen Charlotte: A Bridgerton Story	Dr. John Monro	4 episodes
2024	Death in Paradise	Ray Saunders	Episode: "As the Sun Sets..."
2026	The Hairdresser Mysteries	Race Runard	
TBA	The Revengelists	Anthony le Trip	6 episodes Post-production

=== Short films ===
Year	Film	Role	Notes
2007	Expresso	Charles (Cream tea)	
2012	Who Shall I Play with Now?	Man on bike	
2014	Done In	Harry	
2014	Callow & Sons	Henry	
2014	The Leaf Blower	The Leaf Blower	
2015	Genius	Hermann Einstein	
2016	Retribution	Death	
2016	The Listener	Thomas	
2016	The Nightmare on Deskteeth Street	Secret Man	
2019	The Devil's Harmony	Headmaster Plugg	
2023	Road Kill	Richard	
TBA	All of Everything	Conscience	

== Radio ==
From around 2004 until the end of her show in 2010, Guy Henry gained an additional fanbase as a result of his friendship with the Radio 2 presenter Sarah Kennedy, who began by corresponding with his father. Through letters to Sarah from Henry himself, his father and "the Lady Agrippa" (a nickname for his mother), listeners were kept up to date on his career. A recording of his voice announced her regular "It's Showtime!" slot of tunes from the musicals at about 6.45am GMT – originally he just spoke the title of the slot, and a whole repertoire of different recordings was later added. He also occasionally appeared live on her show, and co-hosted with her as part of the annual charity appeal Children in Need.

Since 2022 he has hosted his own Sunday morning radio show (between 11am and 1pm) for Cosham based QA Radio which is also available to listen to online.

== Personal life ==
Henry learned to drive buses during a two year break from Holby City. He has taken a UK PCV test, which allows him the ability of driving coaches when he is not in acting employment.
