= 1975 in British music =

This is a summary of 1975 in music in the United Kingdom, including the official charts from that year.

== Events ==
- 13 February – The film Slade in Flame, starring the members of Slade, premieres at the Metropole Theatre in London.
- 2 March – Los Angeles Police make a routine traffic stop that turns out to be Paul McCartney and his wife Linda. Linda is arrested for having 170 to 225 grams (six to eight ounces) of marijuana in her pocketbook.
- 22 March – The Shadows represent the UK in the Eurovision Song Contest in Stockholm, Sweden. They come second.
- 26 March – The film version of the Who's Tommy premieres in London.
- 7 April – Ritchie Blackmore plays his final show with Deep Purple in Paris before quitting to form his own group, Rainbow.
- 24 April – Pete Ham, founder of the group Badfinger, is found hanged in his garage at home in Woking, Surrey. His death is ruled a suicide.
- 1 May – The Rolling Stones announce their forthcoming North American tour by performing "Brown Sugar" from a flatbed truck on Fifth Avenue in New York City. The occasion was guitarist Ronnie Wood's debut with the band.
- 4 August – Robert Plant and his wife Maureen are seriously injured in a car accident while vacationing on the Greek island of Rhodes. The immediate future of Led Zeppelin is cast into doubt, as Plant will not recover for quite some time.
- 23 August – Peter Gabriel leaves progressive rock group Genesis.
- 3 October – The Who release their seventh studio album The Who By Numbers.
- 7 October – John Lennon finally wins his battle to stay in the United States after the New York Court of Appeals overturns Lennon's 1972 deportation order.
- 9 October – John Lennon and Yoko Ono become parents of Sean Ono Lennon at 2:00 AM. The birth heralds the beginning of John's temporary retirement from the music business as he vows to devote himself to family for the next five years.
- 31 October – Queen's "Bohemian Rhapsody" is released. It goes to number one for nine weeks, and as of 2015 is the biggest-selling non-charity single in UK history.
- 6 November – The Sex Pistols play their first concert at St. Martin's School of Art in London.
- 18 December – The official break-up of the Faces is announced at a London press conference. Rod Stewart continues his solo career while Ronnie Wood joins the Rolling Stones.
- 25 December – Iron Maiden is formed in Leyton, east London, by bassist Steve Harris.

== Number-one records ==
=== Singles ===
Chart date (week ending)	Song	Artist(s)
11 January	"Lonely This Christmas"	Mud
18 January	"Down Down"	Status Quo
25 January	"Ms Grace"	The Tymes
1 February	"January"	Pilot
8 February	"January"	Pilot
15 February	"January"	Pilot
22 February	"Make Me Smile (Come Up and See Me)"	Steve Harley & Cockney Rebel
1 March	"Make Me Smile (Come Up and See Me)"	Steve Harley & Cockney Rebel
8 March	"If"	Telly Savalas
15 March	"If"	Telly Savalas
22 March	"Bye Bye Baby"	Bay City Rollers
29 March	"Bye Bye Baby"	Bay City Rollers
6 April	"Bye Bye Baby"	Bay City Rollers
13 April	"Bye Bye Baby"	Bay City Rollers
20 April	"Bye Bye Baby"	Bay City Rollers
27 April	"Bye Bye Baby"	Bay City Rollers
3 May	"Oh Boy!"	Mud
10 May	"Oh Boy!"	Mud
17 May	"Stand by Your Man"	Tammy Wynette
24 May	"Stand by Your Man"	Tammy Wynette
31 May	"Stand by Your Man"	Tammy Wynette
7 June	"Whispering Grass"	Windsor Davies and Don Estelle
14 June	"Whispering Grass"	Windsor Davies and Don Estelle
21 June	"Whispering Grass"	Windsor Davies and Don Estelle
28 June	"I'm Not in Love"	10cc
5 July	"I'm Not in Love"	10cc
12 July	"Tears on My Pillow"	Johnny Nash
19 July	"Give a Little Love"	Bay City Rollers
26 July	"Give a Little Love"	Bay City Rollers
2 August	"Give a Little Love"	Bay City Rollers
9 August	"Barbados"	Typically Tropical
16 August	"Can't Give You Anything (But My Love)"	The Stylistics
23 August	"Can't Give You Anything (But My Love)"	The Stylistics
30 August	"Can't Give You Anything (But My Love)"	The Stylistics
6 September	"Sailing"	Rod Stewart
13 September	"Sailing"	Rod Stewart
20 September	"Sailing"	Rod Stewart
27 September	"Sailing"	Rod Stewart
4 October	"Hold Me Close"	David Essex
11 October	"Hold Me Close"	David Essex
18 October	"Hold Me Close"	David Essex
25 October	"I Only Have Eyes for You"	Art Garfunkel
1 November	"I Only Have Eyes for You"	Art Garfunkel
8 November	"Space Oddity"	David Bowie
15 November	"Space Oddity"	David Bowie
22 November	"D.I.V.O.R.C.E."	Billy Connolly
29 November	"Bohemian Rhapsody"	Queen
6 December	"Bohemian Rhapsody"	Queen
13 December	"Bohemian Rhapsody"	Queen
20 December	"Bohemian Rhapsody"	Queen
27 December	"Bohemian Rhapsody"	Queen
3 January	"Bohemian Rhapsody"	Queen

=== Albums ===
Date	Single	Artist	Weeks
11 January	Greatest Hits	Elton John	4
18 January	Greatest Hits	Elton John	4
25 January	Greatest Hits	Elton John	4
1 February	Greatest Hits	Elton John	4
8 February	His Greatest Hits	Engelbert Humperdinck	3
15 February	His Greatest Hits	Engelbert Humperdinck	3
22 February	His Greatest Hits	Engelbert Humperdinck	3
1 March	On the Level	Status Quo	2
8 March	On the Level	Status Quo	2
15 March	Physical Graffiti	Led Zeppelin	1
22 March	20 Greatest Hits	Tom Jones	4
29 March	20 Greatest Hits	Tom Jones	4
5 April	20 Greatest Hits	Tom Jones	4
12 April	20 Greatest Hits	Tom Jones	4
19 April	The Best of the Stylistics	The Stylistics	2
26 April	The Best of the Stylistics	The Stylistics	2
3 May	Once Upon a Star	Bay City Rollers	3
10 May	Once Upon a Star	Bay City Rollers	3
17 May	Once Upon a Star	Bay City Rollers	3
24 May	The Best of the Stylistics	The Stylistics	5
31 May	The Best of the Stylistics	The Stylistics	5
7 June	The Best of the Stylistics	The Stylistics	5
14 June	The Best of the Stylistics	The Stylistics	5
21 June	The Best of the Stylistics	The Stylistics	5
28 June	Venus and Mars	Wings	1
5 July	Horizon	The Carpenters	2
12 July	Horizon	The Carpenters	2
19 July	Venus and Mars	Wings	1
26 July	Horizon	The Carpenters	3
2 August	Horizon	The Carpenters	3
9 August	Horizon	The Carpenters	3
16 August	The Best of the Stylistics	The Stylistics	2
23 August	The Best of the Stylistics	The Stylistics	2
30 August	Atlantic Crossing	Rod Stewart	5
6 September	Atlantic Crossing	Rod Stewart	5
13 September	Atlantic Crossing	Rod Stewart	5
20 September	Atlantic Crossing	Rod Stewart	5
27 September	Atlantic Crossing	Rod Stewart	5
4 October	Wish You Were Here	Pink Floyd	1
11 October	Atlantic Crossing	Rod Stewart	2
18 October	Atlantic Crossing	Rod Stewart	2
25 October	40 Golden Greats	Jim Reeves	3
1 November	40 Golden Greats	Jim Reeves	3
8 November	40 Golden Greats	Jim Reeves	3
15 November	We All Had Doctors' Papers	Max Boyce	1
22 November	40 Greatest Hits	Perry Como	5
29 November	40 Greatest Hits	Perry Como	5
6 December	40 Greatest Hits	Perry Como	5
13 December	40 Greatest Hits	Perry Como	5
20 December	40 Greatest Hits	Perry Como	5
27 December	A Night at the Opera	Queen	2
3 January	A Night at the Opera	Queen	2

== Year-end charts ==
=== Best-selling singles ===
Sales between 30 December 1974 and 5 December 1975.

No.	Title	Artist	Peak position
1	"Bye Bye Baby"	Bay City Rollers	1
2	"Sailing"	Rod Stewart	1
3	"Can't Give You Anything (But My Love)"	The Stylistics	1
4	"Whispering Grass"	Windsor Davies and Don Estelle	1
5	"Stand by Your Man"	Tammy Wynette	1
6	"Give a Little Love"	Bay City Rollers	1
7	"Hold Me Close"	David Essex	1
8	"The Last Farewell"	Roger Whittaker	2
9	"I Only Have Eyes for You"	Art Garfunkel	1
10	"Tears on My Pillow"	Johnny Nash	1
11	"I'm Not in Love"	10cc	1
12	"Barbados"	Typically Tropical	1
13	"If"	Telly Savalas	1
14	"There Goes My First Love"	The Drifters	3
15	"Three Steps to Heaven"	Showaddywaddy	2
16	"The Hustle"	Van McCoy	3
17	"Space Oddity"	David Bowie	1
18	"January"	Pilot	1
19	"Funky Moped"/"The Magic Roundabout"	Jasper Carrott	5
20	"Make Me Smile (Come Up and See Me)"	Steve Harley and Cockney Rebel	1
21	"Oh Boy"	Mud	1
22	"Bohemian Rhapsody"	Queen	1
23	"Misty"	Ray Stevens	2
24	"Lovin' You"	Minnie Ripperton	2
25	"The Way We Were"–"Try to Remember"	Gladys Knight & the Pips	4
26	"Sugar Candy Kisses"	Mac and Katie Kissoon	3
27	"There's a Whole Lot of Loving"	Guys & Dolls	2
28	"Please Mr. Postman"	The Carpenters	2
29	"Sing Baby Sing"	The Stylistics	3
30	"Love Is the Drug"	Roxy Music	2
31	"Rhinestone Cowboy"	Glen Campbell	4
32	"Moonlighting"	Leo Sayer	2
33	"D.I.V.O.R.C.E."	Billy Connolly	1
34	"Hurt So Good"	Susan Cadogan	4
35	"Only You Can"	Fox	3
36	"Honey"	Bobby Goldsboro	2
37	"Fox on the Run"	Sweet	2
38	"Blanket on the Ground"	Billie Jo Spears	6
39	"It's Been So Long"	George McCrae	4
40	"Scotch on the Rocks"	Band of the Black Watch	8
41	"You Sexy Thing"	Hot Chocolate	2
42	"Feelings"	Morris Albert	4
43	"The Secrets That You Keep"	Mud	3
44	"If You Think You Know How to Love Me"	Smokie	3
45	"The Bump"	Kenny	3
46	"I'm on Fire"	5000 Volts	4
47	"Love Me Love My Dog"	Peter Shelley	3
48	"SOS"	ABBA	6
49	"That's the Way (I Like It)"	KC & the Sunshine Band	4
50	"Disco Stomp"	Hamilton Bohannon	6

=== Best-selling albums ===
The list of the top fifty best-selling albums of 1975 was published in Music Week in the issue dated 27 December 1975 and in Record Mirror & Disc magazine in the issue dated 10 January 1976, and reproduced in the first edition of the BPI Year Book in 1976. However, in 2007 the Official Charts Company published album chart histories for each year from 1956 to 1977, researched by historian Sharon Mawer, and included an updated list of the top ten best-selling albums for each year based on the new research. The updated top ten for 1975 is shown below.

No.	Title	Artist	Peak position
1	The Best of the Stylistics	The Stylistics	1
2	Once Upon a Star	Bay City Rollers	1
3	Atlantic Crossing	Rod Stewart	1
4	40 Golden Greats	Jim Reeves	1
5	Venus and Mars	Wings	1
6	40 Greatest Hits	Elvis Presley	16 (Note: Greatest Hits was not eligible for the album chart until July 1975, as television-advertised compilations were excluded from the chart until this date. Most of the album's sales were during late 1974 and early 1975, and by the time it was readmitted to the album chart its sales had tailed off. The album did not officially reach number one until September 1977, following Presley's death.)
7	Greatest Hits	Elton John	1
8	Horizon	The Carpenters	1
9	Tubular Bells	Mike Oldfield	2 (Note: Reached number 1 in 1974)
10	40 Greatest Hits	Perry Como	1

== Classical music: new works ==
- Benjamin Britten –
  - Phaedra
  - String Quartet No. 3

== Film and incidental music ==
- Stanley Myers – Conduct Unbecoming, starring Michael York, Richard Attenborough and Trevor Howard

== Musical films ==
- The Who – Tommy

== Births ==
- 3 January – Rebecca Onslow, singer (Solid HarmoniE)
- 6 January – Gabriel Prokofiev, Russian-British composer
- 7 January – Neil Watts, singer (Code Red)
- 9 January – Glen Clarke, Irish singer (OTT)
- 13 January – Jason King, radio DJ
- 15 January – Edith Bowman, radio DJ
- 19 January – Kule T, singer (MN8)
- 24 January
  - Isobel Cooper, soprano
  - Paul Marazzi, singer (A1)
- 28 January – Lee Latchford-Evans, singer (Steps)
- 12 March – Kéllé Bryan, singer (Eternal)
- 17 March – Justin Hawkins, vocalist (The Darkness)
- 25 March – Melanie Blatt, singer (All Saints)
- 1 April – Suzy Klein, music writer and presenter
- 23 May – Darren Styles, record producer
- 29 May – Melanie Brown, singer (Spice Girls)
- 4 June – Russell Brand, radio DJ
- 18 June – Jem, Welsh singer-songwriter and producer
- 23 June – KT Tunstall, singer-songwriter and guitarist
- 9 July – Shona Fraser, British-born music journalist
- 18 July – M.I.A., rapper and producer
- 15 August – Phillip Rodell, singer (Code Red)
- 4 September – Mark Ronson, DJ and music producer
- 8 September – Richard Hughes, drummer (Keane)
- 23 September – Chris Hawkins, radio DJ
- 9 October – Sean Ono Lennon, son of John Lennon and Yoko Ono
- 14 October – Shaznay Lewis, singer (All Saints)
- 25 October – Melissa Graham, singer (Solid HarmoniE)
- 5 November – Lisa Scott-Lee, singer (Steps)
- 14 November – Faye Tozer, singer (Steps)
- 25 November – Paul Mealor, composer
- 29 November – Alan Fitzsimons, Irish singer (OTT)
- 12 December – Michael Harwood, guitarist (Ultra)

== Deaths ==
- 8 February – Martyn Green, actor and singer, 75
- 13 February – Eric Thiman, composer, 74
- 13 March – Jeannie Robertson, folk singer, 66/67
- 27 March – Sir Arthur Bliss, Master of the Queen's Musick, 83
- 14 April – Michael Flanders, lyricist, actor, humorist and singer (Flanders and Swann), 53 (intracranial berry aneurysm)
- 15 April – John D. H. Greenwood, film composer, 75
- 21 April – Sir Jack Westrup, musicologist, writer, teacher and occasional conductor and composer, 70
- 24 April – Pete Ham, singer and songwriter (Badfinger), 27 (suicide)
- 26 April – Godfrey Winham, English-born US music theorist and composer of contemporary classical music, 40
- 2 August – Muir Mathieson, conductor and composer, 64 (oesophageal cancer)
- 13 November – Lambert Williamson, composer and conductor, 68

== See also ==
- 1975 in British radio
- 1975 in British television
- 1975 in the United Kingdom
- List of British films of 1975
