= 1975 in British radio =

This is a list of events in British radio during 1975.

== Events ==
=== January ===
- 1 January – BBC Radio Ulster launches as a full time station. It replaces what had been a Northern Ireland opt-out of BBC Radio 4.
- 6 January – BBC Radio 2's broadcasting hours are reduced due to budget cuts at the BBC. The former 5 am – 2 am schedule is reduced to a 6 am start up Mondays to Saturdays with a 6:55 am start up on Sundays. The station closes down at around 12:33 am each day. Another consequence on the cuts is that David Hamilton's afternoon show is broadcast on both Radio 1 and Radio 2.
- 22 January – Radio Forth begins broadcasting to the Edinburgh area.

=== February to April ===
- No events.

=== May ===
- 19 May – Plymouth Sound begins broadcasting to the Plymouth area.

=== June ===
- 9 June – Proceedings in the Parliament of the United Kingdom are broadcast on radio for the first time.
- 24 June – Radio Tees begins broadcasting to the Teesside area.

=== July ===
- 3 July – Radio Trent beings broadcasting to the Nottingham area.

=== August ===
- No events.

=== September ===
- 16 September – Pennine Radio begins broadcasting to the Bradford area.
- 29 September – BBC Radio 2's broadcasting hours are further reduced when the station closes slightly earlier, concluding its day at around 12:10 am Mondays to Fridays, and at 12:33 am on Saturdays and Sundays.
- September – The first edition of The Sunday Request Show is broadcast on BBC Radio 1. Presented by Annie Nightingale, the show runs until the end of 1979 before being re-introduced as an evening programme in 1982.

=== October ===
- October – Kenny Everett plays Queen's "Bohemian Rhapsody" repeatedly on his radio show, forcing their record company to release it as a single.
- 14 October – Radio Victory begins broadcasting to the Portsmouth area.
- 28 October – Radio Orwell begins broadcasting to the Ipswich area.

=== November to December ===
- No events.

== Station debuts ==
- 1 January – BBC Radio Ulster
- 22 January – Radio Forth
- 19 May – Plymouth Sound
- 24 June – Radio Tees
- 3 July – Radio Trent
- 16 September – Pennine Radio
- 14 October – Radio Victory
- 28 October – Radio Orwell

== Programme debuts ==
- 1 October – The News Huddlines on BBC Radio 2 (1975–2001)

== Continuing radio programmes ==
=== 1940s ===
- Sunday Half Hour (1940–2018)
- Desert Island Discs (1942–Present)
- Down Your Way (1946–1992)
- Letter from America (1946–2004)
- Woman's Hour (1946–Present)
- A Book at Bedtime (1949–Present)

=== 1950s ===
- The Archers (1950–Present)
- The Today Programme (1957–Present)
- The Navy Lark (1959–1977)
- Sing Something Simple (1959–2001)
- Your Hundred Best Tunes (1959–2007)

=== 1960s ===
- Farming Today (1960–Present)
- In Touch (1961–Present)
- The Men from the Ministry (1962–1977)
- Petticoat Line (1965–1979)
- The World at One (1965–Present)
- The Official Chart (1967–Present)
- Just a Minute (1967–Present)
- The Living World (1968–Present)
- The Organist Entertains (1969–2018)

=== 1970s ===
- PM (1970–Present)
- Start the Week (1970–Present)
- Week Ending (1970–1998)
- You and Yours (1970–Present)
- I'm Sorry I Haven't a Clue (1972–Present)
- Good Morning Scotland (1973–Present)
- Hello Cheeky (1973–1979)
- Kaleidoscope (1973–1998)
- Newsbeat (1973–Present)

== Births ==
- January – Adam Rutherford, geneticist and science broadcaster
- 22 January – Rachel Burden, news presenter
- 24 January – Lucy Montgomery, comedy actress
- 25 February – Naga Munchetty, broadcast news presenter
- 31 March – Jonny Saunders, radio sports reporter, presenter and commentator
- 1 April – Suzy Klein, arts broadcast presenter
- 25 July – Margaret Cabourn-Smith, comedy actress
- 31 July – Stephanie Hirst, radio presenter
- 23 September – Chris Hawkins, radio presenter
- 20 November – Jason Mohammad, radio and television presenter
- 30 November – Richard Bacon, broadcast presenter
- 15 December – Ayesha Hazarika, Scottish broadcast journalist, political adviser and comedian
- Catherine Shepherd, comedy actress

== Deaths ==
- 26 February – Denis Goodwin, comedy scriptwriter and radio presenter, suicide (born 1929)
- 3 March – Sandy MacPherson, theatre organist (born 1897)
- 4 March – Gillie Potter, comedian (born 1887)
- 3 April – Jacques Brown, radio comedy producer (born 1900)
- 10 November – William Hardcastle, radio news presenter (born 1918)

== See also ==
- 1975 in British music
- 1975 in British television
- 1975 in the United Kingdom
- List of British films of 1975
