= List of British films of 1975 =

British films released in 1975

A list of films produced in the United Kingdom in 1975 (see 1975 in film):

== 1975 ==
Title	Director	Cast	Genre	Notes
1975
The Adventure of Sherlock Holmes' Smarter Brother	Gene Wilder	Gene Wilder, Marty Feldman, Madeline Kahn	Comedy	Co-production with US
Alfie Darling	Ken Hughes	Alan Price, Jill Townsend, Joan Collins	Comedy drama	
All Creatures Great and Small	Claude Whatham	Simon Ward, Anthony Hopkins, Lisa Harrow	Comedy	
The Amorous Milkman	Derren Nesbitt	Diana Dors, Brendan Price, Julie Ege	Sex comedy	
Autobiography of a Princess	James Ivory	James Mason, Madhur Jaffrey, Diane Fletcher	Drama	
Barry Lyndon	Stanley Kubrick	Ryan O'Neal, Marisa Berenson, Patrick Magee	Historical	Winner of four Academy Awards
Brannigan	Douglas Hickox	John Wayne, Judy Geeson, Richard Attenborough	Crime drama	
Carry On Behind	Gerald Thomas	Kenneth Williams, Elke Sommer, Windsor Davies	Comedy	
Conduct Unbecoming	Michael Anderson	Michael York, Richard Attenborough, Trevor Howard	Drama	
Confessions of a Pop Performer	Norman Cohen	Robin Askwith, Antony Booth, Carol Hawkins	Sex comedy	
Deadly Strangers	Sidney Hayers	Hayley Mills, Simon Ward, Sterling Hayden	Thriller	
Diagnosis: Murder	Sidney Hayers	Jon Finch, Judy Geeson, Christopher Lee	Mystery thriller	
Dick Deadeye, or Duty Done	Bill Melendez	Victor Spinetti, Miriam Karlin, Barry Cryer	Animated Musical	
Eskimo Nell	Martin Campbell	Christopher Timothy, Roy Kinnear, Katy Manning	Sex comedy	
Flame	Richard Loncraine	Slade, Tom Conti, Alan Lake	Musical	
Galileo	Joseph Losey	Chaim Topol, Edward Fox, John Gielgud	Biopic	Co-production with US
The Ghoul	Freddie Francis	Peter Cushing, John Hurt, Alexandra Bastedo	Horror	
The Great McGonagall	Joseph McGrath	Spike Milligan, Peter Sellers, Julia Foster	Comedy	
Hedda	Trevor Nunn	Glenda Jackson, Peter Eyre, Timothy West	Drama	Film of Ibsen's play Hedda Gabler
Hennessy	Don Sharp	Rod Steiger, Lee Remick, Trevor Howard	Thriller	
The Human Factor	Edward Dmytryk	George Kennedy, John Mills, Raf Vallone	Thriller	Co-production with US
I Don't Want to Be Born	Peter Sasdy	Joan Collins, Ralph Bates, Eileen Atkins	Horror	
In Celebration	Lindsay Anderson	Alan Bates, Bill Owen, Brian Cox	Drama	Filmed play by David Storey
Inserts	John Byrum	Richard Dreyfuss, Veronica Cartwright, Jessica Harper	Comedy drama	
Inside Out	Peter Duffell	Telly Savalas, Robert Culp, James Mason	Thriller	
Intimate Reflections	Don Boyd	Anton Rodgers, Peter Vaughan, Derek Bond	Drama	
Legend of the Werewolf	Freddie Francis	Peter Cushing, Ron Moody, Hugh Griffith	Horror	
The Lifetaker	Michael Papas	Terence Morgan, Peter Duncan, Lea Brodie	Thriller	
Lisztomania	Ken Russell	Roger Daltrey, Sara Kestelman, Fiona Lewis	Musical	
The Maids	Christopher Miles	Glenda Jackson, Susannah York, Vivien Merchant	Drama	Co-production with US
Man Friday	Jack Gold	Richard Roundtree, Peter O'Toole, Peter Cellier	Adventure	Entered into the 1975 Cannes Film Festival
The Man Who Would Be King	John Huston	Sean Connery, Michael Caine, Christopher Plummer	Adventure	Co-production with US
Mister Quilp	Michael Tuchner	Anthony Newley, David Hemmings, Jill Bennett	Musical	
Monty Python and the Holy Grail	Terry Jones, Terry Gilliam	Monty Python, Carol Cleveland, Neil Innes	Comedy	First original film by Monty Python
One of Our Dinosaurs Is Missing	Robert Stevenson	Peter Ustinov, Helen Hayes, Clive Revill	Comedy	
Out of Season	Alan Bridges	Vanessa Redgrave, Cliff Robertson, Susan George	Drama	Entered into the 25th Berlin International Film Festival
Paper Tiger	Ken Annakin	David Niven, Toshirō Mifune, Hardy Krüger	Thriller	
Penelope Pulls It Off	Peter Curran	Linda Marlowe, Anna Bergman, Nicholas Day	Sex comedy	
Permission to Kill	Cyril Frankel	Dirk Bogarde, Ava Gardner, Timothy Dalton	Spy thriller	Co-production with Austria
Ransom	Caspar Wrede	Sean Connery, Ian McShane, Robert Harris	Thriller	
The Return of the Pink Panther	Blake Edwards	Peter Sellers, Christopher Plummer, Herbert Lom	Comedy	Co-production with US
The Rocky Horror Picture Show	Jim Sharman	Tim Curry, Susan Sarandon, Barry Bostwick	Musical	Co-production with US
The Romantic Englishwoman	Joseph Losey	Michael Caine, Glenda Jackson, Helmut Berger	Drama	Co-production with France
Royal Flash	Richard Lester	Malcolm McDowell, Oliver Reed, Alan Bates	Adventure	
Russian Roulette	Lou Lombardo	George Segal, Cristina Raines, Denholm Elliott	Thriller	Co-production with Canada
Side by Side	Bruce Beresford	Terry-Thomas, Barry Humphries, Stephanie de Sykes	Musical	
Spanish Fly	Bob Kellett	Terry-Thomas, Leslie Phillips, Nadiuska	Comedy	Co-production with Spain
The Spiral Staircase	Peter Collinson	Jacqueline Bisset, Christopher Plummer, Sam Wanamaker	Thriller	
That Lucky Touch	Christopher Miles	Roger Moore, Susannah York, Shelley Winters	Comedy	Co-production with West Germany
Three for All	Martin Campbell	Adrienne Posta, Robert Lindsay, Paul Nicholas	Comedy	
Tommy	Ken Russell	Roger Daltrey, Oliver Reed, Ann-Margret,	Musical	
The Ups and Downs of a Handyman	John Sealey	Barry Stokes, Sue Lloyd, Penny Meredith	Sex comedy	
The Wilby Conspiracy	Ralph Nelson	Sidney Poitier, Michael Caine, Nicol Williamson	Thriller	
What Changed Charley Farthing?	Sidney Hayers	Doug McClure, Hayley Mills, Lionel Jeffries	Comedy	

== Documentaries and shorts ==
Title	Director	Cast	Genre	Notes
Brother, Can You Spare a Dime?	Philippe Mora	Newsreel footage of various personages of the 1930s	Documentary	
The Hostages	David Eady	Julian Holloway, Robin Askwith	Family	
Overlord	Stuart Cooper			Won the Jury Grand Prix at Berlin
Winstanley	Kevin Brownlow	Miles Halliwell	Drama	

== Top films at British box office in 1975 ==
1. The Towering Inferno
2. The Exorcist
3. The Man with the Golden Gun
4. Emmanuelle
5. Earthquake
6. Airport 1975
7. Murder on the Orient Express
8. Papillon
9. Stardust
10. The Island at the Top of the World
11. Confessions of a Window Cleaner
12. Tommy
13. Blazing Saddles
14. The Land That Time Forgot
15. Death Wish
16. The Four Musketeers
17. Freebie and the Bean
18. Lady and the Tramp (1955)
19. Monty Python and the Holy Grail
20. Rollerball

== See also ==
- 1975 in British music
- 1975 in British radio
- 1975 in British television
- 1975 in the United Kingdom
