= Who Killed Thomas Becket? =

Who Killed Thomas_Becket?
- Directed by: Andrew Chater
- Starring: Guy Henry
- Release date: 2000

Who did Kill Thomas Becket in 1170? is a 2000 Channel 4 documentary concerning the murder of Thomas Becket, who was Archbishop of Canterbury from 1162 to 1170. He is venerated as a saint and martyr by both the Roman Catholic Church and the Anglican Communion.

Becket engaged in conflict with Henry II of England over the rights and privileges of the Church and was assassinated by followers of the king in Canterbury Cathedral.

The documentary was directed by Andrew Chater and had appearances by actors Guy Henry as Thomas Becket, Rupert Wickham as Henry II, Alastair Cording as Foliot, Roger Monk as De Broc and Robert Glenister as the Narrator. The documentary took a fresh look at the murder of the medieval archbishop, and suggested that established historical theories concerning the killing fall short of explaining why Becket was murdered, and on whose orders. It featured powerful dramatisations and contributions from eminent scholars, telling a compelling story of the conflict between State and Church.
