= Irene Thomas =

British radio personality

Irene Thomas (born Elsie Irene Ready) (28 June 1920 – 27 March 2001) was a British radio personality, well known for her participation in quiz shows and panel games from the 1960s until shortly before her death.

== Early life and education ==
Thomas was born in Feltham, Middlesex into a working-class family, the daughter of Edmund R. Ready, a clarinettist in a military band. Her mother, born Ethel E. Crapnell, worked as a seamstress for 'Frederick Gorringe Limited', a large department store on Buckingham Palace Road.

She attended Ashford County Grammar School where she was considered to have the potential to win a scholarship to the University of Oxford, but she left at fifteen to work as a clerk at the Inland Revenue.

== Career ==
Thomas's first full-time job, aged fifteen, circa 1936, was as a clerk at the Inland Revenue. During the Second World War she worked in the National Fire Service.

=== Music and broadcasting ===
In 1946 Thomas embarked on a career as a musician and singer when she joined the chorus at Covent Garden and took small roles as a light mezzo-soprano. She branched out into session singing, joined the George Mitchell Minstrels and became the familiar voice of many radio and television advertising jingles in the 1950s.

In 1959 while recovering from cancer surgery she applied to join Mensa: her IQ was rated at 160.

In 1961 she entered and won radio's Brain of Britain contest. This heralded a forty-year period as a mainstay of radio panel game quiz programmes. In 1967, after much lobbying of the producers, she joined the panel on Round Britain Quiz, regarded as the most erudite of the BBC's quiz shows, and rapidly became its most celebrated panellist.

In the 1970s she co presented a BBC daytime television programme entitled The 607080 Show with Roy Hudd.

== Writing ==
Her autobiography, The Bandsman's Daughter, was published in 1979.

She was a columnist for Woman & Home magazine for many years.

== Personal life and death ==
Thomas's first marriage, in 1940, was to John Wesley Baldry, but they divorced in 1949.

From 1950 until her death she was married to Eddie Thomas, a fellow singer in the chorus at Covent Garden, who later became a teacher. She was a sister-in-law of the novelist Gwyn Thomas.

In 1986, she became a patron of the Polite Society, an organisation supporting good manners.

Thomas died in 2001, aged 80.
