= Homefield School =

School in Winkton, Dorset, England

Coordinates: 50°45′44″N 1°46′15″W

Homefield School (closed Feb. 10, 2005) was a school for boys and girls aged four to 18 in Winkton, Dorset, England.

The school occupied a large, cream-painted building with a sign announcing "Sports Academy. Dorset Lawn Tennis Association School of the Year." Over the door was an inscription: "Ratione Non Vi" (By reason, not by force). There were 2 departments, Preparatory and Senior - the prep school was a self-contained unit with a play area.

Homefield had extensive playing fields overlooking farmland.

For years 7–11, subjects included the core subjects: English, Maths and Physical Education plus optional subjects: Art (Painting & Drawing), Art (Three Dimensional), Biology, Chemistry, Physics, Geography, Home Economics (Food), and Information Technology (Computers).

== Closure ==
Homefield School closed permanently in January 2005.
