= Ian Riches (cricketer) =

English cricketer (born 1975)

Ian Riches (born 12 September 1975 in Lincoln) is an English former List A cricketer active 1995 who played for Nottinghamshire.
