= The 607080 Show =

- Created by: Brigit Barry, Giles Oakley
- Presented by: Roy Hudd, Irene Thomas
- Country of origin: United Kingdom

Original release
- Network: BBC1
- Release: 12 January 1975 – 22 June 1980

The 607080 Show is a 1970s British lifestyle television programme aimed at retired people that was presented by Roy Hudd and Irene Thomas.

The studio based programme was directed by Giles Oakley, produced for BBC1 by Brigit Barry and broadcast on Sundays. It included financial advice, health tips and hobbies for older people, nostalgic music and guests such as the Minister of State for Social Security Alf Morris. The title of the programme was pronounced '6 O 7 O 8 O show'. Roy Hudd was under 40 at the time and neither presenter was in the target age range when the programme was first broadcast.
