= 1975 in the United Kingdom =

Events from the year 1975 in the United Kingdom.

== Incumbents ==
- Monarch – Elizabeth II
- Prime Minister – Harold Wilson (Labour)

== Events ==
=== January ===
- 6 January – Brian Clough, the former manager of Derby County and more recently Leeds United, is appointed manager of Football League Second Division strugglers Nottingham Forest.
- 14 January – Seventeen-year-old heiress Lesley Whittle, daughter of bus operator George Whittle (1905–1967), is kidnapped at gunpoint from her home near Bridgnorth in Shropshire by Donald Neilson.
- 15 January – International Women's Year is launched in Britain by Princess Alexandra and Barbara Castle.
- 20 January – The 1974 Channel Tunnel project is abandoned.
- 23 January – An express train is derailed at Watford Junction, and the driver is killed.
- 24 January – Donald Coggan is enthroned as the Archbishop of Canterbury.

=== February ===
- 6 February – Jensen, the British luxury carmaker, makes 700 of its employees redundant – cutting its workforce by two-thirds.
- 11 February – Margaret Thatcher defeats Edward Heath in the Conservative Party leadership election, becoming the party's first female leader. Thatcher, 49, was Education Secretary in Heath's government from 1970 to 1974.
- 13 February – Britain's coal miners accept a 35% pay rise offer from the government.
- 14 February
  - Evolutionary biologist and author Sir Julian Huxley dies aged 87 in London.
  - Author and humorist P. G. Wodehouse dies of heart failure aged 91 at Southampton, New York, United States, one month after being awarded a knighthood.
- 26 February – A fleeing Provisional Irish Republican Army member shoots and kills an off-duty Metropolitan Police officer, Stephen Tibble, 22, in London as he gives chase.
- 28 February – The Moorgate tube crash on the London Underground; 43 people are killed.

=== March ===
- 1 March – Aston Villa, chasing promotion from the Football League Second Division, win the Football League Cup with the only goal of the Wembley final against Norwich City being scored by Ray Graydon.
- 4 March – Actor Charlie Chaplin, 85, is knighted by the Queen.
- 7 March – The body of teenage heiress Lesley Whittle, who was kidnapped at gunpoint from her Shropshire home in January, is discovered in Staffordshire, strangled on a ledge in drains below Bathpool Park near Kidsgrove.
- 8 March – First appearance of Davros in Doctor Who.
- 25 March – A large National Front rally is held in London, in protest against European integration.
- 26 March – British Leyland releases their new family saloon, the Morris 18-22 wedge styled by Harris Mann to replace the ageing Austin 1800 Landcrab range. There are Austin, Morris and the luxury Wolseley versions at launch. However, in less than six months, the entire range is rebranded as the Princess and the marque "Wolseley" is abandoned.
- March – Unemployment exceeds the 1,000,000 mark for this month (announced 24 April).

=== April ===
- 3 April – Monty Python and the Holy Grail is released to cinemas in the UK.
- 5 April – Manchester United clinches promotion back to the First Division one season after relegation.
- 13 April – A 22-year-old woman is raped at her bedsit in Cambridge. Cambridgeshire Police believe that she is the sixth victim of a rapist who has been operating across the city since October last year. In June, the police arrest 47-year-old Peter Cook for the rapes; he is sentenced to life imprisonment in October.
- 26 April
  - A conference of Labour Party members votes against continued membership of the EEC.
  - Derby County win the Football League First Division title for the second time in four seasons.

=== May ===
- May – Led Zeppelin return to the UK to play five sold-out shows at Earls Court in London.
- 1 May – Vauxhall launches the Chevette, Britain's first production small hatchback, which is similar in concept to the Italian Fiat 127 and French Renault 5.
- 3 May – West Ham United win the second FA Cup of their history by defeating Fulham 2–0 in the Wembley final. Alan Taylor scores both goals. Former West Ham and England legend Bobby Moore appears for Fulham.
- 5 May – St Leonard's Church, Streatham, London, is gutted by fire.
- 16 May – Major reorganisation of local government in Scotland under the Local Government (Scotland) Act 1973, creating nine new regions and comprehensively redrawing the administrative map. Strathclyde is created out of the historic counties of Lanarkshire, Dunbartonshire, Ayrshire, Renfrewshire, Buteshire and the greater part of Argyll; East Lothian, Midlothian and West Lothian are merged to create Lothian; Central is formed from the historic counties of Clackmannanshire, Stirlingshire and part of Perthshire; Tayside from the historic counties of Angus-shire, Kinross-shire and the remainder of Perthshire; Borders from Peeblesshire, Berwickshire, Roxburghshire and Selkirkshire; Dumfries and Galloway from Dumfries-shire, Kirkcudbrightshire and Wigtownshire; Grampian from Aberdeenshire, Banffshire, Morayshire and Kincardineshire; and Highland from Inverness-shire, Nairnshire, Ross and Cromarty, Sutherland and Caithness. Fifeshire alone is left unchanged.
- 27 May – Dibbles Bridge coach crash: a tour coach runs away following brake failure and falls off a bridge near Hebden, North Yorkshire, en route to Grassington, killing the driver and 31 female pensioners on board, the highest ever toll in a UK road accident.
- 28 May – Leeds United are beaten 2–0 by Bayern Munich of West Germany in the European Cup final in Paris, France. Peter Lorimer has a goal for Leeds disallowed and this sparks a riot by angry supporters, who invade the pitch and tear seats away from the stands.
- 31 May – The European Space Agency is established, with the UK being one of the ten founding members.

=== June ===
- 2 June – Snow showers occur across the country even as far south as London which last happened in June in 1761.
- 5 June – 67% of voters support continuing membership of the EEC in a referendum.
- 6 June – Nuneaton rail crash: a sleeper train travelling from London Euston to Glasgow derails, killing six people and injuring 38.
- 9 June – Proceedings in Parliament are broadcast on radio for the first time.
- 11 June – In Uganda, British author and adventurer Denis Hills is sentenced to death by firing squad for referring to Idi Amin as a 'village tyrant' but eventually released.
- 13 June – UEFA places a three-year ban on Leeds United from European competitions due to the behaviour of their fans at last month's European Cup final.
- 14 June – Ambulance crews in the West Midlands stage a ban on non-emergency calls in a dispute over pay and hours.
- 17 June – Leeds United lodge an appeal against their ban from European competitions.
- 19 June – A coroner's court jury returns a verdict of wilful murder, naming Lord Lucan as the murderer, in the inquest on Sandra Rivett, the nanny who was found dead at his wife's London home seven months previously. Lucan has not been seen since soon after the murder.
- 30 June – UEFA reduces Leeds United's ban from European competitions to one season on appeal.

=== July ===
- July – The Government and Trades Union Congress agree to a one-year cash limit on pay rises.
- 5 July – A 36-year-old Keighley woman, Ann Rogulskyj, is badly injured in a hammer attack in an alleyway in the West Yorkshire town; she is the second victim of Peter Sutcliffe.
- 19 July – Hatton Cross tube station is opened, completing the first phase of the extension of London Underground's Piccadilly line to Heathrow Airport.

=== August ===
- 1 August – The Government's anti-inflation policy comes into full effect. During the year, inflation reaches 24.2% - the second-highest recorded level since records began in 1750, and the highest since 1800. A summary of the White Paper Attack on Inflation is delivered to all households.
- 11 August – British Leyland Motor Corporation comes under British government control.
- 14 August – Hampstead enters the UK Weather Records with the Highest 155-min total rainfall at 169mm.
- 15 August
  - The Birmingham Six are wrongfully sentenced to life imprisonment for last year's Birmingham pub bombings. Their convictions are overturned in 1991.
  - A 46-year-old Halifax woman, Olive Smelt, is severely injured in a hammer attack in an alleyway in the town.
- 16 August – Football hooliganism strikes on the opening day of the English league season, with hundreds of fans being arrested at games across the country - the total number of arrests exceeds seventy at the stadiums of Wolverhampton Wanderers and Leicester City.
- 19 August – Headingley Cricket Ground is vandalised by people campaigning for release from prison of the armed robber George Davis. A scheduled test match between England and Australia which was meant to take place there has to be abandoned. This is the climax to a campaign in which the slogan George Davis is Innocent has been widely sprayed throughout London.
- 21 August – The unemployment rate reaches the 1,250,000 mark.
- 27 August – A 14-year-old, Tracy Browne, is badly injured in a hammer attack in a country lane at Silsden, near Keighley.
- 31 August – Cavalcade of steam locomotives from Shildon, County Durham, to Darlington, County Durham, to mark the 150th anniversary of the Stockton and Darlington Railway.

=== September ===
- September – Chrysler UK launches its new Alpine five-door family hatchback, a modern front-wheel drive car to compete with the conventional Ford Cortina, Morris Marina and upcoming Vauxhall Cavalier rear-wheel drive saloons. The new car is also built in France as the Simca 1307.
- 5 September – The London Hilton hotel is bombed by the IRA, killing two people and injuring 63 others.
- 19 September – The first episode of the popular sitcom Fawlty Towers is broadcast on BBC Two.
- 24 September – Dougal Haston and Doug Scott become the first British people to reach the summit of Mount Everest.
- 27 September – The National Railway Museum is opened in York, becoming the first national museum outside London.
- 28 September–3 October – The Spaghetti House siege, in which nine people are taken as hostages by armed robbers, takes place in London.

=== October ===
- October
  - Vauxhall announces its second new model launch of the year - the Cavalier, which replaces the Victor, is based on the German Opel Ascona, and is a direct competitor for the big-selling Ford Cortina.
  - Statistics show that Britain is in a double-dip recession, as the economy contracted for the second and third quarters of the year.
- 9 October – An IRA bomb explosion outside Green Park tube station near Piccadilly in London kills one person and injures twenty other people.
- 13 October – Norton Villiers, the Wolverhampton-based motorcycle producer, closes down with the loss of 1,600 jobs after being declared bankrupt.
- 23 October – Oncologist Gordon Hamilton Fairley is killed in London by an IRA bomb intended for Sir Hugh Fraser.
- 28 October – Dr. No is broadcast on ITV, the first time a Bond film is shown on British television.
- 30 October – West Yorkshire Police launch a murder investigation after 28-year-old prostitute Wilma McCann is found dead in Leeds. She later becomes known as Peter Sutcliffe's first murder victim.
- 31 October – Queen's "Bohemian Rhapsody" is released.

=== November ===
- 3 November – A petroleum pipeline from Cruden Bay to Grangemouth across Scotland is formally opened by HM The Queen.
- 6 November – The first public performance by punk rock band the Sex Pistols takes place.
- 12 November – The Employment Protection Act establishes Acas to arbitrate industrial disputes, extends jurisdiction of employment tribunals, establishes a Maternity Pay Fund to provide for paid maternity leave and legislates against unfair dismissal.
- 15 November – The Prime Minister attends the 1st G6 summit, at the Château de Rambouillet in France.
- 16 November – British and Icelandic ships clash, marking the beginning of the third Cod War.
- 27 November – Ross McWhirter, 50, co-founder with his twin of the Guinness Book of Records, is shot dead outside his London home by the Provisional Irish Republican Army for offering reward money to informers.
- 29 November – Former racing driver Graham Hill, 46, and racing driver Tony Brise, 23, are both killed in an air crash in Hertfordshire.

=== December ===
- December – Donald Neilson, 39, is arrested in Mansfield, Nottinghamshire, on suspicion of being the "Black Panther" murderer who is believed to have carried out five murders in the last two years.
- 5 December – The Government ends Internment of suspected terrorists in Northern Ireland.
- 6–12 December – Balcombe Street Siege: IRA members on the run from police break into a London flat, taking the residents hostage. The siege ends after six days with the gunmen giving themselves up to the police.
- 25 December
  - The heavy metal band Iron Maiden is formed by Steve Harris in London.
  - The Wizard of Oz is shown on British television for the first time, on BBC One.
- 29 December – Two new laws, the Sex Discrimination Act 1975 and the Equal Pay Act 1970, come into force aiming to end unequal pay of men and women in the workplace.

=== Undated ===
- The Willis Building (Ipswich) is completed, a key early example of Foster Associates' 'high-tech' architectural style.
- The British National Oil Corporation is set up.
- First annual payment of Short Money made to the Official Opposition in the House of Commons to help with its costs for Parliamentary business (named after Edward Short, Leader of the House).
- The Fisher Meredith law firm is established in London.
- Jackie Tabick becomes the first female rabbi in the British Isles.
- The white-tailed sea eagle is re-introduced to the UK, on the Isle of Rum.

== Publications ==
- J. G. Ballard’s dystopian novel High-Rise.
- Malcolm Bradbury's campus novel The History Man.
- Agatha Christie's final Hercule Poirot novel Curtain (written c1940).
- Shirley Conran's guide Superwoman.
- Richard Crossman's The Diaries of a Cabinet Minister (posthumous), after a legal battle with the Government which wished to suppress publication.
- Colin Dexter's first Inspector Morse novel Last Bus to Woodstock.
- Ruth Prawer Jhabvala's novel Heat and Dust.
- David Lodge's campus novel Changing Places.
- Paul Scott's novel A Division of the Spoils, the final part of The Raj Quartet.
- Gerald Seymour's thriller Harry's Game.

== Births ==
- 4 January – David Carrick, serial rapist
- 6 January – Jason King, radio and television host
- 8 January – Chris Simmons, actor
- 13 January – Shazia Mirza, comedian
- 20 January – Zac Goldsmith, environmentalist and politician
- 21 January – Nicky Butt, footballer
- 24 January
  - Paul Marazzi, singer
  - Lucy Montgomery, comedian, actress and writer
- 28 January – Lee Latchford-Evans, singer
- 5 February – Alison Hammond, actress and television presenter
- 12 February – Shahzada Dawood, businessman, investor and philanthropist (died 2023)
- 13 February – Katie Hopkins, media personality, businesswoman and political commentator
- 18 February
  - Keith Gillespie, footballer
  - Gary Neville, footballer
- 25 February – Naga Munchetty, television presenter and journalist
- 12 March – Amanda Milling, Chairman of the Conservative Party
- 13 March – Mark Clattenburg, football referee
- 21 March
  - Justin Pierce, British-American actor (died 2000)
  - Mark Williams, snooker player
- 5 April – Caitlin Moran, journalist and broadcaster
- 9 April – Robbie Fowler, footballer
- 13 April – Bruce Dyer, footballer
- 20 April – Olly Robbins, civil servant
- 1 May – Paloma Baeza, actress and director
- 2 May – David Beckham, footballer
- 17 May – Jonti Picking, animator, voice actor and internet personality
- 18 May – John Higgins, snooker player
- 20 May – Graham Potter, football player and manager
- 22 May – Kelly Morgan, badminton player
- 27 May – Jamie Oliver, chef and television personality
- 29 May
  - Melanie Brown, pop singer (Spice Girls)
  - Sarah Millican, comedian
- 4 June
  - Russell Brand, comedian and actor
  - Alex Wharf, English cricketer
- 10 June – Darren Eadie, English footballer and manager
- 14 June – Laurence Rickard, actor, writer and comedian
- 19 June – Ed Coode, rower
- 3 July – Matt Haig, writer
- 13 July – Gareth Edwards, film director
- 15 July – Jill Halfpenny, actress
- 17 July – Konnie Huq, television presenter
- 22 July – Hannah Waterman, actress
- 26 July – Liz Truss, politician
- 30 July – Graham Nicholls, artist
- 31 July – Stephanie Hirst, born Simon Hirst, radio DJ
- 11 August – Asma al-Assad, born Asma Akhras, spouse of Bashar al-Assad
- 22 August – Sheree Murphy, actress
- 31 August – Daniel Harding, orchestral conductor and airline pilot
- 12 September – Ian Riches, cricketer
- 18 September – Ritchie Appleby, football player
- 23 September – Chris Hawkins, radio personality
- 25 September – Declan Donnelly, television presenter and one half of Ant and Dec
- 5 October – Kate Winslet, actress
- 7 October – Tim Minchin, English-born singer-songwriter and comic performer
- 9 October – Joe McFadden, actor
- 16 October – Sally Biddulph, journalist and presenter
- 25 October – Zadie Smith, born Sadie Smith, novelist
- 9 November – Gareth Malone, choirmaster
- 12 November
  - Katherine Grainger, rower
  - Adele Carlsen, synchronised swimmer
- 13 November – Gary Burgess, broadcaster and journalist (died 2022)
- 18 November – Anthony McPartlin, television presenter and one half of Ant and Dec
- 5 December – Ronnie O'Sullivan, snooker player
- 6 December – Noel Clarke, actor and film maker
- 12 December – Jackie Brady, gymnast
- 20 December – Jacqui Oatley, sports presenter
- 23 December – Lorna Norris, rower

== Deaths ==
- 31 January – Bernard Fitzalan-Howard, 16th Duke of Norfolk, peer and Earl Marshal (born 1908)
- 8 February – Robert Robinson, organic chemist, Nobel Prize laureate (born 1886)
- 12 February – Bernard Knowles, film director and screenwriter (born 1900)
- 14 February
  - Julian Huxley, biologist (born 1887)
  - P. G. Wodehouse, comic writer (born 1881)
- 22 February – Lionel Tertis, violist (born 1876)
- 24 February – Una Duval, suffragette (born 1879)
- 26 February – Stephen Tibble, London police officer (shot) (born 1953)
- 28 February – Neville Cardus, writer on cricket and music (born 1888)
- 3 March
  - Sandy MacPherson, theatre organist (born 1897 in Canada)
  - T. H. Parry-Williams, poet (born 1887)
- 27 March – Sir Arthur Bliss, composer and conductor (born 1891)
- 3 April – Mary Ure, actress (born 1933)
- 14 April – Michael Flanders, actor and songwriter (born 1922)
- 23 April – William Hartnell, actor (born 1908)
- 24 April – Pete Ham, musician (born 1947; suicide)
- 20 May – Barbara Hepworth, sculptor (born 1903)
- 21 May – A. H. Dodd, historian (born 1891)
- 3 June – Sir Christopher Bonham-Carter, admiral and Treasurer to the Duke of Edinburgh (1959–1970) (born 1907)
- 5 June – Lester Matthews, actor (born 1900)
- 9 June – Albert Spencer, 7th Earl Spencer, aristocrat (born 1892)
- 27 June – Arthur Salter, 1st Baron Salter, politician and academic (born 1881)
- 28 June – William Ibbett, submariner and radio broadcaster (born 1886)
- 2 July – James Robertson Justice, actor (born 1907)
- 7 August – Jim Griffiths, politician (born 1890)
- 10 September – George Paget Thomson, physicist, Nobel Prize laureate (born 1892)
- 22 October – Arnold J. Toynbee, historian (born 1889)
- 23 October – Gordon Hamilton Fairley, oncologist (murdered) (born 1930 in Australia)
- 27 October – Frederick Charles Victor Laws, Royal Air Force officer, pioneer of aerial reconnaissance (born 1887)
- 25 November
  - Edward Hyams, author, historian and gardener (born 1910)
  - Moyna Macgill, actress (born 1895)
- 27 November – Ross McWhirter, co-founder of the Guinness Book of Records (assassinated) (born 1925)
- 29 November
  - Tony Brise, racing driver, plane crash (born 1952)
  - Graham Hill, racing driver, plane crash (born 1929)
- 18 December – R. Ifor Parry, minister, teacher and philanthropist, 67

== See also ==
- List of British films of 1975
