= Tarbuck and All That! =

1975 British television series

Tarbuck and All That! is a British television series aired in 1975. It was produced by Associated Television and starred Jimmy Tarbuck. All five episodes are believed to have been destroyed.
