= Horror Double Bills =

Horror movie broadcasts

The BBC2 Horror Double Bills were seasons of classic horror movies broadcast annually in the UK on BBC2 television between 1975 and 1983, with a revival in 1993. They provided rare opportunities (in a pre-VHS or DVD era) to see some of these films.

== Format and content ==
Each Saturday night during the summer (usually July and August), two horror, science-fiction or fantasy movies would be shown, the majority of which were from Universal and Hammer studios, though lesser known movies were also featured. The first season was broadcast in 1975, under the title "Midnight Movie Fantastic", though the season title would vary throughout the years ("Horror Double Bill," "Monster Double Bill," "Dracula, Frankenstein & Friends"). The third season in 1977 ("Dracula, Frankenstein & Friends"), featured the best known Universal monster titles (paired with each other or a Hammer/AIP title), whilst the final original season in 1981 consisted of titles from Val Lewton's horror cycle made for RKO paired with more obscure modern titles.

After seven years, there was no season in 1982. A final series of Double Bills was broadcast during the summer of 1983, although this season was entirely made up of the classic Universal horrors from the 1930s and 1940s, all of which had been shown before, predominantly in the 1977 season "Dracula, Frankenstein & Friends."

== The 1990s ==
After 1983, the BBC rested the format. However the Double Bills returned in 1993 following the success of an all-night Halloween horror marathon on BBC2 a year earlier. The marathon was introduced and linked by Dr. Walpurgis, played by Guy Henry and created by Kim Newman. The other event of that evening was the broadcast of Ghostwatch on BBC1 starring Michael Parkinson, Mike Smith & Sarah Greene. During this evening, it was intended that Dr. Walpurgis would have the privilege of introducing for the first time on British TV the uncut version of Curse of the Werewolf (Hammer 1960), which the doctor described as having "extra stalk and slash scenes." However, problems led to the showing of the usual cut version of the film. The uncut version aired a few months later.

Dr. Terror's Vault of Horror was broadcast on Fridays on BBC1 between September and December 1993 and featured Guy Henry's character, though he was renamed Dr. Terror. The Double Bills only ran one year, although Dr. Terror would return to introduce individual horrors in 1994 and 1996.

== List of films broadcast in the Double Bill ==
=== 1975 Midnight Movie Fantastic ===
Date	Time	Title	Detail
Saturday, 2 August 1975	22.55 - 00.05	The Cabinet of Dr. Caligari	Decla Productions (1919)
	00.05 - 01.20	Quatermass 2	Hammer (1957)
Saturday, 9 August 1975	22.45 - 00.00	The Tell Tale Heart	Danziger (1960)
	00.00 - 01.20	The Premature Burial	AIP (1961)
Saturday, 16 August 1975	23.15 – 00.20	Noah's Ark	(1928)
	00.20 – 01.20	Man and His Mate	(1940)
Saturday, 23 August 1975	22.40 - 00.05	This Island Earth	Universal (1955)
	00.05 - 01.25	Barbarella	Dino de Laurentis/Marianne Productions (1968)
Saturday, 30 August 1975	22.55 - 00.05	The Cat and The Canary	Paramount (1939)
	00.05 - 01.25	The Comedy of Terrors	AlP (1963)
Saturday, 6 September 1975	22.35 - 00.00	The Beast With Five Fingers	Warner Brothers (1947)
	00.00 - 01.20	The Maze	Allied Artists (1954)

=== 1976 Masters of Terror ===
Date	Time	Title	Detail
Saturday, 14 August 1976	22.55 - 00.10	The Phantom of the Opera	Universal 1925
	00.10 - 01.40	Dr. Jekyll and Mr. Hyde	Paramount 1932
Saturday, 21 August 1976	22.00 - 23.20	Devil Doll	MGM 1932
	23.20 - 00.50	Frankenstein Created Woman	Hammer 1967
Saturday, 28 August 1976	11.00 - 00.05	The Hounds of Zaroff	RKO 1932
	00.05 - 01.25	Hound of the Baskervilles	Twentieth Century Fox 1939
Saturday, 5 September 1976	22.55 - 00.10	The Mad Genius	Warner 1931
	00.10 - 01.30	The Pit and The Pendulum	AlP 1961
Saturday, 14 September 1976	22.50 - 23.55	The Walking Dead	Warner 1936
	23.55 - 01.20	Dracula Prince of Darkness	Hammer 1966

=== 1977 Dracula, Frankenstein and Friends ===
Date	Time	Title	Detail
Saturday, 2 July 1977	23.05 - 00.25	Dracula	Universal 1931
	00.25 - 01.35	Frankenstein	Universal 1931
Saturday, 9 July 1977	22.50 - 00.00	Bride of Frankenstein	Universal 1935
	00.00 - 01.25	Brides of Dracula	Hammer 1960
Saturday, 16 July 1977	22.45 - 11.55	The Mummy	Universal 1932
	00.15 - 01.05	The Wolf Man	Universal 1940
Saturday, 23 July 1977	22.10 - 23.45	Son of Frankenstein	Universal 1938
	23.45 - 01.10	Kiss of the Vampire	Hammer 1964
Saturday, 30 July 1977	22.35 - 00.05	Dracula's Daughter	Universal 1936
	00.05 - 01.30	Plague of the Zombies	Hammer 1966
Saturday, 6 August 1977	22.50 - 23.55	The Ghost of Frankenstein	Universal 1942
	22.55 - 01.10	The Premature Burial	AlP 1961
Saturday, 13 August 1977	23.05 - 00.05	The Raven	Universal 1935
	00.05 - 01.10	The Black Cat	Universal 1934
Saturday, 20 August 1977	22.00 - 23.15	Frankenstein Meets The Wolfman	Universal 1943
	00.05 - 01.35	The Raven	AlP 1963
Saturday, 27 August 1977	22.20 - 23.10	House of Frankenstein	Universal 1944
	00.05 - 01.35	The Reptile	Hammer 1966
Saturday, 3 September 1977	21.55 - 23-10	Son of Dracula	Universal 1943
	23.45 - 01.10	Evil of Frankenstein	Hammer 1964
Saturday, 10 September 1977	22.05 - 23.15	House of Dracula	Universal 1945
	23.20 - 00.35	Fall of the House of Usher	AlP 1960

=== 1978 Monster Double Bill ===
Date	Time	Title	Detail
Saturday, 8 July 1978	22.55 - 23.55	Murders in the Rue Morgue	Universal 1933
	23.55 - 01.25	The Man Who Could Cheat Death	Hammer 1959
Saturday, 15 July 1978	22.40 - 23.55	The Fantastic Disappearing Man	Gramercy Pictures 1958
	00.00 - 01.15	X: The Man with the X-ray Eyes	AlP 1963
Saturday, 22 July 1978	22.00 - 23.20	The Quatermass Xperiment	Hammer 1955
	23.50 - 01.35	The Crazies	Cambist 1973
Saturday, 29 July 1978	23.15 - 00.15	Man Made Monster	Universal 1940
	00.15 - 01.15	The Mummy's Curse	Universal 1945
Saturday, 5 August 1978	22.40 - 23.55	White Zombie	Halperin 1932
	00.00 - 01.25	House of Wax	Warner 1953
Saturday, 12 August 1978	21.40 - 23.10	Them!	Universal 1954
	23.45 - 01.05	The Incredible Shrinking Man	Universal 1957
Saturday, 19 August 1978	22.00 - 23.15	Voodoo Island	Bel Air 1957
	23.20 - 00.45	Phantom of the Rue Morgue	Warner 1953
Saturday, 26 August 1978	22.00 - 23.35	King Kong	RKO 1933
	23.40 - 01.10	Superbeast	A & S Productions 1972

=== 1979 Masters of Terror ===
Date	Time	Title	Detail
Saturday, 14 July 1979	22.35-23.50	Doctor X	Warner 1932
	23.55-01.20	The Curse of Frankenstein	Hammer 1956
Saturday, 21 July 1979	22.30-23.30	Sherlock Holmes and the Spider Woman	20th Century Fox 1944
	00.00-01.30	The Hound of the Baskervilles	Hammer 1959
Saturday, 28 July 1979	22.15-23.25	Night Monster	Universal 1942
	23.30.01.10	The Devil Rides Out	Hammer 1968
Saturday, 4 August 1979	23.00.00.05	Black Friday	Universal 1940
	00.05.01.35	The Mummy	Hammer 1959
Saturday, 11 August 1979	22.05.23.25	The Strange Door	Universal 1951
	23.25-01.00	Blood from the Mummy's Tomb	Hammer 1971
Saturday, 18 August 1979	22.35-23.40	The Mummy's Hand	Universal 1944
	00.10-01.35	The Satanic Rites of Dracula	Hammer 1973
Saturday, 25 August 1979	22.00-23.20	It Came From Outer Space	Universal 1951
	23.25-01.05	Quatermass and the Pit (film)	Hammer 1967

=== 1980 Horror Double Bill ===
Date	Time	Title	Detail
Saturday, 28 June 1980	22.30.00.00	Night of the Demon	Sabre 1957
	00.02-01.35	The Ghoul	Tyburn 1975
Saturday, 5 July 1980	10.10-11.35	The Beast with Five Fingers	Warner 1947
	23.50-01.30	Chamber of Horrors	Warner 1966
Saturday, 12 July 1980	22.40-23.45	The Mad Ghoul	Universal 1943
	23.50-01.30	Dr. Terror's House of Horrors	Amicus 1964
Saturday, 19 July 1980	22.35-23.50	The Devil-Doll	MGM 1936
	23.55-01.25	Daughters of Satan	UA 1972
Saturday, 26 July 1980	22.10-23.40	Curse of the Werewolf	Hammer 1960
	23.55-01.35	From Beyond the Grave	Amicus 1974
Saturday, 2 August 1980	22.35-23.50	Paranoiac	Hammer 1963
	12.00-01.35	Captain Kronos – Vampire Hunter	Hammer 1973
Saturday, 9 August 1980	22.35-23.55	The Beast from 20,000 Fathoms	Warner 1953
	00.00-01.20	Night of the Lepus	MGM/A.C. Lyles 1972
Saturday, 16 August 1980	22.20-23.40	The Bat	UA 1959
	23.45-01.20	Legend of the Werewolf	Tyburn 1974
Saturday, 23 August 1980	22.40.00.00	Tower of London	Universal 1939
	00.00-01.20	The Skull	Amicus 1965
Saturday, 30 August 1980	00.00-01.35	The Beast Must Die	Amicus 1974

=== 1981 Horror Double Bill ===
Date	Time	Title	Detail
Saturday, 4 July 1981	22.35-23.10	I Walked with a Zombie	RKO 1943
	00.10.01.10	Zoltan, Hound of Dracula	Crown International 1978
Saturday, 11 July 1981	23.05-00.15	Cat People	RKO 1942
	00.15-01.35	Mystery of the Wax Museum	Warner 1933
Saturday, 18 July 1981	22.55-00.05	The Seventh Victim	RKO 1943
	00.05-01.35	Race With The Devil	Saber 1970
Saturday, 25 July 1981	21.20-22.30	Isle of the Dead	RKO 1940
	23.40-01.25	The Crazies	Cambist 1973
Saturday, 1 August 1981	22.30-23.45	Bedlam	RKO 1946
	23.45-01.30	Bug	Paramount 1975
Saturday, 8 August 1981	22.50-23.55	The Leopard Man	RKO 1943
	23.55-01.35	The Shuttered Room	Warner 1966
Saturday, 15 August 1981	22.35-23.40	The Curse of the Cat People	RKO 1943
	23.40-01.10	Eye of the Cat	Universal 1969
Saturday, 22 August 1981	22.30-23.40	The Body Snatcher	RKO 1945
	23.40-01.25	Theatre of Blood	Harbor Productions/Cineman 1973

=== 1983 Horror Double Bill ===
Date	Time	Title	Detail
Saturday, 9 July 1983	10.00-11.10	Dracula	Universal 1931
	11.15-12.30	Frankenstein	Universal 1931
Saturday, 16 July 1983	11.45- 01.05	The Bride of Frankenstein	Universal 1935
Saturday, 23 July 1983	10.05-11.15	Dracula's Daughter	Universal 1936
	11.20-01.35	Son Of Frankenstein	Universal 1939
Saturday, 30 July 1983	10.35-11.45	The Mummy	Universal 1932
	11.45-01.00	Ghost of Frankenstein	Universal 1942
Saturday, 6 August 1983	10.40-11.50	The Wolfman	Universal 1941
	11.55-01.10	Frankenstein Meets the Wolfman	Universal 1943
Saturday, 13 August 1983	10.15-11.35	Son of Dracula	Universal 1943
	11.40-12.55	House of Frankenstein	Universal 1944
Saturday, 20 August 1983	10.05-11.10	The Mummy's Hand	Universal 1940
	11.15-12.25	House of Dracula	Universal 1945
Saturday, 3 September 1983 (titled Horror Triple Bill)	9.45-10.50	The Black Cat	Universal 1934
	11.30-12.30	Murders In The Rue Morgue	Universal 1932
	12.30-01.35	The Raven	Universal 1935

== 1992 BBC2 All-Night Halloween Marathon ==
=== The Vault of Horror ===
An all-night festival of terror for Hallowe'en, hosted by Dr. Walpurgis (subsequently renamed Dr. Terror). The producers were Mark Deitch and Nick Freand Jones.

Saturday, 31 October 1992

Time	Title	Detail
11.00 - 11.20	Introduction by Dr. Walpurgis / What's behind the Door, Mummy?	Leading figures in horror discuss what it is that scares people.
11.20 - 11.25	Tales from EC	A look at the 1950s horror comic
11.25 - 01.25	Creepshow	Laurel Entertainment 1982
01.25 - 01.30	The Art of Illusion	With special effects and make up artist Tom Savini
01.30 - 01.40	The Unholy Trinity	A discussion on horror's leading men – Freddie, Jason & Pinhead
01.40 - 03.10	The Curse of the Werewolf	Hammer 1961
03.10 - 03.15	Prime Evil	Sam Raimi & Bruce Campbell talk about The Evil Dead
03.15 - 03.20	Terror on the Page	Stephen King and other authors open their books.
03.20 - 04.30	The Bride of Frankenstein	Universal 1935
04.30 - 04.35	The Horror of Sex	Women's role in horror
04.35 - 04.45	Dario's Friends	Dario Argento at work on his new film Trauma
04.45 - 06.10	Death Line	Harbor Ventures/K-L Productions 1972
06.10 - 07.25	Abbott and Costello Meet Frankenstein	Universal 1948
07.25 - 07.30	Close by Dr. Walpurgis	

== Dr. Terror's Vault of Horror, Series 1993-1996 ==
=== 1993 Dr. Terror's Vault of Horror ===
Date	Time	Title	Detail
Friday, 10 September 1993	11.15-12.50	Vamp	Balcor Film Investors/Planet Productions 1986
	12.50-02.20	The Mask of Satan	Alta Vista/Galatea Film/Jolly Film 1960
Friday, 17 September 1993	11.25-12.55	The Guardian	Universal/Nanny Productions 1990
	12.55-02.10	From Hell It Came	Allied Artists 1957
Friday, 24 September 1993	11.30-12.55	The Curse of Frankenstein	Hammer 1956
	12.55-02.05	Blood of Dracula	AIP/Carmel 1957
Friday, 1 October 1993	11.05-12.30	Horror Express	Benmar/Granada 1972
	12.30-01.50	The Comedy of Terrors	AIP 1963
Friday, 8 October 1993	11.00-12.25	Crucible of Terror	Glendale 1971
	12.25-02.05	The Beast With Five Fingers	Warner 1946
Friday, 15 October 1993	11.15-12.40	Twins of Evil	Hammer 1971
	12.40-01.55	Terror from the Year 5000	La Jolla Productions 1958
Friday, 22 October 1993	11.50-01.20	Blood of the Vampire	Artistes Alliance Ltd 1958
	01.20-02.50	I Don't Want to Be Born	Rank 1975
Friday, 29 October 1993	11.30-12.45	The Gate	New Century Entertainment/Vista/Alliance 1987
	12.45-02.00	I Was a Teenage Frankenstein	Santa Rosa 1957
Friday, 5 November 1993	11.10-12.40	The Haunted House of Horror	Tigon 1969
	12.40-01.55	House on Haunted Hill	William Castle Productions 1959
Friday, 12 November 1993	11.15-12.45	The Lost Boys	
	12.45-02.05	I Was a Teenage Werewolf	
Friday, 19 November 1993	11.40-01.05	April Fool's Day	Paramount/Hometown Films 1986
	01.05-02.35	Cat's Eye	Dino De Laurentiis/Famous Films 1985
Friday, 3 December 1993	11.05-12.35	Countess Dracula	Hammer 1971
	12.35-01.55	Voodoo Woman	AIP 1957

=== 1994 Dr. Terror's Vault of Horror ===
Date	Title	Detail
Friday, 9 September	The Fog	AVCO Embassy 1980
Friday, 16 September	The Ghoul	Tyburn 1974
Friday, 23 September	The Unnameable Returns	Unnamable Productions/Yankee Classic 1992
Friday, 30 September	Taste the Blood of Dracula	Hammer 1970
Friday, 7 October	A Study in Terror	Compton Films 1965
Friday, 14 October	Legend of the Werewolf	Tyburn 1975
Friday, 28 October	Body Parts	Vista Street Entertainment 1991
Friday, 4 November	Curse of the Crimson Altar	Tigon 1968
Friday, 11 November	The Mummy	Hammer 1959
Friday, 18 November	The Legacy	David Foster Prods/Pethurst Ltd/Turman-Foster 1978
Friday, 2 December	Dr Terror's House of Horrors	Amicus 1964
Friday, 9 December	Alligator	Alligator Inc 1980
Friday, 16 December	The Serpent and the Rainbow	Universal 1988

=== 1996 Dr. Terror Presents... ===
Date	Title	Details
Friday, 27 September	The House of Seven Corpses	Television Corporation of America 1974
Friday, 4 October	The Asphyx	Glendale 1973
Friday, 11 October	Devils of Darkness	Planet 1965
Friday, 18 October	The Beast in the Cellar	Tigon 1968
Friday, 25 October	A Child For Satan	1991
Friday, 1 November	Ghost Story	Universal 1981
Friday, 8 November	Dr. Giggles	Dark Horse/JVC/ Largo 1992
Friday, 15 November	Phantasm	New Breed Productions 1978
Friday, 29 November	Nothing But The Night	Charlemagne 1972
Friday, 14 December	The People Under the Stairs	Alive Films/Universal 1991
