= Fisher Meredith =

London law firm

Fisher Meredith LLP
- Headquarters: Holborn, London, UK
- Major practice areas: General practice
- Date founded: 1975
- Dissolved: 14 August 2007 (merger with Bishop & Sewell)
- Website: www.fishermeredith.com

Fisher Meredith LLP was a law firm with offices in Holborn, London, United Kingdom that started in 1975.

Fisher Meredith was consistently ranked in industry directories Chambers and Partners and Legal 500 for a number of areas, notably Civil Liberties and Human Rights, Education, Community Care, Social Housing, Family/Matrimonial, and Police Law.

== Merger ==
Fisher Meredith merged with the firm Bishop & Sewell on 14 August 2017. The combined practice now operates as Bishop & Sewell LLP.
