= List of Secret Army episodes =

This is a complete episode list for the BBC television series Secret Army, which ran for three series from 7 September 1977 until 15 December 1979.

The series follows the members of a Belgian secret group 'Lifeline', dedicated to enabling Allied airmen to escape to Britain, usually after they had been shot down by the Luftwaffe. Following the timeline of the Second World War, the series shows its impact on the people of Belgium, but also features the attempts of the German Nazi occupiers of Belgium to capture the airmen and to expose and exact retribution on those helping them.

43 episodes of Secret Army were produced; however, the final episode "What Did You Do In The War, Daddy?" has never been broadcast.

== Episodes ==
=== Overview ===
Season	Episodes	Originally released		Region 2 DVD release
Season	Episodes	First released	Last released	Region 2 DVD release
1	16	1977	1977	3 November 2003
2	13	1978	1978	5 April 2004
3	13 (plus 1 unaired)	1979	1979	4 October 2004

A boxed set of all three series was released on 8 November 2004.

=== Series One: 1977 ===
Series One was transmitted in 1977 and featured sixteen episodes. It begins in 1941 or 1942, when the Café Candide owner Albert Foiret and his mistress Monique Duchamps help Lisa Colbert (codenamed "Yvette") hide airmen and run the 'Lifeline' organisation. The principal Germans in this series are Sturmbannführer Ludwig Kessler and Luftwaffe Major Erwin Brandt. A British agent, Flight Lieutenant John Curtis is Lifeline's liaison with London.

No. overall	No. in series	Title	Directed by	Written by	Original release date
1	1	"Lisa – Code Name Yvette"	Kenneth Ives	Willis Hall	7 September 1977
Lifeline is threatened when Major Brandt succeeds in identifying a safehouse, and nearly captures Natalie. Lisa and Albert are suspicious when London sends Flight Lieutenant Curtis, a former evader, to help. Some of the people who Curtis knew previously have by now been killed or sent to a labour camp. Brandt has to deal with Gestapo Sturmbannführer Kessler, freshly transferred from Berlin to re-enforce the investigation into the evasion lines. Kessler sends the family who owned the safehouse to a labour camp in Germany.
2	2	"Sergeant on the Run"	Viktors Ritelis	John Brason	14 September 1977
While Albert and Lisa continue to worry about Curtis, Lifeline is tested attempting to help some more evaders. The Germans capture one of them, Sergeant Walker, who has previous knowledge of Lifeline. He makes a desperate bid for freedom to avoid talking, by throwing himself down a staircase at Gestapo HQ. Walker recovers in hospital in the company of an undercover German officer. Prompted by the doctor, he escapes from the surgery, and is hunted by both the Germans and Lifeline. He is found and killed by Albert, to avoid him talking and because he is too infirm for the escape line.
3	3	"Radishes With Butter"	Paul Annett	John Brason	21 September 1977
Jews from Brussels are being transported according to colour-coded identification documents. Curtis befriends a Jewish family living in hiding and privation, and tries to involve Lisa. She however fears that the line, intended for RAF airman, may be compromised by involvement in another area of resistance. Albert continues to distrust Curtis, who brought forged Belgian banknotes from London. Kessler obtains some of these, and realises they have been made using Belgian treasury plates, which were evacuated to London before invasion. Whilst he thinks this will help trace the escape line, bank manager Gaston Colbert (Lisa’s uncle) floods Belgium with the forgeries to disguise their original source. The Jewish family are presumed to have been captured after the colour of the identification cards intended for deportees is changed.
4	4	"Child's Play"	Paul Annett	Arden Winch	28 September 1977
A suppressed magazine article by an American airman who was helped by the evasion line has been found by German agents working in the USA and has reached Brandt. He thinks this probably contains useful intelligence, and visits the Pyrenees. With the help of Malaud, a French gendarme, they identify potential escape routes. Meanwhile Lisa is also in the same area, and comes close to being detected.
5	5	"Second Chance"	Paul Annett	James Andrew Hall	5 October 1977
Lifeline is placed in jeopardy when Albert decides that a customer at the Candide is a Gestapo spy, whilst Lisa continues to dislike Curtis’s controlling attitude. Finch, a downed airman, is hidden by Van Broecken, a Dutch bargee, and his wife Lena. Finch intends to desert and sit out the rest of the war in Switzerland, and discovers that Hans, who is in reality German, went AWOL in World War I. Whilst he wishes to help Finch, Lifeline becomes aware when Lena is reunited with Natalie, her niece. The customer at the Candide is found to be employed by the Gestapo. Finch's plans conflict with Lifeline’s philosophy, and so Finch is betrayed by Albert in order to end the surveillance.
6	6	"Growing Up"	Kenneth Ives	Willis Hall	12 October 1977
A wounded airman Sergeant Howson was stranded by an unwilling colleague, and hides in a barn. Because Germans are in the area searching for airmen, Lisa and Albert are unable to help. Howson gets to know a boy, Jean-Paul Dornes, but needs medical attention. The boy's mother Anna is a lone parent following the death of her husband in the war, and is now close to German Corporal Emil Schnorr. Unfortunately Howson has given the boy a small gift, which reveals his presence and leads to tragic consequences, as the woman then has to be killed in a road accident as a security measure.
7	7	"Lost Sheep"	Paul Annett	N. J. Crisp	19 October 1977
Flight Lieutenant Peter Romsey is an RAF navigator, involved with developing the Oboe navigation system; London urgently requires his safe return. Romsey is accompanied by Natalie down the line with other serviceman, but is parted from them and catches the wrong train. He is lost in rural France, and Lifeline tries to track him down. Romsey finds the house of Hugh Neville and his wife Dorothy; Neville is an expatriate English author with a pessimistic attitude to the war. He is a friend of the local police inspector, who organises a search of the novelist's home. Romsey is hidden in a motorcycle sidecar by Victor, who is the Neville's handyman and the local Lifeline contact, but they are betrayed. Victor is killed and Romsey captured.
8	8	"Guilt"	Paul Annett	N. J. Crisp	26 October 1977
In the aftermath of events in France, a German newspaper publishes British operational secrets. Curtis concludes that the traitor must be located, and goes to France to retrace Romsey’s travels. Meanwhile Albert remains distrustful of him. Monique tails him to France in order to ascertain whether Curtis is genuine. Curtis comes to believe Hugh Neville is responsible for Victor's death and Romsey's capture. Posing as a downed airman, he visits the Neville's home and fatally stabs Hugh Neville.
9	9	"Too Near Home"	Viktors Ritelis	Robert Barr	2 November 1977
A resistance contact near Paris is killed by the Germans whilst Lisa is visiting. She is arrested, but claims she was simply attempting to hire a bicycle from him. Her uncle is held and questioned by Kessler, and Lifeline's survival is now at risk. In custody other prisoners suspect Lisa's true identity, and she decides to trust them in order escape before her true identity is uncovered. She escapes but Gaston is not so fortunate and dies when he attempts to escape (or more likely tries in order to be shot rather than tortured).
10	10	"Identity in Doubt"	Viktors Ritelis	Simon Masters	9 November 1977
Lifeline is under pressure. Jacques and Natalie have to evaluate South African airman Noel Uys, and conclude he must be killed after finding flaws in his story. Uys threatens Natalie with a shotgun and she becomes his prisoner in a windmill. Meanwhile another surviving member of his aircrew persuades Lifeline that Uys is genuine, but the new information may have come too late.
11	11	"A Question of Loyalty"	Kenneth Ives	Willis Hall	23 November 1977
The crew of a British Wellington bomber are all believed killed near Brussels, providing Kessler with a chance to penetrate the escape line. German officer Ernst Stoller, who was raised in England, is chosen to go undercover as an escaping airman. At the same time Monique is frustrated by the situation with Albert and his wife, and romantically drawn to Stoller. With the help of London Stoller's story is found to be flawed, and Monique is forced to help Albert kill the man before he can betray their operation.
12	12	"Hymn to Freedom"	Kenneth Ives	Michael Chapman	30 November 1977
A Lifeline safehouse is discovered. Van Reijn, a Belgian minister in the puppet regime, wants to defect to England and communicates with Curtis. Curtis realises it would be a propaganda coup if Van Reijn reaches Britain, although Lisa is initially unconvinced. Lifeline has been penetrated by another German agent, who is discovered and shot. Whilst dealing with this distraction, Lifeline is unable to save Van Reijn, who is terminally ill and returned to office by the Germans and kept under constant surveillance.
13	13	"Bait"	Viktors Ritelis	James Andrew Hall	7 December 1977
The population of Brussels is compelled to celebrate the Fuhrer's birthday, and Café Candide is obliged to hang a Nazi flag outside. An airman finds refuge with Catherine Bidout, an elderly Englishwoman whom the Germans have not interned in the hope she would lead them to the resistance. Gossip concerning her situation reaches Albert, and he investigates. Madame Bidout is frightened and seeks help from Brandt - who was a childhood a friend of her late son. However it transpires that the hidden man is really another German plant. Brandt is forced to persuade the woman to seek help from the resistance, and a photograph of Brandt with her son risks his exposure for helping the enemy.
14	14	"Good Friday"	Paul Annett	John Brason	14 December 1977
Just before Easter, a Dominican Friar Father Girard is hearing Andree’s confession at the Candide. Already known to Lifeline, he inadvertently overhears them talking about their hidden airman. Girard offers to hide him at the Priory during the holiday. The Prior Father Pierre is willing to help, but Brother Anselm thinks Friars should stay out of the war. He contacts the Gestapo, which leads to several members of the order including Girard being killed by the Germans.
15	15	"Suspicions"	Kenneth Ives	N. J. Crisp	21 December 1977
Kessler and Brandt are investigating the Neville murder and Curtis, whose cover is as a salesman for a Belgian fertiliser company, becomes their subject. Considering Curtis to be involved in subversive activity, Brandt and Kessler question him at the Candide and take him away for interrogation. The situation for Lifeline beings to look desperate.
16	16	"Be the First Kid in Your Block to Rule the World"	Viktors Ritelis	John Brason	29 December 1977
Curtis is finally uncovered and Kessler is now aware of his resistance work. Curtis hides out in Brussels and breaks contact with Lifeline for its safety. Kessler arranges a security sweep throughout Brussels and stops all movement out of the city while every house is searched. In desperation Curtis returns to the Candide to seek help, and Monique devises an audacious but successful escape plan; Curtis poses as a bus driver on a Hitler Youth daytrip, which Kessler has personally authorised. Meanwhile Andree has a fatal accident during the house search.

=== Series Two: 1978 ===
Series Two was broadcast in 1978 with various changes in the cast, including the death of Lisa in the first episode and the inclusion of pianist Max Brocard (Stephen Yardley). With financial support from London, Albert opened the larger Restaurant Candide, which was centrally located on the Grand-Place.

No. overall	No. in series	Title	Directed by	Written by	Original release date
17	1	"The Hostage"	Terence Dudley	N. J. Crisp	27 September 1978
The staff are preparing to open the new Restaurant Candide, part-funded by the British, on La Grand-Place in Brussels. A new forger Max Brocard is found for Lifeline. London requires safe passage for a Brigadier General with top secret knowledge of a forthcoming push in North Africa (Operation Torch), whose plane was downed en route to Africa. The Brigadier is located by Natalie and she prepares to take him down an escape route. Meanwhile a German soldier has been murdered in Brussels, and Kessler holds twenty people hostage and shoots one each day until the killer is found. One of these hostages is the Brigadier. Albert and Dr Keldermans arrange for a dead body to be handed over to the Germans, via the Belgian police, as the supposed killer, after which the hostages are released and the Brigadier returned to Britain along the escape line. The episode closes with Lisa Colbert having been killed in an air raid while visiting St Nazaire.
18	2	"Russian Roulette"	Paul Annett	John Brason	4 October 1978
Dr Keldermans brings news to La Candide that Lisa is dead. Albert becomes the new head of Lifeline. Natalie has responsibility for guiding two Russian evaders. At La Candide, Brandt meets a senior military contact, Oberst von Elmendorff, who tries to interest him in a conspiracy to eliminate Hitler. Meanwhile Albert accepts an invitation from Kessler to a garden fête, where he sees several Belgians shot by firing squad as a ploy to keep collaborators loyal to Kessler. The Russians eventually reach the UK but are handed back to the Soviet Union, where they are likely to be shot by their own government, as was common for Soviet soldiers who had been captured by the Germans.
19	3	"Lucky Piece"	Viktors Ritelis	Robert Barr	11 October 1978
During extreme weather several British bombers crash, including a plane carrying a Polish forced worker back to London with information about German research into special weapons, accompanied by Major Nicholas Bradley, a British officer later revealed to be with the special services. They make contact with Lifeline and Bradley manages to tail Natalie back to the Candide without her realising. Bradley’s fears about lax security are well grounded since a Gestapo agent is already watching her. Natalie assists Bradley in killing him. Using wireless intercepts and ground observers, the Germans correctly guess the pickup time and location, but get there moments too late to prevent the injured Polish worker from returning to the UK by Lysander.
20	4	"Trapped"	Terrence Dudley	N. J. Crisp	18 October 1978
At La Candide Kessler becomes aware of Madeleine Duclos, a withdrawn former lover of a Belgian Baron. Meanwhile Monique is accompanying several evaders but is injured by accident at a railway station, when an unconnected diamond smuggler is shot boarding the train. Monique is investigated while at a convent hospital and is found innocent of any involvement in smuggling, but the French gendarmes discover that she was carrying multiple train tickets for the evaders. Kessler travels from Brussels to question her, but she is rescued from hospital just in time by Natalie, Alain and Max, posing as a nurse and ambulance men.
21	5	"Not According to Plan"	Viktors Ritelis	David Crane	25 October 1978
Natalie's new boyfriend, François, wants to help Lifeline, but Albert is difficult to persuade. Meanwhile the leader of a clandestine Brussels Communist group, Paul Vercors, plans to take over the organisation. It transpires that Max is their plant within Lifeline, but he is wary of acting too soon. The Communists derail a train with explosives, on which Natalie, François and several airmen are travelling. The Germans threaten to shoot twenty communist hostages, and so Vercors tells the Germans what he knows about Lifeline in order to get them released. The people he betrays are not central to the organisation, but Kessler and Brandt decide to tell Berlin they have made significant arrests.
22	6	"Scorpion"	Roger Jenkins	James Andrew Hall	1 November 1978
Brandt's wife Erika visits him in Brussels. She is frightened of the British air raids on Berlin. Brandt tells her that his work in Brussels against the escape line will soon be done, as Lifeline has been penetrated by a German agent. His cleaner overhears this and tells Albert. Lifeline considers eliminating all nineteen hidden airmen for security. However, Max and Dr Keldermans propose that Natalie’s uncle Hans Van Broecken (who was a German First World War deserter) might be able to identify the man. Despite disliking Albert he is persuaded to help. Eventually they trick the German into revealing himself because of his fighting skills, and he is killed, against Hans's wishes.
23	7	"Weekend"	Paul Annett	Paul Annett	8 November 1978
Lifeline is challenged by money problems. Albert and Monique devise a solution through the sale of three Rubens masterpieces, which are in a nearby convent, and substituting copies for them. However, at the same time the German occupiers are seeking to get hold of them. Kessler travels to the convent and obtains the paintings. By chance two American airmen happen to stop Kessler's car. They take Kessler and his companion hostage, remaining unaware of his identity, and force themselves onto Hans and Lena Van Broecken on their barge, so that they can escape However, Lena persuades them to allow her to contact Lifeline, and they are passed down the line. Lifeline realises that if Kessler is killed, it could lead to terrible reprisals. Kessler escapes unharmed, but takes the Van Broeckens in for questioning. Lena throws herself in front of a passing vehicle to avoid questioning, and is killed.
24	8	"The Big One"	Michael E. Briant	N. J. Crisp	15 November 1978
Kessler and Madeleine are becoming closer, though he continues to fear emotional attachment. Meanwhile Brandt is still trying to decide whether to join the conspiracy to kill Hitler. The night before he returns home a British air raid hits the Berlin suburb where they live; his mother and daughter survive, but his wife and son are killed. Monique and Alain speak to a bomber crew member who has been shot down, but frighten him and he falls into German hands. Brandt holds the man, and obtains some information about his contacts with Lifeline before losing his composure and attacking the prisoner.
25	9	"Little Old Lady"	Terence Dudley	David Crane	22 November 1978
A British Wing Commander suffers severe facial burns when his plane is shot down by anti-aircraft fire over Belgium. The British want him returned, but his face risks being noticed by the Germans. Some makeup is enough for him to reach Paris accompanied by Natalie, but Monique believes he should pose as a woman if he is not to be discovered during the rest of the journey. He successfully travels down the escape line to Spain. In Brussels, Madeleine faces isolation because of her affair with Kessler, although she finds Monique a surprisingly good listener. The Candide is threatened by terrorists for their supposed collaboration, and the Gestapo briefly take Albert into custody.
26	10	"Guests at God's Table"	Terence Dudley	John Brason	29 November 1978
Approaching Christmas, Lifeline receives a list of demands from a group of orphaned children who have a hidden Group Captain. The man is drifting in and out of consciousness. Albert is worried that it might be a German trap, but the man is handed over to Lifeline disguised as a St Nicolas dummy in a pram. Meanwhile, Brandt gets into an argument with Kessler over the abominable atrocities taking place in Eastern Europe.
27	11	"A Matter of Life and Death"	Roger Jenkins	Robert Barr	6 December 1978
A downed airman kills a German guard rather than be captured. Another two evaders are wrongly thought responsible, but helped after they stumble into the bakery of a Lifeline sympathiser. Another two plan to work with a Communist cell. Knowing that the others still doubt him, François tries to prove his worth by organising the journey down the escape route for each man, and contacts the Communists without Albert’s consent. While visiting the Communists, François is surprised to see Max. As the first stage of his plan to take over Lifeline, Max tips off Kessler so that François is killed as he is meeting one of the airmen from a train.
28	12	"Prisoner of War"	Michael E. Briant	Gerard Glaister	13 December 1978
Brandt's continuing grief over losing his wife leads him to drink heavily, to Kessler's concern. He develops a crush on Monique. While Alain has to hide two airmen, a neighbouring farmer finds an injured German fighter pilot on his land. He turns out to be one of Germany's leading airmen, flying a prototype night fighter unknown to the Allies. Max is dispatched to sketch it, and the British wish to capture the German airman for his information. Max suggests that he and the Communists transport the airman to the French coast, where he might be picked up by a British motor launch in exchange for weapons. Albert now has information confirming Max's involvement in François's death, and arranges for Max to be killed, along with his comrades, after the German airman is picked up by an RAF air-sea rescue launch.
29	13	"Day of Wrath"	[no director credited, but Gerard Glaister]	John Brason	28 December 1978
Belgian pilot Andre De Beers becomes a Gestapo captive and is made to watch his brother being tortured to death. He manages to escape, and contacts Alain, whom he knows from before the war. Seeking revenge, De Beers kills two German soldiers. After Kessler's instruction to take and shoot twenty Belgians in reprisal, Albert tells Alain to kill De Beers to prevent further deaths. However, Monique and Natalie send him down the escape line, and he returns to Britain. When Albert finds out, he tells Monique he will kill her if she disobeys him again. Subsequently Kessler is evaluating 'CCTV' surveillance for Brussels, during which a lone plane piloted by De Beers breaks off from a mission to strafe Gestapo HQ. Meanwhile both the Resistance and the Germans hear news of the D-Day landings on the radio. Kessler finally opens an urgent communiqué from Berlin with news that Brandt has been implicated in the plot to assassinate Hitler, and is to be arrested. Brandt kills himself rather than face torture and execution.

=== Series Three: 1979 ===
No. overall	No. in series	Title	Directed by	Written by	Original release date
30	1	"The Last Run"	Michael E. Briant	N. J. Crisp	22 September 1979
An instant mutual antipathy develops between Kessler and Brandt's replacement, Major Hans Dietrich Reinhardt. Albert and Monique are fearful when Reinhardt visits the Candide with a captured airman. Meanwhile Natalie is finding it increasingly difficult to travel through France with the airmen, because of the disruption to rail travel following the D-Day landings. Paul Vercors, the leader and sole surviving member of Max's cell, discovers Albert's involvement in Max's death and swears revenge.
31	2	"Invasions"	Viktors Ritelis	Lloyd Humphreys	29 September 1979
Lifeline realises it cannot get airmen away to Spain and decides it must keep them in hiding until the Allies liberate Brussels. Reinhardt and Kessler continue to clash. The Luftwaffe man's unorthodox methods show some success and he starts to identify the Lifeline safehouses. Two captives take their own lives rather than face torture, and a third remains silent under interrogation. The elderly Chantal sisters occupy another Lifeline safe house in France, and are rescued by Monique just before the Germans arrive.
32	3	"Revenge"	Roger Chevely	N. J. Crisp	6 October 1979
Kessler suspects that Reinhardt is implicated in the plot to kill Hitler on July 20 because of his extensive contacts with those involved. He believes he can find evidence to prove this. Albert finds out that the Communists plan to kill him. Fearing assassination in the Candide, Albert is helped by an undercover policeman who is also associated with the Communists, if reluctantly, and arrests him after the Candide closes for the night.
33	4	"A Safe Place"	Tristan de Vere Cole	Allan Prior	13 October 1979
Albert finds himself in custody on a charge of having murdered his wife. Monique becomes responsible for leading Lifeline and running the Candide. Meanwhile Reinhardt has set up a dummy German-controlled escape line and is bugging the safe houses to gather intelligence from the airmen. Alain discovers this when he sees its operatives pretend to stage an ambush on German troops, who feign to have been shot. A group of airmen being handled by the German line includes “Mad” Mike Miller, who had previously been returned to the UK by Lifeline. The airmen discover that they are being bugged and manage to escape from the Germans. Monique fears that Miller will betray his knowledge of Lifeline if recaptured, and as they cannot rescue him she orders Alain to shoot him for their own security.
34	5	"Ring of Rosies"	Michael E. Briant	John Brason	20 October 1979
Albert remains in prison and learns from his solicitor that the Communist Paul Vercors is responsible for his arrest. Meanwhile Dr. Keldermans makes an astonishing diagnosis after examining an airman who had flown from North Africa – he is suffering from bubonic plague. Keldermans isolates the whole group, including Monique and himself, and says he will shoot anyone who attempts to leave. After being discovered by Alain and Natalie, one man does try to escape, and is shot and burned. Eventually Dr Keldermans and Monique survive the disease and are able to return.
35	6	"Prisoner"	Tristan DeVere Cole	Robert Barr	27 October 1979
Major Nick Bradley has returned to Belgium to co-ordinate resistance ahead of the Allied advance. Alain is captured seeking to avoid draft for forced labour and, when it is realised his papers are false, held and tortured by the Gestapo. Bradley is determined to recover him, because of what he knows, and as the radio contact with London. Bradley makes a deal with a German officer, using both Lifeline funds and a loan from a Belgian businessman to fund a bribe. The Germans try to substitute another man for Alain when the exchange is made, but they are caught by resistance guards and forced to deliver Alain. Bradley shoots the Germans after the exchange and recovers the money.
36	7	"Ambush"	Michael E. Briant	N. J. Crisp	3 November 1979
In the Ardennes, Bradley is looking after a growing number of former airmen hiding in the forest. He is also working with the resistance, and plans to destroy a convoy of military vehicles carrying vital spare parts for Germany's V2 rockets. To carry out an ambush Bradley needs a man who can repair a jammed French machine gun, and persuades Monique to get a reluctant Flight Lt. Alan Cox to help. He repairs the gun, but under pressure agrees to accompany the ambush in case it jams again in action. When the gun does jam, Cox is killed whilst trying to repair it. After the ambush it transpires that the vehicles in the convoy were in fact empty, travelling to Brussels as part of the German evacuation plans. Albert remains in prison and is assaulted by fellow prisoners for his assumed collaboration. Meanwhile Reinhardt is becoming more suspicious of the Candide and orders Monique, Natalie and Dr Keldermans to be watched and followed.
37	8	"Just Light the Blue Touch-Paper"	Michael E. Briant	John Brason	10 November 1979
A permanent V2 site is discovered on the Belgian/Dutch border, and Bradley plans a raid with the resistance and the army of concealed airmen. Bradley introduces himself to Kessler (posing as a German colleague) and dines with him at the Candide to gain valuable information. Meanwhile Reinhardt is making progress towards cracking Lifeline, and Natalie is suspected. Albert's lawyer contacts Reinhardt for information about the circumstances of his wife's death. The Germans are preparing to evacuate and the atmosphere is becoming openly more hostile towards the remnants of the occupying forces.
38	9	"Sound of Thunder"	Tristan DeVere Cole	Eric Paice	17 November 1979
The Allied advance reaches Belgium, and the Germans are planning to leave Brussels. Bradley establishes contact with other members of the local resistance. Brussels residents are becoming openly hostile to both the Germans and those Belgians assumed to have collaborated. Madeleine has been attacked, but she only has Kessler to turn to. Reinhardt is now almost certain that Lifeline is based at the Candide and he tries to trap Natalie, now becoming romantically involved with Bradley, using a plant in the resistance. Natalie realises the danger at the last minute, and the supposed Communist is exposed as a spy when he fails to recognise Stalin's real name. After the man has been dealt with, Bradley is killed by German soldiers in the street on his way back to the Candide during curfew. The loss of his plant confirms Reinhardt's suspicions about the Candide.
39	10	"Collaborator"	Michael E. Briant	Gerard Glaister	24 November 1979
Albert finally gets released from prison and returns to find 'Collaborator' graffiti on the restaurant. Locals are making open threats to the Candide staff, assuming they have collaborated and profited during the occupation. Alain has offered his farm as a refuge, but Albert will not leave his valuable business, leading to tension with Monique who is having second thoughts about their marriage plans. Natalie and Alain travel through the front line to contact British intelligence, and try to return with them to Brussels as protection for their colleagues. However, on the way back they run into a front line skirmish. As the Germans are vacating the Gestapo building, Reinhardt has captured an airman and the local woman who was hiding him. He wants to finally identify the Candide as Lifeline HQ. He confronts them in the restaurant, but releases his prisoners and turns himself over to Albert rather than take any action. Paul Vercors and his communist cell arrive and take Albert, Monique and Reinhardt prisoner, intending to kill them, in revenge for Max's death.
40	11	"Days of Judgement"	Viktors Ritelis	Eric Paice	1 December 1979
Vercors holds his three prisoners at an unknown location, and intends to execute Albert to avenge Max. Natalie manages to get help from the newly arrived Allies, and saves him just in time. But he is seriously affected by his ordeal. No one knows where Monique has been taken. Kessler is with Madeleine, who has hurt her ankle, trying to escape from Belgium through the countryside. Kessler swaps his identity with a dead German military officer, to disguise his position in the Gestapo, and obliterates the face of the dead German. He is subsequently captured by the British, and goes to a Canadian prisoner of war camp. He claims Madeleine was his hostage and she is 'liberated' by the Allies.
41	12	"Bridgehead"	Andrew Morgan	Michael J. Bird	8 December 1979
Monique is being held in a cage containing women about to have their heads shaved for alleged collaboration. Natalie finds her surrounded by a baying crowd. A British officer, Captain Stephen Durnford, arrives to investigate, and stops the 'punishments'. He disperses the crowd and releases the women. Monique is by now separated from Albert and living with Natalie. Durnford calls back on Monique and falls in love with her. Meanwhile Albert almost visits Monique, but sees the Captain arrive with food and returns unhappily to the Candide. In Holland, two German deserters stow away on the barge of Hans Van Broecken. British troops retreating from the Arnhem offensive are unable to help. When the Germans arrive, they discover the deserters on the barge and shoot all three men dead. In the POW camp, Kessler has been identified by his fellow German captives, but they agree to conceal his true identity from the Allies. Back in Brussels, the Captain asks Monique to marry him and she accepts. The British hand their 60% of the Candide over to Albert.
42	13	"The Execution"	Roger Chevely	John Brason	15 December 1979
Reinhardt is moved to a Canadian POW camp, and finds Kessler pretending to be a captured army officer. Reinhardt admits that he had given himself up to Albert in Brussels. Kessler betrays Reinhardt and presses for a court-martial. Although the senior German officer Oberst von Schalk knows Kessler's true identity and has contempt for Gestapo officers, he is concerned to preserve the reputation of the Wehrmacht. Although Hitler is now dead, Kessler insists on the court-martial being concluded. Reinhardt is shot by guns borrowed from the Canadians, echoing a similar historical incident which occurred in Amsterdam in May 1945. Meanwhile the final victory over Germany is declared. Madeleine bribes a Canadian officer to release Kessler (under his assumed name) and uses forged papers supplied semi-willingly by Monique for them to escape to a new life. The Lifeline members are awarded British military honours for their wartime work, and share out the money Albert has saved during the war. Despite his new financial security, Albert is romantically defeated; Monique marries Captain Durnford on VE day. At the after-wedding party the Lifeline members get together for one last time, and toast their survival and their missing friends.
43	14	"What Did You Do in the War, Daddy?"	Viktors Ritelis	John Brason	(never broadcast)
In 1969, Albert, Monique, Natalie and Alain contribute to a British television documentary In Our Time on the quarter-century anniversary of Brussels' liberation from the Nazis. Manfred Dorf, a German industrialist, is challenged by investigative journalists who (correctly) believe he is Kessler. The ex-Lifeline members meet at the Candide, still owned by Albert, and reminisce about their common past. NB: This episode was withdrawn from transmission for reasons that remain unclear. It has never been broadcast, and has not been included in DVD releases of the series.
