= Skorpion (TV series) =

- Created by: Arden Winch
- Written by: John Brason
- Directed by: Michael Hayes
- Starring: Terrence Hardiman; Michael Denison; Marianne Borgo; Neville Jason; Daniel Hill; Jack McKenzie
- Theme music composer: Simon May
- Country of origin: United Kingdom
- Original language: English
- No. of series: 1
- No. of episodes: 6

Production
- Producer: Gerard Glaister
- Running time: 50 minutes

Original release
- Network: BBC1
- Release: 12 January – 16 February 1983

Related
- Blood Money; Cold Warrior

Skorpion is a British television serial transmitted by the BBC in 1983.

A sequel (of sorts) to the 1981 series Blood Money, Skorpion saw Michael Denison, Daniel Hill and Jack McKenzie reprise their roles from the original serial. A mysterious plane crash in the Scottish highlands and a woman pursued by a hitman are cases investigated by the Anti-Terrorism Squad.

== Cast ==
- Terrence Hardiman as Chief Supt. Franks
- Michael Denison as Captain Aubrey Percival
- Marianne Borgo as Gabrielle
- Daniel Hill as Inspector Clark
- Jack McKenzie as Chief Inspector Perry
- Neville Jason as Constant Delangre
- Tamara Ustinov as WPC Baker
- Mary Wimbush as Agatha
- Ian Cullen as Inspector Hallisay
- James Kennedy as Mr. X
- Tom Chadbon as Dr. Ormiston
