= Cold Warrior (TV series) =

Television series

- Created by: Arden Winch
- Starring: Michael Denison; Lucy Fleming; Dean Harris; David Swift
- Theme music composer: Simon May; Leslie Osborne
- Country of origin: United Kingdom
- Original language: English
- No. of series: 1
- No. of episodes: 8

Production
- Producer: Gerard Glaister
- Running time: 30 minutes

Original release
- Network: BBC1
- Release: 12 September – 31 October 1984

Related
- Skorpion

Cold Warrior is a British television series produced by the BBC in 1984.

The series was based around the character of Captain Aubrey Percival (Michael Denison), first introduced in the 1981 thriller serial Blood Money. Moving away from the serial format of Blood Money and Skorpion, Cold Warrior was a series of eight stand-alone episodes, which saw Percival dealing with various threats to national security. He was assisted by Jo (Lucy Fleming) and Danny Quirk (Dean Harris) - the latter also reprising his role from Blood Money.

== Cast ==
- Michael Denison as Captain Aubrey Percival
- Lucy Fleming as Jo
- Dean Harris as Danny Quirk
- David Swift as Sir William Logie

== Episodes ==
No.	Title	Directed by	Written by	Original release date
1	"Bright Sting"	Andrew Morgan	Murray Smith	12 September 1984
2	"Dead Wrong"	Andrew Morgan	Murray Smith	19 September 1984
3	"What's Good for General Bullmoose"	Pennant Roberts	John Brason	26 September 1984
4	"The Man from Damascus"	Andrew Morgan	Murray Smith	3 October 1984
5	"The Immigrants"	Andrew Morgan	John Brason	10 October 1984
6	"The Sprat"	Pennant Roberts	Arden Winch	17 October 1984
7	"A Message from Trebizond"	Pennant Roberts	David Reid	24 October 1984
8	"Hook, Line and Sinker"	Pennant Roberts	Murray Smith	31 October 1984
