= Roy Herrick =

British actor (1936–1988)

- Born: Roy Herring; 22 July 1936; Stepney, London, England
- Died: 11 October 1988 (aged 52); Chelsea, London, England
- Occupation: Actor

Roy Herrick (22 July 1936 – 11 October 1988) was a British actor.

== Early life ==
Having initially been interested in painting and sketching, Herrick was recommended to take a career in fabric design by a teacher at school. However, after being told he looked like the actor John Fraser, he decided to think about acting. After doing national service in the British Army, Herrick went to drama school. His first-ever stage work was working at the Little Theatre in Great Yarmouth as an assistant stage manager and juvenile lead for 14 weeks. After six months as an assistant stage manager and actor at Ipswich, he decided to try his luck in London and found work almost immediately.

== Career ==
His television credits include: The Spread of the Eagle, Object Z, Danger Man, Public Eye, Callan, The Regiment, Colditz, Survivors, Doctor Who (in the serials The Reign of Terror, The Face of Evil and The Invisible Enemy), Pardon My Genie, George and Mildred, Robin’s Nest, Tenko, The Fourth Arm, Mr. Palfrey of Westminster and Howards' Way.

Roy also played the barman in two episodes of You're Only Young Twice - 'The Missing Ring' and 'The Home Perm'.

== Selected filmography ==
- The Whisperers (1967) as Young Doctor
- All the Right Noises (1970) as Camera Operator (uncredited)
- Priest of Love (1981) as Warren Gallery Reporter
