= Jack McKenzie (actor) =

Scottish actor

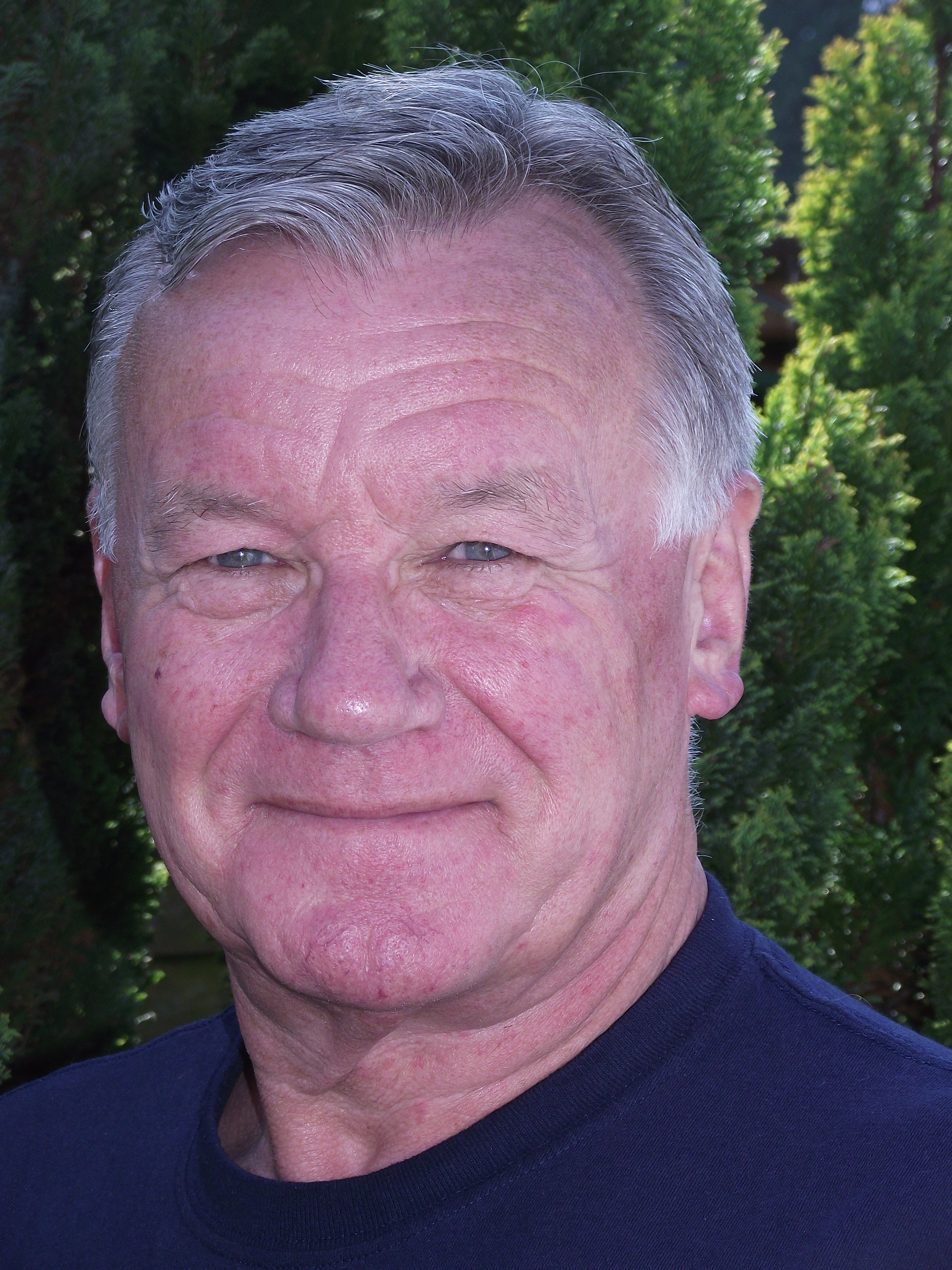
- McKenzie in 2014
- Born: 9 March 1942 (age 84); Edinburgh, Scotland
- Occupation: Actor
- Years active: 1973–2018

Jack McKenzie (born 9 March 1942) is a Scottish actor. He was born in Edinburgh and was educated at George Heriot's School, after which he joined the Royal Marines at the age of fifteen. He subsequently joined Lothians and Peebles Constabulary and later transferred to Edinburgh City Police.

== Film ==
- Valentino (Ken Russell) (1977) - (uncredited)
- A Bridge Too Far (Richard Attenborough) (1977) - Soldier #17
- Dominique (Michael Anderson) (1979) - John, 1st Chauffeur
- Star Wars: Episode V - The Empire Strikes Back (Irvin Kershner) (1980) - Cal Alder (Rebel Force Deck Lieutenant)
- Gandhi (Richard Attenborough) (1982) - Major at Aga Khan Palace
- The Zero Option (Sarah Hellings) (1988) - Dunstan
- Beyond Bedlam (Vadim Jean) (1994) - DCI Clery
- Clockwork Mice (Vadim Jean) (1995) - CID 1
- The End of the Affair (Neil Jordan) (1999) - Chief Engineer
- The Calling (Richard Caesar) (2000) - Norman
- The Love We Seek (Samuel Roffey)
- The House That Jack Built (2018) - Sonny - Zentropa Films - Lars Von Trier

== Television ==
- Sutherland's Law (1973–1975) - Police sergeant / Officer in Charge / PC Merengie
- The Sweeney (1975) - Len
- Space 1999 (1976) - Technician (2 episodes)
- The Other One (1977) - Bill Burke
- Return of the Saint (1978) - Marek
- Secret Army (1979) - Major Neil Turner
- Blake's 7 (1980) - Patar
- The Gentle Touch (1980) - Hamish
- The Professionals (1980) - Rose
- Barriers (1981) - Sportsmaster
- The Treachery Game (1981) - Alec Marsh
- Blood Money (1981) - Det. Insp. Perry
- Angels (1982) - Mr. McGraw
- The Mad Death (1983) - Fergus
- Skorpion (1983) - Chief Insp. Perry
- Play for Today - Last Love (1983) - Gerald Castle
- Taggart (1986–2001) - Jim Redpath / David Laing / Alan Donald
- The Collectors (1986) - Calvin Simpson
- Piece of Cake (1988) - 'Ram' Ramsey
- Science Fiction - The Smoking Gun (1990)
- Heartbeat (1993) - Mr. Brown
- Bugs (1995) - Host
- Bernard's Watch (1998–2001) - Postman
- The Bill (1998) - Mack
- EastEnders (2010) - Donald
- Emmerdale (2015) - Tom
- " Home Alone" (2016) (Discovery Channel) Jeff Young - October Films

== Theatre ==
- Gothenburg English Studio Theatre, The Woman in Black
- The Watermill Theatre, Hobson's Choice
- Royal National Theatre, The Misanthrope, Engaged and into The Mouths of Crabs
- Wintershall, Guildford, The Passion and The Life of Christ (4 seasons)
- Redgrave Theatre, Farnham, MacBeth, Who Killed Cock Robin, The Trial of Lady Chatterley
- Farnham Maltings, Sorry To Spoil Your Daughter's Birthday
- Pantomimes at Guildford Civic Hall and Bracknell

== Musical theatre ==
- The English Theatre, Frankfurt, City of Angels
- Brighton Festival, Paul - A Strange kind of Hero
- First Major UK and Ireland Tour of Dirty Dancing
