= The Balance of Nature =

1983 British television drama film

- Directed by: Paul Annett
- Written by: Margaret Leclere; Maggie Brooks (script)
- Produced by: Nicholas Palmer
- Starring: Leslie Ash; Philip Bretherton; Juliet Hammond
- Release date: 14 August 1983
- Running time: 60 minutes
- Country: United Kingdom
- Language: English

The Balance of Nature is a 1983 British television drama film directed by Paul Annett, starring Leslie Ash.

== Outline ==
The film is about the beauty business, seen mostly through the eyes of a Cockney girl from a tower block. Dawn Winch (Leslie Ash) lives with her mother (Marianne Stone) and works in a West End beauty parlour. She has aspirations to win the Miss United Kingdom competition, but finds that the beauty queen game is more of a jungle than she foresaw.

== Cast ==
- Leslie Ash as Dawn Winch
- Philip Bretherton as Spencer Fairfax
- Juliet Hammond as Natasha
- Sandy Ratcliff as Julie
- David Freedman as Gregore
- Marianne Stone as Dawn's mother
- Hetty Baynes as Blanche
- Francis Lloyd as Neville
- Valerie Testa as Organiser
- Sylvia Barter as Countess
- Pamela Miles as Brenda
