= John Brason =

British script writer and script editor

John Brason (29 June 1924 - 2003) was a British scriptwriter and script editor, best known for the series made in collaboration with television producer Gerard Glaister, Colditz and Secret Army both set during World War II.

Brason was known for his anti-communism, among the reasons he believed for the non-broadcast of his final scripted episode of Secret Army, "What Did You Do During the War, Daddy?"

== Credits ==
=== As writer ===
- Colditz (1972)
- Moonbase 3 (1973)
- Special Branch (1974)
- Boy Dominic (1974)
- Blood Relations (originally Bloedverwanten, 1977)
- Secret Army (1977–79)
- The Fourth Arm (1979)
- Buccaneer (1980)
- Enemy at the Door (1980)
- Diamonds (1981)
- Kessler (1981)
- Chessgame (1983)
- Skorpion (1983)
- Cold Warrior (1984)

=== Script Editor ===
- Secret Army (1977–79)
- Buccaneer (1980)
- Blood Money (1981)
- Howards' Way (1985–86)

=== Director ===
- Walk a Crooked Path (1969)

== Novels ==
- Secret Army (prequel to series one of the TV series)
- The Secret Army Dossier (largely covers the period between series one and series two)
- Secret Army: The End of the Line (third series)
- Kessler
- Howards' Way: No. 3
