= Buccaneer (TV series) =

- Genre: Adventure
- Created by: N.J. Crisp; Eric Paice
- Starring: Bryan Marshall; Mark Jones; Clifford Rose; Pamela Salem; Carolyn Courage; Shirley Anne Field
- Country of origin: United Kingdom
- Original language: English
- No. of series: 1
- No. of episodes: 13

Production
- Producer: Gerard Glaister
- Running time: 50 minutes

Original release
- Network: BBC1
- Release: 27 April – 20 July 1980

Buccaneer is a British thirteen-part television series produced by the BBC from 1979 to 1980. Created by experienced television writer NJ Crisp, it was broadcast over 13 weeks from April to July 1980.

Buccaneer, dealing with a developing air freight business, starred Bryan Marshall, Mark Jones, Pamela Salem and Clifford Rose, and was produced by Gerard Glaister. John Brason, who had previously worked with Glaister on Secret Army, served as script editor.

The first episode of Buccaneer concerned people leaving the fictional country of Ximbali. This presaged real-life events when people fled from the former Rhodesia, which had been renamed Zimbabwe.

Buccaneer was the first BBC drama series to be broadcast with Ceefax subtitles for the hearing impaired.

== Regular cast ==
- Bryan Marshall - Tony Blair
- Clifford Rose - Charles Burton
- Pamela Salem - Monica Burton
- Mark Jones - Ray Mason
- Carolyn Courage - Kim Hayward
- Shirley Anne Field - Janet Blair
- Chris Humphreys - Paul Blair

== Episodes ==
No.	Title	Directed by	Written by	Designed by	Original release date
1	"Reluctant Hero"	Ken Grieve	J. B. Flack	Myles Lang	27 April 1980
2	"Albatross"	Marc Miller	J. B. Flack	Stanley Morris	4 May 1980
3	"Grounded"	Andrew Morgan	N. J. Crisp	Myles Lang	11 May 1980
4	"A Kind of Cuckoo"	Ken Grieve	N. J. Crisp	Stanley Morris	18 May 1980
5	"Let's Make a Killing"	Marc Miller	John Brason	Myles Lang	25 May 1980
6	"The Thin End"	Andrew Morgan	John Brason	Stanley Morris	1 June 1980
7	"Somebody's Telling Lies"	Tristan de Vere Cole	David Crane	Mary Spencer	8 June 1980
8	"Private Arrangements"	Marc Miller	David Crane	Stanley Morris	15 June 1980
9	"Intruders"	Andrew Morgan	Ben Steed	Myles Lang	22 June 1980
10	"Feet of Clay"	Tristan de Vere Cole	Ben Steed	Stanley Morris	29 June 1980
11	"Eldorado"	Marc Miller	N. J. Crisp	Myles Lang	6 July 1980
12	"A No Go Item"	Andrew Morgan	N. J. Crisp	Stanley Morris	13 July 1980
13	"Emergency"	Tristan de Vere Cole	N. J. Crisp	Mary Spencer	20 July 1980

== Production ==
The aircraft featured in the series was a Bristol Britannia of Redcoat Air Cargo, registration G-BRAC, which wore the markings of 'Redair', the name of the fictional airline in the series.

One reason for there being only one series (13 episodes) of Buccaneer was that the Bristol Britannia G-BRAC was destroyed in a crash near Boston, Massachusetts, on 16 February 1980, shortly after the completion of filming, but just before transmission of the series. Of the eight people on board, seven were killed, and only one survived, albeit seriously injured.

With the 'starring aircraft' destroyed in a crash, plans for a second series were abandoned.

== DVD release ==
Buccaneer has not been released on video or DVD. It became overshadowed by ITV's better-remembered post-Second World War drama Airline, starring Roy Marsden, which was first broadcast in 1982.

BROADCAST RE-RUN From 25 February 2026 a rerun of the series was shown on Talking Pictures TV in the UK.
