= Rob Edwards (actor) =

English actor

- Born: Worcester, Worcestershire
- Occupation: Actor
- Years active: 1976–present

Rob Edwards is an English actor.

Edwards' television credits include: Doctor Who (the serials The Face of Evil and The Robots of Death), An Englishman's Castle, Secret Army, The Fourth Arm, By the Sword Divided, The Practice, Casualty, A Touch of Frost, Dangerfield, Midsomer Murders and Dalziel and Pascoe.

Edwards attended RGS Worcester and Pembroke College, Oxford before training at the Bristol Old Vic Theatre School. He then joined the Royal Shakespeare Company in Stratford. He has performed in many productions including the BBC Shakespeare films of Henry V and Henry IV, Part 1 and Henry IV, Part 2 as Prince John. Other stage roles include Hippolito in Women Beware Women by Thomas Middleton with the RSC in 2006, and Scar in Disney's The Lion King at the Lyceum Theatre in London for several years. For the latter, he was nominated Best Actor in a Musical at the Olivier Awards in 2000.
