= The Case of Marcel Duchamp =

1984 British film by David Rowan

The Case of Marcel Duchamp is a 1984 British art history documentary-cum-mystery film sponsored by the Arts Council of Great Britain, directed by David Rowan and starring Guy Rolfe, Raymond Francis, Harold Innocent and Juliet Hammond. Sherlock Holmes and Doctor Watson come out of retirement to solve a final case concerning the artist Marcel Duchamp. The film concentrates on Duchamp's The Bride Stripped Bare by Her Bachelors, Even and includes excerpts from a 1958 BBC TV interview with Duchamp and specially made English-language recreations of scenes from Raymond Roussel's 1912 play Impressions d'Afrique.

== Cast ==
- Guy Rolfe as Sherlock Holmes
- Raymond Francis as Dr. Watson
- Juliet Hammond
- Harold Innocent
- Bernard Kay
- Charles Lewsen
- Bruce Lidington
- Sarah Mortimer
- Jonathan Newth
- Jeff Rawle
- Geoffrey Russell
- Charles Spicer
