= Angela Richards =

English actress and singer (born 1944)

- Born: 18 December 1944 (age 81); Leicestershire

Angela Richards (born 18 December 1944) is an English actress. A graduate of RADA, she is also known for her body of work in musical theatre.

== Biography ==
=== Theatre ===
Richards has starred in several West End productions such as Robert and Elizabeth (her debut in 1964), Cats (following Elaine Paige as Grizabella), High Society, Blood Brothers, Cole and the title role in Liza of Lambeth. Later musical theatre work includes: Dorothy Fields Forever and Call Me Merman.

In March 2006, over two nights at the King's Head Theatre, Richards returned to the songs she created for Secret Army, in a show entitled An Evening at Le Candide, which was subsequently made into a studio-recorded CD. Between September 2007 and June 2008 she appeared as Fraulein Schneider in the musical Cabaret in London's West End opposite Julian Clary and Amy Nuttall.

=== Television ===
Richards is best known to television viewers for her leading role in the BBC drama Secret Army (1977–1979), set during the Second World War in which she played Monique Duchamps, member of the Belgian Resistance and resident chanteuse at the restaurant Le Candide. She reprised her role of Monique in Secret Army's follow up series Kessler (1981).

Richards starred as Sheila Jones, private secretary to the roguish Cecil Caine in the Minder episode "Senior Citizen Caine" (1984). Her other television credits include Villette, Candide (a BBC Play of the Month, 1973), King of the Castle (1977), Across the Lake (1988) with Anthony Hopkins and Hetty Wainthrop Investigates (1996).
