= Robert Haggiag =

American film producer

Robert Haggiag (5 October 1913 – 1 March 2009) was an Italian film producer.

== Life ==
He was born in 1913 in Tripoli, Italian Libya. In 1966 he won a David di Donatello Award for "Best Production".

== Filmography ==
- 1950: The Thief of Venice
- 1954: The Barefoot Contessa
- 1965: The Birds, the Bees and the Italians
- 1967: The Climax
- 1968: Candy
- 1993: Lady Chatterley
