= Sarah Mortimer =

British actress

Sarah Mortimer is a British actress. She has worked extensively in both television and theatre.

== Life ==
Mortimer trained at the London Academy of Music and Dramatic Art (LAMDA) and her stage career includes Peter Hall's production of Coriolanus with Ian Mckellen, playing the original Alice in "Daisy pulls it off" in London's West End, Ned Sherrin's "Sloane Ranger Review" also in the West End, and the lead role in the World Premiere of Bob Eaton's musical, "Good Golly, Miss Molly!", at the New Victoria Theatre, Staffordshire.

Mortimer played minor television parts in the series Friday Night, Saturday Morning and Jemima Shore Investigates and starred in the 1984 film The Case of Marcel Duchamp. More important television roles then followed in the mid eighties including Hot Metal (3 episodes, 1986) and Fast Forward (6 episodes, 1987). In the late eighties and early nineties Mortimer went on to star in numerous popular British sitcoms You Rang, M'Lord?, Traffik, One Foot in the Grave, The Upper Hand (2 episodes, 1992) and Drop The Dead Donkey.

Her theatre work includes the Intimate Exchanges series by Alan Ayckbourn at the New Victoria Theatre with Adam Norton as well as the role of Molly in Good Golly, Miss Molly, a musical by Bob Eaton in 1989 and in 1993.
