= Codename (TV series) =

- Genre: Drama
- Created by: Bill Hays; David Sullivan Proudfoot
- Starring: Clifford Evans; Alexandra Bastedo; Anthony Valentine; Brian Peck
- Country of origin: United Kingdom
- Original language: English
- No. of series: 1
- No. of episodes: 13

Production
- Producer: Gerard Glaister
- Running time: 50 minutes

Original release
- Network: BBC2
- Release: 7 April – 30 June 1970

Codename is a short-lived British television series produced by the BBC in 1970.

An espionage thriller series, Codename recounted the activities of a secret organisation, MI17, being run from a residential hall at Cambridge University. The programme, lasting for one series of thirteen episodes, was produced by Gerard Glaister and starred Clifford Evans, Alexandra Bastedo, Anthony Valentine and Brian Peck. It was preceded by a one-off pilot play, with a different cast.

The leads were well known from other series when this series was originally transmitted, Valentine from Callan, Bastedo from The Champions and Evans from The Power Game, and the first episode featured on the cover of the Radio Times. However, unlike its rival Callan on ITV, Codename failed to capture the public imagination, and no further series were made.

No episodes survive in the BBC archive, though there is a recording of the pilot.

== Cast ==
- Clifford Evans as Sir Iain Dalzell
- Alexandra Bastedo as Diana Dalzell
- Anthony Valentine as Philip West
- Brian Peck as Culliford

== Episodes ==
- "Kingsmate"
- "Target"
- "A Walk with The Lions"
- "One for the Lobster Pot"
- "Come Home to Paradise"
- "Warhead"
- "The Big Plant"
- "The Quickness of the Hand"
- "Have a Word with Greco"
- "The Alpha Men"
- "Appointment in Prague"
- "Opening Gambit"
- "The Unbidden Guest"
