= Philip Bretherton =

English actor

Philip E Bretherton
- Born: 30 May 1955 (age 71); Preston, Lancashire, England
- Occupations: Actor, presenter
- Years active: 1977–present
- Partner: Sharon Baines

Philip Bretherton (born 30 May 1955 in Amounderness, Lancashire) is an English actor and his roles include Alistair Deacon in the British television series As Time Goes By.

== Early life ==
Bretherton was born to John Bretherton and Anne Taylor in Amounderness, Lancashire, and studied English and drama at the University of Manchester, where he decided to become an actor.

As a young man, Bretherton was in an episode of the BBC TV series Miss Marple: "At Bertram's Hotel", playing Detective Inspector Campbell in 1987. Another early screen role came in The Balance of Nature (1983).

== Career ==
Bretherton appeared in Rumpole of the Bailey in "The Barrow Boy" in November 1988 and made a brief appearance as Rod in Coronation Street also in 1988. He returned as Robert Weston in 1991, and again as Ian Davenport in 2004.

He was in Casualty as Andrew Bower (Lisa "Duffy" Duffin's husband), Footballer's Wives as Stefan Hauser, New Tricks as Doug Standeven. He also appeared in an episode of The Casebook of Sherlock Holmes, "The Problem of Thor Bridge" in 1990 as Mr. Joyce Cummings Q.C. He has appeared in Series 1 of Murder in Suburbia, as Phillip Whitmore. He further appeared in the episode "Last Seen Wearing" of the television series Inspector Morse in the role of French teacher David Acum. He also appeared in the fifth and final series of Young Dracula as Roquelaire, the vampire high council's head of security and father of Vlad Dracula's bodyguard Talitha. He played Matthew Woodley in Midsomer Murders "Made-to-Measure Murders" in 2010, and as Alistair Deacon in As Time Goes By from 1992 to 2002 and then 2005 for a reunion special.

=== Theatre ===
He is also active in theatre, performing as Henry Higgins in a production of Pygmalion at Clwyd Theatr Cymru, Mold, Flintshire.

=== Video Games ===
Philip has also featured as the voice of The Narrator in The Plucky Squire, developed by All Possible Futures.

== Filmography ==
- The Balance of Nature (1983)
- Cry Freedom (1987)
- Dark Floors (2008)
- The Fifth Estate (2013)
