= Moonstrike =

1963 British television war anthology series

- Genre: War anthology
- Composer: Dudley Simpson
- Country of origin: United Kingdom
- Original language: English
- No. of series: 1
- No. of episodes: 27 (21 missing)

Production
- Producers: Gerard Glaister (19 episodes); David Gerrard (8 episodes)
- Running time: 50 minutes
- Production company: BBC

Original release
- Network: BBC
- Release: 21 February – 22 August 1963

Moonstrike is a British television series produced by the BBC in 1963.

The series is an anthology programme: a collection of self-contained stories about acts of resistance in occupied Europe during the Second World War. Producer Gerard Glaister drew upon his own wartime experiences, having served as a pilot in the RAF.

Most of the music for the series was provided by composer Dudley Simpson, and was some of his first work in the field of composing 'incidental music'.

Of the 27 episodes that were made, only three were known to exist until 2 October 2024, when the Film Is Fabulous project announced the recovery of a 16mm telerecording of the episode "He Who Tells". The recording was returned to the BBC for preservation. This means that 4 of the 27 episodes of Moonstrike now exist in the BBC archives.

== Episodes ==
No.	Episode	Transmitted
1	"Home by Four"	21 Feb 1963
2	"A Clear Field"	28 Feb 1963
3	"Message Received" (Note: Episode survives.)	7 Mar 1963
4	"Five Hours to Kill"	14 Mar 1963
5	"Return to Danger"	21 Mar 1963
6	"A Safe House"	28 Mar 1963
7	"Danger by Appointment"	4 Apr 1963
8	"Unwelcome Guest"	11 Apr 1963
9	"Round Trip"	18 Apr 1963
10	"No Joy"	25 Apr 1963
11	"A Sunday Morning"	2 May 1963
12	"Death Sentence"	9 May 1963
13	"The Expert"	16 May 1963
14	"Four To Go"	23 May 1963
15	"Last Act"	30 May 1963
16	"A Girl Friend"	6 Jun 1963
17	"The Biggest Bandit"	13 Jun 1963
18	"The Escape"	20 Jun 1963
19	"Rush Job"	27 Jun 1963
20	"He Who Tells"	4 Jul 1963
21	"A Matter of Trust"	11 Jul 1963
22	"The Factory"	18 Jul 1963
23	"The Canary"	25 Jul 1963
24	"Try Out"	1 Aug 1963
25	"The Bells Are Silent"	8 Aug 1963
26	"No Heroics"	15 Aug 1963
27	"The Last Mission"	27 Aug 1963
