= Shadey =

- Theatrical release poster
- Directed by: Philip Saville
- Written by: Snoo Wilson
- Produced by: Otto Plaschkes
- Starring: Antony Sher; Billie Whitelaw; Patrick Macnee; Leslie Ash; Bernard Hepton; Larry Lamb; Katherine Helmond
- Cinematography: Roger Deakins
- Music by: Colin Towns
- Production companies: FilmFour International; Larkspur
- Distributed by: Mainline Pictures
- Release dates: 18 November 1985 (London Film Festival); 5 June 1987 (United States)
- Running time: 90 minutes
- Country: United Kingdom
- Language: English
- Budget: £959,000
- Box office: $65,817

Shadey is a 1985 British comedy film directed by Philip Saville and starring Antony Sher, Billie Whitelaw and Patrick Macnee. The screenplay concerns a clairvoyant who is recruited by British intelligence for a secret mission.

== Cast ==
- Antony Sher – Oliver Shadey
- Billie Whitelaw – Doctor Cloud
- Patrick Macnee – Sir Cyril Landau
- Larry Lamb – Dick Darnley
- Katherine Helmond – Lady Constance Landau
- Leslie Ash – Carol Landau
- Bernard Hepton – Captain Amies
- Jesse Birdsall – Carl
- Jonathan Scott-Taylor – Arthur
- Jenny Runacre – Shop assistant
- Olivier Pierre – Manson
- Jon Cartwright – Shulman
- Stephen Persaud – Winston

== Release ==
The film premiered at the London Film Festival on 18 November 1985. It was distributed by Mainline Pictures in the United Kingdom.

The film was released by Skouras Pictures in the United States on 5 June 1987 and grossed over $65,817.

Shadey has been very rarely shown on TV - it was shown on Channel 4 in April 1988 as part of its Film On 4 stand and the last known broadcast was on ABC in Australia on Christmas Day 1996. Apart from VHS rental soon after its release, it had long been unavailable on Video, DVD or streaming platforms- until it became available to stream via the Britbox service in September 2021.

== Bibliography ==
- Ginibre, Jean-Louis. Ladies Or Gentlemen: A Pictorial History of Male Cross-Dressing in the Movies. Filipacchi, 2005.
