= The Revenue Men =

British TV crime series (1967–1968)

- Genre: Drama
- Country of origin: United Kingdom
- Original language: English
- No. of series: 3
- No. of episodes: 39 (all missing)

Production
- Producer: Gerard Glaister
- Production company: BBC

Original release
- Release: 28 March 1967 – 14 June 1968

The Revenue Men is a British television series, produced and transmitted by the BBC between 1967 and 1968.

The series dealt with cases handled by the Investigation Branch of Customs and Excise such as the illegal import of goods, illegal immigration and business transactions amongst travellers.

The Revenue Men was produced by Gerard Glaister. The series lasted for three series and 39 episodes in total. In spite of this fact, all of the episodes were later wiped, with no episodes extant in the BBC archives as of 2009.

== Cast ==
- Ewen Solon as Caesar Smith
- Calum Mill as Stuart Campbell
- James Grant as Ross McInnes
- Claire Nielson as Luke Frazer
