= Walk a Crooked Path =

1969 British film by John Brason

- Directed by: John Brason
- Written by: Barry Perowne
- Produced by: John Brason; Derek Horne
- Starring: Tenniel Evans; Faith Brook; Patricia Haines
- Cinematography: John Taylor
- Edited by: Ron Pope
- Music by: Leslie Bridgewater
- Production company: Hanover Productions
- Distributed by: Butcher's Film Service
- Release date: October 1969
- Running time: 88 minutes
- Country: United Kingdom
- Language: English

Walk a Crooked Path (also known as Twilight Man) is a 1969 British crime film directed by John Brason and starring Tenniel Evans, Faith Brook and Patricia Haines. It was written by Barry Perowne.

== Plot ==
At a boarding school, a man plans to murder his wealthy teacher wife.

== Cast ==
- Tenniel Evans as John Hemming
- Faith Brook as Elizabeth Hemming
- Christopher Coll as Bill Coleman
- Patricia Haines as Nancy Coleman
- Clive Endersby as Philip Dreeper
- Georgina Simpson as Elaine
- Margery Mason as Aunt Mildred
- Georgina Cookson as Imogen Dreeper
- Peter Copley as Arnold Oberon
- Paul Dawkins as Inspector
- Barry Perowne as Unwins
- Robert Powell as Mullvaney

== Production ==
The film's sets were designed by the art director Wilfred Arnold.

== Reception ==
The Monthly Film Bulletin wrote: "Walk a Crooked Path is the end product of a daunting series of production problems which began in 1966. Twice commenced and twice abandoned, it was eventually taken over by the present company who decided to scrap everything that had already been filmed, salvaging from the second attempt the composer and three of the cast. Finished and released at last, the story turns out to be rather reminiscent of The Children's Hour (a pupil's accusation, unwittingly accurate, that his teacher is homosexual), but the film is an efficient little piece, ably directed and performed and very attractively scored, although marred by some distracting lumps of padding and a dire lack of light relief in the otherwise capable writing."

In The Radio Times Guide to Films Adrian Turner gave the film 3/5 stars, writing: "The plot is quite clever, revealed in flashbacks and sudden twists and revelling in the rather risqué elements."
