= Bernard Kay =

English actor (1928–2014)

- Publicity shot, c. 1955
- Born: Bernard Frederic Bemrose Kay; 23 February 1928; Bolton, Lancashire, England
- Died: 25 December 2014 (aged 86); London, England
- Occupation: Actor
- Years active: 1950–2010
- Spouse: Patricia Haines (m. 1963; died 1977)

Bernard Frederic Bemrose Kay (23 February 1928 – 25 December 2014) was an English actor with an extensive theatre, television, and film repertoire.

== Early life ==
Kay began his working life as a reporter for the Bolton Evening News, and a stringer for the Manchester Guardian. He was conscripted in 1946 and started acting in the army. Kay gained a scholarship to study at the Old Vic Theatre School and became a professional in 1950, as a member of the company which reopened the Old Vic after World War II.

== Career ==
Kay appeared in over one hundred television productions including Emmerdale Farm, The Champions, The Cellar and the Almond Tree, Clayhanger, A Very British Coup, Casualty, Casualty 1909, Doctors, Z-Cars, Space: 1999, Coronation Street, Jonathan Creek, Foyle's War and London's Burning.

Kay portrayed Captain Stanley Lord of the SS Californian in the BBC dramatisation Trial by Inquiry: Titanic in 1967.

The 1970s saw Kay play the role of Philip Bentley in The Protectors episode A Pocketful of Posies (1973) and appear as the underworld crime boss Harry Scott in an episode of the British police drama The Professionals, the episode entitled When the Heat Cools Off (1978).

Kay's later television credits include as bandit leader Cordova in the Zorro television episode "Alejandro Rides Again" in 1991 which was filmed in Madrid, Spain. Kay also gave a sympathetic performance as Korporal Hartwig in an early episode of Colditz.

Kay appeared four times in the Doctor Who series in various roles, most notably as Saladin in the classic Doctor Who story The Crusade in 1965. He also appeared in the serials The Dalek Invasion of Earth (1964), The Faceless Ones (1967) and Colony in Space (1971). In 2006, he guest-starred in the Doctor Who audio adventure Night Thoughts.

Kay's best-known film appearance was his role as a Bolshevik leader in Doctor Zhivago (1965).

=== Stage ===
Kay also acted extensively on the stage. In 1952, for the Nottingham Rep, he learned, rehearsed, and played Macbeth in less than 24 hours. In 1984, he played Shylock in a British Council tour of Asia, ending in Baghdad, in the middle of the Iraq/Iran war. Other theatre includes An Inspector Calls (Garrick Theatre), Macbeth (Nottingham Playhouse), Titus Andronicus (European Tour), A Man for All Seasons (International Tour), The Merchant of Venice (International Tour), Galileo (Young Vic), Death of a Salesman (Lyric Theatre, Belfast)—for which he was nominated as best actor in the RITA awards in 1998—and Halpern and Johnson (New End Theatre). He twice appeared at the Finborough Theatre in London: in 2006 in After Haggerty and in 2010 in Dream of the Dog.

== Personal life ==
Kay was married to the actress Patricia Haines from 1963 until her death from cancer in 1977; he never remarried, and was said to have been grief-stricken for the rest of his life. Kay had no children of his own, but was stepfather to Haines's daughter from her first marriage to the actor Michael Caine. He died in London on Christmas Day in 2014, at the age of 86.

In the 2006 New Writing Ventures awards, Kay won the Creative Non-fiction prize for the first chapter of his unpublished memoir Maybe A Bastard, which covered his childhood in Bolton. It remained unpublished at his death.

== Selected filmography ==
- Carry On Sergeant (1958) – Injured Recruit
- Backfire! (1962) – Fire Chief
- Doctor Who (1965) – Saladin and Carl Tyler
- Doctor Zhivago (1965) – Kuril, The Bolshevik
- Doctor Who (1967) – Inspector Crossland
- The Lion, the Witch and the Wardrobe (1967, TV Series) – Aslan
- They Came from Beyond Space (1967) – Richard Arden
- The Shuttered Room (1967) – Tait
- Torture Garden (1967) – Dr. Heim (segment 2 "Terror Over Hollywood")
- Interlude (1968) – George Selworth
- Witchfinder General (1968) – Fisherman
- Darling Lili (1970) – Bedford
- Trog (1970) – Inspector Greenham
- Doctor Who (1971) – Caldwell
- The Hunting Party (1971) – Buford King
- Running Scared (1972) – Mr. Willis
- Emmerdale Farm (1974) – Robert Sharp
- The Hiding Place (1975) – Fred Koonstra
- Voyage of the Damned (1976) – Cuba Harbour pilot (uncredited)
- Spy Story (1976) – Commander Wheeler
- Sweeney! (1977) – Matthews
- Sinbad and the Eye of the Tiger (1977) – Zabid
- The Professionals (1978) – Harry Scott
- The Great Riviera Bank Robbery (1979) – Commissaire
- The Case of Marcel Duchamp (1984)
- The Most Dangerous Man in the World (1988) – Dogan
- London's Burning (1989) – Chief Fire Officer
- A Ghost in Monte Carlo (1990) – Police Chief Gutier
- Coronation Street (1994) – Mr Phillips
- Steal This Movie (2000) – John Hoffman
- Foyle's War: The White Feather (2002) – Robert Woolton
- Puritan (2005) – The old man
- Pierrepoint: The Last Hangman (2005) – Uncle Tom
- Joy Division (2006) – Bothringaye
- Psychosis (2010) – Reverend Swan (final film role)
