= Juliet Hammond-Hill =

British actress

Juliet Hammond
- Born: Juliet Hammond-Hill; 13 November 1953 (age 72); St Pancras, London, England
- Spouse: Mark Burgin (m. 1977, divorced)
- Partner: Toby Parsons
- Children: 1

Juliet Hammond-Hill (born 13 November 1953) is an English actress, best known for her role in the television series Secret Army (1977–1979). She is also known as Juliet Hammond.

== Early life ==
Hammond-Hill was born in St Pancras, London, the daughter of Peter Hammond Hill, an actor, and Maureen Glynne-West, who had married at Westminster in 1948. She was the eldest in a family of five, with a sister and three brothers.

She trained as an actress at the Webber Douglas Academy and later gained a Post-Graduate Certificate of Education in the performing arts from the University of Greenwich.

== Career ==
Hammond-Hill came to national attention in 1977 as Natalie Chantrens in the BBC television drama series Secret Army (1977–1979), with a central role in all three years of the programme. In 1980, she played Madeline Bray and other parts in the first Royal Shakespeare Company production of The Life and Adventures of Nicholas Nickleby, staged at the Aldwych Theatre.

Several new screen roles came to Hammond-Hill in 1981, including Kessler, a sequel to Secret Army set in about 1980, for which she had to be made to appear more than thirty years older than she was. She was the ominous Miss Hawk in eight episodes of the BBC serial for children Dark Towers, appeared as a German terrorist, Irene Kohl, in the thriller serial Blood Money and had a guest part in Blake's 7, playing the telekinetic Pella in the episode ”Power”. At the end of the year, while pregnant with her daughter, she appeared opposite David Bowie as Emilie in the television version of Bertholt Brecht's Baal, first broadcast in March 1982.

In 1983, Hammond-Hill was cast in an episode of Only Fools and Horses, playing Miranda Davenport, an antique dealer who dates Del Trotter. From then on, she worked as Juliet Hammond, the first such credit being in the television movie The Balance of Nature (1983).

Later work included parts in The Case of Marcel Duchamp (1984), Playing the Ace (1986), and Ping Pong (1986), in which Hammond played the mistress of a Chinese man who has died in mysterious circumstances. Since the 1990s, Hammond has taught drama students and directed plays, mostly in Brighton. She now spells her name Juliette Hammond.

== Personal life ==
In 1977, Hammond-Hill married Mark Burgin in Fulham. A daughter born in 1982 was registered with the names Hammond-Hill and Constantinou. She later lived with Toby Parsons, a construction worker/fine artist, in Burgess Hill, West Sussex.
