= The Face of Evil =

089 – The Face of Evil
- Doctor Who serial

Cast
- Doctor: Tom Baker – Fourth Doctor
- Companion: Louise Jameson – Leela
- Others: David Garfield – Neeva; Victor Lucas – Andor; Brendan Price – Tomas; Leslie Schofield – Calib; Colin Thomas – Sole; Lloyd McGuire – Lugo; Leon Eagles – Jabel; Mike Elles – Gentek; Peter Baldock – Acolyte; Tom Kelly, Brett Forrest – Guards; Rob Edwards, Pamela Salem, Anthony Frieze, Roy Herrick – Xoanon; Harry Fielder – Assassin (uncredited)

Production
- Directed by: Pennant Roberts
- Written by: Chris Boucher
- Script editor: Robert Holmes
- Produced by: Philip Hinchcliffe
- Executive producer: None
- Music by: Dudley Simpson
- Production code: 4Q
- Series: Season 14
- Running time: 4 episodes, 25 minutes each
- First broadcast: 1 January 1977
- Last broadcast: 22 January 1977

Chronology
← Preceded by The Deadly Assassin	Followed by → The Robots of Death

The Face of Evil is the fourth serial of the 14th season of the British science fiction television series Doctor Who, which was first broadcast in four weekly parts on BBC1 from 1 to 22 January 1977. This serial marked the debut of Louise Jameson as companion Leela. It was also the first of three stories written for the series by Chris Boucher and the first of five directed by Pennant Roberts.

In the serial, the powerful split-personality computer Xoanon (played by Tom Baker, Rob Edwards, Pamela Salem, Anthony Frieze, and Roy Herrick) attempts to create two super races from the descendants of a human expedition with eugenics—the savage Sevateem, and the psychic Tesh. The Fourth Doctor (Baker) seeks to repair this personality fault.

The serial is generally well received by reviewers, although Doctor Who fans consider it to be overshadowed by other stories in Season 14. It achieved high ratings, with three episodes attracting over 11 million viewers on first screening.

== Plot ==
The Fourth Doctor, traveling alone in the TARDIS, arrives on a jungle planet and encounters Leela, a savage from the local tribe, the Sevateem. The tribe denounces the Doctor as the Evil One who imprisoned their god Xoanon and keeps him captive with the help of the Tesh. Xoanon speaks to the tribe through their shaman, Neeva. The Sevateem plan to launch an attack on the domain of the Tesh to free their god. Leading the attack is the combative Andor, who suspects Neeva of being a false prophet.

In Neeva's shrine, the Doctor inspects the ancient tribal relics, artifacts from an Earth survey expedition. He finds a transceiver used by Neeva to hear the commands of Xoanon. It speaks with the Doctor's own voice, conveying exhilaration on hearing the Doctor that "At last we are here. At last I shall be free of us."

The Doctor and Leela arrive at a clearing and see a depiction of the Doctor's face carved into a nearby mountain. The Doctor cannot recall why his likeness would be there. They notice a figure in a space suit in the “mouth” entrance and follow it through a projection of a wall. Beyond is a rocket, which the Doctor then recalls as belonging to the Mordee Expedition. The attack of the Sevateem against the Tesh fails badly, killing half the Sevateem, including Andor. The Doctor and Leela meet three representatives of the Tesh, who serve and worship Xoanon. The Doctor deduces both Sevateem and Tesh are descendants of the same crew from the Mordee Expedition, with the Tesh (technicians) involved in the same deadly eugenics exercise as the Sevateem (survey team). The Doctor had once repaired Xoanon but forgot to wipe his personality print from the data core, leaving the computer with a split personality. The Doctor, speaking as Xoanon with the communicator, instructs Neeva to tell the Sevateem survivors to go through the face in the mountain. With Leela keeping guard and holding the Tesh at bay, the Doctor ventures into the computer room of the ship to confront Xoanon. When Xoanon refuses to shut itself down, it channels a vicious mental assault at the Doctor, causing him to collapse.

The new Sevateem attack diverts the Tesh while the Doctor and Leela return to the computer room. Xoanon uses its telepathic abilities to take control of almost everyone, including Leela. Neeva, whose loss of faith in Xoanon renders him able to resist the telepathic commands, fires a disruptor gun at Xoanon's chamber. Xoanon kills Neeva but loses control of its subjects. The Doctor uses the interruption to complete extracting his personality print from Xoanon, which stabilizes Xoanon and knocks the Doctor unconscious.

Two days later, the Doctor wakes up to find himself aboard the spaceship in the care of Leela. She reports that Xoanon has been quiet, and the Doctor interprets this as success. They visit the computer room and find Xoanon's identity and sanity restored. The computer confirms it was running a eugenics experiment and thanks the Doctor for his repair work. The Doctor then contacts the survivors of the Tesh and Sevateem and tells them Xoanon is now cured and able to support their new society. Calib nominates Leela to lead the combined Tesh and Sevateem. Leela instead jumps aboard the TARDIS, despite the protests of the Doctor, and initiates take-off.

== Production ==
In early 1975 writer Chris Boucher submitted a storyline to the Doctor Who production office. Script editor Robert Holmes rejected the script as too short and unsuitable for the programme but was impressed by the imagination of the piece. He invited Boucher to work on another story, which was to be called The Prime Directive, based on an idea by Holmes and producer Philip Hinchcliffe about the breakdown of a society controlled by a central computer. A few months later in October 1975, Boucher delivered the story, now titled The Mentor Conspiracy. Over the next three months Boucher and Holmes worked on the script, retitling it The Tower of Imelo. Hinchcliffe also had some input coming up with the idea that the Doctor had visited the planet before, but his visit had had a negative impact. The episodic scripts were then officially commissioned on 27 January 1976. As the script for the first episode arrived, the name had now changed to The Day God Went Mad. Hinchcliffe disliked the title, not due to religious connotations but more because it was out of keeping with other titles. Boucher later agreed that it was "pretentious".

With the final script delivered in May 1976, production at Ealing Studios began on 20 September with the closing scene of episode one the first to be filmed. This included a model shot of a mountain side which had the Doctor's face carved into it in the style of Mount Rushmore, an idea from Hinchcliffe. The Ealing filming involved scenes set in the alien jungle, which was originally to be recorded in a real forest, but after the success of the previous season's Planet of Evil, it was decided to create a jungle in the film studios. Another filmed sequence for episode one included a scene where the Doctor threatens one of the tribesmen with a knife. Lead actor Tom Baker refused to threaten someone with a weapon and instead substituted it for a jelly baby, much to Hinchcliffe's annoyance who wasn't present at the day's filming. Episode one also introduced the character of Leela, who wasn't intended to be a new companion, but a one-off character with whom the Doctor would interact. The idea was to introduce the new companion in the final story of the season (which later became The Talons of Weng-Chiang) and feature two short-term "companions" in between. Abandoning this plan, the production team decided to make the feisty Leela the new companion instead, thus director Pennant Roberts set about auditioning 26 actresses for the role before finally settling on Louise Jameson. Jameson was surprised at the level of attention she received from the press and the subsequent male interest due to her wearing a skimpy leather costume (designed by John Bloomfield) in the series. The red contact lenses she wore (to turn her blue eyes brown) caused her great discomfort and she was unable to wear them for long periods.

By the time the story went into the television studios, the title of the serial had changed yet again to The Face of Evil. The set designer for the serial was Austin Ruddy in his only Doctor Who outing. Hinchcliffe was impressed with the sets and considers him the best designer after Roger Murray-Leach. In episode three, several actors were employed to take on the voice of Xoanon, including Pamela Salem, who had also auditioned for the role of Leela and would then appear as a cast member in the following serial. Also among these voices was a young boy, Anthony Frieze who was a pupil at the school in which Pennant Roberts' wife worked. Recording for the four episodes at BBC Television Centre began in late September and continued until late October. The final work to be completed on the serial was dubbing in early December 1976.

=== Cast notes ===
Lloyd McGuire later played Generalleutnant Tendexter in the audio play The Architects of History (2012). David Garfield, who played Neeva, played the alien Von Weich who headed the German troops held in the First World War zone in The War Games (1969). Leslie Schofield also appeared in The War Games, in the role of Leroy.

== Broadcast and reception ==
Episode	Title	Run time	Original release date	UK viewers (millions)
1	"Part One"	24:58	1 January 1977	10.7
2	"Part Two"	24:58	8 January 1977	11.1
3	"Part Three"	24:40	15 January 1977	11.3
4	"Part Four"	24:46	22 January 1977	11.7

The story was repeated on BBC Four over the Christmas period 2015, with the four episodes shown over two nights, attracting viewing figures of 0.14m, 0.18m, 0.06m and 0.09m respectively.

Paul Cornell, Martin Day, and Keith Topping wrote of The Face of Evil in The Discontinuity Guide (1995), "A little masterpiece, often undeservedly forgotten by the weight of the surrounding stories. A magnificent cast shake every ounce of subtlety and invention from the script." In The Television Companion (1998), David J. Howe and Stephen James Walker praised the casting and use of the image of the Doctor's face, calling it "unsettling". While it was overall an "impressive tale that manages to intrigue and delight", they noted that the Tesh made "little impression" and the conclusion to the story was "somewhat unlikely". DVD Talk reviewer John Sinnott gave it four out of five stars, praising Baker as "charming and funny" but "not goofy as he is in some stories", describing Leela as a "great companion", and saying "this story in particular works well and has an interesting plot that unfolds nicely", praising its "quite subversive" commentary on religious fervour.

In Doctor Who: The Complete Guide, Mark Campbell awarded it three out of ten, describing it as "a clever story, boringly told. There's too much technobabble and the characters are unsympathetic." In 2010, Patrick Mulkern of Radio Times awarded it two stars out of five, calling it "tired and insipid: no tension, no fear factor... Instead leaden storytelling, uninvolving characters, underdeveloped psychodrama and a dearth of originality. We'd seen invisible monsters in alien jungles at least three times before and numerous computers running amok." He said it had "a handful of intriguing ideas but percolating through four episodes that are stagnant at best and for the most part knuckle-gnawingly dull. The entire production limps along. Even Dudley Simpson's music is uninspired, parping away in the background trying to lift one lifeless tract after another." He described Part Two as "arguably the most abysmally plotted episode of the 1970s so far" but two of the serial's cliffhangers were "saving graces" and he highly praised Jameson's performance, but observed a lack of chemistry between her and Tom Baker and criticised Baker, saying the serial "marks the moment when the egos of the fourth Doctor and of the programme’s emboldened star become untethered". He also said director Pennant Roberts made "an inauspicious debut and [was] incapable of massaging any life into these scripts".

In 2010, Charlie Jane Anders of io9 listed the cliffhanger to the first episode — in which the Doctor's face is revealed to be that of the Evil One — as one of the greatest cliffhangers in the history of Doctor Who.

== Commercial releases ==
=== In print ===
Doctor Who and the Face of Evil
- Author: Terrance Dicks
- Cover artist: Jeff Cummins
- Series: Doctor Who book: Target novelisations
- Release number: 25
- Publisher: Target Books
- Publication date: 19 January 1978
- ISBN: 0-426-20006-3

A novelisation of this serial, written by Terrance Dicks, was published by Target Books in January 1978. The novel explains (as the teleplay does not) that the Doctor's earlier intervention took place very shortly after his previous regeneration (the face on the mountain is clearly modeled after the Fourth Doctor.) At that time he was confused and disoriented, which explains both his mistakes and his forgetting having made them until forcibly reminded.

=== Home media ===
The story was released on VHS in May 1999 and on DVD on 5 March 2012.
