= Tenniel Evans =

British actor (1926–2009)

- Born: Walter Tenniel Evans; 17 May 1926; Nairobi, Kenya
- Died: 10 June 2009 (aged 83); High Wycombe, Buckinghamshire, England
- Occupation: Actor
- Children: 2, including Serena

Walter Tenniel Evans (17 May 1926 – 10 June 2009) was a British actor.

== Early life ==
Walter Tenniel Evans was born on 17 May 1926 in Nairobi, Kenya. His middle name derived from the illustrator John Tenniel, a distant relation.

Evans was educated at the European school in Kitale, Kenya before being awarded a scholarship at Christ's Hospital in Sussex, England, at the age of ten. After leaving school, Evans joined the army. He was subsequently discharged after collapsing on exercise due to a serious heart defect. In 1946, he read German and economics at the University of St Andrews and then went on to study at the Royal Academy of Dramatic Art.

== Career ==
After taking up acting, under the name Tenniel Evans, he first became well known for his long-running roles as Leading Seaman "Taffy" Goldstein and Admiral Ffont-Bittocks (and other occasional characters) in The Navy Lark, a popular BBC radio comedy series (1959–1977), which starred Dennis Price, Leslie Phillips, Jon Pertwee, Stephen Murray, Richard Caldicot, Michael Bates, Ronnie Barker, and Heather Chasen. Pertwee became one of Evans's best friends – Evans encouraged him to audition to play the Third Doctor in Doctor Who, although both were unaware that Pertwee was already being considered for the role; Pertwee subsequently helped Evans to get a role in the Doctor Who story Carnival of Monsters (1973).

Frequently cast as a policeman, a doctor or a priest, Evans appeared in many of the most popular and successful British TV series of the late 20th and early 21st centuries, as well as many one-off programmes, over a period of 44 years. His TV debut was in the series ITV Television Playhouse in 1960; shortly after this he played Jonathan Kail in Tess, the 1960 ITV adaptation of Thomas Hardy's Tess of the D'Urbervilles, which starred Geraldine McEwan and Jeremy Brett.

Among Evans's most notable TV credits are The Forsyte Saga (1967), The Saint (1967), four appearances in The Avengers between 1961 and 1968, episode five of Undermind in 1965, Softly Softly, (1966, 1969), Randall and Hopkirk (1969), A Family at War (1970), Paul Temple (1970, 1971), multiple appearances in Z-Cars between 1963 and 1972, a regular role in Big Breadwinner Hog (1969), The Liver Birds (1972), The Fall and Rise of Reginald Perrin (1976), Yes Minister (1980), Coronation Street (1980), Rumpole of the Bailey (1983), The Citadel (1983), and The Dancing Men (1984), an episode of the Granada series The Adventures of Sherlock Holmes that reunited him with Jeremy Brett.

During 1985 he had a recurring role in the comedy Shine on Harvey Moon. In 1987 he had a recurring role in the children's science-fiction series Knights of God (1987), which is notable for the last appearance on screen by Patrick Troughton. Coincidentally, Evans then took over the role of Perce, the grandfather originally played by Troughton, in the comedy series The Two of Us, following Troughton's sudden death in March 1987.

Evans's other television credits from between the late 1980s and 2004 include Inspector Morse, Lovejoy, September Song, Peak Practice, The Bill, Pie in the Sky, Heartbeat, Hetty Wainthropp Investigates, Casualty, and Dalziel and Pascoe. His final screen appearance was in an episode of the romantic comedy series William and Mary (2004), directed by his son Matthew, which also co-starred Martin Clunes.

Evans made few appearances in films. His most prominent parts were as a murderous teacher in Walk a Crooked Path (1969) and a detective in the crime drama 10 Rillington Place (1971), starring Richard Attenborough as the infamous British serial killer John Christie.

In the 1990s Evans was also featured in Focus on the Family's Radio Theatre programmes, playing Ebenezer Scrooge in A Christmas Carol (1996) and a supporting role as Bishop George Bell in Dietrich Bonhoeffer: The Cost of Freedom (1997).

== Personal life and death ==
Evans was a direct descendant of Isaac Evans, brother of George Eliot (born as Mary Ann Evans).

While in repertory at the Castle theatre in Farnham, Surrey, he met his wife, Evangeline Banks (daughter of the actor Leslie Banks). The couple were married in 1953. In 1955, they had a son, Matthew, a television director. A daughter, Serena Evans, an actress, followed in 1959.

The family lived in London, and then Jordans, Buckinghamshire.

In the 1950s, aside from acting, he worked as a teacher in a private school for boys in Spratton, near Northampton. In 1985 Evans was ordained as a non-stipendiary priest of the Church of England and retired from stage acting, although he continued to perform in TV programmes until shortly before his death.

Evans died on 10 June 2009, age 83.

== Partial filmography ==
=== Film ===
- Only Two Can Play (1962) as Kennedy (uncredited)
- The Wild and the Willing (1962) as Warden (uncredited)
- Walk a Crooked Path (1969) as John Hemming
- 10 Rillington Place (1971) as Police: Det. Sergeant
- Knots (1975) as Tenniel, The Director

=== Television ===
- ITV Television Playhouse (1960)
- Tess (1960) as Jonathan Kail
- The Human Jungle
- Hancock (1963 TV series) ('The Man on the Corner' episode) (1963) as Eric Matthews
- The Forsyte Saga (1967)
- The Saint (1967)
- The Avengers (1961-1968, 4 episodes)
- Undermind (1965, episode 5)
- Softly Softly (1966, 1969)
- Randall and Hopkirk (1969)
- A Family at War (1970)
- Paul Temple (1970, 1971)
- Z-Cars (1963-1972) as various characters
- Big Breadwinner Hog (1969) as Nicholson
- The Liver Birds (1972)
- War and Peace (1972) as Prince Bagration
- Doctor Who (1973, "Carnival of Monsters" serial)
- My Brother's Keeper (1975–1976) as Sergeant Bluett
- The Fall and Rise of Reginald Perrin (1976)
- Yes Minister (1980)
- Coronation Street (1980)
- Lady Killers (1981) – Speed
- Rumpole of the Bailey (1983)
- The Citadel (1983) as Dr Page
- The Adventures of Sherlock Holmes (1984, 1 episode: The Dancing Men)
- Shine on Harvey Moon (1985)
- Knights of God (1987) as Dafydd
- The Two of Us (1987) as Perce
- Inspector Morse
- Lovejoy
- September Song as Sir Edward Parkinson-Lewis
- Peak Practice
- The Bill
- Pie in the Sky
- Heartbeat
- Hetty Wainthropp Investigates
- Casualty
- Dalziel and Pascoe
- William and Mary (2004, 1 episode)

== Radio ==
- The Navy Lark (1959–1977) as Leading Seaman "Taffy" Goldstein / The Admiral / various characters
- A Christmas Carol (1996) as Ebenezer Scrooge
- Dietrich Bonhoeffer: The Cost of Freedom (1997) as Bishop George Bell
