= Patricia Haines =

British actress (1932–1977)

- Haines in the Avengers episode "Who's Who???" (1967)
- Born: 3 February 1932; Sheffield, West Riding of Yorkshire, England
- Died: 25 February 1977 (aged 45); Northampton, Northamptonshire, England
- Occupation: Actress
- Years active: 1959–1976
- Spouses: Michael Caine (m. 1954; div. 1958); Bernard Kay (m. 1963)
- Children: 1

Patricia Haines (3 February 1932 – 25 February 1977) was an English actress, best known for her television work. She was married to Michael Caine from 1954 to 1958.

== Career ==
Haines was born in Sheffield, West Riding of Yorkshire. She is best known for her television work. Her credits include: Dixon of Dock Green, Steptoe and Son, The Avengers (in which she appeared in four episodes: "Girl on the Trapeze" [uncredited], "The Nutshell", "The Master Minds 1965 as Holly Trent", and "Who's Who???"), Danger Man, Public Eye, The Baron, Softly, Softly, Adam Adamant Lives!, The Champions, Sergeant Cork, The Saint, Department S, Randall and Hopkirk (Deceased), Up Pompeii! (as 'Pussius Galoria' in an episode titled "Jamus Bondus"), Emmerdale Farm, Special Branch, The Protectors, and Within These Walls. Her film roles include: The Shakedown (1959), The Night Caller (1965), The Last Shot You Hear, Walk a Crooked Path (both 1969), The Fast Kill, and Virgin Witch (both 1972).

In 1969, Haines guested in the final ever episode of The Saint, (S6, E20 'The World Beater'), as Kay Collingwood, a scheming businesswoman (and rally co-driver) who had previous history and a love-hate relationship with Simon Templar.

She also guested in the classic spy-fi series Department S. She leads a gang planning a daring heist in the 1968 episode The Trojan Tanker.

== Personal life ==
Haines met actor Michael Caine in repertory theatre in Lowestoft, Suffolk, at the Arcadia Theatre (now the East Coast Cinema in London Road South) with Jackson Stanley's 'Standard Players'. They married on 3 April 1954 at Lothingland Register Office before moving on to London. They had a daughter, Dominique (b. 14 August 1957), before divorcing in 1958. Haines married actor Bernard Kay in October 1963.

Haines died of lung cancer, on 25 February 1977, aged 45.

== Theatre ==
- Week commencing 22 May 1953 as Lottie Clegg in Bed, Board & Romance
- W/c 5 October 1953 as Mrs Titterton in Artificial Silk
- W/c 23 November 1953 as Mrs Gulch in The House on the Moor by Jonty Dewhurst
- W/c 30 November 1953 as Lydia Waring in The Loving Elms
- W/c 7 December 1953 as Matron in This Is My Life
- W/c 14 December 1953 as Lola Salvani in Piccadilly Alibi by Guy Paxton & Edward V. Hoille
- W/c 21 December 1953 as Olivier Meldon in But Once a Year
- W/c 28 December 1953 as Bubbles Merton in Charley's Uncle by Dennis Staveley
- W/c 4 January 1954 as Diana Wayne in Peril on the Pier
- W/c 18 January 1954 as Joanna Cooper in The Feminine Touch by Wilfred Massey
- W/c 1 February 1954 as Dr Harrington in The 10.5 Never Stops by John Essex
- W/c 22 February 1954 as Fenella in This Was a Woman by Joan Morgan

== Filmography ==
- The Shakedown (1959) – Modelling Student (uncredited)
- Clue of the Silver Key (1961) – Policewoman
- The Night Caller (1965) – Ann Barlow
- The Baron (1966) – Helga Sorenson
- Department S (1968) - Veronica Bray
- The Last Shot You Hear (1969) – Anne Nordeck
- Walk a Crooked Path (1969) – Nancy Coleman
- Virgin Witch (1972) – Sybil Waite
- The Fast Kill (1972) – Victoria Leach

== Television ==
Year	Title	Role	Notes
1960–61	The World of Tim Frazer	Barbara Day	7 episodes
1973	Crown Court	Adelaide Vincent (Maiden Witch)	3 episodes titled "To suffer a witch"
