= Hetty Baynes =

British actress

Hetty Baynes-Russell
- Born: Henrietta Sara Louise Baynes; 16 August 1956 (age 70); Bournemouth, Hampshire, England
- Occupation: Actress
- Years active: 1968–present
- Spouse: Ken Russell (m. 1992; div. 1999)
- Children: 1

Henrietta Sara Louise Baynes (born 16 August 1956) is an English film, television and theatre actress. She began her career in ballet by training from the age of 10 at the Royal Ballet School and made her professional debut, at the age of 12, in Rudolf Nureyev's The Nutcracker followed by The Sleeping Beauty at the Royal Opera House, Covent Garden. In her mid-teens she moved from dance to acting.

She began her acting career at 17, as an acting ASM in repertory theatre. She was married to film director Ken Russell from 1992 to 1999; they had one son.

== Early life and education ==
Baynes was born in Boscombe Hospital, Bournemouth, the daughter of aeronautical engineer Leslie Baynes, who designed what is believed to be the oldest flying glider in the United Kingdom, and Margot (née Findlay). Baynes attended the Elmhurst Ballet School in Camberley in Surrey, where a contemporary was the actress Laura Hartong. Hetty graduated with a Creative Writing MA in 2015 from Birkbeck College London University, where she also took a BA in Philosophy in the late 1980s.

== Career ==
=== Acting career ===
Her stage career has involved many roles: in 1979 in John Osborne's Inadmissible Evidence at the Royal Court Theatre, and in 1984, a comic performance alongside Maureen Lipman and Lionel Jeffries in the Theatre of Comedy's See How They Run. In 1991, she appeared with Edward Fox, in The Philanthropist at Wyndham's Theatre and in 1997, she appeared as Lady Fidget in William Wycherley's The Country Wife . Her most recent stage performance was in 2004, as Shirley in Revelations by Stephen Lowe at the Hampstead Theatre.

During her career she has received three best actress nominations for her performances: in 1991, as Rita in Henrik Ibsen's Little Eyolf (1992 Offie, as Maddy in Michael Wall's Women Laughing (Manchester Evening News Awards) and as Marilyn Monroe in Marilyn Bowering's Anyone Can See I Love You (Sony and Prix Italia Awards).

Baynes has also appeared on television including, in 1976, as a missing underage girl in Z-Cars, in 1981, Agatha Christie's The Seven Dials Mystery, in 1985, with Pauline Collins and Michael Gambon in The Tropical Moon Over Dorking, in 1990, as the wife of Stephen Fry in Simon Gray's Old Flames, in 1993, as Hilda in Ken Russell's Lady Chatterley’s Lover and in The Secret Life of Sir Arnold Bax. She appeared as Vera Rowley in the BBC series The Hour in 2011, and was also in BBC1's The Casual Vacancy in 2015.

== Art and paintings ==
She studied a fine art BA degree at Central St Martins. She had an exhibition at the Strand Gallery, London entitled Betsy and Blapsy.

== Personal life ==
She was married to film director Ken Russell from 1992 to 1999; their son, Rex, was born on 7 January 1993 and is a film director.

== Selected theatre appearances ==
- The Country Wife (Plymouth & tour)
- The Heidi Chronicles
- The Passing Out Parade
- The Admirable Crichton (Greenwich Theatre)
- Women Laughing - Best Actress nomination for the Manchester Evening News Awards (Manchester Royal Exchange)
- The Philanthropist (Wyndham Theatre)
- Little Eyolf - Best Actress nomination for the Fringe Awards (Bird's Nest)
- Hand Over Fist (Watermill)
- See How They Run
- Theatre of Comedy (Shaftesbury Theatre)
- Buglar Boy (Traverse Theatre, Edinburgh Festival)
- Happy Event
- The Reluctante Debutant
- Hay Fever (Windsor)
- Le Bourgeois Gentilhomme (Lyric, Belfast)
- Chorus Girls (Stratford East)
- Suddenly Last Summer
- Three Sisters (Thorndike Theatre)
- Inadmissible Evidence (Royal Court)
- Othello (Ludlow Festival) and
- The Merry Wives of Windsor
- On the Rocks (Mermaid Theatre).

== Selected television appearances ==
- Doctors (2020) as Yvonne Wrigley
- Father Brown (2017) as Lucia Morell, episode 5.5 "The Hand of Lucia"
- Secret Army
- My Family
- Cutting It
- Cor Blimey
- The Bill - A Time to Kill
- Jonathan Creek - Miracle in Crooked Lane
- A Touch of Frost - Keys to the Car
- Ken Russell’s Treasure Island
- The Vet
- Fall of Eagles
- Alice in Russialand
- Privateer 2 : The Darkening
- The Secret Life of Sir Arnold Bax
- Minder
- Old Flames
- Christmas Present
- London's Burning
- Harry’s Kingdom
- Bergerac
- The Piglet Files
- Drummonds
- Tropical Moon Over Dorking
- Wynne & Penkovsky
- Chance in a Million
- Dickens of London
- Running Scared
- Charters & Caldicott
- Marjorie and Men
- Crime Writers
- Just William
- Good Companions
- Winter Sunlight
- Agatha Christie's The Seven Dials Mystery
- Dombey and Son
- Sense and Sensibility
- Nicholas Nickleby
- Benefit of the Doubt
- The Last Song
- Hunchback of Notre Dame
- Renoir My Father
- Red Dwarf - Dimension Jump
- Footballers' Wives
- The Hour
- The Casual Vacancy
- Rumpole of the Bailey: Series 2, Episode 3, "Rumpole and the Show Folk" (first aired 12 June 1979), under the name Henrieta Baynes, as Christine Hope
- Keep It in the Family: Series 3, Episode 1, "Splitting Headaches" (first aired 1 September 1981), under the name Henrieta Baynes, as a secretary

== Selected radio performances ==
- Far from the Madding Crowd (4 May – 8 June 1990)
- Rumpole and the Vanishing Juror (8 October 2003)
- Tim Merryman's Days of Clover
- John Naismith's A Memory Longer Than Death
- Suzy in BBC Radio 4's drama series Citizens (1987–92)

== Selected film appearances ==
- The Balance of Nature (1983) as Blanche
- Coping with Cupid
- The Insatiable Mrs Kirsch (which she co-wrote with Ken Russell)
- Mindbender, The Life of Uri Geller
- Herbert Ross's Nijinsky
- Ken Russell's Lady Chatterley
- Blanche Dumas from B to Z
