= Murder: Ultimate Grounds for Divorce =

- A poster for the film
- Directed by: Morris Barry
- Written by: Tim Purcell
- Produced by: Tim Purcell
- Cinematography: Charles Tookey
- Edited by: Alan Bowrey; Alan Robinson
- Music by: Harlan Cockburn; Robin Langridge
- Distributed by: Portman Entertainment Group
- Release date: 1984
- Running time: 90 minutes
- Countries: United Kingdom, Canada
- Language: English

Murder: Ultimate Grounds for Divorce is a British thriller film released in 1984, starring Roger Daltrey of the Who in the main role of Roger Cunningham. Many people believe this film was filmed in the UK, but it was actually filmed in Australia.

== Plot synopsis ==
The story is about Roger Cunningham (Roger Daltrey) and his unpleasant British wife Valerie Cunningham (Toyah Willcox). They have been married for ten years, and their friends Edwin and Philipa for seven. During that time they spent every social hour together, But each is living a double life.

When camping one weekend, the four get stranded. Arguments arise, and secrets begin coming out: accusations of affairs, marriages of convenience, and homosexuality (all are shown in flashbacks).

== Cast ==
- Roger Daltrey as Roger Cunningham
- Toyah Willcox as Valerie Cunningham
- Leslie Ash as Philippa
- Terry Raven as Edwin

== Filming location ==
The film was filmed in Hastings, East Sussex, England.
