= Diamonds (British TV series) =

- Written by: John Brason
- Starring: John Stride; Hildegard Neil; Simon Ward
- Theme music composer: Jack Purnell; David Lindup
- Country of origin: United Kingdom
- Original language: English
- No. of seasons: 1
- No. of episodes: 13

Production
- Executive producer: David Reid
- Producer: John Cooper
- Running time: 50 minutes
- Production company: ATV

Original release
- Network: ITV
- Release: 9 September – 2 December 1981

Diamonds is a British television drama produced by ATV for ITV in 1981.

Created by John Brason, the series was set amongst the exclusive world of diamond merchants, Coleman and Sons, in London and lasted for thirteen episodes.

== Cast ==
- John Stride as Frank Coleman
- Hildegard Neil as Margaret Coleman
- Simon Ward as Bernard de Haan
- Doris Hare as Dora Coleman
- Ian McCulloch as Barry Coleman
- Norman Wooland as Joseph Coleman
- Shirley Cain as Catherine Coleman
- William Relton as Terry Coleman
- Briony McRoberts as Elaine Coleman
- Michael Culver as David Kremer
- John Barrard as Mordecai Kremer
- Valerie Testa as Jennifer Reece
- Mark Kingston as Tom Fabricius

== Episodes ==
No.	Title	Directed by	Written by	Original release date
1	"Rough Stone"	John Cooper	John Brason	9 September 1981
2	"A Debt To Be Paid"	John Cooper	John Brason	16 September 1981
3	"The Kremer Claim"	John Cooper	John Brason	23 September 1981
4	"Gamblers"	John Cooper	John Brason	30 September 1981
5	"Homecoming"	John Cooper	John Brason	7 October 1981
6	"The Other Kind"	John Cooper	John Brason	14 October 1981
7	"A Taste of the Orient"	Don Leaver	John Brason	21 October 1981
8	"Middle Game"	Don Leaver	John Brason	28 October 1981
9	"Implosion"	David Foster	John Brason	4 November 1981
10	"My End is My Beginning"	David Foster	John Brason	11 November 1981
11	"Consider Thy Job, Servant"	John Cooper	John Brason	18 November 1981
12	"House of Cards"	John Cooper	John Brason	25 November 1981
13	"Ace in the Hole"	John Cooper	John Brason	2 December 1981
