= Lady Chatterley (TV serial) =

- Based on: Lady Chatterley's Lover by D. H. Lawrence
- Written by: Ken Russell; Michael Haggiag
- Directed by: Ken Russell
- Starring: Joely Richardson; Sean Bean; James Wilby; Hetty Baynes; Shirley Anne Field
- Composer: Jean-Claude Petit
- Country of origin: United Kingdom
- Original language: English
- No. of series: 1
- No. of episodes: 4

Production
- Executive producers: Tom Donald; Robert Haggiag; Barry Hanson; Johan Eliasch
- Producer: Michael Haggiag
- Cinematography: Robin Vidgeon
- Editors: Mick Audsley; Peter Davies; Alan Mackay; Xavier Russell
- Running time: 55 minutes
- Production company: London Film Productions in association with Global Arts for BBC

Original release
- Network: BBC1
- Release: 6 June – 27 June 1993

Lady Chatterley is a 1993 BBC television serial starring Sean Bean and Joely Richardson. It is an adaptation of D. H. Lawrence's 1928 novel Lady Chatterley's Lover, first broadcast on BBC1 in four 55-minute episodes between 6 and 27 June 1993. A young woman's husband returns wounded after the First World War. Facing a life with a husband now incapable of sexual activity she begins a passionate affair with the groundskeeper. The film reflects Lawrence's focus not only on casting away sexual taboos, but also the examination of the British class system.

== Cast ==
- Joely Richardson - Lady Chatterley
- Sean Bean - Mellors
- James Wilby - Sir Clifford Chatterley
- Shirley Anne Field - Mrs Bolton
- Hetty Baynes - Hilda
- Ken Russell - Sir Michael Reid, Lady Chatterley's father

== Reception ==
The show had an audience of over 12 million.

Donald Liebenson, a Chicago-based film critic said "Those who believe British miniseries to be too proper and corseted may want to make an exception for Ken Russell's 1992, four-hour BBC adaptation of D.H. Lawrence's scandalous novel...The production is impeccably mounted--no pun intended--and the performances (particularly by the daring Ms. Richardson) impassioned."

In September 1994, Adrian Martin said "Russell brings not a skerrick of art or craft to this project."

Dennis Lim of The New York Times called it "a sudsy...mini-series".

The Independent said "What actually happened was perilously close to cartoon."

In 2005, the BBC reported that the show's dramatisation "toned down" the book's "more explicit scenes".

== Home media ==
The series has been released on VHS and DVD.
