= Dorothy Fields Forever =

Dorothy Fields Forever is a musical revue featuring the lyrics and life of Dorothy Fields and the music of Jerome Kern, Jimmy McHugh, Arthur Schwartz, Albert Hague, Sigmund Romberg and Cy Coleman.

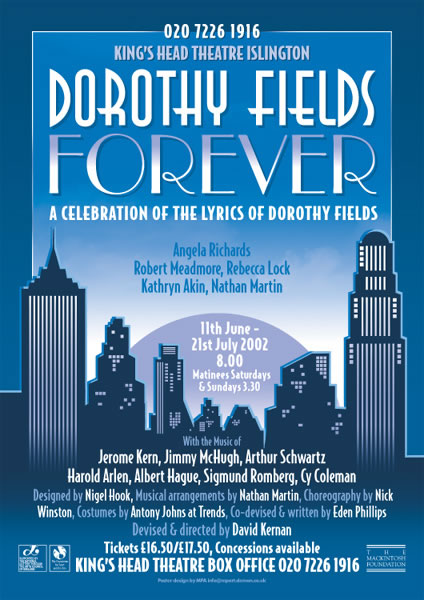
Poster advertising Dorothy Fields Forever, The King's Head Theatre, Islington, London 2002

It was devised and written by Eden Phillips, and co-devised and directed by David Kernan, with musical arrangements by Jason Carr and Nathan Martin. Choreography was by Nick Winston and the musical director was Nathan Martin.

== History ==
The show originated at the Theatre Museum, Covent Garden, London in December 2001. It transferred to Jermyn Street Theatre in February 2002 and then to the King's Head Theatre Islington for three runs between June and November 2002.

== Cast ==
Angela Richards played Dorothy Fields throughout. Narrating, singing, dancing and playing other characters in her life were: Susannah Fellows, Harry Burton, Laura Michelle Kelly, Darren Carnall (Theatre Museum); Daniel Crossley, Andrew Halliday, Rebecca Lock, Kathryn Akin, Stori James, Robert Meadmore, Nick Winston (Jermyn Street and/or King's Head.)

== Reception ==
Among the reviews: "an utterly delightful revue" Variety Magazine; "this joyful celebration of Fields' songs and a talented young quartet of singer/dancers performs so dazzlingly that the audience yells for more. I shall go again at least twice" The Times; "Ms Richards gives a master-class in effortless style; I could have sat and listened to her all night" The Daily Mail.

== Songs ==
=== Act One ===
- I Can't Give You Anything But Love (music, Jimmy McHugh)
- On the Sunny Side of the Street (McHugh)
- Blue Again (McHugh)
- I'm in the Mood for Love (McHugh)
- I Won't Dance/Never Gonna Dance (Jerome Kern)
- Bojangles of Harlem (Kern)
- A Fine Romance (Kern)
- Remind Me (Kern)
- The Way You Look Tonight (Kern)
- A Lady Needs a Change (Kern)
- Pink Taffeta Sample Size 10 (Cy Coleman)
- Close As Pages in a Book (Sigmund Romberg)
- Make the Man Love Me (Arthur Schwartz)
- He Had Refinement (Schwartz)
- Lottie Gibson Specialty (Schwartz)
- The Uncle Sam Rag (Albert Hague)
- ‘Erbie Fitch's Twitch (Hague)
- Where Am I Going? (Coleman)

=== Act Two ===
- There's Gotta Be Something Better/ My Personal Property/
- It's a Nice Face/I'm a Brass Band/ The Rhythm of Life (Coleman)
- If My Friends Could See Me Now (Coleman)
- Soliloquy (Coleman)
- Welcome To Holiday Inn (Coleman)
- I'm Way Ahead (Coleman)
- Nobody Does It Like Me (Coleman)
- I Must Have That Man/Don't Blame Me (McHugh)
- I Can't Give You Anything but Love/On The Sunny Side of The Street reprise (McHugh)
- More People Like You (Coleman)
- It's Not Where You Start (Coleman)
- Finale medley: I Feel a Song Coming On/Exactly Like You/You Couldn't Be Cuter/Big Spender/Lovely To Look At/I Love to Cry at Weddings/Pick Yourself Up/It's Not Where You Start/The Rhythm of Life

All lyrics by Dorothy Fields.
