= Night Caller from Outer Space =

1965 British film by John Gilling

- Lobby card for US release
- Directed by: John Gilling
- Written by: Frank Crisp (novel); Jim O'Connolly (screenplay)
- Produced by: Ronald Liles
- Starring: John Saxon; Maurice Denham; Patricia Haines; Alfred Burke; Warren Mitchell
- Cinematography: Stephen Dade
- Edited by: Philip Barnikel
- Music by: John Gregory (composed and directed by)
- Production company: Armitage Film Productions Ltd.
- Distributed by: Butcher's Film Service (UK)
- Release date: 1965
- Running time: 85 minutes
- Country: United Kingdom
- Language: English

Night Caller from Outer Space (also known as The Night Caller and Blood Beast from Outer Space) is a British 1965 science fiction film directed by John Gilling and starring John Saxon, Maurice Denham and Patricia Haines. It was written by Jim O'Connolly based on Frank Crisp's 1961 novel The Night Callers. A colourised version of the film was released in 2011.

== Plot ==
Scientist Dr Morley and his American associate Jack Costain detect a meteorite heading to Earth. After determining where the meteorite has crashed, they and their aides investigate a meteorite in the British countryside, discovering that it is an alien device from Ganymede, a moon of Jupiter. The device is in the shape of a small sphere.

While working nights at the lab, secretary Ann Barlow sees something moving in the lab. Dr Morley attempts to communicate with the creature, but he is killed. When the creature escapes the lab, Costain begins to track it.

Shortly thereafter, teenage girls begin to go missing after answering an advertisement in Bikini Girl magazine. It turns out the alien wants to use women from Earth for breeding.

== Cast ==
- John Saxon as Dr. Jack Costain
- Maurice Denham as Dr. Morley
- Patricia Haines as Ann Barlow
- Alfred Burke as Detective Supintendent Hartley
- John Carson as the Major
- Warren Mitchell as Reg Lilburn
- Marianne Stone as Madge Lilburn
- Stanley Meadows as Detective Tom Grant
- Aubrey Morris as Thorburn
- Ballard Berkeley as Commander Savage
- Geoffrey Lumsden as Colonel Davy
- Tom Gill as Police Commissioner's secretary
- Jack Watson as Sergeant Hawkins
- Barbara French as Joyce Malone

== Production ==
It was the first science fiction film featuring John Saxon.

== Music ==
UK prints of the film feature Alan Haven's version of the hit instrumental "Image" as the theme played over the opening credits. Export prints feature a lounge number titled "The Night Caller" written by Albert Hague and sung by Mark Richardson.

== Critical reception ==
The Monthly Film Bulletin wrote: "An uncommonly intelligent little science fiction thriller, competently mounted and convincingly scripted. The fantasy of the first half comes off better than the more straightforward investigations towards the end, and the finale is something of an anticlimax. But the acting is always more than adequate, and Patricia Haines in particular manages to bring some character to the stock figure of the female scientist."

Stuart Byron of Variety wrote that "it is simply too well-made for its own commercial good" and that it was "far above average of its kind, but it eschews a standard action-adventure climax in favor of a 'philosophical' one." He noted that audiences at a 42nd Street screening showed their displeasure with the film "quite volubly".

Leonard Maltin called it a "well-done sci-fi thriller" and gave it two-and-a-half stars out of four.

Creature Feature gave the movie 2 out of 5 stars, liking the direction.

TV Guide gave the movie 2 out of five stars, finding both the script and production values worthwhile.

The Radio Times Guide to Films gave the film 2/5 stars, writing: "You are an alien sent to Earth to find women to help repopulate your planet. How would you go about recruiting them? A wanted advert in Bikini Girl magazine, of course." The reviewer went on to call the film a "cheerful piece of nonsense."

== Home release ==
It was released on DVD on 22 December 2011.
