= Leslie Ash =

English actress (born 1960)

- Born: 19 February 1960 (age 66); Henley-on-Thames, Oxfordshire, England
- Education: Italia Conti Academy of Theatre Arts
- Occupation: Actress
- Years active: 1964–present
- Spouse: Lee Chapman (m. 1988)
- Children: 2

Leslie Ash (born 19 February 1960) is an English actress. She is best known for her roles in Quadrophenia (1979), ITV series C.A.T.S. Eyes (1985–1987), the BBC sitcom Men Behaving Badly (1992–1998), drama Where the Heart Is (2000–2003), and medical drama Holby City (2009–2010).

== Early career ==
Ash was born in Henley-on-Thames, Oxfordshire, and first appeared on British television in 1964 at the age of four asking "Mummy, why are your hands so soft?" in an advertisement for the washing-up product Fairy Liquid. She was educated at the Italia Conti Academyl and then started a career as a fashion model, appearing on the cover of a number of teen magazines, including Pink and Jackie.

Having appeared with her sister Debbie in the 1978 British slapstick comedy Rosie Dixon – Night Nurse, her first major film role was playing the romantic lead in Quadrophenia in 1979. In 1980, Ash appeared in the Iron Maiden music video "Women in Uniform" and one of the two Dire Straits music videos of "Tunnel of Love". In 1982, she played the role of a fast food chef in the fifth series of Shelley in the episode entitled "When the Chip Hits the Fan", and appeared opposite Joan Collins in the film Nutcracker. Also in 1982, Ash appeared in a TV adaptation of Outside Edge. In 1983, she had the starring role in The Balance of Nature, a film about a Cockney girl from a tower block with aspirations to win the Miss United Kingdom competition. The same year, she played Julie Morgan, alias Juletta Shane, in Curse of the Pink Panther, and also appeared opposite Nicky Henson as Nancy in the ITV situation comedy The Happy Apple, playing a secretary whose opinions successfully reflected public opinion. She then played a regular role in crime series C.A.T.S. Eyes. From 1983 until 1987, she was a co-presenter on the Channel 4 music programme The Tube alongside Jools Holland and Paula Yates. In 1984, she appeared opposite Roger Daltrey and former Quadrophenia co-star Toyah Willcox in the thriller Murder: Ultimate Grounds for Divorce, and played Carol Landau in the 1985 comedy film Shadey, directed by Philip Saville.

In 1987, Ash appeared in the first episode of the third series of the ITV comedy series Home to Roost, entitled "Human Interest", where she played the role of the flamboyant cleaner, Susie Perkins.

Ash is also well known for playing Deborah (Debs), the upstairs tenant and love interest for Neil Morrissey, in the situation comedy Men Behaving Badly. One of the four regulars, she continued in the role for six seasons. She subsequently acted in BBC police drama Merseybeat and the ITV drama Where the Heart Is.

In 1996, during her time on Men Behaving Badly, Leslie released a single "Tell Him" with co-star Caroline Quentin, under the name of Quentin & Ash. It reached number 25 in the UK singles chart.

== Later work ==
Ash appeared in BBC Radio 4's comic radio series, Vent (2007), alongside Neil Pearson, Fiona Allen and Josie Lawrence.

In May 2008, Ash worked with Transparent Television to make a documentary about the unregulated cosmetic beauty industry while exploring her own experiences. The programme, Leslie Ash: Face to Face, was broadcast on ITV on 23 September 2008.

In 2009, Ash appeared on daytime TV panel programme Loose Women to discuss her new role in Holby City and her previous health problems. Leslie reappeared on Loose Women on 17 February 2012, where she discussed her stage tour of All the Single Ladies.

In 2014, Leslie was a contestant on the BBC programme Celebrity Masterchef. In 2020, she appeared opposite many of her Quadrophenia co-stars in the unofficial semi-sequel To Be Someone. In 2021, it was announced that she would be reprising her role as Vanessa Lytton in an episode of Holby City's sister series Casualty. In the same year, she also appeared in an episode of the BBC soap opera Doctors as Mary McRae.

Her book, My Life Behaving Badly: The Autobiography, was published in 2007.

== Personal life ==
Ash is married to former footballer Lee Chapman, and they have two sons. Her sister is former Hot Gossip dancer Debbie Ash. They appeared together as sisters in Rosie Dixon – Night Nurse.

=== Health ===
Ash contracted toxoplasmosis two months into her pregnancy while in France, where it is more common than in the United Kingdom. She told the BBC that she wished to raise awareness of the issue in Britain.

Ash was hospitalised at the Chelsea and Westminster Hospital in April 2004 after suffering two cracked ribs. She was discharged after a few days, but was readmitted after losing all feeling in her legs. In June 2004 while she was still in hospital, it was announced that a Staphylococcus aureus infection might have rendered her permanently unable to walk.

In January 2007 Ash confirmed she was suing the hospital. Papers lodged at the High Court asserted that Ash would never return to active TV roles. The hospital admitted breach of duty over part of her treatment but denied responsibility for the extent of her injuries and in January 2008 paid out a record £5 million compensation in an out-of-court settlement. Steve Walker, chief executive of the NHS Litigation Authority, said the payout set a new record for compensation following a hospital-acquired infection. The previous highest amount was £500,000. The payment was justified by the NHS compensation body as being "because of the amount Leslie was earning at the time she fell ill and takes into account how much she might have earned in the future".

=== Lip implants ===
In her 30s, Ash had a collagen injection to "plump up" her lips. When she was 40 she decided to repeat the procedure with the same plastic surgeon, the mother of a Venezuelan friend. In the second procedure, liquid silicone was injected resulting in extreme swelling of her lips, a condition dubbed as "trout pout" in the press. Subsequent medical analysis showed that the silicone had set and the condition is permanent. During this time Ash starred in a series of advertisements for the DIY chain Homebase (again, with Neil Morrissey) and starred in Merseybeat, which evoked further ridicule from the media about her appearance.

Ash has since spoken out about the press ridicule she received as a result of her botched implants, commenting: "If I'd lost a leg in a car crash, people wouldn't have felt able to take the mickey out of me so mercilessly ... People don't laugh at Heather Mills because she lost a leg."

== News of the World legal action ==
Ash and Chapman sued the News of the World for breach of privacy over suspicions that their voicemails, and those of their two sons, were illegally accessed by private investigator Glenn Mulcaire. They wrote to the police over their suspicions, and the police informed them that there were four pieces of paper referring to Ash in Mulcaire's notebooks, and five items relating to Chapman. There were further items relating to their children.

In August 2011, Ash and Chapman settled a claim against the paper and Mulcaire for an undisclosed sum and received an apology. They planned to take action against other newspapers.

== Filmography ==
Key
†	Denotes works that have not yet been released

=== Film ===
Year	Film	Role	Notes
1978	Rosie Dixon – Night Nurse	Natalie Dixon	
1979	Quadrophenia	Steph	
1982	La Ronde	The Prostitute	TV film
1982	Nutcracker	Sharon	
1982	Outside Edge	Sharon	TV film
1982	Waveband		Short film
1983	Dead on Time	Girl in Café	Short film
1983	Curse of the Pink Panther	Juleta Shane	
1983	The Balance of Nature	Dawn Winch	TV film
1984	Murder: Ultimate Grounds for Divorce	Philippa	
1985	Shadey	Carol Landau	
1986	The Wanderers	Sally	
1988	Natural Causes	Angie	TV film
2004	Monkey Trousers	Various	TV film
2021	To Be Someone	Judy	
2021	Ruth	Jennifer	Short film
2022	TWELVE	Martha	Short film
TBC	† Gin and It	Theresa	TV film

=== Television ===
Year	Title	Role	Notes
1974	Chico the Rainmaker	Jill Page	Series regular; 7 episodes
1980	The Gentle Touch	Maureen	Episode: Hammer
1981	Plays for Pleasure	Ros Bedwell	Episode: Cupid's Darts
1981	World's End	Ring-a-Ding	Recurring role; 2 episodes
1981-82	Seconds Out	Hazel	Recurring role; 5 episodes
1982	Holding the Fort	Cyd	Episode: News from the Front
1982	Shelley	Girl with Baby	Episode: Credit Where Credit's Due
1982	Shelley	Patsi	Episode: When the Chip Hits the Fan
1983	The Happy Apple	Nancy Gray	Series regular; 7 episodes
1983	The Two Ronnies	Melissa Winthrop	Episode: Series 10, Episode 1
1985-87	C.A.T.S. Eyes	Fred Smith	Series regular; 30 episodes
1987	Home to Roost	Susie Perkins	Episode: Human Interest
1987	The Marksman	Hazel	Miniseries; 3 episodes
1989	The Bill	Lorraine Gaynor	Episode: Traffic
1991	Perfect Scoundrels	Daisy Garland	Episode: My Fair Daisy
1992	Love Hurts	Val	Recurring role; 2 episodes
1992	Haggard	Dickon	Episode: Wicked Lady
1992-98	Men Behaving Badly	Deborah Burton	Series regular; 42 episodes
1993	Stay Lucky	Jo Blake	Recurring role; 3 episodes
1997	Bugs	Kitty McHaig	Recurring role; 2 episodes
2000	Full Mountie	Flight Attendant	Episode: Series 1, Episode 2
2000-03	Where the Heart Is	Karen Buckley	Series regular; 40 episodes
2003	Judge John Deed	Jan Dobbs	Episode: Judicial Review
2003-04	Merseybeat	Inspector Charlie Eden	Series regular; 13 episodes
2009-10	Holby City	Vanessa Lytton	Recurring role; 18 episodes
2020	Broke	Sonia	Series regular; 6 episodes
2020	Trickster	Sonia	Series regular; 6 episodes
2020	Nothing to Declare	Clare's Mum	Recurring role; 2 episodes
2021	Doctors	Mary McRae	Episode: A Grave Affair
2021	Casualty	Vanessa Lytton	Episode: Series 35, Episode 26
2022	Sky Comedy Shorts	Lynn	Episode: Past Caring
2025	Celebrity Antiques Road Trip	Self	Series 13: 6. Leslie Ash v Phil Daniels
2026	The Last Leg	Self	Series 34: 1. Cricket bowling machine operator

=== Music Videos ===
Year	Artist	Song	Role	Notes
1980	Dire Straits	"Tunnel of Love"	Heroine	Version 2 only
1980	Iron Maiden	"Women in Uniform"	Sargeant Anita/Psychiatric nurse	
1996	Quentin & Ash	"Tell Him"	Herself	One-off single with Caroline Quentin
