= Paul Annett =

English film and television director (1937–2017)

Paul Annett in 1974.

Paul Anthony Annett (19 February 1937 – 11 December 2017) was an English film and television director.

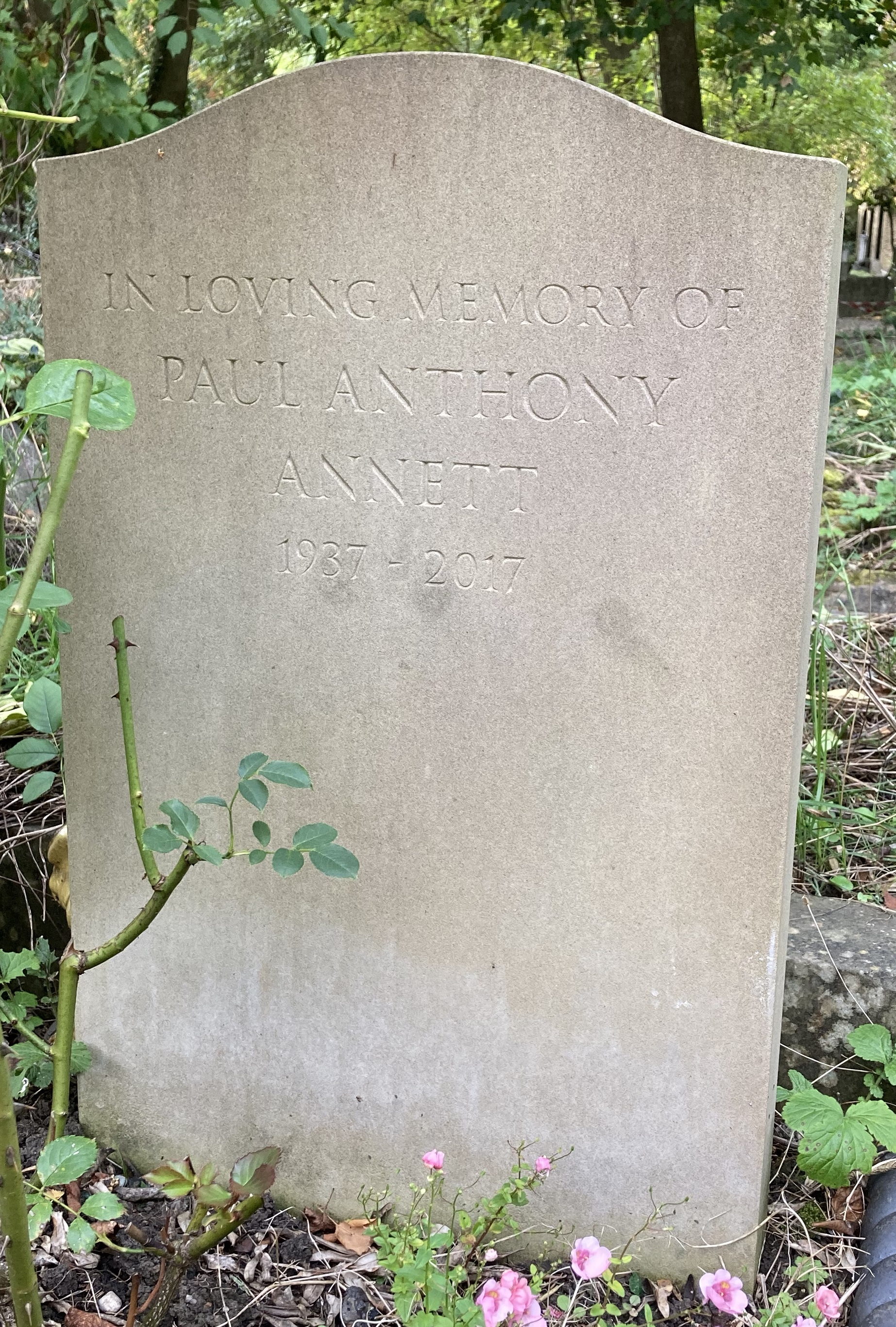
Grave of Paul Annett in Highgate Cemetery

== Biography ==
Annett directed numerous television programmes including Poldark and EastEnders. He died on 11 December 2017, at the age of 80, and was buried on the eastern side of Highgate Cemetery. His daughter is actress Chloë Annett . He was married to Margo Andrew. Paul was born in London.

== Films directed ==
- The Beast Must Die, 1974
- Never Never Land, 1980
- The Girl from Mani, 1986

== Television directed ==
- Poldark (first series)
- Grange Hill
- Secret Army
- Within These Walls
- The Adventure of Sherlock Holmes (three episodes)
- Emmerdale
- Brookside 1997
- Byker Grove
- EastEnders
