= 13 May 1945 German deserter execution =

Illegal execution of German deserters by German officers

The 13 May 1945 German deserter execution occurred five days after the capitulation of Nazi Germany along with the Wehrmacht armed forces in World War II, when an illegal court martial, composed of the captured and disarmed German officers kept under Allied guard in Amsterdam, Netherlands, imposed a death sentence upon two former German deserters from the Kriegsmarine, Bruno Dorfer and Rainer Beck (sailor), a half-Jewish conscript who had deserted to avoid being killed. The show trial occurred in an abandoned Ford Motor Company assembly plant outside Amsterdam, which at the time was a prisoner-of-war camp run by the Canadian Army.

The Nazi German prisoners of war formed a firing squad which carried out the sentence. They were supplied with captured German rifles and a three-ton truck by the Seaforth Highlanders of Canada, and escorted by a platoon of Canadian soldiers led by Captain Robert K. Swinton.

Under a dubious interpretation of international law, Canadian military authorities permitted a continuation of the German military structure after the demise of the Third Reich. German assistance was indispensable in the disarmament, concentration, and evacuation of the German armed forces within Holland. Unfortunately, disinterested Canadian military authorities also left the German military in control of order and discipline. German commanders and military judges applied a military law warped by National Socialism. — Chris Madsen, Victims of Circumstance.^{[p.109]}

In an analysis of the incident the historian Chris Madsen notes that the Canadian military authorities felt obliged to work with their German counterparts, faced with the huge task of disarming and evacuating the German armed forces in the Netherlands, under discipline, and without disorder. As a matter of mutual convenience the German command hierarchy was allowed to continue to function following the surrender, and this included the sentencing and execution of individuals such as Dorfer and Beck under the Allies.

== In popular culture ==
- The incident provided much of the material for the final episode of Secret Army, a BBC drama series about the Belgian resistance in World War II.
- The Italian-Yugoslavian film The Fifth Day of Peace (Italian title: Dio è con noi; 1969) dramatised the story of the two German sailors.
- The 2006 Dutch film Black Book by director Paul Verhoeven includes the execution of a major character which is directly (but loosely) based on this incident.
