= The Fourth Arm (TV series) =

- Genre: Drama
- Created by: John Brason; Gerard Glaister
- Written by: Michael J. Bird; John Brason
- Directed by: Peter Duguid; Andrew Morgan
- Starring: Paul Shelley; Philip Latham; Rob Edwards; Dean Harris
- Country of origin: United Kingdom
- Original language: English
- No. of series: 1
- No. of episodes: 12

Production
- Producer: Gerard Glaister

Original release
- Network: BBC1
- Release: 7 January – 25 March 1983

The Fourth Arm is a British television twelve-part series produced by the BBC and transmitted in 1983.

The twelve-part serial dealt with secret agents parachuted into occupied Europe during the Second World War, following their progress through initial recruitment and training, and finally their first mission in enemy territory.

The Fourth Arm was created and produced by Gerard Glaister, who had previously been at the helm of other World War II dramas such as Colditz and Secret Army. The serial starred former Secret Army cast member Paul Shelley as Major Hugh Gallagher, essentially a reprise of his Secret Army character, Major Nick Bradley, in all but name.
