= Dean Harris =

British actor

- Born: 30 December 1946 (age 78); Belvedere, Kent, England
- Occupation: Actor
- Height: 5 ft 8 in (1.73 m)
- Spouse: Karen Harris (m. 2006; div. 2012)
- Partners: Katy Manning (1976–1981); Deborah Franklin (1996–2002)
- Children: 3

Dean Harris (born 30 December 1946) is an English actor. He began working "in the round" in 1966, in weekly and fortnightly repertory theatres across the United Kingdom, Canada and Zimbabwe.

His two West End appearances are Judas in Godspell opposite Robert Lindsay at Wyndham's Theatre (1974) and Dadda Kemp in Entertaining Mr Sloane opposite Alison Steadman at The Arts (2001).

== Career ==
Harris has appeared in 50 television comedies and dramas and has played opposite Peter Cushing in Sherlock Holmes, Jack Warner in Dixon of Dock Green, Dennis Waterman in The Sweeney and Stay Lucky, Judi Dench in As Time Goes By, Jasper Carrot and Robert Powell in The Detectives, John Thaw in Mitch, James Bolam in Second Thoughts, Tom Conti in Old Boy Network, Adam Faith in Love Hurts, David Jason in Diamond Geezer, Warren Clarke in The Case of the Frightened Lady, Anthony Andrews in Ivanhoe, Eric Sykes in If You Go Down in the Woods Today, Michael Kitchen in Home Run, Larry Lamb in Fool's Gold and Bill Paterson in The Interrogation of John.

Harris also appeared in the BBC children television series, as the naive Mr Boyes in Bad Boyes; and the environment polluter, Mr Belcher in Earth Warp. In adult orientated series he played Sgt Quirk in Blood Money, from which Michael Denison's and Harris' characters were taken and given their own espionage series called Cold Warrior, and in the BBC series The Fourth Arm, plus the animal rights militant, Curtis Jaeger in Howards' Way.

Other television appearances occurred in Z-Cars, Softly, Softly, Bergerac, Blake's 7, Casualty, Coronation Street, EastEnders, Shoestring, London's Burning, Drop the Dead Donkey, Grange Hill, Heartbeat, Howards' Way, Silent Witness, A Touch of Frost, and five episodes of The Bill.

His voice work includes dramas on CBC Radio, the part of Vila in the initial audio recordings of Blake's 7. He played opposite Derek Jacobi in "The Martian Chronicles" and has a five-page death scene in the audio version of Dan Dare.

== Filmography ==
=== Film ===
| Year | Title | Role | Notes |
|---|---|---|---|
| 1974 | Craze | Ronnie's Friend | |
| 1977 | Double Exposure | O'Hara | |
| 1981 | If You Go Down in the Woods Today | PC Radio Operator | |
