= Blood Money (TV series) =

British television series

- Written by: Arden Winch
- Directed by: Michael E. Briant
- Starring: Michael Denison; Bernard Hepton; Juliet Hammond-Hill; Stephen Yardley; Gary Whelan; Daniel Hill
- Theme music composer: Simon May
- Country of origin: United Kingdom
- Original language: English
- No. of series: 1
- No. of episodes: 6

Production
- Producer: Gerard Glaister
- Running time: 25 minutes

Original release
- Network: BBC1
- Release: 6 September – 11 October 1981

Related
- Skorpion

Blood Money is a British television serial written by Arden Winch and produced by the BBC in 1981.

The series starred Michael Denison as Captain Percival, an operative of British Special Intelligence, who works with Scotland Yard to solve the kidnapping of the young son of the Administrator General of the United Nations by a terrorist cell. As originally written (under the title "Blood Royal"), the kidnapped child was a member of the Royal Family called Prince Rupert, but after objections by the real Royals, the character was changed.

The six-part serial was produced by Gerard Glaister, previously responsible for the Second World War drama series Secret Army. Blood Money also reunited a number of former Secret Army cast members – Bernard Hepton played the Chief Superintendent of the anti terrorist squad with Daniel Hill as Insp. Danny Clark, a brilliant linguist. Daniel Hill had also appeared in 2 episodes of Secret Army as two different characters, the last one directed by Michael E Briant. Juliet Hammond-Hill and Stephen Yardley also appeared as two of the terrorists.

The character of Captain Percival later appeared in two more BBC thriller serials – Skorpion in 1983, involving the pursuit of an assassin in Scotland, and Cold Warrior in 1984, an eight-part collection of individual stories which also starred Daniel Hill and Jack McKenzie.

== Cast ==
- Michael Denison – Captain Aubrey Percival
- Bernard Hepton – Det. Chief Supt. Meadows
- Juliet Hammond-Hill – Irene Kohl
- Gary Whelan – Danny Connors
- Stephen Yardley – James Drew
- Cavan Kendall – Charles Vivian
- Daniel Hill – Insp. Clark
- Anna Mottram – WPC Barratt
- Reg Woods – Det. Sgt. Summers
- Jack McKenzie – Det. Insp. Perry
- Dean Harris – Sgt. Danny Quirk
- Grant Warnock – Viscount Rupert Fitzcharles
