= Gerard Glaister =

British TV producer and director (1915–2005)

John Leslie Glaister DFC (21 December 1915 – 5 February 2005), known as Gerard or Gerrard Glaister, was a British television producer and director best known for his work with the BBC. Amongst his most notable successes as a producer were Colditz, The Brothers, Secret Army and Howards' Way.

== Biography ==
After studying at RADA, Glaister made his West End debut in 1939. With the outbreak of war, he joined the Royal Air Force, commissioned as Pilot Officer on 8 September 1939 and initially flying a Blenheim bomber. He later served as a photo reconnaissance pilot in 208 Squadron RAF in the Western Desert, initially flying Westland Lysanders. It was during these latter duties that he was awarded the Distinguished Flying Cross on 6 October 1942, for a hazardous reconnaissance flight in an unarmed Hurricane at extremely low level across the Italian front line. He rose to the rank of Squadron Leader and retired from the RAF on 5 August 1952 (for medical reasons). Glaister later drew on his RAF experiences when, in 1963, he produced Moonstrike, a drama about resistance agents in occupied Europe during the Second World War. From 1962, he worked on the popular Dr. Finlay's Casebook. His 1968 production The Expert is based on the work of his uncle, forensic scientist Prof John Glaister FRSE.

Glaister's success ended with the 1991 series Trainer, which was moved from prime time to a weeknight slot because of its perceived failure. However, it sold well overseas.

Glaister was married three times and had three daughters, two from his final marriage, to Joan.

== Filmography ==
=== Producer ===
- 1958: Starr and Company
- 1958: Big Guns
- 1959: The Widow of Bath
- 1959: The Men From Room 13
- 1962: The Dark Island
- 1962: Dr. Finlay's Casebook
- 1963: Moonstrike
- 1967: The Revenue Men
- 1968: The Expert
- 1970: Codename
- 1971: The Passenger
- 1972: The Long Chase
- 1972: The Brothers
- 1972: Colditz
- 1975: Oil Strike North
- 1977: The Mackinnons
- 1977: Secret Army
- 1979: The Fourth Arm
- 1980: Buccaneer
- 1981: Blood Money
- 1981: Kessler
- 1983: Skorpion
- 1984: Cold Warrior
- 1984: Morgan's Boy
- 1985: Howards' Way
- 1991: Trainer

=== Writer ===
- 1968: The Expert
- 1972: The Brothers
- 1972: Colditz
- 1975: Oil Strike North
- 1975: You're On Your Own
- 1977: Secret Army
- 1979: The Fourth Arm
- 1985: Howards' Way

=== Director ===
- 1962: The Set Up
- 1962 The Share Out
- 1962: The Dark Island
- 1962: Dr. Finlay's Casebook
- 1966: King of the River
- 1968: The Expert
- 1970: Codename
- 1975: Oil Strike North
