= Secret Army (TV series) =

British TV drama series (1977–1979)

- Main title caption, seen throughout the series.
- Created by: Gerard Glaister
- Starring: Bernard Hepton; Angela Richards; Clifford Rose; Juliet Hammond-Hill; Michael Culver; Terrence Hardiman; Jan Francis; Christopher Neame; Ron Pember; Valentine Dyall; Hazel McBride; Stephen Yardley
- Countries of origin: United Kingdom; Belgium
- Original language: English
- No. of series: 3
- No. of episodes: 43 (list of episodes)

Production
- Running time: 50 minutes

Original release
- Network: BBC1; BRT
- Release: 7 September 1977 – 15 December 1979

Related
- Kessler

Secret Army is a British television drama made by the BBC and the Belgian national broadcaster BRT (now VRT) created by Gerard Glaister. It tells the story of a fictional Belgian resistance movement in German-occupied Belgium during the Second World War, an escape line dedicated to returning Allied airmen, usually shot down by the Luftwaffe, to Great Britain. It was made in the UK and Belgium and three series were broadcast on BBC1 between 7 September 1977 and 15 December 1979.

Fay Weldon said of the series: "There is, in the making of such programmes, a level of professionalism, and sheer patient, largely unacclaimed, hard work from producer to script editor to writer to designer to vision mixer to editor by way of sound and lighting engineers that is probably equalled only in a heart transplant theatre".

== Series overview ==
=== Series One ===
Lisa Colbert runs Lifeline, a Brussels-based evasion organisation. It helps Allied aircrew to evade capture and return to Britain via neutral Switzerland or Spain. She is helped by Albert Foiret, proprietor of the Cafe Candide, his mistress Monique Duchamps, and waitress Natalie Chantrens.

Their operations are placed under strain when the fervent Nazi, Gestapo Sturmbannführer Ludwig Kessler is assigned to work with Luftwaffe Major Erwin Brandt and close down the evasion line.

Flight Lieutenant John Curtis, a former evader, is sent back by London as a Special Operations Executive liaison officer to coordinate its activity. At first he is greeted with hostility and suspicion; there is also romantic tension between him and Lisa.

The series highlights the risks that the main characters take to rescue the young airmen whilst under German occupation, protecting their safe houses, and evading investigation. By the end of this series, Kessler and Brandt are closing in on Curtis as their investigation into a murder in France has led them to the name 'Monsieur Maurice', which is Curtis's pseudonym. Brandt and Kessler pay their first visit to the Candide to locate him. Kessler's interest in Curtis poses a significant threat to Lifeline and so it is agreed that Curtis will return to England. Kessler orders a troop encirclement of Brussels, but Curtis manages to escape to Switzerland by posing as bus driver for a local Hitler Youth group that is travelling out of the city on a day trip.

Albert is having an affair with barmaid Monique Duchamps, while his wife Andrée is bedridden, following an accident two years prior (an out-of-control lorry had ploughed into Albert's car, with Andrée as a passenger). In the final episode Andrée finds out by spotting Monique going into Albert's bedroom. She tries to speak to Albert and gets into her wheelchair for the first time, but falls down the stairs and breaks her neck, dying instantly.

Other characters introduced are:

- Gaston Colbert, Lisa's uncle and bank manager, who has been helping Lifeline, and his wife Louise. A batch of forged banknotes is traced to Gaston, and Kessler interrogates him in the belief he will lead to the people running the evasion line. Lisa later learns that Gaston has been shot dead trying to escape from German HQ.
- Alain Muny, Lifeline's wireless operator, who maintains contact with London and supplies the Candide with food from his farm.
- Dr Pascal Keldermans, who helps with medical treatment for the airmen and gives Lisa cover by employing her as a nurse at his surgery.

=== Series Two ===
Albert has sold the Cafe Candide and owns an upper-class black-market restaurant, called the Restaurant Candide, which is prominently located in the Grand-Place. This venture is 60% clandestinely owned and financed by London, so as to enable the members of Lifeline to cater for senior German officers, allowing them to overhear indiscretions and to provide better cover for their activities. Albert takes over running Lifeline when Lisa is killed (in the first episode) by Allied bombing, whilst travelling in occupied France.

The German officers frequent the new establishment regularly, allowing the principal characters to interact and increasing the dramatic tension. To capitalise on actress Angela Richards's singing talent, Monique performs regularly for the diners, and this becomes a feature of the series. These scenes transform the character of Monique from a dowdy waitress to a sultry chanteuse, and contrast with their stressful undercover activities.

Secondary storylines include Kessler's developing romance with lonely Belgian 'society woman' Madeleine Duclos, whom he meets while dining alone at Le Candide, and Brandt being asked to join a conspiracy to assassinate Hitler. Although he declines, he comes to be seen as guilty by association. This, and the death of his family in a British air raid on Berlin, results in his suicide to avoid a court-martial, on the same day as the Normandy landings.

The series also introduces a new character, Max Brocard who works at the Candide as a pianist in order to replace Gaston as Lifeline’s forger. Unknown to everyone else, Max is part of the Belgian Communist Resistance and is plotting to take over Lifeline, in order to use its money and political influence from London to establish a Communist takeover of Belgium at the end of the war. He becomes responsible for the death of Natalie's boyfriend François. Along with almost all the other Communist saboteurs, Max is shot dead by the Germans and the civil police whilst taking part in resistance activities, their whereabouts having been tipped off by Albert after he has confirmed that Max is a Communist mole. His death leads to terrible repercussions for Albert in the third series.

=== Series Three ===
The series is set during the final weeks of German occupation. Paul Vercors, the leader and sole survivor of the Communist cell to which Max belonged, begins a conspiracy of revenge against Albert. He lodges an accusation with the authorities that Albert murdered his wife. With Albert in prison for much of the series, responsibility for Lifeline falls to Monique. She becomes more independent and eventually her relationship with Albert collapses, owing to his aloofness and her realising that he is more concerned about money than her. After the Germans severely restrict travel to and from Brussels and the Communists sabotage the main railway line, the evasion lines are closed. The rescued airmen can now only be hidden while they all await the end of the war. With Albert away, Monique and Natalie face accusations of being German collaborators, prostitutes and black-marketeers. As news of the Allied troops' imminent arrival reaches the streets, the Germans find it increasingly difficult to keep order and eventually they leave the Belgians to their own devices.

Kessler, promoted to Standartenführer, finds himself in constant conflict with new arrival Major Hans Dietrich Reinhardt, who has been sent to replace Brandt. The pair clash because Reinhardt can see the desperate situation the Germans face, whereas Kessler remains blinded by patriotism and Nazi ideology. Reinhardt is a cynical and world-weary war hero (he has been awarded the Knight's Cross), whose unorthodox approach is at odds with Kessler's by-the-book methods. Reinhart begins to get results and near the end of the series succeeds in identifying Le Candide as the headquarters of Lifeline.

In Albert's absence, Lifeline is helped by Major Nicholas "Nick" Bradley, a charismatic British agent who previously appeared during the second series. Monique resents his presence, believing he threatens her new authority, whereas Natalie has been attracted to Bradley since his earlier visit. Bradley's job is to make sure the remaining evaders are fed and armed to protect themselves whilst they hide in the Ardennes. During his time in Belgium, Bradley succeeds in saving Alain from torture by the Gestapo, blows up a convoy, destroys a V-2 site and discovers where the Germans have laid explosives in the city. Bradley is later shot dead the day before the German withdrawal, being found in the streets after curfew.

When the order for German withdrawal is finally given, Kessler tries to escape with his Belgian mistress, Madeleine. Realizing that his capture could lead to execution, Kessler assumes the identity of a lower-ranking officer, shortly before he is captured by British soldiers and put in a prisoner-of-war camp. Rather than evacuate Brussels, Reinhardt satisfies his own curiosity and visits the Candide. As he suspects, he discovers that this has been the headquarters of Lifeline all along. He chooses not to execute Albert, Monique, Alain and Pascal but hands himself over to Albert as his prisoner. At the same time, Paul Vercors and his communists arrive and take Albert, Reinhardt and Monique captive. Albert is hanged after a Communist-run 'kangaroo court' finds him guilty of treachery for his part in the death of Max Brocard; just in time, he is cut down and saved by British troops. Monique is captured by Brussels residents and held as a collaborator, waiting to have her head shaved in front of the angry crowds. Natalie and the newly arrived British Captain Stephen Durnford manage to rescue her. Monique and the Captain fall in love and Monique realises that she no longer loves Albert; she decides to marry the captain instead.

Having been arrested by the British officers who saved Albert, Reinhardt is put in the same camp as Kessler. To protect his new identity and with the grudging support of the senior officers, Kessler engineers a court-martial of Reinhardt for allowing himself to be captured and disobeying the orders of a superior officer. Despite there being only flimsy evidence, Kessler arranges for Reinhardt to be found guilty and he is shot dead by a German firing squad. This scene reflects an actual incident in Amsterdam on 13 May 1945.

At the same time Kessler's mistress Madeleine bribes Staff Sergeant Dexter to allow her lover's freedom and the couple escape together. For the members of the evasion line, their happiness is tinged with sadness as they all say goodbye to a tearful Monique, who says her final goodbyes to the Candide and to Albert before starting a new life with her husband.

==== Unbroadcast episode ====
The final episode in the series, "What Did You Do in the War, Daddy?", was set in 1969 and was never broadcast. It looked at how the characters had fared after the war. The reasons for its non-broadcast are unknown. It is possible it was because of the episode's anti-Communist message. BBC historian, Professor Jean Seaton, was interviewed on the subject in 2009 and expressed the belief the tone would have offended BBC executives who had served in the war. Shaun Ley, the presenter of a BBC Radio 4 radio programme Shelved, discussing this and other suppressed drama programmes from the period, wrote an article for the corporation's website stating: "It questioned the whole point of the resistance and went so far as to suggest that fighting the Nazis had led the allies to miss the main threat - communism."

The main themes of the episode were subsequently incorporated into a sequel, Kessler, a series which was transmitted in 1981 and explored Kessler's fate.

== Production ==
Secret Army was created by Gerard Glaister as a follow-up to his drama series Colditz. Glaister was a former RAF pilot and his experiences provided the inspiration for the series. Secret Army loosely portrays the operations of WW II escape and evasion lines especially the Belgian-created Comet line. The character of John Curtis was influenced by the experiences of the series's technical consultant, Group Captain William Randle, who escaped from occupied Europe in 1942 and was later Keeper of the Battle of Britain Museum.

The series followed the timeline of the war to show how it affected Belgium. Filming took place in Belgium, with the assistance of BRT. Other locations were in London and Norfolk. The aircraft type that featured throughout the series was the Westland Lysander.

The title sequence was created by Alan Jeapes, whose credits include EastEnders. The theme music was by Robert Farnon.

The series was later parodied in the BBC comedy series 'Allo 'Allo!, with some cast members appearing in both series.

== Cast ==
Character	Series 1	Series 2	Series 3
Albert Foiret	Bernard Hepton	Bernard Hepton	Bernard Hepton
Lisa "Yvette" Colbert	Jan Francis	Jan Francis	
Flight Lt. John Curtis	Christopher Neame		
Monique Duchamps	Angela Richards	Angela Richards	Angela Richards
Ludwig Kessler	Clifford Rose	Clifford Rose	Clifford Rose
Maj. Erwin Brandt	Michael Culver	Michael Culver	
Natalie Chantrens	Juliet Hammond-Hill	Juliet Hammond-Hill	Juliet Hammond-Hill
Dr Pascal Keldermans	Valentine Dyall	Valentine Dyall	Valentine Dyall
Alain Muny	Ron Pember	Ron Pember	Ron Pember
Andrée Foiret	Eileen Page		
Cpl. Veit Rennert	Robin Langford	Robin Langford	
Jacques Bol	Timothy Morand		
Gaston Colbert	James Bree		
Louise Colbert	Maria Charles		
Hans van Broecken	Gunnar Möller	Gunnar Möller	Gunnar Möller
Lena van Broecken	Marianne Stone	Marianne Stone	
Yvonne	Henrietta Baynes	Henrietta Baynes	
Max Brocard		Stephen Yardley	
Insp. Paul Delon		John D. Collins	John D. Collins
Madeleine Duclos		Hazel McBride	Hazel McBride
François		Nigel Williams	
Maj. Nick Bradley		Paul Shelley	Paul Shelley
Wullner		Neil Daglish	Neil Daglish
Geneviève		Trisha Clarke	Trisha Clarke
Jelinek			David Neilson
Maj. Hans-Dietrich Reinhardt			Terrence Hardiman
Paul Vercors		Michael Byrne	Ralph Bates
Capt. Stephen Durnford			Stephan Chase
Hauptmann Müller			Hilary Minster
Paul			Ken Moule (uncredited)

=== Crew ===
- Producer — Gerard Glaister
- Script editor — John Brason
- Script supervisors — Frank Radcliffe, James Cadman
- Designers — Ray London, Richard Morris, Marjorie Pratt, Austin Ruddy
- Music arranger — Ken Moule (Series 3)

== Merchandise ==
=== Books ===
John Brason wrote a prequel novel entitled Secret Army, and two novelisations of his episodes entitled Secret Army Dossier and The End of the Line.

As stated on its back cover, Secret Army Dossier 'brings together two episodes from the first series [Good Friday and Be the First Kid in Your Block to Rule the World], three from the second [mostly material from Russian Roulette and Day of Wrath], and a specially written story to cover the events between'.

The End of the Line covers several series three episodes, principally Revenge, Ring of Rosies, Just Light the Blue Touch Paper, Collaborator, Bridgehead and The Execution.

An unofficial guidebook to the series is available entitled The Complete Secret Army. This features reviews of every episode, information on the real-life events that inspired the series, behind-the-scenes production material, a location guide, and reminiscences and photos from cast and crew. The book is written by Secret Army fan Andy Priestner, and was published by Classic TV Press in December 2008.

=== VHS ===
In 1991 the retailer WHSmith released an exclusive double-tape compilation of seven selected episodes between – and including – the first and last of Series Two, running to 326 minutes in total.

=== DVD ===
The complete three series set of Secret Army is available on DVD (Region 2, UK) from DD Home Entertainment. This also carries interviews with cast members Angela Richards, Clifford Rose, Juliet Hammond-Hill, Terrence Hardiman and Hazel McBride. It does not include the final unbroadcast episode (see above).

=== CD ===
The songs performed by Angela Richards and pianist Ken Moule proved so popular with audiences that a BBC soundtrack album entitled Au Café Candide was released. Long since deleted, the songs are now available on a new CD recorded some 25 years after the first, entitled An Evening at Le Candide. Tracks include Richards's own compositions "Memories Come Gently" and "If This Is The Last Time I See You", together with popular Forties numbers such as "Lilli Marlene" and "J'attendrai".

== See also ==
- List of Secret Army episodes
- Kessler, a spin-off series featuring the character Ludwig Kessler played by Clifford Rose
- The Fourth Arm (TV series), another TV production by Gerard Glaister set during WWII.
- 'Allo 'Allo!, a 1982–92 BBC sitcom, set in occupied France, which drew considerable inspiration from the restaurant setting and resistance intrigue of Secret Army
- Fairly Secret Army, a 1984–86 British situation comedy written by David Nobbs, starring Geoffrey Palmer
