= The Simon May Collection =

Compilation album by Simon May
- Released: 13 September 2010
- Genre: Soundtrack
- Label: Edsel, Demon Music Group

Simon May chronology
New Vintage: The Best of Simon May	The Simon May Collection

The Simon May Collection is a 2010 compilation album of television and film music written by Simon May.

The album was released to coincide with the departure of the character Peggy Mitchell, played by Barbara Windsor, from the BBC soap opera EastEnders. May, who composed the original EastEnders theme in 1984, was commissioned to rework "Julia's Theme", a slow, piano version of the main theme traditionally used at "the end of episodes featuring intense emotion or drama". The track, "Peggy's Theme", was made available to download following the broadcast of the character's departure.

May appeared playing numbers from the collection in a concert at the Corn Exchange in Devizes on 22 September 2010.

== Track listing ==
1. "Peggy's Theme" (variation of "Julia's Theme" from EastEnders) performed by Simon May
2. "Always There" (from Howards' Way) performed by Susie Webb & The Simon May Orchestra
3. "More to Life" (from BBC TV series Trainer) performed by Cliff Richard
4. "Holiday Suite" (from BBC TV Holiday '86) performed by the Simon May Orchestra
5. "I'm Drowning" performed by James Keogh
6. "Summer of My Life" performed by Simon May (2010 version duet with Rosie May)
7. "Eldorado" (theme from BBC TV series Eldorado) performed by the Simon May Orchestra
8. "Howards' Way Theme" performed by the Simon May Orchestra
9. "One More Chance" performed by Jack Duxbury
10. "The Dawning Suite" (1st Movement) performed by The Simon May Orchestra
11. "Every Loser Wins" performed by Nick Berry
12. "All of Me" performed by Charley Rouse
13. "Barracuda" (from Howards' Way) performed by the Simon May Orchestra
14. "Abbey's Theme" (from Howards' Way) performed by the Simon May Orchestra
15. "Frere" (from Howards' Way) performed by the Simon May Orchestra
16. "Wolfgang" performed by Simon May
17. "Anyone Can Fall in Love" performed by Anita Dobson & The Simon May Orchestra
18. "By the River" performed by James Keogh
19. "Parents"/"Better Off The Way I Am" (from the musical Smike) performed by Matthew Padden & The Simon May Orchestra
20. "I'll See You Again" (School Leavers' Song) performed by the Simon May Orchestra & Choirs
21. "EastEnders Theme" (new BBC TV version 2009) performed by the Simon May Orchestra
22. "Glory Be (To God on High)" (EastEnders Hymn) performed by the Simon May Orchestra & Choirs
23. "Bless This Moment" performed by Susie Webb

== See also ==
- New Vintage: The Best of Simon May — a 1994 compilation album.
