= Corn Exchange, Devizes =

Commercial building in Devizes, England

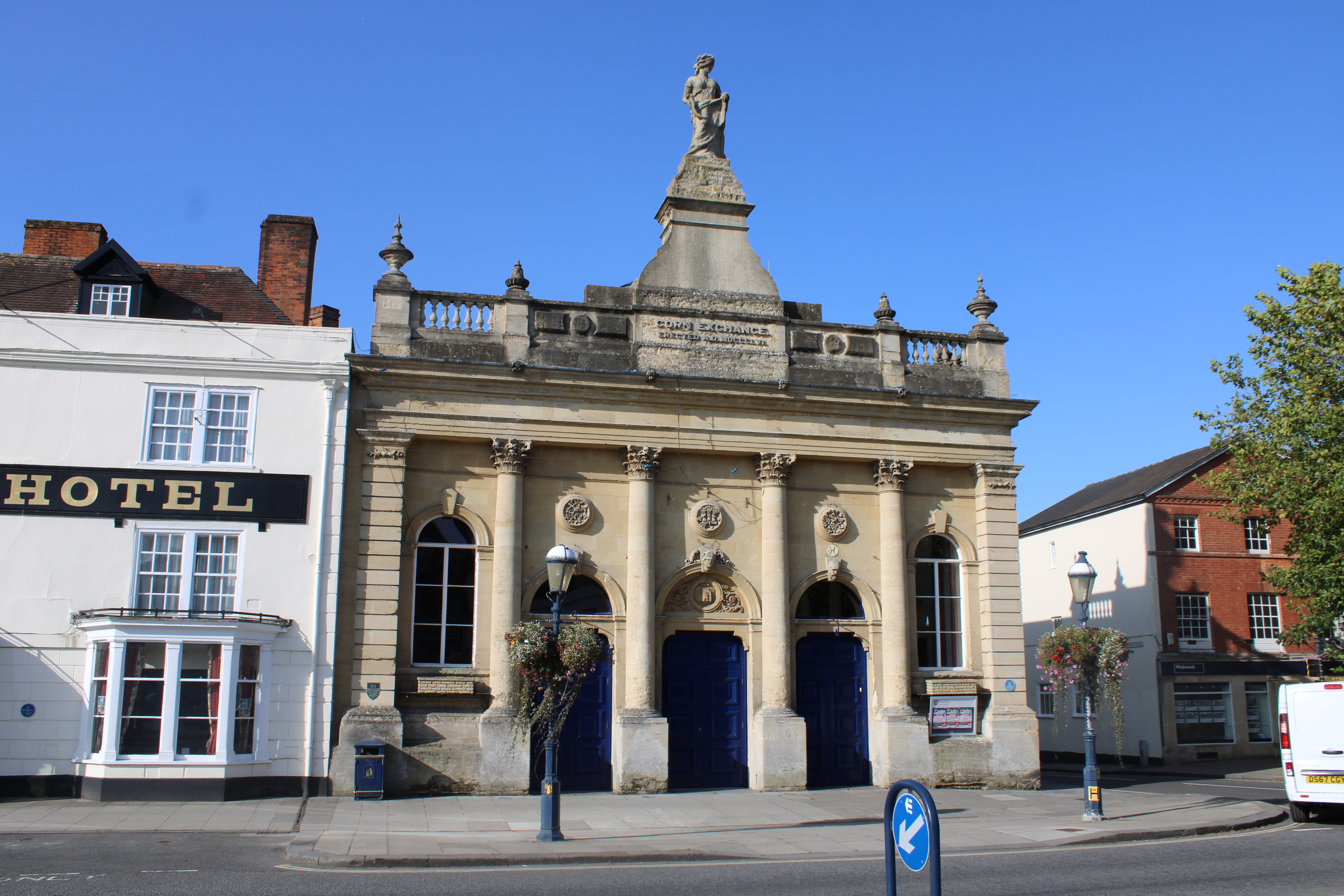
- Corn Exchange, Devizes

- Shown in Wiltshire
- 51.3523°N 1.9963°W
- Location: The Market Place, Devizes

History
- Built: 1857

Site notes
- Architect: William Hill
- Architectural style: Neoclassical style

Listed Building – Grade II
- Official name: The Corn Exchange
- Designated: 9 April 1954
- Reference no.: 1250364

The Corn Exchange is a commercial building in the Market Place, Devizes, Wiltshire, England. The structure, which was commissioned as a corn exchange and is now used as an events venue, is a Grade II listed building.

== History ==
Until the mid-19th century, corn merchants in the town traded their goods in the open, with sacks piled around the market cross. In the mid-19th century, civic officials decided to commission a purpose-built corn exchange: the site they selected was occupied by the Bear Assembly Rooms. The old assembly rooms were demolished and new assembly rooms were erected at the rear of the Bear Hotel.

The current building was designed by William Hill of Leeds in the neoclassical style, built by John Rendall of Devizes in ashlar stone at a cost of £3,456 and was officially opened by the mayor, Henry Butcher, on 3 December 1857. The design involved a symmetrical main frontage of five bays facing onto the Market Place. The central section of three bays featured three round headed openings with fanlights, architraves and keystones flanked by Corinthian order columns, supporting a frieze, an entablature and stone balustrade. The outer bays were fenestrated by round headed windows with architraves and keystones. At roof level, there was a central pedestal supporting a statue of the goddess, Ceres, as well as four decorative urns. The Station Road elevation featured a long range of round headed openings flanked by Corinthian order pilasters supporting a frieze, an entablature and a parapet in a similar style to the main elevation.

The use of the building as a corn exchange declined significantly in the wake of the Great Depression of British Agriculture in the late 19th century. However, the building was used as a public venue and concert performers included the contralto singer, Kathleen Ferrier, who made an appearance on 13 April 1953. It was used for scenes in the film, Far from the Madding Crowd, which starred Julie Christie and was made in 1967. Later performers included the rock band, The Who, in November 1968, the progressive rock band, Yes, in September 1971 and the hard rock band, Thin Lizzy, in February 1973. The heavy metal band, Judas Priest, also performed there in October 1974.

The condition of the building declined significantly during the 1980s. After an extensive programme of refurbishment works in the early 1990s, the building was re-opened by the local member of parliament, Sir Charles Morrison, on 3 May 1995. In May 2010, the building was also the venue for a performance of the musical, Smike, adapted from Charles Dickens' 1839 novel Nicholas Nickleby with music by Roger Holman and Simon May. In September 2010, May returned to the corn exchange to play numbers from his compilation album of television and film music, The Simon May Collection.

== See also ==
- Corn exchanges in England
