= New Vintage: The Best of Simon May =

Compilation album by Simon May
- Released: 1994
- Genre: Soundtrack
- Length: 53:12
- Label: Artist Record Company

Simon May chronology
Simon's Way	New Vintage: The Best of Simon May	The Simon May Collection

New Vintage: The Best of Simon May is a 1994 compilation album featuring some of the key works from British film and television music composer Simon May.

The album was accompanied by a UK tour, named "A Night Away From the TV". May used several school choirs for the show including Wareham Middle School, which also included performers Kate Robbins and 1990 Opportunity Knocks winner Mark Rattray. Some performances had to be cancelled because of low ticket sales.

A BBC television Pebble Mill special was broadcast on BBC1 on 20 December 1994. It featured aspects of the planning, rehearsals and performances of the tour, including comments by Cliff Richard about the failure of some projects. May discussed the writing process, especially for the theme to Jobs for the Girls. It included interviews with Tony Holland, Gerard Glaister and Verity Lambert, who discussed his work for EastEnders, Howards' Way and Eldorado respectively.

== Track listing ==
Orchestral tracks are performed by the Simon May Orchestra.

Track No.	Title	Associated show	Notes
1	"EastEnders"	EastEnders	Leslie Osborne has a co-writer credit. This track is similar to the unpopular jazzy revamp of the theme heard in the programme around the time of this album's release.
2	"Always There"; Vocals: Marti Webb	Howards' Way	Leslie Osbourne has a co-writer credit. Lyrics by Don Black. Vocal version of the theme tune, used over the end credits in the second series.
3	"Barracuda"	Howards' Way	Extended version of the closing theme.
4	"When You Go Away"; Vocals: Johnny Griggs	Eldorado	Vocal version of the theme, used over the end credits of the show's final episode. It was released as a single.
5	"Every Loser Wins"; Vocals: Nick Berry	EastEnders	Featured in a 1980s EastEnders storyline with Simon Wicks (Berry), and was a UK number one single in 1986.
6	"Trainer"	Trainer	
7	"More Than in Love"; Vocals: Kate Robbins	Crossroads	Co-written with Barry Leng; reached no. 2 in the UK singles chart
8	"Summer of My Life"; Vocals: Simon May	Crossroads	Reached no. 7 in the UK singles chart.
9	"Holiday Suite"	Holiday	Co-written with Barry Leng; reached no. 2 in the UK singles chart
10	"More to Life"; Vocals: Cliff Richard	Trainer	Lyrics by Don Black. Vocal version of the Trainer theme
11	"We'll Find Our Day"; Vocals: Mark Rattray and Emma Robbins	Smike	Re-recorded version with one of the performers on the 1994 tour.
12	"Jobs for the Girls/Food and Drink/TV Weekly/Morning on BBC1"	Jobs for the Girls/Food and Drink/TV Weekly/Morning on BBC1	Compilation of several themes.
13	"The Dawning"	The Dawning	
14	"Wolfgang"; Vocals: Simon May		Inspired by Wolfgang Amadeus Mozart.

== See also ==
- The Simon May Collection — a 2010 compilation album.
