= Eldorado (TV series) =

British television soap opera (1992–1993)

Coordinates: 36.627°N 4.757°W

- Eldorado opening titles
- Genre: Soap opera
- Created by: Tony Holland
- Directed by: Stephen Butcher; Mervyn Cumming
- Starring: Jesse Birdsall; Jill Benedict; Patricia Brake; Julie Fernandez; Polly Perkins; Derek Martin; Campbell Morrison; Leslee Udwin; Sandra Sandri; Roland Curram; Buki Armstrong; Faith Kent; Kathy Pitkin; Darren Newton; Jon Morrey; Franco Rey; Stella Maris; Framboise Gommendy; Kim Romer; Matt Wilkinson; Nanna Moller; Bo Corre; Iker Ibanez; Nile Bradshaw; Roger Walker; Daniel Lombart; William Lucas; Hilary Crane; Josh Nathan; Alex Leam
- Country of origin: United Kingdom
- Original language: English
- No. of episodes: 156

Production
- Production locations: Coín, Spain
- Running time: 30 minutes
- Production companies: BBC; Cinema Verity; J.Dark y J.Todesco

Original release
- Network: BBC1
- Release: 6 July 1992 – 9 July 1993

Eldorado is a British soap opera created by Tony Holland. It ran for only one year, from 6 July 1992 to 9 July 1993. Set in the fictional town of Los Barcos on the Costa Eldorado in Spain and following the lives of British and European expatriates, the BBC hoped it would be as successful as EastEnders and replicate some of the sunshine and glamour of imported Australian soaps such as Home and Away and Neighbours.

In spite of a high-profile advertising campaign on television, radio and in the press preceding the launch ('Are you ready for Eldorado?', read by actor Campbell Morrison), the programme was not initially a popular hit with viewers or critics. Following a radical overhaul, ratings improved, but it was deemed too late to save the programme and it was cancelled by BBC1's new controller, Alan Yentob, in March 1993.

== Creation ==
A photo of all characters who first appeared in Eldorado in 1992.

Eldorado was conceived originally from an internal competition within the BBC as a replacement for Terry Wogan's chat show Wogan, which aired on Mondays, Wednesdays and Fridays at 7.00 pm. The series was created by Tony Holland and produced by Julia Smith, both of whom had collaborated before whilst creating fellow BBC soap EastEnders. The original working title for the series being Little England, in which a group of British expats lived within an enclave of the Spanish coast. However, during production, the concept was radically revised. The first episode was written by Tony Jordan, who, several years after Eldorado, criticised the start of the soap.

Eldorado eventually became a co-production between the BBC and independent production company Cinema Verity, James Todesco and John Dark. While Smith served as the series producer, Verity Lambert was made the show's executive producer. At the time, Lambert had established her reputation as an in-house producer for the BBC, having previously launched the BBC's successful science fiction television series Doctor Who.

== Problems and criticism ==
The series was set to debut in September 1992, but the premiere date was brought forward to July of that year, which meant the turnaround of production had to be quickened. Although the show featured many professional actors, including Patricia Brake and Jesse Birdsall, many of the cast were inexperienced actors whose limitations became exposed on a new and ambitious project. Prior to filming, some of the cast were even unaware what a read-through was; the quality of the acting was derided by some tabloid newspapers.

As a result of filming in bare-walled villas rather than a studio, there were many sound and acoustic problems, such as reverberation. Possibly in a bid to court media attention, Eldorado opened with the controversial story of a middle-aged man, Bunny (played by Roger Walker), returning from the UK with a 17-year-old bride, Fizz (Kathy Pitkin); many viewers felt this storyline was implausible and sordid. On top of this, ITV decided to air a special one-hour edition of Coronation Street on the show's debut evening, reputedly an attempt by network executives to sabotage the programme.

As a result, the costly production – although not exorbitant by contemporary television standards – was used by critics of the television licence to argue that the BBC was feathering the nest of former employees. Due to the stresses of internal feuding, producer Julia Smith had a nervous breakdown and left the soap opera. She was replaced by Corinne Hollingworth, who had previously worked on EastEnders. Hollingworth brought about many changes to Eldorado by hiring new scriptwriters, creating extra rehearsal time and removing many of the inexperienced actors who had attracted criticism.

== Cancellation ==
Changes made by Hollingworth to rectify the soap's early problems led to a ratings increase, but it was claimed that this was not enough to justify its continued production, and incoming controller of BBC1, Alan Yentob, cancelled the programme, which had been commissioned by his predecessor Jonathan Powell.

In the UK, Eldorado is remembered as an embarrassing failure for the BBC, with The Guardian billing it "the most famous soap flop of all time". Eldorado is sometimes used as a byword for any unsuccessful, poorly received or over-hyped television programme. It is widely thought that the failure of the soap is the reason why the BBC has not attempted to launch a brand new fully-networked, prime-time soap opera from scratch since then, with the corporation opting instead to move established series Casualty and Holby City to year-round production.

The series ended with one of its central characters, Marcus Tandy (Jesse Birdsall), escaping an attempt on his life with his car being blown up, and sailing off into the distance on a boat with his girlfriend Pilar Moreno (Sandra Sandri). Some viewers noticed that the car that was blown up was not, in fact, the Renault Alpine A610 driven by Marcus, but a thinly disguised much older model, the Triumph TR7. The final line of dialogue, delivered by Tandy, was: "You can't trust anyone these days, can you?"

== Later years ==
=== Repeat showings ===
Eldorado was repeated on UK Gold between 1995 and 1996 and again in 2002. Then in July 2021, select episodes of Eldorado became available in the UK on BritBox and later ITVX. On 27 January 2025, U&Drama began showing the series.

=== The set ===
The set, situated near the village of Coín, is still in existence, despite having lain empty for many years. Years following the demise of Eldorado, fans were able to tour the set. The set was then converted into a hotel complex called Hotel Ciudad Del Cine (Cinema City Hotel). The hotel continued to allow filming to take place; the set featured in the music video for the single "Nothing on But The Radio" by The Alice Band in 2002. The set has been used for various Spanish television serials both produced and broadcast in the region of Andalucía. The set has also been used for international recordings, including the Indian version of Fear Factor, which was shot in the Commercial Plaza. Since the closure of the hotel, the site has been used for airsoft shooting, and continues to be used for productions; it is now known as Ciudad Del Airsoft (Airsoft City). Future plans for the site are to renovate and reopen as a holiday resort. The beach and marina scenes were filmed at Puerto de Cabopino near Marbella.

== Music ==
Following their collaboration on EastEnders, Julia Smith and Tony Holland commissioned Simon May to write the theme tune. May reworked a song called "When You Go Away" which he had written for his ill-fated musical Mefisto, based on Goethe's Faust, adding Spanish guitars to make it more relevant to the Eldorado project. An instrumental version of the theme was used for the opening and closing credits. However, the vocal version of the song was recorded by Johnny Griggs and was used over the closing credits of the final episode. "When You Go Away" was released as a single and included on the album New Vintage: The Best of Simon May, and the full instrumental version of the theme was included on the compilation album The Simon May Collection.

== Main cast ==
- Drew Lockhead – Campbell Morrison (1992–1993)
- Gwen Lockhead – Patricia Brake (1992–1993)
- Blair Lockhead – Josh Nathan (1992–1993)
- Nessa Lockhead – Julie Fernandez (1992–1993)
- Marcus Tandy – Jesse Birdsall (1992–1993)
- Joy Slater – Leslee Udwin (1992–1993)
- Trish Valentine – Polly Perkins (1992–1993)
- Ingrid Olsson – Bo Corre (1992–1993)
- Pilar Moreno – Sandra Sandri (1992–1993)
- Freddie Martin – Roland Curram (1992–1993)
- Rosemary Webb – Hilary Crane (1992–1993)
- Roberto Fernandez – Franco Rey (1992–1993)
- Rosario Fernandez – Stella Maris (1992–1993)
- Olive King – Faith Kent (1992–1993)
- Gerry Peters-Smith – Buki Armstrong (1992–1993)
- Isabelle Leduc – Framboise Gommendy (1992–1993)
- Per Svendsen – Kim Rømer (1992–1993)
- Stanley Webb – William Lucas (1992–1993)
- Lene Svendsen – Nanna Møller (1992–1993)
- Philippe Leduc – Daniel Lombart (1992–1993)
- Maria Fernandez – Maria Sanchez (1992–1993)
- Javier "Paco" Fernandez – Iker Ibanez (1992–1993)
- Snowy White – Patch Connolly (1992–1993)
- Trine Svendsen – Marchell Betak/Clare Wilkie (1992–1993)
- Arnaud Leduc – Mikael Philippe (1992–1993)
- Allan Hindle – Jon Morrey (1992)
- Terry Flynn – Ben Murphy (1992–1993)
- Gavin Hindle – Darren Newton (1992)
- Dieter Shultz – Kai Maurer (1992)
- Alex Morris – Derek Martin (1993)
- 'Razor' Sharp – Kevin Hay (1993)
- Abuela Fernandez – María Vega (1992–1993)
- Natalie Jackson – Tessa Wojtczak (1992–1993)
- Bunny Charlson - Roger Walker (1992-1993)
- Fizz Charlson – Kathy Pitkin (1992)
- Sergio Munoz D'Avila – Alexander Torriglia (1993)
- Stephen Law – Stephen Hattersley (1992–1993)
- Roger Noble – Keith Bookman (1992–1993)
- Kitty Hindle – Jeannie Crowther (1992)
- Anna Svendsen – Grethe Holmer (1993)
- Ranjit Singh – Amerjit Deu (1992)
- Jaskaran Singh – Ravi Aujla (1992)
- Maribel Fernandez – Barbara Bonelli (1992–1993)
- Pablo Fernandez – Jorge Cano (1992–1993)
- Susan Wilkinson – Fiona Walker (1993)
- Clive Mitchell – Charlie Condou (1992)
- Joe Hobbs – Alex Leam (1992–1993)
