= New Vintage =

New Vintage may refer to:

- New Vintage: The Best of Simon May, a 1994 compilation album
- New Vintage (Maynard Ferguson album), 1977
