= Anyone Can Fall in Love =

Single by Anita Dobson and the Simon May Orchestra

from the album Simon's Way
- B-side: "EastEnders theme tune"
- Released: 28 July 1986
- Recorded: 1986
- Genre: Pop
- Length: 3:32
- Label: BBC
- Composers: Simon May and Leslie Osborne
- Lyricist: Don Black
- Producers: Anita Dobson, Simon May, Dave Hewson

Anita Dobson singles chronology
"Anyone Can Fall in Love" (1986)	"Talking of Love" (1987)

"Anyone Can Fall in Love" is a song featuring words set to the EastEnders theme tune, released on 28 July 1986 by EastEnders actress Anita Dobson, who played the character of Angie Watts. The song was released as a single, reaching No. 4 in the UK singles chart.

The song also features on the album The Simon May Collection and the Peggy's Theme EP, both released in 2010.

== Single ==
The BBC television soap opera EastEnders was first broadcast in February 1985. The show became very popular, along with its theme tune, which was composed by Simon May; executive Leslie Osborne is credited for contractual reasons, but did not contribute to the composition. Don Black was commissioned to add lyrics.

In July 2016, it was revealed that the track was the 12th highest-charting TV theme of all time in the UK.

== Covers ==
Sophie Ellis-Bextor performed a cover of the song at a Soho House venue in White City in 2018. The alternative dance musician Kindness covered the song on their 2012 album World, You Need a Change of Mind.

== In popular culture ==
The single was parodied by Victoria Wood, as an announcement at the end of an edition of Acorn Antiques, within Wood's TV show Victoria Wood As Seen On TV, stated that a single titled "Anyone Can Break A Vase", sung by Miss Babs, was now on sale.

== Charts ==
Chart (1986)	Peak position
Ireland (IRMA)	9
UK Singles (Official Charts)	4
