= Junket 89 =

1970 British children's film by Peter Plummer

- Opening titles
- Directed by: Peter Plummer
- Written by: David Ash
- Produced by: Carole K. Smith
- Starring: Stephen Brassett; John Blundell; Linda Robson
- Cinematography: Tony Imi
- Edited by: Peter K. Smith
- Music by: Harry Robinson
- Production company: Balfour Films
- Release date: 1970
- Running time: 53 minutes
- Country: United Kingdom
- Language: English

Junket 89 is a 1970 British film directed by Peter Plummer and starring Stephen Brassett, John Blundell and Linda Robson. It was written by David Ash and produced by Carole K. Smith for the Children's Film Foundation.

== Plot ==
Science master Mr. Potter has invented the Instant Transportation Machine, and schoolboy Junket transports himself to a South Sea island and back. When the school bullies Boston and Burns kidnap another boy, Boofles, he accidentally transports himself far away and Junket and his friends try to rescue him. On the way they meet an ornithologist and help him to preserve the eggs of the Great Purple Honker.

== Cast ==
- Stephen Brassett as Junket
- John Blundell as O'Fred
- Linda Robson as Daisy
- Mario Renzullo as Boofles
- Freddy Foote as Burns
- John Barrow as Boston
- Caroline North as Dot
- Pauline Quirke as Molly
- Tommy Taylor as Titch
- Christopher Benjamin as headmaster
- Fanny Carby as Mrs Trowser-Legge
- Richard Wilson as Mr Potter
- Paul Nicholson as birdwatcher
- Robert Lankesheer as butler
- Sonia Fox as maid
- children from Anna Scher Children's Theatre in Islington
- Garfield Sobers as himself

== Critical reception ==
The Monthly Film Bulletin wrote: "Although in some respects a comparatively unorthodox children's film (even cutting out the sound in certain sequences for increased dramatic effect), its slow exposition and subsequent mixture of comedy and sci-fi fantasy will probably appear rather too deliberate for adult tastes. But the appearance of Gary Sobers should excite young cricket enthusiasts, and most children should find the Iudicrousness of all the adult characters appealing."

Kine Weekly wrote: "A jolly little tale with lots of lively children, this is sure to amuse small audiences. The story takes a little while to get going, but romps along as soon as Junket gets hold of the transporting machine. The events are, of course, quite farcical, no attempt being made at reality, especially in the chatacters of the adults, all of whom are quite utterly absurd and are played in that mood."
