= Linda Robson =

English actress and television presenter (born 1958)

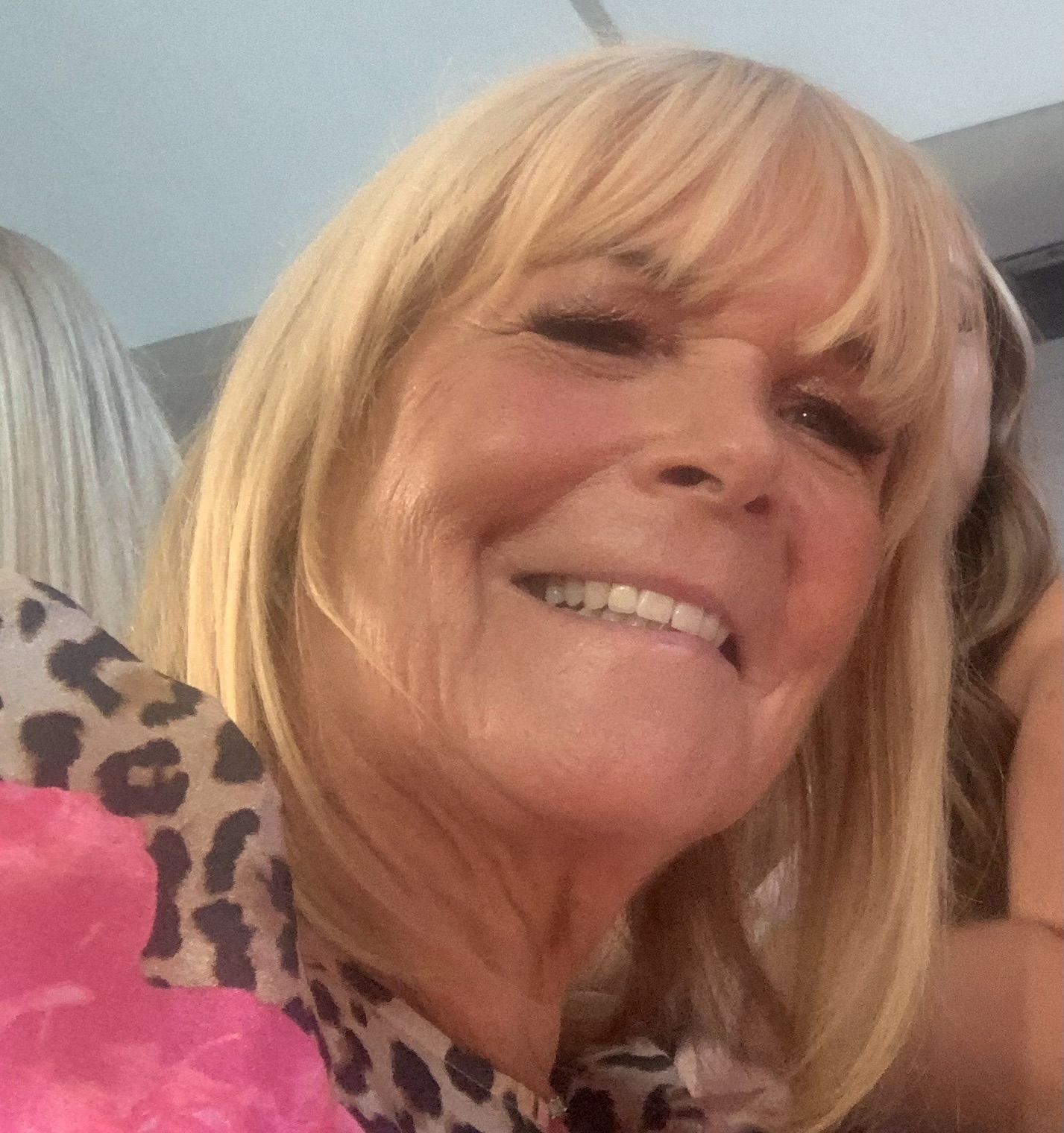
- Linda Robson in 2023
- Born: Linda Patricia Mary Robson; 13 March 1958 (age 68); Islington, North London, England
- Occupations: Actress; television presenter
- Years active: 1970–present
- Television: Birds of a Feather; Loose Women
- Spouse: Mark Dunford (m. 1990; div. 2023)
- Children: 3, including Louis Dunford

Linda Patricia Mary Robson Dunford (née Robson; born 13 March 1958) is an English actress and television presenter. She is best known for playing Tracey Stubbs in the sitcom Birds of a Feather (1989–1998, 2014–2020), and her appearances as a weekly panellist on the ITV series Loose Women (2003, 2010–2025).

As a founder student of Anna Scher's Theatre School, Robson had a significant number of appearances on screen as a child actor.

== Early life ==
Linda Patricia Mary Robson was born on 13 March 1958 in Islington, North London to an English father and an Irish mother. She has two sisters. She was educated at Ecclesbourne Primary School, where Anna Scher started her Theatre School in 1968 with Robson and Pauline Quirke being amongst the founding students. Later she attended the Shelburne Secondary School for Girls, now amalgamated into Highbury Fields School, and The Young Actors Theatre, all in Islington.

== Career ==
=== Early career ===
Robson first appeared on screen in the 1970 film Junket 89 produced by Children's Film Foundation alongside other actors from The Anna Scher Children's Theatre in Islington, including Pauline Quirke. Robson had a minor role as Barbara, a young girl amidst a group of roaming teenagers, in the second series of the original BBC Survivors drama aired in 1976. She appeared in Pauline's Quirkes (her first regular appearance with Pauline Quirke), the drama series The Crezz, the short lived sitcom L for Lester (in 1982), The Agatha Christie Hour (1982) episode 1, as the maid, and the IRA drama Harry's Game. Robson played Maggie Moon in Shine on Harvey Moon, a British comedy drama television series made by Central Television for ITV from 8 January 1982 to 23 August 1985 and briefly revived in 1995 by Meridian.

=== Birds of a Feather ===
Robson played Tracey Stubbs in the BBC sitcom Birds of a Feather from 1989 to 1998, starring with Pauline Quirke and Lesley Joseph.

=== Television ===
Robson subsequently appeared in programmes such as The Bill and Crossroads. Following the success of Birds of a Feather, she appeared again with Pauline Quirke in Jobs for the Girls. She appeared with Jenny Eclair and Dillie Keane in the original cast of Grumpy Old Women Live, a spin-off from the television series Grumpy Old Women, written by Jenny Eclair and Judith Holder. On 9 August 2007, she narrated a show for ITV, called Britain's Youngest Brides. In July 2008, Robson entered Celebrity MasterChef and went out in the first round.

In July 2010, Robson made a guest appearance in BBC drama series Casualty, playing the mother of a young man with bipolar disorder. Robson was the first celebrity to arrive in Australia ahead of the 2012 series of I'm a Celebrity...Get Me Out of Here!, but was voted out on the 13th day in the camp on 23 November 2012, finishing in 9th place.

=== Loose Women ===
Robson made her debut as a guest panellist on Loose Women on 19 August 2003, appearing alongside Kaye Adams, Carol McGiffin & Terri Dwyer. Robson returned to the show as a guest panellist on 2 December 2010, before returning as an occasional panellist from 11 November 2011. Regular panellist Jenny Eclair left the show in June 2012, meaning Robson became a regular panellist on 19 June 2012, replacing Eclair. As of 2016, Robson appears on Loose Women once or twice a week. Robson made three appearances during Series 16, 28 appearances in Series 17, 44 appearances in Series 18, 35 appearances in Series 19, 57 appearances in Series 20, 34 appearances in series 21, 49 appearances in series 22, and for Series 23 Linda made 21 appearances, as of December 2018. Robson did not return after Christmas and was replaced by Brenda Edwards. After a period of absence due to sickness, Linda returned to the panel from 17 January 2020.

=== Birds of a Feather revival ===
In 2013, it was announced that Birds of a Feather was to return for a tenth series, this time airing on the ITV network. The first episode aired on 2 January 2014 to an audience of over 8 million. After a successful tenth series, it was announced in 2014 that Birds of a Feather would return for an eleventh series, which began on 26 December 2014. In March 2015, it was announced that ITV had commissioned a third revived series (twelfth overall) which began airing in January 2016. The next series has been ordered and plans were made to air in 2017. However, filming has yet begun for a full series. Confusion occurred in February 2019, when Nigel Lythgoe seemed to suggest the series had ended. However, an ITV representative later confirmed this was false as reported on digital Spy. ITV have confirmed a new series will air and the hope was to start recording this year to mark 30 years of the sitcom. However, this has since been put on hold due to Lesley Joseph's busy schedule. A 2020 special has been filmed for this Christmas but without Pauline Quirke who has retired from acting to put efforts in to other works.

=== Radio ===
Robson is an occasional guest presenter for BBC London 94.9. In November 2012, she played the part of Lisa, the hypochondriac mother of Luke (Daniel Mays) in Alexander Kirk's play Told You I Was Ill, episode two in the series Living with Mother on BBC Radio 4.

=== Other work ===
In November 2014, Robson was a part of Gareth Malone's 'All Star Choir', who released a cover version of Wake Me Up to raise money for the BBC's Children in Need. The single reached No.1 on the Official UK Singles Chart.

In 2011, Robson appeared in the film Anuvahood as K's mum Pauline. In 2012, Robson took part in the twelfth series of I'm a Celebrity...Get Me Out of Here!, coming in 9th place. On 12 November 2016, Robson appeared on Tipping Point Lucky Stars on ITV.

In 2022, Robson appeared on the seventh series of Celebrity Coach Trip alongside her Birds of a Feather co-star Lesley Joseph.

== Personal life ==
Robson has lived in Islington, London, all her life. She was in a relationship with Tony Tyler for eleven years, with whom she had a daughter Lauren (born 1983). Following their split, she married Mark Dunford in 1990 and they had two children together, singer-songwriter Louis (born 1992) and Roberta (born 1996).

Robson's father was a chain-smoker, who died of lung cancer when he was 57. Her mother also died of cancer in August 2012. In October 2013, Robson voiced an interactive video campaign for the British Lung Foundation aiming to ban smoking in cars with children on board in the United Kingdom, in memory of her father.

Robson is a fan of Boris Johnson and revealed on Loose Women that she used to see and chat with him when he lived in Islington. When it was announced that he had resigned as Prime Minister she said she was sad.

== Stage and screen credits ==
=== Film ===
Year	Title	Role	Notes
1970	Junket 89	Daisy	
1972	Anoop and the Elephant	Linda	
1972	The Trouble with 2B	Daisy	
1974	Malachi's Cove	Girl in Store	Also known as The Seaweed Children
1976	The Likely Lads	Marcia	
1977	The Glitterball	Supermarket Cashier	Uncredited role
1977	The Battle of Billy’s Pond	Sally	
1978	Absolution	Dinner Lady	
2005	The Green Door	Deaf Woman	Short film
2011	Anuvahood	Pauline	
2011	We Need to Talk About Kieran	Television Presenter	
2012	Outside Bet	Lil	
2015	Second Hand Smoke	(unknown)	Short film
2022	Mohan Arms	Nana Elsie	
2023	Sumotherhood	Cockney Woman	
2024	Bermondsey Tales: Fall of the Roman Empire	Kath	

=== Television ===
Year	Title	Role	Notes
1974	The Tomorrow People	Student	Series 2; episodes 1 & 2. Uncredited role
1974	Softly, Softly: Task Force	Papergirl	Series 6; episode 4: "Domestic Incident". Uncredited role
1974, 1975	You Must Be Joking!	Various characters	Pilot episode (1974), & series 1; episode 1 (1975)
1975	Within These Walls	Gillie	Series 2; episode 2: "Remand Wing"
1975	Scene	Susan Cook	Series 7; episode 6: "Mum, Where Are You?"
1975	Against the Crowd	Marilyn	Episode 6: "We Are All Guilty"
1975	It's a Lovely Day Tomorrow	(unknown)	Television film. Uncredited role
1975–1977	Play for Today	Various roles	Series 5–8; 4 episodes
1976	BBC2 Playhouse	Linda	Series 3; episode 3: "A Martyr to the System"
1976	Couples	Sonia	Episodes 73–75
1976	Survivors	Barbara	Series 2; episode 12: "Over the Hills"
1976	Shadows	Girl	Series 2; episode 5: "Peronik". Uncredited role
1976	The Crezz	Linda Smith / Jane Smith	Episodes 5 & 7: "Fire Down Below" & "Gone to the Dogs"
1976	Within These Walls	Pip	Series 4; episode 11: "On Trial"
1976	Pauline's Quirkes	Various	Episodes 2–6
1977	Holding On	Girl in Street	Episode 2
1977	Premiere	Val	Series 1; episode 3: "There's No Place"
1978	Television Club	Jackie	'1978' series: "A School in Time:..."; 9 episodes
1978	The Law Centre	Maureen	Episode 2: "Winning Friends, Losing Lovers"
1978	Tights	(unknown)	Television film
1978	Out	Mo	Episode 3: "Maybe He'll Bring Back a Geisha"
1978	Going to Work	Clare	Episode: "What's the Choice?"
1979	Dick Turpin	Lucy	Series 1; episode 12: "The Hostages"
1979	Thomas & Sarah	Nelly	Episode 12: "The New Rich"
1979	Kids	Linda Platt	Episode 1: "Stephen"
1980	BBC2 Playhouse	Elaine	Series 6; episode 19: "Mary's Wife"
1980	Play for Today	Ann	Series 10; episode 20: "Kate the Good Neighbour"
1980	Ain't Many Angels	(unknown)	Television film
1980	Cribb	Bessie Hardicker	Series 1; episode 5: "The Horizontal Witness"
1980	The Gentle Touch	Chris Adams	Series 2; episode 1: "Something Blue"
1981	A Sharp Intake of Breath	Maureen	Series 4; episode 2: "Match of the Day"
1981	Agony	Mary	Series 3; episode 3: "Hospital Romances"
1981	The Other 'Arf	Sharon	Series 2; episode 2: "Holding the Baby"
1981	Going Out	Gerry Henshaw	Episodes 1–6
1982	BBC2 Playhouse	Sandra	Series 8; episode 29: "Chains"
1982	The Agatha Christie Hour	Edna	Mini-series; episode 1: "The Case of the Middle-aged Wife"
1982	Harry's Game	Theresa McCorrigan	Mini-series; episodes 1 & 2
1982	L for Lester	Jenny	Episodes 1–4 & 6
1982–1985, 1995	Shine on Harvey Moon	Maggie Moon	Main role. Series 1–5; 41 episodes
1983	Up the Elephant and Round the Castle	Cheryl Hawkins	Series 1; episode 2: "May the Best Man Win"
1983	A Pattern of Roses	Pregnant Girl	Television film
1984	Scene	Girl #1	Series 12; episode 9: "If Only"
1987	Lizzie's Pictures	Shirley	Mini-series; episodes 2 & 3
1987	Bad Boyes	Miss King	Series 1; episodes 1–3: "The Slug", "The Slug Returns" & "On the Run"
1987	Elphida	Pregnant English Woman	Television film
1988	The Bill	Janet Simmons	Series 4; episode 17: "Runaround"
1988	Thin Air	Pat	Mini-series; episodes 1–5
1988	South of the Border	Maureen	Series 1; episode 5
1988	CivvyStreet	Flo	Television film
1989–1998, 2014–2020	Birds of a Feather	Tracey Stubbs	Main role. Series 1–12; 129 episodes
1995	Jobs for the Girls	Herself	Episodes 1–5 (with Pauline Quirke)
2003	Crossroads	Wanda Wise	1 episode
2003	The Bill	Michelle Page	Series 19; episode 62: "Pick Your Friends"
2003, 2010–2025	Loose Women	Herself - Panellist	Guest panellist (2003, 2010, 2011). Regular (2012–2018, 2020–present)
2004	The All Star Comedy Show	Various roles	1 of 2 pilots for the series Monkey Trousers
2005	The Fugitives	Bus Passenger	Episode 1. Uncredited role
2006	The Slammer	Sue	Series 1; episode 3
2006	The Bill	Christine Howarth	Series 22; episode 83: "A Stiff Upper Lip"
2010	Casualty	Louise Costello	Series 24; episode 43: "Going Solo"
2012	I'm a Celebrity...Get Me Out of Here!	Herself - Housemate	Series 12; 20 episodes
2013	Common Ground	Michelle	Episode 10: "Barry"
2014	Text Santa 2014	Tracey Stubbs	Television film
2018	Hollyoaks	Herself - Wedding Guest	1 episode
2020	Bad Girls Behind Bars	Herself - Narrator	Series 2; episodes 1–6
2021	Celebs on the Farm	Herself - Contestant	Series 3; 10 episodes
2022	Celebrity Coach Trip	Herself - Contestant	Series 7; episodes 1–15
2022	Richard Osman's House of Games	Herself - Contestant	Series 5; episodes 136–140 (week 24)
2022	Britain Get Singing	Herself - Performer	Television Special
2026	The Good Ship Murder	Elsa Crabtree	Guest role; episode: "Cape Verde"

=== Theatre ===
Year	Title	Role	Notes
1990–1991	Cinderella	Ugly Sister	Hackney Empire
1991–1992	Dick Whittington	Fairy Bowbells	Hackney Empire
1993–1994	Jack and The Beanstalk	Jack	Cambridge Corn Exchange
1995–1996	Cinderella	Fairy Godmother	Reading Hexagon
1997–1998	Cinderella	Fairy Godmother	Ashcroft Theatre
1998–1999	Cinderella	Fairy Godmother	Lewisham Theatre
1999–2000	Peter Pan	Wendy	Milton Keynes Theatre
2000–2001	Peter Pan	Mermaid	Theatre Royal, Stoke-on-Trent
2004–2005	The Vagina Monologues	Various	UK Tour
2004–2005	Snow White and The Seven Dwarfs	Wicked Queen	Harlequinn Theatre, Redhill
2005	Grumpy Old Women	Grump Old Woman	UK Tour
2005–2006	Beauty and The Beast	Wicked Witch	Aylesbury Civic
2006–2007	Snow White and The Seven Dwarfs	Wicked Queen	Broadway Theatre, Catford
2008–2009	Beauty and The Beast	Wicked Witch	Broxburne Civic Theatre
2009–2010	Beauty and The Beast	Wicked Witch	Harlequinn Theatre, Redhill
2010	The Vagina Monologues	Various	UK Tour
2010–2011	Jack and The Beanstalk	Fairy Godmother	Watersmeet, Rickmansworth
2011–2012	Dick Whittington	Fairy Bowbells	Derby Assembly Rooms
2012	Birds of a Feather	Tracy Stubbs	UK Tour
2014–2015	Snow White and The Seven Dwarfs	Wicked Queen	Hayes Beck Theatre
2016–2017	Cinderella	Fairy Godmother	Wycombe Swan, High Wycombe
2020–2021	Cinderella	Fairy Godmother	St Helen's Theatre Royal
2025	Fawlty Towers: The Play	Mrs. Richards	Apollo Theatre, London
