= The Sculptress =

1993 crime novel by Minette Walters

- First edition (UK)
- Author: Minette Walters
- Cover artist: George Underwood
- Language: English
- Genre: Crime / Mystery novel
- Publisher: Macmillan Publishers (UK); St Martins Press (US); Allen & Unwin (Aus)
- Publication date: 23 July 1993
- Publication place: United Kingdom
- Media type: Print (Hardcover, Paperback) & Audio CD
- Pages: 480 pp (paperback)
- ISBN: 0-330-33037-3
- OCLC: 59808634

The Sculptress is a crime novel by English writer Minette Walters published in 1993. She won an Edgar and a Macavity Award for the book. The novel was adapted as a BBC-TV series in 1996, starring Pauline Quirke as Olive Martin.

== Synopsis ==
Olive Martin – a 28-year-old, morbidly obese woman – was imprisoned for life after police found her cradling the shattered bodies of her mother and sister, having previously dismembered them and rearranged their limbs into abstract shapes on the floor, a crime for which she was nicknamed "the Sculptress". Troubled journalist Rosalind Leigh, under pressure from her publisher to produce new material, reluctantly agrees to write a book about Olive and – whilst conducting interviews with the prisoner – gradually comes to believe that she is concealing something, maybe even her own innocence. In her quest to discover the truth Rosalind enlists the help of Hal Hawksley. He is an ex-policeman who originally investigated the case and is still haunted by some of its aspects.

== Television adaptation ==
In 1996, this story was adapted for television by the BBC. The cast featured Pauline Quirke as Olive, Caroline Goodall as Rosalind and Christopher Fulford as Hal.
