= Beasts (TV series) =

1976 British TV anthology series

- Genre: Horror anthology
- Created by: Nigel Kneale
- Starring: Anthony Bate; Martin Shaw; Pauline Quirke; Michael Kitchen; Patrick Magee
- Country of origin: United Kingdom
- Original language: English
- No. of series: 1
- No. of episodes: 6

Production
- Producer: Nicholas Palmer
- Running time: c. 50 minutes

Original release
- Network: ITV
- Release: 16 October – 20 November 1976

Beasts is a 1976 British television series. Written by Nigel Kneale, it is an anthology of six self-contained episodes that feature the recurring theme of bestial horror. The series was made by ATV for the ITV Network.

== Format ==
Each episode was based around some form of bestial horror while avoiding typical monster horror clichès, more so focusing on psychological and supernatural themes. For example, "The Dummy" and "What Big Eyes" are psychological horrors focusing on men who think they are the creatures they obsess over, and "Buddy Boy", "Special Offer" and "Baby" have supernatural elements. "During Barty's Party" is the only episode to have actual 'beasts' as the main threat, namely large rats.

== Episodes ==
No.	Title	Original release date
1	"Special Offer"	16 October 1976
Pauline Quirke stars as a shop assistant whose unrequited love for her manager prompts a paranormal revenge.
2	"During Barty's Party"	23 October 1976
Starring Anthony Bate, a middle-class couple's life becomes overturned by rats.
3	"Buddyboy"	30 October 1976
Featuring Martin Shaw and a disused aquarium haunted by the spirit of a dolphin.
4	"Baby"	6 November 1976
Starring Simon MacCorkindale as a newlywed whose wife's pregnancy falls foul of ancient witchcraft.
5	"What Big Eyes"	13 November 1976
Features Michael Kitchen as an RSPCA inspector investigating a man (Patrick Magee) who is trying to turn himself into a wolf.
6	"The Dummy"	20 November 1976
Shows the psychological effect on an actor (Bernard Horsfall) who regularly plays a monster in horror films.

== DVD release ==
The series was released on DVD by Network in 2006. This set also included a similarly themed TV play called Murrain that Kneale had written for ITV's Against the Crowd series in 1975.
