= Stephen Butcher (director) =

British television director

- Born: 23 February 1946 (age 80); Northampton, England, UK
- Occupation: Television Director

Stephen Butcher (born 1946) is a British television director (Coronation Street, Emmerdale, Eldorado, others). He was educated at the William Ellis Grammar School and at the University of Cambridge.
