= Pauline Quirke =

English actress (born 1959)

Pauline Quirke MBE
- Born: Pauline Perpetua Quirke; 8 July 1959 (age 67); Hackney, London, England
- Occupations: Actress; writer
- Years active: 1970–2022
- Television: Birds of a Feather (1989–1998, 2014–2017); Emmerdale (2010–2012); Broadchurch (2013–2015)
- Spouse: Steve Sheen (m. 1996)
- Children: 2, including Charlie
- Website: paulinequirke.com

Pauline Perpetua Sheen (née Quirke; born 8 July 1959) is a retired English actress. She began her career with roles on various television series, before fronting her own comedy sketch show, Pauline's Quirkes, in 1976. She later starred as Vicky Smith on the BBC drama series Angels (1982–1983), and achieved fame with her portrayal of Sharon Theodopolopodous on the long-running sitcom Birds of a Feather (1989–1998, 2014–2017), for which she won a British Comedy Award and was nominated on three occasions for a National Television Award. In 1997, she was nominated for the BAFTA Award for Best Actress for her role in the BBC miniseries The Sculptress. Between 2010 and 2012, Quirke played Hazel Rhodes on the ITV soap opera Emmerdale.

Quirke's film appearances include The Elephant Man (1980), Little Dorrit (1987), and Getting It Right (1989). Other television credits include Shine on Harvey Moon (1984–1985, 1995), Maisie Raine (1998–1999), David Copperfield (1999), Down to Earth (2000–2003), Cold Blood (2007–2008), Missing (2009–2010), Skins (2010), Broadchurch (2013–2015), and You, Me and the Apocalypse (2015).

== Life and career ==
=== Early work ===
Quirke began her career as a child actress with an appearance in Dixon of Dock Green. Another early role was that of an autistic teenager in the 1975 TV drama Jenny Can't Work Any Faster.

By 1976, she had her own TV show, Pauline's Quirkes, on Thames Television, which featured pop music, teenage topics, and comedy sketches. This was also the first television show in which Quirke and Linda Robson appeared together regularly. In 1976, she played the lead role in the "Special Offer" episode of ATV's Beasts, by Nigel Kneale, also starring Wensley Pithey and Martin Shaw. Quirke also had a small role in the movie The Elephant Man in 1980. Quirke played Veronica in Shine on Harvey Moon in 1982.

Quirke's big break came in 1989, when she began playing the part of Sharon Theodopolopodous in the BBC sitcom Birds of a Feather with Linda Robson and Lesley Joseph. The series ran on the BBC from 1989 to 1998 and was resurrected on ITV between 2014 and 2017, with the final episode in December 2020 in which Quirke did not appear.

=== Later work ===
From 1994 to 1999, Quirke appeared in a series of Surf adverts with Linda Robson, and the pair worked together on the BBC documentary series Jobs for the Girls. In 1996, she starred in the BBC television adaptation of The Sculptress by Minette Walters, receiving much critical acclaim for her performance, including a British Academy TV Award nomination for Best Actress. When Birds of a Feather ended, Quirke began playing DI Maisie Raine in Maisie Raine, a drama series for BBC One, which ran in 1998 and 1999.

From 2000 to 2003, Quirke starred opposite Warren Clarke in the BBC series Down to Earth. She made a return to comedy in 2000 when she starred with Neil Stuke, Robert Daws and Pippa Haywood in BBC sitcom Office Gossip. After a start with over six million viewers, the show found its ratings dropped and it was cancelled after only one series. However, Quirke was nominated for Most Popular Comedy Performer at the National Television Awards for her role. In 2002, she starred alongside Nitin Ganatra in Being April, a comedy drama for BBC One. Quirke appeared in Carrie's War in 2004 and in 2005, played a major role in The Bill as Cath Wilson, a woman wrongly convicted of murdering a child.

In 2006, Quirke played Colleen McCabe in The Thieving Headmistress and in 2008, she appeared in an episode of My Family as Sharon the Bank Robber. Quirke has frequently been seen in the audience of Strictly Come Dancing and has appeared on its companion show It Takes Two more than once. She was a contestant on BBC's Celebrity MasterChef in June 2007, but was disqualified for creating a dish that was described by Loyd Grossman as "in no way resembling a meal".

In 2007, Quirke set up The Pauline Quirke Academy of Performing Arts, which opened at various locations across the UK as an extracurricular centre for young people who want to learn performing arts. The academy operates at over 200 locations in the United Kingdom.

In 2009 and 2010, she played the lead role in the BBC daytime drama series Missing as DS Mary Jane "MJ" Croft, head of a Missing Persons Unit. In May 2010, it was announced that Quirke would be joining the rural soap opera Emmerdale as Hazel Rhodes, the mother of established character, Jackson Walsh. Quirke said, "I've never done anything like this before so it's something different for me and I'm very happy to be a part of it." On 16 May 2011, it was announced that Quirke had decided to quit Emmerdale. Her character left on 25 January 2012.

From 2013 to 2015, Quirke had a recurring role as Susan Wright in ITV drama series Broadchurch, appearing in all eight episodes of the first series and returning to feature in two of the eight episodes of the second series. Her pet Labrador, Bailey, also appeared in the programme. She was a guest panellist on Loose Women on two occasions. In 2015, she played the role of Paula Winton in the ten-part comedy thriller You, Me and the Apocalypse for Sky1.

Quirke decided not to be involved in the final episode of Birds of a Feather in December 2020. This was explained at the time as her preference to concentrate on her Performing Arts Academies but it was later explained that in November 2020 she was already showing signs of suffering with the dementia that prompted her retirement, which was announced in 2025.

=== Charity work ===
Quirke is an honorary member of the NSPCC, supports the charities Children with Leukaemia, Children in Crisis and Children’s Hospices UK. She is a patron of Rennie Grove Hospice.

== Personal life ==
Quirke has two children with her husband Steve Sheen, a producer who also worked on Birds of a Feather as an executive producer from 2014 until 2017. Their son, Charlie, appeared as Travis in Birds of a Feather from 2014 until 2017.

Quirke was appointed Member of the Order of the British Empire (MBE) in the 2022 Birthday Honours for services to young people, the entertainment industry and charity.

In 2025, Quirke's husband announced that she would be retiring from all professional and commercial duties due to a diagnosis of dementia, which she had received in 2021.

== Filmography ==
| Year | Title | Role | Notes |
|---|---|---|---|
| 1970 | Junket 89 | Molly | Main role |
| 1971 | Dixon of Dock Green | Jane Taylor | 1 episode |
| 1971 | Softly, Softly: Task Force | Janice West | 1 episode |
| 1972 | The Problem with 2B | Molly | Main role |
| 1973 | Malachi's Cove | Store Girl | Supporting role |
| 1974 | The Tomorrow People | Student | Recurring role (3 episodes) |
| 1974 | Play for Today | Checkout Girl | 1 episode |
| 1975 | Shadows | Dawn | 1 episode |
| 1975 | Jenny Can't Work Any Faster | Jenny | Television film |
| 1975–1976 | You Must Be Joking! | Various | (3 episodes) |
| 1976 | Beasts | Noreen Beale | 1 episode |
| 1976 | Pauline's Quirkes | Herself - presenter | 6 episodes |
| 1976–1983 | Angels | Kate Morahan/Vicky Smith | Regular roles (66 episodes) |
| 1977 | Television Club | Pud | Regular role (6 episodes) |
| 1977 | The Duchess of Duke Street | Pearl | (2 episodes) |
| 1978 | Crown Court | Patsy Donovan | 1 episode |
| 1979 | Lovely Couple | Carole Richards | Regular role (11 episodes) |
| 1980 | Ain't Many Angels | Various | Television film |
| 1980 | The Further Adventures of Oliver Twist | Charlotte | Regular role (9 episodes) |
| 1980 | Both Ends Meet | Cissy White | Television film |
| 1980 | The Elephant Man | 2nd Whore | Minor role |
| 1982 | Play for Today | Eleanor | 1 episode |
| 1982 | The Story of the Treasure Seekers | Eliza | Regular role (6 episodes) |
| 1982 | The Return of the Soldier | Girl in Hospital | Minor role |
| 1982 | Q.E.D | Jane | 1 episode |
| 1984–1995 | Shine on Harvey Moon | Veronica | Recurring roles (13 episodes) |
| 1986 | Girls on Top | Cleaner | 1 episode |
| 1987 | Hardwicke House | Gladys | 1 episode |
| 1987 | Little Dorrit | Maggie | Supporting role |
| 1988 | Rockliffe's Babies | Lorraine Morelli | 1 episode |
| 1988 | Distant Voices, Still Lives | Doreen | Supporting role |
| 1988 | Casualty | Mary Taylor | 1 episode |
| 1989 | Getting It Right | Muriel Sutton | Supporting role |
| 1989–1998, 2014–2017 | Birds of a Feather | Sharon Theodopolopodous | Main role (128 episodes) |
| 1995–1996 | Jackanory | Storyteller | 2 episodes |
| 1996 | The Sculptress | Olive Martin | Main role (4 episodes) |
| 1996 | Waiting for Giro | Bo | Short film |
| 1997 | Our Boy | Sonia Williamson | Television film |
| 1997 | The Canterville Ghost | Madame Murielle | Television film |
| 1997 | Deadly Summer | Linda Topping | Television film |
| 1998–1999 | Maisie Raine | D.I. Maisie Raine | Main role (12 episodes) |
| 1998–1999 | Real Women | Mandy Evans | Regular role (7 episodes) |
| 1999 | Last Christmas | Gwen | Television film |
| 1999 | David Copperfield | Peggotty | Main role (2 episodes) |
| 1999 | Real Women 2 | Mandy Evans | Main role |
| 2000 | Checkout Girl | Lynda | Short film |
| 2000–2003 | Down to Earth | Faith | Regular role (18 episodes) |
| 2001 | Office Gossip | Jo | Regular role (6 episodes) |
| 2001 | Arthur's Dyke | Janet | Main role |
| 2001 | Randall and Hopkirk (Deceased) | Felia Siderova | 1 episode |
| 2001 | Redemption Road | Joan | Supporting role |
| 2002 | Murder in Mind | Jane Saunders | 1 episode |
| 2002 | Being April | April | Regular role (6 episodes) |
| 2004 | Carrie's War | Hepzibah Green | Television film |
| 2004 | North & South | Dixon | Regular role (4 episodes) |
| 2005 | The Bill | Cathy Wilson | Recurring role (5 episodes) |
| 2006 | The Thieving Headmistress | Colleen McCabe | Television film |
| 2006 | Casualty | Jackie Rogers | 1 episode |
| 2007–2008 | Cold Blood | D.I. Hazel Norton | Recurring role (4 episodes) |
| 2008 | My Family | Joan | 1 episode |
| 2009–2010 | Missing | D.S. Mary Jane Croft | Regular role (15 episodes) |
| 2010 | Skins | D.S. Blunt | Recurring role (3 episodes) |
| 2010 | The Perfect Burger | Mrs. Grieves | Supporting role |
| 2010–2012 | Emmerdale | Hazel Rhodes | Regular role (222 episodes) |
| 2013 | Grace's Story | Nat | Short film |
| 2013–2015 | Broadchurch | Susan Wright | Recurring role (10 episodes) |
| 2015 | You, Me and the Apocalypse | Paula | Regular role (6 episodes) |

== Selected stage credits ==
| Year | Title | Role | Notes |
|---|---|---|---|
| 1990–1991 | Cinderella | Ugly Sister | Hackney Empire |
| 1991–1992 | Dick Whittington | Dick | Hackney Empire |
| 2012 | Birds of a Feather | Sharon Theodopolopodous | UK Tour |
| 2016–2017 | Cinderella | Fairy Godmother | Beck Theatre |

== Awards and nominations ==
| Year | Nominated For | Award | Category | Result |
|---|---|---|---|---|
| 1990 | Birds of a Feather | British Comedy Awards | Best TV Comedy Newcomer | Won |
| 1990 | Birds of a Feather | British Comedy Awards | Best TV Comedy Actress | Nominated |
| 1997 | The Sculptress | BAFTA TV Awards | Best Actress | Nominated |
| 1997 | Birds of a Feather | National Television Awards | Most Popular Comedy Performer | Nominated |
| 1998 | Birds of a Feather | National Television Awards | Most Popular Actress | Nominated |
| 1999 | Birds of a Feather | National Television Awards | Most Popular Comedy Performer | Nominated |
| 2001 | Office Gossip | National Television Awards | Most Popular Comedy Performer | Nominated |
| 2002 | Down to Earth | National Television Awards | Most Popular Actress | Nominated |
| 2011 | Emmerdale | British Soap Awards | Best Newcomer | Nominated |
| 2011 | Emmerdale | TV Choice Awards | Best Soap Actress | Nominated |
| 2011 | Emmerdale | Inside Soap Awards | Best Actress | Nominated |
| 2011 | Emmerdale | Inside Soap Awards | Best Newcomer | Nominated |
| 2013 | Broadchurch | Crime Thriller Awards | Best Supporting Actress Dagger | Nominated |
