= Jobs for the Girls =

- Directed by: Nick Handel; Pat Holland
- Starring: Linda Robson, Pauline Quirke
- Theme music composer: Simon May
- Country of origin: United Kingdom
- Original language: English
- No. of series: 1
- No. of episodes: 5

Production
- Producers: Nick Handel; Pat Holland
- Editor: Chris Wright

Original release
- Network: BBC One
- Release: 23 February – 27 December 1995

Jobs for the Girls is a BBC television documentary series in which actors Linda Robson and Pauline Quirke learned about a new profession in each episode. It ran in 1995 for one series of four episodes, followed by a Christmas special.

The show included guest appearances from Ian Botham, Roger Daltrey, Sarah, Duchess of York, and Lesley Garrett.

The theme music was composed by Simon May, and included on his album New Vintage: The Best of Simon May.

== Episodes ==
No.	Title	Directed by	Original release date
1	"Pauline and Linda Show at Crufts"	Nick Handel	23 February 1995
Linda and Pauline learn how to handle Old English Sheepdogs for the Crufts international dog show
2	"Pauline and Linda Chase a Story"	Nick Handel and Pat Holland	2 March 1995
Linda and Pauline discover the world of journalism, and are tasked with chasing a story for The Guardian.
3	"Pauline and Linda Get a Bite"	Nick Handel	9 March 1995
The pair have to captain two teams of anglers in a freshwater and deep-sea fishing match. Roger Daltrey and Ian Botham also appear.
4	"Pauline and Linda In Concert"	Nick Handel	23 March 1995
Pauline and Linda have to train as classical opera singers and perform "Rule, Britannia!" at an English Heritage open-air concert Kenwood House in North London alongside Lesley Garrett. During their training, they are supported by fellow Birds of a Feather actor Peter Polycarpou.
5	"Pauline and Linda Plan a Party"	Nick Handel	27 December 1995
The pair are tasked for planning a fundraising glittering ball at the Naval and Military Club, London, for Sarah, Duchess of York's charity Children in Crisis. Features guest appearances by Curtis Stigers, Anneka Rice, Loyd Grossman, Raymond Blanc, Bobby Davro, Rolf Harris, Eric Knowles, and Tony Blackburn.
