= Simon's Way =

Studio album by The Simon May Orchestra
- Released: 1986
- Genre: Soundtrack
- Label: BBC Records
- Producer: Simon May; Bruce Talbot; Dave Hewson; Stew James; Brad James; John Stax

The Simon May Orchestra chronology
Simon's Way	New Vintage: The Best of Simon May

Simon's Way is an album by Britain's The Simon May Orchestra and released in 1986. Anita Dobson, who also starred in the television show EastEnders sings the theme to the show ("Anyone Can Fall In Love"). Marti Webb sings the theme to the television show Howards' Way ("Always There").

== Track listing ==
1. "Howard's Way"
2. "Howard's Way" (Variation on the theme)
3. "Orrin (New England)"
4. "Frere"
5. "Abbey's Theme"
6. "The Tarrant Set"
7. "Barracuda"
8. "Always There" (with Marti Webb)
9. "Anyone Can Fall in Love" (with Anita Dobson)
10. "In the Warm of a Brand New Day" (with Matthew Padden & Dotheboys Hall)
11. "Holiday Suite"
12. "EastEnders" (Variation on the Theme) (Julia's Theme)
13. "EastEnders"
14. "Every Loser Wins" Vocal by Nick Berry (Extra track on cassette TCREB 594)
