= Smike =

- libretto cover
- Music: Roger Holman and Simon May
- Lyrics: Roger Holman and Simon May
- Book: Simon May and Clive Barnett
- Basis: Nicholas Nickleby
- Productions: BBC TV

Smike is a pop musical adaptation of a small part of Charles Dickens' 1839 novel Nicholas Nickleby, that was televised for the BBC in 1973. The musical is based on the character Smike from that novel. The TV production starred Beryl Reid as Mrs Squeers, Andrew Keir as Mr Squeers, Leonard Whiting as Nicholas, and Ian Sharrock as Smike. The original cast also featured DJ Neil Fox, a pupil at Kingston Grammar, as one of the schoolboys. A cast album was released on Pye records, including the songs from that production, but not all of the songs used in the stage version. The complete score was re-recorded in 1983 and released on a double album featuring Jill Gascoine, Oliver Tobias and Mike Holoway.

It was originally devised in 1973 at Kingston Grammar School by two teachers, Simon May, who became a successful television composer, and Clive Barnett. The songwriting partner was Roger Holman.

Songs include "Don't Let Life Get You Down" and "In the Warm Light of a Brand New Day". "We'll Find Our Day" was recorded by Mark Rattray and Emma Robbins, and featured on the album New Vintage: The Best of Simon May. Simon May's 1977 album Summer of My Life included "Don't Let Life Get You Down" and "In the Warm Light of a Brand New Day", with the latter also featured on his album Simon's Way. '"Parents"/"Better Off The Way I Am" was included on May's 2010 compilation album The Simon May Collection.

== Plot synopsis ==
Act 1 A young boy, Smeeton/Smike, sits alone in a class of empty desks. Soon, the rest of the class files in and the Headmaster reads out the Daily Test. The children, however, voice out their reactions to the test (the Headmaster cannot hear them) rather than writing down their answers. At the end of the test, the children hand in their papers to the drama mistress, Miss Grant ("Daily Test Chant") before expressing how they feel about school ("Doing Things By Numbers"). The Headmaster then introduces the class's new English teacher, Mr. Nicholls, before punishing Smeeton who has forgotten to rule a line at the end of his work. The Headmaster and Miss Grant show Nicholls to the book cupboard, leaving the children alone.

Tubby, a bully, taunts Smeeton and a fight starts. Nicholls breaks up the fight, and informs the class they will be looking at Nicholas Nickleby. The children are not happy. Nicholls tells them the story of a young man named Nicholas Nickleby, who is sent by his uncle to teach in a school run by a cruel and vicious headmaster by the name of Squeers. The children notice that they are in a similar situation, and ask why they should listen to Nicholls, as nobody ever listens to them. ("Here I Am"). The Headmaster and Miss Grant overhear the commotion, and Nicholls explains that he was getting the children interested by turning Nicholas Nickleby into a musical. The Headmaster and Miss Grant are not convinced, but Nicholls explains the character of Squeers to the Headmaster, convincing him to play the part. The Headmaster is a little more convinced, and the children flick through their books to see what characters they can play. It is decided that Miss Grant will play Squeers' daughter, Fanny, and that Smeeton, much to his dismay, will play Smike. Smeeton gives in, but only if Nicholls plays Nicholas Nickleby, which is agreed ("Stop! And Just Think Who You Could Be").

The scene then transforms to The Saracen's Head, a 19th-Century pub. Squeers is in London recruiting pupils for his school, Dotheboys Hall. He is accompanied by three frightened-looking boys. Suddenly, one of them sneezes, and Squeers rounds on him. Richard, the landlord of the Saracen's Head, announces that a gentleman is here to speak to Squeers. Mr. Snawley enters, saying that he wishes to enroll his two sons in Dotheboys Hall. Squeers accepts, and ensures Snawley that he will ensure the boys are in good hands and will achieve the best of their abilities ("We've Got The Youngsters' Interests at Heart").

Ralph Nickleby and his nephew Nicholas Nickleby enter, and Ralph recollects the time that a young boy named Dorker died at Dotheboys Hall. He then changes the subject, having noticed an advertisement in a newspaper for an able assistant to Squeers, and says that Nicholas should apply. At first Squeers objects to this decision, saying that Nicholas is too young and without a college degree, but Ralph reminds Squeers that he did not inform Ralph of Dorker's death until years after he died; thus Ralph must have still been paying Squeers for Dorker's education while he was dead. Squeers changes his mind and employs Nicholas, informing him they will depart for Dotheboys Hall the following morning.

Squeers and Nicholas arrive at the gates at Dotheboys Hall. Squeers calls for Smike, a skinny boy who works as a slave to the Squeers family. He treats Smike poorly before asking him to fetch the luggage. Squeers then introduces Nicholas to his wife, Mrs. Squeers, who helps him run the school. She immediately takes a disliking to Nicholas. Nicholas is then introduced to the Squeers' children, Fanny and Wackford. Squeers tries to show that his family is perfect, but Nicholas knows they are far from it ("Wackford, Fanny, Squeersy And Me").

Squeers then introduces Nicholas to the boys, who look more like sewer rats than human beings. He states that Mrs. Squeers is like a mother to the boys, and that the school is filled with love and charity, but Nicholas can see that the boys are treated poorly ("Dotheboys Hall"). Nicholas is shocked when he sees that the boys are restricted to drinking a jug of water and only when Squeers calls their number ("Doing Thing By Numbers (Reprise)".

Once the boys are sent to bed, Nicholas dines with the Squeers family, unaware that Fanny is attracted to him. Smike, who is serving them dinner, asks Squeers if anything has been heard about him, but is dismissed whilst treated cruelly. Nicholas feels that he is eating a meal that many go without, and Squeers explains that they prepare the boys for a life in the real world. Smike returns, this time with ale, but Squeers considers him lazy for taking his time, and beats Smike until he is left in a heap on the floor. After dinner, Squeers tells Nicholas to sleep in the living room until more permanent arrangements can be made. Nicholas hears Smike reflecting on his situation ("Better Off The Way I Am") and comforts him. Smike explains that he was with Dorker when he died and remembers seeing smiling faces upon Dorker. Smike is troubled that nobody would smile upon him when he dies, and that he will never find his family. Nicholas comforts him, saying there is always hope ("Don't Let Life Get You Down").

== Song list ==
Act I

- The Daily Test (Headmaster & Boys)
- Doing Things By Numbers (Boys)^^
- Here I Am (Nicholls & Boys)
- Stop! And Just Think Who You Could Be... (Boys)^
- We've Got The Youngsters' Interests at Heart (Squeers & Snawley)
- Wackford, Fanny, Squeersy And Me (Squeers, Mrs. Squeers, Fanny & Wackford)^^
- Dotheboys Hall (Squeers, Mrs. Squeers & Boys)
- Doing Things By Numbers [Reprise] (Boys)^^
- Better Off The Way I Am (Smike)^^
- Don't Let Life Get You Down (Nicholas & Boys)

Act II

- In the Warm Light of a Brand New Day (Smike)
- Dotheboys Rock (Bolder & Boys)
- Brimstone And Treacle (Mrs. Squeers & Boys)
- Your Kind of Woman (Mrs. Squeers & Nicholas)^^
- We'll Find Our Day (Fanny & Nicholas)
- Here I Am [Reprise] (Nicholas & Boys)
- Don't Let Life Get You Down/In The Warm Light of a Brand New Day [Reprise] (Smeeton & Boys)
- Believe (Nicholls & Boys)^^

- ^The song "Stop! And Just Think Who You Could Be" has an optional additional verse for productions with both boys and girls.
- ^^These songs were not in the original BBC 1973 production. The song "Dotheboys Hall" occurred in the Saracen's Head scene in the BBC production, before "We've Got The Youngster's Interests at Heart".

== Productions ==
The show has subsequently been staged many times by youth drama groups and amateur dramatic societies around the UK.
