= EastEnders theme tune =

Theme tune for the BBC soap opera EastEnders

"EastEnders"

Instrumental

from the album Simon's Way
- Recorded: 1983–1984
- Genre: Theme music
- Composers: Simon May; Leslie Osborne

Audio sample
- The beginning of the EastEnders theme tune, including its distinctive drum fill: file; help

The EastEnders theme tune was composed by the British composer Simon May. Leslie Osborne has a contractual composer credit, but did not contribute to the composition or recording.

The theme, which is written in the key of E-flat major, was largely based upon percussion instruments, strings and the piano.

It was widely known for its dramatic use of sound, namely the drum beat that begins at the end of an episode that add a sense of importance, suspense and drama to the cliff-hanger. This in itself has been parodied and used in other television programmes, for example in the Friends spoof 'Chums' that featured on SMTV Live. The drum fill was written and played by Graham Broad.

The theme has become widely recognised. A 2008 poll by PRS for Music cited it as the most recognisable piece of music in the UK, beating the national anthem "God Save the King".

The theme tune was nominated for an Ivor Novello Awards in 1985 for Best TV Theme and in 1987 it won the Television and Radio Industries Club Award for Best TV Theme Music.

== Inception ==
Composer Simon May was introduced to Associated Television executive Leslie Osborne in 1976. Several years later, in 1982, Osborne introduced May to television producer Gerard Glaister; consequently, May was commissioned to write the themes to Skorpion and Cold Warrior. Writer Tony Holland, was impressed with May's work on Cold Warrior, and got in touch with the composer through Osborne.

They wanted something universal, almost feelgood to contrast with Albert Square and its gritty tough storylines. They needed a magic hooky tune with multi-ethnic colours as well as something that encapsulated the warmth of the Cockney character.

— Simon May

May met with Julia Smith and Tony Holland, who were developing a new soap opera for BBC One, then titled E8 (which was later renamed EastEnders). May was told that EastEnders was going to be an edgy drama, and came up with a piece of music that reflected that, but it was rejected because it was too dark. Producers wanted something melodic, "to bring people in from the kitchen or garden", and wanted it be "more feel-good" to contrast with the actual programme. May looked at his Cockney friends and felt they were "warm and loyal" people, so said his inspiration came from "my subliminal understanding of what the Cockney character is about." He offered an attempt that conveyed everything about the East End that the producers wanted; "bells, whistles, hand-claps, sitars, steelpan and an underlying feel of being on a merry-go-round."

The theme was composed solely by May. Executive Leslie Osborne was given a 'writer' credit because he was responsible for "getting the gig", but May says that he "didn't write a single note". May says, "I could have possibly have insisted on retaining the copyright of EastEnders for myself, but if I had done so, I would have probably have lost the Howards' Way commission." May actually began writing the music that was used for the theme tune when he was seven years old, around 34 years before EastEnders first aired, and based it on the scales that his music teacher had taught him.

The drum beats at the start of the theme tune were played by May's drummer, Graham Broad. May had originally composed a longer theme that featured a section in "a true cockney piano-type style" and he asked Broad for a drum "fill" to allow the theme to switch back to the main version. Smith and Holland heard it and assumed it was for the end titles. The drum beats are commonly known as the "doof doofs" or "duff duffs" and it is used to signify a cliffhanger at the end of an episode, commonly known as a "duff duff moment", for which the camera remains focussed on the face of the character receiving the "duff duff moment" for around four seconds.

All of the chords used in the piece of music are diatonic and chromatic, with no diatonic and chromatic alterations; it has been said that this "adds to the directness of the music". The main melody is scored for a piano, which has been described as having a "pub sing-a-long feel" to it. The tune is also doubled by a whistle, and there are two rhythmic permeations, a dotted quarter note-eighth note moving the music forward, and a two-quaver hand-clap on the fourth beat of every other bar.

== Title music and hits ==
The original title music was used until 1991. A stereo version was introduced in July 1988 for Omnibus editions, although it was mainly used for 4 months in 1991 before a new version came into use, sounding much closer to the original, this version having a slightly different ending.

On 11 May 1993, a completely new recording was instated which was jazzier than the previous version. The famous "doof doofs" were significantly tweaked. This version of the music proved unpopular with viewers but was used on screen for 11 months.

From 11 April 1994, the synth drums that preceded the closing theme were added to the beginning of the opening theme. The new theme at the time was a version based on the original, with more up to date elements. This was the longest-lasting version to date, being used for 15 years before another revamp took place.

From 7 September 2009, the theme tune was rescored by May to include stronger drum beats and more background percussion.

The theme has also been remixed into a much slower and less dramatic version for use with EastEnders Revealed and a rock version for use with EastEnders Xtra. Subsequent spin-offs Ricky & Bianca, Perfectly Frank and EastEnders: Slaters in Detention have used the softer guitar version. 2010 internet spin-off EastEnders: E20 features a new remix of the theme tune, which was chosen by producer Deborah Sathe, executive producer Diederick Santer, Simon May, director Michael Keillor and BBC Radio 1Xtra's DJ Ace from entries in a competition launched on Annie Mac's BBC Radio 1 show. The winner was announced on 4 December 2009 as Carl Darling.

DJ Osymyso—known for remixing popular culture—produced a mashup version of the theme, which turned the infamous fight between Peggy Mitchell and Pat Butcher into a breakbeat dance track. The theme was part of a routine by stand-up comedy Bill Bailey during his Bewilderness shows. Bailey describes how depressing he finds the theme and imagines lyrics he feels are fitting: "Everyone is going to die/We're all gonna die/In a variety of different ways". He then proceeds to supply an alternative version of the theme which he feels is more appropriate, embodying the multicultural nature of the East End of London by using mode, sitar and tabla. In 2009, American alternative metal band Faith No More performed the theme tune at the Reading and Leeds Festivals.

=== Songs ===
In 1986, the lyricist Don Black added lyrics to the tune to create the song "Anyone Can Fall in Love". It was sung by EastEnders cast member Anita Dobson, who portrayed Angie Watts in the programme. It reached number four on the UK singles chart, and Dobson appeared on Top of the Pops. Marti Webb, who recorded "Always There", May's theme to Howards' Way, covered "Anyone Can Fall in Love" on her album Always There.

In 1988, the tune had another set of lyrics added to produce a hymn called "Glory Be To God On High", which was performed on the BBC's Songs of Praise.

The 1993 "jazzy" arrangement spawned another vocal version (Sharon Benson's "I'll Always Believe in You").

In 2010, in the lead up to the programmes's silver anniversary, Patsy Palmer (Bianca) and Sid Owen (Ricky) appeared on Alan Carr's guest talk programme for an interview and decided to have a "knees up" around the piano, doing their own version of "Anyone Can Fall in Love"; this proved to be popular with the audience. It included a glass statue of "Wellard", Bianca's half-brother Robbie's dog, singing along.

=== Other versions ===
A medley of the theme songs from EastEnders and Howards' Way was recorded by The Shadows and reached No. 86 on the UK singles chart in December 1986. A jazzy swing music version was used for the 1988 spinoff CivvyStreet.

According to PRS for Music it has 99 different recordings of the EastEnders theme tune registered on its system.

== Julia's Theme ==
"Julia's Theme"
"Julia's Theme", an occasionally used introduction to the main theme.

"Julia's Theme" refers to an alternative version of the usual theme, which was named after one of the show's creators, Julia Smith. It has been used in place of the regular theme 78 times as of 14 September 2026. This theme sees a change to the way an episode ends. Normally an episode ends with drums which are known to many as "doof doofs" or "duff duffs". Julia's Theme, created for gentle, sad or romantic endings, ends an episode with a slow buildup played on piano, usually for a particularly emotional event. When "Julia's Theme" played for the first time in 1985, it was over the final moments of a gentle scene between Ian Beale (Adam Woodyatt) and his grandmother Lou Beale (Anna Wing). The first full-length version of the theme was heard in the 3 October 1985 episode where Michelle Fowler (Susan Tully) tells Den Watts (Leslie Grantham) that she is pregnant with his unborn baby and the pair agree to keep the child's paternity secret.

There have been a few variations of the music used during its run, the original being used regularly from 1985 to 1987 before being used in 1992 and once in 1993, and a final time in 1996. An updated version of this theme was introduced in 2001 and lasted until 2006. The third version of this theme was introduced with minor changes in 2010 and is still used in present endings. A different variation was introduced in 1995 and was used until 2008 before a revamped version was used from 2009.

Simon May's 1984 memo to the producers giving a breakdown of the various versions of the theme he had prepared refers to this as the "romantic pre-empt". The full version of the theme was featured on the B side of the original 1985 BBC theme tune 45 and also included on the compilation album Simon's Way the following year.

=== Episodes where Julia's theme has been used ===
No	Date	Circumstances
1	11 April 1985	Ian Beale (Adam Woodyatt) cries into the arms of his grandmother Lou (Anna Wing) after a heart-to-heart, because his father Pete (Peter Dean) disapproves of him becoming a chef.
2	20 June 1985	Sue Osman (Sandy Ratcliff) tells her husband Ali (Nejdet Salih) that she has a lump in her throat and cannot cry for her recently deceased baby, Hassan (Michael Evangelou).
3	1 August 1985	In order to make a despondent Sue Osman (Sandy Ratcliff) acknowledge her grief, Dr. Harold Legg (Leonard Fenton) forces her to hold baby Annie Smith (Zara Posener & Jenna Alembick). As she comforts the crying baby, she breaks down in tears.
4	3 October 1985	Following Michelle Fowler's (Susan Tully) meeting with Den Watts (Leslie Grantham) at the canal to tell him that she is pregnant with his baby, the two go their separate ways after agreeing to keep the child's paternity a secret.
5	2 January 1986	Pauline Fowler (Wendy Richard) has a heart-to-heart with her son Mark (David Scarboro) on Southend beach.
6	6 February 1986	Lofty Holloway (Tom Watt) asks a pregnant Michelle Fowler (Susan Tully) to marry him.
7	8 April 1986	Michelle Fowler (Susan Tully) agrees to marry Lofty Holloway (Tom Watt).
8	17 April 1986	Whilst alone in the bar at The Queen Victoria, Lofty Holloway (Tom Watt) and Michelle Fowler (Susan Tully) share a kiss before she leaves.
9	22 July 1986	Sue Osman (Sandy Ratcliff) tells Michelle Fowler (Susan Tully) that she has had a false pregnancy.
10	23 September 1986	On the night before Michelle Fowler's (Susan Tully) wedding to Lofty Holloway (Tom Watt), the father of her child, Den Watts (Leslie Grantham) wishes her good luck, while a drunken Lofty sleeps on the couch in The Queen Victoria.
11	4 June 1987	Arthur Fowler (Bill Treacher) returns home from prison and thanks his family for their support.
12	2 July 1987	Dot Cotton (June Brown) and Ethel Skinner (Gretchen Franklin) reminisce about life in the war in the first of a two-hander episode.
13	20 August 1987	Magda Czajkowski (Kathryn Apanowicz) asks Simon Wicks (Nick Berry) to move in with her.
14	20 August 1992	Arthur Fowler (Bill Treacher) reluctantly turns down Christine Hewitt's (Elizabeth Power) advances, but he kisses her passionately before he leaves.
15	25 December 1992	Mark Fowler (Todd Carty) rescues Mandy Salter (Nicola Stapleton) from her mother's abusive boyfriend Gary (Thomas Craig) and takes her back to Walford, where they celebrate Christmas at the Fowlers' house.
16	18 February 1993	Pauline Fowler (Wendy Richard) and Pat Butcher (Pam St Clement) have a heart-to-heart after Pat accidentally runs over and kills a young girl.
17	22 June 1995	Nigel Bates (Paul Bradley) tells his stepdaughter Clare (Gemma Bissix) that her mother Debbie Bates (Nicola Duffett) has died in a hit-and-run accident.
18	20 June 1996	Following Arthur Fowler's (Bill Treacher) funeral, his widow Pauline (Wendy Richard) walks away from his grave.
19	17 October 1996	Cindy Beale (Michelle Collins) leaves with her sons Steven (Stuart Stevens) and Peter (Francis Brittin-Snell) to live in Italy.
20	4 February 1999	Grant (Ross Kemp), Peggy (Barbara Windsor) and Courtney Mitchell (Carissa & Josephine O'Meara) scatter Tiffany Mitchell's (Martine McCutcheon) ashes at Peacehaven.
21	10 September 1999	Bianca Jackson (Patsy Palmer) leaves Walford with her son Liam Butcher (Jack & Tom Godolphin) to live in Manchester.
22	20 February 2000	Frank (Mike Reid) and Peggy Butcher (Barbara Windsor) vow to stay in Walford and fight Dan Sullivan (Craig Fairbrass) for ownership of The Queen Victoria.
23	28 November 2000	Sonia Jackson (Natalie Cassidy) breaks down after giving Chloe up for adoption.
24	22 February 2001	Roy (Tony Caunter) and Pat Evans (Pam St Clement) get back together.
25	10 May 2001	Ian Beale (Adam Woodyatt) and Laura Dunn (Hannah Waterman) get married.
26	21 December 2001	Jim Branning (John Bardon) proposes to Dot Cotton (June Brown) on the London Eye.
27	1 February 2002	Peggy Mitchell (Barbara Windsor) says farewell to Frank Butcher (Mike Reid) in Spain.
28	6 May 2002	Sonia Jackson (Natalie Cassidy) and Jamie Mitchell (Jack Ryder) decide to end their relationship.
29	21 June 2002	Anthony Trueman (Nicholas Bailey) proposes to Zoe Slater (Michelle Ryan).
30	16 August 2002	Little Mo Mitchell (Kacey Ainsworth) returns from prison.
31	14 February 2003	Pauline Fowler (Wendy Richard) and her son Martin (James Alexandrou) walk home just after Mark Fowler (Todd Carty) leaves Walford to travel the world before he dies.
32	14 November 2003	Alfie Moon (Shane Richie) interrupts the wedding of Andy Hunter (Michael Higgs) and Kat Slater (Jessie Wallace) to declare his love for Kat. Alfie and Kat decide to get together, and Kat jilts Andy.
33	24 June 2005	Zoe Slater (Michelle Ryan) leaves Walford to live in Ibiza.
34	9 December 2005	Stacey Slater (Lacey Turner) returns to Walford after her mother Jean's (Gillian Wright) attempted suicide. She looks at a picture of her brother Sean (Robert Kazinsky) and breaks down.
35	16 December 2005	Nana Moon (Hilda Braid) dies with her grandson Alfie (Shane Richie) by her side.
36	9 June 2006	Grant (Ross Kemp) and Courtney Mitchell (Megan Jossa) leave Walford to live in Portugal.
37	2 February 2007	Martin (James Alexandrou) and Sonia Fowler (Natalie Cassidy) leave Walford with their daughter Rebecca (Jade Sherif) to live in Manchester.
38	1 April 2008	Frank Butcher's (Mike Reid) funeral.
39	27 August 2009	Garry Hobbs (Ricky Groves) and Dawn Swann (Kara Tointon) leave together on a boat.
40	5 March 2010	Rachel (Pooky Quesnel) and Dot Branning (June Brown) lay flowers on Bradley Branning's (Charlie Clements) grave after his funeral.
41	26 April 2010	A secretly pregnant Amira Masood (Preeya Kalidas) leaves Walford by taxi after it is revealed her husband Syed (Marc Elliott) is gay.
42	23 June 2010	Stacey Branning (Lacey Turner) holds her baby daughter Lily after giving birth in hospital.
43	16 July 2010	Syed Masood (Marc Elliott) admits his true feelings to Christian Clarke (John Partridge) and they walk away together, finally united as a couple.
44	25 December 2010	Stacey Branning (Lacey Turner) flees the country with her baby daughter Lily. The credits roll over the ending shot of Stacey's view from the plane.
45	13 January 2011	After saying an emotional goodbye to his family, Charlie Slater (Derek Martin) leaves Walford by train.
46	11 March 2011	Phil Mitchell (Steve McFadden) and Shirley Carter (Linda Henry) leave for their honeymoon after deciding not to marry each other, but to stay together.
47	18 April 2011	Kat (Jessie Wallace) and Alfie Moon (Shane Richie) are reunited with their son Tommy, concluding the baby-swap storyline.
48	19 May 2011	Jane Beale (Laurie Brett) leaves Walford after an emotional farewell to her adopted son Bobby (Alex Francis).
49	26 May 2011	Jim Branning (John Bardon) leaves in an ambulance to go to a care home as his wife, Dot (June Brown), and his family look on.
50	17 January 2012	Ricky Butcher (Sid Owen) bids an emotional goodbye to his family before leaving Walford by train. His wife Bianca Butcher (Patsy Palmer), and the rest of the Jackson family walk home devastated.
51	8 February 2013	Zainab Khan (Nina Wadia) leaves in a taxi with her son Kamil (Arian Chikhlia), to live with her mother in Pakistan, after her relationship with ex-husband Masood Ahmed (Nitin Ganatra) falls apart.
52	17 September 2013	Jean Slater (Gillian Wright) leaves Albert Square with new romance Ollie Walters (Tony O'Callaghan) to live in Brighton.
53	30 May 2014	David Wicks (Michael French) finally leaves Walford after his relationship with Carol Jackson (Lindsey Coulson) comes to an end, ending their love story.
54	24 February 2015	Peter Beale (Ben Hardy) and a pregnant Lauren Branning (Jacqueline Jossa) walk away from Walford together as a couple to move to New Zealand.
55	22 May 2015	Kat (Jessie Wallace) and Alfie Moon (Shane Richie) leave Walford with their three children, starting a new life in Spain.
56	2 October 2015	Carol Jackson (Lindsey Coulson) leaves Walford on a motorbike for a fresh start.
57	7 January 2016	Kat Moon (Jessie Wallace) says goodnight to her father Charlie Slater (Derek Martin), following his death from a heart attack.
58	5 February 2016	Shabnam Masood (Rakhee Thakrar) leaves with her daughter, Jade Green (Amaya Edward), after ending her marriage to Kush Kazemi (Davood Ghadami).
59	7 October 2016	Pam (Lin Blakley) and Les Coker (Roger Sloman) walk home after finally getting justice for their grandson, Paul (Jonny Labey), after he was murdered in a homophobic attack.
60	17 November 2016	Masood Ahmed (Nitin Ganatra) and his son Kamil (Arian Chikhlia) leave Walford to return to Pakistan.
61	16 February 2018	After Abi Branning's (Lorna Fitzgerald) funeral, Donna Yates (Lisa Hammond), Robbie Jackson (Dean Gaffney), Jay Brown (Jamie Borthwick) and others release white balloons in her honour, Abi's baby girl is officially named Abi Branning after her mother, and Lauren Branning (Jacqueline Jossa) walks off with her son Louie Beale (Oscar Winehouse) to start a new life without Josh Hemmings (Eddie Eyre). The credits roll over the ending shot of Lauren and Louie walking away, and the background noise of birdsong continues to be heard over the theme.
62	15 February 2019	Dr. Harold Legg (Leonard Fenton) dies with Dot Branning (June Brown) at his bedside.
63	19 February 2019	Following Dr. Harold Legg's (Leonard Fenton) funeral, the residents of Albert Square light a candle in his memory.
64	19 February 2021	Max Branning (Jake Wood) leaves his granddaughter Abi Branning in the care of her great-aunt, Rainie Highway (Tanya Franks), finally giving the chance for Rainie and her husband Stuart (Ricky Champ) to bring up a child. He then grabs his luggage and walks away from Albert Square and Walford.
65	21 May 2021	Mick Carter (Danny Dyer) and his family walk away from the court following Katy Lewis' (Simone Lahbib) sentencing.
66	14 December 2021	Following the end of her marriage to Keegan Butcher-Baker (Zack Morris), Tiffany Butcher-Baker (Maisie Smith) tearfully leaves Walford with her brother Liam Butcher (Alfie Deegan) to live in Germany.
67	17 March 2022	Keegan (Zack Morris) and Tiffany Butcher-Baker (Maisie Smith) leave Walford together for Germany after reuniting.
68	31 May 2023	Lola Pearce-Brown (Danielle Harold) dies from a glioblastoma brain tumour with her husband Jay Brown (Jamie Borthwick) and daughter Lexi Pearce (Isabella Brown) at her bedside. The dawn light comes through the window and the credits roll over a shot of a red fox and Albert Square before fading to black.
69	8 December 2023	Karen Taylor (Lorraine Stanley) and Mitch Baker (Roger Griffiths) flee Walford with Phil Mitchell's (Steve McFadden) money to start a new life in Spain after Karen admits to kidnapping Sharon Watts' (Letitia Dean) son, Albie (Arthur Gentleman).
70	23 May 2024	Whitney Dean (Shona McGarty) leaves Walford with her foster daughter Britney Wainwright (Lola Campbell) and newborn daughter Dolly Dean-Hudson on a red bus, leaving Zack Hudson (James Farrar) and Bianca Jackson (Patsy Palmer) behind after Zack cheated on her with her best friend, Lauren Branning (Jacqueline Jossa).
71	2 January 2025	Suki Panesar-Unwin (Balvinder Sopal) wakes up in hospital next to her new wife Eve (Heather Peace) after Suki's ex-husband Nish Panesar (Navin Chowdhry) tried to kill them both. As the police cover Nish's deceased body, Eve tells Suki that they are free of him and Suki tells her that they have won.
72	20 February 2025	In a live episode, Martin Fowler (James Bye) dies of crush syndrome, with Stacey Slater (Lacey Turner) at his side after an explosion in the Queen Vic leaves him trapped and eventually crushed by a steel beam. The credits roll over the final shot of Stacey holding Martin's lifeless body as it fades to black after the credits conclude.
73	20 March 2025	Phil Mitchell (Steve McFadden) walks home from his father Eric Mitchell's (George Russo) grave with Billy Mitchell (Perry Fenwick), Nigel Bates (Paul Bradley), Linda Carter (Kellie Bright) and Lexi Pearce (Isabella Brown) after discharging himself from a mental health unit.
74	7 April 2025	Following Martin Fowler's (James Bye) funeral, he is laid to rest, alongside the graves of his mother, Pauline Fowler (Wendy Richard), father Arthur Fowler (Bill Treacher) and brother Mark (Todd Carty). The credits roll over the final shot of the cemetery.
75	17 April 2025	Realising she needs to get away from Walford, Sonia Fowler (Natalie Cassidy) leaves for Bali with her sister Bianca Jackson (Patsy Palmer) and her daughters Bex Fowler (Jasmine Armfield) and Julia Fowler as many Albert Square residents bid them farewell and watch them drive away.
76	29 April 2026	Succumbing to his dementia, Nigel Bates (Paul Bradley) dies from pneumonia in his care home bed, with a devastated Phil Mitchell (Steve McFadden) and Julie Bates (Karen Henthorn) by his side.
77	20 May 2026	Phil (Steve McFadden), Grant (Ross Kemp) and Sam Mitchell (Kim Medcalf) toast Nigel Bates (Paul Bradley) in the Arches after his funeral.
78	14 September 2026	Zoe Slater's (Michelle Ryan) body is carried out of The Queen Victoria after she dies in bed following a head injury, before her distraught mother Kat Moon (Jessie Wallace) chases after the hearse and collapses to the ground in front of the onlooking Walford residents.

Additionally a slightly distorted version of the theme plays in "The Ghosts of Ian Beale", a Children in Need 2014 special (14 November 2014), when Lucy Beale (Hetti Bywater) leaves and walks into the white light during her father Ian Beale's (Adam Woodyatt) concussion-induced dream. It does not lead onto the end of the episode.

== Alternative endings ==
Occasionally, singular episodes of EastEnders have used a different theme tune for the closing credits, or the initial drum beats are missing or have been replaced by something else, or even lacked music entirely.

Date	Circumstances
19 February 1985	The drum beats are at the beginning of the credits rather than the end of the episode and you can hear broken glass falling over the credits as a window was smashed in by Nick Cotton (John Altman) at The Queen Victoria public house.
12 September 1985	Michelle Fowler (Susan Tully) cries into the arms of her grandmother Lou Beale (Anna Wing) after Lou realises that Michelle is pregnant and they have a talk. There are no drum beats.
16 September 1986	Arthur Fowler (Bill Treacher) misses a family visit to his late father-in-law Albert Beale's (Gary Olsen) grave to attend a job interview and is unsuccessful and arrives at The Queen Vic hours later to explain to the family where he went. After being berated by Albert's widow, Lou for being unable to afford Michelle's wedding, Arthur leaves the pub, dejected. There are no drum beats.
25 November 1986	Lofty Holloway (Tom Watt) announces he and Michelle Fowler (Susan Tully) are married. There are no drum beats.
23 December 1986	On Christmas Eve, Den Watts (Leslie Grantham) discusses his plan with Jan Hammond (Jane How) to serve his wife Angie Watts (Anita Dobson) with divorce papers on Christmas Day, stating it will be a Christmas Angie will not forget. There are no drum beats.
1 September 1987	Pauline Fowler (Wendy Richard) and Kathy Beale (Gillian Taylforth) have a conversation in The Queen Vic about Pauline wanting things for herself and Pauline tells Kathy she dreams of a white room just for her away from the family. There are no drum beats.
22 December 1987	The Fowler family prepare for Christmas and Ethel Skinner (Gretchen Franklin), their guest, is excited. The first five drum beats are missing.
21 January 1988	When Lofty Holloway (Tom Watt) finds out that Michelle Fowler (Susan Tully) has aborted his baby, he confronts her in her living room and slaps her. There are no drum beats.
22 March 1988	When Dot Cotton (June Brown) walks into a strip show at the community center she faints. There are no drum beats.
19 July 1988	After being sexually assaulted, Kathy Beale (Gillian Taylforth) does not want to be touched and hides her bruises from her husband, Pete Beale (Peter Dean). There are no drum beats.
7 February 1989	Rod Norman (Christopher McHallem) makes a phonecall to Donna Ludlow's (Matilda Ziegler) mother, telling her that Donna needs her help. The drum beats begin at the start of the closing credits instead of the final shot of the episode.
23 February 1989	When Den Watts (Leslie Grantham) was shot and supposedly killed, the screen went black and cut into the closing credits. There are no drum beats.
9 May 1989	Matthew Jackson (Steven Hartley) attacks his wife Carmel Jackson (Judith Jacob). There are no drum beats.
22 June 1989	At the end of Pat (Pam St Clement) and Frank Butcher's (Mike Reid) wedding episode the drum beats were replaced by a conga tune.
5 July 1990	When Pete Beale's (Peter Dean) stall is demolished by a JCB, the drum beats are replaced by the sound of the JCB demolishing the stall.
2 September 1993	Sharon Watts (Letitia Dean), Grant Mitchell (Ross Kemp), Phil Mitchell (Steve McFadden), Kathy Beale (Gillian Taylforth), Frank Butcher (Mike Reid) and Pat Butcher (Pam St Clement) start their journey home from France after visiting Frank's pregnant daughter Diane Butcher (Sophie Lawrence). Sharon watches on as Phil and Kathy embrace. A segment from the full 1993 theme was used to act as Julia's theme.
5 October 1993	Debbie Bates (Nicola Duffett) accepts Nigel Bates' (Paul Bradley) offer and decides to spend the night with him. A segment from the full 1993 theme was used to act as Julia's theme.
21 October 1993	Ian Beale (Adam Woodyatt) begs his wife Cindy Beale (Michelle Collins) to return home after lies have spread and he mistakenly thinks she has cheated. A segment from the full 1993 theme was used to act as Julia's theme.
8 May 1995	The locals celebrate VE Day. The theme tune was replaced by "It's a Lovely Day Tomorrow" by Jack Payne.
10 April 1998	For Kathy Mitchell's (Gillian Taylforth) last regular episode, "Kathy's Theme" was played up to the credits, as she leaves Albert Square behind for a new life in South Africa.
30 April 1998	The final four seconds of "Kathy's Theme" was played up to the credits, as Nigel Bates (Paul Bradley), his stepdaughter Clare (Gemma Bissix), Julie Haye (Karen Henthorn) and Josh Saunders (Jon Lee) leave Walford to live in Scotland.
31 December 1999	When Mel Beale (Tamzin Outhwaite) leaves her husband, Ian (Adam Woodyatt), at the stroke of midnight on Millennium Eve, the regular closing drum beats are replaced by the tune of Auld Lang Syne. Cheering to celebrate the Millennium can be heard after the drum beats.
7 September 2000	The song "Guilty" was used over the end credits instead of the programme's usual title music to signify the final appearance of character Ethel Skinner (Gretchen Franklin) who had persuaded her friend Dot Cotton (June Brown) to help her die.
23 November 2000	When Ian Beale (Adam Woodyatt) was declared bankrupt, a sinister piano theme preceded the drums as Ian was driven round the Square, looking at his former business empire.
17 May 2001	At the end of a trip to Brighton for the Slater family, the song "Sisters Are Doin' It for Themselves" is played on the car stereo. The music continues into the credits superimposed over a wide shot of King's Road, Brighton as Garry Hobbs (Ricky Groves) drives the car into the distance.
21 January 2003	Alfie Moon (Shane Richie) turns off the lights to The Queen Victoria as an unknown song plays over the scene.
25 December 2003	Following the wedding of Alfie Moon (Shane Richie) and Kat Slater (Jessie Wallace) on Christmas Day, the residents of Albert Square celebrate by dancing to Wizzard's "I Wish It Could Be Christmas Everyday". The drum beats were replaced by this song.
11 November 2005	As Alfie Moon (Shane Richie) and Nana Moon (Hilda Braid) walk away from the graveyard in Normandy where William Moon (Dickon Tolson) is buried, "The Very Thought of You" plays over the end credits.
31 January 2008	This single-hander episode, "Pretty Baby....", featuring Dot Branning (June Brown) used the song "Pretty Baby" over the closing credits.
18 February 2010	In the lead-up to the show's 25th anniversary, the BBC asked viewers to upload videos of themselves singing the theme tune to the EastEnders website. This episode ended with a montage of these performances.
10 September 2010	For Peggy Mitchell's (Barbara Windsor) final regular episode, "Peggy's Theme" was played up to and over the ending credits as Peggy walks out of the Square, stopping to take one last look at The Queen Victoria. The credits roll over the continuing final shot of Peggy walking up the street and out of sight.
7 July 2011	A shortened version of Peggy's Theme is used as Ronnie Branning (Samantha Womack) found peace after being sentenced to three years imprisonment for the kidnap of Tommy Moon.
1 January 2012	"Pat's Theme" was used after Pat Evans (Pam St Clement) died. The picture faded to black for the credits and the theme was played. There are no drum beats.
13 January 2012	After the main credits, an extra scene aired featuring Simon Wicks (Nick Berry) laying flowers on his mother Pat Evans' (Pam St Clement) grave, followed by another set of drum beats.
20 September 2013	When Peggy Mitchell (Barbara Windsor) returns, an additional scene follows the end credits with Peggy paying homage to Pat Evans (Pam St Clement). The scene finished with a modified "Peggy's Theme".
20 February 2015	Part of "Peggy's Theme" is played toward the end of the live episode as the Beales huddle together after learning the truth behind Lucy Beale's (Hetti Bywater) death, and proceeds to play over a montage of the photos on the Beale's sideboard and various locations around the square. The theme simply faded out once the guests of Ian (Adam Woodyatt) and Jane Beale's (Laurie Brett) wedding reception began to gather outside The Queen Vic. Following on from this, part of "What I Did for Love" by David Guetta featuring Emeli Sandé plays as the residents celebrate with a fireworks display following the wedding of Ian and Jane. Once the music stops, the usual drum beats are replaced by the sound of fireworks manipulated into the familiar rhythm.
10 April 2015	Part of "Fly Me to the Moon" plays up to and over the credits following the death of Stan Carter (Timothy West) and the news of Jim Branning's (John Bardon) death. No theme tune was played.
1 January 2016	"Being Alive" (performed by Alice Fearn, who played a wedding singer in the episode) was played up to and over the credits following the wedding of Mick (Danny Dyer) and Linda Carter (Kellie Bright). The credits began rolling over the ending shot of Mick and Linda at the altar as it faded to black.
22 April 2016	A shortened version of "Peggy's Theme" is used as Mick Carter (Danny Dyer) and Masood Ahmed (Nitin Ganatra) walk away from the tube station as Nancy Carter (Maddy Hill) and Tamwar Masood (Himesh Patel) leave Walford.
17 May 2016	As Peggy Mitchell (Barbara Windsor) takes an overdose, the camera pans to a bird's-eye view of Albert Square and the credits roll. There are no drum beats or music. It then cuts to a view of a clock ticking indicating Peggy's death as the clock stops. The screen then fades to black.
19 May 2016	"Peggy's Theme" plays as Phil Mitchell (Steve McFadden) reads his mother Peggy's (Barbara Windsor) suicide note. The theme plays up to and over the credits.
4 July 2016	"Peggy's Theme" plays up to and over the credits as Phil Mitchell (Steve McFadden) says his final goodbye and walks away from his mother Peggy's (Barbara Windsor) grave following her funeral.
19 December 2016	A cover of "All I Want for Christmas Is You" by Lady A plays up to and over the credits as Mick (Danny Dyer) and Linda Carter (Kellie Bright) celebrate their son Ollie's (Charlie Harrington) first steps. The credits roll over a shot of Albert Square's gardens.
27 December 2016	"You Got the Love" by The Source featuring Candi Staton plays up to and over the credits as Ronnie Mitchell (Samantha Womack) asks Roxy Mitchell (Rita Simons) to move away with her. The credits roll over a shot of Roxy and Ronnie.
1 January 2017	After Ronnie Branning (Samantha Womack) and Roxy Mitchell (Rita Simons) drown in a swimming pool, the camera slowly pans out on their bodies floating in the water. The screen fades to black and the credits roll in silence over a black screen.
19 January 2018	After Abi Branning's (Lorna Fitzgerald) life support is withdrawn and she passes away, the screen fades to black and the credits roll in silence over a black screen.
5 July 2018	As Carmel Kazemi (Bonnie Langford) sits next to her son Shakil's (Shaheen Jafargholi) coffin in the funeral parlour, there are no drum beats leading to the main theme tune.
6 July 2018	At the end of this special episode, which saw the funeral of Shakil Kazemi (Shaheen Jafargholi) interspersed with clips of real-life families of knife legislation victims telling their stories, the screen fades to black and the credits roll over a black screen as voice clips of the featured families and news clips play over them. Instead of the usual cast and crew list, the credits list the names of the family members featured throughout the episode.
13 June 2019	As Linda Carter (Kellie Bright), Mick Carter (Danny Dyer), Shirley Carter (Linda Henry) and Tina Carter (Luisa Bradshaw-White) head off to the Spice World – 2019 Tour, "Who Do You Think You Are" by the Spice Girls accompanies the regular theme tune.
18 September 2020	After Chantelle Atkins (Jessica Plummer) is murdered by her abusive husband Gray Atkins (Toby-Alexander Smith), the screen fades to black on the final shot of her lifeless body on the floor. There are no drum beats, and the credits roll over a black screen, with only the distant sound of ambulance sirens being heard in place of the theme music.
4 April 2022	Following Tina Carter's (Luisa Bradshaw-White) funeral, a hurt Linda Carter (Kellie Bright) storms out of the church and swigs from a bottle of vodka. A distorted version of "Forever Young" by Alphaville plays up to and over the drumbeats. This episode was followed by a tribute to actress June Brown, who portrayed Dot Cotton, whose death was announced earlier that day.
2 June 2022	Following The Prince of Wales and The Duchess of Cornwall's royal visit to Albert Square in celebration of the Platinum Jubilee of Queen Elizabeth II, "God Save the Queen" plays and segues into a piano version of the theme as the credits roll.
1 December 2022	As Sonia Fowler (Natalie Cassidy) closes the door on Dot Branning's (June Brown) empty living room following the news of her death, the credits roll in silence over the scene as it slowly fades to black.
8 December 2022	After Dot Branning's (June Brown) body is returned to Walford ahead of her funeral, "From the Time You Say Goodbye (The Parting Song)" composed by Leslie Sturdy and sung by Dame Vera Lynn, plays up to and over the credits. The scene of the name on her coffin fades to black for the credits.
12 December 2022	"Dot's Theme" plays as Dot Branning's (June Brown) coffin is lowered into the ground, surrounded by her family, and continues over the end credits. The image cuts to Dot's empty house and the photographs left on her kitchen table, while archive recording of her voice is heard discussing mortality. Jack Branning (Scott Maslen) throws a packet of menthol cigarettes onto the coffin as a final tribute, before the camera pans away and the credits roll over the scene of the cemetery.
25 December 2022	An instrumental version of "To Build a Home" by The Cinematic Orchestra plays up to and over the credits after Mick Carter (Danny Dyer) is lost at sea trying to save Linda Carter (Kellie Bright). The credits roll over a shot of the coastline where he disappeared.
27 June 2023	Becky Hill's cover of "Forever Young" plays up to and over the credits as Jay Brown (Jamie Borthwick) sobs after watching Lola Pearce-Brown's (Danielle Harold) final video message to him following her funeral.
7 May 2024	"Can't Get By Without You" by The Real Thing plays up to and over the credits as Patrick (Rudolph Walker) and Yolande Trueman (Angela Wynter) embrace after Yolande opens up about her sexual assault at the hands of Pastor Gideon Clayton (Howard Saddler) during a two-hander episode. The credits roll over a photograph of the couple on holiday in Trinidad.
8 May 2025	"We'll Meet Again" by Vera Lynn plays up to and over the credits. Many residents of Albert Square dance together on the 80th anniversary of VE Day in the Queen Victoria Pub after toasting to local people lost during the Second World War and also Martin Fowler (James Bye) who died in the pub in February. As the residents dance, we see a photo of Martin laid on the War Memorial on Turpin Road, followed by a shot of names on the plaque of the memorial. The credits roll over footage of VE Day celebrations.
21 May 2025	A variation of the theme tune, in the style of a lullaby, plays over the credits as Lauren Branning (Jacqueline Jossa) cradles her newborn son Jimmy Beale in her arms after finding out that he is severely sight-impaired. The credits roll over a black screen.
23 December 2025	As Nigel Bates (Paul Bradley) agrees with Phil Mitchell (Steve McFadden) that the latter cannot look after him anymore as his dementia worsens, "Lonely This Christmas" by Mud plays up to and over the credits, which roll over the scene of the two sitting in the Square gardens.
30 April 2026	In the aftermath of Nigel Bates's (Paul Bradley) death, his friends and family celebrate his life and dance to "In the City" by The Jam. Phil Mitchell (Steve McFadden) thanks Nigel for being a friend to him, as the credits roll over a photo of them together.

=== Kathy's Theme ===
Used on Friday 10 April 1998 as Kathy Mitchell (Gillian Taylforth) leaves Albert Square behind for a new life in South Africa. As she departed London City Airport with Phil looking on, the theme started and Kathy took one final look at the place she called home, the East End of London. A snippet of "Kathy's Theme" was played one more time after this on 30 April 1998, during the episode where Nigel Bates (Paul Bradley), his stepdaughter Clare (Gemma Bissix), Julie Haye (Karen Henthorn) and Josh Saunders (Jon Lee) leave Walford to live in Scotland.

=== Peggy's Theme ===
"Peggy's Theme" is a variation of Julia's Theme, written by Simon May. It was featured in Barbara Windsor's farewell episode as Peggy Mitchell, transmitted on 10 September 2010, where it replaced the entire theme tune, unlike Julia's Theme which only replaces the drum beats. The introduction of the theme has since been used on a number of occasions in place of the usual Julia's Theme, only replacing the drum beats. The full "Peggy's Theme" was used again at the end of the episode dated 19 May 2016 as her son Phil Mitchell (Steve McFadden) reads the letter from Peggy following her death, and again on 4 July 2016 as Phil says his final goodbye to Peggy following her funeral.

"Peggy's Theme" features on the album The Simon May Collection and was also released as an EP along with other EastEnders music including the song "Anyone Can Fall in Love".

=== Pat's Theme ===
On 31 December 2011, it was announced May had reworked the programme's theme tune for Pat Evans' (Pam St Clement) final EastEnders episode.

The new version, called "Pat's Theme", played out at the end of the character's last episode broadcast on 1 January 2012. An EastEnders spokesperson told Daniel Kilkelly of Digital Spy, "It's only right that as we say goodbye to the iconic Pat Butcher we pay tribute to such a character with a wonderfully touching special theme tune." The theme features a piano and no other instruments. It was also used as the opening theme to a documentary programme, EastEnders: Farewell Pat, that aired on BBC1 the following day.

=== Elizabeth's Theme ===
A new version of the theme tune was commissioned for the Platinum Jubilee of Elizabeth II and appearance of Charles, Prince of Wales and Camilla, Duchess of Cornwall, broadcast on 2 June 2022. The theme begins with "God Save the Queen".

=== Dot's Theme ===
An arrangement entitled "Dot's Theme" is played on 12 December 2022 for the funeral of Dot Branning (June Brown). It plays while Dot's coffin is lowered into the ground at the end of the episode, continuing under an archive recording of Dot's voice and over the credits. "Dot's Theme" begins with the "Eventide" melody, before segueing into the "Julia's Theme" melody and finally the EastEnders main theme. The arrangement is led by piano and string instrumentation.

== Legacy ==
A 2000 UK poll named the theme as the sixth most popular TV theme of all time.

In a 2008 poll by PRS for Music the EastEnders theme was found to be the most recognisable piece of music in the UK, beating the national anthem "God Save the Queen", as well as the theme tunes for Match of the Day and Coronation Street. Composer Simon May commented: "When EastEnders first appeared in 1985 it was such a great buzz walking down the street or being in a supermarket hearing people whistling or humming the theme. I've been amazingly lucky that thanks to the huge success of the show the theme is still popular and in the national psyche."

The theme tune was also used in the 2012 Summer Olympics opening ceremony.

== Bibliography ==
- May, Simon (2015). Doof Doof: My Life in Music. Austin Macauley Publishers. ISBN 978-1785546372.
