= Leslie Osborne (composer) =

English television and music executive and composer (1905–1990)

- Born: 1905
- Died: 1990 (aged 84–85)
- Occupations: Executive, composer

Leslie Osborne (1905–1990) was an English television and music executive and composer of light music and themes for television and radio. As a composer, he wrote a number of lighter orchestral pieces such as Lullaby for Penelope.

In 1976, Osborne worked for ATV Music and was responsible for trying to get the company's catalogue airtime on BBC radio programmes. In that role, he met composer Simon May, who had then recently had a pop hit with his song "Summer of My Life". Osborne later introduced May to various other TV executives, and he was commissioned to write themes for Skorpion, Cold Warrior, EastEnders and Howards' Way.

Because of his executive role, Osborne was able to secure a writer credit for the themes for EastEnders and Howards' Way, despite, in reality, May being the sole composer. May says that Osborne "didn't write a single note... I could have possibly have insisted on retaining the copyright of EastEnders for myself, but if I had done so, I would have probably have lost the Howards' Way commission."

He also wrote the music for the hymn "Praise the Lord in the Rhythm of Your Music", featured in the popular children's hymnal Come and Praise.

== See also ==
- EastEnders theme tune
