= Peter Plummer =

English cricketer

Personal information
- Full name: Peter John Plummer
- Born: 28 January 1947 (age 79); Nottingham, Nottinghamshire, England
- Batting: Right-handed
- Bowling: Slow left-arm orthodox

Domestic team information
- Years: Team
- 1973–1977: Buckinghamshire
- 1969–1972: Nottinghamshire

Career statistics
Competition	First-class	List A
Matches	33	12
Runs scored	386	29
Batting average	12.86	9.66
100s/50s	–/–	–/–
Top score	46	11*
Balls bowled	3,641	384
Wickets	63	13
Bowling average	32.00	25.46
5 wickets in innings	2	1
10 wickets in match	–	–
Best bowling	7/71	5/44
Catches/stumpings	16/–	1/–
- Source: Cricinfo, 13 July 2011

Peter John Plummer (born 28 January 1947) is a former English cricketer. Plummer was a right-handed batsman who bowled slow left-arm orthodox. He was born in Nottingham, Nottinghamshire.

Plummer made his first-class debut for Nottinghamshire against Warwickshire. He made 32 further first-class appearances, the last of which came against Lancashire in the 1969 County Championship. In his 33 first-class matches, he scored 386 runs at an average of 12.68, with a high score of 46. With the ball, he took 63 wickets at a bowling average of 32.00, with best figures of 7/71. These figures, one of two five wicket hauls he took, came against Oxford University.

He also made his List A debut in 1969 against Yorkshire. He played less frequently in List A cricket for the county, making a further 11 List A matches, the last of which came in the 1972 John Player League against Somerset. In his 12 List A matches, he scored 29 runs at an average of 9.66, with a high score of 11 not out. With the ball, he took 13 wickets at an average of 25.46, with best figures of 5/44. These figures, which was his only five wicket haul in List A cricket, came against Yorkshire in his debut List A match.

He later joined Buckinghamshire, making his debut for the county against Oxfordshire in the 1973 Minor Counties Championship. He played Minor counties cricket infrequently for Buckinghamshire from 1973 to 1977, making 15 Minor Counties Championship appearances.

After his cricket career he embarked on a career as a teacher of physical education. In the early 1990s he became the headteacher of Ellis Guilford School and Sports College Ellis Guilford School in Basford, Nottingham. He later became executive head for a short period, retiring in 2012.
