= Trainer (TV series) =

- Genre: Drama
- Created by: Gerard Glaister
- Directed by: Jeremy Summers; Tristan de Vere Cole; Frank W. Smith; Terry Marcel; Peter Rose
- Starring: Mark Greenstreet; David McCallum; Susannah York
- Theme music composer: Simon May
- Ending theme: "More to Life" performed by Cliff Richard
- Country of origin: United Kingdom
- Original language: English
- No. of series: 2
- No. of episodes: 23

Production
- Producer: Gerard Glaister
- Cinematography: Graham Frake
- Running time: 51 minutes
- Production company: BBC

Original release
- Network: BBC1
- Release: 1 September 1991 – 2 December 1992

Trainer was a British drama television series transmitted by the BBC between 1 September 1991 and 2 December 1992. It was produced by Gerard Glaister as a follow-up to the long-running series Howards' Way.

Filmed in and around the village of Compton near Newbury, the series was set in the world of horse racing. It starred Mark Greenstreet as Mike Hardy, an aspiring horse trainer keen to set up his own stables. Other major characters included local gambler John Grey (David McCallum) and widow Rachel Ware (Susannah York).

The first series of 13 episodes was given the prime time Sunday night slot on BBC1 which had previously been occupied by another Glaister creation Howards' Way and a horse-racing storyline from that earlier programme provided much of the inspiration for Trainer. However, with ratings of around 6 million, the second series was reduced to ten episodes and shown on Wednesday evenings.

Many changes were made for the second series to try to increase its popularity. The self-contained story-per-episode format of the first series made way for a more soap-like continuous story, new characters were introduced and storylines focussed more on their intertwined personal lives. However, the mid-week slot and racier plots did not bring in the additional viewers needed to justify a third series. The last episode of the second series ended with a murder-mystery cliffhanger, which would never be resolved.

Trainer ran for two series and was the last television project for producer Gerard Glaister, who commissioned Simon May to compose the theme music, following their collaboration on Howards' Way. The opening titles of Trainer were accompanied by an instrumental theme. As had been the case with later series of Howards' Way, it was decided to add lyrics for the version for the closing titles. Mike Read was commissioned to write lyrics for May's composition, and the resulting song, "More to Life", was performed by Cliff Richard, entering the UK singles chart at No. 23.

== Cast ==
- Mark Greenstreet ... Mike Hardy (23 episodes, 1991–1992)
- Susannah York ... Rachel Ware (23 episodes, 1991–1992)
- David McCallum ... John Grey (23 episodes, 1991–1992)
- Floyd Bevan ... Nick Peters (23 episodes, 1991–1992)
- Neil Nisbet ... Danny Foster (21 episodes, 1991–1992)
- Audrey Jenkinson Mo Ratcliffe (19 episodes, 1991–1992)
- Des McAleer ... Joe Hogan (17 episodes, 1991–1992)
- Marcus D'Amico ... David Ware (15 episodes, 1991–1992)
- Nigel Davenport ... James Brant (13 episodes, 1991)
- Patrick Ryecart ... Hugo Latimer (13 episodes, 1991–1992)
- Nicola King ... Frances Ross (13 episodes, 1991)
- Sarah Atkinson ... Kath Brant (11 episodes, 1991)
- Claire Oberman ... Alex Farrell (10 episodes, 1992)
- Melanie Thaw ... Sue Lawrence (10 episodes, 1992)
- Kenneth Farrington ... Jack Ross (9 episodes, 1991)
- John Bowe ... Robert Firman (9 episodes, 1992)
- Emma Harbour ... Emma Carter (9 episodes, 1992)
- Angharad Rees ... Caroline Farrell (8 episodes, 1992)
- Joanna McCallum Toni Mountford (4 episodes, 1992)
- Jeremy Sinden ... Freddie Farrell (4 episodes, 1992)
- Stephen Greif ... Stavros Mikhalides (3 episodes, 1991–1992)

== Extra characters ==
- Michael Barnett ... unknown character (3 episodes, 1992)
- Robin Davies ... Neil Johnson (3 episodes, 1992)
- Dorcas Morgan ... Sally Hardy (3 episodes, 1992)
- Terence Harvey ... (2 episodes, 1991)
- Johnnie Lyne-Pirkis ... (2 episodes, 1991)
- Kym Mazelle ... (2 episodes, 1991)
- Don Warrington ... (2 episodes, 1992)
- Simon Jessop ... Rowland (unknown episodes, 1991)
- Robert Chapman ... Tom Hardy (unknown episodes, 1991–1992)
- David Spade ... Christian Hardy (unknown episodes, 1991–1992)
