= Simon May =

British composer (born 1944)

- Born: 15 August 1944 (age 82); Devizes, Wiltshire, England
- Education: Cambridge University
- Occupation: Composer
- Writing career
- Period: 1975–present
- Genres: Film, television
- Notable work: EastEnders
- Website: simonmay.co.uk

Simon May (born 15 August 1944) is a British composer. He has composed many British television theme tunes, including EastEnders and Howards' Way, and the music for the 1988 film The Dawning.

== Biography ==
Born in Devizes and a pupil of Dauntsey's School, May was a choral scholar at Corpus Christi College, Cambridge, where he graduated with a degree in modern languages in 1965. While teaching languages and music at Kingston Grammar School, he co-wrote a musical named Smike with a colleague, history teacher Clive Barnett, and songwriting partner Roger Holman. Following the publicity Smike attracted, May was contacted by the BBC, who televised the play in 1973, starring Beryl Reid and Andrew Keir. It also featured DJ Neil Fox, a pupil at Kingston Grammar, as one of the schoolboys. The show has subsequently been staged many times by youth drama groups.

While working at ATV, he was asked to compose some music for Crossroads. Stephanie de Sykes reached number 2 in the UK singles chart in 1974 with the subsequent "Born With a Smile on My Face", which was used within a storyline on the show. Kate Robbins performed another of May's songs for Crossroads: "More Than in Love," which was co-written by Barry Leng and reached number 2 in the UK in 1981.

He was one of the members of the vocal harmony group Rain, with de Sykes, Alex Keenan and Chas Mill. The group recorded the theme song "Golden Day", penned by Lynsey de Paul and Barry Blue, for the TV programme "The Golden Shot" to co-incide with the return of Bob Monkhouse as its host. They also released an album produced by Len Beadle, with the title "Rain Featuring Stephanie De-Sykes" in 1974.

May himself performed "The Summer of My Life", which reached number seven in the UK singles chart in October 1976. The song originally appeared in Crossroads, in a scene between Meg and Hugh. It was one of the best selling singles of the year, and was one of few songs to spend three weeks in a row at number seven in the UK Singles Chart. His follow-up single, "We'll Gather Lilacs - All My Loving (Medley)", flopped, reaching number 49 in May 1977. In 1986, he released an album called Simon's Way, which included his themes to EastEnders and Howards' Way, which peaked at number 59 in the UK Albums Chart. In the same year, his 'Holiday Suite' theme was used for the BBC Programme Holiday, and was released as a single.

He worked on his first feature film in 1988, The Dawning. Music from the film, with various other TV themes (including The Olympic Track and People like You), was released in 1989 on the Simon May Orchestra album Themes.

He co-produced Amii Stewart's "Knock on Wood", which reached number-one on the US Billboard Hot 100 chart in April 1979.

=== EastEnders ===
Tony Holland and Julia Smith commissioned May to write the theme to EastEnders after being impressed by his work on spy-thriller Cold Warrior. Don Black put lyrics to the popular theme, and Anita Dobson (who portrayed Angie Watts in the show) reached number 4 in the UK in August 1986 with "Anyone Can Fall in Love". With Barry Rose, the theme was adapted into a hymn, "Glory Be", which was performed on Songs of Praise and released as a single.

Another soap storyline gave May a hit in 1986. Nick Berry ("Wicksy") topped the charts with "Every Loser Wins", which he co-wrote after plugging it in EastEnders (a storyline which Holland openly hated).

In 1993 the theme itself was given an unpopular 'jazzy' update, and an updated version of the original was introduced in 1994. With Johnny Griggs, he wrote another set of lyrics for the EastEnders theme. "I'll Always Believe in You" featured lead vocals by Sharon Benson. which was based around the extended version of the 1993 theme. In 2009 he was asked to revamp the EastEnders theme again, to update the one running from 1994, making it lighter in tone and bringing back elements of the original theme missing in the previous version.

May wrote "Peggy's Theme" for Barbara Windsor's exit episode from EastEnders screened on 10 September 2010.

=== Post-EastEnders ===
Lyrics were also added to May's theme to Howards' Way; Marti Webb reached number 13 with "Always There" in 1986, a year after the orchestral version of the theme (credited to May and Leslie Osborne) had reached number 21 in the same UK Singles Chart. This was the version played over the opening credits of all six series, and the second half of the closing credits of series 1. The first part of the theme was a faster, upbeat rendition (later extended and slightly updated for the season 3 credits) which merged into the more familiar version used in the opening credits. The Marti Webb version of the theme was only played over the closing credits of series 2, with an updated extended version of the first half of the original series 1 orchestral version, playing over new style credits from series 3 onwards.

Mike Read wrote lyrics to May's Trainer theme. "More to Life" was performed by Cliff Richard. The theme won May his third TRIC award for Best TV Theme, after previous success with EastEnders and Howards' Way.

Following their collaboration on EastEnders, Julia Smith and Tony Holland commissioned May to write the theme tune for the new Eurosoap Eldorado. May reworked a song called "When You Go Away" which he had written for his ill-fated musical Mefisto, based on Goethe's Faust, adding Spanish guitars to make it more relevant to the Eldorado project. An instrumental version of the theme was used for the opening and closing credits. However, the vocal version of the song was recorded by Johnny Griggs, and was used over the closing credits of the final episode.

In 1994, New Vintage: The Best of Simon May, a compilation of some of May's work was released to coincide with his "A Night Away From The TV" UK tour. The tour was not a commercial success and some dates had to be cancelled. A Pebble Mill special documentary was produced by the BBC around this time discussing his career and the tour.

May recorded his album The Simon May Collection with his two co-writers/co-producers Simon Lockyer and John Brant. The album was released on 13 September 2010. "Peggy's Theme" was the lead track on the album.

In August 2015, May released his autobiography Doof Doof: My Life in Music through Austin Macauley Publishers. Two versions were released; one, a book-only version and also a CD-set, with a shorter printed autobiography.

May is visiting professor at the Faculty of Media, Arts and Society, Southampton Solent University who in 2015 conferred on him the degree of Honorary Doctor of Music. He is also Patron of the Devizes Junior Eisteddfod, Vice President of the British Federation of Festivals and Patron of the Swindon 105.5 Community Radio Station.

== May's work includes ==
=== Television ===
- Adventures of Enid Blyton
- The Adventures of Swiss Family Robinson
- Animal SOS
- Body Spies
- Brat Camp
- Castaway 2000 / Castaway 2007
- City Hospital
- Dealing with Dickinson
- Don't Try This at Home
- EastEnders
- Eldorado
- Evacuation
- Food & Drink
- Great Estates
- Hampton Court
- Health Farm
- Holiday '86
- Howards' Way
- Jobs for the Boys
- Jobs for the Girls
- Lakesiders
- The Legend of William Tell
- Lion Country (end theme of 'Animal Park')
- 1988 Olympics (ITV)
- Paramedics
- People
- Pet Rescue
- Relatively Speaking (1996 BBC game show)
- The Really Useful Show
- Russ Abbot Show
- Seaworld
- Secrets of Enid Blyton
- Skorpion
- Smike [also a stage musical]
- Swiss Family Robinson
- Testing Testing
- Trainer
- The Trial of James Earl Ray
- The Tribe
- Turnstile
- TV Weekly
- The Vet
- You Know What You Ate Last Summer

=== Films ===
- The Dawning (1988)
- HST West (1986) was done for Video 125. The theme 'The Holiday Suite' is the same as Holiday programme for the BBC. And the full version can heard on the DVD of HST West & Far West.
- HST Far West (1990)
- HST Great West (1993)
- The Fleet for The Northern Lights (1996)
- Caught in the Act (2008)
- House Husbands (2009)

=== Stage musicals ===
- Rip van Winkle
- Smike [also dramatised for BBC television]
