= Anita Dobson =

English actress and singer (born 1949)

Anita Dobson OBE
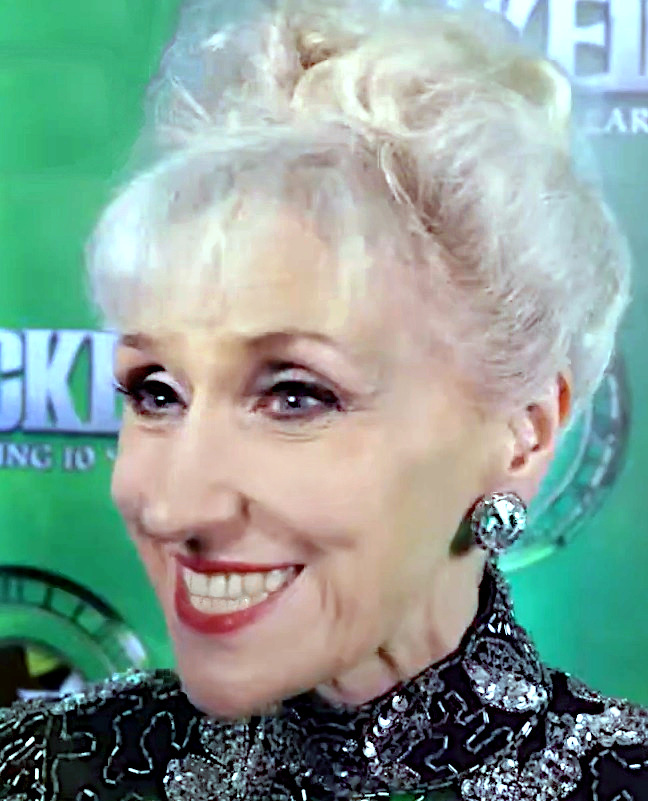
- Dobson in 2016
- Born: 29 April 1949 (age 77); Stepney, London, England
- Occupations: Actress; singer
- Years active: 1974–present
- Known for: Role of Angie Watts in EastEnders and the Rani in Doctor Who
- Spouse: Sir Brian May (m. 2000)

Anita Dobson, Lady May (born 29 April 1949) is an English actress and singer. She played landlady Angie Watts in the BBC soap opera EastEnders from the show's inception in 1985 until 1988. She achieved a top five hit in the UK singles chart in 1986 with "Anyone Can Fall in Love", a vocal version of the theme music of EastEnders, and briefly reprised her role for the show's 40th anniversary in 2025.

Dobson's other television roles include Cath in the 1989 ITV sitcom Split Ends and Mrs Flood, later revealed to be the Rani, in Doctor Who from 2023 to 2025. In 2003, she was nominated for the Olivier Award for Best Actress for the National Theatre production of Frozen. She has also starred in the West End as Mama Morton in the musical Chicago (2003) and Gertrude in Hamlet (2005), making her Royal Shakespeare Company debut in the 2012 revival of The Merry Wives of Windsor. Her film appearances include Darkness Falls (1999) and London Road (2015).

== Early life ==
Dobson was born 29 April 1949 in Stepney, London. She trained at the Webber Douglas Academy of Dramatic Art in London.

== Career ==
Dobson appeared in several series in the early 1980s including the Jim Davidson sitcom Up the Elephant and Round the Castle (1983). She played emotionally battered and alcoholic landlady Angie Watts in BBC1 soap opera EastEnders from the show's inception in 1985 until 1988. Dobson worked closely with actor Leslie Grantham, who played her adulterous husband 'Dirty Den Watts', landlord of the Queen Vic. On Christmas Day 1986, 30.15 million viewers tuned in to witness Den handing Angie divorce papers. After Dobson left EastEnders in 1988, BBC executives made numerous offers for her to return, but she did not accept any of them; she later commented: "Why tarnish the gorgeous creation that was Angie Watts?"

Dobson reprised her role for EastEnders's 40th anniversary, making a surprise one-off appearance as Sharon's hallucination in an episode broadcast on 19 February 2025.

=== Other roles ===
Dobson appeared in Red Dwarf (1993), and her own sitcom series Split Ends (1989). She has also made guest appearances in the BBC dramas Dangerfield (1995), Ghosts (1995), Sunburn (1999), and Hotel Babylon (2007), and the ITV detective series The Last Detective (2004) among others, along with the films Sweet Revenge (1998), and Darkness Falls (1999). She was also reunited with fellow EastEnders star Leslie Grantham in a Sky production called The Stretch, and Five's horror series Urban Gothic (2000).

Dobson guest starred in the ITV1 police drama The Bill in 2005, and appeared in the radio Doctor Who serial Blood of the Daleks. Dobson has also played five different guest characters in the BBC medical drama Casualty, appearing in episodes in October 2000, July 2009, July 2011, March 2013 and October 2017; she also had two guest roles in Casualty's sister series, Holby City, in September 2003 and December 2014 respectively. Dobson featured in the film London Road (2015), and appeared alongside Simon Callow in the Gold comedy series The Rebel (2016-2017).

On 20 January 2023, it was announced that Dobson would be guest starring in the fourteenth series of Doctor Who as the mysterious Mrs Flood. The episode was broadcast on Christmas Day 2023. On 27 April 2023, Dobson appeared in an episode of the BBC series Inside No. 9, "Mother's Ruin", as Frances. She returned as Mrs Flood in Doctor Who for multiple episodes in both the 2024 and 2025 seasons, and in the episode "The Interstellar Song Contest" it was revealed that Mrs Flood was an incarnation of Doctor Who villain the Rani.

=== Musical and stage career ===
Dobson has also performed as a singer, with varying degrees of chart success. In August 1986 she reached No. 4 in the UK singles chart with "Anyone Can Fall in Love", a song based on the theme music of EastEnders, which was written by Simon May. The song was produced by Queen guitarist Brian May, who later became her husband. She has also released several other singles and albums with minor chart success.

On stage, Dobson has starred in repertory at Salisbury Playhouse in Shaw's Pygmalion in 1980; the 1981 Ray Davies/Barrie Keeffe musical Chorus Girls at the Theatre Royal Stratford East; and as Hazel Fletcher in the short-lived musical Budgie with Adam Faith in the West End in 1988. She appeared in a revival of the Tom Stoppard play Rough Crossing and played a holocaust survivor in My Lovely Shayna Maidel. She also played Mama Morton in the West End musical Chicago.

Dobson played the role of Gertrude in the English Touring Theatre production of Hamlet, at the New Ambassadors Theatre in London's West End, following a UK tour in the autumn of 2005.

In 2012, Dobson played the role of Mistress Quickly in the Royal Shakespeare Company production of The Merry Wives of Windsor.

From September 2016 to January 2017, Dobson appeared as Madame Morrible in the musical Wicked at the Apollo Victoria Theatre in London.

In May and June 2018, Dobson starred in Katy Brand's new comedy-drama 3 Women at the Trafalgar Theatre, playing the role of Eleanor alongside Debbie Chazen and Maisie Richardson-Sellers.

In June 2019, Dobson joined Trevor Nunn's West End revival of Fiddler on the Roof at the Playhouse Theatre, playing the role of Yente, alongside Maria Friedman taking on the role of Golde, until the production's closure in November 2019.

=== Strictly Come Dancing ===
On 6 September 2011, it was announced that Dobson would take part in the 2011 series of Strictly Come Dancing. In the launch show of the ninth series on 10 September 2011, it was revealed that she would be partnered by Robin Windsor. She was eliminated on 27 November 2011 after Windsor had been unable to dance for a week due to an injury. Dobson therefore rehearsed and danced the Cha Cha Cha and the Swingathon with Brendan Cole.

| Week # | Dance/song | Judges' score | | | | | Result |
| Week # | Dance/song | Horwood | Goodman | Dixon | Tonioli | Total | Result |
|---|---|---|---|---|---|---|---|
| 1 | Waltz / Three Times a Lady—Commodores | 7 | 7 | 7 | 7 | 28 | N/A |
| 2 | Salsa / Jump in the Line (Shake, Senora)—Harry Belafonte | 7 | 7 | 7 | 7 | 28 | Safe |
| 3 | Jive / You Can't Stop the Beat—from Hairspray | 6 | 7 | 7 | 7 | 27 | Safe |
| 4 | American Smooth / I've Got You Under My Skin—Frank Sinatra | 8 | 8 | 8 | 8 | 32 | Safe |
| 5 | Tango / Devil Woman—Cliff Richard | 7 | 8 | 8 | 8 | 31 | Safe |
| 6 | Charleston / I Got Rhythm—George Gershwin | 7 | 8* | 8 | 8 | 31 | Safe |
| 7 | Argentine tango / Tango—from Cirque du Soleil | 7 | 9 | 8 | 9 | 33 | Bottom two |
| 8 | Samba / Come On Eileen—Dexys Midnight Runners | 6 | 7 | 7 | 7 | 27 | Safe |
| 9 | Cha Cha Cha / Uptown Girl—Billy Joel | 7 | 8 | 7 | 8 | 30 | Eliminated |
| 9 | Swing Marathon / Chattanooga Choo Choo | 2 out of 7 | | | | | Eliminated |

- In Week 6 Jennifer Grey guest judged for Goodman.

=== Awards ===
For her time on EastEnders as Angie Watts, Dobson received the Pye Award for Outstanding Female Personality.

In 2003, Dobson was nominated for the Laurence Olivier Award for Best Actress for her performance in Frozen at the Royal National Theatre.

In 2007, Dobson was made a Companion of the Liverpool Institute for Performing Arts.

Dobson was appointed Officer of the Order of the British Empire (OBE) in the 2025 Birthday Honours for services to charitable fundraising and to philanthropy.

== Personal life ==
Dobson married Brian May on 18 November 2000. They had first met in 1986 when May was married to his first wife. She is a patron of The Match Girls' Memorial of the theatre charity The Music Hall Guild of Great Britain and America, and the Focus Foundation.

== Filmography ==
=== Film ===
Key
| † | Denotes works that have not yet been released |

| Year | Title | Role | Notes |
|---|---|---|---|
| 1994 | Beyond Bedlam | Judith | |
| 1994 | Seaview Knights | The Blind Concierge | |
| 1998 | The Revengers’ Comedies | Daphne Teal | |
| 1998 | The Tichborne Claimant | Fanny Loder | |
| 1999 | Darkness Falls | Mrs. Hayter | |
| 2004 | Charlie | Mrs. Richardson Senior | |
| 2015 | Solitary | Nurse Mary | |
| 2015 | The Rise of the Krays | Madge | |
| 2015 | London Road | June | |
| 2016 | The Fall of the Krays | Madge | |
| 2018 | The Fight | Gene Dunn | |
| 2022 | Tomorrow Morning | Karen | |
| 2023 | Christmas at the Holly Day Inn | Molly Hennings | |
| 2024 | This Time Next Year | Ms. Mentis | |
| 2025 | 3 Wishes for Christmas | Caroline | |
| TBA | Jeb: The Fame and Fury † | The Narrator | Post-production |

=== Television ===
Key
| † | Denotes works that have not yet been released |

| Year | Title | Role | Notes |
|---|---|---|---|
| 1978 | Leave Him to Heaven | Roxanne | TV film |
| 1978-1981 | Play Away | co-presenter | 24 episodes |
| 1981 | Nanny | Dorothy | Episode: "Innocent Party" |
| 1983 | Partners in Crime | Esther Quant | Episode: "The House of Lurking Death" |
| 1983–1984 | Up the Elephant and Round the Castle | Lois Tight | 3 episodes |
| 1985–1988, 2025 | EastEnders | Angie Watts | Regular role; 275 episodes |
| 1989 | Split Ends | Cath | 6 episodes |
| 1990 | The World of Eddie Weary | Roxanne | TV film |
| 1993 | Red Dwarf | Captain Tau | Episode: "Psirens" |
| 1993 | Rab C. Nesbitt | Cath | Episode: "Rich" |
| 1993 | Woof! | Mrs. Fuller | 2 episodes |
| 1993 | Sean's Show | Betty | Episode: #2.6 |
| 1994 | Smokescreen | Gertie | 5 episodes |
| 1994 | The Fireboy | Mum | TV film |
| 1995 | Ghosts | Suzi Rudkin | Episode: "I'll Be Watching You" |
| 1995 | Go Back Out | Mum | TV film |
| 1995 | Dangerfield | Miriam Lampeter | Episode: "The Body in the Quarry" |
| 1996 | The Famous Five | Mrs. Stick | Episode: "Five Run Away Together" |
| 1997 | New Voices | Ellen | Episode: "Enough Excitement" |
| 1997 | Highlander | Molly Kingsley | Episode: "Diplomatic Immunity" |
| 1997 | Get Well Soon | Mrs. Ivy Osbourne | 4 episodes |
| 1997 | The Bill | Jane Elliot | Episode: "Has Anybody Here Seen Bigmouth?" |
| 1999 | Sunburn | Joyce Potts | Episode: #1.6 |
| 1999 | Junk | Mrs. Lawson | TV film |
| 2000 | Hearts and Bones | Donna Slaney | Episode: "Slipping Through My Fingers" |
| 2000 | Urban Gothic | Fenella | Episode: "Pineapple Chunks" |
| 2000 | Casualty | Elaine Carrington | Episode: "Choked: Part 2" |
| 2000 | The Stretch | Sam Greene | TV film |
| 2000 | Daddyfox | Joanne | TV film |
| 2002 | NCS: Manhunt | Jean Harris | 2 Episodes |
| 2002 | Fun at the Funeral Parlour | Fernando | Episode: "Dog Dago Afternoon" |
| 2002 | This is Your Life | Herself | Guest of Honour |
| 2003 | Doctors | Elizabeth Prior | Episode: "Truth Or Dare" |
| 2003 | Holby City | Lynn Spencer | Episode: "Love Nor Money" |
| 2004 | The Last Detective | Ruth Leyman | Episode: "Christine" |
| 2005 | New Tricks | Elaine Wanless | Episode: "A Delicate Touch" |
| 2005 | The Bill | Lynn Hunter | Episode: "Dangerous Relationships" |
| 2008 | Hotel Babylon | Lady Amelia Hamilton | Episode: #3.2 |
| 2009 | Casualty | Cora | Episode: "Ask Me No Questions" |
| 2009–2011 | Gigglebiz | Annette/ Voiceover | 2 Series |
| 2010 | Mission Green Santa | Mrs. Santa | All 10 episodes |
| 2010 | Little Crackers | Nan | Episode: "My First Nativity" |
| 2011 | Casualty | Rachel Lan | Episode: "Pascal's Wager" |
| 2011 | Coming Up | Maggie | Episode: "Hooked" |
| 2012 | Sadie J | Nan Bet | Episode: "Kissalicious" |
| 2013 | Casualty | Ruth Boswell | Episode: "And the Walls Come Tumbling Down" |
| 2013 | Moving On | Kate Marr | Episode: "The Value" |
| 2014 | Holby City | Betty Stern | Episode: "Star of Wonder" |
| 2015 | Pompidou | Sally | Episode: "The Date" |
| 2016–2017 | The Rebel | Margaret | All 9 episodes |
| 2016 | Doctors | Edwina Herriot | 2 episodes |
| 2017 | Casualty | Naomi Danes | Episode: "Mrs Beauchamp's Powder" |
| 2017 | Call the Midwife | Mabel Tillerson | Episode: "Christmas Special" |
| 2018 | Torvill & Dean | Miss Perry | TV film |
| 2018–2019 | The Worst Witch | Mirabelle Hubble | 3 episodes |
| 2021 | The Long Call | Grace Stephenson | All 4 episodes |
| 2022 | Andy and the Band | Auntie Shona | Episode: "Boo! Who?" |
| 2022 | Dodger | Bertha Plummer | Episode: "Christmas" |
| 2023 | Inside No. 9 | Frances | Episode: "Mother's Ruin" |
| 2023 | Murder, They Hope | Bella | Episode: "Blood Actually" |
| 2023–2025 | Doctor Who | Mrs. Flood/The Rani | 12 episodes |
| 2024 | Curfew | Janet | All 6 episodes |
| 2024 | Generation Z | Janine | All 6 episodes |
| 2025 | Father Brown | Eunice Lytton | Episode: "The Deserving Poor" |
| 2025 | Play for Today | Cynthia Jackson | Episode: "Never Too Late" |

== Theatre credits ==
| Year | Title | Role | Notes |
|---|---|---|---|
| 1974–1975 | Babes in the Wood | Mistress Truck | Watford Palace Theatre |
| 1975 | Ardèle | Ada | Various Locations |
| 1977–1978 | The Wizard of Oz | Wicked Witch of the West | Nottingham Playhouse |
| 1978 | Deeds | Various | Nottingham Playhouse |
| 1978 | The Alchemist | Dol Common | Nottingham Playhouse |
| 1980 | Pygmalion | Eliza Doolittle | Salisbury Playhouse |
| 1981 | Chorus Girls | Chorus Girl | Theatre Royal, Stratford |
| 1982–1983 | Dick Whittington | Alice Fitzwarren | Shaw Theatre, London |
| 1983 | Charley's Aunt | Kitty Verdun | Aldwych Theatre |
| 1983–1984 | Jack and the Beanstalk | Spirit of the Beans | Assembly Halls, Tunbridge Wells |
| 1984 | Rough Crossing | Natasha | Lyttelton Theatre |
| 1984–1985 | Henry IV, Part 1 | Mistress Quickly | Theatre Royal, Bath |
| 1986–1987 | Aladdin | The Princess | Bournemouth Pavilion |
| 1987–1988 | Aladdin | The Princess | Richmond Theatre |
| 1988 | Budgie | Hazel | Cambridge Theatre |
| 1989–1990 | Dick Whittington | Fairy Godmother | Orchard Theatre, Dartford |
| 1990–1991 | Aladdin | The Genie | Theatre Royal, Newcastle |
| 1991 | Kvetch | Donna | Garrick Theatre |
| 1991 | My Lovely...Shayna Maidel | Luissa | Ambassadors Theatre, London |
| 1991–1992 | Dick Whittington | Fairy Godmother | Hexagon Theatre, Reading |
| 1992 | Le Bourgeois gentilhomme | Madame Jourdain | National Theatre |
| 1992–1993 | Snow White and the Seven Dwarfs | Wicked Queen | Richmond Theatre |
| 1994–1995 | Snow White and the Seven Dwarfs | Wicked Queen | Yvonne Arnaud Theatre, Guildford |
| 1995–1996 | The Break of Day | April | Various Locations |
| 1997–1998 | Snow White and the Seven Dwarfs | Wicked Queen | Orchard Theatre, Dartford |
| 1998 | Frozen | Nancy | Birmingham Repertory Theatre |
| 1998–1999 | Dick Whittington | Evil Queen | Hackney Empire |
| 1999 | The Pajama Game | Mabel | Victoria Palace Theatre, London |
| 2000–2001 | The Wizard of Oz | Wicked Witch of the West | Richmond Theatre |
| 2001 | The Three Sisters | Olga | Royal Court Theatre |
| 2001–2002 | Snow White and the Seven Dwarfs | Wicked Queen | The Derngate Theatre, Northampton |
| 2002–2003 | Snow White and the Seven Dwarfs | Wicked Queen | Fairfield Halls, Croydon |
| 2003 | Chicago | Mama Morton | Adelphi Theatre |
| 2003–2004 | Snow White and the Seven Dwarfs | Wicked Queen | Assembly Halls, Tunbridge Wells |
| 2004–2005 | Snow White and the Seven Dwarfs | Wicked Queen | Wycombe Swan, High Wycombe |
| 2005 | Hamlet | Gertrude | UK tour |
| 2006 | Hamlet | Gertrude | Ambassadors Theatre, London |
| 2005–2006 | Santa Claus the Musical | Ice Queen | Mayflower Theatre Southamtpon |
| 2006–2007 | Snow White and the Seven Dwarfs | Wicked Queen | Ipswich Regent Theatre |
| 2007–2008 | Hello, Dolly! | Dolly Levi | UK tour |
| 2007–2008 | Santa Claus the Musical | Ice Queen | Alexandra Theatre, Birmingham |
| 2009–2010 | Aladdin | The Genie | New Wimbledon Theatre |
| 2010–2011 | Sleeping Beauty | Carabosse | Richmond Theatre |
| 2011–2012 | Aladdin | The Genie | Milton Keynes Theatre |
| 2012 | The Merry Wives of Windsor | Mistress Quickly | Royal Shakespeare Company |
| 2013–2014 | Aladdin | The Genie | Aylesbury Waterside Theatre |
| 2015–2016 | Sleeping Beauty | Carabosse | New Victoria Theatre, Woking |
| 2016–2017 | Wicked | Madame Morrible | Apollo Victoria Theatre |
| 2018 | 3 Women | Eleanor | Trafalgar Theatre |
| 2018–2019 | Cinderella | Wicked Stepmother | Hull New Theatre |
| 2019 | Annie | Miss Hannigan | UK tour |
| 2019–2020 | Cinderella | Wicked Stepmother | Royal & Derngate, Northampton |
| 2022 | Aladdin | Abanazar | Brighton Centre |
| 2024 | Proms 47 & 48: Doctor Who | Mrs. Flood | Royal Albert Hall |
