= List of The Troubleshooters (British TV series) episodes =

This is a list of episodes from the British television series, The Troubleshooters that ran for 7 series from 1965 to 1972. Of the 136 episodes produced, 88 are missing and 48 survive. Of the 17 surviving colour episodes, 16 exist in black and white. 2 missing episodes have surviving audio recordings and 1 missing episode has an existing unbroadcast version.

== Series overview ==
Series	Episodes	Originally released		Status
Series	Episodes	First released	Last released	Status
1	13	7 July 1965	29 September 1965	7 missing
2	26	30 April 1966	22 October 1966	10 missing
3	13	30 January 1967	1 May 1967	12 missing
4	26	13 October 1967	3 May 1968	20 missing
5	26	6 January 1969	14 July 1969	24 missing
6	17	18 May 1970	7 September 1970	15 missing
7	15	13 September 1971	3 January 1972	Complete

== Episodes ==
=== Series 1 (1965) ===
Broadcast on BBC1 on Wednesdays at 8.00 pm under the title Mogul.

No. overall	No. in season	Title	Directed by	Written by	Original release date	Archive status
1	1	"Kelly's Eye"	Michael Hayes	John Elliot	7 July 1965	Exists
Mogul's North Sea drilling rig, Kelly's Eye, strikes a small pocket of oil that proves worthless, but someone on board leaks the find to the press and television. Brian Stead, Mogul's director of operations, orders the culprit found and sacked, and the job of investigating, ashore and on the rig, falls to Peter Thornton, the manager of North Sea operations, who finds himself questioning his own friends. Guest stars: Frank Williams as Norman Reeves
2	2	"Young Turk"	William Slater	John Elliot	14 July 1965	Exists
A young executive thrown into the negotiations for oil concessions in the Middle East learns that they are won only with speed, cunning and, often, ruthlessness.
3	3	"Safety Man"	David Proudfoot	John Elliot	21 July 1965	Missing
Ron Smith, the new safety officer at Mogul's Portlea refinery, is pompous but highly experienced. The personnel manager, Derek Prentice, troubled by his behaviour, asks head office for a medical check-up, while Prentice's secretary, Gwyneth, befriends the lonely man. Head office, busy with plans for a royal visit to the refinery, pays the matter little attention until the visit is almost upon them. Guest stars: Judi Dench as Gwyneth Evans, Edward Woodward as Ron Smith
4	4	"Wildcat"	William Slater	John Elliot	28 July 1965	Exists (Note: A 16mm print was bought from a private collector in 1999 and returned to the BBC archive in 2023.)
Mogul accepts wildcat drilling as a calculated risk, but for an African executive who stakes his own judgement on a well, the dangers are greater still. Guest stars: James Beck as Alan Boyd
5	5	"Tosh and Nora"	Peter Cregeen	Mike Watts	4 August 1965	Exists
Tosh Brinkwater, at fifty-five the hardest-living seaman in the Mogul fleet, is about to become a father for the first time. He gives up gambling, drinking and his runs ashore at Port Said and asks Brian Stead for a job on land so that he can be with his wife, Nora, and the baby, but his plans do not work out as he hopes. Guest stars: John Noakes as Sammy
6	6	"The Schloss Belt"	John Frankau	John Elliot	11 August 1965	Missing
Mogul is divided over whether to enter the West German market, and Robert Driscoll is sent to Hamburg to assess it. There he meets some of the less attractive consequences of the country's post-war "economic miracle". Guest stars: Charles Gray as Michael Rennane, Nigel Stock as Herr Schilling, Kenneth Kendall as Newsreader
7	7	"Out of Range"	Max Varnel	John Elliot	18 August 1965	Exists
For a young geologist eager to prove himself, work in the desert is exhilarating, but the desert, like the sea, can be deadly.
8	8	"The Way It Crumbles"	Shaun Sutton	Kenneth Ware	25 August 1965	Missing
Robert Driscoll goes against Stead in trying to take Mogul into Grand Prix motor racing, and puts himself in danger. Guest stars: Keith Barron as Miles
9	9	"A Job for Willy"	Roger Jenkins	James Mitchell	1 September 1965	Missing
A few careless remarks reopen old grievances in the Tyneside shipyard building Mogul's new North Sea rig, and trouble breaks out.
10	10	"Meet Miss Mogul"	Michael Hayes	John Elliot	8 September 1965	Missing
For Sandra Spratt, chosen as Miss Mogul, the world of advertising is a dream come true. Others see it differently, and the result is a headache for Derek Prentice and the company. Guest stars: Suzy Kendall as Sandra, David Hemmings as Colin
11	11	"Stoneface"	Peter Cregeen	John Lucarotti	15 September 1965	Exists
Mogul appoints an Iroquois to an important post in northern Canada, and the deep-rooted prejudice it stirs up draws Robert Driscoll into an explosive situation.
12	12	"Driver of the Year"	Max Varnel	Mike Watts	22 September 1965	Missing
Peter Thornton envies the apparent freedom of a Mogul tanker driver, and discovers that nobody is as free as he looks. Guest stars: Bernard Cribbins as Chas Wilson
13	13	"Borrowed Time"	John Frankau	John Elliot	29 September 1965	Missing
Brian Stead, Mogul's head of operations and acting deputy managing director, is setting out on a business trip almost round the world when a doctor orders him to rest. News of his illness sets off a struggle for power at head office, led by the board member Martin Lister. Guest stars: Douglas Wilmer as Martin Lister

=== Series 2 (1966) ===
Broadcast on BBC1 on Saturday evenings, now under the title The Troubleshooters.

No. overall	No. in season	Title	Directed by	Written by	Original release date	Archive status
14	1	"Is That Tiger, Man"	Moira Armstrong	John Elliot	30 April 1966	Exists (Note: Believed lost until a print was recovered in 2023.)
Peter Thornton, in charge of Mogul's drilling in the Caribbean, strikes oil and expects a permanent manager to take over, leaving him free to go home and try to save his marriage, which is threatened by his bored wife's involvement with "Tiger", a professional diver.
15	2	"When You Gotta Go"	Terence Dudley	Kenneth Ware	7 May 1966	Missing
Mogul's attempt on the world water-speed record runs into trouble, and Alec Stewart has to work out whether the danger lies with the driver, the boat or sabotage. Guest stars: Michael Sheard as 2nd Mechanic
16	3	"Thea"	James Gatward	John Elliot	14 May 1966	Missing
A Mogul geologist is killed in an explosion, and when his fiancée arrives in Trinidad at carnival time she brings a crisis with her for Thornton. Guest stars: Rudolph Walker as Ken, Earl Cameron as Thomas, Joss Ackland as Mr. Gibbon
17	4	"If You Can't Lick 'Em"	John Frankau	David Weir	21 May 1966	Missing
Stewart and Jane Webb are sent to Romania with orders to buy a man for Mogul. Guest stars: Molly Weir as Mrs. McBride
18	5	"This Is Where I Came In"	Max Varnel	John Lucarotti	28 May 1966	Missing
Thornton tries to replace Mogul's manager in a newly independent Asian state and is caught up in a revolution just as his marriage falls apart. Guest stars: Burt Kwouk as Ban-Di
19	6	"Birdstrike"	John Frankau	John Lucarotti	4 June 1966	Exists (Note: Recovered from a private collector in 2010.)
The first aircraft to fly on Mogul's new fuel crashes, and the question is who was to blame. Guest stars: Adrienne Corri as Monserrat Vera
20	7	"The Fires of Hell"	Terence Dudley	Vincent Tilsley from a story by James Mitchell	11 June 1966	Missing
A peaceful voyage on a supertanker turns into a nightmare for Thornton and Jane Webb when threats are made to blow up the ship.
21	8	"Wingless Wonder"	Moira Armstrong	John Elliot	18 June 1966	Missing
Roy Binns accuses Mogul of swindling and blackmail, and Jane Webb finds herself falling for him.
22	9	"Cablegrams Come Expensive"	James Gatward	Anthony Read	25 June 1966	Missing
Peter Thornton goes back to Australia after his divorce, and his homecoming is clouded by emotional problems.
23	10	"Operation Saigon"	Terence Dudley	John Elliot	2 July 1966	Missing
A bomb goes off as Stewart arrives at Saigon airport, and he is soon drawn deep into the conflicts of a country at war. Guest stars: Tsai Chin as Kha Loi
24	11	"Baptism of Fire"	Max Varnel	Ian Kennedy Martin	9 July 1966	Exists
Fire breaks out on Mogul's new rig in the Persian Gulf, and Stewart and Thornton clash head-on over how to save it. Guest stars: Valentine Dyall as Chauffeur, Anna Karen as Paley's Girl Friend
25	12	"Join the Club"	Moira Armstrong	John Elliot	16 July 1966	Missing
Stead runs into trouble during a cross-country car rally, and Izard has to put his personal life before Mogul.
26	13	"Do Your Best for the Lads"	Roger Jenkins	James Mitchell	23 July 1966	Missing
Building a new supertanker for Mogul in a north-east shipyard becomes a seven-million-pound headache for Thornton. Guest stars: Nigel Stock as Arthur Rogers, Joss Ackland as Sam Jardine
27	14	"Someone's Head Has to Roll"	John Frankau	David Weir	30 July 1966	Exists
Izard, together with Stead and Stewart, faces a serious threat to his position in Mogul.
28	15	"Troubled Waters"	Max Varnel	John Lucarotti	6 August 1966	Exists
Thornton is in great danger when a hurricane hits Mogul's new drilling rig in the Caribbean. Guest stars: Arthur Mullard as Hasher Brown
29	16	"What's Yours Is Mine"	James Gatward	Ian Kennedy Martin	13 August 1966	Exists
Stead faces a crisis when an African state seizes a Mogul refinery. Guest stars: Edric Connor as Chief Cofe Okani
30	17	"The Bigger They Are"	Brian Parker	Bryan Cooper	20 August 1966	Exists
Stead sends Stewart to Italy to report on Mogul's agent there, Count Solferini. Guest stars: William Franklyn as Michael Rennane
31	18	"Some Wet Night in Sauchiehall Street"	Roger Jenkins	George Byatt	27 August 1966	Exists
Two Scottish engineers at a Mogul pumping station in North Africa, the volatile Glaswegian MacCallum and the steady Garvie from Edinburgh, have put forward rival schemes for re-equipping the station, and their quarrel reaches the point where Stead sends Thornton out to arbitrate.
32	19	"Error of Judgement"	James Gatward	Lee Dunne	3 September 1966	Exists
A pleasure drive becomes a nightmare for Alec Stewart when he drives through France in an international car rally.
33	20	"They're Probably Drilling for Oil"	Max Varnel	John Lucarotti	10 September 1966	Exists
Trapped in the Arctic wilderness of Spitsbergen, Peter Thornton knows that a single mistake could cost him his life.
34	21	"A Run for Their Money"	Brian Parker	Ray Jenkins	17 September 1966	Exists
Mogul's plan to build a £30 million refinery and tanker terminal on the west coast of Wales meets local opposition.
35	22	"Happy Landings"	Roger Jenkins	John Elliot	24 September 1966	Exists
Stewart runs into trouble when a hero from his past intrudes on the present. Guest stars: Gordon Jackson as Alan Prescott, Glynn Edwards as Ted Edwards
36	23	"There's Nothing Like the Great Outdoors"	James Gatward	John Lucarotti	1 October 1966	Exists
The chairman's annual report has no new drilling plans to announce. The only prospect is an area of northern Ontario where a survey team has searched without success for two years, and Thornton is sent to Canada to hurry them along, only to find himself in an explosive situation. Guest stars: David Griffin as Greg Harley
37	24	"Out of Your Evil Dream"	John Warrington	John Gould	8 October 1966	Exists
When a scientist rebels, Stewart has to judge whether Mogul's new chemical crop spray is a killer. Guest stars: Philip Madoc as Vanstirom
38	25	"Four Cheers for Geoffrey"	Brian Parker	James Mitchell	15 October 1966	Exists
Thornton has to find out whether Geoffrey Brady is a blackmailer, a fraud, an agitator or a brilliant young executive, one of his hardest assignments.
39	26	"No Such Thing as Luck"	Roger Jenkins	David Weir	22 October 1966	Exists
Mogul is the only major oil company yet to strike gas in the North Sea, and with bad weather keeping its rigs idle it is in danger of losing its concessions. Stead orders an all-out effort, with Stewart and Thornton in charge.

=== Series 3 (1967) ===
Broadcast on BBC1 on Monday evenings.

No. overall	No. in season	Title	Directed by	Written by	Original release date	Archive status
40	1	"Words Are Softer than Oil"	James Gatward	John Gould	30 January 1967	Missing
A power struggle for a vacant seat on the Mogul board is looming. Stead's son John joins the company from the Foreign Office and faces his first big test, while danger in the North Sea and on land in Europe threatens Thornton with disaster.
41	2	"A Damn Great Lump of Iron"	John Warrington	James Mitchell	6 February 1967	Missing
Mogul wants a sister ship for its newly launched supertanker, Mogul Emperor, at the same price, and Stewart has to get the shipbuilders to agree. A sequel to "Do Your Best for the Lads". Guest stars: Nigel Stock as Arthur Rogers, Joss Ackland as Sam Jardine, Felix Aylmer as Lord Ravenscar
42	3	"My Daughter Knows Her Way Around"	Laurence Bourne	David Weir	20 February 1967	Missing
Stewart goes to Egypt to explore business openings left untouched since Suez, finds himself talking politics with a rebel leader, Dr Qadir, and faces a delicate personal problem. Guest stars: Peter Bowles as Abbas Ramzi
43	4	"Home and Dry"	Roger Jenkins	John Lucarotti	27 February 1967	Missing
Thornton goes 300 feet beneath the sea for Mogul, where danger and fear are waiting. Guest stars: Colin Blakely as Commander Cardno, Annette Andre as Tammy Gervais, Windsor Davies as Chief Petty Officer
44	5	"We're None of Us Perfect"	David Proudfoot	Tom Clarke (as James Landry)	6 March 1967	Missing
Competition for the vacant board seat intensifies. Thornton is given the job of closing a depot but is replaced by Stewart, whose scheme seems likely to give him the edge, just as Roz's boutique runs into serious trouble and the Stewarts' marriage begins to crack.
45	6	"Think Big"	Roger Jenkins	John Elliot	13 March 1967	Missing
A dream of greatness brings a crisis for the troubleshooters when Stead decides to leave Mogul.
46	7	"Some Days You Just Can't Win"	James Gatward	John Lucarotti	20 March 1967	Exists
The Rhodesian oil embargo takes Stead and Thornton to Africa, where Stead's life is in Thornton's hands. Guest stars: John le Mesurier as Kemp, James Beck as Dave Sandy
47	8	"Nothing to Do with Mogul"	David Proudfoot	Eve Martell	27 March 1967	Missing
An Easter tragedy forces Alec Stewart to choose between his personal life and Mogul.
48	9	"No Sentiment in Business"	James Gatward	Roy Russell	3 April 1967	Missing
A death brings Mogul an opportunity and Thornton a test of loyalty. Guest stars: Wendy Craig as Maggie Telfall
49	10	"Journey from the Interior"	Roger Jenkins	Ian Kennedy Martin	10 April 1967	Missing
Thornton runs into trouble in Africa and faces a dangerous journey with unlikely companions. Guest stars: Fulton MacKay as Major Ruthven
50	11	"Long Knives Cut Deep"	David Proudfoot	Ray Jenkins	17 April 1967	Missing
One man stands in the way of Mogul's hopes for North Sea gas, and Stewart has to decide whether to buy him or break him. Guest stars: Wilfred Pickles as Will Faulkner
51	12	"Women and Business Never Did Mix"	Laurence Bourne	David Weir	24 April 1967	Missing
Izard opposes Stead and Stewart when they take over a German firm. Stead's plan is brilliant, but Izard finds powerful allies. Guest stars: Phyllida Law as Mary Fielding
52	13	"There's Always a Next Time"	Moira Armstrong	David Weir	1 May 1967	Missing
Stead and Stewart clash bitterly in a fight with no second place: the loser must leave Mogul. Guest stars: Saeed Jaffrey as Rt. Hon. Mohammad Khan

=== Series 4 (1967–68) ===
Broadcast on BBC1 on Friday evenings.

No. overall	No. in season	Title	Directed by	Written by	Original release date	Archive status
53	1	"Dragon by the Tail"	Moira Armstrong	Anthony Read	13 October 1967	Missing
Thornton is sent to Hong Kong to make contact with a leading oil scientist who is about to escape from China. He becomes involved in the personal tragedy of a young Chinese girl and is drawn into international intrigue. Guest stars: Tsai Chin as Esther Ho
54	2	"The Daring Young Man"	Roger Jenkins	John Elliot	20 October 1967	Missing
Stead orders Thornton to find a man and bring him back, but the man is crossing the Sahara and has no wish to return.
55	3	"Where the Carpet Ends"	Moira Armstrong	John Elliot	27 October 1967	Missing
Trying to help a girl he believes has been unfairly dismissed, Izard uncovers a drug-smuggling ring inside Mogul.
56	4	"Winner Lose All"	James Gatward	Ian Kennedy Martin	10 November 1967	Missing
Against the background of an international power-boat race in which Mogul has an interest, Thornton is faced with a choice.
57	5	"A Nice White Girl, Is She for Sale?"	Roger Jenkins	David Weir	17 November 1967	Missing
A desert sheikh tries to buy Eileen O'Rourke, but Szabo thinks that too high a price for an oil concession. Guest stars: Peter Wyngarde as Sheik Mohammed bin Falik
58	6	"Mr. Know-How"	Ian MacNaughton	Roy Russell	24 November 1967	Missing
Willy Izard tries to repay a debt to his former boss, and learns to his cost how loyalty can cloud judgement. Guest stars: Bernard Lee as Bernard Hart, Kate O'Mara as Kim Hart
59	7	"And the Walls Came Tumbling Down"	Roger Jenkins	John Lucarotti	1 December 1967	Missing
Thornton disappears in an earthquake in Morocco, and for Stead and his new assistant it is only the start of Mogul's troubles. Guest stars: Imogen Hassall as Nancy Clucas, Derren Nesbitt as Lanyon, Brian Wilde as Hodges, Geoffrey Palmer as Jeremy Martin, Kenneth Kendall as Newsreader
60	8	"Good Lord, No. It's Illegal"	Raymond Menmuir	David Weir	8 December 1967	Missing
One man's jealousy stands in Mogul's way in Singapore. Stead sets out to destroy him but is torn by personal problems. Guest stars: Tsai Chin as Mei San, Wanda Ventham as Moira
61	9	"Thanks for Nothing"	Roger Jenkins	David Weir	15 December 1967	Missing
In New York, where the Stewarts have settled, Alec looks for a way to unseat Mogul's local manager, while secrets are leaking to Zenith and Stead sends Grandmercy to investigate.
62	10	"Rest You Merry"	Peter Cregeen	Eve Martell	22 December 1967	Missing
A fire at a refinery spoils Mogul's Christmas. Thornton finds his duty at odds with a friendship, and Stead's business deal is put at risk by the arrival of his grandchildren. Guest stars: Wanda Ventham as Moira
63	11	"Who Buys Who?"	James Gatward	Ray Jenkins	29 December 1967	Missing
Thornton risks his job by refusing to put pressure on an old friend for Mogul, but the friend faces greater dangers from others. Guest stars: Bill Fraser as Hotel Manager, Peter Egan as Reporter
64	12	"The Deeper You Dig"	Brian Parker	Hugh Forbes	5 January 1968	Missing
Thornton fights the British government over new plans for the Channel Tunnel and learns a hard lesson from a glamorous woman MP. Guest stars: Barbara Shelley as Joan Maple
65	13	"Kitchener Knew It Well"	Raymond Menmuir	Eve Martell	12 January 1968	Audio only (Note: Missing in picture; an off-air audio recording survives.)
A return to the Sudan stirs forgotten memories for Stead, while Thornton and Eileen O'Rourke have to save a tanker from shipwreck.
66	14	"The Sharp End of the Wedge"	James Gatward	Ian Kennedy Martin	19 January 1968	Exists
Sent to Europe to discover the secret behind a power struggle in Africa, Thornton becomes involved with gun-runners. Guest stars: Joss Ackland as Considine
67	15	"Just a Bunch of Arabs in Kilts"	James Gatward	George Byatt	26 January 1968	Exists
Mogul strikes oil off Scotland, but when Thornton disappears Stead finds there can be more problems at home than in the desert. Guest stars: Fulton Mackay as Mackenzie
68	16	"Not for My Friend – He's Driving"	James Gatward	John Lucarotti	9 February 1968	Exists
Personal conflict flares when Stewart and Grandmercy try to carry a dangerous cargo into the Venezuelan jungle.
69	17	"Stop It, You're Breaking My Heart"	Alan Gibson	John Lucarotti	16 February 1968	Missing
A Russian team starts drilling in a Mogul area of the North Sea, and Stead, who is not well, needs all his wits and strength to get them out. Guest stars: Brian Blessed as Eddie Barnaby
70	18	"A Girl to Warm Your Feet On"	Roger Jenkins	David Weir	23 February 1968	Exists
Thornton takes a chance in Thailand and lands Mogul in trouble. Guest stars: Trevor Bannister as Bob Plater, Nicola Pagett as Christina van der Hoep
71	19	"Give Me the Simple Life"	Roger Jenkins	John Lucarotti	1 March 1968	Missing
Stewart clashes bitterly with Izard and Stead when the biggest project in the world threatens the homes of a hundred people.
72	20	"A Slight Problem with the Press"	James Gatward	Ian Kennedy Martin	8 March 1968	Missing
A false newspaper story causes trouble for Thornton and Izard in Iraq, and Stead and Eileen O'Rourke find that tracing its source is complicated. Guest stars: Patrick Newell as Donald Keynes
73	21	"Never the Twain"	Raymond Menmuir	Anthony Read	15 March 1968	Missing
Izard, newly appointed chairman of Mogul's Indian subsidiary, wants to help the starving people of Bihar, but finds that giving help is harder than he expected. Guest stars: Joss Ackland as Lewis, Saeed Jaffrey as Sunil Seth
74	22	"Cut Off Whose Nose?"	Viktors Ritelis	John Gould	22 March 1968	Missing
The geologist Gavin Malet and his wife Sarah, working as Mogul advisers in Iran, are arrested. Thornton and Grandmercy find the case far from simple, and Stead threatens to pull Mogul out of Iran altogether.
75	23	"The Day the Sea Caught Fire"	Alan Gibson	John Lucarotti	29 March 1968	Exists
Explosions wreck a Mogul rig in the Mediterranean. While Stead deals with the international repercussions, Thornton sails a relief rig through a Caribbean hurricane and Izard runs into trouble in Sicily.
76	24	"The Dispossessed"	James Gatward	Roy Clarke	5 April 1968	Missing
Mogul's senior management grapple with the problem of Wallace Nichols, a man left behind by a changing world. Guest stars: Ronald Fraser as Nichols
77	25	"The Wrecking of the Sierra Nevada"	Alan Gibson	Michael Winder	19 April 1968	Exists
A giant Mogul tanker carrying 100,000 tons of crude oil runs aground off Florida as a hurricane approaches. Thornton, acting for Stead, wants to bomb the ship, but Stewart, backed by a salvage expert, refuses. Guest stars: Anton Diffring as Hans Daniels
78	26	"The Minister of the Crown and the Very Compromising Photograph"	Roger Jenkins	David Weir	3 May 1968	Missing
Stead and Stewart reach the final stage of their battle for power when a senior Cabinet minister threatens Mogul. Guest stars: Geoffrey Palmer as Jeremy Martin

=== Series 5 (1969) ===
Broadcast on BBC1 on Monday evenings.

No. overall	No. in season	Title	Directed by	Written by	Original release date	Archive status
79	1	"A Dirty Old Man – and a Rare Bird"	Michael Hayes	David Weir	6 January 1969	Missing
The Mogul team return, with Stewart joined by a new personal assistant, Dr Ginny Vickers, and Zenith drops a bombshell on Mogul. Guest stars: Bernard Hepton as Mayne
80	2	"Twenty Years Is No Time at All"	Ron Craddock	Anthony Read	13 January 1969	Missing
Thornton is sent to Singapore on a secret mission. Guest stars: Burt Kwouk as Tamira Hitaki
81	3	"How Much Is One Man Worth?"	John Frankau	John Lucarotti	20 January 1969	Missing
When Ted Kihl is trapped in a cave in Malaysia, Thornton turns Mogul's resources and his own skill as an oilman to a rescue operation. Guest stars: Sheila Gish as Sue Kihl, Johnny Briggs as Tim Devlin, Walter Gotell as Ian Webster, Frank Williams as Finch
82	4	"If He Hollers – Let Him Go"	Ridley Scott	Tom Clarke	27 January 1969	Missing
Ghislaine Foss, the glamorous wife of Mogul's founder, arrives in London in the middle of a takeover battle and brings chaos, particularly for Alec Stewart. Guest stars: Edward Fox as Jocelyn Traddle
83	5	"A Very Special Relationship"	Henri Safran	Roy Russell	3 February 1969	Missing
A case of fraud takes Izard to Paris and Malta, and Stead's plans for expansion in Europe as part of his fight against Zenith suffer a setback when a French multi-millionaire marries a film starlet.
84	6	"There's a Nasty Word – Love"	Robert Tronson	David Weir	10 February 1969	Missing
In Japan, Stewart and Roz are caught between East and West, and the samurai background of Tamira Hitaki, a survivor of Hiroshima, causes problems for Mogul. Guest stars: Burt Kwouk as Tamira Hitaki
85	7	"You're Not Going to Believe This, But..."	Lennie Mayne	John Lucarotti	17 February 1969	Missing (Note: The transmitted episode is missing, but a remake made with a different cast as a technical trial survives.)
The manager of Mogul's refinery in Malaysia insults the local sultan, forgets things and turns against Thornton, an old friend who tries to help. When Thornton finds the explanation he can hardly believe it.
86	8	"Take Over Is Two Four Letter Words"	Cyril Coke	Roy Russell	24 February 1969	Missing
Redundant employees occupy a Mogul distribution depot, and what begins as a small protest quickly turns to tension and danger.
87	9	"Everybody Is That Kind of Man"	Moira Armstrong	George Byatt	3 March 1969	Missing
Stewart and Stead are accused of bribery over an important refinery project in Scotland, and Zenith may be behind attempts to corrupt a Scottish official.
88	10	"So You Think You're One of Us"	Antony Kearey	Ludovic Peters	10 March 1969	Missing
Thornton becomes a pawn in the struggle between African rebels and the Portuguese authorities in Angola. Guest stars: Roger Delgado as Souza, Norman Beaton as Amos Tucker
89	11	"They've More Than Their Assets Frozen"	Henri Safran	John Lucarotti	17 March 1969	Exists
Thornton faces great hardship drilling in Alaska, knowing that Mogul's whole future may depend on whether he succeeds.
90	12	"There's This Bird See"	Paul Ciappessoni	John Elliot	24 March 1969	Missing
A British-owned island in the Indian Ocean seems an ideal drilling site, with no population and no foreign government, but its birds spell trouble for Mogul.
91	13	"You Want a Clockwork Nightingale"	Paul Ciappessoni	David Fisher	31 March 1969	Missing
Izard sets out to further the ambitions of Zeke, the office boy at Mogul's South African subsidiary, expecting to come up against apartheid, but an unexpected obstacle calls for unusual forcefulness from him.
92	14	"Don't Ask, Take"	Ron Craddock	David Fisher	14 April 1969	Missing
Stead takes up the challenge of bringing an eccentric inventor, Augustus Walker, into Mogul, and has to find out what Mogul can offer him.
93	15	"Dr. Liebling, I Presume"	Ken Hannam	David Fisher	21 April 1969	Missing
In Papua, Thornton faces headhunters among other hazards, and has to discover why the Australian district commissioner wants to stop him seeing Dr Liebling. Guest stars: Jack Shepherd as Police Constable
94	16	"You Can't Trust Women"	Cyril Coke	David Weir	28 April 1969	Missing
Mogul and Zenith both seek the hand of Ghislaine Foss, who holds vital Mogul shares as the battle between the two companies nears its climax, and Stewart finds trouble on every side.
95	17	"Really She Did, She Really Did"	Moira Armstrong	David Weir	5 May 1969	Audio only (Note: Missing in picture; an off-air audio recording survives.)
Stead takes Mogul's entire board across the Atlantic on the Queen Elizabeth 2 for the decisive meeting in the Mogul–Zenith merger battle. Guest stars: Bernard Hepton as Mayne, Jackie Trent as Singer
96	18	"Some of the Mud Is Bound to Stick"	Lennie Mayne	John Lucarotti	12 May 1969	Missing
The Algerian authorities accuse Alec Stewart of spying, and Mogul denies it.
97	19	"Lord, What a Tangled Web"	Lennie Mayne	John Lucarotti	19 May 1969	Missing
Stead revisits Berlin, where he served at the end of the war and where Mogul is now drilling for natural gas, and an incident from 1945 is dragged up in an attempt to discredit him.
98	20	"And One Wise Man Came Out from the East"	Ken Hannam	John Lucarotti	2 June 1969	Missing
Stead sends Thornton straight from Alaska to Western Australia, where he is lost in the outback without a radio or salt tablets and begins to question his loyalty to Mogul.
99	21	"Let's All Drop Out Together"	Robert Tronson	John Lucarotti	9 June 1969	Missing
Exhausted, Thornton resigns from Mogul and retreats to a beach in Fiji, and Stead tries to persuade his best troubleshooter to change his mind.
100	22	"She'll Be Right Mate"	Ron Craddock	John Lucarotti	16 June 1969	Missing
Thornton returns to Mogul, hoping for a seat on the board, and is sent into a dispute with the New Zealand government over moving a drilling rig to Indonesia, where the man leading a mutiny is an old friend.
101	23	"A Very Bad Day for Travelling"	Frank Cox	Anthony Read	23 June 1969	Missing
Thornton is sent to Ceylon to find out why Mogul's manager there is making no effort to win an important contract, with authority to sack him if necessary. Guest stars: Maurice Denham as Henry Burton, Saeed Jaffrey as Anton Salgado
102	24	"This Place Is a Paradise, Mister"	Malcolm Taylor	David Weir	30 June 1969	Exists
Stead sends Thornton to a Caribbean island whose ruler, "King" George Watt, wants no Mogul invasion, and Thornton is taken prisoner. Guest stars: Iain Cuthbertson as King Watt, Sheila Steafel as Dr. Leduc
103	25	"They Call Me Israel"	Lennie Mayne	David Weir	7 July 1969	Missing
On holiday in Israel to recover from his imprisonment in Algeria, Stewart runs into fresh trouble that threatens his whole future.
104	26	"Over the Hill"	Moira Armstrong	John Elliot	14 July 1969	Missing
In the last episode of the series, Stead's life hangs in the balance and almost everyone's future at Mogul is in doubt. Guest stars: Michael Sheard as German

=== Series 6 (1970) ===
Broadcast on BBC1 on Monday evenings, in colour.

No. overall	No. in season	Title	Directed by	Written by	Original release date	Archive status
105	1	"The Slick and the Dread"	Roger Jenkins	John Elliot	18 May 1970	Missing
Stead's restful trip to the Caribbean on a Mogul supertanker brings unexpected developments. Guest stars: Ray McAnally as Bruce Millway, Windsor Davies as Jimmy Davies
106	2	"A Pig in a Pipe"	Lennie Mayne	Anthony Read	25 May 1970	Missing
Stead's visit to a Mogul refinery in Africa causes problems for Thornton when a sacked engineer threatens to blow up the refinery during a ceremony.
107	3	"Camelot on a Clear Day"	John Matthews	David Fisher	1 June 1970	Exists
A famous leprosy hospital run by the elderly Dr Hoffmann lies in the path of Mogul's exploration in East Africa, and Izard, one of his many admirers, has to deal with the problem with Thornton's help. Guest stars: Frank Thornton as Television Interviewer
108	4	"Who Did You Say Inherits the Earth?"	Moira Armstrong	John Lucarotti	8 June 1970	Missing
A lone Eskimo with a high-powered rifle disrupts Mogul's drilling in Alaska, and at an oilmen's convention in Fairbanks Stead and Thornton find there are human problems too. Guest stars: Stubby Kaye as Randolph Capers, Nadim Sawalha as Sheik Abdul Rahaman
109	5	"The Price of a Bride"	Lennie Mayne	David Fisher	15 June 1970	Missing
When the government of the African state of Manzaya decides to expel Mogul's manager, Ralph Grant, who has a South African wife, he, Jack Robbins, who lives up-country with an African girl, and Thornton himself all face the question of what a bride costs. Guest stars: James Beck as Jack Robbins, Rudolph Walker as Gregory Amolo
110	6	"Operation "Black Gold""	Lennie Mayne	John Elliot	22 June 1970	Missing
Standing in for Thornton on a trip to Ebon, Izard is captured by mercenaries in an African civil war, and Mogul's efforts to free him centre on Jane Webb, Stead's former secretary, and her husband, a mercenary officer.
111	7	"We Also Need Experts"	Roger Jenkins	John Elliot	29 June 1970	Missing
The arrival of management efficiency experts sets off rumours of redundancy at Mogul head office. Guest stars: Peter Sallis as Henry Wynn
112	8	"I'm Glad I'm Just an Oilman"	Frank Cox	George Byatt	6 July 1970	Missing
In the desert, Thornton discovers that water can be as valuable as oil, and as explosive.
113	9	"Boys and Girls Come Out to Play"	Moira Armstrong	David Fisher	13 July 1970	Exists
Mogul's future in South America depends on pinning down a multi-millionaire, a pursuit that takes Stead, Thornton and Izard to a health farm, the Cannes Film Festival, a casino and a Scottish cattle sale. Guest stars: Barbara Shelley as Lita Perez
114	10	"The Dangerous Green Impala"	Lennie Mayne	David Fisher	20 July 1970	Missing
In Haiti, Stead is drawn into a dangerous battle for control of Mogul's local company.
115	11	"A Truly Exotic Development"	Paul Ciappessoni	John Elliot	27 July 1970	Missing
Alec and Roz Stewart, now in the Caribbean, return. Mogul's rig on the island has been sabotaged, and Stead sends Alec's old rival Thornton to investigate. Guest stars: Sam Kydd as George Bartlett
116	12	"That's Africa Baby"	Frank Cox	John Lucarotti	3 August 1970	Missing
Tribal quarrels, witch-doctors, political double-dealing and a mysterious blow-back on a decrepit rig confront Mogul deep in the African bush.
117	13	"They Shall Not Pass"	Henri Safran	John Lucarotti	10 August 1970	Missing
A lock-keeper and veteran of Verdun, Albert Lefloch, halts France's canal system with a one-man strike, holding up a consignment of secret oil for Concorde, while in England another old man stops the refinery that produces it. Izard and Stead deal with the problems themselves.
118	14	"Let's See the Colour of Your Money"	Roger Jenkins	John Lucarotti	17 August 1970	Missing
Chinese, American, Rhodesian and African interests make negotiating a refinery contract in Kinsaka almost impossible, and many of the city's spies seem to be after the men from Mogul.
119	15	"Hey, We've Got a Problem Here"	Lennie Mayne	John Lucarotti	24 August 1970	Missing
Mogul is testing a giant submarine tanker to carry oil out from under the Alaskan ice. Stead, Thornton and Izard visit it in the Caribbean, and things go dangerously wrong on Stead's first dive.
120	16	"The Order of the Good Time"	Douglas Camfield	John Lucarotti	31 August 1970	Missing
Feeling the pressures of industry, pollution and overcrowding, Stead finds what seems the perfect site for a new Mogul refinery in Nova Scotia, and takes time to think.
121	17	"Injury to the Nation"	Cyril Coke	John Elliot	7 September 1970	Missing
State secrets have leaked to a foreign power, and a Ministry of Defence investigator, Commander Fayne, interrogates Stead, Thornton and Izard at Mogul House, convinced the leak came from one of them. Guest stars: Patrick Allen as Commander Fayne

=== Series 7 (1971–72) ===
Broadcast on BBC1 on Monday evenings, in colour.

No. overall	No. in season	Title	Directed by	Written by	Original release date	Archive status
122	1	"Pie in the Sea – Part One"	Roger Jenkins	John Elliot	13 September 1971	Exists
An oil find in Scandinavia brings problems for Mogul, and a new man poses a threat to Stead. The first of two parts. Guest stars: Catherine Schell as Kirsten Hansen, Wanda Ventham as Moira Hart
123	2	"Pie in the Sea – Part Two"	Roger Jenkins	John Elliot	20 September 1971	Exists
The threat to Stead becomes real when Langley takes up his post as deputy chairman, and Izard reaches the end of the road. Guest stars: Catherine Schell as Kirsten Hansen
124	3	"It's Thumbs Down for You, Pizzaro"	Frank Cox	John Lucarotti	27 September 1971	Exists
Trouble for Thornton in the Peruvian Andes gives Langley his first test as deputy chairman.
125	4	"In the Shade of the Old Oak Tree"	Frank Cox	Anthony Read	11 October 1971	Exists
An apparently rich strike in the Bay of Biscay brings danger for Thornton and Langley.
126	5	"The Bent Bonanza"	Lennie Mayne	David Fisher	18 October 1971	Exists
A computer brings Thornton and Izard into contact with an ambitious girl and an extraordinary man in the Australian outback.
127	6	"A Touch of the Nelsons"	Ben Rea	John Lucarotti	25 October 1971	Exists
Thornton and HMS Ark Royal race to the rescue of a stricken tanker.
128	7	"The One with the Waggly Tail"	Lennie Mayne	David Fisher	1 November 1971	Exists
In Mexico City, Izard faces the toughest test of his career, in business and in his private life. Guest stars: Barbara Shelley as Lita Perez
129	8	"Shangri-La and All That Jazz"	David Proudfoot	David Fisher	8 November 1971	Exists
Thornton finds that even a Polynesian paradise has its share of difficult people.
130	9	"Monopoly with Real Money"	Cyril Coke	David Fisher	15 November 1971	Exists
Mogul sets about raising money, which proves far from simple.
131	10	"Personally I Think He Looks Like Me"	Frank Cox	John Lucarotti	22 November 1971	Exists
In Corsica, the birthplace of Napoleon, Thornton, Izard and Langley are not allowed to forget it. Guest stars: Philip Madoc as Ignace Mattzini
132	11	"Pretend It Never Happened"	Frank Cox	John Elliot	29 November 1971	Exists
Izard's plan to spend a holiday in the South of France nursing his wife back to health and forgetting Mogul is hard to keep, even on a camp site.
133	12	"Weekends Are for Taking Off"	Frank Cox	John Lucarotti	6 December 1971	Exists
Stead and Langley find they cannot always keep their private lives apart from business, even at weekends. Guest stars: Wanda Ventham as Moira Hart
134	13	"Tapu"	Lennie Mayne	Joe Lorigan	13 December 1971	Exists
Mogul's New Zealand pipeline runs into violent opposition from Maori interests.
135	14	"We and Them"	Cyril Coke	John Elliot	20 December 1971	Exists
A wage claim at Mogul's biggest chemical works puts Stead into an unlikely alliance with a communist shop steward, in head-on conflict with Langley. Guest stars: Windsor Davies as Aneurin Griffith
136	15	"Whatever Became of the Year 2000?"	Roger Jenkins	John Elliot	3 January 1972	Exists
Brian Stead may have reached the end of the road.

== External link ==
- The Troubleshooters at IMDb
