= The Rat Catchers =

British TV spy drama series (1966–1967)

- Starring: Gerald Flood; Philip Stone; Glyn Owen
- Country of origin: United Kingdom
- No. of series: 2
- No. of episodes: 25 (23 missing)

Production
- Producer: Cyril Coke
- Running time: 60 minutes
- Production company: Rediffusion

Original release
- Network: ITV
- Release: 2 February 1966 – 9 March 1967

The Rat Catchers is a 1960s British television drama series made by Rediffusion and broadcast on ITV. The series was not networked, playing on different days of the week in London from other regions. It is about a top secret British Intelligence Unit. It receives orders from the Prime Minister and, without questioning, proceeds to battle enemy spies, saboteurs, and others to protect the security of Great Britain and the Western Alliance.

== Format ==
The Rat Catchers is an organisation based at Whitehall in Central London but officially didn't exist, being denied at the highest level as they worked with the greatest secrecy.

The focus is on three major characters:

- Peregrine Pascale Smith (portrayed by Gerald Flood) is an Oxford University-educated managing director with 12 years' experience under his belt.
- Brigadier H. St. J. Davidson (portrayed by Philip Stone) is the emotionless analytical brains behind the group.
- Richard William Hurst (portrayed by Glyn Owen), formerly a superintendent at Scotland Yard.

The show begins with the arrival of Richard Hurst, the new recruit to the team, an ex-policeman who was said to have gone by the book whilst in the force. However, the secrecy in the organisation's setup finds Hurst somewhat out of step with the other two, including not really knowing which of the other two really has the authority. Officially, Hurst is an employee of Smith's company: Transworld Electronics, leading to some confusion; in episode 3, he is not sure whether Smith or the Brigadier is his boss. This antagonistic approach leads him to feel left out, a situation not helped by Brigadier Davidson insistence that Hurst knows only the bare minimum about the organisation and is keen to keep it that way.

The Brigadier's catch phrase is "Say so, if you understand me." which he repeats each time he sent Smith and Hurst on a mission to ensure his orders are carried out to the letter. This was mimicked on the single version recording of the theme tune which opens with the mimicked "Say Yes, if you understand me".

The show aired in two series comprising 25 x 60-minute episodes. Stories continued over multiple episodes in two or three parts, with cliff-hanger endings.

== Production ==
Made by – Rediffusion TV Network Production (part of the UK's then ITV network)
Producer – Cyril Coke
Director – James Ormerod
Theme music – Johnny Pearson (composer and arranger)

== Series one ==
Broadcast 31 January 1966 to 25 April 1966, on Mondays on Rediffusion, London between 8 pm and 9 pm.
Other ITV regions showed it on the following Wednesday.
1. Ticket to Madrid
Written by Raymond Bowers
Ex-policeman Richard Hurst arrives and is sent on a mission. In Madrid, he and the beautiful Miss Larks (Jan Waters) come up against the cold horror of the world of espionage and deception. Also stars Norman Scace and Jeffrey Gardiner. This is one of only two surviving complete episodes.

2. The Captain Morales Story
Written by Raymond Bowers
In Madrid, Hurst comes face to face with the violence of his new job. Also stars Edward de Souza, James Kerry and Peter Dennis.

3. The Unwitting Courier
Written by Raymond Bowers
A beautiful FBI agent causes the Brigadier trouble sending a secret document to his Madrid contact. She is after the Alpha Crowd who the Brigadier sees as neither friend nor foe. He sets Hurst to following an American couple played by: Jeanne Moody and David Bauer. Also stars James Kerry as Alpha, Victor Platt and Tsai Chin. This is one of only two surviving complete episodes.

4. Madrid Delivery
Written by Raymond Bowers
With the vital information passed on, Hurst is ready to go home but finds himself in trouble and needing the Brigadier's help. Also stars: Tom Gill, Patricia English, Alex Scott and Victor Pemberton.

5. The Missing Agent
Written by Paul Lee
Hurst and Smith search for missing agent Dorothy Hansen (Pamela Sholto) in Stockholm but others don't want her found. Also stars Anne Dyson, Wanda Ventham and John Doye.

6. The Baited Hook
Written by Paul Lee
With danger closing in on them, Hurst and Smith search for Hansen and meet a student with a gun, ready to use it. Also stars Sandor Elès, Stella Courtnay, Wanda Ventham and Jayne Sofiano.

7. The Umbrella
Written by Jeremy Paul
The Umbrella Project when in operation will safeguard Britain from aerial attack but Hurst and Smith have to find a hidden saboteur who threatens to breach security. Also stars Robert Raglan, Ronald Howard, Tenniel Evans and Clifford Earl.

8. Thieves' Market
Written by Jeremy Paul
Hurst travels to Lisbon to uncover a traitor while Smith tries to find a connection between a Nazi General's memoirs and a golf bag flown to Lisbon. Also stars Wendy Gifford, Edward Underdown, James Bree, Gertan Klauber, Max Kirby and Patrick Godfrey.

9. Return of Evil
Written by Jeremy Paul
Still searching for the traitor, the trail leads to the threat of the return of a man from the past who still looms large and could destroy Europe. Also stars Monica Grey, Carmilla Brockman, John Abineri, Frederick Schrecker, Martin Friend, Madeleine Mills and Geoffrey Palmer.

10. The Edge of Disaster
Written by Paul Lee
It hangs in the air around us. It is invisible and yet pointed with deadly accuracy. Can Hurst and Smith save the nation? Also stars Reginald Marsh, Sylvia Kay, Morris Perry and Basil Moss.

11. Operation Lost Souls
Written by Victor Canning
Following a trail of traitors to Geneva, Hurst and Smith find the HQ of the people behind the brain drain is in Ireland. Also stars Patricia Haines, Bernard Kay, Edward Burnham and Tom Watson.

12. Operation Irish Triangle
Written by Victor Canning
The operation in Ireland looks to be nothing but trouble and they get more than they bargained for when Arlette Maylam (Patricia Haines) shows her true colours. Also stars John Macklin, Alan Gifford, Bernard Kay and Eugene Deckers.

13. Operation Big Fish
Written by Victor Canning
Everything is set for the big kill but Hurst and Smith are still in the dark over it. Can they stop one of history's most spectacular crimes? Also stars Rachel Gurney, Edward Palmer, Bernard Kay, Alan Gifford, P.G. Stephens, Lorne Cossette, Brian Badcoe and Robert MacLeod.

== Series two ==
Broadcast 8 December 1966 to 9 March 1967, on Thursdays between 9.40 pm and 10.40 pm
in some ITV regions, Rediffusion, London showed it on the next day, Fridays, at 8pm
14. Rendezvous Vienna
Written by Jeremy Paul
Also stars Geoffrey Palmer, Keith Ashley, Maurice Brownin, Carl Rigg and Peter Thomas

15. Showdown Vienna
Written by Jeremy Paul
Hurst and Smith are on a find and destroy mission but run up against the dangerous Leopold Donner (Frank Gatliff). Also stars Lucy Fleming and Vernon Dobtcheff.

16. Mission to Madeira
Written by Victor Canning
Working undercover, Hurst infiltrates the dangerous Midas Consortium but can he trust the lovely Lea (Hannah Gordon)? Also stars Richard Warner, John Abineri, John Brandon and John Slavid.

17. Death in Madeira
Written by Victor Canning
Hurst seems to have fallen for Lea and wants to resign but the Brigadier has other plans with unpleasant results. Also stars Frederick Treves, John Abineri, Susan Engel and Conrad Monk.

18. Midnight Over Madeira
Written by Victor Canning
Hurst and the Brigadier clash as The Midas Consortium plan the death of a man, which will send the world's stock markets crashing and make them a huge fortune. Also stars Kevin Stoney, Jerry Stovin, Susan Engel and John Abineri.

19. Wednesday in Dubrovnik
Written by Raymond Bowers
Faces from the past threaten Britain's Secret Service including the Brigadier's group. Also stars James Kerry, Jeffrey Gardiner and Jacqueline Ellis.

20. Murder in Mostar
Written by Raymond Bowers
A very unpleasant murder and Hurst and Smith are in revolt as the Brigadier orders them to eliminate a public figure. Also stars Reginald Marsh, Derren Nesbitt and Michael Peake.

21. Dead-End – Dubrovnik
Written by Raymond Bowers
The Brigadier forms a strange alliance to get rid of a common enemy but the outcome is violence of the worst kind as death stalks the streets. Also stars James Kerry, Reginald Marsh and Derren Nesbitt.

22. Big Grab – Amsterdam
Written by Raymond Bowers
An American secret agent carrying vital information in his head vanishes. America presses for action but the Brigadier seems unconcerned. Who is the mysterious Vol (Cyril Shaps)? Also stars Raymond Huntley, James Kerry, Bill Hutchinson, Alan Gerrard and Simon Cain.

23. Retribution Amsterdam
Written by Jeremy Paul
An American spy as a hostage held by an enemy agent as brilliant as the Brigadier. Hurst and Smith must follow strict orders to prevent the worst happening. Also stars Cyril Shaps, Hugh McDermott, Toke Townley and Bill Hutchinson.

24. The Heel of Achilles
Written by Stanley Miller
Hurst and Smith find violence in Athens as helped by a turncoat spy (Dora Reisser), they seek the man behind an international espionage ring to stop the beaches of Corfu running red with blood. Also stars Wolfe Morris, Ralph Michael, Anthony Marlowe and Hilary Tindall. Just poor copies of the action sequences survive of this episode.

25. The Seven Pillars of Hercules
Written by Stanley Miller
Hurst and Smith are after a man hiding in the mountains of Greece but so is Madame Achmet (Catherine Lacey) who is a very dangerous woman. Also stars: Wolfe Morris, Ralph Michael, Esmond Knight, Patrick Godfrey and Paul Tann.

26. The Mask of Agamemnon
Written by Stanley Miller
Hurst and Smith must decide whether to try and rescue the man held on Madame Achmet's yacht, knowing the Brigadier wants him dead. Death and destruction follow. Also stars Wolfe Morris.

== Proposed DVD release ==
NetworkDVD, as they were called at the time, announced "The Rat Catchers" as the subject of a forthcoming release feature, including a clip from the recovered series 1 episode "The Unwitting Courier", along with notification that more information would follow in due course. However, after a few weeks this page disappeared from their website and all linked mention of any potential DVD release was scrubbed from the website a few weeks afterwards.

== Surviving episodes ==
It is believed that the only copies of episodes which have survived are 'Ticket to Madrid' and 'The Unwitting Courier'. The latter was spotted on a torrent site and apparently originated from a VHS copy of a 16mm film print obtained at a film convention.

In addition to the above, the action sequences from episode 23 (series 2) "The Heel of Achilles" survive as poor quality film copies.

== Theme tune ==
Performed by pianist Johnny Pearson, the full-length recording of "The Rat Catchers theme" tune was released on [Columbia] DB 8751 ([EMI]). It failed to make the charts. The recording opens with the line "Say Yes, if you understand me" (mimicking Brigadier Davidson's catch-phrase line, "Say so, if you understand me"), before launching onto a full piano and strings-led theme.

== Books ==
Two books were released to accompany the series during the time it was broadcast; 'All in a Day's Work' and 'The End of the Fourth Reich' both bylined "David Ray." As no other books of the era with this byline exist, and the styles of the two books are markedly different, Ray seems to be a house pseudonym assigned to the series, to be used by multiple authors.
