= Peter Dennis =

English actor

- Born: 25 October 1933; Dorking, Surrey, England
- Died: 18 April 2009 (aged 75); Shadow Hills, Los Angeles, California, USA
- Occupation: Actor

Peter John Dennis (25 October 1933 – 18 April 2009) was a Screen Actors Guild Award and Drama-Logue Award winning English film, television, theatre and voice actor. His extensive career spanned both sides of the Atlantic with projects ranging from The Avengers to Sideways. He was perhaps best known for his more than three decades association performing the works of A. A. Milne on stage in his one-man show entitled Bother! The Brain of Pooh.

== Early life ==
Peter Dennis was born in Dorking, Surrey, the son of Michael Henry Dennis, a mechanical engineer, and Violet Frances Lockwood, a housewife. He was one of four children including two brothers, Michael and David, and a sister, Dorothy.

His early education was in a Roman Catholic convent. He continued his early studies in Portobello Road, London at the North Kensington Secondary School, until the age of 14. He spent the next four years training as an accountant and as a surveyor. While employed at T. S. Appleton & Son Ltd. in Shepherd's Bush, he was called up for his national service in the British Army.

He served as a Sergeant in Nigeria from January 1952 to March 1958, Royal Army Ordnance Corps, Royal Army Service Corps. His duties included drill and weapons training, shorthand writing in the service of Lieutenant General Sir Roderick McLeod and General Sir Nigel Poett, Director of Military Operations, and as a Personal Assistant to General Sir Kenneth Exham, General Officer Commanding the Royal West African Frontier Force, Nigerian Military Forces.

Upon his return to civilian life, he worked as Personal Assistant to Harry Arkle, European Managing Director, Canadian Pacific Railway and Bill Nicol, Deputy Chairman of Guest, Keen & Nettlefolds, Redditch, near Birmingham.

On his 29th birthday, Dennis saw his first play, a production of Look Back in Anger at the Birmingham Repertory Theatre starring Derek Jacobi, and dictated his resignation the following day. By the following autumn, he was in attendance at the Royal Academy of Dramatic Art graduating two years later in 1965.

== Career ==
After graduating from RADA, he returned to the Birmingham Rep to play numerous leading roles. He went on to perform at the Everyman Theatre, Liverpool, the Liverpool Repertory Theatre, and in London's West End. He also began to be a regular presence on British television, appearing in The Avengers among many other shows.

14 October 1976 marked the premiere of his one-man show Bother! The Brain of Pooh at the ADC Theatre, Cambridge, given in celebration of the 50th anniversary of the publication of Winnie-the-Pooh written by A. A. Milne. It contained selected readings from When We Were Very Young, Winnie-the-Pooh, Now We Are Six, and The House at Pooh Corner.

At the invitation of Anna Strasberg, Head of the Actors Studio, Bother! received its American premiere in December 1986 at the Lee Strasberg Theatre and Film Institute in Hollywood, where it was honoured with the Drama-Logue Award and the Los Angeles Theatre Award. He continued to perform Bother! throughout the following decades at more than eighty venues throughout America and Europe, from the Hollywood Bowl under the baton of conductor George Daugherty to the Palace of Westminster in London at the invitation of the Prime Minister.

His American television career grew to include appearances on a number of popular series including Friends, Murphy Brown, Alias, Seinfeld, Prime Suspect, and Murder, She Wrote. Highlights of his film career include Sideways and Shrek.

Dennis often wore bow ties, and many of his roles featured him wearing one.

== Death ==
Dennis died on 18 April 2009 in Shadow Hills, Los Angeles, California, USA.

== Awards ==
- LA Weekly Theatre Award
- Drama-Logue Award
- Corporation for Public Broadcasting Silver Award
- Achievement of Merit Ohio State Award
- Audie Award nominee
- Parents' Choice Award Gold Award
- Screen Actors Guild Awards - Ensemble, Sideways

== Filmography ==
- Confessions of a Window Cleaner (1974) – Waiter
- The Stud (1978) – Marc
- Scandalous (1984) – Maitre D'
- A Man Called Sarge (1990) – Montgomery
- The Rainbow Thief (1990) – Winter
- The Emissary: A Biblical Epic (1997) – Master
- The Effects of Magic (1998) – Gough
- Second Generation (2000) – Bus conductor
- Shrek (2001) – Ogre Hunter (voice)
- Hellborn (2003) – Dr. Flannery
- Sideways (2004) – Leslie Brough
- Psychonauts (2005) – Collie (voice)
- Eragon (2006) – (voice)
- Man in the Chair (2007) – Bernie
- Monster Safari (2007) – Basil Pennyfarthing
- Ten Inch Hero (2007) – Mr. Julius
- Beowulf (2007) – (voice)

== Television ==
- No Hiding Place (1965) – Police doctor
- The Rat Catchers (1966) – Teniente
- The Avengers (1967) – Private
- The Troubleshooters (1968) – TV Interviewer
- Detective (1968) – Personal Assistant
- Hadleigh (1973–1976) – Sutton
- Hold the Front Page (1974) – The Judge
- Whodunnit? (1974) – Mr. Coleman || Episode: "It's Quicker By Train"
- Dial M for Murder (1974) – Insp. Palmer
- How's Your Father (1975) – Doctor Clegg
- The Famous Five (1978) – Roland
- Grange Hill (1982) – Mr Brocklehurst
- Crown Court (1982) – Dr. Edwin Harper
- Never the Twain (1982) – Vicar
- Yes Minister (1982) – Undersecretary Air Division
- The Cleopatras (1983) – Diomedes
- Minder (1984–1985) – Club owner / Geoffrey
- Minder on the Orient Express (1985) – Club owner (uncredited)
- C.A.T.S. Eyes (1985–87) – Hathcott / Desmond Proudfoot
- The Great Escape II: The Untold Story (1988) – Group Capt. Massey
- War and Remembrance (1988) – Gen. Sir Bernard Law Montgomery
- Prime Suspect (1991) – Toastmaster
- To Be the Best (1991) – Doctor
- Murder, She Wrote (1992) – Albert
- Murphy Brown (1992) – Psychiatrist #3
- Melrose Place (1992) – Jeweler #1
- The Adventures of Brisco County, Jr. (1993–1994) – Reginald
- Acapulco H.E.A.T. (1994) – Dr. Monroe
- Young Indiana Jones and the Hollywood Follies (1994) – Pete
- Prehysteria! 3 (1995) – Snooty Driver
- Saved by the Bell: The New Class (1995) – Mr Hathaway
- Mad TV (1995) – Announcer
- Step by Step (1996) – Auctioneer
- Townies (1996) – Dealer
- Friends (1996) – Sherman Whitfield
- Mr. Rhodes (1996) – Flemings
- Star Trek: Voyager (1996-2001) – Admiral Hendricks / Isaac Newton
- Profiler (1997) – Dr. Joel Kaiser
- In the House (1997) – Violinist
- Tracey Takes On... (1997) – Lord Percy
- Family Matters (1997) – Captain Hightower
- Seinfeld (1997) – Lew
- H.M.S. Pinafore (1997) – Sailor
- Felicity (1999) – Star Wars Fan
- Alias (2001) – Professor Bloom

== Theatre ==
- The Body (2004)
- Bother! The Brain of Pooh (1976–2009)
- Speak of the Devil

== Recordings ==
- "The Complete Works of Winnie-the-Pooh" by A. A. Milne
- "The Tigger Movie", Walt Disney Records
- "102 Dalmatians", Walt Disney Records
- "The Seven Deadly Sins", Jazz Suite with Phil Woods
- "The Children’s Suite" by Phil Woods
- "The Strange Affliction" by Norman Corwin, with Samantha Eggar, Carl Reiner and Norman Lloyd
