= Letters from the Dead =

1968 British TV drama series

- Genre: Drama
- Written by: Ian Kennedy Martin
- Directed by: James Gatward
- Country of origin: United Kingdom
- Original language: English
- No. of series: 1
- No. of episodes: 6

Production
- Producer: James Gatward
- Editor: Mike Womersley
- Production company: Southern Television

Original release
- Network: ITV
- Release: 24 August – 28 September 1968

Related
- The Capone Investment

Letters from the Dead is a 1968 British drama series written by Ian Kennedy Martin and produced by Southern Television for ITV.

== Plot ==
Peter Allery arrives in Leysham to see if his ex-wife has recovered after an illness. He stays long enough to find himself involved in a brutal murder. The murder seems to be motiveless, but Chief Inspector Reaygo thinks it may be connected with a strange religious sect, Space Spirit Meditation whose headquarters are in the village.

== Cast ==
- Norman Bowler as Peter Allery
- Richard Coleman as Herrick
- Michale Graham as Sgt. Maitland
- Glyn Owen as Chief Insp. Reaygo
- John Stratton as Damien Anthony
- Jayne Sofiano as Pippa Hales
- Anthony Newlands as Robert Lorraine
- Anne Brooke as Miss Doan
- Leon Collins as Tom Healey
- Jan Carey as Kay Allery
- Stacy Davies as Inspector Rowlands
- Fulton Mackay as Reverend Toynbee
- Shelagh Wilcocks as Mrs Arding

== Episodes ==
No.	Title	Original release date	Archive status
1	"The First to Go"	24 August 1968	Incomplete
2	"Temple of Mystery"	31 August 1968	Incomplete
3	"A Killer Calls"	7 September 1968	Incomplete
4	"A Night for Violence"	14 September 1968	Exists
5	"One Man Walking"	21 September 1968	Missing
6	"The Final Victims"	28 September 1968	Exists

== Missing episodes ==
Only episodes 4 and 6 survive in full while sequences survive of the first 3. TV Brain states that episodes 4 and 6 were originally made in colour and now survive in black and white.

== Follow up ==
Glyn Owen would reprise his role as Reaygo in The Capone Investment in 1974. Richard Coleman would also appear in The Capone Investment but in a different role.
