= Roger Jenkins (director) =

British theatre and television director (1931–2022)

Roger Ernest Jenkins (May 1931 – 21 December 2022) was a British theatre and television director who directed multiple British television productions from the mid-1950s until the 1980s as well as directing, producing, and filming numerous stage plays.

== Life and career ==
=== Early life and education ===
Jenkins was born in May 1931. He was educated at Bristol Grammar School, and subsequently attended St Catharine's College, Cambridge, where he read English from 1950 to 1953. It was a time when the Cambridge amateur theatre scene was dominated by Peter Hall, with whom Jenkins shared rooms in college. During his time at Cambridge, Jenkins acted in and directed numerous productions for the Cambridge University Amateur Dramatic Club (ADC) and the Marlowe Society. After leaving Cambridge in 1953, Jenkins worked as a producer trainee for BBC Radio for two years. In addition to his work as a studio manager, he acted in numerous amateur productions at London theatres and in 1961 returned to Cambridge to direct a Marlowe Society production of Jean Anouilh's The Lark with the young Ian McKellen as Warwick.

=== Years at Associated-Rediffusion ===
In 1955, Jenkins became a staff director at Associated-Rediffusion, the UK's first commercial television company, a position he was to hold for the next five years. He directed four programmes in the first week of commercial television and directed children's programmes with Rolf Harris and Charlie Drake, and light entertainment programmes with Cy Grant. Jenkins also directed the first schools' series in the UK, The Ballad Story and the first schools' play, Macbeth (with William Devlin, Mary Morris and Miles Malleson), followed by Dr Faustus (with Paul Rogers, Judi Dench, Patrick Troughton), She Stoops to Conquer (with Paul Daneman, Jane Downs), and Twelfth Night (with John Wood, Laurence Hardy, Emrys James).

For Associated-Rediffusion's drama department, Jenkins directed nine episodes of Murder Bag, six episodes of Crime Street and one episode of their successor No Hiding Place with Raymond Francis. He also directed two television plays for the company in 1959—The Guardsman's Cup of Tea by Thomas Browne (with Michael Craig, Barbara Shelley, Margot Grahame, January 1959) and The Extra Grave (with Michael Gough, Isabel Dean, July 1959).

=== Freelance career ===
In November 1960, Jenkins resigned from Associated-Rediffusion to work as a freelance television, theatre, and film director. Over the next 30 years he directed or produced numerous episodes of television series. His directing credits included Z-Cars, Out of the Unknown, The Troubleshooters, Poldark, Coronation Street and Howard's Way. He also made instructional videos and worked as an executive producer for Trans World International. Through his film company, Hyperion Films, he produced The Great Event, a documentary on the Badminton Horse Trials, for BBC television and produced and directed development work for a Channel 4 series on British Library manuscripts.

=== Later years ===
Jenkins set up The Archive of Theatre Performance (ATP) in 1989 to make archival video recordings of theatre performances. From 1991 to 1993 he was a video consultant at the Theatre Museum and from 1994 to 1995 was a video consultant at the British Library.

Jenkins formed The Meysey Players in 1996 to perform outdoor summer amateur productions of plays in the Cotswolds. Between 1997 and 2005, he produced and directed Love's Labours Lost, Twelfth Night, A Midsummer Night's Dream, Sweet Jack Falstaff (from Henry IV parts 1 and 2), The Rivals, Much Ado About Nothing, The Wind in the Willows, The Merry Wives of Windsor, and The Cherry Orchard.

In 2001 he formed Duveen Productions with Simon Langton to pursue a project on the relationship between the art connoisseur Bernard Berenson and the art dealer Joseph Duveen. In 2004 the company co-produced The Old Masters by Simon Gray (based on a treatment by Jenkins) at The Comedy Theatre, London with Edward Fox, Peter Bowles, and Barbara Jefford. The play subsequently had its US Premiere at the Long Wharf Theatre in New Haven, Connecticut in January 2011 with Sam Waterston and Brian Murray.

== Personal life and death ==
During retirement, Jenkins lived in a village in the Cotswolds with his wife Joan. The couple had two children; a son and daughter.

Jenkins died on 21 December 2022, at the age of 91.
