= The Brief =

The Brief may refer to:

- The Brief (1984 TV series), a 1984 British drama series that aired on ITV
- The Brief (2004 TV series), a 2004–2005 British drama series that aired on ITV
