= James Bree =

James Bree is the name of:

- James Bree (actor) (1923–2008), British actor
- James Bree (footballer) (born 1997), English footballer
