= Bother =

Bother may refer to:

- Bother (song), a 2003 song by Stone Sour
- Bother! The Brain of Pooh, a one-man show
- Annoyance, also known as bothering
