= Lead burning =

Welding process

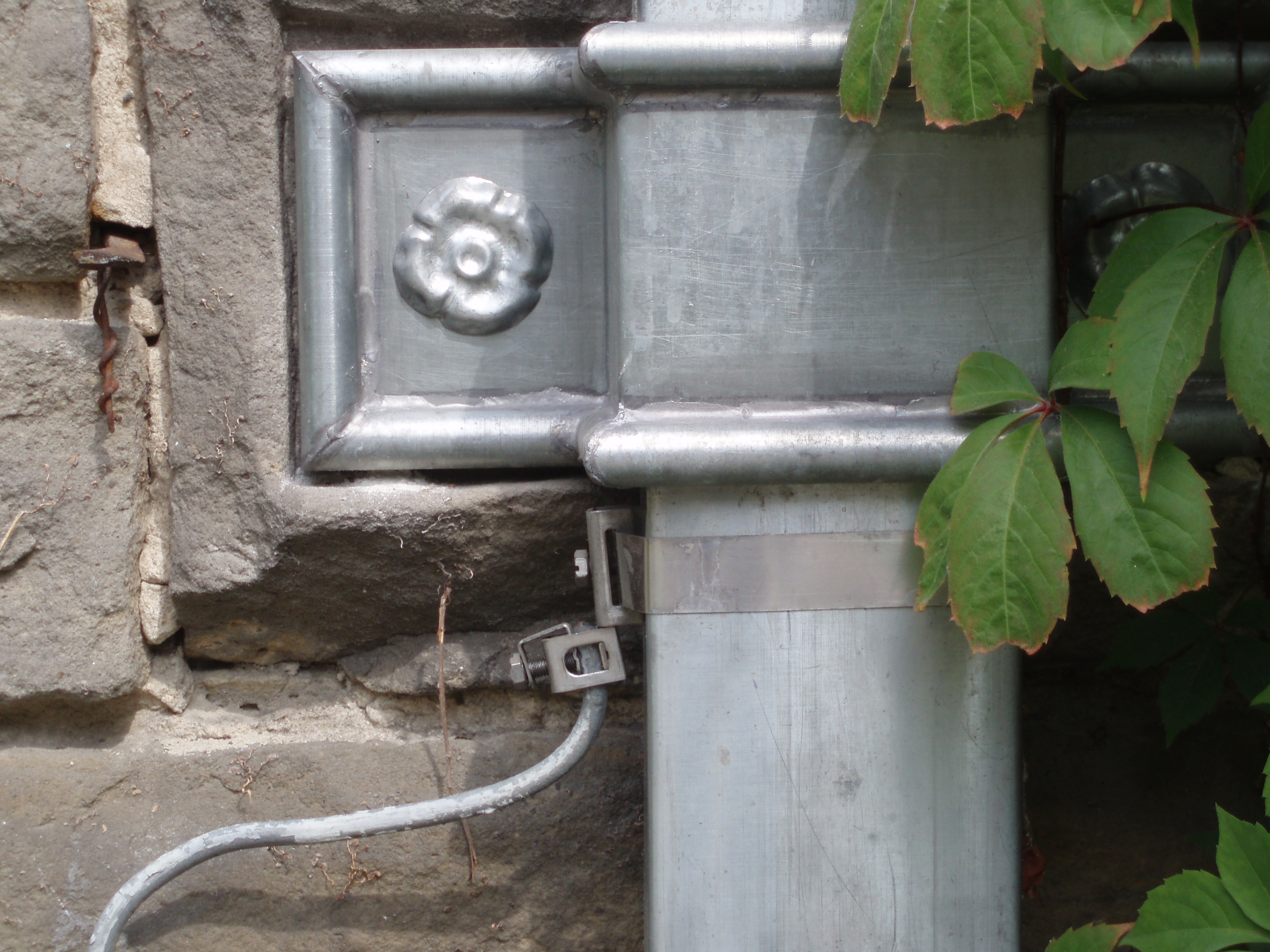
Lead rainwater goods, formed by casting and lead burning

Lead burning is a welding process used to join lead sheet. It is a manual process carried out by gas welding, usually oxy-acetylene.

== Uses ==
Lead burning is carried out for roofing work in sheet lead, or for the formation of custom-made rainwater goods: gutters, downspouts and decorative hoppers. Decorative leadworking may also use lead burning, particularly where a waterproof joint is required as for planters. Lead burning is thus part of traditional plumber's work, in its original sense of a worker in lead (Latin: plumbum). Although rare and specialised, this work is still carried out today and not just for restoration of historical buildings. Most lead sheet work is formed and sealed by bossing, a mechanical fold or crimp. This is adequate for roofing that sheds water, but is insufficiently watertight when standing water sits upon it and so an impermeable burned joint is needed.

Lead burning is not used as part of plumbing work for installed pipework. Lead piping has long been considered obsolete, owing to the health aspects. Even where lead piping, or lead-sheathed cable, still needs to be jointed, this is carried out with a wiped joint, rather than a burned joint. Wiping a lead joint is a soldering process, using plumber's solder (80% lead / 20% tin) and is carried out at low temperature, with a natural-draught propane blowtorch. Today, even wiped joints are rare and where an existing lead pipe must be connected to, a proprietary mechanical joint is more likely to be used.

In some rare cases within the chemical industry, lead burning is used for pipework, where acid-resistant tanks and pipes are required to be made of lead rather than steel. Niche uses for lead burning include the manufacture of lead plates for lead-acid batteries and for electro-plating electrodes.

== Process ==
Lead burning is an autogenous welding process. Two sheets of lead are formed mechanically to lie close against each other. They are then heated with the torch flame and flow together. No filler rod is required, the sheets form their own filler (autogenous welding). Neither is a flux used. Soldering, by contrast, uses a solder alloy that is some compatible alloy showing eutectic behaviour. This gives a melting point lower than the base metal, allowing a soldering process rather than welding. A filler rod may be needed for some welds, if there is no convenient way to form sufficient close overlap at a sheet edge. Offcuts of the same lead sheet are used as this filler. Excessive use of a filler, rather than an initial close fit, is considered a sign of poor technique.

The torch used for lead burning is a small, hot, gas flame. Oxy-acetylene is most commonly used, as it is easily portable. A small size #0 nozzle is usually used, sometimes with a miniature torch body, but the torch is otherwise the same as that used for steel or copper work. A variety of fuel gases may be used, but to achieve the high temperature needed, an oxygen supply is always used. Fuel gases may be acetylene, natural gas or hydrogen. Oxy-hydrogen is considered to be the best, but is not easily portable. Oxy-natural gas is cheapest and is often used on fixed workbenches. As it is less hot, it cannot be used for some awkward positional (overhead) welding. Oxy-acetylene is the most common, as much leadwork is carried out on site and this is easily portable.

A neutral flame is used. A reducing flame (fuel rich) gives trouble with soot deposits in the weld. An oxidising flame burns the lead and creates lead oxide dross, leading to poor welds with low malleability.

=== History ===
Lead burning requires a gas torch as autogenous processes require an intense, controllable flame that can be applied to a small area. It was first developed along with the early growth of the bulk chemical industry, as acid manufacture required leakproof lead vessels and flow process plumbing to be made. At the same time, coal gas was increasingly available for domestic lighting. By using a mouth-blown blowpipe, a gas flame could reach temperatures adequate for lead burning. Larger equipment could use mechanical fans.

Before this, leadworking used either manual bossing or wiped soldered joints to seal it.

== Safety ==
=== Fire risk ===
Lead burning, and lead soldering, are some of the few building processes which still requires the on-site use of a naked flame. This has obvious safety hazards and lead working has been implicated in some fires during restoration work on historical buildings.

=== Health ===
Metallic lead is relatively safe to work with, although lead oxide dross formed on the surface of lead is more easily absorbed by the body, thus much more of a hazard. As lead burning is a high temperature process, it creates a significant hazard from such dross. Safety precautions are relatively simple: goggles to protect the eyes from molten metal splash, overalls or dustcoat kept in the lead workshop to stop contamination spreading, and dedicated workbenches equipped with air extraction.

Regular lead burners should be screened for accumulated lead exposure. Industrially this is done by weekly checks for blue lines around the gums, a simple indicator for heavy metal poisoning, and by regular urine testing.

== See also ==
- Operation Pluto, a WWII petrol pipeline built from lead piping joined by burning
- Wiped joint, a soldering process for lead
