= Who Was Maddox? =

1964 British film by Geoffrey Nethercott

- Theatrical release poster
- Directed by: Geoffrey Nethercott
- Screenplay by: Roger Marshall
- Based on: a story by Edgar Wallace
- Produced by: Jack Greenwood
- Starring: Bernard Lee; Jack Watling; Suzanne Lloyd
- Cinematography: James Wilson
- Edited by: Derek Holding
- Production company: Merton Park Studios
- Distributed by: Anglo-Amalgamated
- Release date: 2 August 1964
- Running time: 61 minutes
- Country: United Kingdom
- Language: English

Who Was Maddox? (also known as Undisclosed Client) is a 1964 British film directed by Geoffrey Nethercott and starring Bernard Lee, Jack Watling and Suzanne Lloyd. Part of the series of Edgar Wallace Mysteries films made at Merton Park Studios, it was written by Roger Marshall based on a story by Wallace.

== Plot ==
Jack Heath is a successful director of a publishing company. After a jewel robbery at his home, he is arrested by Superintendent Meredith for the murder of the company's chairman, Alec Campbell. Meredith is not convinced of his guilt and is willing to believe that Heath is being framed. When Meredith questions Heath's wife Diane, she admits that the robbery was faked, and that she is being blackmailed by a man called Maddox. Meredith releases Jack, and pursues Maddox.

== Cast ==
- Bernard Lee as Supt. Meredith
- Jack Watling as Jack Heath
- Suzanne Lloyd as Diane Heath
- Finlay Currie as Alec Campbell
- Richard Gale as Maddox
- James Bree as Reynolds
- Dora Reisser as Anne Wilding
- Ivor Salter as Mr. White
- Christa Bergmann as Gretta
- Billy Milton as Chandler
- Lawrence Davidson as Warburton
- Dallas Cavell as Porter
- Daphne Goddard as Mrs. Lever
- Michael Stainton as Sgt. Landis

== Critical reception ==
The Monthly Film Bulletin wrote: "Following the customary penny-plain but concise style of the Edgar Wallace series, this emerges as one of the best of these films, thanks to a clever and quite gripping story which never loses its momentum. Bernard Lee has an easy, convincing manner and seems happily cast as the Superintendent, and the other members of the cast are never less than adequate."

Kine Weekly wrote: "This is a neatly made little mystery tale with a double plot that mystifies without confusing. It goes out with Carry On Spying. ... Like all the Edgar Wallace series, the product from Merton Park, this film wastes no time in getting into action, and although the plot requires rather more dialogue than usual, its intricacies are presented clearly dnd the identity of the murderer is well kept. The director shows a good feeling for character, and the acting throughout is exemplary."
