= The Capone Investment =

1974 British TV drama series

- DVD cover
- Genre: Drama Series
- Written by: Ian Kennedy Martin
- Directed by: Alan Gibson
- Starring: Glyn Owen; Peter Sallis
- Theme music composer: Alexander Faris
- Country of origin: United Kingdom
- No. of episodes: 6

Production
- Producer: James Gatward
- Running time: 30 minutes
- Production company: Southern Television

Original release
- Network: ITV
- Release: July 9 – August 13, 1974

Related
- Letters from the Dead

The Capone Investment is a 1974 British drama series directed by Alan Gibson and starring Glyn Owen, Peter Sallis, Isobel Black and John Thaw. It was written by Ian Kennedy Martin and produced by Southern Television. The plot concerns the whereabouts of Al Capone's illegal gains, garnered during the Prohibition era.

The series comprised six 30-minute episodes. It was shown by the UK free-to-air vintage film and nostalgia television channel Talking Pictures TV in June 2024.

== Synopsis ==
Chief Inspector Reaygo is assigned to investigate the murder of an American man named Milland, who was shot by a sniper. He is paired with Wheatfield, an agent of shadowy government agency DI6. They soon discover a second body, that of Milland's associate, who has been shot in identical circumstances. These two deaths are followed shortly by that of George Hunter, a local businessman.

Hunter's son Tom decides to investigate his father's murder. Tom discovers his father was spending beyond his means and was linked to local publican Duncan Hall and a mysterious American man named Anderson. While Tom questions his late father's friends and business colleagues, further deaths occur; George's butler is run down by a mystery car, his friend Abigail is electrocuted in her swimming pool and Duncan survives a sniper attack.

The butler had mentioned the Capone Investment to Reaygo before he died. Wheatfield briefs Reaygo on the Capone Investment, a large sum of money brought to Britain in the 1920s on behalf of Al Capone by an associate who died shortly after arriving. The nature and whereabouts of the investment are unknown, but it is understood to be worth millions.

Reaygo and Wheatfield discover duplicate accounts ledgers from Hunter's company and go to a London finance company, where they learn more about Capone's investment. They deduce that George Hunter had discovered the investment when he had tried to gain full control of the business that he partly owned. Hunter had arranged for payments to be directed to him instead of the shell company that received income from the investment and that Anderson was sent to Britain to eliminate Hunter when his scam was discovered. Tracing Anderson to a hotel, Reaygo and Wheatfield discover his body and the murder weapon. Newspaper used to wrap the gun has Tom Hunter's fingerprints on it.

As they travel back from London, Reaygo unravels the details of the murders; Anderson performed the first three killings then a second killer began eliminating Hunter's associates. Reaygo confronts Wheatfield with the accusation that he is the second killer and has tried to frame Tom Hunter for the murders. Wheatfield produces a gun and confesses that he has tried to locate the investment for years. He drives Reagyo to the village cricket match where the remaining associates of Hunter have gathered. At the cricket match, Wheatfield is killed by a police marksman as he tries for a second time to kill Duncan Hall.

== Cast ==
- Glyn Owen as Reaygo
- Peter Sallis as Wheatfield
- Isobel Black as Fran
- John Thaw as Tom
- Roland Curram as Bunty
- Jill Dixon as Abigail
- Richard Coleman as Duncan Hall
- John Bown as Metcalfe
- Richard Shaw as Greener
