= Cindy Shelley =

British actress

Cindy Shelley (born 23 March 1960 in Barnet, Hertfordshire) is an English actress, known for her roles in two BBC television dramas of the 1980s: Alice Courtenay in Tenko and Abby Urquhart in Howards' Way.

== Career ==
Shelley made her television debut playing Rhiannon, one of the party girls in The Young Ones episode "Interesting". A week later, she played the girl on the radio in the "Flood" episode of the same series.

Shelley played Alice Courtenay in the World War II-set series Tenko. Shelley appeared in nine episodes of series three and appeared in Tenko Reunion the following year. From 1985 to 1990, she was a regular cast member for six series of Howards' Way in the role of Abby Urquhart/Hudson.

Shelley later made appearances in The Tripods, Bottom, Men Behaving Badly, A Prince Among Men and Grange Hill.

She replaced Charlotte Long for the second series of The Tripods after Long's sudden death in a road accident.
