= Isobel Black =

British actress

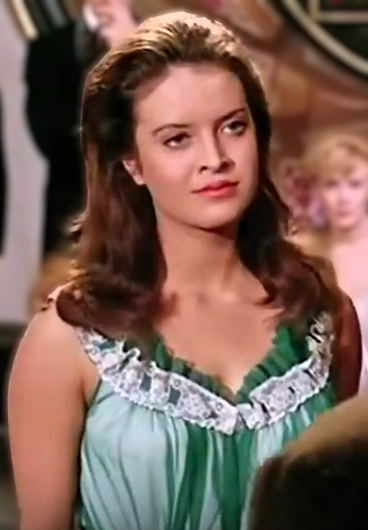
- Black in Kiss of the Vampire (1963)
- Born: Isobel Anne Black; 15 December 1942 (age 83); Edinburgh, Scotland
- Education: Queen Elizabeth's School for Girls
- Occupation: Actress
- Spouse: James Gatward
- Children: 3 daughters
- Father: Ian Stuart Black

Isobel Anne Gatward BEM (née Black; born 15 December 1942), known professionally as Isobel Black, is a British actress. She is the daughter of the screenwriter Ian Stuart Black.

Isobel Black attended Queen Elizabeth's Girls' Grammar School in Barnet, Hertfordshire. She is possibly best known for her parts in films such as Kiss of the Vampire (1963), Twins of Evil (1971) (both horror films made by Hammer), The Magnificent Two (1967) with Morecambe and Wise, David Copperfield (1969), and 10 Rillington Place (1971).

She has also made many appearances on television, including Dixon of Dock Green, Elephant Boy, Danger Man, The Plane Makers, The Avengers, Adam Adamant Lives!, The Troubleshooters, The Spies, Mystery and Imagination, Department S, Ace of Wands, The Capone Investment and The Brief.

As Isobel Gatward, she was awarded the British Empire Medal in the 2017 New Year Honours for her services to the charitable sector, in particular her work for the Mayflower Theatre Trust in Southampton over the previous 30 years.

== Filmography ==
Year	Title	Role	Notes
1963	Kiss of the Vampire	Tania	
1967	The Magnificent Two	Officer Juanita	
1971	10 Rillington Place	Alice	
1971	Twins of Evil	Ingrid Hoffer	

=== Television ===
Year	Title	Role	Notes
1959	The Invisible Man	Colette – Neighbour (uncredited)	Episode: "The White Rabbit"
1961	Sir Francis Drake	Sophia	Episode: "Boy Jack"
1962	ITV Play of the Week	Marie Louise	Episode: "My Three Angels"
1962	Emergency Ward 10	Lucy Marsden	14 episodes
1963	Man of the World	Acquilina	Episode: "Jungle Mission"
1963	BBC Sunday-Night Play	The Passenger	Episode: "Night Express"
1963	The Plane Makers	Rosalind Perry	Episode: "Any More for the Skylark?"
1963	First Night	Nadia	Episode: "It's All Lovely"
1964	Crane	Zuida	Episode: "The Secret Assassin"
1964	Witch Wood	Katrine Yester	Episode: "The Call"; Episode: "The Wood at Beltane"; Episode: "White Magic"; Episode: "The Reckoning"
1964	The Count of Monte Cristo	Eugenie Danglars	Episode: "Unlimited Credit"; Episode: "Evidence of a Crime"; Episode: "News from Janina"; Episode: "Dishonour"
1965	Dixon of Dock Green	Ann Denby	Episode: "The Avenger"
1965	Story Parade	Mary Coppard	Episode: "The Campaign"
1965	The Rise and Fall of Cesar Birotteau	Cesarine Birotteau	Episode: "Chevalier of the Legion of Honour"; Episode: "Plans for Vengeance"; Episode: "Land Near the Madeleine"; Episode: "Give Us This Day"
1965	R3	Diana	Episode: "The Big Balloon"
1965	The Avengers	Clare Prendergast	Episode: "Silent Dust"
1966	The Spies	Melina	Episode: "The Trouble with Aristotle"
1966	Danger Man	Maruja	Episode: "The Man with the Foot"
1966	The Likely Lads	Ursula	Episode: "Brief Encounter"
1966	Adam Adamant Lives!	Samantha	Episode: "The Doomsday Plan"
1966	The Scales of Justice	Bridget	Episode: "The Haunted Man"
1966	Vendetta	Leila	Episode: "The Kneeling Man"
1965–1967	No Hiding Place	Ann Bond; Pauline Digby	Episode: "Wolves Get Eaten, Too"; Episode: "A Girl Like You"
1967	This Way for Murder	Sandra	6 episodes
1968	NBC Experiment in Television	Ann	Episode: "Four Days to Omaha"
1968	Jackanory	Storyteller	Episode: "Spirit of the Mustard Pot"; Episode: "Queen of the Desert"; Episode: "Explorer in a Poke Bonnet"; Episode: "An Unusual Governess"; Episode: "The Aeroplane Girl"
1967–1968	The Troubleshooters	Eileen O'Rourke	Episode: "We're Not One of Us Perfect"; Episode: "Where the Carpet Ends"; Episode: "A Nice White Girl – Is She for Sale?"; Episode: "Mr. Know-How"; Episode: "And the Walls Came Tumbling Down"; Episode: "Thanks for Nothing"; Episode: "Rest Your Merry"; Episode: "The Deeper You Dig"; Episode: "Kitchener Knew It Well"; Episode: "Just a Bunch of Arabs in Kilts"; Episode: "A Girl to Warm Your Feet On"; Episode: "Give Me the Simple Life"; Episode: "The Slight Problem with the Press"; Episode: "The Day the Sea Caught Fire"; Episode: "The Wrecking of the Sierra Nevada"; Episode: "The Minister of the Crown... and the Very Compromising Photograph"
1968	The Revenue Men	Stella Bruce	Episode: "Little Rich Girl"
1968	Detective	Olivia Revell	Episode: "The High Adventure"
1965–1968	The Wednesday Play	Victory; Friedel Westermann; Annabel Tranter-Percy; The Girl	Episode: "The Girl Who Loves Robots"; Episode: "Calf Love"; Episode: "A Brilliant Future Behind Him"; Episode: "The Lower Largo Sequence"
1968	ITV Playhouse	Rachel Bell	Episode: "The Tycoon"
1969	ITV Saturday Night Theatre	Paula	Episode: "Steve"
1969	Department S	Maria	Episode: "The Soup of the Day"
1970	David Copperfield	Clara Copperfield	Television film
1970	Mystery and Imagination	Margaret Trelawny	Episode: "Curse of the Mummy"
1970	Redgauntlet	Greenmantle	Episode: "Warning from a Lady"; Episode: "Race Against the Tide"; Episode: "Held Prisoner"; Episode: "The Trial"; Episode: "The Storm"; Episode: "The Rebels"; Episode: "Death of a Traitor"
1970	Crime of Passion	Marthe Victor	Episode: "Pierre"
1970	Armchair Theatre	Margaret; Agnes	Episode: "A Young Man in Trouble"; Episode: "The Company Man"
1971	The Misfit	Agnes	Episode: "On Europe and Foreigners and Things"
1971	Ace of Wands	Thalia	Episode: "Nightmare Gas: Part 2"; Episode: "Nightmare Gas: Part 2"; Episode: "Nightmare Gas: Part3"
1973	Elephant	Kay Stevens	Episode: "Big Fish"; Episode: "Double Dealer"
1974	Castaway	Cathy Dunbar	Episode: "The Island"; Episode: "The Rest of the Journey"; Episode: "The Man from the Sea"; Episode: "A Handful of Gold"; Episode: "The Other Side of the Island"; Episode: "The Savage"; Episode: The Rebels"; Episode: "The Stone Men"; Episode: "Sail Ho"; Episode: "Another Paradise"; Episode: "Babes in the Wood"; Episode: "Dry Land"; Episode: "Esmeralda Log"
1974	The Capone Investment	Fran	Episode: "A Murder Missing"; Episode: "The Grass is Greener"; Episode: "The Citizen from Chicago"; Episode: "Money in the Bank"; Episode: "One Killer Makes Two"; Episode: "Final Innings"
1980	The White Bird Passes	Liza	Television film
1983	Boswell for the Defence	Janet Reid	Television film
1984	The Brief	Samantha Hellier	Episode: "People"; Episode:"Long Glyn"; Episode: "Look at Me"; Episode: "Can Kill, No One to Kill"; Episode: "Nickels and Dimes"; Episode: "Ghost"; Episode: "No Questions"; Episode: "Terry"; Episode: "And Then Where Do You Go?"; Episode: "Landscape"; Episode: "Keys"; Episode: "On the Edge"; Episode: "Airstrip One"
1984	Scotland's Story	Narrator	Episode: "North Britons?"; Episode: "Mary and an End to the French Connection"; Episode: "Disaster at Darien"; Episode: "Act of Union"; Episode: "The '45 and the Aftermath"; Episode: "The Improvers"; Episode: "The Clearances"; Episode: "The Age of Victoria"; Episode: "A Generation Lost"; Episode: "Lean Years"; Episode: "Yet Still the Blood Is Strong"
1990	The Castle of Adventure	Aunt Jane	8 episodes
1990	Tygo Road	Kate	5 episodes
