= Edward Highmore =

British retired actor (born 1961)

- Born: Edward Thomas Highmore; 3 April 1961 (age 65); Kingston upon Thames, England
- Education: Guildford School of Acting
- Occupation: Actor
- Years active: 1984–2002 (Note: His last acting credit is from 2002, but he coached his son, Freddie, for the 2006 film Arthur and the Minimoys and was credited as additional crew.)
- Spouse: Sue Latimer
- Children: 2, including Freddie Highmore

Edward Thomas Highmore (born 3 April 1961) is an English former actor from Kingston upon Thames, London.

== Life and career ==
Best known for playing Leo Howard in the 1980s BBC drama Howards' Way. He also appeared in Doctor Who, playing Malkon in the 1984 serial Planet of Fire. Highmore attended Guildford School of Acting.

He is the father of actor Freddie Highmore, who played Charlie Bucket in the 2005 film version of Charlie and the Chocolate Factory, and Bertie. Edward and Freddie starred together in Jack and the Beanstalk: The Real Story as father and son. Edward's wife, Sue Latimer, is a talent agent whose clients include Daniel Radcliffe.

== Filmography ==
Year	Title	Role	Notes
1984	Doctor Who	Malkon	Episode: Planet of Fire
1984–1985	Lame Ducks	Freddie	4 episodes
1985	The Tripods	Boll	5 episodes
1985–1990	Howards' Way	Leo Howard	TV
1993	Heidi	Herr Kandidat	Miniseries
1994	Willie's War	Dad	
1994	Love Hurts	Dr. Wood	Episode: Cards on the Table
1994	Doomsday Gun	Claude	TV movie
1995	The Politician's Wife	Club Waiter	3 episodes
1995	Annie: A Royal Adventure!	Hotel Clerk	TV movie
1996	The Detectives	Doctor	Episode: Sacked
1996	Jack and Jeremy's Real Lives	Chef	Episode: Restaurateurs
1997	No Child of Mine	Ray	TV movie
1997	See You Friday	Keith	1 episode
1998	Mosley	Derek Johnson	TV Serial
1998	Elizabeth	Lord Harewood	
1999	The Blonde Bombshell	Reporter	Miniseries
2000	The 10th Kingdom	Queen's Servant	Miniseries
2001	Jack and the Beanstalk: The Real Story	Dad at Playground	Miniseries
2002	Ali G Indahouse	Cabinet MP	
