= Suzanne Lloyd =

Canadian actress (born 1932 or 1933)

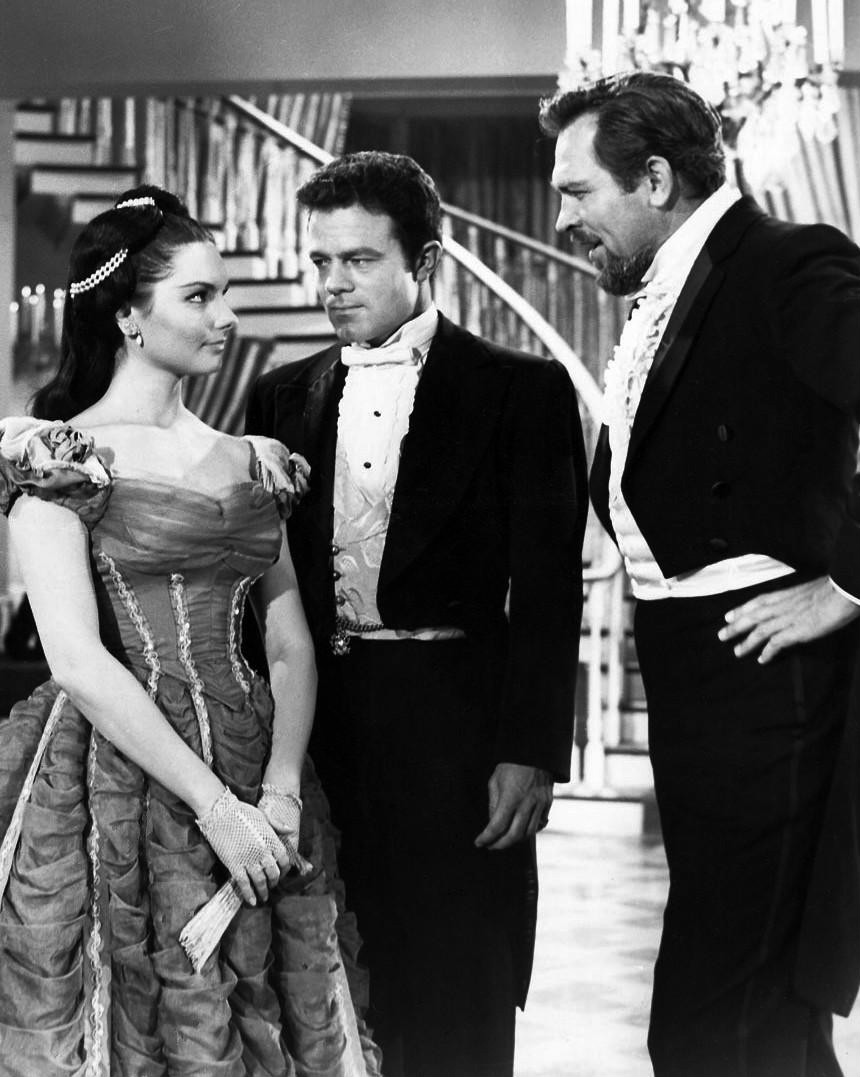
- Lloyd, Jack Ging, and Howard Keel in Tales of Wells Fargo, 1961
- Born: 1932 or 1933 (age 92–93); Toronto, Canada
- Years active: 1958-2017
- Children: Tracey E. Bregman

Suzanne Lloyd (born 1932 or 1933) is a Canadian former film and television actress.

== Early years and career ==
Lloyd was born in Toronto, Canada, and grew up in Pasadena, California. She attended Humbercrest School, Bishop Strachan School, and Pasadena Junior College. Before she became an actress, she worked in sales and as a model. A photograph of her was used on the cover of Pageant magazine.

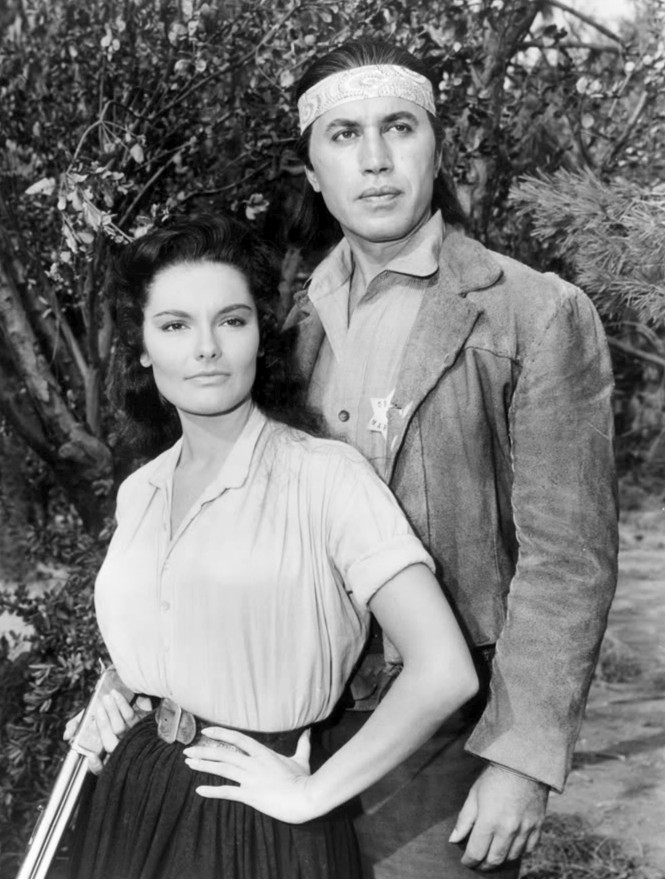
Michael Ansara and Lloyd in Law of the Plainsman (1962)

Lloyd's performances in productions at the Glendale Center Theatre led to her being tested for work on TV. She had a recurring role as Raquel Toledano in the classic Zorro television series. She was a frequent guest star on both British and American television, including Gunsmoke (1959–1961), One Step Beyond, Bourbon Street Beat, The Islanders, Rescue 8, Buckskin, The Texan, Laramie, Lawman, Colt .45, Tales of Wells Fargo, Bonanza, The Avengers, Thriller, The Twilight Zone, Bat Masterson, Perry Mason, Walt Disney's Wonderful World of Color, Mike Hammer, Have Gun – Will Travel, Maverick, The Tab Hunter Show, and six episodes of The Saint.

Despite retiring from acting in 1974, she appeared in an episode of The Young and the Restless in 2017, co-starring with her daughter Tracey E. Bregman.

== Partial filmography ==
Year	Title	Role	Notes
1958-1961	Zorro	Raquel Toledano/Isabella Linares	7 episodes
1959	Rescue 8	Marge Morgan	Episode: "Danger in Paradise"
1959	Gunsmoke	Nayomi	Episode: "Target"
1959	The Twilight Zone	Maya/Miss Thomas	Episode: "Perchance to Dream"
1960	Seven Ways from Sundown	Lucinda	
1960	Overland Trail	Anne Cambers	
1960	Pepe	Carmen	
1960	Have Gun, Will Travel	Chita	Episode: "Black Sheep"
1960	Law of the Plainsman	Bertha Ellis	Episode 28 series 1 Jebs Daughter
1960	Bat Masterson	Linda	"Three bullets for Bat"
1961	The Tab Hunter Show	Hilary Hill	Episode: "The Movie Set" (alternate title: "A Star Is Born")
1961	Bonanza	Jennifer Lane	Episode: "The Bride"
1961	Perry Mason	Sheila Benton	Episode: "The Case of the Difficult Detour"
1961	Gunsmoke	Harriet	Episode: "Harriet"
1961	Maverick	Laura Nelson	Episode: "Last Stop: Oblivion"
1964	Who Was Maddox?	Diane Heath	
1964	The Saint	Various roles	6 episodes
1965	The Return of Mr. Moto	Maxine Powell	
1965	The Avengers	Barbara Wakefield	Episode: "The Murder Market"
1966	That Riviera Touch	Claudette	
1966	The Saint	Various	6 episodes
1967	The Champagne Murders	Evelyn	
2017	The Young and the Restless	Restaurant Patron	Episode: #1.11293
