= Sian Webber =

British actress (born 1959)

- Born: 1959 (age 66–67); England, United Kingdom
- Occupation: Actress
- Years active: 1984–present
- Notable credit(s): Howards' Way (1987–1989); EastEnders (2005–2012, 2014–2016, 2018–2020, 2022–)

Sîan Webber (born 1959) is a British actress. She is known the recurring role of Ritchie Scott in BBC soap opera EastEnders, which she first played in 2005, returning regularly to the role up to and including 2026.

== Career ==
Webber has appeared in Pie in the Sky ( Episode: A Shot In The Dark - 1994), Howards' Way (1987–89), Star Cops (a 1987 episode), The Bill (six episodes, 1993–2006), Highlander: The Series (two-part 1995 episode), Dangerfield (two-part 1995 episode), Bad Girls (two 2000 episodes), Peak Practice (a 2002 episode), Holby City (four episodes, 2004–2018), EastEnders (ongoing recurring role, with breaks, since 2005), Casualty (six episodes, 2006–2020), Waterloo Road (a 2006 episode), Midsomer Murders (a 2016 episode), Gunpowder (a 2017 episode), and the 2021 film Venom: Let There Be Carnage.
