= Ivor Danvers =

English actor (1932–2020)

Ivor Colin Danvers (14 July 1932 – 13 March 2020) was an English actor, best known for his role as Gerald Urquhart in the 1980s BBC drama Howards' Way. He was born in Westcliff-on-Sea, Essex.

Other TV credits include: Z-Cars, Softly, Softly, The Troubleshooters, Juliet Bravo, Tenko, Minder, Terry and June and Keeping Up Appearances. In 2003, he guest starred in the Doctor Who audio drama Nekromanteia.

Danvers died in March 2020 at the age of 87.
