= Wipe =

Wipe or wiping may refer to:

== Hygiene ==
- Toilet paper or wet wipes, or their use

== Arts and media ==
- Wipe (transition), a gradual transition in film editing
- Wipe curtain, a kind of theater curtain
- Wipe or Screenwipe, a television series by Charlie Brooker
- Wiping (video game), a 1982 video game

== Technology ==
- Wiping (magnetic tape), a process in which old television and radio recordings were overwritten, erased, or destroyed
- Data erasure, purging a computer file to counter data remanence
- Degaussing of ships' hulls to guard against magnetic naval mines

== Other uses ==
- Wuhan Institute of Physical Education (WIPE), a university in China

== See also ==
- Wiped joint, a form of soldered joint used to join lead pipework
