= Bother! The Brain of Pooh =

Bother! The Brain of Pooh is a one-man show created and performed by the English actor Peter Dennis with selections from the works about Winnie-the-Pooh by A. A. Milne. It premiered on October 14, 1976 at the ADC Theatre, Cambridge University, and premiered in America at the Lee Strasberg Theatre Institute in December 1986. The show received eight Critics' Choice Awards, the LA Weekly Theater Award, and the Drama-Logue Award. Bother! has been performed at over eighty major venues throughout the United Kingdom and the United States of America.

The performance of Peter Dennis was acclaimed by Milne's son, Christopher Robin Milne, who said "Peter Dennis has made himself Pooh's Ambassador Extraordinary and no bear has ever had a more devoted friend. So if you want to meet the real Pooh, the bear I knew, the bear my father wrote about, listen to Peter. You will not be disappointed."

Dennis died in April, 2009. Recordings of his reading the Pooh stories and poems are available.
