= Glyn Owen =

English actor (1928–2004)

- Born: Griffith Owen; 6 March 1928; Bolton, Lancashire, England, U,K.
- Died: 10 September 2004 (aged 76); Gwynedd, Wales, U.K,
- Occupation: Actor
- Years active: 1956–2000
- Spouses: Patricia Mort (m. 1965; died 1999) Carrie Clifton (m. 2001)
- Children: 2, including Lloyd Owen

Glyn Griffith Owen (6 March 1928 – 10 September 2004) was an Anglo-Welsh film, stage and television actor, known to British television viewers for three roles: that of Dr Patrick O'Meara in Emergency Ward 10 (ITV, 1957–61), Edward Hammond in The Brothers (BBC, 1972), and Jack Rolfe in Howards' Way (BBC, 1985–90).

== Biography ==
Born in Bolton, Lancashire, the son of a Welsh railway guard (and an English mother, making him Anglo-Welsh), Glyn Owen left school aged 14 and worked in a telegraph office. He completed his national service in 1946–48 during which time he acted in the War Office's amateur dramatic company. For the next five years he was a police officer in London's Paddington district, and as a traffic officer he unofficially escorted actor and director Richard Attenborough under blue lights to a BBC recording. He continued in amateur dramatics and received acting training at the Actors' Studio in St John's Wood. where agent, Lew Grade signed him as a client.

By 1955, Owen was performing with the George Mitchell Singers in Blackpool, with the impresario Lew Grade as his agent. His television debut was in 1956 in The Trollenberg Terror. His other television roles include Coronation Street, The Brothers, Doomwatch, The Adventures of William Tell, The Rat Catchers, Doctor Who, All Creatures Great and Small, Take the High Road, The Capone Investment, Ennal's Point, Oil Strike North, Survivors, and Blake's 7. In "Colony Three", a 1964 episode of Danger Man, he played Randall, John Drake's assigned roommate at a Soviet spy‐training facility. He appeared in a 1978 episode of The Professionals, "Rogue", in which he played a corrupt CI5 agent.

His short career as a policeman stood him in good stead to play the role of Wally, an alcoholic ex-policeman, in an episode of the fourth series of The Sweeney called "Money, Money, Money". In 2003, he appeared with his former Howards' Way co-star Ivor Danvers in the Doctor Who tie-in audio play Nekromanteia. He appeared in Man at the Top in 1972 in the episode "How to Make a Fortune".

Owen's film appearances include feature roles in Inn for Trouble (1960), Attack on the Iron Coast (1968), One More Time (1970), the crime thriller The Capone Investment (1974) and the 1975 Children's Film Foundation movie The Firefighters.

He appeared regularly on the West End stage and in fringe theatre. He also appeared at Edinburgh with Tom Courtenay in Hamlet, and made numerous appearances at Hampstead between the late 1960s and the 1980s. He appeared in musicals and pantomime, including The Four Musketeers with Harry Secombe at Drury Lane, Dick Whittington with Ken Dodd at the Palace Theatre, Manchester, and Roll on Four O'Clock for Colin Welland at Wythenshawe (which transferred to the Palace, Shaftesbury Avenue).

Owen toured North America with the Royal Shakespeare Company, finishing at the Palace Theatre in New York City, in London Assurance. He joined the National Theatre Company to appear as the father in Equus; and won an award for his portrayal of the father in Spring and Port Wine for Middle Ground Theatre Company.

== Personal life ==
Owen was married twice. His first marriage, in 1965 and later dissolved, was to the actress Patricia Mort (1933–1999), with whom he had two children, both actors Lloyd Owen (born 1966) and Cathy Owen (born 1968). His second marriage was to former dancer Carrie Clifton in 2001.

== Filmography ==
Year	Title	Role	Notes
1957	The Assassin	Dr. Michael Clayton	
1957	A Santa for Christmas	Unknown	
1959	Life in Emergency Ward 10	Paddy O'Meara	
1960	Inn for Trouble	Lord Osbourne	
1968	Attack on the Iron Coast	Forrester	
1970	One More Time	Dennis	
1975	The Firefighters	Mr. Grant	
2000	Pandaemonium	Fisherman	(final film role)
