= Howards' Way =

British TV drama series (1985–1990)

- Main title caption (from series 2 to series 6)
- Genre: Drama
- Created by: Gerard Glaister; Allan Prior
- Starring: Maurice Colbourne; Jan Harvey; Glyn Owen; Dulcie Gray; Stephen Yardley; Tony Anholt; Susan Gilmore; Tracey Childs; Edward Highmore; Cindy Shelley; Ivor Danvers; Patricia Shakesby; Sarah-Jane Varley; Nigel Davenport; Lana Morris; Sian Webber; Kate O'Mara; Jeff Harding
- Theme music composer: Simon May
- Country of origin: United Kingdom
- Original language: English
- No. of series: 6
- No. of episodes: 78

Production
- Producer: Gerard Glaister
- Running time: 50 minutes
- Production company: BBC Birmingham (Pebble Mill Studios)

Original release
- Network: BBC1
- Release: 1 September 1985 – 25 November 1990

Related
- Trainer

Howards' Way is a television drama series produced by BBC Birmingham and transmitted on BBC1 between 1 September 1985 and 25 November 1990. The series deals with the personal and professional lives of the wealthy yachting and business communities in the fictional town of Tarrant on the south coast of England, and was filmed on the River Hamble and the Solent.

The series was notable for its pioneering camerawork on board yachts, often filming multiple yachts racing in choppy waters and high winds, and its extensive location shooting mainly on the south coast of Britain. Most of the location filming for the series was carried out in Bursledon, Hamble, Swanwick, Warsash, Hill Head, Lee-on-the-Solent, Lymington, Hythe, Southampton and Fareham—all in Hampshire. The Jolly Sailor pub in Bursledon featured in several episodes.

All interiors were filmed in Studio A at the BBC Pebble Mill studios in Edgbaston, Birmingham. Extensive two-storey sets were constructed inside the studio (the Howards and the Urquhart homes were both functioning two-floor sets). The smaller Studio B (used for regional news) was also occasionally used as an on-screen fashion photography studio. Other areas of the large 1970s TV and radio complex (opened in 1971) were used for the many board room scenes in the series, with long corridors and lifts sometimes doubling as a busy hospital and meeting rooms became lavish corporate hospitality suites.

== History ==
Howards' Way was created and produced by Gerard Glaister and Allan Prior, with lead writer Raymond Thompson as story and script consultant—at a point in the BBC's history when the organisation was making a concerted populist strike against ITV in its approach to programming. The series debuted on BBC1 in 1985, the same year that the BBC launched its first ongoing soap opera EastEnders as a challenge to the ratings supremacy of ITV's Coronation Street. Although Howards' Way is commonly cited as an attempt to provide a British alternative to glossy American sagas such as Dallas and Dynasty, it also acts as a continuation of plot themes explored in a previous Glaister series, The Brothers, which involved a family's personal and professional crises running a road haulage firm, and embraced several soap opera touches in its characterisations and storylines.

The original working title for the series was "The Boatbuilders", which was ultimately rejected when it was felt that it sounded like a documentary series and wouldn't grab viewers' attention.

The theme music was composed by Simon May and performed by his orchestra. Executive Leslie Osborne secured a co-writer credit, but in reality did not contribute to the composition. After series one, Don Black was commissioned to write lyrics for the theme; May had suggested the title "Almost There", which Black changed to "Always There". The song was recorded by Marti Webb, and reached number 13 in the UK singles chart. The upbeat variation of the theme, "Barracuda", was used over the show's end credits from series 3 until the show ended, and was a "re-visitation" of a section of May's song "Believe" for his musical Smike.

Inspired by a storyline in Howards' Way, Gerard Glaister went on to create Trainer (1991–1992), set in the world of horse-racing, and also featuring several of the same cast members.

== Plot ==
The protagonists in the early episodes are the titular Howard family—Tom (Maurice Colbourne), wife Jan (Jan Harvey) and grown-up children Leo (Edward Highmore) and Lynne (Tracey Childs). Tom is made redundant from his job as an aircraft designer after twenty years and is unwilling to re-enter the rat race. A sailing enthusiast, he decides to pursue his dream of designing and building boats, putting his redundancy pay-out into the ailing Mermaid boatyard, run by Jack Rolfe (Glyn Owen), a gruff traditionalist, and his daughter Avril (Susan Gilmore). Tom immediately finds himself in conflict with Jack, whose reliance on alcohol and whose resentment of Tom's new design ideas threaten the business, but has an ally in Avril, who turns out to be the real driving force behind the yard with her cool, businesslike brain. Jan, who has spent the last twenty years raising the children and building the family home, is less than impressed by her husband's risky new venture, and finds herself pursuing her own life outside the family through establishing a new marina boutique whilst working for Ken Masters (Stephen Yardley).

Other major characters introduced during the first series are Kate Harvey (Dulcie Gray), Jan's sensible and supportive mother, the millionaire businessman Charles Frere (Tony Anholt) and the wealthy but unhappy Urquhart family. Gerald (Ivor Danvers) is the right-hand man of Charles Frere. Polly (Patricia Shakesby), a friend of Jan, is a bored corporate wife preoccupied with preserving her social status, and their daughter Abby (Cindy Shelley) is a socially awkward young woman who has returned to Tarrant after completing her education at a Swiss finishing school and who establishes a friendship with Leo Howard. Unlike the comparatively close and secure Howard family, the Urquharts have secrets to hide. Gerald and Polly's marriage is a sham—an arrangement to cover the fact that Gerald is bisexual, to give him respectability in the business world and give a name to Abby, Polly's illegitimate daughter after an affair at university. Abby herself is pregnant, after a brief relationship in Switzerland.

The series combined standard melodramatic storylines involving family drama, romance and extramarital affairs (Tom and Avril, Jan and Ken) with business-related plots of corporate intrigue and scheming for power, climaxing with an end-of-series cliffhanger.

== Reception ==
Howards' Way proved to be a hugely popular programme for the BBC, both domestically and in overseas sales. While the series was unable to compete with the likes of Dallas and Dynasty in terms of opulence, its stylistic aspects did develop as it went on, with the staging of powerboat races and fashion shows, and extensive location filming in Guernsey, Malta and Gibraltar as the storylines dictated.

A number of new characters were also introduced later in the series, such as Sarah Foster (Sarah-Jane Varley), a glamorous business partner for Ken Masters, Sir Edward Frere (Nigel Davenport), the rich tycoon father of Charles Frere, Orrin Hudson (Jeff Harding), the American father of Abby Urquhart's baby, Emma Neesome (Sian Webber), a beautiful engineer who came to work with Tom Howard and Jack Rolfe at the Mermaid yard, and Vanessa Andenberg (Lana Morris), an elegant widow and old flame of Jack Rolfe. Towards the end of the second series, Charles is revealed to be Abby's biological father. In a parallel with Dynasty, actress Kate O'Mara, who had previously starred in The Brothers and had also appeared in the American supersoap as Caress Morrell, was also brought in, to play ruthless businesswoman Laura Wilde.

During the production of the fifth series, lead actor Maurice Colbourne, who played central character Tom Howard, suddenly died from a heart attack during a break in filming. Episode nine featured his last appearance with the remaining episodes hurriedly rewritten to explain the character's absence. He was finally killed off at the beginning of the sixth and final series, commissioned to end the programme and to tie up all the storylines. The final episode of Howards' Way was transmitted on 25 November 1990.

== Boats ==
Central to the plot were three yachts - The Flying Fish, a Laser 28; Barracuda of Tarrant, the prototype of the Sadler Barracuda 45, and Spring of Tarrant, the prototype of the MG Spring 25. Both the Barracuda and Spring were designed by Tony Castro.

== Main cast list ==
Character	Actor	Series					
Character	Actor	Series 1	Series 2	Series 3	Series 4	Series 5	Series 6
Tom Howard	Maurice Colbourne						
Jan Howard	Jan Harvey						
Ken Masters	Stephen Yardley						
Jack Rolfe	Glyn Owen						
Charles Frere	Tony Anholt						
Avril Rolfe	Susan Gilmore						
Kate Harvey	Dulcie Gray						
Leo Howard	Edward Highmore						
Lynne Howard	Tracey Childs						
Abby Urquhart	Cindy Shelley						
Gerald Urquhart	Ivor Danvers						
Polly Urquhart	Patricia Shakesby						
Bill Sayers	Robert Vahey						
Sir John Stevens	Willoughby Gray						
Claude Dupont	Malcolm Jamieson						
Dawn Williams	Sally Farmiloe						
Davy Malik	Kulvinder Ghir						
Phil Norton	Anthony Head						
Richard Shellet	Oscar Quitak						
David Lloyd	Bruce Bould						
Sarah Foster	Sarah-Jane Varley						
Mark Foster	Graham Pountney						
Orrin Hudson	Ryan Michael / Jeff Harding						
Curtis Jaeger	Dean Harris						
Viscount Cunningham	Richard Wilson						
Sir Edward Frere	Nigel Davenport						
Emma Neesome	Sian Webber						
Vanessa Andenberg	Lana Morris						
Admiral Francis Redfern	Michael Denison						
Amanda Parker	Francesca Gonshaw						
Mr. Lee	Burt Kwouk						
Anna Lee	Sarah Lam						
Mike Hanley	Michael Loney						
Richard Spencer	John Moulder-Brown						
Scott Benson	Paul Maxwell						
Laura Wilde	Kate O'Mara						
James Brooke	Andrew Bicknell						
Vicki Rockwell	Victoria Burgoyne						
Yvette Studer	Catherine Schell						
Robert Hastings	Paul Jerricho						
Jenny Richards	Charmian Gradwell						
David Relton	Richard Heffer						
Tony Munroe	John Rhean						
Pierre Challon	James Coombes						

== Series overview ==
Series	Episodes	Originally aired	
Series	Episodes	First aired	Last aired
Series 1	13	1 September 1985	24 November 1985
Series 2	13	31 August 1986	23 November 1986
Series 3	13	6 September 1987	29 November 1987
Series 4	13	4 September 1988	27 November 1988
Series 5	13	3 September 1989	26 November 1989
Series 6	13	2 September 1990	25 November 1990

== DVD releases ==
DVD Series	Episodes	Region 2 Release Date	Region 4 Release Date	Comments
Complete Series 1	13	20 March 2006	6 October 2008	4 disc set included three commentaries on Episodes 1, 12 and 13 with Jan Harvey (Jan Howard), Stephen Yardley (Ken Masters) and Howards' Way fan Tim Teeman.
Complete Series 2	13	19 June 2006	16 February 2009	4 disc set included three commentaries on Episodes 1, 12 and 13 again with Jan Harvey (Jan Howard), Stephen Yardley (Ken Masters) and Howards' Way fan Tim Teeman.
Complete Series 3	13	11 September 2006	18 May 2009	4 disc set with no special features.
Complete Series 4	13	11 February 2008	13 July 2009	4 disc set with no special features.
Complete Series 5	13	19 May 2008	16 November 2009	4 disc set with no special features.
Complete Series 6	13	18 August 2008	8 February 2010	4 disc set with no special features.
The Complete Series Boxset	78	2 November 2009		24 disc boxset including all 6 series and all 78 episodes.

The show is rated PG for Parental Guidance in Australia and PG in New Zealand for violence and coarse language.

== In other media ==
A medley of the theme songs from Howards' Way and EastEnders was recorded by the Shadows and reached No. 86 on the UK singles chart in December 1986.
