= David Weir (writer) =

British television scriptwriter (1934–2011)

- Born: 11 February 1934
- Died: 25 June 2011 (aged 77)
- Education: Royal Academy of Dramatic Art
- Occupations: TV and film writer
- Writing career
- Notable works: The Plane Makers, The Troubleshooters, The Lotus Eaters, Crown Court, Danger Man, A Family at War, Space: 1999, The Onedin Line, The Water Margin, Monkey

David Weir (11 February 1934 – 25 June 2011) was a British writer, whose work was used primarily in television and film.

== Early life and career ==
Born on 11 February 1934, Weir attended the Royal Academy of Dramatic Art in the 1950s, and began writing scripts for television in the 1960s and 1970s, including The Plane Makers (1963–64) and The Troubleshooters, (1966–69; known in the US as Mogul), as well as The Lotus Eaters (1972). Weir also wrote occasional scripts for many other British TV series, such as Danger Man (US: Secret Agent, 1964), A Family at War (1970–72), The Onedin Line (1971–80), Crown Court (1972–84), and Space: 1999 (1975–78).

== The Water Margin and Monkey ==
Weir's scriptwriting credits include English-language adaptations of The Water Margin (1976–78, based on the Chinese story Water Margin) and Monkey (1978–80, based on Journey to the West). These two series were produced in Japan using local actors and crew and dubbed into English using British voice over artists. The original English scripts were conceived and written by Weir without the aid of translations, using only brief plot synopses. Weir later wrote a novelisation of The Water Margin, based on the BBC TV series.

Weir was interviewed for the BBC magazine Radio Times from 10 to 17 November 1979, to coincide with the start of the second series of Monkey. During the interview, he expressed an interest in Buddhism and Eastern culture and religion, which would remain with him for the rest of his life.

== Doctor Who ==
Weir wrote the scripts for a six episode serial of the BBC science-fiction TV series Doctor Who that were considered too expensive for the original series and were never made, although they were originally due to form part of the fifteenth season, starring Tom Baker as the Fourth Doctor, in 1978. The serial, Killers of the Dark, would have introduced a race of cat people found to be living on Gallifrey, the homeworld of the Time Lords.

== Later life ==
Weir retired and lived a reclusive life in rural Norfolk and then West Yorkshire. He died from lung cancer on 25 June 2011.
