= John Lucarotti =

British screenwriter and novelist (1926–1994)

- John Lucarotti at Panopticon 1993
- Born: John Vincent Lucarotti; 20 May 1926; Aldershot, Hampshire, England, UK
- Died: 20 November 1994 (aged 68); Paris, France
- Occupation: Screenwriter
- Known for: The Avengers; Doctor Who; The Troubleshooters

John Vincent Lucarotti (20 May 1926 – 20 November 1994) was a British-Canadian screenwriter and author who worked on The Avengers, The Troubleshooters and Doctor Who in the 1960s.

== Early life ==
Born into an Army family in Aldershot in Hampshire in 1926 the son of Helen (née Stark) and Umberto Rimes Lucarotti, John Lucarotti inherited his Italian surname from his grandfather, who was a sculptor. Lucarotti spent 10 years in the Royal Navy during and after the Second World War before moving to Canada in 1950 to pursue his interest in writing.

== Career ==
A naturalized Canadian citizen, he began his career at the Canadian Broadcasting Corporation, writing on over 200 various scripts for them as well as for Canadian television.

In 1956–7, he wrote scripts for the Canadian television series Radisson and also wrote the lyrics to the theme song. He then worked for a period selling encyclopedias door-to-door until troubled by his conscience for selling things to people they didn't really want or need. He moved back to England where he had a prolific career. He created the television series Operation Patch (later novelised), The Ravelled Thread, and The Panther's Leap. He wrote six episodes for The Avengers (one episode however was a rewrite of a script by Gerald Verner), thirty-two episodes for The Troubleshooters and contributed fifteen episodes to the BBC's Doctor Who in the 1960s, the three serials: Marco Polo, The Aztecs and The Massacre of St Bartholomew's Eve.

He subsequently novelised his Doctor Who scripts for Target Books. He contributed a script for what ultimately became the 1975 serial The Ark in Space, but it was rewritten by script editor Robert Holmes and Lucarotti received no on-screen credit.

== Personal life ==
In 1950 he married Lorna D Blaney in Gosport in Hampshire but the marriage was later dissolved. He later married Rose-marie Sandy in London in 1969.

== Death ==
Lucarotti died of spinal cancer in Paris on 20 November 1994 at age 68.
