= Wiped joint =

Form of soldered joint used

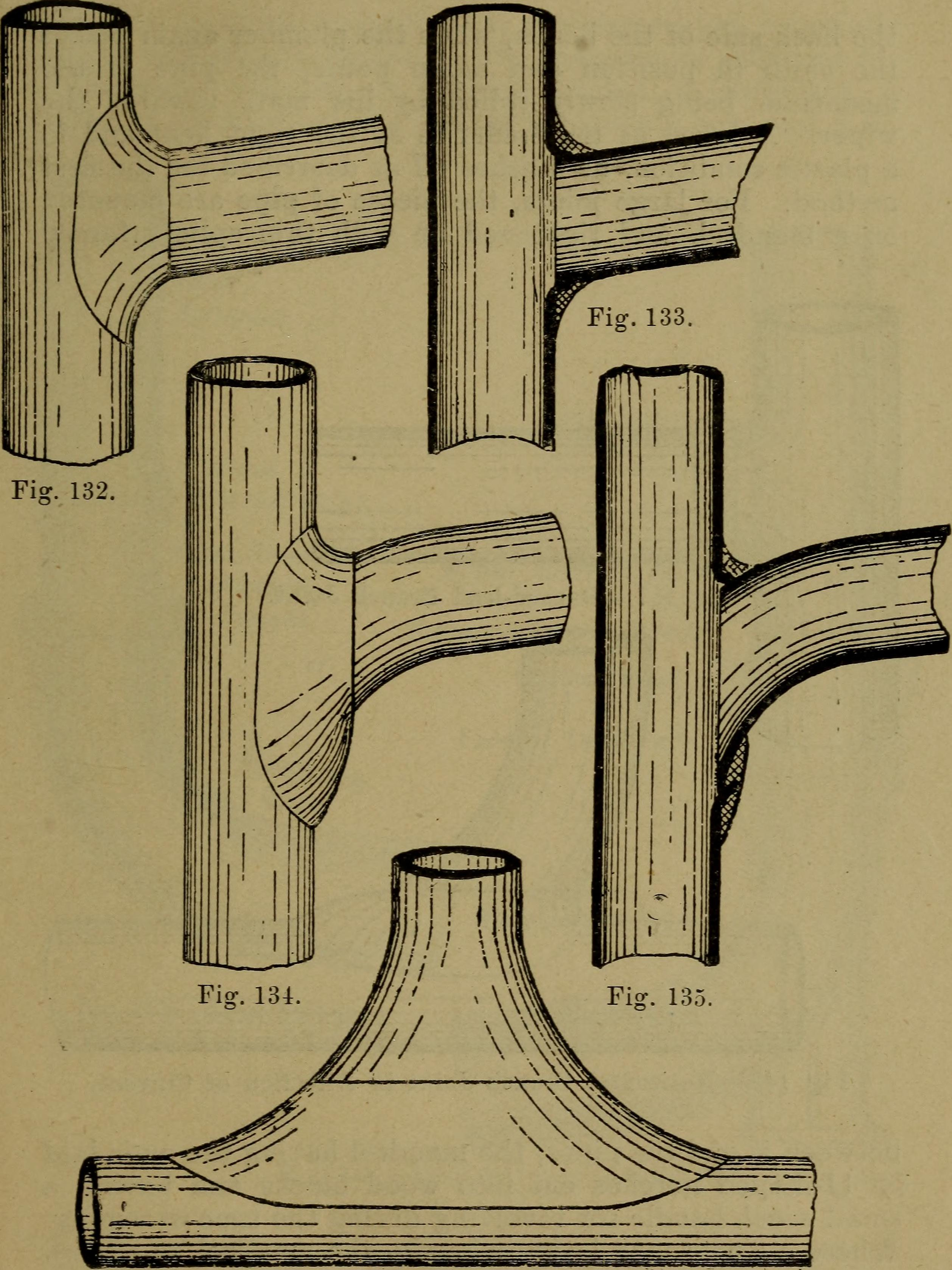
Typical wiped joints, to form junctions in lead pipe

A wiped joint is a form of soldered joint used to join lead pipework.

== Process ==
The defining characteristic of a wiped joint is that the soldering process involves mechanically working or 'wiping' the joint. As well as heating solder and applying it to the joint, the solder is shaped into place manually, wiping it with a non-metallic tool to form a smooth-surfaced outer shape. This relies on the use of a lead-tin solder with a wide eutectic range. This is an alloy composition that when heated and melted has a large range where it is neither fully solid nor fully liquid, but is an equilibrium mixture of both solid and liquid simultaneously. The resultant 'pasty' texture and mechanical fluidity allows the joint to be wiped to shape.

The solder grade used for leadworking is plumber's solder (80% lead / 20% tin). (Note: Modern plumbers rarely use 'plumber's solder' as they rarely work lead. Modern copper plumbing was soldered with something closer to 50% / 50%, or now a lead-free solder.) Although this is thought of as a high melting point solder amongst lead-tin solders, the solidus is relatively constant for all of these solders and it is the liquidus which climbs from the eutectic point at Sn 63% / Pb 37%.

=== Technique ===
For pipework, the two parts are first formed to shape so as to fit closely. As lead is a ductile metal, this was easily done by hand using a variety of mallets and shaped sticks. Wooden cones could also be used to stretch the diameter of one pipe so that another of nominally the same size could now fit within it. The metal was then cleaned by scraping off the surface, then protecting it with a flux of tallow. (Note: Tallow is not an 'active' flux, using acids or resins, as used for soldering copper. It provides a barrier to further oxidation on clean metal, but will not clean metal chemically. Thus the mechanical scraping step is needed for lead work.)

Areas that should not receive any lead were painted with plumbers soil which was a mixture of lampblack and glue; or flour, salt, sugar and water. The lead would not stick to it, and the plumbers soil would be washed off later.

Heat was applied with a blowtorch and when the joint was hot, the end of a bar of solder was applied and melted onto the joint.

The molten solder gives a 'pasty' behaviour, owing to its eutectic properties and can be worked for some time before it hardens. Shaping was done with either a 'moleskin', (Note: Moleskin cloth has a napped appearance that resembles a mole. The skin of moles themselves is fur, and will burn at soldering temperatures. Moles have never been used for soldering.) a heat-resistant pad of cotton cloth, covered with tallow, or else a wooden stick, also greased with tallow.

== Applications ==
=== Plumbing ===
Wiped joints were used for centuries to install water plumbing and similar joints can be seen in Roman plumbing. As the wiping technique allowed a great deal of on-site flexibility for the style and dimensions of the work produced, this meant that plumbers needed few parts other than pipe, lead sheet and solder. Large and complex joints could all be made by the artisan's skill alone. With the development of copper plumbing, (Note: To avoid the toxic effects of lead in drinking water) many different types and sizes of factory-made plumbing fitting were needed, which would be assembled on site rather than fabricated from raw materials.

In the later years of lead plumbing, (Note: The immediate post-WWII years) it was recognised that the health effects of lead piping were a problem for drinking water, especially in soft water areas. Tin-lined lead pipes were used, soldered over a thin brass joint liner. These needed care when wiping the joint, in order to not overheat them and melt the tin layer.

Copper to lead joints may be made by wiping the lead onto the copper pipe, as for a lead-lead joint. However the Pb_{80}Sn_{20} solder used for wiping is poorly wetting onto copper, and so that must be tinned first, using a more tin-rich solder and an active flux.

=== Underground cables ===
Lead-sheathed cables were also used for telephone cables, as the lead outer sheath lasted well buried in wet ground. Jointing such cables could also require wiped lead joints. A typical such joint would involve a joint or tee junction between cables, with the copper pairs inside joined by fine soldering and insulating, then the overall joint wrapped in lead sheet and soldered. Such jointing continued until the 1960s and the availability of polyethylene sheathed cables.

Wiped joints continue to be made for as long as there are lead pipes in service. Although lead pipework is now rare, for health reasons, wiping a joint remains the usual way of joining it. Commonly though a joint is to be made by shortening the old lead and installing new copper or plastic piping beyond the joint. These joints are usually made today with a proprietary mechanical joint, sealing onto the soft lead by some mechanical compression ring.

=== Car bodywork ===
An older technique for body filler on car bodywork, before the plastic age, was the use of body solder. This was a lead-based wiping technique to fill gaps and low spots in steel bodywork, by applying solder with a similar wiping technique and a wooden paddle. The solder used was of even lower tin content, around 10%.

== See also ==
- Lead burning
