= The Brief (1984 TV series) =

- Developed by: TVS Television
- Starring: Ray Lonnen; Isobel Black
- Country of origin: United Kingdom
- Original language: English
- No. of series: 1
- No. of episodes: 13

Production
- Executive producer: James Gatward
- Producer: Rex Firkin
- Running time: 60 minutes (including adverts)

Original release
- Network: ITV
- Release: 26 June – 18 September 1984

The Brief is a British drama series produced for ITV by Television South (TVS) at its Southampton studios. The thirteen episodes were broadcast between 26 June and 18 September in 1984.

The series was mostly written by Ray Jenkins, produced by Rex Firkin and executive produced by James Gatward. The directors were Frank Cox, Richard Martin, John Frankau and Mike Gibbon.

== Overview ==
Ray Lonnen played the role of barrister Lucas Hellier, who goes to Germany to defend a British soldier accused of defecting to the East. Other notable characters included Hellier's wife Samantha (Isobel Black) and his mistress Annika Newman (Sabine Postel).

The Brief has never been repeated or released on DVD. This is possibly due to ongoing rights issues after the production company, TVS, lost its ITV franchise at the end of 1992 and subsequently went through a number of take-overs. This problem affects the majority of the TVS programme archive as much of the original production paperwork and sales documentation has been lost during the intervening years. According to Kaleidoscope's TV Brain website, the entire series has been wiped from the archives even though the same organisation listed it as existing in full as recently as 2010, in their British Independent Television Drama Research Guide 1955-2010.
