= James Bree (actor) =

British actor (1923–2008)

- Born: James Rutherfoord Worsfold Thomson; 20 July 1923; East Coker, Somerset, England
- Died: 1 December 2008 (aged 85); London, England
- Education: Royal Central School of Speech and Drama
- Occupation: Actor
- Years active: 1957–1996

James Rutherfoord Worsfold Thomson (20 July 1923 – 1 December 2008), known professionally as James Bree, was a British actor who appeared on stage, and played many supporting roles in both film and television.

Bree was educated at Radley College near Abingdon, Oxfordshire and during the Second World War served in the RAF. He later trained at the Central School of Speech and Drama. He changed his surname to Thomson-Bree after inheriting land from his great-uncle, Archdeacon William Bree.

On stage, Bree was in the original productions of Thornton Wilder's The Matchmaker in London's West End in 1954; and in John Arden's Sergeant Musgrave's Dance at the Royal Court in 1959. He was also one of the founder members of Peter Hall's Royal Shakespeare Company at Stratford in 1960.

On screen, he was cast as Blofeld's attorney Gumbold in the 1969 James Bond film On Her Majesty's Secret Service, and for his role as Uncle Arthur in The Jewel in the Crown.

Bree performed three roles in the original series of Doctor Who. He played the Security Chief in the 1969 Patrick Troughton story The War Games, Nefred in the 1980 Tom Baker story Full Circle and Keeper of the Matrix in the 1986 Colin Baker story The Ultimate Foe.

He died in December 2008, aged 85, after a long illness.

== Filmography ==
Film

- Just My Luck (1957) – Ford (uncredited)
- Never Let Go (1960) – Orders Clerk
- A Matter of Choice (1963) – Alfred
- Who Was Maddox? (1964) – Reynolds
- On Her Majesty's Secret Service (1969) – Gebrüder Gumbold
- Satan's Slave (1976) – Malcolm Yorke
- The Odd Job (1978) – Mr. Kemp
- On the Black Hill (1988) – Colonel Bickerton
- Without a Clue (1988) – Barrister

Television

- The Avengers (1963–1968) – Arthur Wilkington / Miller
- Z-Cars (1964–1972) – Smedley / Mr. Hodge / Tim Duncan
- R3 (1965) – Professor Chernev
- The Prisoner (1967) – Villers
- The Troubleshooters (1967–1968) – Winbush / Jack Lang
- The First Lady (1968) – Richard Pettifer
- Doctor Who (1969–1986) – Security Chief / Nefred / Keeper of the Matrix
- Randall and Hopkirk (1969) – Mullet, the InnKeeper
- Codename (1970) – Meyer
- Doctor at Large (1971) – Mr. Gilbert
- The Persuaders! (1971) – Bill Wilton
- Upstairs, Downstairs (1971) – Sir Adam
- The Shadow of the Tower (1972) – The Priest
- Ace of Wands (1972) – Matilda Edgington / The Major
- Softly, Softly: Task Force (1972) – George Bensfield
- Special Branch (1973)
- Looking for Clancy (1975) – Guy Wall
- Madame Bovary (1975) – Beadle
- Hadleigh (1976) – Robert Marshall
- I, Claudius (1976) – Montanus
- The Duchess of Duke Street (1976) – Ross
- Rising Damp (1977) – Peppery Man
- Secret Army (1977) – Gaston Colbert
- The Sweeney (1978) – Saxby
- All Creatures Great and Small (1978–1988) – Humphrey Cobb / Mr. Plenderleith
- The Professionals (1978) – Grant
- Rumpole of the Bailey (1979) – Mr Glassworth
- The Jewel in the Crown (1984) – Uncle Arthur
- The Return of Sherlock Holmes (1986) – Coroner
- Silent Witness (1996) – Brewer
