= Drama-Logue Award =

American theater award

The Drama-Logue Award was an American theater award established in 1977, given by the publishers of Drama-Logue newspaper, a weekly west-coast theater trade publication. Winners were selected by the publication's theater critics, and would receive a certificate at an annual awards ceremony hosted by Drama-Logue founder Bill Bordy. The awards did not require any voting or agreement among critics; each critic could select as many award winners as they wished. As a result, many awards were issued each year. In some years, the number of winners was larger than the seating capacity of the venue where the ceremony was conducted. The award categories included Production, Direction, Musical Direction, Choreography, Writing, Performance, Ensemble Performance, Scenic Design, Sound Design, Lighting Design, Costume Design and Hair & Makeup Design.

== Acquisition ==
In May 1998, Backstage West bought the Drama-Logue publication, and the two publications merged. The Drama-Logue Awards were subsequently retired and replaced by the Back Stage West Garland Awards.
