= Ian Kennedy Martin =

British scriptwriter (1936–2026)

- Born: Ian Troy Kennedy Martin; 23 May 1936; London, England
- Died: 27 June 2026 (aged 90)
- Occupation: Television scriptwriter
- Relatives: Troy Kennedy Martin (brother)
- Writing career
- Years active: 1964–2012
- Notable work: The Sweeney

Ian Troy Kennedy Martin (23 May 1936 – 27 June 2026) was a British television scriptwriter who created the action drama series The Sweeney (1975–78).

== Career ==
Martin began his television career in the 1960s, first as a script editor on the military police drama series Redcap (1964) and then later as a writer on series such as The Troubleshooters (1965). In 1971 he worked on the popular BBC drama series The Onedin Line, which ran for nine years until 1980.

He also wrote the 1974 drama series The Capone Investment. He is best known for creating the popular police action drama series The Sweeney, produced by Euston Films for Thames Television, which ran on the ITV network from 1975 to 1978. It also spawned two feature film spin-offs. He is also known for writing the 1975 action film Mitchell.

After the end of The Sweeney in 1978, Kennedy Martin continued to write for various police and detective dramas. These included the BBC's Juliet Bravo and The Chinese Detective during the 1980s and ITV's TECX and The Knock in the 1990s.

Martin also wrote a number of novels, including Rekill and the dystopian science fiction novel The Last Crime, this last under the pseudonym John Domatilla. On 9 March 2009, his first play, The Berlin Hanover Express premiered at the Hampstead Theatre in North London.

== Personal life and death ==
Martin was the younger brother of scriptwriter Troy Kennedy Martin (Z-Cars, Edge of Darkness), with whom he worked on Redcap. Ian originally came up with a concept for a robbery film set near a traffic jam, which was purchased from him by Troy, who turned the idea into the film The Italian Job (1969).

Ian Kennedy Martin died from pancreatic cancer on 27 June 2026, aged 90.

== Filmography ==
- Mitchell (1975)
- Sweeney 2 (creator) (1978)
