= Dora Reisser =

British actress (born 1942)

- Born: February 1942 (age 84); Sofia, Bulgaria
- Education: Royal Academy of Dramatic Art
- Occupation: Actress
- Spouse: David Weston (m. 1962)

Dora Reisser (born February 1942) is a former British actress and fashion designer.

== Life ==
Dora Reisser was a refugee from the Nazi regime as a child.

She attended RADA, graduating in 1962.

Reisser worked as an actress, but then gave up acting career to raise a family and become one of leading fashion designers in Britain.

== Selected filmography ==
=== Film ===
Year	Title	Role	Notes
1964	Who Was Maddox?	Anne Wilding	
1964	The System	Ingrid	uncredited
1967	The Dirty Dozen	German Officer's Girl	

=== Television ===
Year	Title	Role	Notes
1962	Compact	Fraulein Adelhof	Episode: "Business as Usual"
1963	The Sentimental Agent	Tania	Episode: "All That Jazz"
1964	Espionage	Eugenia	Episode: "Some Other Kind of World"
1965	The Wednesday Play	Siggy	Episode: "Dan, Dan, the Charity Man"
1965	No Hiding Place	Inga Bartels	Episode: "Truth or Dare"
1966	The Baron	Eva Dumel	Episode: "Diplomatic Immunity"
1966	Emergency Ward 10	Valda	Episode #1.921
1968	Man in a Suitcase	Janine Dufont	Episode: "Three Blinks of the Eyes"
1969	The Avengers	Inga Tilson	Episode 6.27: "Thingumajig"
1970	From a Bird's Eye View	Gina	Episode: "Wife Trouble"
1972	Pathfinders	Arlette	Episode: "Our Daffodils Are Better Than Your Daffodils"
1972	Clouds of Witness	Simone Vonderaa	Episode #1.5
1973	Z-Cars	Elizabeth Racinska	Episode: "Defection"
1974	Special Branch	Claudia	Episode: "Entente Cordiale"
