= The Troubleshooters (British TV series) =

British TV drama series (1965–1972)

- Also known as: Mogul
- Genre: Drama
- Created by: John Elliot
- Starring: Geoffrey Keen; Ray Barrett; Philip Latham; Robert Hardy; Barry Foster; Ronald Hines; John Carson
- Theme music composer: Tom Springfield
- Country of origin: United Kingdom
- Original language: English
- No. of series: 7
- No. of episodes: 136 (88 missing) (list of episodes)

Production
- Producers: Peter Graham Scott (1965–1968); Anthony Read (1969–1972)
- Running time: 50 minutes

Original release
- Network: BBC1
- Release: 7 July 1965 – 3 January 1972

The Troubleshooters (titled Mogul for its first series) is a British television drama series made by the BBC and broadcast on BBC1 from 1965 to 1972. Created by John Elliot, it followed the executives and field men of Mogul, a fictional international oil company, from the boardroom in London to drilling rigs, refineries and tankers around the world.

The first series, produced by Peter Graham Scott, was a run of largely self-contained plays and drew disappointing audiences, but it was renewed on condition that it became more popular and took a new title. From 1966, as The Troubleshooters, it centred on a small regular cast led by Geoffrey Keen as Brian Stead, Ray Barrett as Peter Thornton, Philip Latham as Willy Izard and Robert Hardy as Alec Stewart. It won the Guild of Television Producers and Directors award for the best drama series of 1966, regularly drew audiences of seven to nine million, and was sold overseas. Anthony Read produced the last three series, the final two of which were made in colour.

The series ran for seven series and 136 episodes. Under the BBC's wiping policy of the time most of the videotapes were erased, and 48 episodes are known to survive, most of them as black-and-white film recordings.

== Production ==
=== Origins ===
Elliot, a former BBC drama producer, wanted to write a dramatised series about big business and the great modern companies, and settled on the oil industry. He had begun work on it more than eighteen months before the first transmission. The oil companies were wary of the project, and of the company name Mogul, but Shell and BP agreed to co-operate after Elliot and the BBC made changes to the opening story; in return episodes carried a credit acknowledging the help of the British oil industry.

=== Mogul (1965) ===
The first series of thirteen episodes began on 7 July 1965. Keen played Brian Stead, Mogul's director of operations, with Latham as the company secretary Willy Izard and Barrett as Peter Thornton, the manager of North Sea operations; Barry Foster and Ronald Hines played the executives Robert Driscoll and Derek Prentice. Scott produced, with Anthony Read as story editor, and the theme music was by Tom Springfield.

The first episode was well received by much of the press. The Daily Sketch called it "a rattling good start" and the Daily Mirror predicted a starry future for Barrett, while Tom Gregg in The Guardian concluded that the BBC might have "a gusher on her hands". Audiences were disappointing, however: in September 1965 The Observer noted that the BBC was keeping on a programme which attracted only half as many viewers as the one it was dropping.

=== The Troubleshooters (1966–1972) ===
A second series was agreed on condition that the programme was made more generally popular and given a new title. The format was rebuilt around a smaller regular cast. Driscoll and Prentice were dropped, and two troubleshooters, Thornton and the newly created Alec Stewart, played by Hardy, led alternate episodes. Elliot proposed the new title himself. He wrote fewer of the scripts from this point, and a team of writers including John Lucarotti, James Mitchell, Ian Kennedy Martin, David Weir and Read himself supplied most of the episodes.

The series moved from Wednesdays to Saturdays in 1966, to Mondays in 1967, to Fridays for the fourth series in 1967–68 and back to Mondays from 1969. Read succeeded Scott as producer for the fifth series in 1969. The sixth series, which began on 18 May 1970, was made in colour. Hardy made his last appearance as Stewart in July 1970, and for the seventh series John Carson joined the cast as James Langley, who becomes Mogul's deputy chairman. The last episode was broadcast on 3 January 1972.

Location filming took the series to, among other places, Hong Kong, Singapore, Ceylon, West Berlin, Haiti and the Caribbean.

== Cast ==
=== Main ===
- Geoffrey Keen as Brian Stead (1965–1972), Mogul's director of operations, later managing director
- Ray Barrett as Peter Thornton (1965–1972), manager of North Sea operations, later the company's leading troubleshooter
- Philip Latham as Willy Izard (1965–1972), the company secretary, later deputy managing director and finance director
- Robert Hardy as Alec Stewart (1966–1970), an ambitious executive and Thornton's rival
- Barry Foster as Robert Driscoll (1965), Stead's original troubleshooter
- Ronald Hines as Derek Prentice (1965), personnel manager
- John Carson as James Langley (1971–1972), head of Mogul Scandinavia, later deputy chairman

=== Recurring ===
- Philippa Gail as Jane Webb (1965–1966, 1970–1971), Stead's secretary
- Justine Lord as "Steve" Thornton (1965–1966, 1968), Thornton's wife
- Deborah Stanford as Roz Stewart (1966–1970), Stewart's wife, who opens a London boutique
- Isobel Black as Eileen O'Rourke (1967–1968), public relations officer
- Edward de Souza as Charles Grandmercy (1967–1968), Stead's assistant
- Virginia Wetherell as Julie Serres (1967)
- Jayne Sofiano as Dr Ginny Vickers (1969), Stewart's personal assistant
- Dora Reisser as Ghislaine Foss (1969)
- Bruce Boa as Bill Douglas (1969), a troubleshooter for the rival company Zenith
- Margaret Ward as Joan Izard (1965–1971)
- Beryl Cooke as Miss Jenkins (1970–1971)
- Arthur Pentelow as Bishop, the managing director (1965–1966)
- Jack Gwillim and Geoffrey Toone as Sir Charles Bliss, Mogul's chairman (1967–1971)

== Episodes ==
Seven series totalling 136 episodes were broadcast on BBC1 between 7 July 1965 and 3 January 1972: thirteen in 1965, twenty-six in 1966, thirteen in 1967, twenty-six in 1967–68, twenty-six in 1969, seventeen in 1970 and fifteen in 1971–72.

== Storylines ==
The first series ranged across Mogul's operations, from a leak of drilling results from a North Sea rig and the bargaining for oil concessions in the Middle East to a strike in a Tyneside shipyard and a challenge to Stead's position on the board. From the second series the stories turned increasingly on the rivalry between Thornton and Stewart, and on continuing threads that ran across several series: the collapse of Thornton's marriage, a struggle for a vacant seat on the board in 1967 that ended with Stead and Stewart fighting a contest in which "the loser must go", and, from 1969, the battle between Mogul and a rival company, Zenith, which culminated in a merger fight. In the seventh series the arrival of Langley as deputy chairman posed a new threat to Stead.

Many episodes dealt with industrial and political subjects of the day: labour disputes, including the occupation of a Mogul depot by redundant workers; the Rhodesian oil embargo; the Vietnam War, the war in Angola and the Arab–Israeli conflict; and opposition to oil development from local communities, from a Welsh town facing a new refinery to Māori landowners in New Zealand. Others put the regular characters in personal danger: Stewart is imprisoned in Algeria as a spy, Izard is captured by mercenaries in an African civil war, and Thornton, worn out after assignments in Alaska and Australia, resigns from Mogul before being persuaded back.

In the last episode, "Whatever Became of the Year 2000?", Stead plans to retire, but when the chairman, Sir Charles Bliss, unexpectedly retires, Stead is offered the chairmanship himself.

== Reception ==
After its uncertain start the series became one of BBC1's established drama series. Its producer, Peter Graham Scott, won the Guild of Television Producers and Directors craft award for a dramatic series for his work on it in 1966. The BBC's published audience figures gave a typical audience of 7.5 million in the first three months of 1967 and 8.75 million in the same months of 1968, and 7.75 million in August 1970. In 1971 Elliot received the Society of Film and Television Arts' Shell International Award for the series.

The series was also sold overseas; in Singapore, The Straits Times was still listing episodes in late 1972.

== Parallels with real events ==
Elliot built the series from research among the public relations departments of the major oil companies, and its storylines often came close to real events.

- BP announced its oil strike in Alaska three days before "They've More Than Their Assets Frozen" showed Mogul striking oil there; the producer, Anthony Read, said the episode had been "in the can" since the previous November.
- Soon after "The Day the Sea Caught Fire", in which a gas explosion wrecks a Mogul rig, was recorded, there was a real explosion in the North Sea, and the RAF had to set fire to the sea as a warning to shipping.
- A real earthquake struck on the night "And the Walls Came Tumbling Down" was recorded, and another on the night before it was shown.
- Elliot also cited the death of Donald Campbell soon after an episode about a fatal water-speed record attempt, and the secession of Biafra from Nigeria, which the series had anticipated.
- "The Deeper You Dig" (January 1968) drew on the political argument then under way over plans for a Channel Tunnel.
- Geoffrey Keen was a guest at an Oil Industries Club dinner, where he was greeted as a fellow oilman.

== Archive status ==
The series was subject to the BBC's wiping policy of the era, and copies of 48 of the 136 episodes are known to survive. They include the opening episode, "Kelly's Eye", and the whole of the seventh series. Only one colour episode, "Camelot on a Clear Day", survives in colour; the other surviving colour episodes exist only as black-and-white film recordings.

Two missing episodes, "Kitchener Knew It Well" and "Really She Did, She Really Did", survive as domestic off-air audio recordings. The otherwise missing episode "You're Not Going to Believe This, But..." was remade with a different cast as a technical trial of a dual film and video camera, and the remake survives.

Several episodes have been recovered. A 16mm print of the first-series episode "Wildcat" was bought from a private collector in the late 1990s and screened at the National Film Theatre's Missing Believed Wiped event; the print was passed to the BBC archive in 2023. In May 2010 a print of the second-series episode "Birdstrike", held by a private collector, was made available to the BBC with the help of the classic television organisation Kaleidoscope. In October 2023 the recovery of "Is That Tiger, Man", the first episode of the second series, was announced, with the assistance of Film is Fabulous! and De Montfort University's Cinema and Television History Institute.

For the archive status of every episode, see List of The Troubleshooters (British TV series) episodes.

== Home media ==
Five of the six surviving first-series episodes, "Kelly's Eye", "Young Turk", "Tosh and Nora", "Out of Range" and "Stoneface", were released on DVD in the UK by Danann Publishing on 31 October 2016 as a 50th anniversary edition.
