= List of Bergerac episodes =

This is a list of episodes for the 1981–1991 BBC television series Bergerac.

For the reboot from 2025, see Bergerac (2025 TV series).

== Series overview ==
Series	Episodes	Originally released	
Series	Episodes	First released	Last released
1	10	18 October 1981	20 December 1981
2	9	9 January 1983	6 March 1983
3	10	3 December 1983	4 February 1984
4	9	11 October 1985	20 December 1985
Christmas special		26 December 1986	
5	8	3 January 1987	21 February 1987
Christmas special		26 December 1987	
6	7	2 January 1988	13 February 1988
Christmas special		27 December 1988	
7	8	28 January 1989	18 March 1989
Christmas special		23 December 1989	
8	10	14 January 1990	18 March 1990
Christmas special		26 December 1990	
9	10	5 January 1991	9 March 1991
Christmas special		26 December 1991	

== Episodes ==
=== Series 1 (1981) ===
Episode	Title	Written by	Directed by	Guest stars	Original air date
1	Picking It Up	Robert Banks Stewart	Martyn Friend	Danny Schiller, Floella Benjamin, Judith Byfield, David Savile, Roland Oliver, Graeme Eton	18 October 1981
2	Nice People Die in Bed	John Kershaw	Martin Campbell	Rosemary Martin, Richard Morant, Ian Redford, George Little, Lloyd McGuire	25 October 1981
3	Unlucky Dip	Bob Baker	Ian Toynton	Prunella Scales, Jack Galloway, John Rowe, Brian Hall	1 November 1981
4	Campaign for Silence	Alistair Bell	Martyn Friend	Ian Hendry, Simon Cadell, Jane Wenham, Peter Dahlsen, John Gillett, Julian Fox, Neil Hallett, Jay Neill, John Golightly	8 November 1981
5	See You in Moscow	Gerry O'Hara	Don Leaver	Sara Kestelman, Bernard Gallagher, Anthony Head, Michael Osborne, George Irving, Ray Mort, Harry Waters	15 November 1981
6	Portrait of Yesterday	Dennis Spooner	Laurence Moody	Sarah Lawson, Derek Farr, Tenniel Evans, Charles Kay, Christopher Villiers, David Webb	22 November 1981
7	Last Chance for a Loser	Philip Broadley	Ian Toynton	Patrick Mower, Sarah Douglas, Sean Caffrey, Kevin Stoney, Bill Treacher, George Roubicek, Ishia Bennison	29 November 1981
8	Late for a Funeral	Dennis Spooner	Henry Herbert	James Cossins, Christopher Ellison, Ann Tirard, Leon Eagles, Eric Mason, Gary Watson, Glen Murphy	6 December 1981
9	Relative Values	Peter Miller	Martin Campbell	Lynda La Plante (billed as Lynda Marchal), Maureen O'Brien, Warren Clarke, Geoffrey Bayldon, John Carlisle, Freddie Earlle	13 December 1981
10	The Hood and the Harlequin	Terence Feely	Roger Tucker	Greta Scacchi, Anthony Forrest, Marc Boyle, Lawrence Davidson, Tim Audrain	20 December 1981

=== Series 2 (1983) ===
Episode	Title	Written by	Directed by	Guest stars	Original air date
1	A Message for the Rich	Robert Banks Stewart	Alan Grint	Dandy Nichols, Phil Davis, Norman Jones, Kevin Stoney	9 January 1983
2	Always Leave Them Laughing	Robert Banks Stewart, Peter Miller	Peter Smith	Joanne Whalley, Brian Capron, Edward Phillips, Harry Littlewood, Rikki Fulton	16 January 1983
3	Clap Hands, Here Comes Charlie	Dennis Spooner	Michael Rolfe	William Hootkins, Gareth Thomas, Victor Lucas, Ling Tai, Hayden Jones	23 January 1983
4	Prime Target	Robert Banks Stewart, Robert Holmes	Henry Herbert	Anthony Valentine, Catherine Schell, Nickolas Grace, Nell Campbell, Marc Sinden, Tamara Ustinov	30 January 1983
5	Almost Like a Holiday	Alistair Bell	Laurence Moody	Norman Wisdom, Michael Attwell, Sheila Ruskin, Elvi Hale, Jeff Rawle, Kevin Stoney, David Quilter, Penelope Lee, Roy Spencer	6 February 1983
6	Fall of a Birdman	Paul Wheeler	Ben Bolt	Richard Griffiths, Philip Stone, Donald Sumpter, Brian Grellis	13 February 1983
7	A Miracle Every Week	Robert Banks Stewart, Leslie Darbon	Colin Bucksey	Art Malik, Nicholas Ball, Denis Lawson, Derek Thompson, Zienia Merton, Ben Aris, Timothy Block, David Purcell	20 February 1983
8	A Perfect Recapture	Paul Wheeler	Paul Ciappessoni	Ronald Hines, Barbara Shelley, Yves-Marie Maurin (credited as Yves-Marie), Mark Burns, Richard Beale, Tracey Childs	27 February 1983
9	The Moonlight Girls	Bob Baker	Michael Rolfe	Jeremy Child, Alibe Parsons, Kevin Stoney, Maya Woolfe, Elizabeth Bennett, Peter Craze, Nicolas Chagrin	6 March 1983

=== Series 3 (1983–84) ===
Episode	Title	Written by	Directed by	Guest stars	Original air date
1	Ninety Per Cent Proof	Brian Clemens	Robert Young	Carol Royle, Ray Winstone, John Gordon Sinclair, Anthony Steel, Dallas Adams, Neville Barber	3 December 1983
2	A Hole in the Bucket	Bill Craig	Ian Toynton	Celia Gregory, Rosy Clayton, Donald Morley, Barrie Cookson, Godfrey James, Peter Childs	10 December 1983
3	Holiday Snaps	Nick McCarty	Ben Bolt	Lee Montague, Michael Angelis, Jean Boht, Brian Hawksley, Graham Cull	17 December 1983
4	Ice Maiden	Rod Beacham	Robert Tronson	Liza Goddard, Dave King, Richard Hurndall, Frederick Hall, Ian Collier	24 December 1983
5	Come Out Fighting	Alistair Bell	Robert Young	Lee Montague, Oliver Cotton, Tony Osoba, Eva Mottley, John Abineri, Kevin Lloyd, Clifford Rose, Brian McDermott, Tessa Peake-Jones, Timothy Block, Richard Steele	31 December 1983
6	A Touch of Eastern Promise	Brian Finch	Christopher King	Zia Mohyeddin, Nadim Sawalha, Raad Rawi	7 January 1984
7	A Cry in the Night	Robert Holmes	Oliver Horsbrugh	Don Hawkins, David Buck, Primi Townsend, Rosalind Lloyd, Peter Birrel, Frank Mills, Derek Smith	14 January 1984
8	The Company You Keep	Tony Hoare	David Reynolds	Mel Martin, Tony Selby, Denis Lill, Mike Grady, Angela Browne, Ralph Michael, Roy Barraclough	21 January 1984
9	Tug of War	Paul Wheeler	Laurence Moody	Alan Lake, Stephen Yardley, Shirley Stelfox, Marianne Borgo, Edwin Richfield, Mary Tamm	28 January 1984
10	House Guests	Bill Craig	Robert Tronson	Patrick Allen, Dudley Sutton, Kate Fahy, Gerald Sim, Jeffrey Segal, Eric Mason, Wolfe Morris, Robert Cartland	4 February 1984

=== Series 4 (1985) ===
Episode	Title	Written by	Directed by	Guest stars	Original air date
1	The Last Interview	Robert Banks Stewart	Brian Farnham	Barry Foster, Kate Harper, Stephen McGann, Gareth Milne, Eileen Helsby, John Rolfe	11 October 1985
2	Off Shore Trades	Nick McCarty	Robert Tronson	Ian McCulloch, Bernard Archard, Nicolas Chagrin, Carole Ashby, Arthur Blake, Gilbert Wynne, Jon Croft, Patrick Duncan, Leonie Mellinger, Stephen Riddle	18 October 1985
3	What Dreams May Come?	Brian Finch	Ben Bolt	Charles Gray, Jill Meager, Malcolm Tierney, John Ringham, Jim Morris, John Abbott, Hubert Rees	25 October 1985
4	Low Profile	Roger Davenport	David Reynolds	Beryl Reid, Mark Strickson, Jerome Willis, Benjamin Whitrow, Lois Baxter, Martin Fisk	1 November 1985
5	Return of the Ice Maiden	Rod Beacham	Michael Custance	Liza Goddard, Elizabeth Spriggs, Terry John, Ian Marter, John Baker	8 November 1985
6	Chrissie	Edwin Pearce	David Reynolds	Veronica Smart, Duncan Preston, Sheila Ruskin, Hilary Mason, Michelle Collins, Perry Fenwick, Rosie Marcel, Arthur Cox, Clare Clifford	15 November 1985
7	The Tennis Racket	Terry James	Les Chatfield	Reece Dinsdale, Constance Chapman, Andrew Burt	29 November 1985
8	Sins of the Fathers	Tessa Coleman	Graeme Harper	Warren Clarke, Lynn Farleigh, Francesca Brill, Ursula Howells, Maurice Roëves, Ivor Roberts, Petra Markham, Terry Molloy, Andrew McCulloch, Dennis Edwards	13 December 1985
9	Avenge O Lord	John Fletcher	Robert Tronson	Bernard Hepton, Ian Redford, Terrence Hardiman, Haluk Bilginer, Ian McNeice	20 December 1985

=== Christmas special (1986) ===
Title	Written by	Directed by	Guest stars	Original air date
Fires in the Fall	Chris Boucher	Tom Clegg	Paul Brooke, Amanda Redman, Barrie Ingham, Margaretta Scott, Ron Pember, Nicholas McArdle, Jim McManus	26 December 1986

=== Series 5 (1987) ===
Episode	Title	Written by	Directed by	Guest stars	Original air date
1	The Memory Man	Chris Boucher	Graeme Harper	Jeremy Clyde, Judy Cornwell, Richard Morant, Jeremy Sinden, Nigel Lambert, Philip Hurd-Wood	3 January 1987
2	Winner Takes All	Robert Holmes	Robert Young	Michael Gambon, Connie Booth, Nick Brimble, David Schofield	10 January 1987
3	Root and Branch	Brian Finch	Baz Taylor	Christopher Fairbank, Barbara Atkinson	17 January 1987
4	A Desirable Little Residence	Rod Beacham	Robert Tronson	George Shane, Liz Crowther, Harry Landis, Milton Johns	24 January 1987
5	The Deadly Virus	Nick McCarty	Gerry Mill	Rosemary Martin, Daniel Hill, Peter Llewellyn Williams, Ian Thompson, Mary Healey, Desmond McNamara	31 January 1987
6	S.P.A.R.T.A.	Rod Beacham	Robert Young	Liza Goddard, David Calder, Judy Buxton, John Hartley	7 February 1987
7	Thanks for Everything	Nick McCarty	Richard Bramall	Lee Montague, Morag Hood, Rowena Cooper, Geoffrey Bateman, Davyd Harries, Christian Rodska	14 February 1987
8	Poison	John Fletcher	Robert Tronson	Alfred Burke, Bernard Archard, Peter Tuddenham, Philip Anthony, Philip Bond	21 February 1987

=== Christmas special (1987) ===
Title	Written by	Directed by	Guest stars	Original air date
Treasure Hunt	Rod Beacham	Robert Tronson	Liza Goddard, Peter Jeffrey, James Maxwell, Carole Harrison, Michael Melia, Gareth Milne	26 December 1987

=== Series 6 (1988) ===
Episode	Title	Written by	Directed by	Guest stars	Original air date
1	Whatever Lola Wants	Brian Finch	Nigel Finch	Ann Mitchell, Ronald Lacey, Ron Cook	2 January 1988
2	Crossed Swords	Edwin Pearce	David Carson	Cherry Gillespie, James Warwick, Peter Woodward, Ken Bones, Patricia Quinn, Colin Jeavons, Nick Burnell, Terry Walsh	9 January 1988
3	A Horse of a Different Colour	Rod Beacham	Matthew Robinson	Liza Goddard, Tony Haygarth, Shirley Stelfox, Donald Burton	16 January 1988
4	Burnt	John Fletcher	Robert Tronson	Ronald Pickup, Vivian Pickles, James Cossins, Tyler Butterworth, Tenniel Evans, David Gooderson, Graham Weston, William Maxwell	23 January 1988
5	The Sin of Forgiveness	John Collee	Tristan DeVere Cole	John Bennett, Susan Fleetwood, Alan MacNaughtan, David John Pope	30 January 1988
6	A Man of Sorrows	John Fletcher	Geoffrey Sax	Jack Galloway, George Baker, William Simons, Donald Douglas, Valentino Musetti	6 February 1988
7	Private Fight	Edmund Ward	Alan Dossor	Eric Allan, John Forgeham, Ralph Nossek, Lill Roughley, Nick Stringer, Alan Ford	13 February 1988

=== Christmas special (1988) ===
Title	Written by	Directed by	Guest stars	Original air date
Retirement Plan	Edmund Ward	Edward Bennett	Nicholas Ball, James Laurenson, Sue Lloyd, Sylvester Morand, Anthony Calf, Carmen du Sautoy, Danny Webb	27 December 1988

=== Series 7 (1989) ===
Episode	Title	Written by	Directed by	Guest stars	Original air date
1	Sea Changes	Edwin Pearce	Richard Standeven	Edward Brayshaw, Denica Fairman, Sean Caffrey, David McAlister	28 January 1989
2	Natural Enemies	Andrew Caine	Geoffrey Sax	Susan Penhaligon, Kenneth Cope, Billy J. Mitchell, Pat Starr, Joanne Bell	4 February 1989
3	Tangos in the Night	John Fletcher	Stuart Urban	Hetty Baynes, Stephen McGann, Sarah Lawson, Reginald Marsh, Tony Adams	11 February 1989
4	The Other Woman	John Collee	Peter Ellis	Frances Tomelty, Jack Watling, Karl Johnson	18 February 1989
5	Weekend Off	John Milne	Charlie Naim	James Faulkner, David Troughton, Simon Dutton, Geoffrey Hutchings, Marianne Borgo	25 February 1989
6	When Did You Last See Your Father?	Robert Banks Stewart	Alex Kirby	Benedict Taylor, Tom Radcliffe, Philip Locke, Annabel Leventon, Geoffrey Beevers, Harry Jones	4 March 1989
7	Old Acquaintance	Rod Beacham	Richard Standeven	Liza Goddard, Ben Onwukwe, David Neilson, Jill Benedict	11 March 1989
8	Trenchard's Last Case	Brian Finch	Mike Barnes	Alec McCowen, George Costigan, Catherine Neilson	18 March 1989

=== Christmas special (1989) ===
Title	Written by	Directed by	Guest stars	Original air date
Second Time Around	Ian Kennedy Martin	Peter Ellis	Chris Langham, Jenifer Landor, Andrew Sachs, David Schofield, Donald Sumpter, Prentis Hancock, Richard Hawley	23 December 1989

=== Series 8 (1990) ===
Episode	Title	Written by	Directed by	Guest stars	Original air date
1	A True Detective	John Milne	Richard Bramall	Julian Wadham, Louis Mahoney, Philip Whitchurch, John Cater, Tim Whitnall, John Hart Dyke	14 January 1990
2	My Name's Sergeant Bergerac	John Milne	Michael Brayshaw	Tony Robinson, Sue Lloyd, John Bluthal, Ronald Allen, Derren Nesbitt, Johanna Hargreaves, Barry Jackson, Jennifer Clulow, Noel Dyson	21 January 1990
3	The Dig	John Collee	Geoffrey Sax	Susan Wooldridge, Trevor Cooper, Gordon Gostelow	28 January 1990
4	Roots of Evil	Brian Finch	Richard Spence	Geoffrey Palmer, Lynsey Baxter, Steve McFadden, Struan Rodger	4 February 1990
5	Entente Cordiale	Jeremy Burnham	Ken Grieve	Peter Miles, John Abineri, Michael Cronin, Jack Watling	11 February 1990
6	In Love and War	John Collee	Jeremy Ancock	Brenda Bruce, Clive Merrison	18 February 1990
7	Under Wraps	Edmund Ward	Geoffrey Sax	Geoffrey Chater, Alfred Lynch, Leonard Trolley, Jerome Flynn	25 February 1990
8	All the Sad Songs	Rod Beacham	Tim Fywell	Gary Bond, Diane Langton, Peter Martin, Jeff Nuttall	4 March 1990
9	The Messenger Boy	Cyril Williams	Tristan DeVere Cole	Andrew Burt, Alec Sabin	11 March 1990
10	Diplomatic Incident	David Crane	Ken Grieve	Julian Glover, Tip Tipping	18 March 1990

=== Christmas special (1990) ===
Title	Written by	Directed by	Guest stars	Original air date
There for the Picking	Desmond Lowden	Gordon Flemyng	Warren Saire, Melanie Thaw, Kenneth Cranham, Simon Chandler, David Hargreaves, Paula Topham, Lawrence Davidson, Luke Hanson	26 December 1990

=== Series 9 (1991) ===
Episode	Title	Written by	Directed by	Guest stars	Original air date
1	Something to Hide	Cyril Williams	Tony Dow	Jack Watling, David de Keyser	5 January 1991
2	The Dark Horse	John Milne	Tristan DeVere Cole	Frederick Treves, Bernice Stegers, Peter-Hugo Daly, Lloyd McGuire	12 January 1991
3	Snow in Provence	John Milne	Tony Dow	Louise Lombard, Pippa Guard, Martin Cochrane, André Maranne	19 January 1991
4	The Evil That Men Do	John Brown	Tristan DeVere Cole	John Hallam, Maxine Audley, Robin Soans	26 January 1991
5	My Friend Charlie	Graham Hurley	Michael Rolfe	William Hootkins	2 February 1991
6	On the Rocks	Christopher Russell	Michael Rolfe	Jean Badin	9 February 1991
7	The Waiting Game	David Crane	Colm Villa	Jack Watling, Simon Oates, Eileen Way, Simon Coady	16 February 1991
8	Warriors	Tony MacNabb	Terry Green	Ursula Howells, Terence Harvey, Eamonn Walker, Leonard Maguire, Richard Caldicot, Oona Kirsch	23 February 1991
9	The Assassin	John Fletcher	Colm Villa	Christian Burgess, Peter Cellier	2 March 1991
10	The Lohans	Peter Palliser	Terry Green	Billy Murray, Kate Fahy, Cindy O'Callaghan	9 March 1991

=== Christmas special (1991) ===
Title	Written by	Directed by	Guest stars	Original air date
All for Love	John Milne	Terry Marcel	Bill Nighy, Simon Williams, Suzan Crowley, Philip Glenister, Jane Downs, Catherine Rabett, Gordon Salkilld, Iain Rattray	26 December 1991
