= George Bulman (fictional character) =

Alfred George "Alf" Bulman/George Kitchener Bulman
- The XYY Man character
- First appearance: The XYY Man
- Last appearance: Shadows
- Created by: Kenneth Royce
- Portrayed by: Don Henderson

In-universe information
- Gender: Male
- Occupation: Police officer
- Nationality: British

Detective Sergeant George Kitchener Bulman was a fictional detective created by Kenneth Royce in his series of books about The XYY Man (semi-reformed cat burglar Spider Scott), where the character's name was initially Alf Bulman. Here Bulman is presented as a 'bent copper', though the only examples of his corruption given are that he gained promotion to sergeant by persuading down-and-outs to confess to unsolved robberies, in return for a prison sentence which would put them inside during the coldest months of winter.

== Television appearances ==
These books were turned into a Granada TV series in the mid-1970s, with actor Don Henderson playing Bulman, Scott's nemesis. Bulman lives only for the day that he can put Scott (played on TV by Stephen Yardley) back behind bars, but he and his sidekick Detective Constable Derek Willis (Dennis Blanch) are thwarted every time, even gaining some slight sympathy and respect for Scott as they discover how he and they have been used by the secret service. Bulman was originally portrayed as mildly eccentric, wearing woollen gloves, using a nasal inhaler and trying to 'better' himself by engaging in further education (showing off his learning with a pretentious erudition which makes him look foolish).

The Bulman character proved popular with viewers, and, with Willis, was given a spin-off series Strangers, which saw the formerly London-based detectives transferred to the north-west of England. During the five-year run of Strangers, Bulman's eccentricities were increased, and included such traits as a propensity for keeping his belongings in plastic carrier bags and his keeping of a pet hamster named Flash Gordon. His middle name was revealed to be Kitchener. Increasingly his erudition was used less to make him look pretentious and a joke figure, but instead underlined a zen-like wisdom and otherworldliness. He also leapt in rank, gaining a double-promotion from Detective Sergeant to Detective Chief Inspector in one bound.

In the mid-80s the character returned in Bulman. Disillusioned, Bulman leaves the police to work as a private investigator while making a living repairing clocks. He kept a model railway layout in his office, and wore a 'Will Power' T-Shirt, bearing an illustration of William Shakespeare. Mirroring in some ways the post-prison career of Spider Scott, Bulman and his assistant Lucy McGinty (Siobhan Redmond) were often coerced or tricked into doing clandestine and dangerous work for the secret service.

== Literary return ==
Kenneth Royce returned to his Bulman character at the height of the show's success, writing two more XYY Man novels (The Crypto Man (1984) and The Mosley Receipt (1985)) and a Bulman novel, No Way Back (Hashimi's Revenge) in 1986. In the 90s he followed this with The Judas Trail (1996) and Shadows (1996). By this point, Royce's Bulman differs from the television version considerably - his is called Alfred George Bulman (the TV one is George Kitchener Bulman), and by The Crypto Man in 1985 has risen to be a Detective Superintendent in the Security Services section of the Metropolitan Police (his TV alternative never made it above Detective Chief Inspector before becoming a private investigator).

Granada ended the series in 1987. Henderson obtained the rights for TV use of the character, but became busy with other projects and died in 1997 before he was able to interest producers in any new series.

== List of television appearances ==
- The XYY Man (1976–77) 13 episodes
- Strangers (1978–82) 32 episodes
- Bulman (1985–87) 20 episodes
