= Lee Hunter (Hollyoaks) =

Fictional character from Hollyoaks

- Hollyoaks character
- Portrayed by: Alex Carter
- Duration: 2001–2005, 2010–2011
- First appearance: 4 July 2001
- Last appearance: 25 October 2011
- Introduced by: Jo Hallows (2001); Paul Marquess (2010)
- Spin-off appearances: In Too Deep (2004); Crossing the Line (2005); Hollyoaks: Freshers (2010)
In-universe information
- Occupation: Student; PR consultant
- Father: Les Hunter
- Mother: Sally Hunter
- Brothers: Dan Hunter
- Sisters: Ellie Mills; Lisa Hunter

Lee Hunter is a fictional character from the English soap opera Hollyoaks, played by Alex Carter. The character made his first on-screen appearance on 4 July 2001. Lee was introduced as part of the show's new family, the Hunters. He is the youngest son of Les (John Graham Davies) and Sally Hunter (Katherine Dow Blyton). Lee is characterised as "wayward", a "cheeky chap" and a "wheeler dealer". Carter announced his decision to quit the serial in 2005 to have more free time, filming his departure scenes in October 2005 and departed on-screen 23 December 2005.

Carter returned to Hollyoaks as a full-time character in September 2010, reintroduced by series producer Paul Marquess, although his comeback scenes aired in internet spin-off Hollyoaks: Freshers. Upon his return, the character has been described as "a tool", "confident" and "arrogant". In May 2011 it was announced Carter had quit again, in order to pursue other projects.

== Development ==
Alex Carter successfully auditioned for the role of Lee Hunter in 2001 and joined the cast of Hollyoaks as the youngest son of Les (John Graham Davies) and Sally Hunter (Katherine Dow Blyton) and brother to Ellie (Sarah Baxendale), Dan (Andrew McNair) and Lisa (Gemma Atkinson). The character made his first on-screen appearance on 5 July 2001.

Lee's early stories were centric to his inclusion in a friendship group consisting of his sister Lisa, Abby Davies (Helen Noble), Steph Dean (Carley Stenson), Zara Morgan (Kelly Greenwood) and Brian Drake (Jonathan Le Billon). One storyline featuring the group was story involving a rumour club. The students are set a task of creating a rumour club to assess how quickly gossip can spread around a community. The assignment is supposed to be fun but Zara and Steph use the opportunity to create trouble for other characters. Stenson told an Inside Soap reporter that Steph's motivation is "purely evil" and Lee becomes uncomfortable with hurting other character's emotionally. Zara and Steph create a rumour about Mandy Richardson (Sarah Jayne Dunn) and Laura Burns (Lesley Johnston) being in a lesbian relationship. Writers portrayed Lee's reluctance to defy Steph to prevent her from causing trouble. Stenson added that Lee does not want "anyone to get hurt" and wants it to be a "fun project". Ultimately he allows the rumour to circulate because he cannot risk "falling foul" of Steph's nasty tactics.

Writers created a relationship storyline between Lee and fellow student, Abby Davies (Helen Noble). Their relationship is tested when Abby leaves Chester to study at Brighton University. Lee remains in Hollyoaks and decides to take a beautician college course at the local campus. The pair also become engaged to marry, but a long-distance relationship begins to cause problems. Carter told reporters from All About Soap that "Lee is definitely missing Abby. Well, you would, they've just got engaged." Abby does not reply to Lee's text messages and Carter explained that Lee assumes that Abby is cheating on him. Abby later makes contact with Lee but their friend Zara Morgan (Kelly Greenwood) asks Abby how many new men she has met, causing Lee to become upset. Zara tries to cheer Lee up by taking him out for the day, but he cannot stop thinking about Abby. Carter said that viewers would soon tire of his character's whining. He added "people are going to get really sick of Lee soon – all he does is whinge about her for the next 20 episodes!"

In a comedic story, Lee fails his exams and decides to take beautician course despite wanting to do film studies. He is unhappy with his course and Carter explained that Lee's father Les does not approve. He wants Lee to do "something a bit more manly" but Carter enjoyed the storyline because he looked "great dressed in a beautician's outfit."

In 2004, writers explored the effect that Lee's parents tempestuous marriage has on him. Lee struggles with the prospect of the Hunters being a broken family. Carter told an Inside Soap reporter that "Lee is really struggling with the possibility that the Hunters may no longer be a real family." Lee decides to intervene in his parents' marriage and convinces his father Les to make an emotional speech to his mother, Sally. Carter explained that "seeing his parents split is the last straw" and he wants to prevent his parents from divorcing. Carter added that Les blunders his speech and further annoys Sally, which was typical to Les' characterisation. Carter assessed that it was actually "the final nail in the coffin" for the Hunter marriage. Les' further attempts woo Sally are also unsuccessful. Carter revealed that Les dresses in an old leather biking outfit to woo Sally. This creates hysterical laughter from Sally, who berates Les for thinking an old outfit could save their broken marriage. Carter concluded that "I think he'll just have to accept things will never be the same again." Writers used their problems to cause Lee turmoil. It coincided with Lee receiving his A level exam results. Carter wondered if his character would cope with the added stress but thought it made an "interesting" storyline. Lee struggles, to which he added that "everything's changing in Lee's world yet again and he's not great at coping at the best of times."

In March 2004, a reporter from the Sunday Mirror reported that Lee and the majority of the Hunter family would be axed along with ten other cast members. However Lee and the Hunter family remained in the serial and only six of the fourteen cast members announced were axed. In 2005 it was announced that Carter had quit the serial and would be leaving at the end of his contract. After developing feelings for friend Zara, who was leaving the village to do charity work in Thailand, Lee decided to accompany her, making his exit in the episode that aired on 22 December 2005. Speaking of his decision to quit in 2006, Carter said, "It'd been five years, and it was long hours – I was working weekends and things – and realistically I'd had five years out of my life, I just wanted my weekends back. I wanted a bit of a life as well as work." In an interview with OK! magazine in 2010, Carter discussed the reasons why he initially quit Hollyoaks commenting, "When I left Hollyoaks originally, in 2005, I was quite tired and ready to go, because of the schedules."

In 2010, Paul Marquess was appointed as the new Hollyoaks producer. He planned to give Hollyoaks a "shake up", changing the productions team, writing characters out and replacing them with new ones. It was announced on 15 March 2010, that Marquess had decided to reintroduce Lee to the serial as part of his revamp. Carter signed an initial six-month contract with the soap after announcing his decision to leave his role as Jamie Hope in Emmerdale. In an interview with entertainment website Digital Spy about Lee's return, Marquess explained, "He turns up with another character. He's been working as a Gareth Gates impersonator on a cruise ship and he won't just have light stories because Alex is great. He's one of our new students. The thing about our new students is the audience will recognise some of them." Carter revealed that he has previously been in talks with Marquess's predecessor Allan, whom he knew from previously working on the show.

In July 2010, it was announced that Carter would make his comeback scenes as Lee in new online spin-off Hollyoaks: Freshers. Speaking of his appearance in the spin-off, Carter said he was thrilled, commenting, "I'm thrilled to be back and it's really exciting that my first episodes are for the online spin-off." In the same month it was announced that Jessica Forrest had been cast as Lee's girlfriend Leanne Holiday. Digital Spy reported that Leanne would also appear in the spin-off before making her first appearance in Hollyoaks as a new student.

In May 2011 it was announced that Carter had decided to leave the serial in order to pursue other projects. Speaking of his departure, Carter stated: "After ten years in soap, it feels like the right time to find out what else is out there."

== Storylines ==
Lee first appears in May 2001 as a member of the village's new family: the Hunter family. His first appearance sees him brought home by the police. Lee gets into trouble at school, and starts to fail his exams. This causes him to develop depression, which is worsened by the fact that his oldest sister, Ellie, has been missing in Ibiza for over two years. She later arrives in Hollyoaks in 2002. Things get more problematic for Lee when his sister, Lisa is bullied by jealous classmate, Steph Dean (Carley Stenson), which causes her to self-harm. With the help of his family, Lee supports Lisa, and vows to for the entirety of his life. Lee gradually becomes close friends with Bombhead (Lee Otway). Lee's delighted when he starts to make money by schemes, but they often go wrong. Lee grows close to Abby and begins a relationship with her, which has various ups and downs. However, Lee has a fling with Abby's best friend, Zara.

Lee proposes to Abby and she accepts before leaving for the university in Brighton. Lee becomes miserable after her departure, which annoys his friends. He visits Abby and finds her in bed with another man, which leaves him devastated, especially when Abby breaks off their engagement. Abby tells him she made a mistake accepting his proposal. Subsequently, there was more bad news to face Lee when Ellie loses her memory, and accuses their brother Dan for killing her murderous husband, Toby Mills. Lee and the Hunter family turn against her for this. One year later, Dan died from car explosion. Lee accuses Ellie of mistreating Dan, and tells her, with the support of Lisa, that he no longer sees her as part of the family, causing Ellie to leave Hollyoaks.

Lee starts a beauty therapy course at Hollyoaks Community College, after he fails to enrol in film studies due to his poor grades. He becomes college president and alienates Bombhead. Lee's opponent Chris Fenwick (Chris Grierson) becomes vice president after Lee accepts him. Chris attempts to manipulate Lee into spending more than what the college fund has. Lee refuses to believe Bombhead when he tells him what Chris is doing. After the revelation, Lee doesn't speak to Bombhead because he thinks that he stole the missing money. Chris and Freddy Watson (Greg Kelly) frame Lee for the fire at the media lab, which Freddy actually caused. Zara saves Lee when she reveals Freddy's plot to the college council. Lee is angered by this and punches Chris, causing him to be expelled from college along with Zara, Chris and Freddy. Lee develops feelings for Zara and they become close. However, Zara decides to do voluntary work in Thailand. Later, Lee and Zara admit their feelings for each other. In 2005, Lee leaves the village with Zara.

Lee returns to the village in 2010 with his new girlfriend, Leanne Holiday (Jessica Forrest). Lee re-enrolls at Hollyoaks Community College as a mature drama student. He learns that Darren Osborne (Ashley Taylor Dawson) has also enrolled. Darren tells Lee that Steph's cervical cancer is terminal, causing Lee to attempt to avoid her. Steph notices him and they later chat. Lee is shocked when Kevin Smith (Cameron Crighton) tells him that he witnessed Leanne kiss Doug Carter (PJ Brennan). However, he believes Leanne when the group turn against Kevin and accuses him of lying. Lee grows close to Amy Barnes (Ashley Slanina-Davies), after helping her with her college project. After Amy successfully performs her stand-up routine, Lee is shocked when Amy kisses him. Lee admits to Leanne that he kissed Amy, but she forgives him. Lee tells her that he wants to spend the rest of his life with her.

Lee finds a poster asking for directors to put on a production. He cunningly removes the poster and successfully applies for the position. He writes a script for a play named 'MasKara' and casts Jem Costello (Helen Russell-Clark) and Jamil Fadel (Sikander Malik) in the lead roles. Lee also casts Texas Longford (Bianca Hendrickse-Spendlove) Lee tries to hang some decorations for the production and falls off the ladder, hurting his neck. Due to Lee's absence, Steph takes over the production, making drastic changes and hiring Carmel Valentine (Gemma Merna) as the makeup artist. Lee is keen to see what Steph has changed in the production, but is horrified when he sees the costumes and props. He storms off, but then returns to give the production another go; however begins another argument and eventually upsets Steph after cruelly mentioning her cancer. Due to Lee's actions, Jem quits and Lee decides to re-cast the leading part to Amy. On the day of the production, he is forced by the cast members to apologise to Steph and does so. Things however are not sorted, as Darren fails to remember his lines and quits last minute. Lee, with no other options, casts himself as the part that Darren was scheduled to play. The production receives positive feedback from the cheering audience, however Nancy Hayton (Jessica Fox) writes a review which harshly criticises Lee's dictating directing skills.

Lee and Amy remain good friends and eventually Lee admits to Amy he believes he should not be marrying Leanne because he isn't attracted to her anymore. They kiss and fall asleep next to each other, which Leanne witnesses. When she moves the wedding forwards, Lee promises Amy that he's going to dump Leanne for her. However, the situation changes when Amy is hospitalized after being injured in a fire at Il Gnosh restaurant caused by Dominic Reilly (John Pickard). Lee then tells Leanne the news, but she doesn't care and tells him that she wouldn't be upset if Amy dies. Lee then visits Steph's family to give them her farewell CD, as she died in the fire, whilst saving Amy and her children. Amy then makes a life-changing decision to leave Hollyoaks and ends her relationship with Lee. He is devastated, which Leanne exploits in order to grow closer to him in the hope that he will take her back. In January, Amy returns to the village and she and Lee reconcile, and get engaged. When Amy applies for a teaching job, Lee sees her talking to an older man and getting the wrong impression, and angrily confronts him. Lee also becomes jealous when she befriends Dodger Savage (Danny Mac). When Dodger gives her driving lessons and a false driver's licence, Lee reports him to the police but Amy is arrested and fined. After falling out with Lee over this, Amy has a one-night stand with Dodger, but guiltily confesses to Lee later. Lee angrily confronts Dodger and a fight breaks out between them which Amy witnesses. She dumps Lee for his embarrassing actions. After Lee apologizes and forgives her for sleeping with Dodger, he and Amy reconcile and set a date for their wedding.

Lee is offered a job in New York City, which he accepts. He and Amy plan to move there with her children, but Amy's ex-boyfriend Ste Hay (Kieron Richardson), who is the father of her son Lucas (William Hall), finds out about this, he tells them he won't let them take the children. Lee and Amy then invite him to join them in New York, and he accepts their offer, but cannot get a visa due to his criminal record. Consequently, Ste then tells them he doesn't want his children to go, so Lee reluctantly turns down the job offer, much to the shock of Amy and Ste. Amy then buys Lee tickets to New York, so he is able to go. She tells him that she won't be going with him, so Lee leaves on his own in a taxi for the airport.

== Reception ==
In May 2004, Carter won the "Best Comedy Performance" award at the 2004 British Soap Awards for his portrayal of Lee. Carter won the Best Comedic Performance in Soap accolade at the 2004 North West Comedy Awards. He won the award again at the 2005 North West Comedy Awards ceremony. Jon Horsley of Yahoo! said that he would miss Lee after he leaves and said "he’s genuinely funny. His miming of a moustache to mean "must dash" was one of the few things that has made us laugh out loud in soaps."
