= List of Hollyoaks characters introduced in 2000 =

The following is a list of characters that first appeared on the Channel 4 soap opera Hollyoaks in 2000, by first appearance.

== Matt Musgrove ==
Matt Musgrove' played by Kristian Ealey, made his first appearance during the episode broadcast on 5 January 2000. The character was originally introduced into the soap opera Brookside as part of an Irish family, the Musgroves, who arrived on-screen in 1998. Ealey was jobless and claiming benefits when he auditioned for the role. Matthew Citrine, who played the character Brookside character, Bosko also auditioned to play Matt. Producers decided that Ealey was better suited to the role. Ealey made his first appearance as Matt during the Brookside episode broadcast on 11 November 1998.

Brookside producer Paul Marquess wrote the entire Musgrove family out of the show and changed their storylines dramatically. Producers allowed Matt to be transferred into Hollyoaks and it was the first instance of a fictional character being transferred from one British soap to another. He was also the first actor to play the same character in two soaps. An Inside Soap reporter revealed that Ealey had already filmed his first scenes at Hollyoaks and would debut in February 2000. They added that Matt would become a "handyman" at the local college. His main stories in Hollyoaks include a relationship with Chloe Bruce (Mikyla Dodd) and going to prison after committing fraud for the gangster character, Scott Anderson (Daniel Hyde).

== Kenneth “Kenny” Boyd ==
Kenneth Boyd
- Hollyoaks character
- Portrayed by: Greg Wood
- First appearance: 15 March 2000
- Last appearance: 26 October 2000
- Introduced by: Jo Hallows

Kenneth “Kenny” Boyd, played by Greg Wood was a friend of Mark Gibbs (Colin Parry). Wood notably returned to Hollyoaks in 2013 playing a different character, Trevor Royle.

Kenny helped Mark with his feud with Luke Morgan (Gary Lucy) in which they attacked Luke. When Luke tried to break Mark's leg, a car chase ensued where Mark, Kenny and their friend caught up to Luke. They attacked him and pinned him down to his car, but Mark raped Luke and Kenny backed off, horrified. Kenny later was found guilty of rape along with Mark however the judge ruled Kenny to be heavily influenced by Mark's dominated nature and sentenced Kenny to three year imprisonment.

== Victoria Hutchinson ==
Victoria Hutchinson
- Hollyoaks character
- Portrayed by: Fiona Mollison
- Duration: 2000–2001, 2005,
- First appearance: 23 March 2000
- Last appearance: 19 September 2005
- Introduced by: Jo Hallows
In-universe information
- Sisters: Diane Reilly
- Husband: Edward Hutchinson (backstory); Rory Finnigan (2001–02)
- Sons: Tony Hutchinson
- Stepsons: Dominic Reilly
- Grandsons: Beau Ramsey; Harry Thompson; Anthony Hutchinson; Ro Hutchinson
- Granddaughters: Grace Hutchinson; Morgan Osborne; Dee Dee Hutchinson (adoptive)
- Nephews: Dominic Reilly
- Other relatives: Isaac Thompson

Victoria Hutchinson (née Reilly), played by Fiona Mollison, first appears in 2000 before leaving in 2001. She later appeared in 2005. Victoria meets Finn (James Redmond) and begins a relationship with him. She discovers Finn is a friend of her son, Tony Hutchinson (Nick Pickard). Tony is averse to the relationship. Despite this the pair become engaged and soon after marry. After Victoria discovers Finn has cheated the relationship breaks down and the pair divorce. It was announced on 17 October 2025 that Mollison had reprised her role for a guest stint and would return on 21 October for her Son Tony's wedding to Diane

== Lorraine Wilson ==
Lorraine Wilson
- Hollyoaks character
- Portrayed by: Caroline O’Neill (2000); Jo-Anne Knowles (2000)
- First appearance: 23 March 2000
- Last appearance: 21 December 2000
- Introduced by: Jo Hallows
In-universe information
- Occupation: Businesswoman

Lorraine Wilson is a fictional character on the long-running Channel 4 British television soap opera Hollyoaks. She appears throughout 2000 and is played by Jo-Anne Knowles. Lorraine is a night club owner. She meets and befriends Lewis Richardson (Ben Hull). Lewis begins gambling in a casino she owns and after he mounts up a debt she loans him money. She offers Lewis the option to cancel the debt by having sex with her which Lewis agrees to. Lorraine has been described as a "randy older woman" while her storyline with Lewis was described as a "sizzling sex shocker".

== Taylor James ==
Taylor James
- Hollyoaks character
- Portrayed by: Michael Price
- Duration: 2000–2001
- First appearance: 17 April 2000
- Last appearance: 26 April 2001
- Introduced by: Jo Hallows
In-universe information
- Occupation: Student; Journalist

Taylor James, played by Michael Prince, made his first appearance on 17 April 2000. Taylor was a student at Hollyoaks Community College. He worked on the school radio station with Alex Bell, as well as a journalist for The Review. In October 2000, Taylor witnessed a drug deal by Lorraine Wilson's guards at The Loft, and informed Lewis Richardson. Lewis refused to do anything about the situation, resulting in a loud confrontation between the pair. Upon leaving the club, Taylor was followed by the guards and viciously assaulted.

== Jess Holt ==
Jess Holt
- Hollyoaks character
- Portrayed by: Frankie Hough
- Duration: 2000–2001
- First appearance: 19 April 2000
- Last appearance: 5 April 2001
- Introduced by: Jo Hallows
In-universe information
- Occupation: Prostitute; Waitress

Jess Holt, played by Frankie Hough, first appeared in 2000 before leaving in 2001. Actress Helen Noble, who went onto play Abby Davies also auditioned for the role of Jess but was unsuccessful. Part of Jess' characterisation is her trust issues but writers her relationship with Sol Patrick (Paul Danan) to change Jess' life. Hough told Francesca Babb from All About Soap that Jess' trust issues are a result of her past experiences with her brother and pimp, Steve Holt (Conor Ryan). She stated that Sol's support changes this, adding "it's taken her a long time to finally realise that Sol really does care about her. He has also refrained from sleeping with her until now." Hough stated that Jess was "shocked" by Sol's abstinence because Jess believed men only wanted women for sex. Hough opined that Sol and Jess were similar because Sol was homeless "so he knows part of what she is going through." Steve kidnaps Gina which leaves Jess feeling "gutted" and "hates" that her brother is harming Sol's family. She added "if it's possible, the way he treats Gina makes Jess more scared of Steve." Sol's step-father Jack Osborne (Jimmy McKenna) instigates Steve's arrest and Gina is eventually freed. Hough added that despite Steve's actions, "Jess still cares about him because she remembers the way he used to be."

Hough thought that Jess could begin to lead a "normal life" that "she deserves" following Steve's arrest. Jess moves into Sol's flat above The Dog in the Pond pub. She forms a friendship with Jacqui Hudson (Julie Peasgood), Hough revealed that "Jacqui takes Jess under her wing, she sees the child in Jess and really wants to help." She then secures employment at the café, Deva and Hough believed the character "was a natural" at the job. She begins to find it difficult surrounded by many people. Hough revealed that Jess becomes "very nervous" because she is inexperienced but thought she would be fine once "she gets rid of her nerves."

Jess is a prostitute and girlfriend of Sol, who she meets whilst he is homeless, when he helps her escape from her pimp Steve. When Sol moves back to into The Dog in the Pond, he brings Jess with him. Steve finds her and sets the pub on fire, leaving Jess nearly blind. Jess remains living with Sol and Andy (Ross Davidson) and Sue Morgan (Eve White) give Jess a job at their café, Deva. Steve refuses to back down and confronts both Jess and Sol, which escalates when Steve falls off a barge and is knocked unconscious. When Steve recovers from his injuries, he returns for revenge which escalates to Jess pushing him over The Loft balcony. Jess and Sol decide to flee the village to avoid imprisonment over Steve's attack.

Hough died on 13 May 2023, aged 38, while 18 weeks pregnant after being involved in a car accident with her son and nephew.

== Will Davies ==
Will Davies
- Hollyoaks character
- Portrayed by: Billy Geraghty (2000); Barny Clevely (2000–2005)
- Duration: 2000–2005
- First appearance: 21 September 2000
- Last appearance: 12 April 2005
- Introduced by: Jo Hallows
In-universe information
- Occupation: Detective Inspector
- Wife: Alison Davies
- Sons: Ben Davies
- Daughters: Abby Davies
- Grandsons: Arthur Davies

Detective Inspector William "Will" Davies was played by Barny Clevely between 2000 and 2004, with a brief return from 8–11 April 2005.

Will is portrayed as laid back but responsible and supportive to his children Ben and Abby. Will began early on dating Sue Morgan and the relationship seemed to be going reasonably well until Sue decided to return to her husband Andy. Will was devastated as he was deeply in love with her, and on several occasions he tried to persuaded Sue away from Andy, but it did not change her mind. With the help of Ben, Will decided to move on. In Hollyoaks, murders began happening with the targets being young blonde girls and Will was under pressure by the residents of the village after he failed to discover any further leads. In came DCI Dale Jackson, who took over the case and Will got major designs on his colleague, when he asked her to move in with the Davies. Abby was certainly pleased and hoped that Will could find happiness with Dale, but Ben disliked the idea.

One night, Will was left shocked and devastated when he caught Dale and Ben in bed together. An ashamed Ben tried to apologise; however, Will insisted that it really never bothered him and made it clear to Ben that he was free to do anything he wanted. However, another twist emerged when Dale told Will she had feelings for him and the pair began to date, despite Ben’s warnings. Ben was furious at his father's actions and accused Dale of using him, leading Will to throw Ben out of his own house. Eventually, Will and Ben made up, but Will was to face another shock when Dale left after being sacked by the commissioner. Another setback then followed for Will when Ben got Will's assistant officer, Emma Chambers, pregnant. What Ben was unaware of was that Emma had had an affair with Will several years ago when he was married to Ben's mum, which had caused the splitting of his parents. Ben was angry with Will for not telling him, but both father and son made their amends. Will supported his son Ben through his failed marriage with Izzy Cornwell and also supported his daughter Abby through her troubles. Will went on to receive a job offer in London and moved away from Hollyoaks.

Will returned for a visit when Ben's friend Lisa Hunter told him Ben had re-injured his broken leg and had been put back in hospital. During his brief stay, Steph Dean tried to fix him up with her mother, Frankie Osborne. Will thought they were only going to have a friendly dinner with her and her husband Johnno, as he had no idea that Johnno had left her. After dinner, Will said he wouldn't be back in town for some time, and as Frankie apologised, Steph and Craig threw him out under their misguided notion he was abandoning their family just as their father had. The next day, Ben was released from hospital, and told his father to return to London so he wouldn't lose any pay.
