= Kenneth Royce =

English writer (1920–1997)

- Born: Kenneth Royce Gandley; 11 December 1920; Croydon, UK
- Died: 15 August 1997 (aged 76)
- Occupation: Writer

Kenneth Royce Gandley (1920–1997) was an English author. Gandley also wrote under name Ken Royce, and the pseudonym Oliver Jacks.

== Early life ==
Royce was born in Croydon, UK in 1920, and began writing at school. He would buy cheap exercise books and sell them fully illustrated for twice the price. During the Second World War he served with "various regiments" and reached the rank of captain. He ran his own travel business, and made full use of it to gather background for his books.

== Career ==
Royce wrote 36 thriller novels between 1959 and 1997 under his own name (including The Third Arm, The Stalin Account, Fall-Out, 10,000 Days and Channel Assault), and three as Jacks. His best-known works were his novels featuring semi-reformed cat burglar William 'Spider' Scott, an XYY man, whose extra 'Y' chromosome (in the erroneous-but-conventional wisdom of the time) gave him a pre-disposition towards criminality. After attempting to 'go straight', he finds his talents are in demand not only from the criminal underworld, but also the secret service, and he is co-opted into dangerous undercover work (usually through blackmail, the temptations of money, or through his interest being piqued).

A television series of The XYY Man in 1976-7 (adapting the early books) created a popular appetite for the character, and also that of his nemesis, Detective Sergeant George Bulman, a relatively minor character in the original books, but brought to life on the screen by the memorable performance of Don Henderson. After the run of Spider Scott programmes ended, the character of Bulman had many television adventures not based on Royce's work (the series Strangers, 1978–82, and Bulman, 1985-7). The popularity of these probably contributed to Royce choosing to make Scott and Bulman unlikely allies and joint leads from The Crypto Man through No Way Back, while he wrote more Bulman novels towards the end of his life, including The Judas Trail (1996) and Shadows (1996).

Royce was married and lived in Buckinghamshire, UK. He died in 1997.

== Bibliography ==
=== William "Spider" Scott/George Bulman novels ===
- The XYY Man (1970)
- Concrete Boot (1971)
- The Miniatures Frame (1972)
- Spider Underground (The Masterpiece Affair) (1973)
- Trap Spider (1974)
- The Satan Touch (1980)
- The Crypto Man (1984)
- The Mosley Receipt (1985).
- No Way Back, a.k.a. Hashimi's Revenge (1986 - a direct sequel to The Mosley Receipt).
- The Judas Trail (1996)
- Shadows (1996)

== TV adaptations ==
- The XYY Man (1976-1977)
- Strangers (1978-1982)
- Bulman (1985-1987)
