= Dennis Blanch =

English actor (born 1947)

- Born: 4 February 1947 (age 79); Barnet, Hertfordshire, England
- Education: Mountview Theatre School
- Occupation: Actor
- Years active: 1970-
- Spouse: Carol Wilks (married in 1988)

Dennis Blanch (born 4 February 1947) is an English actor. He is best known for portrayal of DC/DS Derek Willis in the crime drama television series The XYY Man and its spin-off Strangers.

== Life and career ==
Blanch born 4 February 1947 in Barnet, Hertfordshire and trained at Mountview Theatre School.

Blanch appeared in stage productions such as Bob Graham's Cartoons, Tudor Gates's The Dream of Geronimous Bosch and John Arden's Serjeant Musgrave’s Dance.

He began his TV career in 1970, appearing in such popular programmes as Dad's Army, Upstairs, Downstairs, The Sweeney, The New Avengers, Van der Valk, Grange Hill, Minder, Casualty, Heartbeat, The Bill, Coronation Street and more recently Brassic. He first played Detective Constable Derek Willis in The XYY Man (1976–1977), then reprised the role in the spin-off Strangers (1978–1982), where his character was promoted to detective sergeant. He returned as a guest star as Det. Sgt. Derek Willis in Strangers spin-off Bulman (1985), starring former co-star Don Henderson. Other prominent work includes the role of Michael Brady in the sixth series of How We Used To Live, as well as the roles of Derek Warner (1985–1986) and Jim Latimer (1991) in the soap opera Emmerdale.

== Selected filmography ==
- Who Killed Lamb (1974) TV Movie
- Permission to Kill (1975)
- The Naked Civil Servant (1975) TV Movie
- The Spy Who Loved Me (1977)
- International Velvet (1978)
- The Smiths (1995) TV Movie
- Hillsborough (1996) TV Movie
- The Full Monty (1997)
- Lost for Words (1999) TV Movie
- The Marchioness Disaster (2007) TV Movie
- The Caravan (2015)
