= Murray Smith (writer) =

British screenwriter (1940–2003)

Murray Smith (14 June 1940 – 28 December 2003) was a British film and television writer and producer.

He created/wrote a number of British films and TV shows, including the ITV series The XYY Man, Strangers and Bulman. Smith also wrote scripts for TV series including The Sweeney, Minder, and Dempsey and Makepeace, and wrote two novels.

Smith wrote five screenplays for British exploitation director Pete Walker.

== Filmography ==
=== Film ===
Year	Title	Role
1970	Cool it Carol!	Writer
1971	Die Screaming, Marianne	Writer
1972	Four Dimensions of Greta	Writer
1978	The Comeback	Co-writer
1979	Home Before Midnight	Co-writer

=== Television ===
Year	Title	Role	Notes
1970	Confession	Writer	Episode - "Just as the Sun Was Rising"
1975	The Sweeney	Writer	Episode - "Faces"
1977	The Mackinnons	Writer	Episode - "Money Matters"
1977	The XYY Man	Writer	3 Episodes - "When We Were Very Greedy", "Now We Are Dead", "Whisper Who Dares"
1978–1982	Strangers	Creator/Writer	Creator/Writer (18 episodes)
1979	Hazell	Writer	Episode - "Hazell and the Public Enemy"
1979	Minder	Writer	Episode - "A Tethered Goat"
1980	Hammer House of Horror	Writer	Screenplay - "Children of the Full Moon"
1980	Closing Ranks	Writer	TV movie
1983	Chessgame	Writer	4 Episodes - "Flying Blind", "Cold Wargame", "Enter Hassan", "The Alamut Ambush"
1984	Cold Warrior	Writer	4 Episodes - "Bright Sting", "Dead Wrong", "The Man from Damascus", "Hook, Link and Sinker"
1985–1986	Dempsey and Makepeace	Writer	4 Episodes - "Wheelman", "The Hit", "The Prizefighter", "Mantrap"
1985–1987	Bulman	Writer	15 Episodes
1986	Lovejoy	Writer	Episode - "The March of Time"
1986	Philip Marlowe, Private Eye	Writer	Episode - "Pickup on Noon Street"
1986	The Alamut Ambush	Writer	TV movie
1986	Cold War Killers	Writer	TV movie - screenplay
1989–1990	The Paradise Club	Creator/Writer	Creator/Writer (16 episodes)
1989–1990	Frederick Forsyth Presents	Writer	Script - "A Casualty of War"/ Writer - "Death Has a Bad Reputation", "The Price of the Bride"
1989	Just Another Secret	Writer	TV movie
1990	A Little Piece of Sunshine	Writer	TV movie
1999	Extremely Dangerous	Writer	4 Episodes
