= The Paradise Club =

Television series

- Title card
- Genre: Crime drama
- Created by: Murray Smith
- Written by: Murray Smith; Russell Murray; Michael Aitkins; Jeremy Burnham; Susan Boyd; Barry Purchase
- Starring: Don Henderson; Leslie Grantham; Leon Herbert; Barbara Wilshere; Peter Gowen; Nick Dawney; Annie Scott-Horne
- Theme music composer: Dave Lawson
- Country of origin: United Kingdom
- Original language: English
- No. of series: 2
- No. of episodes: 20

Production
- Executive producer: Archie Tait
- Producer: Selwyn Roberts
- Cinematography: Alan Jones
- Editor: John S. Smith
- Running time: 50 minutes
- Production company: Zenith Entertainment

Original release
- Network: BBC1
- Release: 19 September 1989 – 27 November 1990

The Paradise Club is a BBC television crime drama series, broadcast between 19 September 1989 and 27 November 1990. The series starred Don Henderson and Leslie Grantham as Frank and Danny Kane, siblings who inherit a nightclub from their mother, Ma Kane, a matriarch of a criminal South London gang, after she tragically dies. At the start of the series, Frank is working as a priest but decides to return to London to steer his brother Danny away from crime. The series featured a large supporting cast, with Bruce Dickinson of Iron Maiden notably making an appearance in the episode "Rock and Roll Roulette". A total of 20 episodes were broadcast over the course of two series. The first two episodes of the first series were partly filmed in Broadway Market on the edge of Hackney, the location was apparently chosen for its authentic London character. Around the time of original broadcast, there was some criticism for possible negative stereotyping of ethnic minorities in the series.

The series has never officially been released on DVD, due to issues surrounding clearance rights for the music used. The series is available on YouTube. Notably, the series has yet to be repeated on any of the BBC's co-owned free-to-air digital channels, such as UK Gold or UKTV Drama (it has been aired on UK Gold). However, both series are available to purchase from Amazon, but these are VHS to DVD transfers of the original broadcast, in varying quality. A soundtrack album of music featured in the series was also released in 1989, and was available on CD, LP and Cassette.

== Cast ==
- Don Henderson as Frank Kane (Series 1–2)
- Leslie Grantham as Danny Kane (Series 1–2)
- Leon Herbert as Polish Joe (Series 1–2)
- Barbara Wilshere as Carol Kane (Series 1–2)
- Peter Gowen as Jonjo O'Brady (Series 1–2)
- Kevin Williams as Ronnie Blythe (Series 1–2)
- Nick Dawney as Terry Kane (Series 1–2)
- Annie Scott-Horne as Samantha Kane (Series 1–2)
- Jack Galloway as DS Jack Nesbitt (Series 2)
- Nigel Harrison as DS Fielding (Series 1)
- Thomas Craig as DC Lambton (Series 1)
- Frederick Warder as DCS Graham (Series 1)
- Pete Lee-Wilson as DC Milligan (Series 1)
- Kitty Aldridge as DI Rosy Campbell (Series 1)
- David Swift as Max Wartbug (Series 1–2)
- Caroline Bliss as DI Sarah Turnbull (Series 1)
- Phillip Martin Brown as Peter Noonan (Series 1)
- James Saxon as DI Fairweather (Series 1)

=== Supporting cast ===
- Freddie Earlle as Walter Trafficante (Series 1; three episodes)
- Ian Lindsay as DCS Torrance (Series 1; three episodes)
- Oona Kirsch as WDC Tilly Spink (Series 2; three episodes)
- Robert Perkins as DC Benson (Series 2; three episodes)
- Grant Thoburn as DC Ian Cornwall (Series 2; three episodes)
- David Ryall as Bishop Sykes (Series 1–2; three episodes)
- Philip Bretherton as DI Don Wright (Series 1; two episodes)
- Ben Daniels as DC Webster (Series 1; two episodes)
- Ken Drury as DCS George Gibson (Series 1; two episodes)
- Michael Fenner as DC Dave Hutton (Series 1; two episodes)

== Episodes ==
=== Series 1 (1989) ===
No.	Title	Directed by	Written by	British air date
1	"Unfrocked in Babylon"	Lawrence Gordon Clark	Murray Smith	19 September 1989
When their criminal mother dies, a streetwise priest and a reluctant villain, estranged brothers, are reunited again and wonder who will get the Paradise Club.
2	"Family Favours"	Anthony Wilkinson	Murray Smith	26 September 1989
As Frank settles in at the Paradise Club, Danny's would-be assassins are on trial for attempted murder, and the outrageous Great Crane Robbery seals the fate of Glasgow gangster Elliot Rossini.
3	"Sudden Death Tango"	Anthony Wilkinson	Murray Smith	3 October 1989
A police plan to foil a major gem heist goes tragically wrong and Danny convinces a young would-be armed robber that a life of crime leads to misery.
4	"Crack in the Mirror"	Richard Standeven	Murray Smith	10 October 1989
Frank tries to trace a missing teenager and Danny takes explosive action to prevent a ruthless drug baron from pushing crack and heroin.
5	"Bring on the Cavalry"	Lawrence Gordon Clark	Michael Aitkins	17 October 1989
Danny is arrested but confounds his lawyer by refusing to provide an alibi for a crime he did not commit, leaving Frank to take on vicious drug dealer Colonel Mombassa.
6	"Up Jumped a Swagperson"	Lawrence Gordon Clark	Murray Smith	24 October 1989
Ma Kane's ghost appears to haunt the Kane brothers, while the hunt for cop-killer Peter Noonan intensifies.
7	"Short Story"	Richard Standeven	Murray Smith	31 October 1989
Danny suspects that his wife and his minder are having an affair.
8	"Revolving Funds"	Richard Standeven	Jeremy Burnham	7 November 1989
Frank gets involved with a crooked gambler and Danny launders dirty money.
9	"Sins of the Father (Part 1)"	Gabrielle Beaumont	Murray Smith	14 November 1989
Special Branch want to keep Danny on the wrong side of the law and the right side of a sinister organisation.
10	"Sins of the Father (Part 2)"	Gabrielle Beaumont	Murray Smith	21 November 1989
Sarah Turnbull blackmails Danny into staging a daring robbery, intending to double cross him at the last minute. Only Frank can save him, but can he do it in time?

=== Series 2 (1990) ===
No.	Title	Directed by	Written by	British air date
1	"Chinese Whispers"	Colin Gregg	Murray Smith	25 September 1990
When Frank foils the escape of one of Wally Fagan's men during a bank raid, he calls on Danny to make amends. When the prisoner makes his own escape from the police Danny is left with repaying the money Wally lost, closely watched by the Flying Squad. As Danny and bodyguard Jonjo plan a 'job' to raise the money, Frank has plans of his own and finally wins the money in a Chinese game of chance.
2	"Hell's Kitchenette"	Colin Gregg	Murray Smith	2 October 1990
The Inland Revenue are after Danny for £284,000 back tax on undeclared income – can he find the money and meet the deadline?
3	"Faces from the Past"	Derek Banham	Russell Murray	9 October 1990
While Frank rekindles a romance, Danny deals with a vicious ex-convict, Albert Styles
4	"The Great Fly Tipping War"	Derek Banham	Jeremy Burnham	16 October 1990
Kiddie porn is being transported through the Kane manor, much to Danny's anger. Meanwhile, renovations to the Paradise Club leads to two fly-tippers taking a shortcut in disposing of its rubbish-leading another gangland leader, Mad Max Wheeler, to think that the Kanes are leaving a calling card.
5	"Old Pals"	Renny Rye	Susan Boyd	23 October 1990
Harry Vincent, a former schoolmate of Danny and Carol Kane, interests Danny in property investment in Africa. However, he has more sinister motives. Frank is holding a drag queen night at the Paradise Club, which brings him into contact with a call girl who has been beaten up by a client.
6	"Lord of the Files"	Selwyn Roberts	Murray Smith	30 October 1990
A computer expert is murdered in broad daylight, but suspicions soon surface that he was the wrong man. Attempts on Danny Kane's life seem to indicate that he is a target.
7	"Rock and Roll Roulette"	Renny Rye	Russell Murray	6 November 1990
The music industry has more villainy than the Kane brothers expect, as a record label plays dirty in trying to get back one of its artists from the Paradise Club.
8	"The Rotherhithe Project"	Brian Ward	Barry Purchase	13 November 1990
Danny is asked to invest in new property development in Rotherhithe, though it soon becomes apparent that the earlier owners have been forced to sell. The finger is pointed at the Kane firm.
9	"Snow Business"	Ken Hannam	Murray Smith	20 November 1990
A hard-drug deal goes wrong and the wheel man, shot by the police, finds himself in Frank's care. However, Frank learns that the driver is in fact an undercover detective. Danny is offered a share in the deal.
10	"Dead Dogs Don't Bark"	Ken Hannam	Murray Smith	27 November 1990
At the suggestion of the local Rabbi, Delia Rich, health club owner asks Danny and Frank to act as private detectives to prevent her husband Ronnie being arrested for a major art theft. While Frank and Polish Joe earn a £5000 bonus for getting Ronnie safely out of the country, Danny can't resist carrying through the theft for himself.
