= Abby Davies =

Soap opera character

- Hollyoaks character
- Portrayed by: Helen Noble
- Duration: 2001–2005
- First appearance: 1 March 2001
- Last appearance: 10 February 2005
- Introduced by: Jo Hallows
In-universe information
- Occupation: Student
- Father: Will Davies
- Mother: Alison Davies
- Brothers: Ben Davies
- Nephews: Arthur Davies

Abby Davies is a fictional character from the British soap opera Hollyoaks, played by Helen Noble. The character made her first on-screen appearance during the episode broadcast on 1 March 2001. Noble remained a part of the cast until her character departed in June 2004. She reprised her role for a guest return on 7 February 2005, departing again a few days later.

== Casting ==
Helen Noble was seventeen when she joined the cast of Hollyoaks after auditioning for the role. Noble originally auditioned for the role of Jess Holt but was unsuccessful. Producers later contacted Noble and asked her to audition for the role of Abby instead. Noble made her first on-screen appearance as Abby during the episode broadcast on 1 March 2001.

== Development ==
Abby is an enthusiast and has high hopes in her life. Speaking of Abby's persona during an interview with OK! Noble stated: "My character Abby Davies was such a fun character, very likeable, very girlie, a little bit ditzy and silly. She had a big imagination and she had very high hopes for herself and her love life." Abby has a unique style but Noble disliked it. She told a reporter from Inside Soap that "[she] is supposed to be a goth/punky kind of person and she used to wear dog collars – but I think they're really ugly. They're for dogs, not people. And if we're filming, and I have to have this heavy studded thing on all day, it gets really uncomfortable! Abby's style is just not me at all." Noble told an All About Soap reporter that Abby is a "typical teenage girl with lots of attitude." She added that Abby likes to wear a lot of make-up and is "a bit of a goth" like her friend Zara Morgan (Kelly Greenwood). Noble described Abby as very different which made her challenging to play. Eventually Abby began to change her appearance. Noble told Kathryn Secretan from Soaplife that Abby's "fashion sense used to be horrible. She used to dress like a punk and I hated it."

Abby is introduced as a member of the Davies family consisting of her brother, Ben Davies (Marcus Patric) and their father, Will Davies (Barny Clevely). Noble revealed that Abby is "not at all" like Ben, who is more interested in "staying in his dad's good books" and refuses to side with Abby on family issues. They were both introduced before Abby and in her backstory, she had been living with her mother. Noble added that most of Abby's initial scenes are with Zara, Will and Ben so she quickly formed a good rapport with the actors. Noble was hopeful that Abby would continue to cause trouble in the series because she had been enjoying acting out those stories. She added "the funny thing is she always gets found out."

Writers created a relationship storyline between Abby and fellow student, Lee (Alex Carter). Their relationship is tested when Abby leaves Chester to study at Brighton University. Lee remains in Hollyoaks and decides to take a beautician college course at the local campus. The pair also become engaged to marry, but a long-distance relationship begins to cause problems. Carter told reporters from All About Soap that "Lee is definitely missing Abby. Well, you would, they've just got engaged." Lee sends Abby text messages but she does not reply and Carter explained that Lee assumes that Abby is cheating on him. When Abby finally makes contact with Lee, their friend Zara interferes and asks Abby how many new men she has met. Zara tries to cheer Lee up, but he cannot stop thinking about Abby. Carter said that viewers would soon tire of his character's whining about Abby.

Writers developed a consistent friendship between Abby and Zara, with the two often sharing storylines. Noble told Dorothy Koomson from All About Soap that Abby was always protecting Zara but was unafraid to tell her when she was in the wrong. Writers even played the story so that Zara moves into the Davies household, further cementing their bond. Greenwood described Zara as the sister Abby never had and they became closer once living together. She added that Zara was always Abby's confidant especially when she was upset about her mother. Their friendship was tested when Zara has sex with Abby's ex-boyfriend, Lee. Noble stated that Abby would not believe Zara could betray her in such a way but it did not mean the end of their friendship. Noble concluded that the characters would be forever bonded because they "have grown up together and have been through a lot." Greenwood added that Abby and Zara do not agree on much, but that is the "spark in a friendship" that writers gave them.

Writers also featured Abby in the show's serial killer storyline. In the episode broadcast on 18 February 2002, Abby goes missing. Her father Will fears that Abby has become another victim of the killer. Abby is found safe and taken into a police incident room. Abby is left disturbed after she accidentally views photographs of one of the murder victims. Abby's brother Ben blames DCI Dale Jackson (Laila Rouass) and confronts her for scaring Abby.

Noble decided to leave Hollyoaks in 2004, but agreed to return in four episodes in 2005. Noble stated that she felt she had changed and was confident in her decision to depart.

== Storylines ==
Will's daughter and Ben's younger sister Abby was the school friend of Lisa Hunter, Lee, Zara, Cameron Clark, and Norman Sankofa. Abby's main storylines involved her tempestuous relationship with Lee. No matter how many times they broke up, Abby could always be won back by Lee quoting Romeo and Juliet, though this didn't stop her almost starting a relationship with Craig Dean. Lee finally asked Abby to marry him shortly before she left Hollyoaks to go to university in Brighton, but alas, it was not to be. When she stopped calling, Lee executed a surprise visit, only to find her in bed with someone else. Abby was last mentioned in October 2007, when Steph Dean complained about still living in Chester while Abby was living in the more glamorous Los Angeles.

== Reception ==
Lorna Cooper of MSN TV listed Abby of one of Soap Opera's "forgotten characters" and that she is mainly remembered for her "turbulent relationship with Lee Hunter". Virgin Media said that the "ever-bubbly and ditzy" was an "absolute sucker" for Lee, adding that their relationship status seemed more on/off than a "faulty light switch". Dorothy Koomson (All About Soap) branded Abby and Zara as a "feisty" duo who shared an "intense" living arrangement, considering their friendship "potential pitfall" was Zara having sex with Lee.
