= Sean Tait =

Sean Tait may refer to:

- Shaun Tait, cricketer
- Sean Tate, Hollyoaks character
