= Carmen du Sautoy =

British stage, television and film actor (born 1950)

- Born: 26 February 1950 (age 75); London, England
- Occupation: Actress
- Years active: 1972–present
- Spouse: Charles Savage (m. 1974)
- Website: Official website

Carmen du Sautoy (born 26 February 1950) is a British stage, television and film actress.

== Early life ==
Du Sautoy was born in London. She has played a wide variety of leading roles with the Royal Shakespeare Company, Royal National Theatre, in London's West End, and in New York, Tokyo, Sydney, Madrid, Berlin and in many other major theatres worldwide.

== Career ==
Du Sautoy may be best known to film audiences for her role as the belly-dancing Lebanese temptress Saida in the 1974 James Bond film The Man with the Golden Gun. She has had an extensive television career with numerous starring roles in amongst others Lost Empires, Poor Little Rich Girl, La Ronde, The Citadel, The Orchid House, A Dance to the Music of Time, Chessgame, Midsomer Murders, Hammer House of Horror, Absolutely Fabulous, and The South Bank Show.

== Personal life ==
Du Sautoy married theatre director and writer Charles Savage in 1974.

== Films ==
- The Man with the Golden Gun (1974) – Saida
- It Couldn't Happen Here (1987)
- Poor Little Rich Girl: The Barbara Hutton Story (1987) – Roussie (Isabelle Roussadana Mdivani)
- Bert Rigby, You're a Fool (1989) – Tess Trample
- Paparazzo (1995) – Marjorie
- Dream (2001) – Compere at audition
- Method (2004) – Mother (Mona)
- Royally Ever After (2018) – Queen Patricia

== Television ==
- The Brothers (1976) – Ika
- Astronauts (TV series) (1981–1983) – Dr. Gentian Foster
- The Barretts of Wimpole Street (1982) – Arabel Barrett
- Praying Mantis (1983) – Vera Canova
- The Citadel (1983) – Frances Lawrence
- Chessgame (1983) – Faith Steerforth
- Strangers and Brothers (1984) – Ann Simon / Ann March
- Hammer House of Mystery and Suspense (1984) – Suzy Kendrick
- Lost Empires (1986) – Julie Blane
- Bergerac (1988) – Marie Chantel
- Agatha Christie's Poirot (1989) – Mrs. Vanderlyn
- Perfect Scoundrels (1990) – Eva Sanderson
- The Orchid House (1991) – Mamselle the Tutor
- Boon (1991) – Ann Fielding
- Bugs (1995) – Irene Campbell
- Kavanagh QC (1996) – Marcia Jacobs
- Absolutely Fabulous (1996) – Kalishia Klegg Ferruzzi
- Highlander (1997) – Anna Hidalgo
- A Dance to the Music of Time (1997) – Miss Weedon
- Heartbeat (1998) – Dorothea Cliveden
- Midsomer Murders (2002) – Rosalind Parr
- Ultimate Force (2002) – Mrs. Leonard
- Doctors (2003–2006) – Linda Larchmont / Stella Dale
- The Line of Beauty (2006) – Elena
- The Worst Week of My Life (2006) – Daphne
- Hughie Green, Most Sincerely (2008) – Christina Sharples

== Stage ==
- The Comedy of Errors, The Courtesan, Royal Shakespeare Company, Aldwych Theatre London, The Courtesan
- Troilus and Cressida, Royal Shakespeare Company, Aldwych Theatre London, Cassandra
- The Way of the World, Royal Shakespeare Company, Aldwych Theatre London, Mrs Fainall
- Love's Labour's Lost, Royal Shakespeare Company, Stratford/Aldwych Theatre London, The Princess of France
- Pillars of the Community, Royal Shakespeare Company, Aldwych Theatre London, Mrs Lynge
- A Midsummer Night's Dream, Royal Shakespeare Company, Stratford/Aldwych Theatre London, Hippolyta
- Captain Swing, Royal Shakespeare Company, Stratford/Warehouse Theatre London, Lady Cummings
- Piaf, Royal Shakespeare Company, Stratford, Madeleine
- Children of the Sun, Royal Shakespeare Company, Aldwych Theatre London, Eliena
- Once in a Lifetime, Royal Shakespeare Company, Stratford/Aldwych Theatre London/Piccadilly Theatre London, Miss Leighton
- Macbeth, Old Vic Tour, USA, Lady Macbeth
- Antony and Cleopatra, Mermaid Theatre London, Cleopatra
- Desire Under the Elms, Greenwich Theatre London, Abbie
- Candy Kisses, Bush Theatre London, Bobby
- Peace in Our Time, UK Tour, Lyia Vivian
- Facade, London Symphony Orchestra, Wind Harmonie, Queen Elizabeth Hall London, Narrator
- Hay Fever, Albery Theatre London, Myra
- Salome, Royal National Theatre London/Phoenix Theatre London/BAM Theatre New York/World Tour, Herodias
- Mind Millie For Me, Haymarket Theatre London, Countess Irene
- The Importance of Being Earnest, Ambassador Theatre Group National Tour UK, Gwendoline/Maria

== Awards and nominations ==
- Won the London Theatre Critics' Award 1979 for Best Supporting Actress for her performance in Once in a Lifetime
- Nominated for the Laurence Olivier Theatre Award 1979 for Best Supporting Actress for her performance in Once in a Lifetime
