= Ken Grieve =

Scottish television director (1942–2016)

- Born: Kenneth Alan Grieve; 17 March 1942; Edinburgh, Scotland
- Died: 15 November 2016 (aged 74); Edinburgh, Scotland
- Occupation: Director
- Spouse: Fiona Grieve (died 2010)
- Partner: Jane
- Children: 4

Kenneth Alan Grieve (17 March 1942 – 15 November 2016) was a Scottish television director. Originally a cameraman, he moved into directing and began his career with Coronation Street.

== Early life and education ==
Grieve was born and brought up in Edinburgh, the son of Henry Grieve, a plant manager at British Aluminium, and his wife, Lesley, a seamstress. He also had an older brother named Robin. He attended the Edinburgh Academy, where he excelled in geography and history, and won a scholarship to Bryanston School in Dorset.

== Career ==
His first job was as a trainee studio cameraman with Granada Television. He became one of its elite crew, strong and skilled enough to manoeuvre the huge cameras on live pop shows. He later further trained as a director of dramas and documentaries, working on Coronation Street and Crown Court in the mid-1970s. He subsequently directed the 1979 Doctor Who serial Destiny of the Daleks for the BBC, and episodes of The Bill and Peak Practice. In 1988, he shared the direction of Game, Set and Match with Patrick Lau. In 2007, he directed the Casualty episode Stormy Weather.

== Other work ==
In 1975, he directed the location footage of Coronation Street that was used for the opening titles until 1990. He recorded a commentary for the DVD of Destiny of the Daleks with actors Lalla Ward and David Gooderson, which was released in 2007.

== Personal life ==
Grieve had four children with his wife, Fiona. They remained together until her death in 2010.

Through working with Douglas Adams on Destiny of the Daleks, they struck up a friendship that would last Adams' lifetime.

In the mid 1990s, Grieve returned to base himself in Edinburgh and lived in Marchmont. In 2009 he was diagnosed with myeloma and had to withdraw from a film production with Hugh Laurie. He mentored young aspiring film makers at the Edinburgh Filmhouse's youth film group Scottish Kids Are Making Movies (SKAMM). He died in Edinburgh on 15 November 2016.

== Television ==
Year	Title	Notes
1974 - 1983	Coronation Street	(Various Episodes)
	Crown Court	
(?)	The Bill	(Various Episodes)
1976	The XYY Man	
	Strangers	
	Bulman	
1979	Doctor Who : Destiny of the Daleks	
1979	The Omega Factor	
1980	Buccaneer	
1983	Chessgame	
1985	The Adventures of Sherlock Holmes	"The Norwood Builder"
1988	Game, Set and Match	
1990	Bergerac	"Entente Cordiale" and "Diplomatic Incident"
1992	Moon and Son	"Star of Fortune", "GI Joe Is Missing"
1993	Agatha Christie's Poirot	"Jewel Robbery at the Grand Metropolitan", "The Chocolate Box"
1995	Bugs	Five Episodes
1997	Peak Practice	
1997 - 1998	Cadfael	"The Raven in the Foregate", "The Holy Thief" and "The Pilgrim of Hate"
2005	The Royal	"It's What's on the Inside that Counts", "Dutybound"
2007	Casualty	"Stormy Weather"
2010	Law and Order:UK	"Community Service"
