= The XYY Man =

British television series

William "Spider" Scott
- 'The XYY Man' character
- First appearance: The XYY Man
- Last appearance: The Mosley Receipt
- Created by: Kenneth Royce
- Portrayed by: Stephen Yardley

In-universe information
- Alias: The XYY Man
- Gender: Male
- Occupation: Criminal
- Nationality: British

The XYY Man is a series which began in 1970 as a series of novels by Kenneth Royce, featuring the character of William "Spider" Scott, a one-time cat-burglar who leaves prison aiming to go straight. Adapted for television, The XYY Man was broadcast on Granada Television in the United Kingdom in 1976 and 1977.

In the series, the main character Scott finds his talents still to be very much in demand by both the criminal underworld and the British secret service. He has an extra Y chromosome that supposedly gives him a criminal predisposition – although he tries to go straight, he is genetically incapable of doing so.

Royce's original books were: The XYY Man (1970); Concrete Boot (1971); The Miniatures Frame (1972); Spider Underground (The Masterpiece Affair) (1973) and Trap Spider (1974), though he returned to the character in the 80s with The Crypto Man (1984) and The Mosley Receipt (1985).

Regular characters included Scott's long-suffering girlfriend Maggie Parsons; British secret service head codenamed Fairfax (the character's real name is Sir Stuart Halliman. In one episode, Fairfax identifies himself as 'Stuart' in a telephone conversation); Detective Sergeant George Bulman, the tenacious policeman who wants to see Scott back behind bars; journalist Ray Lynch; gay photographer Bluey Palmer; and KGB chief Kransouski.

== The XYY Man — The TV Series ==
The XYY Man
- Genre: Crime drama
- Created by: Kenneth Royce
- Written by: Ivor Marshall; Tim Aspinall; Murray Smith; Edward Boyd
- Directed by: Ken Grieve; Carol Wilks; Alan Grint
- Starring: Stephen Yardley; Don Henderson; Dennis Blanch; Vivienne McKee; Mark Dignam; Oliver Maguire; Johnny Shannon; Brian Croucher; Fiona Curzon; William Squire
- Composer: Mike Moran
- Country of origin: United Kingdom
- Original language: English
- No. of series: 2
- No. of episodes: 13

Production
- Producer: Richard Everitt
- Cinematography: David Wood; Ray Goode
- Editors: Anthony Ham; Tony Smith; Brian Tagg
- Running time: 60 minutes
- Production company: Granada Television

Original release
- Network: ITV
- Release: 3 July 1976 – 29 August 1977

Related
- Strangers

In 1976 the first of Royce's novels was adapted for British television by Ivor Marshall. The series ran for three episodes, which covered the one storyline with Stephen Yardley starring as the main character. Co-starring were Mark Dignam as shadowy civil-servant and MI5 officer Fairfax, Don Henderson as his nemesis DS George Bulman and Dennis Blanch as Bulman's assistant, DC Derek Willis. The series, produced by Granada Television, was successful enough for a second series of ten episodes, containing original stories written for television, to follow in 1977. Both series were released as a complete box set via the Network imprint on 26 February 2007.

Although the television adaptation openly depicts a person with XYY syndrome as having criminal tendencies, it was highlighted following the series' broadcast that in real life, there is no connection. An early academic paper studying the conditional probability fallacy resulted in the myth becoming conventional wisdom in the 1970s, but subsequent research has not found any evidence for it. The subject was also touched on in an episode of Doomwatch, "By the Pricking of My Thumbs...", written by Robin Chapman.

When the series came to an end, the characters of Bulman and Willis were considered popular enough to merit their own spin-off series, Strangers, which followed in 1978. Five series of Strangers were broadcast, before a second and final spin-off series, Bulman, followed in 1985. The popularity of the character of Bulman resulted in Kenneth Royce writing three further novels featuring the character: No Way Back (Hashimi's Revenge) in 1986, and later The Judas Trail (1996) and Shadows (1996).

== Cast ==
- Stephen Yardley as William 'Spider' Scott
- Don Henderson as DS George Bulman
- Dennis Blanch as DC Derek Willis
- Vivienne McKee as Maggie Parsons
- Mark Dignam as Fairfax (Series 1 & Series 2, Episodes 4—8)
- Oliver Maguire as Don Stevens (Series 2, Episodes 1—5 & 9)
- Johnny Shannon as Warren (Series 1, Episode 1 & Series 2, Episodes 1—4)
- Brian Croucher as Raisen (Series 2, Episodes 1—4)
- Fiona Curzon as Penny (Series 2, Episodes 1—4)
- William Squire as Laidlaw (Series 2, Episodes 1—4)

== Episodes ==
=== Series 1 (1976) ===
No. overall	No. in series	Title	Directed by	Written by	Original release date
1	1	"The Proposition"	Ken Grieve	Ivor Marshall	3 July 1976
Cat burglar Spider Scott is released from prison and wants to go straight. A British Intelligence officer called Fairfax has other ideas though and wants to use Spider's talents to retrieve an incriminating photograph.
2	2	"The Execution"	Ken Grieve	Ivor Marshall	10 July 1976
Spider finds himself on the run from foreign agents, who are also after the photograph which they plan to use for their political ends.
3	3	"The Resolution"	Ken Grieve	Ivor Marshall	17 July 1976
Spider decides to take Fairfax on at his own game and offers to sell the photograph to rival foreign agents, unaware just how high the stakes are and that his own life is in danger.

=== Series 2 (1977) ===
No. overall	No. in series	Title	Directed by	Written by	Original release date
4	1	"Friends and Enemies"	Ken Grieve	Tim Aspinall	27 June 1977
Spider buys a half-share of an executive aircraft charter company. One of his first customers is an old acquaintance from his criminal past, then one of his old friends turns up dead.
5	2	"The Missing Civil Servant"	Ken Grieve	Tim Aspinall	4 July 1977
Reisen brings pressure to bear on Spider.
6	3	"The Big Bang"	Ken Grieve	Tim Aspinall	11 July 1977
Spider plays along with the scheme to smuggle a man out of the country, unaware that he is being set up as a decoy for a deadly international operation.
7	4	"At the Bottom of the River"	Ken Grieve	Tim Aspinall	18 July 1977
Spider is implicated in robbery and murder, and finds Laidlaw and Bulman are both on his tail.
8	5	"When We Were Very Greedy"	Carol Wilks	Murray Smith	25 July 1977
Spider is invited to serve on a committee investigating prison conditions, but is soon asked to resign by the committee chairman.
9	6	"Now We Are Dead"	Carol Wilks	Murray Smith	1 August 1977
Spider is convinced that the police were tipped off about the break-in. He attempts to get close to Thresher's daughter, but soon finds his life under threat.
10	7	"Whisper Who Dares"	Carol Wilks	Murray Smith	8 August 1977
Spider seeks out a criminal who threatened his girlfriend.
11	8	"Law and Order"	Alan Grint	Edward Boyd	15 August 1977
Spider, facing a murder charge, agrees to go back to prison to carry out a job for Fairfax – helping another prisoner to escape.
12	9	"The Detrimental Robot"	Alan Grint	Edward Boyd	22 August 1977
Spider goes on the run with his fellow escapee, but it isn't only the police who are in pursuit.
13	10	"A View to a Death"	Alan Grint	Edward Boyd	29 August 1977
Spider is released from custody, but only so he can help capture an enemy agent.
