= Mark Dignam =

English actor (1909–1989)

- in The Saint (1968)
- Born: Cuthbert Mark Dignam; 20 March 1909; Ealing, London, England
- Died: 29 September 1989 (aged 80); London, England
- Occupation: Actor

Cuthbert Mark Dignam (20 March 1909 – 29 September 1989) was an English actor.

Born in London, the son of a salesman in the steel industry, Dignam grew up in Sheffield, and was educated at the Jesuit College, where he appeared in numerous Shakespearean plays.

He learned his craft touring Britain and America with Ben Greet's Shakespeare company. His range extended from the Louis Macneice radio play, The Dark Tower in the 1940s to the TV thriller, The XYY Man in the late 1970s.

Along with Philip Guard and John Bryning, Dignam can be heard on the fade-out of the Beatles' song "I Am the Walrus", during which is played a 1967 BBC radio broadcast of King Lear, with Dignam in the role of the Earl of Gloucester.

Dignam was married three times, divorced twice (his character in The XYY Man frequently complains about the expense of maintaining multiple ex-wives).

== Family ==
His brother Basil was also a well-known character actor and his sister-in-law was the actress Mona Washbourne.

== Dollis Hill ==
Dignam lived in Dollis Hill, north-west London, from 1967 until his death in 1989.

== Selected filmography ==
- Train of Events (1949) − Bolingbroke (segment "The Actor")
- Murder in the Cathedral (1951) − First Knight
- The Maggie (1954) − The Laird
- Doctor in the House (1954) − Examiner at Microscope (uncredited)
- Beau Brummell (1954) − Mr. Burke
- Lease of Life (1954) − Mr. Black
- The Passing Stranger (1954) − Inspector
- Carrington V.C. (1955) − Prosecutor
- The Prisoner (1955) − The Governor
- Escapade (1955) − Sykes
- They Can't Hang Me (1955) − Prison Governor
- The Adventures of Quentin Durward (1955) − Innkeeper (uncredited)
- Sink the Bismarck! (1960) − Captain (Ark Royal)
- The Pure Hell of St Trinian's (1960) − Prosecuting Counsel
- No Love for Johnnie (1961) − Earnley Constituent (uncredited)
- In Search of the Castaways (1962) − Rich Man at Yacht Party
- Lancelot and Guinevere (1963) − Merlin
- Siege of the Saxons (1963) − King Arthur
- Tom Jones (1963) − Lieutenant
- Dr. Syn, Alias the Scarecrow (1963) − The Bishop
- The Eyes of Annie Jones (1964) − Orphanage director
- Clash by Night (1964) − Sydney Selwyn
- A Jolly Bad Fellow (1964) − The Master
- Game for Three Losers (1965) − Attorney General
- For Whom the Bell Tolls (1965) − El Sordo
- The Taming of the Shrew (1967) − Vincentio
- Frozen Flashes (1967) − Sir John
- The Charge of the Light Brigade (1968) − Gen. Airey
- Isadora (1968) − (uncredited)
- Hamlet (1969) − Polonius
- The Mind of Mr. J.G. Reeder (1969–1971) − Lord Nettlefold
- There's a Girl in My Soup (1970) − Wedding Guest (uncredited)
- Jude the Obscure (1971) − Vicar
- Dead Cert (1974) − Clifford Tudor
- Memoirs of a Survivor (1981) − Newsvendor
- The Chain (1984) − Ambrose
- On the Black Hill (1988) − Reverend Latimer (final film role)

== Radio ==
- The Dark Tower (1946)
