= St Joseph's College, Stoke-on-Trent =

St Joseph's College

Location
- London Road; Stoke-on-Trent, Staffordshire, ST4 5NT; England; 52.988°N 2.199°W

Information
- Type: Grammar school; Academy
- Motto: Fideliter et Fortiter
- Religious affiliation: Roman catholic
- Established: 1932
- Founders: Christian Brothers
- Local authority: Stoke-on-Trent
- Department for Education URN: 136460 Tables
- Ofsted: Reports
- Head Teacher: C Slattery
- Gender: Mixed
- Age: 11 to 18
- Enrolment: 1068
- Houses: Kerrigan O’Donoghue Nano Nagle Edmund Rice Blessed Tansi
- Colours: Black & red
- Website: http://www.stjosephstrentvale.com/

St Joseph's College is a coeducational grammar school located in Trent Vale, Stoke on Trent, Staffordshire. The school's oldest and original building in this location is a Grade II listed structure which was previously a residential property before it was bought by the Christian Brothers in 1931.

== History ==
The school was founded by the Christian Brothers in 1932. It moved into the present buildings in 1936, and was recognised by the Board of Education in the following year.

St Joseph's was a direct grant grammar school until the 11-plus was abolished in Stoke in 1967, after which the grant was gradually phased out. The school re-opened as a fully independent school in 1980, and in the following years began to admit girls. In the early 1980s the school pulled out of the Catholic reorganisation of secondary provision and decided to stay private. When grant maintained schools were allowed it started to admit non-fee paying pupils. It is the only grammar school in the area as the council abolished the grammar system but as a private school it was allowed to continue.

After many years as a Preparatory and Senior School, the Preparatory School split off to form a new independent school elsewhere on the site, while the High School became a state-maintained grammar school. The school achieved Science College status in 2004.

Applicants to the school are required to take an entrance examination. Approximately 75% of applicants reach the school's qualifying standard, and places are allocated among these using other criteria (faith, siblings and distance). St Joseph's has Specialist Status for Science and Mathematics and is rated as Outstanding in all areas by Ofsted. The college was amongst the first schools to convert to Academy status in 2011 and in 2012 became one of the country's first Teaching Schools.

== Notable former pupils ==
- Geoffrey Prime (b. 1938) - former spy, convicted of espionage and child sexual abuse
- Trevor Burton (b.1943) - Commonwealth Games athlete
- Kevin McDonald (b. 1947) - Archbishop of Southwark
- Terry Green (b. 1951) - businessman
- Dominic Cork (b. 1971) - cricketer, Staffordshire, Derbyshire, England
- Emma Jackson (b. 1988) - athlete, England 800m runner
- Dan Croll (b. 1990) - singer-songwriter
- Kian Emadi (b. 1992) - track cyclist, medalist at the 2014 Commonwealth Games
- Harry McKirdy (b. 1997) - footballer
- Ciaran Algar, Award-winning folk musician.
