= Bill Gilmour (director) =

Scots television director

- Born: 17 March 1939 (age 86); Peebles, Scotland, United Kingdom
- Occupation: Television director

Bill Gilmour is a Scots television director who worked for Granada Television for over twenty years.

== Early life and education ==
He was born on 17 March 1939 in the small town of Peebles in the Tweed Valley of the Scottish Borders. He went to Ealing Art College in West London, where he specialised in photography, while attending Frank Auerbach's drawing classes. He joined Scottish Television in 1960 as a camera operator, moving after four years to floor managing, before joining Granada Television in 1967. Gilmour began directing in 1972. He remained with Granada until 1989.

== Career ==
Gilmour directed the plays Happy Returns by Brian Clarke, Some Enchanted Evening by C. P. Taylor, and The Game by Paul Pender.

He directed episodes of the off-beat detective television series, Strangers, and the 'spin off' series, Bulman by writers Murray Smith, Paul Wheeler and Eddie Boyd. He directed many episodes of Sam, The Spoils of War (TV series) and This Year Next Year, series written by John Finch, which were shot in studio and on location in the Lake District and the Yorkshire Dales. Gilmour's work continued with Cribb, a Victorian Scotland Yard detective drama based on the novels by Peter Lovesey, and House of Caradus, a series set in a fine art auction house, as well as twenty-seven episodes of Crown Court, a courtroom drama in which a case is played before a jury drawn from members of the public. Over the years, he directed one hundred and eighty-six episodes of Britain's longest-running soap opera, Coronation Street.

In the 1970s, Gilmour directed episodes of the comedy How's Your Father, written by John Stevenson. He produced and directed The Cuckoo Waltz, written by Geoffrey Lancashire, a comedy series about a young married couple and their lodger.

He directed twenty-six episodes of Loving for ABC Television in New York, nine episodes of EastEnders for the BBC, a comedy William and Wilma for Gemini Films and WDR in Cologne and Hollyoaks for Channel 4.

In Manchester, he directed Maureen Pryor in a stage production of Before Breakfast by Eugene O'Neill.

Gilmour directed twenty-six episodes of Allsorts, continuing an interest in children's reading. With Three Bob for D-Day, he went on the fortieth anniversary of D-Day to Normandy with a coach full of Liverpool riflemen to make two films. He made Working in a large psychiatric hospital. Playing is a film on children's street songs. He directed an edition of World in Action, the story being, the less you earn the higher a proportion goes in tax.

He contributed an essay to the book, Granada Television, The First Generation, edited by Michael Cox, John Finch, and Marjorie Giles.

== Personal life ==
In 1983, newspapers reported that Gilmour was going to marry Julie Goodyear, who played Bet Lynch in Coronation Street. It was then reported that the engagement had been broken ten days before the wedding.

Gilmour lives in Edinburgh.
