= Emma Jackson (runner) =

Emma Jackson (born 7 June 1988 at Newcastle-under-Lyme, Staffordshire) is an 800m runner who reached the semi-finals of the 2011 World Championships in Daegu, South Korea. She also represented England at the 2010 Commonwealth Games, finishing 4th in the final of the 800 metres. She has represented Great Britain at every age group and in 2007 was the European Junior silver medal winner and the World's fastest Junior 800 metres runner.

== Education ==
Jackson attended St. Joseph's College, Stoke-on-Trent and then achieved a first class honours degree in Accounting and Finance at Keele University.

== Athletics ==
In 2006, Jackson won a gold medal in the 800m at the English Schools Athletic Championships.

In 2007, Jackson was 2nd in the European Junior 800 metres final in Hengelo, Holland. She was also the World's fastest female Junior for 800 metres.

In 2008, Jackson won a bronze medal in the 1500m at the British University Championships and a gold medal in the 800m at the England Athletics under-23 Championships.

In 2010, Jackson finished fourth for the Great Britain team in the 800m at the European Team Championships, and fourth for the England team in the 800m at the Commonwealth Games.

In 2011, Jackson reached the semi-final of the World Athletics Championships 800 metres in Korea. She was 2nd to Jenny Meadows in the World Challenge meeting in Hengelo and won the European Classic meeting in Rovereto. She broke the 2 minute barrier for 800 metres for the first time and ran each of her last 3 races of 2011 in under 2 minutes.
