= Strangers (1978 TV series) =

- Genre: Crime drama
- Created by: Murray Smith
- Starring: Don Henderson; Dennis Blanch; Frances Tomelty; John Ronane; David Hargreaves; Fiona Mollison; Mark McManus; Bruce Bould; Thorley Walters
- Composer: Mike Moran
- Country of origin: United Kingdom
- Original language: English
- No. of seasons: 5
- No. of episodes: 32

Production
- Executive producer: Richard Everitt
- Producer: Mervyn Watson
- Cinematography: Mike Thomson; Mike Popley
- Editor: David Rees
- Running time: 60 minutes
- Production company: Granada Television

Original release
- Network: ITV
- Release: 5 June 1978 – 20 October 1982

Related
- The XYY Man; Bulman

Strangers is a British television crime drama series, principally written and created by Murray Smith, and first broadcast on ITV on 5 June 1978. The series, featuring the characters of Detective Sergeant George Bulman (Don Henderson) and his assistant Detective Constable Derek Willis (Dennis Blanch), was a spin-off from the 1976 TV series The XYY Man, adapted from the novels of Kenneth Royce. The series was first suggested by Granada Television executives, who in 1977, outlined their plan to devise a new series to feature the regular characters of Bulman and Willis.

"... I was sent here to be a stranger in town, a face they didn't recognise ..." - George Bulman

The series began life as a fairly standard police drama, with Bulman positioned as its eccentric lead. The series' premise centred on a group of police officers, including Bulman and Willis, known as 'Unit 23', who are brought together from different parts of the country to Manchester to infiltrate areas and investigate crimes that familiar local detectives could not. Five series were broadcast, with the final episode airing on 20 October 1982.

All five series of Strangers were released on DVD via the Network imprint as a complete box-set on 19 October 2009.

Following the series, a further spin-off, simply entitled Bulman, ran for two series on ITV. It follows Bulman, again played by Don Henderson, as he retires from the police and becomes a private detective.

== Characters ==
Initially Unit 23 consisted of Bulman, Willis and WDC Linda Doran (Frances Tomelty). Local liaison was provided by Detective Sergeant David Singer (John Ronane), while their superior officer was Detective Chief Inspector Rainbow (David Hargreaves). In the early years few episodes featured all five of these characters, most using just two or three of the regulars. The second series, shown in early 1979, introduced WDC Vanessa Bennett, played by Fiona Mollison, who replaced Frances Tomelty. David Hargreaves also departed the show following this series.

For the third series Bulman, Willis, Bennett and the newly promoted Detective Inspector Singer became members of the Inter City Squad under the command of Detective Chief Superintendent Jack Lambie (Mark McManus). The basic premise was similar, but rather than covering just the Northwest of England the squad's remit extended to the whole country. By the fourth series Bulman had also gained promotion to Detective Chief Inspector. This series also reintroduced the semi-regular character William Dugdale (Thorley Walters), a member of the British Foreign Office and the Secret Intelligence Service, who became involved when there was a political or intelligence aspect to an investigation.

== Production ==
The first series was shot primarily on videotape, with only location footage being shot on film. The second series featured more use on film: the opening episode, "The Wheeler Dealers", was shot entirely on film and the final episode, "Marriages, Deaths and Births", was shot entirely on film except for the title sequence and a small number of scenes at the police station. From the third series onwards the entire production moved to 16mm film.

The first series was scripted by a number of writers, and only Leslie Duxbury wrote more than one episode. He contributed one further script, for the second series. During series two the series creator, Murray Smith, became the principal writer, and he wrote all but six of the remaining twenty-five episodes.

== Cast ==
- Don Henderson as DS/DCI George Bulman
- Dennis Blanch as DC/DS Derek Willis
- Frances Tomelty as WDC Linda Doran (Series 1—2)
- John Ronane as DS/DI David Singer (Series 1—4)
- David Hargreaves as DCI Rainbow (Series 1—2)
- Fiona Mollison as WDC Vanessa Bennett (Series 2—5)
- Mark McManus as DCS Jack Lambie (Series 3—5)
- Bruce Bould as DI Tom Casey (Series 3)
- Thorley Walters as William Dugdale (Series 3—5)

== Episodes ==
=== Series 1 (1978) ===
No.	Title	Directed by	Written by	Original release date
1	"The Paradise Set"	Murray Smith	Carole Wilks	5 June 1978
Arriving in Manchester to work on their new patch as strangers to the local underworld, Bulman and Willis investigate a jewel robbery.
2	"Duty Roster"	Ivor Marshall	Oliver Horsburgh	12 June 1978
A routine assignment to follow up muggings of a local postman leads Bulman and Willis to a much bigger case, much to Rainbow's annoyance.
3	"Silver Lining"	Steve Wakeham	Bill Gilmour	19 June 1978
Bulman becomes a bookie and Doran gets a job in a tipster's office to uncover a case of race-fixing.
4	"Accidental Death"	Brian Finch	Nicky Cooney	26 June 1978
After a prominent local journalist is murdered Doran goes undercover as a reporter on his old desk and Willis becomes a coroner's officer.
5	"Briscoe"	Leslie Duxbury	Yvonne Goode	3 July 1978
Bulman is assigned to establish whether the suspicious practices of a uniform branch sergeant point to his being crooked.
6	"Right and Wrong"	Cecil Taylor	J. Bruce	10 July 1978
Willis and Doran play man and wife to investigate their neighbour, a prominent local councillor who is suspected of receiving bribes to initiate controversial new education practices.
7	"Paying Guests"	Leslie Duxbury	Quentin Lawrence	17 July 1978
Bulman co-opts Briscoe into lodging with the Parkers, who are assisting him with his enquiries concerning a bank robbery.

=== Series 2 (1979) ===
No.	Title	Directed by	Written by	Original release date
1	"The Wheeler Dealers"	Murray Smith	Sally Taylor	9 January 1979
With Rainbow growing increasingly frustrated at their unorthodox methods, Bulman, Willis and Doran are on a case involving illegally imported goods. Bulman's head is turned by a lady doctor who is involved in the case.
2	"Call of the Wild"	Leslie Duxbury	Baz Taylor	16 January 1979
Bulman goes under cover with a gang to gather evidence on a number of robberies and finds himself involved in the perpetration of one of them, which, unbeknownst to him, Singer is pursuing.
3	"Clever Dick"	Brian Finch	Quentin Lawrence	23 January 1979
When a hotshot former colleague of Bulman's comes up from London to take the lead in a counterfeit case Bulman's annoyance is matched by his curiosity as to why.
4	"Friends in High Places"	Murray Smith	Bill Gilmour	30 January 1979
Bulman and Willis are on the trail of a man who attacked a youth in a hotel toilet, unaware that there are other parties interested in the case for other reasons.
5	"Marriages, Deaths and Births"	Murray Smith	Charles Sturridge	6 February 1979
Bulman attempts to arrest a gangland ringleader, but finds himself being kidnapped.

=== Series 3 (1980) ===
No.	Title	Directed by	Written by	Original release date
1	"Retribution"	Murray Smith	Carol Wilks	14 October 1980
The team come under the command of DCS Lambie and a new Inter City Squad based in London. They immediately become involved in investigating arms trafficking in the capital.
2	"You Can't Win Them All"	Murray Smith	Bill Gilmour	21 October 1980
A fraud investigation gets complicated when Bulman and Willis find that the Foreign Office has an interest in one of the individuals involved.
3	"Armed and Dangerous (Part 1)"	Murray Smith	William Brayne	28 October 1980
Bulman and Willis are assigned to bring a suspect to London for questioning, but things do not go smoothly.
4	"Racing Certainty (Part 2)"	Murray Smith	Ken Grieve	4 November 1980
Bulman and Willis go under cover to flush out the person who murdered their colleague at a racetrack.
5	"Clowns Don't Cry"	Murray Smith	William Brayne	11 November 1980
One of Bulman's contacts is beaten up, and he becomes embroiled in a case that leads to international espionage and the involvement of Dugdale.
6	"Tom Thumb and Other Stories"	Murray Smith	Laurence Moody	18 November 1980
Bulman disguises himself as a tramp to try to track down a drug smuggler at Liverpool's docks and finds himself caught in the crossfire of factions within the gang.
7	"No Orchids for Missing Blandisch"	Murray Smith	Bill Gilmour	25 November 1980
A tip-off leads Bulman, Willis and Bennett to an arms-dealing operation with a hired killer involved.

=== Series 4 (1981) ===
No.	Title	Directed by	Written by	Original release date
1	"The Moscow Subway Murders"	Murray Smith	William Brayne	25 September 1981
Bulman, now promoted to Detective Chief Inspector, feels frustrated with the office-bound nature of the job, but is soon challenged by an intriguing murder case.
2	"The Loneliness of the Long Distance Copper"	Murray Smith	Tristan de Vere Cole	2 October 1981
A convict who has a score to settle with Lambie escapes from prison.
3	"A Dear Green Place"	Edward Boyd	Bill Gilmour	9 October 1981
Escorting a prisoner from Glasgow to London turns out to be anything but a routine assignment for the squad.
4	"Stand and Deliver"	Murray Smith	Bill Gilmour	16 October 1981
The squad is called upon to investigate a highway robbery.
5	"The Flowers of Edinburgh"	Edward Boyd	Jonathan Wright Miller	23 October 1981
Bulman and Willis head to Edinburgh to investigate a blackmail racket.
6	"Soldiers of Misfortune"	Murray Smith	William Brayne	30 October 1981
The squad becomes involved in a conflict between rival groups of mercenaries.

=== Series 5 (1982) ===
No.	Title	Directed by	Written by	Original release date
1	"A Much Underestimated Man"	Murray Smith	Ken Grieve	8 September 1982
Bulman and Willis are on the trail of a hitman before he reaches his target.
2	"A Swift and Evil Rozzer"	Murray Smith	William Brayne	15 September 1982
The squad investigates the kidnapping of a prominent politician.
3	"The Tender Trap"	Bruce Crowther	Ben Bolt	22 September 1982
Bulman and Willis investigate a crooked land developer.
4	"The Lost Chord"	Murray Smith	Bill Gilmour	29 September 1982
The squad visit Cambridge when a number of politicians die in strange circumstances.
5	"A Free Weekend in the Country"	Bruce Crowther	Bill Gilmour	6 October 1982
A police officer is murdered during a weekend seminar on urban terrorism.
6	"Charlie's Brother's Birthday (Part 1)"	Murray Smith	Roger Tucker	13 October 1982
The squad follow the trail of stolen coffins to uncover a smuggling ring.
7	"With These Gloves You Can Pass Through Mirrors (Part 2)"	Murray Smith	William Brayne	20 October 1982
As Bulman faces retirement the squad closes in on the smuggling gang.
