= Barbara Wilshere =

British actress

Barbara Edith Eileen Wilshere (born 7 December 1959) is a South African-born British actress who has appeared in theatre, films and television.

== Early life ==
Born in Bloemfontein, South Africa, Barbara returned with her family to Cheshire in 1965. She attended Wilmslow County Grammar School for Girls, and subsequently The Bristol Old Vic Theatre School.

== Career ==
She was the guest lead in the fourth episode of Sherlock Holmes ("The Solitary Cyclist"), and was a regular cast member in Albion Market (Carol Broadbent), The Paradise Club (Carol Kane), Between the Lines (Kate Roberts) and The Lakes (Dr. Sarah Kilbride).

Her television work also includes EastEnders, Wallander, Doctors, Heartbeat, Pie in the Sky, Inspector Lynley, The Bill, Holby City, Judge John Deed, Casualty and Peak Practice. In 2020, she portrayed the role of Miriam Shaw in an episode of the BBC soap opera Doctors. She played television producer Anna Instone in 2023 BBC One miniseries The Reckoning.

Her film work includes Dean Spanley with Peter O’Toole, and Another Life with Tom Wilkinson.

== Personal life ==
Barbara married the actor Paul Ridley in 1989 and they have two sons, Jack and Hugo.
