= Fiona Mollison =

British television and theatre actress (born 1954)

- Born: 9 January 1954 (age 72); Java, Indonesia
- Years active: 1977–present
- Spouse: David Gilmore (three sons)

Fiona Mollison (born 9 January 1954) is a British television and theatre actress.

Her father managed a rubber company in British Malaya, and sent Fiona to England to a boarding school. She attended the Bush Davies School of Theatre Arts to learn ballet, but then switched to the Central School of Speech and Drama to study acting instead.

Early in her career she appeared in 22 episodes of Strangers as WDC Vanessa Bennett.

In the 1987 television mini-series A Perfect Spy, based on the novel by John Le Carré, Mollison portrayed the incisive wife of a recruitment officer within British intelligence.

Mollison appeared in the role of Annie in the 1992 BBC adaptation of Joseph Conrad's novel The Secret Agent (which also featured David Suchet, Cheryl Campbell and Janet Suzman).

Mollison also has appeared in episodes of Lytton's Diary (as Catherine Lytton), On the Up (as Jane Webster), As Time Goes By (as Sally Curtis), Hollyoaks, Hazell, Boon, Minder, The Bill, Inspector Morse (as Sheila Phillipson in "Last Seen Wearing"), Trial & Retribution (in "Siren"), and Midsomer Murders (in "They Seek Him Here").

In 2000–2001, she played Victoria Hutchinson in the soap opera Hollyoaks.

== Family ==
Mollison is married to the director David Gilmore. She met Gilmore when she got a part in a play he was directing, Move Over Mrs Markham, where she played the au-pair. They have three sons, Charles, George and Edward, and live in Wimbledon, London, England. They also have a house in France, and she enjoys yoga and interior design in her spare time.

== Filmography ==
Year	Title	Role	Notes
1978	Sweeney 2	Mrs. Haughton	
2015	The Second Best Exotic Marigold Hotel	Susan	
