= Chessgame =

1983 British TV series

- Genre: Thriller
- Written by: Murray Smith; John Brason
- Directed by: William Brayne; Ken Grieve; Roger Tucker
- Starring: Terence Stamp; Carmen du Sautoy; Michael Culver; Robin Sachs
- Theme music composer: Christopher Gunning
- Composers: Christopher Gunning; Dick Walter
- Country of origin: United Kingdom
- Original language: English
- No. of series: 1
- No. of episodes: 6

Production
- Producer: Richard Everitt
- Running time: 60 minutes
- Production company: Granada Television

Original release
- Network: ITV
- Release: 23 November – 28 December 1983

Chessgame is a British television series produced by Granada Television for the ITV network in 1983.

The theme music was composed by Christopher Gunning.

Based on a series of novels by Anthony Price, the series dealt with the activities of a quartet of counter-intelligence agents: David Audley (Terence Stamp), Faith Steerforth (Carmen du Sautoy), Nick Hannah (Michael Culver) and Hugh Roskill (Robin Sachs).

== Episodes ==
One series of six episodes was made. It adapted, in order, Anthony Price's first three novels: "The Labyrinth Makers" (1970), "The Alamut Ambush" (1971) and "Colonel Butler's Wolf" (1972)

No.	Title	Directed by	Written by	Original release date
1	"Flying Blind"	William Blayne	Murray Smith, based on "The Labyrinth Makers"	23 November 1983
The wreckage of a plane, which crashed 27 years ago, is discovered when a lake is being drained. When the Russians show their interest David Audley receives a priority call to investigate the wreckage.
2	"Cold Wargame"	William Blayne	Murray Smith, based on "The Labyrinth Makers"	30 November 1983
Audley believes the Pembroke is a red herring, and is more interested in the Berlin boxes Steerforth was carrying. KGB agent Igor Panin arrives in Britain under cover as an archaeologist, and Roskill thinks the plane may have dropped the boxes in Roman ruins.
3	"Enter Hassan"	Ken Grieve	Murray Smith, based on "The Alamut Ambush"	7 December 1983
Llewellyn uses Audley's Middle East experience to investigate who bombed his car. Jenkins may be the real target. Hassan, a Palestinian, has infiltrated the Ryal Foundation, so Roskill recruits his lover, Lady Isobel, to find information.
4	"The Alamut Ambush"	Ken Grieve	Murray Smith, based on "The Alamut Ambush"	14 December 1983
The bloodshed at Colin Jenkins' funeral left two dead and Llewellyn shot. Hugh learns Colin was killed because he saw something he shouldn't have. Mossad tells Audley that there will be a one-off meeting of the Alamut List. So why is Llewellyn there?
5	"The Roman Connection"	Roger Tucker	John Brason, based on "Colonel Butler's Wolf"	21 December 1983
Neil Smith died in a motorcycle accident, but his University professor believes he was a Russian sleeper. Nick Hannah escapes with his life, at Eden Hall, while doing a background check. Hannah has to go undercover as archaeologist Colonel Butler.
6	"Digging Up the Future"	Roger Tucker	John Brason, based on "Colonel Butler's Wolf"	28 December 1983
Professor Epton confronts Nick Hannah on his true identity, but admits there was an Apostle spy ring. With a sniper still at loose, Audley believes a demonstration against the visit of General Pensadore is a blind to protect a Soviet asset.

The series was later rebroadcast in 1986 as three TV movies called The Alamut Ambush, The Deadly Recruits, and The Cold War Killers.

== Cast ==
Notable guest actors included David Haig, Nadim Sawalha, Rosalie Crutchley, Richard Wilson, Gary Whelan, Caroline Bliss, Anthony Calf, Art Malik and Matyelok Gibbs.

== Home media ==
At least one of the three TV movies was released on DVD by CFM Media in 2004: Alamut Ambush (94 min). Ken Grieve is credited as director.
