= Bulman =

- Genre: Crime drama
- Created by: Murray Smith
- Based on: The XYY Man by Kenneth Royce
- Starring: Don Henderson; Siobhan Redmond; Thorley Walters; John Benfield; Mark McManus; Simon Molloy; Dennis Blanch; Jeremy Gagan
- Composer: Dick Walter
- Country of origin: United Kingdom
- Original language: English
- No. of series: 2
- No. of episodes: 20

Production
- Executive producer: Richard Everitt
- Producers: Steve Hawes; Sita Williams
- Cinematography: Mike Blakeley
- Editors: Barry Bowmer; Paul Griffiths-Davies; Kim Horton
- Running time: 60 minutes
- Production company: Granada Television

Original release
- Network: ITV
- Release: 5 June 1985 – 8 August 1987

Related
- Strangers

Bulman is a British television crime drama series, principally written and created by Murray Smith. It was first broadcast on ITV on 5 June 1985. The series, featuring retired ex-cop George Bulman (Don Henderson) and his assistant Lucy McGinty (Siobhan Redmond), was a spin-off from the 1978 TV series Strangers, itself a spin-off of the 1976 TV series The XYY Man, which was adapted from the novels of Kenneth Royce. Produced by Granada Television, Bulman ran for two series, with the final episode broadcast on 8 August 1987.

In this incarnation, Don Henderson once again stars as former Detective Chief Inspector George Bulman, who is ostensibly retired from police work and now spends his spare time repairing old clocks. However, aside from fixing clocks, Bulman is also working as a private investigator, and even has an assistant, Lucy McGinty. Aside from a number of private clients, Bulman and Lucy are frequently drawn into the clandestine world of the secret service through the machinations of security chief Bill Dugdale (Thorley Walters), and also find themselves helping the police with cases under the instruction of Bulman's former boss Jack Lambie (Mark McManus). Bulman's former assistant, Derek Willis (Dennis Blanch), also appears in two episodes.

Both series were released on DVD via the Network imprint on 1 July 2013; however, these have since gone out of production. A complete box set was released on 20 August 2018, again via Network Distributing.

== Cast ==
- Don Henderson as George Bulman
- Siobhan Redmond as Lucy McGinty
- Thorley Walters as William 'Bill' Dugdale (Series 1 — Episodes 4, 6, 7 & 13; Series 2 — Episodes 5 & 7)
- John Benfield as DI Holmes (Series 1 — Episodes 1, 5 & 11)
- Mark McManus as DCS Jack Lambie (Series 1 — Episodes 1, 2 & 13)
- Simon Molloy as DS Mackay (Series 1 — Episodes 1, 5 & 7)
- Dennis Blanch as DS Derek Willis (Series 1 — Episodes 1 & 3)
- Jeremy Gagan as DCI Faulkner (Series 1 — Episodes 1 & 3)

== Episodes ==
=== Series overview ===
Series	Episodes	Originally released	
Series	Episodes	First released	Last released
1	13	5 June 1985	28 August 1985
2	7	20 June 1987	8 August 1987

=== Series 1 (1985) ===
No. overall	No. in series	Title	Directed by	Written by	Original release date
1	1	"Winds of Change"	William Brayne	Murray Smith	5 June 1985
Despite having retired from the police force to fix clocks, Bulman is asked to help out on a case.
2	2	"The Daughter Was a Dancer"	Ken Grieve	Murray Smith	12 June 1985
Bulman acts as safeguard for a businessman.
3	3	"Pandora's Many Boxes"	Christopher King	Murray Smith	19 June 1985
Bulman investigates when a man fails a security check.
4	4	"Death of a Hitman"	Bill Gilmour	Murray Smith	26 June 1985
Bulman helps a woman find out why her son was killed.
5	5	"The Name of the Game"	William Brayne	Murray Smith	3 July 1985
Bulman assists the police when a woman who blames her husband's death on a policeman swears revenge.
6	6	"One of Our Pigeons is Missing"	Charlie Nairn	Murray Smith	10 July 1985
Bulman goes undercover as a tramp to solve a case.
7	7	"Sins of Omission"	Roger Tucker	Murray Smith	17 July 1985
Lucy is used as bait to catch a female KGB agent.
8	8	"Another Part of the Jungle"	Christopher King	Henry Livings	24 July 1985
Bulman is hired to fix a church clock but must contend with a hitman instead.
9	9	"Born Into the Purple"	Bill Gilmour	Paul Wheeler	31 July 1985
Bulman investigates thefts in a wealthy household.
10	10	"A Cup for the Winner"	David Carson	Murray Smith	7 August 1985
Bulman is hired by an American to find his family property.
11	11	"I Met a Man Who Wasn't There"	Ken Grieve	Henry Livings	14 August 1985
Bulman interferes with the schemes of a vengeful villain.
12	12	"A Moveable Feast"	Bill Gilmour	Paul Wheeler	21 August 1985
Bulman helps a couple running a catering service.
13	13	"A Man of Conviction"	Tom Cotter	Murray Smith	28 August 1985
Bulman goes undercover to investigate robberies by prisoners.

=== Series 2 (1987) ===
No. overall	No. in series	Title	Directed by	Written by	Original release date
14	1	"Chinese Whispers"	William Brayne	Murray Smith	20 June 1987
Bulman re-encounters a convict that he helped to put away during his time in the police force.
15	2	"Death by Misadventure"	David Carson	Murray Smith	27 June 1987
Bulman investigates when a reporter is killed at a racetrack.
16	3	"White Lies"	Gareth Morgan	Murray Smith	4 July 1987
Bulman helps Commander Morrison on a case.
17	4	"Chicken of the Baskervilles"	William Brayne	Murray Smith	18 July 1987
Bulman poses as a butler to investigate a butler's disappearance.
18	5	"Thin Ice"	Bruce MacDonald	Murray Smith	25 July 1987
Bulman investigates when he hears rumours that Dugdale has been found dead.
19	6	"W.C. Fields Was Right"	Sarah Harding	Murray Smith	1 August 1987
Bulman investigates a series of incidents involving young children and animals.
20	7	"Ministry of Accidents"	Brian Mills	Murray Smith	8 August 1987
Bulman offers to help out Dugdale one last time.
