= Roger Tucker =

British television and film director (born 1945)

- Born: Roger Clive Tucker; Bristol, England
- Occupation: Director
- Years active: 1972–present

Roger Tucker (born 13 May 1945) is a British television and film director. Since 1972 he has directed over 40 television series, miniseries, and television films, including many dramas, thrillers, and action series.

== Career ==
Roger Tucker was born in Bristol, England. He made his first film, Karst, at the age of 18, and it was screened at the 1965 British Film Institute's Young Film-makers' Competition and awarded the Senior Trophy. The film was also screened at the London Film Festival and at Expo 67.

Tucker was president of the film society at Sussex University, which he attended 1964–1967, and he received a BA in psychology and philosophy. On the strength of his film Karst, after graduation he was hired at Granada Television, and directed in current affairs, documentaries, arts features, and drama. While at Granada, he directed the young Ian Charleson in his first starring screen role in A Private Matter (TV movie, 1974), opposite Rachel Kempson (Lady Redgrave). While living in Manchester, Tucker also did theatre work, directing actors such as Richard Wilson and Maureen Lipman, and plays such as The Wages of Thin, the first stage play by Trevor Griffiths.

In 1976 he left Granada to be a freelance director. Work on many of the classic television action series followed, including Gangsters (3 episodes), Shoestring, The Professionals, and Dempsey and Makepeace. He also directed the 1986 TV spy movie Deadly Recruits, starring Terence Stamp.

Other TV series directed by Tucker include, among many others, Chessgame (all), The Bill (6 episodes), Crown Court (7 episodes), Lovejoy (2 episodes), Sexton Blake and the Demon God (all), Hollyoaks (4 episodes), The Enigma Files (2 episodes), Moody and Pegg, Bulman, Saracen, The New Adventures of Robin Hood, 1990, Soldier Soldier, Strangers, Angels, and Sutherland's Law. In Scotland, he directed two miniseries: Bookie, and Winners and Losers, the latter of which he also wrote the script for.

Working internationally, he has directed series in Dutch (Villa Borghese, a 12-part 1991 series) and German (Die Wache, 1994). He also directed a Bollywood co-production series (Bombay Blue, 1997).

Tucker's feature film Waiting for Dublin (2007) won the Seahorse Award (Best Feature Film by male filmmakers) and the Audience Award at the Moondance International Film Festival, and was also screened at the Shanghai International Film Festival. His work has also been screened at the San Francisco Film Festival (And on the Eighth Day, 1968 documentary), and the Banff World Television Festival (Lovejoy, "The Axeman Cometh", 1986).

Tucker has written several film screenplays and television scripts. He has also directed more than two dozen commercials and longer promotions for various international brands, including Panasonic, Vidal Sassoon, Fiat, and Nissan. His advertising work has been screened at the IVCA Awards, and in 1967 he won an Advertising Creative Circle Award and subsequently gave an illustrated talk at the Royal Society of Arts.

== Personal life ==
Tucker was married in 1968 to television producer Susi Hush (1945–1995) and has a son, Simon, who ran the Young Foundation's Launchpad. He lived in London for many decades, and in 2011 he moved to Brighton.
