= Terry Green =

British executive

- Born: Terence Anthony Green; October 1951 (age 74–75)
- Education: St Joseph's College, Stoke-on-Trent; University of Liverpool
- Known for: former CEO, BHS and Debenhams

Terence Anthony Green (born October 1951) is a British businessman, a former chief executive (CEO) of BHS and Debenhams.

== Early life ==
Terence Anthony Green was born in October 1951. He was educated at St Joseph's College, Stoke-on-Trent, and the University of Liverpool.

== Career ==
Green started his career at C&A before moving to Dorothy Perkins in 1979, which was part of the Burton Group. In 1992, he was appointed chief executive of Debenhams, the department store group that demerged from Burton in 1997, making Green the CEO of a listed company.

Green was a director of Arcadia Group from February 1993 to 26 January 1998. In 2002, he was in talks with its CEO Philip Green, no relation, to buy Top Shop and Top Man, which he ran when he worked for Burton Group.

In 2007, Green was head of clothing for Tesco, and was paid a salary of about £2.5 million.
