= Don Henderson =

English actor (1931–1997)

- Henderson in White Angel (1994)
- Born: Donald Francis Henderson; 10 November 1931; Leytonstone, Essex, England
- Died: 22 June 1997 (aged 65); Warwick, Warwickshire, England
- Occupation: Actor
- Years active: 1964–1997
- Spouses: Hilary Henderson (died 1977) Shirley Stelfox (m. 1979)
- Children: 2

Donald Francis Henderson (10 November 1931 – 22 June 1997) was an English actor. He was known for playing both "tough guy" roles and authority figures, and is remembered for his portrayal of detective George Bulman between 1976 and 1987 in the Granada Television police drama series The XYY Man (1976-1977), Strangers (1978–1982), and Bulman (1985-1987). He was priest Frank Kane in BBC drama The Paradise Club (1989–90), and as General Tagge in the first Star Wars film (1977). Other credits included Warship (1973-1975), Poldark (1975), Doctor Who: Delta and the Bannermen (1987), Brazil (1985), The Adventures of Baron Munchausen (1988), Last of the Summer Wine (1988), Maigret (1988), Minder (1989), The Fool (1990), Boon (1991), Cracker (1993) and The Wind in the Willows (1996).

== Biography ==
Henderson was born into a working-class family in Leytonstone, Essex, the son of a carpenter, and grew up in Epping. After completing his national service as a technician in the Royal Army Dental Corps, he served with Essex Constabulary, reaching the rank of detective sergeant in their CID, and worked as an insurance salesman. He did not become a professional actor until his thirties, when a friend dared him to audition for the Royal Shakespeare Company, with whom he subsequently performed from 1966 until 1972.

Henderson had two children, a son and a daughter, with his first wife Hilary, who died from a mysterious lung disease in 1977. He remarried in 1979; his second wife was the actress Shirley Stelfox, with whom he would appear professionally many times. He lived in his adopted home town of Stratford-upon-Avon for many years, where he was a familiar face to locals.

== Career ==
Henderson is best remembered for his role as the fictional detective George Bulman. This character featured in three TV series: The XYY Man (1976-1977), Bulman rise from Detective Sergeant to Detective Chief Inspector in Strangers (1978–1982), and, in 1985, his character had retired from the police and was pursuing a career as a horologist in the series Bulman (1985-1987). He also starred in the TV drama series Warship.

In 1977, he appeared as General Taggi, Chief of the Imperial Army and a member of the Empire's Joint Chiefs, in the film Star Wars (1977).

Henderson made little money from his role in Star Wars—£300 for one day of filming. He also missed out on a large sum for his copy of the Star Wars script:

"I have only once been recognised as having been in Star Wars, and that was when I was making a film in Los Angeles. Somebody in the hotel I was staying at offered me $2000 for my copy of the Star Wars script. As I growled at him in amazement, he took that as a refusal, or that he had offered too little and eventually went up to an offer of $5000! Sadly, as with all my used scripts, I had given it to my kids to scribble and draw on."

In 1987, he played Gavrok in 3 episodes of Doctor Who: Delta and the Bannermen. He played Frank Kane working alongside Leslie Grantham (who played his brother) in 20 episodes of The Paradise Club (1989–1990).

Henderson voiced Tommy Brock in The World of Peter Rabbit and Friends.

His last television role was in 1997, when he played a Rogue Simulant in Episode: "Beyond a Joke" of the BBC2 comedy Red Dwarf.

== Death ==
Henderson was first diagnosed with throat cancer in 1980, and died of the disease at Warwick Hospital on 22 June 1997, aged 65, and was survived by his second wife Shirley Stelfox and his children.

== Filmography ==
=== Film ===
Year	Title	Role	Notes/Ref.
1968	A Midsummer Night's Dream	Attendant	
1974	Callan	George	
1974	Abby	Flip	
1975	Brannigan	Geef	
1975	The Ghoul	Ghoul	
1976	Voyage of the Damned	Engineering Officer	
1977	Star Wars	General Tagge	
1977	Crossed Swords	Burly Ruffian	
1978	The Big Sleep	Lou	
1980	The Island	Rollo	
1985	Brazil	First Black Maria Guard	
1985	Murder Elite	Sergeant Jessop	
1987	Billy the Kid and the Green Baize Vampire	The Wednesday Man	
1987	Out of Order	Car Driver	
1988	Blanc de Chine	Malcolm	
1988	The Adventures of Baron Munchausen	Commander	
1989	Tank Malling	Percy	
1989	The BFG	Bloodbottler / Fleshlumpeater / Sergeant	Voice
1990	The Fool	Bob	
1991	How's Business	Mr. Bailey	
1992	Carry On Columbus	The Bosun	
1992	As You Like It	The Dukes	
1993	The Baby of Macon	Father Confessor	
1993	The Trial	Flogger	
1994	White Angel	Inspector Taylor	
1994	No Escape	Killian	
1996	The Wind in the Willows	The Sentry	
1997	Preaching to the Perverted	Commander Cope	
1997	FairyTale: A True Story	Sydney Chalker	(final film role)

=== Television ===
Year	Title	Role	Notes/Ref.
1973–1975	Warship	Master-at-Arms Frank Heron	18 episodes
1975	Poldark	Tom Carne	3 episodes
1976–1977	The XYY Man	DS George Bulman	13 episodes
1978	Crossroads	Mr Black	6 episodes
1978	Danton's Death	Mercier	BBC Play of the Month
1978–1982	Strangers	George Bulman	30 episodes
1983	Jemima Shore Investigates	Conrad Coleman	1 episode
1984	Annika	Mr. Daniels	2 episodes
1985–1987	Bulman	George Bulman	20 episodes
1986	Dead Head	Det. Inspector Malcolm	Episode: "Why Me?"
1987	Knights of God	Colley	6 episodes
1987	Doctor Who: Delta and the Bannermen	Gavrok	3 episodes
1988	Last of the Summer Wine	Charlie	
1988	Maigret	Barge Captain	TV movie
1989	Minder	Billy Lynch	Episode: "Fiddler On The Hoof"
1989–1990	The Paradise Club	Frank Kane	20 episodes
1991	Boon	Don	Episode: "Two Men in a Vault"
1992	2point4 Children	Frank (Ben’s Dad)	Series 2 Episode 3 "One Night In Bangkok"
1993	Cracker	John Hennessey	Series 1 episode 2
1994	Pat and Margaret	Billy	
1995	The Famous Five	Block	Episode: "Five Go to Smuggler's Top"
1996	Casualty	Jerry Hunter	Episode: "Night Moves"
1997	Red Dwarf	Rogue Simulant	Episode: "Beyond a Joke"
1998	The World of Peter Rabbit and Friends	Tommy Brock	1 episode

=== Radio ===
- The Archers (1983) (Radio) ... Ben Warner
