= Helen Noble =

British actress

Helen Noble (born in Wigan) is a British actress best known for her role as Abby Davies in the British soap opera Hollyoaks from 2001 to 2004, with a brief return in 2005. She is also now an acting coach for kids and directs performances.

Helen attended Wigan's Willpower Youth Theatre as a teenager and it was through this and their links with Intercity Casting that she got her first audition to play Abby on Hollyoaks.

After leaving Hollyoaks, she presented and appeared in pantomime at the Manchester Opera House and in 2004 appeared on a celebrity version of The Weakest Link dressed as her pantomime character from Dick Whittington.

In the 2005–06 pantomime season she appeared as Princess Apricot Crumble in Jack & the Beanstalk at Theatre Royal, Plymouth. where she met her now husband Graham Tudor.

In February 2006, she fronted a bid to promote the work of the Halton Drug Action Team and its partner agencies in Widnes and Runcorn by living 'homeless' in the Halton YMCA.

In April 2006, she appeared alongside Sara Crowe in the dark-comedy The Safari Party written by Tim Firth at Richmond Theatre and toured the UK with the same play.

In September 2007, it was announced that along with "West End" actor Graham Tudor, she would be teaching students at a new acting school in Liverpool. named TrEAD. The pair have since married and had two children. Helen launched the associated agency Tread Management in 2012.

On 6 January 2010, Noble appeared on BBC2's Ready Steady Cook with Sarah Jayne Dunn.

In 2017, following numerous performances for Tread Productions including West End Story in Mexico and India, Helen enjoyed a successful return to the professional stage opposite her husband in the Broadway Musical The Last Five Years at the Epstein Theatre Liverpool in which they played a married couple whose relationship ended in turmoil. Directed by Welsh actor Iestyn Arwel the production received rave reviews.
