= Stephen Yardley =

English actor

- Born: 24 March 1942 (age 84); Ferrensby, Harrogate, Yorkshire, England
- Other name: Steven Yardley
- Occupation: Actor
- Years active: 1964–present
- Spouse(s): Jan Harvey (?-present); Elizabeth (1967–84)

Stephen Yardley (born 24 March 1942) is an English actor. After graduating from the Royal Academy of Dramatic Art in 1963, he became known for his many roles on UK television between 1964 and 2004.

== Career ==
In the mid-1960s, Yardley was a permanent member of the company at Dundee Repertory Theatre.

Yardley made early appearances on television in the 1960s in series including Danger Man and United!, and had an extended run during 1967–68 in Z-Cars. His subsequent work included performances as semi-reformed cat burglar William "Spider" Scott in The XYY Man (1976–77); as Detective Inspector Laker in Regan, the Armchair Theatre instalment which served as the pilot for The Sweeney; Max Brocard in Secret Army (1978); Roy Swetman, a professional hit man in "Hijack" (1980), an episode of The Professionals; and as Police Inspector Cadogan in Virtual Murder (1992).

Yardley twice had roles in Doctor Who – Sevrin in Genesis of the Daleks (1975) and Arak in Vengeance on Varos (1985) – and also took a part in the science fiction series Blake's 7 (1981) and the BBC adaptation of The Day of the Triffids (1981).

Yardley had a regular role as Ken Masters in the BBC television series Howards' Way (1985–90), appeared in an episode of Heartbeat in 1996, and played Vince Farmer in Channel 5's soap opera Family Affairs (1999–2003). Yardley most recently appeared in the Sky One series Hex (2004).
