= Bergerac (TV series) =

British crime drama television series (1981–1991)

- Genre: Crime; Drama; Mystery
- Created by: Robert Banks Stewart
- Starring: John Nettles; Terence Alexander; Sean Arnold; Louise Jameson; Annette Badland; Deborah Grant; Cécile Paoli; Celia Imrie; Thérèse Liotard
- Theme music composer: George Fenton
- Country of origin: United Kingdom
- Original language: English
- No. of series: 9
- No. of episodes: 87 (list of episodes)

Production
- Producers: Robert Banks Stewart (series 1–2); Jonathan Alwyn (series 3–5); George Gallaccio (series 6–9)
- Running time: 50 minutes (81 episodes); 90 minutes (6 Christmas specials)

Original release
- Network: BBC1
- Release: 18 October 1981 – 26 December 1991

Bergerac is a British crime drama television series. Produced by the BBC in association with the Australian Seven Network, and first screened on BBC1, it ran from 18 October 1981 to 26 December 1991. Set in Jersey, it stars John Nettles as the title character Jim Bergerac. He is initially a detective sergeant in Le Bureau des Étrangers, (Note: "The Foreigners' Office", a fictional department dealing with non-Jersey residents.) within the States of Jersey Police, but later leaves the force to become a private investigator.

Westward Studios' Bergerac reboot launched on U&Drama in February 2025.

== Background ==
The series ran from 1981 to 1991. It was created by producer Robert Banks Stewart when the star, Trevor Eve, of his previous detective series Shoestring (1979–1980), set in Bristol, declined to make a third series. Stewart and his production team used elements of Shoestring, along with unused story material intended for further seasons of that programme, and reworked them into a new series set in Jersey, thereby creating Bergerac.

The series begins with Bergerac returning to work after a particularly bad period in his life; he was suffering from alcoholism and the after effects of a badly-broken leg.

The final episode filmed was the 1991 Christmas special, titled "All for Love", which was set partly in Bath, Somerset.

On 24 February 2014, the BBC started a rerun of the series on daytime afternoons on BBC Two. The repeats concluded with series three, in order to avoid showing the Haut de la Garenne location, a former children's home which was the focus of an investigation into historic child abuse.

== Episodes ==
Series	Episodes	Originally released	
Series	Episodes	First released	Last released
1	10	18 October 1981	20 December 1981
2	9	9 January 1983	6 March 1983
3	10	3 December 1983	4 February 1984
4	9	11 October 1985	20 December 1985
Christmas special		26 December 1986	
5	8	3 January 1987	21 February 1987
Christmas special		26 December 1987	
6	7	2 January 1988	13 February 1988
Christmas special		27 December 1988	
7	8	28 January 1989	18 March 1989
Christmas special		23 December 1989	
8	10	14 January 1990	18 March 1990
Christmas special		26 December 1990	
9	10	5 January 1991	9 March 1991
Christmas special		26 December 1991	

== Cast and characters ==
=== Main ===
- John Nettles as Detective Sergeant Jim Bergerac
- Terence Alexander as Charlie Hungerford
- Sean Arnold as Chief Inspector/Superintendent Barney Crozier (series 1–8)
- Cécile Paoli as Francine Leland (series 1)
- Deborah Grant as Deborah Bergerac
- Annette Badland as Charlotte (series 1–3)
- Celia Imrie as Marianne Bellshade (series 2)
- Louise Jameson as Susan Young (series 4–8)
- Thérèse Liotard as Danielle Aubry (series 8–9).

=== Supporting ===
- Mela White as Diamante Lil (series 1–5)
- Lindsay Heath as Kim Bergerac (series 1–5)
- Geoffrey Leesley as Detective Constable Terry Wilson (series 1–5)
- Tony Melody as the Chief (series 1–3)
- Jonathan Adams as Dr LeJeune (series 1–3)
- Liza Goddard as Philippa Vale (series 3–7)
- Nancy Mansfield as Peggy Masters (series 4–7)
- Jolyon Baker as DC Barry Goddard (series 4–5)
- John Telfer as DC Willy Pettit (series 6–9)
- David Kershaw as DC Ben Lomas (series 6–9).

=== Lead character ===
According to a 2001 interview with Robert Banks Stewart, Nettles was cast on his insistence. He said, "A programme like that would never get made today without having a household name, but back then I fought to have John Nettles play Bergerac because he was right for it."

Bergerac drives a burgundy 1947 Triumph Roadster, with number plate J1610, instead of an approved police vehicle.

== Theme music ==
The original theme music, composed by George Fenton, featured a reggae and accordion refrain. In 1982, Fenton won a BAFTA Best Original Television Music award.

In 2018, Youngr rerecorded the track, entitled "Bergerac Remastered", with a video shot in locations around Jersey.

== Home media ==
In June 2021, the first two series became available on BritBox; series 3 to 9, with all of the Christmas special episodes, became available in October 2021. As of September 2021, series 1–3 and 5–9 were available to stream in the United States, via Amazon Prime with a BritBox subscription.

== Reboot from 2025 ==
Writer Toby Whithouse oversaw a new six-episode Bergerac series, which was aired in 2025. Damien Molony appeared in the title role, with filming taking place in Jersey and Plymouth for exterior and interior shots.

Co-stars include Zoë Wanamaker as a gender-flipped Charlie Hungerford, and Robert Gilbert as Barney Crozier. New characters include Arthur Wakefield (Philip Glenister), Margaret Heaton (Pippa Haywood), Uma Dalal (Sasha Behar) and Kara (Celine Arden).

== In popular culture ==
Portions of Bergerac's credits were featured in the Black Mirror episode "Loch Henry"; in the episode's story, it is revealed that VHS recordings of Bergerac had been taped over with snuff films.

== See also ==
- The Detectives: a BBC comedy series; one episode of which features Nettles' last performance to date as Jim Bergerac.
- Will Smith Presents the Tao of Bergerac: a radio comedy series based on an obsessive fan of Bergerac
- The Cult of Bergerac: a 30-minute BBC4 documentary from 2008, featuring many cast members and writer Robert Banks Stewart
- Triumph Roadster 1947 model car introduced in series 1 episode 1.
