= Fawlty Towers: The Play =

2016 comedy play

- Original language: English
- Written by: John Cleese
- Based on: Fawlty Towers; TV series by John Cleese and Connie Booth
- Characters: Basil; Sybil; Polly; Manuel; Major Gowen; Mrs Richards
- Genre: Comedy

Premiere
- Date: 19 August 2016
- Place: Roslyn Packer Theatre, Sydney

Fawlty Towers: The Play is a comedy play by John Cleese based on his television sitcom of the same name that he co-wrote with Connie Booth.

The play adapted three episodes of the television series, forming one storyline; "The Hotel Inspectors", "Communication Problems" and "The Germans".

== Production history ==
=== Australia (2016) ===
The play made its world premiere (as Fawlty Towers Live) at the Roslyn Packer Theatre in Sydney on August 19, 2016, before embarking on a tour of Australia. The planned tour of New Zealand was cancelled. The production was directed by Caroline J. Ranger and designed by Liz Ascroft and featured a cast including Stephen Hall as Basil Fawlty, Blazey Best as Sybil Fawlty, Aimee Horne as Polly and Syd Brisbane as Manuel.

=== West End (2024) ===
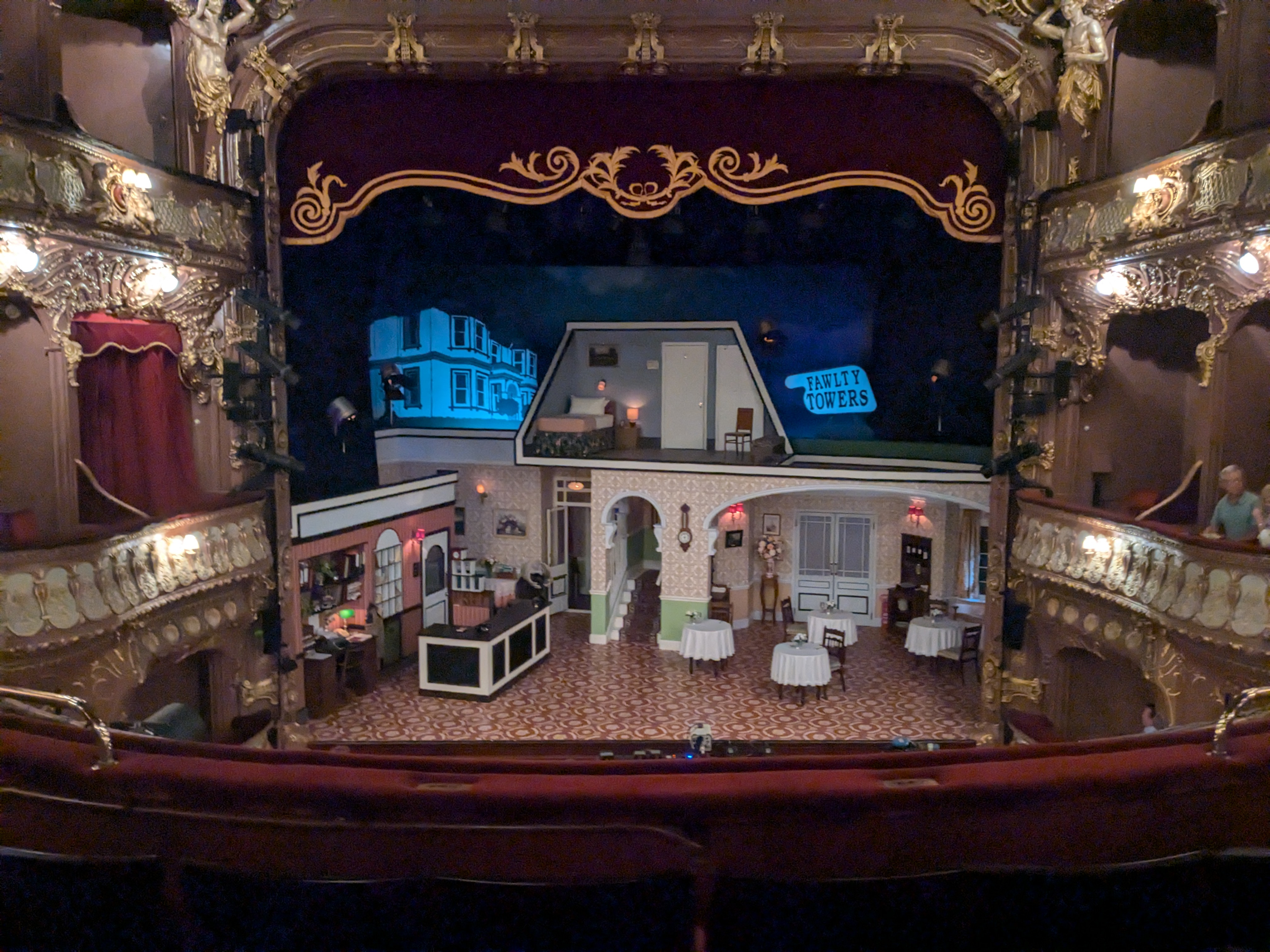
Stage of the West End production

The play made its UK premiere (as Fawlty Towers: The Play) at the Apollo Theatre in London's West End opening 4 May 2024. It was originally due to run until 28 September, however due to popular demand it was extended into 2025. The cast features Adam Jackson-Smith as Basil, Anna-Jane Casey as Sybil, Victoria Fox as Polly, Hemi Yeroham as Manuel and Paul Nicholas as the Major.Casting Director is Anne Vosser

=== UK Tour (2025–2026) ===
The play will embark on a tour around the UK opening in September 2025 at the Churchill Theatre, Bromley and concluding at the New Theatre, Oxford on 18 July 2026.

== Cast and characters ==
Character	Sydney	West End
Character	2016	2024
Basil	Stephen Hall	Adam Jackson-Smith
Sybil	Blazey Best	Anna-Jane Casey
Polly	Aimee Horne	Victoria Fox
Manuel	Syd Brisbane	Hemi Yeroham
Major Gowen	Paul Bertram	Paul Nicholas
Mrs Richards	Deborah Kennedy	Rachel Izen

== Television ==
On 3rd of September 2025 it was confirmed that a recording of the play will air on U&Gold

== Sequel ==
On 3rd of September 2025 it was confirmed that a sequel was in the works, both plays will not run the same time.
