= Payne (TV series) =

American television series (1999)

- Genre: Sitcom
- Created by: Judd Pilot; John Peaslee
- Based on: Fawlty Towers by: John Cleese; Connie Booth
- Starring: John Larroquette; JoBeth Williams; Julie Benz; Rick Batalla
- Composers: Scott Van Zen; Chris Wagner
- Country of origin: United States
- Original language: English
- No. of seasons: 1
- No. of episodes: 9

Production
- Executive producers: Judd Pilot; John Peaslee; Jerry Leider; Richard Reisberg; John Larroquette
- Producers: Tim Steele; Kevin Berg
- Production locations: Piru Mansion, California
- Camera setup: Multi-camera
- Running time: 30 minutes
- Production companies: Big Phone Productions; Port Street Films; Studios USA Television

Original release
- Network: CBS
- Release: March 15 – May 4, 1999

Payne is a 1999 American sitcom adapted from the 1970s British television comedy Fawlty Towers. This adaptation, which was a mid-season replacement on CBS, originally aired from March 15 to May 4, 1999. It costars John Larroquette, who was also an executive producer for the series, and JoBeth Williams. Julie Benz and Rick Batalla are featured as regular supporting characters. Despite receiving the blessing of John Cleese, who reportedly agreed to be an "irregular cast member" and perform in a recurring role as a rival hotelier if Payne were renewed, the series was cancelled following the broadcast of its eighth episode. A total of nine episodes were filmed, but one was not aired as part of the series' original presentation on CBS.

Payne is the third unsuccessful attempt by American television producers to adapt and transplant a version of Fawlty Towers to the United States. The first one, developed in 1978, is a 30-minute sitcom costarring Harvey Korman and Betty White. Titled Snavely and directed by Hal Cooper, that production never progressed beyond the completion of a pilot. The second series, Amanda's starring Bea Arthur, was broadcast in 1983 on ABC and lasted 10 episodes before it was cancelled.

== Premise ==
Payne was a remake of Fawlty Towers, though set in this version at an ambiguous location on the coast of California, as opposed to Torquay, England, in Fawlty Towers. The action takes place at the Whispering Pines Inn, owned and operated by Royal Payne and his wife, Constance. Royal was always trying to improve the quality of his hotel and eventually franchise the place, in search of immortal legendary status as a hotelier, like Conrad Hilton.

The pilot episode, "Pacific Ocean Duck" (which actually aired fifth in sequence), merged the plots of the Fawlty Towers episodes "Gourmet Night" and "The Hotel Inspectors".

Mirroring the opening sequence of Fawlty Towers, each episode begins with a closeup of the "Whispering Pines" sign, which either falls over or a letter or some other piece of it falls off as the scene progresses. In the episode "I Never Forget a Facelift", involving how the hotel deals with a hurricane, the sign is shown lying in pieces, shattered by the storm's heavy winds.

== Characters ==
Williams and Larroquette as Connie and Royal Payne

- Royal Payne (John Larroquette) – Inspired by Basil Fawlty, Royal had an overpowering obsession (not unlike Basil's generally obsessive behavior) with keeping up with a rival hotel called the Sand Dune, located just a short distance up the road. His schemes to do so cheaply or over-simply were the source of many of his problems. The viewer was given the impression that the only reason Whispering Pines ever had any guests at all was that it was in a popular resort area and the far superior Sand Dune was nearly always full. Payne like Basil is guilty of false economy, rudeness, and two-faced phonyness.
- Constance (Connie) Payne (JoBeth Williams) – The antagonistic dynamic between Connie and Royal was also nearly identical to that between Sybil and Basil with one distinct exception: their sex life was apparently extremely vibrant and healthy, whereas Basil and Sybil's was blatantly non-existent. Connie's gossip sessions on the telephone with her friends (a Sybil Fawlty characteristic) invariably had her bragging about how fantastic Royal was in bed, implying that this was why she continued to tolerate him. Since Royal had a Basil-like sense of embarrassment, this caused him enormous consternation. Connie is also the first name of Connie Booth, who played the maid, Polly, in Fawlty Towers and who co-wrote the show with her then-husband, Cleese.
- Breeze O’Rourke (Julie Benz) – A waitress/chambermaid, based on Polly in Fawlty Towers. One difference between Breeze and Polly was that Breeze was staunchly proud that she was a virgin, "saving herself for marriage". Otherwise, Breeze was, like Polly, intelligent, efficient, and repeatedly saving Royal from his own incompetence.
- Mo (Rick Batalla) – A bellhop from India, Mo is essentially modeled on the Manuel character in Fawlty Towers.

== Episodes ==
Episodes aired in the UK on the ITV network soon after the series run. The ninth episode was also broadcast in the UK, but not on CBS.

No.	Title	Directed by	Written by	Original release date
1	"The J. Edgar Hoover Pin Story"	Dorothy Lyman	Gail Parent	March 15, 1999
Royal has forgotten his and his wife's nineteenth wedding anniversary and he has no gift for Connie. Fortunately, he finds a diamond lapel pin in the hotel's lost-and-found cupboard, and he gives it to her to mark their special occasion. Unfortunately, a former guest—the pin's owner—returns to look for it.
2	"Sexual Intercom"	Michael Zinberg	Jennifer Fisher	March 17, 1999
Rival hotel, "The Sand Dune", is touting its new high-tech telephone system. Not to be outdone, Royal purchases an old, but sophisticated telephone system from the local mental health hospital. Much to gossipy Connie's delight, and Royal's eventual chagrin, they discover that the system allows the switchboard to eavesdrop on the sounds in any room.
3	"Whatever Happened to Baby Payne?"	John Rich	Rob Dames & Lenny Ripps	March 24, 1999
A reviewer from "Family Friendly Travel" is staying at the hotel with her baby. While she is there, the most dubious characters to ever stay at Whispering Pines check in and make their presence known.
4	"Gossip Checks In and a Cat Checks Out"	John Pasquin	Judd Pillot & John Peaslee	March 31, 1999
Royal scolds Connie for her incessant gossiping when it causes him embarrassment. However, he does a complete reversal when there's some gossip going around that he's desperate to know about and now Connie will tell everyone but him the juicy news. Royal's patience is further tried by a broken down air conditioning system during a record heat wave.
5	"Pacific Ocean Duck"	Andrew D. Weyman	Teleplay by John Peaslee & Judd Pillot; Adapted from stories by John Cleese & Connie Booth	April 7, 1999
Royal's stress level could not be higher. While trying to pull off a "gourmet night" featuring the creations of his new and talented but extremely temperamental chef, he hears a rumor that covert hotel inspectors are in town. He also learns that one can hire a high-price call girl in the bar at The Sand Dune, and prudish Royal is terrified that these "trollops" might infest his bar as well. As gourmet night gets underway the new chef is found unconscious (from an unknown health issue), and Royal assumes him to be dead, resulting in a replay of an element in the Fawlty Towers episode "The Kipper and the Corpse". Royal persuades a local Chinese restaurant to modify Peking duck into a concoction he calls "Pacific Ocean Duck"; but his car, which he had tried to repair himself, stalls, and in his haste to hop out and attempt to fix the car, Royal leaves it in gear and it rolls over a cliff, with the duck inside. Royal then hijacks a bicycle to fetch a replacement duck, but at the restaurant he accidentally takes the wrong tray, one that contains table scraps instead of the needed gourmet dish. Finally, Royal's sexist assumptions cause him not to realize that a hotel inspector might be female, but he knows a call girl would be, resulting in his making another disastrous assumption about a female guest. (Merges elements from the Fawlty Towers episodes "Gourmet Night" and "The Hotel Inspectors" with a brief scene inspired by "The Kipper and the Corpse".)
6	"Trouble in Room 206"	John Rich	Joseph Staretski	April 14, 1999
Prudish Royal would never consider renting a room by the hour, but the price offered by an amorous young couple is too much to decline. The problem is the hotel is full (a rarity); nevertheless, Royal thinks an elderly man and his wife will be away from their room for much of the day, so he decides to rent their room for a few hours. The situation quickly becomes complicated when the young couple literally get "entangled", are unable to leave, and elderly guests return.
7	"I Never Forget a Face-Lift"	Craig Zisk	James Kramer	April 21, 1999
A woman arrives to convalesce from a face-lift with bandages covering her eyes. As a hurricane has blown down the sign outside, her driver and she believes that they are at The Sand Dune, where she actually has a reservation. Royal pretends that this IS The Sand Dune, and everything that could possibly go wrong does.
8	"Wedding Fever"	Dorothy Lyman	Steve Atinsky & Dan O'Connor	April 28, 1999
Whispering Pines is hosting a wedding. Royal gives the bride's parents (who are paying for it) a 100% satisfaction money-back guarantee on the extremely expensive affair. Connie expects her rendition of the song "Fever" to be the highlight of the wedding reception and annoys everyone by practicing it incessantly at the piano in the bar. The groom and Breeze fall hard for each other, jeopardizing the wedding and Royal's money-back guarantee.
9	"Uncle Royal and Aunt Connie"	Michael Zinberg	Jonathan Leigh Solomon	May 4, 1999
Wealthy businessmen Mr and Mrs Allenbee are in town, deciding where to spend their spring retreat. Royal and Connie are expecting them for lunch, but Connie's nephew Nick is also visiting — straight out of prison.

== Reception ==
During its eight-week run in 1999, Payne received widespread negative reviews in the American and Canadian media. Caryn James, of The New York Times, disliked the series from its outset. In her review dated March 15, she wrote: 'It's enough to say, that this remake of John Cleese's hilarious, farcical Fawlty Towers has been given a hackneyed Hollywood treatment', adding that the comedic talents of Larroquette had been 'reduced to delivering hideous lines' from a patently weak script. Tom Shales, television critic for The Washington Post, was also critical of the sitcom in his review published on the same date, especially about Larroquette's casting as a much less likeable Basil Fawlty. Shales stated: 'Larroquette is all too believable as an obnoxious boor.' After cautioning every potential viewer of the new series to "Spare Yourself Payne", Shales recognized the production as 'barely' an improvement over the 1983 sitcom Amanda's, a previous failed attempt to adapt Fawlty Towers to American television. On Rotten Tomatoes, Payne has an aggregate score of 22% based on 2 positive and 7 negative critic reviews.

Tom Jicha, television/radio reporter for the Sun-Sentinel, suggests in his review that the comedy should be renamed 'Payne-ful', adding: 'Let's be clear about this; Payne is not a bad show because it doesn't stand up to Fawlty Towers. It is a bad show, period.' Entertainment critic Kinney Littlefield provided an equally blunt appraisal on behalf of the Orange County Register: 'The original Fawlty Towers (1975/79) was wicked fun. Payne is just plain dumb. It is written for morons.' Other national and regional newspapers also issued disparaging reviews, a few being in USA Today, The Atlanta Constitution, The Sun, The Boston Globe, Cincinnati Enquirer, the Chicago Tribune, and the New York Post, which featured a bold heading for a review by Michele Greppi, proclaiming 'Original Fawlty Still Towers Over This Clumsy Knock-Off'.

John Allemang, the television critic for The Globe and Mail, summed up his opinion of Payne in the title of his review dated March 17: 'TV comedy inflicts Payne and suffering.' "Fawlty Towers it's not", he asserted, explaining that '"Payne"'s basic structure and its less 'dangerous' comedic tone belie any serious comparison of the American series to its British predecessor:

In the 22-minute format, with short scenes that go nowhere, the visceral terrors of Fawlty Towers become simple misunderstandings. Nothing is wounding or dangerous, no one's going to snap and every problem is quickly resolved. In this happy-face California version, even the hotel has become comfortable and immaculate. "Payne"'s producers are so confident their show will last that they plan to give Cleese a role once the series gets established. He will play Payne's rival in the hotel trade and — we're in America now — he will be the nicest man in the world.'

Payne did have some supporters in the media. In his assessment in Variety, syndicated entertainment critic Ray Richmond described it as an 'agreeably over-the-top farce' with performances that make it 'more than just another Brit-inspired rip-off'. He also referred to Larroquette as 'one of TV's comedy treasures' and noted that he and JoBeth Williams displayed 'a surprisingly tasty chemistry' as wise-cracking spouses. After watching a preview of the series on March 11, Richmond observes: 'Subsequent episodes, screened from a review tape, slide somewhat in quality and level of laughs, but not enough to dampen the enthusiasm for a sitcom that so enthusiastically embraces its own sense of stupidity and refuses to let go., Manuel Mendoza, of the Dallas Morning News, was also a fan of Payne, at least of Larroquette's performance after seeing the series' initial broadcast: 'John Larroquette strikes just the right balance between Mr. Cleese's unreconstructed near-sociopath and the typical American-sitcom bad boy.' Additional positive comments about the show could be found in the Detroit Free Press, the New York Daily News, the St. Louis Post-Dispatch, The Tampa Tribune, and Pittsburgh Post-Gazette. Still, most of those supportive comments registered as mild compliments, not avid endorsements. For example, the Detroit Free Press reported on March 15 that 'in moments...Payne can be lightly enjoyable'; while Walt Belcher, of The Tampa Tribune, admitted in his review that the series was "not as hilarious as Fawlty Towers" but 'it shows potential'.
