= Amanda's =

- Also known as: Amanda's by the Sea
- Created by: Elliot Shoenman
- Based on: Fawlty Towers by: John Cleese; Connie Booth; (uncredited)
- Directed by: Marc Daniels; Charles S. Dubin; J.D. Lobue; John Rich; Howard Storm
- Starring: Beatrice Arthur; Fred McCarren; Simone Griffeth; Tony Rosato; Rick Hurst; Keene Curtis; Kevin McCarthy
- Theme music composer: Lois Walden
- Composers: Artie Butler; Peter Matz
- Country of origin: United States
- Original language: English
- No. of seasons: 1
- No. of episodes: 13 (3 unaired)

Production
- Executive producer: Len Rosenberg
- Producers: Elliot Shoenman; Allan Manings
- Camera setup: Multi-camera
- Running time: 30 minutes
- Production companies: E&L Productions; Viacom Productions

Original release
- Network: ABC
- Release: February 10 – May 26, 1983

Related
- Fawlty Towers

Amanda's (also known as Amanda's by the Sea) is an American sitcom television series created by Elliot Shoenman, and that aired on ABC from February 10 to May 26, 1983.. It was loosely inspired by the 1970s British sitcom Fawlty Towers, although it is not officially a direct remake of the show despite numerous similarities. The series starred Bea Arthur as Amanda Cartwright, who owns a seaside hotel called "Amanda's by the Sea" and was Arthur's first return to series television since her sitcom Maude ended in 1978.

Thirteen episodes were produced, with three remaining unaired following the series' cancellation.

== Synopsis ==
Amanda Cartwright (Bea Arthur) is the formidable and often sarcastic owner of "Amanda's by the Sea", a struggling California seaside hotel overlooking the Pacific Ocean. Her staff includes her generally level-headed hotel-management-graduate son Marty (Fred McCarren); her spoiled daughter-in-law Arlene, who doesn't actually seem to do any work (Simone Griffeth); bumbling (but very qualified) Louisiana chef Earl (Rick Hurst) and Aldo, the bellhop of indeterminate foreign origin (although Amanda claims he's from Toronto) who speaks almost no English, and somehow understands even less (Tony Rosato). Michael Constantine was in the opening credits of the pilot as Krisnky, the scheming owner of a competing hotel ("Casa Krinsky") who wants to buy Amanda's and tear it down. The character, initially meant to be a regular, was dropped after the pilot. Beginning with episode 3, Keene Curtis joined the cast as Clifford Mundy, a by-the-book banker who holds the mortgage on Amanda's-by-the-Sea and takes up residence at the inn to keep an eye on the bank's investment. Later, starting with episode 7 in broadcast order, Kevin McCarthy is added to the cast as Zack Cartwright, the brother of Amanda's late husband Harry who returns home after spending 15 adventurous years in Africa. Zack and Amanda begin a relationship, and in the final episode as broadcast, become engaged. In the initially unbroadcast series finale, the two actually marry.

The farcical comedy of the first six episodes revolved around mistaken identities, fussy guests, epic misunderstandings, overbookings, Earl's eccentric cooking, and the banker Mr. Mundy, who constantly threatened to foreclose. Later episodes, once brother-in-law Zack showed up, were slightly less frantic and farcical (though farce and slapstick remained central elements of the show), and instead focused more on the developing relationship between Zack and Amanda.

== Production ==
Amanda's is the second attempted American adaptation of Fawlty Towers. The first, Snavely (also known as Chateau Snavely) starring Harvey Korman and Betty White, was produced by ABC for a pilot in 1978, but the transfer from coastal hotel to highway motel proved too much and additional episodes were never filmed after the completion and review of that pilot. John Cleese, co-creator of the original British sitcom, was critical of this first adaptation, in particular Korman and White, saying they "played it too slow and were embarrassed by the edgy dialogue".

Amanda's is a much looser adaptation of Fawlty Towers -- arguably, not an adaptation as much as a series that draws inspiration from Fawlty Towers rather than adapting it wholesale. Aside from Amanda's hotel setting (which is designed in a strikingly similar manner to Fawlty Towers) and the character of Aldo's very obvious similarities to the Fawlty Towers character of Manuel, Amanda's otherwise has a very different set of principal characters and character relationships. As well, no episode of Amanda's is a remake of any Fawlty Towers episode; the plots in each series are different. Notably, Amanda's does not credit Fawlty Towers creators John Cleese or Connie Booth in any capacity whatsoever.

Amanda's was created by Elliot Shoenman, who had previously written six episodes of Arthur's 1970s sitcom Maude. Since Maude concluded in 1978, Arthur had been approached with numerous ideas until Shoenman showed her some tapes of Fawlty Towers. Loving the original, Arthur agreed to take part in a remake. Later, however, she recalled "complaining bitterly" about the show and, in particular, the plot and character changes. Amanda, unlike her original counterpart Sybil, did not have a husband (she was a widow) but instead had a son and daughter-in-law. Arthur noted the only fundamental similarity between Amanda's and Fawlty Towers was the adaptation of the character Manuel, known in the remake as Aldo. Norman Lear, a friend and former colleague of Arthur's, looked at the sitcom and told Arthur: "You don't have a character...you're not playing anything."

In a 2009 interview, Cleese described the occasion when American television producers spoke to him about their development of Amanda's:

The most extraordinary remake was with Bea Arthur. I remember at a party I met these chaps from Viacom [sic], who said they were working on a new Fawlty Towers. My ears pricked up at the sound of cash registers and said, "That's wonderful, are you going to change anything?" They said, "Well we have changed one thing, we've written Basil out". And that's absolutely true, they took Basil and Sybil's lines and gave them all to Bea Arthur.

Amanda's was taped in front of a live audience at ABC Studios in Hollywood, California. It was canceled in May 1983 after a four-month run of ten episodes, with three unaired episodes remaining. A&E channel broadcast reruns of the show during the late 1980s.

Arthur later described the show as "a big disappointment". Two years after the cancellation of Amanda's, Arthur was cast in the sitcom The Golden Girls.

A third remake of Fawlty Towers, titled Payne, was developed sixteen years after Amanda's ended. Produced by and starring John Larroquette, the CBS series was cancelled after the broadcast of its eighth episode on April 28, 1999.

== Cast ==
- Bea Arthur as Amanda Wilkerson Cartwright
- Fred McCarren as Martin "Marty" Cartwright
- Simone Griffeth as Arlene Cartwright
- Tony Rosato as Aldo
- Rick Hurst as Earl Nash
- Keene Curtis as Clifford Mundy (beginning with episode 3)
- Kevin McCarthy as Zack Cartwright (episodes 7-10, 13)

== Episodes ==
No.	Title	Directed by	Written by	Original release date
1	"All in a Day's Work"	John Rich	Elliot Shoenman	February 10, 1983
Amanda is forced to contend frantically with an overbooking problem, a defunct kitchen cooking range and a disgruntled hotel-business magazine writer. Though an original story, this episode contains situations and dialogue references taken from several episodes of Fawlty Towers, including "The Hotel Inspectors", "The Germans", and "Communication Problems".
2	"You Were Meant For Me"	Charles S. Dubin	Elliot Shoenman	February 17, 1983
When an ex-con (Donnelly Rhodes) holds the staff and guests hostage in the hotel lobby, both he and the chief of police (Jerry Stiller) make a play for Amanda.
3	"The Man Who Came on Wednesday"	Charles S. Dubin	Elliot Shoenman	February 24, 1983
Amanda's party plans are interrupted when she has to pass off a bunch of country bumpkins as pillars of the community to welcome the town's new bank president.
4	"I Ain't Got Nobody"	J.D. Lobue	Harvey Silberman	March 3, 1983
Amanda panics when she and Aldo desperately try to keep up with a corpse that mysteriously turns up in various guest rooms.
5	"My Cheatin' Staff"	J.D. Lobue	John Markus	March 10, 1983
Aldo falls for a gorgeous airline stewardess (Ann Gillespie) while Marty and Arlene suspect Amanda of having an affair with Aldo and a married hotel guest.
6	"Aunt Sonia"	Marc Daniels	Sam Greenbaum	March 24, 1983
Amanda plays matchmaker for her visiting aunt Sonia (Vivian Blaine) amid a golf tournament, a shortage of rooms and a dancing chicken in the cabaret.
7	"Last of the Red Hot Brothers"	Howard Storm	Diane Wilk & Neal Marlens	May 5, 1983
Amanda's emotions range from elation to fury with a surprise visit from her brother-in-law Zack during a financial crisis at the hotel.
8	"I'm Dancing as Close as I Can"	Howard Storm	Bill Davenport & Sam Greenbaum	May 12, 1983
Amanda's temper flares when Zack begins meddling in the hotel's affairs, then she breaks out with a case of the hives when he asks her out on a date.
9	"One Passionate Night (Part 1)"	Howard Storm	Michael Loman	May 19, 1983
A full moon has the hotel staff feeling quite passionate, which results in some strange bedfellows – especially for Amanda and Zack.
10	"One Passionate Night: The Aftermath (Part 2)"	Howard Storm	Michael Loman	May 26, 1983
Marty takes Amanda to task when it becomes clear to him that she and his Uncle Zack have become romantically involved.
11	"Amanda's Number One Son"	Howard Storm	Karyl Geld Miller	Unaired
Amanda is in dire straits after Marty is lured away from working at the hotel and receives a job offer from his father-in-law to work in Boston. This episode (as well as the next episode) was produced earlier in the show's run, and takes place in the series continuity after episode 3 but before episode 7.
12	"I Was Wild About Harry"	Howard Storm	Elliot Shoenman	Unaired
Amanda tries to organize a luau in honor of her late husband, but the weather insists on being anything but Hawaiian.
13	"Oh, Promise Me"	Howard Storm	Clayton Baxter (s/t); Susan Borowitz & Richard Raskind (t)	Unaired
Wedding bells are ringing for Amanda and Zack, but first they must banish the ghost of Amanda's first husband Barney (Billy Sands). This episode, the series finale, carries on directly from episode 10.

== Broadcast history ==
Dates	Time slot (ET)
February 10 – March 24, 1983	Thursday, 8:00–8:30 PM on ABC (Episodes 1–6)
May 5–26, 1983	Thursday, 9:30–10:00 PM on ABC (Episodes 7–10)

The series was shown in Italy, under the title Amanda in the 1980s on Rete 4. It was also shown in Sweden from June 15, 1984.

== U.S. television ratings ==
Season	Episodes	Start date	End date	Nielsen rank	Nielsen rating
1982–83	10	February 10, 1983	May 26, 1983	54	N/A
