= The Germans =

- Fawlty Towers episode
- Basil Fawlty does the "funny walk", offending the German visitors
- Episode no.: Series 1 Episode 6
- Directed by: John Howard Davies
- Written by: John Cleese; Connie Booth
- Editing by: Bob Rymer
- Original air date: 24 October 1975
- Running time: 35 minutes

Guest appearances
- Lisa Bergmayr as German Guest; Willy Bowman as German Guest; Brenda Cowling as Sister; Claire Davenport as Miss Wilson; Iris Fry as Mrs Sharp; Dan Gillan as German Guest; Nick Kane as German Guest; John Lawrence as Mr Sharp; Louis Mahoney as Doctor Finn

Episode chronology
← Previous "Gourmet Night"	Next → "Communication Problems"

"The Germans" is the sixth and final episode of the first series of the British television sitcom Fawlty Towers. Written by John Cleese and Connie Booth and directed by John Howard Davies, it was first broadcast on BBC2 on 24 October 1975.

The episode revolves around Basil's attempts to successfully run the hotel alone while Sybil is in hospital. During a fire drill, a real fire begins in the hotel kitchen, resulting in Basil becoming concussed. Discharging himself from hospital, Basil arrives in time to greet a party of German guests, but he is unable to hide his anti-German sentiment towards them.

The episode features on several "best of" episode lists and is one of the most popular episodes in the series. Conversely, it has attracted controversy for its themes of anti-German sentiment and use of racial slurs. It was removed from the UKTV streaming platform in 2020, though later reinstated.

== Plot ==
Sybil, in hospital for a few days for an ingrowing toenail, instructs Basil on tasks including running a fire drill and hanging a moose head. At the hotel, Basil has a conversation with the senile Major Gowen, who expresses anti-German sentiment when Basil tells him that a German group is due the next day. Major Gowen discusses other nationalities, using the racial slurs "wogs" and "niggers".

Basil attempts to hang the moose head with Manuel, but is interrupted by Sybil calling him to remind him to do so. When Basil leaves the head on the reception desk to fetch a hammer, Manuel practises his English from behind the desk, leading an astonished Major Gowen to think that the moose head is talking.

The next morning, Basil successfully mounts the head but accidentally sets off a burglar alarm before the fire drill, creating confusion among the guests who mistake it for the fire alarm. Manuel causes a real fire in the kitchen, prompting Basil to resume the fire drill. He attempts to use a fire extinguisher, but it sprays him in the face. Manuel accidentally knocks out Basil with a frying pan.

Basil wakes up in hospital with concussion, and Sybil tells her doctor, Dr Finn, that Basil cannot cope with the hotel alone. Basil sneaks out and returns to Fawlty Towers in time to greet the German guests. Despite telling everyone not to "mention the war" his injury prompts him to make numerous World War II references while taking the guests' lunch orders. He begins arguing with them, mentioning Adolf Hitler, Hermann Göring, Joseph Goebbels, Eva Braun and Joachim von Ribbentrop. Polly discreetly calls the hospital to warn them about Basil's behaviour.

As one of the Germans starts weeping, Basil jokes about a Royal Air Force bomber and performs a goose stepping impression of Hitler. Dr Finn arrives with a sedative needle, prompting Basil to flee with Manuel also giving chase. However, Basil runs into the wall where he had hung the moose head, which falls, knocks him out again, and lands on Manuel's head. As the stunned Germans look on, Major Gowen enters the room and launches into a conversation with what he still believes is a talking moose head. The Germans shake their heads and one says, "How ever did they win?"

== Cast ==
=== Main ===
- John Cleese as Basil Fawlty
- Prunella Scales as Sybil Fawlty
- Andrew Sachs as Manuel
- Connie Booth as Polly Sherman
- Ballard Berkeley as Major Gowen
- Gilly Flower as Miss Abitha Tibbs
- Renee Roberts as Miss Ursula Gatsby

=== Guest ===
- Lisa Bergmayr as German Guest
- Willy Bowman as German Guest
- Brenda Cowling as Sister
- Claire Davenport as Miss Wilson
- Iris Fry as Mrs Sharp
- Dan Gillan as German Guest
- Nick Kane as German Guest
- John Lawrence as Mr Sharp
- Louis Mahoney as Doctor Finn

== Production ==
Interior scenes of this episode were recorded on 31 August 1975, in Studio TC6 of the BBC Television Centre, before a live audience. It was the only episode not to begin with an exterior shot of the hotel. Instead, an exterior shot of the Northwick Park Hospital in Brent was used.

In the scene where Manuel attempts to put out a fire in the kitchen, firemen were on standby to put out the flames. However, in the next shot where Manuel walks out to alert Basil of the fire, two chemicals were added to his arm, to create smoke. During rehearsal and filming, these chemicals soaked into his clothing, causing Andrew Sachs second degree chemical burns on his arm and back. As a result, the BBC paid Sachs damages worth £700.

Co-writer John Cleese claims that he "never think[s] the second half of 'The Germans' is as well written as all that". Although the first half is "written beautifully", Cleese believes the second half has "several things" wrong with it. Cleese cites in particular the fire drill scene as a favourite: "It's a situation when two people are trying to understand each other and just missing each other's meaning."

== Cultural impact ==
This episode popularised the phrase "Don't mention the war". Cleese turned the phrase into a song, "Don't Mention the World Cup", for the 2006 FIFA World Cup, the first time Cleese had played Basil Fawlty in twenty-seven years. The phrase was used as a title for a humorous travel book written by Stewart Ferris and Paul Bassett, detailing travels through Germany and other European countries. It is also the title of a book by John Ramsden, published in 2006, which examines Anglo-German relations since 1890, and a 2005 Radio 4 documentary looking at the British perception of Germans.

In the first episode of the second series of the BBC series The Office, David Brent performs an impression of a paper industry figure as Basil Fawlty, quoting the phrase "Don't mention the war", and impersonating the goose step used by Basil.

== Home media releases ==
In 1982, an LP record containing the episodes "The Kipper and the Corpse" and "The Germans" was released by BBC Records. Titled Fawlty Towers: At Your Service, the LP was the third record released by the BBC. The episodes were renamed "Death" and "Fire Drill" for the release, respectively.

== Reception ==
This episode has been listed on several "best episode" lists and is one of the most popular episodes in the series. In 1997, "The Germans" was ranked No. 12 on TV Guide's 100 Greatest Episodes of All Time. It was voted as number 11 in Channel 4's One Hundred Greatest TV Moments in 1999. Empire magazine listed this as the best episode of the show in its list of the 50 greatest TV episodes of all time. The American film director Martin Scorsese called it his favourite episode of Fawlty Towers. Gold, a channel that regularly broadcasts Fawlty Towers, argued that while "The Germans" is the most famous episode, the best episode is "Communication Problems". Morris Bright and Robert Ross, in their 2001 Fawlty Towers history book, wrote that if you "ask anyone who's watched Fawlty Towers which episode they recall more than any other and most will nominate 'The Germans', usually followed by cries of 'Don't mention the war!' and visions of Basil strutting around like a Pythonesque Nazi".

=== German response ===
In 1993, Germany began broadcasting Fawlty Towers on cable television. These airings proved to be a "tremendous success" with ratings, and "The Germans" proved to be one of the most popular episodes shown in the country. A German spokesman at the time reported that German viewers were "most keen" on the slapstick elements within the series and specifically stated that the "'don't mention the war' scene did not cause offense". Cleese later recalled a "terrific" occasion in Hamburg when a German fan shouted "Hey, Mr Cleese, don't mention zee war!" Cleese recalled: "It's taken a little time, but I felt really good about that. That chap had got the whole point of the episode." However, when the German adaptation of the series was created in 2001, this episode was omitted from the storylines.

== Controversy ==
"The Germans" has been evaluated by critics in the context of stoking anti-German sentiment. Journalist Mark Lawson expressed the view that, "while the show will never win a prize for encouraging Anglo-German cultural understanding, Cleese is comically depicting – rather than politically promoting – fear of 'Fritz'". In response to critics, John Cleese stated that his intention in writing this episode was "to make fun of English Basil Fawltys who are buried in the past" and "to make fun of the British obsession with the Second World War".

In 2013, the BBC edited the Major's use of racial slurs from a repeat transmission of the episode, prompting some criticism by viewers. The BBC defended its decision: "We are very proud of Fawlty Towers and its contribution to British television comedy. But public attitudes have changed significantly since it was made and it was decided to make some minor changes, with the consent of John Cleese's management, to allow the episode to transmit to a family audience at 7.30pm on BBC Two."

The episode was removed from the UKTV streaming service on 11 June 2020 in the wake of the George Floyd protests, with the other episodes of Fawlty Towers remaining available on the service. Cleese spoke against the removal of the episode due to the Major's use of racial slurs: "The Major was an old fossil left over from decades before. We were not supporting his views, we were making fun of them. If they can't see that, if people are too stupid to see that, what can one say?" On 13 June, it was reinstated by UKTV with a warning about "offensive content and language".

== Stage adaptation ==
This episode, along with "The Hotel Inspectors" and "Communication Problems", was adapted into a stage play by John Cleese and director Caroline Jay Ranger. Titled Fawlty Towers Live, the stage play went on tour in Australia in 2016. The three episodes's plot were merged into one storyline. In 2024, the play, retitled Fawlty Towers: The Play, made its debut in the West End.
