= Donald Sinclair (hotel owner) =

British hotel owner (1909–1981)

- Sinclair and his wife Beatrice
- Born: Donald William Sinclair; 10 July 1909; Ireland
- Died: 5 September 1981 (aged 72); Torquay, England
- Occupations: Merchant naval officer, Naval officer, Hotelier
- Known for: Being the inspiration for the fictional character Basil Fawlty
- Spouse: Beatrice Coutts Ritchie (m. 1940)
- Children: 2
- Military career
- Allegiance: United Kingdom
- Branch: Royal Navy
- Service years: 1939–1946
- Rank: Lieutenant commander
- Conflicts: World War II: Battle of the Atlantic; Battle of Madagascar; Operation Torch

Donald William Sinclair (10 July 1909 – 5 September 1981) was an British naval officer and hotel owner. He was the co-proprietor of the Gleneagles Hotel in Torquay in Devon. He helped manage the hotel after an extensive career as an officer in the Merchant Navy and the Royal Navy. During the Second World War, Sinclair twice survived the sinking of the ships on which he was serving.

Sinclair was the inspiration for the character Basil Fawlty, played by John Cleese, in the television sitcom Fawlty Towers that Cleese co-wrote. This was owing to Sinclair's allegedly stuffy, snobbish and eccentric treatment of his guests, including Cleese and other members of the Monty Python cast. Cleese later played a character named Donald Sinclair in the 2001 film Rat Race.

== Wartime career ==
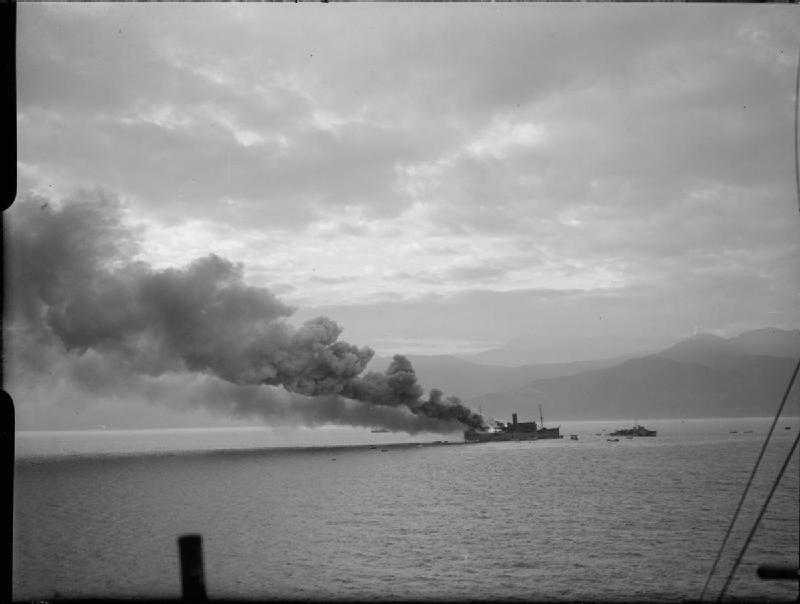
Sinclair's ship, HMS Karanja, on fire in the harbour at Bougie, Algeria, prior to sinking, November 1942

Before the Second World War, Donald Sinclair was in the Merchant Navy. As an officer in the Royal Naval Reserve, he was called up in September 1939 for military service.

Soon after his call up, Sinclair joined the crew of the armed merchant cruiser HMS Salopian, a pre-war cargo liner that had been armed and converted into a warship. On 13 May 1941, Salopian was escorting a convoy in the North Atlantic, 400 miles south of Greenland, when she was attacked by U-98 in heavy fog. During successive attacks in the following six hours, Salopian was hit four times by torpedoes. Her engines were knocked out but she remained afloat and engaged the surfaced U-98 with gunfire. She finally sank after a fifth torpedo broke her in half. All but three of the crew survived and were picked up the next day by the destroyers HMS Impulsive and HMS Icarus.

In July 1941, Sinclair joined the crew of the infantry landing ship HMS Karanja. In May 1942, Karanja took part in Operation Ironclad, the British invasion of Vichy French-controlled Madagascar. In November 1942, she took part in Operation Torch, the Allied invasion of French North Africa. On the morning of 12 November, at Bougie, French Algeria, Karanja was hit in the engine room by at least two bombs from a German Junkers Ju 88 bomber and caught fire before sinking.

From February 1943 to July 1945, Sinclair served on the escort carrier HMS Trumpeter, whose duties included escorting convoys to the Soviet Union. With the end of the war in Europe, the ship was reassigned to the Far East and arrived in Colombo in July 1945. Trumpeter was one of the ships assigned to take part in Operation Zipper, the recapture of British Malaya, but the ending of the war meant only a small part of the planned attack was carried out.

Sinclair left the navy in April 1946 with the rank of paymaster lieutenant commander.

== Hotel career and later life ==
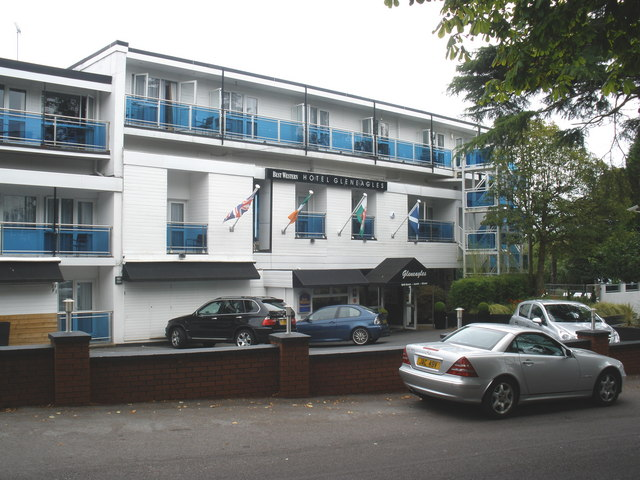
The Gleneagles Hotel, Torquay, in 2009

Sinclair married Beatrice Ritchie (1915–2010) in Glasgow in 1940. She was a policeman's daughter from Ellon, Aberdeenshire, who worked as a fashion consultant and designer at a Glasgow department store. She moved to Torquay to live with an aunt and avoid the German bombing of Glasgow.

After the war ended, while her husband was still serving at sea, Beatrice opened a hotel in Torquay called Greenacres. The business was a success and she bought a private house that she transformed into a second hotel. She named this Gleneagles after her favourite part of her native Scotland. By this time, her husband was assisting her in running the business. He made this decision reluctantly and would have preferred to remain at sea. The Gleneagles Hotel was a heavily-modified, older building that began taking guests in 1963. It gained a four-star hotel rating and was complimented in guidebooks for the standard of accommodation it offered. The Sinclairs ran the hotel until they sold it in 1973.

Donald Sinclair died at his home, Compass South, in Ilsham Marine Drive in Torquay, on 5 September 1981, at the age of 72. According to The Spectator, his death, from a heart attack and stroke, resulted from an event in August when "some workmen he'd upset painted his patio furniture and car gunmetal grey during the night". The workmen in question were later sentenced to four months in jail for property damage. Beatrice died 29 years later in September 2010; they are survived by their two daughters.

The Gleneagles Hotel became a part of the Best Western hotel chain. It closed in February 2015 and the building was later demolished.

== Fawlty Towers ==
In May 1970, the cast of Monty Python's Flying Circus met the Sinclairs while staying at the Gleneagles Hotel; they were filming in nearby Paignton. Sinclair was reluctant to let them stay, but his wife argued in favour of them as their three-week stay in the hotel represented a considerable amount of business during the hotel's off-season. Sinclair's actions included criticising American Terry Gilliam's table etiquette and taking Eric Idle's briefcase out to the back of the hotel car park, because he thought it contained a bomb. The cast, with the exception of John Cleese and his wife Connie Booth, left the hotel for other accommodation. Cleese later used Sinclair's mannerisms as an inspiration for Basil Fawlty in Fawlty Towers. The Gleneagles Hotel is referenced in the show's second episode, "The Builders".

Cleese later played eccentric hotel owners in the 1999 remake film The Out-of-Towners and the 2001 movie Rat Race; in the latter film, his character was called Donald Sinclair.

=== Accuracy ===
Opinions are divided on how closely Fawlty resembled Sinclair. Former staff and visitors at the Gleneagles Hotel recall actual events there that were as ludicrous as those depicted in the series. At least one former employee described Sinclair as "worse than Basil Fawlty, much worse". However, Sinclair's family is adamant that Fawlty was an inaccurate caricature. Beatrice later described her husband as a "gentleman and a very brave man" and not "the neurotic eccentric that John Cleese made him out to be". An accuracy she did acknowledge was that she was very much in charge of the business, just as Basil Fawlty was usually subordinate to his wife Sybil. The publication in 2006 of Diaries 1969–1979: The Python Years, written by Michael Palin, supported Cleese's assessment of the Sinclairs. Rosemary Harrison, a waitress at the Gleneagles under Sinclair, stated:

Fawlty Towers was terribly funny. John Cleese exaggerated the character but the basic things are there. He probably wasn't neurotic, but he was just so bad-tempered. It was as if he didn't want the guests to be there. He was bonkers. He thought it ridiculous that people wanted to drink at lunchtime. These were paying guests. They would be out by the pool looking for a drink and he hadn't opened the bar. He just wasn't cut out for the hotel business.
