= Hotel Inspector =

Hotel inspector may refer to:

- Health inspector for hotels
- The Hotel Inspector, a television programme in the United Kingdom
  - The Hotel Inspector Unseen, spinoff TV show
- "The Hotel Inspectors", fourth episode of Fawlty Towers
- "Hotel Inspector" (The Suite Life of Zack & Cody), a season 1 episode
- "Hotel Inspector", an episode of the Indian adaptation The Suite Life of Karan & Kabir

== See also ==
- Hotel detective, a detective that works for a hotel
