= Gleneagles Hotel, Torquay =

Hotel in England (1963–2015)

Gleneagles Hotel
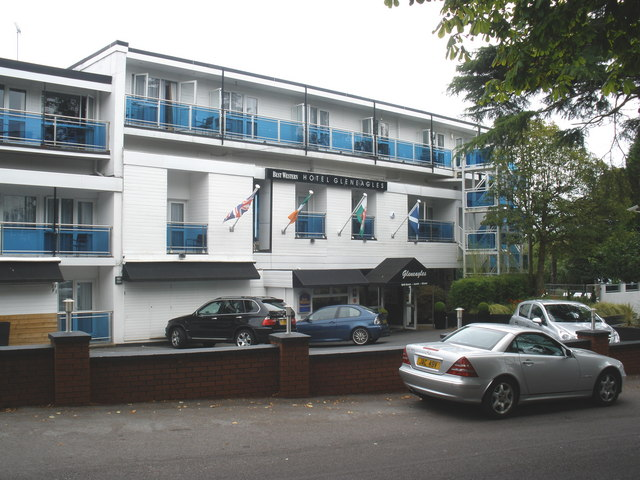
- The hotel in 2009
- Interactive map of the Gleneagles Hotel area
- Alternative names: Best Western Gleneagles Hotel

General information
- Architectural style: Modern
- Coordinates: 50°28′11″N 3°30′13.5″W
- Opened: 1963; 63 years ago
- Closed: February 2015; 11 years ago

Technical details
- Floor count: 3

Other information
- Number of rooms: 41
- Parking: 28

The Gleneagles Hotel was a hotel in Torquay, Devon, England. The 41-bed establishment, which opened in the 1960s, was the inspiration for Fawlty Towers, a British situation comedy first broadcast in the mid-1970s. John Cleese and his then wife Connie Booth were inspired to write the series after they had stayed at the hotel, where they witnessed the eccentric behaviour of its co-owner, Donald Sinclair, who ran the hotel with his wife Beatrice until they sold it in 1973. The hotel was later managed by Best Western. It closed in February 2015 and was replaced by retirement apartments.

== History ==
The Gleneagles was not originally built as a hotel but was modified to become one. The hotel was first opened in 1963 and was managed by Beatrice Sinclair and her husband, Donald. It was initially described as "upmarket" because it advertised private bathrooms in every room. It gained a four-star hotel rating and was complimented in guidebooks for the standard of accommodation it offered.

In the early 1970s, cast members of Monty Python's Flying Circus stayed at the Gleneagles for a planned three weeks while filming in Paignton. Due to Donald Sinclair's rudeness towards them, which included criticising Terry Gilliam's "too American" table etiquette and tossing Eric Idle's briefcase out of a window "in case it contained a bomb", the cast left the hotel apart from John Cleese and his wife, Connie Booth. Cleese described the owner as "the most marvellously rude man I've ever met" and based his Basil Fawlty character on him when he and Booth created Fawlty Towers five years later.

While Donald Sinclair became known for his eccentric and rude behaviour, Beatrice Sinclair remained the driving force behind the hotel and was responsible for making it a successful business. The couple sold Gleneagles in 1973 and it eventually became a part of the Best Western hotel chain. For the rest of its existence, the hotel retained a reminder of their legacy: the 41 rooms all had names such as Coral or Mimosa. This was introduced in the Sinclair era of Gleneagles. Many guests were fans of Fawlty Towers who had travelled specifically just to experience staying at the hotel.

In August 2003, developers submitted plans to demolish the hotel and build a block of flats on the site, claiming the building was "unattractive with little architectural merit". In October, Torbay Town Council rejected the application, stating that it would be against its rules of tourism. In September 2006, Prunella Scales, who played Sybil Fawlty, was "guest of honour" at the reopening of the hotel after a £1 million makeover.

After the hotel was closed permanently in February 2015, permission was given in November 2015 to demolish the hotel and replace it with retirement apartments built by Churchill Retirement Living. The development was named Sachs Lodge in memory of Andrew Sachs who played Manuel in the sitcom and who died in 2016.

== In popular culture ==
The Gleneagles Hotel is mentioned in "The Builders" episode of Fawlty Towers as a suggestion for alternative dinner arrangements for the guests while the Fawlty Towers hotel was undergoing renovations.
