= The Hotel Inspectors =

- Fawlty Towers episode
- Episode no.: Series 1 Episode 4
- Directed by: John Howard Davies
- Written by: John Cleese; Connie Booth
- Original air date: 10 October 1975
- Running time: 35 minutes

Guest appearances
- Bernard Cribbins as Mr. Hutchinson; James Cossins as Mr. Walt; Peter Brett as Brian, The Hotel Inspector; Geoffrey Morris as John, The Hotel Inspector; Lewis Alexander as Chris, The Hotel Inspector (uncredited)

Episode chronology
← Previous "The Wedding Party"	Next → "Gourmet Night"

"The Hotel Inspectors" is the fourth episode of the first series of the British television sitcom Fawlty Towers. Written by John Cleese and Connie Booth and directed by John Howard Davies, it was first broadcast on BBC2 on 10 October 1975.

The episode revolves around the arrival of two guests, Mr. Hutchinson and Mr. Walt. When Sybil receives a phone call from a friend, warning her of the presence of hotel inspectors in the area, Basil must decide which of his new guests could be the inspector.

The episode has been cited as having borrowed plot elements from Nikolai Gogol's The Government Inspector. Bernard Cribbins's performance as Mr. Hutchinson has been widely praised. The episode was later adapted into a stage play.

== Plot ==
Two guests, Mr. Walt and Mr. Hutchinson, arrive separately at reception. Whilst Mr. Walt is quiet and reserved, Mr. Hutchinson immediately irritates Basil by making several awkward requests and asks for specific directions to a meeting. As Mr. Hutchinson leaves for the dining area, Sybil enters the lobby and informs Basil that, whilst on the phone, a friend of Audrey's told her about the presence of three hotel inspectors in the area. Suddenly anxious, Basil becomes determined to work out who the inspectors are. He realises with horror that any of the guests he has been serving could be one of them.

Returning to the lobby, Mr. Hutchinson makes a request to reserve the television to watch a documentary, explaining that he is in "constant contact with hotels", causing Basil to believe that Mr. Hutchinson is the hotel inspector. Basil thus changes his attitude towards Hutchinson, fawning over him. He escorts him to the dining room, where lunch is about to be served. Basil ends up neglecting Mr. Walt, who is forced to wait after his bottle of Aloxe-Corton wine proves to be corked. Meanwhile, Sybil quietly reveals to Basil that she overhead a telephone conversation held by Mr. Hutchinson, and discovered that Mr. Hutchinson is not an inspector but a cutlery salesman. Feeling conned, Basil swears revenge on Hutchinson. However, during a conversation with Basil, Mr. Walt casually mentions that he is in Torquay "on business with two colleagues". This convinces Basil that Walt is the inspector. In order to avoid making a poor impression on Walt, Basil attempts to pacify Hutchinson, who is annoyed after several instances of table-switching had caused confusion in the kitchen and led to Hutchinson being served several dishes he did not order. To stifle Hutchinson's complaining, Basil gags him and then subtly punches him, rendering him unconscious.

Hutchinson regains consciousness and begins punching Basil at the reception desk. As they are in the presence of Mr. Walt, Basil accepts the assault without retaliation. Hutchinson leaves in anger to collect his bags. Basil attempts to bribe Mr. Walt from mentioning the recent chain of events in his review. However, Mr. Walt reveals he is actually an outboard motors salesman and consoles Basil. Basil thanks Walt and runs to the kitchen with Manuel. They prevent Mr. Hutchinson from leaving, and assault him with pies to Mr. Hutchinson's face and crotch, and cream poured into his briefcase. Basil frogmarches Mr. Hutchinson to the door and throws him out of the hotel. Returning to the reception desk, Basil welcomes three smartly-dressed businessmen who have witnessed the ejection of Hutchinson and screams in terror as he realises that they are the hotel inspectors.

== Cast ==
=== Main ===
- John Cleese as Basil Fawlty
- Prunella Scales as Sybil Fawlty
- Andrew Sachs as Manuel
- Connie Booth as Polly Sherman
- Ballard Berkeley as Major Gowen
- Gilly Flower as Miss Abitha Tibbs
- Renee Roberts as Miss Ursula Gatsby

=== Guest ===
- Bernard Cribbins as Mr. Hutchinson
- James Cossins as Mr. Walt
- Peter Brett as Brian, The Hotel Inspector
- Geoffrey Morris as John, The Hotel Inspector
- Lewis Alexander as Chris, The Hotel Inspector (uncredited)

== Production ==
Interior scenes for this episode were recorded on 27 August 1975, in Studio TC8 of the BBC Television Centre, before a live audience.

Co-writer John Cleese claimed that, in this episode, the viewer "really see[s] what an awful man Basil is". Cleese explained: "[This is] because he has no interest at all in other human beings as human beings." In being "painfully aware" that he must have a successful hotel recommendation, yet not knowing who the hotel inspector may be, this "really created an opportunity for the character to switch from one way of addressing a guest to another and back again without any kind of consistency".

== Home media releases ==
In 1979, an LP record containing the episodes "Communication Problems" (retitled "Mrs. Richards" on the release) and "The Hotel Inspectors" was released by BBC Records. Titled Fawlty Towers, the LP was the first Fawlty Towers-related record released by the BBC. Producer and director John Howard Davies had spent six months persuading the BBC to release audio versions of the series. At first, the BBC believed that it was a "very bad idea" and that the record would not sell. Eventually, the BBC decided to produce the record, hiring John Lloyd as the record's producer. Davies wrote the sleeve notes and Andrew Sachs wrote and performed linking narration for the episodes, in character as Manuel. Upon release, the record earned a profit of £100,000 and, according to authors Morris Bright and Robert Ross, "remains something of a collector's item".

in 1981, We Are Most Amused, a compilation LP record containing classic comedy moments, was released to raise money for the Prince's Trust. The record featured a brief scene from "The Hotel Inspectors".

== Reception ==
Wine critic Ben Gilberti of The Washington Post praised the authenticity and "great comedy" of the corked wine scene, writing that the scene "comes ever so close to a slice of real life. The episode has been noted as having drawn inspiration from Nikolai Gogol's similarly themed The Government Inspector: "it is clear they derived the inspiration for The Hotel Inspectors, an episode of the classic Fawlty Towers, from the work of a 19th century Ukranian [sic] writer" Comparisons were drawn between Basil's fawning to the suspected hotel inspector, and the township's actions involving a civil servant that they believe to be "a top man".

Bernard Cribbins's performance as Mr. Hutchinson, described as "a fastidiously irritating guest whose comeuppance had us cheering for Basil", has been praised as being one of the greatest guest performances in the series. Morris Bright and Robert Ross similarly praised Cribbins's performance, writing that "his insistence on every imaginable extra, his yearning for a particular 'televisual feast' and his complaints about shoddy treatment in the dining room, provide some of the best moments in the series". Bright and Ross believe that Cribbins's performance as Mr. Hutchinson is the actor's "best remembered small-screen character".

== Stage adaptation ==
This episode, along with "The Germans" and "Communication Problems", was adapted into a stage play by John Cleese and director Caroline Jay Ranger. Titled Fawlty Towers Live, the stage play went on tour in Australia in 2016. The three episodes's plot were merged into one storyline. In 2024, the play, retitled Fawlty Towers: The Play, made its debut in the West End.
