= Don't Mention the World Cup =

Song

"Don't Mention the World Cup", also titled "Don't Mention the War", is a 2006 song written by Dean Whitbread and Ashley Slater and performed by The First Eleven with John Cleese. Released to coincide with the 2006 FIFA World Cup, it was intended to dissuade supporters of the England national football team from referring to the Second World War while in Germany for the tournament.

== History ==
The song references Cleese's Fawlty Towers character Basil Fawlty's line in "The Germans" episode: "Don't mention the war. I did but I think I got away with it". Cleese released this song as a way to try and change English feelings towards Germans and to move people away from associating Germans with the Second World War. Cleese recorded his lines for the song as Basil Fawlty. German authorities supported the song as a way to dissuade supporters of the England and Australia national football teams from displaying Nazi symbols or gestures during the World Cup. The song was also intended to get England fans to refrain from using rude words towards Germans.

The song also made an allusion to comedian Stan Boardman's German jokes with the line, "They bombed our chip shops". Boardman, who also wrote a World Cup song, "Stan's World Cup Song", stated that he felt Cleese's use of his joke was "very cheeky" and didn't believe that Cleese had a chip shop in his hometown of Weston-Super-Mare.

== Reception ==
"Don't Mention the World Cup" was released on 12 June 2006; however, it failed to chart in the UK Singles Charts. The song was also criticised in 3:AM Magazine, which gave it two stars and stated that "Cleese's flat delivery is Fawlty". Nonetheless, despite lack of UK chart success, press and television coverage was generally favourable. The song was featured on ITV News in a segment on football violence.
