= Fawlty Towers =

British TV sitcom (1975–1979)

- The "Fawlty Towers" sign in the foreground image varied (usually as an anagram) between episodes
- Genre: Sitcom; Farce
- Created by: John Cleese; Connie Booth
- Written by: John Cleese; Connie Booth
- Directed by: John Howard Davies; Bob Spiers
- Starring: John Cleese; Prunella Scales; Andrew Sachs; Connie Booth; Ballard Berkeley; Brian Hall; Renee Roberts; Gilly Flower
- Theme music composer: Dennis Wilson
- Opening theme: "Fawlty Towers"
- Ending theme: "Fawlty Towers"
- Country of origin: United Kingdom
- Original language: English
- No. of series: 2
- No. of episodes: 12

Production
- Producers: John Howard Davies; Douglas Argent
- Editors: Susan Imrie; Bob Rymer; Bill Harris
- Running time: 30–40 minutes
- Production company: BBC

Original release
- Network: BBC Two
- Release: 19 September 1975 – 25 October 1979

Fawlty Towers is a British television sitcom written by John Cleese and Connie Booth, originally broadcast on BBC Two in 1975 and 1979. Two series of six episodes each were made. Set in Fawlty Towers, a dysfunctional hotel in the English seaside town of Torquay in Devon, the series was inspired by the Gleneagles Hotel in Torquay, where Cleese and the rest of the Monty Python group stayed in 1970. The snobby and eccentric owner, Donald Sinclair, was the inspiration for Cleese's character, Basil Fawlty. (Note: Not to be confused with the eccentric Yorkshire vet Donald Sinclair who was the inspiration for the character Siegfried Farnon, in the semi-autobiographical books of James Herriot, adapted for television as All Creatures Great and Small.) The plots centre on Fawlty, the tense, rude and put-upon owner, his bossy wife Sybil (Prunella Scales), the sensible chambermaid Polly (Booth), and the hapless and English-challenged Spanish waiter Manuel (Andrew Sachs). They attempt to run the hotel amidst farcical situations and an array of demanding and eccentric guests and tradespeople.

While some critics initially derided Fawlty Towers, it soon received general acclaim. In 1976 and 1980, it won the British Academy Television Award for Best Scripted Comedy. In 1980, Cleese received the British Academy Television Award for Best Entertainment Performance. The popularity of Fawlty Towers has endured and it is often re-broadcast. The show was ranked first on a list of the 100 Greatest British Television Programmes drawn up by the British Film Institute in 2000. In a 2001 poll conducted by Channel 4, Basil Fawlty was ranked second (to Homer Simpson) on their list of the 100 Greatest TV Characters. In 2019, it was named the greatest-ever British TV sitcom by a panel of comedy experts compiled by the Radio Times. The BBC profile for the series states that "the British sitcom by which all other British sitcoms must be judged, Fawlty Towers withstands multiple viewings, is eminently quotable ('don't mention the war') and stands up to this day as a jewel in the BBC's comedy crown."

== Origins ==
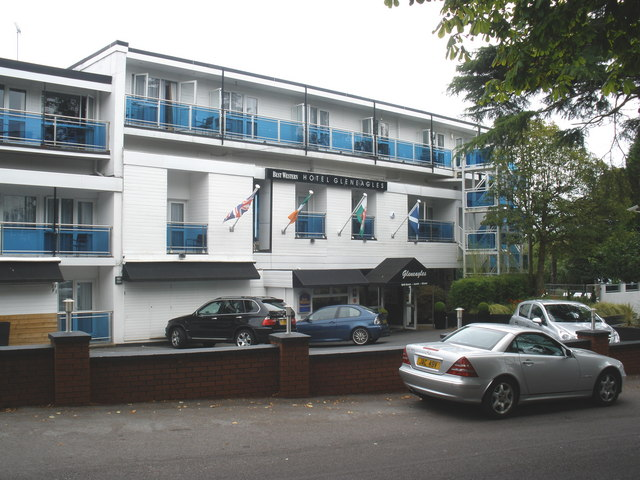
Gleneagles Hotel, Torquay, in 2009. Cleese stayed at the hotel with the Monty Python team in 1970, and was inspired to write the series by the eccentric behaviour of the hotel's owner Donald Sinclair.

In May 1970, the Monty Python comedy group stayed at the now-demolished Gleneagles Hotel in Torquay, Devon, while filming on location in Paignton. John Cleese was fascinated with the behaviour of the owner, Donald Sinclair, later describing him as "the rudest man I've ever come across in my life". Among such behaviour by Sinclair was his criticism of Terry Gilliam's "too American" table etiquette and tossing Eric Idle's briefcase out of a window "in case it contained a bomb". Asked why anyone would want to bomb the hotel, Sinclair replied, "We've had a lot of staff problems." Michael Palin states that Sinclair "seemed to view us as a colossal inconvenience". Rosemary Harrison, a waitress at the Gleneagles under Sinclair, described him as "bonkers" and lacking in hospitality, deeming him wholly unsuitable for a hotel proprietor. "It was as if he didn't want the guests to be there." Cleese and his then-wife Connie Booth stayed on at the hotel after filming, furthering their research of its owner. Demolished in 2015, the building was replaced by a new retirement home named Sachs Lodge in memory of Andrew Sachs who played Manuel in the sitcom and who died in 2016.

Cleese was an occasional writer on the 1970s medical sitcom Doctor in the House and its follow-ons for London Weekend Television. An early prototype of the character that became known as Basil Fawlty was developed in an episode ("No Ill Feelings") of the third Doctor series (titled Doctor at Large). In this episode, the main character (played by Barry Evans) checks into a small-town hotel, his very presence seemingly winding up the aggressive and incompetent manager (played by Timothy Bateson) with a domineering wife. The show was broadcast on 30 May 1971.

Cleese said in 2008 that the first Fawlty Towers script he and Booth wrote was rejected by the BBC. At a 30th-anniversary event honouring the show, Cleese said,

Connie and I wrote that first episode and we sent it in to [BBC head of comedy] Jimmy Gilbert. The fellow whose job it was to assess the quality of the writing said (and I can quote [his note to me] fairly accurately), "This is full of clichéd situations and stereotypical characters and I cannot see it as being anything other than a disaster." Gilbert himself said that "You're going to have to get them out of the hotel, John. You can't do the whole thing in the hotel."

Cleese was paid £6,000 for 43 weeks of work and supplemented his income by appearing in television advertisements. He said "I have to thank the advertising industry for making this possible. Connie and I used to spend six weeks writing each episode and we didn't make a lot of money out of it. If it hadn't been for the commercials I wouldn't have been able to afford to spend so much time on the script."

== Production ==
Although the series is set in Torquay, no part of it was shot in South West England. For the exterior filming, the Wooburn Grange Country Club in Wooburn Green, Buckinghamshire, was used instead of a hotel. In several episodes of the series, the entrance gate at the bottom of the drive states the real name of the location. This listed building later served for a short time as a nightclub named "Basil's" after the series ended, before being destroyed by a fire in March 1991. The remnants of the building were demolished and a housing estate was built on the site. Few traces of the original site exist today. Other location filming was done mostly around Harrow.

Both Cleese and Booth were keen on every script being perfect, and some episodes took four months and required as many as 10 drafts until they were satisfied. Booth clarified in 2025 that Cleese was primarily responsible for the dialogue.

Cleese said that one of the reasons the series worked so well was the quality of the scripts and the care taken over the editing. He told a TV interviewer that while the average BBC half-hour comedy script had 65 pages, the ones for Fawlty Towers had between 135 and 140 pages. He said "We literally did twice as many camera cuts—average shows got 200, we used to have 400. So there was an enormous amount in there. The other thing is that they were very well constructed." Once an episode had been filmed, the editing process started. "We did anything between 20 and 25 hours editing each show. Almost every minute you see up on the screen, we spent one hour editing and it was only by doing that you could just tighten it up, just tighten it there and take out a line of dialogue, sometimes take out a repetition, they'll then lose two lines of dialogue there. That's what really got the pace on it."

The theme music was composed by Dennis Wilson. It was recorded by the Aeolian Quartet, who were asked by director John Howard Davies to perform the piece badly, although in the end they did not.

== Plot directions and examples ==
The series focuses on the exploits and misadventures of short-fused hotelier Basil Fawlty and his acerbic wife Sybil, as well as their employees: waiter Manuel, Polly Sherman, and, in the second series, chef Terry. The episodes typically revolve around Basil's efforts to "raise the tone" of his hotel and his increasing frustration at numerous complications and mistakes, both his own and those of others, which prevent him from doing so.

Much of the humour comes from Basil's overly aggressive manner, engaging in angry but witty arguments with guests, staff and, in particular, Sybil, whom he addresses (in a faux-romantic way) with insults such as "that golfing puff adder", "my little piranha fish" and "my little nest of vipers". Despite this, Basil frequently feels intimidated, Sybil being able to cow him at any time, usually with a short, sharp cry of "Basil!" At the end of some episodes, Basil succeeds in annoying (or at least bemusing) the guests and frequently gets his comeuppance.

The plots are intricate and farcical, involving coincidences, misunderstandings, cross-purposes and meetings both missed and accidental. The innuendo of the bedroom farce is sometimes present (often to the disgust of the socially conservative Basil) but it is his eccentricity, not his lust, that drives the plots. The events test to the breaking point what little patience Basil has, sometimes causing him to have a near breakdown by the end of the episode.

The guests at the hotel typically are comic foils to Basil's anger and outbursts. Guest characters in each episode provide different characteristics (working class, promiscuous, foreign) that he cannot stand. Requests both reasonable and impossible test his temper. Even the afflicted annoy him, for example in the episode "Communication Problems", revolving around the havoc caused by the frequent misunderstandings between the staff and the hard-of-hearing Mrs. Richards. Near the end, Basil pretends to faint just at the mention of her name. This episode is typical of the show's careful weaving of humorous situations through comedy cross-talk. The show also uses mild black humour at times, notably when Basil is forced to hide a dead body ("Two dead, twenty-five to go.") and in his comments about Sybil ("Did you ever see that film, How to Murder Your Wife? ... Awfully good. I saw it six times.") and to Mrs. Richards ("May I suggest that you consider moving to a hotel closer to the sea? Or preferably in it.")

Basil's physical outbursts are primarily directed at Manuel, an emotional but largely innocent Spaniard whose confused English vocabulary causes him to make elementary mistakes. At times, Basil beats Manuel with a frying pan and smacks his forehead with a spoon. The violence towards Manuel caused rare criticism of the show. Sybil and Polly, on the other hand, are more patient and understanding towards Manuel; everyone's usual excuse to guests for his behaviour is "He's from Barcelona"; Manuel even once used the excuse for himself.

Basil longs for a touch of class, sometimes playing recordings of classical music. In the first episode he is playing music by Brahms when Sybil remarks, after pestering him asking to do different tasks: "You could have them both done by now if you hadn't spent the whole morning skulking in there listening to that racket." Basil replies, with exasperation, "Racket? That's Brahms! Brahms' Third Racket!" Basil often displays blatant snobbishness as he attempts to climb the social ladder, frequently expressing disdain for the "riff-raff", "cretins" and "yobbos" that he believes regularly populate his hotel. His desperation is readily apparent as he makes increasingly hopeless manoeuvres and painful faux pas in trying to curry favour with those he perceives as having superior social status. Yet he finds himself forced to serve those individuals that are "beneath" him. Basil's efforts tend to be counter-productive, with guests leaving the hotel in disgust and his marriage (and sanity) stretching to breaking point.

== Characters ==
=== Basil Fawlty ===
Cast of Fawlty Towers, left to right: (front) Prunella Scales (Sybil Fawlty), Connie Booth (Polly) and Andrew Sachs (Manuel); (back) John Cleese (Basil Fawlty)

Basil Fawlty, played by John Cleese, is a cynical and snobbish misanthrope who is desperate to belong to a higher social class. He sees a successful hotel as a means of achieving this, yet his job forces him to be polite to people he despises.

He is intimidated by his wife Sybil Fawlty. He yearns to stand up to her, but his plans frequently conflict with her demands. She is often verbally abusive (describing him as "an ageing, brilliantined stick insect") but although he towers over her, he often finds himself on the receiving end of her temper, verbally and physically (as in "The Builders"), and it is only on one occasion when Sybil mistakenly believes he is stalking an attractive Australian guest that he finally snaps and stands up to her.

Basil usually turns to Manuel or Polly to help him with his schemes, while trying his best to keep Sybil from discovering them. However, Basil occasionally laments the time when there was passion in their relationship, now seemingly lost. Also, it appears he still does care for her and remains loyal to her, and actively resists the flirtations of a French guest in one episode. The penultimate episode, "The Anniversary", is about his efforts to put together a surprise anniversary party involving their closest friends. Things go wrong as Basil pretends the anniversary date does not remind him of anything though he pretends to have a stab at it by reeling off a list of random anniversaries, starting with the Battle of Agincourt, for which he receives a slap from Sybil, who becomes increasingly frustrated and angry. He continues guessing even after Sybil is out of earshot, and mentions other anniversaries (none of which happened on 17 April), including the Battle of Trafalgar and Yom Kippur, just to enhance the surprise. Sybil believes he really has forgotten, and leaves in a huff. In an interview in the DVD box set, Cleese claims this episode deliberately takes a slightly different tone from the others, fleshing out their otherwise inexplicable status as a couple.

In keeping with the lack of explanation about the marriage, not much is revealed of the characters' back-stories. It is known that Basil served in the British Army and saw action in the Korean War, possibly as part of his National Service. (Note: John Cleese himself was only 13 when the Korean War ended, making the character of Basil at least five or six years older than him.) Basil exaggerates this period of his life, proclaiming to strangers, "I killed four men." To this Sybil jokes that "He was in the Catering Corps—he used to poison them." Basil is often seen wearing regimental and old-boy style ties, perhaps spuriously, one of which is in the colours of the Army Catering Corps. He also claims to have sustained a shrapnel injury to his leg; it tends to flare up at suspiciously convenient times. The only person towards whom Basil generally exhibits tolerance and good manners is the old and senile Major Gowen, a permanent resident at the hotel who is a veteran of one of the world wars (which one is never specified, though he once mentions to Mrs Peignoir that he was in France in 1918). When interacting with Manuel, Basil displays a rudimentary knowledge of Spanish (Basil states that he "learned classical Spanish, not the strange dialect he [Manuel] seems to have picked up"); this knowledge is also ridiculed, as in the first episode in which a guest, whom Basil has immediately dismissed as working-class, communicates fluently with Manuel in Spanish after Basil is unable to do so.

Cleese described Basil as thinking that "he could run a first-rate hotel if he didn't have all the guests getting in the way" and as being "an absolutely awful human being" but says that in comedy if an awful person makes people laugh they unaccountably feel affectionate towards him. Indeed, he is not entirely unsympathetic. The "Hotel Inspectors" and "Communication Problems" episodes feature guests who are shown to be deeply annoying, with constant and unreasonable demands. In "Gourmet Night" the chef gets drunk and is unable to cook dinner, leaving Basil to scramble in an attempt to salvage the evening. Much of the time, Basil is an unfortunate victim of circumstances.

=== Sybil Fawlty ===
Sybil Fawlty, played by Prunella Scales, is Basil's wife. Energetic and petite, she prefers a working wardrobe of tight skirt-suits in shiny fabrics and sports a tower of permed hair augmented with hairpieces and wigs necessitating the use of overnight curlers. She often is a more effective manager of the hotel, making sure Basil gets certain jobs done or stays out of the way when she is handling difficult guests. Typically when Basil is on the verge of a meltdown due to a crisis (usually of his own making), it is Sybil who steps in to clear up the mess and bring some sense to the situation. Despite this, she rarely participates directly in the running of the hotel. During busy check-in sessions or meal times, while everyone else is busy working, Sybil is frequently talking on the phone to one of her friends with her phrase "Oohhh, I knoooooooow" or chatting to customers. She has a distinctive conversational tone and braying laugh, which Basil compares to "someone machine-gunning a seal". Being his wife, she is the only regular character who refers to Basil by his first name. When she barks his name at him, he flinchingly freezes in his tracks.

Basil refers to her by a number of epithets, occasionally to her face, including "that golfing puff-adder", "the dragon", "toxic midget", "the sabre-toothed tart", "my little kommandant", "my little piranha fish", "my little nest of vipers" and "you rancorous, coiffured old sow". Despite these nasty nicknames, Basil is terrified of her. The 1979 episode "The Psychiatrist" contains the only time he loses patience and snaps at her (Basil: "Shut up, I'm fed up." Sybil: "Oh, you've done it now.").

Prunella Scales speculated in an interview for The Complete Fawlty Towers DVD box set that Sybil married Basil because his origins were of a higher social class than hers.

=== Polly Sherman ===
Polly Sherman, played by Connie Booth, is a waitress and general assistant at the hotel with artistic aspirations. She is the most competent of the staff and the voice of sanity during chaotic moments, but is frequently embroiled in ridiculous masquerades as she loyally attempts to aid Basil in trying to cover up a mistake or keep something from Sybil.

In "The Anniversary" she snaps and refuses to help Basil out when he wants her to impersonate Sybil in the semi-darkness of her bedroom in front of the Fawltys' friends, Basil having dug himself into a hole by claiming Sybil was ill instead of admitting she had stormed out earlier in annoyance with him. Polly finally agrees, but only on condition that Basil lends her money to purchase a car, which he has previously refused to do.

Polly generally is good-natured but sometimes shows her frustration, and has odd moments of malice. In "The Kipper and the Corpse", the pampered Shih Tzu dog of an elderly guest bites Polly and Manuel. As revenge, Polly laces the dog's sausages with black pepper and Tabasco sauce ("bangers à la bang"), making it ill and eventually killing it.

Despite her part-time employment (during meal times), Polly frequently is saddled with many other duties, including as manager in "The Germans" when Sybil and Basil are incapacitated. In the first series, Polly is said to be an art student who, according to Basil, has spent three years at college. In "Gourmet Night", she is seen drawing a sketch (presumably of Manuel), which everyone but Basil immediately recognises and she sells it to the chef for 50p. Polly is not referred to as a student in the second series, although in both series she is shown to have a flair for languages, displaying ability in both Spanish and German. In "The Germans", Basil alludes to Polly's polyglot inclination by saying that she does her work "while learning two Oriental languages". Like Manuel, she has a room of her own at the hotel.

=== Manuel ===
Manuel, a waiter played by Andrew Sachs, is a well-meaning but disorganised and confused Spaniard from Barcelona with a poor grasp of the English language and customs. He is verbally and physically abused by his boss. When told what to do, he often responds, "¿Qué?" ("What?"). Manuel's character is used to demonstrate Basil's instinctive lack of sensitivity and tolerance. Every episode involves Basil becoming enraged at Manuel's confusion at his boss's bizarre demands and even basic requests. Manuel is afraid of Fawlty's quick temper and violent assaults, yet often expresses his appreciation for being given employment. He is relentlessly enthusiastic and is proud of what little English he knows.

During the series, Sachs was seriously injured twice. Cleese describes using a real metal pan to knock Manuel unconscious in "The Wedding Party", although he would have preferred to use a rubber one. The original producer and director, John Howard Davies, said that he made Basil use a metal one and that he was responsible for most of the violence on the show, which he felt was essential to the type of comical farce they were creating. Later, when Sachs's clothes were treated to give off smoke after he escaped the burning kitchen in "The Germans", the corrosive chemicals ate through them and gave Sachs severe burns.

Manuel's exaggerated Spanish accent is part of the humour of the show. In fact, Sachs's original language was German; he emigrated to Britain as a child.

The character's nationality was switched to Italian (and the name to Paolo) for the Spanish dub of the show, while in Catalonia and France, Manuel is a Mexican.

=== Other regular characters and themes ===
- Terry Hughes, played by Brian Hall, is the hotel chef throughout the second series. A sly, somewhat shifty Cockney, he is nonetheless a competent chef ("I 'ave been to catering school!"). His cooking methods are occasionally somewhat casual, which frustrates and worries the neurotic Basil; and he also has limited concern for food and kitchen hygiene, claiming that "What the eye don't see, the chef gets away with" and that "the better the kitchen, the filthier it is." He used to work in Dorchester (not at The Dorchester, as a guest wrongly infers). In "The Anniversary" Terry and Manuel come to blows since Terry doesn't like anyone overshadowing him as a cook, so he proceeds to sabotage the paella Manuel is making for Basil and Sybil, leading to fisticuffs at the end of the episode. Cleese himself told Hall to portray Terry as if he were on the run from the police.
- Major Gowen, played by Ballard Berkeley, is a slightly senile, amiable old soldier who is a permanent resident of the hotel. He is one of the few guests whom Basil seems to like. This is because he has the establishment status that Basil craves. He usually wears the Royal Artillery jagged-striped tie, and in "The Wedding Party" mentions to Mrs Peignoir being in France in 1918. He often is introduced as their "oldest resident" and in the episode "Waldorf Salad" Basil reveals that the Major has lived there for seven years. He enjoys talking about the world outside, especially the cricket scores and workers' strikes (the frequent strikes at British Leyland during the time of the series' original transmission were often mentioned), and is always on the lookout for the newspaper. In the episode "The Germans" he shows he has trouble forgiving the Germans because of the wars. The best he can say is that German women make good card players. In the same episode, he also demonstrates his outdated racial attitudes when he comments about the ethnic difference between "wogs" and "niggers". Despite his good intentions, the Major can cause Basil's plans to go awry, notably in the episode "Communication Problems" in which Basil tries his best to keep secret from Sybil the money he won in a bet.
- Miss Tibbs and Miss Gatsby, played by Gilly Flower and Renee Roberts, are the other two permanent residents. Seemingly inseparable, these sweet-natured, dotty spinsters appear to have taken a fancy to Basil, feeling that they need to take care of him. In response, Basil vacillates between superficial charm and blunt rudeness during his conversations with them.
- Audrey is Sybil's lifelong best friend, and is mostly acknowledged during gossipy telephone calls. Talking with her is a refuge for Sybil. When times get tough for Audrey, who has a dysfunctional relationship with her husband George, Sybil will offer solutions and guidance, often resulting in the catchphrase "Ohhh, I knowwww..." when she tries to commiserate with Audrey's problems. In Audrey's one on-screen appearance, in "The Anniversary", she is played by actress Christine Shaw. Basil tells Major Gowen that he thinks she is a "dreadful woman".
- A running gag throughout the two series is the rearranged letters of the "Fawlty Towers" hotel sign which is shown at the beginning of every episode except "The Germans", when a hospital exterior is used as an establishing shot. In series one, the letters slowly fall from the sign due to lack of maintenance. In series two, the letters are re-arranged into a series of deliberate anagrams. The paperboy, though rarely seen, is revealed at the beginning of "The Psychiatrist" to be the prankster who rearranges the letters on the sign to sometimes crude phrases. The sign's phrases were provided by production assistant Iain McLean, who was a keen crossword solver.
- Terence Conoley appears in two episodes as entirely different characters. In "A Touch of Class" he plays Mr Wareing, and in "Waldorf Salad" he portrays Mr Johnston.

== Episodes ==
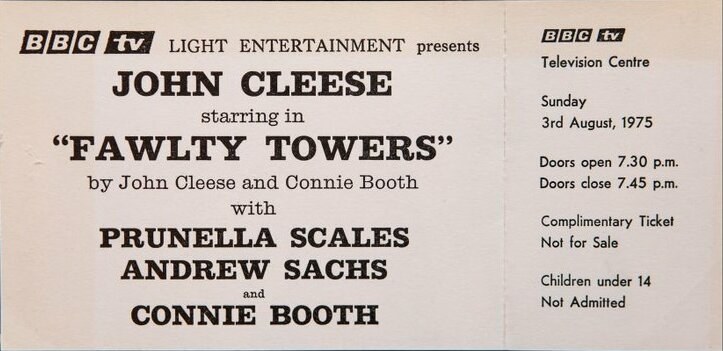
BBC studio recording ticket for the second episode, "The Builders"

The first episode of Fawlty Towers was recorded as a pilot on 24 December 1974; the rest of the series was recorded in 1975. It was then originally broadcast on 19 September. The 12th and final episode was first shown on 25 October 1979. The first series was directed by John Howard Davies, the second by Bob Spiers. Both had their premieres on BBC Two.

When originally transmitted, the individual episodes had no on-screen titles. The ones in common currency were first used for the VHS release of the series in the 1980s. There were working titles, such as "USA" for "Waldorf Salad", "Death" for "The Kipper and the Corpse" and "Rat" for "Basil the Rat", which have been printed in some programme guides. In addition, some of the early BBC audio releases of episodes on vinyl and cassette included other variations, such as "Mrs Richards" and "The Rat" for "Communication Problems" and "Basil the Rat" respectively.

In 2022, a "lost" scene cut from the episode "The Anniversary" (that went unfilmed) was uncovered as part of a script copy, featuring Basil climbing out his bedroom window to avoid sex with a drunken Sybil, who had wanted to make up.

It has long been rumoured that a 13th episode of the series was written and filmed, but never progressed further than a rough cut. Lars Holger Holm, author of the book Fawlty Towers: A Worshipper's Companion, has made detailed claims about the episode's content, but he provides no concrete evidence of its existence.

On the subject of whether more episodes would be produced, Cleese said (in an interview for the complete DVD box set, which was republished in the book Fawlty Towers Fully Booked) that he once had the genesis of a feature-length special—possibly sometime during the mid-1990s. The plot, never fleshed out beyond his initial idea, would have revolved around the chaos that a now-retired Basil typically caused as he and Sybil flew to Barcelona to visit their former employee Manuel and his family. Of the idea, Cleese said:

We had an idea for a plot which I loved. Basil was finally invited to Spain to meet Manuel's family. He gets to Heathrow and then spends about 14 frustrating hours waiting for the flight. Finally, on the plane, a terrorist pulls a gun and tries to hijack the thing. Basil is so angry he overcomes the terrorist, and when the pilot says, "We have to fly back to Heathrow" Basil says, "No, fly us to Spain or I'll shoot you." He arrives in Spain, is immediately arrested, and spends the entire holiday in a Spanish jail. He is released just in time to go back on the plane with Sybil. It was very funny, but I couldn't do it at the time. Making "Fawlty Towers" work at 90 minutes was a very difficult proposition. You can build up the comedy for 30 minutes, but at that length there has to be a trough and another peak. It doesn't interest me. I don't want to do it.

Cleese also may have been reluctant because of Connie Booth's unwillingness to be involved. She had practically retreated from public life after the show finished (and had been initially unwilling to collaborate on a second series, which explains the four-year gap between productions).

The decision by Cleese and Booth to quit before a third series has often been lauded as it ensured the show's successful status would not be weakened with later, lower-quality work. Subsequently, it has inspired the makers of other shows to do likewise. Ricky Gervais and Stephen Merchant refused to make a third series of either The Office or Extras, citing Fawlty Towers' short lifespan. Rik Mayall, Ben Elton and Lise Mayer, the writers behind The Young Ones, which also ran for only two series (each with six episodes), used this explanation as well. Victoria Wood also indicated this influenced her decision to limit dinnerladies to 16 episodes over two series.

The origins, background and eventual cancellation of the series were later humorously referenced in 1987's The Secret Policeman's Ball in a sketch in which Hugh Laurie and Stephen Fry present Cleese—whom they comically misname "Jim Cleese"—with a Dick Emery Lifetime Achievement Award ("Silver Dick") for his contributions to comedy, then launch into a comical series of questions regarding the show, including Cleese's marriage and divorce from Booth, innocently ridiculing Cleese and reducing him to tears, to a point at which he gets on his knees and crawls off the stage while crying.

=== Series overview ===
Series	Episodes	Originally released		
Series	Episodes	First released	Last released	Network
1	6	19 September 1975	24 October 1975	BBC Two
2	6	19 February 1979	25 October 1979	BBC Two

=== Series 1 (1975) ===
No.	Title	Sign reads	Original release date
1	"A Touch of Class"	FAWLTY TOWERS (Crooked S)	19 September 1975
As Basil tries to raise the tone of the hotel, the aristocratic Lord Melbury comes to stay at the hotel. Basil fawns over him at every opportunity, causing himself to neglect or annoy other guests, until Polly discovers Melbury is actually a confidence trickster. Meanwhile, Sybil orders Basil to hang a picture. Featuring: Michael Gwynn as Lord Melbury, Robin Ellis as Danny Brown, Martin Wyldeck as Sir Richard Morris, David Simeon as Mr Mackenzie, Terence Conoley as Mr Wareing and Lionel Wheeler as Mr Watson.
2	"The Builders"	FAWLTY TOWER (Crooked L and missing S)	26 September 1975
Major renovations are made to the lobby while the Fawltys are out, but when a misreading causes the incompetent builders to mess it up spectacularly, Basil must try to remedy the situation before Sybil finds out. Featuring: David Kelly as O'Reilly, James Appleby as Stubbs, George Lee as Delivery Man, Michael Cronin as Lurphy, Michael Halsey as Jones and Barney Dorman as Kerr.
3	"The Wedding Party"	FAW TY TOWER (Crooked W, missing L and missing S)	3 October 1975
Basil gets annoyed when a young, flirtatious couple start "hanky-pankying" under his nose and tries to avoid the advances of a female French antique dealer. Meanwhile, misfortune conspires to put him in compromising situations whenever the couple are around. Featuring: Yvonne Gilan as Mrs Peignoir, Conrad Phillips as Mr Lloyd, Diana King as Mrs Lloyd, Trevor Adams as Alan, April Walker as Jean and Jay Neill as Bar Guest.
4	"The Hotel Inspectors"	FAW TY TO ER (Missing L, missing W and missing S)	10 October 1975
When Basil hears of hotel inspectors roaming Torquay incognito, he realises with horror that guests he has been abusing could easily be among them. Basil becomes increasingly obsessed with trying to determine which guests are hotel inspectors, and gets frustrated when his suspects turn out not to be. But then, without warning, the real inspectors show up. Featuring: Bernard Cribbins as Mr Hutchinson, James Cossins as Mr Walt, Geoffrey Morris as John (inspector) and Peter Brett as Brian (inspector).
5	"Gourmet Night"	WARTY TOWELS	17 October 1975
Basil holds a gourmet night to attract posher guests and climb Torquay's social ladder. Unfortunately, thanks to the chef's alcoholism, Basil must try to get hold of a duck from his friend, André. This, combined with his social awkwardness and car problems, leads Basil ever closer to a nervous breakdown. Featuring: André Maranne as André, Steve Plytas as Kurt, Allan Cuthbertson as Colonel Hall, Ann Way as Mrs Hall, Richard Caldicot as Mr Twitchen, Betty Huntley-Wright as Mrs Twitchen, Jeffrey Segal as Mr Heath, Elizabeth Benson as Mrs Heath and Tony Page as Master Heath.
6	"The Germans"	None (Note: This is the only episode of the twelve that does not feature the hotel as the backdrop for the titles. Footage of the Northwick Park Hospital in Brent was used instead, hence the sign is not shown.)	24 October 1975
With Sybil in the hospital with an ingrown toenail, a moose's head to hang up and some German guests arriving the next day, Basil has his work cut out for him. After an attempted fire drill goes wrong and Basil lands up in the hospital with concussion, he succeeds in causing much offence to the German guests after finally escaping back to the hotel. This episode is the origin of the quotation "Don't mention the war." Featuring: Claire Davenport as Mrs Wilson, Brenda Cowling as Sister, Louis Mahoney as Doctor, John Lawrence as Mr Sharp, Iris Fry as Mrs Sharp, Willy Bowman, Nick Kane, Lisa Bergmayr and Dan Gillan as German Guests.

=== Series 2 (1979) ===
The second series was transmitted three-and-a-half years later, with the first episode being broadcast on 19 February 1979. Due to an industrial dispute at the BBC, which resulted in a strike, the final episode was not completed until well after the others, being finally shown as a one-off instalment on 25 October 1979. The cancelled episode on 19 March was replaced with a repeat of "Gourmet Night" from series 1. In the second series the anagrams were created by Ian McClane, the assistant floor manager. However, the only one which is actually a true anagram for the hotel's name is "Flowery Twats", created for "The Anniversary".

No.	Title	Sign reads	Original release date
7	"Communication Problems"	FAWLTY TOWER (Crooked L and missing S) (Note: This is the same opening shot as in episode 2, "The Builders", from Series 1.)	19 February 1979
The arrival of the "guest from hell"—Mrs Richards, a rather deaf, domineering and bad-tempered woman—interferes with Basil's attempts to prevent the money he won on a racehorse from being discovered by Sybil, who disapproves of gambling. Featuring: Joan Sanderson as Mrs Richards, Robert Lankesheer as Mr Thurston, Johnny Shannon as Mr Firkins, Bill Bradley as Mr Mackintosh, George Lee as Mr Kerr and Mervyn Pascoe as Mr Yardley.
8	"The Psychiatrist"	WATERY FOWLS	26 February 1979
A psychiatrist and his wife—also a doctor—come to the hotel for a weekend break, and notice all of Basil's odd behaviour. Initially enthused by his guests' class and professions, Basil is later perturbed when he discovers the doctor's speciality is psychiatry. Another guest, Mr Johnson, is secretly sharing his room with a woman and Basil becomes obsessed with catching him out, which leads to several incidents with a buxom Australian female guest, which gets him in trouble with Sybil. Featuring: Nicky Henson as Mr Johnson, Basil Henson as Dr Abbott, Elspet Gray as Mrs Abbott, Luan Peters as Raylene Miles, Aimée Delamain as Mrs Johnson and Imogen Bickford-Smith as Girlfriend.
9	"Waldorf Salad"	FLAY OTTERS	5 March 1979
Basil is not altogether keen on a loud and demanding American guest who demands a higher class of service—and food—than Fawlty Towers is accustomed to providing. Basil soon learns that the American guest will not tolerate any shenanigans. Featuring: Bruce Boa as Mr Hamilton, Claire Nielson as Mrs Hamilton, Norman Bird as Mr Arrad, Stella Tanner as Mrs Arrad, Terence Conoley as Mr Johnston, June Ellis as Mrs Johnston, Anthony Dawes as Mr Libson, Beatrice Shaw as Miss Gurke and Dorothy Frere as Miss Hare.
10	"The Kipper and the Corpse"	FATTY OWLS	12 March 1979
With no regard to Basil's blood pressure, a guest dies at the hotel, and Basil and the staff are left with the unpleasant task of removing the body discreetly while the doctor staying at the hotel, Dr. Price, waits for his sausages. Elsewhere, Polly and Manuel feed an elderly woman's pampered pet dog some extra spicy sausages after it bites them both. Featuring: Geoffrey Palmer as Dr Price, Mavis Pugh as Mrs Chase, Richard Davies as Mr White, Elizabeth Benson as Mrs White, Derek Royle as Mr Leeman, Robert McBain as Mr Xerxes, Pamela Buchner as Miss Young, Raymond Mason as Mr Zebedee, Charles McKeown as Mr Ingrams and Len Marten as Guest.
11	"The Anniversary"	FLOWERY TWATS	26 March 1979
Basil invites some friends for a surprise wedding anniversary party, but Sybil assumes he has forgotten their anniversary and storms off, leaving her husband and Polly, in disguise, desperately telling the others she is 'ill'. Featuring: Ken Campbell as Roger, Una Stubbs as Alice, Robert Arnold as Arthur, Pat Keen as Virginia, Roger Hume as Reg, Denyse Alexander as Kitty and Christine Shaw as Audrey.
12	"Basil the Rat"	FARTY TOWELS	25 October 1979
The local health inspector notes and reads out a long list of hygiene infractions which the staff must rectify before his next visit, or else face closure. After Manuel's pet rat escapes from his cage and runs loose in the hotel, the staff must catch it before the inspector sees it. At the same time, they must discern which veal cutlets are safe to eat after one covered in rat poison gets mixed up with the others. Featuring: John Quarmby as Mr Carnegie, David Neville as Ronald, Sabina Franklyn as Quentina, James Taylor as Mr Taylor, Melody Lang as Mrs Taylor and Stuart Sherwin as Guest.

== Reception ==
=== Critical reaction ===
==== Contemporary ====
At first, the series was not universally held in high esteem. The Daily Mirror's review of the show in 1975 had the headline "Long John Short On Jokes". One critic of the show was Richard Ingrams, then television reviewer for The Spectator, who wrote a caustic piece condemning the programme. Cleese got his revenge by naming one of the guests in the second series "Mr Ingrams", who is caught in his room with a blow-up doll. However, many contemporary critics were effusive in their praise for the series. The Sunday Times called it "the funniest sitcom in years". Clive James writing in The Observer said the second episode had him "retching with laughter." Peter Fiddick also championed Fawlty Towers in The Guardian, calling it "the undoubted hit even of a season with a lot of comedy on show" and "one of the most amazingly funny programmes to come out of any television". When the first series ended, the Daily Mail made the final episode its pick of the day, with Tim Ewbank writing, "Sadly, the hilarious series FAWLTY TOWERS...ends tonight and the hope must be that it gets a repeat showing to the wider BBC 1 audience."

==== Retrospective ====
On Rotten Tomatoes, Fawlty Towers has an aggregate score of 100% based on 14 critic reviews. The website's consensus reads: "Fawlty Towers looms large over British comedy with John Cleese's impeccably hapless performance and an endless array of exuberant slapstick—making for a supremely stimulating chuckler."

In an interview for the "TV Characters" edition of Channel 4's "talking heads" strand 100 Greatest (in which Basil placed second, between Homer Simpson and Edmund Blackadder), TV critic A. A. Gill theorised that the initially muted response may have been caused by Cleese seemingly ditching his label as a comic revolutionary—earned through his years with Monty Python—to do something more traditional.

In a list of the 100 Greatest British Television Programmes drawn up by the British Film Institute in 2000, voted for by industry professionals, Fawlty Towers was placed first. It was also voted fifth in the "Britain's Best Sitcom" poll in 2004, and second only to Frasier in The Ultimate Sitcom poll of comedy writers in January 2006. Basil Fawlty came top of the Britain's Funniest Comedy Character poll, held by Five on 14 May 2006. In 1997, "The Germans" was ranked No. 12 on TV Guide's 100 Greatest Episodes of All Time. Empire magazine's 2024 list of the 100 greatest TV shows of all time ranks it at No. 22.

=== Awards and accolades ===
Three British Academy Television Awards (BAFTAs) were awarded to people for their involvement with the series. Both of the series were awarded the BAFTA in the category Best Scripted Comedy, the first being won by John Howard Davies in 1976, and the second by Douglas Argent and Bob Spiers in 1980. In 1980, Cleese received the BAFTA for Best Entertainment Performance.

In a list drawn up by the British Film Institute in 2000, voted by industry professionals, Fawlty Towers was named the best British television series of all time.

=== Legacy ===
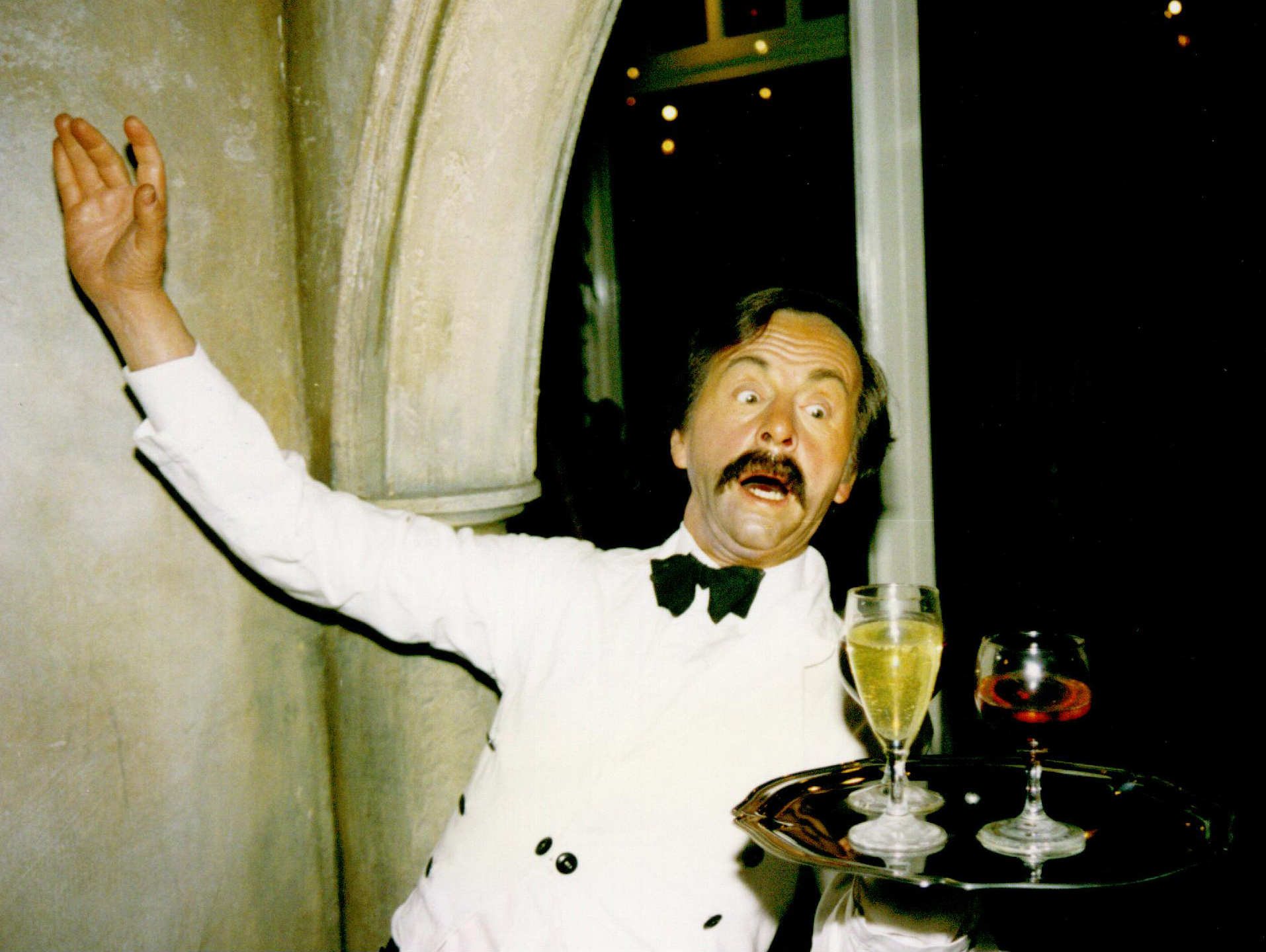
Waxwork of hapless waiter Manuel at Madame Tussauds, London

Naming Fawlty Towers among the shows he loved growing up, comedy writer Graham Linehan cited the "farce elements" of the show as an influence for his much acclaimed sitcom Father Ted.

In 2025, John Cleese published a book about the series titled Fawlty Towers: Fawlts & All, marking the show's 50th anniversary.

== Remakes, adaptations and reunions ==
Three attempted remakes of Fawlty Towers were started for the American market, with two making it into production. The first, Chateau Snavely, starring Harvey Korman and Betty White, was produced by ABC for a pilot in 1978, but the series was never produced. The second, also by ABC, was Amanda's, starring Bea Arthur, notable for switching the sexes of its Basil and Sybil equivalents. It also failed to attract a major audience and was dropped after ten episodes had been aired, despite 13 completed episodes. A third remake, called Payne (produced by and starring John Larroquette), aired in 1999, but was cancelled shortly afterwards. Nine episodes were produced, of which eight aired on American television (though the complete run was broadcast overseas). A German pilot was made in 2001, named Zum letzten Kliff (To the last cliff), but no further episodes were made after its first series.

American sitcoms 3rd Rock from the Sun and Cheers (in both of which Cleese made guest appearances) have cited Fawlty Towers as an inspiration, especially regarding its depiction of a dysfunctional workplace "family". Arthur Mathews and Graham Linehan have cited Fawlty Towers as a major influence on their sitcom Father Ted. Guest House on Pakistan's PTV also resembled the series.

Several of the characters have made other appearances, as spin-offs or in small cameo roles. In 1981, in character as Manuel, Sachs recorded his own version of the Joe Dolce cod-Italian song "Shaddap You Face" (with the B-side "Waiter, There's a Flea in My Soup") but the record's release was delayed because Dolce took out an injunction: he was about to issue his version in Britain. When Sachs's version was eventually released later in 1981, it did not chart. Sachs also portrayed a Manuel-like character in a series of British TV advertisements for life insurance. In 2006, Cleese played Basil for the first time in 27 years, for an unofficial England 2006 World Cup song, "Don't Mention the World Cup", taking its name from the phrase, "Don't mention the war", which Basil used in the episode "The Germans". In 2007, Cleese and Sachs reprised their roles for a six-episode corporate business video for the Norwegian oil company Statoil. In the video, Fawlty is running a restaurant called "Basil's Brasserie" while Manuel owns a Michelin-starred restaurant in London.

In November 2007, Scales returned to play Sybil in a series of sketches for the BBC's annual Children in Need charity telethon. The character was seen taking over the management of the eponymous hotel from the BBC drama series Hotel Babylon, interacting with characters from that programme as well as other 1970s sitcom characters. The character of Sybil was used with Cleese's permission. In 2007, the Los Angeles Film School produced seven episodes of Fawlty Tower Oxnard, starring Robert Romanus as Basil.

In 2009, Tiger Aspect Productions produced a two-part documentary for the digital comedy channel Gold, called Fawlty Towers: Re-Opened. The documentary features interviews with all four main cast members, including Connie Booth, who had refused to talk about the series for 30 years. John Cleese said at the 30-year reunion in May 2009 that they would never make another episode of the comedy because they are "too old and tired" and expectations would be too high. In a television interview (shown in Australia on Seven Network and the Australian Broadcasting Corporation) on 7 May 2009, Cleese also commented that he and Booth took six weeks to write each episode.

In 2016, Cleese reprised his role as Basil in a series of TV adverts for High Street optician chain Specsavers. The same year, Cleese and Booth reunited to create and co-write the official theatrical adaptation of Fawlty Towers, which premiered in Melbourne at the Comedy Theatre. It was critically well received, subsequently embarking on a tour of Australia. Cleese was intimately involved in the creation of the stage version from the beginning, including casting. He visited Australia to promote and oversee the production. Melbourne was chosen to premiere the adaptation due to the series' enduring popularity in Australia, and also as it had become a popular international test market for large-scale theatrical productions in recent years, having recently been the city where the revised Love Never Dies and the new King Kong also premiered. Cleese also noted he did not believe the London press would give the adaptation fair, unbiased reviews, so he deliberately chose to premiere it elsewhere. On 2 February 2024, it was announced that the 2016 stage show based on Fawlty Towers would launch at London's Apollo Theatre later that year.

Prior to the launch of the official Fawlty Towers theatrical adaptation in 2016, Cleese contested the legal validity of the Australian touring stage production, Faulty Towers The Dining Experience, and threatened to sue its creators; this subsequently led to the cancellation of the tribute show's US tour.

In 2023 Cleese announced he was planning a sequel series, along with his daughter Camilla. The show was initially being developed at Castle Rock Entertainment, with Rob Reiner as executive producer. The premise involved Basil (Cleese) trying to operate Fawlty Towers with help from his long-lost daughter (Camilla) and adjusting to the modern world, and was going to be set in the Caribbean. Cleese ruled out the BBC as broadcaster for the sequel due to it "limiting his creative freedom".

== Overseas ==
In 1977 and 1978 alone, the original TV show was sold to 45 stations in 17 countries, and was the BBC's best-selling overseas programme for that year. Fawlty Towers became a huge success in almost all countries in which it aired. Although it was initially a flop in Spain, largely because of the portrayal of the Spanish waiter Manuel, it was successfully resold with the Manuel character's nationality changed to Italian, except in Spain's Catalan region, in which Manuel was Mexican. To show how badly it translated, Clive James picked up a clip containing Manuel's "¿Qué?" phrase to show on Clive James on Television in 1982. The series was also briefly broadcast in Italy in the 1990s on the satellite channel Canal Jimmy, in the original English with Italian subtitles.

In Australia, the show originally was broadcast on ABC Television, the first series in 1976 and the second series in 1980. The show then was sold to the Seven Network, where it has been repeated numerous times.

== Home media and merchandise ==
=== Audio releases ===
Four albums were released by BBC Records on vinyl LP and cassette. These consisted of the original television soundtracks, and from the second album onwards had additional voice-over from Sachs (in character as Manuel) describing scenes which relied on visual humour.

The first album, simply titled Fawlty Towers, was released in 1979 and contained audio from "Communication Problems" (as "Mrs Richards") and "Hotel Inspectors". The second album, Second Sitting, was released in 1981 and contained audio from "Basil the Rat" (as "The Rat") and "The Builders". Both of these first two albums reached the Top 30 of the UK Albums Chart.

At Your Service was released in 1982, and contained audio from "The Kipper and the Corpse" (as "Death") and "The Germans" (as "Fire Drill"). Finally, A La Carte was released in 1983, and contained audio from "Waldorf Salad" (as "The Americans") and "Gourmet Night".

The albums were re-released as double-cassette packs under the titles Fawlty Towers 1 and Fawlty Towers 2 in 1988. The remaining four episodes did not get an audio-only release until 1994 on audio cassette as Fawlty Towers 3.

The first CD release of the audio versions was in a box set in 2003, titled Fawlty Towers – The Collector's Edition, which included spoken introductions to each episode by Cleese, and an interview with Scales and Sachs.

The four vinyl records were reissued in a limited-edition box set, along with the remaining four episodes on vinyl for the first time, for Record Store Day in 2021.

=== Home media ===
Fawlty Towers was originally released by BBC Video in 1984, with three episodes on each of four tapes. Each was edited with the credits from all three episodes put at the end of the tape. A LaserDisc containing all episodes spliced together as a continuous episode was released in the US on 23 June 1993. It was re-released in 1994, unedited but digitally remastered. It also was re-released in 1997 with a special interview with Cleese. Fawlty Towers – The Complete Series was released on DVD on 16 October 2001, available in regions 1, 2 and 4. A "Collector's Edition" is available in region 2.

The original DVD contained a slightly edited version of "The Kipper and the Corpse", in which Basil's line "Is it your legs?" (said to Mr Leeman when asking why he wants breakfast in bed) is missing. This line was restored in subsequent remasters.

Series one was released on UMD Video for PSP. In July 2009, BBC America announced a DVD reissue, released on 20 October 2009. Titled Fawlty Towers Remastered: Special Edition, contains commentary by Cleese on every episode as well as remastered video and audio. All episodes have been made available for digital purchase on platforms such as Amazon Prime Video and iTunes in the UK. In 2021, all episodes were made available on the BBC iPlayer.

In 2020, John Cleese criticised the BBC when the episode "The Germans" was removed from the streaming platform belonging to UKTV due to "offensive language" used by the character of the Major; the channel, a BBC subsidiary, said at the time that it planned to reinstate the episodes with content advisory messages. The BBC has also aired cut versions of the episode on broadcast television during reruns in some instances in 2013 and 2021, in part citing UK airtime watershed regulations.

=== Computer game ===
A Fawlty Towers game was released on PC in 2000 and featured a number of interactive games, desktop-customising content, and clips from the show.

=== Books ===
The original scripts were released in a hardback book by Methuen, The Complete Fawlty Towers, in 1988.

On 18 October 2007, Fawlty Towers The Story of the Sitcom was released, written by television historian and author Graham McCann and published by Hodder & Stoughton.

On 9 October 2025, Fawlty Towers: Fawlts and All: My Favourite Moments, authored by John Cleese, was released to mark the show's 50th anniversary, published by Headline Publishing Group.
