= Louis Mahoney =

Gambian-born British actor (1938–2020)

- Born: Louis Felix Danner Mahoney; 8 September 1938; Bathurst, British Gambia
- Died: 28 June 2020 (aged 81); London, England
- Education: Central School of Speech and Drama
- Occupation: Actor
- Years active: 1962–2020

Louis Felix Danner Mahoney (/ˈluːiːməˈhoʊni/; 8 September 1938 – 28 June 2020) was a Gambian-born British actor, based in Hampstead in London. He was an anti-racist activist and long-time campaigner for racial equality within the acting profession. He represented African-Asian members on the council of the actors' union, Equity, and served as joint Vice-President between 1994 and 1996.

== Early life ==
Mahoney was born in Bathurst (now Banjul), the Gambia, in 1938, the eldest of six children to James Mahoney and Princess (née Danner). Mahoney attended the Methodist Boys' High School. In 1957, he moved to England to study medicine at University College London. He also joined the university's cricket team and played for Essex and Ilford. However, he left to pursue drama at the (now Royal) Central School of Speech and Drama in the 1960s.

== Career ==
After graduating, Mahoney worked with Colchester Rep and the Mercury Theatre before joining the Royal Shakespeare Company in 1967 – he was one of the first black actors in the Company. He worked regularly on the stage throughout his career including shows at the National Theatre, Young Vic, Royal Court, Almeida and his final stage performances were in Alan Bennett's Allelujah! at the Bridge Theatre in 2018.

He helped found Performers Against Racism in the 1980s to campaign against apartheid in South Africa and was Joint Vice President of Equity between 1994 and 1996.

He was seen most frequently on television in series such as: Danger Man, Dixon of Dock Green, Z-Cars, Special Branch, The Troubleshooters, Whatever Happened to the Likely Lads?, Doctor Who (in the stories Frontier in Space, Planet of Evil and "Blink"), Quiller, Fawlty Towers (as Dr Finn in The Germans, 1975), The Professionals (as Dr Henry in the episode "Klansmen", never transmitted on terrestrial TV in the UK, and in "Black Out", again as a doctor), Miss Marple, Yes, Prime Minister, Bergerac, The Bill, Casualty, Holby City and Sea of Souls.

His films included The Plague of the Zombies (1966), Omen III: The Final Conflict (1981), Rise and Fall of Idi Amin (1981), White Mischief (1987), Cry Freedom (1987), Shooting Fish (1997), Wondrous Oblivion (2003) and Shooting Dogs (2005).

He featured in the Channel 4 documentary Random (2011), and in the BBC Three drama Being Human (2012) as Leo, an aged and dying werewolf.

Mahoney's last TV appearance was in the Tracy Beaker CBBC spin-off, The Dumping Ground, as Henry Lawrence, the grandfather of Charlie Morris (Emily Burnett).

== Campaign work ==
Mahoney was a long-standing campaigner for racial equality within the acting profession, as a member of the Equity Afro-Asian Committee (previously called the Coloured Actors Committee until he renamed it), founding Performers Against Racism to defend Equity policy on South Africa, and as co-creator, with Mike Phillips and Taiwo Ajai, of the UK's Black Theatre Workshop in 1976.

== Personal life ==
Mahoney was married in 1971 and later divorced, and had daughters. For decades a resident in Hampstead, London, Mahoney lived on the corner of Gayton Road and Willow Road, and was a regular in local pubs. He was athletic and played cricket as a fast bowler, joining the Gentlemen of Hampstead club.

== Death ==
In 2016, Mahoney was diagnosed with cancer. He died on 28 June 2020, aged 81. His funeral took place at Hampstead Parish, attended by his friends and community.

== Legacy ==
The Louis Mahoney Scholarships at the Royal Central School of Speech and Drama were initiated in his memory to encourage applications from Black and global majority students, beginning from the academic year 2021/22, supporting one undergraduate and one postgraduate candidate in each of the following three years.

== Filmography ==
Year	Title	Role	Notes
1964	Guns at Batasi	Soldier	Uncredited
1965	Curse of Simba	African expert	
1966	The Plague of the Zombies	Coloured Servant	
1967	Prehistoric Women	Head Boy	
1970	Praise Marx and Pass the Ammunition	Julius	
1973	Live and Let Die	Fillet of Soul Patron (New York)	Uncredited
1973	Doctor Who	Newscaster	Serial: Frontier in Space, 2 episodes
1974	Whatever Happened to the Likely Lads?	Frank	Episode: "In Harm's Way"
1975	Doctor Who	Ponti	Serial: Planet of Evil, 2 episodes
1975	Fawlty Towers	Doctor Finn	Episode: "The Germans"
1975	The Fight Against Slavery	Olaudah Equiano	
1981	Omen III: The Final Conflict	Brother Paulo	
1981	Rise and Fall of Idi Amin	Freedom fighter Ofumbi	
1984	Sheena	Elder 1	
1987	Cry Freedom	Lesotho government official	
1987	White Mischief	Abdullah	
1987	The Lenny Henry Show	Jake	
1997	Shooting Fish	Magistrate	
2003	Wondrous Oblivion	Mr. Johnson	
2005	Shooting Dogs	Sibomana	
2005	Holby City	Raymond Opoku	1 episode
2007	Doctor Who	Old Billy	Episode: "Blink"
2012-13	Being Human	Leo	2 episodes
2013	Captain Phillips	Maersk Alabama Crew	
2016	Holby City	Thomas Law	1 episode
2018	National Theatre Live: Allelujah!	Neville	
2018	The Dumping Ground	Henry Lawrence	

== Theatre ==
Year	Show	Role	Theatre
?	Talking To You	Various	Duke of York's Theatre
?	Cato Street	Conspirator	Young Vic
?	Jesus Christ Superstar	Caiaphas	Gaiety Theatre, Dublin
?	Murderous Angels	Diallo Diop	Gaiety Theatre, Dublin
1967	Coriolanus	Lieutenant to Aufidius	Royal Shakespeare Company
1967	Romeo and Juliet	Musician	Royal Shakespeare Company
1970	Robinson Crusoe	Friday	Mercury Theatre
1970	Night and Day	President Mageeba	Watford Palace Theatre
1970	Hutch Builder to Her Majesty	Various	Theatre Royal, Drury Lane
1970	White Devil	Antonelli	Oxford Playhouse
1970	I am Tomarienka	Various	Watermill Theatre
1990	Desire	Kindo	Almeida
1997	Romeo & Juliet	Friar John and Monatague	Royal Shakespeare Company
2007	Generations	Grandfather	Young Vic
2009	As You Like It	Adam and Sir Oliver Martext	Leicester Curve
2009	The Observer	Muturi and Dr Durami	Royal National Theatre
2010	Love Thy Sinner	Paul	Royal National Theatre
2011	Truth & Reconciliation	Rwandan Grandfather	Royal Court
2013	Feast	Papa Legba	Young Vic and Royal Court
2018	Allelujah	Neville	Bridge Theatre
