= Faulty Towers The Dining Experience =

Theatre show

An actor playing Basil in a 2008 performance in Edinburgh

Faulty Towers The Dining Experience is a long-running international interactive theatre show, loosely adapted from the original BBC Fawlty Towers television sitcom.

== Origins ==
Originally staged in Brisbane, Australia in 1997, the show was created by Australian writer Alison Pollard-Mansergh, and was the first show to transfer to London's West End from the Edinburgh Fringe Festival in 2012.

The show has since been performed in 43 countries worldwide.

== Staging ==
The two hour immersive comedy show is largely improvised, and centres on a three-course meal served to audience members by characters based upon, and with the same names as, those featured in the original Fawlty Towers TV programme. It is managed by production company Interactive Theatre International, formerly known as Imagination Workshop.

Basil and Manuel in a 2015 Dutch performance

After running simultaneous productions across Australia and the UK, the show made its debut in Ireland and the Netherlands in 2008, and Belgium, Bahrain, Denmark and Dubai in 2011.

From 2012-2017, the show was performed in Asia, Africa, Europe and the Caribbean, including Thailand, Cyprus, South Africa, Sweden, Iceland, the Philippines, Malaysia, Antigua and Papua New Guinea.

The show made its debut in London's West End on 26 October 2012 Charing Cross Hotel, being the first Edinburgh Fringe show to transfer. Following a five year residency at the venue, it later transferred to the Kings Way Hall hotel in 2017, and later to the Radisson Blu Hotel until 2021. Following the COVID Pandemic in 2022, the show reopened in the President Hotel where it is currently resident.

As of 2013 the show has a residency at Sydney Opera House, and was performed for a five night run at The Royal Albert Hall in 2012.

== Controversy ==
In 2016 the original creator of Fawlty Towers John Cleese challenged the legal validity of the production on Twitter. Although no further legal action was pursued by Cleese, the widely publicised dispute led to the cancellation of the show's upcoming US tour.

== In popular culture ==
Faulty Towers The Dining Experience appeared on BBC's The Apprentice on 14 March 2024 as a reward for the episode's task-winning contestants.

From 2008 until 2018, the show partnered with the BBC's Children in Need, running fundraising performances, and appearing in the live broadcast shows.
