= Rick Batalla =

American dramatist

- Occupations: Actor, Playwright, Director
- Years active: 1997 – present

Rick Batalla is an American playwright, actor, and director.

== Biography ==
He grew up in Santa Monica. He has worked both in front of the camera as a series regular (Payne, HUD, True Love), and as a guest star (Married... with Children, Living Single, Brooklyn South, 8 Simple Rules) on various television shows, and in films like Being The Ricardos with Nicole Kidman, Eraser with Arnold Schwarzenegger, and Gia with Angelina Jolie.

Batalla is also involved in LA Theater. He is a founding member of the Troubadour Theater Company, which takes current music, and sets it to the plays of Shakespeare.

== Plays ==
- My Mexican Life
- Blake…Da Musical, Ovation Award-winning musical about Robert Blake
- "CHiPs The Musical"
