= Basil Fawlty =

Fictional character from Fawlty Towers

- Fawlty Towers character
- First appearance: 'A Touch of Class' (1975)
- Last appearance: "Basil the Rat" (1979)
- Created by: John Cleese; Connie Booth
- Based on: Donald Sinclair
- Portrayed by: John Cleese

In-universe information
- Gender: Male
- Occupation: Hotelier
- Affiliation: British Army
- Spouse: Sybil Fawlty
- Nationality: British

Basil Fawlty is the main character of the 1970s British sitcom Fawlty Towers, played by John Cleese. The proprietor of the hotel Fawlty Towers, Basil is an irascible, class-conscious man who aspires to attract British upper-class guests. While cynical and contemptuous toward those he considers vulgar or beneath his standards, he is notably attentive and deferential toward people whose status, manners, or refinement he admires. His attempts to run an efficient hotel, however, usually end in farce. Possessing a dry, sarcastic wit, Basil has become an iconic British comedy character who remains widely known in the United Kingdom.

Cleese would receive the 1980 British Academy Television Award for Best Entertainment Performance. In a 2001 poll conducted by Channel 4, Basil was ranked second (to Homer Simpson) on their list of the 100 Greatest TV Characters. Known for his quotable rants, the character was inspired by Donald Sinclair, an eccentric, inhospitable, and boorishly impolite hotel owner whom Cleese had encountered when he stayed at his hotel (Gleneagles Hotel in Torquay, Devon) along with the rest of Monty Python in May 1970.

== Origins ==
Fawlty Towers was inspired by the Monty Python group's stay at the Gleneagles Hotel in Torquay. Cleese and Booth stayed on at the hotel after filming for the Python show had finished. The owner, former Royal Navy Lieutenant Commander Donald Sinclair, was very rude to the guests and had an explosive temper, once throwing a bus timetable at a guest who asked when the next bus to town would arrive and placing Eric Idle's suitcase, which contained a ticking alarm clock, behind a wall in the garden in the fear it contained a bomb.

He also denounced Minneapolis-born Monty Python group member Terry Gilliam's table manners as "too American" (Gilliam had his fork in what Sinclair considered to be the wrong hand while eating). Cleese used the name "Donald Sinclair" for his character in the 2001 film Rat Race. In the episode "The Builders", Fawlty refers to a local hotel or restaurant called "Gleneagles" while talking to Miss Gatsby and Miss Tibbs. Cleese once lived in London's Basil Street.

== Personality ==
Basil, who runs the titular hotel in Torquay, is an anxious, status-conscious, and sharp-tongued man. He craves respect and belonging among the upper class, but his insecurity and need for control often drive him to lash out and sabotage himself. In the episode "Communication Problems," Spanish hotel waiter Manuel said Basil is from Swanage. He is roughly in his mid-to-late 40s at the time of the show. Basil is alleged to have served in the British Army. He once claims: "I fought in the Korean War, you know. I killed four men" to which his wife sarcastically replies, "He was in the Catering Corps; he used to poison them". He often wears military ties, and sports a military-type moustache. He also claims to have sustained a shrapnel injury to his leg, which has a tendency to flare up at convenient moments – usually when Sybil asks him an awkward question. He is shown to have a fondness for classical music, often playing pieces by composers such as Chopin, Tchaikovsky, and Brahms in the hotel.

Basil mainly aspires to attract "respectable" hotel guests from titled members of the British upper class and invariably refers to his overwhelmingly working class-accented guests as "plebs" and "riff-raff". By contrast, Basil's wife Sybil often has to deal with the fallout of his horrible behaviour, with varying degrees of success. Basil is generally desperate to avoid his wife's wrath, and his plans often conflict with hers, but he mostly fails to stand up to her. She is often verbally abusive towards him (describing him as "an ageing, brilliantined stick insect") and though he is much taller than Sybil, he often finds himself on the receiving end of her temper, expressed both verbally and physically.

Basil has been married to Sybil since the 1960s, although Sybil once sarcastically stated that they have been married since 1485. They very rarely show any signs of affection towards one another (in "The Wedding Party" they are shown to sleep in separate beds); in "A Touch of Class", Basil kisses Sybil but she tells him not to, and in "Gourmet Night" Sybil shows affection towards Basil while she is drunk, to which he responds telling her to "drink another vat of wine". "The Anniversary" is one of the few episodes in which Basil tries to be nice to Sybil, who misreads the situation and believes he has forgotten their anniversary. They are largely irritated by each other’s presence; their marriage is combative, with little respect on either side.

Basil does occasionally manage to gain the upper hand. In "The Kipper and the Corpse", Sybil refuses to help Basil dispose of the body of recently deceased guest Mr. Leeman. Basil gets his revenge towards the end of the episode, when he asks a number of disgruntled guests to direct their complaints towards Sybil. In "The Psychiatrist", he has an argument with Sybil during which Basil calls his wife a "rancorous, coiffured old sow". He often addresses her (in a faux-romantic way) with insults such as "my little nest of vipers". Cleese has made the point that, on account of Basil's inner need to conflict with his wife's wishes, "Basil couldn't be Basil if he didn't have Sybil".

Fawlty routinely expresses conservative opinions. For example, in "The Wedding Party", Basil shows open disgust towards a young unmarried couple with an active sex life. In "The Germans", Basil blames the failure of the hotel's fire extinguisher on "bloody Wilson", referring to the then Labour Prime Minister. Basil is also frequently furious about labour unions and strike action – in "A Touch of Class", he launches into a tirade against dustmen and postmen going on strike, and in "The Kipper and the Corpse" he is so enraged by news of a car strike that he fails to notice that one of his guests is dead.

Cleese has also described Fawlty as "buried in the past", as he utterly despises living in the England of the 1970s and instead pines for the "good old days" when the British Empire still existed. Basil also often mentions British military history, but never battles in which the British Armed Forces were anything other than victorious.

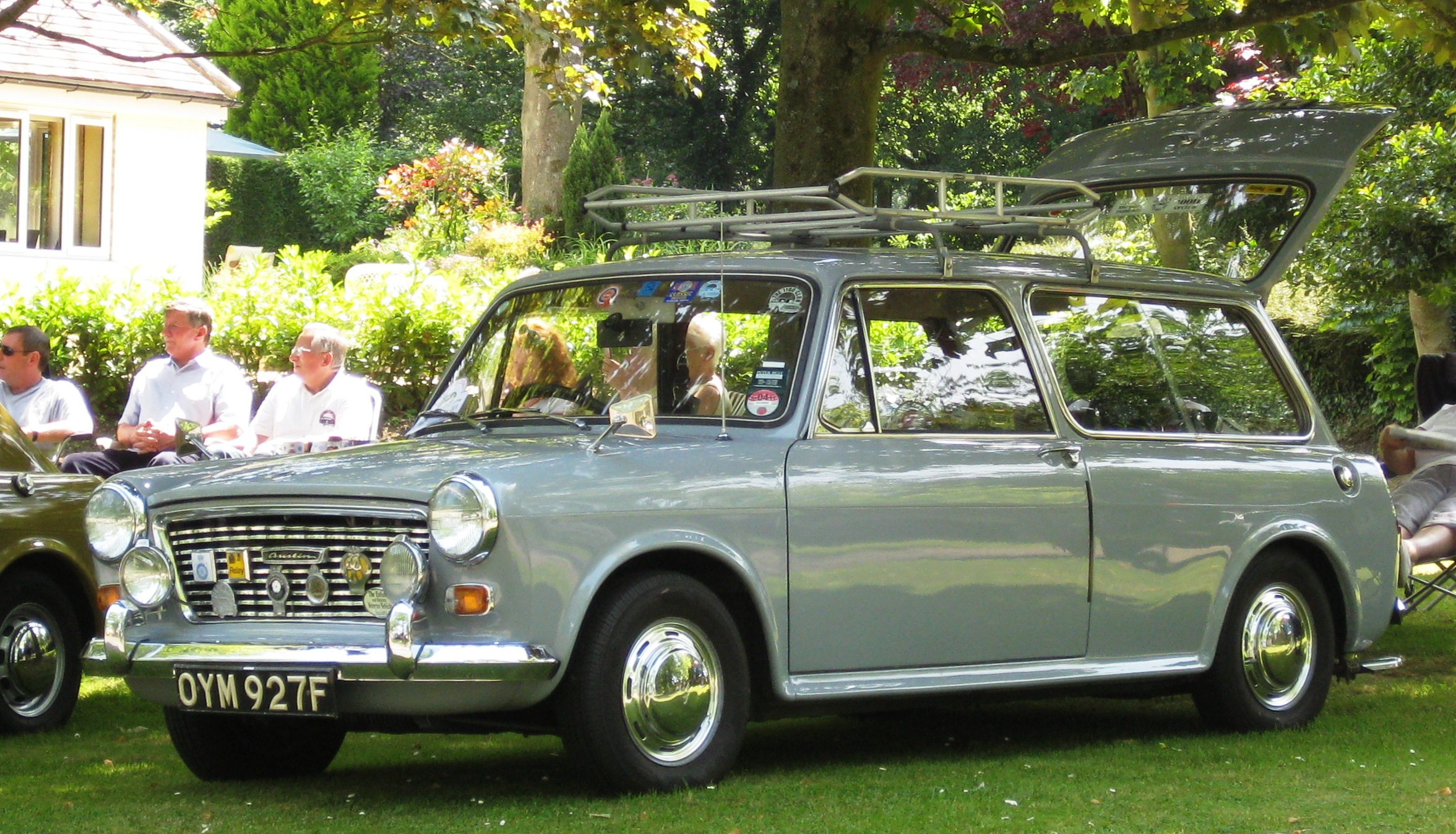
Austin 1100 Mk.I Countryman. A red version was immortalised in the Fawlty Towers episode "Gourmet Night". When the car breaks down and won't start, Basil gets out and tells it, "I'm going to give you a damn good thrashing", before he starts beating it with a branch.

Basil takes many of his frustrations out on the hapless waiter Manuel, physically abusing and bullying him in a variety of ways. The relationship between Basil Fawlty and Manuel has been the subject of academic discourse. On occasions he also assaults others, such as choking a guest in "The Hotel Inspectors", kneeing Major Gowen in "Basil the Rat", "accidentally" elbowing a young boy in the head in "Gourmet Night" and, in the same episode, famously beating his "vicious bastard" of a car with a tree branch when it breaks down.

Another eccentricity affecting Basil is that of occasionally swapping words around in a sentence while propounding a falsehood, for instance in "The Anniversary" when he announces to the party guests that "it's perfectly Sybil! Simple's not well. She's lost her throat and her voice hurts", and – less obviously – reassuring himself as much as his wife in "The Wedding Party" that the sound of knocking on his bedroom door was "probably some key who forgot the guest for their door". He also has difficulty disconnecting his thought process from unrelated events, as in "The Wedding Party", when he is looking through Polly's sketchbook of life-drawing pictures and answers the telephone with, "Hello, Fawlty Titties?" or in "The Psychiatrist", where, after inadvertently staining a female guest with paint, he realises that Sybil has noticed, and in a panic puts his hands on the guest's breasts as a means of stopping her from seeing it.

His desire to elevate his class status is exemplified in the unusual care and respect he affords upper class guests, such as Lord Melbury (who turned out to be a con man and an impostor), Mrs Peignoir (a wealthy French antiques dealer) and Major Gowen, an elderly ex-soldier and recurring character – although Basil is sometimes exasperated by him, frequently alluding to his senility and his frequenting of the hotel bar ("drunken old sod"). He has particular respect for doctors, having once aspired to be one himself, and shows a reverential attitude to Dr. Abbott in "The Psychiatrist" (until he learns that Dr Abbott is a psychiatrist), and Dr Price in "The Kipper and the Corpse" (until Dr Price begins to ask awkward questions about the death of Mr. Leeman, and inconveniently requests sausages for breakfast).

Basil is constantly spiteful and abusive to guests, and liable to pick up a tail-end of a situation (often panicking when things go wrong) and turn it into a farcical misunderstanding. Basil is known for his tight-fisted attitude to the hotel's expenses, employing completely incompetent builder O'Reilly in "The Builders" simply because he was cheap. Basil frequently becomes indignant at guests' requests, even reasonable ones, although he is considerably more accommodating toward those he perceives as wealthy, distinguished, or upper-class.

== Reprisals ==
John Cleese portrayed Basil in a 1980 special for the British rock band, Queen. Basil is seen at a bar and is asked what he thinks of Queen, to which he shows disgust and calls the music "rock rubbish." He asks, "What do you need that for when you got Beethoven?"

John Cleese reprised the role of Basil in the song "Don't Mention the World Cup", an allusion to "don't mention the war" from the Fawlty Towers episode "The Germans", for the 2006 FIFA World Cup, which was played in Germany.

Cleese appeared as Basil in a 2016 TV advertisement for Specsavers during which, in a reference to the Fawlty Towers episode "Gourmet Night" where the character thrashes his car with a branch, Basil accidentally attacks an adjacent police car, mistaking it for his own.

In February 2023, a revival of Fawlty Towers was announced with Cleese reprising the role as an older Basil still running the hotel whilst trying to fit into the modern world.

== Adaptations ==
When Fawlty Towers was remade for American television, the character of Basil Fawlty was also remade. In the 1978 remake Snavely, Basil's character is recreated as loud-mouthed Henry Snavely. In Amanda's, the character was recreated somewhat as the rude Amanda Cartwright, and in Payne, the character appeared as meddlesome Royal Payne.

In Hotel de Botel (the Dutch adaptation of Fawlty Towers), the Basil character was called Koos Overwater and was played by Dutch comedian and actor Andre van Duin.

== Cultural references ==
In the British fantasy series Redwall, an extremely sarcastic and imprudent anthropomorphic hare, "Basil Stag Hare", makes an appearance. Author Brian Jacques claims to have based his name and character on Basil Fawlty.

In the 2004 film Shrek 2, John Cleese's character of King Harold references the character by using Fawlty's excuse of "war wound shrapnel" with "Just the old Crusade wound playing up a bit".

In the 2016 film Deadpool, the titular character (played by Ryan Reynolds) asks Ajax (played by Ed Skrein) what his name is. He asks many names and one of them is Basil Fawlty.

In the 2016 expansion Blood and Wine for the video game The Witcher 3: Wild Hunt, there is a character named Barnabas-Basil Foulty who acts as Geralt's majordomo.

In the comedy-drama anthology series The White Lotus, resort manager Armand (played by Murray Bartlett) bears a strong physical resemblance to Basil Fawlty. Like Basil he frequently displays erratic and sarcastic behaviour and is highly antagonistic towards certain guests.
