= John Howard Davies =

English actor and filmmaker (1939–2011)

- Davies in 1951 when he was 12
- Born: 9 March 1939; Paddington, London, England
- Died: 22 August 2011 (aged 72); Blewbury, Oxfordshire, England
- Other name: JHD
- Occupations: Director, producer, child actor
- Years active: 1944–1996
- Children: 2
- Father: Jack Davies

John Howard Davies (9 March 1939 – 22 August 2011) was an English director, producer and actor. As a child actor, he became famous for appearing in the title role of David Lean's film adaptation of Oliver Twist (1948). After joining the BBC as a production assistant in 1966, Davies became a hugely influential television director and producer, specialising in comedy.

Davies played a key role in British television comedy across four decades, working variously as the commissioning producer, producer or director on many of the most successful comedy shows of the era, including The World of Beachcomber, Steptoe and Son, All Gas and Gaiters, The Benny Hill Show, Monty Python's Flying Circus, The Goodies, Fawlty Towers, The Fall and Rise of Reginald Perrin, Not the Nine O'Clock News, Only Fools and Horses, Yes Minister, Blackadder and Mr. Bean. Davies was the producer of all four series of the sitcom The Good Life, and was also responsible for ending Benny Hill's television career in the late 1980s.

== Early life ==
Davies was born on 9 March 1939 in Paddington, London, the son of Jack Davies, a film critic and prolific scriptwriter for mainly Gainsborough and Elstree studios, and the novelist Dorothy Davies.

After a basic education at Haileybury School, he gained further education in Grenoble, France, followed by national service in the Navy.

== Career ==
=== Child actor ===
Known to his friends as JHD, Davies' credits as a child actor include the title role at the age of nine in David Lean's production Oliver Twist (1948), followed by The Rocking Horse Winner (1949), Tom Brown's Schooldays (1951) and a few episodes of the TV series William Tell (1958).

=== Adult career ===
After being discharged from the Navy, Davies worked in the City of London financial sector, and then as a carpet salesman. He relocated to Melbourne, Australia, where he returned to acting and met his first wife, Leonie, when they both appeared in The Sound of Music. He was stage manager for The Sound of Music for two years touring Australia and New Zealand.

He is best known for his adult career as a director and producer of several highly successful British sitcoms. Returning to the UK, Davies became a BBC production assistant during 1966, and was promoted to producer in 1968. During this early period, Davies worked on sketch shows such as The World of Beachcomber (1968); he produced and directed the first four episodes of Monty Python's Flying Circus (1969) (as well as defending the series against its detractors within the BBC), as well as the first two seasons of The Goodies (1970–72), including the classic "Kitten Kong" episode, which won the Silver Rose of Montreux Eurovision TV award. Davies directed a young Anthony Hopkins in the first episode of the Biography series, and also worked on All Gas and Gaiters (1969–70) and the seventh series of Steptoe and Son in 1972.

He briefly left the BBC to become managing director of EMI Television Productions in 1973, but soon returned to the corporation. Davies produced and directed the first series of Fawlty Towers (1975). Casting Prunella Scales as Sybil Fawlty was Davies' idea. The actress originally sought turned down the part. He is also credited with the idea of having the comedic changes to the lettering on the hotel sign in each episode, as well as the slapstick device of having Basil hit Manuel on the head with a spoon. Davies additionally served as producer for The Good Life (1975–78).

He was the BBC's Head of Comedy from 1977 to 1982, before joining Thames Television in 1985. Thames was then an ITV contractor, for which Davies was head of Light Entertainment from 1988. During the last role, he was cited by the popular press as the man who fired comedian Benny Hill when the company decided not to renew his contract after a connection lasting 20 years. He told Hill's biographer Mark Lewisohn, "It's very dangerous to have a show on ITV that doesn't appeal to women, because they hold the purse strings, in a sense."

Davies subsequently produced No Job for a Lady (1990–1992), Mr. Bean (1990) and Hope It Rains (1991–1992), before returning to the BBC later in the 1990s. His final work was overseeing the Easter Special of The Vicar of Dibley in 1996.

== Personal life ==
Davies was a noted target shooter, competing in fullbore target rifle and 300 metre rifle disciplines. He appeared in the final of HM the Queen's Prize in 1994, and represented Wales at the first Commonwealth Shooting Championships in New Delhi, where he claimed a silver medal in the 300 m rifle three positions team event. He competed for Wales in the MacKinnon match 16 times, serving as Team Captain in 1994 and 1995.

== Death ==
Davies died from prostate cancer at the age of 72 on 22 August 2011 at his home in Blewbury, Oxfordshire.

== Filmography ==
=== Film ===
Year	Title	Role	Ref.
1948	Oliver Twist	Oliver Twist	
1949	The Rocking Horse Winner	Paul Grahame	
1951	Tom Brown's Schooldays	Tom Brown	
1951	The Magic Box	Maurice Friese-Greene	
