= Polly Sherman =

Fictional character from the British sitcom Fawlty Towers

- Fawlty Towers character
- First appearance: 'A Touch of Class' (1975)
- Last appearance: 'Basil the Rat' (1979)
- Created by: John Cleese; Connie Booth
- Portrayed by: Connie Booth

In-universe information
- Gender: Female
- Occupation: Waitress; Maid
- Nationality: British

Polly Sherman is a fictional character in the BBC sitcom Fawlty Towers. Played by Connie Booth, she is Fawlty Towers' long-suffering waitress and hotel maid.

== Personality ==
Polly is the hotel waitress during the series, and one of only four staff members seen there, the others being Manuel, Terry and short lived chef Kurt. Although she at one point claims to be employed part-time, she is shown working there as a maid, and is occasionally saddled with more duties than this, which she will often go along with for the extra money.

Polly is, by far, the most sensible character in the series, and often stands as the voice of sanity during Basil's frequent escapades. However, she frequently finds herself embroiled in ridiculous masquerades (such as pretending to be the voice of Mr. Stubbs' secretary in "The Builders" or pretending that money Basil won on a horse was hers in "Communication Problems") owing to her immense loyalty towards Basil. She will usually take his side over Sybil's to avoid being fired, and try hard to keep secrets of his from her. However, she does occasionally stand up to Basil whenever he acts particularly irrationally, such as slapping him when he throws a fit.

Although Polly is generally level-headed and intelligent, she occasionally shows signs of malice. Notably, in "The Kipper and the Corpse", after being bitten by the dog of an elderly guest, she laced its sausages with hot pepper, tabasco sauce and chilli powder, giving it a nasty stomach ache. In "Communication Problems", Polly joins Basil in insulting the demanding Mrs. Richards and impishly presents Manuel to her, knowing Manuel's poor English would infuriate Mrs Richards more. In "Basil the Rat", she attempts to get a man to purchase a painting she made, including lying that "It's for my sister's eye operation"; when he declines, she says "You bastard."

It is mentioned in the first series that Polly is an art student, which she has been studying for three years. It is not entirely clear what kind of art, or how good she is at it – in one episode, she draws an impressionist caricature of Basil (which everyone except Basil recognises). In "Gourmet Night", she sells the new chef, Kurt, a portrait she's drawn of Manuel, and Sybil offers to buy one too, to annoy Basil. In "The Wedding Party", after Basil complains about her leaving a life drawing sketchbook lying around, and wearing a revealing top, he flicks through it and absentmindedly answers the phone "Hello, Fawlty Titties?"

Polly also speaks foreign languages, occasionally serving as a translator to Manuel and communicating in German to hotel guests in "The Germans". She is short of money and in "The Anniversary" is desperate to borrow £100 from Basil to buy a car.

== Character development and portrayal ==
Booth, who had not done television acting in front of an audience before, wanted to keep Polly as a relatively minor character. According to Cleese, they realised Polly would be a "beacon of sanity", whose sense of "instinctive decency" leads her to save Basil from his foibles. He credits Booth's performance in a scene of "The Anniversary", where she argues with Basil over his plan for Polly to impersonate Sybil in order to save his embarrassment, as "marvellous":

"Waitress"?! That's a joke! I help out at reception, I clean the rooms, I deal with the tradesmen, I mend the switchboard, I change the fuses, and if you think my duties now include impersonating members of your family, you have got one more screw loose than I thought!"
