= Manuel (Fawlty Towers) =

Fictional character from British TV series

- Fawlty Towers character
- First appearance: A Touch of Class (1975)
- Last appearance: We Are Most Amused (2008)
- Created by: John Cleese; Connie Booth
- Portrayed by: Andrew Sachs

In-universe information
- Gender: Male
- Occupation: Waiter
- Origin: Barcelona, Spain
- Nationality: Spanish

Manuel is a fictional character from the BBC sitcom Fawlty Towers, played by Andrew Sachs. He reappeared for a small sketch with John Cleese in We Are Most Amused in November 2008.

Manuel himself appeared on the audio adaptations of Fawlty Towers as a linking narrator, explaining things from his point of view, when the series was released in audio format. The first two episodes released did not feature him at all, as the dialogue was edited and a short burst of piano music would indicate a change of scene. However, when the whole series was re-released, they were re-edited with Manuel's linking commentary.

== Personality ==
Manuel is a well-meaning but dim, disorganised, and constantly confused Spanish waiter from Barcelona with a limited grasp of the English language and customs. He is constantly verbally and physically assaulted by his boss, and often used as a scapegoat for the various disasters that befall the hotel – even when they are not his fault. He is afraid of Basil's quick temper and violent assaults, yet often expresses his appreciation for being given the position. On the other hand, whenever Manuel appears sad, Basil is depicted attempting to cheer him up, and even kisses him on the forehead for his aid in ejecting a particularly abusive guest, indicating that he holds at least some loyalty to Manuel. Sybil also appears to hold Manuel in low esteem, dryly remarking, "It'd be quicker to train a monkey." Despite this, she does show considerably more loyalty to him than Basil, as she stands up for him in "Basil the Rat". When told by either Basil, Sybil or Polly what to do, he frequently answers "Sí" ("Yes"), or "¿Qué?" ("What?") or "¿Cómo?" (a more polite way of "What?"), which once led to a particularly harebrained guest (Mrs. Richards) believing Basil's name to be "C. K. Watt". By the time of the second series, Manuel's English is shown to have improved, while still limited.

Basil hired Manuel because he was very cheap labour. Basil's excuse for everything Manuel does wrong is "he's from Barcelona", an excuse that Sybil and even Manuel himself once resorted to.

Manuel is good friends with Polly, who can communicate best with him (Basil claims to have learnt "classical Spanish", whereas Polly speaks the actual language) and often uses him as a model for her sketches. Basil also suggests she take him to the local ice rink in "Basil the Rat".

He is known for his passionate patriotism, amplified in "The Anniversary" when he tries to make Terry the chef let him cook a seafood paella to his mother's recipe. Manuel has a large family in Spain, mentioning in "The Wedding Party" that he has five brothers and four sisters.

During the episode "Basil the Rat", Manuel acquires a common rat while under the impression that it is a Siberian hamster, and names it Basil, after his boss. He becomes very emotionally attached to the rat, and even threatens to leave Fawlty Towers altogether if Basil and Sybil dispose of it, to which Basil immediately responds, "Well, goodbye." The episode also highlights the fact that Manuel is rather dim even without the language barrier, as he lets the rat out of its cage for some exercise (which leads to the rat ending up loose in the hotel), manages to spell "Spleep" from S-L-E-E-P, and pronounces cholesterol as "costellorol", even though the two words are quite similar in English and Spanish (colesterol).

== Origins ==
Sachs claimed that he only had a few weeks to learn the difficult and complex accent that Manuel is so famous for (in fact, having lived in Germany until he was eight, Sachs initially suggested playing a German waiter), but loved his experiences on the show and still had Manuel's attire. Sachs suffered two serious injuries during Fawlty Towers. In "The Wedding Party", he was almost knocked unconscious after being hit over the head with a frying pan (after John Cleese accidentally picked up a real frying pan instead of a rubber-padded prop) and in "The Germans", he suffered second degree burns from a fire.

== Dubbing ==
For the Spanish dub of the show broadcast in Spain, the character was changed to an Italian from Naples called Paolo (and in The Anniversary, his desire to make paella is changed to lasagna). In the Catalan TV3 channel (based in Barcelona), Manuel's origin was changed to Mexico City and the character has a Mexican accent. The French version also gives his nationality as Mexican. In the Basque ETB 1 channel the character kept the name Manuel and Spanish nationality.

In scenes in which Manuel appears there are several references to Spain, and to General Franco, who was still alive when the first six episodes of the show were broadcast. In The Builders, when Bennion the delivery man says "No no, where's the real boss?... The... the generalissimo.", Manuel looks at him daftly: "In Madrid!". Since the Catalan version was broadcast in 1986, eleven years after Francisco Franco's death, the dubbing of Manuel says "Dead!". In "Basil the Rat", Basil says to Manuel, "You have rats in Spain, don't you – or did Franco have them all shot?"

== In popular culture ==
The Swedish pop group I'm from Barcelona chose its name in reference to this character.

The movie-mocking television program Mystery Science Theater 3000 has referred to Manuel on several occasions. When a character on screen speaks with a Spanish accent, the riffers would often respond with "I'm so sorry, he's from Barcelona".

Sachs also appeared in a few adverts on British TV in the Manuel persona.

Sachs made a cameo appearance in We Are Most Amused, as an aged Manuel.
