= Sybil Fawlty =

Fictional character from Fawlty Towers

- Fawlty Towers character
- First appearance: 'A Touch of Class' (1975)
- Last appearance: Children in Need (2007)
- Created by: John Cleese; Connie Booth
- Portrayed by: Prunella Scales

In-universe information
- Gender: Female
- Occupation: Hotelier
- Family: Ted (uncle)
- Spouse: Basil Fawlty (husband)
- Nationality: British

Sybil Fawlty is a fictional character from the BBC sitcom Fawlty Towers and portrayed by Prunella Scales. She is the wife of Basil Fawlty and the co-owner of the hotel.

== Personality ==
As Basil Fawlty's wife, and the only regular character in the series who usually refers to him by his first name (Major Gowen addresses Basil by his first name in "Communication Problems"). Sybil is a far more effective worker and manager than Basil; she handles crises calmly, picks up the pieces after a nasty confrontation and stays polite to guests. Unlike Basil, who yearns to turn Fawlty Towers into "an establishment of class", catering exclusively to the highborn members of society, Sybil is more realistic and down-to-earth when it comes to clientele, and all that concerns her is the hotel making money rather than the class of guest who stays there. Despite her effectiveness as a worker, she is known to be extremely lazy; during busy check-in sessions or meal times, while everyone else is busy working around her, she is frequently seen talking on the phone to one of her friends (usually Audrey, who makes an appearance in "The Anniversary"), smoking, chatting with customers, or reading Harold Robbins' novels. In "The Kipper and the Corpse", she does little to help Basil, Manuel and Polly with the disposal of Mr. Leeman's body, prompting Basil to direct all the complaints to her. He does the same trick in "Waldorf Salad". Basil is utterly terrified of Sybil, describing her to Irish builder O'Reilly in "The Builders" as having the ability to "kill a man at ten paces with one blow of her tongue."

Sybil is the strong figure in the marriage, as Basil is completely incapable of handling even the simplest of tasks. In "The Germans" Sybil is in hospital for less than a whole morning, and in that short period, Basil succeeds in infuriating the guests with an argument over the specific time of a fire drill, setting off a burglar alarm and getting jammed underneath a desk.

Despite this, Basil has attempted to defy Sybil face to face, yet she manages to silence him with one sharp bark of "Basil!", except for one moment in "The Psychiatrist", when Basil is driven to his breaking point and angrily lashes out at her, calling her a "rancorous, coiffured old sow" to her face. A few times, Basil has infuriated Sybil to the point of violence; in "The Builders", she flies into a rage and throws a cash box across the room toward her husband, who only just manages to avoid it, after which she kicks him on the shin and strikes him with an umbrella. In "Waldorf Salad", meanwhile, she strikes Basil across the face after he refuses to surrender the titular dish to a guest. She also slapped him in "The Anniversary", after she believed he had again forgotten their anniversary. She also implies that the last time he forgot, she gave him a "severe beating" and was “flayed alive”.

She is characterised by a shrill conversational tone and laugh, which Basil compares to "someone machine-gunning a seal". Basil also refers to her by a number of epithets, occasionally to her face, including; "the dragon", "that golfing puff adder", "toxic midget", "my little nest of vipers", "sabre-toothed tart", "my little piranha fish", "my little workhorse" and "my little Kommandant." She either does not hear, as he often states them as soon as she is out of earshot, or does not care. In "The Psychiatrist", she calls him "an ageing, brilliantined stick insect".

Sybil and Basil never directly express love for one another (in "The Wedding Party", they are shown to sleep in separate beds; in "A Touch of Class" Basil kisses her and she tells him not to), and Basil especially never seems to be capable of courtesy towards his wife – in "Gourmet Night", while drunk, Sybil shows Basil affection, only for him to tell her to drink "another vat of wine." In "The Hotel Inspectors", after Basil is beaten up and knocked to the floor by an angry guest, Sybil casually walks by Basil and cheerfully asks, "you've handled that then, have you Basil?" In "The Anniversary", one of Basil's escapades – making her think he had forgotten their wedding anniversary – brings Sybil to tears, though, ironically, this was one of the few episodes in which Basil was thinking of someone besides himself and preparing to show some compassion towards Sybil, and in "Communication Problems" Basil does tell Sybil that he loves her. The same episode reveals that Sybil does not approve of gambling and has forbidden Basil to partake in it; the main plot of this episode is that Basil is secretly gambling, and Sybil eventually finds out.

Sybil is the archetypal nagging wife, getting in the way of Basil "enjoying himself" when he squabbles with the guests by forcing him to do chores. Notable examples of this appear in the episodes "A Touch of Class" and "The Germans". She sometimes flirts with guests, notably Mr. Johnson (Nicky Henson) in "The Psychiatrist" but gets angry whenever Basil flirts with someone.

Prunella Scales has said that the reason Sybil married Basil was because his origins were of a higher social class than hers; in "Gourmet Night", she recounts an anecdote about "Uncle Ted and his crate of brown ale" while drunk, which implies a working-class background, as do some traces of working-class speech in her accent.

Basil and Sybil married on 17 April 1964 (though Sybil once joked that they married in 1485) and opened their hotel that same year.

== Reappearance ==
In November 2007, Scales returned to the role of Sybil Fawlty in a series of sketches for the BBC's annual Children in Need charity telethon. The character was seen taking over the management of the eponymous hotel from the BBC drama series Hotel Babylon, interacting with characters from that programme as well as other sitcom characters. The character of Sybil was used by special permission of John Cleese.
