= Thriller (British TV series) =

British TV series (1973–1976)

- UK opening titles
- Created by: Brian Clemens
- Country of origin: United Kingdom
- No. of episodes: 43

Production
- Running time: 63–67 min.
- Production company: ATV

Original release
- Network: ITV
- Release: 14 April 1973 – 22 May 1976

Thriller is a British television series, originally broadcast on ITV from 1973 to 1976. It is an anthology series: each episode has a self-contained story and its own cast. As the title suggests, each story is a thriller of some variety, from tales of the supernatural to down-to-earth whodunits.

== Background ==
The series was created by Brian Clemens, who also scripted the majority of the episodes and story-lined every installment. It was produced by John Sichel (the first three series), John Cooper (series 4) and Ian Fordyce (the final two series) for ATV at its Elstree studios north of London. The series evolved from Clemens' previous work, in particular two films in a similar style: And Soon the Darkness (1970) and Blind Terror (aka See No Evil, 1971); the latter shares plot similarities with the Thriller episodes "The Eyes Have It" and "The Next Voice You See". Original music, including the theme tune, was supplied by Clemens' regular collaborator Laurie Johnson.

The original UK title sequence featured still shots of locations in the story, devoid of people, shot through a fisheye lens, bordered in bright red and set to Johnson's eerie, discordant theme music. With an eye to the American re-broadcast market, most episodes, especially from the second season onwards, featured at least one American principal character, portrayed by an American actor. After originally being screened late at night in the U.S. under the ABC's Wide World of Entertainment billing from 1973, some episodes were retitled for U.S. syndication in 1978, and all had additional opening sequences shot with new titles and credits but without the original cast and, for this reason, often only featuring menacing figures seen from the neck down. These title sequences were used in Britain when the series was repeated on regional ITV stations in the 1980s, and are also included as extras on the Complete Series box set. When the series was re-broadcast as part of The CBS Late Movie however, the original title sequences and music were restored.

The stories were often set in the London commuter belt. A particular trademark of the series' storytelling was to hook the viewer with a simple yet totally baffling situation, of the kind seen in films such as Les Diaboliques (1955). "Come Out Come Out, Wherever You Are" takes place at a creaky country house hotel: a female guest begins asking about her missing travelling companion whom the owner claims was not with her upon arrival the previous evening and whom none of the other guests initially recall seeing. One episode, "Screamer", concerns a rape victim who murders her attacker, only to then see the man stalking her everywhere. In the Dial M for Murder-style "The Double Kill", a man hires a hitman to kill his wife, but makes a fatal error in his otherwise meticulous planning.

Other episodes include: "Someone at the Top of the Stairs", one of a handful of forays into the supernatural, in which two female students move into a boarding house and begin to notice that none of the other residents ever goes out or receives any mail; and "I'm The Girl He Wants to Kill", in which a witness to a murder finds herself trapped in a deserted office block overnight with the killer, and has to play a deadly game of cat-and-mouse with him to survive (there is barely any dialogue throughout its second half). Brian Clemens' own favourite episode, "A Coffin for the Bride" (US: Kiss Kiss, Kill Kill), featured a performance from a young Helen Mirren.

Following a worldwide audit during 2003–04 by the then copyright-holders Carlton, almost all the original UK PAL fisheye-titled 2" videotapes of Thriller were located and transferred onto modern digital tape by the British Film Institute, with subsequent restoration work by BBC Resources. One exception was the story "Nurse Will Make It Better"; however, this too exists in PAL/original format on the later 1" videotape format as a dub from the original master tape (this version was broadcast on the satellite channel Bravo in 1996).

In 2008 a DVD box set containing all six series was released. The DVD set also contains the 1974 television film Who Killed Lamb?.

== Episodes ==
For episodes that used a different title in the U.S., the U.S. title is shown in italics underneath the original British title.

=== Series 1 (1973) ===
No. overall	No. in series	Title	Cast	Original release date
1	1	"Lady Killer" "The Death Policy"	Barbara Feldon, Robert Powell, Linda Thorson, T. P. McKenna, Mary Wimbush, John Boswall, Ivor Roberts, Howard Rawlinson, Ronald Mayer, David Billa	14 April 1973
2	2	"Possession"	John Carson, Joanna Dunham, Hilary Hardiman, Athol Coats, James Cossins, Richard Aylen, Jack Galloway, Mary Ann Severne	21 April 1973
3	3	"Someone at the Top of the Stairs"	Donna Mills, Judy Carne, David de Keyser, Francis Wallis, Alethea Charlton, Brian McGrath, Peter Cellier, Clifford Parrish, Scott Forbes, Rhoda Lewis, Alan Roberto, Laura Collins, Richard Corbet, Charles Hill	28 April 1973
4	4	"An Echo of Theresa" "Anatomy of Terror"	Paul Burke, Polly Bergen, Dinsdale Landen, Basil Henson, Vernon Dobtcheff, Meriel Brooke, William Job, Roger Hume, Larry Taylor, Betty Woolfe, Neville Phillips, Ted Richards, John Caesar	5 May 1973
5	5	"The Colour of Blood" "The Carnation Killer"	Norman Eshley, Katherine Schofield, Derek Smith, Garrick Hagon, Geoffrey Chater, Malcolm Terris, Tim Wylton, A. J. Brown, Roy Sone, Eric Mason, Michael Corcoran, Godfrey Jackman	12 May 1973
6	6	"Murder in Mind"	Richard Johnson, Zena Walker, Donald Gee, Ronald Radd, Robert Dorning, Christina Greatrex, Anthony Boden, David Lampson	19 May 1973
7	7	"A Place to Die"	Bryan Marshall, Alexandra Hay, John Turner, Glynn Edwards, Sally Stephens, Juan Moreno, Georgine Anderson, Lila Kaye, Sydney Bromley, Jenny Laird, Peggy Ann Wood, Graham Weston, Bill Ward, John Flint, Arnold Ridley, Harold Bennett, Elsie Wagstaff, John Gabriel, Lewis Wilson	26 May 1973
8	8	"File It Under Fear"	Maureen Lipman, Richard O'Callaghan, Jan Francis, James Grout, John Le Mesurier, Colin Fisher, Rose Hill, Richard Pendrey, John Nightingale, Jenny Quayle, Georgina Melville, Sue Bond	2 June 1973
9	9	"The Eyes Have It"	Peter Vaughan, Dennis Waterman, William Marlowe, Sinéad Cusack, Leslie Schofield, David Jackson, Michael Lees, Alun Armstrong, Colin McCormack, Angela Walker, Catherine Chase, David Sands	9 June 1973
10	10	"Spell of Evil"	Diane Cilento, Edward de Souza, Jeremy Longhurst, Jennifer Daniel, William Dexter, Iris Russell, Martin Wyldeck, Philip Anthony, Linda Cunningham, David Belcher, Reg Lye, Patricia Kneale	16 June 1973

=== Series 2 (1974) ===
No. overall	No. in series	Title	Cast	Original release date
11	1	"Only a Scream Away"	Hayley Mills, Gary Collins, Joyce Carey, David Warbeck, Jeremy Bulloch, Jonathan Elsom, Ronald Mayer, Barrie Fletcher, Richard Beaumont, Candida Brown	26 January 1974
12	2	"Once the Killing Starts"	Patrick O'Neal, Angharad Rees, Michael Kitchen, Gerald Sim, Gary Watson, Patricia Donahue, Terry Wright	2 February 1974
13	3	"Kiss Me and Die" "The Savage Curse"	Jenny Agutter, George Chakiris, Anton Diffring, Russell Hunter, John Sharpe, Stephen Greif, Peggy Sinclair, John Atkinson, Barry James, Raymond Mason, Sue Robinson, Peter Casillas, Peter Elliott	9 February 1974
14	4	"One Deadly Owner"	Donna Mills, Jeremy Brett, Robert Morris, Laurence Payne, Eric Lander, Michael Beint, Anthony Dawes, Bob Holness, Ray Marioni	16 February 1974
15	5	"Ring Once for Death" "Death in Small Doses"	Michael Jayston, Nyree Dawn Porter, Barry Nelson, Thorley Walters, Janet Key, Victor Winding, Clare Sutcliffe, Richard Oldfield	23 February 1974
16	6	"K is for Killing" "Color Him Dead"	Gayle Hunnicutt, Stephen Rea, Jean Kent, Christopher Cazenove, Peter Dyneley, Derek Francis, Frances Bennett, Shirley Cain, Oliver Smith, Arthur White, James Appleby, Sally Miles, Francis Mortimer, Gilly Flower	2 March 1974
17	7	"Sign it Death"	Francesca Annis, Patrick Allen, Moira Redmond, Edward Judd, Gerald James, Barry Stanton, James Bate, Sheila Fearn, Jackie Tong, John Arnatt, Leon Eagles, Jeremy Pearce, Carmen Blanck, Alan Bennion, Sonia Graham, Lisa Young, Jimmy Gardner, Stuart Nichol	9 March 1974

=== Series 3 (1974) ===
No. overall	No. in series	Title	Cast	Original release date
18	1	"A Coffin for the Bride" "Kiss Kiss, Kill Kill"	Michael Jayston, Helen Mirren, Michael Gwynn, Richard Coleman, Margaret Courtenay, Josephine Tewson, Arthur English, Tony Steedman, Marcia Fox, Hugh Morton, Richard Hampton, Jeffrey Taylor, Peter Mackriel, Mark Rodbert	1 June 1974
19	2	"I'm the Girl He Wants to Kill"	Robert Lang, Julie Sommars, Tony Selby, Anthony Steel, Ken Jones, Trisha Hooker, Geoffrey Whitehead, Susan Tracy, Colin Haig, Annette Woollett, Patrick Connor, Robert Oates	8 June 1974
20	3	"Death to Sister Mary" "Murder is a One-Act Play"	George Maharis, Robert Powell, Jennie Linden, Anthony Newlands, Joan Haythorne, Derek Fowlds, Leigh Lawson, Gerry Cowan, Windsor Davies, Norman Mitchell, Jill Shakespeare, Maggie Rennie	15 June 1974
21	4	"In the Steps of a Dead Man"	John Nolan, Richard Vernon, Denise Buckley, Faith Brook, Skye Aubrey, Derek Anders, Christopher Benjamin, Anne Robson, John Garvin, Robert Marsh	22 June 1974
22	5	"Come Out, Come Out, Wherever You Are"	Lynda Day George, Peter Jeffrey, John Carson, Colette O'Neil, Bernard Holley, Richard Corbet, Kathleen Mallory, John Line, Molly Weir, Kevin Brennan	29 June 1974
23	6	"The Next Scream You Hear" "Not Guilty!"	Dinsdale Landen, Richard Todd, Suzanne Neve, Edward Hardwicke, Derek Bond, Christopher George, Hans Meyer, Frank Wylie, Andrew Mann, Marian Diamond, Belinda Mayne, Simon Merrick	6 July 1974

=== Series 4 (1975) ===
No. overall	No. in series	Title	Cast	Original release date
24	1	"Screamer"	Pamela Franklin, Donal McCann, Frances White, Jim Norton, Derek Smith, Wolfe Morris, Peter Howell, Harry Walker, Stephen Bateman, Ambrosine Phillpotts, Michael Hall, Carinthia West	4 January 1975
25	2	"Nurse Will Make It Better"	Andrea Marcovicci, Diana Dors, Ed Bishop, Cec Linder, Michael Culver, Linda Liles, Tiffany Kinney, Patrick Troughton, Alan Wilson, John Rapley, Wendy Williams	11 January 1975
25	2	"The Devil's Web" "Night Nurse"	Andrea Marcovicci, Diana Dors, Ed Bishop, Cec Linder, Michael Culver, Linda Liles, Tiffany Kinney, Patrick Troughton, Alan Wilson, John Rapley, Wendy Williams	11 January 1975
26	3	"Night is the Time for Killing" "Murder on the Midnight Express"	Judy Geeson, Charles Gray, Jim Smilie, Jeffry Wickham, Edward Burnham, Anthony Nash, Jacki Piper, Duncan Preston, Milos Kirek, Alister Williamson, Robert MacLeod, Reg Pritchard, Aimée Delamain, Bill Horsley	18 January 1975
27	4	"Killer with Two Faces"	Donna Mills, Ian Hendry, Roddy McMillan, David Lodge, Robin Parkinson, Susan Dury, Jonathan Dennis, Hazel McBride, Seretta Wilson, Christine Shaw, Susannah MacMillan, James Greene, Ralph Ball, John Saunders	25 January 1975
28	5	"A Killer in Every Corner"	Patrick Magee, Joanna Pettet, Max Wall, Eric Flynn, Don Henderson, Petra Markham, Peter Settelen	1 February 1975
29	6	"Where the Action Is" "The Killing Game"	Edd Byrnes, James Berwick, Ingrid Pitt, Trevor Baxter, George Innes, Frank Coda, Oliver McGreevy, Larry Cross, Suzannah Williams, Ray Marioni	8 February 1975

=== Series 5 (1975) ===
No. overall	No. in series	Title	Cast	Original release date
30	1	"If It's a Man, Hang Up"	Carol Lynley, Gerald Harper, David Gwillim, Tom Conti, Michael Byrne, Paul Angelis, John Cater, Colin Etherington, Susan Holderness, Jo Beadle, Michael Cronin, Martin Chamberlain, Beatrice Shaw	12 April 1975
31	2	"The Double Kill"	Gary Collins, James Villiers, Peter Bowles, Stuart Wilson, Penelope Horner, John Flanagan, Hilda Fenemore, Griffith Davies, Michael Stainton, Gordon Salkilld, Norman Mitchell, Paul Nicholson	19 April 1975
32	3	"Won't Write Home Mom - I'm Dead" "Terror from Within"	Ian Bannen, Pamela Franklin, Suzanne Neve, Oliver Tobias, Dallas Adams, Lesley North, Norman Scace, Christopher Malcolm, Anabel Littledale, Diana Patrick, Sarah Porter	26 April 1975
33	4	"The Crazy Kill" "Fear is Spreading"	Denholm Elliott, Anthony Valentine, Tandy Cronyn, Alan Browning, Claire Nielson, Juan Moreno, David Horovitch, Ken Parry, Dennis Chinnery, Brian Haines, Mark Wing-Davey	3 May 1975
34	5	"Good Salary - Prospects - Free Coffin" "Mirror of Deception"	James Maxwell, Kim Darby, Keith Barron, Julian Glover, Susan Dury, Gillian Hawser, John Abineri, Bruce Boa, Janina Faye, Martin Read, Reg Lye, Peter Hill, Julie Crosthwaite, Karl Held, Annette Woollett, Norman Chancer, Christina Palmer, James Greene	10 May 1975
35	6	"The Next Voice You See" "Look Back in Darkness"	Bradford Dillman, Catherine Schell, Geoffrey Chater, Terence Sewards, Nigel Havers, Rachel Davies, Neil Hallett, John Oxley, Annette Lynton, Ian Redford, Roger Mutton, Peter Geddis, Holly Palance, John Forbes-Robertson, Robert Lankesheer, Stan Tracey, Celia Foxe, Anthea Holloway, Paddy Glynn, Hedger Wallace, William Wilde, Eilian Wyn	17 May 1975
36	7	"Murder Motel"	Robyn Millan, Ralph Bates, Edward Judd, Derek Francis, Allan McClelland, John Hallam, Anne Rutter, June Watson, Gillian McCutcheon, Patrick Jordan, Paul Humpoletz, Patrick Tull, Keith Anderson, Lynne Miller, Adrian Shergold, Peter Mackriel	24 May 1975

=== Series 6 (1976) ===
No. overall	No. in series	Title	Cast	Original release date
37	1	"Sleepwalker"	Darleen Carr, Robert Beatty, Michael Kitchen, Ian Redford, Basil Lord, Elaine Donnelly, Eileen Peel, Harry Webster, John Challis, Desmond Jordan, Jane Williams, George Herbert	10 April 1976
38	2	"The Next Victim"	Carroll Baker, T. P. McKenna, Ronald Lacey, Maurice Kaufmann, Max Mason, Ian Gelder, Brenda Cavendish, Martin Benson, Margo Reid, Anita Sharp-Bolster, Paul Haley, Andrea Allan, Martin Fisk, Dorothea Phillips, Harold Bennett, Alan Gerrard, Felicity Harrison, Patsy Dermott	17 April 1976
39	3	"Nightmare for a Nightingale" "Melody of Hate"	Susan Flannery, Keith Baxter, Sydney Tafler, Ronald Leigh-Hunt, Stuart Damon, Gita Denise, Stephen Greif, Peter Hill, Anthony Dawes, Edwin Brown, Michael Dickinson, Mike Kinsey, Charles Cork, Teresa Cahill (singing), Richard Lewis (singing)	24 April 1976
40	4	"Dial a Deadly Number"	Gary Collins, Gemma Jones, Beth Morris, Linda Liles, Cavan Kendall, Peter Schofield, Richard Warner, Charles Lamb, Dennis Blanch	1 May 1976
41	5	"Kill Two Birds" "Cry Terror!"	Susan Hampshire, Gabrielle Drake, David Daker, Dudley Sutton, Bob Hoskins, Rita Giovannini, Stephen Yardley, Bunny May, John Flanagan, Donald Morley, John Bailey, Granville Saxton, William Hoyland, Christopher Ellison, Dawn Perllman	8 May 1976
42	6	"A Midsummer Nightmare" "Appointment with a Killer"	Joanna Pettet, Brian Blessed, Freddie Jones, Norman Rodway, Anthony Pedley, Elsie Randolph, Tony Anholt, John Ruddock, Alison Glennie, Thom Delaney	15 May 1976
43	7	"Death in Deep Water"	Bradford Dillman, Suzan Farmer, Ian Bannen, Philip Stone, Diana Weston, Lawrence James, Anna Marshal, John Gatrell	22 May 1976
