= The Stars Look Down (TV serial) =

1975 British TV series

- Directed by: Roland Joffé; Alan Grint; Howard Baker
- Starring: Ian Hastings; Susan Tracy; Alun Armstrong; Christian Rodska; Norman Jones
- Country of origin: United Kingdom
- Original language: English
- No. of episodes: 13

Production
- Running time: 60 min. (per episode)
- Production company: Granda Television

Original release
- Network: ITV
- Release: 4 September – 27 November 1975

The Stars Look Down is a 1975 British television adaptation written by Alan Plater from A. J. Cronin's 1935 novel The Stars Look Down. The Granada Television production was directed by Roland Joffé, Alan Grint and Howard Baker and starred Ian Hastings as David Fenwick and Susan Tracy as his wife, Jenny. Other versions include a 1940 British film and a 1971 Italian television adaptation.

Set between 1910 and 1930, the story follows the lives of people from the coal mining town of Sleescale in North East England. David Fenwick and Joe Gowlan both leave the mines hoping for better prospects, while the mine owner's son Arthur Barras comes into conflict with his father.

== Cast ==
- Ian Hastings as David Fenwick
- Alun Armstrong as Joe Gowlan
- James Bate as Sammy Fenwick
- Rod Culbertson as Hughie Fenwick
- Geoffrey Davion as Stanley Millington
- Basil Dignam as Richard Barras
- Avril Elgar as Martha Fenwick
- Adrienne Frank as Hetty Todd
- Valerie Georgeson as Laura Millington
- Ronald Herdman as Jim Mawson
- Barbara Hickmott as Hilda Barras
- Norman Jones as Robert Fenwick
- David Markham as Adam Todd
- Ronald Radd as Tom Heddon
- Anne Raitt as Annie Mercer
- Christian Rodska as Arthur Barras
- Catherine Terris as Grace Barras
- Susan Tracy as Jenny Sunley
- Malcolm Terris as Harry Nugent
- James Garbutt as Hudspeth
- John Nightingale as Jack Reedy
- Morrissey as Boy on Bicycle (extra)
- Adam Barak as Boy on beach (extra)
- George Bannister as Sammy Fenwick

== Episodes ==
No.	Title	Directed by	Original release date
1	"Daily Bread"	Roland Joffé	4 September 1975
Unrest among the mine workers causes some to consider other options.
2	"Escape"	Alan Grint	11 September 1975
David Fenwick has an opportunity to leave Sleescale. Joe Gowlan has a new job at a factory in Newcastle and starts seeing Jenny Sunley.
3	"Love"	Roland Joffé	18 September 1975
David Fenwick falls in love with Jenny Sunley. Joe does not want to be tied down and stands aside. The mine workers in Sleescale face changes when mine owner Richard Barras acquires a new contract.
4	"Useful Employment"	Roland Joffé	25 September 1975
Jenny and David Fenwick are married. Joe Gowlan returns to town. David's father Robert Fenwick is worried that the mine will flood.
5	"Inherit the Earth"	Howard Baker	2 October 1975
Robert Fenwick and other miners are trapped when the mine floods.
6	"Battlefield"	Alan Grint	9 October 1975
Richard Barras and his son Arthur are divided over the inquiry into the mining disaster.
7	"Heroes"	Roland Joffé	16 October 1975
During the First World War, David Fenwick joins the army. Joe Gowlan's boss also joins up, leaving Joe in charge of the factory and alone with his boss's wife. The conflict between Arthur Barras and his father comes to a head.
8	"Casualties"	Howard Baker	23 October 1975
As the war continues, David Fenwick receives good news while Joe Gowlan gets a surprise.
9	"Victory"	Alan Grint	30 October 1975
A note is discovered that sheds light on the mine disaster.
10	"Rebuilding"	Roland Joffé	6 November 1975
11	"New Ground"	Howard Baker	13 November 1975
Joe Gowlan becomes successful and David Fenwick reaches a turning point.
12	"The Promised Land"	Alan Grint	20 November 1975
David and his wife Jenny are reunited. The mine is destroyed.
13	"Marrers"	Roland Joffé	27 November 1975
David Fenwick's life comes full circle.
