= Whose Life Is It Anyway? =

Whose Life Is It Anyway may refer to:

- Whose Life Is It Anyway? (1972 television play), television play by English playwright Brian Clark, directed by Richard Everitt
  - Whose Life Is It Anyway? (play), stage adaptation by Brian Clark, opened 1978 (London) and 1979 (New York)
  - Whose Life Is It Anyway? (film), a 1981 adaptation directed by John Badham
  - Whose Life is it Anyway? a novel adaptation by David Benedictus

== See also ==
- Whose Life (Is It Anyways?), a song by Megadeth
- Whose Line Is It Anyway?, a short-form improvisational comedy TV show
