= Heil Caesar =

1973 BBC television drama

Heil Caesar is a 1973 BBC television drama. It was an adaptation by John Bowen of Shakespeare's play Julius Caesar, which was produced by Ronald Smedley. The production designer was Humphrey Jaeger. The adaptation is listed as one of Bowen's achievements in his obituary in The Guardian newspaper. It was originally made in three parts for use with schools and colleges but it was shown again a year later on BBC 2 on 21 October 1974 in a single 90-minute slot. In 1975, the BBC made a further introductory programme for schools to add to the original three episodes, which examined the series in more detail for schools and which included comments from the original cast.

The British Universities Film & Video Council database notes that the adaptation "transforms the play into a modern political conspiracy thriller with modern dialogue and many strong allusions to political events in the early 1970s."

The adaptation changes Shakespeare's text into 20th century English. It was set in what was then a modern 20th century context, although it was clearly shifted slightly into the then near future. There is a reference in the first episode to the imminent return of Halley's Comet, which in 1973 was not due to return for another 13 years, and how it was viewed by some as being a possible portent of the death of kings.

The geographical setting of the story is a melange of 20th century Italy and 20th century UK. Both the formal dress and the combat military uniforms depicted are almost all modelled on the UK army. However, in episode three it is clearly established that the national capital is, like Italy, in the centre of the country and the southern part of the country is depicted as being much warmer than the rest.

At the end of Part 2, Murder of a President some of the social disorder footage used to show the unrest at the pro republic faction's murder of Caesar is actually news footage from the Northern Ireland Troubles which was contemporary to the production of Heil Caesar.

The BFI National Archive holds viewing copies of both the individual parts and the single play. Birmingham Shakespeare Library holds a camera script. The script of Heil Caesar by Bowen was also published as a book by the BBC in 1974.

It was first performed as a stage play by the Humberside Theatre Company at the Midland Arts Theatre.

== Historical and television context ==
The title of Heil Caesar obviously replaces the word "Hail" in "Hail Caesar" with the German "Heil" invoking a connection to the Nazi salute of World War Two Germany.

The play clearly has a central theme about how easily societies can slip into military dictatorship and/or an authoritarian political personality cult, and it was not the first time that Bowen had written for television on that theme. In 1971, just two years previous to the first 1973 TV production of Heil Caesar, John Bowen also wrote seven episodes of the ITV series The Guardians, which also had as a central theme the threat of military dictatorship, and which was also set in the then near future of the 1980s. The idea that modern Western European countries could be subject to military or authoritarian rule was clearly not a fanciful one at that time. Portugal, Greece and Spain were all subject to one or both of those forms of rule in the early 1970s when The Guardians and Heil Caesar were both written and first broadcast.

== Original Episode Titles ==
- Part 1 The Conspirators
- Part 2 Murder of a President
- Part 3 Defeat

== Cast ==
- Brutus: Anthony Bate
- Mark Antony: John Stride
- Messala: Frank Middlemass
- Lepidus: Geoffrey Bayldon
- Caesar: Peter Howell
- Cassius: David Allister
- Portia: Angela Thorne
- Trebonius: Alan Rowe
- Octavius Caesar: Peter Settelen
- Casca: William Simons
- Decius: Arthur Blake
- Publius: John Sterland
- Metellus: Jeffry Wickham
- Aide-de-camp to Messala: Anthony Smee
- Newscaster: Clive Jacobs

== Awards ==
- In March 1974 Ronald Smedley collected the 1974 Rediffusion Flame Of Knowledge Star Award for Heil Caesar. The prize was awarded by the Society for Film and Television Arts for the best educational programme shown during the preceding year.
- Japan International Television Festival Winner
