= Davion =

Davion is a given name and surname. Notable people with the name include:

== Given name ==
- Davion Berry (born 1991), American basketball player
- Davion Davis (born 1997), American football player
- Davion Mintz (born 1998), American football player
- Davion Mitchell (born 1998), American basketball player
- Davion Taylor (born 1998), American football player

== Surname ==
- Alexander Davion (1929–2019), French-born British actor
- Antoine Davion, French missionary
- Geoffrey Davion (1940–1996), English actor
