= John Wycliffe: The Morning Star =

1984 film

John Wycliffe: The Morning Star is a 1984 film about the life and teachings of John Wycliffe (1324–1384). The film, told in flashback, is set entirely on the later years of his life, and deals with his falling out with the Catholic Church, his translation of the Bible into English and propels the common argument that his teachings contributed to the later Protestant Reformation of the 16th century.

This film was directed by Tony Tew.

== Cast ==
- Michael Bertenshaw as "John Purvey"
- James Downie as "Boy"
- Peter Howell as "John Wycliffe"
- Barrie Cookson as "Nicholas Hereford"
- Jeremy Roberts as "Throckmorton"
- Peter Cassell as "Batka"
- Mel Churcher as "Wycliffe's Niece"
- Noel Howlett as "Simon Sudbury"
- Robert James as "William Courtenay"
- Malcolm Terris as "Sheriff"
- Martin Matthews as "Prisoner"
- Sebastian Abineri as "Peasant Husband"
- Anna Lindup as "Peasant Wife"
- Keith Buckley as "John of Gaunt, 1st Duke of Lancaster"
- Colin Russell as "Squire Newberry"
- Christopher Reeks as "Priest"
- Suzanne Church as "Beth"
- Derek Ware as "Peasant"
- Forbes Collins as "Peasant"
- Iain Cuthbertson as "Chancellor Rigg"
- Steven Finch
- Bunny Reed as "Forrest"
- John Moreno as "Benedictine Monk"

== See also ==
- List of historical drama films
