= Late Starter (TV series) =

- Written by: Brian Clark
- Directed by: Barry Davis; Nicholas Mallett
- Starring: Peter Barkworth
- Country of origin: United Kingdom
- Original language: English
- No. of series: 1
- No. of episodes: 8

Production
- Executive producer: Mark Shivas
- Producer: Ruth Boswell
- Running time: 50 min

Original release
- Network: BBC1
- Release: 15 March – 3 May 1985

Late Starter is a 1985 BBC TV series that ran for 8 episodes. Peter Barkworth played a retired university professor who finds himself having to start again in a run down bedsit in North London.

== Cast ==
- Peter Barkworth – Edward Brett
- Akosua Busia – Nicki
- Rowena Cooper – Mary Brett
- Julia Foster – Liz Weldon
- Carol Leader – Penny Johnson
- Simon Cowell-Parker – Simon Brett
