= Hail Caesar =

Hail Caesar may refer to:

- Hail Caesar (1994 film), a comedy directed by Anthony Michael Hall
- Hail, Caesar!, a 2016 comedy film directed by the Coen brothers
- "Hail Caesar" (song), 1995, by AC/DC

== See also ==
- Heil Caesar, a 1973 BBC drama
