= Anna Cropper =

English actress (1938–2007)

- Born: 13 May 1938; Brierfield, Lancashire, England
- Died: 22 January 2007 (aged 68); Tangmere, West Sussex, England
- Other name: Anna Roache
- Education: Royal Central School of Speech and Drama
- Occupation: Actress
- Years active: 1960–1999
- Spouse: William Roache (m. 1961; div. 1974)
- Children: 2, including Linus Roache
- Relatives: Rosalind Bennett (daughter-in-law)

Anna Cropper (13 May 1938 – 22 January 2007) was an English stage and television actress.

== Early years ==
Cropper was born in Brierfield, Lancashire, the daughter of Margaret, a stage actress and director, and Jack Cropper, a dentist. The family lived on Todmorden Road in Burnley during her early life.

== Career ==
Cropper studied acting at the Central School of Speech and Drama in London. She made her television debut as Chrysalis in The Insect Play (1960), based on the 1921 play by Czech brothers Josef and Karel Čapek. She appeared in Emergency Ward 10 three times and on Coronation Street three times in 1962.

She came to prominence playing a young schizophrenic in the television play In Two Minds (The Wednesday Play, BBC, 1967) by David Mercer. which won the Writers' Guild Award for the Best Television Play of 1967.

Her film roles included appearances in All Neat in Black Stockings (1968), Cromwell (1970) and Nanou (1986). In 1972 she starred in the television production of The Exorcism and in 1975 took over the lead role in the West End stage version when actress Mary Ure died of an overdose following the play's opening night.

She played Mary Hodgson, the nurse of the boys who inspired the creation of Peter Pan in the BBC docudrama The Lost Boys (1978). Other television roles included two episodes of the BBC's Play for Today, as Norah Palmer in the James MacTaggart-directed Robin Redbreast (1970), a Christmas supernatural thriller by John Bowen and Dennis Potter's play Schmoedipus (1974).

She appeared in The Jewel in the Crown (1984) and featured in Anna of the Five Towns (1985) a 4-part BBC period drama. Her last television credit is for an episode of Midsomer Murders entitled "Death's Shadow" (1999).

== Personal life and death ==
Cropper married Coronation Street actor William Roache in 1961. They had two children, son Linus Roache and daughter Vanya. They divorced in 1974.

Cropper died of a heart attack in January 2007, aged 68, at her home in Tangmere, West Sussex.

== Television ==
Year	Title	Role	Notes
1960	Probation Officer	Various	3 episodes
1960–62	BBC Sunday-Night Play	Chrysalis/Lucy	2 episodes
1961	Deadline Midnight	Beth Gibson	Episode: "Doggo"
1961	Harpers West One	Yvonne Seymour	1 episode
1961–66	Emergency Ward 10	Eileen Burton/April Sands	7 episodes
1962	Coronation Street	Joan Akers	4 episodes
1962	No Hiding Place	Terry	Episode: "The Front Man"
1963	The Odd Man trilogy	Ruth Jenkins	10 episodes
1963	First Night	Elsa	Episode: "Funny Noises with Their Mouths"
1965	Sherlock Holmes	Mrs. St. Clair	Episode: "The Man with the Twisted Lip"
1965	The Troubleshooters	Pat	Episode: "Meet Miss Mogul"
1966	The Spies	Jane Patrick	Episode: "Go Ahead, I Only Live Here"
1966	Redcap	Penny Amis	Episode: "An Ambush Among Friends"
1967	Angel Pavement	Miss Cadham	3 episodes
1967	The Wednesday Play	Kate Winter	Episode: In Two Minds
1967	Dr. Finlay's Casebook	Fiona Hadley	Episode: "Criss-Cross"
1967	City '68	Carol	Episode: "Son of the City"
1968–81	ITV Playhouse	Jean Clavering/Marjorie Mansion	2 episodes
1970	Z-Cars	Helen Carter	Episode: "Eleanor Rigby Slept Here"
1970–74	Play for Today	Norah Palmer/Elizabeth Carter	2 episodes, including Robin Redbreast
1971	Take Three Girls	Ida	2 episodes
1971	Thirty-Minute Theatre	Lynda	Episode: "Gun Play"
1971–74	Armchair Theatre	Olga/Joanna	2 episodes
1972	Mistress of Hardwick	Lady Arbella Stuart	5 episodes
1972	The Moonstone	Rosanna Spearman	4 episodes
1972	Dead of Night	Rachel	Episode: "The Exorcism"
1972–75	Softly, Softly: Task Force	Pat Nolan/Barbra Broszac	2 episodes
1973	Spy Trap	Penny Chance	Episode: "A Hero's Return"
1973	Lord Peter Wimsey	Ann Dorland	4 episodes: "The Unpleasantness at the Bellona Club", Dorothy L. Sayers novel, adapted by Anthony Steven and John Bowen
1974	Rooms	Monica Webster	Episode: "Monica"
1976	Emmerdale Farm	Nan Wheeler	6 episodes
1977	1990	Susie Carter	Episode: "Whatever Happened to Cardinal Wolsey"
1978	The Lost Boys	Mary Hodgson	Miniseries
1978–79	Crown Court	Celia Harker	2 serials
1979	Shoestring	Jean Hansford	Episode: "Higher Ground"
1980	The Two Ronnies	Brian	1 episode
1980–82	BBC2 Playhouse	Marge/Babs	2 episodes
1981–82	Nanny	Antonia Rudd	5 episodes
1982	Praying Mantis	Gertrude	TV film
1982	Jackanory Playhouse	Queen Beatrice	Episode: "The Princess and the Inventor"
1984	The Jewel in the Crown	Nicky Paynton	5 episodes
1985	Anna of the Five Towns	Mrs. Sutton	Miniseries
1986	Call Me Mister	Grace Blair	Episode: "The Creative Accountant"
1986	Natural World	Maggie Corbertt	Episode: "Man-Eaters of India"
1987	Miss Marple	Anthea Bradbury-Scott	Episode: Nemesis
1987	Worlds Beyond	Mrs. Leonard	Episode: "Undying Love"
1989–92	Woof!	Joyce	2 episodes
1990	Chancer	Mrs. MacIver	Episode: "Wreckage"
1990	Omnibus	Mother	Episode: "Van Gogh"
1990	Boon	Beth Benson	Episode: "Bully Boys"
1991	Van der Valk	Julie Meijers	Episode: "The Little Rascals"
1991	The Ruth Rendell Mysteries	Irene Kershaw	Episode: "A New Lease of Death"
1991	Casualty	Mrs. Chassne	Episode: "Facing Up"
1992	Moon and Son	Mrs. Denmark	Episode: "Past, Present and Future"
1992	The Bill	Mrs. Matthews	Episode: "Going Soft"
1992	The Old Devils	Gwen Cellan	Miniseries
1992–94	Screen Two	Mrs. Mofrey/Mrs. Mortimer	2 episodes
1993	Agatha Christie's Poirot	Lady Willard	Episode: "The Adventure of the Egyptian Tomb"
1993	Alleyn Mysteries	Violet Duffy	Episode: "Death at the Bar"
1993	Harry	Mrs. Faber	1 episode
1993	Heartbeat	Helen Lessor	Episode: "Going Home"
1993	If You See God, Tell Him	Avis	1 episode
1995	Everyman	Helen Bamber	Special: "Prisoners in Time"
1995	Castles	Margaret Castle	Miniseries
1996	September	Edie	TV movie
1997	Kavanagh QC	Marian Beck	Episode: "Ancient History"
1999	Midsomer Murders	Claire Williams	Episode: "Death's Shadow"

== Filmography ==
Year	Title	Role	Notes
1968	All Neat in Black Stockings	Sis	
1970	Cromwell	Ruth Carter	
1986	Nanou	Nanou's mother	
1994	Don't Get Me Started	Mother	Voice, Uncredited
