= Brian Clark (writer) =

British playwright and television writer (1932–2021)

- Born: 3 June 1932; Bournemouth, England
- Died: 16 November 2021 (aged 89)
- Education: Central School of Speech and Drama; University of Nottingham
- Occupations: Playwright, screenwriter
- Writing career
- Period: 1970–2021
- Notable awards: Society of West End Theatre Award (1978)

Brian Robert Clark (3 June 1932 – 16 November 2021) was a British playwright and screenwriter, best known for his play Whose Life Is It Anyway?, which he later adapted for cinema.

== Early life and education ==
Clark was born on 3 June 1932 in Bristol, United Kingdom, the son of a blacksmith.

He attended Bristol Grammar School, leaving at 16. Clark was educated at the University of Nottingham.

== Career ==
Clark taught in schools, colleges and universities and was a member of the Drama Department at the University of Hull from 1968 to 1972.

In 1970, he sold a television play, Rubber?. Some years after its television production, he adapted the script for the stage. The reworked version won a Society of West End Theaters Award in 1978. Later that year, he brought the play to the United States, first at the Folger in Washington, D.C., followed by its Broadway debut the following year.

In 1972, his script Whose Life is it Anyway?, exploring the theme of assisted suicide, was produced on TV for ITV Saturday Night Theatre. Clark subsequently adapted the play for the stage – in which form it ran in London and on Broadway – then into a film of the same name, which was released in 1981. He wrote other television plays, including Easy Go, Operation Magic Carpet, The Saturday Party, and The Country Party. He wrote the first episode of All Creatures Great and Small (1978). His television series Telford's Change (1979) concerns an international banker downshifting to the job of bank branch manager, the central role being performed by Peter Barkworth.

Clark also wrote Group Theatre, published in 1971 by Theatre Arts Books, in which he summarised the group theatre movement and outlined three approaches to group theatre. He was also the founder of Amber Press Publishers.

His 1979 play Can You Hear Me at the Back?, is centred on a middle-aged architect, who realises that his life has become unfulfilling, both personally and professionally. Prolific English actor Michael Maloney made his West End debut in this play.

== Death ==
Clark lived in Brighton with his second wife, a writer and therapist, in later life. He died from an aortic aneurysm on 16 November 2021, at the age of 89.

== Awards and nominations ==
- 1978 Society of West End Theatres Award for Whose Life Is It Anyway?
- 1979 Selection, The Burns Mantle Theatre Yearbook, The Best Plays of 1978–1979 for Whose Life Is It Anyway?
- 1979 Tony Award nominee, Best Play for Whose Life Is It Anyway?
- 1985 Elected Fellow of the Royal Society of Literature
