= James Bate (actor) =

English actor

- Born: Anthony Bate; 10 April 1945; Leeds, England
- Died: 19 May 1992 (aged 47); Fulham, London, England
- Occupation: Actor
- Years active: 1972–1992

Anthony Bate, known professionally as James Bate (10 April 1945 – 19 May 1992), was a British television, film and stage actor.

== Early life ==
When he was three, Bate's family moved to Whitley Bay. His first venture came aged 13 when he started singing an accompanying himself on the guitar. Aged 17, Tony (as he was known) became an excellent guitarist and leader of a well-respected local beat group, "The Strangers" who expanded with the addition of a singer into "The Sixteen Strings" and made a record before disbanding when Anthony [Tony] left for college. During this time, they performed cabaret, inserting more comedy into the act and performing in clubs. In between this, Tony also had a number of other jobs including working as a van driver, labourer and fitter of artificial limbs.

Moving to London, Tony sang in pubs and took whatever job he could find such as being an MC. After trying amateur theatre with the Chelsea Players, he gave up music, swapping it for acting, taking a two-year drama course at the Mount View Theatre School in Hornsey. This led to him playing Hamlet and Romeo on the campus and in a two-month tour of the United States arranged by the school. Upon returning home, the actor joined the Tyneside Theatre Company.

== Career ==
As a result of there already being an actor named Anthony Bate, he chose James Bate as his professional name.

On TV, he made major appearances as Corporal Ernest Bright in six episodes of The Regiment (1973) and Sammy Fenwick in the television miniseries The Stars Look Down (1975). He guested in various television shows including ITV Playhouse, Thriller (1 episode, 1974), When the Boat Comes In, Amyand in the Doctor Who serial "Planet of Fire" (1984) and Malcolm Hallwood in Auf Wiedersehen, Pet (1986). Bate's final screen role was as Stonker in one episode of Spender opposite Jimmy Nail.

== Death ==
James died in London's Charing Cross Hospital after suffering a massive haemorrhage. He is buried in Whitley Bay Cemetery.
