= Kessler (TV series) =

Television series

- Cover of the DVD release.
- Created by: John Brason; Gerard Glaister
- Starring: Clifford Rose; Alan Dobie; Nitza Saul; Alison Glennie; Nicholas Young; Bernard Hepton; Robert Morris; John Moreno; Ralph Michael; Oscar Quitak
- Country of origin: United Kingdom
- Original language: English
- No. of series: 1
- No. of episodes: 6

Production
- Running time: 50 minutes

Original release
- Network: BBC1
- Release: 13 November – 18 December 1981

Kessler is a television series produced by the BBC in 1981, starring Clifford Rose in the title role. The six-part serial is a sequel to the Second World War drama series Secret Army, set in contemporary times.

== Plot ==
The story begins when a Belgian journalist, Hugo van Eyck, broadcasts a documentary about Nazi war criminals, and investigates the whereabouts of the former Chief of Gestapo and SS of Belgium, Standartenführer Kessler (who had been promoted from Sturmbannführer during the final series of preceding drama Secret Army, set during the war, over 30 years before). Van Eyck has a high media profile in Belgium and soon develops an investigation into Kessler with the help of West German intelligence officer Richard Bauer.

Kessler has changed his name to Manfred Dorf and is now a rich industrialist, with factories manufacturing plastics, explosives, and pharmaceutical products. His wartime Belgian mistress Madeleine Duclos is deceased, but after the war the couple married and had a daughter, Ingrid. Kessler is part of an organisation called the Kameradenwerk, made up of Nazis on the run, trying to evade trial for their war crimes, led by Kessler's close friend Colonel Hans Ruckert, a character based on Luftwaffe ace Colonel Hans Rudel.

It is essential to the drama that the Kameradenwerk are not merely passive, intermittently stalked figures. They loosely resemble an aged Fourth Reich, compelled with the idea of an anticipated ascendancy of the German state and Volk, a foreseen future referred to as Der Tag (literally 'The Day'). Mostly made up of aging, World War II Nazi veterans, the organisation is large, endowed and very dangerous in the drama to those who cross them or who try to make their existence known publicly. The potential of the Kamaradenwerk is meant to be perceived as formidable and frightening by the audience.

The Kameradenwerk is active in Germany and Europe, keeping a huge sum of Nazi loot funds, furthered by the financial successes of Kessler. The secret, highly regimented organisation is based in countries throughout Latin America, headed by actual, named war criminals from the Second World War, who in the drama are of higher rank than Standartenführer Kessler. This important element of the plot echoes a reality of postwar Nazis who fled Europe through Ratlines to the continent. Kessler, or Dorf, whilst he is lower down in the organisation, does however hold joint control with the Kamaradenwerk leader of the vast organisation funds.

Ingrid is sleeping with her father's manservant, Franz Hoss, and they are part of a group of young Neo-Nazis who dream of leading Germany back to Nazism.

In Brussels, van Eyck invites three of the prominent Lifeline (a Second World War escape line) partners, who were Secret Army series characters, to his television studios: Albert Foiret, Monique Durnford (née Duchamps), and Natalie Chantrens. Some of the serial's first scenes take place outside the Restaurant Candide in the Grand-Place in Brussels. The trio reminisce about their wartime activities running the resistance organisation Lifeline.

Monique and Natalie are certain that Dorf is Kessler, but Albert claims to be less sure, seemingly unconvinced of the purpose in awakening decades-old sleeping dogs.

Van Eyck and Bauer meet a young Israeli woman soldier called Mical Rak. Mical's mother's family was sent to Dachau to be killed, on Kessler's orders.

Mical breaks into the grounds of Kessler's home to see him, but is discovered and forced to flee. The Kameradenwerk discover where she is staying and very soon murder her companion Ruth Lieberman. Abruptly, media celebrity Van Eyck becomes their next victim as Mical's visit has threatened Kessler and the Kameradenwerk. They fear she works for either the Israeli state or Nazi hunting groups. It is agreed Kessler should leave, going first to the countryside (where Mical follows equipped with a gun) and then to London for a business conference.

When Mical follows to London she is identified and kidnapped from outside Kessler's London hotel and beaten by Franz, before being thrown into the River Thames. However, she survives and is rescued by the authorities. Mical and Bauer, who is also now in London, team up to target Kessler.

Back on the continent, Bauer's companion intelligence agent in Belgium, Karl Leider, pays an official visit to Kessler's home while Kessler is away, finding a photo album proving Dorf is indeed Kessler. While he is inside, Kameradenwerk agents interfere with Agent Leider's car. They follow him on the road when he leaves and subsequently murder him on a quiet stretch of road. Just before, Leider had stopped for fuel at a station and used a postbox there.

When the interference is realised and it is known the incriminating photo album was seen, Kessler, Ruckert, Franz and Ingrid travel to Paraguay, and Bauer and Mical set off in pursuit. After a brief detour in Buenos Aires, the pair arrive in Asunción, Paraguay.

Kessler and Ruckert stay with a Nazi-sympathising Paraguayan aristocrat, Don Julian Yqueras. Yqueras is —allegedly— partly based on the former President of Argentina Juan Perón, a Nazi sympathiser who welcomed war criminals into his country and prevented their extradition, and partly on President of Paraguay Alfredo Stroessner - still in power in 1981 - who also allowed his country to become a safe haven for Nazi war criminals. Mical and Bauer stay with pigeon-fancier Jose Garriga, who quickly charms them and wins their friendship.

Ingrid and Franz meet fellow Nazis and discuss a plan to convince Kessler to take over their group and to bring with him a fund of 48 billion Deutschmarks, to be used to support the exiled Nazis. Kessler and Ruckert also meet their comrades, under the command of Martin Bormann, who does not appear on screen, apart from one arm. At the same meeting, Kessler is repulsed to be introduced to Josef Mengele, Auschwitz's "Angel of Death". (In real life, it has been mostly accepted Bormann had died in 1945, but this was not revealed until 1998. Similarly, it is understood Mengele had died in 1979 under the assumed name Wolfgang Gerhard, but this did not come to light until 1985.)

Kessler realises that the Kameradenwerk are just too old and too tired to lead Germany back to Nazism. They care much about their own safety, little about building a new Nazi regime in Germany. After much soul-searching, Kessler decides to turn his back on them and turns instead to the young Nazis, agreeing to give them the Nazi fortune.

Deciding that Mical has become too much of a threat, Ruckert orders his followers to kill her. Unaware of that order for Mical's murder, Ingrid and Franz go after her for the same reason. After killing Garriga, the assassins mistake Ingrid for Mical and Franz for Bauer and shoot both dead, thereby killing the only people who could have resurrected Nazism in the drama.

Mical and Bauer find their bodies and proceed to blow up the Nazi convoys, but Ruckert escapes. Mical and Bauer corner Kessler. After a discussion about the Holocaust and Communism, Bauer informs Kessler of Ingrid's death.

Mical tries to execute Kessler by shooting him in the back of the head but finds that she cannot do it. Mical and Bauer leave him alone, Bauer deliberately leaving his machine gun behind. Realising that his dream of a new Nazi dawn is over, and having lost the one thing (their daughter Ingrid) that he had left of Madeleine, Kessler shoots himself in the mouth using Bauer's machine gun. Mical and Bauer return to find Kessler dead and draped in the Nazi flag. Mical and Bauer finally leave knowing that the Nazis now will never get their hands on the billions, marking the virtual end of the Kamaradenwerk and also ending a chance for the Nazis to return to power.

== Cast ==
- Ludwig Kessler - Clifford Rose
- Richard Bauer - Alan Dobie
- Mical Rak - Nitza Saul
- Ingrid Dorf - Alison Glennie
- Franz Hoss - Nicholas Young
- Colonel Hans Ruckert - Ralph Michael
- Albert Foiret - Bernard Hepton
- Monique Durnford - Angela Richards
- Natalie Chantrens - Juliet Hammond-Hill
- Don Julian Yqueras - Guy Rolfe
- Josef Mengele - Oscar Quitak
- Hugo van Eyck - Jerome Willis
- Jose Garriga - John Moreno
- Karl Leider - Robert Morris
- Gidney - Jeremy Wilkin
- Deakin - Harold Innocent
- Maurer - Royston Tickner
- Graun - John Dearth
- Ruth Lieberman - Ishia Bennison
- Heinrich Himmler - Robert Eddison
- Muller - Gareth Milne

Many former Secret Army production personnel were involved with Kessler, including producer Gerard Glaister, writer John Brason and directors Michael E. Briant and Tristan de Vere Cole.

== Home media ==
Kessler was released on DVD (Region 2, UK) in 2005 by DD Home Entertainment, who had previously released the complete series of Secret Army as broadcast.
