= Telford's Change =

1979 television series

- Written by: Brian Clark
- Directed by: Barry Davis
- Starring: Peter Barkworth; Hannah Gordon
- Theme music composer: John Dankworth
- Country of origin: United Kingdom
- No. of series: 1
- No. of episodes: 10

Production
- Producer: Mark Shivas
- Running time: 50 minutes

Original release
- Network: BBC1
- Release: 7 January – 11 March 1979

Telford's Change is a 1979 BBC television series by Brian Clark which stars Peter Barkworth. The theme music was composed and played by jazz composer John Dankworth. The theme tune was released by BBC Records, (Resl 63), backed with 'Serenade for Sylvia'. The book was released as a Corgi imprint (Transworld Publishers).

== Outline ==
Barkworth plays a bank manager, Mark Telford, who takes a backward step in his career in order to retreat from the rat race. He relinquishes his job in international banking and becomes a local branch manager in Dover.

Telford's wife Sylvia (played by Hannah Gordon) and son Peter (Michael Maloney) remain in London. Keith Barron plays Tim Hart, Sylvia's theatrical colleague who is keen to have an affair with her, and with whom she does have a brief liaison. In order to win back his wife, Telford gives up the Dover job and returns to international banking.

The series was created and sold to the BBC by Barkworth himself and a group of colleagues (including Mark Shivas) through a company called Astramead.

Telford's Change consisted of only one series of ten episodes.
