= Dead of Night (TV series) =

British television anthology series

- Genre: Thriller / Horror
- Country of origin: United Kingdom
- Original language: English
- No. of series: 1
- No. of episodes: 7 (4 missing)

Production
- Producer: Innes Lloyd
- Running time: 50 mins

Original release
- Network: BBC2
- Release: 5 November – 17 December 1972

Dead of Night is a British television anthology series of supernatural fiction, produced by the BBC and broadcast on BBC2 in 1972 over seven 50-minute episodes.

== History ==
Dead of Night is considered by some to be a spiritual successor to an earlier horror anthology by the BBC, Late Night Horror. Like Late Night Horror, Dead of Night ran for a single series in the autumn of 1972.

Only the first, second and seventh episodes – "The Exorcism", "Return Flight", and "A Woman Sobbing" – are retained on their original 625-line PAL colour videotapes in the BBC Archives. The videotapes of "Bedtime", "Death Cancels All Debts", "Smith" and "Two in the Morning" were either erased for reuse or junked during the mid 1970s, and not even any 16mm black-and-white film telerecordings — made for overseas sales to countries not yet broadcasting in colour — are known to exist.

Another programme made by the Dead of Night production team under Innes Lloyd, The Stone Tape, running to 90 minutes and intended to be the eighth episode, also survives in the BBC Archives, but this was broadcast as a stand-alone story and not shown under the Dead of Night banner.

BBC Four rebroadcast "The Exorcism" on 22 December 2007.

The three surviving episodes of Dead of Night were released on DVD by the BFI in October 2013, with extras including a gallery of stills from the four missing episodes, the downloadable scripts for all episodes (surviving and missing); and a booklet featuring essays and biographies by Lisa Kerrigan, Oliver Wake, Derek Johnston and Alex Davidson.

== Cast ==
"The Exorcism"

- Anna Cropper: Rachel
- Sylvia Kay: Margaret
- Edward Petherbridge: Edmund
- Clive Swift: Dan
- Kenneth Kendall: Newsreader

"Return Flight"

- Peter Barkworth: Captain Rolph
- Bernard Brown: Frank Warley
- Artro Morris: Samuels
- Diana Fairfax: Rosalind Warley
- Denis Lill: Froggat
- Anthony Dutton: Armstrong
- Karin MacCarthy: Zoe
- Barrie Fletcher: Arthur Shaw
- Christopher Denham: Radar controller
- Laurie Asprey: Ground controller
- Roger Avon: Police Inspector
- Candida Fawsitt: Linda
- Carl Bohen: Ernst
- Paul Bentley: Franz
- Hannah Kilpinen: Hilde

"Bedtime"

- Sarah Badel: Lorna
- Terrence Hardiman: Piers Wickett
- Sidney Johnson: Antique dealer
- Jacqueline Pearce: Sarah Hopkirk
- James Smillie: Keith Hopkirk
- Neil Stacy: Geoffrey Hamilton
- Yutte Stensgaard: Gertrud Wickett

"Death Cancels All Debts"

- David Baron: James Halt
- Lucy Griffiths: Florence
- Charles Lamb: Clockmender
- Graham Leaman: Mr. Simon
- Doris Littlewood: Mrs. Walter
- Frank Littlewood: Mr. Walter
- Preston Lockwood: Mr. Denfield
- Sebastian Shaw: Powys Jubb
- Gladys Spencer: Mrs. Simon
- Nora Swinburne: Mariella Jubb
- Marjorie Wilde: Mrs. Denfield
- Katya Wyeth: Vanessa

"Smith"

- John Castle: Michael
- Christopher Hancock: Features editor
- Ruby Head: Mrs. Hunter
- Gwen Taylor: Tessa
- Stacey Tendeter: Anne
- John Gabriel: Scrutton
- Madi Head: Miss Blatch
- Gerald Cross, Denis McCarthy: Voices
- Peter Gilmore: (role unknown)
- Jason Fithian: Major Smith

"Two in the Morning"

- Donald Douglas: Hazelhurst
- John Gregg: Partner
- Frederick Hall: Manager
- Peter Jeffrey: Wisbech
- John Nettleton: Grandman
- Ralph Nossek: Dr. Fortescue
- Andrea Allan: New secretary
- Vivienne Cohen, Pam Scotcher: Girls on bus
- Richard Dennis: Lofthouse
- Carrie Jones: Roberta
- Lois Kentish: Tea girl
- Annabelle Lee: Cashier
- Vivienne Martin: Jessie
- Judy Matheson: Tessa
- David Sinclair: Art teacher
- Bernice Spivack: Miss Levy
- Marianne Stone: Mrs. Firth
- Pauline Stroud: Mary

"A Woman Sobbing"

- Anna Massey: Jane Pullar
- Ronald Hines: Frank Pullar
- Julian Holloway: Sandy
- Yokki Rhodes: Inge
- Tommy Boyle: Gas fitter
- John Lee: Priest
- Margaret John: Fay
- John Graham: Philip
- David Whitworth, Jan Edwards: In the church hall
- Denis Gilmore: Fitter's mate
- Donna Reading: Secretary
- Elaine Elder: Dutch au pair
- Nicky Cox: Robin
- Craig McFarlane: James

== Episodes ==
No.	Title	Directed by	Written by	Original release date
1	"The Exorcism"	Don Taylor	Don Taylor	5 November 1972
Rachel and Edmund have just bought a new cottage, and invite their friends Dan and Margaret down for Christmas dinner. But suddenly, strange things start to happen: there's a power cut and the phone goes dead; the wine tastes of blood, and the turkey makes them violently ill; and then the four discover they are trapped in the cottage with no way out. Then, Margaret becomes possessed by the vengeful spirit of the cottage's previous occupier, a woman from the Middle Ages named Sarah Jane, who tells the other three the tragic story of the events leading to her and her family's deaths; and how, on her deathbed, vowed justice for what happened... Archive status: exists
2	"Return Flight"	Rodney Bennett	Robert Holmes	12 November 1972
Readjusting to work shortly after the death of his wife, Captain Hamish Rolph is a man who has lost his bearings, which is an exceptionally dangerous problem in his profession. Archive status: exists
3	"Bedtime"	Simon Langton	Hugh Whitemore	19 November 1972
Lorna, a young woman who feels trapped in her new marriage to Geoffrey, becomes so enamoured with a newly purchased antique Victorian brass bedstead that she begins to spend all her time sleeping in the bed — and slowly becomes imprisoned by it... Archive status: missing
4	"Death Cancels All Debts"	Brian Farnham	Peter Draper	26 November 1972
Powys Jubb, a world famous writer, wakes up at 4:20 a.m. every morning when his clock stops ticking, and soon becomes convinced that some day he will die at this exact time. Archive status: missing
5	"Smith"	Robert Knights	Dorothy Allison	3 December 1972
When Jane Hornby, a journalist, decides to do a story on the serial killer George Joseph Smith, whose 'Brides in the Bath' murders horrified and appalled the England of his time, she discovers that the past is living on in the present. Archive status: missing
6	"Two in the Morning"	Paul Annett	Leo Lehmann	10 December 1972
A depressed man named Wisbech is alarmed when his doppelganger appears and begins to take over his life. Archive status: missing
7	"A Woman Sobbing"	Paul Ciappessoni	John Bowen	17 December 1972
Jane and Frank are in an increasingly strained marriage. One night, Jane hears a woman crying in the attic, though Frank hears nothing; and her attempts to discover the truth cause her to become increasingly paranoid. Archive status: exists
