= Alison Glennie =

British actress (born 1958)

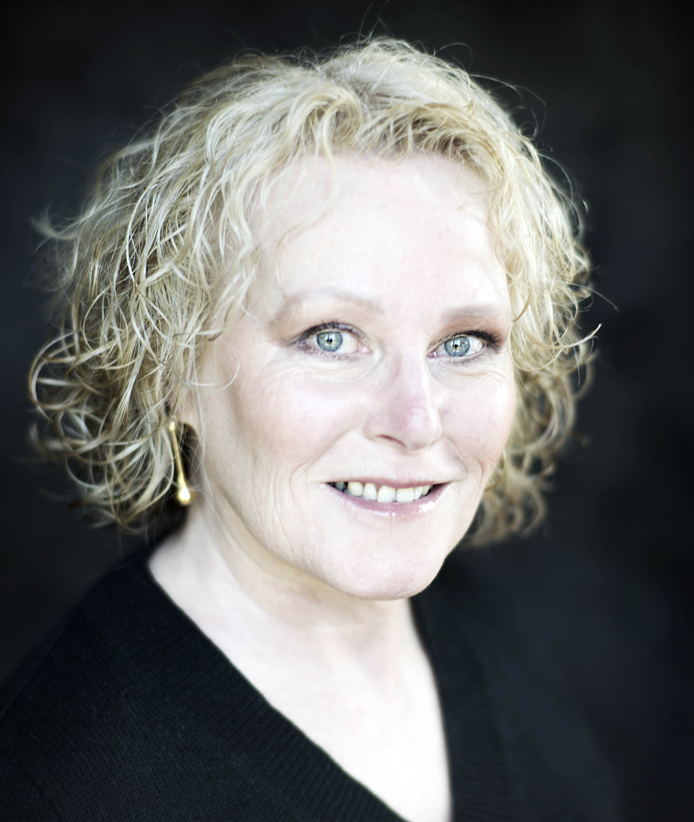
- Born: 9 March 1958 (age 68); Hastings, UK
- Years active: 1966–present

Alison Glennie (born 9 March 1958) is a British actress. She played Ingrid Dorf in the BBC thriller serial Kessler, and appeared in Z-Cars, Blake's 7 and A Little Princess (all for the BBC), Thriller and Horse in the House (ITV).

Glennie played Gertrude in Hamlet at the Cork Opera House. She regularly reads The Book on One on RTÉ Radio 1. Glennie's films include Escape from the Sea (Children's Film Foundation) and The Bunker (TimeLife).

Glennie has produced and directed several short films, which have been screened at film festivals. Exploring digital media as an advocacy tool, she devised and directed an improvised short film called On the Pig's Back at the Cope Foundation. The film is a comedy heist and features a cast of actors with intellectual disability (ID).

As a performance artist, she was invited by artist John Kelly to create a site-specific performance that honoured the ancestors and spirit of place while referencing Kelly's artworks. The live performance was experienced by audiences at Reen Farm, a townland once ravaged by An Gorta Mor. It is located near Skibbereen in West Cork, Ireland. Simultaneous with the theatrical event, Glennie produced a short film to document the event, which screened at film festivals. Point of Departure: A Lament was included in the programme of events for Coming Home: Art and The Great Hunger shown at Uillinn: West Cork Arts Centre in 2018.

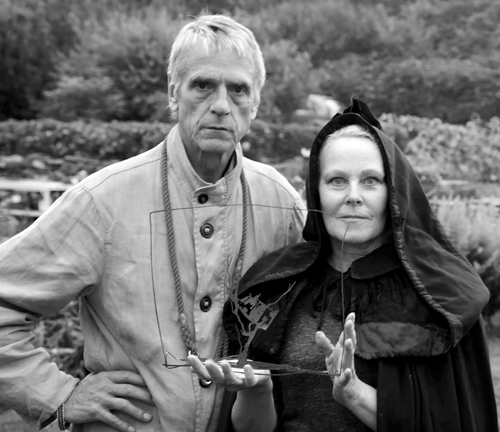
Alison Glennie and Jeremy Irons attending a festival event at Reen Farm Sculpture Garden

== Other work ==
Glennie facilitates drama workshops for children at Uillinn: West Cork Art Centre in Skibbereen, West Cork, Ireland.
