= Whose Life Is It Anyway? (film) =

1981 film by John Badham

- Theatrical release poster by Tom Jung
- Directed by: John Badham
- Written by: Brian Clark (play, screenplay); Reginald Rose (screenplay)
- Produced by: Lawrence P. Bachman
- Starring: Richard Dreyfuss; John Cassavetes; Christine Lahti; Bob Balaban
- Cinematography: Mario Tosi
- Edited by: Frank Morriss
- Music by: Arthur B. Rubinstein
- Production company: Metro-Goldwyn-Mayer
- Distributed by: United Artists (United States/Canada); Cinema International Corporation (International)
- Release date: December 2, 1981
- Running time: 119 minutes
- Country: United States
- Language: English
- Budget: $11.5 million
- Box office: $6.1 million

Whose Life Is It Anyway? is a 1981 American drama film directed by John Badham and starring Richard Dreyfuss. It was adapted by Brian Clark and Reginald Rose from Clark's 1972 television movie and 1978 stage play, all under the same title. Whose Life Is It Anyway? received a 70% fresh rating on Rotten Tomatoes, based on 10 reviews and an average rating of 6.58/10.

== Plot ==
Boston-based sculptor Ken Harrison becomes paralyzed from the neck down after a car accident. He is no longer able to use his hands, create art, walk, feed himself, make love, or have any semblance of a normal existence. Because he can no longer pursue any of his passions, and because he will likely need medical help forever, he wants to end his life. However, he is physically unable to commit suicide, so he looks to end his life in other ways—all of which would require his discharge from the hospital. He asks for this from Dr. Emerson, the hospital administrator, and he refuses; Emerson is staunchly opposed to euthanasia, and is determined to keep his patient alive—even against his wishes.

He dumps his girlfriend, Pat, who is initially distraught, but eventually accepts that their relationship could not realistically continue, and accepts his decision to end his life.

Harrison hires Carter Hill, a lawyer who is at first reluctant to represent him, but eventually does so. Harrison legally petitions the hospital for the right to end his life.

Claire Scott, Harrison's sympathetic physician, eventually develops personal feelings for Harrison and wants to keep him alive.

A young male orderly and a young female nurse at the hospital do what they can to keep Harrison's spirits up—even wheeling him to the hospital basement in the wee hours of the night, where they treat him to a live reggae concert and marijuana.

A legal hearing is eventually convened where Harrison presents his arguments to a judge on his right to die. After researching a previous similar case, the judge ultimately sides with Harrison and affirms it is his right to decide what to do with his own life.

Later in the hospital, Claire readies Ken for death in his bed. She attempts to kiss him, but he turns his head stating it would be too hard to admit their feelings now. Claire leaves the room and closes his shade, leaving him to pass away on his own terms.

== Cast ==
- Richard Dreyfuss as Ken Harrison
- John Cassavetes as Dr. Emerson
- Christine Lahti as Claire Scott
- Bob Balaban as Carter Hill
- Thomas Carter as John
- Kaki Hunter as Mary Jo
- Kenneth McMillan as Judge Wyler
- Janet Eilber as Pat

== Production ==
The film was produced by Lawrence Bachmann formerly the head of MGM British.
