= John Moreno =

British actor (born 1939)

- Born: 4 March 1939 (age 87); France
- Other name: Juan Moreno
- Occupation: Actor
- Years active: 1957–2004

John Moreno (born 4 March 1939) is a retired British actor, probably best known for his role as Luigi Ferrara in the 1981 James Bond feature film For Your Eyes Only.

== Early life ==
Moreno was born to a Spanish father and French mother. Brought to England at the age of two months, he spent most of his childhood travelling the world in a circus due to his father, Jose Moreno, being a famous juggler. During this time, he was taught various skills including juggling, tumbling and bareback riding.

Aged 17, Moreno formed a nightclub act with his sister and they were engaged to appear in France. Upon arriving in Marseilles, he was arrested as a draft dodger for not reporting for National service. While his sister went to Spain to become an actress, Moreno was court-martialled but acquitted. Finding himself enrolled in the French Army during the Algerian War, he learnt the art of mime from a fellow soldier. After leaving the army, he turned to a career in straight acting.

== Career ==
His other film credits include appearances in Les Misérables (1978), The Razor's Edge (1984), John Wycliffe: The Morning Star (1984) and Old Scores (1991). His television credits include Doctor Who (in the serial The Ambassadors of Death where he played Dobson), Moonbase 3, The Duchess of Duke Street, Return of the Saint, Thriller, The Sweeney, The Enigma Files, Kessler, Farrington of the F.O., Squadron, Only Fools and Horses, Dempsey and Makepeace, Beau Geste, One by One, Lovejoy and Heartbeat. He had a recurring role in the 1971 television series Hine.

Having learnt so many talents from a young age, Moreno was able to apply these to the various roles he played. In addition, he worked as a stage fight director, arranging fights for theatre productions, as well as holding workshops for youngsters to learn about the craft.

== Selected filmography ==
=== Film ===
| Year | Title | Role | Notes |
|---|---|---|---|
| 1962 | Cupido contrabandista | | Credited as Juan Moreno |
| 1981 | For Your Eyes Only | Luigi Ferrara | |
| 1984 | The Razor's Edge | French Detective #1 | |
| 1984 | John Wycliffe: The Morning Star | Benedictine Monk | |
| 1991 | Old Scores | Referee | |

=== Television ===
| Year | Title | Role | Notes |
|---|---|---|---|
| 1957 | Nathaniel Titlark | Villager | Episode: "O Woodman, Spare That Tree" |
| 1968 | The Troubleshooters | Carlow (as Juan Moreno) | Episode: "Not for My Friend, He's Driving" |
| 1968 | Virgin of the Secret Service | Helmut | Episode: "Entente Cordiale" |
| 1968 | Triton | French Lieutenant | Episode: "Lamb to the Slaughter" |
| 1968 | Crime Buster | French cafe customer (as Juan Moreno) | Episode: "The Third Thief" |
| 1970 | Doctor Who | Dobson (as Juan Moreno) | Episode: "The Ambassadors of Death: Episode 2" |
| 1971 | Hine | Frank the Chauffeur | 7 episodes |
| 1972 | Spyder's Web | Emil (as Juan Moreno) | Episode: "The Prevalence of Skeletons" |
| 1972 | Pretenders | Soft John | 4 episodes |
| 1973 | Moonbase 3 | Juan Benavente | 2 episodes |
| 1973 | Crown Court | Grigori Petrov | 2 episodes |
| 1973–1975 | Thriller | Filton Nick (as Juan Moreno) | 2 episodes |
| 1977 | The Duchess of Duke Street | Gaspard | 2 episodes |
| 1978 | Return of the Saint | Pierre | Episode: "The Imprudent Professor" |
| 1978 | The Sweeney | Doad | Episode: "Hearts and Minds" |
| 1978 | Les Miserables | Cochopaille | Television film |
| 1980 | The Enigma Files | Henry Manton | Episode: "Investigation of a Copper" |
| 1981 | Kessler | Jose Garriga | 3 episodes |
| 1982 | Squadron | Vasquez | Episode: "Deadline" |
| 1982 | Beau Geste | Maris | 3 episodes |
| 1982 | Only Fools and Horses | Enrico | Episode: "Diamonds Are for Heather" |
| 1985 | Dempsey and Makepeace | Reynolds | Episode: "The Squeeze" |
| 1985 | One by One | Dr. Preece | Episode: "Pride of Place" |
| 1985 | Minder | Claude | Episode: "Minder on the Orient Express" |
| 1986–1987 | Farrington of the F.O. | Colonel Alberto Rodrigues | 2 episodes |
| 1991 | The Darling Buds of May | Gabby | Episode: "A Breath of French Air: Part 2" |
| 1992 | Eldorado | Dr. Garcia | 2 episodes |
| 1993 | Lovejoy | Duty Sergeant | Episode: "Pig in a Poke" |
| 1994 | The Bill | Jimmy Wallace | Episode: "Nowhere to Run" |
| 1995–1997 | The Ruth Rendell Mysteries | Stephano Taxi Driver | 2 episodes |
| 1998 | Touching Evil | Paul Salvant | 2 episodes |
| 2004 | Heartbeat | Judge Yardley | Episode: "A Call to Arms" |
