= Nitza Saul =

Israeli-born actress (born 1950)

- ניצה שאול
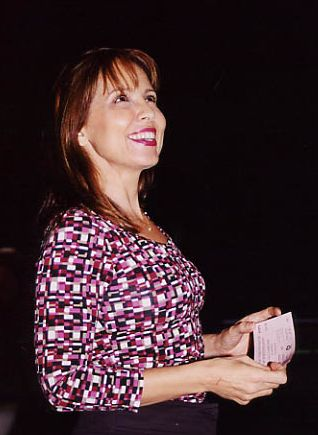
- Born: Nitza Saul; June 25, 1950 (age 76); Tel Aviv, Israel
- Occupation: Actress

Nitza Saul (Hebrew: ניצה שאול; born June 25, 1950, sometimes credited as Nitza Shaul) is an Israeli actress known for her appearances on British television during the 1980s.

She was born in Tel Aviv, to Zipporah (died 2025) and Yitzhak Shaul

In the 1970s Saul starred in several Israeli films, including Giv'at Halfon Eina Ona ("Halfon Hill Doesn't Answer"), Hashoter Azulai ("Officer Azulai") and Hagiga B'Snuker ("Party at the Snooker Hall"). Saul became the first Israeli woman to pose for Playboy magazine in the May 1979 issue.

In 1981, Saul relocated her acting career to work in London, she starred in the thriller mini-series Kessler. One of her notable appearances in British television was in the 1984 Doctor Who serial "Warriors of the Deep" as the unfortunate Karina. She also appeared in C.A.T.S. Eyes, Star Cops, Flash (1987) and EastEnders in 1989. Of her theatre career in Britain, she played opposite Pierce Brosnan, and Keith Baxter in the stage play in The Red Devil Battery Sign.

She subsequently returned to Israel, where she resumed her acting career, appearing on television in soap operas such as Ramat Aviv Gimmel and Florentin. In 2001 she created, wrote and edited a children's play called Sound of Magic, which she continues to perform.

== Personal life ==
Saul was recruited to the IDF in 1968, spent her military service in the IDF musical group, Lehakat Pikud Merkaz (‘the central command band’) where she met future husband, conductor Doron Salomon. Their daughter, Gal Saloman, is also an actress.

== Filmography ==
Film

- The Policeman (1971) as Mimi
- Katz and Carrasso (1971) as Tikva Katz
- Hagiga B'Snuker (1975) as Yona
- Giv'at Halfon Eina Ona (1976) as Yael Hasson
- Little Man (1978) as Sofie
- The Fox in the Chicken Coop (1978) as Goorevitch
- The Vulture (1981) as Yardena
- The Megillah 83 (1983)
- Until September (1984) as Sylvia
- Flash (1987)
- Love in Suspenders (2019) as Tammy

Television

- BBC2 Play of the Week (1978) as Eszter, one episode
- Kessler (1981) as Mical Rak, 6 episodes
- Doctor Who: Warriors of the Deep (1984) as Karina, two episodes
- C.A.T.S. Eyes (1985) as Nikki, one episode
- Star Cops (1987) as Chamsya Assadi, one episodes
- EastEnders (1989) as Ruth, five episodes
- Mindbender (film) as Teacher
- Ramat Aviv Gimmel (1995, 1998) as Sheli Danor, two episodes
- Florentine (1997, 1998) as Hana Shavit, five episodes
- Beikvot Hasipurim Haksumim (1998, 1999) as Yossi's mother, two episodes
- Ugly Esti (2003-2006) as Ika Alfandari
- Elvis, Rosental, VeHaIsha Hamistorit (2005) as Ika Ben David, one episode
- Flight of the Tortoise (2012) as Shosanna
- Shtisel (2013) as Rebetzen Edna Heshin, three episodes
- Bringing the Wind (2014)
- Savri Maranan (2016) as Miryamale, two episodes
- Tzomet Miller (2018) as Hannah, two episodes
- Punch (2019) as Nitza, two episodes
- Zehu Ze! (2020) as Yaeli Hasson, one episode
