= Robin Redbreast (Play for Today) =

- Play for Today episode
- Episode no.: Series 1 Episode 9
- Directed by: James MacTaggart
- Written by: John Griffith Bowen
- Original air date: 10 December 1970

Episode chronology
← Previous "Hearts And Flowers"	Next → "The Hallelujah Handshake"

"Robin Redbreast" is the ninth episode of first season of the British BBC anthology TV series Play for Today. The episode was a television play that was originally broadcast on 10 December 1970. "Robin Redbreast" was written by John Griffith Bowen, directed by James MacTaggart and produced by Graeme MacDonald.

The play is about pagan rural customs and their interaction with modern society.

== Synopsis ==
After she's dumped by her boyfriend, BBC script editor Norah Palmer (Anna Cropper) leaves her friends Jake (Julian Holloway) and Madge (Amanda Walker) in London and moves to the house that she'd bought with her boyfriend in the countryside in southern England. Norah finds the village people strange but endearing, notably Mrs. Vigo (Freda Bamford), a busybody housekeeper; Mr. Fisher (Bernard Hepton), a historian; Mr. Wellbeloved, the butcher; and Peter, an old man who compulsively chops wood. After she discovers an infestation of mice at her house, the villagers suggest she seek out someone named Rob, who they tell her lives in the woods.

Norah finds "Rob," who turns out to be a young, handsome exterminator named Edgar, who spends his spare time practising karate nearly nude in the forest. Edgar successfully clears Norah's house of the mice. Although she finds him personally boring, Norah is nonetheless attracted to him. After an incident in which he kills a bird that someone drops down her chimney, Norah sleeps with him, despite having misplaced her diaphragm.

Soon after, Norah discovers that she's pregnant. She returns home to London for an abortion, but decides against the procedure at the last minute and goes back to the house. As Easter approaches, she discovers that she's slowly being cut off from the outside world; her phone line is cut, her car is tampered with, and the local bus driver refuses to stop for her. Norah begins to believe that she's the victim of a village-wide conspiracy and that the villagers plan to sacrifice her and take her child.

Norah lets Rob into her house, as he seems to be the only person not involved in the conspiracy. While they discuss what's been happening, the villagers converge on the house in a lynch mob. Against her expectations, the villagers leave Norah alone, but Rob is gone, apparently sacrificed.

Mr Fisher explains that the nickname "Rob" came from "Robin" and that "Robin redbreast" is a special totem in the pagan religion of the town. Edgar/Robin was raised from birth by the townspeople with the purpose of becoming a sacrificial lamb. Fisher explains that Norah's child will be the next Robin, and offers to raise the child for her so that she can return to a normal life in London. Norah refuses but is allowed to leave nonetheless. As she departs the village, she turns back for one last look and sees that the townspeople have all transformed into pagan deities led by Fisher as Herne the Hunter.

== Cast ==
- Anna Cropper as Norah Palmer
- Julian Holloway as her friend, Jake
- Amanda Walker as her friend, Madge
- Freda Bamford as Mrs Vigo
- Bernard Hepton as Mr Fisher
- Andrew Bradford as Rob
- Cyril Cross as Peter
- Robin Wentworth as Mr Wellbeloved

== Production notes ==
Like other early episodes of Play for Today, although originally recorded on colour videotape, this programme only survives in the form of a 16mm black and white film recording. Colour recovery was not utilised for the BFI's DVD release of the play.
