= Nanou (film) =

- Directed by: Conny Templeman
- Screenplay by: Conny Templeman; Antoine Lacomblez
- Produced by: Simon Perry; Patrick Sandrin
- Starring: Imogen Stubbs; Jean-Philippe Écoffey; Michel Robin; Daniel Day-Lewis; Roger Ibáñez; Lou Castel
- Cinematography: Martin Fuhrer
- Edited by: Tom Priestley
- Music by: John E. Keane
- Production companies: Umbrella Films; Arion Production
- Release dates: 7 September 1986 (Toronto International Film Festival); 27 February 1987 (United Kingdom)
- Running time: 110 minutes
- Country: France
- Languages: French; Italian; English

Nanou is a 1986 Franco-British feature film directed by Conny Templeman. It stars Imogen Stubbs, Jean-Philippe Écoffey, Michel Robin and Daniel Day-Lewis.

== Plot ==
In the 1970s, a blonde English student, Nanou, spends just a few months on the continent. She tours Switzerland, but prefers France. In Lorraine, she meets Luc, a handsome worker in the militant extreme left-wing, and trains with him in his activities outside the law. She gradually moves into the French village and lives out her activist life on the sidelines until England remembers her ...

== Cast ==
- Imogen Stubbs: Nanou
- Jean-Philippe Écoffey: Luc
- Michel Robin: Mr. Henry
- Daniel Day-Lewis: Max
- Roger Ibáñez: Michel
- Lou Castel: Italian activist
- Christophe Lindon: Charles
- Valentine Pelka: Jacques
- Nathalie Bécue: Chantal
- Dominique Rousseau: Rita
- Anna Cropper: Nanou's mother
- Patrick O'Connell: Nanou's father
- Anne-Marie Jabraud: Ms. Giraud
- Bérangère Jean
- Jean-Marc Morel: Jean
- Jean Amos: Robert
- Tristan Bastite: Léon

== Datasheet ==
- Sets: Andrew Mollo
- Costumes: Agnès Nègre
- Country of Origin: France
- Format: Colour – Mono – 35 mm
- Genre: Comedy

== Critical reception ==
"An almost forgotten treasure from a filmmaker who disappeared from public life, almost without a trace, so is Malick. It is also the best performance of Imogen Stubbs." - Rüdiger Tomczak
