= The Guardians (British TV series) =

1971 British TV thriller series

- The Guardians title card
- Genre: Science fiction Political thriller Drama
- Created by: Rex Firkin; Vincent Tilsley
- Written by: various
- Directed by: various
- Starring: Gwyneth Powell; Cyril Luckham; David Burke; Derek Smith; Edward Petherbridge
- Country of origin: United Kingdom
- Original language: English
- No. of series: 1
- No. of episodes: 13

Production
- Producer: Andrew Brown
- Running time: 60 minutes
- Production company: London Weekend Television

Original release
- Network: ITV
- Release: 10 July – 2 October 1971

The Guardians is a television political thriller series of 13 60-minute episodes made by London Weekend Television and broadcast in the UK on the ITV network (with the exception of Ulster Television) between 10 July 1971 and 2 October 1971.

== Synopsis ==
The Guardians is a dystopian political thriller set in the 1980s. Following economic chaos, democratic government has been overthrown in a bloodless coup, the Royal Family fled into self-imposed exile and England is ruled autocratically by Prime Minister Sir Timothy Hobson. Hobson is initially a pawn of 'the General'; a military officer by the name of Roger, who later becomes the Minister of Defence. Hobson subscribes to an outwardly benevolent paternalistic fascism, based on the principle that "democracy is a form of group suicide." Political opposition is suppressed by a uniformed paramilitary force recruited from former policemen, soldiers and security guards and called "The Guardians of the Realm" (known for short as "The Guardians" or simply "The Gs"). Each episode begins with a column of Guardians marching through central London to a memorable theme tune composed by Wilfred Josephs.

The government, nominally headed by Hobson, is opposed by a fragmented resistance movement collectively named "Quarmby." The dominant group within Quarmby favours a strategy of provoking increased oppression by the state through the use of assassination and other forms of terrorism. The series avoided black and white scenarios by portraying moderate and extreme factions jostling within both government and resistance. Hobson represents the liberal element within government, attempting to outmanoeuvre the seldom-seen General and the polished Cabinet Secretary Norman.

== Cast ==
- Edward Petherbridge as Christopher Hobson
- Derek Smith as Dennis Norman
- John Collin as Tom Weston
- Cyril Luckham as Sir Timothy Hobson
- Lynn Farleigh as Eleanor Benedict
- David Burke as Dr Benedict
- Gwyneth Powell as Clare Weston
- Robin Ellis as Peter Lee
- Robert Morris as Inspector Arnold
- Peter Howell as Geoff Hollis
- Joan Heal as Miss Joan Quarmby
- Dinsdale Landen as Dr Mark Thorn
- Anthony Bate as Raymond Barry
- Graham Crowden as The Dirtiest Man
- Richard Vernon as Dace
- Michael Culver as Paul
- Richard Hurndall as Sir Francis Wainwright
- André Maranne as Felicien de Bastion
- Robert Russell as Gibb
- John Bryans as Bullmore
- John Rhys-Davies as First Guardian
- James Grout as Hobbs
- Peter Barkworth as Quarmby
- Ken Hutchison as Second Guardian
- Windsor Davies as Shop Steward

== Episode list ==
No.	Title	Directed by	Written by	Original release date
1	"The State of England"	Robert Tronson	Vincent Tilsley	10 July 1971
After a period of mass unemployment, chaos and a complete failure of the government, order has been restored in England. However, the price of this new stability is personal liberty. Dissenters soon appear, dedicated to the overthrow of the new regime.
2	"Pursuit"	James Goddard	Hugh Whitemore	17 July 1971
An attempt has been made on the Prime Minister’s life, and an agent planted to root out Communists within the Guardians is shot dead.
3	"Head of State"	Robert Tronson	John Bowen	24 July 1971
A delicate situation develops when the French President, due in London for talks, refuses to attend unless he can meet the real head of state. With the Queen in self-imposed exile and the Prime Minister little more than a pawn of the General, who is the real head of state?
4	"The Logical Approach"	Tony Wharmby	John Bowen	31 July 1971
The new Home Secretary is perturbed to find out that, in a supposedly humane measure, prisoners under sentence of death are sedated and painlessly euthanised 24 hours before their scheduled executions.
5	"Quarmby"	Robert Tronson	John Bowen	7 August 1971
The search continues for a sniper and the Prime Minister has had enough. He decides to disband the Guardians. But does he have the power to do so?
6	"Appearances"	Mike Newell	Monty Poole	14 August 1971
Having killed a detective in cold blood, the state psychiatrist and Quarmby activist Dr Benedict returns to his routine of causing chaos for the Guardians and the government. Is it time for action to be taken?
7	"This is Quarmby"	Brian Parker	Arden Winch	21 August 1971
There have been many strikes against the regime, but now the resistance launches a new campaign to persuade public opinion of the innate brutality of the government.
8	"The Dirtiest Man in the World"	Derek Bailey	John Bowen	28 August 1971
An officer of the Guardians is being held at the rehabilitation centre and is making no effort to leave; Dr Benedict does not underestimate the officer’s value as a pawn in the struggle against the Guardians.
9	"I Want You to Understand Me"	Robert Tronson	John Bowen	4 September 1971
When a kidnapped member of the Guardians is assassinated, the Prime Minister is sent an ultimatum: restore democracy or face more kidnappings and chaos.
10	"The Nature of the Beast"	Mike Newell	Jonathan Hales	11 September 1971
Dr Benedict has problems when a man calling himself Quarmby drops into his office without an appointment, while Clare has her own problems with her drugged husband.
11	"The Roman Empire"	Moira Armstrong	John Bowen	18 September 1971
The Prime Minister, fearing for his career, rigs a show trial after a Guardian commander kills three workers during a protest.
12	"The Killing Trade"	Derek Bailey	Jonathan Hales	25 September 1971
Weston is alone after Clare reveals her love for Chris; any escape plan will now be difficult with such limited support.
13	"End in Dust"	Robert Tronson	John Bowen	2 October 1971
Dr Benedict embarks on a high-risk mission, unaware that he is under surveillance. With anger growing in England, the time to take sides has come.

== Release history ==
=== Broadcast ===
The series was originally broadcast between 10 July 1971 and 2 October 1971 on all ITV stations with the exception of Ulster Television (UTV); since UTV served the Northern Ireland area, which was in the early stages of the Troubles, the Independent Television Authority decided that the series was unsuitable for broadcast there due to its political content such as depictions of terrorist activity from the terrorist's point of view, and due to a desire to avoid any unintended connection to the Republic of Ireland's Garda Síochána (whose name translates into "Guardians of the Peace", while the full name of the titular Guardians organisation is "Guardians of the Realm").

=== Home media ===
The series was released on DVD in the UK on 1 February 2010 by Network.

== See also ==
- 1990 – a similar series broadcast in 1977–1978 about a dystopian Britain set in 1990
