= Robert Morris (actor) =

British actor (born 1940)

- Born: 31 August 1940; Gosport, Hampshire, England
- Occupation: Actor

Robert Morris (born 31 August 1940) is a British former actor.

His film credits include the 1967 Hammer films Frankenstein Created Woman and Quatermass and the Pit.

Television credits include: The Avengers, The Saint, Z-Cars, Dixon of Dock Green, The Guardians, Thriller, Warship, Blake's 7 and Kessler.

== Selected filmography ==
- [1960] Wanted: Dead or Alive Season 2, Episode 22: "The Partners" - Billy Joe Henry
