= When the Boat Comes In =

British television period-drama

- Created by: James Mitchell
- Starring: James Bolam; Susan Jameson; James Garbutt; Jean Heywood
- Country of origin: United Kingdom
- Original language: English
- No. of series: 4
- No. of episodes: 51

Production
- Running time: 50 mins
- Production company: BBC Television

Original release
- Network: BBC1
- Release: 8 January 1976 – 21 April 1981

When the Boat Comes In is a British television period drama produced by the BBC between 8 January 1976 and 21 April 1981. Across the whole series, events are set in the time period from 1919 to 1937. The series stars James Bolam as Jack Ford, a First World War veteran who returns to his poverty-stricken (fictional) town of Gallowshield in the North East of England. The series dramatises the interwar political struggles of the 1920s and 1930s and explores the impact of national and international politics upon Ford and the people around him.

== Storyline ==
The story begins in 1919 with Sergeant Jack Ford proudly still wearing his British Army uniform in his hometown and reintegrating with the local community, finding attitudes have changed since 1914. Sgt Ford has to tactfully steer conversations away from the horrors of the trenches and lend an ear to his traumatised fellow soldiers.

== Production ==
The majority of episodes were written by creator James Mitchell, but in series 1 north-eastern writers Tom Hadaway, Sid Chaplin and Alex Glasgow contributed episodes, and in series 3 Jeremy Burnham and Colin Morris shared writing duties with Mitchell. Mitchell also wrote three tie-in books to the TV show: When the Boat Comes In, When the Boat Comes In: The Hungry Years and When the Boat Comes In: Upwards and Onwards. The final book brings the reader up to date with the end of the second series of the TV show.

Series 1 of When the Boat Comes In was produced by Leonard Lewis, Series 2 and 3 were produced by Andrew Osborn, and Series 4 was produced by David Maloney.

The traditional tune "When the Boat Comes In" was adapted by David Fanshawe and sung by Alex Glasgow for the title theme of the series. Fanshawe also composed the incidental music. The BBC revived the series in 1981, with the fourth series telling the story of Jack Ford as he returns to Britain penniless after six years spent bootlegging in the United States and follows him as he sets up in London.

== Series ==
- Series 1: 8 January to 1 April 1976 (13 × 50-minute episodes)
- Series 2: 29 October 1976 to 4 February 1977 (13 × 50-minute episodes)
- Series 3: 8 September to 15 December 1977 (15 × 50-minute episodes)
- Series 4: 17 February to 21 April 1981 (10 × 50-minute episodes)

== Cast ==
=== Regular ===
- James Bolam as Jack Ford (48 episodes; all series)
- James Garbutt as Bill Seaton (39 episodes; series 1–3)
- Jean Heywood as Bella Seaton (39 episodes; series 1–3)
- John Nightingale as Tom Seaton (39 episodes; series 1–3)
- Edward Wilson as Billy Seaton (35 episodes; all series)
- Malcolm Terris as Matt Headley (34 episodes; series 1–3)
- Susan Jameson as Jessie Seaton/Ashton (30 episodes; all series). Jameson is Bolam's wife off screen.
- Madelaine Newton as Dolly Mather/Ford/Seaton (30 episodes; series 1–3)
- Basil Henson as Sir Horatio Manners (25 episodes; series 1–3)
- Geoffrey Rose as Arthur Ashton (18 episodes; series 1–3)
- William Fox as the Duke of Bedlington (13 episodes; series 2–3)
- Isla Blair (5 episodes, series 2) and Lois Baxter as Lady Caroline (15 episodes, series 3–4)
- Rosalind Bailey as Sarah Lytton/Headley (24 episodes; series 2–4)

=== Supporting ===
- Michelle Newell as Mary Seaton (6 episodes; series 1)
- Noel O'Connell as Young Tommy (6 episodes; series 2–3)
- Catherine Terris as Miss Laidlaw (7 episodes; series 2–3)
- Vernon Drake as hotel porter (7 episodes; series 2–3)
- Roger Avon as Stan Liddell (5 episodes; series 2–4)
- Ian Cullen as Geordie Watson (4 episodes; series 2–4)
- Bobby Pattinson as Eddy Morton (4 episodes; series 2–3)

== Episodes ==
=== Series One (1976) ===
Title	Airdate	Overview
# 1: A Land Fit for Heroes and Idiots	8 January 1976	In 1919 Sergeant Jack Ford returns to Gallowshield on discharge leave from the army. He meets Jessie Seaton, a schoolteacher, her brother Tom and his fiancée Mary. Later, Jack meets Jessie's brother, Billy a medical student and her parents – Bill, a miner, and Bella. Will Scrimgour, a shell-shocked ex-soldier, beats a child who was tormenting him. He is arrested and committed for trial despite Jack's evidence about his condition. The magistrate, Major Pinner, who is standing for election as a Liberal, is bitter that he never won a medal. Pinner wins the election, but Jack humiliates him by arranging for local veterans to throw their own medals at him. Featuring James Bate as Will Scrimgour, Roger Hammond as Pinner, Jeffry Wickham as Dr. Lang, Richard Griffiths as P.C. Price, Alec Sabin as Defence.
# 2: Say Hello...... Say Tirra	15 January 1976	Bella takes in Harry, a young boy whose mother has died. Harry steals 10 shillings from a fruit seller. Father Keenley, a local priest, arranges for the boy to be sent on an emigration scheme to Australia; Bella reluctantly agrees. Written by Tom Hadaway; featuring Tony Doyle as Father Keenley, Jeremy Watkin as Harry, Roger Avon as Chairman.
# 3: Fish in Woolly Jumpers	22 January 1976	Times are hard as the miners strike. Jack, who is now engaged to Jessie, still has money. Tom is desperate for money because Mary is suffering from tuberculosis. He borrows from Jack. Jack sleeps with Dolly, the widowed sister of his war comrade, Matt Headley. Tom threatens to expose him unless he can join Jack's sheep-rustling gang. Jack agrees. Tom is almost caught, but Jack knocks out the policeman. Against Jack's expectations, Jessie condones his activities.
# 4: Swords and Pick Handles	29 January 1976	Jack visits Sir Horatio Manners, father of his late commanding officer and gives him a present of a sword. Manners offers him a job. Tom is scabbing to get money for Mary. Jack saves him from a beating. Tom then turns to theft.
# 5: Coal Comfort	5 February 1976	As the strike continues, Bill works out that an abandoned coal seam runs under his house and digs for coal in the front room. Tom pursues two children who have stolen leeks from his allotment but takes pity on them when he discovers that their mother is a war widow with no pension. Written by Alex Glasgow.
# 6: Empire Day on the Slag Heap	12 February 1976	The strike ends with no concessions won by the miners. Jessie's headmaster, Arthur Ashton, proposes to her. Matt tells Jack that Dolly is pregnant and he agrees to marry her. Bill is crippled in an accident at the pit. Jack prevents the mine owner from defrauding him of proper compensation. Jack tells Jessie that he has to marry Dolly. After he leaves, she breaks down in tears.
# 7: A First Time for Everything	19 February 1976	Bella turns the front of the house into a shop using Bill's compensation. Bill, who uses a wheelchair, is initially hostile to the plan. Jessie is impressed by the talent and intelligence of fourteen-year-old pupil Ronnie Fairburn, and tries to dissuade him from working in the mines, but his widowed mother needs the money and Ronnie wants to become a man. He is killed on his first day in the pit. Jessie gets engaged to Arthur and Jack marries Dolly at the Register Office. Written by Alex Glasgow; featuring Tony Nelson as Ronnie, André Maranne as Pierre, Roy Pattison as Deputy.
# 8: Paddy Boyle's Discharge	26 February 1976	Mary has died. Jack meets an old comrade, Sid Hepburn, who is still in the army. Hepburn is with the Black and Tans in Ireland on very good pay. Hepburn and his colleague, Harry Bartram take Jack to see Captain Leslie who tries to recruit him. Paddy Boyle, an Irish member of Jack's sheep-stealing gang, is a member of Sinn Féin. Hepburn and Bartram are shot by Paddy and his Sinn Féin boss, Michael Lynch. Despite a warning cry from Jack, Paddy and Lynch are shot by Captain Leslie. Featuring Ralph Watson as Paddy Boyle, George Irving as Sid Hepburn, Terrence Hardiman as Captain Leslie, Patrick Durkin as Bartram, Eamonn Boyce as Lynch, Gordon Faith as Barman.
# 9: Angel on Horseback	4 March 1976	Tom falls for a nurse, Rosie Trotter. Just before he dies, Bella's uncle Mick Murphy places a bet in Bella's name with his nephew, Ralph, a bookie's runner. Mick's funeral is well-attended, but the winning bet was never placed because Ralph was arrested. Written by Sid Chaplin; featuring J. G. Devlin as Mick Murphy, Judy Lamb as Rosie Trotter, John White as Ralph Murphy, Patrick Newell as the Undertaker.
# 10: King for a Day	11 March 1976	Jack agreed to help Manners buy a house from Lord Calderbeck by acting as front man. At Calderbeck's house, he meets his nephew Freddy who wants to marry Jane Cromer, a wealthy young widow. Jane sleeps with Jack, but eventually decides to marry Freddy. Billy, who is working on a nearby farm, helps Jack obtain inside information, and Jack negotiates a good deal with Freddy and a large commission from Manners. He learns that Dolly has had a miscarriage. Featuring Lesley-Anne Down as Jane Cromer, John D. Collins as Freddy Calderbeck, John Lee as Major Rupert Routledge, Edward Dentith as Doctor.
# 11: Happy New Year, Some Say	18 March 1976	Jack is looking after Glaswegian socialist lecturer Sandy Lewis, who is speaking at the Co-Op Hall. There is also a Tory meeting at the George Hotel, and Tom avoids capture having stolen from the cloakroom. Billy takes Bill to a New Year's party at Jessie's against his will. Jack turns up with Sandy who needs somewhere to stay the night. Bill is summonsed for keeping the shop open too late. He suspects a rival shopkeeper of reporting him, and Sandy throws a brick through his window. Written by Alex Glasgow; featuring Bill Simpson as Sandy Lewis, Shay Gorman as Mr. Gibson.
# 12: Heads You Win, Tails I Lose	25 March 1976	Tom is threatened by two local ruffians from whom he has won money. Jessie tries to persuade widow Lizzie Armstrong to let her son, Robert, take up a grammar school scholarship, but Lizzie needs him to leave school to earn money. Matt proposes to Lizzie who refuses him. Jack helps Tom take on the ruffians, who are then humiliated by a 'tin-panning' by local women arranged by Lizzie. Written by Sid Chaplin; featuring Val McLane as Lizzie Armstrong, Peter Thornton as Dickie Edgar.
# 13: Kind Hearted Rat with a Lifebelt	1 April 1976	Les Mallow, the local branch chairman, asks Jack to help him become district secretary of the fitters union. Jack refuses. He then persuades the branch to vote against a strike and to provide financial help to Mrs Downey, the widow of a union member. Tom is awaiting trial for theft. Widow Downey – who informed on Tom – is evicted. Jack helps her recover her furniture by breaking into her flat. He then lets himself be arrested. Both he and Tom are sent to Durham jail. A month later, Jack is released to a hero's welcome. As planned, he is now favourite to beat Mallow in the election for district secretary, a post with a salary of £400 a year. Featuring John Woodvine as Les Mallow, Pamela Ruddock as Mrs Downey.

=== Series Two (1976–77) ===
Title	Airdate	Overview
# 1: Ask for Twopence, Take a Penny	29 October 1976	Jack is now the district secretary of the fitters union, and he appoints Matt as his deputy. Les Mallow still wants Jack's job and reveals that his predecessor had agreed to ask for a two-pence an hour pay increase. Jack discovers that the plan was to settle for a penny. Mallow says that Jack must deliver this to keep his job beyond the probationary period. Jack persuades Sir Horatio Manners, now chairman of the large Lewis Bishop shipyard, to concede the extra penny to keep him rather than Mallow as union secretary. But Jack is now in Manners' debt. Written by James Mitchell: featuring Alan Browning as Les Mallow, Noel Collins as Baines.
# 2: Tram Ride to the Bluebell	5 November 1976	Jack, Dolly and Matt move to their posh new house in Lavender Avenue. Dolly wants to adopt a child, and is distraught to find that Jack's prison record will prevent this. Tom, now helping in the shop, is threatened by Big Mac, whom he and Jack had exposed as a tobacco baron when they were in prison. Jack and Matt beat up Mac and his friends. Written by James Mitchell: featuring Roddy McMillan as Big Mac.
# 3: A Pillowful of Buttercups	12 November 1976	Jack is approached by Ted Chater, a Sergeant who knew him in Murmansk. Chater has got his girlfriend pregnant, unaware that she was a minor. Jack hides Chater while he looks for the girl. He traces her father, Stobart, and learns that she killed herself after he told her that the regimental adjutant, Captain Barford, would put Chater in prison. Manners invites Barford and Jack to a shooting-party. Manners wants Jack to demolish a country house, Mandrake Place, to make room for a housing project. Jack stops Chater from shooting Barford, but then leaves him to shoot himself. Written by James Mitchell: featuring David Daker as Ted Chater, Paul Darrow as Barford, Colin Douglas as Stobart, Paul Lavers as Aspinall.
# 4: Roubles for the Promised Land	19 November 1976	Billy is unable to get medical work due to his socialist principles. Tom, living in a hostel, befriends Kaganovich, a Russian Jew hoping to travel to Palestine and looking for Jack. Kaganovich accuses Jack of stealing money from his late father during the Russian revolution. Jack claims he was given the money for helping the old man escape. In any case it is worthless 'Kerensky money'. Jack persuades Tom to return home. Written by James Mitchell: featuring David Graham as Kaganovich, Cyril Shaps as Mendel, David Hargreaves as Sol Greenberg, Martin Matthews as Hostel Manager.
# 5: Some Bulbs to Keep the Garden Bright	26 November 1976	Les Mallow wants Jack to expose seed merchant Sanderson, whose brother is on the housing committee and sells plants to council tenants at extortionate prices. If Jack refuses, Les threatens to reveal what Jack had done in Murmansk. He had learned about this from a drunken Matt. Jessie asks Jack to employ Billy as the union's doctor for compensation cases. She lets slip that Mallow has a shameful secret in his family. Jack discovers that Mallow is living off his sister's immoral earnings, and threatens to reveal this unless he backs off. Tom starts work as a jobbing gardener. Written by James Mitchell: featuring Alan Browning as Les Mallow.
# 6: God & Love & Wellesley Street	3 December 1976	Billy gets a job at the Wellesley Street free clinic run by Dr. Stoker. His family disapprove because he has turned down Jack's job offer and will not be able to repay what he owes Bill and Tom. Charlotte Courtnay, a novelist from London, comes looking for her father, a priest who is also working with Stoker. She becomes friendly with Tom, but Jack thinks she is toying with him and persuades her to return to London before he gets hurt. Written by James Mitchell: featuring Ginette Clarke as Charlotte Courtnay, Ralph Michael as Father Courtnay, Gordon Faith as Man Patient.
# 7: Whatever Made You Think the War Was Over?	10 December 1976	To repay his debt to Manners, Jack has to close down production for a week at Buell-Hodge, a firm that pays its workers well over the minimum. Jack calls a strike over conditions at the factory. Using Matt's name, he also discovers that Buell's American machines are dangerous. This enables him to close down Manners' factory as well, so Manners cannot fulfil Buell's big contract and put him out of business. Bella gets drunk and flirts with Jack. Written by James Mitchell.
# 8: Ladies, Women, Sweethearts & Wives	17 December 1976	Bill opens a second shop. Jessie has a baby boy. Jack and Dolly go to a dinner party at the Duke of Bedlington's, where Jack is to negotiate terms for his members to work a new trading estate being built on some of the Duke's land. Manners warns Jack not to take Dolly. As he predicted, bitchy society ladies pick on Dolly, but Lady Caroline, the Duke's daughter, is kind to her. Later, Jack sees Tom offer her a shoulder to cry on. Written by James Mitchell.
# 9: After the Bonfire	7 January 1977	Dolly leaves Jack to be with Tom. Jack gets them both jobs on the duke's staff. He becomes increasingly friendly with Lady Caroline and buys land from her to spite Manners. Billy finally accepts Jack's job offer, saying that the money he earns will be split between repaying his family and Stoker's clinic. Written by James Mitchell.
# 10: A Wreath with Our Names On	14 January 1977	Billy is shocked that Stan Mather, a cousin of Dolly's late husband, is still working at Lewis Bishop despite having pleurisy. When he is fatally injured in an accident, Jack forces Billy to keep quiet about Stan's being unfit to work to ensure his widow gets compensation. Lady Caroline offers to give Dolly and Tom the money for a cottage, but they get it from Bill instead. Jack makes his peace with Dolly and they send Stan's widow a wreath. Written by James Mitchell.
# 11: The Way It Was in Murmansk	21 January 1977	Stan Liddell, local Labour party secretary, asks Jack to speak on behalf of their candidate at the forthcoming election, Geordie Watson. Jack agrees on condition that Matt is made a councillor and gives a rousing speech, also bribing voters to ensure Watson's victory. The elections cause an argument between Jessie and Arthur. Matt's new girlfriend, Sarah Lytton, becomes housekeeper for him and Jack. Written by James Mitchell.
# 12: In the Front Line You Get Shot At	28 January 1977	A factory owner called Colfax refuses on principle to recognise union labour. Manners tells Jack that head office want to try to force the union on Colfax, and says that as a bet Colfax will give him a thousand pounds if the attempt fails. Using Eddy Morton to win the men's support, Jack threatens strike action. But he has to call the strike off when Colfax calls in the police. He suspects that Boothroyd from head office has tipped off Colfax. Jack tears up Manners' cheque for £1000 recognising it as a trick to implicate him in corruption. Bella is rushed to hospital with appendicitis. Written by James Mitchell: featuring John Savident as Colfax, John Bryans as Boothroyd, Geoffrey Toone as Chief Constable, Richard Henry as man in pub.
# 13: The Simple Pleasures of the Rich	4 February 1977	Dolly is pregnant by Tom. Jack announces that he is resigning as Union secretary and handing over to Matt. He will also move out of the house to allow Matt and Sarah privacy when they marry. When Jack demands a high price, Manners refuses to buy the land that Jack obtained from Lady Caroline. Nevertheless, Jack decides to go ahead with the demolition of Mandrake Place. Tom helps in return for Jack's agreeing to let Dolly divorce him. In the event, Jack insists that he rather than Tom fires the shot. Written by James Mitchell.

=== Series Three (1977) ===
Title	Airdate	Overview
# 1: A House Divided	8 September 1977	Matt and Tom rescue the injured Jack from the ruins of Mandrake Place. Arthur is appalled by the destruction and contacts the Association for the Preservation of Great Houses. Its Chairman, James Channing, threatens to prosecute. Jessie warns Jack and offers him an alibi. Jack learns from Caroline that her brother-in-law, Roddy, and Channing have been lovers. To Caroline's disgust, Jack says he will use this to blackmail Roddy into persuading Channing to drop the prosecution. Written by James Mitchell.
# 2: A Tiger, a Lamb & a Basket... of Fruit	15 September 1977	Jessie calls a family meeting to ensure that Matt and Tom are not arrested for their part in the demolition of Mandrake Place. Bill offers Dolly a job managing his new shop in Garibaldi Street. Jack is beaten up by two thugs employed by Roddy. He gets his own back on one of them and then tells Roddy he will get him sent to prison unless all charges are dropped. Written by James Mitchell.
# 3: My Bonnie Lass, Goodbye	22 September 1977	Jack forces Channing to support his story that the destruction of Mandrake Place was an accident. Manners, claiming to believe this story, then refuses to pay him. Jessie is dismayed when Arthur tells her that they are moving to Kent where he has a better paid job. Jack, after a farewell kiss, arranges an introduction with the Kent Fabian Society so she can carry on with her political activities. He then leaves for Scarborough to provide Dolly's grounds for divorce. Written by James Mitchell.
# 4: A Ticket to Care for the Wounded	29 September 1977	Matt's position as union district secretary is threatened by Eddy Morton. In an attempt to show Matt up, Eddy tells Matt that Manners has done a deal with Friedrich von Peltzer, the duke's German nephew. As this could mean his members lose jobs to Germany, Matt threatens strike action unless the deal is cancelled. Matt wins the vote to confirm him in his job, but then makes Eddy his deputy, aware from Billy that he is terminally ill. Dolly persuades Tom to leave the duke's estate so she can run Bill's new shop. Written by Jeremy Burnham.
# 5: Travel Light, Travel Far	6 October 1977	Riddled with cancer, Dr. Stoker takes an overdose and dies, leaving Billy to run the free clinic with only Father Courtnay to help. Jack supplies Dolly with a solicitor, who tells her that she and Tom must live apart to appear blameless. Manners pays Jack to front Pioneer Enterprises, a 'nominee company' to act as go-between with von Peltzer. Matt finds out and fights Jack. He later discovers that Jack's contract with Manners guarantees 20 more fitters jobs. Written by Jeremy Burnham.
# 6: Requiem for a Loser	13 October 1977	Jack learns that the witness to his infidelity has died. Dolly, told by her solicitor that her own adultery jeopardises her case, accuses Jack of deliberately stalling. Billy collapses from exhaustion. At Sarah's insistence, Matt asks Jack rather than Eddy Morton to be his best man. Eddy is drunk and abusive at the wedding and then drops dead. Father Courtnay, who is leaving the parish, discovers that Jack is trying to buy the Wellesley Street clinic. Written by Jeremy Burnham.
# 7: Debts Owed, Debts Paid	20 October 1977	Jack threatens to reveal that he bought votes for Geordie Watson unless he ensures Matt is made a councillor as promised. Geordie must also get Stan Liddell to ensure that the Council sells Wellesley Street to Jack. Billy asks a fellow doctor if a new operation could allow Bill to walk again. To annoy Manners, Caroline asks Jack to a ball as her father's guest. Written by James Mitchell.
# 8: The Empire Builders	27 October 1977	Billy reveals that Bill might walk again if he has an operation, but Bella is against it. Having bought Wellesley Street cheaply, Jack demands £5000 to sell it to Colfax, who needs to expand there. He persuades Bill to introduce loyalty savings stamps in his shops, the two of them splitting the profits. Written by James Mitchell.
# 9: Look Up & See the Sky	3 November 1977	Colfax visits Jack to haggle over the sale of Wellesley Street. Jack knows that Colfax has already invested in expensive new plant and holds out for the full amount and acceptance of union labour. Colfax eventually agrees when Jack threatens to sell to Manners, who would then be able to bankrupt Colfax and take over his factory. Bella tells Jack about the possibility of an operation for Bill, and Jack reveals this to Tom. Written by James Mitchell: featuring David King as Colfax.
# 10: Letters from Afar	10 November 1977	Left-winger Regan threatens a strike at Lewis Bishop unless a sacked worker is reinstated. Matt resorts to trickery to get information for Jack about Ryders, a local engineering firm run by an old-fashioned patriarch. Joe Prestwick, a former loyal employee, persuades Mr. Ryder to give Billy an old warehouse to use as a new clinic. With Ryders' undervalued shares continuing to rise, Manners tries to buy the Duke's shares. Written by Colin Morris: featuring Nat Jackley as Joe Prestwick, Colin Douglas as Ryder, Roy Pattison as Jones.
# 11: The Father of Lies	17 November 1977	Jack is using a nominee company to buy up Ryders shares for Manners. The Duke warns him off involving Caroline in the scheme. As the share price keeps rising, Manners has to offer Lewis Bishop shares in exchange. Jack persuades Bill to have the operation. Dolly gives birth a month early. Written by Colin Morris.
# 12: Diamond Cut Diamond	24 November 1977	Dolly's divorce comes through and baby Matthew William is christened. Bill goes into hospital. Regan calls an unofficial strike at Lewis Bishop and disrupts Manners' press conference about the Ryders take-over. To assume total control of Ryders, Manners needs the duke's block vote. Jack says he can deliver it, but tells the Duke to vote for Ryder. He persuades Matt to make the strike official and ensures that the news breaks at the meeting. The take-over fails, costing Manners a lot of money and finally giving Jack his revenge for Mandrake Place. Jack and Lady Caroline do well, having sold their shares to Manners when the price was high. Written by Colin Morris.
# 13: A Marriage & a Massacre	1 December 1977	After his operation, Bill is able to walk with a stick. Tom is frustrated working in the shop. Billy and his assistant, medical student Isobel Murcheson, alert Matt to the case of Mr. Dixon, mentally unsound after an accident at Lewis Bishop for which Manners paid his hospital bill. Jack visits the duke who asks him to find out who is sending him threatening letters and killing animals on his estate. Caroline tells Jack she is engaged. Written by James Mitchell.
# 14: High Life & Hunger	8 December 1977	Isobel's reactionary father tries to ban her from working at the clinic. He is Bill's wholesaler and threatens to cut off his credit. Billy and Bill argue and Bill suffers a fall. Jack visits Dixon who sends him away. Jack employs a group of homeless unemployed, including upper class con man High Life DeVere, to help him catch the person threatening the duke. He discovers it is Dixon. Written by James Mitchell: featuring Robert James as Murcheson, James Woolley as High Life De Vere.
# 15: Please Say Goodbye Before You Go	15 December 1977	Jack flirts with Isobel at a charity ball and meets Lady Caroline's fiancé, Mostyn. Jack and High Life catch Dixon breaking into the duke's house to destroy a picture of one of the duke's ancestors who resembles his son, Christopher. Dixon wants revenge because Christopher had seduced his daughter. Manners agrees to look after Dixon. Jack lends Tom money for his own market garden, then tells Matt he is leaving for America. Matt asks why he is going to a land where you can't get whisky. "To sell them some", Jack replies. Written by James Mitchell: featuring Timothy Carlton as Mostyn, James Woolley.

=== Series Four (1981) ===
Title	Airdate	Overview
# 1: Back to Dear Old Blighty	17 February 1981	Jack has made a fortune from bootlegging and lost it in the 1929 Wall Street crash. An alcoholic and in debt to gangsters, he flees New York as a stowaway. In Liverpool he meets Canon Penfold, who gets him a room in a hostel. He has to share with Charlie Rowse, an embittered ex-teacher who forces him to drink and beats him up. Jack hits back at him and quits the hostel. Morty Black, an old business friend from New York, offers him money. Written by James Mitchell: featuring David Graham as Morty Black, Bernard Horsfall as Charlie Rowse, Jeremy Child as Canon Penfold, Tom Georgeson as Captain Moore, Colin McCormack as Starkie.
# 2: A Gift from Heaven	24 February 1981	Jack returns to Gallowshield and lodges with Sarah, who tells him that Matt drowned in a boating accident. Jack learns from the boat's owner, Doughty, that Matt killed himself having stolen union funds to support his mistress, Thelma Clark. She is now dating Sarah's brother, Harry. Harry has photographs of Doughty's smuggling activities with which to blackmail him. Jack steals them and sells them to Doughty. They have Harry beaten up and run him out of town. Jack burns Matt's love letters to Thelma to convince Sarah that he was not unfaithful. Written by James Mitchell: featuring Bryan Pringle as Doughty, Neil Daglish as Harry Lytton, George A. Cooper as Tommy Price, Kevin White as Joe.
# 3: A Medal for the Argentine	3 March 1981	Jack meets Margaret Carter-Brown, the niece of Lewis Bishop's managing director John Hartley. She is a Socialist researching the plight of the unemployed on Tyneside. He takes her to see Danny Lockhart, who is unemployed and has sold his war medal. Hartley learns that the Argentine navy want a warship and asks Jack to use his contacts to win the contract for Lewis Bishop. The deal fails, but Jack is able to win another order for an American millionaire and uses his fee to buy back Danny's medal. Written by James Mitchell: featuring William Squire as Hartley, Arthur Blake as Ossie Edwards, Richard Henry as Danny Lockhart.
# 4: Flies & Spiders	10 March 1981	Doughty introduces Jack to Captain Bauer, who offers Jack work guarding an air-strip in South America against local tribes. Learning that Bauer wants the locals killed for the oil on their land, Jack refuses. He buys fire damaged goods from Bauer and he and Sarah sell them in Gallowshield market. Margaret becomes engaged. Written by James Mitchell: featuring William Squire as John Hartley, Bryan Pringle as Doughty, Paul Shelley as Bauer.
# 5: Oh, My Charming Billy Boy	17 March 1981	Schoolteacher Sid Meek tells Jack about Matt's nephew, Bill Pierce. He is a law student at Oxford but wants to drop out to get married. Sid is secretly in love with Bill and supporting him financially. In Oxford, Jack meets Bill, his patron, Labour philanthropist Violet Laurence, and her niece, Imogen Lorrimer. Jack loans Bill money to pay off his debts. Written by James Mitchell: featuring David Daker as Sid Meek, Paul Antony-Barber as Bill Pierce, Sabina Franklyn as Imogen Lorrimer, Louie Ramsay as Violet Laurence, Kevin Stoney as Mr. Reamer, Angus MacKay as Bonnington, Roy Pattison as Joe Pierce.
# 6: Friends, Romans, Countrymen	24 March 1981	Jack has been living in London for three years with Imogen. She leaves him to avoid scandal as her aunt is standing to be Labour MP for Gallowshield. Tipped off about oil by Geordie Watson, Jack buys cheap land in Gallowshields to sell to the interested company. At a toga party given by Mrs. Laurence for the Tyneside hunger marchers, Jack meets Jessie. Although still married to Arthur, she is seeing upper class socialist Robin Cunningham. She opposes the land deal, but Jack buys her silence by threatening to tell Arthur about Robin. Written by James Mitchell: featuring Sabina Franklyn as Imogen Lorrimer, Louie Ramsay as Violet Laurence, Christopher Neame as Robin Cunningham, Geraldine Stephenson as Choreographer.
# 7: The Bright Young Things	31 March 1981	Having made money from his deal with the oil company, Jack is mixing in London high society. His land agent, Frank, asks Jack to broker the sale of an expensive emerald necklace to Morty Black. The necklace is owned by Philip Martin whose sister, Jane, is unbalanced and would kill to get the necklace for herself. The sale goes ahead. When Jack learns that Morty paid off the mobsters who were after him, he waives his share of the price. Written by James Mitchell: featuring Simon Cadell as Philip Martin, Mel Martin as Jane Martin, David Graham as Morty Black, George Tovey as Beggar, John Slavid as Croupier.
# 8: Action!	7 April 1981	Lady Caroline invites Jack to visit her in Northumberland. Sarah is seeing Stan Lidell. Jack helps shopkeeper Manny Goldstein who is being persecuted by Blackshirt thugs. At a function given by Caroline's husband, Edward Mostyn, Jack argues with the local Fascist leader, Hector Smith-Jameson, which attracts him to socialist guest, Tania Corley. Jack buys a share in Manny's shop and when the thugs attack it again, he forces Smith-Jameson to pay compensation or face prosecution, and then exposes him for having paid money to a Jew. Written by James Mitchell: featuring Timothy Carlton as Mostyn, John Rowe as Smith-Jameson, Ray Mort as Manny, Roy Alon as Fascist.
# 9: Comrades in Arms	14 April 1981	Tania's mother, Lady Leamington, gives a party to raise funds for the victims of Franco in the Spanish Civil War. Billy treats Bob Randall, son of Jack's old sergeant-major Fred, wounded fighting for the Spanish Republicans. Jack considers himself in debt to Fred who once saved his life. Jessie and Billy get Fred to persuade Jack to smuggle guns to the Republicans. Using a pleasure cruise as cover, Jack sails for Spain with Tania, Jessie, Billy and communist Nigel Scott-Palliser. Written by James Mitchell: featuring Clive Merrison as Scott-Palliser, Phyllida Law as Lady Leamington, David Wood as Ceddie Corley, Colin Douglas as Fred Randall, Michael Melia as Raoul Savory, Harry Fielder as 1st Fascist, Steve Ismay as 2nd Fascist, Pat Gorman as Porter.
# 10: Roll of Honour	21 April 1981	Jack learns from Ceddie Corley that Scott-Palliser is planning to have him arrested for gunrunning. He sends Tania home, warns the ship's captain and goes ashore with the ship's steward, Raoul Savory. Jessie is shocked to discover that Scott-Palliser plans to give the guns to the Communists and not to the Socialists. Raoul diverts the Communist convoy. Jack, Jessie, Billy and Raoul set off to deliver the guns to the Socialists. They fight off Franco's Moorish cavalry, but Scott-Palliser is lying in wait and shoots Jack. Written by James Mitchell: featuring Michael Melia as Raoul Savory, Clive Merrison as Scott-Palliser, David Wood as Ceddie Corley, Peter Childs as Captain Bennett.

== DVD releases ==
All four series are available on DVD in the UK.
