= Peter Barkworth =

English actor (1929–2006)

- Born: 14 January 1929; Margate, Kent, England
- Died: 21 October 2006 (aged 77); Hampstead, London, England
- Occupation: Actor
- Years active: 1952–1997
- Partner: David Jones

Peter Wynn Barkworth (14 January 1929 – 21 October 2006) was an English actor. He twice won the BAFTA TV Award for Best Actor; for Crown Matrimonial in 1975 and for Professional Foul and The Country Party in 1978. He also starred in the ITV series Manhunt (1970) and the BBC series Telford's Change (1979). His film appearances included Where Eagles Dare (1968), Patton (1970), International Velvet (1978) and Champions (1984).

== Early life ==
Peter Barkworth was born 14 January 1929 in Margate, Kent. Soon after his birth, the family moved to Bramhall in Cheshire and Barkworth was educated at Stockport School. His headmaster wanted him to go to university but Barkworth had set his heart on a career in acting. In 1946 he won a scholarship to the Royal Academy of Dramatic Art (RADA). He spent the next few years in repertory in Folkestone, with the Arthur Brough company, and also in Sheffield. From the mid-1950s to the early 1960s he taught acting technique at RADA.

== Acting career ==
Television and film appearances followed over four decades. He is perhaps best remembered for playing Mark Telford in the TV series Telford's Change (1979), watched every week by seven million viewers. This series followed the life of a senior banking executive as he downsized to Dover to start his life over again, leaving his wife in London. Barkworth co-starred with Hannah Gordon, with Keith Barron as her seducer.

=== Television ===
Barkworth twice won the BAFTA TV Award for Best Actor, in 1975 for Crown Matrimonial (1974) and in 1978 for his roles in Professional Foul and The Country Party (both 1977). His character in the 1965 boardroom drama The Power Game was a recurring role. He also appeared in the 1970s series The Rivals of Sherlock Holmes as Martin Hewitt.

In 1967 he appeared in various episodes of The Avengers and also had a part in the Doctor Who serial The Ice Warriors as Leader Clent. From January until June 1970, he appeared in a leading role as Vincent in the World War II drama series Manhunt on LWT. He featured in an episode of sci-fi drama Undermind (1965), and the dystopian The Guardians (1971), and starred in the mystery mini-series Melissa (1974) as an out of work writer whose wife goes missing. Barkworth also played the expatriate British novelist Hugh Neville in the episodes Guilt and Lost Sheep of Secret Army (1977).

Later TV included the part of Stanley Baldwin in Winston Churchill: The Wilderness Years (1981), and the serials The Price (1985) and Late Starter (also 1985) in both of which he played angst-filled, middle-aged, middle class characters beset by marital problems in the context respectively of a kidnapping and the early retirement of an academic. Both these series and Telford's Change were based on Barkworth's original ideas. In 1988 Barkworth had a leading guest role in the fourth season Sherlock Holmes adaptation of the Arthur Conan Doyle story "Silver Blaze." In one of his last roles, he starred opposite his former RADA student Michael Gambon in the 1993 episode "Maigret and the Minister" of ITV's Maigret series.

=== Theatre ===
Back on the stage, Barkworth appeared in numerous plays in the West End, notably as Edward VIII in Royce Ryton's Crown Matrimonial starring alongside Wendy Hiller at the Haymarket Theatre in 1972, a role which he repeated on TV two years later. He also played this role in 1975, being nominated for the Laurence Olivier Award for Best Comedy Performance in 1976. He also devised a one-man show based on the work of Siegfried Sassoon.

=== Film ===
His film career began in 1959 with A Touch of Larceny. He had subsequent roles in No Love for Johnnie (1961), Two a Penny (1967), Where Eagles Dare (1968), Patton (1970), Escape from the Dark (1976), International Velvet (1978) and Champions (1983). His last appearance was in the film Wilde in 1997. He then retired from acting.

== The arts ==
Barkworth was a member of the Council at RADA for 16 years during the 1980s and 1990s. His book About Acting – formerly titled The Complete About Acting – is often recommended reading for students and professional actors alike. He also edited For All Occasions: A Selection of Poems, Prose and Party Pieces (1997). He was an avid collector of mainly British art. He left his collection of paintings to the National Trust and they are displayed at Fenton House in Hampstead. The works include two small Constables, several paintings by artists from the Camden Town Group, and many watercolours.

== Personal life ==
Barkworth lived in Hampstead for many years, and died at the Royal Free Hospital in London of bronchopneumonia 10 days after suffering a stroke. He was survived by his partner, David Wyn Jones.

== Testimonials ==
In The Sunday Times, John Peter wrote:

Peter Barkworth: an actor of the utmost skill and refinement, whose physical control and spiritual awareness has always had a jewel-like gleam and precision.

Stockport College has a theatre named after him.

== Filmography ==
=== Film ===
Year	Title	Role	Notes
1953	Malta Story	Cypher Clerk	Uncredited
1954	You Know What Sailors Are	Naval Lieutenant	Uncredited
1956	South Sea Bubble	Captain Christopher Mortlock	TV film
1960	A Touch of Larceny	Sub Lieutenant Brown	
1961	No Love for Johnnie	Henderson	
1961	Seven Keys	Estate Agent	
1961	No My Darling Daughter	Charles	
1962	Tiara Tahiti	Lieutenant David Harper	
1962	Play It Cool	Skinner	
1963	The Cool Mikado	Fanshawe	Uncredited
1964	Downfall	Tom Cotterell	
1965	You Must Be Joking!	Television Studio Director	Uncredited
1967	Two a Penny	Vicar	
1968	Where Eagles Dare	Berkeley	
1970	Patton	Colonel John Welkin	
1972	Who Sunk the Lusitania?	Captain Turner of the Lusitania	TV film
1973	The Love Ban	Bra Factory Director	
1974	Crown Matrimonial	King Edward VIII	TV film
1974	Intent to Murder	George Bates	TV film
1976	Escape from the Dark	Richard Sandman	
1978	International Velvet	Pilot	
1983	The Secret Adversary	Mr. Carter	TV film
1984	Champions	Nick Embiricos	
1997	Wilde	Charles Gill	

=== Television ===
Year	Title	Role	Notes
1952	BBC Sunday Night Theatre	Captain Horace Parkes	Episode: "Adam's Apple"
1955	ITV Television Playhouse	Lieutenant Shirley	Episode: "Quay South"
1957	ITV Play of the Week	Edgar	Episode: "Venus Observed"
1960	Maigret	Sergeant	Episode: "A Man of Quality"
1961	The Dickie Henderson Show		Episode: "The Move"
1961	Tales of Mystery	Gerald	Episode: "The Woman's Ghost Story"
1961	ITV Television Playhouse	Ernest Harper	Episode: "The Portrait"
1961	ITV Television Playhouse	M. Loiseau	Episode: "Boule de Suif"
1961	BBC Sunday-Night Play	Charles Darwin	Episode: "Fury in Petticoats"
1961	BBC Sunday-Night Play	Maurice Liddell	Episode: "The Big Noise"
1963	No Hiding Place	Johnnie Miller	Episode: "Four Faces of Clare"
1963	About Religion	Introduction	Episode: "Epilepsy"
1963	The Scales of Justice	Robbins	Episode: "Position of Trust"
1963	Emergency Ward 10	Jack Denbigh	Recurring role
1963	ITV Play of the Week	Frank	Episode: "The Heart of the Country"
1963	ITV Play of the Week	James Stack	Episode: "The Finambulists"
1964	ITV Play of the Week	Reverend Bennett	Episode: "Tarnish on a Golden Boy"
1964	Edgar Wallace Mysteries	Tom Cotterell	Episode: "Downfall"
1964	The Protectors	Tilsworth	Episode: "The Deadly Chameleon"
1964	Detective	Detective Inspector Christopher Smith	Episode: "The Hungry Spider"
1964	Love Story	Umberman	Episode: "I Love, You Love, We Love"
1965	Public Eye	Eric Hart	Episode: "Nobody Kills Santa Claus"
1965	Front Page Story	Ian Westley	Episode: "Official Opening"
1965	The Sullavan Brothers	Peter Roman	Episode: "The Corrupters"
1965	Undermind	Victor Liberton	Episode: "Intent to Destroy"
1965	Armchair Theatre	Driving Instructor	Episode: "The Keys of the Cafe"
1965–1969	The Plane Makers	Kenneth Bligh	Series regular
1967	ITV Play of the Week	Robert	Episode: "A Roof Over Our Mouths"
1967	The Avengers	Percy	Episode: "The Correct Way to Kill"
1967	Half Hour Story	Jimmy Halliwell-Holmes	Episode: "Wedlock"
1967	Haunted	Reverend Vernon Gates	Episode: "Many Happy Returns"
1967	The Gamblers	Wyndham	Episode: "My Dear Sirs"
1967	The Revenue Men	Captain Brett	Episode: "The Exile"
1967	Doctor Who	Clent	Episode: "The Ice Warriors"
1967	Thirty-Minute Theatre	Eric	Episode: "Turn Off If You Know the Ending"
1968	A Man of our Times	Roberts	2 episodes
1968	The First Lady	Bailey	Episode: "Upset"
1968	Ooh La La!	Le Compte Emile	Episode: "The Missing Person"
1968	Frontier	Mortimer Berkeley	Episode: "A Little Before His Time"
1968	The Sex Game	Simon	Episode: "A Quartet at Sheila's"
1968	Thirty-Minute Theatre	Frank Cross	Episode: "A Matter of Principle"
1969	The Wednesday Play	Dr. George Mackintosh	Episode: "Doctor Atkinson's Daughter"
1969	The Avengers	Merlin	Episode: "The Morning After"
1969	The Expert	Williams	Episode: "The Yellow Torrish"
1969	W. Somerset Maugham	Mr. Jephson	Episode: "P. and O."
1969	Special Project Air	Wing Commander Routledge	Episode: "Project Singapore"
1969	Out of the Unknown	Stephen	Episode: "Get Off My Cloud"
1969	ITV Playhouse	Keith Bailey	Episode: "End of Story"
1970	Manhunt	Vincent	Series regular
1970	Armchair Theatre	Bob	Episode: "The Company Man"
1971	Thirty-Minute Theatre	Tom Harris	Episode: "Asquith in Orbit."
1971	Paul Temple	Springett	Episode: "Has Anybody Here Seen Kelly?"
1971	Shadows of Fear	John Dolby	Episode: "Come Into My Parlour"
1971	Out of the Unknown	Dr. Philimore	Episode: "To Lay a Ghost"
1971	Crime of Passion	Roland	Episode: "Roland"
1971	Armchair Theatre	Dickie	Episode: "Office Party"
1971	The Guardians	Quarmby	Episode: "The Dirtiest Man in the World"
1971	The Passenger	Detective Inspector Martin Denson	Three episodes
1971	The Rivals of Sherlock Holmes	Martin Hewitt	2 episodes
1971	BBC Play of the Month	Tsar Nicholas II	Episode: "Rasputin"
1972	The Man Outside	Major Richard Grimsby	Episode: "The Birdwatcher"
1972	Dead of Night	Captain Rolph	Episode: "Return Flight"
1972	Colditz	Brauner	Episode: "The Spirit of Freedom"
1972	ITV Playhouse	Nicolas Randolph	Episode: "Dear Octopus"
1972	BBC Play of the Month	Julius Sagamore	Episode: "The Millionairess"
1973	ITV Sunday Night Theatre	Mr. Bell	Episode: "The Regulars"
1974	Good Girl	Eustace Morrow	Series regular
1974	Melissa	Guy Foster	Three episodes
1974	Omnibus	The Doctor	Episode: "Joseph Conrad"
1975	Omnibus	Thomas Mann	Episode: "Thomas Mann: The Fight Against Death"
1975	Play for Today	Richard Elkinson	Episode: "The Saturday Party"
1975	BBC Play of the Month	Prime Minister Joe Proteus	Episode: "The Apple Cart"
1975	BBC Play of the Month	Earl of Rintoul	Episode: "The Little Minister"
1976	Red Letter Day	Gilbert	Episode: "The Five Pound Orange"
1976	BBC2 Playhouse	Lawrence	Episode: "An Accident of Class and Sex"
1977	Three Piece Suite	Cast Member	Segment: "Briefer Encounter"
1977	BBC2 Play of the Week	Anderson	Episode: "Professional Foul"
1977	Secret Army	Hugh Neville	2 episodes
1978	The Lively Arts	Josef Von Spaun	Episode: "Schubert: A Winter's Journey"
1979	Telford's Change	Mark Telford	Series regular
1979	Jackanory	Storyteller	Recurring role
1980	The Morecambe & Wise Show	Self/Hamlet	Episode: "1980 Christmas Show"
1981	Winston Churchill: The Wilderness Years	Stanley Baldwin	Mini-series
1982	Tales of the Unexpected	Richard Mellor	Episode: "What Have You Been up to Lately?
1985	The Price	Geoffrey Carr	Mini-series
1985	Late Starter	Edward Brett	Series regular
1987	London Embassy	Sir Charles Smallwood	Episode: "The Man on the Clapham Omnibus"
1988	The Return of Sherlock Holmes	Colonel Ross	Episode: "Silver Blaze"
1993	Maigret	The Minister	Episode: "Maigret and the Minister"
1993	Heartbeat	Frank Milner	Episode: "End of the Line"
