= John Nightingale (actor) =

British actor (1942–1980)

John Nightingale (23 December 1942 – 31 March 1980) was a British actor, from Burnley, Lancashire

Nightingale spent 5 years in the National Youth Theatre and, while still a student at Durham University, appeared on BBC television in a production of Julius Caesar, playing Titinius. He was best known for his role in the popular 1970s TV series When the Boat Comes In. He played Tom Seaton, one of the two sons in the Seaton family at the centre of the series.

He had other parts in British television, including Jack Reedy in The Stars Look Down, also a historical drama set in a mining community, Fall of Eagles, Thriller and Crown Court.

John Nightingale died on 31 March 1980 from cancer. At the time of his death he was 37 years old.
