= Geoffrey Davion =

British actor (1940–1996)

Geoffrey Davion (born Geoffrey Davison; 27 January 1940 in South Shields, County Durham – 13 February 1996 in Westminster, London) was an English television and Shakespearean stage actor, notably starring alongside Alun Armstrong in the popular series The Stars Look Down. He starred as Superintendent Nash in the TV film Marple: The Moving Finger from 1985. He also acted in the cult classic film Clockwise and has worked with many other notable actors such as Ian McKellen and Kenneth Branagh. He was married to Jennifer Hill;

== Filmography ==
- Clockwise (1986) – Policeman at Crash #2

== Theatre ==
- A Streetcar Named Desire (1969) – Drunk
