= John Bowen (British author) =

British playwright and novelist (1924–2019)

- Born: 5 November 1924; Calcutta, British India
- Died: 18 April 2019 (aged 94)
- Education: University of Calcutta; Pembroke College, Oxford; St Antony's College
- Occupations: Playwright and novelist
- Partner: David Cook (1963-2015)

John Griffith Bowen (5 November 1924 – 18 April 2019) was a British playwright and novelist.

== Early life ==
John Bowen was born in Calcutta, India, to Ethel (née Cook) and Hugh Bowen; his father was the manager of the Shalimar Print Works in Gobariah. John Bowen's grandfather was an Inspector of Police in Calcutta. At the age of five and a half, he was placed on a boat in Bombay and sent back to Britain where he was brought up by his uncle Donald and aunt Dolly in Whitehaven. Bowen was sent to board at Queen Elizabeth's Grammar School, Crediton in Devon, where he developed an interest in literature and drama.

In 1939, his mother returned to England with her three younger children, Patricia (b. 1926) and twins Daphne and David (b. 1930), and rented a house near Crediton. In 1940, having read about the bombing of Britain in The Times of India, Bowen's father sent a cable to his wife saying "Bring the children out", though no bombs had fallen in or near Crediton. The whole family returned to India, where Bowen spent an unhappy year living in the YMCA in Calcutta and working in a semi-clerical job. Eventually he told his father that when the war was over, he wanted to go to university at either Oxford or Cambridge, and that he had better acquire some sort of qualification. So, in 1941 he left his job and went to study at the Jesuit-run North Point College in Darjeeling, where he was awarded the Intermediate Arts degree of the University of Calcutta.

At the age of 18, much to his chagrin, he was drafted into the army, and during the latter part of World War II, served as a captain in the Mahratta Light Infantry until 1947, serving as a Railway Transport Officer in transhipment stations in Bengal.

In 1948, he returned to Britain to study at the University of Oxford (at Pembroke College and St Antony's College), where he gained an MA in modern history, and edited the university magazine, Isis. After graduating, Bowen won a Fulbright Scholarship and spent a year teaching and hitch-hiking through the USA.

== Writing career ==
=== Advertising and early theatre work ===
Bowen returned to Britain in 1953, moved to London and spent three years as an assistant editor on The Sketch magazine. He then turned to advertising, and while working at J. Walter Thompson (1956–58), he was part of the team that launched the successful marketing campaign for Rowntree's "Have a break, have a Kit-Kat", which is still used to advertise the product. It was during this period that he wrote his first three novels, two of which were published by Faber & Faber: The Truth Will Not Help Us (1956) is about a political witch-hunt; After the Rain (1958, later adapted for the stage) is set in the future and following a group of people attempting to survive a flood; and The Centre of the Green (1959) focuses on a family torn apart by their son's marital infidelity. After the Rain was performed at the Duchess Theatre in London and the John Golden Theatre on Broadway in 1967, starring Alec McCowen in the lead role.

=== 1960s and 70s television heyday ===
In 1960, after leaving the comfort of the full-time job, Bowen and fellow advertising copywriter Jeremy Bullmore began writing together using the joint pseudonym of Justin Blake. Their character, Garry Halliday was picked up by the BBC, who commissioned them to write a children's adventure serial for television which starred Terence Longdon in the title role. Halliday was a pilot (not unlike Biggles) who found himself solving crimes and overcoming villains. The eight TV series became immensely popular and spawned five spin-off novels.

From the early 1960s, Bowen focused on writing for television, including contributions to series such as Front Page Story (1965), The Power Game (1966) and seven episodes of the 13-part thriller The Guardians (1971). Bowen continued writing and producing for many long-running drama strands on both the BBC and ITV throughout the 1970s, including ITV Play of the Week, Armchair Thriller, the same network's Playhouse and Weekend Playhouse. He also adapted Shakespeare's Julius Caesar as Heil Caesar in 1973 and wrote a television remake for ITC of the film Brief Encounter (1974), which starred Richard Burton and Sophia Loren.

Play for Today teleplays include "Robin Redbreast" (1970), "The Emergency Channel" (1973) and "A Photograph" (1977). The element of folk horror in Robin Redbreast and The Photograph was also seen in his teleplays "A Woman Sobbing" for Dead of Night (1972) and two entries in the A Ghost Story for Christmas strand; "The Treasure of Abbot Thomas" (1974) and "The Ice House" (1978).

Bowen continued to be a prolific writer for the stage. I Love You, Mrs. Patterson (1964) concerned the romantic entanglement of a student and his teacher's wife, and Little Boxes (1968) consisted of two one-acts, the first about aging vaudevillians and the second about the attempts of a young lesbian couple to conceal their affair. The Disorderly Women (1969) was a modernization of Euripides' The Bacchae. The Corsican Brothers (1970) was based on the story by Alexandre Dumas père, and the production at the Greenwich Theatre starred Bowen's partner David Cook alongside Gerald Harper.

=== 1980s and 90s ===
Bowen returned to writing novels in the 80s: Squeak (1983) written from the point of view of a pigeon Bowen and David Cook had tended from a chick; The McGuffin (1984) – a Hitchcockian thriller – was dramatised for television in 1986 by Michael Thomas; The Girls (1986) is a dark story of village life set near his rural Warwickshire home.

In the mid-1990s, the BBC commissioned Bowen and David Cook to create the TV detective drama Hetty Wainthropp Investigates, based on Cook's 1988 novel Missing Persons. The character of Hetty Wainthropp was loosely based on Cook's mother, Beatrice, and was portrayed by Patricia Routledge alongside Derek Benfield as her long-suffering husband Robert, and Dominic Monaghan as her sleuthing side-kick, Geoffrey.

== Personal life ==
In 1963, he met the actor David Cook, who had been cast in a minor speaking role in one of Bowen's television plays. Bowen and Cook began a romantic relationship which lasted for 52 years; the couple split their time between the flat they shared in South Kensington and their cottage in rural Warwickshire. Largely thanks to Bowen's encouragement, Cook also turned to writing and became a successful novelist and screenwriter in his own right. Following David Cook's death from pancreatic cancer in September 2015, Bowen remained in their Warwickshire home, cared for by Cook's nephew and his husband. Bowen died on 18 April 2019, aged 94.

== Selected works ==
=== Novels ===
- The Truth Will Not Help Us: Embroidery on an Historical Theme. London, Chatto and Windus, 1956.
- After the Rain. London, Faber, 1958; New York, Ballantine, 1959. A review can be found here
- The Centre of the Green. London, Faber, 1959; New York, McDowellObolensky, 1960.
- Storyboard. London, Faber, 1960. A review & cover text can be found here
- The Birdcage. London, Faber, and New York, Harper, 1962. A review can be found here
- A World Elsewhere. London, Faber, 1965; New York, CowardMcCann, 1967.
- Squeak (1983)
- The McGuffin (1984)
- The Girls: A Story of Village Life. London, Hamish Hamilton, 1986;New York, Atlantic Monthly Press, 1987.
- Fighting Back. London, Hamish Hamilton, 1989.
- The Precious Gift. London, Sinclair Stevenson, 1992.
- No Retreat. London, Sinclair Stevenson, 1994.

=== Television plays ===
In the mid-1960s Bowen switched to writing plays for theatre and television.

- ITV Play of the Week "The Candidate" (1961)
- ITV Play of the Week "The Truth About Alan" (1963)
- ITV Play of the Week "A Case of Character" (1964)
- ITV Play of the Week "The Corsican Brothers" (1965)
- ITV Play of the Week "Mr. Fowlds" (1965)
- ITV Play of the Week "Finders Keepers" (1965)
- ITV Play of the Week "Ivanov" (adaptation, 1966)
- ITV Play of the Week "The First Thing You Think Of" (1966)
- After the Rain (1966), based on his novel
- ITV Play of the Week ITV Summer Playhouse #9: "The Voysey Inheritance" (adaptation of the play by Harley Granville-Barker, 1967)
- Thirty-Minute Theatre "Silver Wedding" (1967)
- ITV Playhouse "I Love You Miss Patterson" (1967)
- Play For Today "Robin Redbreast", (1970)
- Thirty-Minute Theatre "The Waiting Room" (1971)
- The Guardians 7 episodes (1971)
- Villains "Belinda" (1972)
- Dead of Night "A Woman Sobbing" (1972)
- ITV Sunday Night Theatre "Young Guy Seeks Part-Time Work" (1973)
- ITV Sunday Night Theatre "The Coffee Lace" (1973)
- Heil Caesar BBC – a three-part television play (1973; shown on BBC2 21 Oct 1974 as one 90 minute broadcast)
- Play For Today "The Emergency Channel" (1973)
- A Ghost Story for Christmas "The Treasure of Abbot Thomas" (1974)
- Play For Today "A Photograph" (1977)
- A Ghost Story for Christmas "The Ice House" (1978)
- Wilde Alliance "A Game for Two Players" (1978)
- ITV Playhouse "The Specialist" (1980)
- ITV Sunday Night Thriller "Dark Secret" (Pts 1 & 2, 1981)
- Screen Two "The McGuffin" (1986) based on his novel
- Hetty Wainthrop Investigates 11 episodes co-written with David Cook (1996 – 1997)

=== Stories for children ===
- Pegasus, illustrated by Kenneth Rowell (Faber and Faber, 1957), OCLC 558230703, LCCN 59-12810
- The Mermaid and the Boy, illus. Rowell (Faber, 1958), OCLC 752665269, LCCN 60-10199
