= James Garbutt =

British actor (1925–2020)

- Born: 12 September 1925; Houghton-le-Spring, County Durham, England
- Died: 5 April 2020 (aged 94); Kingston upon Thames, Surrey
- Occupations: FAA pilot, art teacher, actor
- Years active: 1955–2002

James Garbutt (12 September 1925 – 5 April 2020) was a British actor. His best known roles are as Rab in series 2 of The Borderers, Robert Onedin in series 3 of The Onedin Line and Bill Seaton in three series of When the Boat Comes In.

== Early life ==
Born the son of a miner in Houghton-le-Spring, County Durham in 1925, Garbutt was educated at St Cuthbert's Grammar School. He began his career working in accountancy with a firm in Sunderland when he was accepted for pilot training with the Fleet Air Arm in 1943. This led him to Canada and the United States for 18 months, getting just three days leave during this time, being trained in Texas. He finally gained his "wings" on 15 August 1945, the day the Second World War came to an end.

== Career ==
On the advice of a fellow officer, Garbutt decided to use his skill at drawing to get into art school, enrolling at the King Edward Art School in Newcastle upon Tyne in 1947. It was while here that he was asked to help out at the People's Theatre, designing sets, producing and acting. Staying on at the art school to get a teaching diploma, he met Alan Browning, who suggested that he should take up acting.

In 1950, Garbutt got a job as an assistant stage manager at Tynemouth Repertory Theatre. By 1955, he gave up his teaching career to become a professional actor with the company. However, after a year, he left, unable to make enough money, so went to work for an advertising agency. Returning to teaching, Garbutt became head of the art department at Kenton Comprehensive School when in 1968, Browning informed him of a walk-on part in Close the Coalhouse Door. Lured by the theatre, Garbutt accepted but upon being promoted to the role of Will Jobling, he decided to give up his teaching career for good. Touring with the play to the West End, Garbutt's performance impressed an agent, winning him parts on television.

Other credits include The Wednesday Play, Z-Cars, The Troubleshooters, Owen, M.D., Warship, Doctor Who (in the serial Genesis of the Daleks), Bill Brand, Juliet Bravo, One by One, All Creatures Great and Small, Boon, Between the Lines, Soldier Soldier (Band of Gold episode, which features Robson & Jerome singing in an impromptu wedding band) and Casualty.

He died on 5 April 2020 at the age of 94.

== Filmography ==
| Year | Title | Role | Notes |
|---|---|---|---|
| 1978 | The Thirty Nine Steps | Miller | |
| 1978 | Superman | 5th Elder | (Krypton Council) |
| 2001 | High Heels and Low Lifes | Mr. Winters | |
