= Whose Life Is It Anyway? (play) =

Play written by Brian Clark

- Original language: English
- Written by: Brian Clark
- Characters: Ken Harrison (Claire Harrison in some later productions); Dr. Scott; Dr. Emerson; Mrs. Boyle; Andrew Eden; Dr. Barr; Mr. Justice Millhouse; John; Peter Kershaw; Sister Anderson; Dr. Paul Travers; Kay Sadler; Philip Hill
- Subject: Accident victim, paralysed from the neck down, fights for the right to die.
- Genre: Drama
- Setting: a London hospital

Premiere
- Date: 1978
- Place: Mermaid Theatre; London, England

Whose Life Is It Anyway? is a play by Brian Clark adapted from his 1972 television play of the same title, which starred Ian McShane. The stage version premiered at the Greenwich Theatre in SE London before moving in 1978 to the Mermaid Theatre in London, and subsequently opened on Broadway in 1979. The play involves a sculptor who is paralysed.

== Plot ==
Set in a hospital room, the action revolves around Ken Harrison (Claire Harrison in some later productions), a sculptor by profession, who was paralysed from the neck down (quadriplegia) in a car accident and is determined to be allowed to die. Clark presents arguments both in favour of and opposing euthanasia and to what extent government should be allowed to interfere in the life of a private citizen. In portraying Ken as an intelligent man with a useless body, he leaves the audience with conflicting feelings about his desire to end his life.

== Productions ==
The play was televised on 12 March 1972 by Granada TV. It was directed by Richard Everitt, with the cast that featured Ian McShane (Ken), Suzanne Neve (Dr. Scott), and Philip Latham (Dr. Emerson).

Whose Life Is It Anyway? opened at the Mermaid Theatre, London, on 6 March 1978, before playing at the Savoy Theatre from June 1978 to October 1979. This production originally starred Tom Conti and Jane Asher. Conti transferred to New York to star in the Broadway production, which was produced by Emanuel Azenberg and directed by Michael Lindsay-Hogg. It opened at the Trafalgar Theatre on 17 April 1979 and ran for 223 performances and 9 previews. Conti, who was making his Broadway debut, was joined by Jean Marsh and Philip Bosco. Conti was nominated for a Drama Desk Award and won the 1979 Tony Award for Best Actor in a Play. Both the play itself and Lindsay-Hogg were nominated as well.

The play, again directed by Lindsay-Hogg, was revived on Broadway at the Royale Theatre, where it opened on 24 February 1980 after nine previews. A gender reversal found Mary Tyler Moore in the lead role, renamed Claire, and James Naughton as her now-male doctor. Josef Sommer completed the principal cast. The play ran for 96 performances. Moore was nominated for a Drama Desk Award as Outstanding Actress in a Play and won a special 1980 Tony Award for her performance.

The play was revived in London at the Harold Pinter Theatre from January to April 2005, directed by Peter Hall and starring Kim Cattrall as Claire. Husband and wife Laurence Luckinbill and Lucie Arnaz starred in the national tour of the play. The two rotated playing the patient (Ken/Claire) and doctor.

== Adaptations ==
Whose Life Is It Anyway? was adapted from Clark's own television play of the same title directed by Richard Everitt starring Ian McShane.

A film adapted by Reginald Rose and directed by John Badham was released in 1981, starring Richard Dreyfuss, John Cassavetes, and Christine Lahti.

Author David Benedictus adapted the play into a novel, which was also released in 1981.

== Awards and nominations ==
=== Awards ===
- 1978 Laurence Olivier Award for Best New Play
- 1979 Selection, Burns Mantle, The Best Plays of 1978-1979
- 1979 Tony Award for Best Actor in a Play – Tom Conti
- 1980 Special Tony Award – Mary Tyler Moore

=== Nominations ===
- 1979 Tony Award for Best Play
- 1979 Tony Award for Best Direction of a Play – Michael Lindsay-Hogg
- 1989 Outstanding Actress in a Play – Mary Tyler Moore
