= Malcolm Terris =

English actor (1941–2020)

- Born: Malcolm Hope Terris; 11 January 1941; Sunderland, County Durham, England
- Died: 6 June 2020 (aged 79); Denville Hall, Northwood, London, England
- Occupation: Actor
- Years active: 1963–2011

Malcolm Hope Terris (11 January 1941 – 6 June 2020) was an English actor.

== Early life ==
Educated at Barnard Castle School, Terris began his career as a trainee reporter on the Sunderland Echo newspaper from 1959 to 1961. Through this line of work, he became a regular at the Sunderland Empire Theatre, watching dozens of performances and meeting theatrical personalities while writing theatre news and attending first night shows with the paper's critic. At the age of 20, he decided to become an actor, so enrolled at the Guildhall School of Music and Drama, spending two years there. This led to performing in Margate, back to the Empire at Sunderland and joining the BBC Drama Repertory Company before working in Liverpool and touring the United States in Tony Richardson's 1969 production of Hamlet.

== Career ==
He acted in many television programmes, including possibly his best-known role as Matt Headley in When the Boat Comes In, a popular 1970s series.

His film career includes appearances in The First Great Train Robbery (1978), McVicar (1980), The Plague Dogs (1982; voice only), Slayground (1983), The Bounty (1984; as Thomas Huggan, ship's surgeon), Mata Hari (1985), Revolution (1985), Scandal (1989), Chaplin (1992) and Mike Bassett: England Manager (2001).

His TV appearances include:

"The Dominators" and "The Horns of Nimon" episodes of Doctor Who (1968 and 1979–80). One episode of Rooms (1974) and four episodes of the mini-series Reilly, Ace of Spies (1983) and Rockliffe's Babies (1986-88). Regular episodes of Coronation Street, mostly as Eric Firman in the mid-1990s. His last acting role came in April 2011 as Len Merryman in an episode of Midsomer Murders.
