= Peter Howell (actor) =

English actor (1919–2015)

- Born: Peter Norman Bulmer Howell; 25 October 1919; London, England
- Died: 20 April 2015 (aged 95); Northwood, England
- Occupation: Actor
- Years active: 1952–2004
- Spouse: Susan Cheshire (m. 1957; died 1992)
- Children: 4

Peter Norman Bulmer Howell (25 October 1919 – 20 April 2015) was an English actor. Howell was active in film, television, radio and theatre.

== Biography ==
=== Early life ===
Born in London, England, he was educated at Winchester College and began studying law at Christ Church, Oxford, but left in 1939 after being called up for military service in World War II. He served as a second-lieutenant in the Rifle Brigade, but was invalided out with dysentery during the North Africa Campaign in 1943. Shortly after, he made his professional stage debut with the Old Vic company. His West End plays included The Affair, The Doctor's Dilemma, Little Boxes, and Conduct Unbecoming.

== Career ==
Howell's most recognised role was as Dr. Peter Harrison in television hospital drama series Emergency Ward 10 from 1958 to 1964, making brief returns to the series in 1966 and for the show's final episode in 1967. He made guest appearances in The Avengers, The Prisoner, Bill Brand, the Doctor Who serial The Mutants, and Yes Minister. He played the prison governor in the 1979 film Scum.

On BBC Radio 4, Howell played Ducem Barr in the episode The General from The Foundation Trilogy during 1973, Saruman in the 1981 adaptation of The Lord of the Rings and had a recurring role as the Right Reverend Cyril Hood, Bishop of Felpersham, in the long-running drama The Archers from 1987 to 2006. He also played the role of Sir William Lucas in the 1980 BBC adaptation of Jane Austen's novel Pride & Prejudice, a miniseries also featuring Elizabeth Garvie and David Rintoul.

== Personal life and death ==
Howell married Susan Cheshire in 1957, and they remained together until her death in 1992. They had three daughters, Polly, Tamara and Camilla, and a son, Benji. He was a close friend of fellow actor Sir Ian McKellen, who was godfather to his daughter Tamara.

Howell was an active member of the Labour Party who campaigned for a number of social issues. He was also a longtime member of the Marylebone Cricket Club, and opposed their planned 1968–69 England cricket tour of apartheid-era South Africa, which was eventually cancelled. He helped to raise funds for the building of Watermans Arts Centre near his home in Chiswick, west London.

Howell died at Denville Hall, a home for retired actors in Northwood, London, on 20 April 2015 after a short illness, aged 95.

== Filmography ==
Year	Title	Role	Notes
1960	Tarzan the Magnificent	Dr. Blake	
1960	Watch Your Stern	Admiral's Secretary	
1960	No Kidding	Father of Angus	
1961	The Hellfire Club	William Pitt – Earl of Chatham	
1961	Raising the Wind	Prof. Lumb	
1962	Two Letter Alibi	Carlton	
1963	Incident at Midnight	Inspector Macready	
1964	The Devil-Ship Pirates	The Vicar	
1979	Scum	Governor	
1984	John Wycliffe: The Morning Star	Dr. John Wycliffe	
1985	AD	Atticus	TV Mini-Series, 2 episodes, Uncredited
1987	Bellman and True	The Bellman	
1993	Shadowlands	College President	
1994	Princess Caraboo	Clerk of the Court	
1996	The Innocent Sleep	Sir Frank	
2004	The Libertine	Bishop	(final film role)
