= List of The Tomorrow People serials =

This is a list of stories of the British science fiction series, The Tomorrow People. It was originally broadcast from 1973 to 1979, with a revival series airing from 1992 to 1995.

ITV broadcast the original series of The Tomorrow People in the 1970s. Nickelodeon broadcast the original 1970s version in the United States in the early 1980s, and broadcast all five stories from the 1990s series in the United States and Australia. The Seven Network in Australia broadcast the original series, as did Television New Zealand. Both shows were also seen in other parts of the World.

== Series overview ==
=== 1970s series overview ===
| Series | Episodes | Originally released | |
| Series | Episodes | First released | Last released |
|---|---|---|---|
| 1 | 13 | 30 April 1973 | 30 July 1973 |
| 2 | 13 | 4 February 1974 | 6 May 1974 |
| 3 | 13 | 26 February 1975 | 21 May 1975 |
| 4 | 7 | 21 October 1975 | 28 January 1976 |
| 5 | 6 | 28 February 1977 | 4 April 1977 |
| 6 | 6 | 15 May 1978 | 26 June 1978 |
| 7 | 6 | 9 October 1978 | 11 November 1978 |
| 8 | 4 | 29 January 1979 | 19 February 1979 |

=== 1990s series overview ===
| Series | Episodes | Originally released | |
| Series | Episodes | First released | Last released |
|---|---|---|---|
| 1 | 5 | 18 November 1992 | 16 December 1992 |
| 2 | 10 | 4 January 1994 | 8 March 1994 |
| 3 | 10 | 4 January 1995 | 8 March 1995 |

== 1970s series ==
=== Series 1 (1973) ===
Regular Cast: Nicholas Young (John), Peter Vaughan-Clarke (Stephen), Sammie Winmill (Carol), Stephen Salmon (Kenny), Philip Gilbert (Voice of TIM), Michael Standing (Ginge)
Producer: Ruth Boswell

| Title | Episodes | First aired | Writer(s) | Director |
|---|---|---|---|---|
| Slaves of Jedikiah | 5 | 30 April - 4 June 1973 | Roger Price, Brian Finch | Paul Bernard |
Stephen, up until now an ordinary schoolboy, suddenly collapses on a London street as the mental ordeal of "breaking out" begins. The three existing Tomorrow People (John, Carol and Kenny), aware of his ordeal, manage to make contact with him and guide him through the process, but are unable to keep him from being kidnapped by Ginge and Lefty, two Cockney thugs working for the mysterious Jedikiah, who wants the Tomorrow People for their psychic powers, and who serves in turn the even more mysterious Cyclops. Jedikiah turns out to be in reality the Cyclops' shape-changing robot; the Cyclops (implied to be of the same race as Polyphemus, the Cyclops of Homer's Odyssey) turns out to be an alien traveller stranded near Earth after an accident killed his crew of telepaths, whose powers are needed to operate his ship's engines. Jedikiah is damaged and goes berserk, damaging the ship and dooming it to explode; the Tomorrow People, however, are able to jaunt the Cyclops off the ship to Earth, and contact other aliens who can provide the Cyclops with the atmosphere he needs to breathe and with transport back to his own star system. Jedikiah survives the explosion of the ship and is left drifting in space; Ginge and Lefty become the Tomorrow People's allies.
Guest Cast: Derek Crewe (Lefty), Francis de Wolff (Jedikiah), Robert Bridges (Cyclops), Patricia Denys (Mrs Jameson), Neville Barber (Dr. Stewart)
| The Medusa Strain | 4 | 11 June - 2 July 1973 | Roger Price, Brian Finch | Roger Price |
In the twenty-sixth century non-telepath Count Rabowski's vessel, secretly located in hyperspace, recovers the drifting robotic form of Jedikiah, who proceeds to befriend the Count. Rabowski has captured a young "Time Guardian", Peter. Rabowski is able to nullify Peter's TP abilities by using "the Medusa", a predatory ambulatory plant that preys on telepathic animals on its homeworld through nullifying their psionic abilities. Peter is forced to transport Rabowski and Jedikiah back to 1973 to steal the Crown Jewels in the Tower of London, but are foiled by Stephen and Carol. Carol, however, is captured. Rabowski uses his "ability" to kill and hurt others (an ability blocked in the tomorrow people by the "Prime Barrier") to force Peter to open the time lanes. Jedikiah takes over the vessel, planning to use Peter to stop the Tomorrow People's "Great Emergence" in the twenty-first century, after which they displace homo sapiens. Peter is able steal the prison key from Jedikiah and sabotage the time key so that Jedikiah (carrying the crown jewels) is sent back to Mercury in the distant past, rather than Earth. At the last minute Rabowski makes a grab for the jewels and is transported to the surface of Mercury (and presumably his death) with Jedikiah.
Guest Cast: Richard Speight (Peter), Roger Bizley (Jedikiah), Roger Booth (Rabowski), David Prowse (Coppin), Norman McGlen (Medusa)
| The Vanishing Earth | 4 | 9–30 July 1973 | Roger Price, Brian Finch | Paul Bernard |
Alien criminal Spidron is mining the Earth's core for rare minerals, leading to serious geological planetwide instability that may shatter the planet. Ginge, while holidaying at the seaside, is captured when visiting the Haunted House at a funfair and ends up working under the Spidrons control to mine the precious minerals. Lefty seeks out the Tomorrow People to locate their friend and for the first time, the Tomorrow People encounter the Galactic Federation, a network of fellow telepaths from different species that have banded together to protect galactic peace, and prevent the exploitation of more vulnerable species.
Guest Cast: Derek Crewe (Lefty), Ken Farrington (Smithers), Kevin Stoney (Steen), Nova Llewellyn (Joy), John Woodnutt (Spidron), David Weston (Number 300)

=== Series 2 (1974) ===
Regular Cast: Nicholas Young (John), Peter Vaughan-Clarke (Stephen), Elizabeth Adare (Elizabeth), Chris Chittell (Chris), Philip Gilbert (Voice of TIM)
Producer: Ruth Boswell

| Title | Episodes | First aired | Writer(s) | Director |
|---|---|---|---|---|
| The Blue and the Green | 5 | 4 February - 4 March 1974 | Roger Price | Roger Price |
As Carol and Kenny have chosen to leave Earth to become off-planet members of the Galactic Federation, a new Tomorrow Person, schoolteacher Elizabeth M'Bondo, breaks out. As this is going on, violence around the world is increasing, due to blue and green badges being distributed by a disguised alien species, the D'henagali, who need large amounts of violent energy in order to metamorphose into their energy-based adult phase and leave the planet. According to TIM, this happened once before, in ancient Rome, where the Blues and the Greens destabilised the empire, leading to its long-term collapse. The Tomorrow People turn Skylab into a giant stun gun to prevent widespread destruction. However, the violent emotions emitted through the sleeping populace's dreams gives the D'henagali more than enough energy to leave Earth, and they gratefully do so without further incident.
Guest Cast: Nigel Pegram (Grandfather), Jason Kemp (previously credited as) Anthony Kemp (Robert), Simon Merrick (Police Inspector), Ray Burdis (Johnson)
| A Rift in Time | 4 | 11 March - 1 April 1974 | Roger Price | Darrol Blake |
Time Guardian Peter is able to contact John and Stephen in simultaneous vague dreams, directing them to find a first century A.D. Roman "Gladiator Vase" in the computer database of New York State University's Department of Antiquities. Encoded into the pot are directions for John and TIM to construct a "makeshift time disc". When Stephen attempts to use the device, he is trapped by the Time Guardians for unauthorised use of the time lanes. He is able to convince the Time Guardians to help the Tomorrow People travel to ancient Britain to help Peter, who has been enslaved in a gladiator school without his abilities. In ancient Britain, Roman officers from an alternate history are trying to alter the past in order to restore their own timeline, one in which the Roman Empire did not fall in CE 476 due to the premature invention of a working steam engine; with a thirteen hundred year technological head start on our own world, it has become the core of a major galactic empire.
Guest Cast: Bryan Stanyon (Professor Cawston), Richard Speight (Peter), Sylvia Coleridge (Professor Sylvia Garner), Stanley Lebor (Gaius), Leonard Pieroni (Lothar), Stephen Jack (Zenon), Peter Duncan (Cotus)
| The Doomsday Men | 4 | 8 April - 6 May 1974 | Roger Price | Roger Price |
Stephen goes undercover at a private Scottish school in order to investigate "The Doomsday Men". The Doomsday Men are a deranged group of militarists, intent upon disrupting peace talks in order to preserve a life of military action and the chance to achieve glory in battle. The Doomsday Men are successful in preventing disarmament talks by hijacking a nuclear missile armed space station, aptly named Damocles. With the help of Lee Wan, an astronaut saved from drifting in space, the Tomorrow People are able to re-take the space station and foil The Doomsday Men's plans.
Guest Cast: Simon Gipps-Kent (Paul), Derek Murcott (Major Longford), Arnold Peters (Dr. Laird), William Relton (Douglas McLelland), Lindsay Campbell (Lt General McLelland), Nigel Pegram (Traffic Warden), Eric Young (Lee Wan), Bill Treacher (Doomsday Man)

=== Series 3 (1975) ===
Regular Cast: Nicholas Young (John), Peter Vaughan-Clarke (Stephen), Elizabeth Adare (Elizabeth), Dean Lawrence (Tyso), Philip Gilbert (Voice of TIM)
Producer: Ruth Boswell

| Title | Episodes | First aired | Writer(s) | Director |
|---|---|---|---|---|
| Secret Weapon | 4 | 26 February - 19 March 1975 | Roger Price | Stan Woodward |
An experimental weapons research establishment abducts new Tomorrow Person Tyso Boswell, who is in the process of breaking out, and it is revealed that Earth's governments are engaged in a covert psionic arms race that involves the exploitation of telepaths. Led by Colonel Masters, who wants to exploit telepaths as a decisive new secret weapon in the Cold War, he manages to get his hands on Stephen when the latter comes looking for Tyso. Masters is being helped by a young woman, Tricia Conway, who is partially telepathic and can hear the Tomorrow People all the time. After some desperate tactics, involving the temporary kidnapping of the British Prime Minister, the Tomorrow People gain the assistance of the British government, which orders Masters to release Elizabeth, Stephen and Tyso. John confronts an agonized Tricia, who is traumatised by the magnitude of telepathy that 'full telepaths' like the Tomorrow People are capable of, with a tantalizing observation: it is not too late for Tricia herself to break out.
Guest Cast: Bryan Stanyon (Professor Cawston), Anne Curthoys (Patricia Conway), Trevor Bannister (Col. Masters), Hugh Morton (Prime Minister), Frank Gatliff (Father Martin O'Connor), Joanna Tope (Mrs Boswell), Denise Cook (Evergreen Boswell), Chris Chittell (Chris)
| Worlds Away | 3 | 26 March - 9 April 1975 | Roger Price | Vic Hughes |
Timus Irnok Mosta, a maverick Galactic Federation diplomat, arranges for the Tomorrow People to intervene in the affairs of Peeri, a medieval earthlike world where the native telepaths, or 'Vesh' are hunted, persecuted and burnt as witches, at the mercy of a cruel Vesh-Hunter elite. It is also revealed that the alien Kulthan Empire were responsible for delaying the emergence of homo superior on Earth and elsewhere through installing a hidden "psi damper" in the Great Pyramid of Cheops. Peeri has a similar device concealed within one of its own pyramids, until John deactivates it.
Guest Cast: Joanna Tope (Mrs Boswell), Denise Cook (Evergreen Boswell), Lydia Lisle (Lenda), Philip Gilbert (Timus / Tikno), Keith Chegwin (Arkron), Reg Lye (Vanyon)
| A Man for Emily | 3 | 16–30 April 1975 | Roger Price | Stan Woodward |
Three humanoid aliens appear in an automated starship, refugees from a nuclear war that destroyed their species generations ago, resulting in a matriarchal culture and cannibalism on board the vessel. Unfortunately, the vessel still has its own operative nuclear weapons, which are aimed at Earth when the manboy slave Elmer goes on the run with plans to settle on the more male friendly Earth.
Guest Cast: Peter Davison (Elmer), Sandra Dickinson (Emily), Margaret Burton (The Momma), Robin Parkinson (Publican), Bill Dean (Mr Greenhead)
| Revenge of Jedikiah | 3 | 7–21 May 1975 | Roger Price | Vic Hughes |
An old nemesis returns for one last attempt to destroy the Tomorrow People. The Kulthan Empire retrieve Jedikiah's robotic body from the surface of Mercury during the time of ancient Egypt, reactivate his shapechanger abilities, and use him as a Pharaoh. He then remains inactive as an Egyptian mummy and re-emerges in 1975. Upon his return, he becomes the assistant to a second rate magician in order to pursue the Tomorrow People. During the course of the storyline, Jedikiah impersonates Stephen and kills Colonel Masters, leading to John and Elizabeth being gunned down by the British military, as is Timus' clone brother, Tikno when he tries to heal them. Fortunately, they all survive and recover- because of the strain of the aforementioned events and the proximity of full telepaths, Tricia breaks out and jaunts to the Lab, reactivating TIM for long enough for him to produce a distress call to the Galactic Trig. Jedikiah's plot is eventually foiled when Timus arrives and removes his shape shifting abilities, condemning him to life on Earth as a human derelict. The Tomorrow People are granted honorary status at the Galactic Federation and are taken away by Timus, along with Tricia, with only a vague and haunting promise from Elizabeth to Professor Cawston to return...sometime.
Guest Cast: Francis de Wolff (Jedikiah), Bryan Stanyon (Professor Cawston), Anne Curthoys (Patricia Conway), John Lyons (Sergeant Evans), Denise Cook (Evergreen Boswell), Ali Bongo (Mustaf), Anne Ridler (Professor Johnston)

=== Series 4 (1975-76) ===
Regular Cast: Nicholas Young (John), Peter Vaughan-Clarke (Stephen), Elizabeth Adare (Elizabeth), Dean Lawrence (Tyso), Philip Gilbert (Voice of TIM), Mike Holoway (Mike Bell)
Producer: Roger Price

| Title | Episodes | First aired | Writer(s) | Director |
|---|---|---|---|---|
| One Law | 3 | 21 October - 5 November 1975 | Roger Price | Leon Thau |
The Tomorrow People return to Earth after an intergalactic vacation. It is revealed that Tricia Conway has become a law enforcement agent with the Federation and is working off-world (this was due to Anne Curthoys being unable to reprise the role as she had begun work on the British soap opera Rooms). They recruit Mike, a new Tomorrow Person from a Cockney working class background who has, in their absence, started to break out but fallen in with organized crime. They rescue him from the clutches of criminal boss Lord Dunning but Stephen and Tyso later realise Mike is back in league with the crooked peer. The TPs confront Mike who vanishes......is he really abusing his powers or setting up Dunning?
Guest Cast: Tim Barrett (Inspector), Harold Kasket (Lord Dunning), Patrick McAlinney (Mr O'Reilly), Arnold Diamond (Thwaites), John Hollis (Two Tone), Norman Mitchell (Slow)
| Into the Unknown | 4 | 7–28 January 1976 | Jon Watkins | Roger Price |
The Tomorrow People investigate an alien shuttle drifting in space. They meet up with Kwaan and his father Tirayaan, who informs them that their father-ship has been stolen by warrior Vaktaan. They get into the ship but are threatened by Vaktaan and his men. They escape back to the shuttle but find that it is travelling towards a hole in space and they are unable to avoid it. After a long journey, they realise it is a tunnel and they emerge from the other side only to discover they are back where they started. The tunnel it seems was looped. Vaktaan sees the shuttle reappearing and opens fire on it. John and the others manage to steer the shuttle away and the blast hits the tunnel, which loops back and destroys the father-ship.
Guest Cast: Geoffrey Bayldon (Tirayaan), Stephen Garlick (Kwaan), Brian Coburn (Vaktaan), Raymond Boyd (Ralaa)

=== Series 5 (1977) ===
Regular Cast: Nicholas Young (John), Elizabeth Adare (Elizabeth), Mike Holoway (Mike Bell), Philip Gilbert (Voice of TIM)
Producer: Vic Hughes

| Title | Episodes | First aired | Writer(s) | Director |
|---|---|---|---|---|
| The Dirtiest Business | 2 | 28 February - 7 March 1977 | Roger Price | Vic Hughes |
Pavla, a young Russian telepath, escapes from her Soviet intelligence minders in central London, prompting the SIS to raid the Tomorrow People's headquarters. The Tomorrow People set out to find Pavla before either the KGB or the SIS do. Mike locates her outside a disco but a sudden appearance from KGB agents makes her flee the scene. Later, she does fall back into their hands before a daring raid by the SIS sees her become a prisoner of the British. Hooked up on a machine to extract memories from her brain, a horrified Mike contacts the Russian ambassador (another KGB agent) in the hope he can get her released, having fallen in love with her. But the KGB has implanted a miniaturized incendiary device in Pavla's brain which is detonated to stop her revealing too much, killing her. She dives out a window to save the lives of the others and Mike is left distraught.
Guest Cast: Anulka Dziubinska (Pavla), Jan Murzynowski (KGB Man), Gabor Vernon (Senior KGB Man), Vivien Heilbron (Major Ann Turner), Royce Mills (Dr. Taylor), Steve Ismay (S I S Sergeant)
| A Much Needed Holiday | 2 | 14–21 March 1977 | Roger Price | Richard Mervyn |
To get over the tragedy of Pavla's death, The Tomorrow People take another vacation, this time to a primitive planet, where ruthless Kleptons have enslaved the population to steal the planet's diamonds. The trio discover this and set out on a night time raid to rescue the enslaved children and expel the greedy aliens.....
Guest Cast: Anthony Garner (Gremlon), Guy Humphries (Trig), David Corti (Trog)
| The Heart of Sogguth | 2 | 28 March - 4 April 1977 | Roger Price | Vic Hughes |
Mike's band gets a new manager, who happens to be the leader of a cult that worships Sogguth, an evil god (possibly even the Devil) who will be brought back to Earth by the power that the band's music is producing. John comes under his malign influence and attempts to murder Elizabeth.....with the Fresh Hearts about to be broadcast to millions on live television, only she is left to save the world.
Guest Cast: Roddy Maude-Roxby (Jake), James Smillie (Mike Harding), Derek Pascoe (Derek), Bill Rice (Bill), Flintlock (Jamie Stone, John Summerton, Mike Holoway) (The Fresh Hearts)

=== Series 6 (1978) ===
Regular Cast: Nicholas Young (John), Mike Holoway (Mike), Misako Koba (Hsui Tai), Philip Gilbert (Voice of TIM)
Producer: Vic Hughes

| Title | Episodes | First aired | Writer(s) | Director |
|---|---|---|---|---|
| The Lost Gods | 2 | 15–22 May 1978 | Roger Price | Peter Webb |
The Tomorrow People discover another one of their number, Hsui Tai, a young Japanese woman kept captive and worshipped as a goddess in a Chinese monastery that practises human sacrifice on children just as they are entering adulthood. This maintains the power of the high Priest so John and Mike set out to stop him but Hsui Tai still believes she will be reborn when burnt alive.
Guest Cast: Burt Kwouk (Matsu Tan), Robert Lee (Sage)
| Hitler's Last Secret | 2 | 5–12 June 1978 | Roger Price | Leon Thau |
The Tomorrow People discover that Adolf Hitler was an alien metamorph who is also now behind the rise of neofascism amongst European youth. Mike is berated by John for wearing Nazi clothes but the teenager is falling under the power of Hitler due to a genetic disorder set up during the war. Hitler is re awakened from his suspended animation in a Bavarian mountain ready to take control of the new Fourth Reich.
Guest Cast: Michael Sheard (Hitler), Richard Warner (Professor Friedl), Leon Eagles (Major Hughes), Nicholas Lyndhurst (Karl Brandt), Earl Rhodes (Willi Frisch)
| The Thargon Menace | 2 | 19–26 June 1978 | Roger Price | Peter Yolland |
Alien Thargon youths crash-land on the Earth, and the conniving Pacific Island dictator Papa Minn tries to use them to create advanced weaponry for his plans of world domination until their own military arrives. The Tomorrow People ally themselves with the Thargon militia to try and stop them.
Guest Cast: Olu Jacobs (General Papa Minn), Michael Audreson (Flynn), Jackie Cowper (Sula), Eric Roberts (Major Marcos), David Graham (The Puppet Voices)

=== Series 7 (1978) ===
Regular Cast: Nicholas Young (John), Elizabeth Adare (Elizabeth), Mike Holoway (Mike), Misako Koba (Hsui Tai), Nigel Rhodes (Andrew Forbes), Philip Gilbert (Voice of TIM)
Producer: Vic Hughes

| Title | Episodes | First aired | Writer(s) | Director |
|---|---|---|---|---|
| Castle of Fear | 2 | 9–16 October 1978 | Roger Price | Vic Hughes |
New Scottish Tomorrow Person Andrew Forbes is beset by his father, Bruce, who has religious fears about the nature of his son's new-found abilities. The youngster has been conjuring up images of ghosts to drum up interest at their Highland hotel but the Tomorrow People are seeing these events in their dreams. Arriving in Scotland Andrew realises they are after him so runs away and hides out in a deserted old tower.
Guest Cast: Dominic Allan (Bruce Forbes), Bill Gavin (Angus McDuff), Jennifer Watts (Professor Gail Mayer), Brian Jackson (Professor Young), Gregor Fisher (Uncredited Highlander episode 2)
| Achilles Heel | 2 | 23–30 October 1978 | Roger Price | Gabrielle Beaumont |
Cantor and Yagon are two rogues who want to mine the anti-telepath element balmain for use in an anti-telepath galactic black market amongst 'psi-null' worlds that cannot develop their own telepaths. They check into the Forbes hotel and Andrew is immediately suspicious of their strange behaviour. Following them to an old Kultan mine, he is rendered powerless when the duo find a vein of balamin in the rock.....Meanwhile, John, Liz and Mike jaunt to the aliens spaceship to establish what is going on but are similarly rendered powerless!
Guest Cast: Dominic Allan (Bruce Forbes), Hilary Minster (Yagon), Christian Rodska (Cantor), Stanley Bates (Glip), Philip Gilbert (Timus), Ted Taylor (Accompanist)
| The Living Skins | 2 | 6–11 November 1978 | Roger Price | Stan Woodward |
A new fashion craze for Bubble Skin jumpsuits is sweeping across the planet but this apparently harmless fashion is really something very sinister. Ameboid aliens try to use a youth style craze to invade Earth, temporarily taking over Mike, Hsui Tai, John and Elizabeth in the process. As the Balboids take over the planet John's cold may be the only way to save humanity.
Guest Cast: Ralph Lawford (Wilton), Judith Fielding (Girl), Dave Carter (Guard)

=== Series 8 (1979) ===
Regular Cast: Nicholas Young (John), Elizabeth Adare (Elizabeth), Mike Holoway (Mike), Misako Koba (Hsui Tai), Nigel Rhodes (Andrew Forbes), Philip Gilbert (Voice of TIM)
Producer: Vic Hughes

| Title | Episodes | First aired | Writer(s) | Director |
|---|---|---|---|---|
| War of the Empires | 4 | 29 January - 19 February 1979 | Roger Price | Vic Hughes |
The Sorson and Thargon Empires are at interstellar war, within contested planetary systems adjacent to Earth. Earth gets involved when the Sorsons establish a base on the Earth's moon for use against the Thargons, who destroys a US space shuttle in the crossfire. Fortunately, John and Mike manage to jaunt aboard the shuttle and rescue the pilots in the nick of time. The US President agrees to Earth's involvement in the war, while the Galactic Federation is beset by its usual bureaucratic infighting. Angry, the Tomorrow People alienate the Federation and must stop the Thargons from devastating the Earth, which is still regarded as a strategic target even after the Sorsons have left, but only after the Thargons break the fragile alliance because technology theft is believed to have occurred.
Guest Cast: John F. Parker (American President), Richard Bartlett (American General), David Baxt (Morgan Evans), Oliver Maguire (Thargon General), David Cann (Chaircreature), Terence Woodfield (Sorson Captain), Percy Herbert (Thargon Commander), Anthony Stafford (Thargon Officer)

== 1990s series ==
Tomorrow People: Kristian Schmid (Adam Newman), Christian Tessier (Megabyte (Marmaduke Damon)), Adam Pearce (Kevin Wilson) (only until The Culex Experiment), Kristen Ariza (Lisa Davies) (only in The Origin Story), Naomie Harris (Ami Jackson) (from The Culex Experiment), Alexandra Milman (Jade Weston) (The Living Stones with a brief appearance in The Culex Experiment)
Producer: Roger Damon Price (Series 1), Alan Horrox (Series 2 and 3)

=== Series 1 (1992) ===
Note: A short test pilot version of the first episode entitled A Bad Dream Gets Real was created before full production began. Its content was roughly that of the first two episodes of The Origin Story. This remains unaired, as it was an internal proof of concept only. The main cast was made up of the same actors, except that Stephen Pollard played Kevin.

| Title | Episodes | First aired | Writer(s) | Director |
|---|---|---|---|---|
| The Origin Story | 5 | 18 November - 16 December 1992 | Roger Damon Price | Ron Oliver |
Certain young people begin to mysteriously vanish and reappear all over the World. Unknown to unscrupulous agents investigating, they are transported to a remote Pacific island where a mysterious alien spaceship has been wrecked for centuries. Adam Newman, an Australian, is the first to appear on the island and soon discovers the ship. Marmaduke "Megabyte" Damon and Kevin Wilson are school friends. Megabyte, from Vermont, USA but living in London and Kevin a native Londoner. During a sleepover, Megabyte discovers a psychic link between himself and Kevin, but believes that the mind reading ability is Kevin's alone. After Kevin disappears and reappears several times over the next day, Megabyte suggests that Kevin is psychic and can teleport. Lisa Davies, from Virginia, USA, disappears due to extreme anxiety while attempting to perform at a children's talent show. Lisa and Adam meet on the island and with the help of the ship they learn that they are Tomorrow People and begin to explore their psionic abilities. Meanwhile, the authorities (Colonel Masters, Professor John Galt and Gloria) are closing in on Lisa due to her public disappearance and set up a trap at the location of the talent show. Megabyte and Kevin travel to Virginia, by conventional means, after seeing news of Lisa's disappearance. They intervene in Lisa's capture, inadvertently getting Megabyte caught instead. The Tomorrow People must rescue their new friend and thwart the agents' plans to capture and exploit them all
Guest Cast: Jeff Harding (General Bill Damon), Hugh Quarshie (Professor John Galt), Manning Redwood (Colonel Masters), Romilly Nolan (Gloria), Shezwae Powell (Mrs. Davies), Gabrielle Hamilton (Lady Mulvaney), Tom Kerridge (Hulk), Callum Dixon (Ray), Charles Balfour (Smith), Lou Hirsch (Jones), Avril Angers (Mrs Hawthorne), Paul Humpoletz (Boris), Linda Goens (Sammi), Ricco Ross (Sgt. Young), Fidelma Meehan (Sgt. Holloway), Sally McClaren (Newsreader), Monica Peck (Newspaper girl), Wolf Mueller (MC)

=== Series 2 (1994) ===
| Title | Episodes | First aired | Writer(s) | Director |
|---|---|---|---|---|
| The Culex Experiment | 5 | 4 January - 1 February 1994 | Lee Pressman & Grant Cathro | Alan Horrox & Viviane Alberine |
While on his way to meet Megabyte at the train station, Kevin runs into a lab coat-wearing victim of an apparent abduction orchestrated by the sinister Doctor Culex and her twin hench(wo)men. When he finally meets Megabyte and Adam at the train station he too falls victim to Doctor Culex and is left in a coma. Ami Jackson, who is visiting her mother in the same hospital that Kevin is taken to, feels a psychic connection with Kevin. Despite the protests of her mother, Ami falls into company with Adam and Megabyte. The three and Kevin's aunt Ruth investigate Doctor Culex, hindered by the bumbling Inspector Platt. The Tomorrow People must stop Doctor Culex's evil plans to steal a unique machine invented by her former colleague Doctor Connor, and find a cure for Kevin, all while Ami comes to terms with her newly discovered powers
Guest Cast: Jean Marsh (Eliza Jeffries / Doctor Culex), Connie Booth (Doctor Lucy Connor), Denise Coffey (Aunt Ruth Tanner), Roger Sloman (Inspector Platt), Adam Blackwood (Doctor Poole), Sally Sagoe (Mrs Jackson), Deborah Vale and Tessa Vale (The Twins), Jeff Harding (General Damon), Bazil Otoin (Jim), Richard Rees (Doctor Leong), Janet Amsden (Commander Scott), Nicky Twining (Richie Conrad)
| Monsoon Man | 5 | 8 February - 8 March 1994 | Lee Pressman, Grant Cathro | Niall Leonard |
Lucy Allen, an eager cadet reporter bumps into Adam outside a nightclub before witnessing a baffling occurrence of a frozen cat-burglar while on her way home. Her further illegal and dangerous investigation lands her in trouble with a hired goon named Wilkie. Adam and Megabyte attempt to find Lucy, but are frustrated by people posing as residents claiming that she never existed. Meanwhile, Ami's mother is still protesting Ami's involvement with the Tomorrow People. She rudely rejects Megabyte's morning visit before attempting to ground Ami. However, fate proves the stronger force, pulling Ami into the mystery. The Tomorrow People must solve the mystery of the vanishing Lucy, and thwart the maniacal Colonel Cobb's underhanded and dangerous plans to rule the breakfast cereal market using a dangerous weather machine invented by the spineless Professor Middlemass.
Guest Cast: Laurence Bouvard (Lucy), Kerry Shale (Wilkie), Christopher Benjamin (Middlemass), John Judd (Les Bishop), Sally Sagoe (Mrs Jackson), Faith Edwards (Annette), Alwyn Taylor (Doctor Roberts), Peter Aubrey (Colin), Paula Jacobs (Betty), Steve Knowles (Salesman), Stuart Fox (Policeman), William Hootkins (Colonel Cobb), Peggy Mount (Mrs Butterworth), Ian McNeice (Quentin D'Arcy), Simone Bendix (Au Pair), Nonie Ken (Tammy), Michael Benz (Vinny), Mac McDonald (Twitch), Anthony Venditti (Beef), Vincent Marzello (Zimmerman), Bob Sessions (TV Reporter), Jonathan Markwood (Policeman)

=== Series 3 (1995) ===
| Title | Episodes | First aired | Writer(s) | Director |
|---|---|---|---|---|
| The Rameses Connection | 5 | 4 January - 1 February 1995 | Grant Cathro | Roger Gartland |
As a crystalline meteoric rock (The Marhaba Stone) is stolen from a museum exhibit. Adam, Megabyte and Ami are contacted from the past by Tutankhamun a boy pharaoh from Ancient Egypt and one of the first tomorrow people. Trying to find the meaning of the Ancient-Egyptian message sends The Tomorrow People on a dangerous and surreal adventure. Joining forces with the bizarre Millicent F Rutherford and her even more bizarre friends The Tomorrow People must travel to Egypt, and discover who or what Amtoudi is in order to save the World from an ancient evil over 4000 years in the making. An Evil who is no stranger to the nature of the Tomorrow People.
Guest Cast: Christopher Lee (Sam Rees), Elizabeth Spriggs (Millicent F. Rutherford), Robert Lang (Hubert Tate), Andrew Powell (Scully), Adjoa Andoh (Amanda James), Mark Biltcliffe (CID Officer), Fidelma Meehan (WPC), Adam Dean (Tutankhamun), Sally Sagoe (Mrs. Jackson), Rolf Saxon (Roach), Anthony O'Donnell (Red Rainwear), Sarah Flind (Lynzie Motherwell), Christopher Brand (Rupert Short), Akbar Kurtha (Hotel Receptionist), Harry Jones (Felix Fry)
| The Living Stones | 5 | 8 February - 8 March 1995 | Lee Pressman | Crispin Reece |
Jade, who was first introduced in The Culex Experiment, is woken by her dog at night and witnesses a meteorite falling from the sky. While she is investigating a subsequent occurrence, she is captured by a military operation headed by General Damon (Megabyte's father) an operation aggravated by the meddling General Beaumont-Savage. Ami is off on a tour of Australia, leaving Adam and Megabyte to help General Damon and Jade solve why everyone in her village suddenly likes to mysteriously sit in the dark with sunglasses on; and what exactly they are doing in secret with all the meteorites; and what all this has to do with the comeback tour of Rock star Byron Lucifer who will be performing in front of many fans.
Guest Cast: Sally Sagoe (Mrs Jackson), Jeff Harding (General Damon), Rosemary Leach (Gladys Toms), Patricia Hayes (Felicity Triplett), Sharon Duce (Penny Weston), Clive Merrison (General Beaumont-Savage), Danny John-Jules (Byron Lucifer), Ron Berglas (Frank), George Raistrick (Chester Toms), Duncan Faber (Sergeant Manx), Jim Sweeney (Greg Golden), Jester (Jessie the Dog), Briony Glassco (Beth Halliday), Akim Mogaji (Doctor Bradley), Clara Onyamere (Henderson), Trevor Steedman (Murdo)

== Audio series ==
From 2001 to 2007, five series of audio adventures starring some of the original 1970s cast were released by Big Finish Productions. A planned sixth series was cancelled.

=== Series 1 ===
1. The New Gods by Rebecca Levene and Gareth Roberts
  April 2001, 2 episodes
2. The Deadliest Species by Gary Russell
  September 2001, 3 episodes
3. The Ghosts of Mendez by Austen Atkinson
  January 2002, 3 episodes
4. The Sign of Diolyx by Mike Tucker and Robert Perry (two discs)
  May 2002, 3 episodes

=== Series 2 ===
1. A New Atlantis by Nigel Fairs
  April 2003, 3 episodes
2. The Power of Fear by Steve Lyons
  June 2003, 3 episodes
3. The Curse of Kaavan by Nigel Fairs
  August 2003, 3 episodes
4. Alone by Nigel Fairs
  June 2004, 3 episodes

=== Series 3 ===
1. The Slarvian Menace by Mark Wright
  October 2004, 3 episodes
2. The Warlock's Dance by Cavan Scott
  October 2004, 3 episodes
3. A Living Hell by Nigel Fairs
  February 2005, 3 episodes
4. Trigonometry by Gary Russell
  March 2005, 3 episodes

=== Series 4 ===
1. Saying Goodbye by Nigel Fairs
  August 2005, 3 episodes
2. The Lords of Forever by Craig Hinton
  October 2005, 3 episodes
3. Queen of Slarvos by Nigel Fairs
  January 2006, 3 episodes
4. A Plague of Dreams by Jim Mortimore (two discs)
  April 2006, 6 episodes

=== Series 5 ===
1. A Broken Song by Nigel Fairs
  June 2006, 3 episodes
2. Aftermath by Joseph Lidster
  August 2006, 1 episode
3. Spiritus Mundi by Craig Hinton
  October 2006, 3 episodes
4. Stemming the Tide by Helen Goldwyn
  December 2006, 3 episodes
5. End of Silence by Alex Crowe
  February 2007, 3 episodes
6. Rachel by Nigel Fairs
  April 2007, 2 episodes

=== Proposed titles for Series 6 ===
Series six was cancelled part way through the production of Saving the World, Talking to God and Tandem. These episodes will not be released through official channels. Originally scheduled for release from August 2007 to January 2008.

1. Saving the World by Nigel Fairs
2. Talking to God by Nigel Fairs
3. War of the Slarvians by Cavan Scott and Mark Wright
4. Tandem by Helen Goldwyn
5. Godwin's Law by Joseph Lidster
6. Buartek by Nigel Fairs

=== Proposed titles for Series 7 ===
A planned seventh series would have seen Cavan Scott and Mark Wright replace Nigel Fairs as series producers, with the stories taking place a few years after the events of Series 6 in order to act as a reboot.

1. The Next Stage by Cavan Scott and Mark Wright
2. Kalki Reborn by Nigel Fairs
3. The Modern Children by Paul Magrs
4. The Screaming Planet by Iain McLaughlin and Claire Bartlett
5. TIM by Joseph Lidster
6. The Scream of Sogguth by Cavan Scott and Mark Wright

== DVD releases ==
The original series was released on DVD in both region 1 and 2. All eight series of the original 1970s series were released on DVD through Revelation Films in the UK. All discs are Region 0 and are playable in most countries where PAL is the standard. In 2005, A&E TV Home Entertainment (under license from THAMES, talkbackTHAMES and FremantleMedia International) released three boxsets for North America, in the NTSC format, that contain all eight seasons and the documentary "Beyond Tomorrow".

The 1990s series was released as a 5-DVD set but only in region 2 in September 2005.
