= The Deadliest Species =

Big Finish Productions audio drama
- Series: The Tomorrow People
- Release no.: 2
- Featuring: John, Elena, Paul, TIM, Stephen
- Written by: Rebecca Levene & Gareth Roberts
- Directed by: Gary Russell
- Produced by: Gary Russell; Jason Haigh-Ellery
- Executive producer(s): Stephen Cole
- Production code: ?
- Length: 64 mins
- Release date: September 2001
- Preceded by: The New Gods
- Followed by: The Ghosts of Mendez

The Deadliest Species is a Big Finish Productions audio drama based on the British science fiction television series The Tomorrow People.

== Synopsis ==
Homo Superior - the next stage of human evolution. Young people with super powers, dedicated to safeguarding planet Earth. From their secret laboratory deep beneath the streets of London, aided by their super-computer TIM, they watch and wait for others like themselves - and guard against threats to all mankind. They are the Tomorrow People.

The Galactic Federation is at war with the rapacious Sorson Empire, and losing. Two Federation ambassadors, negotiating a peace treaty, have been kidnapped by the Sorsons. One, however, has escaped, and joined forces with the anti-Sorson rebellion on the planet Desh. From there, he heads back home, to Earth, and his friends John and TIM of the Tomorrow People, pursued by the vengeful Sorsons.

The ambassador in question is Stephen Jameson, one of the first Tomorrow People. But can the Deshian rebel he has befriended be trusted? Or are the secrets she carries more deadly than even Stephen realises?

== Plot ==
Part 1: Written on the Tablets of Eternity

Part 2: Unrighteous Deeds

Part 3: The Price to be Paid at Last

== Cast ==
- John - Nicholas Young
- Elena - Helen Goldwyn
- Paul - Daniel Wilson
- TIM/Timus - Philip Gilbert
- Stephen - Peter Vaughan-Clarke
- Hollos - Lisa Bowerman
- Sorsons - Roy Skelton
