= The Ghosts of Mendez =

Audio drama

Big Finish Productions audio drama
- Series: The Tomorrow People
- Release no.: 3
- Featuring: John, Elena, Paul, TIM
- Written by: Austen Atkinson
- Directed by: Jason Haigh-Ellery
- Produced by: Gary Russell; Jason Haigh-Ellery
- Executive producer: Stephen Cole
- Production code: ?
- Length: 67 mins
- Release date: January 2002
- Preceded by: The Deadliest Species
- Followed by: The Sign of Diolyx

The Ghosts of Mendez is a Big Finish Productions audio drama based on the British science fiction television series The Tomorrow People.

== Synopsis ==
Homo Superior - the next stage of human evolution. Young people with super powers, dedicated to safeguarding planet Earth. From their secret laboratory deep beneath the streets of London, aided by their super-computer TIM, they watch and wait for others like themselves - and guard against threats to all mankind. They are the Tomorrow People.

In the heart of London a new art gallery is under construction using revolutionary designs by radical architect Cordelia Mendez. Georgie, an old friend of John's, has been overseeing the gallery's construction and invites him to see it. But when disaster strikes, John is forced into action to save the lives of the construction workers - dragging the Tomorrow People into far greater danger...

For John's heroics come to the attention of a reporter who has his own agenda - and some very unscrupulous acquaintances.

Can John keep the existence of the Tomorrow People a secret from the general public? And can he help a friend in need...?

== Plot ==
Part 1: Building Rites

Part 2: Truth or Dare

Part 3: Promethian Fire

== Cast ==
- John - Nicholas Young
- Elena - Helen Goldwyn
- Paul - Daniel Wilson
- TIM - Philip Gilbert
- Georgie - Sarah McGuiness
- Mike - Jeremy James
- Jack - Mark Wright
- Phillips - Mark Brailsford
- Mendez - Sophie Crichton
- Gestalt - Mark Wright
- Caine - Maggie Stables
