= Antonia Pemberton =

British actress (1927–2026)

- Born: Antonia Joyce Hall; 1927; Margate, Kent, England
- Died: 6 February 2026 (aged 98–99)
- Occupation: Actress
- Years active: 1965–2007
- Spouse: Bryan Stanion (m. 1965, divorced) John Frances Pemberton (m. 1946; div. 1956)
- Children: 1

Antonia Joyce Pemberton (née Hall; 1927 – 6 February 2026) was a British actress known for portraying mothers, ladies, aunts, aristocrats on her work in theatre, television, and film.

== Early life and career ==
Pemberton was born in Margate, Kent, England in 1927. She developed an early interest in acting and pursued training in drama, later appearing in repertory theatre across Britain. Her stage foundation prepared her for a career that would balance both screen and theatre work.

Pemberton's career began in the 1960s with appearances in television dramas such as Reluctant Bandit (1965), where she played Angelina. She gained wider recognition in the 1970s with roles in Microbes and Men (1974) as Marie Pasteur, and in Enemy at the Door (1978–1980), portraying Olive Martel across 22 episodes. Her film breakthrough came with David Lean’s A Passage to India (1984), in which she played Mrs. Turton, a role that brought her international attention. She continued to appear in numerous British television series, including Agatha Christie’s Poirot (1991) as Lady Chatterton, Lovejoy (1993) as Mrs. Normington, Crime Traveller (1997) as Lady Hawkins, and The Shadow in the North (2007) as Miss Walsh. Other TV Shows and films includes The Bill, Doctors, Rosemary & Thyme, Peak Practice, Behaving Badly, Bergerac, Z‐Cars, Within These Walls, Doomwatch and many more.

In addition to screen work, Pemberton remained active in theatre. She performed in Alan Ayckbourn's House + Garden at the Stephen Joseph Theatre in Scarborough, sharing the stage with Janie Dee and Sabine Azéma.

== Personal life and death ==
Pemberton was married twice, first to Bryan Stanyon, with whom she had a daughter, Gemma and later to John Francis Pemberton.

Pemberton died on 6 February 2026.

== Filmography ==
- The Shadow in the North (2007) – Miss Walsh
- Doctors (2002–2007) – Phyllis Clinton/Margaret Mills
- The Bill (1986–2006) – Aunt Peg/Rose Kay/Lizzy
- Rosemary & Thyme (2003) – Frances Caldecott
- Peak Practice (1998) – Lilian Wilson
- Noah's Ark (1997) – Miss Fitzroy
- Crime Traveller (1997) – Lady Hawkins
- Under the Hammer (1994) – Dorothy Entwhistle
- Lovejoy (1993) – Mrs. Normington
- Poirot (1991) – Lady Chatteron
- Behaving Badly (1989) – Trudy
- On the Black Hill (1988) – Mrs. Bickerton
- All Passion Spent (1986) – Mabel
- A Passage to India (1984) – Mrs. Turton
- Who Dares Wins (1984)
- Sharma and Beyond (1984) – Myrna
- Bergerac (1984) – Betty Osman
- Number 10 (1983) – Mrs. Baldwin
- Crown Court (1975–1982) – Mary Daly / Winifred Horton
- Muck and Brass (1982) – Maud
- Little Lord Fauntleroy (1980) – Dawson
- Enemy at the Door (1978–1980) – Olive Martell
- Angels (1979) – Cecily Thorton
- Home Before Midnight (1979) – W.P.C. Wilding
- A Divorce (1976)
- Z-Cars (1968–1975) – Myra Easton/Mary Adams
- Village Hall (1975) – Dorothy Melford
- Within These Walls (1975) – Miss Troy
- Microbes and Men (1974) – Marie Pasteur
- New Scotland Yard (1972–1974) – Renee Morgan/Mrs. Possee
- Shoulder to Shoulder (1974) – Dr. Margaret Bell
- Doomwatch (1972) – Joan Fulton
- Dr. Finlay's Casebook (1970) – Mrs. March
- The Further Adventures of the Musketeers (1967) – Madame de Beauvais
- Reluctant Bandit (1965) – Angelina
