= The Tomorrow People (American TV series) =

American television series

- Genre: Science fiction; Drama
- Based on: The Tomorrow People by Roger Price
- Developed by: Greg Berlanti; Phil Klemmer; Julie Plec
- Starring: Robbie Amell; Peyton List; Luke Mitchell; Aaron Yoo; Madeleine Mantock; Mark Pellegrino
- Composer: David E. Russo
- Country of origin: United States
- Original language: English
- No. of seasons: 1
- No. of episodes: 22

Production
- Executive producers: Greg Berlanti; Phil Klemmer; Julie Plec; Danny Cannon; Thom Beers; Tony Optican
- Producers: Peter Schindler; Gordon Mark
- Production locations: New York City (pilot); Vancouver (series)
- Editors: Mark C. Baldwin; Tirsa Hackshaw; Anthony Miller; Nathan Draper
- Running time: 43 minutes
- Production companies: Berlanti/Plec; FremantleMedia North America; CBS Television Studios; Warner Bros. Television

Original release
- Network: The CW
- Release: October 9, 2013 – May 5, 2014

The Tomorrow People is an American science fiction drama television series developed by Greg Berlanti, Phil Klemmer, and Julie Plec which aired on The CW during the 2013–14 American television season. It is a remake of the original British television series of the same name, created by Roger Price, which ran from 1973 to 1979. The series follows a group of young people who possess psionic powers as the result of human evolution.

The Tomorrow People premiered on October 9, 2013 and ended on May 5, 2014. It originally aired Wednesdays at 9:00 p.m. Eastern/8:00 p.m. Central, but on March 17, 2014, it was moved to Mondays at 9:00 p.m. Eastern/8:00 p.m. Central. On May 8, 2014, The CW cancelled the series after one season.

== Premise ==
The Tomorrow People are humans who, as a result of evolutionary development, have become early instances of the next state of human evolution – Homo superior. However, while they are early examples of their particular human subspecies, they are not the first such generation to have developed such abilities; the oldest Homo superior appear to have started to emerge 30–40 years earlier. They exist across the world. In young adulthood, they develop psionic abilities (the "Three T's" – Telepathy, Teleportation and Telekinesis. A fourth T ability featured in the series is Temporal Manipulation).

The series focuses on Stephen Jameson, a newly emergent member of the Tomorrow People. Stephen's father, the most powerful of the Tomorrow People, disappeared years before the current events in the series while trying to find a place where they could live safely.

The Tomorrow People are hunted by Ultra, an anti-telepath genetic cleansing organization that uses Tomorrow People to hunt down others and neutralize, or kill, them; their headquarters are designed to neutralize the powers of Tomorrow People, although Stephen seems resistant to its effects. Outside Ultra, their parents, and their loved ones, the existence of the Tomorrow People is unknown to the general public, as they fear greater persecution. Consequently, they spend much of their time in the Lair, a subterranean base of operations beneath the streets of Manhattan.

== Cast and characters ==
=== Main ===
- Robbie Amell as Stephen Jameson, who suddenly experiences the onset of psionic abilities, realizing he is of a different human species. He is also a synergist: a second-generation telepath whose parents are both Homo superior. After joining the Tomorrow People, he joins their enemy Ultra as a double agent in order to take the evil group down. He quits Ultra after he found them trying to hunt Astrid down but soon agrees to continue working there. He was in a romantic relationship with Hillary until her death. At the end of the series, he becomes the Tomorrow People's latest leader.
- Peyton List as Cara Coburn, one of the Tomorrow People who encountered her own psionic abilities five years prior to the series, when she was a deaf girl who was attacked by a teenaged boy, which caused her to accidentally kill him when using her powers. She was in a relationship with John. She has now been elected the leader of the Tomorrow People. When questioned who she would risk everything for, her answer was John. While she still loves him, she also has a strange bond with Stephen.
- Luke Mitchell as John Young, leader of the Tomorrow People. He was in a relationship with Cara. He was also a former Ultra agent and Jedikiah's favorite protégé, and comes from a highly dysfunctional family background. Later voted out of his position as leader, then thrown out of the Tomorrow People group by Cara. Unlike other Tomorrow People, Ultra's Annex Project gave him the ability to kill deliberately as opposed to accidentally. He later bonds with Astrid Finch after she pulled the bullet out of him and it is later revealed that Cara is jealous. At the end of the series, he has temporarily lost but then regained his abilities, but has once more become a pawn of Jedikiah Price, former leader of anti-telepath organization Ultra.
- Aaron Yoo as Russell Kwon, another member of the Tomorrow People. He fled his strict, overbearing Korean father and a prospective career as a prodigy concert pianist to become a petty thief. Later after cheating at various casinos, he gained a partner in crime "Talia", whom he turned in after she stole his money to begin a life of super heroism. How he first came in contact with the Lair is unknown but he is John's best friend.
- Madeleine Mantock as Astrid Finch, Stephen's best friend and a 'Sap' (member of the species Homo sapiens). She learns about Stephen's powers and the world of the Tomorrow People, which soon puts her in danger. She has a close bond with Stephen and after nearly being killed twice, develops a close bond with John, who helps her get over her fears.
- Mark Pellegrino as Jedikiah Price, Stephen's uncle, an evolutionary biologist and anti-telepath zealot who is head of Ultra. He was in love with a Tomorrow Person, Morgan, with whom he has fathered a (as yet unborn) child. However Jedikiah has a love/hate relationship with John Young, his former student whom he sees as a son, like John sees him as a father. Despite having tried to kill John numerous times, Jedikiah still cares for him, but later recruits John as the core of a new organization at the end of the series.

=== Recurring ===
- Sarah Clarke as Marla Jameson, wife of Jack/Roger and Stephen's mother. It is revealed that she is also an older first-generation Tomorrow Person which explains her son's rare ability to stop time like her husband, Jack, as well as his intensified psionic abilities relative to other, first-generation Tomorrow People like John, Cara, and Russell.
- Jacob Kogan as Luca Jameson, Marla's son and Stephen's brother. He was suspected of being a Tomorrow Person like his brother Stephen, but was revealed to just be smoking cannabis.
- Jeffrey Pierce as Jack Jameson/Roger Price, Stephen's father and Jedikiah's brother. He left Stephen's family when Stephen was a child. It is confirmed in the eighth episode that he had been shot by John after he was ordered to by Jedikiah, and in the fourteenth episode was found cryogenically frozen. He worked with Jedikiah and the Founder to create Ultra.
- Alexa Vega as Hillary Cole, Ultra agent and one of Stephen's partners who has an initially adversarial but later romantic relationship with him. In the twentieth episode, she betrays Ultra and blows herself up with a bomb which is triggered by a phone call from Astrid to kill the Founder. Before doing this she told Stephen how much she loved him.
- Meta Golding as Darcy Nichols, Ultra agent and one of Stephen's partners. In the sixth episode, it is revealed that she has a sister named Piper, however after betraying Ultra, she is shot dead.
- Nick Eversman as Kurt Rundle, he robbed a bank with his powers, in an effort to support his mother. Later he joined the others in the Lair. However due to a threat on his mother he betrayed them to an Ultra attack. In response an enraged Cara removed his abilities with Ultra's "Cure".
- Mitchell Kummen as John Young as a child
- Dan Stevens as TIM (voice only), the Tomorrow People's artificial intelligence, originally stolen from Ultra by John and now currently resident in the Tomorrow People's lair, actively assisting in coordinating their retrieval and recovery of other Tomorrow People from apprehension and murder by Ultra and its henchmen.
- Madeleine Arthur as Charlotte Taylor (A child telepath. Charlotte was experimented on at "The Citadel", an anti-telepath prison, but is later rescued by the Tomorrow People.) She appears to be closest to John.
- Ben Hollingsworth as Agent Troy
- Carly Pope as Morgan Burke, Jedikiah's girlfriend who is a Tomorrow Person and in the sixteenth episode, it is revealed that she is pregnant with his child.
- Nicholas Young as Aldus Crick, a scientist who worked with Roger Price on researching the abilities of Homo superior. He was killed by Ultra. Nicholas Young played John in the original 1973–1979 series.
- Serinda Swan as Cassandra Smythe, the Founder's daughter and a powerful synergist. Her father used her as a guinea pig for unknown experiments. She was accidentally killed by the Founder when he used his telekinesis to deflect a bullet that was meant for him.
- Simon Merrells as Hugh Bathory, better known as "the Founder". An extremely powerful and experienced Tomorrow Person, mysterious head of Ultra, father of Cassandra Smythe and considered a monster. At the end of the series, he disappears into a vortex caused by the malfunction of a time stasis apparatus.
- Leven Rambin as Natalie, a troublemaking telepath with no love for "Saps". Later, she becomes a coldblooded Ultra operative and tries to murder Cara, but is prevented by Stephen's newly disclosed time reversal abilities, which stop the event from ever happening.
- Laura Slade Wiggins as Irene Quinn, a 17-year-old Tomorrow Person and geneticist.

== Episodes ==
No.	Title	Directed by	Written by	Original release date	Prod. code	US viewers (millions)
1	"Pilot"	Danny Cannon	Teleplay by : Phil Klemmer	October 9, 2013	296845	2.32
Stephen Jameson is an 18-year-old teen living in New York City who has been waking up in different places and doesn't know why, until a young woman named Cara Coburn tells him that he isn't a member of homo sapiens or baseline, non-telepath humanity. Stephen is a member of the human subspecies homo superior, a telepath, or, as they're known informally, one of 'the Tomorrow People'. Cara takes him to an underground facility, an old subway station, where Stephen meets John Young and Russell Kwon, as well as a small band of people of his species. An artificial intelligence supercomputer, known as TIM, runs the facility while John is the de facto leader of the group. John has his doubts about Stephen, but Cara and the others believe Stephen can bring the Tomorrow People to a place where they can be safe from their enemy, Ultra. Jedikiah, who turns out to be Stephen’s uncle, runs Ultra, an anti-telepath organization. Things turn around when Stephen decides to work for his uncle, in order to find out what happened to his father. Stephen also discovers a surprising unique power that no one knew of, the ability to manipulate time.
2	"In Too Deep"	Danny Cannon	Story by : Greg Berlanti & Phil Klemmer; Teleplay by : Phil Klemmer & Jeff Rake	October 16, 2013	2J7952	2.15
Stephen is working for Ultra as a double agent for the Tomorrow People. John doesn't trust Stephen, but Cara believes Stephen can bring their people to safety. His first mission is to bring in a paranormal named Kurt, who has robbed a bank by telekinetically controlling a security guard. Stephen learns that Ultra wants to kill Kurt instead of neutralizing his powers. Stephen feels wrong being part of genocide, having also learned in the previous episode that his kind cannot commit murder. They manage to save Kurt from Ultra, while Stephen undergoes his first debriefing by a strong telepath who could learn everything about the Tomorrow People and their secret hideout. With help from Cara, he shields his mind from her, but at the cost of his Ultra partner's life. With the missions becoming more dangerous, Stephen wants to quit, but John is beginning to trust him. John believes Stephen should stay at Ultra and work from the inside and report back all of the organization's moves to them.
3	"Girl, Interrupted"	Danny Cannon	Micah Schraft & Pam Veasey	October 23, 2013	2J7953	1.92
Stephen meets his new partner, a fellow homo superior named Darcy Nichols, and Ultra tries to develop his new power of stopping time. Meanwhile, the Tomorrow People come up with an idea to get inside Ultra's mainframe with Stephen's help. They are successful but Cara's past gets into her head and endangers the mission. The mainframe pulls out a name of a paranormal. They try to find her but it turns out to be a trap with Cara being captured. Jedikiah asks Stephen to neutralize Cara's powers, which Ultra believes he had done successfully, but instead he stops time and gives her a harmless saline injection instead. While at a party, Stephen telepathically overhears a classmate, Emily, contemplating suicide but is not allowed to help humans as it will expose their powers. Instead, Cara intervenes and talks her out of suicide, without exposing her powers. Stephen's human best friend, Astrid, saw him teleporting and confronts him. Cara's past is revealed: five years ago she was a deaf, socially excluded teenager who accidentally killed a boy her age. The boy had attacked her, and she discovered her powers defending herself. She could suddenly hear and was able to escape police custody and talk to her father, who gave her money to run away. She said goodbye to her younger sister and left forever.
4	"Kill or Be Killed"	Guy Bee	Nicholas Wootton & Alex Katsnelson	October 30, 2013	2J7954	1.72
Killian McCrane (Jason Dohring), an ex-agent of Ultra who worked alongside John has returned to destroy him. Killian is different from the others because he is able to kill. Killian tests him in order to determine if he is a worthy adversary by detonating 6 bombs all at once. John successfully deactivates the bombs using teleportation. Meanwhile, Jedikiah is invited to family dinner by Marla, Stephen's mother, in order to find out what job her son is doing for Jedikiah, which she suspects is the same way her husband was involved with him. John agrees to meet with Jedikiah, who informs him they should have a temporary cease-fire to work together to find Killian. John and Killian battle in a parking garage, but Jedikiah betrays the Tomorrow People and sends in a kill squad to kill both. John teleports them to the woods, and John shoots Killian dead, after informing Killian that the reason why he left Ultra was because he too was also made to be a killer.
5	"All Tomorrow's Parties"	Nick Copus	Leigh Dana Jackson & Grainne Godfree	November 6, 2013	2J7955	1.56
On the advice of Irene, another Tomorrow Person within their Lair who is an adept geneticist, Cara asks Stephen to obtain some of the 'cure' serum that Ultra uses to strip away their powers to use to create an antidote, which he is able to do. Jedikiah is ordered to bring Stephen in to meet his superiors. Stephen is shocked to discover that one of them, a man known as 'the Founder', is a Tomorrow Person. The Founder attempts to search his mind, leaving Stephen unsure as to how much dangerous information he discovered. Meanwhile, Cara and Russell attempt to get John to lower his guard enough to let them have a night out of fun, to leave their underground hideout just for a little while, but everything goes awry when they are betrayed by one of their own. A fight breaks out in which Irene is shot and badly injured. John shoots one of the enemies, revealing his ability to kill. Cara is shocked, he has never shared it with her. It turns out Kurt had betrayed the Tomorrow People, after Ultra threatened his mother. Incensed, Cara uses the 'cure' serum to strip away Kurt's powers, even after Stephen tells her it is hard to come by and that he is not worth it. After a traumatic night, Astrid, having followed Stephen once again into a possibly dangerous situation, confronts him at home, forcing Stephen to finally show her just what he's been hiding from her.
6	"Sorry for Your Loss"	Nathan Hope	Jeff Rake & Ray Utarnachitt	November 13, 2013	2J7956	1.65
Russell is informed by TIM that his father has died, and John joins him on his journey home for the funeral in order to avoid speaking to Cara about the secret he had revealed. Part of Russell's background story is shown; he was a child prodigy pianist under the tutelage of his stern father. Meanwhile, Stephen and Cara are tracking down a new Tomorrow Person named Piper, who is found to be the younger sister of Darcy Nichols, Stephen's partner at Ultra. While tracking down Piper, Stephen and Cara begin an affair, and Jedikiah is also in an affair himself with none other than another Tomorrow Person, Morgan. Stephen takes Darcy to meet her sister, the new paranormal, but they are discovered by Ultra and Darcy is killed in the ensuing battle. Piper chooses to remain with the Tomorrow People in the Lair. Stephen and Cara reveal their previously hidden feelings for each other and teleport to a hotel room where they have sex with each other.
7	"Limbo"	Félix Alcalá	Nicholas Wootton & Micah Schraft	November 20, 2013	2J7957	1.70
Cara and Stephen discuss the previous events of the night whilst Stephen reveals his excitement for the prospect of something happening between the two, Cara admits hesitation of a relationship due to her still present feelings for John. A bad time begins for Stephen as he begins to misuse his powers for personal gain. He uses his powers to cheat in basketball games, and throws a wild party at his house. During this point he reads Astrid's mind and finds out she is in love with him. Cara admits her affair with Stephen to John, who then retaliates by embarrassing Stephen at his basketball game. Jedikiah puts a wristband onto Stephen nullifying his powers. Now Stephen is powerless against a psychotic rogue telepath who has been victimizing women with his abilities and a vision from Stephen's father, Roger, appears to Stephen while he is close to dying.
8	"Thanatos"	Rob Bailey	Story by : Greg Berlanti & Phil Klemmer; Teleplay by : Phil Klemmer & Alex Katsnelson	December 4, 2013	2J7958	1.74
After being discovered breaking into Jedikiah's home for more information on "Thanatos", Russell inadvertently teleports both himself and Jedikiah to the Lair, the Tomorrow People's underground hideout, potentially compromising their position when the Founder uses a team of telepaths to locate him. Cara and Russell attempt to locate Jedikiah's girlfriend Morgan in an attempt to make him explain what Thanatos is. It is revealed that John shot Stephen's father at Jedikiah's command and believes him to be dead.
9	"Death's Door"	Leslie Libman	Story by : Greg Berlanti & Phil Klemmer; Teleplay by : Pam Veasey & Leigh Dana Jackson	December 11, 2013	2J7959	1.44
John has been captured by Ultra in a further attempt to uncover the whereabouts of the Tomorrow People. Cara again seeks out Jedikiah's girlfriend Morgan in an attempt to trade hostages, only for Jedikiah to request that she join the Tomorrow People in hiding. Jedikiah's affair has been brought to the attention of the Founder and Jedikiah is forced into a difficult situation. Stephen's mother reveals a box with research notes by his father and Professor Aldus Crick (Nicholas Young), who were attempting to reach "Limbo" by simultaneously teleporting while stopping time. Stephen tracks down and meets Aldus Crick where the elderly professor tells Stephen that, after more than hundreds of attempts at "Limbo", the results proved unsuccessful. Before Stephen can ask Crick anything more, the Founder has Crick killed. Stephen becomes determined to reach "Limbo" the place he previously found himself in when close to death, but will he survive another near-fatal experience?
10	"The Citadel"	Eagle Egilsson	Jeff Rake & Grainne Godfree	January 15, 2014	2J7960	1.46
The Tomorrow People learn about an escapee from The Citadel; an anti-telepath prison in which Ultra tortures and experiments on captured telepaths. Errol (Ty Olsson), a very powerful telepath, escapes and Stephen takes a bullet from John to keep his cover at Ultra as Errol is rescued. John admits to the Tomorrow People that he killed Roger, and they depose him and then elect Cara as their new leader. With the help of Errol, Cara leads a rescue team into the Citadel to break out some of the captives. Errol is killed by Jedikiah while protecting Cara and a young girl named Charlotte. Both escape, after Jedikiah shoots Errol. Stephen learns that a man "Simon Plame", who was meant to protect his father's body, is dead. Jedikiah informs him that he himself killed the man and then cremated Roger's body; however, the truth of his claim is in question. Stephen's mother has a new boyfriend named Peter and Stephen tries to read his mind, only to have Peter somehow block his telepathy.
11	"Rumble"	Nick Copus	Nicholas Wootton & Ray Utarnachitt	January 22, 2014	2J7961	1.38
Julian Masters — a sadistic Tomorrow Person who gets a thrill from almost violating the effects of the prime barrier, is back in town and out to grab the attention of Cara, who was once associated with him and his girlfriend. Ultra is also on the hunt for Julian while training new recruits who have to make the cut as agents or have their powers removed. As Stephen is one of them, he clashes with a new recruit, Hillary, who is determined to do things her own way and not as a team member. Meanwhile, down in the Lair, Charlotte is having nightmares about The Citadel, and is impulsively emitting painful violent telepathic charges affecting everyone in the vicinity. Cara later finds a way to use her attacks against Julian. Russell is beaten nearly to death by Julian and his gang after discovering that he plans to terrorize an entire apartment complex in a blatant act of hate. Astrid's safety is seriously compromised after Hillary witnesses Stephen teleport her away.
12	"Sitting Ducks"	Dermott Downs	Phil Klemmer & Micah Schraft	January 29, 2014	2J7962	1.72
Hillary informs Jedikiah about Astrid in an attempt to gain prestige within Ultra and Stephen finds out that Peter is taking his mother and brother away on a camping trip, making Stephen anxious about his intentions. John volunteers to protect Astrid because of a personal experience he suffered fourteen years ago, when Ultra killed an old comic book vendor, a human friend of John's, after John revealed his powers to him. Astrid is nearly assassinated by Ultra before John rescues her and takes a bullet saving her life. However, time is running out as John cannot teleport them away from the scene without regaining his strength. Cara rescues both of them; however, Astrid must stay with the Tomorrow People underground or risk Ultra coming after her. Meanwhile, Stephen takes a drastic measure in an attempt to force Peter's hand, a serious mistake, before he realizes that it may be in fact his brother Luca who is breaking out as a Tomorrow Person.
13	"Things Fall Apart"	Michael Schultz	Alex Katsnelson & Leigh Dana Jackson	February 5, 2014	2J7963	1.39
Cassandra Smythe, a newly discovered and exceptionally powerful paranormal, has been robbing banks and leaving the money to get herself on Ultra's grid. Out of disgust at Ultra's attack on Astrid, Stephen quits. However, the Founder makes a deal directly with Stephen: Astrid's freedom, for Stephen to capture Cassandra and bring her to him. During the conversation, the Founder reveals that Cassandra is his daughter. Stephen captures Cassie and brings her instead to the Lair first. During a pseudo-interrogation, Cara discovers that Cassie was experimented on by the Founder and an Ultra doctor. After overhearing Jedikiah and Stephen speak about Astrid, Stephen's mother Marla goes directly to Ultra and threatens the entire organization with exposure if Astrid is not safe. Stephen is caught by the Founder after he attempts to investigate the room Cassie was experimented in. John goes against Cara's orders and takes Cassie to Ultra in a bid to rescue Stephen and preserve the only hope of the Tomorrow People, which lies with him. In response, Cara expels John from the lair, in an attempt to ensure the others will follow orders. Stephen chats with Luca to discover if he is breaking out, but instead finds that he was experimenting with drugs. The Founder goes back on his word and sends a kill Squad after Astrid. Stephen races to the rescue and finds out that his mother is also a Tomorrow Person.
14	"Brother's Keeper"	Guy Bee	Jeff Rake & Grainne Godfree	February 26, 2014	2J7964	1.49
After recent events, Jedikiah makes a deal with Stephen so that he can keep working at Ultra. Stephen, unimpressed with Cara's recent actions, invites John to stay at his house after Cara expelled him from the lair. What seems to be a Tomorrow Person with the ability to kill turns out to be a twin hit squad, one human and the other a Tomorrow Person. Jedikiah wants to get his hands on the both of them to conduct a dangerous, torturous experiment of transferring of the abilities of homo superiors to homo sapiens. It doesn't go the way as Jedikiah planned after Cara arms one of the twins in an attempt to assassinate Jedikiah once and for all. Disappointed that Cara would go as far to hire an assassin, John declines her offer to return under the impression that she only wants another assassin at her call. Marla and Stephen come to an understanding about their shared situation. Jedikiah, unbeknownst to anyone else, has the body of his brother Roger/Jack cryogenically frozen in an underground room, and shares what may be a private agenda.
15	"Enemy of My Enemy"	Steven A. Adelson	Phil Klemmer & Ray Utarnachitt	March 5, 2014	2J7965	1.24
Julian Masters returns to enact his revenge upon Cara and the others in the Lair. He teleports directly into Ultra headquarters in order to make a deal with Jedikiah concerning the discovery of the Lair. In order to ensure this deal, Jedikiah has an explosive implanted into his head and gives him a deadline of eighteen hours in which to complete this task. Astrid has isolated herself at home, missing school and avoiding going outside. John helps her to confront her fear and rise above it. Meanwhile, Charlotte goes out to find John and is captured by Julian who painfully extracts the location of the Lair from her. John returns to the Lair and prepares to rescue Charlotte alone, but Julian is closing in on the Lair with an Ultra kill-squad. In the end, however, it is Julian and the kill-squad who are wiped out as Cara, John, Stephen and Russell trap them in a small space and the explosive implant detonates. Russell rescues Charlotte before Ultra can return her to the Citadel. Soon after John and Cara get back together, Stephen finds another invention of his father's which, as TIM puts it, 'seems to rather like him'.
16	"Superhero"	Dermott Downs	Micah Schraft & Alex Katsnelson	March 17, 2014	2J7966	1.17
Ultra gets another fix on a paranormal who is playing 'superhero' with her abilities and leaves a calling card – a red rose. Russell suspects this to be a woman he was involved with named Talia in Las Vegas who wanted to use her powers to rescue humans. He and Stephen discover that in fact, the woman is one of Talia's followers, a Tomorrow Person named Mallory, who is one of many 'Scarlet Avengers' who use their abilities to help people. Meanwhile, Morgan meets up with Jedikiah in an attempt to search his head for the location of Rogers body. Her cover is blown and John teleports in and saves her life, telling Jedikiah that Morgan is pregnant. Things escalate when Russell and Mallory stop a serious hostage situation at a courthouse and are detected by Ultra's surveillance network. With a little help from the other Tomorrow People, they escape, and the elusive Talia returns briefly to tell Russell to be great. Against her better judgment, Hillary kisses Stephen. After Cara's probe of John's memories gives Stephen a strong lead, Stephen uses his father's invention and locates Roger's body, along with Jedikiah who was waiting for him the entire time, aware of his deception.
17	"Endgame"	Jace Alexander	Nicholas Wootton & Anderson MacKenzie	March 24, 2014	2J7967	0.78
Stephen ventures into dangerous territory as he makes a deal with Jedikiah to kill Bathory, the Founder. For this suicide mission, Stephen breaks Bathory's daughter Cassandra out of the Citadel and makes a plan with John, the only living Tomorrow Person who can deliberately kill. Meanwhile, Cara senses a new paranormal more intimately than usual. The new paranormal turns out to be the sister she left behind when she became a fugitive. Sofie is a sensitive teenager who is training to be a ballet dancer, and she cannot take the hardcore life of concealment and persecution the Tomorrow People lead. The desperation of their situation leads to a surprising and risky close alliance with Jedikiah, who is allowed to enter the Lair and use TIM to tamper with the security system in the Founder's home. Upon breaking into the Founder's house and being about to pull off the assassination successfully, the Founder gives an argument that Jedikiah is untrustworthy, convincing enough to distract Stephen from having John kill him immediately. Cassie urges John to shoot Bathory in the middle of his account, but Bathory accidentally deflects the bullet into his own daughter's body and kills her. In light of these disastrous events, Jedikiah flees Ultra, and the Founder gives relentless pursuit after him. Tensions rise and tides have turned, but just what is this machine that the Founder wanted to use on Stephen's father Roger/Jack, and possibly on Stephen himself?
18	"Smoke and Mirrors"	Dermott Downs	Jeff Rake & Leigh Dana Jackson	March 31, 2014	2J7968	1.10
Stephen becomes highly disillusioned after Bathory the Founder seems to change priorities to non lethal measures at Ultra. To test the validity of the founders word Stephen and Hillary track a paranormal who is using his power for a street magician's act. Meanwhile, Jedikiah on the run forces a confrontation between Stephen and his brother Luca forcing Stephen to reveal his power to him. In response Stephen attempts to kill Jedikiah but is unable due to the prime barrier. The Founder meanwhile captures the paranormal and begins what looks as if he is about to remove his power, but instead injects a tracer in him. Jedikiah out of options asks John for help in reviving Roger who is the only one who really knows the truth. However, Cara becomes worried that the Tomorrow People are going to lose Stephen on account of his affair with Hillary only getting deeper. The Founder introduces Stephen to the Machine he says will take their kind to the "Refuge" out of his ability for manipulating time. As Stephen gets another vision from his father in Limbo, Jedikiah is monitoring the whole event with great anxiety.
19	"Modus Vivendi"	Oz Scott	Ray Utarnachitt & Grainne Godfree	April 14, 2014	2J7969	1.06
Jedikiah breaks into Ultra in a failed attempt to destroy the Founders mysterious machine. The Founder puts Stephen through a rigorous training session to get better control over his abilities so that he will be ready to use it. Meanwhile, the Founder declares the pretense that the shadow war is "over" and wines and dines Russell while Cara attempts to read Hillary's mind for hidden intentions, only to reach a disappointing dead end. John and Jedikiah fend off an Ultra tactical team that discovers Roger's body and they are forced to take him out of his cryogenic state. As Roger's life is in danger, John gets help from Marla to get the bullet out of Roger, while Stephen and Hillary use the Founder's Machine to lead his father out of Limbo. Roger survives and is expected to recover; however, it seems that Hillary is a double agent. She is reporting back to the Founder about these events, and as the Founder points out, this is only another step in his overall plan.
20	"A Sort of Homecoming"	John Behring	Jeff Rake & Alex Katsnelson	April 21, 2014	2J7970	0.76
Roger revives and makes a full recovery, but before he makes any other plans he goes to spend time with Stephen, Marla and those he left behind. Meanwhile, with no one else aware of her divided loyalties, Hillary is still reporting to the Founder, who is now aware that Roger is alive. Roger and Jedikiah break into Jedikiah's old apartment to recover information on the Founder's Machine and its actual purpose. It is disclosed that the machine utilizes the effects of stopping time to turn off the life cycle of normal humans making it extremely easy for any Tomorrow Person to violate the prime barrier and kill any non-telepath. Roger and Stephen attempt to break into Ultra to destroy the machine. However, John intervenes in an attempt to redeem himself for his past killing of Roger and takes Rogers place in the plan. In the process, John falls into the trap that Bathory originally intended for Roger. Hillary's duplicity is revealed as she warns Stephen, and Stephen takes his mother Marla and his brother Luca into the Lair for protection. Natalie, a rebellious anti-Sap homo superior creates a schism within the Lair, and some of the Tomorrow People turn themselves into Ultra in the hope that they will find the Refuge. Meanwhile, the Founder injects John with the psi-negating serum, and John suffers a massive telepathic feedback that surprises even the Founder. Hillary is shocked and horrified at the Founder's actions and turns against him. Acting out of her love for Stephen, she makes the ultimate sacrifice and places herself in the middle of an explosion that she hopes will kill Bathory with her. (Note: The incidental music during the first scene of this episode, where Roger is being resuscitated, is a re-orchestrated version of the theme tune of the original 1970s British TV series).
21	"Kill Switch"	Dermott Downs	Micah Schraft & Leigh Dana Jackson	April 28, 2014	2J7971	0.93
The Founder survives the bomb, albeit scarred. He sends a powerless John back to the Lair to send Cara a message. Bathory reveals that his tracking serum has a lethal kill switch, and after demonstrating his resolve he promises to kill another Tomorrow Person each hour. Anti-"Sap" telepath Natalie is causing further division within the ranks of the Lair. Marla breaks Jedikiah out of an institution to cooperate with Irene in developing a counter agent against the Founder's device. John meanwhile seeks the company of Astrid who opens his eyes to the fact that it was not his power that made him distinctive, but his courage. Irene and Jedikiah find out that the serum works by sending an electromagnetic signal into the brain's cerebellum, and Tim reveals that the signal is coming from a government facility. Stephen and Cara make a successful attempt to cut the signal at its source but to no avail. Natalie and Russell have betrayed Roger and have handed him over to the Founder. Roger prepares for his ordeal within the machine and everyone awaits the end. Irene is found unconscious and when the others find her, she discloses a worrying turn of events. Jedikiah has finally narrowed down the gene template of homo superior and has artificially broken out. He has considerable psionic abilities, but he seems to be using them without any concern for those around him.
22	"Son of Man"	Wendey Stanzler	Phil Klemmer	May 5, 2014	2J7972	1.01
Jedikiah forces his way into Ultra with his abilities in an effort to stop the time stasis apparatus. When his powers fail him, Roger begs Jedikiah to shoot him. Unfortunately, despite Roger's death, it is not enough to stop the time stasis machine, which has now become fully active. Grief stricken by the permanent loss of his father, Stephen goes looking for the Annex project, the same procedure which left John a killer and able to override the inbuilt prime barrier against doing so. Stephen finds out that the Annex project was not deactivated as everyone else thought. Natalie storms into the Lair, bringing an Ultra kill squad. Russell saves Cara's life, and Natalie joins Bathory's side. The Founder's machine is fully activated, sending a time stasis wave across a wide radius. Cara and Russell distract Ultra's personnel as John and Astrid provide sniper fire. The Founder enters the room that the time stasis machine is within, and a confrontation ensues. Disclosing more psionic abilities, Stephen is able to absorb the energy from the apparatus, and a vortex opens. Stephen expels the Founder and the time stasis machine into the vortex. Natalie later makes a successful attempt at killing Cara. However, Stephen reverses time and prevents that event from occurring. Two weeks later, the Tomorrow People's underground lair becomes overcrowded, and Stephen moves them into Ultra's old headquarters. Meanwhile, Jedikiah makes John a highly unethical offer. John will have no memory of Cara, Russell or Astrid. Jedikiah talks about beginning a new organization and with John as his manipulable new super soldier.

== Reception ==
=== Critical response ===
The Tomorrow People received mixed reviews, scoring a 50 out of 100 on the review aggregator Metacritic.

=== Ratings ===
The pilot episode was watched by a total of 2.96 million viewers.

Viewership and ratings per episode of The Tomorrow People
No.	Title	Air date	Rating/share (18–49)	Viewers (millions)
1	"Pilot"	October 9, 2013	0.9/2	2.31
2	"In Too Deep"	October 16, 2013	0.8/2	2.15
3	"Girl, Interrupted"	October 23, 2013	0.7/2	1.92
4	"Kill or Be Killed"	October 30, 2013	0.6/1	1.72
5	"All Tomorrow's Parties"	November 6, 2013	0.6/2	1.56
6	"Sorry for Your Loss"	November 13, 2013	0.6/2	1.65
7	"Limbo"	November 20, 2013	0.6/2	1.72
8	"Thanatos"	December 4, 2013	0.6/2	1.74
9	"Death's Door"	December 11, 2013	0.5/1	1.44
10	"The Citadel"	January 15, 2014	0.5/2	1.46
11	"Rumble"	January 22, 2014	0.5/1	1.38
12	"Sitting Ducks"	January 29, 2014	0.7/2	1.72
13	"Things Fall Apart"	February 5, 2014	0.5/1	1.39
14	"Brother's Keeper"	February 26, 2014	0.5/1	1.49
15	"Enemy of My Enemy"	March 5, 2014	0.4/1	1.24
16	"Superhero"	March 17, 2014	0.4/1	1.17
17	"Endgame"	March 24, 2014	0.3/1	0.78
18	"Smoke and Mirrors"	March 31, 2014	0.5/1	1.10
19	"Modus Vivendi"	April 14, 2014	0.3/1	1.06
20	"A Sort of Homecoming"	April 21, 2014	0.3/1	0.76
21	"Kill Switch"	April 28, 2014	0.4/1	0.93
22	"Son of Man"	May 5, 2014	0.4/1	1.01

=== Accolades ===
The Tomorrow People was nominated for "Best Youth-Oriented Series on Television" at the 40th Saturn Awards.

== Bibliography ==
- Davidson, Andy (2022). Jaunt. A Viewer's Guide to the Tomorrow People. London. Ten Acre Films. ISBN 978-1-908630-97-1
