= Connie Booth =

American writer and actress (born 1940)

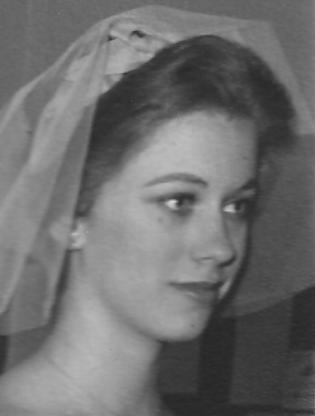
- Booth in 1968
- Born: December 2, 1940 (age 85); Indianapolis, Indiana, U.S.
- Occupations: Actress; writer; psychotherapist
- Years active: 1968–1995
- Spouses: John Cleese (m. 1968; div. 1978) John Lahr (m. 2000)
- Children: 1
- Relatives: Bert Lahr (father-in-law), Ed Solomon (former-son-in-law)

Connie Booth (born December 2, 1940) (Note: There is speculation about Booth's birth year. Sources have also indicated 1939, 1941, and 1944.) is a retired American actress and writer. She has appeared in several British television programmes and films, including her role as Polly Sherman on BBC Two's Fawlty Towers, which she co-wrote with her then-husband John Cleese. In 1995, she left acting and worked as a psychotherapist until her retirement.

== Early life ==
Booth was born Constance Booth Bollinger in Indianapolis, Indiana, on December 2, 1940. Her father Elmer Edward Bollinger was a Wall Street stockbroker and her mother Virginia Caylor Bollinger was an actress. The family, which included Connie's elder brother Conrad Booth Bollinger, later moved to New York State. Booth entered acting and worked as a Broadway understudy and waitress. She met John Cleese while he was working in New York City; they married on February 20, 1968.

== Acting career ==
Booth appeared in How to Irritate People (1968), a pre–Monty Python film starring Cleese and other future Python members; she went on to secure parts in episodes of Monty Python's Flying Circus (1969–74) and in the Python films And Now for Something Completely Different (1971) and Monty Python and the Holy Grail (1975, as a woman accused of being a witch). She starred in a German episode of Monty Python, playing the princess, and appeared in a short film entitled Romance with a Double Bass (1974), which Cleese adapted from a short story by Anton Chekhov; and The Strange Case of the End of Civilization as We Know It (1977), Cleese's Sherlock Holmes spoof, as Mrs. Hudson.

Booth and Cleese co-wrote and co-starred in Fawlty Towers (1975 and 1979), in which she played art student and chambermaid Polly. For thirty years, Booth declined to talk about the show until she agreed to participate in a documentary about the series for the digital channel Gold in 2009.

Booth played many other roles on British television, including Sophie in Dickens of London (1976), Mrs. Errol in a BBC adaptation of Little Lord Fauntleroy (1980), and Miss March in a dramatisation of Edith Wharton's The Buccaneers (1995). She also starred in the lead role of a drama called The Story of Ruth (1981), in which she played the role of the schizophrenic daughter of an abusive father. In 1994, she played a supporting role in "The Culex Experiment", an episode of the children's science fiction TV series The Tomorrow People.

Booth also had a stage career, primarily in the London theatre, appearing in ten productions from the mid-1970s through the mid-1990s, including starring with John Mills in the 1983–1984 West End production of Little Lies at Wyndham's Theatre.

== Psychotherapy career ==
Booth ended her acting career in 1995. After studying for five years at the University of London, she began a career as a psychotherapist, registered with the British Psychoanalytic Council.

== Personal life ==
In 1971, Booth and Cleese had a daughter, Cynthia. Booth and Cleese divorced in 1978 before the second series of Fawlty Towers was finished and aired.

Booth married John Lahr, author and former New Yorker senior drama critic, in 2000.

== Selected filmography and theatrical appearances ==
=== Television ===
Year	Show	Role	Notes
1968	How to Irritate People	Various characters	Television film
1969–1974	Monty Python's Flying Circus	Various characters	
1972	Dickens of London	Sophie	
1975, 1979	Fawlty Towers	Polly Sherman	Also co-creator and writer
1978	Off to Philadelphia in the Morning	Jane Parry	Television drama
1980	Why Didn't They Ask Evans	Sylvia Bassington-ffrench	Television film
1981	Worzel Gummidge	Aunt Sally II	Television film
1982	The Deadly Game	Helen Trapp	Television film
1983	The Hound of the Baskervilles	Laura Lyons	Television film
1984	Nairobi Affair	Mrs. Gardner	Television film
1985	Past Caring	Linda	
1986	Bergerac	Monica McLoed	Episode: "Winner Takes All"
1987	The Return of Sherlock Holmes	Violet Morstan	Television film
1990	Wizadora	Wizadora	Pilot episode
1994	The Tomorrow People	Doctor Lucy Connoe	Episode: "The Culex Experiment"
1995	The Buccaneers	Miss March	Final role

=== Film ===
Year	Show	Role	Notes
1971	And Now for Something Completely Different	Various characters	
1974	Romance with a Double Bass	Princess Costanza	
1975	Monty Python and the Holy Grail	The Witch	
1977	The Strange Case of the End of Civilization as We Know It	Mrs Hudson / Francine Moriarty	
1980	Little Lord Fauntleroy	Mrs Errol	
1981	The Story of Ruth	Ruth	
1987	84 Charing Cross Road	the Lady from Delaware	
1988	High Spirits	Marge	
1988	Hawks	Nurse Jarvis	
1991	American Friends	Caroline Hartley	
1992	Leon the Pig Farmer	Yvonne Chadwick	

=== Theatre ===
Year	Play	Role	Theatre
1973–1974	Design for Living	Helen Carver	Phoenix Theatre, London
1977	The Glass Menagerie		Cambridge Arts Theatre
1982–1983	Little Lies	Agatha Posket	Wyndham's Theatre
1984	Cat on a Hot Tin Roof		Royal Exchange Theatre
1985–1986	Edmond		Royal Court Theatre
1986	The Women	Mary	National Theatre Studio, Royal National Theatre
1988	An Enemy of the People	Katrine Stockmann	Young Vic
1990–1991	The Manchurian Candidate	Eugenie Cheyney	New Vic Theatre
1991–1992	It's Ralph		Comedy Theatre
1992–1993	Under the Stars		Greenwich Theatre
