= Mike Holoway =

British musician and actor (born 1961)

- Born: Michael Holoway; 28 January 1961 (age 65)
- Occupations: Actor, musician

Mike Holoway (born 28 January 1961) is a British musician and actor. He was the drummer and percussionist in Flintlock and at the same time became an actor, notably featuring in the TV series The Tomorrow People.

== Early life ==
Mike Holoway was born on born 28 January 1961.

== Career ==
At ten, he made his first TV appearance with the band Young Revivals, two years later changing their name to Flintlock. From the age of 12, Holoway appeared in the cult TV show The Tomorrow People science fiction series. Comprising Mike Holoway, Derek Pascoe, John Summerton, Bill Rice, and Jamie Stone, Flintlock made numerous TV appearances on programmes such as Blue Peter, Magpie, You Must Be Joking, Pauline's Quirkes, Fanfare, and Top of the Pops.

From 1985, Holoway toured in Joseph and the Amazing Technicolor Dreamcoat, playing Joseph, a role he reprised until 2006, totalling more than 4,000 performances spanning a 24-year period.. Holoway was Paul Shane’s musical director and is also credited as playing mouth organ on Culture Club’s song Karma Chameleon. He was also an extra on Wham’s Last Christmas and sang backing vocals.

== Discography ==
Flintlock:

Solo singles:

- "Overnight" (June 1981)
- "Come Go With Me" (November 1981)
- "Here I Am" (August 1983)
- "Don't Let Life Get You Down" (November 1983)
- "Tides of Love" (February 2018)

Solo albums:

- Fun City (1990)
- In the Heat of the Moment (1991) (re-issued as Fun City on CD)
