= Romance with a Double Bass =

1974 British short comedy film

- DVD cover
- Directed by: Robert Young
- Written by: John Cleese; Connie Booth; Robert Young
- Screenplay by: Bill Owen
- Based on: "Romance with a Double Bass" by Anton Chekhov
- Starring: John Cleese; Connie Booth; Graham Crowden; Freddie Jones
- Music by: Leon Cohen
- Release date: 1974
- Running time: 41 minutes
- Country: United Kingdom
- Language: English

Romance with a Double Bass is a 1974 British short comedy film directed by Robert Young and starring John Cleese and Connie Booth. It was adapted by Young, Cleese and Booth (uncredited) from a screenplay by Bill Owen based on the short story of the same name by Anton Chekhov.

== Plot ==
Smychkov, a bassist, shows up too early for the ball of a beautiful princess, and decides to spend his extra time skinny dipping in the nearby lake. The princess, meanwhile, has gone fishing at the lake. Smychkov fastens a bouquet of flowers to her line, but unfortunately, this causes the line to get caught, so she strips off her clothes to untangle it. A thief absconds with both Smychkov's and the Princess's clothes, and while the Princess is wandering around stark naked, she stumbles on the hut where Smychkov is hiding. After their initially embarrassing encounter, he tries to help her return to the villa by hiding her in his bass case.

== Cast ==
- Connie Booth as Princess Constanza
- John Cleese as musician Smychkov
- Graham Crowden as Count Alexei
- Desmond Jones as musician Razmakhaikin
- Freddie Jones as maestro Lakeyich
- Jonathan Lynn as leader of the orchestra
- John Moffatt as majordomo
- Terry Nelson as thief
- Kathie O'Donoghue as Princess' maid
- Dennis Ramsden as Prince Bibulov
- Andrew Sachs as musician Zhuchkov
- June Whitfield as Prince Bibulov's wife

== Production ==
The movie marked John Cleese's first collaboration with the director Robert Young (they would later work on Splitting Heirs (1993) and Fierce Creatures (1997)). The cast also included Andrew Sachs who would work with Cleese and Booth in Fawlty Towers the following year.

Romance with a Double Bass was filmed during October 1974 and took ten days to shoot. Filming took place in southern England, with scenes shot in the Double Cube Room of Wilton House, Wiltshire and the Somerley estate, Hampshire.

== Release ==
The movie was shown in theatres in 1975 along with The Eiger Sanction by Clint Eastwood.

It was released on video in 1995.

== Critical response ==
The Monthly Film Bulletin wrote:

Despite the nineteenth-century Russian dress and a plot with a distant debt to Chekhov, the source of this movie's predominantly whimsical comedy is much closer to home. Chekhov's affectionate, closely observed social satire has been replaced with the stock antics of a British nudist-camp romp (a squealing blonde, a male bare bottom, and a suggestive but strategically placed instrument case), and the familiar comic convention that, thrown together in a crisis, the aristocracy and the working-class both behave with poker-faced aplomb. Retaining the verbal mannerisms of the Monty Python films (Princess: "Don't kill me!" Smychkov: "Oh" – pause – "all right"), John Cleese proves, under a director capable of restraining his self-indulgence, not only a physically striking comic but one with a nicely timed delivery too. There is something inherently funny about shifting large musical instruments (think of Laurel and Hardy and the piano on the swaying Alpine bridge in Swiss Miss [1938]); and the spectacle of the naked Cleese in a wet top hat lugging a naked blonde in an instrument case by stages across picturesque countryside, and then rushing back to collect his double-bass, is sustained and authentic comedy. The verbal gags are on the whole less effective, and are not improved by being mostly relegated to throwaway asides: June Whitfield, the Princess' mother, fussing about the late arrival of the strawberries, mutters distractedly, "Cream alone is very unexciting". It is probably too much to expect that a whimsical comedy made with a measure of style will do as well these days as the current crop of lamentable but money-spinning British sex comedies – but one can hope.

Time Out described the movie as a "very funny, innocent and tastefully filmed nudist romp".

David Sterritt wrote that while "the plot is slender, it makes very funny jokes at the expense of class and gender hierarchies".

David Cornelius of DVD Talk praised the movie as a "wonderful, sweet, and often riotous celebration of life" that combines "playful physical comedy and whimsical nature of the love story that unfolds with a smile".

Paul Shrimpton of The Spinning Image also called it "surprisingly innocent and naive" despite Cleese and Booth spending most of the time naked; he also praised their performances "scattered with typical Cleese lunacy here and there".
