= Flintlock (band) =

British musical group

- Also known as: The Young Revivals
- Origin: Essex, England, UK
- Genres: pop
- Years active: 1960s–1980, 2007
- Past members: Derek Pascoe; Mike Holoway; Jamie Stone; John Summerton; Bill Rice; Shirley White; Miles Ridding; Steve Sams; Jimmy Edwards

Flintlock were a 1970s pop group from Essex, England. Its members were Derek Pascoe (vocals/saxophone, born 20 October 1957), Mike Holoway (drums/percussion, born 28 January 1961), Jamie Stone (bass/vocals, born 29 September 1957), John Summerton (guitar/vocals, born 8 January 1961) and Bill Rice (keyboards, born 3 October 1957). Their only song to chart in their native country was "Dawn", which peaked at number 30 in 1976.

== Career ==
The group began under the name The Young Revivals, but after two years changed their name to Flintlock. The band was formed by Summerton and Holoway. The earliest version of the band included a female member (role in the band unknown) called Shirley White and a bass player called Miles Ridding. After seeing another band playing that included Derek Pascoe and Jamie Stone, John and Mike asked them to join the band, and Shirley and Miles parted ways. Soon after, they hired Bill Rice on keyboards. After a concert in the early 70s, they were approached by Roger Price, who had been in the audience. He liked how they played and asked them to be on television.

They came to national attention in the mid-1970s through regular appearances on the British children's television programmes You Must Be Joking and Pauline's Quirkes, the latter hosted by the actress Pauline Quirke. Flintlock also appeared on programmes such as Blue Peter, Magpie and Top of the Pops, and their own programme Fanfare.

Holoway also became known as an actor in the children's cult TV drama programme The Tomorrow People, in which Flintlock made a guest appearance in the Series 5 story The Heart of Sogguth. As a result of the band having a one-hit wonder status and having many television appearances to their name, Summerton has described Flintlock as a "TV band", comparing them to The Monkees.

Flintlock had one Top 30 hit single in the UK Singles Chart, "Dawn", in the summer of 1976. The song peaked at number 30 on the UK singles chart.

Four studio albums were released between 1975 and 1979. For the fourth and final album (Stand Alone, released in February 1979), vocal problems caused Derek Pascoe to play a more instrumental role. His place on lead vocals was taken by Jimmy Edwards (born 18 April 1949). Edwards had been a friend of the band since producing and composing some of the material on the band's early recordings. He had been a solo artist recording under the name James Arthur Edwards for Pinnacle Records during 1976 before fronting New Wave band Masterswitch. He would return to a solo career in 1979, making records as Jimmy Edwards & The Profile for Warner Bros through 1979 before fronting Sham 69.

After two small tours of Japan in 1980 as a five-piece, Flintlock disbanded. According to Summerton, the main reason for the band's sudden end was due to the rise of punk music.

A one-off reunion concert took place in 2007.

=== After Flintlock ===
The four studio albums released by Flintlock between 1975 and 1979 were re-released as a box set in 2022. An accompanying booklet brought the story of the band and the subsequent careers of its members up to date.

Mike Holoway released a couple of solo singles for Bell Records during 1981. He then concentrated upon his acting career and had a long career in musical theatre, including spells as Joseph in Joseph and the Amazing Technicolor Dreamcoat in London's West End. In early 2018, Holoway announced the impending release of a new 13-track album. The lead single, "Tides of Love", was released on 9 February 2018.

Derek Pascoe moved to Australia and played saxophone in various jazz/experimental projects, as well as teaching. He was described as being "among the leading free improvisers in Adelaide" by the Australian Music Centre. His daughter Sara (born 1981) is a comedian and actor.

John Summerton went on to play guitar and sing for The Rubettes until at least September 2020, then Gerry's Pacemakers (2022), and subsequently joined Herman's Hermits as vocalist and guitarist, where he remains as of July 2024.

Jamie Stone in 2022 was heading a global cyber-security company, while Bill Rice was working in IT.

Jimmy Edwards died on 13 January 2015, aged 65.

== Discography ==
=== Singles ===
- "Learn to Cry" (August 1975)
- "A Little Bit of Lovin'" (February 1976)
- "Dawn" (April 1976) (UK Peak 30)
- "Sea of Flames" (July 1976)
- "Russian Roulette" (November 1976)
- "Carry Me" (March 1977)
- "Anything for You" (September 1977)
- "Mony Mony" (February 1978)
- "(Hey You) You're like A Magnet" (January 1979)

Three further singles were released in Japan:

- "Amorous Lady" (1977)
- "Taken All Away" (1978)
- "Get With The Boys" (1979)

=== Albums ===
- On the Way (December 1975)
- Hot from the Lock (December 1976)
- Tears 'n' Cheers (October 1977)
- Stand Alone (February 1979)

A greatest hits album was also released in Japan and Germany.
