= Sammie Winmill =

British actress (born 1948)

- Born: Janice Winmill; Bognor Regis, Sussex, England
- Occupation: Actor
- Years active: 1970–present

Sammie Winmill (born Janice Winmill c1950) is a British actress who had a number of roles in the 1970s, and is best known for portraying Carol in the Sci-fi series The Tomorrow People.

== Career ==
Her first noted appearance was alongside Ronnie Barker in the comedy Futtock's End in 1970. Following small roles with Frankie Howerd in the films of Up Pompeii and Up the Chastity Belt (1971) she secured a regular part in the sitcom Doctor in Charge in 1972 playing Nurse Sandra Crumpton. This role ran for six episodes of the first series. Soon after she appeared as Gretel in the 1972 film The Pied Piper starring Donovan.

In 1973 she was offered the role of Carol in a new children's science-fiction series, The Tomorrow People. Winmill played the role throughout the thirteen episodes of the first series but declined to continue in the part, despite being offered a three-year contract. This was mainly due to her fear of being typecast and wanting to do more stage work, although the actress now believes that she quit the role too early.

Winmill went on to do much theatre work over the next few years before landing another regular television role in The Duchess of Duke Street in 1976. She played the part of Ethel for eleven episodes until 1977. She also appeared in an episode of The Professionals, but by the early 1980s she had decided to retire from the industry.

Over the next few years, Winmill became involved in other activities such as folk singing (she also plays guitar) and joined the Template Foundation. She also organises drama and dance workshops specifically for women with an emphasis on spiritual well-being. In the late 1990s she made a return to acting, appearing in a one-woman show which she wrote herself and starred in a number of science-fiction audio drama CDs.
