= Derek Pascoe =

British vocalist and saxophonist

- Born: 20 October 1957 (age 68)
- Genres: Pop; jazz
- Instruments: Vocals; saxophone
- Formerly of: Flintlock

Derek Pascoe (born 20 October 1957) is a British musician now based in Adelaide, South Australia. He was the vocalist and saxophonist in pop band Flintlock in the 1970s. He was a member of the jazz performance academic staff of the Elder Conservatorium of Music and has collaborated with a number of musicians in musical and spoken word performances.

== Biography ==
Pascoe trained as a saxophonist from the age of 15, after being inspired by a performance on television. He was the vocalist and saxophonist in Flintlock (previously known as the Young Revivals).

He appeared as himself in the children's TV comedy series You Must Be Joking! and in every episode of Pauline's Quirkes (with Pauline Quirke) in 1976. Flintlock played cover versions of a variety of songs in both series. He appeared in a two-part episode of the children's science fiction programme The Tomorrow People, "The Heart of Sogguth" in 1977, in which the band's music was used to revive an ancient demon.

After leaving Flintlock and losing interest in pop music, he began to study and practise jazz.

In 2007 he was noted for his performance at the Tyndall Assembly, a concert series directed by Tristan Louth-Robins in Adelaide in which he collaborated with experimental composer Luke Harrald.

He played sax in the spoken word/impro outfit Max-Mo, formed in 2009.

Pascoe was a member of the Jazz Performance academic staff of the Elder Conservatorium of Music (teaching saxophone, improvisation and small ensemble in 2011 and still a lecturer in 2017, but as of May 2020 does not appear on the staff list.

Pascoe is the father of writer, stand-up comedian and actress Sara Pascoe.

== Collaborations ==
Among his many collaborations, he joined The Shaolin Afronauts and other collaborators on Quest under Capricorn. After a performance at the Adelaide Festival Centre, the album was released on 6 July 2012 on Freestyle Records. The group reprised their Quest under Capricorn performance at The Gov as part of the Umbrella: Winter City Sounds festival in July 2017.

== Recognition ==
In 2009, the Australian Music Centre described Pascoe as "among the leading free improvisers in Adelaide, whose rigorous approach to musical self-discipline gives a profound assurance to his rare extended solo public performances".
