= Peter Vaughan-Clarke =

British actor (1957–2023)

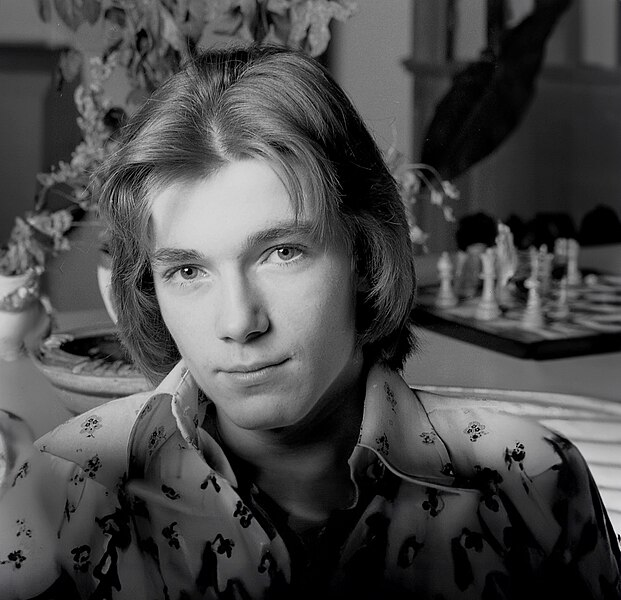
- 2024
- Born: Peter Vaughan Clarke; 11 June 1957; Wandsworth, London, England
- Died: 7 August 2023 (aged 66)
- Occupations: Actor, key grip
- Years active: 1972–1980
- Notable work: The Tomorrow People

Peter Vaughn Clarke (11 June 1957 – 7 August 2023), known professionally as Peter Vaughan-Clarke, was a British actor.

Vaughan-Clarke is best known for his portrayal of Stephen Jameson in the TV series The Tomorrow People in the 1970s, a character he returned to later in life in the audio continuation of the series by Big Finish Productions, most notably in the episode "Trigonometry". He also appeared on TV in The Pallisers, Shoestring (as "Fred"), The Duchess of Duke Street (as "Jamie"), and in the 1975 British film It Could Happen to You (a.k.a. Intimate Teenage Secrets), along with his Tomorrow People co-star Nicholas Young.

After retiring from acting, Vaughan-Clarke worked as a lighting technician and key grip. He died on 7 August 2023, at the age of 66.
