= Elizabeth Adare =

English television actor

Elizabeth Adare (born 3 June 1949 in Newcastle upon Tyne, Northumberland) is an English child psychologist and former actress and television presenter during the 1970s and 1980s.

Her most prominent role was as Elizabeth in the 1970s science fiction television series The Tomorrow People. Other TV credits include: Mind Your Language ("An Inspector Calls"), Crossroads, Within These Walls, Rising Damp, Angels, Father, Dear Father, The Expert, Enemy at the Door, Mitch, The Setbacks and Rumpole of the Bailey.

== Career ==
Elizabeth Adare was born in 1949 in Newcastle upon Tyne, Northumberland, England, of African immigrant parents from Sierra Leone where she was brought up until 1957. Always wanting to follow her family tradition of becoming a school teacher, she took up acting as a hobby before attending the Mountview Drama School. She made her stage debut in Zigger Zagger in 1967 with the National Youth Theatre. She worked in repertory theatre in Glasgow and Coventry and also with the National and Young Vic Theatres.

Adare had many walk-on parts and other small roles in television before featuring in an episode of The Expert for the BBC in 1971. Most notably she appeared in the science-fiction stage play "Time Sneeze" and in the feature films Father, Dear Father (1973) and A Nightingale Sang in Berkeley Square (1979).

In 1973, she landed the part of Elizabeth M'Bondo in the series The Tomorrow People which ran until 1979 and it became her most famous role. Adare also appeared in Within These Walls for London Weekend TV as well as 11 episodes of Crossroads. After The Tomorrow People series ended in 1979, Adare hosted About Books for Thames TV. And later appeared as Phillip's girlfriend in an episode of Rising Damp.

In 1983, Adare quit acting to settle down with her husband and child, took a new career as a child therapist and she now works as the head of a busy social services department in central London.
