= Bryan Stanyon =

British actor

- Born: c.1941 Leicester, England
- Occupations: Theatre, Radio & television actor
- Years active: 1959- 1977
- Works: The Tomorrow People; Stranger in the House

Bryan Stanyon, also known as Bryan Stanion (born c.1941), is a British actor with a career spanning from the 1960s through the late 1970s. He graduated from RADA with an honours diploma, having won the Bossom Prize for diction and the William Powell prize for Shakespeare.

He worked in several repertory companies and played Hamlet twice at Dundee and Coventry.

He was in Peter Brook’s original production of the Marat/Sade with the RSC at the Aldwich Theatre and Fenton in The Merry Wives.

He was in the Belgrade Theatre production of Semi-Detached which transferred to the Music Box Theatre in New York.

His only film performance was in Stranger in the House with James Mason and Geraldine Chaplin.

On television he was best known for his portrayal as Professor Cawston in the British science fiction serial The Tomorrow People. Stanion’s character was one of the few recurring roles for a non-regular character in the series.

While filming The Tomorrow People and playing Steve in A Streetcar Named Desire at the Piccadilly Theatre, he decided the acting was no longer what he wanted to do, and, when the run ended, started as a trainee social worker at his local Braintree office.

He remained in social work until his retirement, working mostly in mental health and children’s services.

== Radio ==
Stanion spent his early career in radio, playing Dusty Rhodes in The Archers when he was 16. Later as "Tom Midway" in the 1964 BBC radio show "Repertory in Britain", in the segment "Semi-Detached". In 1967, Stanyon played the voice role of "Peter" in the radio show "Thirty Minute Theatre". In 1970, he starred as "Teddy" in the Afternoon Theatre production of "Stay Where You Are".

== Film and television ==
One of Stanyon's more well known roles is that of Professor Cawston, in The Tomorrow People, in which Stanyon portrays a professor of psionics who occasionally assists the homo superiors known as the Tomorrow People. Stanyon's first appearance was in the Tomorrow People serial "A Rift in Time", in which his character was first introduced. The serial aired in the spring of 1974, with Stanyon returning to the same role a year later for the serial "Secret Weapon", co-starring Trevor Bannister as an evil Colonel attempting to use the Tomorrow People as spies in the Cold War. Later that year, Stanyon appeared in his final serial of the Tomorrow People, in "Revenge of Jedikiah".

Other works include the 1967 film Stranger in the House, a 1967 production of Henry IV as well as roles in the productions of Child Marlene, and the 1972 production Wine and Retribution.

From 1973 to 1977, Stanyon appeared as a judge in the British series Crown Court.

== Personal life ==
Stanion/Stanyon was born in Leicester. After retiring from acting, he became a social worker.
