= Little Lord Fauntleroy (1980 film) =

- DVD cover
- Directed by: Jack Gold
- Screenplay by: Blanche Hanalis
- Based on: Little Lord Fauntleroy; 1886 novel by Frances Hodgson Burnett
- Produced by: Norman Rosemont
- Starring: Ricky Schroder; Alec Guinness; Eric Porter; Colin Blakely; Connie Booth
- Cinematography: Arthur Ibbetson
- Edited by: Keith Palmer
- Music by: Allyn Ferguson
- Production company: Norman Rosemont Productions
- Distributed by: G.T.O Films Ltd.
- Release dates: 25 November 1980 (United States); December 1980 (United Kingdom)
- Running time: 103 minutes
- Country: United Kingdom
- Language: English
- Budget: $6 million

Little Lord Fauntleroy is a 1980 British family drama television film directed by Jack Gold and adapted by Blanche Hanalis from Frances Hodgson Burnett's 1886 children's novel of the same name. The film stars Alec Guinness, Ricky Schroder, Eric Porter, Connie Booth, and Colin Blakely.

== Plot synopsis ==
Young Cedric 'Ceddie' Errol and his widowed mother live in genteel poverty in 1870s New York after the death of his father. He was the favorite son of Cedric's grandfather, the Earl of Dorincourt, because the other two were wastrels and weaklings. But the Earl has long ago disowned his son for marrying outside the aristocracy. Cedric's two best friends are Mr. Hobbs the grocer (a Democrat and anti-aristocrat) and Dick Tipton the bootblack.

After his other two sons die, leaving Cedric the heir apparent to the earldom, Lord Dorincourt sends Mr. Havisham, his lawyer, to America to bring Cedric to Britain. Havisham is authorized to buy expensive gifts for Cedric, but the boy chooses to buy an engraved gold watch for Hobbs and enable Dick to buy out his drunken partner.

Mrs. Errol accompanies her son, but is not allowed to live at Dorincourt castle nor meet the Earl, although she will receive a house and a large allowance. She does not tell Cedric of his grandfather's bigotry. The Earl's lawyer is impressed with the young widow's dignity and intelligence, especially after she begins to take care of the poor living on the land.

Cedric is most grateful that his grandfather, albeit unintentionally, enabled him to help his friends, and thinks he is a kind man. This soon wins the heart of his stern grandfather. All his tenants and nearby villagers are also taken by him, especially as he inspires his grandfather to be more caring about his tenants. Slowly thawing, the Earl hosts a grand party to proudly introduce his grandson to British society, notably his formerly estranged sister, Lady Constantia Lorridaile. Lady Constantia is impressed with both Cedric and his mother.

After the party, Havisham tells the Earl that Cedric may not be the heir. An American dancer calling herself Minna Errol has approached him, insisting that her son Tom is the offspring of her late husband, the Earl's second son, Bevis. Heartbroken, the Earl is forced to accept her apparently valid claim. Minna proves to be uneducated and openly mercenary.

However, Dick recognizes Minna from her newspaper picture, as the former wife of his brother Ben, Tom's real father. They travel to the United Kingdom, confront Minna and thus disprove her claim.

The overjoyed Earl apologizes to Cedric's mother and brings her to live with the delighted Cedric on his estate. The small family has a festive Christmas dinner with all their friends and servants.

== Cast ==
- Ricky Schroder as Cedric Errol, Lord Fauntleroy
- Alec Guinness as John Arthur Molyneux Errol, Earl of Dorincourt
- Connie Booth as Mrs. Errol, Cedric's mother
- Eric Porter as Mr. Havisham, Dorincourt's solicitor
- Colin Blakely as Silas Hobbs, Cedric's friend
- Rachel Kempson as Lady Lorradaile, Dorincourt's sister
- Carmel McSharry as Mary, Mrs. Errol's substantive
- Antonia Pemberton as Dawson, Dorincourt's head housekeeper
- Rolf Saxon as Dick Tipton, Cedric's friend
- John Cater as Thomas, the Butler
- Peter Copley as Reverend Muldaur
- Patsy Rowlands as Mrs. Dibble
- Ann Way as Miss Smiff, the village dressmaker
- Patrick Stewart as Wilkins, the riding teacher
- Gerry Cowper as Mellon, the room service
- Edward Wiley as Ben Tipton
- Kate Harper as Minna Tipton
- Tony Melody as Mr. Kimsey
- Rohan McCullough as Lady Grace
- Dicon Murray as Georgie
- Ballard Berkeley as Sir Harry Lorradaile
- John Southworth as Higgins
- Norman Pitt as Lord Ashbey Delefante
- Bill Nighy as an Officer (uncredited)

== Production ==
Most of the $6 million budget came from International Telephone and Telegraph. Rosemont said: "What people remember about the 1936 version was Freddie Bartholomew. But Bartholomew was British and the whole point about the story is that the boy who inherits the English earldom isn't English at all but a kid from the Lower East Side of New York. So, we open our film with him playing in Hester Street (actually shot in London) and then some 20 pages into the script we take him to England and the castle where he meets for the first time his cantankerous grandfather, the earl... What we do is point up the contrast and dramatize the difference in background and style of living".

== Distribution ==
Little Lord Fauntleroy had its world premiere on television in the United States on 25 November 1980 on CBS and was then released in cinemas in the United Kingdom in December, and a German-dubbed version was first screened in West Germany on 26 December 1982. The film has since become a Christmas classic in Germany, and is broadcast on the national broadcast network Das Erste every year.

== See also ==
- Little Lord Fauntleroy (1921)
- Little Lord Fauntleroy (1936)
- Little Lord Fauntleroy, the book
