= Roger Price (television producer) =

British television producer, director and writer

- Born: Roger Damon Price; 1941 (age 84–85)
- Occupation: Television producer (now retired)
- Years active: 1966–1995
- Notable work: The Tomorrow People, You Can't Do That On Television

Roger Damon Price (born 1941) is a British former television producer, director and writer active in the United Kingdom, Canada, and the United States. He has created children's television series in all three countries.

He created the children's science fiction series The Tomorrow People, Junior Points of View, the British children's sketch variety shows You Must Be Joking! (1974-1976), Pauline's Quirkes (1976) (both of which had Flintlock as their house band) and You Can't Be Serious (1978) for Thames Television, the American sketch comedy Don't Look Now, co-created the pilot episode UFO Kidnapped, the teen sketch comedy Turkey Television and the Canadian sketch comedy You Can't Do That on Television, which became hugely successful on Nickelodeon in the United States.

He collaborated with other producers including Geoffrey Darby and Geraldine Laybourne, the latter of whom would go on to become president of Nickelodeon. He is now retired from the industry and lives in Canada.

It was on You Can't Do That on Television where Darby and Price created and started dumping green slime, which has become an icon of Nickelodeon. In the 1992-1997 The Tomorrow People Roger Price became the executive producer.

== Writing credits ==
Production	Notes	Broadcaster
The Tomorrow People	68 episodes (1973–1979)	ITV
You Must Be Joking!	"Episode #2.1" (1976)	ITV
You Can't Do That on Television	143 episodes (1979–1990)	CTV, Nickelodeon
Don't Look Now	5 episodes (co-written with Geoffrey Darby, 1983)	PBS
Whatever Turns You On	15 episodes (co-written with Geoffrey Darby, 1979)	CTV
UFO Kidnapped	Feature film (co-written with Geoffrey Darby, 1983)	Nickelodeon
Turkey Television	6 episodes (co-written with Geraldine Laybourne, 1985)	Nickelodeon

== Awards and nominations ==
Year	Award	Work	Category	Result	Reference
1987	CableACE Awards	Turkey Television	Children's Programming Special or Series - 9 and Older (with Geoffrey Darby and Adam Bernstein)	Nominated	
