= Philip Gilbert =

Canadian actor (1931–2004)

- Born: Phillip Arthur Joseph Bilodeau; March 29, 1931; Vancouver, British Columbia, Canada
- Died: January 6, 2004 (aged 72); Farnborough, Hampshire, England
- Occupation: Actor

Philip Gilbert (March 29, 1931 – January 6, 2004) was a Canadian actor.

== Background ==
Gilbert was born in Vancouver, British Columbia, and educated at Vancouver College. He was a player with the Rank Organisation, appearing in many films during the 1950s and 1960s.

== TV work ==
Despite his many film roles he was perhaps best known for his role as TIM in the original version of The Tomorrow People from 1973 to 1979. Gilbert returned to play TIM in 2001 for the audio plays produced by Big Finish and continued the role until his death in 2004, starting with The New Gods up to and including The Power of Fear.

He had a broad stage career, starring in such productions as Divorce Me, Darling! in the West End, as well as appearing many times at the Prince Regent Theatre, Farnborough, where he was Head of Drama.

He was represented by Nicholas Young's theatrical agency.

== TV and filmography ==
- Simon and Laura (1955) - Joe
- The Adventures of Quentin Durward (1955) - Louis' Messenger (uncredited)
- Man of the Moment (1955) - Pilot (uncredited)
- Reach for the Sky (1956) - Canadian Pilot / Coltishall II (uncredited)
- Checkpoint (1956) - Eddie
- Account Rendered (1957) - John Langford
- Rock You Sinners (1957) - Johnny Laurence
- Bachelor of Hearts (1958) - Conrad Lewis
- Dentist in the Chair (1960) - young man in the surgery
- The Singer Not the Song (1961) - Phil Brown
- No Love for Johnnie (1961) - Terry Langham (uncredited)
- The Avengers (1961, TV Series) - Jeremy de Willoughby
- Dentist on the Job (1961) - Floor Manager
- Studio Four (1962, TV Series) - Captain
- The Human Jungle (1963, TV Series) - David Branch
- Die! Die! My Darling! (1965) (aka FANATIC) - Oscar
- The Frozen Dead (1966) - Dr Ted Roberts
- George and the Dragon (1966, TV Series) - TV Actor
- Some Girls Do (1969) - Test Co-Pilot (uncredited)
- Sykes: With the Lid Off (guest star for Thames TV broadcast 7 July 1971, TV Movie)
- Till Death Us Do Part (1972) - Golfer
- The Tomorrow People (1973-1979, TV Series) - TIM / Timus / Tikno / the voice of Galactic Federation Biotronic Computers
- Mister Big (broadcast BBC One, 7 January - 11 February 1977 and 30 June - 4 August 1977)
- Citizen Smith (1977, TV Series) - Hotel Manager
- Sherlock Holmes and Doctor Watson (1980, TV Series) - Mr. Brighton
- Superman III (1983) - Newsreader
- Howards' Way (1985, TV Series) - Derek Fielding (final appearance)

== Theatre ==
- Gilbert played "Blue" in Share My Lettuce - at the Lyric Theatre, Hammersmith, from 21 August 1957 and at the Comedy Theatre from 25 September 1957 to 17 May 1958.
