= Nicholas Young (actor) =

British actor (born 1949)

- Born: June 11, 1949 (age 77)
- Occupation: Actor
- Known for: The Tomorrow People (1973-79)
- Notable credits: Crown Court; Kessler; The Tomorrow People (2013); Upstairs, Downstairs

Nicholas John Young (born 11 June 1949) is a British actor. He is most well known for playing the role of John in the 1970s British children's science fiction TV series The Tomorrow People. He played a different role, Prof. Aldus Crick, in the show's 2013 American remake. He also appeared as Franz Hoss in the BBC television series Kessler (1981).

== Career ==
Young was cast as John, the lead role in the ITV children's science fiction series The Tomorrow People in 1973. He was the only cast member (other than Philip Gilbert) to remain with the series for its entirety. The series ended in 1979.

Young's other roles include appearances in Upstairs, Downstairs, Crown Court, and Space: 1999 (in the two-part episode "The Bringers of Wonder").

He had uncredited roles in the films To Sir With Love (1967) and The Day of the Jackal (1973).

Forty years after he starred in the original series, Young had a guest role in the short-lived 2013 US remake of The Tomorrow People as Professor Aldus Crick.

== Filmography ==
Film
Year	Title	Role	Notes
1967	To Sir, with Love	Schoolboy	uncredited
1973	The Day of the Jackal	Foreign Currency Exchange Clerk	uncredited
1975	Three for All	Myron	
1975	Eskimo Nell	Deadeye Dick	
1977	Adventures of a Private Eye	Legs Luigi	
1978	Home Before Midnight	Ray	

Television
Year	Title	Role	Notes
1971	Upstairs, Downstairs	Myles Radford	Episode: "A Cry for Help"
1973-1979	The Tomorrow People	John	68 episodes
1974	Crown Court	Lord Sebastian Carvell	3 episodes
1977	Space: 1999	Peter Rockwell	Episode: "The Bringers of Wonder"
1979	S.O.S. Titanic	Jack Thayer	TV movie, uncredited
1981	Kessler	Franz Hoss	6 episodes
2013	The Tomorrow People	Aldus Crick	2 episodes
