= The Tomorrow People =

British sci-fi television series, 1973–1979

The Tomorrow People is a British children's science fiction television series created by Roger Price. Produced by Thames Television for the ITV Network, the series first ran from 30 April 1973 to 19 February 1979.

The theme music was composed by Australian music composer Dudley Simpson.

In 1992, after having much success with running episodes of the original series in the U.S., Nickelodeon requested Price and Thames Television for a new version to be piloted and filmed at Nickelodeon Studios Florida in April 1992, with Price acting as executive producer. This version used the same basic premise as the original series with some changes and ran until 8 March 1995. A series of audio plays using the original concept and characters (and many of the original series' actors) was produced by Big Finish Productions between 2001 and 2007. In 2013, an American remake of the show premiered on The CW.

== Premise ==
All incarnations of the show concerned the emergence of the next stage of human evolution (Homo novis) known colloquially as Tomorrow People. Born to human parents, an apparently normal child might at some point between childhood and late adolescence experience a process called 'breaking out' and develop special paranormal abilities. These abilities include psionic powers such as telepathy, telekinesis, and teleportation. Their psychological make-up prevents them from intentionally killing others.

== Original series (1970s) ==
The Tomorrow People
- Genre: Fantasy / Drama / Sci-Fi
- Created by: Roger Price
- Starring: Nicholas Young; Elizabeth Adare; Peter Vaughan-Clarke; Philip Gilbert; Stephen Salmon; Sammie Winmill; Dean Lawrence; Mike Holoway; Misako Koba; Nigel Rhodes
- Music by: Dudley Simpson
- Country of origin: United Kingdom
- Original language: English
- No. of series: 8
- No. of episodes: 68 (list of episodes)

Production
- Running time: 30 minutes
- Production company: Thames Television

Original release
- Network: ITV
- Release: 30 April 1973 – 19 February 1979

The original series was produced by Thames Television for ITV. The Tomorrow People operate from a secret base, The Lab, built in an abandoned London Underground station. The team constantly watches for new Tomorrow People "breaking out" (usually around the age of puberty) to help them through the process as the youngsters endure mental agonies as their minds suddenly change. They sometimes deal with attention from extraterrestrial species as well as facing more earthbound dangers with military forces across the globe keen to recruit or capture them for their own ends. One thing they lack is the capability to intentionally take another life. This pacifistic element of their make up is referred to as the "prime barrier" and any Tomorrow Person who causes the loss of a human life would be driven insane by the confusion in their brain. They also have connections with the "Galactic Federation" which oversees the welfare of telepathic species throughout the galaxy. In addition to their psychic powers (the so-called 3T's of telepathy, telekinesis and teleportation), they use advanced technology such as the biological (called in the series "biotronic") computer TIM, which is capable of original thought, telepathy, and can augment their psychic powers. TIM also helps the Tomorrow People to teleport long distances, although they must be wearing a device installed into a belt or bracelet for this to work. Teleportation is referred to as jaunting in the programme. The team used jaunting belts up to the end of Series 5, after which they used much smaller wristbands.

In the original series, the Tomorrow People are also referred to as both Homo novis and Homo superior. The term appeared in David Bowie's 1971 song "Oh! You Pretty Things": "Let me make it plain. You gotta make way for the Homo Superior." This term came up as part of a conversation between Roger Price and David Bowie at a meeting at Granada Studios in Manchester when Price was directing a programme in which Bowie was appearing. Price had been working on a script for his Tomorrow People project and during a conversation with Bowie, the term Homo superior came up. Bowie liked the term and soon afterwards wrote it into his song. Price has sometimes been quoted as saying that the lyrics to this song were inspired by the series.

Alistair McGown of Screenonline cites the book The Mind in Chains by Christopher Evans as a primary source. Evans also became a scientific advisor for the series. He was credited as such on every single episode but most people working on the show seem to recall that he only had involvement in the first couple of series. McGown also suggests a similarity between The Tomorrow People and the children's fantasy fiction of Enid Blyton.

While they reveal their existence to some, the Tomorrow People generally operate in secrecy for fear that normal people (whom they term "Saps", an abbreviation of Homo sapiens) will either fear or victimise them because of their special powers, or try to exploit them for military purposes. In order to defend themselves they must use non-lethal weaponry such as "stun guns" or martial arts; this is owing to their genetic unwillingness to kill, referred to as the "prime barrier". In early series they had the aid of "Sap" friends such as Ginge, Lefty and Chris who usually handled the rougher stuff that the pacifist TPs could not deal with. Also, in the second and third series, they became friendly with a psychic researcher named Professor Cawston who assisted them and vice versa.

Roger Price dreamed up the idea in 1970; he initially offered the format to Granada, where he was working, but was turned down so offered it to Southern Television, who expressed an interest but had concerns over the budgetary requirements. Finally, Lewis Rudd at Thames Television commissioned a 13-episode series, having seen the potential of the format and looking to replace Ace of Wands after its three-year run. At this time, ITV was keen to find its own answer to Doctor Who, although Price never really envisaged the show as such but more as an outlet for his own personal ideas and beliefs. Very early on, Ruth Boswell was brought in as associate producer and script editor as she had experience of children's fantasy drama (Timeslip and Tightrope) while TV dramatist Brian Finch was hired to co-write the scripts as Price had little experience of writing drama. Finch disliked the experience as he was not engaged by the material and found a large part of his time was taken up in trying to rein in Price and his very ambitious ideas. Thames enlisted the services of Doctor Who director Paul Bernard to help set up and oversee the first series. He was credited as director for two stories but was unofficially a third producer. Bernard was very heavily involved in the creation of the memorable title sequence which involved a mixture of haunting images and facial shots of the main cast zooming towards the camera in monochrome, with an eerie theme tune from prolific Doctor Who and Blake’s 7 composer Dudley Simpson playing behind. He got inspiration from seeing billboards rushing towards him when driving. The sequence opened with a clenched fist opening out to signify a telepathic mind breaking out. Amongst the next shots were a human foetus, shadowy figures behind scaffolding and even the insides of a bell pepper (a somewhat exotic fruit in the UK in the 1970s).

Over its six-year run, the format proved flexible enough to encompass various types of stories including traditional alien invasions adventures as well as espionage thrillers, slapstick comedy, time travel, political satires, space opera and even on occasion more adult concepts than would be normally found in a teatime drama for children. As it was aimed at young people, it often reflected popular fashions and fads of the time, but usually with a suitable sinister twist. For example, "Hitler's Last Secret" in 1978 involved the TPs investigating a sudden craze for wearing Nazi uniforms amongst teenagers (reflecting the actions of the then contemporary punk rockers) but was a precursor to Hitler being revived from suspended animation by a group of Nazis. The following season's "The Living Skins" saw aliens transforming themselves into fashionable plastic jump suits that would control and eventually kill the millions of people who wear them. The 1974 adventure "The Blue and the Green" saw the whole of humanity divided by a craze to wear blue or green badges for a children's show. In 1977 Mike joins a pop band, "The Heart of Sogguth", whose hell-raising music will bring back the Devil when millions of teenagers are watching them on television. The popularity of the book "Chariots of the Gods" was also an influence on 1975's "Worlds Away" when it is revealed that the evil Kulthan had controlled and assisted the ancient Egyptians.

=== Series One ===
Price saw the lead casting as very important, as he wanted talented and attractive actors who would appeal to the young audience, but also be personable and easy to work with during the long hours envisaged in studio or out on location. Nicholas Young was cast as the group's leader, John, while Peter Vaughan Clarke was offered the role of Stephen after Price saw him in a Manchester rendition of Peter Pan with Lulu. Ruth Boswell wanted Lynne Frederick (later the last wife of Peter Sellers) for Carol, the female lead, but following a meeting with her, Paul Bernard felt she was a bit too upper-class and precious for what he had in mind, as he saw the character as being similar to Doctor Who's Jo Grant. They finally settled on Sammie Winmill who was relatively well-known for playing Nurse Crumpton on the popular Doctor at Large situation comedy (also a Thames production). The role of Kenny, the youngest TP, was given to Stephen Salmon after he had been discovered in a drama workshop while theatre actor Philip Gilbert was selected to provide the paternal tones of biotronic computer TIM. Making up the team were two Sap friends, a couple of bikers called Ginge (Michael Standing) and Lefty (Derek Crewe) who encounter the Tomorrow People when acting as henchmen for the villainous shape-shifter Jedikiah in the opening adventure. Stephen would be very much the show's hero and focus for the audience while John was something of an authoritarian figure who took his responsibilities for the species' future and welfare very seriously. Young was the only TP to be in every single episode and the actor was able to have some say in the production of later seasons as he was considered as an unofficial producer. Kenny was given very little to do and was often left behind in the Lab (due to being the youngest) while the others went off to have the actual adventures. Filming commenced in March 1973 with location work in Muswell Hill. Production of this first story, "The Slaves of Jedikiah" was much troubled, as the crew found they were unfamiliar with the technical demands of a science fiction drama. The first day in studio was disastrous, with virtually no usable material getting made and there was some tension between the cast and Paul Bernard, who was very authoritarian with them. Additionally Nicholas Young hit a wall while working on the darkened entrance to the Lab, which was being filmed inside the actual disused tube station at Wood Lane, which had closed in the 1940s. Young was fortunately not badly injured and able to carry on later that day after a recovery break.

Early publicity included a photo session showing the cast with Doctor Who star Jon Pertwee to indicate a friendly rivalry between the two shows. Look-in provided a great deal of coverage of the series and by July launched its own comic strip version (which ran on and off in its pages for the next five years). TVTimes also promoted the new show with an article on its first week.

The production procedure was standard in the seventies with a limited amount of location work (done on film) followed by a day in studio to record each episode on videotape. Even for the time, some of the special effects of the show were considered sub-par, largely attributable to its small budget. The first season was budgeted at approx £5000 per episode which was roughly half the cost of the BBC's budget for Doctor Who. Most directors on the show relied heavily on chroma key to get their desired effects, but, owing to the rushed time on studio days, the results varied greatly. To make it even more difficult, studio time was restricted as English law dictated that juvenile actors could only work a certain number of hours in a day.

Season one's recurring villain, Jedikiah, was originally devised to be a long-running foe like the Master from Doctor Who. After seeing the poorly-designed robot that was the shape-changer's true form, an unimpressed Price decided not to use the character again until the finale of series three, which was planned at that time as the series' finale. (The robotic form noticeably fails to appear). Despite these limitations, the series proved popular with its young audience, who watched in large numbers, and even dented the figures for the popular BBC children's magazine programme Blue Peter.

=== Series Two ===
The success of the first series saw another 13 episodes go into production quite soon after, but with a number of changes. Off-screen, both Bernard and Finch departed leaving Price to take more control as writer, director and producer, while on-screen Kenny and Carol disappeared (sent to the Galactic Federation's headquarters The Trig to work as ambassadors for Earth). Salmon was simply not asked back as there was a feeling the character had failed to work and his acting was considered wooden (plus Salmon had never been very keen to appear as he had no interest in acting), while Winmill's departure was voluntary as the actress was concerned about being associated with a long running series. In their place came student school teacher Elizabeth M'Bondo, portrayed by Elizabeth Adare. Adare initially thought her character was to be a teenage girl and made every effort at her audition to look and act like one. Price and Boswell were still impressed to change the Elizabeth character so that she breaks out at an older age due to a latent puberty. Elizabeth is uncovered by Stephen when working at his school, where she is doing her teacher training. This was the start of a near-annual event where a new TP was introduced in the first story of each series, a handy way of maintaining interest for returning viewers and a convenient way for Price to re-establish the basic premise of the show for new audiences every year. Adare stayed until the end in 1979 but grew unhappy with the quality of later scripts. Knowing the importance of her appearing as a black female actress on a British TV production, she decided to remain.

Filming of Series 2 began in late 1973 with Michael Standing returning as Ginge. On the first day he fell off his motorbike and broke his leg, prompting a speedy rewrite whereby Ginge's younger brother, Chris (Chris Chittell), was now the new Sap regular. Chris was mentioned in the dialogue as already being known to the Tomorrow People, so few changes had to be made to the script. Ginge's absence was explained on by his having been admitted to hospital for the same injury as in real life. Price would later comment that he felt neither Ginge or Lefty had ever felt right for the format.

=== Series Three ===
In 1975, the third series added Dean Lawrence as gypsy Tyso Boswell, yet another character from a minority as Price was determined that the Tomorrow People could be from any ethnic or society background. Chris disappears after only appearing in one episode (his absence is never explained) while telepathic secret agent Tricia Conway appears in two stories before fully breaking out in the series climax which saw the young heroes menaced by old rival, Jedikiah. Viewers saw on screen why the youngsters have to maintain their secrecy and vigilance from the rest of humanity, as the British Secret Intelligence Service hunted them down for their own purposes in the opening adventure. This series also saw the group visit an alien world for the first time when the Galactic Trig dispatches them to help the telepathic population of the planet Peerie. Production on this story ran into trouble when Lawrence hurt his knee during location filming and the injury had to be included in the script.

A comedy script was attempted in "A Man for Emily", which featured Peter Davison in his television debut and his future wife Sandra Dickinson,. Price was keen to get more into humorous writing. The backlash to this experiment resulted in a planned sequel story being dropped. Such actions added to Price's increasing frustration with the show. Philip Gilbert also made the first on-screen appearances as Timus Irnok Mosta, an ambassador from the Galactic Federation who had a hand in building TIM and thus sounded like him. Timus was a clone. His identifical brother, Tikno, also appears. They made semi-regular appearances until the final story in 1979, helping to fulfil a clause in Gilbert's contract that he had to be seen or heard at least once every episode. As stated, old enemy Jedikiah made a dramatic return to exact revenge in the last story. It ends with an air of finality as the Tomorrow People (including the just broken out Trisha Conway), having only just survived the encounter (at one point John, Elizabeth and Tikno are violently gunned down and left barely alive), decide to leave Earth for the Galactic Trig with only a promise from Elizabeth that they will return at some time.

=== Series Four ===
By now, Price had become tired of his creation and attempted to end it by killing off the leads at the conclusion to Series 3, but Ruth Boswell made him rewrite it so that they survived. Thames Television had a ratings winner (as well as excellent overseas sales) and insisted he continue the programme, albeit in shorter, staggered seasons from now on. Price only ever allowed one attempt by another writer to work on it solo, with John E. Watkins penning the story "Into the Unknown" broadcast in early 1976. Price was not satisfied with the final episodes and decided he would be sole writer from that point on. Having fewer episodes to write every year, Price would have more time to work on his comedic and light-entertainment productions, which he enjoyed more than the demanding sci-fi drama. At the start of the fourth series he attempted to give a boost to the format with the introduction of teenage idol Mike Holoway as Mike Bell. Holoway was the drummer with pop band Flintlock who were the regular house band on Price's You Must Be Joking, and Price hoped that his young charge would be Britain's answer to Donny Osmond or David Cassidy. Mike's arrival swells the ranks of TPs in the Lab to five (Tricia had remained on the Trig, due to Ann Courthoys' departure from the series) which made things look a bit overcrowded, this led to the decision to sack Vaughan-Clarke as Stephen, who ignobly disappears off screen after the season finished and is never even mentioned again. Mike was now being touted as the show's hero and with this change, it was noticeable that John and Elizabeth took on a more parental role as both actors entered their mid-20s. Tyso also vanished after the fourth year, but his character had been mostly redundant for some time due to not having been written into scripts that year. His late inclusion was only addressed a couple of weeks before filming started when Price discovered from Lawrence that he was still available to appear in the programme (he had been led to believe that he had moved abroad). This meant Tyso only had limited screen time and few lines. What scenes Tyso was in he was either the butt of a joke, or in a position where he was rarely pleased to be seen. Anne Curthoys was asked back to play Tricia, but was committed to a daytime soap at Thames.

=== Series Five ===
Vic Hughes took over as producer for Series 5, which began transmission in early 1977 and was the only series not to introduce a new Tomorrow person (although the first story does feature a potential TP in Russian teenager, Pavla). All three adventures were two-parters which allowed Price to write them quickly and remove any padding which tended to slow down the action. Mike Holoway was now very much the star of the show as on screen, Mike developed into the resident hero guided by an increasingly parental John and Elizabeth. His band Flintlock even appeared in the closing adventure, "The Heart of Sogguth". From this season on, Price was only be credited as the writer but he retained overall control of the series and was heavily involved in major decisions.

=== Series Six ===
1978 saw changes being made, starting with Elizabeth's absence through most of Series 6 owing to Elizabeth Adare's pregnancy. On screen Elizabeth is working on diplomatic missions for the Galactic Federation and appears briefly on a screen so as to hide the actress's condition. In her place came Hsui Tai, played by Japanese actress Misako Koba, whose poor grasp of English made her hard to understand. Nicholas Young later recalled that he and other actors found this difficult during production. Koba had no previous acting experience and had been suggested for the role by her actor husband. A new Lab set was introduced with a smaller but now mobile TIM and the jaunting belts were replaced by jaunting bands worn on the wrists. These changes were forced on the production team following a fire at the Thames storerooms. The new Lab acted as both base and home for the Tomorrow People as they were now seen to be sleeping in their own cabins there. It was noticeably smaller than the previous set, which freed up more space in the studio for the designers to utilise on other sets. The 6 episodes were produced off and on through 1977 (a combination of Price writing scripts as and when it fitted with his other production commitments and a number of strikes at ITV over the year) and finally launched in the Spring of 78. Such was Holoway's popularity that he was featured on the cover of TV Times to promote the start of the season.

=== Series Seven ===
Series 7 in late 1978 introduced another Tomorrow person in the form of young Scottish lad Andrew Forbes (Nigel Rhodes). Rhodes had previously worked as an extra on A Much Needed Holiday, but became more known to Price when he worked on his 1977 comedy series, You Can't Be Serious. The young actor was delighted to win the role, as he was a great fan of the show. Andrew is introduced after he starts using his psychic powers to conjure up images of ghosts so as to provide a tourism attraction for the hotel owned by his father. Elizabeth also returned from her year on the Trig.

=== Series Eight and cancellation ===
With inflation out of control in the late 1970s, the budget was stretched to breaking point, a factor often the mind of producer Vic Hughes. A dispute over the allocation of studio days ended the show in 1979 when Hughes attempted to gain an extra studio day for the planned ninth series (which fell victim to the ITV strike that summer) following many problems during the production of "War of the Empires" (the sole four-part adventure that made up series 8) which had been given only four days in studio. This was in part due to an ambitious script that, with its frequent space battles, was inspired by Star Wars. Price had by this time emigrated to America after being headhunted to help set up children's channel Nickelodeon, and Thames was reluctant to carry on without him. Whatever the reason, the series vanished after a short repeat run in early 1980.

=== Characters ===
- TIM (voice of Philip Gilbert). A biological computer, programmed with an artificially created intelligence, whose tubes are filled with bio-fluid. He was built in part by John, the leader of the Tomorrow People, and was given to them by the Galactic Council. TIM is housed in The Lab, situated in a disused station in the London Underground. TIM often helps out the Tomorrow People by providing vital information, which the telepaths can use in their current adventure. TIM's voice is identical to that of diplomat Timus Irnok Mosta from the Galactic Federation, because Timus' clone-brother Tykno is the premier AI scientist of the Federation and all Federation AI's have their voice.
- John (Nicholas Young) – Aged 17, John is the leader of the Tomorrow People. He is an inventor and scientist. He built The Lab and the biological computer, TIM, with some help from the Galactic Council. John was the first Tomorrow Person to "break out" and had no guidance through the process. In later episodes he mentions that his father is a police officer and a Freemason.
- Carol (Sammie Winmill, season 1) – Along with John and Kenny, Carol had been monitoring Stephen, as he had been unconsciously tuning into their thoughts, via telepathy. When Stephen collapses and is taken to hospital, John sends Carol to help him break out.
- Kenny (Stephen Salmon, season 1). -- At 12, is the youngest of the original four Tomorrow People. According to Carol, he "broke out" when he was very young. He is always left behind to look after The Lab.
- Stephen Jameson (Peter Vaughan-Clarke, seasons 1-4). The first Tomorrow Person to break out on screen. At first he finds it hard to believe that he is a Tomorrow Person, but comes to accept it.
- Jedikiah (Francis de Wolff and Roger Bizley). "[A] fierce, shape-changing alien robot," initially seen (in "The Slaves of Jedikiah") in the service of the "Cyclops" (later discovered to be 'Ranesh'), who uses Jedikiah to capture the Tomorrow People in an effort to use their psi powers to enable the Cyclops' damaged ship to return home. By the end of the serial, Jedikiah had been damaged and jettisoned into space. By the time he is recovered (in "The Medusa Strain"), 500 years had passed, and the damage caused to Jedikiah in the previous story, coupled with this long isolation, had driven the robot insane, possessing a pathological hatred of the Tomorrow People. He has since devoted his existence to their destruction. However, in "The Revenge of Jedikiah", in which the character made his final appearance, he was stripped of his shape-shifting powers by Timus and the Galactic Federation and condemned to labour on Earth forever as a homeless derelict.
- Elizabeth M'Bondo – (Elizabeth Adare, seasons 2-8). The first addition to the original line-up, introduced at the beginning of the second season. She is a student teacher at Stephen's school and is said to be the same age as John. She often brings a sense of compassion to the Tomorrow People and is one of the few people capable of standing up to John, notably in "The Doomsday Men" when she convinces him to save stranded astronaut Lee, as well as facing down several villains. Towards the end of the series, she becomes more involved in galactic affairs and spends a lot of time at the Galactic Trig, including the whole of season six.
- Tyso Boswell – (Dean Lawrence, seasons 3-4). Introduced at the start of the third season, he comes from a gypsy background and has a number of younger siblings. The Tomorrow People first encounter him when he is captured by Colonel Masters. He forms a partnership with Stephen in some stories and has a cheeky attitude.
- Patricia Conway – (Anne Curthoys, season 3). A telepath working for Colonel Masters at the Experimental Weapons Establishment, who appears in "Secret Weapon" and "Revenge of Jedikiah". She is initially at odds with the Tomorrow People, seeking to capture them and force them to work for British Intelligence. After Masters' death, she allies with the Tomorrow People against Jedikiah. She hears Stephen's telepathic cry for help, causing her to break out and jaunt to the lab. Afterwards, she goes to work at the Trig.
- Mike Bell – (Mike Holoway, seasons 4-8). A working class Cockney living with his mother and sister. He is introduced at the start of season four when a group of London criminals try to force him to use his powers to help them commit crimes. Although loyal to the Tomorrow People, he is less willing to follow John's orders, and often clashes with him. In later seasons, he acts as leader when John and Elizabeth are absent, notably in "War of the Empires".
- Pavla Vlasova – (Anulka Dziubinska). A Russian telepath who appears in "The Dirtiest Business". She has been abducted by the KGB and forced to work for them, and escapes from her handlers during a trip to London. The Tomorrow People try to find and help her but she is killed when the KGB detonate a micro-explosive planted in her body, to prevent her giving away their secrets.
- Hsui Tai – (Misako Koba, seasons 6-8). A girl in her mid-teens (around the same age as Mike), introduced at the start of the sixth season. She is one of the living child goddesses worshipped by a sect of Chinese monks, who are sacrificed and supposedly reincarnated when they reach adulthood. After John and Mike put an end to the practice, Hsui Tai joins them in the lab. She adapts reasonably well to western ways but still encounters cultural difficulties on occasion.
- Andrew Forbes – (Nigel Rhodes, seasons 7-8). A Scottish boy who lives in a hotel run by his father. He gains the ability to project illusions and uses them to convince people the hotel is haunted, in order to attract guests. His father believes he is possessed by a demon until the Tomorrow People get in touch and explain what Andrew is. He then splits his time between the Tomorrow People and helping his father at the hotel.
- Peter - (Richard Speight, seasons 1-2) – A telepath from the 26th century, who refers to the current Tomorrow People as Homo novus (New man). Although apparently a teenager, he is later revealed that he is 163 years old.
- Timus – (Philip Gilbert). A maverick Galactic Federation diplomat and ally of the Tomorrow People. As revealed in the episode "Worlds Apart", Timus has sixty-four cloned brothers, including Tikno, who is also an ally of the Tomorrow People and the mentioned, but unseen Timon, who created TIM.
- Zenon – (Stephen Jack). Grandfather of Peter, who appears in "A Rift in Time". Stephen encounters him while looking for Peter and Zenon gives him the ability to travel into the past.
- Ginger 'Ginge' Harding – (Michael Standing, season 1). The leader of a biker gang hired by Jedikiah. He initially hunts the Tomorrow People but when he learns Jedikiah's true nature he changes sides. He is a regular fixture at the lab during the first season and often helps the Tomorrow People out with their problems. He is physically strong but occasionally shows a lack of intelligence.
- Lefty – (Derek Crewe, season 1). Ginger's sidekick. Like him, he is allied first with Jedikiah and then the Tomorrow People. He is dimwitted but sometimes seems more sensible than Ginge. He appears in "The Slaves of Jedikiah" and "The Vanishing Earth".
- Chris Harding – (Chris Chittell, season 2), Ginger's younger brother, who replaces him as the Tomorrow People's human ally. Although often used for comic relief, he is quite intelligent, providing the solution to a problem on occasion notably in "Secret Weapon", and accompanies the Tomorrow People on a trip back in time in "A Rift in Time". He disappears after the first story of season three.
- Professor Cawston – (Bryan Stanyon, seasons 2-3) Cawston is a parapsychology professor who Stephen shows some of his powers to in order to get access to a vase kept at his university. He discovers Tyso, who is in the process of breaking out, which brings him to the attention of Colonel Masters. After the Tomorrow People contact him, he becomes their ally against Masters and later Jedikiah.

=== Tie-in fiction ===
A comic-strip version was also produced, written by Angus P. Allan and printed in the comic Look-In , which ran somewhat concurrently with the 1970s series. Children's book imprint Piccolo Books, which had also published the first edition of Terrance Dicks and Malcolm Hulke's THe Making of Doctor Who, published five tie-in novels during the seventies: The Visitor (1973), Three into Three (1974), Four into Three (1975), One Law (1976) and Lost Gods (1977). In 1978, there was also a children's annual.The Visitor was written before production began on the series and offers a glimpse of some of the original ideas for the show that never made it to screen. Here, Tomorrow People contact TIM via wrist communicators, as the computer is not telepathic and the characters of Ginge and Lefty are portrayed as much younger than on screen. The Lab is also accessed from the back of a regular Tube station.

== Revivals ==
=== 1990s series: (1992–1995) ===
The Tomorrow People
- Genre: Fantasy / Drama / Sci-Fi
- Created by: Roger Damon Price
- Starring: Kristian Schmid; Christian Tessier; Adam Pearce; Kristen Ariza; Naomie Harris; Alexandra Milman
- Country of origin: United Kingdom
- Original language: English
- No. of series: 3
- No. of episodes: 25 (List)

Production
- Running time: 30 minutes
- Production companies: Tetra Films; Reeves Entertainment for Thames (1992) for Central (1994–1995)

Original release
- Network: ITV
- Release: 18 November 1992 – 8 March 1995

Price produced the 1990s revival of The Tomorrow People for Tetra Films (an independent production company, mostly comprising the former children's department at Thames Television) in association with the Thames-owned American company Reeves Entertainment for Thames and Nickelodeon between 1992 and 1995 (broadcast by Central in 1994 and 1995 on ITV as Thames had lost its franchise at the end of 1992). After some pressure from executives, Price decided to start with a blank slate and so the show was almost completely different from its predecessor. The original cast, characters, and music were not used. The new series incorporated a multi-national cast to ensure that worldwide syndication sales would be easier to obtain. Each story is five episodes long, unlike the 1970s show, which never had a story that long after "The Blue and the Green" in the second season.

The distinctive belt buckles were omitted, as the new Tomorrow People were able to teleport without them. The non-lethal stun guns and other gadgetry were also done away with. The new Tomorrow People relied more on their wits and powers to get out of trouble.

There remain some analogies, however. The Lab was replaced by a psychic spaceship in the South Pacific to which Tomorrow People are drawn when they "break out". TIM is replaced by an ostensibly mute computer that is part of the alien ship. The visual effects were improved considerably by effects artist Clive Davis compared to the original series, along with sets.

The lead role of Adam Newman was given to Kristian Schmid, who at the time was famous in the UK for his regular role in Neighbours. The other original stars were Kristen Ariza as Lisa Davies, Adam Pearce (who had no previous acting experience) as Kevin Wilson and Christian Tessier as Kevin's American friend Marmaduke "Megabyte" Damon. The 1992 season consisted of a single five-part story written by Price, which had no on-screen title but was named as "The Origin Story" in the DVD release. Adam is newly broken out as the series begins with Lisa and Kevin breaking out simultaneously in the first episode. Megabyte also breaks out in the last episode of the story. The plotline borrowed heavily from the 1975 story "Secret Weapon", even reusing the name of that story's villain Colonel Masters, and involved the intelligence services pursuing the Tomorrow People in order to use them for their own ends. The story also introduced Jeff Harding as Megabyte's father General Damon, an American officer stationed in the United Kingdom, who became a regular ally to the Tomorrow People.

The second season was filmed in 1993 and began transmitting in January 1994, with Price now credited as executive producer and the writing handed over to Grant Cathro and Lee Pressman, who had previously experience writing CITV's other children's fantasy series T-Bag and Mike and Angelo. The seasons were expanded to ten episodes, comprising two five-part stories. Cathro and Pressman plotted the stories together then scripted one each (for the second season they were credited as co-writers, for the third they were only credited on the story they scripted). They chose to power down the Tomorrow People slightly, since the first story had shown Lisa reviving from the dead at one point. The lengthy scenes on the island where the ship was located from the first season were dropped, with the ship exterior only seen in stock establishing shots and the Tomorrow People now teleporting directly into the ship when they broke out rather than the ocean around it.

Lisa was dropped without explanation and Kevin's role was severely reduced, with him only appearing in three episodes of the first story and spending most of his time comatose before also being dropped with no explanation. As a result, the series now focused on Adam and Megabyte, two characters who had not interacted in the first season, and their relationship soon mirrored than between John and Stephen in the original series. Breaking out in the opening episode of the season was Ami Jackson, played by Naomie Harris. Her mother, played by Sally Sagoe, had a small role in the remaining stories, initially trying to stop Ami spending time with the Tomorrow People before accepting her need to use her powers to help others. The first story of the second season, "The Culex Experiment", guest starred Jean Marsh as the villainous Doctor Culex.

The third season debuted the following year: The opening story, "The Rameses Connection", guest starred Christopher Lee as lead villain Sam Rees/Rameses. It saw the first example of the phrase "breaking out" being used and of the Tomorrow People's powers being blocked, when Rameses prevents Adam from teleporting, both key features of the 1970s show. The second story, "The Living Stones", only featured Ami in a small role in the first episode, with her absence explained as her being on holiday with her mother. Instead, Jade Weston, a minor character from "The Culex Experiment" played by Alexandra Milman, was brought back to accompany Adam and Megabyte and broke out as a Tomorrow Person in the last episode. This story featured the first use of aliens in the 1990s series, as the Tomorrow People battled a group of alien spores which had crashed near a village and possessed most of the villagers. Shortly after this, it was announced that the show would not be returning for a fourth season.

=== Audio revival ===
In 2001, Big Finish Productions launched a series of new audio plays based on the original series, produced by Nigel Fairs. Nicholas Young and Philip Gilbert reprised their roles as John and TIM, with Helen Goldwyn and James Daniel Wilson appearing as Elena and Paul, the new Tomorrow People. Some releases also feature other original cast members, such as Peter Vaughan-Clarke, Elizabeth Adare and Mike Holoway (notably Trigonometry). Trevor Littledale took over the role of TIM in the audio series from The Warlock's Dance onwards after Philip Gilbert's death in 2004.

Five series were produced of the audio series. It was cancelled in December 2007 because of the discontinuation of a licensing arrangement with Fremantle Media Enterprises. CDs of the series were permanently withdrawn from sale on 7 January 2008. However, the CDs are often still available from online sellers such as Amazon and eBay, and at science fiction conventions.

=== 2013 American series ===
In November 2012, Deadline Hollywood announced that Julie Plec and Greg Berlanti had obtained the rights to The Tomorrow People and commissioned a pilot written by Phil Klemmer. This occurred after a similar rights option expired to an aborted attempt two years previously.

It was announced on 28 January 2013 that the revival had received a pilot order from The CW Television Network. On 21 February 2013, Australian actor Luke Mitchell was cast for the pilot as John Young.

The pilot was picked up as a series on 9 May 2013. It aired on Wednesdays in the 9:00 pm Eastern/8:00 pm Central timeslot following Arrow. On 17 March 2014, The Tomorrow People moved to a permanent Monday night time slot.

On 8 May 2014, just one day shy of its first anniversary of being picked up by the CW, the channel declined to renew The Tomorrow People for a second season.

=== 2020s book series ===
In 2023 a new series of original, authorised novels was launched by Chinbeard Books and Oak Tree Books to mark the show's 50th anniversary.

The Tomorrow People: Changes (2023) was written by Andy Davidson, with original series creator Roger Price

This was followed by a bi-monthly series of novellas The First One (2024) by Gary Russell, Children of the Evolution (2024) by Iain McLaughlin, Homo Inferior (2024) by Nigel Fairs and The Man Who Sold the World (2025) by Rebecca Levene and David Derbyshire, Prime Factors by Kenton Hall and The Last One (2025) by Gary Russell.

== Documentaries ==
In October 2005, Fantom Films and First Time Films released the 1997 documentary about the series entitled Beyond Tomorrow. The documentary features interviews with cast members from the original series, including Nicholas Young (John), Peter Vaughan-Clarke (Stephen), Sammie Winmill (Carol), Elizabeth Adare (Liz), Dean Lawrence (Tyso), Mike Holoway (Mike) and Philip Gilbert.

The following year, Fantom Films released a second DVD discussing the 1990s series with writers Lee Pressman and Grant Cathro, entitled Re-inventing The Tomorrow People.

== Bibliography ==
- Price, Roger & Gregory, Julian (1973). The Tomorrow People in "The Visitor". London: Piccolo TV Times. ISBN 0-330-23477-3
- Price, Roger (1974). The Tomorrow People in "Three in Three". London. Piccolo TV Times. ISBN 0-330-24105-2
- Price, Roger (1975). The Tomorrow People in "Four into Three". London. Piccolo TV Times. ISBN 0-330-24294-6
- Price, Roger (1976). The Tomorrow People in "One Law". London. Piccolo TV Times. ISBN 0-330-24312-8
- Price, Roger (1979). The Tomorrow People in "The Lost Gods" with "Hitler's Last Secret" and "The Thargon Menace". London. Piccolo TV Times. ISBN 0-330-25614-9
- Unknown (1978). The Tomorrow People Annual 1979. Knutsford. Stafford Pemberton. ISBN 0-86030-124-9
- Robinson, Nigel (1995). The Tomorrow People: The Culex Experiment. London. Boxtree. ISBN 0-7522-0637-0
- Robinson, Nigel (1995). The Tomorrow People: Monsoon Man. London. Boxtree. ISBN 0-7522-0642-7
- Robinson, Nigel (1995). The Tomorrow People: The Rameses Connection. London. Sapling. ISBN 0-7522-0647-8
- Robinson, Nigel (1995). The Tomorrow People: The Living Stones. London. Sapling. ISBN 0-7522-0652-4
- Davidson, Andy (2013). Jaunt: An Unofficial Guide to the Tomorrow People. London. Miwk. ISBN 978-1-908630-23-0
- Davidson, Andy (2022). Jaunt. A Viewer's Guide to the Tomorrow People. London. Ten Acre Films. ISBN 978-1-908630-97-1
