= Bruce Boa =

Canadian actor (1930–2004)

- Born: Andrew Bruce Boa; 10 July 1930; Port Stanley, Ontario, Canada
- Died: 17 April 2004 (aged 73); Surrey, England
- Occupation: Actor
- Years active: 1958–1997
- Spouse: Cherry Boa
- Children: 3
- Relatives: Marion Woodman (sister)

Andrew Bruce Boa (10 July 1930 – 17 April 2004) was a Canadian actor, who found success playing the token American in British films and television, usually playing military types. Boa's most notable film role is in The Empire Strikes Back (1980) as General Carlist Rieekan. On television, his most notable role is probably as the brash, plain-speaking American guest, Mr. Harry Hamilton, in the Fawlty Towers episode "Waldorf Salad".

== Early life ==
Bruce Boa was born on 10 July 1930 in Port Stanley, Ontario, the second of three children of Ila (née Phinn) and Andrew Boa, a clergyman. His older sister was Jungian analyst and author Marion Woodman, and his younger brother was Fraser Boa, also a Jungian analyst, who died in 1992. Boa attended the University of Western Ontario, graduating in 1952 with a degree in theology, then spent a brief period playing professional football for the Calgary Stampeders in 1952.

After travelling through Central America and Europe, he began his acting career in England in 1956 and settled there permanently in the 1960s. In a 1959 interview, when he was aged 29, he said he had also written poetry, a novel and film scripts, and hoped to make a living combining writing and acting.

== Career ==
Boa's film credits include Man in the Middle (1964), The Adding Machine (1969), Who? (1973), The Cherry Picker (1974), The Omen (1976), Silver Bears, Superman, Carry On Emmannuelle (1978), A Touch of the Sun, The London Connection, A Nightingale Sang in Berkeley Square (1979), Silver Dream Racer (1980), Ragtime (1981), Octopussy (1983), Return to Oz (1985), and Screamers (1995). He also played the Marine colonel in Full Metal Jacket (1987) who chastises Matthew Modine's character over having a peace pin on his lapel while having "Born To Kill" written on his combat helmet.

On television, he appeared in Thriller (1975), in 1977 Come Back, Little Sheba, an episode of Laurence Olivier Presents, opposite Laurence Olivier and Joanne Woodward. Other television credits include: Fawlty Towers, The Avengers, Out of the Unknown, The Champions, The Troubleshooters, The Saint, Ace of Wands, Special Branch, The Onedin Line, Z-Cars, The New Avengers, The Professionals, The Omega Factor, Dempsey and Makepeace, Astronauts, Hart to Hart, Remington Steele, Howards' Way, the 1979 miniseries A Man Called Intrepid, the 1988 television film The Bourne Identity, Tales of the Unexpected, As Time Goes By, Road to Avonlea, Kavanagh QC, Bulman and Warship.

== Death ==
Boa died from cancer on 17 April 2004 in Surrey, England.

== Filmography ==
=== Film ===
Year	Title	Role	Notes
1960	Man in the Moon	Roy	Film debut
1964	Man in the Middle	Major Lawson	
1968	The Mini-Affair	American Newman	
1969	Can Heironymus Merkin Ever Forget Mercy Humppe and Find True Happiness?	Car Salesman	Uncredited
1969	The Adding Machine	Detective	
1970	The Revolutionary	Guest at Party	
1970	Mister Jerico	Nolan	
1974	The Cherry Picker	Dr. Softman	
1974	Who?	Miller	
1976	The Omen	Thorn's Aide	
1977	Silver Bears	American Banker	
1978	Carry On Emmannuelle	US Ambassador	
1978	Superman	Joint Chief of General Staff	Extended Version, Uncredited
1979	The London Connection	Colonel	
1979	Unidentified Flying Oddball	Air Force Officer	Uncredited
1979	A Touch of the Sun	Jim Coburn	
1979	A Nightingale Sang in Berkeley Square	Morgan Stanfield	
1980	The Ninth Configuration	Sergeant in Combat Shack	
1980	The Empire Strikes Back	General Carlist Rieekan	
1980	Silver Dream Racer	2nd TV Reporter	
1981	Ragtime	Jerome	
1983	Octopussy	General Peterson	
1984	Scream for Help	Surgeon	
1984	The Razor's Edge	Henry Maturin	
1985	Water	US Advisor	
1985	Return to Oz	Policeman	
1986	The American Way	Colonel Parker	
1986	Ping Pong	American Tourist	
1987	Full Metal Jacket	POGE Colonel	
1988	Hawks	Byron Deckermensky	
1989	Slipstream	Guard Supervisor	
1989	Murder Story	Corrigan	
1990	The Serpent of Death	Bartlet	
1991	White Light	Clay Avery	
1993	For the Moment	Mr. Anderson	
1993	The Neighbor	Bishop	
1995	Screamers	Secretary Green	Final film

=== Television ===
Year	Title	Role	Notes
1958–1960	ITV Television Playhouse	Various	4 episodes
1958–1961	Armchair Theatre	Psychologist/Brewster	2 episodes
1959	The Four Just Men	Cop/Connolly	2 episodes
1959	BBC Sunday Night Theatre	Unknown	1 episode
1959	Interpol Calling	Driver (uncredited)	Episode: "The Man's a Clown"
1962	Studio 4	Dr. Baird	Episode: "Flight into Danger"
1962	Out of This World	Monty Archer	Episode: "Immigrant"
1962	The Avengers	Bob Slade	Episode: "Dead on Course"
1963–1968	The Saint	Various	3 episodes
1963	Zero One	Simon	Episode: "Downdraft"
1963	The Third Man	Insp. McDonald	Episode: "No Word for Danger"
1963	Suspense	Anaethetist/Dr. Ridgeway	2 episodes
1963	ITV Play of the Week	H.C./Judge Windelman	2 episodes
1963	The Plane Makers	Vegra	Episode: "Strings in Whitehall"
1964	Drama 61-67	Potter	Episode: "Studio 64: Better Luck Next Time"
1964	Espionage	Larry	Episode: "Some Other Kind of Wonderful"
1964	The Sullavan Brothers	Ashley	Episode: "The Man from New York"
1965–1969	The Troubleshooters	Jean-Paul Godin/Bill Douglas	7 episodes
1966	Out of the Unknown	K.G. Bullen	Episode: "Satisfaction Guaranteed"
1968	Man in a Suitcase	Inspector Bergson	Episode: "The Revolutionaries"
1968	Detective	Wesselman	Episode: "Lesson in Anatomy"
1968–1971	ITV Playhouse	Various	3 episodes
1969	The Champions	American Colonel	Episode: "Autokill"
1969	Department S	President of the USA (voice)	Episode: "The Last Train to Redbridge"
1969	Counterstrike	General	Episode: "Joker One"
1970	Ace of Wands	Mr. America	Episode: "One and One and One are Four Part Three"
1970–1974	Special Branch	Lester Swift/Evans	2 episodes
1971–1973	ITV Saturday Night Theatre	American Tourist/The Client	2 episodes
1972	BBC Play of the Month	Dr. Buchanan	Episode: "Summer and Smoke"
1972–1974	The Onedin Line	Captain Franks/Draygon	2 episodes
1973	Madigan	Vern	Episode: "The Lisbon Beat"
1973	Crown Court	Morton Lass	Serial: "Sunset of Arms"
1973	The Rivals of Sherlock Holmes	Freeling Poignton	Episode: "The Secret of the Magnifique"
1973	Warship	McFie	Episode: "Hot Pursuit"
1973	Marked Personal	Richardson	2 episodes
1974	Who Killed Lamb?	Professor Friedland	TV film
1975	Thriller	Hanley	Episode: "Good Salary – Prospects – Free Coffin"
1975	Whodunnit?	Lazlo Bretz	Episode: "Too Many Crooks"
1976	Z-Cars	Chuck Parker	Episode: "Kidnap"
1976–1977	Yanks Go Home	Sergeant Gus Pulaski	
1977	The New Avengers	Mahon	Episode: "Trap"
1978	The Professionals	John Jerry Patterson	Episode: "Heroes"
1978	Lillie	Joaquin Miller	Episode: "The New Helen"
1978	Play for Today	Arthur Bates	Episode: "Nina"
1979	Fawlty Towers	Mr Hamilton	Episode: "Waldorf Salad"
1979	Leave it to Charlie	Glenn Rickenbacker	Episode: "Ole Brown Eyes"
1979	The Omega Factor	Masson	Episode: "After-Image"
1980	Turtle's Progress	J.B. Grimsdell	1 episode
1981	Metal Mickey	Saloon Barman	Episode: "Marshall Mickey"
1981	BBC2 Playhouse	Charlie Oakhampton	Episode: "Virginia Fly is Drowning"
1981–1983	Astronauts	Beadle	13 episodes
1982	A Woman Called Golda	Mr. Macy	TV film
1983	Philip Marlowe, Private Eye	Don Luigi	Episode: "The Pencil"
1983	Hart to Hart	William Eady	Episode: "Passing Chance"
1984	Lace	Mr. Hale	2 episodes
1984	The First Olympics: Athens 1896	President Francis Patton	2 episodes
1984	Cold Warrior	Colonel Elliott	Episode: "What's Good for General Bullmoose"
1984	Remington Steele	Wallace Carlisle	Episode: "Maltese Steele"
1984	Ellis Island	Doctor Moore	TV Mini-series
1985	The Dirty Dozen: Next Mission	US Colonel	TV film
1985	John and Yoko: A Love Story	Houston Lawyer	TV film
1986	Dempsey & Makepeace	Coltrane	Episode: "The Burning (2-part)"
1986–1990	Howards' Way	Robert Hudson	3 episodes
1987–1989	Screen Two	Channel President/Dean Webb	2 episodes
1987	The Two Mrs. Grenvilles	Hunnicutt	2 episodes
1987	Hold the Dream	Dale Stevens	First episode
1988	Tales of the Unexpected	Mr. Groober	Episode: "The Verger"
1988	The Bourne Identity	Senator Crawford	2 episodes
1989	Starting Out	Chairman	Episode: "A Piece of the Cake"
1989	Anything More Would Be Greedy	Brock Cashman	Episode: "Georgian Silver"
1989	The Nightmare Years	Nick Roosevelt	4 episodes
1991	Deadly Betrayal: The Bruce Curtis Story	Al Podgis	TV film
1992	E.N.G.	Dirk Jackman	Episode: "After the Fire"
1992–1993	Road to Avonlea	Mr. Harrison	2 episodes
1993	The Young Indiana Jones Chronicles	Ambassador Kerens	Episode: "Vienna, November 1908"
1993	JFK: Reckless Youth	Admiral Dodson	2 episodes
1994	Scarlett	Minister	First episode
1995	As Time Goes By	Young Rocky	Episode: "Improvements"
1997	Kavanagh QC	Governor Stamford Cotton	Episode: "In God We Trust"
