= Constantine Gregory =

American actor, dialect coach and voice actor

Constantine Gregory (born Constantine Liebert, September 16, 1942) is an American actor, dialect coach, and voice actor. Until 1983 he was usually credited as Constantin de Goguel.

== Life and career ==
He was born of a Dutch father and Russian–born mother. On their divorce, he was given his mother's surname of de Goguel. His mother was born in 1920 in Sebastopol with the White Army during the Russian Civil War, and in 1925 was smuggled out to England, where she was brought up. She studied acting briefly under Michael Chekhov at Dartington, but when his school broke up with the outbreak of war, she then later went to America and worked as a personal assistant to Edward James. She married Onno Liebert (Leebaert) in 1941. Liebert was a journalist and broadcaster who escaped the occupied Netherlands on a bicycle.

Gregory came to England with his mother in 1950 and then attended Dartington Hall School (1950–1961), followed by Trinity College, Dublin (1961–1965) where he read Economics and Political Science. He became President of Trinity College Players and in 1965 went with them to the Edinburgh Festival with a hugely successful late night revue directed by Max Stafford-Clark at the Traverse Theatre founded by Jim Haynes which had then only been going for two years.

His first professional job was as the back legs of Alfred the Horse in the annual Christmas production of Toad of Toad Hall in London's West End. He also understudied Mr Toad, and played Fat-Face the Policeman. Then he followed the usual path of actors in British theatre with stints in repertory at the Opera House, Harrogate, the Theatre Royal Windsor, amongst others, as well as playing a Blue Fairy in A Midsummer Night's Dream at the Open Air Theatre, Regent's Park, where he understudied Oberon. He performed at the Everyman Theatre Liverpool, toured in a musical directed by Michael Bogdanov, who had been a University contemporary. Constantine joined the Royal Shakespeare Company under Trevor Nunn for the "Roman season" of Coriolanus, Julius Caesar, Antony and Cleopatra and Titus Andronicus. (He later appeared as Aemelius in Julie Taymor's film, Titus). In Jean-Louis Barrault's acclaimed production of Rabelais at the Round House Theatre London, Constantine played the leading part of the MC. He also appeared at the Royal Court Theatre in Keith Hack's production of The Good Woman of Szechuan with Janet Suzman, Ian McDiarmid and Jonathan Kent.

Meanwhile, his film and television career was taking off, thanks largely to his speaking fluent Russian at a time when Cold War spy stories were popular. Finding that he was being type cast as a "foreigner", he took on the professional surname of Gregory, and started getting more varied roles. His facility for accents and languages saw him portray not only Russians, but Americans, Germans, Spaniards and even a Moroccan. This vocal ability made him in demand as a "voice" in recording ADR, or "dubbing" feature films. He has now done this work, as a voice and group director, on over 350 films. This in turn led to being asked to dialogue coach the TV mini-series Mussolini: The Untold Story with George C. Scott and many other stars, including the young Robert Downey, Jr. and Lee Grant. A parallel career to acting stemmed from this when he was asked to dialogue coach on Bernardo Bertolucci's Oscar-winning film The Last Emperor (1987), in which he also played "The Oculist". He worked on two further movies with Bertolucci, Little Buddha (1994) and The Dreamers (2003). Gregory's skills as a dialogue coach have been mostly used with non-Anglo actors who need to act in English, and in establishing dialect conventions with multi-national casts. He has worked with many distinguished directors and international stars in this capacity, as well as the most distinguished actors in many countries, while continuing to act in feature films and TV movies. Constantine has also worked on radio for the BBC and made many audio story recordings, latterly several for Spoken Ink. Gregory has been married and divorced twice, has two daughters and a son, and lives in London and Hove. He has dual nationality UK/US and speaks fluent Russian and French with a knowledge of Italian, Spanish and German.

== Selected filmography ==
- Before Winter Comes (1969) - Russian Corporal
- The Revolutionary (1970)
- The McKenzie Break (1970) - Lt. Hall
- There's a Girl in My Soup (1970) - Michel Le Guestier
- Diamonds Are Forever (1971) - Aide to Metz (uncredited)
- The Tamarind Seed (1974) - Dimitri Memenov
- Antony and Cleopatra (1974, TV Movie) - Ventidius
- Alfie Darling (1975) - Police Inspector
- Russian Roulette (1975) - Samuel
- Inside Out (1975) - Col. Kosnikov
- To the Devil a Daughter (1976) - Kollde
- Emily (1976) - Rupert Wain
- Voyage of the Damned (1976) - Navigation Officer
- Yanks Go Home (1977) - Father Pugh, Episode: "Bed Of Roses"
- The Stud (1978) - Lord Newton
- The Class of Miss MacMichael (1978) - Maj. Brady
- Meetings with Remarkable Men (1979) - Captain
- Leave it to Charlie (1980) - Actor, Episode: "The Old Flame"
- Loophole (1981) - 2nd Interviewer
- Enter the Ninja (1981) - Mr. Parker
- A Flame to the Phoenix (1983) - Waclaw Ranczowski
- Maschenka (1987) - Pyotr
- The Last Emperor (1987) - Oculist
- Shadow of China (1989) - Jameson
- The Russia House (1990) - KGB Interviewer
- Back in the USSR (1992) - Stanley
- GoldenEye (1995) - Russian Computer Store Manager
- England, My England (1995) - Colonel Wharton
- Gregory's Two Girls (1999) - Rudy (uncredited)
- Titus (1999) - Aemelius
- The Sum of All Fears (2002) - General Bulgakov
- Shanghai Knights (2003) - The Mayor of New York City
- Infinite Justice (2006) - Abe Kautsky
- Flawless (2007) - Dmitriev
- Thick as Thieves (2009) - Boris Sergeev
- Blood: The Last Vampire (2009) - Mr. Henry
- Night Train (2009) - Mr. Gutman
- Showreel (2011) - Father
- 6 Underground (2019) — Four Horsemen
- Wonder Woman 1984 (2021) — Russian General
- The King's Man (2021) — Mayor of Sarajevo
- For All Mankind (2023) — Artem
