= Suzanne Danielle =

British actress (born 1957)

- Born: Suzanne Morris; 14 January 1957 (age 69); London, England
- Occupations: Film, television actress
- Years active: 1974–1985
- Spouse: Sam Torrance (m. 1995)
- Children: 4

Suzanne Morris (born 14 January 1957), known professionally as Suzanne Danielle, is an English former film and television actress.

== Early life ==
Danielle was born Suzanne Morris in 1957, before changing her surname.

She trained as a dancer at the Bush Davies School of Theatre Arts in her home town of Romford in Essex, and also attended Bedfords Park Community School in Straight Road, Harold Hill. At the age of 16, she appeared in the West End musical Billy (1974), starring Michael Crawford. As a result of that she was invited to appear as a dancer on a Bruce Forsyth show called Bruce and More Girls. An admirer of Cyd Charisse, after leaving school Danielle joined a dance group called The Younger Generation.

== Screen career ==
Danielle's first screen role as an actress was as "Pretty Girl" in an episode of The Professionals ("Killer with a Long Arm"), broadcast in January 1978. Her first film role was in The Wild Geese (1978), but her first credited part, in the same year, was in Carry On Emmannuelle, the last film in the original Carry On... series. One reviewer commented "Many of the stalwarts are featured but, apart from Kenneth Williams, they are reduced to support for the eponymous heroine in the athletic and long-legged person of Suzanne Danielle".

Also that year she filmed The Golden Lady, playing a leading part alongside Ina Skriver; the movie was released in 1979. In Arabian Adventure (also 1979) she plays a dancer and does a belly dance for Christopher Lee's Caliph.

Her last film was The Trouble with Spies (1987, but filmed in 1984), in which she played opposite Donald Sutherland and Michael Hordern.

== Television ==
In the late 1970s and early 1980s, Danielle was reported to have "the monopoly on attractive, promiscuous good-time girls". She was a regular face on British television between 1979 and 1983. She was a team member on the TV game show Give Us a Clue and appeared in many other light entertainment shows, including the Christmas 1984 edition of Blankety Blank. As an actress, she appeared in Doctor Who (in the story Destiny of the Daleks), Hammer House of Horror, Morecambe and Wise, Tales of the Unexpected and became a frequent contributor to the Mike Yarwood series on ITV during the early 1980s, portraying Diana, Princess of Wales, opposite Yarwood's impersonation of Prince Charles.

== Theatre ==
She took to the theatre in 1980, in a touring production of John Murray's two-person comedy The Monkey Walk, opposite Patrick Mower. This travelled as far afield as Singapore and New Zealand.

In 1983, she starred in an exercise instruction album on vinyl and cassette, in the Shape Up and Dance series.

In 1985, Danielle played the lead in a Christmas pantomime of Jack and the Beanstalk at Richmond, Surrey, supported by Jimmy Edwards, Kenneth Connor and Joan Sims.

== Personal life ==
Danielle was in a relationship with the actor Patrick Mower for seven years. In 1986, she met golfer Sam Torrance, who proposed to her in 1987 on a Concorde flight on the way to play in the Ryder Cup in Columbus, Ohio, US. They were married on 14 February 1995 at Skibo Castle. They have four children.

== Filmography ==
- The Stud (1978) – Disco dancer (uncredited)
- The Wild Geese (1978) – Girl at party (uncredited)
- Long Shot (1978) – Sue
- Carry On Emmannuelle (1978) – Emmannuelle Prevert
- Arabian Adventure (1979) – Eastern Dancer
- The Golden Lady (1979) – Dahlia
- Sir Henry at Rawlinson End (1980) – Candice Rawlinson
- Flash Gordon (1980) – Serving Girl
- The Boys in Blue (1982) – Kim
- Escape from El Diablo (1984) – Pilar
- The Trouble with Spies (1987) – Maria Sola

== Television ==
- The Professionals - "Killer with a Long Arm" (1978) – "Pretty Girl"
- Morecambe and Wise Show – various appearances
- Doctor Who - Destiny of the Daleks (1979) – "Agella"
- Give Us a Clue – regular guest, 1979–83
- Hammer House of Horror - "Carpathian Eagle" (1980) – Natalie
- Tales of the Unexpected - "Hijack" (1981) as Millie, and "Pattern of Guilt" (1982) as Elaine Briscoe
- Jane (1982) – Lola Pagola
- Mike Yarwood in Persons (1981) – Diana, Princess of Wales
- Strangers (1982) - Gail Merrian
- Royal Variety Performance – 8 November 1982
- Just Amazing (1983) - host
- Blankety Blank - 25 December 1984
