= Oscar Tschirky =

American hotel manager (1866–1950)

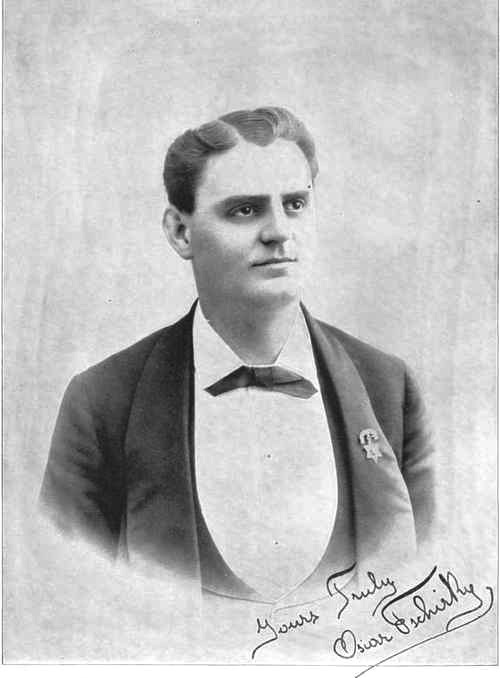
- Tschirky in New York City c. 1885
- Born: Oscar Michel Tschirky; September 28, 1866; Le Locle, Switzerland
- Died: November 6, 1950 (aged 84); New Paltz, New York, U.S.
- Other name: Oscar of the Waldorf
- Occupations: Restaurateur, hotelier, gentleman farmer, cookbook author
- Years active: 1887–1950
- Known for: Being Maître d'hôtel of Delmonico's and Waldorf Astoria New York
- Spouse: Sophia "Sophie" Bertisch (m. 1887; died 1939)
- Children: 4

Oscar Michel Tschirky (September 28, 1866 – November 6, 1950) colloquially known as Oscar of the Waldorf was a Swiss-born American restaurateur, hotelier, gentleman farmer and cookbook author who was primarily known as Maître d'hôtel of Delmonico's Restaurant and subsequently the Waldorf-Astoria Hotel in Manhattan, New York.

== Early life and education ==
Tschirky was born September 28, 1866 in Le Locle, Switzerland, the youngest of three children, to August Carl Tschirky (1825–1890), an emigration and credit agent, and Antonia Tschirky (née Fassbind; 1832–1925). He had an older brother and sister as well as a half-brother from his fathers first marriage.

The Tschirky family was originally from Weisstannen which belonged to the municipality of Mels, St. Gallen. His mother was from Lucerne. In the late 1850s, the family relocated to Romandy, where they settled in La Chaux-de-Fonds operating an agency for emigration and credit but also a household staffing agency.

He attended the local schools in La Chaux-de-Fonds and then was sent to work for a farmer in Fribourg, together with his older brother Brutus, who was seven years his senior. Brutus emigrated to the United States shortly thereafter and encouraged his brother to follow him. Tschirky arrived in New York City on May 14, 1883 aboard S.S Silesia.

== Career ==
In 1883, a 17-year-old Tschirky, arrived in New York City one day before the Brooklyn Bridge officially opened. His brother, Brutus Tschirky, was a chief assistant at Brunswick Hotel, but this establishment did not have any openings at the time. Hence, Oscar ultimately became a busboy, or commis waiter, in the Hoffman House, only about seven hours after his arrival in the city. His initial earnings were $18 per month (approximately $600 in modern equivalency). He rose quickly to other positions which included first managerial duties, organizing events as well as stints at reception and accounting. Ultimately he became the ship steward on the boat of Cassius H. Read, the proprietor of the Hoffman House and Brunswick Hotel.

In 1887, Tschirky began working for Delmonico's on Fifth Avenue, where he initially was at the bar and later in bussing. He ultimately became Maître d'hôtel of the restaurant and at that time, aged 21, was already relatively well known in the local hospitality industry and financially comfortable. In 1890, shortly before opening, he applied for the position of Maître d'hôtel at Waldorf Hotel where he was hired by George Boldt, then the general manager, in 1891. He received countless recommendation letters by prominent people which lead to his success. Ultimately he was nicked "Oscar of the Waldorf". In 1897, Tschirky began working in the newly opened and even more grand Waldorf Astoria, which was newly opened after the success of the first one. He participated in the rise of exclusive restaurants.

Although he had never worked as a chef, he capitalized on his association with the restaurant. He published a large cookbook. He is also pictured on a relish bottle displayed in the lobby of the Waldorf-Astoria, along with other photos of him at the major events during his tenure as maître d'hôtel. He is credited with having created Waldorf salad and for aiding in the popularization of Thousand Island dressing. Tschirky is also credited by some with developing the preparation of Eggs Benedict, although differing accounts make this hard to confirm.

Cornell University holds the Oscar Tschirky papers and his noted collection of menus (Cornell University School of Hotel Administration). Most of Oscar Tschirky's recollections therein are devoted to the Waldorf-Astoria Hotel and its founder, George C. Boldt, and his wife, Louise Kehrer Boldt.

== Personal life ==
In 1887, Tschirky married German-born Sophia "Sophie" Bertisch (1865–1939), a daughter of Johannes Bertisch and Magdalena Bertisch (née Wisch), originally of Hasloch, Bavaria, Germany. Her sister, Katie Bertisch, was married to Oscars brother Brutus, without issue. They had four children:

- Olga Tschirky (1888–1888)
- August Caesar Tschirky (1889–1952), a dairy farmer in New Paltz, New York, married firstly to Elsa Hiltebrant (1889–1962) and secondly to Ann Christine Rosecrans (1888–1946), both marriages without issue.
- Leopold Tschirky (1891–1960), an executive in the steel industry, married to Florence T. Gerken, they had one son.
- Lulu Clover Tschirky (1897–1941), married firstly to Leon Edward Chambers (born 1893), with whom she had one daughter. She secondly married Ira Zimmerman (1894–1975).

Tschirky reportedly submitted his declaration of intention (first papers) within an hour of arrival in New York City and became a naturalized U.S. citizen in 1888.

In 1889, Tschirky acquired a 320-acre farm on the Wallkill River in New Paltz, where he organized picnics for family, friends or fellow chefs and usually spent the summer months (to some other accounts the farm was referred to as Oscar's Farm and encompassed 1,000 acres). In the 1940s, he sold the property to Société Culinaire Philantrophique, a philanthropic group of French-speaking chefs, who turned it into a retirement home. By 1910, Tschirky was independently wealthy and besides his farm owned a townhouse on Lexington Avenue.

Tschirky passed away on November 6, 1950 in New Paltz, New York aged 84.
