= Richard Oldfield =

American film and television actor (born 1950)

Richard Oldfield (born 1950) is an American film and television actor who has worked mostly in Britain.

Born in the US, Oldfield moved to Britain in the 1960s. His stage debut was in the musical Hair at the Shaftesbury Theatre in London's West End in 1969. This was followed by a screen appearance in ITV's Thriller (1973), and his first feature film was Emily (1976), in which he played an American visitor pursuing Emily (Koo Stark). Between 1976 and 1977 he appeared as Burford Puckett of the United States Air Force in the British television serial Yanks Go Home. In 1979 he was in The Golden Lady opposite Ina Skriver, with whom he had also worked in Emily.

In 1980 Oldfield became a minor but notable figure in the Star Wars saga, appearing as Rebel fighter pilot Hobbie Klivian in The Empire Strikes Back and delivering the line to Carrie Fisher “Two fighters against a Star Destroyer?”

In 1981 he was Brother Simeon in Omen III: The Final Conflict and went on to appear in Ragtime (1981), The Lords of Discipline (1983), Scream for Help (1984), The Razor's Edge (1984), and Lifeforce (1985).

== Film and television credits ==
- Thriller: Ring Once for Death (1973) : Piers Fane
- Emily (1976) : James Wise
- Yanks Go Home (1976-1977) : Burford Puckett
- The Golden Lady (1979) : Wayne Bentley
- The Martian Chronicles (1980) : Captain Nathaniel York
- Star Wars The Empire Strikes Back (1980) : Rebel Derek “Hobbie” Klivian (Rogue 4)
- Omen III: The Final Conflict (1981) : Brother Simeon
- Ragtime (1981) : Stock Reporter
- The Lords of Discipline (1983) : TAC Officer
- Scream for Help (1984) : Policeman
- The Razor's Edge (1984) : Doug Van Allen
- Lifeforce (1985) : Mission Leader
- From the Mouths of Babes (documentary, 2016) : Himself
- The Allman Brothers Band: Live at Great Woods (documentary, 1992) : production assistant
- The Singing Forest (2003) : synchronization representative and post-production consultant (as Rich Oldfield)
