= Punch drunk (disambiguation) =

Punch drunk syndrome is the medical condition chronic traumatic encephalopathy.

Punch drunk, punchdrunk, or punch-drunk may also refer to:

- Punch Drunk (TV series), an English TV programme
- Punchdrunk (theatre company), an English theatre company
  - Punchdrunk International, a subsidiary production company
- Punch Drunks, a 1934 film by the Three Stooges
- "Punch Drunk", a 2018 episode of F Is for Family
- "Punch Drunk", a song by Lauren Mayberry from her 2024 album Vicious Creature
- "Punch Drunk", a song by Kanye West from his 2026 album Bully

== See also ==
- Punch-Drunk Love, a 2002 film by Paul Thomas Anderson
