= Sarah Brackett =

American actress (1938–1996)

- Born: Sarah Evershed Brackett; May 13, 1938; Lake Forest, Illinois, United States
- Died: July 3, 1996 (aged 58); Westminster, London, United Kingdom
- Occupation: Actress
- Years active: 1963–1987

Sarah Evershed Brackett (13 May 1938 – 3 July 1996) was an American-born television and film actress who worked mostly in Britain.

Brackett's parents were William Oliver Brackett, a Presbyterian minister, and his wife Nancy Alexis Thompson, who had been born in Scotland. They were married in Edinburgh in 1931, and Brackett was born in Lake Forest, Illinois. In 1945, her father died, and her mother decided to return home, so that from the age of seven Brackett was brought up in Scotland. She trained for an acting career at the Edinburgh College of Speech and Drama. Her entry in Spotlight in 1966 reported that she spoke fluent French and German.

Brackett began her career in the theatre. In 1960 she was in repertory at the Byre Theatre in St Andrews, and in 1961 played Portia in a production of The Merchant of Venice at the Colchester Repertory Theatre. She also appeared in West End musicals, including A Funny Thing Happened on the Way to the Forum at the Strand Theatre, and in a production of Funny Girl at the Prince of Wales in 1966 she played Vera, a showgirl.

She last worked as an actress in the late 1980s. On 3 July 1996, she was found dead, aged 58, in her flat in Westminster, London. The cause of death was found to be suicide and the date was estimated as 17 June.

== Filmography ==
- The Saint, episode "The Element of Doubt" (1962): Nurse
- Hugh and I, episode "April in Paris" (1963): Check-in Clerk
- The Third Secret (1964): Nurse
- The Saint, episode "The Unkind Philanthropist" (1964): Tristan Brown
- The Masque of the Red Death (1964): Grandmother
- Danger Man (1965): Annette / Glover's secretary
- BBC Play of the Month Lee Oswald: Assassin (1966): Katherine Mallory
- Funeral in Berlin (1966): Babcock
- George and the Dragon, episode "The French Lesson" (1967): Air Hostess
- Battle Beneath the Earth (1967): Meg Webson
- Detective, episode "Deaths on the Champs-Élysées" (1968): Valerie Dupont
- The Portrait of a Lady (television series, 1968): Henrietta Stackpole
- The Way We Live Now (television series, 1969): Mrs Hurtle
- Counterstrike (1969 BBC television series): Mary
- The Golden Bowl (1972, TV series): Mrs. Rance
- Sex Play (1974): Harriet Best
- The Doll (1975): 3-part television series): Linda Braithwaite
- Katy (television series, 1976): Mrs Florence
- The Awakening of Emily (1976): Margaret Foster
- Oppenheimer (1980 miniseries): Priscilla Duffield
- Priest of Love (1981): Achsah Barlow Brewster
- The Lords of Discipline (1983): Mrs Durrell
- The Old Men at the Zoo (1983): Reporter at White House
- Scream for Help (1984): School Secretary
- What Mad Pursuit? (1985): Lady at Literary Luncheon
- Odyssée d'amour (1987)
