= Waldorf Salad (Fawlty Towers) =

- Fawlty Towers episode
- Basil Fawlty attending to Mr and Mrs Hamilton
- Episode no.: Series 2 Episode 3
- Directed by: Bob Spiers
- Written by: John Cleese; Connie Booth
- Editing by: Neil Pittaway
- Original air date: 5 March 1979
- Running time: 35 minutes

Guest appearances
- Bruce Boa as Mr Hamilton; Claire Nielson as Mrs Hamilton; Norman Bird as Mr Arrad; Stella Tanner as Mrs Arrad; June Ellis as Mrs Johnston; Terence Conoley as Mr Johnston; Anthony Dawes as Mr Libson; Dorothy Frere as Miss Hare; Beatrice Shaw as Miss Gurke

Episode chronology
← Previous "The Psychiatrist"	Next → "The Kipper and the Corpse"

"Waldorf Salad" is the third episode of the second series of the British television sitcom Fawlty Towers. Written by John Cleese and Connie Booth and directed by Bob Spiers, it was first broadcast on BBC2 on 5 March 1979.

The episode revolves around the arrival of the Hamiltons, who bribe Basil into preparing a meal for them, despite Terry the chef having left the hotel. Determined to make a profit despite not knowing how to prepare the requested Waldorf salad, Basil pretends that the chef is still in the kitchen, while having to prepare the meal himself.

The episode is regarded as being "massively popular" and well-received overseas. Its humour is derived from the cultural differences of American and British people.

== Plot ==
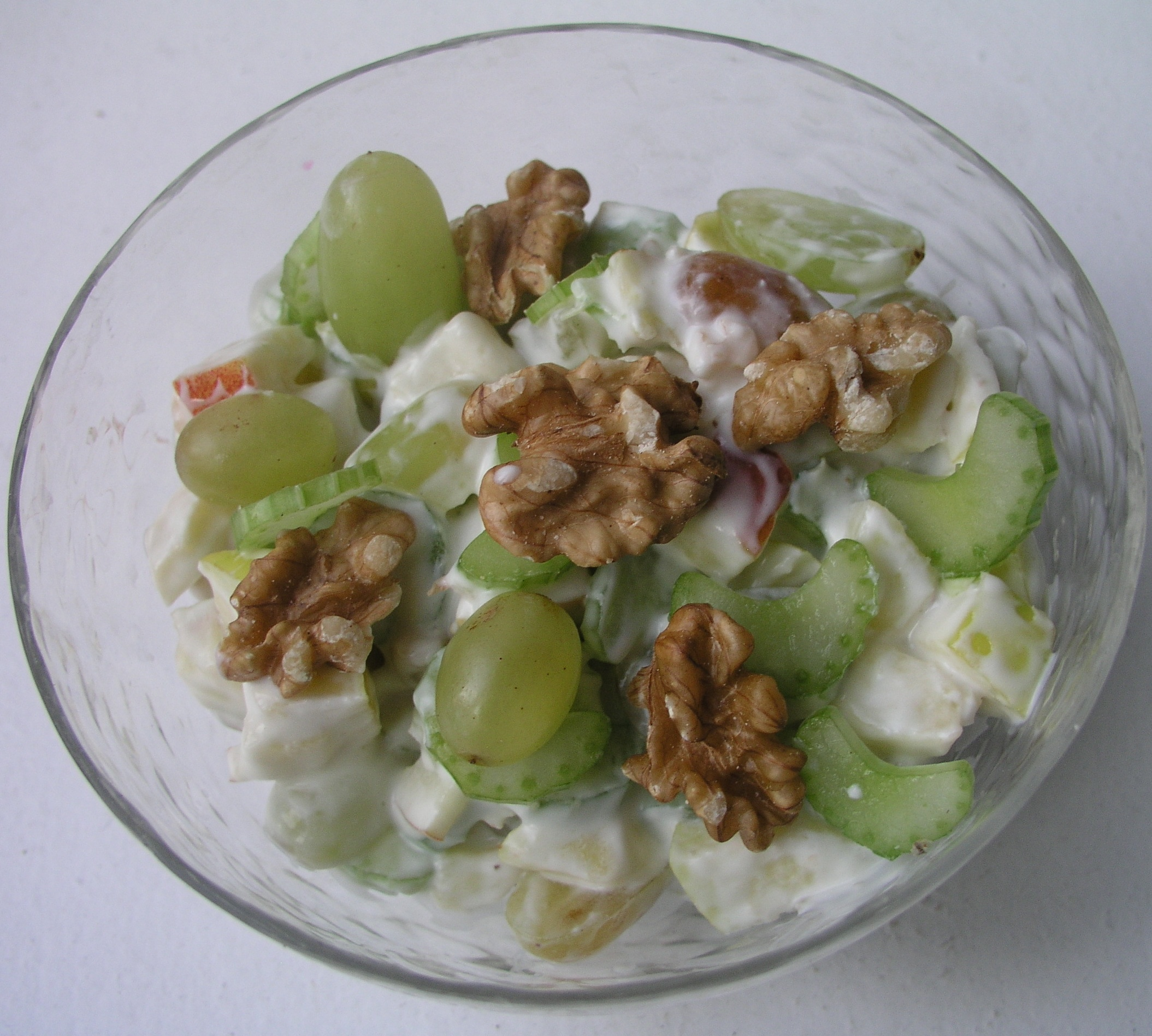
A Waldorf salad

Dinner time is exceptionally busy at the hotel and the guests complain about the quality of the service. However, when Basil checks with the guests, they do not mention their complaints. As service is winding down, a new couple arrives, Mr and Mrs Hamilton. While Mrs Hamilton is British, her husband is American, and gives vent to a list of complaints about their travels from London, when compared to the United States. Because of their late arrival, Mr Hamilton asks Basil to bribe the cook to keep the kitchen open so they can have a meal after they have unpacked. Basil attempts to trick Terry, the chef, by giving him only half of what Mr Hamilton has paid. Terry agrees, but claims it will cause him to miss a karate class. However, Polly reveals that she, Terry, Manuel, and Terry's Finnish girlfriend are about to have a night out. Irritated by Terry's fib, Basil sends them on their way, saying he will cook for the Hamiltons himself.

The Hamiltons first ask for screwdrivers, of which Basil has never heard, irritating Mr Hamilton. He asks for a Waldorf salad, an item not on the menu, followed by two rare steaks. Basil similarly has no idea how to make a Waldorf salad, and his attempts to make it are criticised by Mr Hamilton. Basil returns to the kitchen and shouts loudly as if he were yelling at Terry. Basil makes other excuses to the Hamiltons, unaware that Sybil has been able to prepare and serve the proper dish. Upon discovering this, Basil faux yells at the chef, but Sybil follows him into the kitchen and slaps him for his antics. Later, Basil reads a letter to the Hamiltons, supposedly from Terry, that places all the blame on the chef, but during the performance the unattended steaks start to burn. Basil returns to the kitchen and pretends to berate the chef further, but this time Mr Hamilton follows Basil in and uncovers the ruse. He and his wife decide to leave soon after, appalled by Basil's antics.

When Basil tries to persuade the Hamiltons to stay by saying their steaks are almost ready, Mr Hamilton yells at Basil, stating the hotel is "the crummiest, shoddiest, most badly run hotel in Western Europe" and compares Basil to Donald Duck. Attracted by the noise, other guests gather, and Basil browbeats them into acknowledging the quality of his hotel. However, as he continues to argue with Mr Hamilton, the other guests start airing their own grievances. As he goes off to pack his bags, Mr Hamilton laughs at Basil, who snaps at the other guests and tells Sybil that either the guests go, or he does. Sybil stares at him. Basil stalks out of the hotel, only to return seconds later after he realises it is raining, and requests a room and breakfast in bed, complete with a Waldorf salad and "lashings of hot screwdriver".

== Cast ==
=== Main ===
- John Cleese as Basil Fawlty
- Prunella Scales as Sybil Fawlty
- Andrew Sachs as Manuel
- Connie Booth as Polly Sherman
- Ballard Berkeley as Major Gowen
- Brian Hall as Terry the Chef
- Gilly Flower as Miss Abitha Tibbs
- Renee Roberts as Miss Ursula Gatsby

=== Guest ===
- Bruce Boa as Mr (Harry) Hamilton
- Claire Nielson as Mrs Hamilton
- Norman Bird as Mr Arrad
- Stella Tanner as Mrs Arrad
- June Ellis as Mrs Johnston
- Terence Conoley as Mr Johnston
- Anthony Dawes as Mr Libson
- Dorothy Frere as Miss (Doris) Hare
- Beatrice Shaw as Miss Gurke

== Production ==
=== Development ===
The episode, which was originally titled "USA", was filmed on 21 January 1979 in Studio 1 of the BBC Television Centre. It was the first episode of the second series to be recorded, but aired as the third episode in the series.

Co-writer John Cleese believed that "the English don't know how to complain", a preposition that inspired this episode. "The whole point about 'Waldorf Salad' is that the Americans can do what the English can't. The English can't complain because we think it's going to be aggressive and something to do with losing your temper and losing face." Conversely, Cleese noted that "some Americans are capable of being very direct in a way that achieves the object without ever seeming rude. They can just assert themselves with the right degree of energy."

=== Casting ===
Bruce Boa, the Canadian-born actor who played American guest Mr Hamilton in this episode, had previously appeared in the British sitcom Yanks Go Home, playing American sergeant Gus Polaski. Norman Bird, who played Mr Arrad in this episode, had also appeared in that series. Bird had previously appeared in the 1973 Comedy Playhouse pilot "Elementary, My Dear Watson", which starred John Cleese as Sherlock Holmes. Terence Conoley had appeared in a previous episode of Fawlty Towers, 1975's "A Touch of Class", as hotel guest Mr Wareing.

== Reception ==
The episode has been described as being "massively popular" and a great commercial success internationally in the 1980s and 1990s. Its source of amusement derives from the cultural differences between the Americans and the British and the perceived differences in manners. The American is very rude in expecting food which is not on the menu and complaining about the service in contrast to the English guests who are very guarded when it comes to complaining. The book Great, Grand & Famous Hotels remarked that "Fawlty Towers is real to everybody who has ever worked in a hotel, anybody who has ever stayed in one, or anyone who has ever tried, unsuccessfully, to order a Waldorf salad." A scene from the episode, in which Basil is confused over Mr Hamilton's request for a Waldorf salad, is cited as an example of language misunderstandings between different cultures in the student textbook Understanding Language Through Humor. Bruce Boa's performance as Mr Hamilton has been praised as being one of the greatest guest performances in the series.

In 2022, a camera script of "Waldorf Salad" sold at East Bristol Auctions for a record amount of £12,000, beating the previous record held by "The Jolly Boys' Outing" script from Only Fools and Horses.
