= Auker =

Auker is a surname. Notable people with the surname include:

- Elden Auker (1910–2006), American baseball pitcher
- David Auker (born 1949), British actor
