= The Trouble with Spies =

1987 comedy film by Burt Kennedy

- Theatrical poster
- Directed by: Burt Kennedy
- Written by: Burt Kennedy
- Based on: Apple Spy in the Sky by Marc Lovell
- Starring: Donald Sutherland; Ned Beatty; Ruth Gordon; Lucy Gutteridge; Michael Hordern; Robert Morley
- Cinematography: Alex Phillips Jr.
- Edited by: Warner E. Leighton
- Music by: Ken Thorne
- Production company: HBO Pictures
- Distributed by: De Laurentiis Entertainment Group
- Release date: December 4, 1987
- Running time: 91 minutes
- Country: United States
- Language: English
- Budget: $6 million
- Box office: $205,507

The Trouble with Spies is a 1987 spy comedy film written and directed by Burt Kennedy, and starring Donald Sutherland and Ned Beatty.

The film was shot in 1984, but not released until three years later. It features veteran actress Ruth Gordon's final performances. It was also the final film of Suzanne Danielle.

== Plot ==
When secret agent George Trent goes missing, spy agency chief Angus sends inept colleague Appleton Porter to the isle of Ibiza to find out why.

Appleton meets a number of guests in Mona Lewis's hotel who were familiar with Trent, but none has a clue what became of him. Appleton himself is totally clueless, nearly being killed a number of times but surviving mainly due to pure dumb luck.

== Cast ==
- Donald Sutherland as Appleton Porter
- Ned Beatty as Harry Lewis
- Ruth Gordon as Mrs. Arkwright
- Lucy Gutteridge as Mona
- Michael Hordern as Jason Locke
- Suzanne Danielle as Maria Sola
- Robert Morley as Angus
- Gregory Sierra as Captain Sanchez

== Production ==
The film was financed entirely by Home Box Office, the first production of the pay cable channel’s new theatrical motion picture division. the film, initially titled Trouble at the Royal Rose, was greenlit in the Spring of 1983 and the film had a $6-million budget.

Michael Caine was initially offered $1 million to play the role of Appleton Porter However, Caine turned down the role and actor Donald Sutherland took the part instead.

Based on a novel titled "Apple spy in the sky", one of several spy spoof novels featuring agent Appelton-Porter by author Marc Lovell, all of which feature apple puns, the film was originally to be titled "Trouble at the Royal Rose" (being the name of the British-run Ibiza guesthouse where Appleton-Porter puts up), but by April 1984, it was announced that the title had changed to "The Trouble with Spys", using a deliberate misspelling supposedly because it would look better on theatre marquees. Nevertheless, the trailer "corrected" the spelling to 'spies', as did contemporary posters and as still do most current references, including IMDB and Rotten Tomatoes.

The poster illustration depicts a Volkswagen Beetle with convertible top yet the film only features the Citroën 2CV.
