= Norman Bird =

English actor (1924–2005)

- Bird in Cash on Demand (1961)
- Born: John George Norman Bird; 30 October 1924; Coalville, Leicestershire, England
- Died: 22 April 2005 (aged 80); Wolverhampton, England
- Years active: 1951–1996
- Spouse: Nona Blamire (m. 1953)
- Children: 2

John George Norman Bird (30 October 1924 – 22 April 2005) was an English character actor.

== Early life ==
Bird was born in Coalville, Leicestershire, England. A RADA graduate, he made his West End debut in Peter Brook's production of The Winter's Tale at the Phoenix Theatre in 1951. He was also a member of the BBC's Radio Drama Company. His first film appearance was as the foreman in An Inspector Calls (1954).

== Film career ==
He was a familiar face to British cinema audiences of the 1950s and 1960s, appearing in nearly 50 films such as The Angry Silence (1960), The League of Gentlemen (1960), Whistle Down the Wind (1961), Victim (1961) and Term of Trial (1962) with Laurence Olivier and The Hill with Sean Connery (1965).

== Television appearances ==
He had over 200 television appearances, notably as Mr Braithwaite in Worzel Gummidge (1979–81) and Mr Arrad in the Fawlty Towers episode "Waldorf Salad" (1979). His long list of credits include Steptoe and Son, Till Death Us Do Part, Rising Damp, Ever Decreasing Circles, Yes Minister, To Serve Them All My Days, All Creatures Great and Small, Z-Cars, Public Eye, The Saint, Department S, Randall and Hopkirk (Deceased) and Boon. In 1990 he appeared in Stay Lucky, with Dennis Waterman, which marked his 200th television appearance. One of his last film appearances was as a taxi driver in Richard Attenborough's Shadowlands (1993).

== Personal life ==
At 16 he left school and spent six months working in an office before studying at the Royal Academy of Dramatic Art. During the Second World War, he served with Royal Air Force, being demobbed in 1947.

He met his wife Nona Blamire (Joan Hood in radio's The Archers) in rep in Northampton. They married in 1953 and lived in Teddington for many years. In 1992 they moved to Bridgnorth, Shropshire, to be nearer to their two daughters and five grandchildren.

== Filmography ==
=== Film ===
Year	Title	Role	Notes
1954	An Inspector Calls	Foreman Jones-Collins	Uncredited
1957	A Woman of Property	Clerk of the court	TV film
1960	The Angry Silence	Roberts	
1960	The League of Gentlemen	Captain Frank Weaver	
1960	Man in the Moon	Herbert	
1961	The Secret Partner	Ralph Beldon	
1961	Very Important Person	Travers, Senior British Officer	
1961	Whistle Down the Wind	Eddie	
1961	Victim	Harold Doe	
1961	Cash on Demand	Arthur Sanderson	
1962	Night of the Eagle	Doctor	
1962	Term of Trial	Mr. Taylor	
1962	In Search of the Castaways	Senior Yacht Guard	
1963	The Mind Benders	Aubrey	
1963	The Punch and Judy Man	Reginald Fletcher	
1963	August for the People	Mr. Bolt	TV film
1963	Maniac	Salon	
1963	The Cracksman	Policeman	
1963	80,000 Suspects	Harold Davis	
1963	Bitter Harvest	Mr. Pitt	
1964	Hot Enough for June	Employment Exchange Clerk	Uncredited
1964	The Bargee	Albert Williams	
1964	The Beauty Jungle	Mr. Freeman	
1964	First Men in the Moon	Stuart	
1964	The Black Torment	Harris	
1965	The Hill	Commandant, Major. Horace Appleby	
1966	Sky West and Crooked	Cheeseman	
1966	The Wrong Box	Clergyman	
1968	A Dandy in Aspic	Copperfield	
1968	The Limbo Line	John Chivers	
1969	Oh! What a Lovely War	Training Sergeant	Uncredited
1969	All at Sea	Mr. Danvers	
1969	Run a Crooked Mile	Sergeant Hooper	TV film
1970	The Virgin and the Gypsy	Uncle Fred	
1970	The Rise and Rise of Michael Rimmer	Alderman Poot	
1970	Put Out More Flags	Geoffrey Bentley	TV film
1971	The Raging Moon	Dr. Matthews	
1971	Please Sir!	Reynolds	
1971	Hands of the Ripper	Police Inspector	
1972	Doomwatch	Brewer	
1972	Young Winston	Party Chairman	
1972	Ooh... You Are Awful	Warder Burke	
1975	King Arthur, the Young Warlord	Ambrose	Direct-to-video
1976	The Slipper and the Rose	Dress Shop Proprietor	
1978	The Medusa Touch	Major. Henry Morlar	
1978	Margie and Me	Cheeseman	Short
1978	The Lord of the Rings	Bilbo	Voice role
1981	Omen III: The Final Conflict	Dr. Philmore	
1981	If You Go Down in the Woods Today	Doctor	TV film
1982	A Voyage Round My Father	Ham	TV film
1982	The Ghost Downstairs	Mr. Morris	TV film
1984	This Office Life	Seeds	TV film
1985	On Your Way, Riley	Frank	TV film
1993	Shadowlands	Taxi Driver Witness	

=== Television ===
Year	Series	Role	Notes
1956	Whack-O!	S.A. Smallpiece	Series regular
1957	Kenilworth	Butterworth	1 episode
1958	The Black Arrow	Landlord	Episode: "The Arrow Strikes"
1958	The Diary of Samuel Pepys	Constable	Mini-series
1959	The Eustace Diamonds	Hotel Manager	1 episode
1959	Emergency Ward 10	Policeman	1 episode
1960	Probation Officer	Mr. Sprigett	1 episode
1960	ITV Playhouse	Auctioneer	Episode: "Independent Means"
1960	Boyd Q.C.	Mr. West	Episode: "The Time of Day"
1961	Boyd Q.C.	Police Sergeant	Episode: "The Season of the Year"
1961	Hamlet	Gravedigger	Episode: "The Dread Command: The Readiness Is All"
1961	Coronation Street	Frank Jackson	2 episodes
1961	Ghost Squad	The Gunsmith	Episode: "Assassin"
1961	The Pursuers	Clive	Episode: "The Accident"
1962	ITV Playhouse	Second Old Man	Episode: "The Jokers"
1962	ITV Playhouse	Tom Rogers	Episode: "Nuncle"
1962	Z-Cars	Smith	Episode: "Jail Break"
1962	ITV Play of the Week	George Bland	Episode: "A Lily in Little India"
1963	BBC Sunday-Night Play	Arnold Ramussen	Episode: "Trial Run"
1963	Maupassant	Cacheri	Episode: "The Inheritance"
1963	The Saint	George Hackett	Episode: "The Well Meaning Mayor"
1964	The Protectors	Barnaby	Episode: "No Forwarding Address"
1964	Drama 61-67	Father	Episode: "The Close Prisoner"
1964	Drama 61-67	Mr. Pile	Episode: "The Brick Umbrella"
1964	Thursday Theatre	Harry Lancaster	Episode: "The Cure for Love"
1964	Armchair Theatre	Charles Lincoln	Episode: "The Trial of Dr. Fancy"
1964	Gideon's Way	Superintendent Fred Lee	Episode: "To Catch a Tiger"
1964	Frankie Howerd		1 episode
1964	Z-Cars	Lowther	Episode: "A Place of Safety"
1965	Z-Cars	Frank Burroughs	Episode: "Checkmate"
1965	The Saint	Weems	Episode: "The Frightened Inn-Keeper"
1965	The Bed-Sit Girl		Episode: "The Air Hostess"
1965	The Sullavan Brothers	Arthur Green	Episode: "Put Them Away for Keeps"
1965	It's Not Me, It's Them!	Mr. Partridge	Mini-series
1965	Here's Harry		Episode: "The Tonic"
1965	Blackmail	Henry Cobb	Episode: "Cobb"
1965	The Avengers	Croft	Episode: "Silent Dust"
1965	No Hiding Place	Inspector Cartwright	Episode: "Pom-Pom"
1966	No Hiding Place	Arthur Johnson	Episode: "The Killing"
1966	Armchair Theatre	Spooner	Episode: "The Walls Came Tumbling Down"
1966	Theatre 625	William Oaks	Episode: "A Man Like That"
1966	Harry Worth	Fishwick	Episode: "Move Man Move"
1966	Mrs Thursday	Alfred Budge	Episode: "Honesty Is the Best Policy"
1966	Hugh and I		Episode: "Arabian Nights"
1966	ITV Play of the Week	Ronald Bradshaw	Episode: "The First Thing You Think Of"
1966	ITV Play of the Week	Dr. McTaggart	Episode: "The Tormentors"
1967	ITV Play of the Week	Henry Williams	Episode: "Nice to Have You Back"
1967	ITV Play of the Week	Uncle George	Episode: "A Brand New Scrubbing Brush"
1967	The Saint	Inspector Mitchell	Episode: "The Best Laid Schemes"
1967	The Baron	Inspector Macauley	Episode: "Roundabout"
1967	Z-Cars	Prebble	Episode: "Standard Procedure"
1967	Sanctuary	Bob Lord	Episode: "A Cup of Tea with the Fullers"
1967	Harry Worth	Mr. Varley	Episode: "What Ails You?"
1968	Harry Worth	Mr. Keenan	Episode: "Money to Burn"
1968	Harry Worth	Dr. Swinson	Episode: "Match of the Day"
1968	The Saint	Mr. Spode	Episode: "The Organisation Man"
1968	The Very Merry Widow	Mr. Jackson 1 and 2	Episode: "Wonderful, Wonderful Copenhagen"
1968	Half Hour Story	Harry	Episode: "The Pub Fighter"
1969	ITV Sunday Night Theatre	Father	Episode: "Takeover"
1969	Adventure Weekly	Mr. Potts	Episode: "Take-Over"
1969	Department S	Drayton	Episode: "The Ghost of Mary Burnham"
1969	W. Somerset Maugham	Arthur Low	Episode: "A Casual Affair"
1969	Dixon of Dock Green	Harold Milton	Episode: "The Brimstone Man"
1969	Randall and Hopkirk (Deceased)	Elliot	Episode: "But What a Sweet Little Room"
1970	Armchair Theatre	Walter	Episode: "Up Among the Cuckoos"
1970	The Mating Machine	Monty	Episode: "Flo and Monty and Henry... and Henry"
1970	Comedy Playhouse	Dad	Episode: "Mind Your Own Business"
1970	Steptoe and Son	Bank Manager	Episode: "Men of Property"
1970	Steptoe and Son	Mr. Dryson	Episode: "Without Prejudice"
1971	Hadleigh	Knockholt	Episode: "A Quiet Place in the Country"
1971	ITV Sunday Night Theatre	Walter	Episode: "The Wedding Gift"
1971	Budgie	Inspector Upton	Episode: "A Pair of Charlies"
1971	Paul Temple	Proud	Episode: "Paper Chase"
1971	Father, Dear Father	Trevor Couch	Episode: "The Naked Truth"
1971	The Guardians	Tom Henryson	Episode: "I Want You to Understand Me"
1971	Softly, Softly: Task Force	Samuel Tomkins	Episode: "Aberration"
1971	Suspicion	Harry Beardsley	Episode: "I Can See Your Lips Move"
1972	Jason King	Detective Inspector Fields	Episode: "It's Too Bad About Auntie"
1972	The Organization	Ken Grist	2 episodes
1972	His and Hers	Post Office Man	Episode: "Interference"
1972	Love Thy Neighbour	Mr. Granger	Episode: "Clarky Leaves"
1972	Till Death Us Do Part	Landlord	Episode: "Holiday in Bournemouth"
1972	Thirty-Minute Theatre	Arthur Pendlebury	Episode: "Tonight We Meet Arthur Pendlebury"
1972	Turnbull's Finest Half-Hour	Harold Hudson	1 episode
1972	Arthur of the Britons	Ambrose	Episode: "Arthur Is Dead"
1972	My Wife Next Door	Mr. Sweeting	Episode: "Joint Assignment"
1973	Comedy Playhouse	Inspector Street	Episode: "Elementary, My Dear Watson: The Strange Case of the Dead Solicitors"
1973	The Adventurer	Brooks	Episode: "Going, Going..."
1973	The Fenn Street Gang	Mr. Craven	Episode: "How to Handle a Woman"
1973	The Rivals of Sherlock Holmes	Inspector Trent	Episode: "The Looting of the Specie Room"
1973	Owen, M.D.	Harold Reynolds	Episode: "Water Under the Bridge"
1973	An Evening with Francis Howerd		2 episodes
1973	ITV Sunday Night Theatre	Stanley Nicholson	Episode: "Reckoning Day"
1973	Thirty Minutes Worth		1 episode
1973	Up the Workers	Sid Stubbins	
1973	The Adventures of Black Beauty	Rundle	Episode: "The Outcast"
1973	Armchair 30	Agency Man	Episode: "Ross Evan's Story"
1974	My Good Woman	George Stebbs	Episode: "Two of a Kind"
1974	Bless This House	Vet	Episode: "Money Is the Root Of..."
1974	Marked Personal	Lionel Mottram	2 episodes
1974	The Dick Emery Show		2 episode
1975	Crown Court	Garfield Lawrence	Episode: "Saboteur: Part 1"
1975	Public Eye	Arthur Biddle	Episode: "Lifer"
1975	Rising Damp	Vicar	Episode: "Things That Go Bump in the Night"
1976	Happy Ever After	Mr. Fletcher	Episode: "June's Day in Bed"
1976	Angels	Henry Rudolfs	Episode: "A Woman of Property"
1976	The Basil Brush Show		1 episode
1976	The Chiffy Kids	Farmer	Episode: "Pot Luck"
1976	CBS Children's Film Festival		Episode: "Chimpmates"
1976-1977	Yanks Go Home	Leonard Chambers	Series regular
1977	Two's Company	Mr. Bunn	Episode: "The Rubbish"
1977	The Mike Reid Show		3 episodes
1977	Seven Faces of Woman	Ken	Episode: "She: Carol"
1977	Raffles	Sergeant Holly	Episode: "A Bad Night"
1977	Miss Jones and Son	Dad	3 episodes
1977	Graham's Gang	Old Gentleman	Episode: "Camaraderie"
1978	All Creatures Great and Small	Farmer Benson	Episode: "Attendant Problems"
1978	Jackanory Playhouse	King	Episode: "The Princess Who Couldn't Laugh"
1978	Coronation Street	Joe Hibbert	2 episodes
1978	Do You Remember?	Eddie	Episode: "The Bonus"
1978	Life Begins at Forty	Dr. Gardiner	Episode: "Alarms and Excursions"
1978	Return of the Saint	Morgan	Episode: "Assault Force"
1978	Everyday Maths	Mr. Brook	Episode: "Time and Table"
1979	Fawlty Towers	Mr. Arrad	Episode: "Waldorf Salad"
1979	Thomas & Sarah	Gilbert	2 episodes
1979	The Glums	Office Manager	1 episode
1979	Sherlock Holmes and Doctor Watson	Anthony Denham	Episode: "A Motive for Murder"
1979-1981	Worzel Gummidge	Mr. Braithwaite	Series regular
1980	Take the High Road	Roger Primrose	
1980	The Jim Davidson Show		1 episode
1980	All Creatures Great and Small	Rob Benson	Episode: "Alarms & Excursions"
1980	Hammer House of Horror	Basil	Episode: "The Thirteenth Reunion"
1980	To Serve Them All My Days	Alderman Blunt	Recurring role
1981	Yes Minister	Brian Baker	Episode: "The Compassionate Society"
1981	Misfits	Harold Forbes	Episode: "Happy Ever After"
1981	Juliet Bravo	Knowles	Episode: "A Private Place"
1981	Winston Churchill: The Wilderness Years	Sir Maurice Hanley	Episode: "The Long Tide of Surrender"
1981	The Adventure Game	Captain Acteon	1 episode
1982	Legacy of Murder	Policeman	Episode: "Holy Smoke"
1982	Break Point	Major Houghton-Jones	Mini-series
1983	The Fourth Arm	Colonel Cole	1 episode
1983	The Gaffer	Town Clerk	Episode: "Council of War"
1984	Hammer House of Mystery and Suspense	Henry Bircher	Episode: "Black Carrion"
1985	Up the Elephant and Round the Castle	Man from British Rail	Episode: "The Taste of Money"
1985	One by One	Marcus Garnet	2 episodes
1985	High & Dry	Frank Short	Episode: "Pilot"
1986	The Practice	Cyril Fielding	1 episode
1986	Help!	Mr. Peabody	Episode: "A Grave Mistake"
1986	Lytton's Diary	Charles Adams	2 episodes
1986	Buddy	Mr. Normington	3 episodes
1987	Ever Decreasing Circles	Man	Episode: "The Footpath"
1989	Woof!	Mayor	Episode: "Heroes"
1990	After Henry		Episode: "Party Politics"
1990	Stay Lucky	George	Episode: "Bigamy Blues"
1991	Second Thoughts	Ted	Episode: "Found and Lost"
1992	Bookmark	Man on Bus	Episode: "Miss Pym's Day Out"
1992	Screen One	Radley	Episode: "Born Kicking"
1992	Boon	Bob Wooley	Episode: "Love or Money"
1992	Kinsey	Roy	2 episodes
1996	Screen Two	Grandfather	Episode: "Crossing the Floor"
1996	Spywatch	Mr. Jenkins	Series regular
