= Marie Masters =

American actress, writer, and director (born 1941)

- Born: Marie Mastruserio; February 4, 1941 (age 85); Cincinnati, Ohio, U.S.
- Education: Marian College
- Occupations: Actress; writer; director
- Years active: 1965-present
- Spouse(s): Jay Harris (divorced) Robert Lipton (m. 1983; div. 1988)
- Children: 2, including Jesse Harris

Marie Masters (born Marie Mastruserio; February 4, 1941) is an American actress, writer, and director. She is known for playing the role of Dr. Susan Stewart on the CBS Daytime soap opera As the World Turns (1968 to 1979, 1986 to 2010). She also worked as a staff writer on ATWT, beginning in 2001. She has directed theatrical productions and worked as an assistant director on Broadway shows. She was the assistant artistic director for The New Group, a nonprofit theater company.

== Early life ==
Masters was born on February 4, 1941 in Cincinnati, Ohio. She was raised in Mount Auburn. When she was ten years old, she attended her first play, a summer stock production, and became interested in acting. She was educated at St. George grade school and graduated from Our Lady of Angels St. Bernard in 1959.

Masters attended Marian College in Indiana after receiving a scholarship to study art history. During her college years, she performed in summer stock plays. In 1963, she graduated cum laude with a Bachelor of Arts degree. Masters moved to New York and studied acting with Wynn Handman and Uta Hagen. She was hired at Women's Wear Daily, working at the city desk.

== Career ==
In 1965, Masters played Louise Northcutt in the original Off-Broadway production of A Sound of Silence. She was cast as Hester Ferris on the CBS soap opera Love of Life, playing the role from 1966 to 1967. She was a "stand by" for the role of Marion in the original Broadway production of There's a Girl in My Soup (1967). Masters' regional theater credits include Hay Fever and The Trojan Women, both at the Long Wharf Theatre in New Haven. She also appeared in The Country Girl at the Bucks County Playhouse.

She was cast as Susan Stewart on the CBS soap opera As the World Turns in 1968. The character was a doctor and a recovering alcoholic. In her early years on the show, she was paired romantically with Dr. Dan Stewart. Masters was the fifth actress to play the role, replacing Leslie Perkins. Masters stayed on ATWT until April 1979.

In the early 1980s, Masters guest starred on Kate & Allie, Here's Boomer, and King's Crossing. In 1982, she briefly appeared as Helen Murdock on the ABC soap opera One Life to Live. She played Joni in the thriller film Slayground (1984), co-starring with Peter Coyote. She also played Karen Cromwell in the suspense film Scream for Help (1984).

Masters returned to As the World Turns as Dr. Susan Stewart, first airing on March 29, 1986. When she returned, the character of Susan had matured and had an adult daughter, Emily Stewart (Melanie Smith). In the early 1990s, Masters guest starred on The Baby-Sitters Club and Law & Order. In 1991, she appeared in an Off-Broadway play, Nothing to Dream About.

Masters became an assistant director on a Broadway production of Chekhov's Three Sisters in 1997. She worked as the assistant artistic director for The New Group, a nonprofit theater troupe. In December 1998, she directed the play Elliot Loves at New York's Orenda Theatre. She was switched to recurring status at As the World Turns in 1999.

She became a staff writer for As the World Turns in 2001. The show won the Daytime Emmy Award for Outstanding Drama Series Writing Team in 2001 and 2002. Masters made another guest appearance on Law & Order. In November 2001, she worked as an assistant director on a Broadway revival of The Women. In 2006, she was an assistant director on Broadway revivals of Barefoot in the Park and The Threepenny Opera. In May 2007, Masters directed the play Strangers Knocking for The New Group.

She appeared in the final episode of As the World Turns, airing September 17, 2010. Masters played Carol Calder in the drama film Archaeology of a Woman (2012), co-starring with Sally Kirkland.

== Personal life ==
Her first marriage was to Jay Harris, a lawyer. They had twins, Jesse Harris and Jenny Harris, born in 1969. Masters and Harris later divorced.

When Jenny was a child, she played Emily Stewart, the daughter of Masters' character on As the World Turns. Jenny Harris has been an executive producer on CNN's Lou Dobbs Tonight (when the show was titled Moneyline News Hour). In January 2000, she married CNBC market analyst David Faber. Masters' son Jesse is a musician. He won a Grammy Award in 2003 as a songwriter for Norah Jones.

In the 1970s, Masters had a relationship with John Reilly, who played Dan Stewart on As the World Turns. She also dated Larry Bryggman, who played Dr. John Dixon.

Masters met actor Robert Lipton when he played Jeff Ward on As the World Turns. They were married on January 15, 1983. They divorced in 1988. He is the brother of actress Peggy Lipton.

== Filmography ==
=== Film ===
Year	Title	Role	Notes
1970	A Day at the Beach		
1983	Slayground	Joni	
1984	Scream for Help	Karen Cromwell	
2012	Archaeology of a Woman	Carol Calder	
2012	Alter Egos	Waitress	

=== Television ===
Year	Title	Role	Notes
1966–1967	Love of Life	Hester Ferris	
1968	Another World	Missy Palmer	
1968	Premiere	Paula	Episode: "Higher and Higher, Attorneys at Law"
1968–1979, 1986–2010	As the World Turns	Dr. Susan Stewart	Contract role: 1968–1979, 1986–1999, Recurring role: 1999–2010
1980	Secrets of Midland Heights	Fran Hillard	Episode: "Decisions"
1981	Ramblin'Man	Carol	Episode: "On the Run"
1982	One Life to Live	Helen Murdock	Recurring role
1990	The Baby-Sitters Club	Dr. Peggy Johannsen	Episode: "Baby-Sitters Special Christmas"
1994; 2001	Law & Order	Mary Cushman; Laura Tinsdale	Episodes: "Breeder", "Armed Forces"

== Awards and nominations ==
Year	Award	Category	Title	Result	Ref.
1990	Soap Opera Digest Award	Outstanding Supporting Actress: Daytime	As the World Turns	Nominated	
1991	Soap Opera Digest Award	Outstanding Supporting Actress: Daytime	As the World Turns	Nominated	
1994	Soap Opera Digest Award	Outstanding Supporting Actress	As the World Turns	Nominated	
