= Waldorf salad =

Fruit and nut salad

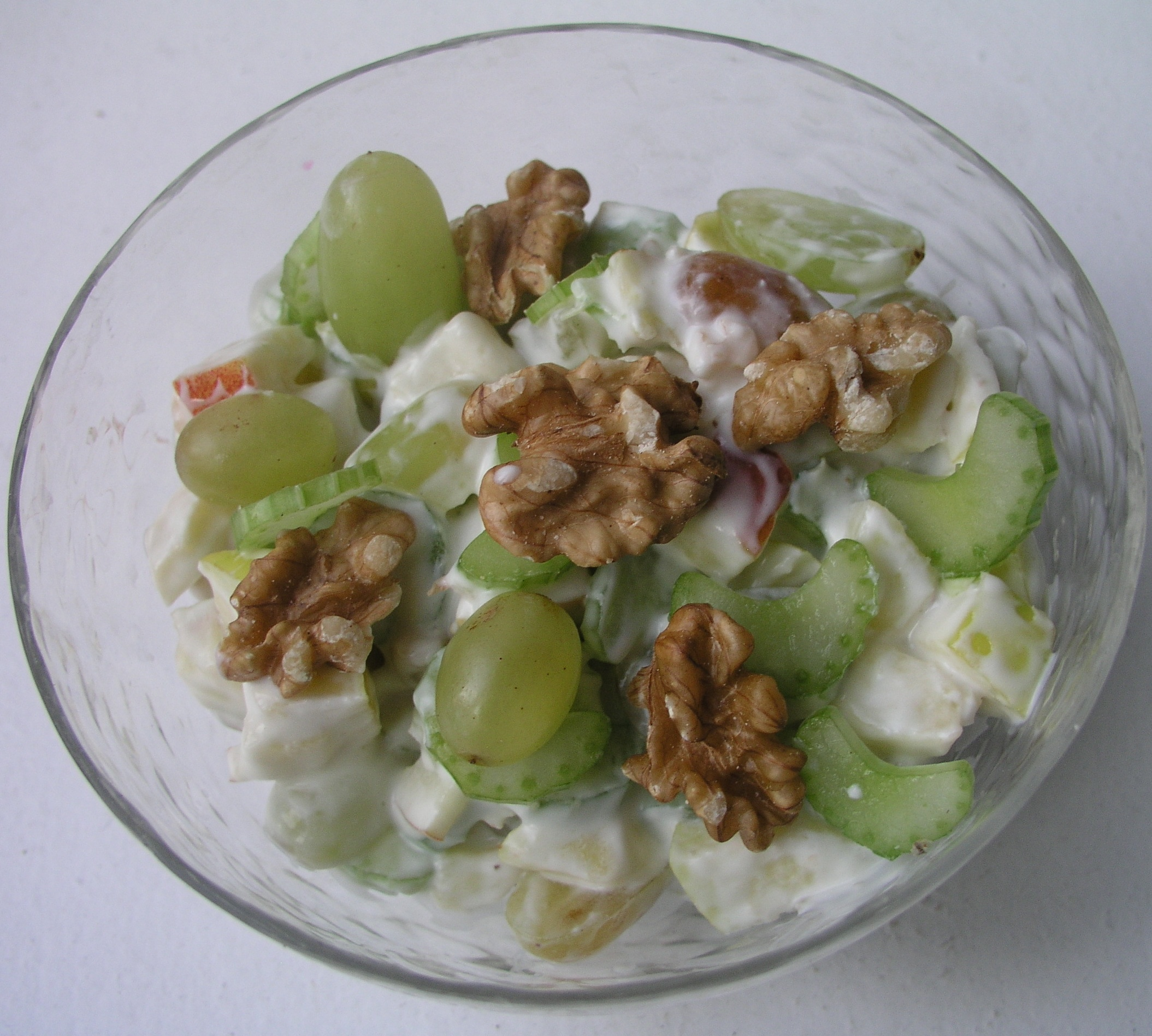
- A modern Waldorf salad with green grapes and whole walnuts, served in a glass bowl (2008)
- Course: Appetizer
- Place of origin: United States
- Region or state: New York
- Created by: Oscar Tschirky
- Serving temperature: Chilled
- Main ingredients: Apples, celery, mayonnaise, walnuts, grapes
- Variations: Poultry, dried fruit (raisins, dates), yogurt dressing, zest of citrus, cauliflower, corn, blue cheese

A Waldorf salad is a fruit and nut salad generally made of celery, fresh apples, walnuts, and grapes, dressed in mayonnaise, and traditionally served on a bed of lettuce as an appetizer or a light meal. The apples, celery, and grapes can all be green, which harmonizes the color palette of the dish.

== History ==
Waldorf salad is named for the Waldorf-Astoria hotel in New York City, where it was first created for a charity ball given in honor of the St. Mary's Hospital for Children on March 13, 1896. The Waldorf-Astoria's maître d'hôtel, Oscar Tschirky, developed or inspired many of the hotel's signature dishes and is widely credited with creating the salad recipe. In 1896, the salad appeared in The Cook Book by "Oscar of the Waldorf".

The original recipe was just apples, celery, and mayonnaise. It did not contain nuts, but they had been added by the time the recipe appeared in The Rector Cook Book in 1928.

== Alternative versions ==
Other ingredients such as chicken, turkey, and dried fruit (such as dates or raisins) are sometimes added. Updated versions of the salad sometimes change the dressing to a seasoned mayonnaise or a yogurt dressing. Modern Waldorf salad may also include the zest of oranges and/or lemons. Variations include a peanut butter and yogurt base, and one that replaces celery with cauliflower.

== In popular culture ==
An American guest demanding a Waldorf salad featured prominently in a 1979 episode of the British sitcom Fawlty Towers. The salad is mentioned in the Cole Porter song "You're the Top".

The salad is alluded to in the 2009 Mad Men episode "Guy Walks Into an Advertising Agency", when Conrad Hilton boasts to Don Draper about the Waldorf-Astoria's kitchen and its namesake salad.

== See also ==
- List of fruit dishes
- List of regional dishes of the United States
- List of salads
