= Claire Nielson =

Scottish actress (1937–2026)

- Born: Claire Elizabeth Isbister; 8 April 1937; Glasgow, Scotland
- Died: 29 April 2026 (aged 89); Stratford-upon-Avon, Warwickshire, England
- Occupation: Actress
- Years active: 1957–2026
- Known for: Fawlty Towers; Scotch and Wry; Rab C. Nesbitt

Claire Elizabeth Nielson (née Isbister; 8 April 1937 – 29 April 2026) was a Scottish actress primarily known for her television roles. On television, she played the wife of the belligerent American guest, Mr. Hamilton, in the "Waldorf Salad" episode of Fawlty Towers.

== Filmography ==
Year	Title	Role	Notes
1961	ITV Television Playhouse	Jenny Colquhoun	Episode: "The Island"
1961	The Kitchen	Waitress	credited as Claire Isbister
1962	Backfire!	Valentina Chenko	credited as Claire Isbister
1962	Compact	Delia Appleby	Episode: "A Night Out"
1962–1964	Ghost Squad	Jean Carter	33 episodes
1963	No Hiding Place	Gwen	Episode: "Alexander's Ragtime Girl"
1964	The Wednesday Play	Alison Grant	Episode: "Mr. Douglas"
1965	The Wild Affair	Perfume Saleslady	
1966	Softly, Softly	Mavis Robinson	Episode: "Extraction"
1966	Love Story	Agnes	Episode: "Two's Company"
1966	This Man Craig	Isabel Ritchie	Episode: "Song of McCall"
1967	Thirty-Minute Theatre	Lydia / Agneta	2 episodes
1967–1968	The Revenue Men	Luke Frazer	36 episodes
1968	Detective	Lena Lawson	Episode: "The Beast Must Die"
1969	Dr. Finlay's Casebook	Sister Bing	Episode: "A Dove in the Nest"
1969	Who-Dun-It	Nurse Jane Kelly	Episode: "The Fall of a Goddess"
1970	The Culture Vultures	Dr. Joan Simpson	Episode: "Double, Double, Toil and Trouble"
1971	Play for Today	Ingi - A Time to Keep	Episode: "Orkney"
1971	Kidnapped	Barbara Grant	
1973	The Brothers	Nancy Lincoln	8 episodes
1974	Crown Court	Terry Greene	Episode: "Further Charges"
1974	Marked Personal	Maggie Snead	2 episodes
1975	Thriller	Hilary	Episode: "The Fear is Spreading"
1975	Sutherland's Law	Morag Cramond	Episode: "A Slight Case of Matrimony"
1976	Play for Today	Ellen Simpson	Episode: "Clay, Smeddum and Greenden"
1978	Just William	Vicar's Wife	Episode: "William at the Garden Party"
1978	Angels	Mrs. Johnson	Episode: "Values"
1978 - 1979	Scotch and Wry	Various	
1979	Play for Today	Diana	Episode: "Degree of Uncertainty"
1979	Fawlty Towers	Mrs. Hamilton	Episode: "Waldorf Salad"
1982–1984	Take the High Road	Sarah Cunningham	3 episodes
1985	Bulman	Noelle	Episode: "I Met a Man Who Wasn't There"
1990	Rab C. Nesbitt	Gift Shop Customer	Episode: "Rat"
1993	Punch Drunk	Mrs. Gordon	6 episodes
1993	I, Lovett	Mrs. Lovett	Episode: "The Snowman"
1994	London's Burning	Coroner	1 episode
1996	Pie in the Sky	Anita Block	Episode: "Chinese Whispers"
1996	The Crow Road	Aunt Antonia	4 episodes
2001	Monarch of the Glen	Edith Rankin	1 episode
2002	The Jury	Eleanor Colchester	3 episodes
2002	A is for Acid	Amy McSwan	TV film
2008	Holby City	Pauline Bewley	Episode: "Stolen"
