= The Golden Lady (song) =

Song

from the album The Golden Lady Original soundtrack album
- A-side: "The Golden Lady"
- B-side: "Sophisticated Like You"
- Released: 1979
- Label: Ariola Records ARO 170
- Composers: (G. Garvarentz, S. Ferguson)
- Producers: Robin Blanchflower, Del Newman, George Garvarentz

"The Golden Lady" is a 1979 single by The Three Degrees. It was a theme song for the film of the same name. It was also a chart hit for the group that year.

== Background ==
"The Golden Lady" was written by G. Garvarentz and S. Ferguson. Produced by Robin Blanchflower, Del Newman and George Garvarentz, it was backed with "Sophisticated Like You" and released on Ariola ARO 170 in 1979. It was also the title track from the film soundtrack album.

== Airplay ==
As recorded in the 2 June issue of Music Week, "The Golden Lady" was at No. 4 on the Top Add Ons chart. It was also a Hit Pick at Radio City and a Hit Pick and Station Hit at Radio Forth. It was a Hit Pick at Radio Hallam in Sheffield, Swansea Sound in Swansea, Radio Orwell in Ipswich and BBC Scotland. It was an Add On at Radio Trent in Nottingham.

== Charts ==
The single spent three weeks in the UK charts, peaking at No. 56.
