= The Portrait of a Lady (TV series) =

1968 British television series

- Genre: Historical drama
- Based on: The Portrait of a Lady by Henry James
- Written by: Jack Pulman
- Directed by: James Cellan Jones
- Starring: Suzanne Neve; Richard Chamberlain; Edward Fox
- Country of origin: United Kingdom
- Original language: English
- No. of series: 1
- No. of episodes: 6

Production
- Producer: David Conroy
- Running time: 45 minutes (Total 270 minutes)
- Production company: BBC

Original release
- Network: BBC One
- Release: 6 January – 10 February 1968

The Portrait of a Lady is a British television series which originally aired on BBC One during 1968. An adaptation of the novel The Portrait of a Lady by Henry James, it starred Suzanne Neve and Richard Chamberlain.

The cast also included Edward Fox, Sarah Brackett, Beatrix Lehmann, Kathleen Byron, Rachel Gurney and James Maxwell.

Originally broadcast in black and white before BBC One could transmit colour television, the series survived the BBC's archival purge in full colour and is available on DVD.

== Cast ==
- Richard Chamberlain as Ralph Touchett
- Suzanne Neve as Isabel Archer
- Sarah Brackett as Henrietta Stackpole
- Beatrix Lehmann as Mrs. Lydia Touchett
- Rachel Gurney as Madame Merle
- James Maxwell as Gilbert Osmond
- Kathleen Byron as Countess Gemini
- Ed Bishop as Caspar Goodwood
- Edward Fox as Lord Warburton
- Sharon Gurney as Pansy
- Angus MacKay as Mr. Bantling
- Alan Gifford as Mr. Daniel Touchett
- Susan Tebbs as Constance
- Felicity Gibson as Mildred
- Cavan Kendall as Ned Rosier
- Rosalind Atkinson as Sister Catherine
- Margaret Corey as Maid
- Kevork Malikyan as Servant
- Marguerite Young as Nun
- Kitty Fitzgerald as Sister Theresa
- Michael Reubens as Messenger
- Richard Young as Receptionist
- Howard Charlton as Porter
- John DeVaut as Servant

== Bibliography ==
- Hischak, Thomas S. American Literature on Stage and Screen: 525 Works and Their Adaptations. McFarland, 2014.
