= The Golden Lady =

1979 British-Hong Kong film by José Ramón Larraz

- movie poster
- Directed by: José Ramón Larraz
- Written by: Joshua Sinclair
- Produced by: Keith Cavele; Paul Cowan; Joshua Sinclair
- Starring: Christina World; June Chadwick; Suzanne Danielle; Anika Pavel; Stephan Chase; Desmond Llewelyn; Patrick Newell
- Cinematography: David Griffiths
- Music by: Georges Garvarentz
- Distributed by: Target
- Release date: 1979
- Running time: 91 minutes
- Countries: United Kingdom; Hong Kong
- Language: English

The Golden Lady is a 1979 thriller film directed by José Ramón Larraz and starring Christina World, June Chadwick, Suzanne Danielle and Desmond Llewelyn. A British-Hong Kong co-production, the film was shot in 1978 and released in 1979.

== Plot ==
Julia Hemingway, a British female mercenary, is hired by wealthy businessman Charlie Whitlock in order to help him eliminate the competition on the purchase of some oil fields in Saudi Arabia. Hemingway coordinates a team of three sexy women to go undercover to complete the task, but is unaware that Whitlock plans on double crossing her so he will not have to pay for her services.

== Reception ==
The Monthly Film Bulletin wrote: "A redundant and largely inept attempt to present James Bond in female form – and in case the point is missed, Desmond Llewelyn (the gadget boffin from the Bond films) flits across the screen at an early moment, to be ringingly hailed with "Haven't I seen him somewhere before?" There the resemblance with Connery and Co abruptly ends, as a witless script drags the smugly non-charismatic principals from one feeble set-piece to the next, to culminate in an interminable duel between a helicopter and a motorcyclist. If any credit is due at all, it should be shared equally by the Cockney hit-man who can recognise a Greek accent over the telephone, and the sound-mixer, who skilfully and obligingly suppresses deafening gunfire, disco music and the like whenever the characters want to explain the impenetrable plot to each other."

Variety wrote: "Hard to see much appeal in this cheapie, which features Danish newcomer Christina World as a distaff James Bond, but which will leave audiences neither shaken nor stirred. Action is underpowered, while sex, ever-expected, is underexploited. Script by Joshua Sinclair gets enmeshed in a pretentious plot..."

== Cast ==
- Ina Skriver as Julia Hemingway (credited as Christina World)
- June Chadwick as Lucy
- Suzanne Danielle as Dahlia
- Anika Pavel as Carol
- Stephan Chase as Max Rowlands
- Desmond Llewelyn as Dixon
- Patrick Newell as Charlie Whitlock
- Ava Cadell as Anita
- Edward de Souza as Yorgo Praxis
- Dave King as Dietmar Schuster
- Richard Oldfield as Wayne Bentley
- Nayef Rashed as Mabrook
- Terry Downes as Trainer
- Hot Gossip as Themselves
- Blonde on Blonde as Themselves

== Soundtrack ==
The music for the film was composed by Georges Garvarentz. The theme song to the film, "The Golden Lady", was performed by The Three Degrees, and was co-written by Garvarentz with lead vocalist Sheila Ferguson. It was released as a single and peaked at #56 on the UK Singles Chart in June 1979.
