= Declaration of Intention =

Declaration of Intention, also called the Declaration of Intent, may refer to:

- A part of the betrothal rite, the blessing and ratifying of an engagement in some denominations of Christianity
- A part of the service of Holy Matrimony in some denominations of Christianity in which the marriage parties affirm their desire to be wed
- A step in the process of Naturalization in the United States
