= David Auker =

British film and television actor (1949–2022)

David Auker (March 1949 – 26 August 2022) was a British film and television actor. He died in August 2022, at the age of 73.

== Filmography ==
=== Film ===
- Unman, Wittering and Zigo (1971) .... Aggeridge
- Confessions of a Pop Performer (1975) .... Zombie (Kipper)
- Adventures of a Taxi Driver (1976) .... 2nd kidnapper
- Emily (1976) .... Billy
- Stand Up, Virgin Soldiers (1977) .... Lantry
- A Bridge Too Far (1977) .... 'Taffy' Brace
- The Spy Who Loved Me (1977) .... LS RP2 Peters (HMS Ranger Crewman)
- Confessions from a Holiday Camp (1977) .... Alberto Smarmi
- Cola, Candy, Chocolate (1979) .... Johnny Smith
- Last Resort (2000) .... 2nd Council Official
- Bridget Jones: The Edge of Reason (2004) .... Clive (final film role)

=== Television ===
- Crossroads (1964) .... Arnold Jenkins
- Hans Brinker (1969) .... Jacob
- The Worker (1970) .... Skinhead
- Shades of Greene (1975) .... Chemist's assistant
- Get Some In! (1976) .... AC1 cook Dunlop
- The Mayor of Casterbridge (1978) .... Policeman
- Danger UXB (1979) .... Sapper Baines
- Minder (1980) .... Chas
- Shoestring (1980) .... Reg Kendall, Auditionee
- Dangerous Davies: The Last Detective (1981) .... Tarquin
- Bergerac (1981) .... Press Man
- Q.E.D. (1982) .... Dutch Taxi Driver
- The Chinese Detective ....(1982) .... Sgt. Western
- Hammer House of Mystery and Suspense (1985) .... Removal man
- Bottle Boys (1984–1985) .... Billy Watson
- The Bill (1987–2002) .... Geoff Kirkwood / Off Licence Manager / Hutchinson / Mr. Batt / Pub Landlord / Mr. Foulkes
- Emmerdale Farm (1994) .... Clive Simmons
- The Politician's Wife (1995) .... Labour Party member
- The Girl (1996) .... Walters
