= Punch Drunk (TV series) =

British television series

Punch Drunk is a British sitcom created and written by Clayton Moore. It was produced by Colin Gilbert of The Comedy Unit, BBC Scotland.

The premiere episode aired on 4 January 1993. The show ran for 1 series of 6 episodes in 1993 on BBC1. The first episode was directed by Colin Gilbert and the remaining five by Ron Bain.

It starred Kenny Ireland as Vinnie Binns, the owner of a boxing gym, who discovers a young prospect in Hance Glover (John Kazek) after spotting him perform in a pub fracas. Both Vinnie and Hance hold a candle for Vikki Brown (Diana Hardcastle), the girlfriend of the head of the Doctors Against Boxing organisation, Norman Banks, played by Jonathan Kydd.

Vinnie's seedy boxing arch-rival is Hunter (Sean Scanlan) whose plooky sidekick is Slug (Gilbert Martin).

Other characters were boxing trainer Neillie (Jake D'Arcy), Hance's mother, Mrs Gordon (Claire Nielson), and Danny, a slow-witted boxer at the end of his career, played by Grant Smeaton.

== Critical response ==
British Comedy Guide called it "An excruciatingly poor sitcom which stretched to only one series, one too many for some! Although Diana Hardcastle attracted a few laughs, the show nonetheless fared poorly." In a positive review, The Independent columnist Tom Sutcliffe said, "Clayton Moore's six-parter had a nicely acidic tone and a genuinely distinctive setting—the seedy world of small-time boxing." Moira Petty of The Stage and Television Today stated that the series' "figurehead, a struggling boxing manager (Kenny Ireland was made likable enough for sitcom consumption and the scene snappily set for confrontation".

In a negative review of the series, The Sunday Times's Tom Lappin wrote, "Too many of its shaky moves seemed based on the misguided belief that what the audience required was vulgarity and a bunch of old Glaswegian tough guy postures. Part of Punch Drunk's failure is the debt it owes to Rab C Nesbitt in its use of vulgar vernacular. Nesbitt is rooted in some degree of reality, with its depiction of a waster's struggle to stay afloat. But Punch Drunk, for all Kenny Ireland's impressive girth, barely fills two dimensions." The Observer found that it is challenging to create a boxing sitcom owing to people's denunciation of the sport. The newspaper concluded, "Yet with a bit of fancy footwork, writer clayton Moore seems to have pulled it off by introducing a smart woman character (played by Diana Hardcastle) who is doing a PhD on the morality of the sport."
