= Counterstrike (1969 TV series) =

1969 British TV sci-fi series

- Genre: Science fiction
- Starring: Jon Finch; Sarah Brackett; Katie Fitzroy; Fraser Kerr
- Theme music composer: Anthony Isaac
- Country of origin: United Kingdom
- Original language: English
- No. of seasons: 1
- No. of episodes: 10 (1 unaired; 6 missing)

Production
- Running time: 50 minutes

Original release
- Network: BBC
- Release: 8 September – 10 November 1969

Counterstrike is a British science fiction television series produced by the BBC in 1969. It starred Jon Finch as an alien living on Earth posing as a journalist named Simon King. As King, he attempts to prevent an alien invasion.

Star Jon Finch called it "a big disappointment... a good cast but poor scripts."

== The series ==
Counterstrike was originally proposed to the BBC in 1966 and a theme tune and effects were produced, but the project was shelved due to the airing of the US import series The Invaders on ITV, which had a similar premise.

It lasted for one series of ten episodes, of which nine episodes were actually transmitted. "Out of Mind", the sixth episode, was cancelled on the night it was due to be shown and was replaced by a documentary on the Kray brothers who, on the same day, had been refused leave to appeal against their prison sentences. "Out of Mind" was, for unknown reasons, never rescheduled; it remained unscreened and was subsequently wiped from the BBC Archives, thus making it one of the rarest pieces of British science-fiction television.

"King's Gambit", "Joker One", "On Ice" and "Nocturne" still exist in the BBC Archives as 16mm black and white film telerecordings, while the remaining five transmitted instalments "Monolith", "The Lemming Syndrome", "Backlash", "All That Glisters" and "The Mutant" – are listed as missing by the Lost Shows website.

== Cast ==
- Jon Finch as Simon King
- Sarah Brackett as Mary
- Katie Fitzroy as Control
- Fraser Kerr as Control

== Episodes ==
Episode descriptions are from the Radio Times

No.	Title	Archival status	Original release date
1	"King’s Gambit"	Exists	8 September 1969
Two apparently respectable businessmen, running an electronics factory, are investigated by a journalist called Simon King. The businessmen turn out to be far from respectable and the journalist, they discover, is not a journalist. Who is Simon King, or rather, what is he?
2	"Joker One"	Exists	15 September 1969
Every war has a flash-point, a fuse, a detonator—something, however small, that triggers it off. In 1914 it was an assassin's bullet at Sarajevo. What could trigger off an atomic war today? The Centaurans think they have the answer. And Simon, of all people, appears to be helping them...
3	"On Ice"	Exists	22 September 1969
Three scientists are mysteriously lost on a sledging party that set out from a polar research station.
4	"Nocturne"	Exists	29 September 1969
The madman lives in a No-Man's-Land a borderline between fantasy and reality... where the real becomes unreal, the unreal real, and life itself a waking nightmare. Simon finds himself living in such a nightmare. Has he gone mad or is he merely suffering from temporary delusions? Above all, why should he want to kill a perfect stranger?
5	"Monolith"	Missing	6 October 1969
Sir Charles Munday is the richest man in the world. Might there be a Centauran plan to murder him?
6	"Out of Mind"	Missing	Unaired
Mary, visiting a village where she stayed as a child, finds that the woman who used to look after her, Hannah Webley, is now regarded as a witch by the superstitious villagers and Mary herself is soon caught up in the ensuing witch hunt.
7	"The Lemming Syndrome"	Missing	20 October 1969
A hundred and forty-three people in one small seaside town commit suicide by drowning. Or were they under some strange and alien influence? Simon decides they probably were ...
8	"Backlash"	Missing	27 October 1969
In a period of student riots, strong calls for a return to 'law and order' are made by General Falcon, a blood-and-guts commander of the Korean war. Suddenly he starts to emerge as an important political figure capable of swaying public and government opinion during an international crisis. Such a man, Simon King decides, is dangerous.
9	"All That Glistens"	Missing	3 November 1969
When adults start acting childishly it is no surprise to Simon. By his standards most people are childish. But when they start acting childishly even by their own standards, when a grown man plays hopscotch and another falls off a rocking horse, then something is wrong. But can there be any connection between childish behaviour and the Centauran plan to take over the earth? It seems unlikely, but Centauran plans frequently do. Until they start to work...
10	"The Mutant"	Missing	10 November 1969
A deadly new germ gets loose at a biological warfare laboratory. Can an antidote be found before the germ spreads into a killer plague?
