= Ina Skriver =

Danish-born actress and model (born 1945)

- Born: Ina Merete Meincke; 16 March 1945 (age 81); Sorø, Denmark
- Occupations: Actress, model

Ina Skriver (born 16 March 1945) is a Danish-born actress and model who worked mostly in British films and television. She is now retired and lives in Somerset.

== Biography ==
Born in Sorø, Denmark, the daughter of Johan Frederik Utke Meincke and Janine Teslack, her original name was Ina Merete Meincke. She has also worked as Christina World.

In 1972, Ina was working as a model through Marianne Models of Copenhagen and had already begun to use the surname of her first husband, Jørgen Skriver.

In 1976 she first appeared in television drama in an episode of The New Avengers, going on to appear in several films, and played the lead in The Golden Lady (1979), working for the first time as Christina World.

On 19 October 1983 she married as his second wife Thomas Ælla Godfrey Gage, a scion of the Anglo-Irish Gage family of County Kerry, gaining two step-sons and two step-daughters. They settled at Withypool, Somerset.

In an unusual libel case in 1984, Skriver sued the Daily Express for claiming that she had been to Balmoral with the Prince of Wales and Prince Andrew.

== Films ==
- The New Avengers, House of Cards (1976): Olga
- Emily (1976) : Augustine Wain
- Voyage of the Damned (1976) : Singer
- Space: 1999, "The AB Chrysalis" (1976) : "A"
- The Golden Lady (1979) : Julia Hemingway (as Christina World)
- Victor/Victoria (1982) : Simone Kallisto
- The Professionals, Servant of Two Masters(1978): Jutta (as Christina World)
