= Yanks Go Home =

British ITV sitcom (1976–77)

- Genre: Comedy
- Written by: H. V. Kershaw; John Stevenson; Anthony Couch
- Directed by: Eric Prytherch; Roger Cheveley
- Starring: Meg Johnson; Bruce Boa; Stuart Damon; Catherine Neilson; Peter Sallis; David Ross; Harry Markham; Freddie Earlle; Alan MacNaughton; Lionel Murton; Richard Oldfield; Norman Bird; Jay Benedict
- Composer: Derek Hilton
- Country of origin: United Kingdom
- Original language: English
- No. of series: 2
- No. of episodes: 13

Production
- Producer: Eric Prytherch
- Running time: 30 minutes
- Production company: Granada Television

Original release
- Network: ITV
- Release: 22 November 1976 – 19 September 1977

Yanks Go Home is a British sitcom about U.S. Army Air Forcemen stationed in Lancashire, England, during the Second World War. It was produced and directed by Eric Prytherch for Granada Television and broadcast on ITV between 1976 and 1977. The series ran for 2 series and 13 episodes in total before its cancellation.

== Plot ==
The series focused on a group of U.S. Army Air Force pilots stationed in a small northern town in Lancashire, England during the Second World War and their sometimes tense relationship with the local men, most often over the attentions of the young women in the town. The early interactions and friction between British civilians and the U.S. military during WWII, best summed up by the wartime slogan referring to American servicemen: "over paid, over sexed, and over here", were intentionally played up in the series for humorous effect.

== Characters ==
- Phoebe Sankey (Meg Johnson)
- Sgt. Gus Polaski (Bruce Boa)
- Cpl. Vince Rossi (Stuart Damon)
- Doreen Sankey (Catherine Neilson)
- Harry Duckworth (David Ross)
- Bert Pickup (Harry Markham)
- Cpl. Pasquale (Freddie Earlle)
- Col. Ralph Kruger (Alan MacNaughtan)
- Col. Irving (Lionel Murton)
- Pfc. Burford Puckett (Richard Oldfield)
- Leonard Chambers (Norman Bird)
- Pvt. Floyd Tutt (Jay Benedict)
- Randall Todd (Peter Sallis)

== Episodes ==
=== Series 1 (1976–77) ===
No. overall	No. in series	Title	Written by	Original release date
1	1	"Somewhere in England"	Michael Carter	22 November 1976
2	2	"Off Limits"	John Stevenson	29 November 1976
3	3	"Dear John"	H. V. Kershaw	6 December 1976
4	4	"Open Day"	H. V. Kershaw	13 December 1976
5	5	"Brooklyn's Uncle"	John Stevenson	20 December 1976
6	6	"Rossi Keeps His Cool"	Julian Roach	27 December 1976
7	7	"The Liaison Committee"	H. V. Kershaw	3 January 1977

=== Series 2 (1977) ===
No. overall	No. in series	Title	Written by	Original release date
8	1	"Cooke-Cooke"	Anthony Couch	8 August 1977
9	2	"The Game of the Name"	H. V. Kershaw	15 August 1977
10	3	"Bed of Roses"	Anthony Couch	22 August 1977
11	4	"Alarm and Despondency"	John Stevenson	5 September 1977
12	5	"Some of Our Coal Is Missing"	Stuart Damon	12 September 1977
13	6	"The First of the G.I. Brides"	H. V. Kershaw	19 September 1977

== Reception ==
Upon the premiere of the first episode, originally aired on 22 November 1976, the show's title "Yanks Go Home" raised some mild controversy, as the United States had celebrated its bicentennial months before. The show received considerable publicity from the network and appeared on the cover of TV Times.

The show failed to meet the network's expectations however, mostly due to the concept already having been touched upon in Dad's Army (such as in the episode My British Buddy, 3 years and 15 days broadcast before the first episode) but also because of the lack of a regular writing staff. Nearly each episode was written by a different writer, which created noticeable inconsistencies as the series progressed. The studio-based setting and canned laughter also lessened the feel in comparison with Dad's Army. The show was cancelled a year later, the final episode airing on 19 September 1977, and was never brought back for a third.

One of the breakout stars of the show was Freddie Earlle (who also appeared in another ITV Second World War sitcom, Backs to the Land and also in Dad's Army, It Ain't Half Hot Mum and Hi-de-Hi!) whose character Corporal Pasquale was favourably compared to Sgt. Bilko. The series also featured Stuart Damon of The Champions, who also wrote one episode.

== DVD releases ==
The Complete Series was released on 5 March 2012 by Network DVD.
