= Scream for Help =

1984 film by Michael Winner

- Original poster
- Directed by: Michael Winner
- Written by: Tom Holland
- Produced by: Michael Winner
- Starring: Rachael Kelly; David Brooks; Marie Masters
- Cinematography: Robert Paynter
- Edited by: Arnold Ross; Michael Winner
- Music by: John Paul Jones
- Production companies: Miracle; Torremodo Ltd. Videoform
- Distributed by: Lorimar
- Release dates: 1 July 1984 (U.S.); 15 March 1985 (London)
- Running time: 89 minutes
- Country: United States
- Language: English
- Budget: $3-6 million

Scream for Help is a 1984 American horror film directed by Michael Winner, written by Tom Holland, and starring Rachael Kelly, David Brooks, and Marie Masters. FIlmed and set in New Rochelle, New York, the film follows Christie Cromwell, a teenage girl who discovers that her stepfather Paul Fox is trying to murder her and her mother Karen, but her repeated claims of her findings are disbelieved by those around her. Former Led Zeppelin member John Paul Jones composed the musical score.

== Plot ==
In New Rochelle, New York, Christie Cromwell, a teenage girl, discovers that her stepfather Paul Fox is trying to murder her and her mother Karen for her money, but when she tries to tell other people about it, no one will believe her. After a maintenance worker dies in the basement, Christie believes Paul set the trap for her mother after she saw him leave the basement the previous night.

Christie begins following Paul everywhere and discovers he is having an affair with a young attractive woman named Brenda Bohle. She is caught by Brenda's brother Lacey but manages to run away. Paul convinces Karen that Brenda is a client of his and she believes him over her daughter.

Christie convinces Josh Dealey, her best friend Janey Ralston's boyfriend, to accompany her to catch Paul, but the brakes to her mother's car have been tampered with, almost killing them. Christie and Janey discover Paul and Brenda at a motel and run when Paul sees them, and soon after Janey is killed in a hit and run by an unseen driver. Christie tells the police that Paul killed Janey, intending to kill her, but she is not believed. Josh sticks up for Christie after she is bullied and blamed for Janey's death.

Later, Christie loses her virginity to Josh but they are interrupted by Paul, who orders Josh to leave. When Christie goes to the bathroom, she notices gas, and she realizes that Paul is trying to kill her too. Karen also falls down the stairs after a trap Paul set for her, putting her in a wheelchair. Christie takes a picture of Paul and Brenda having sex but drops the picture and is seen; while retrieving the picture she overhears that Brenda and Lacey are in fact a married couple who plan to blackmail Paul after he kills Karen and Christie. She shows her mother the picture and Paul is ordered to leave.

At midnight, Paul, Brenda, and Lacey invade the house and force Christie and Karen to the basement, revealing their plans to kill them both at 2 a.m. and blame it on a burglar. Christie tells Paul about the real relationship between Brenda and Lacey, which angers him. Christie tricks Brenda into letting her out to go to the bathroom while Karen cuts the electricity to the house from the basement, giving Christie a chance to run and stab both Lacey and Paul. After Brenda attacks Karen and turns the lights back on, Christie surrenders herself to Lacey, and both victims are forced back to the basement, where they devise another escape plan by wetting the fuse box.

At 2 a.m., they are ordered upstairs but are interrupted by Josh knocking at the door. Lacey orders Christie to open the door and get rid of him. Josh is suspicious and informs the police. When the electricity goes off, both mother and daughter flee their attackers. Lacey orders Brenda to go to the basement and turn the lights back on, but the wet fuse box electrocutes Brenda. After almost catching Karen, Lacey runs to the basement after hearing Brenda's scream and finds her dead. Christie tricks Paul into believing she is in her bathroom; when Paul enters the gas-filled bathroom with a lighter, it explodes and he is killed. Josh saves Christie from the burning house.

With their ordeal over, Christie and Karen reside at another house temporarily when Josh comes over to kiss Christie; Lacey appears, knocks Josh out and plans to kill Christie for what she did to Brenda. Christie pulls out a knife and stabs Lacey through the stomach, killing him.

== Cast ==
- Rachael Kelly as Christie Cromwell
- Marie Masters as Karen Cromwell
- David Allen Brooks as Paul Fox
- Lolita Lorre as Brenda Bohle
- Rocco Sisto as Lacey Bohle
- Corey Parker as Josh Dealey
- Sandra Clark as Janey Ralston
- Tony Sibbald as Bob Dealey
- Stacey Hughes as Seudi
- Matthew Peters as Charlie
- Clare Burt as Patty Sea
- Diana Ricardo as Mrs. Ralston
- Burnell Tucker as Mr. Ralston

Additional appearances include Richard Oldfield and Jeff Harding as unnamed police officers.

== Production ==
Tom Holland wrote Scream for Help shortly after completing Psycho II with Holland saying he wanted to do a horror film with a psychological bent that was based in reality. Holland also stated that the film was meant as something of a reaction to the over-saturation of the slasher genre as he felt it had become too reliant on special effects, violence, and gore and wanted to emphasize the psychological aspects of horror rather than the exploitative. Michael Winner loved the script and called Lorimar telling them he wanted to do the film.

The exterior sequences were filmed on location in New Rochelle, New York over the course of two weeks, while interior sequences were shot in Finchampstead in Berkshire, England. The two weeks in New Rochelle were to accommodate an elaborate action sequence which was one of the few additions Winner made to Holland's script saying of the process "I have never done less work on a script in my life".

== Release ==
=== Critical response ===
Derek Malcolm of The Guardian wrote that director Winner "pushes his plot to further and further levels of implausiblity, and ends with a bloodbath that looks ominously like a practise run for the forthcoming Death Wish III."

Writer Holland, disappointed in Winner's direction, chose to direct his next screenplay himself: Fright Night (1985).

=== Home media ===
Scream for Help was released on VHS, Betamax, and LaserDisc in North America by Karl-Lorimar Home Video on 15 October 1985. The film's home video release received a significant promotional campaign in retail markets, including special brochures, posters, counter cards, and a cardboard standup. Stuart Karl, then-president of Karl-Lorimar, commented at the time: "To our knowledge, this is the first time in home video history that a company has approached advertising for a home video feature as if it were a theatrical release."

The film has not been issued on DVD but a Blu-ray from Scream Factory was released on 18 September 2018.
