= Centaurs in popular culture =

Centaurs appear often in popular culture. Some appearances are also listed under Centaurides.

== Print ==
Centaurs have appeared in many places in modern fiction, and may be regarded as a fantasy trope. In modern literature differing views of centaurs vary with the author.

=== Novels ===
- In Piers Anthony's series Xanth, centaurs are frequently major/main characters of the various stories. As a race, they generally don't show magic talents as other species do, treating it as something for lesser species, although they have been shown to have talents as well.
- In John Varley's Gaea trilogy, the musically inclined Titanides are simultaneous hermaphrodites who possess three sets of genitalia: one set of human-sized genitalia in the front (male or female), and both sets of equine genitalia in the back (male and female). "Rear sex" is casual, but "front sex" carries an enormous amount of emotional baggage. Furthermore, both genders have breasts.
- Centaurs appear in the Well World books as one of the races found both on the Well World, and as such, throughout the universe. They are generally kind and hospitable people, living simple lives without advanced technology or magic, though this is mostly due to the rules of the Well World and likely may not apply to those in the rest of the universe.
- In C. S. Lewis's The Chronicles of Narnia, centaurs are noble, loyal, and brave. Oreius (Aslan's general) and his tribe of centaurs help Aslan's army fight against the White Witch, in the 2005 film version of The Lion, the Witch, and the Wardrobe, but they gain a more prominent role in Prince Caspian where a centaur named Glenstorm (who also studies the stars and reads the future) is an important character.
- In R.A. Salvatore's The DemonWars Saga series, there is a Centaur featured named "Bradwarden" that plays the bagpipes and is one of the supporting characters throughout most of the series.
- Eoin Colfer's Artemis Fowl series features Foaly, one of the heroes, and the most intelligent centaur on and under the Earth.
- In J. K. Rowling's Harry Potter series, centaurs are near-humans that live in the Forbidden Forest. The centaurs tend to be passive creatures, but become violent if people intrude on their territory too often. They study the stars and planets, and can also sometimes see the future - although they may speak in indirect and ambiguous terms about it.
- In the novel The Neverending Story by Michael Ende appears a centaur, which name Cairon and profession as physician directs to Chiron, an ancient Greek mythological centaur and great doctor. He is shown to have black skin for his human half and his horse half is a zebra.
- In Monsterology: The Complete Book of Monstrous Creatures, centaurs are shown as being party animals, which raises the question of how they stayed concealed for so long, who live in Southern Greece, and have the Latin name Centaurus Indomitus. A picture shows one with two chests.
- In Edgar Rice Burroughs' novel The Moon Maid, the moon is inhabited by centaur like beings evil Communist-based "Kalkars".
- In Rick Riordan's Percy Jackson & the Olympians series, centaurs are friendly and help Camp Half Blood against the attacks of Kronos and Luke. However they are very wild, and seem to enjoy getting drunk.
  - Rick Riordan's The Heroes of Olympus also features the Cyprian Centaurs who are among the creatures on Gaea's side.
- In Star Wars, there are two centauroid races, the very centaur-like species called Chironians, most likely a play on the name of the legendary centaur, Chiron, and the striped hermaphrodite Berrites, which are very clumsy, but sneaky.
- The American poet May Swenson wrote a poem called "The Centaur", which appeared in her book A Cage of Spines in 1958, and which portrays a girl riding a make-believe horse (actually a willow branch) who comes to feel that she is the horse.
- Another book series called Animorphs includes a centauroid race of aliens called Andalites.
- P. C. Cast's Partholon series includes numerous centaur characters, including the protagonist Brighid of Brighid's Quest.
- Robert Siegel's 1980 novel Alpha Centauri tells the story of Becky, a modern-day teenage girl and her horse, Becca, who are transported to ancient England and meet Cavallos and his entire centaur clan who, along with fauns and other woodland creatures, are fleeing the hostility of the ever-expanding Rock Movers while seeking safe passage to the homes of the High Ones to return via a mystical bridge back to their home world orbiting the star, Alpha Centauri.

=== Graphic novels and comics ===
- The Belgian comic series Les Centaures (The Centaurs) by Pierre Seron features two young, blue-skinned centaurs expelled from Olympus named Aurore and Ulysses as protagonists.
- In the manga series Bleach (and the anime based on it), when the character Nelliel Tu Odelschwanck enters her released form, she becomes a powerful ibex-type centaur.
- The manga series A Centaur's Life's main character is a centaur in a fantastically set but otherwise everyday world.
- The manga series Yu-Gi-Oh! (and the anime and card game based on it) features numerous centaurs summonable from cards like Mystic Horseman, Gladiator Beast Equeste, Chiron the Mage, Exarion Universe, the Minoan Centaur (whose Japanese name of Minocensatyrus has the creature also evoking the traits of the Minotaur and the Satyr), Centaur Mina (who is a fusion of 1 Warrior Monster of the Light element and 1 Beast monster), Sky Calvary Centaurea. There is also a spell card called Twin Bow Centaur.
- In the Micronauts comics, based on toys, both Baron Karza and Prince Argon can transform into centaurs.
- The manga series Monster Musume by Okayado features a female Centaur character named Centorea Shianus who is one of the seven "Extra Species" characters living with protagonist Kimihito Kuruso.
- In the manga series One Piece (and the anime based on it), Franky has a "backward" Centaur form. Most of the Brownbeard Pirates have centaur-like forms of different animals after their original damaged legs were replaced by Tralfagar D. Law. A minor character named Speed gained the appearance of a centauride after she consumed an artificial Devil Fruit called the Horse SMILE.

== Films and television ==
=== Film ===
- The Centaurs, a 1921 animated film by Winsor McCay, features what appears to be a family of centaurs. Only fragments of the film have survived.
- Centaurs, among many other mythological creatures, played a key role in one in the 1940 Disney animated film Fantasia in the segment Symphony No. 6 by Ludwig van Beethoven. Among them were the typical white, bay, and chestnut centaurs, along with various unnatural colors, and also a pair of Nubian centaurs which were dark-skinned and their horse parts are of a zebra.
- In the Italian sword and sandal film La vendetta di Ercole, actor Claudio Undari performs the character Polimorfeo, a creature which can change between the forms of a centaur and faun at will.
- A one-eyed Centaur appears on the mythical island Lemuria in The Golden Voyage of Sinbad. It represents evil, and is very savage. Sinbad finally kills it at the Fountain of Destiny.
- In the Disney animated film Hercules, a centaur Nessus was defeated by Hercules.
- Buzz Lightyear of Star Command: The Adventure Begins has a Star Command Crew member who is a centaurette/cyclops hybrid.
- In Monkeybone, one of the inhabitants of Down Town is a cowboy-dressed centaur (portrayed by Jody St. Michael). In an original scene, the centaur offered a "pony ride" to Stu Miley upon his arrival only for Stu to quote "No, not right now".
- Centaurs have appeared in the Harry Potter film series, in The Chronicles of Narnia: The Lion, the Witch and the Wardrobe as well as in The Chronicles of Narnia: Prince Caspian and also in the Percy Jackson & the Olympians: The Lightning Thief.
- In the movie Step Brothers, John C. Reilly's character Dale appears as a centaur in a dream sequence.
- In the 2007 animated film TMNT, an optic centaur appears with seven fingers on both hands.
- Centaurs are one of several races that coexist with humans in the 2017 urban fantasy film Bright. The movie depicts two centaur LAPD officers on precinct guard duty, and a third responding to an altercation involving an orc.
- The country music trolls are introduced in Trolls World Tour in the form of centaurs.
- Disney and Pixar's Onward has centaurs who have horse ears to match their horse bodies and serve as the police.
- In America: The Motion Picture, Paul Revere merged with his horse Clyde after the latter's death which turns him into a cyborg-like centaur.

=== Television ===
- A Centaur girl appears in Wizards of Waverly Place episode "Beware Wolf" portrayed by Renna Nightingale. She is mentioned at the beginning where it's mentioned she was Justin Russo's date from WizFace. During the credits, she visits Justin again wanting a second chance at dating him only to walk away quoting "Goodbye".
- In the Phineas and Ferb episode "Isabella and The Temple of Sap", Isabella's daydreams has Phineas depicted as a centaur.
- In the animated series The Mighty Hercules, the title character's sidekick is a centaur named Newton.
- In the animated series Foster's Home for Imaginary Friends, in the pilot episode, House of Bloo's, there is a green Imaginary friend who resembles a centaur. they also appear in The Big Cheese
- The centaurs appear in Hercules: Legendary Journeys.
  - In the spinoff Xena: Warrior Princess, the centaurs are portrayed as a noble race and allies of Xena's late husband Boreas. Also, they have forged an uneasy alliance with the Amazons.
  - The prequel Young Hercules revealed that Hercules and Iolaus were trained by Chiron.
- In Futurama: Bender's Game, Leela appears as a centaur.
- In an Old Spice Commercial, Scott Bailey appears in two as a centaur: one for Double Impact and one for Live Wire.
- In the Parks and Recreation episode "Jerry's Painting," Jerry Gergich paints the centaur goddess Diaphena. His depiction coincidentally resembles Leslie Knope, much to Leslie's pleasure.
- On the TV show Impractical Jokers, one of guys, Murr is forced to dress up as a centaur as punishment for losing.
- On the TV show The Simpsons, centaurs have appeared twice in the Treehouse of Horror series. In the 13th episode, Lisa is transformed into a centaur and in the 14th Ned Flanders is changed into a cowtaur by Dr. Hibbert.
- In Star Twinkle PreCure, Fuwa's Sagittarius transformation by the Purple Star Pen is centaur-based.
- On the TV show The Magicians, centaurs are doctors in several episodes on Fillory.
- The 1984 My Little Pony animated special and Friendship Is Magic series feature a villainous horned centaur named Tirac (in the special) and Tirek (in Friendship is Magic)
- The TV show Centaurworld features an entire world inhabited by centaurs, who have various animal halves besides horses.
- In Krapopolis, Shlub is a hybrid between a centaur and a manticore known as a Mantitaur.
- In Shinkalion Z, one of the Dark Shinkalion's modes is based on a centaur.

== Games ==
- Centaurs based on the mythical creatures appear throughout the editions of the Dungeons & Dragons role-playing game as a monster or a playable race, with variants in different campaign settings.
- Centaurs are common characters in the Shining series of games by SEGA.
- Dora is a female centaur in Golden Axe: The Revenge of Death Adder.
- Centaur Angels (Acceptance, Accolade, Allegiance) are main angelic enemies in the Bayonetta 2 of games by SEGA and PlatinumGames.
- In the series Digimon, Beast Man Digimon Centaurumon and Armor Digimon Sagittarimon are based on centaurs.
- Centaurs, alongside their leader Chiron are one of the many mythical creatures in Age of Mythology. They are sacred to the Greek Classical Age god Hermes.
- Tomb Raider and Tomb Raider: Anniversary both feature centaurs and centaur mutants as foe.
- The Mortal Kombat character Motaro is the leader of his centaur race.
- In Warcraft 3: Reign of Chaos centaurs are depicted as the savage and bastard children of the demigod Cenarius. This was later retconned in World of Warcraft.
- In Guild Wars, Centaurs are a common enemy for a player to face. In the Nightfall Campaign, players may recruit a Centaur Hero named Zhed Shadowhoof.
- In Fire Emblem: The Sacred Stones, centaur-like creatures appear in many maps under the names Tarvos and Maelduin.
- Centaur Man is a Robot Master in Mega Man 6. He appears as a light-green robotic Centaur with the ability to freeze his enemies and teleport.
- Centaurs frequently appear in the video game series Heroes of Might and Magic as soldiers of the forests.
- Centaurs are enemies found in the Act I (Greece) of the 2006 game Titan Quest.
- In the 2008 game Fallout 3, centaurs are radiated human enemies who have sprouted six arms and a tongue that attacks the player with great force.
- In EVE Online, there are several ships which bear the names of a multitude of figures, some of which include: Erebus, the Gallente Titan class ship and Charon, the Caldari Freighter class ship. The references to Greek mythology occur primarily within the Gallente race, with a few exceptions.
- The God of War series offers centaurs as enemy units. They are vicious, quick, but can easily be overtaken in a few moves. They are depicted as almost zombie-like and wear large, steel helmets. In the third game, they can increase enemy stats, such as speed and defense.
- Lex battles three centaurs (Including Nessus, the boss) in Bookworm Adventures.
- The champion Hecarim from League of Legends is based on an undead Centaur Knight.
- The hero Bradwarden (possible reference to R. A. Salvator's centaur of the same name) from the Dota series.
- In the first MediEvil game, as well as in the remaster, Ravenhooves is shown to be a centaur. Additionally, but only within the PSP remake, Lord Kardok is portrayed as an undead centaur as well.
- In The Legend of Zelda, there is a centauroid enemy named Lynel.
- The Dark Elemental Trap Master in Skylanders: Trap Team is a female centaur named Knight Mare.
- In Mobile Legends: Bang Bang, Hylos are based on Centaur.
- In Heroes of Might and Magic III, centaurs are recruitable troops from the town, Rampart.
- In Elden Ring Nightreign, Fulghor, Champion of Nightglow, is a one-armed centaur boss fought at the end of the Darkdrift Knight expedition. His faith in the old gods allow him to wield a sacred form of the Night's power.

== Music and audio ==
- The 1975 solo album Ride a Rock Horse by Roger Daltrey of The Who portrays him as a centaur on the album cover. The cover photography is by Graham Hughes.
- The 2024 album The Singer of Staten Island by John Lipari portrays him as a centaur on the album cover. The cover photography is by Lipari.

== Art ==
- In Erich Kissing's contemporary paintings he depicts himself and others in hedonistic centaur form.
