= Janet Lees Price =

Welsh actress (1943–2012)

Janet Lees Price (19 April 1943 – 22 May 2012) was a British actress who appeared in television programmes including: Emergency – Ward 10, Z-Cars, The First Lady, Softly, Softly, Dixon of Dock Green, Upstairs, Downstairs, Within These Walls, Blake's 7, By the Sword Divided, The Bill and Agatha Christie's Poirot.

She was married to actor Paul Darrow, best known for his role as Kerr Avon in the BBC's science-fiction television series Blake's 7. She died on 22 May 2012, aged 69, after a long illness.
