= MediEvil (2019 video game) =

2019 video game

- Developer: Other Ocean Emeryville
- Publisher: Sony Interactive Entertainment
- Producer: Jeff Nachbauer
- Composers: Andrew Barnabas; Paul Arnold
- Series: MediEvil
- Engine: Unreal Engine 4
- Platform: PlayStation 4
- Release: October 25, 2019
- Genres: Action-adventure, hack and slash
- Mode: Single-player

MediEvil is a 2019 action-adventure game developed by Other Ocean Emeryville and published by Sony Interactive Entertainment for the PlayStation 4. The player controls the protagonist, Sir Daniel Fortesque, through a series of levels, utilizing various weapons to attack enemies as well as encountering several non-playable characters. It is a remake of MediEvil, which was originally developed by British video game developer SCE Cambridge Studio and released for the PlayStation in 1998.

The MediEvil remake was first announced as a remaster of MediEvil in late 2017 and later as a remake the following year. The developers of MediEvil took advantage of the advances in technology since the first MediEvil to enhance aspects, while trying to avoid straying too far from the presentation of the original. Additional features not present in the original were included in the remake. The MediEvil remake was released on October 25, 2019. Various bonus content was included in special editions.

MediEvil received mixed reviews from critics, who praised its presentation, but criticized some aspects of its gameplay. The game is dedicated to Zarok's voice actor, Paul Darrow, who died on June 3, 2019.

== Gameplay ==
Sir Daniel Fortesque encountering a Rhinotaur in the "Crystal Caves" level. The optional "Dan Cam" camera viewpoint is being used.

MediEvil takes place across a series of levels selectable from a map of Gallowmere. The character, Sir Daniel Fortesque, is able to utilize a variety of weapons ranging from close range weapons such as swords and clubs to long range weapons such as throwing daggers and bows, many of which can be charged for a more powerful attack. When not in possession of any weapons, Sir Daniel is able to use his arm for melee and ranged attacks. Sir Daniel is also able to equip a shield alongside his weapons for defense, though they can only resist a limited amount of damage and do not protect Dan from certain types of damage, such as long falls. As Sir Daniel is hit by enemies, he will lose part of his health bar. If his entire health bar is depleted, the game will end. While Sir Daniel does not recover health automatically between levels, he can utilize Life Bottles to refill all of his health should it be completely depleted.

Sir Dan is able to encounter two varieties of gargoyle heads throughout the game: green gargoyles offer Sir Dan information, while blue gargoyles offer him ammunition for his weapons in exchange for gold. In each level, Sir Dan is able to find a chalice of Souls, which can be collected if the player has defeated enough enemies. Dan can use the chalices to gain access to the Hall of Heroes, where he can talk to one of several non-playable characters to receive a new weapon or other item. If Sir Dan collects all chalices, the true ending will be shown.

While the game remains largely identical in content to the original MediEvil, several new features have been introduced. This includes the ability to toggle between a primary and secondary weapon, first introduced as a feature in MediEvil 2, the "Dan Cam", an optional camera viewpoint which uses an over-the-shoulder perspective, and a compendium of information about the characters and enemies, known as the Book of Gallowmere. Optional "Lost Souls" objectives have also been incorporated into the game, which require Sir Dan to complete a mission received from a ghost found in each level. If all Lost Souls objectives are completed, the player unlocks the option to play the original MediEvil on the menu screen, under the name of "Old Game".

== Development ==
According to the executive producer of the MediEvil remake, Jeff Nachbauer, Other Ocean Emeryville wished to keep most elements from the original MediEvil intact, unless they felt there was a good reason to change something. This included the retention of several glitches present in the original MediEvil, which were considered by the developers to be crucial to the feel of the game. One of these glitches was for sword swings that made the motion irregular and unpredictable. The developers researched music the original developers would have listened to at the time of the development of the first MediEvil. Level geometry was extracted from the original MediEvil and imported into the remake's engine to serve as a reference for the placement of level elements. Due to the game's further draw distance and wider aspect ratio, new background areas that did not exist in the original MediEvil needed to be created, and additional trees and foliage were added to certain areas. Enemy behaviors left in the source code of the original MediEvil, but removed from the finished game due to time constraints, were restored for the MediEvil remake.

=== Character design ===
Art director Nick Bruty believed that it was crucial to keep the feel of the first MediEvil in Sir Daniel Fortesque's design, while still adding extra detail and shape to the low-resolution 3D model from the original game. Sir Dan's arms were made longer, as they were considered to look strange in the higher resolution of the MediEvil remake. Sir Dan's armor was redesigned to be more grounded while still accommodating for his animations. They had initially given Dan's armor a cleaner design, but made his armor more tattered later in development. The design of Sir Dan's skull went through several iterations, with the finalized design intending to strike a balance between the more gritty design of the original MediEvil and the more humorous design of MediEvil: Resurrection. Due to advances in technology since the development of the first MediEvil, Other Ocean was able to create a wider range of expressions for Sir Dan compared to the original game.

=== Voice acting ===
Most in-game dialogue was recycled from the original MediEvil (the only exception to this is Zarok's command of "Fire!" in the cinematic showing what had really happened to Dan). Jason Wilson, the voice actor of Sir Dan in MediEvil and MediEvil: Resurrection, reprised his role. Unlike the original MediEvil, where Sir Dan's muffled voice effect was created by recording his lines while wearing a bucket, the effect was instead post-processed for the MediEvil remake. Tom Baker was replaced as the voice of the narrator by Lani Minella.

=== Music ===
Andrew Barnabas and Paul Arnold, who had composed the soundtrack for the previous three games in the series, returned to compose for the MediEvil remake. The music of the MediEvil remake was orchestrated by Prague Symphony Orchestra. The soundtrack consists of remastered versions of music that appeared in MediEvil: Resurrection, orchestral arrangements of tracks from the original MediEvil, and new tracks composed exclusively for the MediEvil remake.

=== Emulator ===
A software PlayStation emulator was developed so that the original game could be unlocked and played on the PlayStation 4, which at the time lacked any backwards compatibility with PlayStation 1 games. The inclusion of the software led to attention from the modding community after launch, and resulted in attempts to run other games through MediEvil's PlayStation emulator. Formal support for emulating other original PlayStation games on PS4 did not emerge until the 2022 revamp of PlayStation Plus.

== Release ==
The MediEvil remake was first announced as a remaster of MediEvil at the 2017 PlayStation Experience. MediEvil was fully revealed on October 31, 2018, and was confirmed to be a full remake, instead of a remaster as was previously announced. In the May 9, 2019, PlayStation State of Play, the digital only "Digital Deluxe Edition" version was revealed, which includes the Super Armor from MediEvil 2 (that now increases the gold Sir Dan earns), a theme based on the game for the PlayStation 4 user interface, a digital art book, a digital graphic novel prequel known as MediEvil: Fate's Arrow, and a digital music player featuring the soundtrack, the latter receiving a future update allowing the user to download the music. In the September 24, 2019, PlayStation State of Play, a demo of MediEvil, known as MediEvil: Short-Lived Demo, was announced to be available from the end of the presentation until October 6, 2019. The demo features an unlockable helmet item that can carry over to the full game. The helmet is based on the Japanese version of the original MediEvil, which features Sir Dan wearing a helmet by default, and also increases the difficulty level. A version of the Short-Lived Demo with additional levels was released on December 20, 2019.

== Reception ==
Reception

Aggregate scores
Aggregator	Score
GameRankings	67%
Metacritic	67/100

Review scores
Publication	Score
Destructoid	7.5/10
Game Informer	6.5/10
GameSpot	5/10
GamesRadar+	3/5
IGN	6.5/10
VideoGamer.com	7/10

MediEvil received mixed reviews from critics. It received an aggregate score of 67% from GameRankings and a score of 67 from review aggregator Metacritic based on 72 critics, indicating mixed or average reviews.

Praise was directed at the visual design, which was considered to be faithful to the original MediEvil, and the character, setting, and story. Aspects of MediEvil's gameplay design were often considered by critics to feel outdated, in particular the lack of a checkpoint mechanic. Some mechanics like the instant death upon falling into water were also subject to criticism, and were considered to be aggravated by the unreliable controls and cameras. Combat was criticized for being frustrating and imprecise.

IGN's Travis Northup considered MediEvil's "relentlessly charming story" as its greatest strength, and praised the added details and personality to the visuals and audio, but described the combat as "sloppy and disorienting". GameSpot's James Swinbanks, while also praising characters and visual style, shared similar concerns about the combat as well as other basic tasks which are made difficult by the sloppy controls and camera movements. Destructoid's Chris Carter felt that people who did not like the original MediEvil would not like the remake either, and thought the combat mechanics "might be a little too retro for modern audiences", comparing them to older hack-and-slash games such as Golden Axe. Game Informer's Andrew Reiner thought that MediEvil's combat system felt imprecise, and compared the game unfavorably to other remakes such as Crash Bandicoot N. Sane Trilogy and Spyro Reignited Trilogy. In line with other reviews, GamesRadar+ and VideoGamer.com praised the visuals, but criticized the outdated game design.

=== Sales ===
In the United Kingdom, MediEvil was the fifth-best-selling game in its week of release. On November 5, 2019, MediEvil was listed as the third-best-selling game of the week in a chart in the combined download and retail encompassing 43 countries.
