= Paul Darrow =

English actor (1941–2019)

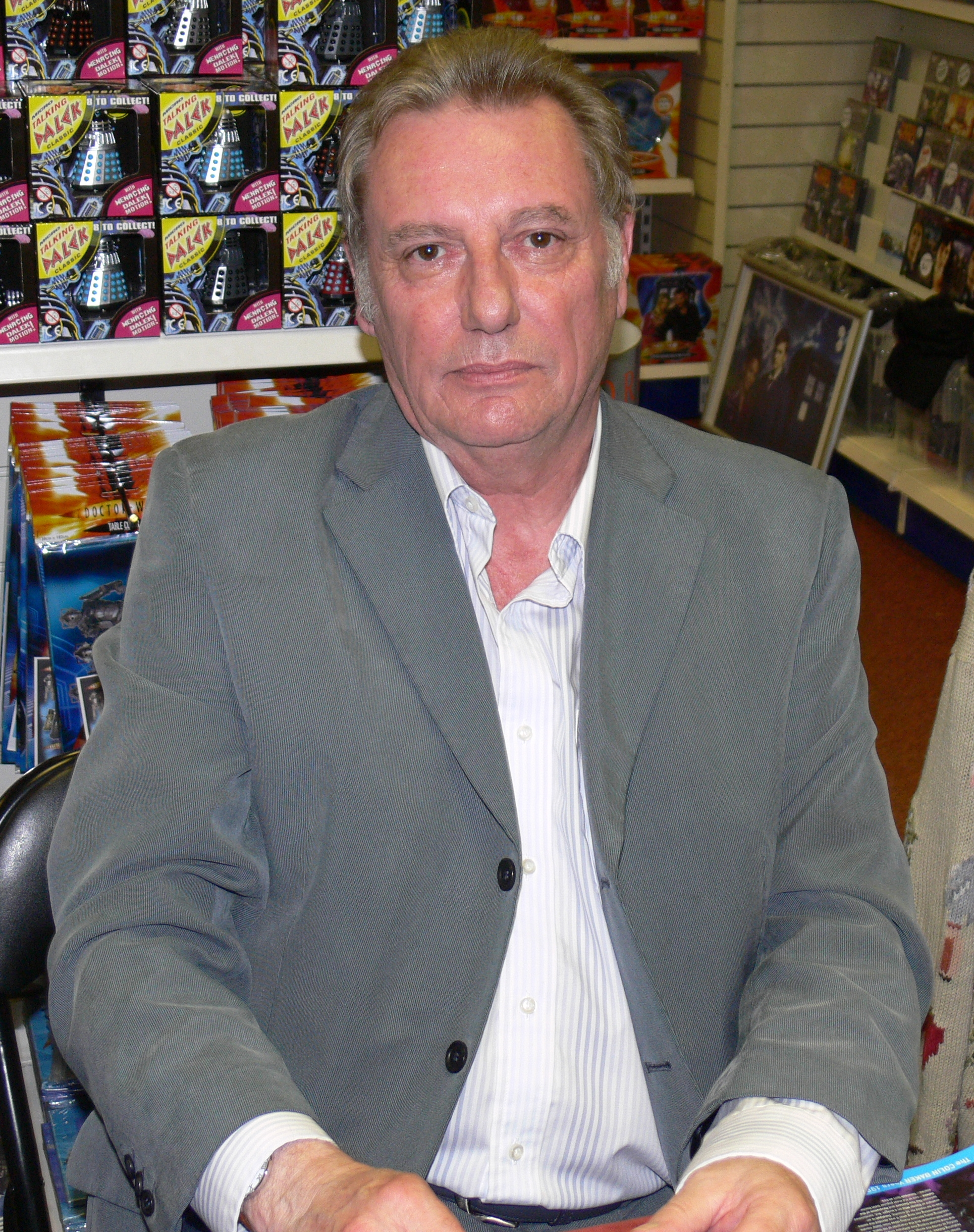
- Darrow in 2007
- Born: Paul Valentine Birkby; 2 May 1941; Chessington, Surrey, England
- Died: 3 June 2019 (aged 78)
- Education: Haberdashers' Aske's Boys' School; Royal Academy of Dramatic Art
- Occupation: Actor
- Years active: 1963–2019
- Known for: Blake's 7
- Spouse(s): Janet Lees Price
- Website: www.avon-paul-darrow.co.uk

Paul Darrow (born Paul Valentine Birkby; 2 May 1941 – 3 June 2019) was an English actor and writer. He became best known for playing Kerr Avon in the BBC science fiction television series Blake's 7 between 1978 and 1981. His many television roles included two appearances in another BBC science fiction series, Doctor Who, playing Captain Hawkins in Doctor Who and the Silurians (1970) and Tekker in Timelash (1985). He was also the voice of "Jack" on independent radio stations JACKfm and Union JACK, whose lines included dry-witted comments pertaining to current events.

== Early years ==
Darrow was born Paul Valentine Birkby in Chessington, Surrey, on 2 May 1941. He received his formal education at Haberdashers' Aske's Boys' School, before studying at the Royal Academy of Dramatic Art. Whilst at RADA, he shared a flat with fellow actors John Hurt and Ian McShane.

== Career ==
Darrow worked extensively in theatre and television.

His television appearances include: Emergency Ward 10, The Saint, Z-Cars, Dixon of Dock Green, Within These Walls, as the Sheriff of Nottingham in the 1975 BBC series The Legend of Robin Hood, as Mr. Tallboy in the 1973 adaptation of Dorothy L. Sayers' Murder Must Advertise, as Thomas Doughty in the television film Drake's Venture, Dombey and Son, Maelstrom, Making News, Pie in the Sky, Hollyoaks, Toast of London and Little Britain. He provided the voiceover for Biblical quotations in Richard Dawkins's The Root of All Evil?. He had a one-off appearance in the 1990 series of Cluedo, but did not play the murder victim. He was also the presenter of the BBC3 reality series Hercules (2004).

Darrow appeared as the character Avon, for which he was best known, in all but the first episode of Blake's 7. In the mid-to-late 1990s, he purchased the rights to Blake's 7 and attempted to produce a big-budget follow-up mini-series, Blake's 7: A Rebellion Reborn. According to Darrow, it would have been set 25 years after the final episode of the BBC series.

His film credits are few, but include roles as doctors in The Raging Moon (1971) and the Bond movie Die Another Day (2002), for which he filmed but much of his material was deleted before the film was released in cinemas.

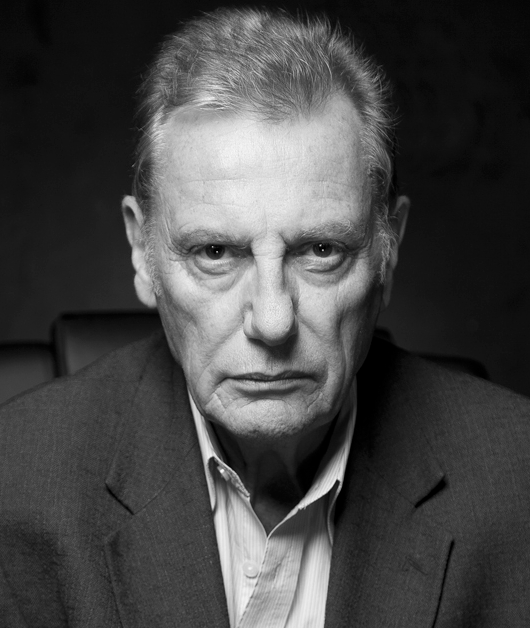
Portrait of Paul Darrow in 2012

Darrow recorded voice-overs and straplines for UK JACKfm station in Oxfordshire. He also provided the voice of the character Grand Moff Tarkin in the computer game Star Wars: Empire at War. He also voiced the character of Zarok in the PlayStation game MediEvil; his recordings were re-used in the game's 2019 remake. Darrow appeared in Emmerdale from 13 July 2009, playing Eddy Fox, Alan Turner's friend; he knows Turner as "Tank". He also played the character of Kaston Iago in the Kaldor City audio releases.

Darrow also provided the voice of a main character in the PC game Hostile Waters: Antaeus Rising.

In October 1980, Darrow had a leading role as Stephen Bradley in BBC Radio 4’s 7-part adaptation of Jeffrey Archer’s debut novel Not a Penny More, Not a Penny Less, narrated by Archer himself.

Darrow played the role of Sam Vimes in the 1998/99 touring production of the play based on Terry Pratchett's Discworld novel Guards! Guards!.

In 2000, Darrow provided the voiceover for the Walking with Dinosaurs CD-ROM game, published in association with the miniseries.

In 2004, Darrow was the subject of the fourth volume of MJTV's "The Actor Speaks" audio CDs, featuring frank interviews and dramatic pieces, alongside guest Peter Miles, with a piece specifically written by Tanith Lee.

Darrow narrated the 2008 audio book of Terry Nation's classic children's story Rebecca's World: Journey to the Forbidden Planet (2008)

In December 2011, Darrow voiced the character of Overseer Tremel in the Bioware MMORPG release Star Wars: The Old Republic.

In 2012, Darrow returned to the role of Kerr Avon in Big Finish Productions' Blake's 7: The Liberator Chronicles, a series of dramatic readings which take place during Series One, Two and Three of the original show. He also reprised the part in Blake's 7: The Classic Audio Adventures, a full-cast audio drama series.

In 2015, Darrow starred as Paul Rand, the enigmatic business man in charge of the business institute Atlas in the interactive video game Contradiction: Spot the Liar!.

Darrow was Patron of the University of York Astronomy Society (AstroSoc) from 1981 to 1984.

An extinct crocodile from the Miocene of Australia, Baru darrowi, was named after Darrow.

On 27 October 2018, Darrow appeared on (and won) a celebrity sci-fi edition of the quiz show Pointless, along with fellow Blake's 7 cast member Michael Keating.

== Personal life ==
In the mid-1960s Darrow married the actress Janet Lees Price. They were married almost fifty years, until her death in 2012, and lived in later life in Billingshurst, West Sussex.

== Illness and death ==
In his last years Darrow suffered a decline in health. In October 2014, he had an aortic aneurysm, and due to complications during its treatment, surgeons had to amputate both his legs. He died on the morning of 3 June 2019 at the age of 78. The 2019 remake of MediEvil , which featured Darrow as the voice of the main antagonist Zarok, was dedicated to his memory.

== Publications ==
- Avon: A Terrible Aspect (1989) (ISBN 0-8065-1112-5), a Blake's 7 prequel novel about Avon's father and Avon's own early life.
- Queen: The eYe (1997) (ISBN 978-0-7522-0371-3), a novelisation of the video game of the same name.
- You're Him, Aren't You? (2006) (ISBN 1-84435-236-6), autobiography. (Re-released as an audio book narrated by Darrow in 2016.)
- Lucifer (2013) (ISBN 978-1-78178-047-3), first of a trilogy of books set after the events of Blake's 7.
- Lucifer: Revelation (2014) (ISBN 978-1-78178-390-0), second of a trilogy of books set after the events of Blake's 7.
- Lucifer: Genesis (2015) (ISBN 978-1-78178-387-0), third of a trilogy of books set after the events of Blake's 7.

== Filmography ==
=== Film ===
Year	Title	Role	Notes
1964	Dr. Strangelove	Navigator Lt. Sweets	Uncredited
1970	Mister Jerico	Receptionist	
1971	The Raging Moon	Doctor	
2002	Die Another Day	Doctor	
2006	Battlespace	Horondo the Computer	Direct-to-video

=== Television ===
Year	Title	Role	Notes
1963	The Odd Man	Salesman	Episode: "A Pattern of Little Silver Devils"
1965–1966	Emergency Ward 10	Mr Verity	56 episodes
1967	The Saint	Omar	Episode: "The Gadic Collection"
1968	Virgin of the Secret Service	Sayid	Episode: "The Pyramid Plot"
1968	Frontier	Captain Hume	Episode: "His Lordship"
1968, 1978	ITV Playhouse	Anthony Eden / Julian	2 episodes
1969	The Newcomers	Cedric McDermott	2 episodes
1969	Special Branch	Lawyer	Episode: "Smokescreen"
1969	Coronation Street	Doctor	2 episodes
1969–1971	The Flaxton Boys	Captain Sterman / Wellington Moth / The Venerable	3 episodes
1969, 1973	Z-Cars	Trench/Jerry Shand	3 episodes
1970	Manhunt	Eddie	Episode: "The Losers"
1970, 1985	Doctor Who	Captain Hawkins / Tekker	Doctor Who and the Silurians/Timelash
1971	The Rivals of Sherlock Holmes	Doctor Hart	Episode: "A Message from the Deep Sea"
1973	Lord Peter Wimsey	Mr Tallboy	Serial: "Murder Must Advertise"
1974	Churchill's People	Marcellus	Episode: "Pritan"
1974–1975	Within These Walls	Dr Green	2 episodes
1974, 1976	Dixon of Dock Green	Tony Kinsley/Pearce	2 episodes
1975	The Poisoning of Charles Bravo	Charles Bravo	3 episodes
1975	Prometheus: The Life of Balzac	Cador	Episode: "The Human Comedy"
1975	The Legend of Robin Hood	Sheriff of Nottingham	TV miniseries
1976	Couples	Ralph Hewitt	6 episodes
1976	Killers	Edward Abinger	2 episodes
1976	When the Boat Comes In	Barford	Episode: "A Pillowful of Buttercups"
1977	Rooms	Peter Wishart	3 episodes
1977	Yes, Honestly	Bernard	Episode: "The Man Who Shot Bernard Vallance"
1978–1981	Blake's 7	Kerr Avon	51 episodes
1979	Penmarric	Robert Yorke	1 episode
1980	Hammer House of Horror	Andrews	Episode: "Guardian of the Abyss"
1980	Drake's Venture	Thomas Doughty	TV movie
1983	Dombey & Son	James Carker	TV miniseries
1985	Maelstrom	Oliver Bridewell	TV miniseries
1989	Storyboard	George	Episode: "Making News"
1990	Cluedo	Mr. Jeremy Hope	Episode: "A Bridge Too Far"
1990	Making News	George	6 episodes
1991	Dark Justice	Perth	Episode: "Nowhere to Hide"
1991	Fiddlers Three	Reggie Parsons	Episode: "The Man Most Likely To"
1991–1992, 2009	Emmerdale	Eddy Fox/Patrick	12 episodes
1992	Haggard	Jack	Episode: "Mad Jack"
1992	Science Fiction	Sir Arthur Conan Doyle	Episode: "Sherlock Holmes and the Case of the Missing Link"
1996	Pie in the Sky	Colin Wilkes	Episode: "New Leaf"
2000	The Strangerers	C.D.	6 episodes
2000	Rough Magik	Mr Moon	TV movie
2002	Hollyoaks	Judge	1 episode
2004	Little Britain	Conservative MP	1 episode
2005	Twisted Tales	Mr De Vere	Episode: "Flat Four"
2009–2011, 2013–2014	Law & Order: UK	Prentice	7 episodes
2014	Toast of London	Duncan Clench	Episode: "Desperate Measures"

=== Video games ===
Year	Title	Role	Notes
1996	Gender Wars	Professor Jonathan Henry Smythe	Voice actor
1997	Queen: The eYe	Voices	Voice actor, also wrote the novelisation based on the game
1998	MediEvil	Zarok	Voice actor
2000	Imperium Galactica II: Alliances	English version, various voices	Voice actor
2001	Hostile Waters	Walker	Voice actor
2003	Primal	Ferai Shaman/The Watcher	Voice actor
2005	MediEvil: Resurrection	Zarok	Voice actor
2006	Star Wars: Empire at War	Grand Moff Tarkin	Voice actor
2011	Star Wars: The Old Republic	Overseer Tremel/Additional voices	Voice actor
2014	Elite Dangerous	MinuS	Voice actor, DLC pack
2015	Contradiction: The Interactive Murder Mystery Movie	Paul Rand	FMV
2019	MediEvil	Zarok	Archive sound, dedicated to his memory

=== Radio and CD audio dramas ===
Year	Title	Role	Notes
Oct 1980	Not a Penny More, Not a Penny Less	Stephen Bradley	7-part BBC Radio 4 adaptation of Jeffrey Archer’s debut novel
1998–1999	Blake's 7	Kerr Avon	2 stories: "The Sevenfold Crown" and "The Syndeton Experiment"
2001–2004	Kaldor City	Kaston Iago	6 episodes
2005	Doctor Who - The Monthly Adventures	Guidance	Serial: "The Next Life"
2005	The Adventures of Luther Arkwright	Cromwell	
2010	Rebecca's World - Journey to the Forbidden Planet	Narrator	
2012–2016	Blake's 7: The Liberator Chronicles	Kerr Avon/Narrator	17 episodes
2013–2020	Blake's 7: The Classic Audio Adventures	Kerr Avon	33 episodes
