= MediEvil =

1998 video game

- European cover art
- Developer: Sony Computer Entertainment Europe
- Publisher: Sony Computer Entertainment
- Director: Chris Sorrell
- Producer: Chris Sorrell
- Designer: Jason Wilson
- Artist: Jason Wilson
- Writers: Jason Wilson; Martin Pond
- Composers: Andrew Barnabas; Paul Arnold
- Series: MediEvil
- Platform: PlayStation
- Release: EU/UK: 9 October 1998; NA: 21 October 1998
- Genres: Action-adventure, hack and slash
- Mode: Single-player

MediEvil is a 1998 action-adventure game developed and published by Sony Computer Entertainment for the PlayStation. The game is set in the medieval Kingdom of Gallowmere and centers around the charlatan protagonist, Sir Daniel Fortesque, as he makes an attempt to stop antagonist Zarok's invasion of the kingdom whilst simultaneously redeeming himself.

Development began in 1995 at Millennium Interactive in Cambridge under the working title of Dead Man Dan. The visuals are heavily influenced by Tim Burton's The Nightmare before Christmas. Originally conceived as an arcade-style shooter for platforms such as Windows and the Sega Saturn, Sony's purchase of the developer evolved the game into a PlayStation title. The game received mostly positive reception from critics upon release, with praise including its blend of Halloween-themed visuals, but was criticized for its controls and cumbersome camera-work.

It was released in Europe, the UK, and North-America in 1998, and in Japan in 1999. It was also re-released on the PlayStation Network in 2007. It was followed by a sequel, MediEvil 2, in 2000. The game has also been remade twice in later years; as MediEvil: Resurrection for the PlayStation Portable in 2005 and simply as MediEvil for the PlayStation 4 in 2019.

== Gameplay ==
The first level

The game takes place across a variety of levels, many of which require certain objectives to be performed to progress. Sir Daniel Fortesque can use a variety of weapons, consisting of close range weapons such as swords and clubs to long range weapons such as crossbows. Many can be charged for a powerful attack and some, such as the club, can be used to access areas that are otherwise inaccessible. When not possessing any items, Dan is able to rip his arm off and use it for both melee and ranged attacks. Dan can equip a shield alongside weapons for defence, but each type of shield has a limited amount of strength and are therefore best used sparingly. Throughout the game, Dan can visit gargoyle heads of two varieties: green ones offer Dan information while blue ones allow Dan to buy services or ammunition by using the treasures he finds.

Dan's health is determined by a health bar, which reduces when Dan is hit. It will deplete completely if Dan drowns or falls from a great height. If Dan runs out of health, the game will end. Dan can extend his maximum health by collecting Life Bottles, which will automatically refill his health bar if it drops to zero. Also hidden throughout the game are Life Vials and Life Fountains that replenish Dan's health and fill any empty Life Bottles Dan has. In each level, there is a hidden Chalice of Souls which can be collected if the player has dispatched enough enemies (some Chalices are awarded via other means). Certain enemies have no soul and therefore do not count while the levels "The Sleeping Village" and "The Haunted Ruins" include NPCs with "good souls" that will reduce the Chalice percentage if killed. If the player clears a level with a Chalice in hand, Dan is warped to the Hall of Heroes, where he can speak to a hero who will give him rewards, such as weapons. If the player finishes the game with all the Chalices, the true ending is revealed.

== Plot ==
In the year 1286, an evil sorcerer named Zarok plotted to take over the kingdom of Gallowmere with his undead army. It is told in legend that the champion, Sir Daniel Fortesque, led the King of Gallowmere's army to victory and managed to kill Zarok before he succumbed to his mortal wounds. In reality, however, Dan was struck down by the first arrow fired in the battle, with the king choosing to cover it up and declare Dan the "Hero of Gallowmere". Zarok, meanwhile, went into hiding. 100 years later, Zarok reappears, casting a spell over Gallowmere to plunge it into eternal night, awaken his undead army and steal the souls of the living. However, in the process, he unwittingly revives Dan, who has over time become a skeletal corpse, missing his jaw which fell off and the left eye he lost in the battle of Gallowmere. Having been unable to ascend to the fabled Hall of Heroes for his ignoble death, Dan uses this opportunity to defeat Zarok, save Gallowmere and earn his place as a true hero.

As Dan travels across Gallowmere, fighting his way through Zarok's hordes and confronting all manner of beasts, he soon arrives at Zarok's lair, fighting off Zarok's skeletal personal guard using the souls of his old allies retrieved by collecting the Chalices. After also managing to defeat Zarok's champion, Lord Kardok, (who also died from being struck in the eye in the battle of Gallowmere by Dan's crossbowman and second in command, Canny Tim) Zarok turns into a powerful monster (form of a dragon), but Dan manages to defeat him. As Zarok uses his last breath to cause his lair to collapse in an attempt to take Dan with him (inadvertently crushing himself in the process), Dan escapes and Zarok's magical influence over the land is thwarted, thus restoring the souls back to the living and putting the dead back to rest. With the magic cast on him also wearing off as a result, Dan returns to his burial chamber where he once again enters eternal slumber. If the player has managed to collect all the Chalices, Dan will ascend to the Hall of Heroes, where he is hailed as the rightful Hero of Gallowmere.

== Development ==
Development of MediEvil began in late 1995 at independent developer Millennium Interactive in Cambridge. Chris Sorrell, previously known for the James Pond series of games, created the original concept for MediEvil and served as the game's creative director. Sorrell joined Millennium, with whom he had been working with for a while, after completing James Pond 3. When asked what he wanted to do, he said he wanted to work with someone on the visual side. Jason Wilson, who would be the designer and a writer for the game, met up with Sorrell and began working on MediEvil.

Don't care about graphics! Do care about processes!

— Dave Burrows, explaining the studio's development process in a retrospective "post-mortem"

According to Sorrell, the first design proposal for the game had the working title ‘Dead Man Dan’ and described a game that was initially a fusion of Capcom's Ghost'n Goblins combined with the art style of Tim Burton's The Nightmare Before Christmas. As development progressed, lead artist Wilson pushed the game into more of a Zelda role playing game-influenced direction as opposed to the original arcade-style concept. Looking to attract a major publishing deal, Millennium Interactive initially began working on multiple platforms including Windows and the Sega Saturn before giving Sony Computer Entertainment a working demo of the game. Impressed by the progress, Sony signed MediEvil to be an exclusive PlayStation game. During the production of the demo, there was a programmer for each platform. Millennium was having financial difficulties and wanted to secure a publisher quickly. Sega and Microsoft were also interested in the game.

The developers wanted the game to possess a unique lead character, thus Sorrell worked with script doctor Martin Pond whilst creating an expansive backstory for the lead protagonist, Sir Daniel Fortesque. Pond came up with the idea that Sir Daniel could have been a pompous failure in life whose reincarnation was his one shot at redemption. This idea, along with the player-character's unusual appearance, turned appealing to some sectors of the gaming community, as lead designer Wilson later recalled that female gamers considered Sir Daniel to be endearing, and was considered a sex symbol in France.

In 1997, six months after approval of the project, Sony Computer Entertainment Europe would acquire the development team at Millennium Interactive from CyberLife while integrating the team as their second development unit at Cambridge; the third European developer under the company after Psygnosis and Sony's Soho-based unit. It helped ease financial strain on the project, but did not assist the studio's inexperience with making 3D games. The takeover was also "quite intimidating" to Sorrell and Wilson, who had not held conferences. Sorrell stated the concept of conferences was "totally alien". He felt that the game started to feel like a major project after a few meetings.

Sorrell admitted in a retrospective interview that MediEvil presented "a mountain of challenges", since they, as many other developers at the time, were new to 3D gaming. He also admitted that some members of the team spent long nights without sleeping in order to finish the game on time. He described it as "a huge learning project" for the team. During development, the Cambridge team played beta versions of successful platformers such as Super Mario 64 and Crash Bandicoot which helped them understand how they might solve some challenges in building a 3D action game for the first time.

Sony requested that MediEvil should support the PlayStation analogue controller, which Sorrell described as a "particularly fortuitous event" as it allowed them to capture much more fluidity and intuitiveness within the game. New concepts such as camera and character control presented many drawbacks and required the team to try out a number of approaches before settling on solutions that seemed to work. The team finally settled on the concept that MediEvil would support both analogue and digital camera-related controls for balance reasons. Sorrell stated that a spline camera view was the first attempt, but he disliked it due to the lack of freedom for the player to feel as if he was exploring. It was then changed to a free-form camera view, which "just worked". There were also many levels and ideas from the original concept that the team were forced to remove due to time or budget constraints. There was intended to be a platform-oriented section of the game where the player would control the worm that lived in Daniel's skull. Concept art and a separate level was created for this section, but it never materialised into the game.

Humour drove the game forward. Jokes were reflections on how the team operated. Sorrell explained that the humour was a "happy accident", and that he used it only when he thought it appropriate. Wilson said that the team were "youthful and silly", and they liked horror films and comedy. He thought the humour was "a natural extension of our personalities".

Paul Darrow voiced the character of Zarok.

=== Music ===
MediEvil PlayStation game credits track
30 second music sample from the MediEvil PlayStation game's final credits sequence

The original soundtrack of the game was composed by Paul Arnold and Andrew Barnabas, the musical duo more commonly known as "Bob & Barn". SCE Cambridge instructed them to compose a Danny Elfman-influenced score, similar to those of Beetlejuice, The Nightmare Before Christmas and Batman Returns. The music was created using electronic synthesisers to simulate an entire orchestra and organ.

The 2005 PlayStation Portable re-imagining MediEvil: Resurrection used parts of the MediEvil score, along with original elements composed by Bob & Barn that was performed by a live orchestra and choir. An album was made from this music and signed copies can be purchased from the artists' website.

== Marketing and release ==
Sorrell explained that, during the marketing campaign, the team were frequently asked to go to graveyards for photo-shoots. These usually went without incident, but on one occasion a vicar asked them why they were filming on church property. They lied by telling him that they were students filming a documentary on churches. Marketing campaigns also incorporated Sony Cambridge Studio's humour.

MediEvil was first released in North America and Europe in October 1998. The Japanese version, titled MediEvil: Yomigaetta Gallowmere no Yūsha, (Note: MediEvil: Yomigaetta Gallowmere no Yūsha (メディーバル 〜甦ったガロメアの勇者〜)) was released on 17 June 1999. The character of Fortesque proved unpopular there, because Japanese audiences considered the idea of a skeleton being the protagonist strange. The game was later released with C-12: Final Resistance in a two-disc pack on 9 May 2003. It was also re-released on the PlayStation Network in 2007. In 2011, MediEvil was released on Android, although it is only compatible with PlayStation-certified devices such as the Sony Xperia Play.

== Reception ==
Reception

Aggregate score
Aggregator	Score
GameRankings	80%

Review scores
Publication	Score
Computer and Video Games	2/5
Edge	7/10
GameRevolution	A−
GameSpot	8.2/10
IGN	7.8/10; 5.9/10 (PSP)
Next Generation	3/5
Play	86%
Know Your Mobile	4/5 (Android)

The game received positive reviews from critics upon release. It received an aggregate score of 80 percent from GameRankings and was mostly praised for its Halloween-influenced atmosphere by many critics. IGN's Chris Roper praised the game's sense of humour and unique presentation, but was skeptical about the game's "sloppy" controls and disjointed level designs, noting that the game's graphics did not age well over time as compared to the PSP remake which offered superior graphics and gameplay. Game Revolution praised the humour and combat, calling the game "one of the cleverest platform games ever made" and noting that its use of music, voice acting and full-motion video made up for its weaker graphics compared to Banjo-Kazooie. Edge's reviewer believed the game is "well crafted in some respects, underdeveloped in others": the "ingenious" feel was praised, but many levels were felt to be simple cases of maze navigation. The reviewer of Computer and Video Games criticised the game's repetitiveness, but said it "looks nice, and plays OK". The reviewer of Next Generation liked the dark humour, but complained about the camera, saying it does not smoothly keep up with the character. The conclusion was that MediEvil merely repeated what had already been done. Joystick's reviewer thought that MediEvil would be a new whim for players.

The music and atmosphere were the mostly praised aspects of the game. Many reviewers compared the visuals to be similar to Tim Burton's The Nightmare Before Christmas, Joe Fielder of GameSpot credited MediEvil for its original look and number of unique puzzles, but criticised the camera work, summarising that a "tighter camera control" would have been a necessity. Randy Nelson of IGN considered the game to be a homage to Capcom's Ghosts & Goblins, stating that the game took too many inspirations from others and not enough innovation was put into it to make it "unique". Nelson praised the environment of the game but considered the gameplay to be best suited for "a mindless hack-'n-slash romp".

MediEvil was named as a finalist by the Academy of Interactive Arts & Sciences for "Console Adventure Game of the Year" and "Console Game of the Year" during the 2nd Annual Interactive Achievement Awards.

The Android version was described as "rather expensive" by Damien McFerran of Know Your Mobile, but he praised the humour and the amount of content, which he said made the game stand out from other 3D action games on Android.

=== Sales ===
The game has been re-released as a "PlayStation Platinum" title in 1999, meaning it sold at least 400,000 copies in Europe.

== Remakes ==
- In 2005, a "reimagining" was released on the PlayStation Portable under the title MediEvil: Resurrection. The gameplay is similar, but there are several additional minigames and plot elements.
- An eponymous PlayStation 4 remake was released in 2019. It was developed by American studio Other Ocean Emeryville. The original 1998 game can be unlocked in the remake by completing special objectives.
