= Jan Chappell =

English actress

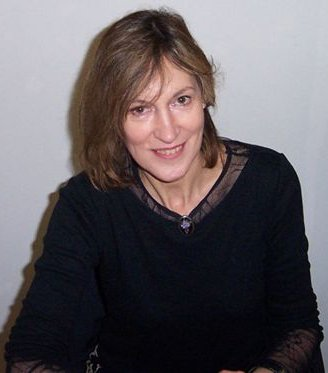
- Jan Chappell at the Blake's 7 Series 2 DVD launch, 2005
- Born: Janet Victoria Chappell; Brixton, London, England
- Education: Royal Academy of Dramatic Art
- Occupation: Actress
- Years active: 1965–present
- Known for: Blake's 7

Janet Victoria Chappell is an English actress, known for her portrayal of Cally in the first three series of Blake's 7. She was born in Brixton, London, and trained at the Royal Academy of Dramatic Art. Her television appearances include The Naked Civil Servant, Reilly, Ace of Spies, Mr. Palfrey of Westminster, Inspector Alleyn Mysteries, The House of Eliott, Boon, Lovejoy, Pie in the Sky, Holby City, New Tricks, Spooks and Rosemary & Thyme.

Chappell appeared in Ken Russell's The Devils, The Virgin and the Gipsy, Low Tide, and Basic Instinct 2. Writing about the last role, Ben Rawson-Jones reported that "Blake's 7 fans were...pleased to see their beloved Cally pop up in the film as a random solicitor....Chappell's most notable post-Cally role in science fiction was in the direct-to-video Doctor Who spinoff Shakedown: Return of the Sontarans in 1995. Parts in The Bill, Boon, Spooks and New Tricks have ensured a regular stream of work, in addition to plenty of stage performances."

Her theatre work has included work in Nottingham for Roland Joffe, Leicester and Stoke-on-Trent with Peter Cheeseman, three seasons with the Royal Shakespeare Company, including a notable production of Richard II, starring Ian Richardson, directed by John Barton. She performed in the plays of Peter Handke, Snoo Wilson, Arnold Wesker, Caryl Churchill, Howard Barker and in Mike Bartlett's My Child, directed by Sacha Wares at the Royal Court Theatre, London.

Chappell appeared in three of the Tribunal plays for Nicolas Kent, including The Colour of Justice (about the Stephen Lawrence Inquiry) at the Tricycle Theatre in Kilburn, London. She played Presiley Baxendale (lawyer for the Scott Inquiry into "Arms for Iraq") in Half the Picture. She played the human rights lawyer, Gareth Peirce, in Guantanamo, which subsequently transferred to London's West End and was also performed in the Raeburn Building (US Congress) in Washington.

From 1999 to 2000, Jan Chappell also appeared in three episodes of MJTV's original audio sci-fi CD series Soldiers of Love as Sharliken and Mom.

In April 2010, she appeared at the Royal Exchange Theatre, Manchester in A Comedy of Errors directed by Paines Plough and Royal Shakespeare associate director Roxana Silbert.
