= Cally (Blake's 7) =

- Blake's 7 character
- First appearance: Time Squad
- Last appearance: Terminal (Regular) Rescue (voice)
- Portrayed by: Jan Chappell

In-universe information
- Species: Auron
- Gender: Female
- Affiliation: Resistance

Cally is a fictional character from the British science fiction television series Blake's 7, played by Jan Chappell from 1978 to 1981. She is the titular subject of an audio drama released in August 2009.

== Development ==
It was originally intended that Cally would wear black contact lenses to make her look more alien. Jonathan Bignell and Andrew O'Day write that "Cally (Jan Chappell), conceived much later as an alien from the planet Saurian Major, is introduced in the fourth episode 'Time Squad'. In early drafts of the episode 'she was explicitly described as being like 'an Israeli terrorist girl' and her name echoes Kali, the Hindu goddess of death. In the final televised version she is the only survivor of a guerrilla force that attacked the Federation, and comes closest to paralleling Blake's political aims."

== Fictional biography ==
=== Character overview ===
Cally was the only alien amongst the original crew, a native of the planet Auron. She left her home world to help the resistance fighters on Saurian Major and was subsequently exiled by her isolationist people. When a chemical poison was dropped on the rebels, she was the only survivor and was determined to make a suicide attack on the base until she met and joined with Blake. She was initially ashamed to return to Auron because she was the only survivor of the resistance.

Cally was the only member of the original seven who was not a convicted criminal. Like other members of the Auron race, Cally was telepathic and her psychic abilities were a great asset to the crew. On the other hand, it occasionally made her susceptible to being taken over by telepathic influence ("The Web," "Shadow," "Sarcophagus"). While her initial role was monitoring communications, she eventually became a skilled medic and pilot. Initially as fanatical as Blake in fighting the Federation, she, along with Gan, became the moral "conscience" of the crew, once even questioning Blake whether destroying Star One was worth the "many many (innocent) people" he would kill as a result. She even questions his entire crusade, wondering if he has made them all 'fanatics' to which Blake becomes defensive. Cally has come a long way from the rebel who would kill until she was killed on Saurian Major, developing the conscience which Blake never showed in his terrorist acts.

While Cally was rather distant and philosophical at first, as the series went on she became more connected to the crew and would display a dry wit on occasion.

Tragedy eventually marked Cally. Servalan, in a gambit to have herself cloned, deliberately infected Auron with a disease to which she alone had the cure. Almost all of the Aurons were killed, including Cally's twin sister Zelda. Cally herself was later killed by Servalan's explosives on Terminal in series four opener Rescue, whilst calling out to Blake with her last thoughts.

Avon confirmed her death after returning to the ruined and collapsing tunnels. He was very certain when he tells Tarrant, his voice becoming softer, as it is often when talking to or about Cally, and then he looks away in the distance.

== Reception ==
The character has been positively received by fans and critics alike. Ben Rawson-Jones describes the character as "Blake's 7 fans’… beloved Cally." In a review of her debut, John Bensalhia writes, "One of the most popular regulars, Cally is well portrayed by Jan Chappell right from the word go. Initially, she's seen as a tough-as-nails freedom fighter, hostile to Blake, and ready to commit suicide after the deaths of her fellow companions. Already at this story, we're given some clue as to how Cally interacts with her future friends - she looks up to Blake as the leader, Vila's clearly taken with her, but Cally is more interested in Avon, who, amazingly, seems to return the interest, given his distrust of other people. It's a shame that Cally's part would be watered down in future stories - especially in Season Two, where she's mostly stuck glum-faced behind the teleport controls - but here at least, she gets a strong debut."

In a more scholarly analysis, Camille Bacon-Smith writes, "In the Blake's 7 character Cally, who can never experience the telepathic presence of another because her people are dead and the humans cannot communicate on her level, the loneliness of many women who feel that they give understanding but receive nothing back to nurture their sense of belonging finds representation." Bacon-Smith identifies further a contrast between Mr. Spock and Cally, noting how unlike Spock, "the telepathic alien Cally on Blake's 7 could send thoughts but could only receive those sent by another telepath. Separated from her own people, Cally could communicate with others at the level of the mind, but she could never receive communication in return. Whereas for Spock telepathy diminished the solitude of the alien, for Cally telepathy only made her alien solitude more acute. Bacon-Smith goes on to argue that while "Mr. Spock represents the positive value of an understanding merged with the other, Cally represents the tragedy when comprehension of the totality of the other is forever denied."

== Audio drama ==
In the Blake's 7 Productions audio drama series Blake's 7: The Early Years three Callys appear in the story Blood and Earth: Ariane (played by Amy Humphreys), Jorden (played by Barbara Joslyn), with Jan Chappell playing an elder relative, "Cally Secundus" (the second Cally ever to be born on Auron).

Two more Callys, Katrina (nicknamed "Skate", played by Susannah Doyle) and her twin sister Merrin (played by Natalie Walter), feature in the B7 Productions audio drama Flag and Flame.
