= Avon: A Terrible Aspect =

First edition (publ. Citadel Press)

Avon: A Terrible Aspect is a science fiction novel by Paul Darrow set in the fictional Blake's 7 universe. It was Darrow's debut novel, first published hardcover in 1989, with copyright shared between Darrow and Terry Nation, the original creator of the Blake's 7 universe. The novel can be regarded as a prequel to the Blake's 7 storyline, recounting the life story of Kerr Avon, whom Darrow played in the TV show, from shortly before his conception to moments before his first meeting with Roj Blake and his co-conspirators.

== Avon's first name ==
In the Blake's 7 series, Avon's first name is usually given as Kerr, with a double r. However, in the novel it is consistently spelled Ker with a single r. This is explained as a short form of his full name Kerguelen, said to mean desolation. The latter is either a misunderstanding or poetic licence on Darrow's part, probably based on the Kerguelen Islands in the southern Indian Ocean, which are sometimes known as "Desolation Islands." The name Kerguelen is, however, not a direct translation of "desolation", but a reference to the discoverer of the archipelago. (Note: One interesting suggested reason why Darrow may have deliberately chosen to use Kerguelen is that, like Avon, the name is of Celtic origin, Avon being the Welsh word for river. See Avon.) Since the novel consistently uses Ker, this form is preferred for use in this article.

== Synopsis ==
The story begins approximately 26 or 27 Earth years (Note: When first meeting Maco, a future accomplice in his scheme to defraud the Federation banking system, Avon mentions his age as 26 Earth years. Avon: A Terrible Aspect, pp. 142-143.) before the events of Blake's 7 proper, when Rogue Avon, a former professional assassin defected from the Federation death squads, on the run from his former employers, briefly meets a young woman called Rowena and fathers a child, the future Ker Avon, before continuing his attempts to evade his pursuers and reach Earth.

The first part of the novel follows the further adventures of Rogue Avon as he travels from Phax, a fictitious moon of Uranus, through the Clouds of Magellan to Earth, where he is eventually killed by his half brother Axel Reiss, who has remained loyal to the Federation. The second part of the novel details Rowena's endeavours to raise her son Kerguelen and avenge his father; however, she fails in the latter and is killed on Reiss' orders. The third part portrays Reiss' attempts to mould the education of the young Ker Avon in order to use him in his schemes to achieve more power in the Federation hierarchy.

In the fourth and final part of the novel, these plans misfire when Ker Avon, whose intelligence and survival skills have been honed in the challenging environment of Federation intrigue and double cross, turns the tables on Reiss and kills him, partly to avenge his father and partly as an element in his scheme to defraud the Federation banking system and abscond to a safe haven outside the Federation's sphere of influence. However, in the course of his final duel with Reiss, Avon sustains injuries that prevent him from avoiding capture. Avon is sentenced to be deported to the prison colony of Cygnus Alpha, and the novel ends as Avon boards the Federation prison ship London, seconds before the beginning of the first season episode Space Fall in which Avon first meets Blake.

== Literary references ==
Given Darrow's background as a theatre actor, it is perhaps not surprising that the novel abounds in Shakespearean references and quotations, from the title itself—a quotation from Henry V—to Raher quoting Julius Caesar several times in his final conversation with Avon.
