= MediEvil (series) =

Action-adventure hack and slash series of games by SCE Studio Cambridge

- The MediEvil logo, as used in the remake of MediEvil
- Genres: Action-adventure, hack and slash
- Developers: SCE Studio Cambridge; Other Ocean Interactive
- Publisher: Sony Interactive Entertainment
- Creators: Chris Sorrell; Jason Wilson
- Composers: Andrew Barnabas; Paul Arnold
- Platforms: PlayStation; PlayStation Portable; PlayStation 4
- First release: MediEvil; 9 October 1998
- Latest release: MediEvil; 25 October 2019

MediEvil is a series of action-adventure games developed by SCE Studio Cambridge and published by Sony Interactive Entertainment. The series revolves around an undead charlatan knight, Sir Daniel Fortesque, as he attempts to restore peace to the fictional Kingdom of Gallowmere whilst simultaneously redeeming himself. The first entry in the series, MediEvil, was released for the PlayStation in 1998 and was re-released on the PlayStation Network in 2007. Its direct sequel, MediEvil 2, was released for the PlayStation in 2000. The first game received two remakes, MediEvil: Resurrection for the PlayStation Portable in 2005 and MediEvil for the PlayStation 4 in 2019.

The first three installments of the series were developed by SCE Studio Cambridge (formerly known as Millennium Interactive), a subsidiary of Sony Computer Entertainment in Cambridge. Development of the first MediEvil began in 1995 and was inspired by Tim Burton's The Nightmare Before Christmas. The game was initially aimed for multiple consoles including Microsoft Windows platforms and the Sega Saturn; however, upon being shown progress, Sony Computer Entertainment signed MediEvil to be PlayStation-exclusive and commissioned the studio as SCE Cambridge. The music for all games was composed by Andrew Barnabas and Paul Arnold, commonly known as "Bob & Barn". Critics have been mostly positive to the series, with its graphics and story being particularly praised in the first two games. However, common criticisms included lack of innovation and cumbersome camera controls.

== Games ==
Release timeline
1998	MediEvil
1999
2000	MediEvil 2
2001–2004
2005	MediEvil: Resurrection
2006–2018
2019	MediEvil (2019)

=== MediEvil ===
MediEvil is an action-adventure video game, released in Europe 9 October 1998 and North America on 21 October and in Japan on 17 June 1999. It was re-released on the PlayStation Network in 2007. The story of the game begins in the year 1286, when an evil sorcerer named Zarok plots to take over the kingdom of Gallowmere with his undead army. During the battle, a charlatan knight, Sir Daniel Fortesque, led an army that managed to kill Zarok; however, Dan was in reality struck down and killed by the first arrow fired in battle. 100 years later, Zarok reappears and casts a spell over Gallowmere to awaken his undead army. However, he unwittingly revives the corpse of Dan in the process. Dan uses this opportunity to defeat Zarok, save Gallowmere and earn his place as a true hero.

=== MediEvil 2 ===
MediEvil 2 is the second installment in the series and serves as a direct sequel to the first game. It was released on 19 April 2000 in Europe and 30 April in North America. The game takes place 500 years after the first game's events and follows series' protagonist Sir Daniel Fortesque's revival in Victorian era London as he attempts to stop sorcerer Lord Palethorn and Jack the Ripper's plans to terrorise the city by raising the dead. Dan is accompanied by Winston, a ghost sidekick, and Kira, a mummy princess who serves as the player-character's love interest. The game features several improvements over the original, including improved enemy artificial intelligence, increased strategy combat, larger and more detailed levels, more powerful and diverse range of strategic weapons, and a more detailed characterisation and storyline.

=== MediEvil: Resurrection ===
MediEvil: Resurrection is the third installment in the series and is a re-imagining of the first game. It was released as a launch title for the PSP on 1 September 2005 in Europe and 13 September in North America. It was re-released for the PlayStation Network in 2008. Similar to the first game, it is set in the medieval Kingdom of Gallowmere and centres around the charlatan protagonist, Sir Daniel Fortesque, as he makes an attempt to stop antagonist Zarok's invasion of the kingdom whilst simultaneously redeeming himself. Unlike the original, Dan is accompanied by Al-Zalam, a genie whose powers were taken away by Zarok. The game features updated graphics and a variety of voice talents, including Tom Baker as the narrator and the Grim Reaper.

=== Remake ===
A second remake of MediEvil for the PlayStation 4 was developed by Other Ocean Interactive and released in October 2019. The game is simply titled MediEvil.

== Development ==
All three games of the series were developed by Cambridge-based SCE Studio Cambridge, formerly known as Millennium Interactive. Chris Sorrell, previously known for the James Pond series, created the original concept for MediEvil and served as the first game's creative director. The original design proposal for the game had the working title "Dead Man Dan", and was described by Sorrell as a "fusion" of Capcom's Ghost'n Goblins combined with the art style of Tim Burton's The Nightmare Before Christmas. As development progressed, lead artist Jason Wilson asserted the game into more of a The Legend of Zelda role-playing video game-influenced direction as opposed to the original arcade-style concept. Looking to attract a major publishing deal, Millennium Interactive initially began working on multiple platforms including Windows 95 and the Sega Saturn before giving Sony of Europe a demonstration of the game. Impressed by the progress, Sony signed MediEvil to be an exclusive PlayStation game and commissioned SCE Studio Cambridge as Sony's second studio in the United Kingdom.

SCE Cambridge felt that the game should possess a unique lead character; therefore, Sorrell collaborated with script doctor Martin Pond whilst creating a backstory for the lead protagonist, Sir Daniel Fortesque. Pond created the idea that Sir Daniel could have been a failure in life whose reincarnation was his only attempt at redemption. This idea, along with the player-character's unusual appearance, turned appealing to some sectors of the gaming community, as lead designer Jason Wilson later recalled that female gamers considered Sir Daniel to be "endearing". MediEvil was one of the first games to be developed for exclusive use with the PlayStation analogue controller. During development, Sony requested that the game should utilise the new functions of the controller, which was described as a "particularly fortuitous event" by Sorrell.

In 1999, after the success of the first MediEvil, Sony requested that SCE Cambridge develop a sequel that would be released before the end of the PlayStation's lifespan. Chris Sorrell, who previously served as director of the first game, was not involved in development thus the project was handed over to James Shepherd. SCE Cambridge decided it would not be difficult to make a sequel to the first MediEvil, considering that the ending of its predecessor would give the team an opportunity to set the next game in a different time period. Shepherd settled on MediEvil 2 being set in the Victorian era, the centrepiece of the Neo-Gothic revival. Shepherd considered the hardest part of the development was deciding how to make the game superior to its predecessor through making certain aspects of the game humorous. To achieve this end, the studio recoded various core technology, which Shepherd considered was arguably similar to "starting from scratch". By the time the game reached beta status the game offered larger levels, improved non-player character (NPC) logic, and more fighting abilities for the player-character.

Development of MediEvil: Resurrection began in 2003. Sony of Europe wanted a launch game for the PlayStation Portable and ordered SCE Cambridge to develop the game in time for the console's release. Due to the short notice, the studio was given only a year to develop a game, thus it was decided that a remake of the original MediEvil would be feasible as developing an original title would have taken considerably longer. New additions to Resurrection included an expanded plot, added mini-games, extra characters, multiplayer facilities and a cloud save function.

=== Music ===
The soundtrack of the first game was composed by Paul Arnold and Andrew Barnabas, the musical duo more commonly known as "Bob & Barn". SCE Cambridge instructed them to compose a Danny Elfman-influenced score, similar to those of Beetlejuice, The Nightmare Before Christmas and Batman Returns. The music was created using electronic synthesizers to simulate an entire orchestra and organ. The music for MediEvil 2 was also composed by "Bob & Barn". MediEvil: Resurrection used parts of the original MediEvil score, along with elements composed by Bob & Barn that was performed by a live orchestra and choir. An album was made from this music and signed copies can be purchased from the artists' website.

The soundtrack in MediEvil: Resurrection is orchestrated, unlike the first installment. Approximately half of the themes from the original were removed while new themes were created to fit with the new levels. The music is split into two halves; the cues from the first half are largely reminiscent of a select number of cues from the original game with the addition of extra thematic elements to strengthen them. The other half of the music is original and composed exclusively for Resurrection. The new soundtrack was composed by Bob & Barn and features performances from members of the City of Prague Philharmonic Orchestra that was recorded in the Czech Republic. The orchestra, headed by Nic Raine, consisted of approximately 80 performers and in addition benefits from a 32 piece choir, also recorded in the same venue. This was in similar vain to SCE Studio Cambridge's previous orchestral game Primal, which was also recorded in Prague by the same performers.

== Reception ==
Aggregate review scores
Game	GameRankings	Metacritic
MediEvil	80% (PS)	
MediEvil 2	79% (PS)	
MediEvil: Resurrection	69% (PSP)	66/100 (PSP)

Overall, the MediEvil series has received positive to mixed reviews from critics. MediEvil and MediEvil 2 were mostly praised upon release, with the atmosphere, visuals and music of both games being the prominently commended aspects. Chris Roper of IGN praised the game's sense of humour and unique presentation, but was sceptical concerning the game's "sloppy" controls, "disjointed" level designs and noted that the game's graphics did not age well over time, in comparison to the graphically superior PSP remake. Joe Fielder of GameSpot credited the first MediEvil for its original look and number of unique puzzles, but criticised the camera work. Reviewing MediEvil 2, Doug Perry of IGN praised the graphical advancements of the game, noticing that the sharper detail brings out a more "sophisticated feel" to the story and the new addition of cutscenes create a better sense of continuity and story. Shawn Sparks of Game Revolution similarly praised the improved graphics of the second game, noting that smooth frame rate and sharper graphics brought out the original PlayStation's power despite nearing the end of its lifespan. At the 2000 BAFTA Interactive Entertainment Awards, MediEvil 2 won the best console game category.

MediEvil: Resurrection received largely mixed reviews from critics upon release. General criticisms of the game were directed at the camera controls, combat sequences, and occasional frame rate drops. Both Kristan Reed of Eurogamer and Jason Allen of IGN expressed concern over the camera work, stating that the camera was "sloppy" and that it proved particularly difficult during combat. However, the graphics and celebrity voice talent were praised; especially Tom Baker's role as the narrator and Grim Reaper. Greg Mueller of GameSpot praised the soundtrack and dialogue, with Reed citing that Baker's voice performance was "majestic" and "eccentric". MediEvil creators Chris Sorrell and Jason Wilson expressed disappointment with the game, with Wilson stating that he felt disheartened with having to watch something he "cherished" to be altered with decisions he thought were "questionable". Sorrell felt similar disappointment in the redesign of the game and there were a number of aspects of it that he disagreed with.

== Other media ==
A graphic novel written by original co-creators Chris Sorrell and Jay Gunn, titled MediEvil: Fate's Arrow, was released by Titan Comics on 29 October 2019 to coincide with the release of the PS4 remake. The story picks up after the events of MediEvil 2 and sees Fortesque travel back in time to before the events of the first game. The series is referenced in the PlayStation 5 launch title Astro's Playroom.

In 2025, writer and producer Ben Mekler stated that a MediEvil film had been in development at one time, and that the film would have featured original songs by Tenacious D. Mekler had previously worked with Tenacious D vocalist Jack Black on the 2022 television series Kung Fu Panda: The Dragon Knight.
