= Blake's 7 =

British science fiction television series (1978–1981)

- The logo used for the first three series
- Created by: Terry Nation
- Starring: Gareth Thomas; Michael Keating; Sally Knyvette; Paul Darrow; David Jackson; Peter Tuddenham; Jan Chappell; Jacqueline Pearce; Stephen Greif; Brian Croucher; Josette Simon; Steven Pacey; Glynis Barber
- Theme music composer: Dudley Simpson
- Country of origin: United Kingdom
- Original language: English
- No. of series: 4
- No. of episodes: 52 (list of episodes)

Production
- Producers: David Maloney (series 1–3); Vere Lorrimer (series 4)
- Camera setup: Multi-camera (studio)
- Running time: 50 minutes

Original release
- Network: BBC1
- Release: 2 January 1978 – 21 December 1981

Blake's 7 is a British science fiction television programme produced by the BBC. Four series of thirteen 50-minute episodes were broadcast on BBC1 between 1978 and 1981. It was created by Terry Nation, who also wrote the first series, produced by David Maloney (series one to three) and Vere Lorrimer (series four), and the script editor throughout its run was Chris Boucher, who wrote nine of its episodes. The main character for the first two series was Roj Blake, played by Gareth Thomas.

Blake's 7 was broadcast in 25 other countries. It had a low budget but featured many tropes of space opera, such as spaceships, robots, galactic empires and aliens. Critical responses have been mixed; some praised the programme for its dystopian themes, strong characterisation, ambiguous morality and pessimistic tone, as well as displaying an "enormous sense of fun", but others have criticised its production values and dialogue, and accused it of lacking originality. It retains a sizeable and enthusiastic fan base, and was described in The Guardian's 40-year retrospective as "a bold show that wasn't afraid to break formulas".

A limited range of Blake's 7 merchandise was issued, and books, magazines and annuals were published. The BBC released music and sound effects from the series, and several companies made Blake's 7 toys and models. Four video compilations were released between 1985 and 1990, and the entire programme was released in videocassette beginning in 1991 and re-released during 1997, and as four DVD boxed sets between 2003 and 2006. The BBC produced two audio dramas during 1998 and 1999, featuring original cast members, that were broadcast by BBC Radio 4. Although proposals for live-action and animated remakes have not been realised, Blake's 7 has been revived with several series of audio dramas from Big Finish featuring the original cast, and an audio drama reboot with new cast from B7 media.

Starting in 2024 the series was released on Blu-ray, one series per year with updated special effects for all episodes.

== Overview ==
Four series of thirteen 50-minute episodes were made, and first broadcast in the United Kingdom between January 1978 and December 1981 by BBC1. They are set in the third century of the second calendar (this is mentioned in associated publicity material, not in the series) and at least 700 years in the future.

Blake's 7's narrative concerns the exploits of political dissident Roj Blake, who leads a small group of rebels against the forces of the totalitarian Terran Federation that rules the Earth and many colonised planets. The Federation uses mass surveillance, brainwashing, and drug pacification to control its citizens. Blake is arrested, tried on false charges, and deported to a remote penal colony. En route, he and fellow prisoners Jenna Stannis and Kerr Avon break free and escape on a technologically advanced alien spacecraft, which its central computer 'Zen' refers to as the Liberator (a word Jenna was thinking when the ship probed her mind). Liberator's speed and weaponry are far superior to any Federation craft, and it also has a teleportation system that enables transport to the surface of planets. It also contains rooms filled with clothes and precious gemstones, and a medical bay facility. After freeing fellow prisoners Vila Restal and Olag Gan from the penal colony, and recruiting alien telepath freedom fighter Cally, Blake and his new crew use the Liberator to begin a campaign to damage the Federation, but are pursued by Space Commander Travis—a vengeful Federation officer—and Servalan, the Supreme Commander and later Federation President.

The composition of the titular "seven" changes throughout the series. The initial group—Blake, Vila, Gan, Jenna, Avon, and Cally—included Zen as the seventh member. At the end of the first series, they capture a supercomputer named Orac. Gan is killed during the second series, and the five remaining humans and two computers make up the defacto seven. After the end of the second series, Blake and Jenna disappear and are replaced by new characters Dayna and Tarrant. At the start of the fourth series, Cally dies and is replaced by Soolin. After the destruction of Liberator, the computer Zen is replaced by a new computer, Slave, on board the group's new commandeered ship Scorpio.

While Blake is an idealistic freedom fighter, his associates are petty crooks, smugglers and killers. Avon is a technological genius who, while apparently motivated by self-preservation and wealth, consistently acts to help others. By the third series, after Blake has gone missing, Avon becomes the leader. At first, Avon believes the Federation has been destroyed; he becomes tired of killing, and seeks rest. However, by the middle of the third series, Avon realises that the Federation is expanding again, faster than originally realised, and he resumes the fight.

The BBC had originally planned to conclude Blake's 7 at the end of its third series, but a further series was commissioned unexpectedly following the broadcast of its final episode. As a result, some changes to the programme's format were inevitable, both in front of and behind the camera. These included the appointment of a new producer and the introduction of a new spacecraft, Scorpio, and new characters, Soolin and Slave.

Blake's 7 was watched by an average of 9 million viewers in the UK, and was broadcast in 25 other countries.

== Characters ==
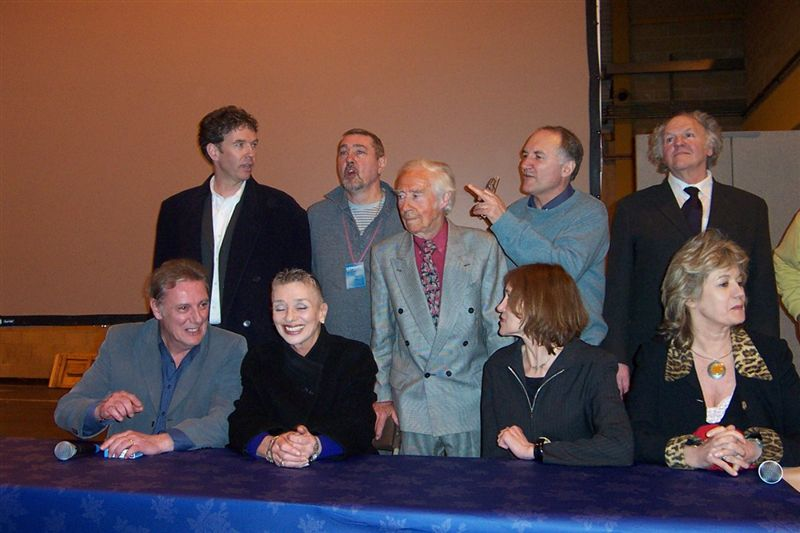
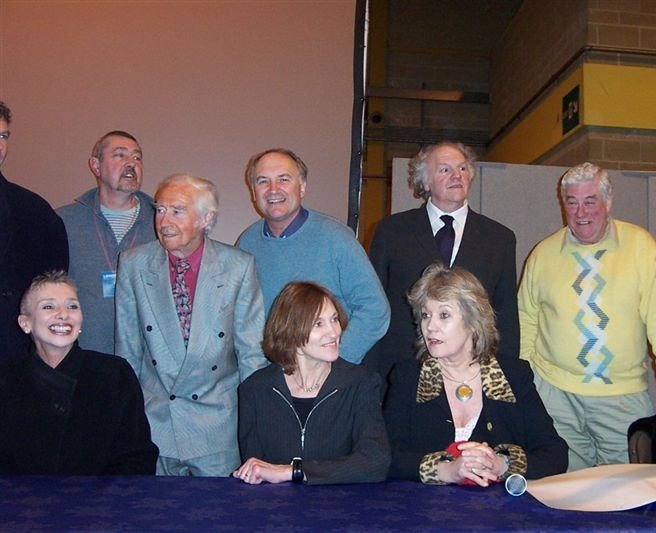
Blake's 7 cast at the presentation of the first series DVD, 2004.

=== Regular characters ===
- Roj Blake, played by Gareth Thomas (leader of the crew in series 1–2, guest appearances in series 3–4). Blake is a long-term political dissident who uses the Liberator to wage war on the Federation. He is passionately opposed to the Federation's injustice and corruption, and he is prepared to lose his life in pursuit of its destruction. He thinks nothing of placing himself in danger to protect his crew or advance his cause. Although Blake is respected by many of his crew members, Avon accuses him of fanaticism and recklessness.
- Kerr Avon, played by Paul Darrow (series 1–4, leader of the crew in series 3–4). Avon is an electronics and computer expert who once attempted to steal 5 million credits from the Federation banking system. He distrusts emotion, and he attempts to pursue a code based on logic and reason. This frequently causes conflict with Blake. He becomes a reluctant rebel and, at times, he seems motivated by financial gain and shows his readiness to put companions in danger in order to protect himself. He has an ambiguous and sometimes playful relationship with Servalan. Avon appears in 51 of the series' 52 episodes, being absent only in the first episode, "The Way Back".
- Vila Restal, played by Michael Keating (series 1–4). Vila is a skilled thief, lock-picker and conjurer and is usually reluctant to risk his life. His behaviour is often cowardly and, although other crew members regard him as tiresome, he has a high IQ. He has weaknesses for alcohol and women, and apparently talks to himself at times. Vila is the only character to appear in every episode of the series.
- Jenna Stannis, played by Sally Knyvette (series 1–2). Jenna is a former space smuggler and skilled pilot who becomes adept at piloting Liberator. She has a great deal of affection for Blake, and she is loyal to him once he gains her trust. In earlier episodes, Jenna often maintains her opinions stubbornly.
- Cally, played by Jan Chappell (series 1–3). Cally is an alien guerrilla fighter from the planet Auron. She is a telepath, like all of her people, who can transmit thoughts silently to others. She later develops mind-reading, telekinesis and precognition abilities, but she is also uniquely vulnerable to telepathic control by alien forces. Cally develops as the moral conscience of the group, especially for later episodes of series 2 and throughout series 3.
- Dayna Mellanby, played by Josette Simon (series 3–4). The daughter of former dissident Hal Mellanby, Dayna is an expert in weapons technology. She is adept at designing mechanized weapons but also appreciates the nobility of what she describes as more 'primitive' combat. Brave and loyal, but at times reckless and naïve, she often successfully challenges men who are supposedly accomplished fighters. Her vendetta against Servalan (who murdered her father) motivates her to endorse Avon's fighting of the Federation.
- Del Tarrant, played by Steven Pacey (series 3–4). Tarrant is an expert pilot who trained with the Federation before beginning illegal activities. He is ruthless and charming, and he often challenges Avon's leadership. He also takes advantage of the cowardice of Vila, whom he bullies into performing his instructions.
- Olag Gan, played by David Jackson (series 1–2). Having killed the Federation guard who murdered his girlfriend, Gan has been implanted with an electronic "limiter" device which prevents him from ever killing again. However, he is courageous, strong, and dedicated to Blake's cause.
- Soolin, played by Glynis Barber (series 4). Soolin is an expert gunfighter whose parents were murdered when she was a child on her home planet of Gauda Prime. She joins the group after she is betrayed by her partner Dorian. No-one can match her speed at drawing a gun. Soolin's logical and cynical attitude proves an asset to her colleagues. On several occasions, her quick thinking and prescient actions save the crew from perishing, overpowering the assassin Cancer and surviving the Betafarl Conspiracy. Barber had also previously played the role of a Mutoid in series 1 (episode 9: "Project Avalon").
- Orac, voiced by Derek Farr (first appearance) and Peter Tuddenham (series 2–4). Orac is a super-computer capable of reading any other computer's data and built by an inventor named Ensor. It uses a component called a Tariel cell—a universal computer component—and can access information stored on any computer that uses one. It can also control other computers. Orac dislikes work that it considers unnecessary, enjoys gathering information and has delusions of grandeur.
- Zen, voiced by Peter Tuddenham (series 1–3). The main computer aboard Liberator, Zen controls the craft's secondary systems, including the battle and guidance computers. It is susceptible to interference from outside influences, such as Orac. It is considered a character in its own right. It is rendered nonfunctional after Liberator is damaged by corrosive fluid particles, and is destroyed with the ship.
- Slave, voiced by Peter Tuddenham (series 4). Introduced during the fourth series, Slave was built and programmed by Dorian and is the master computer of Dorian's ship, Scorpio. It has a cringing personality, frequently apologetic and obsequious, and addresses Avon as 'master' and others as 'sir' or 'madam'.

=== Other recurring characters ===
- Supreme Commander Servalan/Commissioner Sleer, played by Jacqueline Pearce. Servalan began her service career as a cadet, and eventually becomes Supreme Commander of the Terran Federation. Her desire for power began at the age of eighteen when her lover abandoned her. Shortly before the Intergalactic War, Servalan conducted a military coup and installed herself as president. She is later overthrown herself and presumed killed, but survives and adopts the pseudonym of Commissioner Sleer. She conducts a campaign of drug-induced pacification in order to regain territory for the Federation and her own position of power. Servalan is determined to pursue the crew of the Liberator and win control of the ship and Orac for herself.
- Space Commander Travis, played by Stephen Greif (first series) and Brian Croucher (second series). Travis is a dedicated and ruthless Federation officer, with the rank of Space Commander. His left eye and arm were destroyed by Blake, and replaced with an eye patch and a prosthetic arm fitted with a concealed weapon. Travis is known for treating his troops well and leading them personally, but also for his ruthlessness and contempt for human life. After his trial and conviction for killing civilians, Travis becomes increasingly obsessed with killing Blake.

== Sources and themes ==
Terry Nation pitched Blake's 7 to the BBC as "The Dirty Dozen in space", a reference to the 1967 Robert Aldrich movie in which a disparate group of convicts are sent on a suicide mission during World War II. This influence shows in that some of Blake's crew are escaped convicts (Avon, Vila, Gan and Jenna). Blake's 7 also draws much of its inspiration from the legend of Robin Hood, but the crew are not a band of "Merry Men": they include a corrupt computer genius (Avon), a smuggler (Jenna), a thief (Vila), a murderer (Gan), a telepathic guerrilla soldier (Cally), the Liberator's computer (Zen) and another computer (Orac). Later additions were: a naïve weapons expert (Dayna), a mercenary (Tarrant), a gunslinger (Soolin) and the Scorpio's computer (Slave). While Blake intends to use Liberator to strike against the Federation, the others are often reluctant soldiers—especially Avon. Blake and Avon's clashes over the command represent a conflict between idealism and cynicism, emotion and rationality, and dreams and practicality. Similar conflicts occur between other characters: the courage of Blake and Avon compared with Vila's cowardice, or Avon and Jenna's scepticism of Blake's ideals compared with Gan's unswerving loyalty, Blake's mass murdering methods compared with Avon's targeted and less destructive methods.

Script editor Chris Boucher, whose influence on the series increased as it progressed, was inspired by Latin American revolutionaries, especially Emiliano Zapata, in exploring the characters' motives and the consequences of their actions. This is most evident in the episode "Star One", in which Blake must confront the reality that, in achieving his goal of overthrowing the Federation, he will cause chaos and death for many innocent citizens. When Avon gains control of Liberator, after Blake's disappearance after the events of "Star One", he uses it to pursue his own agenda, such as avenging his lost love Anna Grant. Later, Avon realises that he cannot escape the Federation's reach and that he must, like Blake, resist them. In this respect, by the end of the fourth series Avon has replaced Blake.

Classic films, such as the Western The Magnificent Seven, were an important influence upon Blake's 7. Chris Boucher incorporated lines from Westerns into the scripts, much to the delight of Paul Darrow, an enthusiast of the genre. The final episode, "Blake", was inspired by The Wild Bunch and Butch Cassidy and the Sundance Kid. Blake's 7 also drew inspiration from the classic British dystopian novels Nineteen Eighty-Four by George Orwell, Brave New World by Aldous Huxley and When the Sleeper Wakes by H. G. Wells. This is most evident in the nature of the Federation, whose methods of dealing with Blake in the first episode, "The Way Back", include brainwashing and show trials. These are reminiscent of the way in which the USSR dealt with its dissidents. Explorations of totalitarianism in the series are not confined to the Federation—totalitarian control through religion ("Cygnus Alpha"), genetics ("The Web") and technology ("Redemption") are also portrayed. Such authoritarian dystopias are common in Terry Nation's work, including his Doctor Who story Genesis of the Daleks (1975).

Loyalty and trust are important themes of the series. Avon is presented with several opportunities to abandon Blake. Many of Blake's schemes require co-operation and expertise from others. Characters are often betrayed by family and friends, especially Avon, whose former lover Anna Grant is eventually revealed to be a Federation agent. The theme of loyalty and trust reaches its maximum during Blake and Avon's final encounter in the last episode ("Blake"); Blake, by now very paranoid, has been masquerading as a bounty hunter collaborating with the Federation as a front for his activities in recruiting and testing potential allies in the struggle and this causes Avon and the others to suspect him when Tarrant accuses Blake of betraying them; an ironic miscommunication between Avon and Blake precipitates the disastrous events that conclude the episode. If Blake and his crew represent Robin Hood and his Merry Men, then the Federation forces, personified by the obsessive, psychopathic Space Commander Travis and his superior, the beautiful but ruthless Supreme Commander Servalan, represent Guy of Gisbourne and the Sheriff of Nottingham.

A common theme of Nation's science fiction is the depiction of post-apocalyptic societies, as in several of his Doctor Who serials, for example The Daleks (1963–64), Death to the Daleks (1974), Genesis of the Daleks (1975) and The Android Invasion (1975) and in his series Survivors (1975–77). Post-apocalyptic societies feature in several Blake's 7 episodes including "Duel", "Deliverance", "City at the Edge of the World" and "Terminal". Although not explicitly stated, some publicity material for the series refers to the Federation as having developed after a nuclear holocaust on Earth. Noting the series's distinctive aesthetic, an academic concluded: "At its best, Blake's 7 had a peculiar intensity all its own".

Advanced technology themes were also central to multiple-episode storylines and enabling capabilities for the crew's missions. The ship the crew happened upon in the second episode, the Liberator, had faster than light travel (Standard 12) and a super-computer Zen to control different functions. Starting in the first series’s finale, Orac, a machine-brain, was a central character, providing analytical assessments and predictive capabilities that drove many of the crew's decisions and actions. In all three series, teleportation enabled rapid access to other ships or planets.

== Plot summary ==
The series is set in a future age of interstellar travel and concerns the exploits of a group of outlaws. Gareth Thomas played the eponymous character Roj Blake, a political dissident who is arrested, tried and convicted on false charges, and then deported from Earth to a prison planet. En route, he and two fellow prisoners, treated as expendable, are sent to board and investigate an abandoned alien spacecraft found drifting in space. They get the ship working, commandeer it, rescue two more prisoners, and are later joined by an alien guerrilla with telepathic abilities. In their attempts to stay ahead of their enemies and inspire others to rebel, they encounter a great variety of cultures on different planets, and are forced to confront human and alien threats. Blake's group suffer losses and casualties, and recruit newer members to join them. They perform a campaign against the totalitarian Terran Federation until an intergalactic war occurs with aliens from the Andromeda galaxy. Blake disappears and Kerr Avon then leads the group. When their spacecraft is destroyed and another group member is killed, the survivors commandeer another craft (which they enhance with superior technology), and a secret base on a distant planet from which they continue their campaign. In the final episode, Avon finds Blake and, suspecting him of betraying the group, kills him. The group is then shot by Federation guards, who surround Avon in the final scene as shots are heard over the end credits.

=== Series One (1978) ===
Roj Blake, a worker of high social status classified as "alpha-grade", lives in a domed city. Similar domes house most of the Earth's population. Blake is approached by a group of political dissidents who take him outside the city to meet their leader, Bran Foster. According to Foster, Blake was once the leader of an influential group of political activists opposed to the Federation's Earth Administration. Blake was arrested, brainwashed and coerced into making a confession denouncing the rebellion. His memory of those years was then blocked. Foster wants Blake to rejoin the dissidents. Suddenly, the meeting is interrupted by the arrival of Federation security forces, who shoot and kill the crowd of rebels. Blake, the only survivor, returns to the city, where he begins to remember his past. He is arrested, tried on false charges of child molestation and sentenced to deportation to the prison planet Cygnus Alpha.

Whilst awaiting deportation from Planet Earth, Blake meets thief Vila Restal and smuggler Jenna Stannis. On board the prison ship London, Blake meets convicted murderer Olag Gan and computer engineer and embezzler Kerr Avon. The London encounters a battle between two alien space fleets and the London's crew plot a course to avoid the combat zone and continue their voyage. They encounter a strange alien craft, board it and attempt to salvage it but are thwarted by the alien ship's defence mechanism. The commander of the London sends the expendable Blake, Avon, and Jenna across to the ship. Blake defeats the defence system when it tries to use memories he recently discovered were false. With Jenna as pilot, the three convicts escape in the alien craft.

Blake and his crew follow the London to Cygnus Alpha in their captured ship, which they have named Liberator. They retrieve Vila and Gan, while Blake leaves the other prisoners. Blake wants to use Liberator and its new crew to attack the Federation with the others, especially Avon, as reluctant followers. Blake's first target is a communications station on the planet Saurian Major. Blake infiltrates the station and is assisted by Cally, a telepathic guerrilla soldier from the planet Auron. Blake invites Cally to join the crew. With this new arrival, and including Liberator's computer, Zen, Liberator has a crew of seven.

As Blake's attacks against the Federation become bolder, he has less success. Political pressure grows on the Administration with planetary commanders threatening to leave the Federation because of its inability to protect them from Blake's attacks. Rumours abound about Blake's heroism and other rebel groups use his name for their actions. Supreme Commander Servalan appoints Space Commander Travis, who has a vendetta against Blake, to eliminate Blake and capture Liberator. Servalan often co-opts Travis for her personal projects and uses Blake as a cover for her own activities. When Travis repeatedly fails to eliminate Blake, Servalan does not assign the task to another officer and does not use more resources to eliminate him.

Blake meets a man named Ensor and discovers a plot by Servalan and Travis to seize a powerful computer named Orac, which is capable of communicating with any computer that uses a component called a Tariel Cell. Blake's crew suffers from radiation sickness but capture the device before Servalan arrives. Blake offers to perform the operation to save Ensor's life aboard the Liberator but Ensor dies when the power cells for his artificial heart are depleted before they are able to reach Liberator. Aboard the ship, Orac predicts the craft's destruction in the near future.

=== Series Two (1979) ===
Liberator, the alien starship used by Blake and his crew for series 1 to 3

The Liberator is recaptured by the people that built it and Orac's prophecy is fulfilled when it destroys an identical space vehicle. Blake wants to attack the heart of the Federation and he targets the main computer control facility on Earth. Avon agrees to help on the condition that Blake gives him Liberator when the Federation has been destroyed. Blake, Avon, Vila and Gan reach the control facility and find an empty room. Travis reveals that the computer facility was secretly relocated years before and the old location was left as a decoy. Blake and his crew escape but Travis throws a grenade in the confined area and Gan is killed by falling rubble.

After Gan's death, Blake considers the future of the rebellion, and Travis is convicted of war crimes by a Federation court martial at Space Command Headquarters aboard a space station. Blake decides to restore his group's reputation and attacks the space station but Travis escapes and continues his vendetta against Blake. Blake seeks the new location of the computer control facility. He learns that it is named Star One. When Star One begins to malfunction, Servalan also becomes desperate to find its location. The facility's failure causes many problems in the Federation. Star One controls a large defensive barrier that has prevented extra-galactic incursions. Blake discovers Star One's location and finds that, with help from Travis, aliens from the Andromeda Galaxy have infiltrated it. Vila discovers a fleet of alien spacecraft beyond the barrier. Travis partially disables the barrier. Blake and his crew overcome the aliens at Star One and kill Travis but the gap in the barrier allows the aliens to invade. Jenna calls for help from the Federation, where Servalan has conducted a military coup, imposed martial law and declared herself President. Servalan dispatches the Federation's battle fleets to repel the invaders, who begin to breach the barrier. With Blake badly wounded, Liberator by Avon's direction, alone until Servalan's battle fleets arrive, fights against the aliens.

=== Series Three (1980) ===
Liberator is severely damaged during the battle with the Andromedans, forcing the crew to abandon ship whilst Zen carries out repairs. The Federation defeats the alien invaders but the cost considerably reduces its influence in the galaxy. Blake and Jenna go missing and Avon becomes the new leader. Two new additions, weapons expert Dayna Mellanby and mercenary Del Tarrant, join the crew. Avon is less inclined than Blake to attack the Federation but Servalan realises that if she captures Liberator, the Federation will quickly restore its former power.

Servalan attempts to create clones of herself, but is thwarted when the embryos are destroyed. Avon decides to find the Federation agent who killed Anna Grant, his former lover. The group interrupts an attempt to eliminate Servalan and Avon discovers that Anna is alive and was previously a Federation agent named Bartolemew. Anna tries to shoot Avon in the back but Avon kills her and frees Servalan. Servalan lures Avon into a trap using a faked message from Blake. Servalan finally captures Liberator and maroons the crew on an artificial planet named Terminal but does not know that Liberator has been irreparably damaged after flying through a cloud of corrosive fluid particles. As Servalan leaves Terminal, the ship explodes and Servalan is apparently killed as she attempts to escape by teleporting away.

=== Series Four (1981) ===
Scorpio, the Wanderer class cargo ship used for series 4.

Booby traps, set by Servalan in her underground complex on Terminal, explode and Cally is killed. Avon, Tarrant, Vila and Dayna escape with Orac and are rescued by Dorian, a salvage operator. Dorian takes the crew in his spacecraft, Scorpio, to his base on the planet Xenon, where they meet his partner, Soolin. Dorian plans to drain the crew's life-force and take Orac but is foiled by Vila. Avon completes a new teleport system for Scorpio using the technology left behind by Dorian. Soolin joins the crew and they commandeer Scorpio and occupy the Xenon base. Avon gains control of Slave, Scorpio's main computer.

The crew acquires an experimental new stardrive that vastly increases Scorpio's speed, making it even faster than Liberator. The Scorpio crew become concerned about the speed at which the Federation is reclaiming its former territory and discover that Servalan survived the destruction of Liberator. Deposed as President of the Federation, she is using the pseudonym Commissioner Sleer and is enacting a pacification programme using a drug named Pylene-50. The Scorpio crew gain the formula for an antidote to Pylene-50 but this cannot reverse the drug's effects. Avon finds a way to synthesise the antidote and the crew attempt to create an alliance between independent worlds to resist the Federation and get the resources and manpower to mass-produce the Pylene-50 antidote. One of the alliance members, Zukan, betrays the alliance to Servalan and detonates explosives on Xenon base, which is damaged and the Scorpio crew are forced to abandon it.

Avon tells the rest of the group that Orac has traced Blake to Gauda Prime, an agricultural planet. Blake is masquerading as a bounty hunter; his latest quarry is Arlen, whom he hopes to recruit for his rebellion. Scorpio approaches Gauda Prime and is attacked. The crew, except Tarrant, use the teleport to abandon the damaged craft. Slave is damaged, Tarrant remains aboard to pilot Scorpio and is injured during a crash landing. Blake arrives, rescues and takes Tarrant to his base and purportedly captures Tarrant as bounty. Tarrant thinks that Blake has betrayed the group, and Blake lets Tarrant escape. Tarrant is nearly killed by Blake's colleagues when Avon and his crew save him, giving credence to Tarrant's accusation that Blake has betrayed them to the Federation. Becoming very suspicious of Blake, Avon kills him. Arlen reveals that she is a Federation officer and Federation guards arrive. Tarrant, Soolin, Vila, and Dayna are shot by Federation troops, who slowly surround Avon with their weapons pointed at him. Avon steps over Blake's body, raises his gun and smiles. Shots are heard over the end credits.

== Production history ==
Blake's 7 was created by Terry Nation, an experienced television scriptwriter who had previously created the Daleks for Doctor Who and created the post-apocalyptic fiction drama series Survivors. He had the idea for Blake's 7 in a moment of inspiration during a pitch meeting with Ronnie Marsh, a BBC drama executive. Marsh was intrigued and immediately commissioned a pilot script. When he had seen the draft, Marsh approved Blake's 7 for full development. David Maloney, an experienced BBC director, was assigned to produce the series and Chris Boucher was engaged as script editor. Nation was commissioned to write the thirteen episodes. Boucher's task was to expand and develop Nation's first drafts into workable scripts, but this became increasingly difficult as Nation started running out of ideas. Meanwhile, Maloney was struggling with the low budget available given the need for action and special effects. Despite these challenges, Blake's 7 was very popular, with some episodes exceeding ten million viewers. A second series was quickly commissioned.

The BBC engaged new writers for the subsequent series. It was decided that one of the regular characters should die, to demonstrate that Blake and his crew were not invincible. Gan, played by David Jackson, was chosen because Gan had been under-used and was the least popular character. Although ratings declined compared to the first series, the BBC commissioned a third. When Gareth Thomas and Sally Knyvette decided not to return, new characters were required so that the story could continue without its titular character. Suggestions for a replacement actor for Blake were rejected and Avon became more prominent in the story. New characters Del Tarrant, portrayed by Steven Pacey, and Dayna Mellanby, portrayed by Josette Simon, were introduced.

Blake's 7 was not expected to be recommissioned after the third series and there was surprise when during 1980 a further series was announced as the third series ended. BBC One controller Bill Cotton had watched "Terminal" and enjoyed it greatly. He telephoned the presentation department and ordered them to make the announcement. Maloney was unavailable to work on a fourth series, so Vere Lorrimer became the producer. He introduced new characters, a new spacecraft – Scorpio – and its computer Slave. Jan Chappell (who played Cally) decided that she did not want to return, and was replaced by Glynis Barber as Soolin.

Thomas made a final appearance as Blake on the condition that his character be killed off in a definitive manner. Although the fourth series performed satisfactorily in the ratings, Blake's 7 was not renewed and the final episode had an ambiguous finale. Except for Blake, whose death was contractual, the characters were shown being attacked in such a way that their survival would have been possible had a fifth series been commissioned. The final episode, "Blake", was broadcast on 21 December 1981.

Although Blake's 7 never crossed over with Doctor Who during its initial run, Thomas was open to the idea as he was close friends with Doctor Who star Tom Baker, and the two wanted to be "briefly crossing paths" with one another before going their separate ways. Ultimately, the idea was scrapped.

== Filming locations ==
Interior spaceship sets and other indoor scenes were recorded on videotape in London at BBC Television Centre, Shepherd's Bush. Some interiors were filmed at Ealing Film Studios. For indoor complexes, such as bases or command centre bunkers, filming often took place in local power plants and water turbine stations. Location shooting was also extensive, mostly in southern England. Notable locations include Quex Park in Kent, seen in episode eleven of the first series, "Bounty"; the Waterloo Tower in Quex Park was ex-president Sarkoff's residence in exile.

The series also used Betchworth Quarry as the surface of an alien planet and Wookey Hole Caves as the site of an alien mine. Additional location shooting took place at Black Park, the New Forest, the South Bank, Camden Town and Wembley Conference Centre.

== Music and sound effects ==
Blake's 7's theme music was written by Australian composer Dudley Simpson, who had composed music for Doctor Who for more than ten years. The same recording of Simpson's theme was used for the beginning titles of all four series of the programme. For the fourth series, a new recording was made for the closing credits that used an easy listening-style arrangement. Simpson also provided the incidental music for all of the episodes except for the Series One episode "Duel" and the Series Two episode "Gambit". "Duel" was directed by Douglas Camfield, who had a grudge against Simpson and refused to work with him, and so the episode contained library music. Elizabeth Parker provided the music and sound effects for "Gambit". Blake's 7 made considerable use of audio effects that are described in the credits as "special sound". Many electronically generated sound effects were used, ranging from foley-style effects for props including handguns, teleport sounds, spacecraft engines, flight console buttons and background atmospheres. The special sounds for Blake's 7 were provided by the BBC Radiophonic Workshop composers Richard Yeoman-Clark and Elizabeth Parker.

== Critical reception ==
Blake's 7 received both positive and negative reviews. The review by Stanley Reynolds in The Times of the fourth episode, "Time Squad", stated: " ... nice to hear the youngsters holding their breath in anticipation of a little terror". Reynolds elaborated, "Television science fiction has got too self-consciously jokey lately. It is also nice to have each episode complete within itself, while still carrying on the saga of Blake's struggle against the 1984-ish Federation. But is that dark-haired telepathic alien girl, the latest addition to Blake's outer-space merry men, going to spell love trouble for blonde Jenna? Maid Marian never had that trouble in Sherwood Forest."

In a 1995 overview of British science fiction television, John Clute extolled the series. He wrote that Blake's 7 "differed very successfully from most other TV space operas in eschewing black-and-white character portrayals, in being unafraid to let its major figures die...and in enabling the heroes only to irritate the oppressor". Clute also praised the show for having "compelling antihero characters".

In January 1998 Robert Hanks of The Independent compared the series's ethos to that of Star Trek. He wrote: "If you wanted to sum up the relative position of Britain and America in this century — the ebbing away of the pink areas of the map, the fading of national self-confidence as Uncle Sam proceeded to colonise the globe with fizzy drinks and Hollywood — you could do it like this: they had Star Trek, we had Blake's 7 ... No 'boldly going' here: instead, we got the boot stamping on a human face which George Orwell offered as a vision of humanity's future in Nineteen Eighty-Four". Hanks concluded that "Blake's 7 has acquired a credibility and popularity Terry Nation can never have expected ... I think it's to do with the sheer crappiness of the series and the crappiness it attributes to the universe: it is science-fiction for the disillusioned and ironic — and that is what makes it so very British".

The science fiction writer Justina Robson has stated that she was a fan of Blake's 7 as a child: "It was the most fantastic thing I'd ever seen. I completely lived for it and adored it." After rewatching the show as an adult, Robson criticised the show's special effects, but lauded the programme’s scripts, saying that Blake's 7 was "a great adventure".

Gavin Collinson of the British Film Institute's website Screenonline wrote "The premise of Blake's 7 held nothing remotely original. The outlaw group resisting a powerful and corrupt regime is an idea familiar from Robin Hood and beyond." He added "Blake's 7's triumph lay in its vivid characters, its tight, pacey plots and its satisfying realism...For arguably the first time since the 1950s Quatermass serials, the BBC had created a popular sci-fi/fantasy show along adult lines". His review concludes "Ultimately, the one force the rebels could not overcome proved to be the BBC's long-standing apathy towards science fiction. However, the bloody finale, in which Avon murders Blake, exemplified the programme's strengths — fearless narratives, credible but surprising character development and an enormous sense of fun." In 2015, Tim Stanley of The Daily Telegraph described the series as "oft-derided" and "gloriously low budget" but "a genuine classic". He added: "this was superior drama performed by consummate professionals who made it believable by being 100 per cent committed to the material. Blake's 7's sets and dresses were bright and gaudy but it was dark, dark melodrama." Stanley concluded: "Blake's 7 can be read as a document of the Callaghan/Carter years with their piles of rubbish in the streets. Then along came Thatcher/Reagan and sci-fi turned hopeful again. Cue Star Wars and its childish universe of Wookiees and Ewoks. Moral clarity returned. The budgets ballooned. But, for my money, it was nowhere near as interesting."

The Australian broadcaster and critic Clive James gave a negative appraisal, calling it " ... classically awful British television SF ... no apostrophe in the title, no sense in the plot". He continued "The depraved space queen Servalan ... could never quite bring herself to volatilize the dimly heroic Blake even when she had him square in the sights of her plasmatic spasm guns. The secret of Blake's appeal, or Blakes appeal, for the otherwise infallibly fatale Servalan remained a mystery, like the actual wattage of light bulb on which the design of Blake's spaceship, or Blakes spaceship, was plainly based". Screenwriter Nigel Kneale, whose work included The Quatermass Experiment and other science fiction, was also critical. He described "the very few bits I've seen" as "paralytically awful", saying that "the dialogue/characterisation seemed to consist of a kind of childish squabbling".

== Legacy ==
Blake's 7 deviates from the good-versus-evil dualism in Star Wars; Star Trek's 'feel-good' future; and the episodic structure of Doctor Who. Blake's 7 also influenced Hyperdrive and Aeon Flux. It has also been alleged to have influenced Farscape and Firefly, although Joss Whedon denied that it had been a conscious influence on the latter. Television playwright Dennis Potter's final work Cold Lazarus was inspired by the show.

Blake's 7 remains fairly well regarded. A poll of United States science-fiction writers, fans and critics for John Javna's 1987 book The Best of Science Fiction placed the series 25th in popularity, despite then only having recently begun to be broadcast in the US. A similar poll in Britain conducted for SFX magazine during 1999 put Blake's 7 at 16th place, with the magazine commenting that "twenty years on, TV SF is still mapping the paths first explored by Terry Nation's baby". During 2005 SFX surveyed readers' top 50 British telefantasy shows of all time, and Blake's 7 was placed at number four behind The Hitchhiker's Guide to the Galaxy, Red Dwarf and Doctor Who. A similar poll conducted by TV Zone magazine during 2003 for the top 100 cult television programmes scored Blake's 7 11th.

Dutch musician Arjen Anthony Lucassen was inspired by Blake's 7 in naming his side-project Star One.

In 2004 a 15-minute comedy short entitled "Blake's Junction 7" debuted at several film festivals around the world. It was directed by Ben Gregor, written by Tim Plester, and featured Mackenzie Crook, Martin Freeman, Johnny Vegas, Mark Heap and Peter Tuddenham. This parody depicted the characters taking a break at the Newport Pagnell motorway service area. During 2006 the BBC produced a 30-minute documentary The Cult of... Blake's 7 that was first broadcast on 12 December on BBC Four, as part of a Science Fiction Britannia series.

== Planned revival ==
The revival of Blake's 7 has been mooted for some years. Terry Nation raised the possibility on a number of occasions and proposed that a new series would be set some years after the existing one. Avon, living in exile like Napoleon on Elba, would be persuaded by a new group of rebels to resume the fight against the Federation.

=== Radio and audio ===
During 1998 Blake's 7 was broadcast again by the BBC on radio. The Sevenfold Crown was broadcast by BBC Radio 4 on 17 January 1998 as part of its Playhouse strand. The play was produced by Brian Lighthill and written by Barry Letts. Paul Darrow, Michael Keating, Steven Pacey, Peter Tuddenham and Jacqueline Pearce reprised their television roles, but Josette Simon and Glynis Barber were replaced by Angela Bruce as Dayna and Paula Wilcox as Soolin. The story was set during the fourth series between the episodes Stardrive and Animals. This was followed by The Syndeton Experiment, which featured the same cast, producer and writer and was broadcast as The Saturday Play on 10 April 1999 by BBC Radio 4. BBC Audiobooks released a CD of readings of Trevor Hoyle's novelisations of episodes The Way Back read by Gareth Thomas and Cygnus Alpha read by Paul Darrow.

On 11 December 2006, B7 Productions announced that it had recorded a series of 36 five-minute Blake's 7 audio adventures, written by Ben Aaronovitch, Marc Platt and James Swallow. This featured Derek Riddell as Blake, Colin Salmon as Avon, Daniela Nardini as Servalan, Craig Kelly as Travis, Carrie Dobro as Jenna, Dean Harris as Vila, Owen Aaronovitch as Gan, Michael Praed, Doug Bradley and India Fisher. The new series was broadcast by BBC Radio 7 and repeated during mid-2010 as three one-hour episodes: Rebel (written by Ben Aaronovitch), Traitor (Marc Platt) and Liberator (James Swallow). B7 Productions also produced series of 30-minute prequel audio episodes named Blake's 7: The Early Years, which explored the earlier histories of the central characters.

During 2011 Big Finish Productions, under licence from B7 Productions, announced that it would be producing a series of audio dramas named Blake's 7: The Liberator Chronicles, which would be " ... a series of exciting, character-driven tales that remain true to the original TV series. We're aiming for authenticity—recreating the wonder of 1978 all over again!" The company also said it would publish a series of Blake's 7 novels at a rate of two per year. During January 2013 Big Finish released an initial full-cast audio production, Warship. This was followed during January 2014 with a series of six full-cast single-disc original stories, with a second series starting in November 2014.

Several individuals and companies have produced unofficial material based upon Blake's 7. Alan Stevens, later of Magic Bullet Productions, produced three unofficial audio cassettes between 1991 and 1998: Travis: The Final Act, The Mark of Kane and The Logic of Empire. Stevens also produced a series of audio dramas named Kaldor City, created by Chris Boucher, which link the Blake's 7 universe into Boucher's Doctor Who serial The Robots of Death through the character Carnell (Scott Fredericks), whom Boucher created for the Blake's 7 episode "Weapon".

=== Television ===
During April 2000 producer Andrew Mark Sewell announced that he had bought the rights to Blake's 7 from the estate of Terry Nation, and was planning to produce a TV movie set 20 years after the finale of the original series. During July 2003, Sewell announced that he, Paul Darrow and Simon Moorhead had formed a consortium called 'B7 Enterprises' that had acquired the rights and was planning a television miniseries budgeted at between five and six million U.S. dollars. Darrow would play Avon and the series was to be televised during early 2005, depending on " ... many factors, not least financing". Paul Darrow subsequently left the project during December 2003, citing "artistic differences".

B7 Enterprises announced on 31 October 2005 that it had appointed Drew Kaza as non-executive chairman, and that it was working on two Blake's 7 projects. Blake's 7: Legacy was to be a two-part, three-hour mini-series, which would be written by Ben Aaronovitch and D. Dominic Devine. Blake's 7: The Animated Adventures was to be a 26-part children's animated adventure series written by Aaronovitch, Andrew Cartmel, Marc Platt and James Swallow. In an interview with Doctor Who Magazine, writer and producer Matthew Graham said that he had been involved in discussions to revive Blake's 7. Graham's concept was that a group of young rebels would rescue Avon, who had been kept cryogenically frozen by Servalan, and then roam the galaxy in a new ship named Liberator.

On 24 April 2008, television station Sky1 announced that it had commissioned two 60-minute scripts for a potential series, working alongside B7 Productions. On 4 August 2010, the station said it had decided not to commission the series. B7 Productions said the decision was " ... obviously disappointing", but that the development process has resulted in the " ... dynamic reinvention of this branded series". It said it was confident it would find another partner to develop a new version of Blake's 7 for television.

During July 2012, Deadline reported that a remake for US television networks was being developed by the independent studio Georgeville Television. The Syfy network announced on 22 August that Joe Pokaski would develop the script and Martin Campbell would direct the new remake.

On 9 April 2013, the BBC reported that a new series of Blake's 7 would be broadcast by SyFy. Other media reported that a full-series order of thirteen episodes had been placed. Again, however, no new series materialised.

In January 2026, director Peter Hoar and producer Matthew Bouch were announced to be developing a reboot through their Multitude Productions label.

== Merchandise ==
Terry Nation had done well financially from commercial exploitation of the Doctor Who Daleks, and recognised the potential for merchandise related to Blake's 7. Nation and his agent Roger Hancock discussed this with Ray Williams of BBC Merchandising in December 1976. By May 1977, twenty-seven items of merchandise had been proposed for release by companies including Palitoy, Letraset and Airfix. However, only a small quantity of these was ever made available.

A small number of toys and models were produced. During 1978, Corgi produced a two-inch-long (5.1 cm) die-cast model of Liberator with a transparent rear globe. This was re-released the following year in silver with a model space shuttle, and in blue on its own. Also during 1979, Blue Box Toys produced three space vehicle toys that featured the series logo; however, these had never appeared in the television programme. Comet Miniatures produced a nine-inch-long (23 cm) injection-moulded model kit of Liberator in 1989, which contained many parts. They also produced a two-inch, white metallic Liberator model, and a three-inch Federation trooper figure. A Scorpio clip gun, and Liberator and Scorpio teleport bracelets, were also produced.

The children's programme Blue Peter offered a cheaper home-made alternative to fans who wanted merchandise. In its 23 February 1978 show, presenter Lesley Judd demonstrated how to create a replica Liberator teleport bracelet from common household objects. This was followed on 6 June 1983, when presenter Janet Ellis demonstrated a similar method of making a replica Scorpio bracelet.

=== Music ===
The sheet music of the Blake's 7 theme was published by Chappell & Co. Ltd during 1978 with a photograph of Liberator on the front cover. A stereo re-recording of Dudley Simpson's theme music, in a markedly different arrangement to the original, was also released as a single, with The Federation March (a piece of incidental music from the episode Redemption) on the B-side. The Blake's 7 theme was also released on an album BBC Space Themes, and Liberator was featured on the album sleeve. Another version of the theme, "Blake's 7 Disco", was recorded by Federation and released during 1979 on Beeb Records with a B-side unconnected with the series. Many of the sound effects from the series were released during 1981 as an album, BBC Sound Effects No. 26: Sci-Fi Sound Effects, and re-released later on CD as Essential Science Fiction Sound Effects Vol. 1.

=== Books and magazines ===
Blake's 7 books were produced by various authors and publishers. The first was entitled Blake's 7, written by Trevor Hoyle and Terry Nation, and published during 1978 (novelising the first-series episodes The Way Back, Space Fall, Cygnus Alpha and Time Squad). Its US title was Blake's 7 – Their First Adventure. Hoyle wrote two more books of the series: Blake's 7: Project Avalon (1979, novelising the episodes Seek–Locate–Destroy, Duel, Project Avalon, Deliverance and Orac from the first series) and Blake's 7: Scorpio Attack (1981, novelising the episodes Rescue, Traitor and Stardrive from the fourth series). Publications continued to be issued after the series had ended. Tony Attwood's Blake's 7: The Programme Guide, published by Target during 1982, is a factual overview of the series with a detailed episode guide, an encyclopedia, and interviews with the cast and writers. It was re-issued by Virgin Books during 1994. Attwood also wrote an original novel named Afterlife, which is set after the final episode and was published by Target during 1984. Another original novel, Avon: A Terrible Aspect by Paul Darrow, told the story of Avon's early years before he met Blake, and was published during 1989.

World Distributors produced Blake's 7 Annuals for 1979, 1980 and 1981. These featured stories, games, artwork and articles about space. During October 1981 Marvel UK began publishing the monthly Blake's 7 magazine, which included a comic strip by Ian Kennedy as well as text stories, features and photographs. Twenty-five issues including two 'specials' were published, until the magazine closed during August 1983. Marvel produced two 'special' magazines during 1994 and 1995, with much of the content written by television historian Andrew Pixley and about how the series was made. Seven issues of Blake's 7 Poster Magazine were published between December 1994 and May 1995.

Several books offering insight and background information to Blake's 7 were produced, including Blake's 7: The Complete Guide by Adrian Rigelsford (Boxtree, 1995), Blake's 7: The Inside Story by Joe Nazzaro and Sheelagh Wells (Virgin, 1997), A History and Critical Analysis of Blake's 7 by John Kenneth Muir (McFarland and Company, 1999), and Liberation. The Unofficial and Unauthorised Guide to Blake's 7 by Alan Stevens and Fiona Moore (Telos, 2003).

=== Home video releases ===
During 1985 BBC Video issued four compilation videocassettes containing highlights from the first three series edited into 2 hour features. The first released was The Beginning, containing excerpts from The Way Back, Spacefall, Cygnus Alpha and Time Squad. Duel was released in 1986 with highlights of Seek–Locate–Destroy, Duel and Project Avalon. During the same year Orac was released, containing excerpts from Deliverance, Orac and Redemption. The first three tapes were available in both VHS and Betamax format. The final tape, The Aftermath, was released in Australia during 1986, with extracts from Aftermath, Powerplay and Sarcophagus. During 1990 all four tapes were re-released in the UK on VHS.

From 1991, BBC Video released Blake's 7 in episodic order on 26 VHS cassettes with two episodes per tape. Canadian company BFS also released these in North America. During 1997, Fabulous Films company re-released these tapes in different packaging. The BBC and Fabulous Films planned to issue the series as four DVD box sets, but this was disrupted by conflicts with rights-holders B7 Enterprises. These issues were resolved and one series per year was released on region 2 DVD between 2003 and 2006. During 2007 Amazon sold a four-series box set, but a casualty of the difficulties with Blake's 7 Enterprises was The Making of Blake's 7, a four-part documentary directed by Kevin Davies, intended originally as an extra feature with each DVD release. B7 Enterprises said it " ... did not feel [the documentary] provided a proper tribute or fresh retrospective of the show". The discs contained extra features including bloopers, out-takes, alternative scenes, voiceover commentaries, interviews and behind the scenes footage.

On 22 August 2024, the BBC announced it would be releasing Blake's 7: The Collection – Series 1, a Blu-ray box set containing the entire first series newly remastered for the release. The set contains bonus features previously seen on the DVD release of the show alongside brand new bonus material, such as optional updated special effects on all 13 episodes, a feature-length documentary detailing the making of the first series, rare convention footage and the previous unreleased The Making of Blake's 7 documentary originally meant for the DVD release. The box set was released on 11 November 2024. A Blu-ray release for Series 2 followed in 2025.

=== Gaming ===
A retro point-and-click adventure game was developed in 2017 for the Oric platform, paying homage to the Blake's 7 TV series, and is available as a free download.

== Streaming ==
On Thursday 10 September 2020, Blake's 7 was released on the UK streaming service BritBox. BritBox UK was discontinued following ITV's buy-out of the BBC's stake in the service during 2022. In April 2025, all four series of Blake's 7 were made available on the ITVX Premium streaming platform, but subsequently deleted in October 2025.

== See also ==
- Characters of Blake's 7
- History of Blake's 7
- List of Blake's 7 episodes
