= Guerrilla Cambridge =

British video game developer

- Final logo used from 2013 to 2017
- Formerly: Sony Computer Entertainment Europe (1997–2002); SCEE Cambridge Studio (2003–2010); Cambridge Studio (2010–2013)
- Type: Subsidiary
- Industry: Video games
- Predecessor: Millenium Interactive (–1996); CyberLife Technology (1996–1997)
- Founded: 15 July 1997; 29 years ago
- Defunct: 12 January 2017
- Fate: Dissolved
- Headquarters: Cambridge, England
- Parent: Sony Computer Entertainment (1997–2005); SIE Worldwide Studios (2005–2017)

Guerrilla Cambridge (formerly SCEE Cambridge Studio and Cambridge Studio) was a British video game developer based in Cambridge, England. The studio was founded under Sony Computer Entertainment in July 1997 through the buyout of the game development division of CyberLife Technology. In 2010, SCEE Cambridge Studio was restructured as a sister studio to Guerrilla Games under the name Guerrilla Cambridge and shut down in 2017. The studio is best known for developing the MediEvil series.

== History ==
On 15 July 1997, Sony Computer Entertainment (SCE) announced that it, through its London-based division, was to acquire the game development division of CyberLife Technology for an undisclosed sum, as well as rights and production of future games such as MediEvil. CyberLife had previously developed games under the name "Millennium Interactive", including Diggers and Creatures, but changed its name in 1996 when developing artificial intelligence technology and "artificial life" simulations became its primary focus. The bought-out team was integrated into a new internal studio for Sony under Sony Computer Entertainment Europe; it was later known as SCEE Studio Cambridge to distinguish from Team Soho. CyberLife would later change its name to Creature Labs in November 1999 before shutting down in 2003, with some assets and staff acquired by Gameware Development.

The Cambridge team would work on the hit game Primal after working on the MediEvil series. The studio would be renamed SCEE Cambridge Studio after Team Soho was spun out independently from SCEE; it would be renamed yet again to Cambridge Studio in 2010.

In January 2012, SCEE announced a restructuring of its United Kingdom-based studios; within this move, SCEE Cambridge Studio became a sister studio to Guerrilla Games to bring Guerrilla's Killzone series to PlayStation Vita. Within the same year, SCEE Cambridge Studio assumed the name "Guerrilla Cambridge". An undisclosed number of staffers were let go from Guerrilla Cambridge and other United Kingdom-based studios owned by SCE in March 2014. Guerrilla Cambridge was closed down on 12 January 2017 as a result of a regular review process within SCE's Worldwide Studios division.

== Games developed ==
=== As Sony Computer Entertainment Europe ===
Year	Title	Platform(s)
1997	Beast Wars: Transformers	PlayStation
1997	Frogger	PlayStation
1998	MediEvil	PlayStation
2000	MediEvil 2	PlayStation
2001	C-12: Final Resistance	PlayStation
2003	Primal	PlayStation 2

=== As SCEE Cambridge Studio ===
Year	Title	Platforms	Notes	Ref.
2003	Ghosthunter	PlayStation 2		
2005	MediEvil: Resurrection	PlayStation Portable		
2006	24: The Game	PlayStation 2		
2006	Formula One Championship Edition	PlayStation 3	Supporting Studio Liverpool	
2007	Wipeout Pulse	PlayStation Portable	Supporting Studio Liverpool	
2007	Heavenly Sword	PlayStation 3	Supporting Ninja Theory	
2010	TV Superstars	PlayStation 3		
2009	LittleBigPlanet	PlayStation Portable		
2009	Killzone 2	PlayStation 3	Supporting Guerilla Games	

=== As Guerrilla Cambridge ===
Year	Title	Platform(s)
2013	Killzone: Mercenary	PlayStation Vita
2016	RIGS: Mechanized Combat League	PlayStation 4
