= Erich Kissing =

German painter

- Born: 27 September 1943; Leipzig, Germany
- Education: Werner Tübke, Hans Mayer-Foreyt
- Known for: Painting
- Movement: Leipzig School

Erich Kissing (born on 27 September 1943) is a German painter. He has a twin sister and a brother six years his senior. Their father worked as a plumber, and their mother was a housewife. He lives and works in the house his parents built in Leipzig in 1935.

Erich Kissing took private drawing classes. After training to retouch offset-prints, he studied art in Leipzig from 1965 to 1970. His studies at Hochschule für Grafik und Buchkunst was under Hans Mayer-Foreyt and Werner Tübke. His modern art is a part of the Realist–Leipzig School movement.

Erich Kissing's painting sometimes uses glazing techniques. The painting consists of several layers. One of his motifs is hedonistic centaur. His painting Sommertag (2007–09) has a reference to Diego Velázquez's The Triumph of Bacchus.
