= C-12: Final Resistance =

2001 video game

- Developer: Sony Computer Entertainment Europe
- Publisher: Sony Computer Entertainment
- Director: Simon Gardner
- Producer: John Meegan
- Designer: Stuart Wheeler
- Programmer: Mike Froggatt
- Artist: Matt Wee
- Platform: PlayStation
- Release: EU: 6 April 2001; NA: 22 July 2002
- Genre: Third-person shooter
- Mode: Single-player

C-12: Final Resistance, stylised as (c-12) Final Resistance, is a third-person shooter video game developed and published by Sony Computer Entertainment for the PlayStation. The story is set in the future, as aliens have invaded in an attempt to harvest all of Earth's carbon resources (C-12 is a reference to ^{12}C, the most abundant Isotopes of carbon). The player controls Lieutenant Riley Vaughan, a cybernetic human soldier, and member of the underground resistance. The player undertakes missions played out in a third-person view, killing aliens and cyborgs, collecting weapons and keys. It was the last game developed by Sony Computer Entertainment Europe to be released on the PlayStation, as they would pivot their attention to the PlayStation 2. The game received mixed reviews.

== Plot ==
The game opens up at a ruined city as a Resistance dropship drops off Lieutenant Riley Vaughan to locate an attacked outpost and a missing recon team. He does this with relative ease, finding the outposts wounded soldiers and the recon team. The recon team gives him a detonator and the outpost soldiers give him some explosives. He uses the explosives to clear away a roadblock however the explosion set something off and he continues along his path. During his mission he is periodically updated by Colonel Grisham and Doctor Carter, before the mission Dr. Carter installed an alien optical implant connected to an imaging unit in Vaughan that has the ability to detect enemies and give information about them.

Riley discovers that the explosion set off an alien tank and has alerted several cyborgs in the area. He proceeds to fight the alien tank and destroys it but Col. Grisham tells him that the resistances hidden bunker has been discovered and that is under alien attack. A dropship comes and liftoffs Vaughan to the bunker. Riley discovers that the bunker is under heavy fire and that evacuation are under way. After fighting his way into the bunker Vaughan gets a radio message that the aliens are tracking down their escaping transports however the only ones that knew the GPS code are both dead: General Hammond and Major Carter. Vaughan activates a radar so that they can track the escaping transports to make sure that they are on the right path. Col. Grisham tells Vaughan that they are going to activate the bunkers self-destruct system but to do that they need General Hammond's nerve implant and tell Vaughan to go retrieve it in the medical bay. Riley discovers that the medical bay is full of droids and cyborgs and fights his way through to the cryo-tubes where the body of General Hammond is. He gets the implant and finds Col. Grisham and Dr. Carter where they scan the implant and activate the self-destruct for T-2 minutes. Vaughan escapes the exploding bunker and finds himself on the streets again. He gets a radio message from Dr. Carter to help any stranded transport or anybody who needs it. Riley battles an alien flier but bests it, he finds a downed transport and helps it reach the second bunker. A little later a flier attacks Vaughan and chases him inside a mall which used to be a resistance stronghold. Inside the auto-defenses activate and lock down the whole mall trapping Vaughan. Riley finds a Resistance technician who tells him how to bypass the malls security and gives him his master keycard. Vaughan bypasses the main computer and the auto defenses thus escapes the mall. He finds Dr. Carter in the basement of an improvised resistance outpost who gives him the key to the automatic crane, she also tells him that there is an alien base which has an alien power-source and that it can greatly help the Resistance. Riley enters the base and eliminates all threats and collects the alien power-source.

The team is ready to liftoff with the power source however the aliens (who appear for the first time) ambush them. The aliens are revealed to be giant creatures who look like critters, they use plasma weapons and personal shields to overcome the human race. One cyborg reveals himself to be Major Dan Carter, Dr. Carter's husband who kidnaps Dr. Carter. Riley kills the aliens but an alien flier escapes with Dr. Carter. Vaughan calls Col. Grisham to tell him that the aliens kidnapped Dr. Carter, Col. Grisham tells him that without Dr. Carter that alien power-source is useless and asks him where was the flier going which Vaughan replies south-west...to the conversion facilities (where captured humans are converted into cyborgs). Col. Grisham tells Riley that they need to get Dr. Carter back urgently in order to get the power-source to work. Vaughan reaches the conversion facilities through an old rail system, he sneaks and fights his way to the Dr. Carter and frees her but is trapped in a room with a not fully constructed alien war droid, Riley destroys it and escapes the facilities.

Back at the bunker, aliens have discovered it with a tracking device on Dr. Carter, and are launching a full assault. Vaughan helps any Resistance member who needs it and finally activates an alien force field so the aliens can't get in and thus stop the attack. Suddenly Vaughan spots a few resistance members trapped outside of the bunker and goes to save them. As he approaches them a group of aliens knocks him unconscious. Col. Grisham calls out a search and rescue party to save Vaughan, but is killed in the process. Riley comes out of his chamber stronger than ever but more a cyborg and less a human. Using Col. Grisham's radio he calls Dr. Carter who tells him that the aliens are planning to release a chemical weapon that will destroy everything on Earth, to stop this Riley must overload the generator in the control room. He does that and a good portion of the base explodes leaving only a small part. Further on he finds the alien leader who spots him and fights him, Vaughan is victorious and as the alien leader is dying he explodes, destroying the whole base. A dropship picks up Vaughan and takes him to safety.

== Reception ==
Reception

Aggregate score
Aggregator	Score
Metacritic	63/100

Review scores
Publication	Score
Edge	5/10
Electronic Gaming Monthly	5/10
Game Informer	7/10
GamePro	3.5/5
GameRevolution	C+
GameSpot	5.5/10
GameZone	8/10
IGN	6.8/10
Official U.S. PlayStation Magazine	2.5/5
PlayStation: The Official Magazine	8/10

C-12: Final Resistance received "mixed or average" reviews, according to review aggregator Metacritic.

GameSpot considered the game to be highly derivative of Syphon Filter. They were unimpressed with the combat mechanics and camera system but praised the visuals bearing in mind the limitations of the hardware. Overall, it was said to be "a strictly average action game."
