= MediEvil 2 =

2000 video game

- European cover art
- Developer: Sony Computer Entertainment Europe
- Publisher: Sony Computer Entertainment
- Director: James Shepherd
- Producer: Andrew Kennedy
- Artist: Jason Wilson
- Writers: James Shepherd; Jim Sangster
- Composers: Andrew Barnabas; Paul Arnold
- Series: MediEvil
- Platform: PlayStation
- Release: EU: 21 April 2000; NA: 9 May 2000
- Genres: Action-adventure, hack and slash
- Mode: Single-player

MediEvil 2 (stylised as MediEvil II in North America) is a 2000 action-adventure game developed and published by Sony Computer Entertainment for the PlayStation. It is the second instalment of the MediEvil series and a sequel to MediEvil. Taking place 500 years after the events of the first game, it follows series' protagonist Sir Daniel Fortesque's revival in Victorian-era London as he attempts to stop sorcerer Lord Palethorn and Jack the Ripper's plans to terrorise the city by raising the dead.

Following the positive reception of the first game, Sony Computer Entertainment commissioned SCE Cambridge Studio to make a sequel to MediEvil before the end of the PlayStation's lifespan. The original concepts for MediEvil 2 went through many transformations during development before the Cambridge team finally settled on making a sequel set during the Victorian Gothic revival, largely reminiscent of its predecessor.

The game received mostly positive reviews from critics upon release, with praise including slight improvements over its predecessor, such as artificial intelligence and graphical enhancements, but was criticised for lack of innovation from the original.

== Gameplay ==
A still image from the second level of the game. MediEvil 2 features various locations in Victorian-era London.

MediEvil 2 once again sees players in control of Sir Daniel Fortesque as he travels through several levels set in Victorian-era London to thwart the evil Palethorn and his undead army. Along with returning weapons and equipments such as swords and shields, Dan can now obtain more modern weaponry such as a pistol, a blunderbuss, and a gatling gun. MediEvil 2 adds a new feature that allows the player to select two weapons that Dan can toggle between in real-time. Like in the previous game, Dan can earn more weapons by finding the Chalice of Souls in each level, which is filled up by defeating enemies. Dan can also visit merchants known as Spivs for ammo and services, and speak with Winston the ghost to receive hints and save during longer levels. Collecting Life Bottles hidden in certain levels expands Dan's life meter, which can be replenished via Life Vials and Life Fountains. In the middle of the game, Dan unlocks the ability to place his head on a zombified hand to become Dan Hand, allowing him to explore areas that his normal body cannot while also being able to alternate control between them.

== Plot ==
The game's plot takes place in 1886, 500 years after Sir Daniel Fortesque's battle against the evil sorcerer Zarok in the previous game. In Kensington, a wealthy industrialist and sorcerer named Lord Palethorn discovers Zarok's spellbook and casts its spell of raising the dead over the city of London. However, the pages of the book soon scatter across London, and Palethorn gains a demon-like appearance as a result. The spell Palethorn casts once again resurrects Dan, whose body had been on display in a nearby museum. He is recruited by a professor named Hamilton Kift and his ghostly sidekick Winston Chapelmount (a play on Winston Churchill) to recover the pages of Zarok's spellbook and put a stop to Palethorn's plans. Along the way, they end up being joined by an ancient mummy princess named Kiya, whom Dan falls in love with.

When Kiya goes to Whitechapel alone to investigate psychic disturbances there, she is killed by Jack the Ripper. Broken-hearted, Dan abandons the quest against Palethorn and wanders into London's sewers, where he encounters the Mullocks, who worship a statue of Dan, and discovers a time machine that Kift had built years earlier. Collecting the parts to rebuild the time machine, Dan travels back in time to defeat Jack & save Kiya. Jack pleads with Dan to be spared, but he mercilessly shoots him dead. Dan then merges with his past self to gain golden "Super Armour", and returns to the battle. Dan collects the final pages and confronts Palethorn, who steals the page from him and offers Dan the choice of joining him, but Dan refuses, saying "I'll never join you!" Palethorn then assigns his two assistants, Mander and Dogman, to stop Dan from following him, but both are killed. Dan then goes after Palethorn. Palethorn uses the pages to summon a large blue demon. Dan manages to turn the demon against Palethorn, putting a stop to both of them. With his last breath, Palethorn drops a time bomb in a last-ditch effort to kill Dan, destroying his lair in the process. Dan escapes and decides to join Kiya in the afterlife as they return to their eternal rest. If the player has collected all the Chalices, Dan and Kiya instead go for a ride on the time machine which takes them back to the end of the first game, encountering Palethorn in a monstrous form similar to Zarok's.

== Development ==
After the success of the first MediEvil, Sony Computer Entertainment commissioned their Cambridge unit to develop a sequel that would be released before the end of the PlayStation's lifespan. Chris Sorrell, who previously served as director of the first game, was not involved in development, so the project was handed over to James Shepherd instead.

According to Shepherd, the original plot for MediEvil 2 had previous antagonist Zarok being held prisoner in the Tower of London and Sir Daniel Fortesque's objective would be to free him, but this idea was eventually dropped due it being considered identical to a "B-movie twist ending".

The Cambridge studio believed it would not be difficult to make a sequel to the first MediEvil, considering that the ending of its predecessor would give the team an opportunity to set the next game in a different time period. Shepherd settled on MediEvil 2 being set in the Victorian era, the birthplace of the Neo-Gothic revival. Shepherd considered the hardest part of the development was deciding how to make the game better than its predecessor by incorporating humorous elements in the game. To achieve this, the Cambridge studio re-coded a majority of its core technology, which Shepherd considered arguably similar to "starting from scratch". Various features cut from the previous game were added into MediEvil 2, such as playable characters and levels that featured puzzles. By the time the game reached beta status the game offered larger levels, improved NPC logic, and additional moves for the protagonist.

A remastered version of the game was released for PlayStation 4 and PlayStation 5 in January 2025.

== Reception ==
Reception

Aggregate score
Aggregator	Score
GameRankings	79%

Review scores
Publication	Score
CNET Gamecenter	8/10
Consoles +	95%
Electronic Gaming Monthly	7/10 (Note: In Electronic Gaming Monthly's review of the game, one critic gave it 7/10, two gave it each a score of 6.5/10, and another gave it 8/10.)
Game Informer	7.75/10
GameFan	95%
GameRevolution	B+
GameSpot	7.6/10
IGN	8.4/10
Jeuxvideo.com	18/20
Next Generation	3/5
Official U.S. PlayStation Magazine	3.5/5

MediEvil 2 received favourable reviews, albeit less than its predecessor, according to the review aggregation website GameRankings. The game was mostly praised for its rich detailed graphics but was criticised by many reviewers for its bad camera angles, easy difficulty, and similarity to the first game. However, Doug Trueman of NextGen called the game "a formulaic and agreeable way to pass the time."

IGN's Douglass C. Perry praised the graphical advancements of the game, noting that the sharper details drew out a more "sophisticated feel" to the story. Perry noted that the new addition of cutscenes created a better sense of continuity and story, reconstructing the game into a more controlled, broader world. Shawn Sparks of GameRevolution similarly praised the improved graphics, noting that smooth frame rates and sharper graphics brought out the original PlayStation's power, despite nearing the end of its lifespan. Sparks hailed the graphics as "eye candy" and reported that the levels were "a joy to explore."

Perry noted the game's "plain wide confusion" in level layouts would cause frustration for players, and was several times found without direction in the larger levels. Sparks also described similar concerns with the confusing level layout. Perry disliked the fixed camera positioning throughout the game and outlined that the camera was "good, not great" and only a small improvement to its predecessor. Daily Radar's Stephen Frost praised the game's improved artificial intelligence and harder difficulty in comparison to the first game, summarising that MediEvil 2 was "better, not perfect," although he thought that the game was still lacking in innovation. GamePro summed up their review by saying, "It's true that some hardcore action/adventure purists might not be able to get past MediEvil's comical look, but they'd be missing out on some topnotch gameplay. MediEvil II is good enough to wake the dead." (Note: GamePro gave the game two 4.5/5 scores for graphics and fun factor, 5/5 for sound, and 4/5 for control.)

At the 2000 BAFTA Interactive Entertainment Awards, MediEvil 2 won the best console game category. MediEvil 2 was also nominated for "10th Annual GamePro Readers' Choice Awards" for "Best Adventure Game of The Year", but lost to Shenmue for Sega Dreamcast.
