= MediEvil: Resurrection =

2005 video game

- Developer: SCEE Cambridge Studio
- Publisher: Sony Computer Entertainment
- Producer: Piers Jackson
- Designer: Dominic Cahalin
- Artist: Mitch Phillips
- Writers: Patrick McCarthy; Martin Pond; Dominic Cahalin
- Composers: Andrew Barnabas; Paul Arnold
- Series: MediEvil
- Platform: PlayStation Portable
- Release: PAL: 1 September 2005; NA: 13 September 2005
- Genres: Action-adventure, hack and slash
- Modes: Single-player, multiplayer

MediEvil: Resurrection is a 2005 action-adventure game developed by SCEE Cambridge Studio and published by Sony Computer Entertainment for the PlayStation Portable. It is a re-imagining of the first installment in the series, MediEvil. It was first released as a launch title in September 2005 in North America and Europe. The game is set in the medieval Kingdom of Gallowmere and centres around the charlatan protagonist, Sir Daniel Fortesque, as he makes an attempt to stop antagonist Zarok's invasion of the kingdom whilst simultaneously redeeming himself. The game also features a variety of voice talents, including Tom Baker as the narrator and the Grim Reaper.

Development of the game began in 2003 with the original intention of releasing the game for the PlayStation 2. Sony Computer Entertainment Europe commissioned SCE Studio Cambridge to develop a launch title for the PlayStation Portable. Due to time constraints, the Cambridge studio was given only a year to develop the game, thus they decided to remake the original MediEvil. The game was met with mixed reviews upon release, with critics mainly praising the game's humor, voice talent and graphics but was criticized for lack of innovation and cumbersome camera controls.

An emulated version of the game was released via the PlayStation Store for the PlayStation 4 and PlayStation 5 on 15 August 2023.

== Gameplay ==
A screenshot of gameplay, showing the updated interface and remastered graphics

Gameplay is similar to that of the original game in which players control Sir Daniel Fortesque as he travels through Gallowmere to stop the evil Zarok. Dan can utilize a variety of weapons, including close range weapons such as swords and axes to long ranged weapons such as throwing knives and crossbows. If Dan defeats enough enemies to collect the Chalice of Souls hidden throughout each level, he will be able to travel to the Hall of Heroes, where a legendary hero rewards him by giving him a new weapon or other helpful items. Dan possesses a single life bar throughout the game, which can be sustained by collecting Life Bottles throughout the game which can be replenished by energy vials and Life Fountains. The remastered version also includes some exclusive arcade-style minigames which can also be played over online multiplayer.

MediEvil: Resurrection features many alterations to the original structure and content, such as the addition of the "Anubis Stone" sub-plot which has never appeared in the original. Various levels and characters designs are altered drastically from the original, with some levels removed altogether. Resurrection's altered plot is given a much more humorous and light-hearted setting as opposed to the Gothic horror-comedy of the first installment. Unlike the original, there is no alternate ending; Dan still ascends to the Hall of Heroes regardless of whether he collects all of the chalices or not.

== Plot ==
In the year 1286, an evil sorcerer named Zarok plotted to take over the kingdom of Gallowmere with his undead army. It is told in legend that the King of Gallowmere's champion, Sir Daniel Fortesque, led his army to victory and managed to kill Zarok before succumbing to his mortal wounds. In reality, Dan was in fact struck down by the first arrow fired in the battle, with the king choosing to cover it up and declare Dan the "Hero of Gallowmere". Zarok, meanwhile, was forced into hiding and was presumed dead. 100 years later, in 1386, Zarok reappears, casting a spell over Gallowmere to awake his undead army and steal the souls of the living. However, in the process, he unwittingly revives the corpse of Dan, who has over time become a skeletal corpse, missing his jaw and the eye he lost in the battle of Gallowmere. Shortly after waking up, Dan is accompanied by Al-Zalam, a genie whose powers were robbed by Zarok. Having been unable to ascend to the Hall of Heroes due to his failures in life, Dan uses this opportunity to defeat Zarok, save Gallowmere and earn his place as a true hero.

Dan journeys throughout the graveyard, mausoleum, harvest fields, forest, village, fair grounds, asylum, dockyards, marshland battlefields, Dragon Island and Peregrine Castle. Meeting Death himself, he advises Dan to find the four pieces of the Anubis Stone, a powerful necromancy artifact used by Zarok in his initial invasion, split into four pieces across the land. Dan retrieves the first piece from the tomb of an old chieftain, facing a Stained Glass Demon and the Graveyard Guardians (a pair of haunted wolf statues). Dan gets the second piece from the pumpkin witch after defeating her rogue magical pumpkin king. Looking for the second piece, Dan rescues the village mayor from an asylum's worth of monsters, as well as the particularly maddened "Mr. Axey"; the mayor tells him that the piece was hidden in the forest, where it is placed in the hold of the shadow demons; Dan retrieves the Demon Claw artifact before Zarok can find it and unleash the shadow demons within. In the forest, he collects mold for the forest witch for directions to the third piece, facing a pair of demonettes before locating the piece in the holding place of shadow demons, though Dan must defeat them when his retrieval of the Claw results in them being freed. In the marshlands of the battle against Zarok, Dan aids Death in repairing his robotic assistant and frees his boat as well. Death agrees to ferry him to Peregrine Castle, but the castle is blocked off by volcanic rivers. At Al-Zalam's suggestion, Dan disguises himself as a pirate to obtain a ship to journey to Dragon Island to retrieve a fireproof set of armor made of dragon scales. At the island, Dan defeats the Dragon guarding it, and Death ferrys him to Peregrine Castle. Dan recovers the final piece from the castle, where the ghost of the king tasks him with unleashing hidden floodgates connected to a dormant volcano beneath to destroy Zarok's forces. Dan makes his way onto the Ghost Ship, where he defeats the skeletal Ghost Pirate Captain before taking the ship to Zarok's lair.

Finally, after fighting his way through Zarok's hordes and confronting all manners of beasts, Dan soon arrives at Zarok's lair, fighting off Zarok's skeletal Fazgul warriors using the souls of his old allies retrieved by collecting the Chalices alongside the Anubis Stone. After also managing to defeat Zarok's champion and Dan's killer, Lord Kardok, Zarok turns into a powerful, monstrous serpent, but Dan manages to defeat him. As Zarok uses his magic to destroy his lair in an effort to kill Dan (getting himself killed in the process), Dan is rescued by Al-Zalam and the two escape, leaving Zarok's magical influence over the land thwarted. With the magic cast on him also wearing off as a result, Dan returns to his burial chamber where he once again enters eternal slumber and ascends to the Hall of Heroes, where he is hailed as the rightful Hero of Gallowmere and his hero statue is restored for redeeming himself.

== Development ==
Development of MediEvil: Resurrection began in 2003 at SCEE Cambridge Studio. The senior management team of Sony Computer Entertainment Europe wanted a launch game for the PlayStation Portable console and ordered the studio to develop the game in time for the console's release. Due to the short notice, the studio was given only a year to develop a game, thus it was decided that a remake of the original MediEvil would be suitable as developing an original title would take more time to develop.

It was strange to see something you loved being remade by others. I now know how directors feel when their movies are remade.

— Jason Wilson in an interview with Retro Gamer

Despite the success of the previous games in the MediEvil series, only three original team members were involved in the making of MediEvil: Resurrection. Chris Sorrell, the creator of MediEvil, stressed in a retrospective interview that he would have preferred to direct Resurrection if he was not at the time instructed to direct the video-game adaptation of 24. Since the release of Resurrection, Sorrell expressed disappointment with the changes made to the game and the fact that his superiors did not allow him to direct it, but praised the team's ability for working under a time constraint. Piers Jackson was instead appointed as the producer for Resurrection. He directed the overall development of the title, working closely with a new design team led by Dominic Cahalin. Mitch Phillips, who was the character animator for the previous two installments, was appointed as lead artist for the game. Phillips, along with Paul Arnold and Andrew Barnabas, the musical duo more commonly known as "Bob & Barn", who composed the original soundtrack for MediEvil, were the only people from the original team to return.

According to Piers Jackson, the thrust of the design was to produce a title that could showcase the full abilities of the PlayStation Portable, including its built-in Wi-Fi capabilities. Jackson also asserted that Resurrection was an entirely different game from the original; whilst the studio had taken the basic story and some of the locations from the original game, all the code, graphics and voice actors were changed. New additions to Resurrection included an expanded plot, added mini-games, multiplayer facilities and a cloud save function. During late stages of development, the studio attempted to preserve ideas that they thought worked well in the original, though their uses were altered or repositioned to keep the game fresh even to those who had played the original. The addition of the 'Anubis Stone' sub-plot was to strengthen the story arc and the creation of Al-Zalam was to act as Dan's internal monologue as well as the player's guide.

The game was released as a launch title for the PlayStation Portable in Europe and Australia on 1 September 2005, and in North America on 13 September.

=== Music ===
The soundtrack in Resurrection is orchestrated, unlike the first installment. Approximately half of the themes from the original were removed while new themes were created to fit with the new levels. The music is split into two halves; the cues from the first half are largely reminiscent of a select number of cues from the original game with the addition of extra thematic elements to strengthen them. The other half of the music is original and composed exclusively for Resurrection. The new soundtrack was composed by Bob & Barn and features performances from members of the City of Prague Philharmonic Orchestra that was recorded in the Czech Republic. The orchestra, headed by Nic Raine, consisted of approximately 80 performers and in addition benefits from a 32 piece choir, also recorded in the same venue. This follows the tradition of the studio's previous game Primal, whose orchestral soundtrack was also recorded in Prague by the same performers. The cues based on the original MediEvil were later recycled in the MediEvil remake released in 2019, with additional elements being added to the tracks.

== Reception ==
Reception

Aggregate scores
Aggregator	Score
GameRankings	69%
Metacritic	66/100

Review scores
Publication	Score
Eurogamer	4/10
GameSpot	6.1/10
GameSpy	3.5/5
IGN	7.3/10

MediEvil: Resurrection received mixed reviews upon release. It received an aggregate score of 69% from GameRankings and a score of 66 from Metacritic. General criticisms from reviewers were directed at the camera controls, which was cited as being particularly poor during combat sequences, and occasionally being the cause for frame rate drops. Jason Allen of IGN noted that the camera angles were "not as bad" during open areas of the game, but became "rather clumsy in the middle of a heated battle". Kristan Reed of Eurogamer expressed similar concerns with the camera work, stating that the camera was "sloppy" and that it proved particularly difficult during combat, when enemies were to suddenly appear off screen.

The combat was also criticized for its poor hit detection. Greg Mueller of GameSpot noted that the poor collision detection turned most of the combat sequences to a "frustrating and tedious" experience. Reed similarly criticized the combat system, citing that the system is "unremarkable on the basic level" and was disappointed with the lack of technical additions to the game. Allen also expressed concern with the fighting mechanics, stating that every melee attack was inaccurate and "clumsy", combined with cumbersome camera work.

The graphics and voice talent were the most praised aspects of the game, especially Tom Baker's role as the narrator and Grim Reaper. Mueller praised the soundtrack and dialogue, stating that the best part of the game "is easily the sound", and that the voice of any character fits their role "perfectly", making them more interesting than "the average voice-over". Reed also praised Baker's role in the game, stating that voice-overs and audio were the most enjoyable experiences in Resurrection, also citing that Baker's voice performance was "majestic" and "eccentric". Chris Scantleberry of GameSpy felt that the overall dialogue was heavy on the stereotypical accent, but was assured that players would enjoy the "electric atmosphere" of MediEvil, which he often compared to that of Tim Burton's The Nightmare Before Christmas.

Chris Sorrell and Jason Wilson, co-creators of MediEvil, had also expressed disappointment with the game. Neither of them had any involvement with MediEvil: Resurrection, and when they were asked about the game during a retrospective interview with Retro Gamer, Wilson felt disheartened with having to watch something he "cherished" to be altered with decisions he thought were "questionable". Sorrell felt similar disappointment in the redesign of the game and there were a number of aspects of it that he disagreed with. He did, however, praise the development team of Resurrection, stating that they did "an awesome job" considering the time constraints they were up against.
