= The History of Warfare (TV series) =

- Created by: Cromwell Productions Ltd
- Country of origin: United Kingdom
- Original language: English
- No. of episodes: 64

Production
- Producer: Bob Carruthers
- Running time: approx. 50 minutes

Original release
- Release: 1992 – 2001

The History of Warfare is a 3660-minute documentary series about the most famous wars and battles in world history focusing primarily on the military annals of Great Britain.

The series was created during the 1990s, when Cromwell Productions Ltd became a production company specialising in historical and arts documentaries taking the example of other shows from Cromwell such as Line of Fire and Battlefield.

== Presentation ==
The series dedicates numerous episodes to determine conflicts such as the English Civil Wars, the Napoleonic Wars, and the American Civil War. In addition to having segments such as Discovery To Revolution about the discovery and colonisation of the American continent by the Spanish, Dutch, French and English and Under Siege about the most famous battles of siege warfare.

The series has the participation as narrators of many British actors such as Robert Powell, Iain Cuthbertson and Brian Blessed. Bob Carruthers served as screenwriter and producer. The series included interviews with many military historians such as David G. Chandler then professor at the Sandhurst Military Academy.

== Episodes ==
N.	Title	Synopsis	Narrated by	Studio	Year	Released	DVD release date	Run time
1	The Greek And Persian Wars	This documentary focuses on the conflicts between the Greek city states and the Persian Empire in the fifth century BC, including the famous Greek victory at Marathon, and the Spartans' defence of the pass at Thermopylae, which ensured Greek freedom and victory. Features dramatised reconstructions and analysis by experts in the field of ancient history. This is the story of bloody conflicts between the Greeks and the Persians that lasted for more than fifty years in the fourth century BC. It includes the famous battle of Marathon, a victory that has echoed down the year, and Thermopylae, where the Spartans made a heroic defence of the pass. The running battles did not cease until 449 BC, when the Persians finally gave up hope of annexing Greece.	Brian Blessed	Cromwell	499 BC-449 BC		7 February 2005	50 min
2	Hoplite Warfare	The nature of infantry warfare in the Peloponnesian Wars between the Greek city states of Athens and Sparta in 450 BC. The hoplites were the regular infantry of both sides, armed with the long thrusting spear and fighting in powerful phalanxes, but it was the Spartans who used them to greater effect, eventually defeating Athens and subjugating her utterly. The mighty armoured warriors at the heart of Greek legend were famous Hoplites. Fighting shoulder to shoulder, armed with their long thrusting spears and colourful shields, these were the men who dominated the battlefields of the ancient world during the conflicts of the Peloponnesian Wars. In 450 BC, war erupted between the two great powers of ancient Greece, the Athenians and the Spartans. By the time the war had finished, the army, navy and city of Athens would be in ruins.	Brian Blessed	Cromwell	431 BC–404 BC		7 March 2005	50 min
3	Hannibal and the Punic Wars	A true giant of military history, Hannibal forged his formidable reputation during the Punic Wars of the second century BC. Famed for his incredible fifteen-day journey across the Alps, and for his great victories over the Romans at Trebbia and Cannae, Hannibal remained undefeated in battle until his raw armies were crushed by Scipio at Zama in 203 BC, leaving Carthage at the mercy of the hated Romans. It provides an atmospheric depiction of life in those troubled times. Superb reconstructions and re-enactments convey the savagery of battle in the ancient world. Expert comment and analysis and period imagery combine to tell the story of one of military history's greatest generals.	Bob Sessions	Pegasus	218 BC-201 BC		18 April 2005	55 min
4	Gallic Wars	The Gallic Wars tells the story of the campaigns from 58 BC to 53 BC in which Julius Caesar and his Roman legions conquered Gaul and the mysterious island of Britannia. Caesar portrayed this invasion as genuine concern for Italian security but as the campaign developed, Rome's greatest commander began to hatch plans for the full conquest. This documentary sketches the conflict between Rome and Gaul, specifically Caesar's campaigns of 58–53 BC, culminating with the defeat of Vercingetorix at Alesia. The programme uses clips of actors dressed as Gauls and Romans, one of whom poses as Julius Caesar reading extracts from his De bello Gallico, and these re-enactment scenes are interspersed with academic talking heads. It's all standard classroom stuff that gets the facts across without much in the way of frills or style, but doubtless of value for students. Much time at the beginning of the programme is spent looking at the Celtic way of life in an attempt to redress the bias of the written Roman sources, although the identification of Stonehenge as a druidic monument is highly contentious, as is the idea that Caesar's conquests were in some way retribution for the Gallic sack of Rome back in 390 BC: Caesar was far more interested in the current political scene to care about what was, for him as much as for us.	Bob Sessions	Cromwell	58 BC-50 BC		7 February 2005	55 min
5	The Roman Invasions of Britain	"Neither before or since has Britain ever been in a more disturbed or perilous state." CORNELIUS TACITUS. In 55 BC the ambitious Julius Caesar, Emperor of Rome, turned envious eyes towards the mysterious isle of Britain. Within a few short years, the mighty Roman war machine had tamed the Celtic tribal society and transformed it into a province of the Roman Empire. This is the story of the dark years of ancient Britain when the well-disciplined Roman Legions faced the fury of the united Celtic peoples of Britain.	Brian Blessed	Pegasus	43–96 AD		14 September 2004	55 min
6	Under Siege! Alesia 52BC	As resistance to the Roman invasion of Northern Europe collapsed, the Gallic warrior Vercingetorix marshalled 100,000 troops against the formidable and ruthless Roman legions, for what was to be a dramatic yet futile last stand at the famous hilltop fort of Alesia. The last of the fighting Gauls were up against one of military history's most inspired commanders – Julius Caesar and Roman legions of almost mythical invincibility. The extraordinary siege works constructed by the Romans not only kept Vercingetorix's army penned in but also managed to keep an enormous Gallic relief army out.	Jack Fortune	Pegasus	52 BC		19 April 2008	50 min
7	The Battle of Hastings-Tapestry of a Battle	I live and by God's help will conquer yet! William the conqueror, William the Conqueror¹s invasion of England. The great battle fought near the English seaside town of Hastings on 14 October 1066, was perhaps the most significant in England¹s history. The great victory won that day by Duke William of Normandy over Harold II of England was to shape forever the destiny of a nation. For at the end of a day of furious battle, the sun set not only on the dead and wounded who littered Senlac Hill, but also on the entire Anglo-Saxon way of life. The Battle of Hastings features atmospheric original reconstruction and re-enactment footage, plus dramatised eye-witness accounts. The very latest 3D computer mapping techniques combine with delightful images from the remarkable Bayeux Tapestry to tell the dramatic story of a battle which remains one of the most famous in military history. Narrated by Michael Leighton. Featuring expert comment and analysis by Dr David Chandler, the world's foremost military historian and former head of War Studies at Sandhurst.	Michael Leighton	Cromwell	1066		13 September 2004	55 min
8	Norman Conquests-The Harrying of the North	This documentary tells the story of the years following the Battle of Hastings, a brutal period in which Norman king William the Conqueror ruthlessly wiped out all Anglo-Saxon resistance in the north of England. Also included are reconstructions and re-enactments, with Matthew Strickland of examining the impact of Norman rule on Anglo-Saxon society, from the introduction of feudalism to the building of Norman churches.	Hu Pyrce	Cromwell	1066–72		7 February 2005	55 min
9	Viking Wars – The Norse Terror	The Danes had possession of the place of slaughter... ...and rode wherever they pleased THE ANGLO-SAXON CHRONICLE. During the long years of the Dark Ages, the sight which signalled fear and terror for the inhabitants of coastal Britain was the first glimpse of an unfamiliar sail on the horizon. The sighting of the famous long ships heralded the arrival of Viking raiders; the harbingers of death and destruction. The wolves of Odin were about to be unleashed again. 'The Norse Raiders', provides a glimpse into the extraordinary world of a remarkable people. Featuring dramatised eye-witness accounts filmed on the holy island of Lindesfarne, the video and powerful reconstructions of Dark Age warfare. Combined with state-of-the-art computer graphics and surviving period imagery, The Norse Raiders is a superb record of a savage period in British history.	Brian Blessed	Pegasus	793–1066		16 August 2004	55 min
10	The Crusades	"If I am not worthy to regain Jerusalem, I am not worthy to look upon it." King Richard I. The story of the Crusades. For nearly two centuries, generations of knights from England and Western Europe marched to do battle with the Saracen hordes who occupied the Holy Land. Bitter and bloody, these great battles are known to history as the Crusades. Perhaps most famous of all was Richard the Lionheart¹s struggle with the Emperor Saladin on the burning sands of Palestine in 1190. The Crusades Knights of Christ features atmospheric reconstruction footage and spectacular computer effects to tell the dramatic story of the great conflict between Christianity and Islam. The programme also features dramatised eye-witness accounts and expert comment and analysis.	Michael Leighton	Pegasus	1095–1291		13 April 2004	55 min
11	The Battle of Stirling Bridge	This documentary chronicles the victory of the Scottish rebels over the English at Stirling Bridge on 11 September 1297. William Wallace led the Scots in their short but historic stand, which saw the English expelled from Scotland – much to the chagrin of Edward I. The Battle of Stirling Bridge tells the dramatic story of the great Scottish triumph over the English on 11 September 1297. Their momentous victory confirmed the reputation of William Wallace and made him a national hero. His name has loomed large in the pages of Scottish history ever since. After the short but brutal battle, the English were driven from the land, leaving Edward I swearing a terrible revenge. Battle reconstruction, location footage and expert analysis from leading military histories combine to create an atmosphere and action-packed account of this famous battle in British history.	Michael Leighton	Cromwell	1297		7 February 2005	55 min
12	William Wallace – The True Story	During his short life, William Wallace never faltered in his struggle against English oppression. It was Wallace who, at the head of a small band of men, burnt Lanark and killed its sheriff. It was he who was the architect of the great victory at Stirling Bridge, and it was he who wrought havoc in the North of England. Featuring stunning battle re-enactments and specially filmed reconstructions, this DVD is a powerful telling of the story of a Scottish giant. The influence of the mighty warrior can still be felt today, captured in the heard of the proud Scottish people. The life of William Wallace was basis for the blockbuster film Braveheart, directed by and starring Mel Gibson. This documentary features battle reconstruction footage to analyse the story of William Wallace, the famous Scottish general who planned the Battle of Stirling Bridge and wrought havoc in the North of England in protest at King Edward's invasion of Scotland.	Jock Ferguson	Cromwell	1270-23- 1305		16 May 2005	45 min
13	The Battle of Bannockburn	"On them! On them! They fail! They fail! Scots cry at Bannockburn, The stirring tale of a nation's fight for freedom." In a mighty attempt to crush the Scots, King Edward II placed himself at the head of the invasion of Scotland. In their desperate hour of need came Scotland¹s greatest medieval king, Robert, known simply as The Bruce. The two forces would meet at a small stream within sight of Stirling Castle – the Bannockburn. The thunderous battle fought there would decide the fate of a nation. Featuring atmospheric reconstruction and re-enactment footage, The Bruce of Bannockburn features superb depictions of the savagery of medieval battle. The ebb and flow of a crucial day in British history is illustrated by the very latest 3D graphic mapping techniques combined with dramatised eye-witness accounts of the battle. With extensive original footage filmed in and around Stirling Castle itself, the programme provides a unique record of the most celebrated victory in Scotland¹s history. Narrated by Iain Cuthbertson. Featuring expert comment and analysis by Dr David Chandler, the world¹s most foremost military historian and former head of War Studies at Sandhurst.	Iain Cuthbertson	Pegasus	1314		13 September 2004	55 min
14	The Peasant's Revolt 1381	Part of the 'History of Warfare' series, this documentary looks at the events surrounding the momentous Peasants' Revolt of 1381, when the English peasantry protested against crippling taxes and poverty. Fired up by the charismatic Wat Tyler and John Ball, the peasant army reached the gates of London, only to see the promises made by Richard II broken and their cause betrayed. Featuring battle re-enactments, dramatised 'eye witness' accounts, and expert analysis of the causes and consequences of the revolt. Narrated by Michael Leighton.	Michael Leighton	Pegasus	1381		19 September 2005	55 min
15	Wars of the Roses – Blood, Treachery And Cold Steel	King Richard alone was killed fighting manfully in the thickest press of his enemies. Fifteenth-century England saw the turmoil of a bloody struggle for power between the House of York and the House of Lancaster, known to history as the Wars of the Roses. It would culminate in a ferocious encounter on Bosworth Field in 1485, a battle which saw the death of King Richard III. With Henry VII's victory, so the Tudor dynasty was born. This DVD features spectacular battle reconstructions, dramatised re-enactments and superb computer effects to provide a memorable account of the famous Wars of the Roses. Expert comment and analysis comes from Dr David Chandler, who provides detailed insight into the clashes between the White Rose of York and the Red Rose of Lancaster.	Brian Blessed	Pegasus	1455–87	1994	7 February 2005	55 min
16	The Battle of Flodden	September 1513 saw King James IV invade England with the largest and most confident army Scotland has yet seen. But within a few short days, nearly 10,000 of these proud warriors would be lying dead on Flodden Field. Among the hacked corpses would be the body of King James himself. This is the story of the most catastrophic military defeat in Scotland's history. For a turquoise ring and a foolish promise, James IV had risked, and lost, everything. This DVD includes dramatic and authentic battle re-enactments and the very latest in computer graphics to help tell this chapter in the bloody story of the conflicts between England and Scotland.	Terry Molloy	Pegasus	1513		18 April 2005	60 min
17	The Armada 1588	The story of the Spanish Armada of 1588 is a gripping account of one of the greatest naval battles in maritime history. Infuriated by continued English support for the revolt against Spanish rule in the Netherlands and by the recent raid on the harbour of Cadiz by Sir Francis Drake, Phillip II, then at the height of his military power, built a huge Armada for the express purpose of seizing control of the English Channel and launching an invasion of Britain. It would prove to be a humiliating disaster, ruined and defeated by a combination of brilliant British seamanship and the appalling weather that the English Channel is justly famous for, detailing the famous drubbing received by Philip II of Spain's Armada at the hands of Sir Francis Drake. Historians such as John Tincey offer their insights into the battle, which was won through a culmination of fine seamanship by Drake and appalling weather in the English Channel. Also included are modern-day reconstructions and footage of the Golden Hinde and the Mary Rose museum.	John Nolan	Cromwell	1588		7 February 2005	55 min
18	The English Civil Wars	It was a time of bitterness and hatred, a war which pitched father against son, brother against brother in the bloody battle for the soul of the nation. It was winner takes all. After seven years of turmoil, even the dramatic execution of King Charles I could not bring peace, more bloodshed still lay ahead. The most tragic and dramatic chapter in English history is recorded in this spectacular and entertaining documentary. It features superb battle re-enactments and reconstructions, dramatised eyewitness accounts and delightful period imagery to chronicle the events, the major personalities and the battles of the war.	Robert Powell	Pegasus	1642–51	1992	18 April 2005	80 min
19	The English Civil War – A People Divided	It was a time of great bitterness and hatred in Britain a war that set father against son and brother against brother. The breakdown in relations between a Parliament with a strong purpose and a King who believed in his divine right to rule set the scene for a series of brutal battles that were truly a struggle for the soul of a nation. The outcome of the English Civil War shaped the course of the nation's history and laid the foundations of the country as it is today. The first episode of 'The English Civil War' takes an in-depth look at the years between King Charles' accession to the throne and the opening conflict of the war in 1642 the Battle of Edgehill. The programme delves into the complex web of political, social, religious and military issues that were the root causes of the war.	Robert Whelan	Pegasus	1629–40		13 July 2009	50 min
20	The English Civil War – A Nation at War	It was a time of great bitterness and hatred in Britain a war that set father against son and brother against brother. The breakdown in relations between a Parliament with a strong purpose and a King who believed in his divine right to rule set the scene for a series of brutal battles that were truly a struggle for the soul of a nation. The outcome of the English Civil War shaped the course of the nation's history and laid the foundations of the country as it is today. The second episode of 'The English Civil War' unravels the story of the early and middle phases of the conflict a period that saw fortunes fluctuate and opportunities come and go at the battles and sieges of Gloucester, Bristol, Newbury, and Marston Moor.	Robert Whelan	Pegasus	1642–51		18 April 2005	50 min
21	The English Civil War – To Kill A King	It was a time of great bitterness and hatred in Britain a war that set father against son and brother against brother. The breakdown in relations between a Parliament with a strong purpose and a King who believed in his divine right to rule set the scene for a series of brutal battles that were truly a struggle for the soul of a nation. The outcome of the English Civil War shaped the course of the nation's history and laid the foundations of the country as it is today. The third instalment of The English Civil War series recounts the events that eventually led to the King's execution. This episode sees how the King's cause was dealt a fatal blow by the calamitous defeat of his force sat the Battle of Naseby in 1645.	Robert Whelan	Pegasus	1649		13 July 2009	50 min
22	The Battle of Edgehill	This documentary examines the crucial opening battle of the English Civil War, the engagement between parliamentary and royalist forces at Edgehill on 23 October 1642. Features battle reconstruction footage and re-enactments, with analysis by historical experts.	Michael Leighton	Cromwell	1642		21 March 2005	50 min
23	Under Siege! Newark 1643–46	The story of the battles for the strategically vital town in Nottinghamshire is a classic example of how a siege was conducted during the long and bitter fighting of the English Civil War. The town was the gateway to the north of England and was the site of three separate sieges, as the armies of the King and of Parliament fought for control. In February 1643 the Royalists beat back the determined Parliamentarian attacks but the town then had to be relieved by the dashing Prince Rupert a year later. Finally, in May 1646, Newark surrendered to Parliamentary forces on the explicit orders of King Charles I, who in doing so sealed his own fate and condemned himself to the block.	Jack Fortune	Pegasus	1643–46		19 April 2008	50 min
24	The Battle of Marston Moor – The Scots March South	The Battle of Marston Moor on 2 July 1644, was one of the most important of the entire English Civil War. It was here that a force of some 27,000 Parliamentarian and Scottish troops routed an army of just 18,000 Royalists. Crucially, the Royalist stronghold of York was lost and King Charles's cause in the north virtually collapsed. It was a defeat from which the King would never recover. Featuring spectacular battle reconstruction footage and dramatised eye-witness accounts, this episode tells the powerful story of one of English history's greatest military engagements.	Terry Molloy	Pegasus	1644		18 April 2005	55 min
25	The Battle of Naseby – Fairfax Triumphant	This documentary examines the crucial battle of Naseby on 14 June 1645, in the English Civil War. In this deciding battle, Cromwell's New Model Army finally vanquished the hopes of King Charles. Features battle reconstruction footage and re-enactments.	Ian Brooker	Cromwell	1645		21 March 2005	55 min
26	The Shadow of The Scaffold	It was a time of great bitterness and hatred in Britain a war that set father against son and brother against brother. The breakdown in relations between a Parliament with a strong purpose and a King who believed in his divine right to rule set the scene for a series of brutal battles that were truly a struggle for the soul of a nation. The outcome of the English Civil War shaped the course of the nation's history and laid the foundations of the country as it is today. This video examines the slaughters at Drogheda and Wexford, the defeat of the Scottish army at Worcester, the role of Cromwell as Lord Protector and England as a commonwealth, and the restoration of the monarchy after Cromwell's death.	Robert Whelan	Cromwell	1649–60		13 July 2009	50 min
27	The Jacobites	This documentary uses battle reconstruction footage to examine the history of the Jacobite movement, the campaign to restore a Stuart monarch to the throne of Great Britain, which ended in defeat at the Battle of Culloden in 1746. Features dramatised 'eye witness' accounts as well as expert comment and analysis.	Michael Elder	Cromwell	1688–1746		16 May 2005	60 min
28	Culloden 1746 – The Last Highland Charge	The moor was covered in blood and our men looked like so many butchers rather than Christian soldiers. A British soldier. The dramatic story of the last charge of the Highland Clans. On a barren Scottish moor in April 1746, the tired and hungry men of the last Highland army made their final desperate charge against a well-disciplined British force led by the Duke of Cumberland. Despite their incredible courage and valour, the result was a foregone conclusion the clan warriors met a terrible end. It was to be the defeat and ruin of the Jacobite cause... forever. This is the moving story of the last great battle to be fought on British soil. Culloden Moor features spectacular, accurate battle reconstructions and re-enactments, plus moving footage shot on Culloden Moor as it is today. The programme¹s dramatised eye-witness accounts, period imagery and computer-generated maps combine perfectly to provide a superb and accurate account of a crucial day in British history. Featuring expert comment and analysis by Dr David Chandler, the world¹s most foremost military historian and former head of War Studies at Sandhurst.	Brian Blessed	Pegasus	1746	1993	16 August 2004	55 min
29	Scotland Forever	This documentary uses battle reconstruction footage to examine the history of the Scottish soldier. From the wars against England and the battles at Bannockburn and Flodden Field, to the conflicts undertaken as part of the British army in the wars against Revolutionary France and then against Germany in the twentieth century, the Scottish soldier has commanded respect from friend and foe alike.	Iain Cuthbertson	Cromwell	12–16th Centuries		16 May 2005	50 min
30	Discovery and the Spanish Presence And The French Frontier	This DVD features two episodes from the entertaining and educational series 'America: Discovery To Revolution' and examines the birth of the most powerful nation on Earth. 'Discovery And The Spanish Presence & The French Frontier' tells the story of the early Spanish conquistadors and their insatiable pursuit of fame and fortune in the New World. Chasing stories of cities made of gold and the fabled fountain of youth, many Spanish adventurers lost their lives and took the lives of countless natives in their hunt for treasure. Witnessing the success of their rivals, the French decided that they too would claim a piece of this new territory and set about establishing themselves as a force to feared and respected.	Brian Blessed	Pegasus	16th century		20 April 2009	50 min
31	The Pilgrim Frontier And The Dutch Frontier	Featuring two episodes from the entertaining and educational series 'America: Discovery To Revolution' and examines the birth of the most powerful nation on Earth. 'The Pilgrim Frontier & The Dutch Frontier' looks at the plight of the early settlers and the huge part religious beliefs, or lack thereof, played in the first formative years of this great nation. With religious persecution rife across Europe, many saw the New World as a fresh start – a place to exercise their personal philosophies free from prejudice. Far from finding Utopia, the New World offered up some cruel realities for the newcomers including hostile natives, harsh terrain and competing settlers from other nations.	Brian Blessed	Pegasus	16th century		20 April 2009	50 min
32	The French And Indian War	This documentary examines the conflicts between the French and the British in North America during the eighteenth century, with particular focus on the engagements featuring the Native American warriors used by both sides. By the end of the fighting, Quebec and Canada were in British hands, and North America became part of the British Empire. Features battle reconstruction footage, re-enactments, and expert comment and analysis by Dr Scott Lucas and historian Stuart Reid.	Ian Brooker	Cromwell	1754–63		21 March 2005	55 min
33	The English Frontier And The American Revolution	Featuring two episodes from the entertaining and educational series 'America: Discovery To Revolution' and examines the birth of the most powerful nation on Earth. 'The English Frontier & The American Revolution' examines the fractious relationship between the governing British rulers and the colonials who were demanding independence. The Stamp Act of 1765 was the first direct tax on the colonies and the flashpoint which lead to the American War of Independence, as many believed there should be 'no taxation without representation'. Victory saw an end to British rule but it also signalled the start of a bloody chapter in American history.	Brian Blessed	Pegasus	16–18th century		20 April 2009	50 min
34	New Orleans 1815	This military documentary looks at the calamitous Battle of New Orleans, where the British were defeated by a well-enforced American army. By preventing America from annexing Canada, the British ultimately won victory in the War of 1812, but their attempts to take control of the Mississippi valley led to 2,000 casualties at New Orleans and a decisive defeat in that part of the campaign. Featuring battle re-enactments and period images, as well as expert analysis of the causes and consequences of the fighting.	Bob Sessions	Cromwell	1815		19 September 2005	50 min
35	The Napoleonic Wars	This documentary gives an overview of the Napoleonic period, following the man who would be Emperor from his humble beginnings to his legendary victory at Austerlitz. With reconstructions, period imagery and expert analysis, it goes on to examine the disaster of the Russian campaign and the final defeat at Waterloo in 1815. Narrated by Mike Leighton.	Michael Leighton	Pegasus	1803–15		7 February 2005	50 min
36	Napoleon – Early Years	From his birth in the Corsican capital of Ajaccio in August 1769, Napoleon Bonaparte seems to have been earmarked for greatness. There was little during his early years to suggest as much, however, for he came from an ordinary if well-to-do family and had a difficult schooling in France. But joining the military was the making of him, and he soon discovered a remarkable gift for impressing influential people. This episode covers the all-important early years of Napoleon's life up to his capture of Toulon in 1793 and the infamous 'whiff of grapeshot', when he fired upon and killed over 200 rebellious French citizens to protect the Government.	Robert Whelan	Pegasus	1769–95	2001	9 June 2009	50 min
37	Napoleon – Early Campaigns	Marriage to Josephine de Beauharnais did little to quell Napoleon's vaulting ambition. Now he had the opportunity to display his burgeoning military talents, which he showed to full effect during his stunning first Italian campaign. It saw Napoleon win the respect of his officers and gain the love of his men merely by ensuring that, for the first time in years, they were paid properly. After his triumphant return to Paris in 1797, Napoleon was already planning his invasion of Europe. This episode covers all these events plus the invasion of Egypt and the battle of the Pyramids, ending with Napoleon's rise to First Consul in 1799.	Robert Whelan	Pegasus	1796–99	2001	9 June 2009	50 min
38	Napoleon – Imperial Zenith	By the year 1800, Napoleon's political career was in full swing but as First Consul he was hardly a man of the people by a stroke of outrageous good fortune he even survived an assassination attempt on Christmas Eve 1800. This gave him the perfect excuse to eliminate several political enemies and tighten his grip on a tumultuous nation. This episode covers Napoleon's golden era; his rise to Emperor in 1804 and his remarkable military victories at Austerlitz, Eylau and Ulm. By 1808 the Emperor of France was just a short step away from becoming the Emperor of Europe.	Robert Whelan	Pegasus	1800–08	2001	1 June 2009	50 min
39	Austerlitz 1805 – Napoleon's Greatest Triumph	"Let us put an end to this campaign with a crash of thunder that will stun the enemy." The Emperor Napoleon. A superb record of the Emperor Napoleon's greatest triumph. As the famous sun of Austerlitz rose through the pale mist on the morning of 2 December 1805, the stage was set for one of the most decisive battles of the Napoleonic era. By evening, the combined armies of Austria and Russia would be utterly destroyed. It was to be Napoleon¹s greatest victory, achieved by a commander at the very peak of his powers. This stunning DVD features dramatised reconstructions and eye-witness accounts, plus Russian archive film footage from Bondarchuck's masterpiece War and Peace. With 3D graphic mapping techniques and delightful period imagery, The Battle of Austerlitz is a memorable account of a bloody battle which had a profound effect on the course of European history. Featuring expert comment and analysis by Dr David Chandler, the world's foremost military historian and author of 'The Campaigns of Napoleon'.	Brian Blessed	Pegasus	1805	1993	16 August 2004	55 min
40	Battle of Trafalgar – Nelson's Victory	Draws extensively on I remember Nelson and HMS Defiant, two of the most accurate reconstructions of the age of sail ever filmed, Also featuring dramatised re-enacted accounts shot aboard Nelson's flagship HMS Victory. The programme includes special 3D graphic images and superb contemporary images to tell the story of a momentous day in naval history. Featuring reconstructions, period imagery and 3D graphic images, this programme tells the story of a momentous day in naval history – Nelson's victory at the Battle of Trafalgar.	Robert Powell	Cromwell	1805		16 August 2004	55 min
41	Napoleon – Spanish Ulcer	Up until 1807, Napoleon's life and career had been an almost uninterrupted tale of success, but things were beginning to unravel. The Emperor's determination to impose the 'Continental System' on the whole of Europe was the driving force behind the decision to invade Spain and Portugal, known to posterity as the Peninsular War. A further headache presented itself in the form of a revitalised and remodelled Austrian army, a force that was to inflict Napoleon's first decisive defeat on the battlefield. Family matters both home and abroad were also starting to cause Napoleon some problems, as his fortunes slowly began to wane.	Robert Whelan	Pegasus	1812	2001	1 June 2009	50 min
42	Under Siege! – Ciudad Rodrigo 1812	The bloody Peninsular War lasting from 1807 to 1814 saw the commanders of Britain consistently defeating the best French generals Napoleon's army had to offer in a series of famous pitched battles. Ciudad Rodrigo, however, was a different type of fight – siege warfare, where civilians and soldiers shared the same conditions, privations and fate. This is the story of how great and lesser breaches in the walls of the city were made and how it was eventually captured. It features some of the most famous episodes and characters of the war including the fearsome 'Black Bob' Craufurd.	Jack Fortune	Pegasus	1812		19 April 2008	50 min
43	Napoleon 1812 – The Road To Moscow	This documentary looks at the events surrounding Napoleon's ill-judged invasion of Russia in 1812. Entering the country with the largest invasion force the world had yet seen – some 650,000 men – Napoleon defeated the Russian army in key encounters such as the Battle of Borodino. But as the French progressed further into the vast Russian interior, it was to be the weather, not force of arms, that defeated them. After taking Moscow, Napoleon was forced into a brutal and ignominious retreat that saw tens of thousands of his men perish in the freezing Russian winter. Featuring period imagery, dramatised 'eye witness' accounts, expert comment and analysis, and extracts from the Russian film of 'War and Peace'.	Robert Powell	Cromwell	1812		16 August 2005	60 min
44	The Battle of Borodino	This documentary examines the crucial battle of Borodino in 1812, where Napoleon paid a high price for his invasion of Russia, an invasion that was ultimately to end in bloody retreat.	Robert Whelan	Cromwell	1812		19 March 2005	50 min
45	Napoleon – Winter in Russia	With the Peninsular War still raging, Napoleon made a fateful decision in 1812 when he turned his attentions east and the Grand Army began an invasion of Russia. Nothing could have prepared them for what lay ahead as they marched slowly towards Moscow. Little did they know that of the half a million men who crossed the Russian border, fewer than fifty thousand would ever see their homeland again. This episode tells the story of Napoleon's greatest mistake his ill-fated Russian adventure that spelt the beginning of the end for the Emperor. The episode includes the story of the bloody Battle of Borodino and the appalling horrors of the French retreat from Moscow.	Robert Whelan	Pegasus	1812	2001	1 June 2009	50 min
46	The Battle of Waterloo 1815	On 18 June 1815, the last battle of the Napoleonic era was fought. On the field of Waterloo the myth of Napoleon's invincibility was finally laid to rest. This film uses modern re-enactments, period paintings and advanced 3-D mapping techniques to produce a powerful record of these dramatic moments in history.	Robert Powell	Pegasus	1815	1992	19 March 2005	55 min
47	Napoleon – Waterloo Final Curtain	This is the final chapter of Napoleon Bonaparte's extraordinary life. A chapter that begins with his enforced exile on the island of Elba. He busied himself building forts and bridges, winning the support of the local population and making plans for a return to France. When he did return, it was to an ecstatic welcome from his former troops and it was not long before he was reinstated as Emperor and at war once again. But there was to be no glorious ending to the tale. Instead it ended in spectacular and bloody failure in June 1815 on the famous battlefield of Waterloo. Napoleon's old enemy the Duke of Wellington once again beat his forces and this time there was no way back. Napoleon died in exile on St. Helena just six years later, but the legend of his military genius had only just begun.	Robert Whelan	Pegasus	1815	2001	1 June 2009	50 min
48	Balaclava 1854 – The Charge of the Light Brigade	The infamous charge of the Light Brigade and the heroic courage of the Thin Red Line. The story of the Battle of Balaclava. It was one of the most famous battles in military history. The Battle of Balaclava was distinguished by three celebrated acts the heroic courage of The Thin Red Line, the dashing bravery of the Heavy Brigade and, of course the utter disaster which befell the Light Brigade as it made it¹s infamous charge. It was a day during which the key players in the drama had a vital bearing on the outcome the uncertain Raglan, the feuding Lucan and Cardigan, the excitable Captain Nolan. Featuring special dramatised eye-witness¹ accounts and reconstructions, period imagery and 3D mapping techniques, this video is a dramatic record of the notorious Charge of the Light Brigade. The programme also features extensive footage from the Tony Richardson masterpiece The Charge of the Light Brigade to illustrate the ebb and flow of the fighting during a truly momentous day in the history of warfare. Featuring expert comment and analysis by Dr David Chandler, the world's foremost military historian and former Head of War Studies at Sandhurst.	Brian Blessed	Pegasus	1854		18 April 2005	55 min
49	India – The Struggle For Independence/The Spanish Conquest of Mexico	'India – The Struggle For Independence' looks at the history of Mughal and British control of the sub-continent, including the violent 1857 Indian mutiny. 'The Spanish Conquest of Mexico' looks at the story of Spain's Hernando Cortez, the 16th century conquistador who demolished the Aztec empire and took Mexico for Spain. Includes period imagery and location footage.	Michael Leighton	Pegasus	1857/1521		19 September 2005	60 min
50	The American Civil War	It was the most tragic episode in American history. During four years of bitter and bloody fighting between the states, more than 600,000 troops from the Union and Confederate sides lost their lives. The bloody events at places such as Antietam, Gettysburg, Shiloh, Cold Harbor, Vicksburg and Fredericksburg are still burned deep into the American psyche, never to be forgotten. From the first shots at Fort Sumter to the emotional Confederate surrender at Appomattox Courthouse, this programme tells the story of the conflict which scarred the soul of a nation. It features superb battle reconstructions and depictions of army life, dramatised eye-witness accounts, period photographs and images, plus expert comment and analysis.	Robert Powell	Pegasus	1861–65		16 August 2004	55 min
51	The Confederates	Part of the 'History of Warfare' series, this documentary examines the history of the Confederate Army during the American Civil War, focusing in particular on General Robert E. Lee's Northern Virginia army, which came so close to defeating the Federal Army. Featuring large-scale battle reconstructions, as well as dramatised 'eye witness' accounts and expert analysis.	Bob Sessions and Billy J. Mitchell	Cromwell	1861–65		19 September 2005	55 min
52	The Battle of Brandy Station 1863	This military documentary looks at the epic cavalry battle that took place at Brandy Station in 1863, on the eve of the momentous Battle of Gettysburg. Up until that point, the Confederate cavalry had been seen as invincible, but when the two forces of some 18,000 horsemen met in combat, the Yankees proved more than a match for their adversaries. Featuring large-scale battle re-enactments and recreations, as well as dramatised 'eye witness' accounts and expert analysis.	Bob Sessions	Cromwell	1863		19 September 2005	50 min
53	The Battle of Gettysburg	The story of what happened after Brandy station, the largest cavalry battle ever fought on American soil, its result was : Gettysburg was the turning point of the American Civil War and is, perhaps, the most famous battle of that bloody and bitter conflict. However, only weeks before, the cavalry forces of North and South had met in what would prove to be the largest cavalry engagement of the war, the Battle of Brandy Station. This is the dramatic story of that crucial battle, a fight which would dispel the myth of the invincible Confederate cavalry forever. This DVD features a magnificent reconstruction of the Battle of Brandy Station specially filmed in Virginia, the largest cavalry re-enactment ever staged in America. Also featuring superb dramatised eye-witness accounts, computer generated 3D mapping techniques plus delightful period imagery and photographs; this programme provides an unforgettable record of a vital day in the American Civil War. Featuring expert comment and analysis by Dr David Chandler, the world's foremost military historian and former Head of War Studies at Sandhurst.	Bob Sessions	Pegasus	1863		13 September 2004	55 min
54	Under Siege! – Petersburg 1864	Fought during the American Civil War, Petersburg should never have been 'under siege' at all. Union forces should have seized control of the town in June 1864, but, through a mixture of confusion and incompetence, they failed in their objective, and a yearlong siege followed. Petersburg is best remembered for the tragedy of the great crater, the result of a huge underground explosion in July 1864, into which the Union Army inexplicably charged, creating a ready-made killing zone. This unusual tactic was an extreme answer to solving the problem of siege warfare.	Jack Fortune	Pegasus	1864		19 April 2008	50 min
55	The Franco-Prussian War 1870–71	]This military documentary looks at the devastating Franco-Prussian war of 1870–71, the first modern conflict to be fought on European soil. Characterised by the inept performance of the French army under Napoleon III, and by the ruthless efficiency and professionalism of the Prussian forces, the final stages of the war saw Paris itself under siege, and France collapsing into civil war. Featuring battle re-enactments as well as expert analysis of the causes and consequences of the fighting.	Bob Sessions	Cromwell	1870–71		19 September 2005	45 min
56	The Battle of The Little Big Horn 1876 – Custer's Last Stand	This documentary combines contemporary images and photographs alongside modern reconstructions to examine the famous battle of the Little Big Horn, where General George Armstrong Custer made his last stand. Custer was making a last-bid attempt to restore his flagging reputation, but the conflict was an ill-conceived one, which saw the Indian tribes triumph totally over their white oppressors.	Michael Leighton	Cromwell	1876		19 September 2005	55 min
57	The Zulu Wars 1879	"Fix bayonets and die like British soldiers do!" ORDER TO BRITISH TROOPS AT Isandlwana. An authoritative account of the Zulu War of 1879. The Redcoat campaign in Zululand in 1879 holds a special place in the pantheon of military history. Its two most famous battles – the dreadful slaughter at Isandlwana and the heroic defence of Rorke¹s Drift still hold an enduring fascination. These epic encounters are laced with tales of courage and valour on both sides. The incredible determination of the Zulu warriors and the sheer professionalism and bravery of the British soldiers ensures that the Zulu Wars maintain their place in the popular imagination. Featuring footage from the movie Zulu Dawn this video is a spectacular true record of the war against the Zulus. Exciting specially filmed reconstructions and re-enactments, plus dramatised eye-witness accounts combine with the very latest 3D mapping techniques and superb period imagery to tell the epic story of the momentous chapter in military history. Narrated by . Featuring expert comment and analysis by Dr David Chandler, the world's foremost military historian and former head of War Studies at Sandhurst.	Robert Powell	Pegasus	1879		16 August 2004	55 min
58	Rorke's Drift 1879 – Against All Odds	The story of history's most famous rearguard action, The story of the extraordinary events of 22 January 1879, has never lost any of its fascination. The defence of Rorke's Drift by a handful of British redcoat soldiers provides history with a tale of incredible courage and valour, qualities displayed by the brave men of both sides who fought to the death on that momentous day. While Britain cheered its heroes, she also plotted a merciless revenge on the Zulu nation. Featuring extensive re-enactment action footage and dramatised eye-witness accounts of the battle, this DVD tells the story of the British soldiers who successfully defended Rorke's Drift against more than 4000 Zulu warriors. It also includes period images and photographs, computer graphics and expert comment from Ian Knight, one of the world's leading authorities on the Zulu Wars.	Hu Pryce	Pegasus	1879	1994	7 February 2005	55 min
59	The Boer War And Other Colonial Adventures	The story of Britain at her Imperial zenith. During the long reign of Queen Victoria, Britain's armies marched to the farthest reaches of the globe to win an empire for their queen and country. Africa was a vital source of trade and materials for the rapidly expanding industrial Britain and so the famous redcoat armies fought through the endless jungles, swamps and deserts of the vast continent. Through these harsh conditions, soldiers campaigned on expeditions from the Asanti and Zulu Wars to the Boer War. This DVD uses accurate feature film footage and original dramatised reconstructions and re-enactments to tell the story of Britain at the height of her imperial ambitions. This highly atmospheric programme also features state of the art computer mapping techniques and delightful surviving period imagery. Featuring expert comment and analysis by Dr David Chandler, the world's foremost military historian and former Head of War Studies at Sandhurst.	Brian Blessed	Pegasus	1879	1994	13 September 2004	55 min
60	Under Siege! – Verdun 1916	This was the hellish, protracted siege known to many as 'The Mincer'. The fanatical French defence of the three forts – which had enormous psychological value to the whole nation – cost hundreds of thousands of lives and was, in part, the reason the Battle of the Somme was fought during the same year. The battle ebbed and flowed throughout the year and the forts were captured and recaptured many times before finally the fighting eased in December 1916. Unfortunately by this time almost 700,000 French and German troops had been killed or wounded trying to take or defend the city.	Jack fortune	Pegasus	1916		19 April 2008	50 min
61	Kaiserschlacht 1918	This military documentary looks at the last great German offensive of the First World War, the so-called 'Kaiserschlacht', or 'Emperor's Battle'. Dubbed 'Operation Michael', this 1918 offensive saw the German Army amass 6,000 artillery pieces and a million troops to launch a devastating blow on the unsuspecting British and French lines. Yet, after some of the bloodiest fighting of the entire war, and despite impressive initial German gains, the 'Kaiserschlacht' was doomed to failure as the Germans ran out of men and equipment. After having broken the offensive and three years of stalemate, the Allies were able to finally defeat the German Army in the field. Features archive footage, expert analysis and period imagery.	Michael Leighton	Cromwell	1918		19 September 2005	50 min
62	The Spanish Civil War	This is the story of the war that changed the course of Spanish history. The struggle between the supporters and opponents of the Spanish Second Republic raged between 1936 and 1939, between the fascist nationalists and the anarquists, communists and liberal democrats. A testing ground for the ideologies that were to convulse Europe and the world in the Second World War, the Spanish Civil War saw interference from Nazi Germany, fascist Italy and the Soviet Union. During the war, new names were written large in world history; names such as the International Brigade and the Nationalist General Franco, who led his side to ultimate victory. Featuring fascinating archive film and location footage, plus dramatised "eyewitness" accounts, providing an intriguing account of a dark and divided period of Spanish history. This program also features photographs and interviews with surviving members of the International Brigade. Expert interpretation and analysis provides historical and political background to the war. Features interviews with surviving members of the International Brigade, as well as expert interpretation and analysis.	Michael Leighton	Cromwell	1936–39	1995	14 July 2009	55 min
63	Under Siege! – Leningrad 1941	The siege was the longest and most enduring of World War Two if not the entire twentieth century. What was initially a planned attack to take the city in four weeks turned into a nine-hundred-day siege of immense proportions. Since before Leningrad was called such she was called Saint Petersburg and in her long history had never been invaded, despite this Hitler announced that it was to be the first great Soviet city to fall and city was to be wiped off the face of the earth. In 1941 the decision was taken Leningrad was a symbolic with Operation Barbarossa have three main objectives with army group south taking the industrial might of the Soviet Union heading to the oil fields of the Cacausses, army group Centre heading for the country's capital and political headquarters Moscow and Army group north with its orders to take the historical symbol of Bolshevism Leningrad because it was here in 1917 that the October Revolution was proclaimed. Hitler said that it was a war of ideology taking Leningrad will deprave the Russian people of the symbol to their revolution. The German planned to take quickly the city so the same troops could be used the same troop to conquer Moscow. Leningrad will become Hitler's grave because it was proved that the fight for the city was a fight for pure survival and that Leningraders were not afraid of death but that death was affair of Leningrad. Life, honour, happiness, everything was at stake in this mortal challenge. With stiff resistance containing and troops needed elsewhere, the Panzer battalions disengaged and went south to Moscow, leaving the long-range artillery. The battle of Leningrad had effectively become a siege. Surrounded on all sides, there was not an effective way to get supplies into the city, Goebbels saying that Leningrad is doomed to die of famine. The entire population was put on the ration of a few loaves of black bread per day, with many of some parts of the population turning to cannibalism. Health problems from the survivors many died later as a result. The 'Road of Life', a frozen lake that in January 1942 saw a passage through which vital supplies could be smuggled into the encircled city. Spring saw a pipeline to bring oil to the city under siege. The Soviet offensive in late 1943 saw 200,000 men make a pincer movement which by January 1944 was able lift the siege so that the city was no longer an island. The Siege of Leningrad had taken the lives of over 1 million of its citizens either from air attacks, artillery bombardments, starvation and disease; the population stood firm until the only Germans who entered the city were prisoners of war, being the only German soldiers to serve in a single army group during the entire war. The siege was lifted, but it would take another year to completely defeat the German army, and with the lifting of the siege certain came down the iron certain with the return of Soviet oppression, seeing many heroes of Leningrad killed after the war because they were seen as potential enemies.	Jack Fortune	Pegasus	1941		17 April 2008	50 min
64	Agincourt	A French army of 30,000 men surveyed the small English force. The French expected victory, but as a day of great savagery unfolded, it was the English, led by King Henry V, who would destroy their enemy.	Brian Blessed	Cromwell	1415	1993		50 mins

== Trivia ==
- Brian Blessed is narrator for the episode about the War of the Roses, which is also a coincidence because he is also the narrator for the video game War of the Roses.
- History of Warfare is another link to the long chain in the partnership by Brian Blessed and Bob Carruthers, having worked together on several other projects such as Dinosaurs: Myths and Realities and Chasing the Deer.
- Iain Cuthbertson is Scottish and narrator for all the Scottish episodes.
- Screenwrither and Producer Bob Carruthers is also Scottish.
- Bob Carruthers was also producer and screenwriter for the Line of Fire and Battlefield TV series.
- The series has been translated into over four languages such as Spanish, French, German and Russian.
