= Bob Carruthers =

Scottish filmmaker, author and broadcaster (born 1960)

Bob Carruthers (born November 1960) is a Scottish historian, filmmaker, author and broadcaster.

== Career ==
Born in Kirkcaldy, Fife, Carruthers attended Kirkcaldy High School. After graduating from Edinburgh University in 1981 and working for Central Television (now ITV Central) Carruthers founded the documentary production company Cromwell Productions Ltd, based in Stratford-upon-Avon.

During the 1990s, Cromwell Productions Ltd became a production company specialising in historical and arts documentaries. Carruthers was the writer and producer behind Music Maestro, Campaigns In History, The History of Warfare (TV series), Line of Fire, Weapons of War, The English Civil War (2002 TV series), History of Warfare Series and Battlefield Series IV and V. He received an Emmy Award after being nominated by Disney Channel for writing and producing Dinosaurs: Myths and Reality which was voiced by Brian Blessed. Following this partnership with Blessed, the pair worked on numerous documentaries and eventually on three feature films. An early example of the arts was the interview program Tony Iommi: The Guitar That Drives Black Sabbath in 1992 about Tony Iommi

The film Chasing the Deer was produced in 1994 and starred Brian Blessed. Based on the Battle of Culloden, it was the third highest grossing British feature film of that year. Chasing the Deer was followed by The Bruce starring Oliver Reed, another Scottish historical epic which was released to cinemas in 1996. Macbeth starring Jason Connery and Helen Baxendale won the US Silver Screen Award.

Away from the mainstream cinema Carruthers also made low-budget films, producing and directing Steel Tempest, Zombie Driftwood and Wraith Rovers as examples of what can be achieved on tiny budgets.

== Music ==
In 2000, Carruthers founded Classic Rock Productions Ltd which produced hundreds of music documentaries and CD releases. The company also toured and promoted the rock groups Uriah Heep, Asia and Focus. Documentaries and concert films produced in this period include Jethro Tull, Wishbone Ash and Jack Bruce. He was also the executive producer on albums by British progressive group Mostly Autumn, including the critically acclaimed Passengers, an album which saw the band headlining at the London Astoria.

== Other interests ==
In 2006, Carruthers became owner of Edinburgh Rugby, the professional rugby team based in Edinburgh which was acquired from the Scottish Rugby Union. The most significant result on the field was Edinburgh’s first ever victory over Munster Rugby at Thomond Park. The DVD and book entitled The Hard Yards describes the events on the field. The off field events are recounted in the book The Murrayfield Experience.

Since 2011 Carruthers has concentrated mainly on his writing career. His works have been published by such mainstream houses such as Cassell, Carlton Books and Pen and Sword Books.

In 2015 Anglo Atlantic Media Limited, of whom Carruthers was formerly a director, unlawfully trademarked the name of the Bonzo Dog Doo Dah Band. The attempted trademark was finally cancelled on 9 April 2020, after Carruthers lost a case against the band members, both surviving and dead.
