= Chasing the Deer =

- Chasing the Deer theatrical poster
- Directed by: Graham Holloway
- Written by: Bob Carruthers; Steve Gillham
- Produced by: Bob Carruthers
- Starring: Brian Blessed; Lewis Rae; Iain Cuthbertson; Matthew Zajac; Fish
- Cinematography: Alan M. Trow
- Edited by: Patrick Moore
- Music by: Runrig, Fish, John Wetton.
- Production companies: Cromwell Productions & Lamancha Productions
- Release date: 16 September 1994 (Scotland)
- Running time: 97 minutes
- Country: United Kingdom
- Language: English

Chasing the Deer (later re-titled Culloden 1746) is a 1994 British war film directed by Graham Holloway and starring Brian Blessed, Lewis Rae, Iain Cuthbertson, Fish and Mathew Zajac. It depicts the 1745 Jacobite Rebellion, in which Bonnie Prince Charlie landed in Scotland, trying to claim the British throne.

The title metaphorically alludes to the Jacobites as the quarry in a deer hunt. The phrase "a-chasing the deer" appears in the refrain of the romantic Scottish poem by Robert Burns, My Heart's in the Highlands (1789).

== Plot ==
In the time leading up to Jacobite rising of 1745, a young Highlander called Euan (Lewis Rae) and his father Alistair are press-ganged into the Jacobite army to fight for the Young Pretender, Bonnie Prince Charlie.

Euan's group of warriors are captured by Hanoverian loyalist troops and he is forced to join the Duke of Cumberland's army as a drummer for the British. Major Elliot (Brian Blessed), a Hanoverian officer who has lost his own son, forms a protective relationship with Euan. Father and son end up fighting on opposing sides at the Battle of Culloden (1746). Euan is killed, and Alistair runs to his aid. Seeing a Jacobite soldier standing over the body of his favourite soldier, Major Elliot kills Alistair.

== Production ==
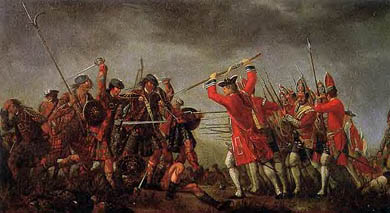
The film depicts events leading up to the Battle of Culloden in 1746

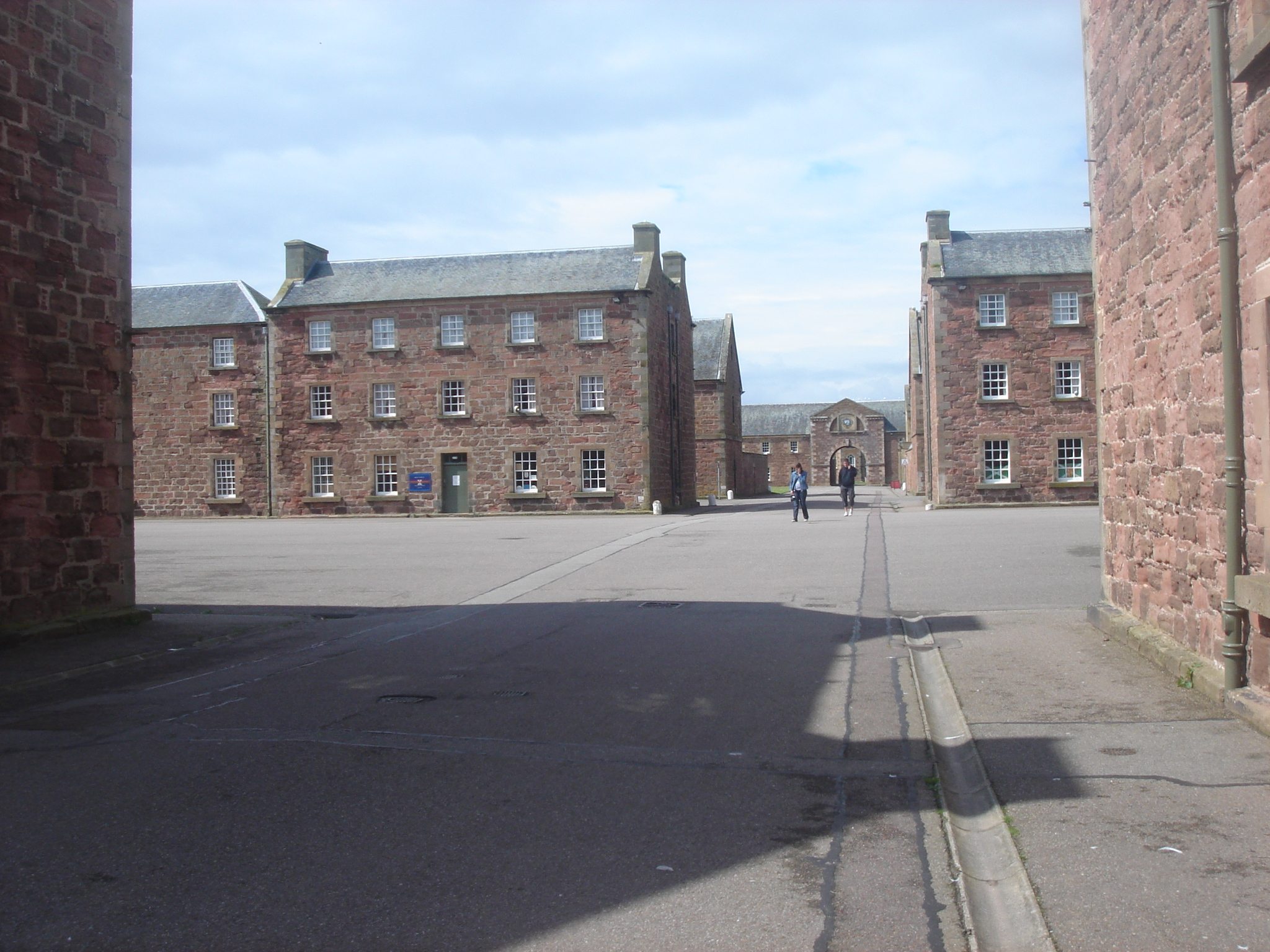
Fort George was used as a filming location

The budget for Chasing the Deer was limited, and in order to raise money for the production, the filmmakers crowdfunded the film by inviting individuals to invest £1000 each in the project. In return for their contributions, the 374 investors were allowed to appear in the film as extras.

For the battle scenes, notably the depiction of the Battle of Culloden, the filmmakers engaged a Scottish Historical group, The Clan Wallace, to perform historical combat. The group also performed in other Scottish historical films such as The Bruce (1996) Highlander (1985) and Braveheart (1995).

Chasing The Deer was filmed on location in Scotland, including Culloden, Fort George, Kingussie, Ruthven Barracks, and the Cairngorm mountains. Some internal sequences were filmed in England at Hagley Hall in Worcestershire, and battle scenes at the nearby Wychbury Hill.

== Music ==
The film soundtrack was scored by English rock musician John Wetton includes music by the Scottish celtic rock group Runrig and the ex-Marillion singer-songwriter Fish, and features Wetton's song "Battle Lines".

== Cast ==
- Brian Blessed as Major Elliot
- Iain Cuthbertson as Tullibardine
- Matthew Zajac (as Mathew Zajac) as Alistair Campbell
- Fish as Angus Cameron
- Brian Donald as Old Campbell
- Sandy Welch as Old Cameron
- Peter Gordon as McKinnon
- Carolyn Konrad as Morag
- Lynn Ferguson as Shonagh
- Lewis Rae as Euan
- Simon Kirk as Sgt. Kirk
- Andy McCullogh as Sgt. Monroe
- Callum McDougal as a Crofter
- Steven Cooper as a Crofter
- Michael Leighton as O'Sullivan
- Dominique Carrara as Charles Edward Stuart
- Robert McIntosh as McDonald of Sleat
- Jacqueline Pirie as Mary
- Jock Ferguson as Lord George Murray (general)
- Kim Durham as Sir John Cope

== Reception ==
Murray Pittock's critical assessment of Chasing the Deer considered that Holloway's production was influenced by Peter Watkins's 1964 film Culloden in its portrayal of the conflict as a clash between haphazard, tribal Jacobite warriors and the forces of modernity. However, Time Out contrasted Chasing the Deer unfavourably with Watkins's film for its small cast and over-reliance on a smoke machine, but singled out Brian Blessed's performance for praise. Writing in the Glasgow Herald, William Russel found the script and acting style clumsy and the cinematography unimaginative and restricted. However, he also praised Brian Blessed's portrayal of Major Elliot, the choreography of the battle scenes and the choice of "stunningly beautiful" Highland locations. Empire awarded the film two stars out of five, citing the low-budget production values and the use of "Tourist Board footage of lush countryside and antlered animals in order to fill gaping holes in the plot." Chasing the Deer has been credited with helping to raise cultural awareness of the historical events at Culloden.

The film opened on 9 screens in Scotland on 16 September 1994 and grossed £17,062 in its opening weekend.
