= Endell =

Endell is a surname. Notable people with the surname include:

- August Endell (1871–1925), German designer, writer, teacher and German Jugendstil architect

== See also ==
- Charles Endell Esquire, British comedy-drama
- Endell Street, Street in London's West End
- Endell Street Military Hospital, First World War military hospital located on Endell Street in Covent Garden, London
