= David G. Chandler =

British historian

David Chandler
- Born: 15 January 1934
- Died: 10 October 2004 (aged 70)

Academic work
- Main interests: Military history, especially the Napoleonic Wars
- Notable works: The Campaigns of Napoleon and other books on the Napoleonic era

David Geoffrey Chandler (15 January 1934 – 10 October 2004) was a British historian whose study focused on the Napoleonic era.

As a young man he served briefly in the army, reaching the rank of captain, and in later life he taught at the Royal Military Academy Sandhurst. Oxford University awarded him the D. Litt. in 1991. He held three visiting professorships: at Ohio State in 1970, at the Virginia Military Institute in 1988, and Marine Corps University in 1991.

According to his obituary in The Daily Telegraph, his "comprehensive account of Napoleon's battles" (The Campaigns of Napoleon) is "unlikely to be improved upon, despite a legion of rivals."

General de Gaulle wrote to Chandler in French declaring that he had, "surpassed every other writer about the Emperor's military career."

He was also the author of a military biography of John Churchill, 1st Duke of Marlborough, and of The Art of Warfare in the Age of Marlborough, and contributed a number of articles on Napoleonic warfare to History Today magazine. He also appeared in documentaries, including several in The History of Warfare and Line of Fire series.

== Awards ==
- 1979 Gold Cross of Merit of Poland
- 1939–1960 British National Service

== Works ==
- 1966 – The Campaigns of Napoleon. New York: Macmillan. ISBN 978-0297748304.
- 1973 – Napoleon. London, Weidenfeld & Nicolson. ISBN 978-0297765691. reprinted 2000, Barnsley, Pen & Sword ISBN 978-0850527506.
- 1979 – Dictionary of the Napoleonic Wars. New York: Macmillan. ISBN 978-0025236707.
- 1979 – Marlborough as Military Commander. London: Batsford. ISBN 978-0713420753.
- 1980 – Atlas of Military Strategy: The Art, Theory and Practice of War, 1618–1878. London: Arms & Armour. ISBN 978-0853681342.
- 1981 – Waterloo: The Hundred Days. Oxford: Osprey. ISBN 978-0540011704.
- 1987 – Napoleon's Marshals (ed.). New York: Macmillan. ISBN 978-0029059302.
- 1987 – The Military Maxims of Napoleon (ed.). London: Greenhill. ISBN 978-1853675126.
- 1987 – The Dictionary of Battles (ed.). London: Ebury Press. ISBN 978-0852236871.
- 1989 – Battles and Battlescenes of World War Two. New York: Macmillan. ISBN 978-0028971759.
- 1990 – The Illustrated Napoleon. London: Greenhill. ISBN 978-1853670862.
- 1990 – Austerlitz, 1805: Battle of the Three Emperors (Osprey Military Campaign). London: Osprey. ISBN 978-0850459579.
- 1990 – The Art of Warfare in the Age of Marlborough. Staplehurst, UK: Spellmount. ISBN 978-0946771424.
- 1993 – Jena 1806: Napoleon destroys Prussia Osprey Publishing. ISBN 978-1855322851.
- 1994 – On the Napoleonic Wars. London: Greenhill. ISBN 978-1853671586.
- 1994 – The Oxford Illustrated History of the British Army. (ed.). Oxford: University Press. ISBN 978-0198691785.
- 1994 – The D-Day Encyclopedia. (ed with James Lawton Collins Jr.). Upper Saddle River, NJ: Helicon ISBN 978-0132036214.

== See also ==
- Napoleon legacy and memory
- Jean Tulard
- Fondation Napoléon
