= Budgie (TV series) =

1971 British comedy-drama TV series

- Iain Cuthbertson (left) and Adam Faith in Budgie
- Created by: Keith Waterhouse; Willis Hall
- Starring: Adam Faith; Iain Cuthbertson; Lynn Dalby
- Country of origin: United Kingdom
- Original language: English
- No. of series: 2
- No. of episodes: 26

Production
- Running time: 50 minutes
- Production company: London Weekend

Original release
- Network: ITV
- Release: 9 April 1971 – 14 July 1972

Related
- Charles Endell Esquire

Budgie is a British television series starring pop star Adam Faith produced by ITV company London Weekend Television and broadcast on the ITV network between 1971 and 1972.

The series was created by Keith Waterhouse and Willis Hall. The show was produced by Verity Lambert with Rex Firkin as Executive Producer. In an interview for the 2006 DVD release, Lambert stated that the series was originally going to be called The Loser but this was rejected by the TV Network. The show had two theme songs: the first was "The Loner" by The Milton Hunter Orchestra, and the second was "Nobody's Fool" written by Ray Davies and performed by Cold Turkey.

== Series plot ==
The series consisted of a sequence of stories – sometimes spread across two episodes – depicting Budgie's involvement in some hare-brained scheme to make money, usually somewhere on the wrong side of legality, and invariably for the local boss, Mr Endell. He often failed in his aim, being continually the victim of circumstance or of the sharper, more experienced underworld operators he tried to emulate.

The opening credits showed Budgie trying to grab large numbers of banknotes blowing in the wind.

Plots included:

- Trying to unload thousands of stolen ballpoint pens he has unwisely bought from one fence, paying too much in the process. He finds that the pens are all stamped with a logo, possibly "Her Majesty's Government", making them unsellable. Apparently these were the classic "trading commodity", the only object being to sell them to another sucker. Charlie offers to take them off Budgie's hands for next to nothing in exchange for a favour or two, and promptly unloads them to another villain.
- Arranging a pornographic film show in a hotel and having assured the "punters" that the film was "the real Laurel and Hardy, if you know what I mean", making his escape before they find out the film really is a Laurel and Hardy movie.
- Accidentally stealing a vanload of pornographic magazines from the police, and then having to destroy the evidence. The wind blows the pages from the bonfire Budgie and his pal have made and they blow all over a field where a prison wardens-versus-prisoners cricket match is imminently to be played.

=== Series One ===
The story begins with Ronald Bird (nicknamed "Budgie") being released from an open prison and trying to find a living in whatever way possible. He meets Charlie Endell in a bar with a 15-year-old stripper (Adrienne Posta) and Endell asks Budgie to look after her for a week. Budgie asks his part-time actress girlfriend Hazel Fletcher (Lynn Dalby) to help.

In the one-hour pilot he accidentally steals the wrong Ford Transit but this is beneficial as it is a police-owned van full of confiscated pornography heading for destruction. Budgie reckons he can sell it, however Mr Endell insists that he burns it all. The wind catches the paper and the pornography blows off the bonfire just as a busload of cricket players arrive. Budgie comes away with a fruit machine from the cricket club which he takes to Hazel's flat.

They drive off but his assistant Grogan says he is going off with Charity (the stripper). Budgie is left to explain this to Mr Endell.

Eventually all his supposed friends desert him; he ends up back in court for handling stolen goods: a fruit machine stolen from a cricket club and featured in the storyline of the first episode. In reality, Charlie Endell has shopped him for this. Ironically one of Budgie's lesser crimes, he is found guilty... not helped by poor advice from his lawyer.

=== Series Two ===
Series two begins with Budgie in an "open nick": Fern Open Prison. Fellow prisoners include Wossname Walsh (James Bolam). Budgie has three weeks left until release. He has had few visitors until Mr Endell comes, but only is there to retrieve £3,000 from another prisoner, Dutchy Holland (Bill Dean). Budgie will get a 10% cut if he can retrieve this. When Budgie is released two cars are waiting: his ex-wife and Charlie. He must choose.

On release (episode two of series 2) he stays with his wife for a few days. He encounters a street preacher (Gordon Jackson) who leads "The Brothers of Happiness". A chance meeting with his ex-girlfriend Hazel, who is now living with someone else, and Budgie finding out that his wife has been sleeping with a friend of Budgie's, from the same open prison, force Budgie to move back in with his girlfriend and his son Howard, who is now two years old. Budgie carried on much as he did in the first series, which also started with him being released from the same open prison from a previous sentence. The second series ended with him being beaten up by both his boss and one of his henchmen. This, combined with the fact that Budgie's mother has recently died, his father not wanting him, his girlfriend becoming pregnant by Budgie, and that he wants to leave Hazel for a stripper he has recently slept with who then tells him that she is moving abroad, makes Budgie even more depressed and eventually makes him head off into a new life. This is where the series ended.

== Cast ==
The title role, a chirpy cockney petty criminal newly out of prison, was played by pop singer Adam Faith; it was his first starring role for television. The character's name was Ronald 'Budgie' Bird, nicknamed after the budgerigar birds sometimes kept as pets in England.

The series co-starred Iain Cuthbertson as Charles (Charlie) Endell, a suave and Machiavellian Glaswegian gangster based in London, who employed Budgie, often against his own better judgement, or when he was in need of an unsuspecting scapegoat. June Lewis played his silent wife Mrs Endell. During the late 1970s, Scottish Television produced a short-lived spin-off series, Charles Endell Esquire.

The only other regular member of the cast was Lynn Dalby as Budgie's girlfriend, Hazel Fletcher. Stella Tanner had a semi-regular role as her mother, Mrs Fletcher. Rio Fanning appeared three times as Budgie's gullible criminal Irish pal, Grogan. Guest stars included Georgina Hale as Budgie's wife Jean, George Tovey as his father, Jack Bird, and Adrienne Posta as a stripper and Nicholas Smith as a Detective. John Rhys-Davies had an early semi-regular role as a corpulent gangster working for Endell, with the name of Laughing Spam Fritter.

Budgie's dad Jack Bird is played by George Tovey and his mum Alice by Julia McCarthy. His sister Violet (Vi) is played by Anne Carroll. Vi's fiancée/husband Tony Pringle is played by Donald Douglas. The neighbour Mrs L. is Barbara New. Charlie Endell's mousey wife is played by June Lewis.

Series two broadened the characters to include Endell's secretary, Mrs Beecham (Nan Munro) and Budgie's wife (Georgina Hale). Avril Elgar played Mrs Silverstone, a rich woman being fleeced by a fake religious movement led by "Soapy Simon" (Gordon Jackson).

Derek Jacobi played Hazel's cousin Herbert in one episode where Budgie introduces him to the sordid side of London's Soho district. Kenneth Cranham was the main support as Inky Ballantine in the episode "24000 Ballpoint Pens", with Alfie Bass in the same episode as the ironically named fence, Dickie Silver.

Budgie's "bit on the side", Inga Loveborg, was played by Margaret Nolan.

The series also featured performances from other well known British actors including Anthony Valentine, Peter Sallis, Jack Woolgar and Jack Smethurst.

== Production ==
Two series, each of 13 episodes, were made. Although colour equipment had been introduced two years earlier, the first four episodes were made in monochrome because of industrial action.

A further series may have been planned for 1973, although this coincided with Adam Faith being seriously injured in a car crash, and announcing his retirement from acting as a result. Despite a full recovery by Faith and his eventual return to acting, a further series was never commissioned. The television channel Talking Pictures TV began a repeat of the entire series from 13 April 2024.

== Musical version ==
A musical based on the characters of the series, but featuring only Adam Faith from the original TV cast, opened at the Cambridge Theatre in London on 18 October 1988, where it ran for three months until 21 January 1989. Directed by Jonathan Lynn, the book was by Keith Waterhouse and Willis Hall, and it had music by Mort Shuman, lyrics by Don Black and also starred Anita Dobson and John Turner.
