= Lynn Dalby =

English actress (1947–2025)

- Born: Lynn Margaret Dalby; 17 February 1947; Harrogate, West Riding of Yorkshire, England
- Died: 22 October 2025 (aged 78); London, England
- Occupation: Actress
- Years active: 1964–2001
- Television: Always Greener; All Saints; Water Rats
- Height: 1.63 m (5 ft 4 in)
- Spouse: Ray Lonnen (m. 1977; div. 1983)
- Children: 1

Lynn Margaret Dalby (17 February 1947 – 22 October 2025) was an English actress.

== Early life and career ==
Lynn Margaret Dalby was born in Harrogate, West Riding of Yorkshire, England on 17 February 1947. She trained at the Corona Theatre School with future Emmerdale co-star Frazer Hines.

Her first television appearance in 1964 was in Crossroads as a secretary called Rita Hughes. In 1969 she took part in the television comedy series, again playing under the name Rita, called The Gnomes of Dulwich alongside actors Hugh Lloyd and Terry Scott.

In 1970 she appeared in the episode "Busmen's Perks" of the television comedy series On the Buses as Janet (the manager's secretary).

In 1971 she became popular as Budgie's (played by actor Adam Faith) girlfriend Hazel Fletcher in the weekly TV series Budgie, where she became one of the regular characters. Between 1971 and 1972, 26 episodes of the series were made.

She played Ruth Merrick Sugden in the soap opera Emmerdale Farm in 1972.

Dalby acted in the 1975 horror film Legend of the Werewolf where she played the part of Christine. She played Marie De La Garde alongside Ian Ogilvy in an episode of the TV series Return of the Saint called "The Diplomat's Daughter" aired on 11 March 1979. Also in 1979, she played Jo Hathaway in the Francis Durbridge television series called "Breakaway The Local Affair".

In 1980 she starred in the television crime drama Breakaway, playing the part of Jo Hathaway, written by Francis Durbridge.

Dalby made several appearances on television, from the 1980s up until 2001. She emigrated to Australia in 1987 to take part in several Australian television series including Sons and Daughters, Water Rats, All Saints and Always Greener.

== Personal life and death ==
Dalby married Ray Lonnen in 1977, with whom she had one child. They divorced in 1983.

She emigrated to Australia to continue her career in acting and retired there. Dalby died in London, England on 22 October 2025, at the age of 78.
