= William Houston (actor) =

British actor

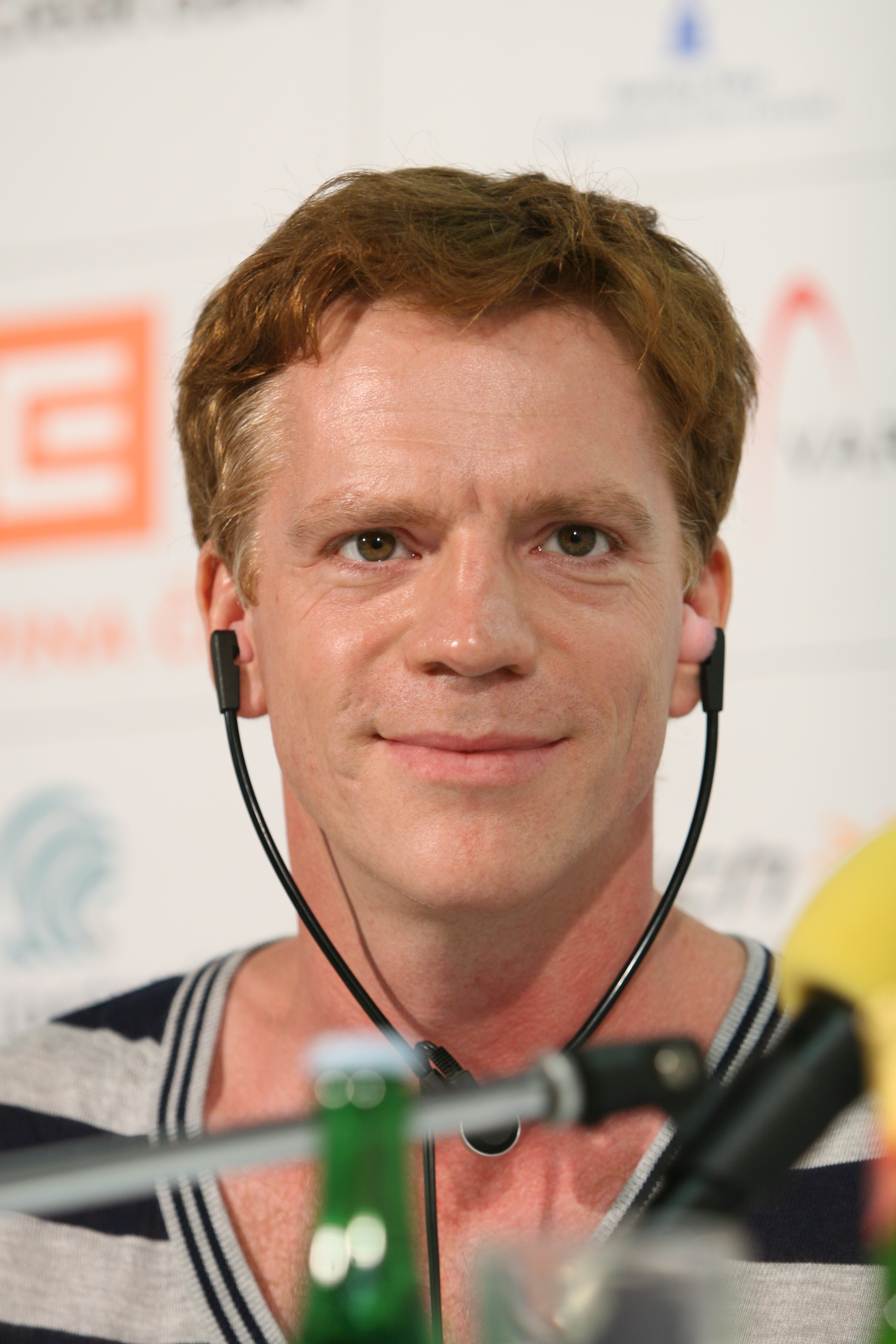
- William Houston at 2008 Karlovy Vary International Film Festival
- Born: July 19, 1968 (age 58); Sussex, England, United Kingdom
- Education: Royal Central School of Speech and Drama
- Occupation: Actor
- Years active: 1994–present

William Houston, sometimes credited as Will Houston, is an English actor.

== Early life and career ==
Born in Sussex, he grew up in Northern Ireland.

Trained at the Central School of Speech and Drama, Houston has played many leading classical stage roles.

These have included: Troilus in Troilus and Cressida, Prince Hal in both parts of Henry IV and the title roles in Henry V (for which he was nominated for an Evening Standard Theatre Award for Best Actor), Ben Jonson's Sejanus, and Coriolanus, all for the Royal Shakespeare Company; Pentheus/Agave in Sir Peter Hall's production of Euripides' Bacchai at the National Theatre. He replaced Iain Glen in the lead role in Fortune's Fool at the Old Vic from January 2014.

Between May and July 2014 he played Titus in Shakespeare's Titus Andronicus directed by Lucy Bailey at Shakespeare's Globe Theatre.

In April 2009, he appeared in "Cause and Effect", the second episode of the third series of Robin Hood. He also played the character of Boucher in the BBC's adaptation of Elizabeth Gaskell's 'North and South' with Daniela Denby-Ashe and Richard Armitage. He appears in the BBC series of Casualty 1909 and 1907, as Dr. Millias Culpin.

He played Constable 'Clarky' Clarke in the 2009 film Sherlock Holmes alongside Robert Downey, Jr. and Jude Law, directed by Guy Ritchie (credited as William Houston), and reprised the role in the 2011 sequel Sherlock Holmes: A Game of Shadows. He worked with From Software to voice cast as Marvellous Chester in the DLC for 2011's Dark Souls, King Vendrick in 2014's Dark Souls II and its rerelease Scholar of the First Sin. He also voiced NPCs Retired Hunter Djura and the Gatekeeper in Bloodborne in 2015, and the optional boss enemy Oceiros, the Consumed King in Dark Souls III in 2016.

In 2020, he played Ted Daszkiewicz in the BBC drama The Salisbury Poisonings.

Houston appeared as Ser Robyn Rhysling in HBO's A Knight of the Seven Kingdoms in 2026.

== Filmography ==
=== Film and television ===
- The Odyssey (1997, TV Series) – Anticlus
- The Gambler (1997) – Pasha
- Hamlet (2003) – Prince Hamlet
- North and South (2004) – Boucher
- Puffball (2007) – Tucker
- Elizabeth: The Golden Age (2007) – Don Guerau De Spes
- Casualty 1907 (2007) – Dr Milais Culpin
- Fifty Dead Men Walking (2008) – Ray
- Sherlock Holmes (2009) – Constable Clark
- Casualty 1909 (2009) – Dr Milais Culpin
- Robin Hood (2009) – Finn MacMurrough
- Clash of the Titans (2010) – Ammon
- Age of Heroes (2011) – Mac
- Sherlock Holmes: A Game of Shadows (2011) – Constable Clark
- Lord of Darkness (2012) – Charlie McGuire
- The Bible (2013) – Moses
- Endeavour - Richard Broom
- Son of God (2014) – Moses
- Dracula Untold (2014) – Cazan
- Shakespeare's Globe: Titus Andronicus (2015) – Titus Andronicus
- The Dancer (2016) – Rud
- Level Up (2016) – The Businessman
- Brimstone (2016) – Eli
- Will (2017, TV series) – William Kempe
- The Salisbury Poisonings (2020, TV series) – Ted Daszkiewicz
- The Last Duel (2021 film) – Herald at the Duel
- Amphibia (2022, TV series) – King Aldrich, The Core (voice)
- Wednesday (2022, TV series) – Joseph Crackstone
- The Gorge (2025) – Erikas
- A Knight of the Seven Kingdoms (2026) – Ser Robyn Rhysling (3 episodes)

=== Video Games ===
- Dark Souls: Artorias of the Abyss (2012) – Marvelous Chester (voice)
- Dark Souls II: The Lost Crowns (2014) – Vendrick (voice)
- Bloodborne (2015) – Retired Hunter Djura (voice), Gate Keeper (voice)
- Dark Souls III (2016) – Oceiros, the Consumed King (voice)
- Horizon Zero Dawn (2017) – Blameless Marad (voice), Brin (voice)
- Horizon Forbidden West (2022) – Blameless Marad (voice)
- Horizon Call of the Mountain (2023) – Blameless Marad (voice)
