= Hamlet (2003 film) =

2003 film of the play Hamlet

- Directed by: Mike Mundell
- Based on: Hamlet by Shakespeare
- Produced by: Lara Lowe
- Starring: William Houston; Gareth Thomas; Christopher Timothy; Paul Curran; Iain Cuthbertson; Lucy Cockram; Jilly Bond
- Edited by: Julian Overall
- Music by: Paul Farrer
- Production companies: Cromwell Films; Lamancha Productions
- Distributed by: Edgehill
- Release date: 2003
- Running time: 115 minutes
- Country: United Kingdom
- Language: English

Hamlet is a British drama film of 2003 starring William Houston in the title role, with Gareth Thomas, Christopher Timothy, Iain Cuthbertson, Paul Curran, Lucy Cockram, and Jilly Bond.

== Production ==
This adaptation keeps the Shakespearean dialogue, while leaving much out to shorten the overall length. It presents the action in a 17th-century setting, with costumes and props hired from the Royal Shakespeare Company.

In 1997, Houston had been understudy to Alex Jennings when he played the part of Hamlet in a RSC production of the play.

The film was released on DVD in 2013.

== Cast ==
- William Houston as Prince Hamlet
- Gareth Thomas as King Claudius
- Iain Cuthbertson as Ghost
- Christopher Timothy as Gravedigger
- Richard Brimblecombe as Rosencrantz
- Richard Hansell as Guildenstern
- Lucy Cockram as Ophelia
- Jilly Bond as Gertrude
- Paul Curran as Laertes
- David Powell-Davies as Polonius
- Bryan Harrison as Murderer
- Jason Harris as Horatio
- Alistair Wilson as Osric
- Guy Adams as Soldier
- Mark Griffin as Servant
- Harriet Caruthers as Wedding Guest
- David Eldridge as Wedding Guest
- Sofia Price as Wedding Guest
- John Corvin as First Player
- Nikolas Hall as Soldier
- Roger Green as Play Guest
- Jane Dean as Play Guest
- David Dean as Play Guest

== Reception ==
Small-Screen Shakespeare says of Houston that he offers "a dangerous, unbalanced-looking Hamlet". Of Iain Cuthbertson's Ghost, it notes that Cuthbertson may indeed be playing the part, but "the weird photography makes it impossible to tell".
