= Don McKillop =

English actor (1928–2005)

- Born: Donald Harley McKillop; 15 February 1928; Carlisle, Cumberland, England
- Died: 19 December 2005 (aged 77); Spain
- Occupation: Actor
- Years active: 1961–1988

Donald Harley McKillop (15 February 1928 – 19 December 2005) was an English actor.

== Early life ==
McKillop moved with his family to Ashton-under-Lyne when he was three. He studied at the grammar school there, where one of his classmates was fellow actor Ronald Fraser.

== Career ==
After spending four years in repertory, McKillop went on to train at RADA.

Notable roles include Bert the Landlord in the Doctor Who fifth and final serial of the eighth season, The Dæmons in 1971, Jack in The Likely Lads, Bill in Rosie and as Sgt. McKechnie in the first series of the Scottish TV production Sutherland's Law, opposite Maev Alexander. He appeared in five episodes of Dr. Finlay's Casebook between 1964 and 1970. He also appeared in notable films such as The Breaking of Bumbo (1970), An American Werewolf in London (1981) and Walter (1982).

== Other work ==
During the late 1950s and 70s, between acting work, McKillop worked as a metalwork teacher, firstly in the late 1950s at Manvers Bilateral School in Nottingham and then at Sir Roger Manwood's School in Kent in the 1970s.

== Filmography ==
Year	Title	Role	Notes
1961	The Sinister Man	Reporter	
1969	Otley	Police Driver	As Donald McKillop
1970	The Breaking of Bumbo	R.S.M.	
1973	The Hireling	Boxing Match MC	Uncredited
1981	An American Werewolf in London	Inspector Villiers	
1982	Walter	Mr Lipman	TV movie
