= Maev Alexander =

Scottish actress

Maev Alexander, also Maeve Alexander (born Maev Alexandra Reid McConnell on 3 February 1948) is a Scottish television and stage actress. Aside from her numerous stage appearances including Cleopatra and in The Mousetrap at the St Martin's Theatre in London, she is perhaps best known for playing the assistant Christine Russell in the early 1970s Scottish TV series Sutherland's Law, as Janet Campbell in the 18th century set The New Road, and as WPC Sandra Williams in the British police drama The Gentle Touch (1981-2). She is married to Simon Dunmore, a theatre director and author on acting.

== Career ==
=== Television ===
Alexander was born in Glasgow in 1948. She began her television career in 1966, playing three roles in This Man Craig. She followed this with a role as Madge in an episode of the BBC production, The Revenue Men. In 1970, she starred in an episode of another BBC television production The Borderers opposite Michael Gambon and Iain Cuthbertson, set in a village on the Scottish-English border in the Tudor period.

In 1972 she made an appearance in the ITV legal drama The Main Chance, and began portraying the character of Christine Russell in the Scottish TV film production Sutherland's Law, and starred in nine episodes of the television series the following year opposite Don McKillop. Her performance was praised; The Spectator said "The only moment of pleasure in this long fifty minutes was the occasional sight of Maev Alexander as Sutherland's plump, pretty clerk, but there were long and arid intervals between her appearance." In 1973, Alexander also had a leading role as Janet Campbell in the 19th century set The New Road, opposite David Ashton and John Grieve.

In 1975 she appeared in Angels, a production which included actors such as Carol Holmes, Kathryn Apanowicz, Julia Williams, and Pauline Quirke. She appeared in The New Avengers in 1976, playing the character of Mrs Turner in the episode "The Tale of the Big Why". In 1977 she portrayed the wife of Fred in A Christmas Carol TV movie. In 1979 she played Claudine in an episode of the detective series, Hazell. In 1981 she joined the cast of the British police drama The Gentle Touch, playing the character of WPC Sandra Williams. From 1980 to 1982 she also played Jennifer Knowles-Ripley in the situation comedy, Holding the Fort.

Alexander had a brief stint co-presenting the BBC's flagship consumer affairs show, the light-hearted That's Life! alongside Doc Cox.

In 1989, Alexander played Lady Cockpurse in Gavin Millar's TV movie Scoop. She featured alongside actors such as Denholm Elliott, Michael Hordern, Herbert Lom, Nicola Pagett and Donald Pleasence. In 2007 she had a small role as an autograph hound in Gillian Armstrong's supernatural romantic thriller Death Defying Acts, an Anglo-Australian production which starred Guy Pearce and Catherine Zeta-Jones. In 2010 she appeared in Doctors.

=== Stage ===
Alexander has appeared in many stage productions, and has worked for the Royal Shakespeare Company. In 1968 she starred in a theatrical production of Anton Chekhov's The Cherry Orchard under director Michael Blakemore. She has appeared in theatre in Ireland and at the Straydogs Theatre and has received critical acclaim for her stage work. At the Portable Theatre in 1971 she starred opposite Hugh Armstrong, Christopher Biggins and Christopher Ravenscroft in Malcolm Griffiths's production of Zonk. In 1973 or 1974 she starred in a Tom Gallagher stage production of The Only Street at the Dublin Festival, with John Hunt and Peggy Marshall. She portrayed Cleopatra opposite Conrad Asquith as Antony in one of her husband Simon Dunmore's theatrical productions and also starred in a production of Agatha Christie's The Mousetrap at the St Martin's Theatre in London, amongst many others.

== Personal life ==
She is married to Simon Dunmore, a theatre director who has authored books on William Shakespeare and acting in general, and is a personal friend of E. M. Yearling. She once shared a flat with Sue Johnston and Denis Lawson in Chiswick.

== Filmography ==
- This Man Craig (TV series) (1966-1967) as Agnes Borland / Ally Ure / Moira
- The Revenue Men (TV series) (1967) as Madge
- The Borderers (TV series) (1970) as Jess Heriot
- The Befrienders (TV series) (1972) as Judy
- The Main Chance (TV series) (1972) as Mrs. Bush
- Sutherland's Law (TV movie) (1972) as Christine Russell
- The New Road (TV series) (1973) as Janet Campbell
- Sutherland's Law (TV series) (1973) as Christine Russell
- Angels (TV series) (1975) as Model Patient
- Play for Today (TV series) (1976)
- The New Avengers (TV series) (1976) as Mrs. Frank Turner
- Leap in the Dark (TV series) (1977) as Constance Potter
- A Christmas Carol (TV movie) (1977) as Fred's Wife
- The Standard (TV series) (1978) as Morag
- Hazell (TV series) (1979) as Claudine
- Kids (TV series) (1979) as Liz
- The Gentle Touch (TV series) (1981-1982) as WPC Sandra Williams
- Holding the Fort (TV series) (1980-1982) as Jennifer Knowles-Ripley
- By the Sword Divided (TV series) (1985) as Masked Woman
- The Fools on the Hill (TV movie) (1986) as Jasmine Bligh
- Scoop (TV movie) (1989) as Lady Cockpurse
- Death Defying Acts (2007) as Autograph Hound
- Doctors (TV series) (2010) as Jane Pennington
