= Iain Cuthbertson =

Scottish actor (1930–2009)

- Cuthbertson as Charles Endell
- Born: 4 January 1930; Glasgow, Scotland
- Died: 4 September 2009 (aged 79); Ayr, Scotland
- Occupation: Actor
- Years active: 1955–2003
- Spouses: Anne Kristen (m. 1964; div. 1988): Janet Smith
- Father: David Cuthbertson

Iain Cuthbertson (4 January 1930 – 4 September 2009) was a Scottish actor and theatre director. He was known for his tall imposing build and also his distinctive gravelly, heavily accented voice. He had lead roles in The Borderers (1968–1970), Tom Brown's Schooldays (1971), Budgie (1971–1972), its spinoff Charles Endell Esquire (1979–1980), Danger UXB (1979) and Sutherland's Law (1973–1976), as well as the films The Railway Children (1970), and Gorillas in the Mist (1988). He guest starred in many prominent British shows including The Avengers, Dr. Finlay's Casebook, The Onedin Line, Survivors, Ripping Yarns, Doctor Who, Z-Cars, Juliet Bravo, Rab C. Nesbitt, Minder, Inspector Morse and Agatha Christie's Poirot.

== Early life ==
Cuthbertson was born in 1930, the son of the biochemist Sir David Cuthbertson, and brought up in Glasgow. He was educated at Glasgow Academy. He moved to Aberdeen with his family and attended Aberdeen Grammar School and the University of Aberdeen, where he graduated with an MA honours degree in French and Spanish. His first break as an actor was on radio while at university.

Cuthbertson spent two years' national service in the Black Watch. During that time he was ordered to act as prisoner's friend (defence counsel) at the court martial of a soldier accused of appearing late on parade and then assaulting his superior officer when he eventually did turn up. He managed to get the soldier cleared of the more serious charge.

Cuthbertson's original wish was for a job in the Foreign Office, but he became a radio journalist with the BBC in Glasgow.

== Theatre career ==
Cuthbertson started acting at the Glasgow Citizens' Theatre in 1958 and became General Manager and Director of Productions in 1962. In that year the theatre hosted an exhibition of work by the artist Stewart Bowman Johnson He played William Wallace in the Edinburgh International Festival production of Sydney Goodsir Smith's play, The Wallace, in August 1960, giving what the playwright Robert McLellan described as "one of the few great performances in the history of the Scottish Theatre". He played the title role in the Glasgow Mayfest production of Hugh MacDiarmid's A Drunk Man Looks at the Thistle in 1992.

In 1965 he became Associate Director of London's Royal Court Theatre.

== Television career ==
Cuthbertson's most memorable television role was as the eponymous Procurator Fiscal in the long running Sutherland's Law, a television series made by BBC Scotland between 1973 and 1976. The series had originated as a stand-alone edition of the portmanteau programme Drama Playhouse in 1972 in which Derek Francis played Sutherland and which was then commissioned as an ongoing series: the producer was Frank Cox. Sutherland's Law dealt with the duties of the Procurator Fiscal in a small Scottish town. The major cast members included Cuthbertson (as John Sutherland), Gareth Thomas, Moultrie Kelsall, Victor Carin, Martin Cochrane, Maev Alexander and Edith MacArthur.

A rather different achievement was his portrayal of the criminal and businessman Charlie Endell in both Budgie (London Weekend Television/ITV) with Adam Faith (1971–1972) and its sequel Charles Endell Esquire (Scottish Television/ITV) in 1979.

Cuthbertson's other roles include the lead in The Borderers (BBC, 1968–1970), Tom Brown's Schooldays (BBC, 1971) (as Thomas Arnold), The Stone Tape (BBC, 1972), Children of the Stones (HTV/ITV, 1977), The Voyage of Charles Darwin, Danger UXB (Thames Television/ITV, 1979), The House With Green Shutters (BBC, 1980). He appeared in the pilot episode of Rab C Nesbitt (1988) as a magistrate.

Cuthbertson suffered a crippling stroke in January 1982, which forced him to give up theatre for fear of forgetting his lines. He resumed television and film work, though, as his lines could be written on crib boards. His first role following his stroke was as the villainous Scunner Campbell in Super Gran (Tyne Tees Television/ITV, 1985). In 1989 he played the villain Brett Savernake in the episode of Campion entitled "Sweet Danger".

Cuthbertson's minor parts in ongoing series include appearances in Z-Cars (BBC), The Avengers (ABC/ITV), the title character's former mentor in Inspector Morse (Central Television/ITV), Bulman (Granada Television/ITV), Ripping Yarns (BBC), The Duchess of Duke Street, Colonel Mannering in Adam Adamant Lives! story D For Destruction (1966) and Garron in the Doctor Who story The Ribos Operation. He also appeared in: Diamond Crack Diamond, The Onedin Line (BBC), Survivors (BBC), Scotch on the Rocks, The Adventures of Black Beauty (London Weekend/ITV), Minder (ITV), The Ghosts of Motley Hall (Granada/ITV), Juliet Bravo (BBC), Casualty (BBC), The Mourning Brooch, Casting the Runes and McPhee the Mother and Me.

On film, Cuthbertson appeared as Charles Waterbury in The Railway Children (1970).

== Personal life ==
Cuthbertson's first marriage, to Anne Kristen in 1964, was dissolved in 1988. His second wife, Janet Smith, survived him.

From 1975 to 1978, Cuthbertson served as Rector of the University of Aberdeen. He listed his hobbies as sailing and fishing, and, after retiring, he lived in Dalrymple, Ayrshire.

Cuthbertson suffered a severe stroke in 1982, which caused paralysis down one side of his body and speech loss. It took him almost two years to recover sufficiently to be able to act again. Although he avoided live theatre work thereafter, owing to a fear of forgetting or stumbling on lines, he was still able to take parts in films and television. He died in 2009 at Ayr Hospital and was cremated.

== Filmography ==
=== Film ===
Year	Film	Role	Director	Notes
1970	The Railway Children	Charles Waterbury	Lionel Jeffries	
1972	Up the Chastity Belt	Teutonic Knight	Bob Kellett	
1984	John Wycliffe: The Morning Star	Chancellor Rigg	Tony Tew	
1985	The Assam Garden	Arthur	Mary McMurray	
1986	Smart Money	Mr. Whyte	Bernard Rose	
1988	Gorillas in the Mist	Dr. Louis Leakey	Michael Apted	
1989	Scandal	Lord Hailsham	Michael Caton-Jones	
1989	The Clouds	Voice	Patrick Keiller	Short film
1991	Let Him Have It	Sir David Maxwell-Fyfe	Peter Medak	
1994	Chasing the Deer	Tullibardine	Graham Holloway	
1998	The Tichborne Claimant	Dr. McKechnie	David Yates	
2001	Strictly Sinatra	Connolly	Peter Capaldi	
2003	Hamlet	Ghost	Michael Mundell	

=== Television ===
Year	Title	Role	Notes
1957	The Boy David	Goliath of Gath	Television film
1959	Guilty Together	Jock Macdonald	Television film
1960	Para Handy - Master Mariner	Hurricane Jack	Episode: "A Happy New Year"
1960	ITV Play of the Week	Judd	Episode: "The Accomplices"
1962	BBC Sunday-Night Play	Provost Thomson	Episode: "Storm in a Teacup"
1966	The Wednesday Play	Major Mallet	Episode: "Toddler on the Run"
1966	Adam Adamant Lives!	Colonel Mannering	Episode: "D for Destruction"
1966	ITV Sunday Night Drama	Aegetes	Episode: "Four Triumphant: St Andrew"
1966	This Man Craig	Campbell Maddox	Episode: "Fresh Off the Boat"
1967	Sir Arthur Conan Doyle	Dr. Markham	Episode: "Crabbe's Practice"
1968-1970	The Borderers	Sir Walter Ker of Cessford	26 episodes
1969	The Avengers	Kruger	Episode: "Thingumajig"
1969	Mogul	King Watt	Episode: "This Place Is a Paradise, Mister"
1969-79	ITV Playhouse	Mr. Campbell QC/Julian Karswell	2 episodes
1970	Department S	Kendall	Episode: "Spencer Bodily Is Sixty Years Old"
1970	Manhunt	Helldorf	Episode: "With a Sort of Love"
1970	Thirty-Minute Theatre	William Stead	Episode: "Lilly"
1970	Diamond Crack Diamond	Mark Terson	4 episodes
1971	Dr. Finlay's Casebook	The Provost	Episode: "The Burgess Ticket"
1971-1972	Budgie	Charlie Endell	24 episodes
1971	Tom Brown's Schooldays	Dr. Thomas Arnold	Miniseries
1971	The Onedin Line	Captain Kirkwood	Episode: "Mutiny"
1971	The Stone Tape	Roy Collinson	Television film
1972	The Adventures of Black Beauty	Sergeant Major Fletcher	Episode: "The Recruiting Sergeant"
1973	The New Road	Colonel Barisdale	2 episodes
1973	Scotch on the Rocks	Chief Constable Blair	4 episodes
1973-1976	Sutherland's Law	John Sutherland	46 episodes
1973	The Protectors	Wyatt	Episode: "Petard"
1973	Arthur of the Britons	Bavick	Episode: "Daughter of the King"
1974	ITV Sunday Night Theatre	The Doctor	Episode: "Geography of a Horse Dreamer"
1974	The Pallisers	Major Mackintosh	Episode: "Part Fourteen"
1974-77	Play for Today	Headmaster/Richard Cleaver	2 episodes
1976	Caesar and Cleopatra	Rufio	Television film
1977	Children of the Stones	Rafael Hendrick/Sir Joshua Litten	Miniseries
1977	The Ghosts of Motley Hall	Godfrey of Basingstoke	Episode: "Godfrey of Basingstoke"
1977	Survivors	McAlister	Episode: "Power"
1977	The Duchess of Duke Street	Vicar	2 episodes
1977	Ripping Yarns	Dr. Farson	Episode: "Murder at Moorstones Manor"
1977	The Sunday Drama	Gilbert Neilson	Episode: "Caledonian Cascade"
1978	The Standard	Sir Henry Lockwood	Episode: "The Name of the Game"
1978	Doctor Who	Garron	Serial: "The Ribos Operation"
1978	Z-Cars	Det. Chief Supt. Stanworth	Episode: "Departures"
1978	The Voyage of Charles Darwin	Dr. Robert Darwin	3 episodes
1979	Danger UXB	Doctor Gillespie	6 episodes
1979	The Mourning Brooch	Dicky Doig	Miniseries
1979-1980	Charles Endell, Esq	Charlie Endell	6 episodes
1979	The Dick Francis Thriller: The Racing Game	Lankester	Episode: "Horsenap"
1980	We, the Accused	Inspector Boltro	Miniseries
1980	The Dick Emery Christmas Show: For Whom the Jingle Bells Toll	Jock 'The Razor' Fraser	Television film
1981	The Walls of Jericho	Alexander Russell	3 episodes
1981	Vice Versa	Dr. Grimstone	7 episodes
1982	Rep	J.C. Benton	Television miniseries
1983	Storyboard	Editor	Episode: "Lytton's Diary"
1984	The Glory Boys	Minister	Episode: "Episode Three"
1984	Juliet Bravo	Defence Counsel	Episode: "Lost and Found"
1985	Off Peak	Dick Corbett	Television film
1985-1987	Super Gran	The Scunner Campbell	27 episodes
1986	First Among Equals	Colin Dawson	Episode: "Episode Two"
1986	The Return of the Antelope	Dr. McMurdo	Episode: "Philippa's Brave Deed"
1986	The Stamp of Greatness	Sir Arthur Conan Doyle	Episode: "Sir Arthur Conan Doyle the Man Who Was Sherlock Holmes"
1987	Bulman	Desmond Geraldine	Episode: "Death by Misadventure"
1987	The Venus de Milo Instead	Headmaster	Television film
1987	A Perfect Spy	Makepeace Watermaster	Episode One
1988	Hannay	Sheriff Elliston	Episode: "Act of Riot"
1988	Ten Great Writers of the Modern World	Mynheer Peeperkorn	Episode: "Thomas Mann's 'The Magic Mountain'"
1988	The Ray Bradbury Theatre	Prosecuting Counsel	Episode: "Punishment Without Crime"
1988-1992	Rab C. Nesbitt	Various	3 episodes
1989	Minder	Bernard McKenna	Episode: "The Wrong Goodbye"
1989	The Justice Game	Jack Flynn	4 episodes
1989		Seer of Lublin	Episode: "The Spirit of Man"; Segment: "The Night of Simhat Torah"
1989	Hard Cases	Magistrate	Episode: "Episode Seven"
1989	City Lights	Dr. Davis	Episode: "Play It Again, Willie"
1989-1991	Screenplay	Various	3 episodes
1990	Campion	Brett Savanake	Episode: "Sweet Danger"
1990	Inspector Morse	Desmond McNutt	Episode: "Masonic Mysteries"
1992	The Guilty	Lord Chancellor	Television film
1993	Agatha Christie's Poirot	Gervase Chevenix	Episode: "Dead Man's Mirror"
1994	Headhunters	Malcolm Standish	Episode: "The Golden Hello"
1994	Moonacre	Father Francis	6 episodes
1994	Seaforth	Lord Scawton	Television miniseries
1995	Oliver's Travels	Davidson	Episode: "Do We Look Like That?"
1995	The Tales of Para Handy	Angus Monroe	Episode: "Para Handy's Piper"
1995-1999	Casualty	Dermot Needle/Albert	2 episodes
1997	Painted Lady	Charles Stafford	Television miniseries
1997	The Baldy Man		2.03 "Barbecue: China Doll"
2000	Brotherly Love	Robert MacDougall	1.05 "Art and Soul"

== Radio ==
- 1981 Hatter's Castle as James Brodie; by A J Cronin; BBC R4 Classic Serial 5 parts 11/1/1981-8/11/1981.
- 1988 Our Roman Cousins by Bruce Stewart; BBC R4 Saturday Night Theatre 30/01/1988.
- 1993 Twelfth Night as Malvolio; BBC R3 3/1/1993.
- 1998 Richard Barton: General Practitioner as Jock; BBCR4 10/4/1998.

Academic offices
Preceded by Michael Barratt	Rector of the University of Aberdeen; 1975–1978	Succeeded by Sandy Gall
