= The Gnomes of Dulwich =

1969 British TV sitcom

- One of the few surviving pictures of The Gnomes of Dulwich
- Genre: Sitcom
- Written by: Jimmy Perry
- Starring: Hugh Lloyd; Terry Scott; John Clive; Leon Thau
- Country of origin: United Kingdom
- Original language: English
- No. of series: 1
- No. of episodes: 6

Production
- Producers: Sydney Lotterby; Graham Muir
- Running time: 30 minutes

Original release
- Network: BBC 2
- Release: 12 May – 16 June 1969

The Gnomes of Dulwich is a British television sitcom originally broadcast from 12 May 1969 to 16 June 1969. Written by Jimmy Perry, the show starred Terry Scott, Hugh Lloyd, John Clive, Leon Thau, Anne de Vigier and Lynn Dalby as garden gnomes living at 25 Telegraph Road, Dulwich, London, England. The title is a reference to the term "Gnomes of Zurich".

== Background ==
Jimmy Perry was very interested in gnomes and originally only intended it to be a short sketch for The Morecambe and Wise Show, but it was his wife who convinced him that there was a whole series in it. Unlike Perry's other series, such as Dad's Army and It Ain't Half Hot Mum, he did not write The Gnomes of Dulwich with his writing partner David Croft. Although the series was fairly well received, it was not successful enough to warrant a second series.

The series saw actors Hugh Lloyd and Terry Scott work together in a similar way in which they were seen in the earlier series Hugh and I, which was directed by Croft. Both actors were dubious to start with, but eventually came round to the idea. This was the last time the two appeared together on television. Like other series which Perry wrote, he had a small cameo appearance in the last episode. In 2009, he said of the series "Terry Scott and Hugh Lloyd were two gnomes who would sit by a pond and commented on life, race, religion – everything. It became a little cult." The show was rebroadcast once on BBC1 in 1970. Due to the BBC having no archival policy until 1978, all known tapes were wiped and only a few stills and some audio fragments have survived.

Colin Bean, who played a variety of different roles in the series, recalled the show in his autobiography, commenting "Jimmy and Gilda were in my scene also as ornaments on a bric-a-brac stall at a garden party at the rear of 10 Downing Street ...Jimmy was a plaster bust of Napoleon and I was a matching bust, on a named base, of Beethoven ...My few lines played on Beethoven’s deafness (Da da da dah!) after Napoleon had made some cutting remarks, the joke being that at the end of the garden party the only items left on the bric-a-brac stall were the two garden gnomes." Frank Williams was in the same scene, and recounted his experiences in his memoirs, writing "Hugh and Terry played garden gnomes. I was in an episode in which the gnomes had been purchased at a Labour Party Bazaar by Mary Wilson, wife of the Prime Minister. They stood at ground level contemplating the legs of the various guests at a garden party. Clad in Carnaby Street trousers (it was quite difficult to find anything that fitted me in that haunt of trendy young people) I wandered around as a society photographer. As the audience only heard my voice and saw my disembodied legs they were never quite sure who I was, but I decided that this was my one chance to play royalty and that I was Lord Snowdon."

== Main cast ==
- Terry Scott as Big
- Hugh Lloyd as Small
- John Clive as Old
- Leon Thau as Plastic
- Anne de Vigier as Dolly
- Lynn Dalby as Rita
- Roger Brierley as Gnome
- Linda James as Gnome
- Colin Bean as various roles
- Barry Cryer as Gnome
- Ronald Fletcher as Gnome
- Chris Gannon as Gnome
- Jack Haig as Gnome
- Alan Haines as Gnome
- Nigel Hawthorne as Gnome
- Horace James as Gnome
- Myvanwy Jenn as Gnome
- Roy Kinnear as 'Big' replica
- Derek Lanyon as Gnome
- Max Latimer as Gnome
- John Laurie as Top Gnome
- Nicholas McArdle as Gnome
- Tony McLaren as Gnome
- Jim McManus as Gnome
- Gilda Perry as Gnome
- Jimmy Perry as Gnome
- Gillian Phelps as Gnome
- Matthew Roberton as Gnome
- Celia Robinson as Gnome
- Michael Slater as Gnome
- Colin Spaull as Gnome
- Bernard Spear as Gnome
- Lionel Wheeler as Gnome
- Frank Williams as Gnome
- Marguerite Young as Gnome

== Episodes ==
Series	Episode no.	First broadcast
1	1	12 May 1969
1	2	19 May 1969
1	3	26 May 1969
1	4	2 June 1969
1	5	9 June 1969
1	6	16 June 1969
