= Sutherland's Law =

British TV drama series (1973–1976)

- Created by: Lindsay Galloway
- Starring: Iain Cuthbertson
- Theme music composer: Anthony Isaac
- Country of origin: United Kingdom
- No. of series: 5
- No. of episodes: 46 (17 missing)

Production
- Running time: 50 minutes

Original release
- Network: BBC1
- Release: 6 June 1973 – 31 August 1976

Sutherland's Law is a television series made by BBC Scotland created by Lindsay Galloway, starring Iain Cuthbertson as John Sutherland, the Procurator Fiscal in the fictional Scottish town of Glendoran. A total of 46 episodes over 5 series were produced and broadcast between 1973 and 1976.

== Background ==
The series had originated as a stand-alone edition of the portmanteau programme Drama Playhouse in 1972 in which Derek Francis played Sutherland and was then commissioned as an ongoing series. The producer was Frank Cox.

The series was commissioned during a period when the BBC engaged in a five year plan for program development at BBC Scotland, with the emphasis on producing high cost productions made to a premium standard suitable for the national audience, while retaining its Scottish identity. This series was a result of this policy, and it became the first popular drama series produced by BBC Scotland that garnered national appeal, it eventually gathered up to audiences of 17 million viewers.

Notable directors included Raymond Menmuir who directed three episodes, Geraint Morris, Michael E. Briant and Pennant Roberts who directed two episodes respectively, and Douglas Camfield who directed episode 2 of series 2 "Caesar's Wife" transmitted on 22 May 1974

The exteriors for the series were filmed in Oban, Argyll.

The signature tune was The Land of the Mountain and the Flood, by Hamish MacCunn. Series creator Lindsay Galloway released a novel based on the series in 1974.

== Cast ==
- Iain Cuthbertson – (John Sutherland/... 1973-1976 / Series 1-5 / 46 episodes)
- Martin Cochrane – (David Drummond/... 1974-1976 / Series 2-5 / 33 episodes)
- Edith MacArthur – (Dr. Judith Roberts/... 1974-1976 / Series 2-5 / 24 episodes)
- Victor Carin – (Chief Insp. Menzies/... 1973-1976 / Series 1-5 / 20 episodes)
- Maev Alexander – (Christine Russell/... 1973-1974 / Series 1-2 / 19 episodes)
- Don McKillop – (Sergeant McKenzie/... 1973-1974 / Series 1-2 / 18 episodes)
- Harriet Buchan – (Gail Munro/... 1974-1975 / Series 2-3 / 17 episodes)
- Virginia Stark – (Helen Matheson/... 1975-1976 / Series 4-5 / 17 episodes)
- Gareth Thomas – (Alec Duthrie/... 1973 / Series 1 / 12 episodes)
- Moultrie Kelsall – (Sheriff Derwent/... 1973-1976 / Series 1-5 / 12 episodes)
- Xanthi Gardner – (Sheriff Clark/... 1973-1976 / Series 1-5 / 9 episodes)
- Sarah Collier – (Kate Cameron/... 1976 / Series 5 / 8 episodes)

== List of Episodes ==
=== Series 1 (1973) ===
No. overall	No. in Series	Title	Air Date	Directed By	Written By	Archival Status	Media
1	1	"A Cry for Help"	6 June 1973	Roderick Graham	Martin Worth	Exists	PAL 2" colour videotape
2	2	"The Sea"	13 June 1973	?	Anthony Coburn	Missing	n/a
3	3	"The Travelling People"	20 June 1973	Roderick Graham	Neil McCarty	Missing	n/a
4	4	"The Dutchies"	27 June 1973	Paul Ciappessoni	David Fisher	Missing	n/a
5	5	"The Running Man"	4 July 1973	Geraint Morris	Jack Gerson	Exists	PAL 2" colour videotape
6	6	"The Return"	11 July 1973	Paul Ciappessoni	John Foster	Exists	PAL 2" colour videotape
7	7	"The Ship"	18 July 1973	Brian Farnham	John Wiles	Exists	PAL 2" colour videotape
8	8	"The Runaway"	1 August 1973	Geraint Morris	George Byatt	Exists	PAL 2" colour videotape
9	9	"The Climb"	8 August 1973	Brian Farnham	Lindsay Galloway	Exists	PAL 2" colour videotape
10	10	"The Family"	15 August 1973	George Spenton-Foster	Tom Wright	Exists	16mm t/r
11	11	"The House"	22 August 1973	Brian McIntosh	Lindsay Galloway	Exists	PAL 2" colour videotape
12	12	"The Prodigal"	29 August 1973	George Spenton-Foster	Alun Richards	Exists	PAL 2" colour videotape
13	13	"The Killing"	5 September 1973	Brian Farnham	John Gould	Exists	PAL 2" colour videotape

=== Series 2 (1974) ===
No. overall	No. in Series	Title	Air Date	Directed By	Written By	Archival Status	Media
14	1	"The Thirteenth Man"	15 May 1974	Frank Cox	Lindsay Galloway	Missing	n/a
15	2	"Caesar's Wife"	22 May 1974	Douglas Camfield	Lindsay Galloway	Missing	n/a
16	3	"The Condemned"	29 May 1974	Pennant Roberts	Jack Gerson	Missing	n/a
17	4	"The Break"	5 June 1974	Martin Patrick Friend	Lindsay Galloway	Missing	n/a
18	5	"The Retreat"	12 June 1974	Pennant Roberts	Lindsay Galloway	Missing	n/a
19	6	"The Winner"	10 July 1974	Paul Ciappessoni	Arthur Jones	Missing	n/a
20	7	"The Partnership"	17 July 1974	Martin Patrick Friend	Anthony Read	Missing	n/a
21	8	"The Evidence"	24 July 1974	Gilchrist Calder	Allan Prior	Missing	n/a

=== Series 3 (1974) ===
No. overall	No. in Series	Title	Air Date	Directed By	Written By	Archival Status	Media
22	1	"Just a Little Death"	3 September 1974	Gilchrist Calder	Neil McCarty	Missing	n/a
23	2	"Matters of Trust"	10 September 1974	Pennant Roberts	Ian Curteis	Missing	n/a
24	3	"The Device"	17 September 1974	Terence Williams	Ian Curteis	Missing	n/a
25	4	"Who Cares?"	24 September 1974	Frank Cox	Lindsay Galloway	Missing	n/a
26	5	"Pay Off"	1 October 1974	Pennant Roberts	Lindsay Galloway	Missing	n/a

=== Series 4 (1975) ===
No. overall	No. in Series	Title	Air Date	Directed By	Written By	Archival Status	Media
27	1	"In the Deep End"	27 May 1975	Don Leaver	Lindsay Galloway	Exists	PAL 2" colour videotape
28	2	"A Slight Case of Matrimony"	3 June 1975	Michael E. Briant	Jack Gerson	Exists	PAL 2" colour videotape
29	3	"No Second Chance"	10 June 1975	Don Leaver	Lindsay Galloway	Exists	PAL 2" colour videotape
30	4	"A Murmur of Malice"	17 June 1975	Michael E. Briant	Robert Banks Stewart	Exists	PAL 2" colour videotape
31	5	"The Italian Debt"	24 June 1975	Raymond Menmuir	Tom Wright	Exists	PAL 2" colour videotape
32	6	"A Lady of Considerable Talent"	1 July 1975	Raymond Menmuir	Lindsay Galloway	Exists	PAL 2" colour videotape
33	7	"Creatures in a Private Zoo"	8 July 1975	Andrew Morgan	Jack Gerson	Exists	PAL 2" colour videotape
34	8	"A Good Place for Murder"	15 July 1975	Martyn Friend	Lindsay Galloway	Missing	n/a
35	9	"A Matter of Self Defence"	22 July 1975	Ben Rea	Robert Banks Stewart	Exists	PAL 2" colour videotape
36	10	"The Rag Doll"	29 July 1975	Martyn Friend	Lindsay Galloway	Exists	PAL 2" colour videotape
37	11	"The End of the Good Times"	5 August 1975	Ben Rea	Jack Gerson	Exists	PAL 2" colour videotape
38	12	"The Fixer"	12 August 1975	Raymond Menmuir	Lindsay Galloway	Exists	PAL 2" colour videotape

=== Series 5 (1976) ===
No. overall	No. in Series	Title	Air Date	Directed By	Written By	Archival Status	Media
39	1	"Jacob's Ladder"	6 July 1976	Paul Ciappessoni	Lindsay Galloway	Exists	PAL 2" colour videotape
40	2	"Blind Jump"	13 July 1976	Paul Ciappessoni	Robert Banks Stewart	Exists	PAL 2" colour videotape
41	3	"Small Print"	20 July 1976	Jonathan Alwyn	Lindsay Galloway	Exists	PAL 2" colour videotape
42	4	"The Eye of Chameleon"	3 August 1976	Roger Tucker	Jack Gerson	Exists	PAL 2" colour videotape
43	5	"Murphy"	10 August 1976	John Bruce	Lindsay Galloway	Exists	PAL 2" colour videotape
44	6	"Next Year... In Jerusalem"	17 August 1976	Jonathan Alwyn	Jack Gerson	Exists	PAL 2" colour videotape
45	7	"The Hot Water Boat"	24 August 1976	John Bruce	Robert Banks Stewart	Exists	PAL 2" colour videotape
46	8	"Shades of Black"	31 August 1976	Roger Tucker	Lindsay Galloway	Exists	PAL 2" colour videotape

== Archival Status ==
Out of the 46 episodes that were produced, only 28 survive as original PAL 2" colour videotape masters, while a further episode "The Family" from Series 1 exists as a b&w 16mm telerecording. 17 episodes are currently missing from the archives, this includes 3 episodes from Series 1, a single episode from Series 4 and all of Series 2 and 3 respectively.

== Home media ==
The DVD of selected episodes from Sutherland's Law Series 1 was released on Region 2 by Acorn Media UK in the UK on 1 June 2009.
