= Dinosaurs: Myths & Reality =

- Written by: Bob Carruthers
- Directed by: Graham Holloway
- Starring: Michael Brett-Surman and David Norman
- Narrated by: Fred Applegate
- Country of origin: United Kingdom
- Original language: English

Production
- Producer: Bob Carruthers
- Running time: 60 minutes
- Production companies: Castle Communications, Cromwell Productions

Original release
- Release: 18 January 1995

Dinosaurs: Myths & Reality is a 1995 British television documentary, hosted by Fred Applegate and directed by Graham Holloway; aimed at families, it tests viewers knowledge about dinosaurs, utilizing graphics, paintings, museum replicas, moving models, clips from movies, dinosaur fossils and interpretations by paleontologists Michael Brett-Surman and David Norman.
