= Knights of God =

1987 British TV children's series

- Created by: Richard Cooper
- Written by: Richard Cooper
- Directed by: Andrew Morgan; Michael Kerrigan
- Starring: George Winter; Claire Parker; John Woodvine; Gareth Thomas; Don Henderson; Patrick Troughton; Nigel Stock
- Composer: Christopher Gunning
- Country of origin: United Kingdom
- Original language: English
- No. of episodes: 13

Production
- Executive producer: Anna Home
- Producer: John Dale
- Running time: 26 minutes
- Production company: Television South

Original release
- Network: ITV
- Release: 6 September – 6 December 1987

Knights of God is a British science fiction children's television serial, produced by TVS and first broadcast on ITV in 1987. It was written by Richard Cooper, a writer who had previously worked in both children's and adult television drama. Set in the year 2020, it showed a Britain ruled by the Knights of God, a fascist and anti-Christian religious order that came to power during a brutal civil war twenty years previously. It starred George Winter as Gervase Owen Edwards, the Welsh son of a resistance leader (Gareth Thomas), and John Woodvine as the Prior Mordrin, leader of the eponymous cult. Patrick Troughton played Arthur, the apparent leader of the English resistance, and Julian Fellowes played Mordrin's ambitious and ruthless second-in-command, Brother Hugo.

== Cast ==
- George Winter as Gervase Edwards
- Claire Parker as Julia Clarke
- John Woodvine as Prior Mordrin
- Julian Fellowes as Brother Hugo
- Gareth Thomas as Owen Edwards
- Patrick Troughton as Arthur
- Shirley Stelfox as Beth Edwards
- Nigel Stock as Brother Simon
- Barrie Cookson as Brigadier Clarke
- Christopher Bowen as Helicopter Pilot
- Don Henderson as Colley
- Peter Childs as Brother Tyrell
- Tenniel Evans as Dafydd
- Owen Teale as Dai
- John Vine as Brother Williams
- Anne Stallybrass as Nell
- Roy Boyd as Fenn

== Plot summary ==
In 2020, Britain is ruled by the Knights of God, a fascist religious order – founded by the Prior Mordrin (Woodvine) – that came to power during a brutal civil war that began in 2000, during which the Royal Family were supposedly all slaughtered by Hugo (Fellowes) and the civilian government collapsed leaving the Knights free to step into the power vacuum. Mordrin has renamed the south of England "Anglia", while the north and Scotland – which has only recently been brought under control – he calls "Northumbria." In between is the "Wasteland", the former industrial regions of Lancashire and southern Yorkshire, where the remaining resistance fighters – regarded as terrorists by the Knights – are still at large. For the time being Mordrin sees the Wasteland as a convenient buffer to communications and travel between Anglia and Northumbria. Winchester is temporarily serving as the nation's capital, as most of London was destroyed in the war and reconstruction work is hampered by lack of resources.

Gervase Owen Edwards (Winter) has grown up in Wales, which has finally succumbed to the rule of the Knights, although the resistance led by his father, Owen (Thomas), remains active. When most civilians in Wales are interned for not showing sufficient enthusiasm for the end of the war and loyalty to the Knights, Gervase is sent to a "re-education and training camp," initially accompanied by Owen disguised as a Knight, who tells him that it is important that he lives. During the journey, Gervase meets an English girl, Julia Clarke (Parker).

Mordrin becomes obsessed with the idea of destroying the leader of all the resistance to him, and when Gervase is identified as Owen's son, Mordrin threatens to execute Julia unless he denounces his father and joins the Knights of God. After he agrees, Mordrin uses mind-altering drugs to place the post-hypnotic suggestion in Gervase's mind that he should seek out and destroy the Prior's "greatest enemy." He is then released, ostensibly to be allowed to find Julia, who has escaped from the camp. Unknown to Gervase, Mordrin needs Julia alive as well, as she is the daughter of Brigadier Clarke, the senior officer in the Coldstream Guards, the last remnant of the British Army, which has been allowed to survive for ceremonial purposes, all other units having been absorbed into the Knights. Meanwhile, Hugo plots to overthrow Mordrin and take power himself, and sends his own agents to intercept and kill Gervase.

After Gervase finds Julia, they are ambushed and captured by English resistance fighters led by Colley (Henderson). Gervase is then put on trial for killing one of Colley's men during the ambush, and is found guilty and sentenced to death. Owen threatens to use his own men to free his son, but Arthur – who it is revealed is Mordrin's father (reminiscent of King Arthur and Sir Mordred) – intercedes and publicly banishes Gervase to the Wasteland, while secretly tasking him with finding the one surviving member of the Royal Family – a King to unite the country against the Knights. Mordrin becomes increasingly paranoid, and secretly plans to declare himself King, and even commissions the manufacture of a new crown.

Realising the threat Hugo represents, Mordrin has him arrested, but he escapes to London as dissident Knights flock to join him. Gervase and Julia travel to Canterbury, an enclave where the Anglican Church is allowed to survive. Mordrin issues orders for them to be intercepted, but they are "captured" and taken into the city by Brigadier Clarke and his men, disguised as Knights.

It is revealed that Gervase himself is the King, and it is only his love for Julia that prevents him from obeying Mordrin's command by killing himself. Hugo's faction attacks Mordrin's headquarters, and the resistance – bolstered by the defecting Coldstream Guards – prepares to finish off whoever is left. Owen slips away, having previously vowed to kill Mordrin for what he did to Gervase, but is shot and injured in the battle between the Knights. Hugo corners Mordrin, but is killed himself, and the Prior escapes with his crown into surrounding forest. As he prepared to place the crown on his own head, Mordrin is shot by the mortally injured Owen, who then himself dies. When the battle is over, Arthur takes the crown from Mordrin's dead hand and presents it to Gervase, telling him to rule wisely.

== Novelisation ==
Richard Cooper's novel based on the same storyline was published around the time of the UK television screenings. The narrative generally follows that of the TV serial, the major exception being that Nell is not shot during the firefight at the cottage. Instead Arthur leads her, Gervase and Julia to the Resistance HQ in the Wasteland. Since Gervase and Julia are not then tracked by Colley and his men, culminating in the death of Fenn in the ambush, Gervase is put on trial solely for having joined the Order and denounced Owen. At the climax of the story, Mordrin is shot by the mortally wounded Owen inside the Knights' chapel at the headquarters, rather than in the surrounding forest. These differences and other details – such as that the Knights wear black but otherwise conventional battledress – suggest that the book was written before production and that the television script was therefore expanded to fit the desired length.

The novel also contains much additional detail about the world of 2020 and the Civil War, such as Ireland as a whole having become an American state, and the source of much of the rebels' supplies, despite an official arms embargo.

The civil war was caused by the breakdown of law and order resulting from high unemployment of ten million. The Knights launched a coup, but the Royal Family fled to the North, which rose in revolt against the coup, with the final battle of the war taking place in York. The infant Gervase was smuggled out of the burning city, while all other members of the family were killed.

It is mentioned that whilst Hugo uses his position to secure personal luxuries, and especially alcohol, Mordrin is a teetotal vegetarian, with hints that he has obsessive compulsive disorder. It is also clarified that a reaction to the religious trappings of the Order has been a unification of all Christian faiths, with many believing that Mordrin himself is the Antichrist. Gervase is explicitly identified as King Edward IX, a name he finds acceptable for its similarity to his assumed surname of Edwards.

== Production ==
The TV Times reported Don Henderson's appearance in the serial in its edition of 14–20 September 1985, accompanied by a photograph of the actor as his character in the programme, stating: "Filmed in Hampshire and North Wales, this vision of a bleak future is set in the year 2020 after Britain has been devastated by civil war." There were two directors credited to the serial, Andrew Morgan (episodes 1, 4, 5, 8, 9, 12 and 13) and Michael Kerrigan (episodes 2, 3, 6, 7, 10 and 11), and the executive producer was Anna Home. Music for the series was composed by Christopher Gunning.

== Broadcast history and home video releases ==
The serial received its only UK transmission in the autumn of 1987, two years after it was made. By the time it was broadcast, both Troughton and Nigel Stock – who plays an old ally of Mordrin's – had died. It was Troughton's last transmitted role - his last filmed or recorded role had been an episode of Super Gran filmed a week before his death back in the previous March.

The serial was shown in France by Canal Plus from 7 October to 30 December 1987, under the title Les Épées de feu ("The Swords of Fire"), and subsequently repeated on La Cinq and FR3.

A subtitled 238 minute version of the serial was released over two VHS tapes (118m & 120m) in Denmark, Finland, and Greece as The Knights of God. A single-tape German-dubbed 199 minute compilation was released on VHS in Switzerland as 2019 – Die Gnadenlosen Knechte Gottes ("2019 – The Merciless Warriors of God"); it was re-released as a limited edition DVD in Austria in 2020. A single-tape dubbed 148 minute version was released in Spain as Los Caballeros De Dios – Año 2020 (The Knights of God – Year 2020).

There has been no domestic commercial release of the series on any format in the UK. This is probably due to ongoing complex rights issues after the production company, TVS, lost its ITV franchise in 1992 and subsequently went through a number of take-overs. This problem affects the majority of the TVS programme archive, since much of the original production paperwork and sales documentation has been lost during the intervening years.

== See also ==
- List of stories set in a future now in the past
