= Gareth Thomas (actor) =

Welsh actor (1945–2016)

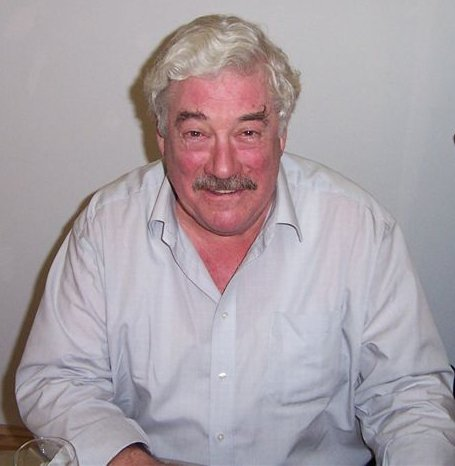
- Gareth Thomas at the Blake's 7 DVD launch, 2005
- Born: Gareth Daniel Noake Thomas; 12 February 1945; Brentford, England
- Died: 13 April 2016 (aged 71); Surrey, England
- Education: Royal Academy of Dramatic Art
- Occupation: Actor
- Years active: 1965–2013
- Known for: Blake's 7

Gareth Daniel Noake Thomas (12 February 1945 – 13 April 2016) was a Welsh actor. He rose to national prominence playing the role of Roj Blake in the BBC science fiction television series Blake's 7 (1978–1981).

== Early life ==
Thomas was born on 12 February 1945 in Brentford, England, and grew up in Aberystwyth, Wales. He was the younger of two sons of Kenneth Thomas, a barrister who had been a junior at the Nuremberg trials, and his wife, Olga (née Noake). Thomas attended the King's School, Canterbury. He then trained at RADA and later became an Associate Member. He was a member of the National Youth Theatre, appearing with them in the 1967 production of Zigger Zagger.

== Career ==
Thomas made many television appearances, including The Avengers, Coronation Street, Z-Cars, Special Branch, Sutherland's Law, Public Eye, Who Pays the Ferryman?, Bergerac, By the Sword Divided, The Citadel, Knights of God, Boon, London's Burning, Casualty, Taggart, Heartbeat, Sherlock Holmes, How Green Was My Valley, Torchwood, Children of the Stones, Star Maidens, and Midsomer Murders.

Thomas appeared on stage in many productions, including RSC productions of Twelfth Night, Othello and Anna Christie; English Shakespeare Company productions of Henry IV, Part 1 and Part 2 and Henry V; and King Lear, Educating Rita, Cat on a Hot Tin Roof, The Crucible, Equus and Déjà Vu. In 2000, Thomas was the first subject of MJTV's interview/drama CD series The Actor Speaks. In one of the interviews he spoke about his character Roj Blake, leader of the crew of the Liberator in Blake's 7. From 1999 to 2005, he took part in 12 out of 14 CD episodes of MJTV's original audio comedy sci-fi drama series Soldiers of Love, in which he played camp Welsh TV host Hywel Hammond and villain of the piece Aaron Arkenstein. In 2010, Thomas gave an acclaimed performance as Ephraim Cabot in Desire Under the Elms at the New Vic Theatre.

In 2001, Thomas appeared in Storm Warning, an audio drama by Big Finish Productions, based on Doctor Who. He also played the part of Kalendorf in the Big Finish Productions Dalek Empire series. In 2006 he appeared as a guest star in the Doctor Who spin-off series Torchwood, in the episode "Ghost Machine". Thomas returned to the role of Roj Blake in 2012, in Big Finish Productions' Blake's 7: The Liberator Chronicles, a series of dramatic readings which take place during Series One before the death of Olag Gan. Thomas starred as Blake in Counterfeit by Peter Anghelides and False Positive by Eddie Robson. In 2013 he appeared as Brother Cadfael in Middle Ground Theatre Company's adaption of The Virgin in the Ice by Ellis Peters. He was twice nominated for a BAFTA, for his performances in Stocker's Copper (BBC Play for Today, 1972) and Morgan's Boy (1984).

Morgan's Boy was Thomas' favourite television role, but Blake's 7 won bigger audiences.

== Personal life ==
Thomas had two children with his first wife, Annie; this marriage ended in divorce. His second wife, Sheelagh Wells, was a make-up artist who had worked on Blakes 7; this marriage also ended in divorce. His third wife was Linda. After many years living in the Scottish Borders, he moved to Surrey in 2009.

== Death ==
Thomas died in Surrey on 13 April 2016 of heart failure, aged 71. His Blake's 7 co-star Stephen Greif paid tribute, saying he was "very sad to hear of the death of my good friend Gareth Thomas. We were at RADA then Blake's 7 and onwards. He was a proud Welshman."

== Filmography ==
=== Film ===
Year	Title	Role	Notes
1967	Quatermass and the Pit	Workman	British science fiction horror film directed by Roy Ward Baker.
1972	The Ragman's Daughter	Tom	Crime–drama romantic film directed by Harold Becker.
1973	Super Bitch	Trenchcoated Detective	(Italian: Si può essere più bastardi dell'ispettore Cliff?, lit. Can anyone be more bastard than Inspector Cliff?) Italian directed by Massimo Dallamano.
1974	Juggernaut	Liverpool Joiner	Crime suspense film directed by Richard Lester.
1992	Waterland	Publican	American-British drama film directed by Stephen Gyllenhaal
1993	Sparrow	Corrado	(Italian: Storia di una capinera) Italian drama film directed by Franco Zeffirelli.
2003	Hamlet	King Claudius	
2008	Imaginary Summer	Starring role	Drama film directed by Rebecca Coley.
2010	Made in Romania	Gary Devane	Comedy film directed, produced, and written by Guy J. Louthan.

=== Television ===
Year	Title	Role	Notes
1965	Romeo and Juliet	Benvolio	Made-for-TV-Movie
1967	The Avengers	Assassin	Episode: "Murdersville" (S 5:Ep 23)
1969	The Wednesday Play	Doorman	Episode: "The Apprentices" (Ep 137)
1969	Parkin's Patch	Ron Radley	Recurring from 1969 to 1970
1971	Coronation Street	Mel Ryan	Episode: "Wed 2 Jun, 1971"
1971	Z-Cars	Tim Ward	Episode: "The Taker" (S 5:Ep 410)
1971	Public Eye	Briggs	Episode: "The Man Who Didn't Eat Sweets: (S 5:9)
1972	Play for Today	Herbert Griffith	Episode: "Stocker's Copper" (S 2:Ep 12)
1972	No Exit	Matthew	Episode: "A Man's Fair Share Of Days" (S 1:Ep 3)
1972	Drama Playhouse	Alec Duthie	Episode: "Sutherland's Law: Man Overboard" (S 3:Ep 1)
1972	Z-Cars	Ken Knowles	Episode: "Public Relations" (S 7:Ep 83)
1972	Public Eye	Tom Lewis	Episode: "The Bankrupt" (S 6:Ep 1)
1972	Man at the Top	Dave Croxley	Episode: "You Will Never Understand Women" (S 2:Ep 1)
1972	Harriet's Back in Town	Chauffeur	Recurring
1973	Sutherland's Law	Alec Duthie	Main
1974	David Copperfield	Mr. Murdstone	Miniseries
1974	Special Branch	Steve Ryman	Episode: "Alien" (S 4:Ep 11)
1975	Play for Today	Guest	Episode: "Breath" (S 5:Ep 10)
1975	Edward the Seventh	Lord Charles Beresford	Episodes: "Dearest Prince" (S 1:Ep 7); "Scandal" (S 1:Ep 10)
1975	How Green Was My Valley	Rev. Mr. Gruffyd	Recurring from 1975 to 1976
1976	Jackanory	Narrator	Recurring
1976	Star Maidens	Shem	Recurring
1977	Children of the Stones	Adam Brake	Recurring
1977	Who Pays the Ferryman?	Tony Viglis	Miniseries
1978–1981	Blake's 7	Roj Blake	Main
1980	Hammer House of Horror	Constable	Episode: "Visitor from the Grave" (S 1:Ep 11)
1981	Peter and Paul	Julius	Miniseries directed by Robert Day.
1982	The Bell	James Tayper Pace	Recurring
1983	Bergerac	Towers	Episode: "Clap Hands, Here Comes Charlie" (S 2:Ep 3)
1983	The Citadel	Philip Denny	Miniseries directed by Peter Jefferies and Mike Vardy.
1983	Shades of Darkness	Owen Bosworth	Episode: "Bewitched" (S 1:Ep 7)
1984	Love and Marriage	Stephen	Episode: "Dearly Beloved" (S 1:Ep 2)
1984	The Adventures of Sherlock Holmes	Joseph Harrison	Episode: "The Naval Treaty" (S 1:Ep 3)
1984	Strangers and Brothers	Arthur Mounteney	Episodes: "Episode #1.8" (S 1:Ep 8); "Episode #1.9" (S 1:Ep 10)
1984	Morgan's Boy	Morgan Thomas	Recurring
1985	By the Sword Divided	Major General Horton	Recurring
1985	Dramarama	Long John Silver	Episode: Silver" (S 3:Ep 11)
1985	Duel with An Teallach	Charles Handley	Made-for-TV-Movie
1987	Knights of God	Owen Edwards	Recurring
1988	Tales of the Unexpected	Telfer	Episode: "The Colonel's Lady" (S 9:Ep 2)
1989	Boon	Bill Stone	Episode: "Walking off Air" (S 5:Ep 1)
1989	London's Burning	ACO William Bulstrode	Recurring from 1989 to 1994
1989	After the War	Guy Falcon	Miniseries
1989	Chelworth	Peter Thornton	Miniseries
1990	Emlyn's Moon	Mr. Llewelyn	Recurring
1991	We Are Seven	Big Bill Caradog	
1991	The Chestnut Soldier	Idris Llewelyn	Recurring
1992	Maigret	Gautier	Episode: "Maigret on Home Ground" (S 1:Ep 5)
1994	Medics	Guest	Episode: "Going West" (S 4:Ep 10)
1994	Crown Prosecutor	Harry Thomsen	Episode: "Episode 3" (S 1:Ep 3)
1995	Crown Prosecutor	Harry Thomsen	Episode: "Episode 4" (S 1:Ep 4)
1995	Casualty	Tom Arnold	Episode: "Bringing It All Back Home" (S 10:Ep 12)
1995	Wales Playhouse	Flann	Episode: "Archangel Night Out" S(#:Ep 5)
1996	The Witch's Daughter	Dan Mackay	Made-for-TV-Movie directed by Alan Macmillan.
1998	Merlin: The Quest Begins	Blaze	Made-for-TV-Movie directed by David Winning.
1998	The Creatives	Policeman	Episode: "Pocy Pola" (S 1:Ep 3)
1998	Animal Ark	Mr. Matthews	Episode: "Calf in the Cottage" (S 2:Ep 5)
1998	Heartbeat	Nathaniel Clegghorn	Recurring from 1998 to 2004
2000	The Strangerers	Police Sergeant	Episode: "Space Cadets" (S 1:Ep 1–Pilot)
2000	Randall and Hopkirk	Dickie Bechard	Episode: (S 1:Ep 6)
2001	Baddiel's Syndrome	David's Dad	Episode: "Dream Home" (S 1:Ep 10)
2001	Baddiel's Syndrome	Colin	Episodes: "Dead Grandma" (S 1:Ep 2); "Religious Uncertainty" (S 1:Ep 13)
2001	Doctors	Les Simms	Episode: "Chip Off The Old Block" (S 4:Ep 18)
2002	Shipman	Rev Denis Thomas	Made-for-TV-Movie directed by Roger Bamford.
2002	Casualty	Jim Bailey	Episode: "Up To Your Neck In It" (S 17:Ep 11)
2003–2010	Raven	Voice of Wisdom Tree	
2004	Taggart	Lord Falkland	Episode: "Saints and Sinners" (S 20:Ep 4)
2005	Distant Shores	Charles McCallister	Recurring from 2005 to 2008
2006	Torchwood	Ed Morgan	Episode: "Ghost Machine" (S 1:Ep 3)
2007	Midsomer Murders	Huw Mostyn	Episode: "Death and Dust" (S 10:Ep 5)
2008	M.I. High	Patrick Houston	Episode: "Moontaker" (S 3:Ep 13)
2009	Personal Affairs	Leo Hartmann	Episode: (S 1:Ep 5)
2011	Holby City	Gareth Harper	Episode: "Shame" (S 14:Ep 3)

== Theatre ==
Year	Title	Role	Notes
1968	King Lear	Messenger 1	Royal Shakespeare Theatre
1968	As You Like It		Royal Shakespeare Theatre
1968	Doctor Faustus	Scholar 2 / Vintner	Royal Shakespeare Theatre
1968	Troilus and Cressida	Margarelon / Prologue (alt)	Royal Shakespeare Theatre
1968	Much Ado About Nothing		Royal Shakespeare Theatre
1968-9	Much Ado About Nothing		Royal Shakespeare Theatre
1968-9	King Lear		Royal Shakespeare Company
1969	Much Ado About Nothing		Tour – Royal Shakespeare Company
1969	Doctor Faustus	Scholar 2 / Vintner	Tour – Royal Shakespeare Company
1979	Twelfth Night	Orsino	Royal Shakespeare Theatre
1979	Othello	Montano	Royal Shakespeare Theatre
1979	Anna Christie	Mat Burke	The Other Place
1979–80	Anna Christie	Mat Burke	Royal Shakespeare Company
1980	Othello	Cassio	Theatre Royal
1980	Anna Christie	Mat Burke	Gulbenkian Studio, Newcastle-upon-Tyne
1980	Twelfth Night	Orsino	Theatre Royal
1980	Twelfth Night	Orsino	Aldwych Theatre
1980	Anna Christie	Mat Burke	Warehouse Theatre
1980	Othello	Cassio	Aldwych Theatre
1983	Educating Rita	Frank	Theatre Royal
1985	Beside the Sea	Arnold	Theatre Royal
1985-6	Benefactors	Colin	Theatre Royal
1986	Benefactors	Colin	Redgrave Theatre
1986-7	Henry IV		Theatre Royal
1986-7	Henry V	Lord Chief Justice/Fluellen	Tour – UK & Europe, The Old Vic and other locations
1986-7	Henry IV, Parts I & II	Owen Glendower/Lord Chief Justice	Tour – UK & Europe, The Old Vic and other locations
1988	Dangerous Corner	Charles Stanton	Theatre Royal
1989	Inside Job	Alex	Theatre Royal
1991-2	Dij`vu		Comedy Theatre
1998	The Crucible	Deputy Governor Danforth	Festival Theatre, Marlowe Theatre and other locations
2002	Three Sisters	Doctor Chebutykin	Nuffield Theatre
2008	Of Mice and Men	Curly	Perth Theatre
