= The Bruce (film) =

- Directed by: Bob Carruthers; David McWhinnie
- Screenplay by: Bob Carruthers
- Produced by: Bob Carruthers David McWhinnie
- Starring: Brian Blessed; Richard Brimblecombe; Pavel Douglas; Dee Hepburn; Debbie Morgan
- Cinematography: Chris Weaver
- Edited by: Owen Parker
- Music by: Gordon Dougall; Paul Farrer
- Production company: Cromwell Productions, Ltd.
- Distributed by: Prime Time Entertainment
- Release date: 12 April 1996
- Running time: 107 minutes
- Country: United Kingdom
- Language: English
- Budget: $500,000.00

The Bruce is a 1996 medieval historical film set in Scotland and England. The film focuses primarily on the rise to power of Robert I of Scotland, culminating in the Battle of Bannockburn in AD 1314.

This film was directed by Bob Carruthers and David McWhinnie. Parts of the film were shot at Craigmillar Castle in Edinburgh, and at Peebles in the Scottish Borders.

== Cast ==
- Sandy Welch as Robert I of Scotland
- Oliver Reed as Robert Wishart
- Brian Blessed as Edward I of England
- Richard Brindlecombe as Edward II of England
- Pavel Douglas as John III Comyn, Lord of Badenoch
- Hildegarde Neil as Eleanor of Castile
- Michael Van Wijk as Henry de Bohun
- Dee Hepburn as Mary Bruce
- Ronnie Browne as Maxwell
- Barrie Ingham as Gloucester
- Jake D'Arcy as Chief MacKenzie
- Debbie Morgan as Child Pauper

== Reception ==
The film received generally poor to mixed responses. Empire gave the film one star out of five, criticising the film's battle scenes, calling them "lacklustre and unimpressive" and "unconvincing and downright laughable".
