= Charles Endell Esquire =

British TV drama series (1979–1980)

- Created by: Robert Banks Stewart
- Directed by: Gerry Mill
- Starring: Iain Cuthbertson; Annie Ross; Tony Osoba; Rikki Fulton
- Country of origin: United Kingdom
- Original language: English
- No. of seasons: 1
- No. of episodes: 6

Production
- Executive producer: Bryan Izzard
- Producer: Rex Firkin
- Running time: 50 mins.
- Production company: Scottish Television

Original release
- Network: ITV

Charles Endell Esquire is a British comedy-drama series that is a spin-off of the series Budgie, with the role of Endell continuing to be played by Iain Cuthbertson. Due to an ITV technicians' strike which took the network completely off the air for three months, the first two episodes were broadcast in 1979 and the remaining episodes were not aired until a full repeat of the series began on 26 April 1980 on almost all ITV regions, except Southern Television (which started it on 1 May 1980) and Westward Television (which never broadcast the series). Only six episodes were made.

== Plot ==
Charles Endell was sent to prison for ten years after the last episode of Budgie. The show starts with Charlie Endell returning to his native Glasgow after serving seven years (with three off for good behaviour). He plans to re-establish himself in Glasgow after his former business empire in London was broken up by the vice squad.

Back in Glasgow, he visits his solicitor, Archibald Telfer, to acquire his "rainy day" cash. Archibald Telfer apparently dies and the money disappears, but Charlie is convinced that the death has been faked.

=== Episode list ===
- 1: Glasgow Belongs To Me
- 2: As One Door Closes Another Slams in Your Face
- 3: Slaughter on Piano Street
- 4: The Moon Shines Bright on Charlie Endell.
- 5: Stuff Me a Flamingo
- 6: If You Can't Join 'Em, Beat 'Em

=== Cast ===
- Charles Endell Esq – Iain Cuthbertson
- Hamish McIntyre Jr – Tony Osoba
- Alastair Vint – Rikki Fulton
- Det Sgt Dickson – Phil McCall
- Janet – Julie Ann Fullarton
- Kate Moncrieff – Rohan McCullough
- Dixie – Annie Ross

== DVD release ==
A DVD of the series was planned for release on 22 February 2016, with a 12 certificate rating. The release would soon be cancelled, with the distributor opting instead for a digital download release at £4.99 per episode.
