= My Heart's in the Highlands =

1789 song and poem by Robert Burns

- by Robert Burns
- Country: Scotland
- Language: English
- Meter: or
- Publisher: 1789

"My Heart's in the Highlands" is a 1789 song and poem by Robert Burns, sung to the tune "Fàilte na Miosg".

1:

My heart's in the Highlands, my heart is not here,
My heart's in the Highlands, a-chasing the deer;
Chasing the wild-deer, and following the roe,
My heart's in the Highlands, wherever I go.

2:

Farewell to the Highlands, farewell to the North,
The birth-place of Valour, the country of Worth;
Wherever I wander, wherever I rove,
The hills of the Highlands forever I'll love.

(Chorus:)

My heart's in the Highlands, my heart is not here,
My heart's in the Highlands, a-chasing the deer;
Chasing the wild-deer, and following the roe,
My heart's in the Highlands, wherever I go.

3:

Farewell to the mountains, high-cover'd with snow,
Farewell to the straths and green valleys below;
Farewell to the forests and wild-hanging woods,
Farewell to the torrents and loud-pouring floods.

(Chorus:)

My heart's in the Highlands my heart is not here,
My heart's in the Highlands, a-chasing the deer;
Chasing the wild-deer, and following the roe,
My heart's in the Highlands, wherev'r I go
My heart's in the Highlands, farewell.

== Compositions ==
"My Heart's in the Highlands" has been arranged for countertenor (alto) and organ by Arvo Pärt.

"My Heart's in the Highlands" was also arranged for lyre and guitar by Scottish ambient folk artist An Tuagh (Jamie Keddie).
