= Battlefield (American TV series) =

- Written by: Dave Flitton
- Directed by: Dave Flitton
- Theme music composer: David Galbraith
- Country of origin: United Kingdom
- Original language: British English
- No. of seasons: 6
- No. of episodes: 42

Production
- Producers: Andy Aitken, Justin McCarthy
- Production locations: Edinburgh, Scotland
- Running time: 100 minutes
- Production company: Lamancha Productions

Original release
- Network: PBS
- Release: 1994 – 2002

Battlefield is a series produced by Lamancha Productions in Edinburgh, Scotland, which debuted on the American PBS channel in 1994. The series explored battles fought during the Second World War and the Vietnam War, with detailed accounts of major battles and background and contextual information. Its sixth and final season was broadcast in 2002.

== Production ==
Each episode describes the events preceding the featured battle and provides details about its aftermath. It presents the political and military situation leading up to each battle, details about relevant weapons and tactics, analysis of the battle's cause, and its context in the war as a whole with maps and graphical depictions of the relative strength of the respective forces and their movements during the battle.

The series, narrated by Tim Pigott-Smith and produced by Lamancha Productions in Edinburgh, Scotland, contains archival footage and 3D graphics. Rare colour footage, specific to each battle, is often included. Each episode runs for about 100 minutes, and is divided into segments. The format of a typical episode is:

- Episode title (overview)
- Prelude to Battle
- The Leaders
- Strategy for Offense
- Strategy for Defense
- The Commanders
- The Opposing Forces
- Weapons
- The Men
- The Eve of Battle
- The Battle: Order of battle and several phases
- The Battle Won
- After the Battle

Later series were narrated by Jonathan Booth.

== Episodes ==
=== Season 1 (1994) ===
No. overall	No. in season	Title
1	1	"The Battle of France"
2	2	"The Battle of Britain"
3	3	"The Battle of Midway"
4	4	"The Battle of Stalingrad"
5	5	"The Battle of Normandy"
6	6	"The Battle of Berlin"

=== Season 2 (1996) ===
No. overall	No. in season	Title
7	1	"The Battle for North Africa"
8	2	"The Battle of the Atlantic"
9	3	"The Battle for Russia"
10	4	"The Battle for Italy"
11	5	"The Battle of Leyte Gulf"
12	6	"The Battle for the Rhine"

=== Season 3 (1999) – 'Vietnam' ===
No. overall	No. in season	Title
13	1	"Dien Bien Phu – The Legacy"
14	2	"The Undeclared War"
15	3	"Search and Destroy"
16	4	"The Showdown in the Iron Triangle"
17	5	"Countdown to Tet"
18	6	"The Tet Offensive"
19	7	"War on the DMZ"
20	8	"Siege at Khe Sanh"
21	9	"Air War Vietnam"
22	10	"Rolling Thunder"
23	11	"Peace with Honor"
24	12	"The Fall of Saigon"

=== Season 4 (2000) ===
No. overall	No. in season	Title
25	1	"Operation Citadel - Kursk"
26	2	"Air War Over Germany"
27	3	"Manchuria: The Forgotten Victory"
28	4	"Pearl Harbor"
29	5	"Guadalcanal"
30	6	"The Siege of Leningrad"

=== Season 5 (2001) ===
No. overall	No. in season	Title
31	1	"Tunisia"
32	2	"El Alamein"
33	3	"The Battle for Monte Cassino"
34	4	"The West Wall"
35	5	"Operation Market Garden"
36	6	"The Battle for Caen"

=== Season 6 (2002) ===
No. overall	No. in season	Title
37	1	"The Battle for the Crimea"
38	2	"Scandinavia - The Forgotten Front"
39	3	"The War Against the U-Boats"
40	4	"Destination Okinawa"
41	5	"Campaign in the Balkans"
42	6	"The Battle for the Mediterranean"

== Broadcast history ==
Battlefield originally aired in the United States on PBS. The Military Channel showed a shorter version of the series. Networks still showing documentaries from the Battlefield series include Discovery Networks Europe in the UK and PBS in the US.

== Home video ==
Battlefield series-one VHS set

=== Season 1 release ===
Battlefield was released on VHS by PolyGram Video (UK - PAL format) and Time-Life (US - NTSC format). DVD collections were released by PolyGram Video in the UK (PAL format) in 2005. In 2010, the original series was released on DVD in the US.

- Release date: 5 Feb 2005
- Format: PAL, six two-hour episodes on six DVDs
- Running Time: 11 hours 10 minutes
- Narrator - Tim Pigott-Smith
- Executive Producers - David Rozalla, Ken Maliphant
- Producer - Dave Flitton
- Directors - Dave Flitton, Andy Aitken, Justin McCarthy

=== Season 2 release ===
- Release date: 5 Feb 2005
- Format: PAL
- Number of Discs: 6
- Running Time: 300 minutes

=== Season 4 release ===
Season four, narrated by Gavin MacFadyen, was released by Time-Life on DVD as 12 episodes, 60 minutes each, splitting each originally-aired episode in half; episode one, "Kursk", was split into two episodes: "Operation Citadel" and "The Battle for Kharkov".

== Reception ==
According to the Journal of Strategic Studies, "Every department of politics or modern history should invest in this set, and use it".
