= Line of Fire (2002 TV series) =

2002 American documentary series

- Genre: Documentary
- Country of origin: United States
- Original language: English
- No. of series: 4
- No. of episodes: 49, 13 per series Note: some of the episodes listed are actually from the show: Line of Fire (2003 TV series).

Production
- Running time: 50 minutes

Original release
- Release: 2000 UK\US, 2002 History Channel

Line of Fire is a film documentary produced by Cromwell Productions that shows historical battlefields presented in an animated environment. It ran between 2000 and 2002 in the UK\US and in 2002 and 2004 on the History Channel.

== Episode list ==
1. . Agincourt 1415
2. . Ancient Conquerors: Genghis Khan
3. . Ancient Conquerors: The Spartan Wars
4. . Arnhem 1944
5. . Austerlitz 1815
6. . Balaclava 1854
7. . Bannockburn - 1314
8. . Battle For Berlin - 1945
9. . Battle for Berlin: 1944
10. . Battle For Port Stanley
11. . Battle of The Bulge - 1944
12. . Borodino 1812
13. . Caesar - Conqueror of Gaul
14. . Cambrai 1917
15. . Culloden 1746
16. . Disaster for Athens
17. . Edgehill 1642
18. . El Alamein 1942
19. . Gallipoli 1915
20. . Genghis Khan: Mongol Conqueror
21. . Gettysburg 1863
22. . Goose Green 1982
23. . Hannibal's Great Triumph
24. . Hastings 1066
25. . Marathon 490BC
26. . Marston Moor, 1644
27. . Mons 1914
28. . Monte Cassino 1944
29. . Naseby 1645
30. . Normandy: 1944
31. . Port Stanley 1982
32. . Ramses: Warrior Pharaoh
33. . Rorke's Drift 1879
34. . Stalingrad - 1942
35. . The Battle for Britain
36. . The Battle for Normandy
37. . The Battle of El Alemein
38. . The Battle of Stalingrad
39. . The Conquests of Alexander
40. . The Gulf War
41. . The Kaiser's Battle 1918
42. . The Roman Conquests
43. . The Roman Conquests of Britain
44. . The Six Day War
45. . The Somme - 1916
46. . The Third Crusade 1189-1192
47. . Trafalgar 1815
48. . Viking! The Norse Raiders
49. . Waterloo - 1815

== See also ==
1. Bob Carruthers
2. Line of Fire (2003 TV series)
