= History of Blake's 7 =

This article is specifically about the production history of the television series Blake's 7: for a more general overview of this series, please see the main Blake's 7 article.

Blake's 7 is a British science fiction television programme that was produced by the BBC for its station BBC1. Set in the far future, Blake's 7 follows the fortunes of a group of rebels in their fight against the dictatorial Terran Federation. Four thirteen-episode series were produced between 1978 and 1981. Blake's 7 was created by Terry Nation, who later described it as "The Dirty Dozen in space". David Maloney was assigned to produce the series and Chris Boucher was appointed as the script editor. Gareth Thomas was cast as the eponymous Blake. The series' budget was severely restricted, which limited the scope for visual effects.

Nation wrote the first 13-episode series and contributed a further six scripts in the second and third series. Twelve additional writers provided material for the series. After three successful series, Blake's 7 was unexpectedly commissioned for a further series. Vere Lorrimer was appointed as producer, and oversaw major changes in its format. Following the dramatic finale of the fourth series, Blake's 7 was not re-commissioned and the programme ended.

== Origins (1975–1976) ==
In 1975, Terry Nation attended a meeting with Ronnie Marsh, the BBC's Head of Serials, to discuss ideas for new television series. Marsh was looking for formats for co-productions with American television channels. Nation suggested a number of ideas, mostly for crime dramas, none of which appealed to Marsh. According to Nation, "...the interview was drawing to a close when I surprised myself by starting to detail a new science fiction adventure [...] 'Have you got a title?' someone asked. Blake's 7 I replied without hesitation." Marsh's notes of the meeting survive and record the pitch Nation made as follows: "cracking Boy's Own/ kidult sci-fi. A space Western adventure. A modern swashbuckler. Blake's Seven. Group of villains being escorted onto a rocket ship (transported) which goes astray and lands on an alien planet, where inhabitants are planning to invade and destroy Earth. Possibly live underground." Nation left the meeting with a commission for a pilot script and "...the bewildered feeling that [...] I could not trace the source of the idea". Nation submitted his pilot script, titled "Blake's 7 – A Television Series created by Terry Nation", in April 1976, sub-titling the draft episode Cygnus Alpha.

Nation's pilot script broadly resembled what would become The Way Back, the first episode of Blake's 7 to be transmitted, although the agent who betrays Glyd's group and plots Blake's conviction was named Cral Travis, rather than Dev Tarrant in the transmitted episode. The proposed characters for the series were: Rog (later changed to Roj) Blake, Vila Restal, Jenna Stannis, Kerr Avon, Olag Gan, Arco Trent, Tone Selman and Brell Klein. The descriptions of Blake, Jenna and Gan are similar to those of the developed characters. However, Vila's character is somewhat different, described as "thirty five, a good-looking athletic", he appeared more similar to the popular fictional character Simon Templar than the Vila portrayed on screen. The character of Arco Trent was described as a powerful figure in the Administration who had become a scapegoat for a group of corrupt officials involved in arms dealing. Arco would plot against Blake but would gain respect for him after Blake saves his life. Arco's sidekick would be Avon, a self-serving, treacherous coward. The characters of Selman and Klein did not appear in the pilot script, which noted that these characters would join the series in a later episode.

Marsh asked Nation for a draft script for a second episode of Blake's 7 in June 1976. Two months later, Nation delivered Space Fall, in which the spacecraft Liberator was introduced. On 12 November, Marsh commissioned Space Fall and confirmed the series for full development. Marsh asked Nation to deliver a further five scripts. It was intended that 13 episodes of Blake's 7 would be produced to replace the police drama Softly, Softly: Taskforce. Nation would write the first seven episodes, the following four would be written by other writers and Nation would write a two-part finale. Blake's 7 now officially entered production.

== Series One (1977–1978) ==
The Blake's 7 cast in Series One (1978): Michael Keating (Vila); Jan Chappell (Cally); Gareth Thomas (Blake); Sally Knyvette (Jenna); Paul Darrow (Avon) and David Jackson (Gan). Zen is behind.

The BBC chose David Maloney to produce Blake's 7 because of his experience with Doctor Who. Maloney approached Robert Holmes, as a script editor. Holmes declined, as he was script editing Doctor Who, but he recommended Chris Boucher, who had previously written three scripts for Doctor Who.

Early in 1977, Nation was commissioned to write four more episodes for Series One and five episodes for Series Two. He was now contracted to write all thirteen episodes of the first series. The BBC had expanded Nation's writing commitment in order that Nation's high-profile would help the promotion of the series. Providing a large amount of material in a short time would prove difficult for Nation. Admitting that he had agreed to write every episode out of "ego and supreme confidence", Nation later recalled that he returned home following the commission and told his wife, "I think I've got myself into deep trouble!" Nation informed Boucher that he would only be able to deliver the first draft of each script, telling Boucher, "...you can have rewrites or you can have the next episode: which do you want?" As a result, while Nation created the plots, Boucher provided a great deal of input into the characters and dialogue. According to Boucher, "Terry came up with the characters, he came up with thirteen good stories, but he didn't come up with the dialogue. I remember saying, and I think it's pretty close to the truth, that for a long time, Paul Darrow [playing Avon] never spoke a line that I hadn't written or altered to make the lines sharper."

The strain of writing all thirteen episodes was starting to affect Nation. His tenth script – The Invaders, in which Gan would fight an alien duplicate of himself intent on taking over the Liberator – was abandoned and replaced by a script titled Brain Drain (later renamed Breakdown) which partially re-used some elements of The Invaders. Nation later recalled: "During those thirteen weeks, I ran entirely out of ideas, and I'd sit around and walk for days, saying, 'There are no more ideas, that's it! I've shot it all and it's gone'." One episode badly affected by Nation's difficulties was Bounty; even after Boucher had rewritten it, director Pennant Roberts was required to lengthen the scenes to fill the fifty-minute running time.

=== Script and character alterations ===
One script was abandoned early; Locate and Destroy was originally planned as the fourth episode. This story would have re-introduced the character Travis, first seen in the pilot script, now with a mechanical arm and an eye patch. Travis would be ordered by his superior officer, "Commander Shervalan", to recapture Blake. This script's plot elements would later be used in the episodes Duel, Mission to Destiny and Deliverance. The last of these centred on Travis attacking the Liberator while Jenna was captured by primitives living on a planet ravaged by a biological weapon released by the Federation. Travis was later renamed Dev Tarrant in the opening episode The Way Back; the Travis that appeared from Seek-Locate-Destroy onwards was a new character, while "Commander Shervalan" became female and was renamed Servalan.

The characters of Trent, Selman and Klein were removed from the series, although Trent and Selman appeared as Blake's fellow prisoners and were then killed in the broadcast version of Cygnus Alpha. These characters were removed in order to control costs and to give the remaining characters more work. Blake's 7 would now comprise Blake himself; Avon, who acquired the scheming nature of Arco Trent; Vila, who now acquired the cowardly aspect originally planned for Avon; Jenna; Gan; Zen, the Liberator computer; and a new character: the telepathic alien, Cally, who was added to balance the gender mix among the cast. This character had similarities to that of Doctor Who companion Leela – created by Boucher, who was inspired by the Palestinian hijacker Leila Khaled. Stevens and Moore speculate that Boucher had a large part in the creation of Cally, whose skin and hair were to be coloured red, while coloured contact lenses would be worn by the actress when Cally entered a telepathic trance, giving her a more alien appearance. These ideas were finally abandoned to reduce costs and save time.

=== Casting and production staff ===
Series Created by		Terry Nation
Script Editor		Chris Boucher
Producers		David Maloney (Series 1–3); Vere Lorrimer (Series 4)
Theme music		Dudley Simpson

Series 1 Production Personnel
Designers		Martin Collins; Roger Murray-Leach; Robert Berk; Chris Pemsel; Peter Brachaki
Production Unit Manager		Sheelagh Rees
Costume Designers		Barbara Lane; Rupert Jarvis
Make-up Artists		Marianne Ford; Eileen Mair
Film Editors		M.A.C. Adams; Martin Sharpe; John S. Smith
Videotape Editors		Sam Upton; Malcolm Banthorpe
Film Cameraman		Ken Willacombe
Film Recordists		Bill Meekums; John K. Murphy; Andrew Boulton; Graham Hare; John Gatland
Studio Lighting		Brian Clemett
Studio Sound		Clive Gifford
Graphic Designers		Bob Blagden; Ron Platford
Visual Effects Designers		Ian Scoones; Mat Irvine
Special Sound		Richard Yeoman-Clark
Electronic Effects		A.J. Mitchell
Stunt Co-Ordinators		Frank Maher; Peter Brayham; Stuart Fell

In June 1977 the BBC announced to the press that Blake's 7, a "...new and major BBC television series of space adventure" set in the "third century of the second calendar", was in development, stating that 13 episodes would be produced at a cost of £750,000. Casting was now in progress. Gareth Thomas was chosen to play Blake at the suggestion of Terry Nation. Paul Darrow, who had been considered for the part of Blake, was cast as Avon. Michael Keating was suggested for the role of Vila by Pennant Roberts; the pair had worked together on the Doctor Who serial The Sun Makers. David Jackson, who was known to David Maloney from Maloney's acting career, was cast as Gan. While watching Jackson on stage at the Royal Court Theatre, Maloney and Vere Lorrimer noted Jan Chappell, who would be cast as Cally. Sally Knyvette, who had been recommended by director Bill Sellars following her work on the serial Who Pays the Ferryman?, was cast as Jenna. Peter Tuddenham was cast as Zen. Stephen Greif, who was appearing in the BBC sitcom Citizen Smith, was cast as Blake's nemesis, Travis. Ingrid Pitt had originally been considered for the role of Travis' superior, Servalan, but the role went to Jacqueline Pearce.

Three directors – Pennant Roberts, Michael E. Briant and Lennie Mayne – who had directed Doctor Who episodes – were assigned to Blake's 7. The directors would work in rotation, each directing four episodes. Episode seven would be directed by Paul Ciappessoni. Mayne was killed in a boating accident and was replaced by Vere Lorrimer. The eighth episode, Duel, was directed by another Doctor Who veteran, Douglas Camfield.

Maloney assembled the rest of his production team and engaged Roger Murray-Leach, with whom he had worked on the Doctor Who serials Planet of Evil, The Deadly Assassin and The Talons of Weng-Chiang, as production designer. To ensure uniformity of concept, Maloney asked Murray-Leach to design both the interior and exterior of the Liberator spacecraft. Murray-Leach "...turned the ship around, so it was drawn to look as if it were going one way but flew the other way. In fact, if you take the line of flow, the angles go with it to get a sense of speed, and we turned that around so the 'wings' all canted forwards, not backwards". Murray-Leach's role as designer of the ship proved to be contentious with the series' special effects designer, Ian Scoones. Scoones found Murray-Leach's design for the Liberator awkward to mount and film for the scenes of the ship in flight.

=== Filming and broadcast ===
Aware that Star Wars would be released in cinemas across the United Kingdom around the same time as the planned television debut of Blake's 7, Scoones spent the budget he had been allocated for the entire series on Space Fall, the first episode to be recorded but the second to be broadcast. The model filming for this episode, the first piece of filming for the series, took place at Bray Studios on 15 August 1977. Live action filming of Blake's 7 began on 26 September that year at Ealing film studios with scenes set on the spacecraft London for the episode Space Fall. Filming continued at Ealing and on location, and then moved into the studios at BBC Television Centre in November.

The series' animated title sequence was created by Bob Blagden, and was based partially on suggestions given by Nation in his draft pilot script. Nation had envisaged a vast computer that would print out pictures of each of the characters; these would be deposited in a tray marked "Enemies of the State" before the appearance of the title caption. The theme music was written by Dudley Simpson who composed much of the incidental music.

Shortly after recording began, problems with the filming schedule became obvious. Blake's 7 had inherited its production style – a method called strike filming – from the series it was to replace: Softly, Softly: Taskforce. Strike filming involved pre-filming, either on location or at a film studio, immediately before entering rehearsals for the scenes to be recorded in the videotape studios. This method worked well for a series such as Softly, Softly which had minimal pre-filming, few special effects and a large number of standing sets. However, it was unsuitable for Blake's 7. Shooting schedules began to overrun, leading to expensive remounts and to cast members being taken out of rehearsals, either for pre-filming or for remounts of scenes that had not been filmed on schedule. These problems peaked in January 1978 when, in the course of one week, the cast were working on four different episodes for four different directors. Recording was further complicated when Stephen Greif, playing Travis, ruptured his Achilles tendon playing squash and had to be replaced by an extra for the studio scenes for the episode Orac. The recording of the first series of Blake's 7 was completed on 15 March.

The first episode of Blake's 7 was first broadcast on BBC1 on 2 January at 6:00 pm. Subsequent episodes were broadcast on Mondays at 7:15 pm. It would compete against the popular soap opera Coronation Street and sitcoms A Sharp Intake of Breath and Miss Jones and Son on the rival ITV network. Blake's 7 received an average 9.2 million viewers and attaining an average reaction index of 67.

== Series Two (1978–1979) ==
=== Planning ===
Planning for a second series of Blake’s 7 began in January 1978 after three episodes of the first series had been screened. Maloney and Boucher met with Nation and his agent Roger Hancock, to discuss the new series. New writers would be engaged and, although Nation would be consulted on general storylines, he would not be involved in choosing the writers or approving scripts.

A story arc was planned, which would revolve around Blake’s attempt to attack the Federation Supreme Computer Control. This would be located at a place called Storm Mountain which, when attacked by Blake in a mid-series climax, would be discovered to be a decoy. The rest of the series would follow Blake as he sought the real computer control, designated Star One. Travis would be dismissed from the Federation but would continue his vendetta against Blake.

The general plans for the series was outlined in a document titled Blake’s Seven – Series Two – General Notes. This document noted that “...the Federation must be shown to be even more powerful, even more ruthless and even more intelligent.” To show this, the producers decided that one of the main characters would die. Nation, unhappy with Michael Keating’s interpretation of the role, was keen for Vila to be killed. Nation’s view was opposed by Boucher and Maloney because the character was popular with viewers. A commissioned Audience Research Report on the first series had indicated that Avon was the most popular character followed by Blake, Jenna, Vila, Cally and Gan. It is likely that this report influenced the decision to kill Gan.

=== Writing ===
Terry Nation was commissioned to write five episodes for Series Two: episode one, which would resolve the cliffhanger from Series One; episode 6, in which Blake would assault Storm Mountain; episode 10, which would be a stand-alone adventure and episodes 12 and 13, a two-part finale in which Blake would reach Star One and would uncover a plot by aliens to invade the galaxy, forcing Blake to ally himself with the Federation to defeat the aliens. In interviews given by Terry Nation, he suggested that the Daleks, a race of alien villains he had created for Doctor Who, would appear in Blake’s 7, leading to rumours that Nation intended them to be encountered by Blake at Star One.

To assist the new writers, Boucher wrote a General Notes and Baffle Gab Glossary that explained the format of the series, the characters’ backgrounds and outlined the various technical terms – such as ‘spacials’ and ‘teleport’ – that the series employed. Boucher wanted to write for the series and in May 1978 received clearance to write up to three scripts. Robert Holmes, Allan Prior, Roger Parkes and Pip and Jane Baker were commissioned to write the remainder of the episodes. It was intended that Boucher would write episode two, which would re-introduce Travis and Servalan; Holmes would write episode three, which would be an Orac story and Boucher would then provide the fourth episode, which would introduce the Storm Mountain storyline. Pip and Jane Baker’s script, Death Squad, would follow, then Nation’s Storm Mountain story. Boucher’s next script would cover Travis’ court-martial and Prior would write a script centred on a Ugandan-style society. This plan was later revised; Boucher would write episodes two and three, taking the story centred on Orac, while Holmes would write the fourth episode, which would introduce Storm Mountain.

The order in which the episodes were broadcast was rather different. Death Squad by Pip and Jane Baker – in which Blake, Gan and Jenna would infiltrate a Federation facility attempting to create ‘super-soldiers’ by administering drugs to humans, leading to Blake and Gan becoming exposed to the drugs and Jenna being held by Servalan as an inducement for the scientist behind the plan – was abandoned. This was ostensibly on cost grounds, although Boucher had concerns about the quality of the script. The episodes were re-ordered; Horizon, Allan Prior’s ‘Ugandan’ script replaced Death Squad, while Holmes’ script, Killer, became the seventh episode. Pressure Point, Terry Nation’s Storm Mountain script, became the fifth and Trial, the Travis court-martial story, was moved to sixth.

The scripting problems intensified in September 1978 when Nation informed Boucher that he was having problems writing the two-part finale. Nation had made several aborted attempts to write episode twelve and had not begun writing episode thirteen. Nation’s scripts were cancelled and the final two episodes were re-commissioned. Allan Prior was commissioned to write episode twelve, which became The Keeper, while Boucher wrote Star One using Nation’s original outline.

Series 2 Production Personnel
Designers		Sally Hulke; Paul Allen; Mike Porter; Gerry Scott; Steve Brownsey; Ken Ledsham; Ray London
Production Unit Manager		Sheelagh Rees
Costume Designers		June Hudson; Barbara Kidd
Make-up Artists		Marianne Ford; Ann Ailes
Film Editor		Sheila S. Tomlinson
Videotape Editors		Sam Upton; Malcolm Banthorpe
Film Cameramen		Peter Chapman; Max Samett; Paul Godfrey
Film Recordists		Ian Sansom; John Gatland
Studio Lighting		Brian Clemett
Studio Sound		Clive Gifford; Malcolm Johnson
Graphic Designer		Bob Blagden
Visual Effects Designers		Mat Irvine; Peter Pegrum; Andrew Lazell
Model Sequences		Paul V. Wheeler
Special Sound		Richard Yeoman-Clark; Elizabeth Parker
Electronic Effects		A.J. Mitchell
Stunt Co-Ordinators		Frank Maher; Peter Brayham; Leslie Crawford; Stuart Fell

=== Cast and crew changes ===
In Series Two, some cast changes occurred. David Jackson (Gan) was not upset that his character would die because Jackson was given little to do in many episodes. According to Chris Boucher, Jackson once passed him a note with the word ‘four’ written on it. When Boucher queried the note, Jackson explained that ‘four’ was the number of lines he had in that week’s script. It was originally intended that Gan would be killed by a double agent who would then join the Liberator crew as a Federation spy.

Stephen Greif, who had torn an Achilles tendon while playing squash during the filming of the first series, had left to pursue other roles. Brian Croucher was cast to replace Greif in the role of Space Commander Travis. It was decided that Orac would become a regular character. Derek Farr, who had voiced Orac in its debut, was unavailable and Peter Tuddenham, who was already voicing Zen, was engaged to play Orac.

At the end of Series Two, the actors’ 26-episode contracts would expire. Neither Gareth Thomas nor Sally Knyvette wished to return for a third series. Thomas was disappointed not to be allowed to direct a few episodes, and had been offered a role with the Royal Shakespeare Company, and sought an exit of the show. He would return twice – once in the series 3 finale, Terminal, and once more in the final episode of the series, Blake, when his character was killed off. Knyvette, encouraged by Bruce Purchase, a guest actor on The Keeper, wished to study full-time for a Master of Arts degree, studying Chaucer, and sought to leave the show. She did not appear in any further episodes after series 2.

Because of the loss of the titular character, Nation considered introducing a ‘substitute Blake’ character in Countdown, the third story he was scheduled to write that year. It can be speculated that the character of Del Grant, who appears in Countdown, was intended to be this ‘Blake substitute’. The ‘Blake substitute’ also appears in one of the early drafts of Allan Prior’s episode Hostage. While Nation’s original outline for the two-part series finale involved Jenna and Vila being killed, Boucher was aware that Gan’s death had upset some viewers, and chose to have Blake and Jenna disappear from the narrative between the end of Star One and the opening story of Series Three. Travis was killed at the end of Star One, having no Blake upon whom to focus his vendetta against the Liberator crew.

The only director to return for Series Three was Vere Lorrimer. The other directors appointed were George Spenton-Foster, Jonathan Wright Miller and Derek Martinus. Because of the difficulties caused by the use of strike filming, Series Two was recorded using block filming. This filming method involved a month of location filming for the first six episodes before the studio videotape recording of those episodes, each director being assigned to work on two episodes. The process was repeated for the next six episodes and the final episode would be recorded on its own.

=== Filming and broadcast ===
Filming on Series Two began on Monday 31 July 1978 at Oldbury-on-Severn nuclear power station near Bristol and finished on Thursday 8 March 1979. The recording of the episode Hostage was complicated when guest actor Duncan Lamont died between the location and studio recordings. Lamont was initially replaced by Ronald Lewis, who proved to be unsuitable for health reasons and was quickly replaced by John Abineri. Vere Lorrimer was unavailable for the recording of Star One, so David Maloney replaced him but was not credited because of rules forbidding producers to direct their own programmes.

Redemption, the opening episode of Series Two, was broadcast on Tuesday, 9 January 1979 at 7:20 pm with subsequent episodes following at about the same time each Tuesday. Pressure Point was broadcast at 8:10 pm because of coverage of the Variety Club Awards. Competition on ITV came from the popular US programme Charlie's Angels. BBC Wales opted out of transmission, broadcast regional programming instead and showed Blake's 7 on Sunday afternoons. Ratings averaged 7 million; although two million lower than the previous series, a third series was assured.

== Series Three (1979–1980) ==
The Blake's 7 cast in Series Three (1980): Steven Pacey (Tarrant); Josette Simon (Dayna); Michael Keating (Vila); Jan Chappell (Cally) and Paul Darrow (Avon)

=== Planning ===
Planning for the third series began in November 1978. Gareth Thomas' departure meant the series would continue without Blake. According to David Maloney, "...a decision had to be made to go with a third series or stop it completely. Terry Nation, naturally, was for going on with it, and I think Ronnie Marsh was too, because of the viewing figures. [...] I think it was felt that they couldn't take it off, so why not be cheeky and do Blake's 7 without Blake?".

=== Storyline ideas ===
Nation was requested to write several scripts and to influence the format of the new series. As before, a story arc was planned. During the first half of the series, the Liberator crew would search for the missing Blake and in a mid-series climax would discover his grave. Nation was commissioned to write the first two episodes, which would establish the new format and characters. The final story of the series would, it was intended, conclude Blake's 7.

By December, the idea of a new lead character, 'The Captain', was mooted. The Captain, envisaged as being aged between 35 and 55, would be veteran of the Intergalactic War that began in Series Two. 'The Captain' would become the Liberator crew's new leader and would ultimately betray the crew to the Federation for personal profit. Maloney was concerned that casting an older, well-known actor for the final series of an established series would be difficult. He persuaded Nation to change 'The Captain' – now named Del Tarrant – into a younger character. Tarrant is a corruption of Nation's name that appears frequently in his work. Nation imagined this new, younger Tarrant as "...someone like the Spitfire pilots of World War II, who were young and didn't know the meaning of fear".

Instead of Tarrant, Avon would become the lead character of the series. The intention was to soften the character of Avon and make him more moralistic. This was resisted vehemently by Paul Darrow who believed that it was Avon's anti-heroic qualities that appealed to viewers. Darrow was also sceptical of the idea of Avon searching for Blake, considering Avon's oft-stated aim of taking control of the Liberator. The difficulties experienced with the script-writing of Series Three meant that the story arc was largely abandoned, although there are references to Avon's search for Federation torturer 'Shrinker' in episodes prior to their encounter in Rumours of Death. Tarrant became a more heroic character than originally intended. A new title sequence, featuring the Liberator and three Federation pursuit ships, was created by Doug Burd to replace the original sequence that features Gareth Thomas prominently.

It was decided that the series would conclude with the destruction of Liberator, the scenes for which were filmed on the series' final day of recording, Friday 7 March 1980. Special effects designer Jim Francis, who had the task of destroying the sets on camera, recalled; "It was a big set to destroy. [...] All the pyrotechnics and the big beams dropping from the ceiling could only be done once, which meant we couldn't rehearse it. Everybody did what they were told, and it looked great".

=== New characters ===
Series 3 Production Personnel
Designers		Don Taylor; Gerry Scott; Steve Brownsey; Ken Ledsham; Ray London; Paul Munting; Jan Spoczynski; Jim Clay
Production Unit Manager		Sheelagh Rees
Costume Designers		Dee Robson; Nicholas Rocker
Make-up Artist		Sheelagh Wells
Film Editor		Sheila S. Tomlinson
Videotape Editors		Sam Upton; Malcolm Banthorpe
Film Cameramen		Peter Chapman; Anthony Mayne
Film Recordists		Ian Sansom; Stan Nightingale
Senior Cameramen		Bob Baxter; Dave White
Studio Lighting		Brian Clemett
Studio Sound		Malcolm Johnson; Richard Partridge
Vision Mixers		Nigel Finnis; Shirley Coward; Paul del Bravo
Graphic Designer		Douglas Burd
Visual Effects Designers		Steve Drewett; Jim Francis
Special Sound		Elizabeth Parker
Electronic Effects		A.J. Mitchell
Stunt Co-Ordinators		Stuart Fell; Max Faulkner; Tex Fuller

Steven Pacey was cast as Tarrant. Pacey was told about the part by Chris Boucher at the BBC bar. Remembering his audition, Pacey said, "...reading the character breakdown, and it said, 'Del Tarrant is thirty-five years old-' and I thought, 'This is a bit silly, I'm only twenty-one'. I went downstairs thinking it was a waste of time, and saw other actors who all seemed nearer the right age. When I went to see David Maloney [...] his advice to me was to keep my performance as gritty as possible". Maloney was concerned that Pacey's curly hair made Pacey look similar to Gareth Thomas. Judith Smith, Maloney's production secretary, recalled that "...there was all the rigmarole about trying to straighten his hair and can we cut it really short, and what can we do?".

To replace Jenna, Nation created Dayna Mellanby, a skilled combat expert partly based on the character of Miranda from Shakespeare's play The Tempest. Nation "...thought it would be interesting to have a girl who was aggressive, to have somebody who would kill first and ask questions later, and it was nice to give what are generally masculine attitudes to a woman". Josette Simon was chosen to play Dayna; Simon had recently graduated from the Royal Academy of Dramatic Art and did not have an Equity card.

=== Writers and directors ===
Writers Allan Prior and Robert Holmes returned for the new series. New to the series were Ben Steed, a short story writer who had also written for Coronation Street, and Crown Court; Tanith Lee, a successful fantasy novelist; James Follet, who had written science fiction serials for radio, notably Earthsearch; Trevor Hoyle, who had published two novelisations of Terry Nation's Series One scripts and John Fletcher. Chris Boucher intended to write two scripts, one of which would be City on the Edge of the World. This script was prompted by a request by Michael Keating, who later recalled, "...my daughter, who was about five or six at the time, thought Vila was stupid; Chris Boucher said, 'I'll write you a story where you get the girl'". Difficulties arose with Robert Holmes' story, entitled Sweetly Dreaming... Slowly Dying, and John Fletcher's story about Hell's Angels in space. Both scripts were abandoned. Ben Steed was commissioned to write the replacement for Sweetly Dreaming... Slowly Dying which became Moloch, while Boucher replaced the Fletcher script with Death-Watch.

Vere Lorrimer, the only returning director, directed four episodes in Series Three. The remaining episodes were directed by Desmond McCarthy, Gerald Blake, Andrew Morgan, Fiona Cumming and Mary Ridge. David Maloney directed Powerplay, the first episode to be recorded, to help the new cast members to settle into their roles.

=== Filming and broadcast ===
Recording of Series Three began on Monday 30 July 1979 and continued until March 1980. During filming on location and at Ealing Studios, industrial action began at BBC Television Centre in late 1979, which disrupted many BBC programmes. When filming was completed and the cast and crew were ready for recording at Television Centre, the strike had ended and Blake's 7 was unaffected. Because Terminal was intended to conclude Blake's 7, Maloney persuaded Gareth Thomas to reprise the role of Blake. Thomas was not available for the studio recording days so his scenes were filmed in a village hall near Pyrton Hill, Oxfordshire, where the scenes set on the planet Terminal were being filmed. While on location for that episode, an accident occurred during a rehearsal for a stunt; Deep Roy, an extra, needed treatment for a broken collarbone.

The first episode of Series Three was transmitted on Monday, 7 January 1980 at 7:15 pm. Competition came from Coronation Street, game show Give Us a Clue and sitcom Keep it in the Family. Coverage of the Winter Olympics meant that the episode Children of Auron was shown on a Tuesday; the series returned to its regular time the following week. The series was watched by an average of 9.5 million viewers. When the final episode, Terminal, was shown on 31 March 1980, the Blake's 7 production office had closed and the cast and crew had dispersed. They were surprised that, during the closing credits of Terminal, the continuity announcer declared that a new series of Blake's 7 would be shown the following year. The Head of BBC Television, Bill Cotton, was impressed by Terminal as he watched its broadcast at home. He telephoned BBC Presentation and instructed that an announcement be made during the end credits that the series would return.

== Series Four (1980–1981) ==
The Blake's 7 cast in Series Four (1981): Glynis Barber (Soolin); Josette Simon (Dayna); Paul Darrow (Avon); Michael Keating (Vila) and Steven Pacey (Tarrant). Orac is in the foreground.

=== Production staff ===
Producing the new series presented significant challenges since several of the cast and crew were engaged in other projects and the Liberator sets had been destroyed during the recording of Terminal. Chris Boucher was available and willing to return as script editor. However, David Maloney was now working on The Day of the Triffids and When the Boat Comes In and was not available. Maloney suggested that Vere Lorrimer, who had directed episodes in all previous series, had the necessary experience to produce Blake's 7. Lorrimer travelled to Los Angeles to meet Terry Nation – who was now working as a Hollywood producer – to discuss the series' new format. Nation approved the changes but played little part in the development of this series. Director Mary Ridge returned, directing the first episode to ensure continuity with Series Three's closing episode Terminal. The other directors hired for the series were David Sullivan Proudfoot, Vivienne Cozens, Brian Lighthill and Viktors Ritelis. When David Sullivan Proudfoot was taken ill during the shooting of Assassin, Vere Lorrimer replaced him to direct some of this episode's scenes.

=== Story ideas ===
The Liberator's destruction led to major changes to the series' format. Chris Boucher has suggested that the fourth series can be viewed as an entirely new series. In this series, the rebels would have a planetary base on the planet Xenon – spelt Zenon in early drafts. The story arc proposed for this series involved Avon recruiting scientists and using their expertise to resist the Federation. Because this would impose a running order on the episodes, and because the rebels could become too powerful, the scripts often ended with the scientist dead and the rebels gaining nothing.

Avon, still the leader of the group, was portrayed as being increasingly determined to destroy the Federation, in contrast to the first series where Avon had dismissed Blake's aims as insane, his own being to obtain wealth. Avon becomes increasingly self-centred and paranoid: in Stardrive he showed few reservations about causing the death of a scientist in order to escape Federation pursuit ships; and in Orbit he threatened to do the same to Vila. In Blake, Avon kills his former comrade whom he accuses of betrayal, unaware that Blake was playing a double game in order to recruit freedom fighters genuinely opposed to the Federation.

From an early stage, Lorrimer and Boucher doubted that Blake's 7 would be renewed for a fifth series. Boucher was disappointed; he thought that an additional series would have enabled the cast and crew to become comfortable with the new format. The first proposal for the series' conclusion, titled Attack, involved Blake returning to lead an assault on the Federation on Earth, finally defeating them. This idea was rejected by Lorrimer, who thought it "...would be like five men trying to defeat the German army". Influenced by the films Butch Cassidy and the Sundance Kid and The Wild Bunch, Boucher decided that concluding the series in a shoot-out would provide a more memorable ending. Apart from Blake, the characters' fates would be deliberately ambiguous in case a fifth series was commissioned. Blake was to be given the dying words; "Oh Avon, I didn't take any of them on trust... except you... You are my... only friend", but these were removed because Blake's ability to deliver them after the violence of his shooting stretched credibility.

=== Character changes ===
Series 4 Production Personnel
Designers		Roger Cann; Nigel Curzon; Graham Lough; Eric Walmsley; Ken Ledsham; Paul Allen
Costume Designer		Nicholas Rocker
Make-up Artist		Suzanne Jansen
Film Editor		Sheila S. Tomlinson
Videotape Editors		Sam Upton; Malcolm Banthorpe; Ian Williams
Film Cameraman		Fintan Sheehan
Film Recordists		John Tellick; Mike Savage; Stuart Moser; Dick Manton; Dennis Panchen
Senior Cameraman		Dave White
Studio Lighting		Warwick Fielding; Brian Clemett
Studio Sound		Malcolm Johnson; Richard Partridge; Trevor Webster
Vision Mixers		Nigel Finnis; Mary Kellehar
Graphic Designers		Douglas Burd; Dick Bailey; Iain Greenway
Visual Effects Designers		Jim Francis; Andrew Lazell; Mike Kelt
Special Sound		Elizabeth Parker
Video Effects		Robin Lobb
Stunt Co-Ordinators		Stuart Fell; Terry Forrestal; Neil Dickson; Mike Potter

At the early planning stage, it was unclear which of the regular cast would be returning. Jan Chappell had become dissatisfied with the role of Cally. Chappell was asked to reprise the role, first for six episodes, then three and finally one. She declined, but recorded an uncredited voiceover for Cally's death in Rescue.

To replace Cally, Boucher created Soolin, a 25-year-old gunslinger. The character's name partly derived from Boucher's wife's name, Lynn. Soolin had killed the man who raised and trained her in revenge for his murder of her parents. Glynis Barber, who had played a Mutoid in the first series episode Project Avalon, was cast as Soolin. Barber would later attain fame in Dempsey and Makepeace.

Jacqueline Pearce had fallen ill and was hospitalised shortly after Series Three had finished recording. Believing that Pearce may not be available, a new female villain – Commissioner Sleer – was devised. When Pearce indicated her availability for the series, Sleer became Servalan's pseudonym, Servalan being considered dead by the Federation's new regime.

Gareth Thomas agreed to return for a final appearance as Blake on the condition that his character would be irrevocably killed.

=== Sets and models ===
Vere Lorrimer decided that the new series should be darker and less glamorous than its predecessors. The crew would acquire a new spacecraft that should be somewhat cramped and more functional, akin to the Nostromo from the film Alien, than the Liberator. Chris Boucher, writing the opening episode, Rescue, created the Scorpio, describing it as "a fairly small and undistinguished looking cargo ship, moderately scruffy and beaten up". The Scorpio model was designed by Jim Francis and constructed by Ron Thornton, later of Foundation Imaging. The Scorpio's interior was designed by Roger Cann and director Mary Ridge, who worked to make the new set easier to shoot on and less fragile than the Liberator sets had been.

=== Writing ===
The first six scripts were commissioned from writers familiar with the series – Ben Steed, Robert Holmes, James Follet, Allan Prior and Roger Parkes. Scripts for the second six episodes were commissioned from established writers Robert Holmes and Tanith Lee and from new writers Rod Beacham, Bill Lyons, Colin Davis and Simon Masters. Scripts that were commissioned but abandoned were Ragnarok by former Doctor Who producer Graham Williams and Man of Iron by Paul Darrow, about an attempt by Servalan to regain power using androids created by the scientist Algor on the planet Epsilon.

Because of the uncertainty over Jan Chappell's availability, most of the early scripts were written for Cally, whose lines were given to Soolin. A scene of Vila crying while hiding from Avon, whom he believes is intent on killing him, was removed from the final edit of the episode Orbit as it was felt to be too strong for a family programme.

=== Filming and broadcast ===
Filming for Series Four commenced on Monday 23 February 1981 on location at Pyrton Hill for the scenes in Rescue set on the planet Terminal. Location filming for the final episode, Blake, took place between 13 and 15 October 1981. Following rehearsals, recording began in the studio at BBC Television Centre on 5 November 1981. The final shoot-out was recorded on 6 November. Recording on Blake's 7 concluded on Saturday 7 November 1981. A new title sequence, featuring a new logo for the series, was created by Doug Burd. Vere Lorrimer wrote lyrics, titled Distant Star, for the series theme music with the notion that Steven Pacey would sing them over a new arrangement of the theme by Norrie Paramour. Pacey did not agree with this idea, and Dudley Simpson created a more lively arrangement of the theme for the closing titles.

Unknown to Ridge, Thomas was determined to eliminate any ambiguity over Blake's death. He had arranged with the visual effects team to ensure that as much blood as possible was seen when Blake was killed. Ridge was somewhat shocked when Thomas set off the charge to create the gunshot effect during the recording of his final scene.

The final series of Blake's 7 began transmission on Monday 28 September 1981, competing with Coronation Street, game show Bullseye and sitcom Never the Twain (replaced mid-series by Astronauts). The series attracted an average of 8.5 million viewers. The apparent massacre at the end of the final episode provoked a strong reaction from many viewers, who were upset to see their heroes meet a grisly fate. Chris Boucher believed that the date on which the final episode was broadcast – 21 December 1981 – was unfortunate, and has since described himself as "the man who killed Father Christmas".

== See also ==
- Blake's 7
- List of Blake's 7 episodes
