= List of Blake's 7 episodes =

Blake's 7 is a British science fiction television series that was created by Terry Nation and produced by the British Broadcasting Corporation (BBC). Four series were produced between 2 January 1978 and 21 December 1981, all of which have been released on VHS and Region 2 DVD. From September 2021 to June 2022, Forces TV began airing repeats of all 52 episodes of Blake's 7 for the first time; this was followed by a weekly re-run on GBTV from January 2022. On 19 January 2026, it is announced that Blake’s 7 would be rebooted under the new production company Multitude Productions with Doctor Who and The Last of Us director Peter Hoar.

Following the deaths of David Jackson in 2005, Peter Tuddenham in 2007, Gareth Thomas in 2016, Jacqueline Pearce in 2018, Paul Darrow in 2019, Stephen Greif in 2022 and Michael Keating in 2026, Sally Knyvette, Jan Chappell, Brian Croucher, Steven Pacey, Josette Simon and Glynis Barber are the surviving cast members of Blake's 7.

== Liberator and Scorpio Crew ==
The following cast members made regular appearances in Blake's 7:

- Gareth Thomas – Roj Blake (series 1–2 as a regular, series 3–4 as a guest)
- Sally Knyvette – Jenna Stannis (series 1–2)
- Paul Darrow – Kerr Avon (series 1–4)
- Michael Keating – Vila Restal (series 1–4)
- David Jackson – Olag Gan (series 1–2)
- Jan Chappell – Cally (series 1–3)
- Peter Tuddenham – Zen / Orac / Slave (as voices; series 1–4)
- Josette Simon – Dayna Mellanby (series 3–4)
- Steven Pacey – Del Tarrant (series 3–4)
- Glynis Barber – Soolin (series 4)

== Federation ==
- Jacqueline Pearce – Servalan, Supreme Commander (Series 1–3); Commissioner Sleer (Series 4)
- Stephen Greif – Travis, Space Commander (Series 1)
- Brian Croucher – Travis, Space Commander (Series 2)

== Series overview ==
Series	Episodes	Originally released		Average viewers (in millions)
Series	Episodes	First released	Last released	Average viewers (in millions)
1	13	2 January 1978	27 March 1978	9.22
2	13	9 January 1979	3 April 1979	7.13
3	13	7 January 1980	31 March 1980	9.44
4	13	28 September 1981	21 December 1981	8.49

== Episodes ==
=== Series 1 (1978) ===
Series 1 aired on BBC1, Mondays, mostly 7:15 p.m., 2 January 1978 to 27 March 1978, Producer: David Maloney. It averaged 9.22 million viewers on original airing in the UK, with an average chart position of 45.

No.	Title	Directed by	Written by	Original release date	UK viewers (in millions) chart position in brackets
1.1 (1)	"The Way Back"	Michael E. Briant	Terry Nation	2 January 1978	7.4 (72)
Before the series starts, Roj Blake had been a resistance leader against the totalitarian Federation that had murdered his family. Instead of killing him as a martyr, the Federation erased his memories and reprogrammed him into a content citizen. One day, Blake is led outside the city dome by a friend who is really a fellow resistance member. Blake then attends an illegal meeting to protest the unpopular government policies where he is told of his past and what the Federation did to him. In disbelief, Blake walks off to think—just as a Federation security squad arrives and efficiently shoots everybody down. As Blake witnesses the horror that unfolds, it re-awakes his suppressed memories. When the government finds out his memory has returned, he is arrested on trumped-up charges of child molestation and sentenced to the prison colony on Cygnus Alpha. Blake urges Tel Varon, a public defender at his trial, to dig deeper for evidence of his innocence. Varon hesitantly does so and learns the victims' statements were indeed fabricated. He then goes with his wife Maja to the site of the massacre, and records evidence of the slaughter. However, he and his wife are killed by a Federation agent as they return to the city. Meanwhile, Blake is put aboard the transport ship London, and sent on his way to Cygnus Alpha. Along the way he meets the talented thief Vila Restal, and the smuggler pilot Jenna Stannis. Introducing: Gareth Thomas as Roj Blake, Michael Keating as Vila Restal, and Sally Knyvette as Jenna Stannis; Guest Stars: Robert Beatty (as Bran Foster), Michael Halsey (as Tel Varon), Pippa Steel (as Maja Varon), Jeremy Wilkin (as Dev Tarrant), Robert James (as Ven Glynd), Gillian Bailey (as Ravella), Alan Butler (as Richie), Susan Field (as Alta Morag), Peter Williams (as Dr. Havant), Margaret John (as Arbiter), Rodney Figaro (as Clerk of Court), Nigel Lambert (as Computer operator), Garry McDermott (as Guard)
1.2 (2)	"Space Fall"	Pennant Roberts	Terry Nation	9 January 1978	7.3 (73)
Blake is introduced to Kerr Avon, who used his technical prowess to nearly get away with stealing five million credits from the Federation banking system. Knowing he has a good pilot (Jenna), a lockpick expert (Vila) and now a computer specialist (Avon), Blake devises a plan to hijack the London. He also gains the help of a physically imposing man, Olag Gan, who agrees to be his strong arm. When the London enters a battle between unidentified ships, Blake unleashes his mutiny plan but fails to take over. Later, the London comes upon an abandoned unidentified vessel and the first officer, Sub-Commander Raiker, persuades the captain to capture it for a salvage reward. Losing some of his men to lethal traps on the ship, Raiker sends Blake, Jenna and Avon in. Blake disables the trap and Jenna is able to control the ship, allowing their escape. Introducing: Paul Darrow as Kerr Avon, and David Jackson as Olag Gan; Guest Stars: Glyn Owen (as Leylan), Leslie Schofield (as Raiker), Norman Tipton (as Artix), Tom Kelly (as Nova), David Hayward (as Teague), Brett Forrest (as Krell), Michael MacKenzie (as Dainer), Bill Weston (as Garton)
1.3 (3)	"Cygnus Alpha"	Vere Lorrimer	Terry Nation	16 January 1978	8.5 (54)
Blake, Jenna, and Avon commandeer the alien ship and discover the mind-reading control computer Zen, who renames the ship the Liberator after drawing the word from Jenna's thoughts. Exploring the ship, they find a wealth of advanced technology including a fully functional teleportation system and an armoury of weapons. Next, Blake follows the London to Cygnus Alpha and mounts a rescue to save Vila and Gan from the sadistic religious cult that runs the prison world. Blake infiltrates the complex only to find that his friends and the other prisoners have succumbed to the "Curse of Cygnus", a medical condition caused by the planet's atmosphere; the only treatment is a drug controlled by the fanatical cult leader Vargas. Blake eventually leads a breakout with Gan and Vila, while on the Liberator, Jenna and Avon consider abandoning Blake after losing contact. Jenna holds out for Blake—who makes it back with Vila and Gan, but along with Vargas who holds them prisoner. While Vargas rants about using the ship to rule the universe, he steps back onto the teleport pad and Blake beams him into the vacuum of space. Introducing: Peter Tuddenham as the voice of Zen; Guest Stars: Brian Blessed (as Vargas), Pamela Salem (as Kara), Glyn Owen (as Leylan), Norman Tipton (as Artix), Robert Russell (as Laran), Peter Childs (as Arco), David Ryall (as Selman)
1.4 (4)	"Time Squad"	Pennant Roberts	Terry Nation	23 January 1978	8.9 (39)
Blake decides to destroy a Federation communications complex at Saurian Major as the first major strike against the Federation. Along the way, a distress call leads the Liberator to an escape pod with cryonically frozen beings aboard. Arriving at the Saurian complex, Blake teleports down with Avon and Vila and searches for other resistance fighters to help him take out the installation. They meet an Auron woman named Cally whom Blake convinces to help them. Back on the Liberator, Gan and Jenna deal with the thawed beings who turn out to be dangerous killers conditioned to protect the genetic stock aboard their pod. On the planet, Blake and his team successfully infiltrate the complex where Avon overrides the safety protocols of a reactor; seconds before the explosion an injured Gan teleports the team to safety. Blake rescues Jenna, and they dispose of the pod in deep space. Cally accepts Blake's offer to join the Liberator crew. Introducing: Jan Chappell as Cally; Guest Stars: Tony Smart, Mark McBride, Frank Henson (as The Aliens)
1.5 (5)	"The Web"	Michael E. Briant	Terry Nation	30 January 1978	9.6 (41)
Under psychic control, Cally sabotages the Liberator to bring it to an uncharted world, where it becomes trapped in a cloud of strange web-like strands encompassing the planet. Jenna is momentarily possessed and relays a message from the inhabitants of the planet, a group of people known as "The Lost", descendants of Cally's home planet Auron. Blake teleports down to meet The Lost who offer a means to escape the web, but require energy cells from the Liberator as payment. Blake gives them the cells, but discovers The Lost will use the energy to destroy another race of creatures known as Decimas whom The Lost created through genetic engineering. Not wanting to be party to genocide, Blake tries to stop them and to free his ship. Eventually the Decimas invade the complex and destroy their creators. In the midst of the confusion, Blake and Avon succeed in activating a fungicide beam which creates a clear passage through the web, enabling them to escape ahead of the oncoming Federation Pursuit Ships. Guest Stars: Richard Beale (as Saymon), Ania Marson (as Geela), Miles Fothergill (as Novara), Deep Roy, Marcus Powell, Gilda Cohen, Ismet Hassam, Molly Tweedley, Willie Sheara (as Decimas)
1.6 (6)	"Seek-Locate-Destroy"	Vere Lorrimer	Terry Nation	6 February 1978	10.9 (34)
Blake and his crew infiltrate a Federation base on the planet Centero to steal a decryption cipher. During their escape, Cally is separated from them and loses her teleport bracelet during a struggle. The others learn she is missing only after returning to the Liberator. As news of Blake's exploits begin to spread, Federation Supreme Commander Servalan, under pressure from the Federation High Council, appoints Space Commander Travis to eliminate the fugitives, although this is met with disapproval by her colleagues. Travis, however, takes personal pleasure in accepting the assignment as he had lost both an eye and an arm (having replaced the latter with a cybernetic limb) during the original confrontation to capture Blake on Earth. When Travis finds Cally alive, he uses her as bait in a trap for Blake. Blake initiates a hit-and-run attack to rescue Cally, during which he manages to damage Travis' cybernetic hand before escaping; Travis vows revenge. Introducing: Jacqueline Pearce as Servalan, and Stephen Greif as Travis; Guest Stars: Peter Miles (as Rontane), John Bryans (as Bercol), Peter Craze (as Prell), Ian Oliver (as Rai), Ian Cullen (as Escon), Astley Jones (as Eldon).
1.7 (7)	"Mission to Destiny"	Pennant Roberts	Terry Nation	13 February 1978	9.6 (46)
The Liberator encounters the freighter Ortega drifting in uncontrolled circles in space. After boarding, Blake, Avon and Cally find most of the crew unconscious, one of the crew murdered, and the flight control systems deliberately smashed. When the survivors awaken, their leader Dr. Kendall explains their important mission to deliver a valuable energy substance called the neutrotope to their home world of Destiny, to halt a fungal contamination in the food supply. Blake decides to deliver the neutrotope himself with the Liberator, while Avon and Cally remain to help repair the Ortega and identify who is behind the murder and sabotage. The rest of the Ortega crew are teleported aboard to the Liberator except Sara who stays behind. Guest Stars: Barry Jackson (as Kendall), Beth Morris (as Sara), Stephen Tate (as Mandrian), Nigel Humphreys (as Sonheim), John Leeson (as Pasco), Kate Coleridge (as Levett), Carl Forgione (as Grovane), Brian Capron (as Rafford), Stuart Fell (as Dortmunn)
1.8 (8)	"Duel"	Douglas Camfield	Terry Nation	20 February 1978	10.0 (45)
Space Commander Travis and his three Federation warships have tracked the Liberator to an uncharted planet where Blake, Jenna, and Gan are investigating the surface. After the three explore the ruins of an ancient civilisation, they hurriedly return to the Liberator as Travis closes in to attack. With the Liberator low on energy reserves, Blake decides not to run but to face his enemy head-on. Suddenly, a powerful being named Sinofar, who is intolerant of war, cripples the ships and sends Blake and Jenna back to the planet. There they are forced to fight Travis and his "mutoid" pilot in mortal combat so they will learn the meaning of death. Guest Stars: Isla Blair (as Sinofar), Patsy Smart (as Giroc), Carol Royle (as Mutoid)
1.9 (9)	"Project Avalon"	Michael E. Briant	Terry Nation	27 February 1978	9.7 (36)
Space Commander Travis has captured a resistance leader named Avalon, and holds her captive in a Federation lab located underground on a frigid planet. Avalon had earlier contacted Blake to take her to a newly constructed resistance base, and Blake is determined to rescue her. After pulling off the rescue, Blake discovers he has instead saved an android clone of Avalon, which is programmed to kill everyone aboard the Liberator by releasing a deadly, fast-acting virus. Guest Stars: Julia Vidler (as Avalon), David Bailie (as Chevner), Glynis Barber (as Mutoid), John Rolfe (as Terloc), John Baker (as Scientist), David Sterne, Mark Holmes (as Guards)
1.10 (10)	"Breakdown"	Vere Lorrimer	Terry Nation	6 March 1978	8.8 (41)
A behavioural "limiter" implant in Gan's brain malfunctions and he violently threatens the lives of the crew. Once he is captured and sedated, Blake rushes to get him to a nearby medical facility called XK-72, but the route takes the Liberator through a dangerous gravity vortex. The suicidal manoeuvre causes the argumentative Avon to declare that he is quitting Blake's team for good. Once at the medical facility, a surgeon named Kayn and his aide teleport to the Liberator to operate on Gan, but Kayn delays the procedure when he becomes suspicious of Blake. Meanwhile, Avon stays behind on the station to negotiate with the staff for sanctuary, but soon discovers that someone has already alerted the Federation to Blake's arrival, and gunships are on the way. Guest Stars: Julian Glover (as Kayn), Christian Roberts (as Renor), Ian Thompson (as Farren)
1.11 (11)	"Bounty"	Pennant Roberts	Terry Nation	13 March 1978	9.6 (40)
Blake locates President Sarkoff, the deposed leader of the planet Lindor, which is on the verge of civil war. If war breaks out, the Federation will send in "peacekeeping" forces and easily annex it. While Blake urges the president to take back his leadership, the Liberator answers a distress call from another ship; it turns out to be from a notorious bounty hunter, Tarvin, a former colleague of Jenna, who hijacks the Liberator and tries to cash in on the 13 million credit reward on the crew's heads. Note: Sarkoff's residence is the Waterloo Tower in Quex Park, Birchington, Kent. Guest Stars: T. P. McKenna (as Sarkoff), Carinthia West (as Tyce), Marc Zuber (as Tarvin), Mark York (as Cheney), Derrick Branche (as Amagon guard)
1.12 (12)	"Deliverance"	Michael E. Briant, David Maloney (uncredited)	Terry Nation	20 March 1978	9.0 (36)
After the Liberator crew witnesses a small ship explode above the planet Cephlon, Avon, Vila, Gan and Jenna teleport down to the surface to locate two jettisoned escape capsules. In the process, Jenna is abducted by the planet's Neanderthal-like natives and the others search for her. On the Liberator, a mortally injured survivor, Ensor, is brought aboard, but he holds Cally at gunpoint and forces Blake to take him to the planet Aristo, where his father awaits urgent medical supplies. Blake learns that Ensor's father is the creator of a device called "Orac", which is something the Federation wants very badly. Once Ensor dies from his injuries, Blake turns the Liberator around and races back to rescue his friends. Back on Cephlon, Avon, Vila and Gan discover an ancient stasis capsule ship called Deliverance and a mysterious woman named Meegat, who tells Avon that it is his destiny to launch the ship into space. Guest Stars: Tony Caunter (as Ensor), Suzan Farmer (as Meegat), James Lister (as Maryatt)
1.13 (13)	"Orac"	Vere Lorrimer	Terry Nation	27 March 1978	10.6 (27)
Back en route to Aristo, Avon, Vila, Gan and Jenna begin to suffer from the radiation exposure they received while on Cephlon, and require anti-rad serum to survive. Arriving at the planet, Blake and Cally go to the surface to find Professor Ensor and deliver the medical supplies in hopes he will have serum to trade. Unbeknownst to them, Servalan and Travis have also arrived to get to the professor, but the two must find his lab, which is hidden within a maze of underground passages inhabited by hostile creatures. Blake eventually procures the serum for his crew and gets his hands on the mysterious "Orac", an advanced computer that gives Blake a daunting prediction of the future – the destruction of the Liberator. Guest Stars: Derek Farr (as Ensor and the voice of Orac), James Muir, Paul Kidd (as Phibians) Note: Last regular appearance of Stephen Greif as Travis I.

=== Series 2 (1979) ===
Series 2 aired on BBC1, Tuesdays, mostly 7:20 p.m., 9 January 1979 to 3 April 1979. Producer: David Maloney. It averaged 7.14 million viewers on original airing in the UK, with an average chart position of 79, a drop of over two million viewers on that of Series 1.

No.	Title	Directed by	Written by	Original release date	UK viewers (in millions) chart position in brackets
2.1 (14)	"Redemption"	Vere Lorrimer	Terry Nation	9 January 1979	7.9 (50)
Blake and the crew become obsessed with Orac's prediction of the destruction of the Liberator. However, there are more pressing matters when the ship comes under attack by its alien creators, "The System", who want their property back. After fleeing, Liberator's control systems shut down; Blake heads to engineering to fix the problem but is attacked by a "living" wire cable with a mind of its own. Meanwhile, Liberator is remote-piloted to The System's space station and the crew are taken prisoner. With Orac's help, the crew escapes The System who send out another attack ship which looks exactly like the Liberator; Blake now wonders which Liberator Orac had predicted seeing destroyed. Introducing: Peter Tuddenham as the voice of Orac; Guest Stars: Sheila Ruskin (as Alta One), Harriet Philpin (as Alta Two), Roy Evans (as Slave)
2.2 (15)	"Shadow"	Jonathan Wright Miller	Chris Boucher	16 January 1979	7.6 (87)
The crew arrives at Space City where Blake seeks contact with the criminal organisation Terra Nostra as possible resistance allies, but their leader Largo may have loyalty to the enemy. Meanwhile, an alien entity takes possession of Orac through his dimensional logic circuits and disrupts Cally's empathic powers, driving her to madness. Blake and his crew then rush to the desert planet Zondar to seek the heavily guarded source of the drug known as "Shadow", which is the basis of Terra Nostra's power and the only help for Cally. Guest Stars: Karl Howman (as Bek), Adrienne Burgess (as Hanna), Derek Smith (as Largo), Archie Tew (as Enforcer), Vernon Dobtcheff (as Chairman)
2.3 (16)	"Weapon"	George Spenton-Foster	Chris Boucher	23 January 1979	6.4 (108)
The Federation is in pursuit of a powerful weapon called the IMIPAK, (Induced Molecular Instability Projector and Key), a beam rifle that marks a living target with a point of unstable matter that the firer can use to kill the target later as they choose with a special hand-held remote. Its designer, a paranoid defector named Coser, is on the run; Servalan hires a "psycho-strategist" named Carnell to profile Coser and determine where he is hiding. Servalan also has beings called the Clone Masters create a living copy of Blake, with whom Coser is expected to meet in order to steal the weapon for her. Once in possession of it, she marks Blake, Avon, and Gan so that their only hope for survival is to outrun the IMIPAK's million-mile triggering signal. Introducing: Brian Croucher as the recast of Travis; Guest Stars: John Bennett (as Coser), Candace Glendenning (as Rashel), Scott Fredericks (as Carnell), Kathleen Byron (as Clonemaster Fen), Graham Simpson (as Officer)
2.4 (17)	"Horizon"	Jonathan Wright Miller	Allan Prior	30 January 1979	6.3 (93)
At the edge of the galaxy, Liberator nearly collides with a Federation freighter. Blake is curious to know why the ship is so far from home and decides to follow it to a mysterious planet called Horizon. Teleporting down, Blake and Jenna discover a secret mining operation and are captured for interrogation. Gan and Vila go down to find them but are captured as well. All are forced to work in a dangerous mine while Blake tries to urge Ro, the planet's leader, that the Federation is manipulating him and enslaving his people. Meanwhile, Avon considers taking the Liberator and leaving them all behind, but Cally won't hear of it and goes down to find the others. Avon asks Orac what his chances are of surviving against the Federation alone. Guest Stars: Darien Angadi (as Ro), William Squire (as Kommissar), Souad Faress (as Selma), Brian Miller (as Assistant Kommissar), Paul Haley (as Chief guard)
2.5 (18)	"Pressure Point"	George Spenton-Foster	Terry Nation	6 February 1979	6.6 (100)
Blake decides to strike a major blow to the Federation by going to Earth and destroying "Control", the main computer nerve centre for the entire government. Blake hopes the act will allow the resistance groups led by a former Federation officer, Kasabi, to launch an all-out attack against the Federation command. Blake's plan gets under way, but the Federation has discovered the plan and captures Kasabi, forcing her daughter Veron to liaise with Blake, but trapping him with most of his crew. They eventually escape and manage to break into Control, only to discover that the building is empty and the computers housed there were removed 30 years previously. Just after Travis detonates a strontium grenade with Servalan, Gan is killed during their escape. The four remaining crew members Blake, Avon, Jenna and Vila are teleported back to Liberator for the first time without Gan. Guest Stars: Jane Sherwin (as Kasabi), Yolande Palfrey (as Veron), Alan Halley (as Arle), Martin Connor (as Berg), Sue Bishop (as Mutoid) Note: Last regular appearance of David Jackson as Olag Gan
2.6 (19)	"Trial"	Derek Martinus	Chris Boucher	13 February 1979	7.5 (82)
Servalan must answer to the mishandling of the Blake affair, and she tries to have Travis eliminated by setting him up on charges of mass murder before he can testify against her. Elsewhere, distraught over losing his friend Gan, Blake goes to an uninhabited planet to "think". Believing Blake has run out on them, Avon tries to persuade the others to abandon him once and for all. Down on the planet, Blake encounters a creature called Zil who warns that he will be "absorbed" by "the Host". In space, Zen detects unusual tectonic movement on the planet; Orac determines the entire planet is a living entity, which feeds on its surface lifeforms. After being rescued, Blake decides to send a clear message to the Federation that he has not given up, by launching a bold assault against Servalan's headquarters. The attack ironically allows Travis—who has been found guilty of the charges and sentenced to death—a means of escape, and he forces Servalan to help him get away. Guest Stars: John Savident (as Samor), John Bryans (as Bercol), Peter Miles (as Rontane), Victoria Fairbrother (as Thania), Claire Lewis (as Zil), Kevin Lloyd (as Par), Graham Sinclair (as Lye), Colin Dunn (as Guard commander)
2.7 (20)	"Killer"	Vere Lorrimer	Robert Holmes	20 February 1979	7.0 (95)
On the planet Fosforon, Avon and Vila sneak into Q-Base, a Federation com-station, looking for a crystal needed to decrypt new Federation pulse-codes. In space, Zen detects a 700-year-old Earth vessel on approach to the station, and Cally senses something "malignant" aboard. Blake anonymously warns the station of the ship despite objections from Jenna that he is helping the enemy. On the planet, Avon blackmails Tynus, a former associate, to help Avon steal the crystal. Tynus arranges for a diversion that will allow Avon to slip past security, but it may be a ruse. Meanwhile, the base tows the derelict back to the planet whereupon Blake teleports down to warn them in person, but he is too late as the base unwittingly releases a swift-killing alien virus. Guest Stars: Paul Daneman (as Dr. Bellfriar), Ronald Lacey (as Tynus), Colin Farrell (as Gambril), Colin Higgins (as Tak), Morris Barry (as Wiler), Michael Gaunt (as Bax)
2.8 (21)	"Hostage"	Vere Lorrimer	Allan Prior	27 February 1979	7.8 (65)
The Federation sends out twenty pursuit ships to hunt Blake down and destroy him, but the Liberator withstands the assault and manages to get away. Blake then receives a message from his nemesis Travis, who has escaped the Federation and taken Blake's cousin Inga hostage on the planet Exbar. Travis makes the peculiar request to join up with Blake's crew since Servalan has made him a wanted criminal, but Blake believes it to be a ruse. He teleports down to the planet to rescue Inga, and meanwhile, unknown to Blake, Avon sends a message to Servalan with Travis' location. Concerned about Blake, Avon also teleports to the planet and later Vila joins him. The three are eventually rounded up by Travis, and his gang of "crimos" (criminal psychopaths), and Travis reveals his intention to take the Liberator after he kills them. Inga and her father Ushton manage to trick Travis and release Blake and his team, who eventually leave Travis to be found by Servalan. When Servalan arrives, she agrees to spare Travis' life, and officially list him as dead, as long as he continues to hunt Blake for her. Guest Stars: John Abineri (as Ushton), Judy Buxton (as Inga), Kevin Stoney (as Joban), James Coyle (as Molok), Andrew Robertson (as Space Commander), Judith Porter (as Mutoid) Note: Duncan Lamont was originally cast as Ushton but died after completing the location filming, which had to be reshot with John Abineri as a replacement.
2.9 (22)	"Countdown"	Vere Lorrimer	Terry Nation	6 March 1979	6.9 (72)
Blake arrives at the planet Albion to capture Space Major Provine who is supposed to know the secret location of the moved Federation Control. Provine, however, has triggered an inescapable radiation bomb in response to a planetary revolt against Federation rule. Avon, with the help of a mercenary acquaintance of his, Del Grant, rush to disable the bomb, which is hidden in a bunker somewhere at one of the frigid poles. Grant, however, still holds a grudge against Avon for the death of his sister Anna; they must put the issue aside if they are to stop the bomb in time. Meanwhile, Blake learns Provine is still alive, but does not realise he is disguised as a resistance soldier and trying to make his way to an escape ship. In the end, the bomb is finally disabled by Avon and Grant at the last minute. Guest Stars: Tom Chadbon (as Del Grant), Paul Shelley (as Provine), James Kerry (as Cauder), Lindy Alexander (as Ralli), Robert Arnold (as Selson), Geoffrey Snell (as Tronos), Sidney Kean (as Vetnor), Nigel Gregory (as Arrian)
2.10 (23)	"Voice from the Past"	George Spenton-Foster	Roger Parkes	13 March 1979	7.0 (80)
Blake suffers nightmares of the memory conditioning the Federation performed on him five years before. On course to the resort world Del-10, Blake makes a sudden unexplained course change to PK-118, a mining asteroid. Avon and the rest of the crew restrain Blake, believing that someone is trying to manipulate his mind. Blake, however, tricks Vila into believing that the others are plotting against him. Once free, Blake teleports to PK-118 where he meets a resistance group led by former Arbiter General Ven Glynd – a man who originally convicted Blake at his trial, but claims he has defected. Glynd, along with two other revolutionaries, the frail Shivan (whose face is masked with bandages), and Le Grand (a governor whose ship they later rendezvous with), claim they have enough legal evidence to non-violently overthrow the Federation. They request transport to a political meeting on planet Atlay. Avon and the others, however, smell a trap when they realize a device Shivan carries may be controlling Blake's mind. With henchman Nagu being stabbed, Shivan removes his bandages to reveal a bearded Travis. At the empty auditorium, four bodyguards and Ven Glynd stand together to see a mysterious image of Servalan on the screen and in the end, both Ven Glynd and Governor Le Grand are fatally shot by Travis and the Federation Guards respectively. Back at Liberator, Blake begins the search for Star One. Guest Stars: Richard Bebb (as Ven Glynd), Frieda Knorr (as Governor Le Grand), Martin Read (as Nagu)
2.11 (24)	"Gambit"	George Spenton-Foster	Robert Holmes	20 March 1979	6.6 (90)
Blake's team arrives at Freedom City, one of the last places not under Federation control, to find a cyber-surgeon named Docholli, who, rumour has it, is one of the few people who may know the secret location of Star One – the real control centre of the Federation. As Blake, Jenna, and Cally look for the surgeon, who is hiding under the false name Kline, they discover that he is guarded by Travis, who has sought the doctor for maintenance on his cybernetic arm. Through the assistance of a devious casino owner named Krantor, Servalan lurks behind the scenes plotting to eliminate Docholli. She lays a trap for him by capturing Travis and secretly placing a bomb in his cyber arm. Meanwhile, Avon and Vila sneak a miniaturised Orac, (reduced to 1/8th size by demonstrating controlled molecular implosion), to cheat in Krantor's Big Wheel casino and win large amounts of money. Vila is later tricked by Krantor to play "to the death" in a game of speed chess against an undefeated player known as The Klute. Guest Stars: Denis Carey (as Docholli), Aubrey Woods (as Krantor), Harry Jones (as Jarriere), Nicolette Roeg (as Chenie), John Leeson (as Toise), Sylvia Coleridge (as Croupier), Deep Roy (as Klute), Paul Grist (as Cevedic), Michael Halsey (as Zee)
2.12 (25)	"The Keeper"	Derek Martinus	Allan Prior	27 March 1979	7.0 (70)
With clues left by Docholli, Blake heads to the planet Goth to find a "brain-print" of a man named Lurgen who knew the secret location of Star One and stored it inside an amulet worn by a royal leader called "The Keeper". While in transit, Avon suggests taking over Star One rather than destroying it in order to gain control over the Federation, but Blake refuses ever to wield such power. After Blake, Jenna, and Vila teleport down to Goth, Zen detects a ship in orbit that Avon is certain belongs to Travis and destroys it. Travis, however, is already on the planet with Servalan to intercept the brain-print before Blake does. Travis offers to share control of the Federation with Servalan, but finds the brain-print himself and departs in Servalan's ship. Jenna and Vila attempt to amuse the king of the Goths while they try to identify the keeper. Eventually the location is found and the crew set course for Star One. Guest Stars: Bruce Purchase (as Gola), Shaun Curry (as Rod), Freda Jackson (as Tara), Cengiz Saner (as Fool), Arthur Hewlett (as Old man), Ron Tarr (as Patrol leader)
2.13 (26)	"Star One"	David Maloney (uncredited)	Chris Boucher	3 April 1979	8.2 (30)
With the location of Star One finally revealed, Blake is determined to finish his mission and destroy the control facility that keeps the Federation functioning. Again, Avon urges him to reconsider destroying it but Blake refuses. Meanwhile, Servalan deals with a series of weather-related catastrophes throughout several Federation worlds – the only theory is that someone is tampering with Star One. Upon arriving at Star One, Blake discovers that it has been taken over by Andromedan aliens in human guise who are posing as technicians and disrupting the systems. The aliens mistake Blake for Travis, and await his deactivation of Star One's defences; this will allow their 600-ship invasion force to move in and attack the Federation. When Travis arrives, he wounds Blake and deactivates the defences, but in the end, Travis is killed by Avon as he falls down in the well while Cally removes all the bombs before throwing down to the ground to set off an explosion. Jenna then alerts the Federation of the invasion force and all return to Liberator where Avon takes charge and makes a stand against the invaders until the Federation forces can arrive. Note: This episode features the last appearances of Brian Croucher as Travis II and Sally Knyvette as Jenna Stannis, and the last regular appearance of Gareth Thomas as Roj Blake. Guest Stars: Jenny Twigge (as Lurena), John Bown (as Durkim), David Webb (as Stot), Gareth Armstrong (as Parton), Paul Toothill (as Marcol), Michael Mayard (as Leeth)

=== Series 3 (1980) ===
Series 3 aired on BBC1, Mondays, mostly 7:15 p.m., 7 January 1980 to 31 March 1980. Producer: David Maloney. It averaged 9.45 million viewers on original airing in the UK, with an average chart position of 32, the highest rated series.

No.	Title	Directed by	Written by	Original release date	UK viewers (in millions) chart position in brackets
3.1 (27)	"Aftermath"	Vere Lorrimer	Terry Nation	7 January 1980	9.5 (43)
Star One has been destroyed, the Federation is in shambles, and the Liberator is severely damaged. The crew abandon ship using the Liberator's lifeboats as Zen has cut life-support and initiated self-repairs. With Blake and Jenna already being evacuated, an unconscious Avon is put in a lifeboat with Orac by Vila and Cally and they land on the planet Sarran. There, he is quickly attacked by the barbarian-like natives, but is soon saved by a woman named Dayna Mellanby. The two also find the equally stranded Servalan, and Dayna takes them to meet her father Hal and sister Lauren (an adopted native). This is Servalan’s first mission without Travis, the eye-patched villain. Servalan takes the opportunity to flirtatiously sway Avon into working to rebuild the Federation where they could rule together, but Avon rejects her proposal. Avon eventually makes contact with Zen and learns that everyone from the ship is missing. Servalan kills Hal and makes off with Orac who is the only one who can operate the teleporter once Liberator returns. Avon hunts her down and gets Orac back and leaves her stranded alone. Once back on Liberator, Avon and Dayna meet a Federation Captain who claims the ship as his own. Note: This episode was repeated on BBC1 on Monday 1 June 1981 at 7:15 p.m. Introducing: Josette Simon as Dayna Mellanby and Steven Pacey as Del Tarrant; Guest Stars: Cy Grant (as Hal Mellanby), Alan Lake (as Chel), Sally Harrison (as Lauren), Richard Franklin and Michael Melia (as Federation Troopers)
3.2 (28)	"Powerplay"	David Maloney	Terry Nation	14 January 1980	9.4 (37)
Aboard Liberator, Dayna and Avon are captured by Federation soldiers led by Captain Del Tarrant. They have been unable to control the Liberator, since Zen will not recognise their commands and remains on a search and recovery mission of the crew. Avon tries to hide his identity so that he won't be forced to turn over control of Zen. After a struggle the two are imprisoned in a cabin. Avon breaks the lock and a guard is found dead outside. Avon learns from Zen that the other Liberator crew are accounted for, but at different locations and Zen is trying to get to them. A second guard is found murdered and Tarrant reveals to Avon that he is the killer. Tarrant is actually a wanted resistance agent posing as a Federation officer. He then helps Avon take back the Liberator. Elsewhere, Vila is injured and stranded on the planet Chenga where local natives help nurse his wounds until a group of hunters called "Hitechs" capture him and take him back to their base. Cally, aboard a Chengan rescue ship, is taken there as well along with Servalan, who brokers a deal with the Chengans to let her go. Vila and Cally are unknowingly taken for organ harvesting, but are teleported aboard Liberator before they can be killed. With Vila and Cally safely back on Liberator, Avon formally introduces two new crew members Dayna Mellanby and Del Tarrant to the team. Note: This episode was repeated on BBC1 on Monday 8 June 1981 at 7:15 p.m. Guest Stars: Michael Sheard (as Klegg), John Hollis (as Lom), Primi Townsend (as Zee), Julia Vidler (as Barr), Michael Crane (as Mall), Doyne Bird (as Harmon), Catherine Chase (as Nurse), Helen Blatch (as Receptionist)
3.3 (29)	"Volcano"	Desmond McCarthy	Allan Prior	21 January 1980	9.0 (41)
Avon and Tarrant seek out a base of operations on the volcanic planet Obsidian. Dayna and Tarrant teleport down to contact the pacifist inhabitants. However their leader Hower says none would be willing to help. His son betrays their pacifist ideals by contacting a remnant Federation battle group commanded by none other than Servalan herself. Servalan devises an elaborate plan to capture the Liberator in orbit above the planet with a sneak attack. Meanwhile, Federation soldiers teleport aboard with bracelets stolen from Tarrant and Dayna. They try to take over the ship, but Avon covertly orders Zen to attack the battle group as they close in for capture. The battle group retreats and the soldiers flee back to the planet but steal Orac and kidnap Cally in the process. Meanwhile, Tarrant tries to convince the pacifists to help them or else face slavery under Federation control, but Hower is confident that their threat to self-destruct their own world with a nuclear device will prevent any invasion attempt. Tarrant and Dayna rescue Cally and Orac and return to the Liberator. Servalan's battle fleet has regrouped and attacks Obsidian, but Hower detonates the nuclear device and destroys the planet. Guest Stars: Michael Gough (as Hower), Malcolm Bullivant (as Bershar), Ben Howard (as Mori), Alan Bowerman (as Battle fleet commander), Judy Matheson (as Mutoid), Russell Denton (as Milus)
3.4 (30)	"Dawn of the Gods"	Desmond McCarthy	James Follett	28 January 1980	8.9 (39)
Curious about an anomalous black hole that lacks x-ray emissions, Orac takes control of the Liberator and sends the ship into it. Certain they will be killed, the crew tries to stop Orac until Liberator suddenly stops in a dark void. There, Cally's mind is contacted by a mythical being named Thaarn. Vila goes outside to investigate and finds the ship has landed among a graveyard of other spaceships. He is soon attacked by a machine designed to extract the Herculanium alloy of which much of the Liberator's hull is comprised. The rest of the crew head out discovering they are in fact on an artificial planet called Krandor and they are soon taken prisoner by a man called the Caliph and set to work as slaves. Meanwhile, Cally is taken before the mysterious Thaarn who wishes to share rule of the universe with her. Orac is left alone aboard the Liberator and is able to prevent its destruction, while Cally deceives Thaarn and damages the energy control device that was disabling their technology. Avon and Tarrant convince a man named Groff to reverse the gravity field holding the Liberator in place, allowing its escape and ultimately destroying Krandor. However Thaarn also escapes in a spacecraft. Guest Stars: Sam Dastor (as The Caliph), Marcus Powell (as Thaarn), Terry Scully (as Groff)
3.5 (31)	"The Harvest of Kairos"	Gerald Blake	Ben Steed	4 February 1980	9.4 (31)
Servalan once again tries to ambush and take the Liberator, but Tarrant predicts her tactics and manages to outwit her battle plan. Speaking out against Servalan's incompetence is Jarvik, a subordinate construction worker who believes that as a man who is non-reliant on computerised battle planning, he has better intuition for hunting down someone like Tarrant, who was a former crew mate in the Space Command. Intrigued by the concept, Servalan allows him try. Meanwhile, Tarrant decides to raid a Federation freighter carrying valuable Kairopan crystal, but he heads right into Jarvik's trap and the Liberator is captured. The crew of the Liberator are left marooned on Kairos, a planet where nobody survives after the short crystal harvest season. Most impressed, Servalan offers Jarvik command of the Liberator, but he says he has no interest. Servalan instead offers that he rule the Federation with her, providing he can prove himself worthy against Tarrant man-to-man. He must go to Kairos and retrieve the teleport bracelets of the crew members. On Kairos, Avon soon finds an ancient and barely functional space module that offers the only chance at escape. Jarvik arrives, fights Tarrant for the bracelets, and returns to the Liberator victorious. However, Tarrant launches the space capsule and, using a deception mechanism devised by Avon, convinces Zen and Servalan that they have a superior craft and demands their surrender. Jarvik urges that they ignore the computers, but he is killed and Servalan leaves by teleport, allowing the Liberator to be regained uncontested. Guest Stars: Andrew Burt (as Jarvik), Frank Gatliff (as Dastor), Anthony Gardner (as Shad), Sam Davies (as Carlon), Charles Jamieson (as Guard)
3.6 (32)	"City at the Edge of the World"	Vere Lorrimer	Chris Boucher	11 February 1980	8.8 (36)
Arriving at the planet Kezarn, Tarrant sends Vila down to meet a contact who would supply them with crystals needed for Liberator's weapons, but once down he is instead captured by a notorious outlaw named "Bayban the Butcher" and his accomplice Kerril. Vila is then taken to the ruins of an ancient city where Bayban forces him to open an impenetrable door to an area that a local native named Norl says "contains this world and the next", but which Bayban believes leads to a vast treasure. Realising they've been set up, the other Liberator crew teleport down to find Vila. Meanwhile, Vila gets the door open and he and Kerill step through, only to be sent to a room on an ancient spaceship via an advanced matter transporter. Eventually they discover the ship had landed on an Eden-like world and the transport machine was built so the inhabitants of Kezarn could one day colonise it. Norl later tells Vila that he fulfilled the prophecy that a "clever" man would help lead the way for his people. Vila declines to leave with Kerril for the new planet and narrowly escapes being killed by an enraged Bayban, who destroys the city in a brutish attempt to break down the door. Note: This episode was repeated on BBC1 on Monday 15 June 1981 at 7:20 p.m. Guest Stars: Colin Baker (as Bayban), Carol Hawkins (as Kerril), Valentine Dyall (as Norl), John J. Carney (as Sherm)
3.7 (33)	"Children of Auron"	Andrew Morgan	Roger Parkes	19 February 1980	10.4 (25)
Servalan unleashes a deadly plague upon Cally's home world of Auron in another elaborate scheme to lure the Liberator for capture. Cally receives a psychic distress call from her twin sister, Zelda and the rest of the Liberator crew rush to help stop the deadly disease. At the same time, Servalan wants to use the Aurons' cloning technology to create clones in her likeness. In a side plot, two of Servalan's officers, Deral and Ginka, the latter having been passed over for promotion by the other, compete for Servalan's favour. Ginka then uses the current situation with the Auronar to eliminate his rival. Guest Stars: Ric Young (as Ginka), Rio Fanning (as Deral), Sarah Atkinson (as Franton), Jan Chappell (as Zelda), Jack McKenzie (as Patar), Michael Troughton (as Pilot Four Zero), Ronald Leigh-Hunt (as CA One), Beth Harris (as CA Two)
3.8 (34)	"Rumours of Death"	Fiona Cumming	Chris Boucher	25 February 1980	9.0 (33)
On Earth, Avon allows himself to be captured and imprisoned for five days – all in an elaborate scheme to get close to the vicious Federation interrogator named Shrinker, who – he believes – killed his former lover Anna Grant. When the others come to rescue him, Avon abducts Shrinker, who reveals that another agent, Bartholomew – who under Servalan's orders infiltrated Avon's criminal network – may be Anna's real killer. The only lead Avon gets regarding the identity of Bartholomew is that only "Chesku" and Servalan would know of his identity. Meanwhile, Servalan's new presidential palace is infiltrated by resistance forces led by Sula, Chesku's wife, who betrays and kills him. Avon tracks down Servalan and finds her imprisoned by the resistance forces. Sula turns out to be Anna, still alive, and Avon concludes that the only way she could have escaped is if she herself was Bartholomew. Anna attempts to kill Avon but is killed by him instead. Avon escapes as the Federation forces arrive to rescue Servalan. Note: This episode was repeated on BBC1 on Monday 22 June 1981 at 7:15 p.m. Guest Stars: Lorna Heilbron (as Sula), John Bryans (as Shrinker), Peter Clay (as Chesku), Donald Douglas (as Grenlee), David Haig (as Forres), David Gilles (as Hob), Philip Bloomfield (as Balon)
3.9 (35)	"Sarcophagus"	Fiona Cumming	Tanith Lee	3 March 1980	9.9 (22)
The Liberator comes across a derelict alien ship and Avon, Vila and Cally teleport over to investigate. They find the ship has only one deck and contains a corpse and a strange artefact. After Cally accidentally triggers a self-destruct, all three hurry back to the Liberator and bring the artefact with them. The device then unleashes a ghostly presence that stalks the ship. It takes over Cally's mind, sending her into unconsciousness, then shuts down both Zen and Orac and drains the ship's power systems. All the while the rest of the crew experience strange poltergeist-like happenings and finally confront the spirit, who assumes Cally's likeness. They then look for a means to destroy the entity before it enslaves them all. Note: This episode was repeated on BBC1 on Monday 29 June 1981 at 7:15 p.m. Guest Star: Jan Chappell (as The Alien)
3.10 (36)	"Ultraworld"	Vere Lorrimer	Trevor Hoyle	10 March 1980	9.2 (28)
The Liberator comes across a mysterious artificial planet that Cally is drawn to and the rest of the crew chase after her; except for Vila who stays behind with Orac. The others find the world to be one massive computer system ran by a group of aliens called the Ultra who wipe the minds of trespassers and turns them into slave "menials", or processes them for food. Cally and Avon are captured and the Ultra who, impressed with the knowledge the two offer, download their minds into storage cells that Tarrant and Dayna try to get back. Meanwhile, the Ultra force the Liberator to land in a hangar and tap into the computer system. Vila is then encouraged by Orac to recite numerous tongue-twisters and nonsense sayings, all the while, Orac feeds the monologues into the Ultraworld computer—a massive brain at the centre of the complex. The riddles overload the brain's logic systems; the brain shuts down, thus allowing the others to make their escape. Note: This episode was repeated on BBC1 on Monday 6 July 1981 at 7:20 p.m. Guest Stars: Peter Richards (as Ultra 1), Stephen Jenn (as Ultra 2), Ian Barritt (as Ultra 3), Ronald Govey (as Relf)
3.11 (37)	"Moloch"	Vere Lorrimer	Ben Steed	17 March 1980	10.4 (22)
The crew of the Liberator has followed Servalan's ship to the edge of known space where it suddenly disappears from view. The crew discover it has slipped behind an invisibility screen that hides a planet called Sardos whose inhabitants have advanced matter replication technology. Tarrant and Vila manage to sneak down to the planet by teleporting aboard an incoming freighter piloted by a drunken crew of fugitives. Meanwhile, Servalan has arrived under the invitation of Section Leader Grose, who plans to replicate Servalan's cruiser into a fleet of warships. This would be good news for Servalan, however she quickly learns Grose has shifted loyalties and now serves a mysterious intelligence called "Moloch" which has its own plans for the control and rebuilding of the Federation. Guest Stars: John Hartley (as Grose), Mark Sheridan (as Lector), Davyd Harries (as Doran), Sabina Franklyn (as Chesil), Debbi Blythe (as Poola), Deep Roy (as Moloch)
3.12 (38)	"Death-Watch"	Gerald Blake	Chris Boucher	24 March 1980	8.9 (29)
The planets Teal and Vandor are locked in an endless war whose battles are decided periodically by representatives from both worlds fighting to the death in one-on-one combat. Their battleground is a computer-simulated environment on a neutral planet, which is vidcast throughout the galaxy as a popular form of entertainment called Death-Watch. On the Liberator, Vila convinces the others to tune in and watch the latest combat, where Tarrant discovers that one of the fighters is his estranged brother Deeta, a skilled gunman who is fighting on behalf of Teal. When Avon learns that Servalan has been selected as the neutral arbiter, he suspects foul play, and Tarrant tries to warn Deeta. However, Tarrant arrives late; Deeta has already begun the match with his opponent Vinni, who manages to gun him down. Tarrant investigates how Deeta could have been defeated so easily, and Orac determines that Vinni is not a human, but a sophisticated android. To prove this, Tarrant decides to face Vinni in a revenge match over Deeta's death. Note: This episode was repeated on BBC1 on Monday 13 July 1981 at 7:15 p.m. Guest Stars: Steven Pacey (as Deeta Tarrant), Stewart Bevan (as Max), Paul Mark Elliott (as Vinni), Katherine Iddon (as Karla), David Sibley (as Commentator)
3.13 (39)	"Terminal"	Mary Ridge	Terry Nation	31 March 1980	10.0 (26)
Without explanation, Avon follows a series of secret messages to the artificial planet Terminal—an experiment, created 411 years previously but later abandoned, to study the accelerated evolution of life on Earth. While en route, the Liberator passes through a strange cloud of fluidic particles that, unbeknownst to the crew, begin to eat through the hull. Arriving at Terminal, Avon, who refuses to divulge what is going on, teleports down alone. Tarrant and Cally quickly follow to see what he is up to. Avon soon comes upon an underground base where he is captured by guards, but he later escapes and finds a bearded Blake in a medical recovery room on life support. In orbit, Vila and Dayna deal with the Liberator as the ship begins to fall apart. On the planet, Avon eventually discovers Servalan is behind the messages in an elaborate ruse to get her hands on the Liberator. She agrees to hand over Blake for the Liberator, but does not know the ship is doomed. Likewise, Avon is unaware that the Blake he met was only an illusion. Once Servalan's treachery is revealed, it is too late and she finally obtains the Liberator. Vila finally collects Orac from the crumbling Liberator to reunite with Avon, Cally, Dayna and Tarrant. However, before she can leave orbit, the ship begins to break up. As Servalan tries to escape by using the teleport system, the Liberator explodes, leaving its now-stranded crew to find a way off Terminal. Note: This episode was repeated on BBC1 on Monday 20 July 1981 at 7:20 p.m. Guest Stars: Gareth Thomas (as Roj Blake), Gillian McCutcheon (as Kostos), Richard Clifford (as Toron), Heather Wright (as Reeval), David Healy (as Sphere voice) Note: Last regular appearance of Jan Chappell as Cally.

=== Series 4 (1981) ===
Series 4 aired on BBC1, Mondays, mostly 7:15 p.m., 28 September 1981 to 21 December 1981. Producer: Vere Lorrimer. It averaged 8.49 million viewers on original airing in the UK, with an average chart position of 74, a drop of about a million viewers on that of Series 3, and a chart position on par with that of Series 2.

No.	Title	Directed by	Written by	Original release date	UK viewers (in millions) chart position in brackets
4.1 (40)	"Rescue"	Mary Ridge	Chris Boucher	28 September 1981	7.8 (75)
With the Liberator destroyed, the crew are stranded on the mysterious planet Terminal. They soon discover that Servalan had booby-trapped both the ship she left and the underground base with explosives. When they detonate, Cally is killed in the ensuing explosion. The detonation also begins triggering chain reactions through the entire planet, which slowly begins to break up. However, the survivors are rescued by a salvage operator named Dorian, who arrives in his ship, Scorpio. Dorian takes them back to his elaborate underground base on the planet Xenon, where they meet his partner Soolin, a beautiful but deadly gunslinger. The team are also impressed with Dorian's handguns, which are far more versatile than their own hand weapons from the Liberator. Once settled in, Dorian sabotages the team's weapons and then reveals his plans for Orac to help build a working teleport system for his ship. He also holds another dark secret: he deliberately brought the Liberator crew to his base plans to sacrifice them (and Soolin) to a life-draining entity that lurks in the caverns below the base. In return, the Gestalt creature enables the centuries-old Dorian to remain youthful. However, Vila helps the crew escape their fate and both the creature and Dorian are killed. Note: This episode was inspired by Oscar Wilde's The Picture of Dorian Gray. Introducing: Glynis Barber as Soolin, Peter Tuddenham as voice of Slave; Guest Stars: Geoffrey Burridge (as Dorian), Rob Middleton (as Creature)
4.2 (41)	"Power"	Mary Ridge	Ben Steed	5 October 1981	8.7 (60)
With Dorian dead and Soolin missing, the rest of the crew find themselves trapped in the underground base with the only means of escape, the freighter Scorpio, locked behind an impenetrable security door that Vila cannot open. Matters are complicated further when Vila discovers a "nuclear compression bomb" planted by Dorian and the timer is counting down. Meanwhile, on the surface of the planet, Avon is captured by the Hommicks, a native tribe of men who are in the midst of a gender war with a nearly extinct female tribe called the Seska who possess telekinetic powers enhanced by rare dynamon crystals. Eventually, their leader Pella helps to disable the bomb in the base, but once the door is opened she tries to take the Scorpio for herself. Avon, with help from Orac, uses the Seska's dynamon crystal to complete Dorian's teleporter and manages to kill Pella. Afterward, Soolin comes out of hiding and agrees to join Avon's group. Guest Stars: Dicken Ashworth (as Gunn Sar), Juliet Hammond-Hill (as Pella), Jenny Oulton (as Nina), Alison Glennie (as Kate), Paul Ridley (as Cato), Linda Barr (as Luxia)
4.3 (42)	"Traitor"	David Sullivan Proudfoot	Robert Holmes	12 October 1981	8.7 (59)
The Federation is expanding once again at an alarming rate, and with the annexation of the most recent world Helotrix, Avon decides to go there to find out how the Federation is doing it. He sends Dayna and Tarrant down to spy, and they soon come across a resistance group led by a man named Hunda. It is soon discovered that the Federation is using a swift acting pacification drug, Pylene-50, and the operation is being led by a new security commissioner named Sleer. With Hunda's help, Tarrant and Dayna make contact with Leitz, a Federation officer who has been leaking information to the resistance. Leitz reveals where the drug is being made and a possible antidote, and Tarrant decides to put a stop to it despite Avon's orders not to get involved. However, Leitz is not a traitor after all, but acting under Sleer's orders to set up an ambush. When the trap is sprung, Tarrant and Dayna finally catch a glimpse of the mysterious Commissioner Sleer – who is revealed to be Servalan. Guest Stars: Malcolm Stoddard (as Leitz), Christopher Neame (as Colonel Quute), Robert Morris (as Major Hunda), Edgar Wreford (as Forbus), John Quentin (as Practar), Nick Brimble (as General), Neil Dickson (as Avandir), David Quilter (as The Tracer), Cyril Appleton (as Sgt. Hask), George Lee (as Igen)
4.4 (43)	"Stardrive"	David Sullivan Proudfoot	James Follett	19 October 1981	8.8 (65)
The crew tries to sneak into a heavily patrolled system to look for fuel. Knowing the Scorpio is too slow, Avon decides to drift alongside an asteroid to avoid detection, but instead collides with it during the risky manoeuvre. While carrying out repair work, the crew witness three Federation ships explode by no apparent cause. Analysing the explosions, it is discovered that the ships were attacked by a very fast-moving spacecraft. Orac identifies the ships as a "space chopper" and theorises it to use an experimental photon drive developed by a former Federation scientist named Dr. Plaxton. Avon decides to obtain the drive for Scorpio, but to get one, they have to find Plaxton who is working for the "Space Rats" – a gang of crazed delinquents who reside on the planet Caspar. Guest Stars: Barbara Shelley (as Dr. Plaxton), Damien Thomas (as Atlan), Peter Sands (as Bomber), Leonard Kavanagh (as Napier)
4.5 (44)	"Animals"	Mary Ridge	Allan Prior	26 October 1981	8.9 (59)
Dayna and Tarrant arrive at the planet Bucol II, where Dayna tracks down a former colleague of her father, a genetic scientist named Justin. Once down, she is attacked by strange humanoid beasts until Justin saves her. In orbit, the Scorpio comes under attack by Federation ships and Tarrant is forced to abandon Dayna and flee back to base for repairs. Back on Bucol, Dayna tries to convince Justin into helping synthesise an antidote to the Federation's pacification drug, but is appalled by his former work in creating genetic super-soldiers for the Federation, evidence of which are the beasts he created. Meanwhile, Servalan learns about Justin's secret project on Bucol and goes there to investigate. She manages to capture Dayna and brainwashes her into helping capture her friend. Note: This episode was inspired by H. G. Wells's The Island of Dr Moreau. Guest Stars: Peter Byrne (as Justin), Kevin Stoney (as Ardus), David Boyce (as Og), Max Harvey (as Borr), William Lindsay (as Captain), Ralph Morse (as Animal)
4.6 (45)	"Headhunter"	Mary Ridge	Roger Parkes	2 November 1981	8.9 (64)
Vila and Tarrant arrive at Pharos to pick up Dr. Muller, a brilliant cyberneticist that Avon hopes to recruit to their cause. Once aboard the Scorpio, Muller reacts violently to a mysterious box Tarrant brings back with them. Vila tries to subdue Muller but ends up killing him when he strikes him with a wrench. Muller's body is put into a cryogenic capsule, but soon Scorpio loses power and life support. While the ship is stranded in orbit of Xenon, Tarrant and Vila are rescued by the others, but Muller, who was thought to be dead, has disappeared. It is soon learned that Muller is really an unstoppable android that killed its creator and took his severed head to trick everyone. The robot sneaks down to the base and plans to somehow "merge" with Orac, hoping their combined AI powers will make them invincible. The only solution to stop it may be the contents of the strange box—the android's real head. Guest Stars: John Westbrook (as Muller), Lynda Bellingham (as Vena), Nick Joseph (as Android), Douglas Fielding (as Technician), Lesley Nunnerley (as Voice)
4.7 (46)	"Assassin"	David Sullivan Proudfoot, Vere Lorrimer (uncredited)	Rod Beacham	9 November 1981	8.8 (71)
The Scorpio crew goes to the slaver planet Domo with information that Servalan has hired a notorious assassin named "Cancer" to eliminate them. Almost nothing is known of this killer, not even what he looks like, but only that he has an infallible record. Avon allows himself to be captured as a slave in hopes of intercepting Servalan first, but he is too late as Cancer has already left the planet. With the help of a slave named Nebrox, Avon escapes and tracks down Cancer's ship where he and Tarrant teleport aboard. They find Cancer with a young slave girl named Piri and manage to take him prisoner. Avon then plans to wait for Servalan believing she will arrive to give Cancer his payment, but instead they have fallen for an elaborate trap when the assassin reveals their true identity. Guest Stars: Richard Hurndall (as Nebrox), Caroline Holdaway (as Piri), Betty Marsden (as Verlis), John Wyman (as Cancer), John Attard (as Benos), Adam Blackwood (as Tok), Mark Barratt (as Servalan's captain)
4.8 (47)	"Games"	Vivienne Cozens	Bill Lyons	16 November 1981	8.0 (95)
A man named Belkov, who enjoys sophisticated games of skill, is running a Feldon crystal extraction operation on Mecron II for Servalan. In reality, he's ripping her off by taking a large cut of the crystal for himself, which has unlimited energy potential and far more valuable than diamond. Servalan suspects Belkov's treachery and threatens to kill him, but not before learning where he has hidden the crystal. In the meantime, Belkov has contacted Avon promising the stolen crystal in exchange for rescuing him. As always, Avon remains suspicious as Belkov is using the rescue plan to instead pin the missing crystal on the Scorpio crew. Guest Stars: Stratford Johns (as Belkov), Rosalind Bailey (as Gambit), David Neal (as Gerren), James Harvey (as Guard)
4.9 (48)	"Sand"	Vivienne Cozens	Tanith Lee	23 November 1981	8.3 (87)
Servalan arrives at the planet Virn—a world covered in strange green sand—to find out what happened to a group of Federation researchers who went missing five years earlier, soon after uncovering a substance with unique energy potential. The Scorpio crew follow her to the planet, curious to find out what she is up to. When Servalan arrives, her ship is disabled and her associate, Investigator Reeve, turns against her. She finds herself alone until encountering Tarrant, who teleported down with Dayna to track her. The two must work together to survive and find shelter in a bunker against the green sand, which seems to be a living, intelligent lifeform. Meanwhile, a strange energy storm cripples Scorpio preventing it from performing a rescue. Guest Stars: Stephen Yardley (as Reeve), Daniel Hill (as Chasgo), Jonathan David (as Keller), Peter Craze (as Servalan's assistant), Michael Gaunt (as Computer)
4.10 (49)	"Gold"	Brian Lighthill	Colin Davis	30 November 1981	8.0 (86)
Keiller, an old acquaintance of Avon, informs him of the secret transport of gold from the planet Zerok to the Federation via a passenger liner, the Space Princess. Keiller plans to steal the gold but needs help, and offers Avon and the others a cut of the loot. However, the scheme involves getting the gold off Zerok before it is processed into "black gold"—an atomically altered version that is worthless until it is converted back into normal gold via an encoded computer process. Keiller leads the break-in of the Zerok facility, but the team is ambushed as the guards have been tipped off—a set-up by Servalan. Avon decides to hijack the next black gold shipment from the Princess itself and sell it back to Servalan. Guest Stars: Roy Kinnear (as Keiller), Anthony Brown (as Doctor), Dinah May (as Woman passenger), Norman Hartley (as Pilot)
4.11 (50)	"Orbit"	Brian Lighthill	Robert Holmes	7 December 1981	8.0 (91)
A renegade scientist named Egrorian summons Avon to the hostile planet Malodar with an offer Avon cannot refuse. Avon shuttles down with Vila, and meets the scientist and his assistant Pinder. They are given a demonstration of Egrorian's "Tachyon Funnel", a powerful weapon that can destroy anything in the universe by harnessing the power of super-dense stellar matter; all Egrorian wants as trade is Orac. Avon reluctantly considers the deal, but returns later with a duplicate Orac; Egrorian hands over the weapon system. Servalan is secretly behind the transfer, and while Avon and Vila shuttle back to Scorpio, Egrorian discovers the traded Orac is a fake. However, he has rigged the shuttle to crash; Avon is faced with jettisoning the weapon as well as Vila in order to reduce the weight of the ship to reach escape velocity. Note: This episode was inspired by Tom Godwin's The Cold Equations. Guest Stars: John Savident (as Egrorian), Larry Noble (as Pinder)
4.12 (51)	"Warlord"	Viktors Ritelis	Simon Masters	14 December 1981	8.5 (74)
Avon calls a meeting on Xenon between the five most powerful factions resisting the Federation. One of the members, Zukan, the leader of planet Betafarl, is secretly working for Servalan and has sabotaged the base with planted bombs and also unleashed a radioactive virus that will kill any survivors. Once Zukan departs, the bombs detonate, but unbeknownst to him, his daughter Zeeona—who is Tarrant's lover—had stayed behind on the base. Zukan himself is then double-crossed by Servalan who had planted a bomb on his ship and sent it spinning out of control. On Scorpio, Avon and Soolin return to Xenon to save the others, but time is running out. Their only hope may be in helping Zukan first, who is the only one who knows how to stop the virus. Note: This episode features the last appearance of Jacqueline Pearce as Servalan. Guest Stars: Roy Boyd (as Zukan), Bobbie Brown (as Zeeona), Dean Harris (as Finn), Simon Merrick (as Boorva), Rick James (as Chalsa), Charles Augins (as Lod), Brian Spink (as Mida)
4.13 (52)	"Blake"	Mary Ridge	Chris Boucher	21 December 1981	9.0 (77)
Afraid that the Federation knows the location of Xenon base, the Scorpio crew destroy what is left of it. Avon then reveals that he has pondered the finding of a new leader for their resistance that everyone will support and he believes that person is none other than Blake himself. Orac believes he is alive and has tracked him to the formerly lawless world of Gauda Prime. Arriving there, Scorpio is attacked by patrol ships and is forced down. Tarrant stays behind to stabilise the ship and everyone else teleports down to the surface. Meanwhile, Blake, who is alive and posing as a bounty hunter, rescues Tarrant from the wreck and brings him back to base. There, he learns Tarrant is part of Avon's rebel team and implies to Tarrant that he plans to turn them in to the Federation for the bounty. Tarrant manages to get away, not realising that Blake is simply testing his loyalty. Tarrant meets Avon and the others and they confront Blake. Before Blake can convince Avon he's still on their side, Avon shoots and kills him. Suddenly, a squad of Federation troops ambush them and shoot everyone down save for Avon. Avon does not surrender, but stands over Blake's body, raises his gun and smiles. The screen goes to the end credits with the sound of guns firing. The fate of Orac is unknown. Guest Stars: Gareth Thomas (as Roj Blake), David Collings (as Deva), Sasha Mitchell (as Arlen), Janet Lees Price (as Klyn) (wife of actor Paul Darrow, who played Avon). Note: Final episode.

== See also ==
- History of Blake's 7
