= List of Blake's 7 characters =

This is a list of characters from Blake's 7, a British sci-fi drama set in a fictional spaceship Liberator, first broadcast on 2 January 1978 created by Terry Nation.

== Kerr Avon ==
Paul Darrow
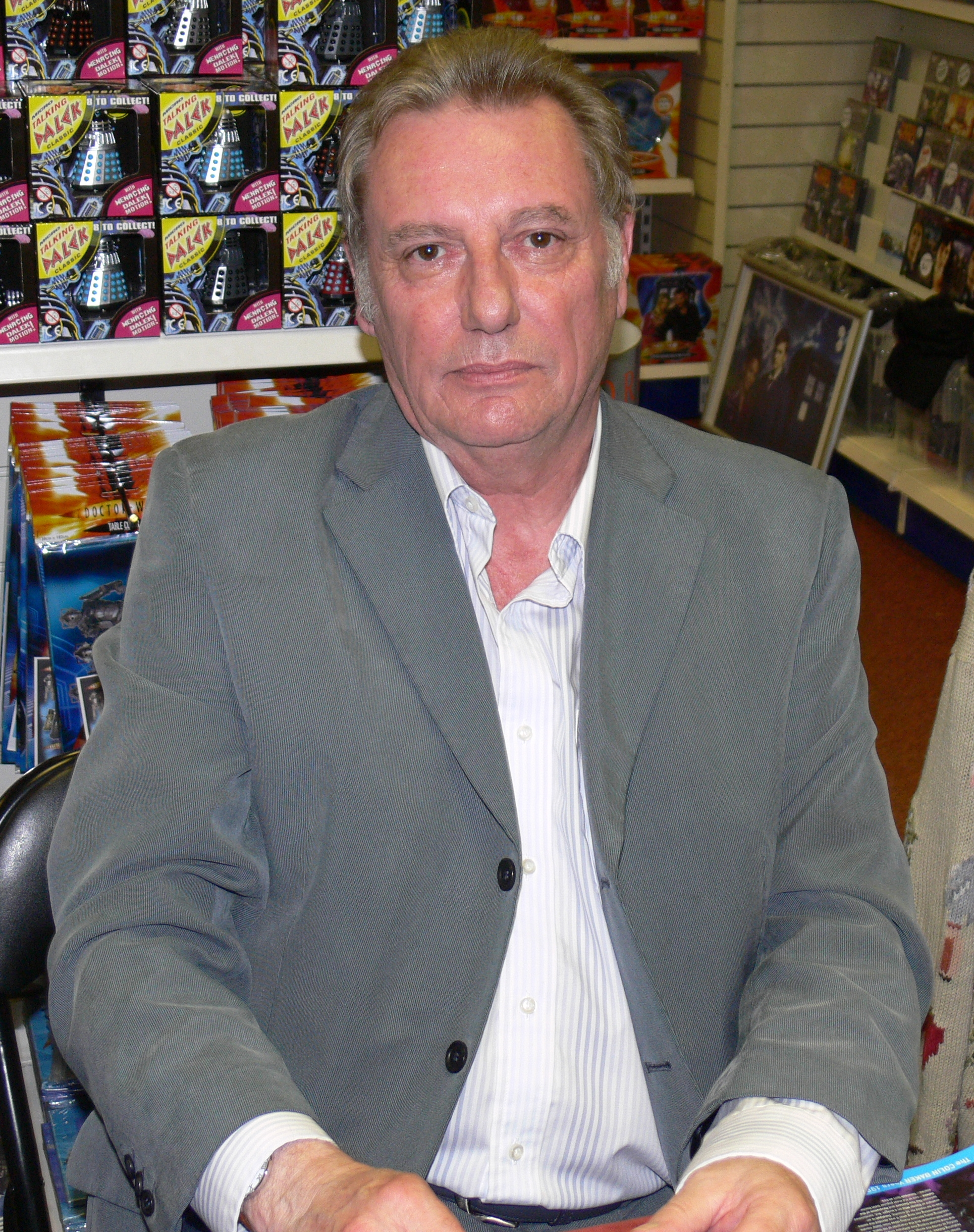

Kerr Avon is played by Paul Darrow (who was recreating the role for the Big Finish Liberator Chronicles and Classic Audio Adventures. In the B7 audio series, Avon is played by Colin Salmon). Initially one of a character ensemble, he increasingly became a lead character. Avon quickly became the show's breakout character, owing to his darker nature, unclear motives, and sardonic wit. Darrow's portrayal led to his being permanently associated with the character; and the actor wrote a novel (Avon: A Terrible Aspect) that examined the early years of the character prior to the TV series.

A child of the colonies, Avon possesses genius-level intelligence, and is an aloof and sardonic computer expert found guilty of an attempt to embezzle five hundred million credits from the Terran Federation banking system. First seen in the second episode, "Space Fall", as a prisoner aboard the London, a cargo vessel transporting a group of convicted criminals to the penal colony on the planet Cygnus Alpha, he assists Blake in his attempted mutiny on the journey, using his skills to take over the ship's computer. He subsequently boards the Liberator along with Blake and Jenna, and becomes a member of the original "seven".

Avon acts self-serving but in reality, when it comes to actions, he is more selfless than any of the others, constantly saving the lives of almost everyone he comes across and including the entire crew several times over, with nothing to gain for himself.

He is a cautious man, tending to think first before he leaps. As a result, he doesn't take many uncalculated risks.

Avon has a contentious relationship with Servalan in season three. During the episode "Aftermath", Servalan offers Avon the chance to rule the Federation by her side; however, regardless of whether she is serious or not, Avon pointedly refuses, shoving her to the ground during their embrace and stating, "I'd be dead within a week." In the episode "Rumours of Death", Avon takes pity upon Servalan who is chained to a wall; similarly, it is she who reveals to him the truth about Anna Grant but still intends to dispose of him.

Vila says he "feels safe" with Avon, but in the third-to-last episode, "Orbit", Vila overhears Avon's decision after a suggestion by Orac to sacrifice Vila so the shuttle that they are aboard must be lightened to achieve a safe orbit. This sacrifice is avoided when Avon discovers an alternative solution.

In the series finale, Avon and the crew rediscover Blake, who appears to be working as a Federation bounty hunter. Avon reacts badly to the knowledge that Blake has apparently betrayed them all, and responds by shooting Blake. He later discovers that Blake's role as bounty hunter was a masquerade, as revealed by a real Federation agent who herself (unbeknown to Blake), was masquerading as Blake's rebel accomplice. Having witnessed the massacre of Vila, Tarrant, Dayna and Soolin, Avon's final action is uncertain. He smiles as he raises his gun. The screen goes black and seven gunshot sound effects are heard.

Avon's first name is usually given as 'Kerr', with a double r. However, it is occasionally spelled 'Ker'; in Darrow's noncanonical novel Avon: A Terrible Aspect, this is explained as a short form of his full name 'Kerguelen', roughly meaning "desolation".

=== Avon's possible survival ===
It was in the contract of actor Gareth Thomas that Blake's death should be totally unambiguous. Therefore, a different type of gun was used by Avon as well as showing blood and Blake's dead body. By comparison, the apparent deaths of the regular characters at the end of the fourth series are less clearcut, with Avon last seen still standing and the others shot down with weapons that produce no visible injury—in the case of Vila, not even being shown having any weapon pointed at him, nor any onscreen shot fired at him, unlike his crewmates and guard casualties. The ambiguous ending was arranged so that the characters played by those actors who wished to stay on for the proposed fifth series would only be stunned or wounded. The absence of the characters of those who did not would be explained by their having been killed. The end credit sequence for the final episode of the fourth series begins with the sound of a single shot followed by several others in quick succession, before the theme music fades in.

Beyond the series, a number of licensed works have portrayed some of the Scorpio crew having survived the finale. The 1984 non-canonical tie-in novel Afterlife tells of how both Avon and Vila survived the shoot-out on Gauda Prime and, after some time travelling with Korell, Avon's former jailor on Gauda Prime, end up on a new ship (captained by Avon's sister, Tor Avon, just as tyrannical as Servalan) which was christened Blake's 7.

Paul Darrow purchased the rights to the show and was originally part of the early 2000s project which would have been called Blake's 7: A Legacy Reborn. Reportedly, Darrow would have made an appearance as an aged Avon in what he described as "Napoleonic Exile" on a penal planet, his exploits long forgotten, most or all of the others long dead. (This scenario is close to one described by Blake's 7 creator Terry Nation.) Avon would have passed the torch on to a new group of escaped prisoners who would become the new Seven. Avon might have become their leader or instead died; this was not clearly stated. Owing to creative differences, Darrow left the project; and since the actor's death in 2019 there has been no further news about the idea.

Kaldor City, a spin-off audio play series featuring elements from both Doctor Who and Blake's 7 created by Chris Boucher, who had written for both series, features the character of Kaston Iago, played by Darrow, widely thought to be Avon under an alias for Avon. (Under copyright law, Boucher did not have the legal right to make use of Avon, a character he did not create.) Lance Parkin's 2012 edition of his Doctor Who book A History: An Unofficial History of the Doctor Who Universe includes speculation as to how Avon/Iago could have survived the ending of "Blake" by shooting out the Gauda Prime base lights then dropping to the ground and letting the guards confusedly shoot each other down.

The 2013 novel Lucifer, written by Darrow, was released in both printed and audiobook (read by Darrow, ISBN 978-1-78178-110-4) It posits that Avon alone survived and picks up his adventures 20 years afterwards. The old Federation has fallen to be reformed under the leadership of the four leaders known as the Quartet, in an uneasy alliance. Old enemies (including Servalan) and new ones (including Gabriella, Travis' daughter) appear.

== Roj Blake ==
Roj Blake
- Blake's 7 character
- First appearance: The Way Back
- Last appearance: Star One (Regular); Blake (Guest appearance)
- Portrayed by: Gareth Thomas

In-universe information
- Species: Human
- Gender: Male
- Affiliation: Resistance

Roj Blake is played by Gareth Thomas, who later reprised his role in the Big Finish Productions audio stories. (In the B7 audio series, Blake is played by Derek Riddell).

A native of Earth, Roj Blake was a leading voice against the corrupt, oppressive Terran Federation approximately four years before the series began. He was captured by Federation forces, led by Space Commander Travis, and his resistance group was massacred ("Seek-Locate-Destroy"). Blake was subsequently brainwashed into denouncing his resistance activities, stripped of his memory of the events and placed back into society as an "ideal model citizen" to break the morale of the resistance. His brother and sister were sent to a distant planet but executed on arrival. Forged tapes were sent to Blake periodically to sustain the illusion that they were alive.

In the first episode of the series, "The Way Back", Blake was approached by members of a new resistance organization preparing to strike against the Federation once more. As Blake took time to consider the revelations about his past, he witnessed the massacre of the group by Federation troops. He was captured once again, and the authorities hatched a plan to discredit him by framing him for child molestation and having him sentenced to life on the prison planet Cygnus Alpha. During the journey Blake escaped aboard an abandoned highly advanced spacecraft, the Liberator, with Jenna Stannis and Kerr Avon. He continued to Cygnus Alpha, recruiting Olag Gan and Vila Restal into the group. By the end of the first series, his group had grown with the addition of the telepathic alien Cally and the super-computer Orac.

These resources gave Blake an unprecedented ability to oppose the Federation. Initially committed to freedom with noble intentions, he began to show increasing levels of stress ("Horizon", "Voice From the Past") and to become more fanatical. Blake began to focus on destroying the Federation's control centre, the computers controlling climate and commerce for hundreds of worlds—a scheme that Avon and Cally thought to be morally ambiguous because of the thousands of innocent lives it would cost. His first attempt was also his first big failure—an attack on Earth's Forbidden Zone at the location publicly advertised as Control was actually an empty room. It was revealed that the real control was somewhere secret and that the advertised location was a decoy. This failure resulted in the death of Olag Gan.

When Blake finally reaches Star One — the genuine control nexus — he discovers that Travis has betrayed humanity to the Andromedans. He subsequently ordered his crew to stop the sabotage so that humanity would have the resources of Star One to fight off the invasion. He also asked Avon to use the Liberator to hold off the invasion fleet until the Federation arrived. Arguably, the events in "Star One" represented his ultimate triumph as the Federation won a pyrrhic victory in the intergalactic war that severely reduced their power.

With Thomas seeking an exit from the show at the end of the second series, Blake was written out, disappearing during the Andromedan War; and Avon became leader of the crew. Avon would continue to search for Blake, sometimes with disastrous results ("Terminal"). In the series finale, Avon revealed that he had earlier discovered that Blake was alive and living as a bounty hunter on the planet Gauda Prime. In an attempt to recruit Blake for his purposes, Avon and his team travelled to Gauda Prime; but their ship was damaged by security forces on the way and the crew were forced to abandon it. Tarrant, the pilot, crash-landed on the planet. Blake encountered Tarrant when examining the crashed vessel but did not reveal that he was using the guise of a bounty hunter so that he could test those who claim to be against the Federation, all the while running a large anti-Federation recruitment campaign on Gauda Prime. Tarrant escaped Blake's custody before Blake could explain everything to him. Unfortunately, Tarrant informed Avon of what he believed to be Blake's betrayal. Avon did not wait for an explanation, and shot Blake dead. Avon and his crew were surrounded by Federation troops led by Arlen, Blake's confidant. Arlen explained that Blake "said he could no longer tell who was Federation and who wasn't. He was right. He couldn't". This revealed that Arlen herself was a Federation spy who secretly knew Blake's real agenda.

Thomas returned on the condition that there was no doubt that Blake would die in a definitive manner; it was in his contract for the series finale. At his request, Avon was to use a different type of gun, not one could be mistaken for a stun ray. After his death, blood would be shown along with Blake's dead body. The character's death was gorier than is normal for BBC television at the time slot.

== Cally ==
Cally (played by Jan Chappell) was the only alien amongst the original crew, a native of the planet Auron. She left her home world to help the resistance fighters on Saurian Major and was subsequently exiled by her isolationist people. When a chemical poison was dropped on the rebels, she was the only survivor and was determined to make a suicide attack on the base until she met and joined Blake. She was initially ashamed to return to Auron because she was the only survivor of the resistance.

Cally was the only member of the original crew who was not a convicted criminal. Like other members of the Auron race, Cally was telepathic and her psychic abilities were an asset to the crew. On the other hand, it occasionally made her susceptible to being taken over by telepathic influence ("The Web", "Shadow", "Sarcophagus"). While her initial role was monitoring communications, she also operated medic and pilot. Initially as fanatical as Blake in fighting the Federation, she, along with Gan, became the moral "conscience" of the crew, once even questioning Blake whether destroying Star One was worth the "many many (innocent) people" he would kill as a result. She even questions his entire crusade, wondering if he has made them all 'fanatics', to which Blake becomes defensive. Cally has come a long way from the rebel who would kill until she was killed on Saurian Major, developing the conscience which Blake never showed in his terrorist acts.

While Cally was rather distant and philosophical at first, as the series went on she became more connected to the crew and would display a dry wit on occasion.

Tragedy eventually marks Cally. Servalan, in a gambit to have herself cloned, deliberately infects Auron with a disease to which she alone has the cure. Almost all of the Aurons are killed, including Cally's twin sister Zelda. Cally herself is killed offscreen by Servalan's explosives on Terminal in series-four opener "Rescue".

== Olag Gan ==
Olag Gan
- Blake's 7 character
- First appearance: Spacefall
- Last appearance: Pressure Point
- Portrayed by: David Jackson

In-universe information
- Species: Human
- Gender: Male
- Affiliation: Resistance

Olag Gan is played by David Jackson.

A native of the planet Zephron, Gan killed a Federation officer who killed his girlfriend. He was declared insane and had an implant placed in his brain that made it impossible for him to kill. He was later sentenced to be exiled to Cygnus Alpha. He participated in Roj Blake's escape attempt, but was left behind when Blake escaped on the Liberator. When Blake returned to Cygnus Alpha, Gan and Vila were the only prisoners who both joined him and survived the fight against Vargas.

Courageous and powerfully built, Gan, by his own admission, was not terribly bright. But he was the voice of reason and rustic common sense, so he was far from stupid. His manner was direct, honest and straightforward. Unlike the other more cynical members of the crew, he took things at face value and was not always expecting to be betrayed or double-crossed. He was loyal and selfless in his devotion to Blake's cause, and his raw physical strength was a great asset. Although loyal to Blake, Gan was noticeably outspoken against Blake's plans to ally with Terra Nostra, a drug-dealing organization.

His implant proved to be an occasional problem, preventing him from killing those who were a clear menace to the crew's safety ("Time Squad") and once breaking down and making him attack the crew and the Liberator itself ("Breakdown"). However, the respect the crew had for him was demonstrated when they went to immense risk to have his implant repaired rather than simply kill him.

During the unsuccessful attack on Earth Control, Gan was killed by falling debris after Travis threw a strontium grenade at the group. He died holding a closing door open so that the others could escape. His last words were, "I'm not worth dying for!" as Blake came back for him. He was the first member of the crew to die and the crew, especially Blake, were devastated by the loss. Blake came to believe that Gan died because the crew of the Liberator (he himself, particularly) had started to believe their own legend of invulnerability.

== Dayna Mellanby ==
Dayna Mellanby
- Blake's 7 character
- First appearance: Aftermath
- Last appearance: Blake
- Portrayed by: Josette Simon; Angela Bruce (BBC Radio); Yasmin Bannerman (Big Finish Productions)

In-universe information
- Species: Human
- Gender: Female
- Affiliation: Resistance

Dayna Mellanby is played by Josette Simon. She is the daughter of former resistance leader Hal Mellanby, who fled from Earth with his infant daughter to escape security forces after his movement collapsed. Living in an undersea home on Sarran, she developed a keen interest in all kinds of weapons systems, developing expertise in everything from bows and arrows to sophisticated energy blasters.

In the aftermath of the Intergalactic War, numerous survivors of the battle crash-landed on Sarran, including Kerr Avon, whom Dayna rescued from the primitive Sarran natives. Servalan later crashed on Sarran and joined them in Mellanby's home. Servalan eventually recognised and murdered Mellanby and tried to escape with Orac. During this time, Dayna's adopted sister was killed by the Sarans. Dayna was unable to kill Servalan before the Liberator automatically teleported her and Avon back.

With her father and sister dead, Dayna joined the Liberator crew and resumed her father's fight against the Federation. Having been raised on a backwater planet, Dayna was young, pretty, lively and had a strong sense of humour; she was a marked contrast against the world-weary cynicism of the rest of the crew. She was also capable, determined and good under pressure. At one point, in "Deathwatch", she had a clear chance to kill Servalan but spared her to prevent an interplanetary war. She continued to develop elaborate weapons for the crew with a flair that Tarrant described as "gaudy, but effective".

Dayna showed an initial romantic interest in Avon as he was the first man she'd met in a very long time. On their first meeting she kissed him out of "curiosity", but she quickly cooled to him. She also had a past romantic involvement with an older scientist named Justin. When he was killed by Servalan ("Animals"), she was devastated. This only served to fuel her consuming hatred of Servalan. During the episode "Ultraworld", it is implied that Dayna and Tarrant were about to have sex, so that the human reproductive process could be studied by the planet's inhabitants.

Dayna, unlike the rest of the Scorpio crew, was gunned down by Federation officer Arlen at the start of the final shoot-out on Gauda Prime, and not by Federation troopers.

=== Miscellaneous ===
Marina Sirtis was one of the actresses who auditioned for the role of Dayna.

In 1998 and 1999 Angela Bruce played Dayna in the BBC radio plays The Sevenfold Crown and The Syndeton Experiment.

In 2017 it was announced that the role of Dayna had been recast and would now be played by Yasmin Bannerman for Big Finish Productions.

== Orac ==
Orac
- Blake's 7 character
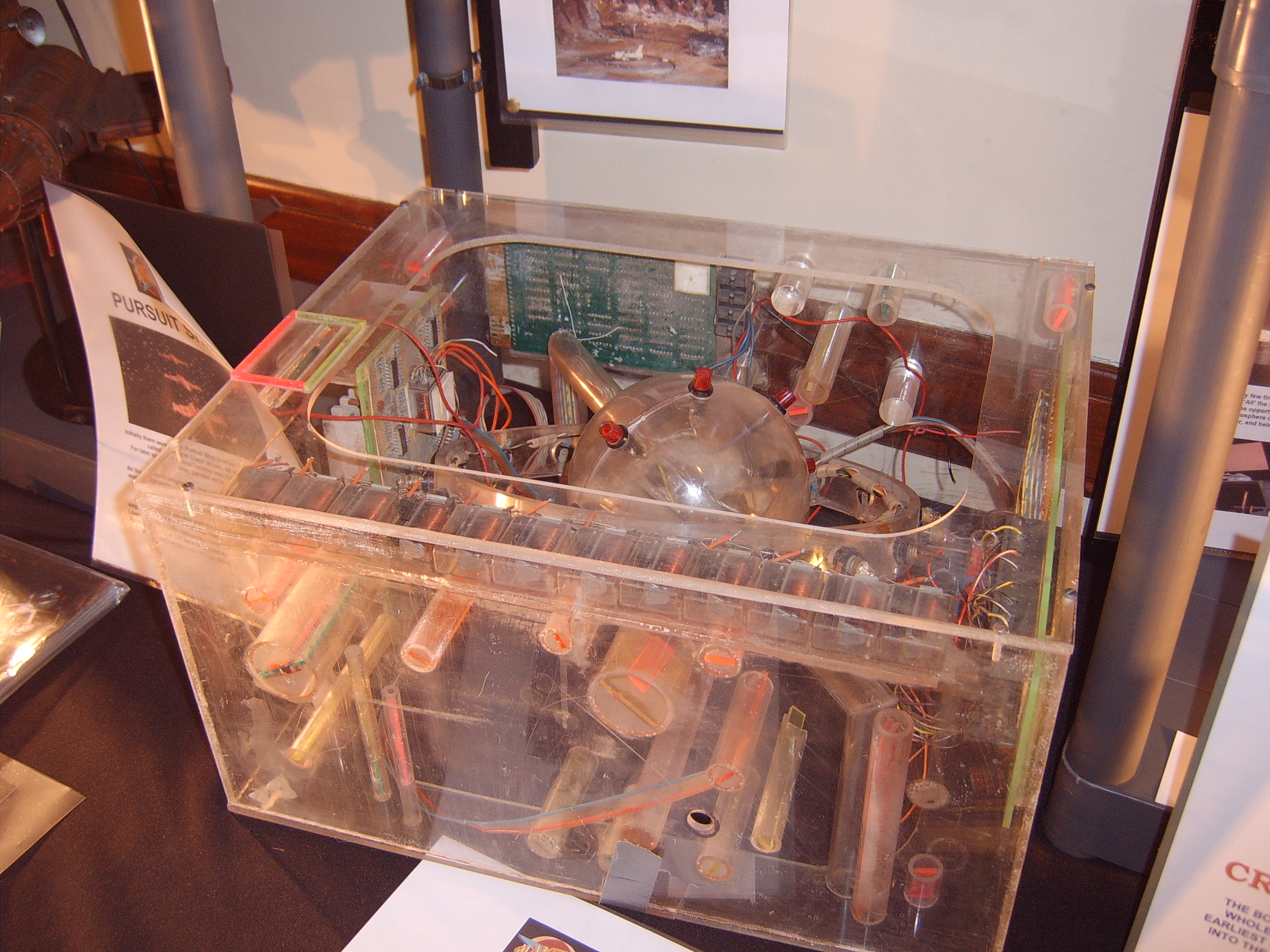
- Orac, at Concussion, the 2006 Eastercon
- First appearance: Orac (1×13)
- Last appearance: Blake (4×13)
- Voiced by: Derek Farr (First appearance 1x13); Peter Tuddenham (series 2 – 4)

In-universe information
- Species: Computer
- Gender: Simulated male
- Affiliation: Resistance

Orac (short for Oracle) is voiced by series regular Peter Tuddenham, except for the series 1 finale "Orac" (which introduced the character) in which the voice is provided by Derek Farr, who played Orac's creator Ensor in that episode. Orac is a highly advanced supercomputer developed by the scientist Ensor, brought aboard the Liberator by Blake and Cally at the end of the first series. Ensor was a particularly irascible character and Orac inherited some of his traits: Orac is terse, short-tempered, and frequently unhelpful. Orac is activated by an electronic "key", which is removed by the crew to shut him up if he talks too much.

Orac was invaluable to Blake, Avon, and the crew as an advisor, although on more than one occasion it had been possessed by both alien and robotic intelligence in the television series.

When the Scorpio crew went to Gauda Prime in the series finale, Orac was hidden prior to the final shootout in which the crew appeared to be killed. Orac's survival or whereabouts are unknown.

== Vila Restal ==
Vila Restal
- Blake's 7 character
- First appearance: 1×01: The Way Back
- Last appearance: 4x13: Blake
- Portrayed by: Michael Keating

In-universe information
- Species: Human
- Gender: Male
- Affiliation: Resistance

Vila Restal is played by Michael Keating. The only character to appear in all 52 episodes of the series, Vila was often a more comical character than the others.

A native of Earth and a member of the lowly Delta grade criminal underclass (similar to the classes established in Aldous Huxley's Brave New World), Vila is a petty thief who meets Blake in the detention cell awaiting transport to Cygnus Alpha – and who, while Blake is asleep, picks his pockets.

Vila later participates in a prisoner mutiny aboard the transport ship London. He remains on the London when Blake, Avon and Jenna escape in the Liberator, finally leaving the penal planet Cygnus Alpha with Blake.

Vila is more intelligent than his Delta grade rating suggests. He also claims to have bought a "grade four ignorant" rating to avoid being drafted as a spaceship captain. He is a talented thief who can break into the most sophisticated security systems. This ability makes him useful to Blake's crew; in the episode "City At the Edge of the World", Avon tells Del Tarrant that "... we can easily replace a pilot, but a talented thief is rare."

Vila is often lazy and cowardly, preferring to evade danger. He is the only male member of the crew who is addressed by his first name (as all of the female characters are). He claims he wants "...to live forever, or die trying." Actor Michael Keating described the character as "...a survivor", doing what was necessary to stay alive and not caring as much about the ideals of Blake or the ambitions of Avon. Vila is a poor fighter—his confusion costs the rebels the battle in "Space Fall", and he is momentarily shocked after stabbing a fanatical monk in "Cygnus Alpha".

Vila greatly enjoys drinking and gambling, making the Liberator crew keep him away from situations where his vices could compromise the mission ("Shadow", "Killer", "Gambit"). However, he demonstrates courage and resourcefulness when needed, choosing to join with Blake instead of staying on Cygnus Alpha, grabbing Orac before being teleported off the Liberator in "Terminal", and re-entering the Terminal complex to save Tarrant ("Rescue"). He demonstrates immense skill and heroism in "City at the Edge of the World", where he develops a short-lived but intense romance with Kerril, a female gunfighter.

Vila admires Blake, but possibly his closest friend is Gan, whose honesty he trusts. His relationship with Avon is a mixture of respect and loathing, becoming a prominent aspect of the series. By the final series, Vila and Avon are the only two original members of the Seven left. They share a common cynicism and focus on material success as demonstrated in "Gambit". They clearly respect each other's skills and work together effectively ("Killer"). They often spar over Avon's ruthlessness and Vila's cowardice. In "Space Fall", Vila suggests killing Avon, anticipating that Avon would scheme to have other prisoners thrown out of an airlock. During the fourth-series episode "Orbit", Avon tries to throw Vila out of the airlock of a spaceship that cannot reach its escape velocity. Although another solution is found and they survive the ordeal, the incident damages their relationship.

Vila is fond of attractive women; during Cally's first episode, he calls out to her "Don't shoot, pretty lady!" He sometimes engages in playful, and sometimes more serious, bantering with Cally, Dayna and Soolin. While Cally treated Vila's jokes as playful remarks from a friend, both Dayna and Soolin considered him to be quite lecherous. The rest of the crew are aware of this; during the episode "Headhunter", Vila remarks that he was a "...perfect gentleman" to Muller's wife, to which Tarrant replies: "That's what bothered us." However, Vila is capable of genuine affection and concern for his female friends; despite his lecherous comments and flirtations with her at the outset, his relationship with Kerril developed quickly into love, with Vila offering to sacrifice himself so that Kerril would escape. Similarly, during the episode "Sand" he was shown to be very upset with Soolin when she mentions Cally's death.

Following a final, uncommon act of heroism, Vila is gunned down during the final shoot-out on Gauda Prime along with rest of the Scorpio crew, and is presumed to have died.

The character was twice considered for removal from the series, according to the DVD commentaries of script editor Chris Boucher and producer David Maloney. Terry Nation originally wanted Vila to be killed in Pressure Point, but was overruled by the other producers. Later, it was briefly suggested that Vila be killed off in "Star One", along with Jenna; he remained because a survey showed him to be the series' second-most popular character.

In an interview with Tony Attwood, Keating said that he was watching the series with his daughter when she said, "Daddy, you're stupid!" Keating related this to Boucher, inspiring the latter to write "City at the Edge of the World" in which Vila becomes a hero.

In the B7 audio series, Vila is played by Dean Harris; however, Michael Keating returned to the role for the story When Vila Met Gan. Keating reprised the role in several volumes of the Liberator Chronicles (a series of enhanced audiobooks released by Big Finish in a licence deal with B7 Enterprises) and the Classic Audio Adventures series produced by the same company, released from January 2014.

== Servalan ==
Servalan
- Blake's 7 character
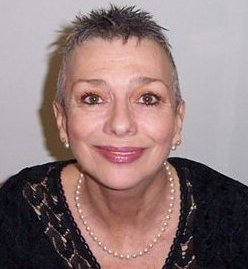
- First appearance: Seek-Locate-Destroy
- Last appearance: Warlord
- Portrayed by: Jacqueline Pearce

In-universe information
- Species: Human
- Gender: Female
- Affiliation: Terran Federation

Servalan was played by Jacqueline Pearce (in the B7 audio series, she is played by Daniela Nardini). She was the principal villain of the series. Series creator Terry Nation originally intended her to make only a single appearance but she went on to appear in all four series, the only guest character to do so. Initially a high-ranking commander in the Federation, she later organises a military coup and becomes President (in the series two finale "Star One"), before later being deposed herself and presumed dead, but actually returning under an alias, Commissioner Sleer. She is principally concerned with organising efforts to destroy Blake and his group, obtaining the Liberator and Orac, and crushing any and all resistance to the Federation's rule. She is quickly revealed to be a cold, calculating, ruthless sociopath who is not above using her sex appeal and charm to get what she wants. Tanith Lee, a scriptwriter on Blake's 7, said that Pearce's troubled life – including her struggles with depression – fed into the character's development. "It is, to some extent, based on her own life," Lee said. "Given an actor of her power inhabiting the psychotic Servalan, how could I resist aiming for maximum emotional anguish?"

Servalan's final appearance in the series was in the penultimate episode ("Warlord"), in which she successfully arranged for the Scorpio crew's secret base to be destroyed. She does not appear in "Blake", and is therefore presumed to be alive by the series' end.

In Tony Attwood's early sequel novel Afterlife, she is shot and killed by Korell, a woman serving as crew-mate to Avon and Vila (who also formerly jailed the former), who has her own dictatorial ambitions. In Lucifer by Paul Darrow, a sequel set in a different continuity and set twenty years after "Blake", Servalan also appears.

Servalan/Sleer appeared in the BBC's official audio adventures, The Sevenfold Crown and The Syndeton Experiment. She also returned in the unofficial audio adventure The Logic of Empire and in subsequent Big Finish audio adventures.

== Slave ==
Slave is the flight computer on the Scorpio. It is featured throughout the fourth season voiced by Peter Tuddenham. It was originally programmed to respond only to Dorian's voice print, but Orac was later able to remove this so the computer responded to anyone who addressed it. The crew made general use of Slave's abilities throughout their time aboard the ship.

Slave was a unique system installed by Dorian, possibly making use of work by Ensor. It could communicate verbally with the crew and handle routine flight procedures at a level of sophistication unmatched by any human-built computer with the exception of Orac. Due to Dorian's rather strange sense of humour, Slave was programmed with an exaggeratedly obsequious and subservient personality, habitually addressing the crew as "Master" or "Mistress".

Slave was quite capable of directing the Scorpio from planet to planet without human assistance, and it was in fact impossible to land the ship in its hangar on Xenon with the computer off-line. Emergency operations were also not beyond Slave's abilities to handle.

During and after the crash of Scorpio on Gauda Prime, Slave was severely damaged. Running on emergency power cells, Slave broke his obedience and called Tarrant by his name instead of calling him Master/Sir.

Slave is later played by Peter Tuddenham in The Sevenfold Crown and The Syndeton Experiment for BBC Radio plays.

== Soolin ==
Soolin
- Blake's 7 character
- First appearance: Rescue
- Last appearance: Blake
- Portrayed by: Glynis Barber (TV series); Paula Wilcox (BBC Radio)

In-universe information
- Species: Human
- Gender: Female
- Affiliation: Resistance

Soolin was played by Glynis Barber, who had appeared as a Federation mutoid in Season One's "Project Avalon". .

Soolin met the survivors of the Liberator on their return from Terminal at the beginning of Season Four. Dorian's companion and lover, she was a skilled gunfighter. She had learnt her trade at a young age after her parents were murdered by hired mercenaries on Gauda Prime. Learning how to be proficient with a gun, she tracked down the killers and avenged her parents' deaths.

After Dorian's death, she initially disappeared and hid somewhere in Xenon base and then later reappeared offering to join the group. Prone to sarcasm and highly suspicious, she was nevertheless loyal to the Scorpio crew and would occasionally hint at greater depth in her character. She also displayed keen intelligence, figuring out the identity of Cancer in "Assassin", for example. Soolin was seen shot down by Federation guards in the series finale.

Glynis Barber stated in a 2006 interview that she would not have returned for a fifth series of the TV series had one been made.

Soolin also appeared in the BBC Radio plays The Sevenfold Crown and The Syndeton Experiment, and was portrayed by Paula Wilcox.

== Jenna Stannis ==
Jenna Stannis
- Blake's 7 character
- First appearance: The Way Back
- Last appearance: Star One (regular) Jenna's Story (death)
- Portrayed by: Sally Knyvette

In-universe information
- Species: Human
- Gender: Female
- Affiliation: Resistance

Jenna Stannis is played by Sally Knyvette. (The role was revived in the Blake's 7 audio plays, where at first she was played by Carrie Dobro, though Knyvette has since returned to playing her again in Big Finish Productions audio stories.)

A member of the elite Alpha class, Jenna was a beautiful but cynical smuggler/self-styled "free trader". She was captured by the Federation and sentenced to be transported to the prison colony on Cygnus Alpha. However, she befriends Blake, assists in a mutiny on the transport ship and escapes with him and Avon aboard the Liberator.

A talented pilot, Jenna initially takes charge of all navigation duties aboard the Liberator. She is the only crew member capable of piloting the ship when Zen is inoperative or unwilling to do so.

Jenna is cynical and untrusting, but can also be kind and affectionate with a good sense of humour. She is very intelligent, in keeping with her grade rating, and seemed to enjoy baiting Avon and Vila. While Jenna is never completely devoted to Blake's ideals, she is loyal to him and they had a strong mutual affection (she was chosen by Sinofar in "Duel" to demonstrate the death of a friend to Blake and was jealous of Inga in "Hostage"). She is also more ethical than the other crew. When she was a free trader, for example, she refused to run drugs. Her beauty brought her to the attention of a number of dangerous people ("Space Fall"), but she used her looks to her advantage on occasion ("The Keeper").

Jenna disappears with Blake during the Intergalactic War at the end of the second series. The only report Zen discovers is that she was on a hospital ship. In the series finale, Blake told Tarrant that Jenna returned to smuggling and died by self-destructing her ship and taking "half a squadron of gunships" with her.

"Jenna's Story" by Steve Lyons (The Liberator Chronicles, Volume 6, performed by Sally Knyvette) details the events from Jenna's escape from the Liberator during the Galactic War, and her determination to continue Blake's fight against the Federation until the moment of her death. Jenna is killed when the ship she was piloting was destroyed.

== Del Tarrant ==
Del Tarrant
- Blake's 7 character
- First appearance: Aftermath
- Last appearance: Blake
- Portrayed by: Steven Pacey

In-universe information
- Species: Human
- Gender: Male
- Affiliation: Resistance

Del Tarrant was played by Steven Pacey.

Tarrant is a skilled pilot, trained at the Federation Space Academy, who steals a pursuit ship and begins running contraband in the outer planets and getting involved in wars. He rises high on the Federation's "wanted list". During the Intergalactic War, he goes in against the Andromedans and his ship is destroyed in the first salvo. He is picked up by a Federation ship and acquires a uniform. When that ship is destroyed, he is picked up by the damaged Liberator and presumed by the Federation officers aboard to be in charge. He cooperates with Avon to kill the Federation officers and take back the ship, after which he becomes a member of the crew, replacing Jenna Stannis as their principal pilot.

Tarrant is intelligent, cunning and worldly, but can also be arrogant and impulsive. He is also heroic and idealistic, however; when the Liberator is being pulled into a black hole, he stops Avon from abandoning the ship on the idea that "we all go together." Avon says of him, "Tarrant is brave, young, handsome – there are three good reasons for anyone not to like him."

He and Avon have frequent clashes over who is in charge of the ship. While his idealism is central to this conflict, it also affords Avon some tactical advantages. He sometimes uses Tarrant's headstrong approach to distract the enemy while he finds a more devious solution. Despite their conflicts, Tarrant goes out of his way on a number of occasions to save Avon's life. He tends to bully Vila Restal, for which Avon castigates him in "City at the Edge of the World".

Tarrant's brother, Deeta, is killed by an android in the Teal-Vandor Convention. Tarrant avenges his death to prevent a war, although he cannot bring himself to shoot the android in the back. Tarrant has brief romantic involvements with Servalan and Zeeona. It is also implied during the episode "Ultraworld" that Dayna and Tarrant have sex, so that the human reproductive process can be studied by the planet's inhabitants (at one point, prior to their first kiss, Dayna is shown leaning over a prone Tarrant and remarking "I can't be all that repulsive").

Tarrant is injured in the crash of the Scorpio when he stays at the controls so that the others can escape. He is later gunned down during the final shoot-out on Gauda Prime.

In Paul Darrow's novel Lucifer, Tarrant's body, along with the bodies of the rest of the Scorpio crew, were removed by Federation troopers in order to destroy all evidence of the shootout on Gauda Prime.

However, in Tony Attwood's Afterlife, Tarrant passes out from his wounds and is later killed by wild animals on Terminal.

The series' first episode "The Way Back", features a Federation security agent named Dev Tarrant who arranges the massacre of Blake's friends and the murder of his lawyers. No connection is made between him and Steven Pacey's character.

== Travis ==
Travis
- Blake's 7 character
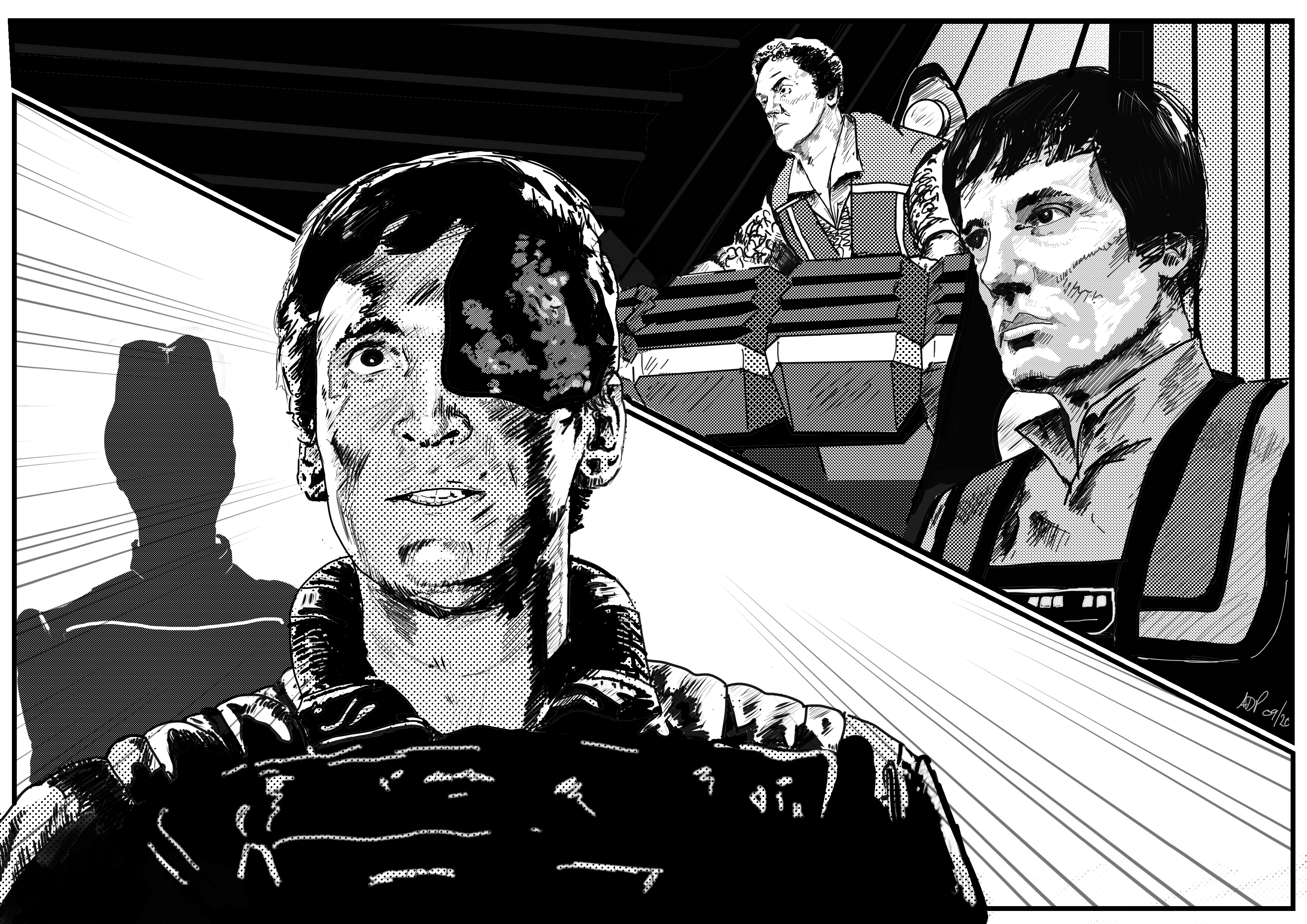
- Drawing of Greif as Travis (main), Avon to right and Gan to rear
- First appearance: Seek-Locate-Destroy
- Last appearance: Star One
- Created by: Terry Nation
- Portrayed by: Stephen Greif (Series 1); Brian Croucher (Series 2)
- Voiced by: Craig Kelly

In-universe information
- Species: Human
- Gender: Male
- Occupation: Space Commander
- Affiliation: Terran Federation; Servalan; rogue

Space Commander Travis was played by Stephen Greif in the first series, but he was unable to return for the second series. "Weapon", the third episode of the second series, marked the first performance of Brian Croucher in the role, whom Greif had nominated to replace him. In this episode, Travis expresses to Supreme Commander Servalan some unease about his recent "rehabilitation". In B7 Productions' audio dramas of Blake's 7, Craig Kelly assumes the role of Travis.

Travis is a Space Commander in the Terran Federation who is infamous for his brutality and ruthlessness. Four years prior to the events of the series, a Federation leader commissions him to subdue an anti-Federation resistance movement on Earth. Travis and a band of troopers under his command ambush a key resistance group. When the group's leader, Roj Blake, declares their surrender, Travis commands his men to gun down the rebels. Blake wrests a DEW gun from a trooper, and shoots Travis, wounding him severely on the left side of his body. After the troopers capture Blake, a combat medic called Maryatt partially repairs Travis's face. Later, Travis eschews cosmetic surgery, and replaces his amputated left arm with a cybernetic one equipped with an energy weapon called a Laseron Destroyer. He explains his refusal of cosmetic surgery to Servalan as being a field officer, not a staff officer

When Blake escapes the Federation, Servalan, then Supreme Commander of the Terran Federation, enlists Travis as a special agent to hunt Blake—and to commandeer Liberator, an advanced starship which Blake now captains. In his several encounters with Blake, Travis eventually captures a resistance leader called Avalon, and indirectly causes the death of one of Blake's crewmen, Olag Gan. Ultimately, however, Travis fails too egregiously for Servalan, who required of him not only the downfall of the resistance movement, but calculated assistance in her manoeuvring for total galactic ascendancy. Servalan fears that Travis's blundering might expose her abuses of power, and concludes that his liability exceeds his faltering usefulness. Finally, she endorses a dilatory court-martial for a massacre which Travis ordered earlier in his career—a crime for which he was sure to be executed, as well as being dishonourably discharged and stripped of rank.

Coincidentally, the Liberator, under Blake's command, attacks the Federation headquarters where the trial is taking place, at the penultimate moment of Travis's sentencing. Amidst the commotion of the attack, Travis seizes the opportunity to escape his death sentence, and absconds to Servalan's office. Servalan provides him with federation crewed only by mutoids and he leaves. Travis is now free to resume his hunt for Blake.

Blake and Travis meet for the final time at Star One, a secret base and supercomputer of crucial importance to the Federation's control of its planets. There, Blake discovers that Travis has betrayed the Federation to aliens from the Andromeda Galaxy. Travis shoots Blake on sight, but is unaware that he has not mortally wounded him. When an opportune moment arises, Blake clips Travis with a shot from his sidearm. Before Travis can retaliate, Avon shoots Travis and he falls into an energy vortex, killing him.

Status
| Preceded by Paul Darrow | Oldest living cast member Played by Brian Croucher; June 3, 2019 – present | Incumbent |

== Zen ==
Zen
- Blake's 7 character
- First appearance: Cygnus Alpha
- Last appearance: Terminal
- Portrayed by: Peter Tuddenham; Alistair Lock

In-universe information
- Species: Computer
- Affiliation: The System/Resistance

Zen is the master computer aboard the Liberator, formerly Deep Space Vehicle 2, the highly advanced spacecraft used by Blake and the others initially to escape from and then attack the Federation. The voice of Zen is provided by Peter Tuddenham (in the B7 audio series and Big Finish Productions audio series, Zen is voiced by Alistair Lock).

Zen's history, like that of the Liberator itself, is unknown prior to its first appearance. It specifically refused to answer questions about the previous crew of the Liberator. It was constructed by "The System" ("Redemption"), which also installed a series of over-rides to take external control of the ship if necessary.

Zen's visual interface is a large brown hexagonal dome toward the front of the bridge with lights that flashed as it spoke; it is suggested in "Cygnus Alpha" that this 'visual reference point' was created by Zen to aid the crew after they asked it to show itself. Zen would simply make computer noises in place of speaking when overridden by The System.

Zen is capable of piloting the Liberator on its own, with the notable exception of being unable to operate the teleport controls. It has banks of auxiliary computers that can be brought on-line when requested. These included navigation computers, which can pilot the Liberator to any known destination, and battle computers, that can formulate strategy, pilot the ship and operate the weapon systems during combat, even successfully fighting off a number of Federation pursuit ships without crew input ("Volcano"). Zen can also force the auto-repair systems to prioritise certain systems.

Zen has a chamber underneath its main dome that can perform instantaneous analysis of substances, such as the virus in "Project Avalon" or the drug in "Shadow". It also has access to more sophisticated analysis equipment, as demonstrated in its frantic attempts to find a solution to the corrosive space particles in "Terminal". Zen also has telepathic ability. It operates a defence system against intruders that uses images of loved ones to draw them to their deaths. It can also form a temporary telepathic link with new crew – taking the name "Liberator" from Jenna's mind, for example.

Although open to instruction, Zen projects a dour, non-committal personality all of its own. In some of the early episodes, Zen would reply to certain questions with the phrase "That information is not available" and it was left open as to whether Zen was secretly executing its own agenda or genuinely couldn't help. In the episodes "Time Squad" and "Breakdown", Zen refuses to help the crew carry out actions it believed endangered the ship, and even though it could not control the teleport, it disables the system by causing a circuit burnout.

Zen's massive database was a paradox within itself. The Federation was totally unaware of Liberator's origins (The System), yet Zen is able to provide information on Federation Planets, colonies, space ship designs and history, but it is unable, or unwilling to recognise the two Drones from The System in "Redemption", despite their architecture being of its own kind.

After the crew abandon the Liberator temporarily when it is damaged in the Intergalactic War, Zen is ordered to take commands only from the voice prints of certain members of the crew. The psychic defence barrier seen in Space Fall, was deactivated when Avon commanded Zen to allow an unrecognised ship to dock, which most likely contained Klegg and his troops. When Tarrant and Dayna joined the crew, their voice prints were added. Servalan's voice print was also added when she managed to take over the Liberator temporarily in "Harvest of Kairos", but is removed when the crew reassert control.

Zen and the Liberator are destroyed in "Terminal" (aired March 31, 1980). In the episode, Zen reveals itself to have been more self-aware and human than previously thought.

The B7 Media audio remake of Blake's 7 featured different versions of the Liberator and Zen, as related in The Early Years: Escape Velocity, which presents an origin story.
