= Steven Pacey =

English actor (born 1957)

- Born: 5 June 1957; Royal Leamington Spa, Warwickshire, England
- Occupation: Actor
- Known for: Blake's 7
- Website: https://stevenpacey.com

Steven Pacey (born 5 June 1957) is an English actor. He is best known for his role as Del Tarrant in the third and fourth series of the science fiction series Blake's 7 from January 1980 to December 1981, and as a leading man in several West End shows.

== Personal life ==
Pacey was born on 5 June 1957 in Royal Leamington Spa, Warwickshire. . He married Joan Marine with whom he has twin daughters. He has an older brother, Peter Pacey, who is also an actor.

== Career ==
=== Television and film ===
Pacey had a regular role as Del Tarrant in Blake's 7 appearing in every episode of the third and fourth seasons of the science fiction series; he also played the role of Del's twin brother Deeta Tarrant in one episode. Other notable television appearances include the forthcoming TV adaption of You Are Here, and Netflix’s The Age of Innocence. Other TV includes MobLand, Finder’s Keepers, The Flatshare, The Diplomat,House of the Dragon, Love Death and Robots, Secret Level: The Once and Future King, The Alienist, Privates, Humans, Wallander, Silent Witness, Jeffrey Archer: The Truth, Foyle’s War, Taggart, The Cedar Tree, Heartbeat, Lovejoy, M.I.T.: Murder Investigation Team, Murder in Mind, Pie in the Sky, Spooks. His film credits include Hope Gap, Benediction, Return to House on Haunted Hill, Boy A, Passover, Aces High, Julius Caesar.

=== Theatre ===
Pacey was nominated for an Olivier Award for the role of Bertie Wooster in the musical By Jeeves. Other West End stage appearances include Much Ado About Nothing and Love’s Labours Lost (RSC), The Knowledge, Relative Values, Spamalot, The Old Masters, La Cage Aux Folles, The Constant Wife, Someone Else’s Shoes, Dolly West's Kitchen, The Room, Celebration, Democracy, The Birthday Party, Things We Do for Love, The Phantom of the Opera, The Admirable Crichton, Exclusive, High Society, West Side Story, Mr. Cinders, Godspell, and Leave Him to Heaven. Other theatre includes Volpone and Jew of Malta for the RSC and King Lear (Chichester/New York).

=== Radio and audio books ===
Radio work includes more than 350 broadcasts. Pacey has narrated more than 250 audiobooks, including works by Joe Abercrombie, James Herbert, Joanne Harris and Martin Amis.
