= List of performances by Josette Simon =

Josette Simon is an English actor of Antiguan descent. Her first theatrical role was as a chorus member in the Leicester Haymarket Theatre production of Joseph and the Amazing Technicolor Dreamcoat, which was followed by several minor roles in other productions at the same venue. She went on to study at the Central School of Speech and Drama.

Her first television role was as Dayna Mellanby in the third and fourth series of the television sci-fi series Blake's 7 from 1980 to 1981. She joined the Royal Shakespeare Company in 1982 for a two-year cycle, and had four minor roles in Shakespeare plays in her first year: as a witch, a spirit and twice as a servant, which was typical for new members of the company. In 1984 she was taken on for another two-year cycle, and starred as Dorcas Ableman in Golden Girls, directed by Barry Kyle, which became a breakthrough role for her. Later that year she landed her first leading role at the RSC, the first for a black actress, when she was cast by Kyle as Rosaline in Love's Labour's Lost. In 1985 she directed Heavenly Body by Didier Van Couvelaert for two performances at the Gulbenkian Studio and one night at the Almeida Theatre. In 1987, Simon appeared for the RSC again, in the lead role of Isabella in Measure for Measure. Later leading roles for the RSC saw her as Titania/Hippolyta in A Midsummer Night's Dream (1999–2000) and, after a seventeen year interval, Cleopatra in Antony and Cleopatra (2017–18).

On radio, Simon played the title character in the 1985 BBC Radio 3 production of Mirandolina. She was the lead in David Zane Mairowitz's play Dictator Gal, broadcast on the same station in 1992. Her film appearances include the part of Dr. Ramphele in Cry Freedom (1987), and the lead role of Joanna in Milk and Honey (1988). She also starred in the 1992 television play Bitter Harvest and alongside Brenda Fricker in the two-part television series Seekers, written by Lynda La Plante in 1993. More recently, she had a recurring role as a defence lawyer in Anatomy of a Scandal (2022).

She won the Evening Standard's Best Actress award, a Critics' Circle Theatre Award, and Plays and Players Critic Awards for Arthur Miller's After the Fall, in which she played Maggie, thought to have been based on Marilyn Monroe. Simon was nominated as Best Actress at the 1989 Genie Awards for her part in the film Milk and Honey (1988), and won the Best Actress award at both the Atlantic Film Festival and Creteil International Women's Film Festival for the role. She gained a Prix Futura Award nomination for the radio play Dictator Gal (1993). Simon was awarded the Order of the British Empire in 2000, for services to drama.

== Television and streaming ==
Television and streaming appearances by Josette Simon
Year	Title	Role	Notes	Ref.
1980–1981	Blake's 7	Dayna Mellanby	BBC1, series 3 and 4, 26 episodes	
1980	The Cuckoo Waltz	Bonnie	ITV	
1980	The Squad	Noble Bartlett	ITV, episode: "Decoy"	
1984	Play for Today	Linda King	BBC1, episode: "King"	
1986	Pob's Programme	guest	Channel 4	
1986	Harem	Geisla	ABC TV movie, two parts	
1986	Save a Life: A is for Airway	cast member	BBC1	
1986	Umbrella	guest	BBC1	
1986	The Pyrates	Sheba	BBC2	
1987	The Trumpet of a Prophecy	participant	Channel 4	
1988	World in Action	Theresa Ramashamola	ITV, episode "The trial of Theresa"	
1988	Thompson	cast member	BBC1, two episodes	
1989	Here is the News	Catherine Jones	BBC2, part of Screen Two	
1989	Somewhere to Run	Christine	ITV	
1989	Child Slaves	narrator	BBC2	
1989	Capital City	Beatrice	ITV	
1990	TECX	Charlotte	ITV, episode: "Writing on the Wall"	
1990	When Love Dies	Annabel	Channel 4, part of 4 Play	
1992	A Child from the South	Nadia Sagov	Channel 4 TV movie	
1992	Bitter Harvest	Vivienne Johnson	BBC2	
1992	Nice Town	Frankie Thompson	BBC2, three episodes	
1993	Seekers	Susie	ITV, both episodes	
1994	Firebird	narrator	BBC2, part of The Natural World	
1994	Shooting Stars	narrator	Channel 4, part of Black Christmas	
1995	Henry IV	Kate	BBC2, part of Performance	
1996	Bodyguards	Javrunda Hamad	ITV	
1997	Bridge of Time	Fatima	ABC TV movie.	
1997	Kavanagh QC	Dr. Hilary Jameson	ITV, episode: "Blood Money"	
1998	Dalziel and Pascoe	Eileen Anstiss	BBC One, episode: "Bones and Silence"	
1998, 2011, 2024	Silent Witness	DCI Jo Hoskins	BBC One, episodes: "Divided Loyalties", parts 1 and 2 (1998)	
1998, 2011, 2024	Silent Witness	Mrs Ferris	BBC One, episode: "First Casualty", part 2 (2011)	
1998, 2011, 2024	Silent Witness	DCI Ford	BBC One, episode: "Effective Range", Part 2 (2024)	
1999	Polterguests	Dilys Tring	ITV	
1999	Untold: Brown Babies	narrator	Channel 4	
2000	Reputations: Joe Louis: the Boxer Who Beat Hitler	narrator	BBC Two	
2002	Celeb	Dawn	BBC One, episode: "The Guest"	
2003	The Last Detective	Jemma Duvall	ITV, episode: "Lofty"	
2005	The Extraordinary Equiano	narrator	BBC Four	
2006	Poirot	Mirelle Milesi	Episode: "The Mystery of the Blue Train"	
2006, 2025	Midsomer Murders	Samantha Flint	ITV, episode: "Last Year's Model" (2006)	
2006, 2025	Midsomer Murders	Madeline Saunders	Acorn TV, episode "Claws Out" (2025)	
2006, 2009–2010	Casualty	Sarah Keith	BBC One, episodes: "The Sunny Side of the Street", parts 1 and 2 (2006)	
2006, 2009–2010	Casualty	Frances Liveley	BBC One, series 23, three episodes (2009)	
2006, 2009–2010	Casualty	Frances Liveley	BBC One, series 24, four episodes (2010)	
2007	Lewis	Stephanie Fielding	ITV, episode: "Expiation"	
2007	The Whistleblowers	Linda Hillcott	ITV	
2008	The Bill	Rachel Cartwright	ITV	
2008	Skins	Elaine	E4, episode "Jal"	
2009	Minder	DI Murray	Channel 5, three episodes	
2009	Who Do You Want Your Child to Be?	narrator	BBC Two, part of Horizon	
2010	The Silence	Therapist	BBC One, two episodes	
2011	Spooks	Julia Dennison	BBC One, series 10, episode 1	
2012	Law & Order: UK	Paulette Clarkson	ITV, episode: "Survivor's Guilt"	
2012	New Tricks	Vera	BBC One, episode: "Queen and Country"	
2012	Merlin	Euchdag / The Diamair	BBC One, episodes: "Arthur's Bane", parts 1 and 2	
2014	Death in Paradise	Judge Anne Stone	BBC One, episode: "An Artistic Murder"	
2014	Suspects	Dr. Melanie Standish	Channel 5	
2016	NW	Theodora Lewis Lane	BBC Two	
2016	A Midsummer Night's Dream	Titania	CBeebies	
2017	Broadchurch	Chief Superintendent Clark	ITV, series 3, three episodes	
2018	The Split	Maya	BBC One, episode 6	
2018	Jägarna	Ayanda Moganedi	TV4/C More	
2018	Zapped	Kerreth	Dave, series 3, episode 6	
2019	Nightflyers	Cynthia	Syfy	
2019	Queens of Mystery	Tallulah Savage-Hughes	Acorn TV, two episodes, "Death by Vinyl", parts 1 and 2	
2019	Cleopatra and Me: In Search of a Lost Queen	participant/performer	BBC Four	
2019	The Tool	Ms Michaels	Channel 4 Online, part of Comedy Blaps	
2020	Riviera	Cynthia Akuffo	Sky Atlantic, series 3, episodes 7 and 8	
2020	The Witcher	Eithne	Netflix	
2020	Absentia	Rowena Kincade	Amazon Prime Video	
2020	Shakespeare & Hathaway: Private Investigators	Henrietta Bolingbroke	BBC One, episode "How The Rogue Roar'd"	
2020	Small Axe	Lydia Thomas	BBC One, episode Education	
2021	The Mallorca Files	Anna Hammond	BBC One, episode: "The Maestro"	
2022	Anatomy of a Scandal	Angela Regan	Netflix, six episodes	
2022	The Girlfriend Experience	Lindsey	Starz	
2022	Halo	Desiderata	Paramount+, episode "Inheritance"	
2022	Crossfire	Miriam	BBC One	
2023	Sanditon	Elizabeth Greenhorn	ITVX, series 3, episode 2	
2025	The Forsytes	Ellen Parker Barrington	PBS Masterpiece	
TBA	Meantime		Sky	
TBA	Anansi Boys	Chief Commissioner Camberwell	Amazon Prime Video	

== Film ==
Film appearances by Josette Simon
Year	Title	Role	Ref.
1987	Cry Freedom	Dr. Ramphele	
1988	Milk and Honey	Joanna Bell	
2008	The Beloved Ones (short)	Maureen	
2010	The Nine Muses	voices	
2012	Red Lights	Corinne	
2017	Wonder Woman	Mnemosyne	
2018	Sasha and Joe are getting married (short)	Claire	
2019	Detective Pikachu	Grams	
2020	The Witches	Zelda	
2023	Rea's Men (short)	Rea	
2024	Tell That to the Winter Sea	Kat	
2024	The Crow	Sophia	
2025	Bridget Jones: Mad About the Boy	Talitha	

== Theatre ==
Stage appearances by Josette Simon
Year	Title	Role	Company/Theatre	Director	Ref. (Note: For Shakespeare Birthplace Trust references, click on the play title on the linked page for fuller details.)
1974	Joseph and the Amazing Technicolor Dreamcoat	chorus	Leicester Haymarket Theatre and tour	Robin Midgley	
1974	Dick Whittington	unknown	Leicester Haymarket Theatre	Anthony Cornish	
1976	The Miracle Worker	Martha	Leicester Haymarket Theatre	Michael Bogdanov	
1979	The Man of Mode	cast member	Central School of Speech and Drama	Peter Streuli	
1982	Salvation Now (play reading)	Estelle Namier	Royal Shakespeare Company	Dusty Hughes	
1982, 1983	Macbeth	Weird Sister	Royal Shakespeare Company	Howard Davies	
1982, 1983	Much Ado About Nothing	Josetta/Servant to Hero	Royal Shakespeare Company	Terry Hands	
1982, 1983	Peer Gynt	Herd Girl/Anitra/Wedding Guest	Royal Shakespeare Company	Ron Daniels	
1982, 1983	The Tempest	Spirit	Royal Shakespeare Company	Ron Daniels	
1982, 1983	Antony and Cleopatra	Iras	Royal Shakespeare Company	Adrian Noble	
1982, 1983, 1985	Bond Songs	singer/musician	Royal Shakespeare Company	unknown	
1983	Much Ado About Nothing	Margaret	Royal Shakespeare Company	Terry Hands	
1983	The Custom of the Country	Tendai	Royal Shakespeare Company	David Jones	
1984, 1985	The Merchant Of Venice	Nerissa	Royal Shakespeare Company	John Caird	
1984, 1985	Golden Girls	Dorcas Ableman	Royal Shakespeare Company	Barry Kyle	
1984, 1985	The Party	Lindie Mann	Royal Shakespeare Company	Howard Davies	
1984, 1985	Love's Labour's Lost	Rosaline	Royal Shakespeare Company	Barry Kyle	
1984	The Mystery of the Charity of Joan of Arc	Joan	Royal Shakespeare Company	AJ Quinn	
1985	Heavenly Body	unknown cast member / Maxine (in the August performance)	Royal Shakespeare Company	Josette Simon	
1985	The Shepherd	performer	Royal Shakespeare Company	unknown	
1985	After the Assassinations	performer	Royal Shakespeare Company	the company (Note: The programme has the credit "directed by the company")	
1985	The Tin Can People	Woman 2	Royal Shakespeare Company	Nick Hamm	
1985	Great Peace	Daughter	Royal Shakespeare Company	Nick Hamm	
1985	Red Black and Ignorant	Girl in playground/Lover	Royal Shakespeare Company	Nick Hamm	
1985	Some Kind of Love Story	Angela	Royal Shakespeare Company	Nick Hamm	
1985	Just Once More	performer	Royal Shakespeare Company	unknown	
1987, 1988	Measure For Measure	Isabella	Royal Shakespeare Company	Nicholas Hytner	
1990	After the Fall	Maggie	Royal National Theatre	Michael Blakemore	
1991	The White Devil	Vittoria	Royal National Theatre	Philip Prowse	
1994	The Lady from the Sea	Ellida Wangel	West Yorkshire Playhouse, Lyric Hammersmith	Lindsay Posner	
1995	The Taming of the Shrew	Katherina	Leicester Haymarket Theatre	Mihai Măniuțiu	
1997	The Maids	Our Lady	Donmar Warehouse	John Crowley	
1999, 2000	A Midsummer Night's Dream	Titania/Hippolyta	Royal Shakespeare Company	Michael Boyd	
1999, 2000	Don Carlos	Elizabeth of Valois	Royal Shakespeare Company	Gale Edwards	
2001	The Vagina Monologues	performer	New Ambassadors	Eve Ensler	
2017, 2018	Antony and Cleopatra	Cleopatra	Royal Shakespeare Company	Iqbal Khan	

== Radio ==
Radio appearances by Josette Simon
Year	Title	Role	Notes	Ref.
1980	Cromwell Mansions	cast member	Piccadilly Radio	
1984	Meridian	guest	BBC World Service	
1985, 1992, 1994	Woman's Hour	guest	BBC Radio 4	
1985	Mirandolina	Mirandolina	BBC Radio 3	
1992	Dictator Gal	the Gal	BBC Radio 3	
1992	Work Talk	guest	BBC Radio 4	
1994	Listen to Me	voice	BBC Radio 3, part of Towards the Millennium	
1995	Sealed with a Kiss	Ellen	BBC Radio 4	
1996	The Roads to Freedom	Ivich	BBC Radio 4	
1996	Picasso's Women	Marie-Thérèse	BBC Radio 3	
1996, 2006	Poetry Please!	reader	BBC Radio 4, including two episodes in 2006	
1997	Agonies Awakening	Athena	BBC Radio 3, part of The Sunday Play	
1998	Twelfth Night	Olivia	BBC Radio 3, part of The Sunday Play. Also released as an audiobook.	
2001	The Josephine Baker Story (by Ean Wood)	reader	BBC Radio 4, part of Book of the Week, five episodes	
2002	Voices in the Room	Misha	BBC Radio 4, part of Afternoon Play	
2002	Letters to an Icon	Dark Lady/lnvisiblewoman	BBC Radio 4, part of Afternoon Play	
2006	And Still I Rise (by Doreen Lawrence)	reader	BBC Radio 4, part of Book of the Week, five episodes	
2006	The Verb	actor	BBC Radio 3, in Nick Silver Can't Sleep by Janice Kerbel.	
2007, 2008, 2011, 2016, 2019, 2021	Words and Music	reader	BBC Radio 3, episode "Slavery and Freedom" (2007)	
2007, 2008, 2011, 2016, 2019, 2021	Words and Music	reader	BBC Radio 3, episode "Birth and Rebirth" (2008)	
2007, 2008, 2011, 2016, 2019, 2021	Words and Music	reader	BBC Radio 3, episode "Law and Order" (2011)	
2007, 2008, 2011, 2016, 2019, 2021	Words and Music	reader	BBC Radio 3, episode "Pilgrimage" (2016)	
2007, 2008, 2011, 2016, 2019, 2021	Words and Music	presenter	BBC Radio 3, episode "Windrush: Some Kind of Homecoming" (2019)	
2007, 2008, 2011, 2016, 2019, 2021	Words and Music	reader	BBC Radio 3, episode "The Tudors" (2021)	
2012	The Stephen Lawrence Case	reader	BBC Radio 4, part of The Long View	
2012	Alexandre Dumas – The Count of Monte Cristo	Mercedes de Morcerf	BBC Radio 4, three episodes	
2016	Women Talking About Cars	narrator	BBC Radio 4, four episodes	
2017, 2018	Saturday Live	guest	BBC Radio 4	
2017, 2018	Saturday Live	Inheritance Tracks guest	BBC Radio 4	
2018	Choir and Organ	guest	BBC Radio 3	
2020	Whatever Happened to Baby Jane Austen?	Mrs Ragnarrok	BBC Radio 4	
2022	Gossip and Goddesses with Granny Kumar	guest	BBC Radio 4	
2022	Steve Wright in the Afternoon	guest	BBC Radio 2	
2023	Radio 4 Appeal: Pets as Therapy	self	BBC Radio 4	
2024	Limelight	Patricia	BBC Radio 4, five episodes	

== Other ==
Other appearances by Josette Simon
Year	Title	Role	Notes	Ref.
1985	The Manager and the Law: Liability: You and the Customer	cast	Training film by Video Arts	
1991	Think or Sink	cast	Training film by Video Arts	
1995	Strategy	cast	Commissioned by PriceWaterhouseCoopers	
1995	The Old Testament	reader	audiobook	
2002	Elizabeth II and the Commonwealth	narrator	Commissioned by Foreign and Commonwealth Office	
2016	Doctor Who: Classic Doctors, New Monsters	Sarana Teel	Audio drama by Big Finish Productions, episode "The Sontaran Ordeal"	
2017	Antony and Cleopatra	Cleopatra	RSC Live from Stratford Upon Avon; relayed to cinemas, and later released on video	
2018	Doctor Who: The Fourth Doctor Adventures	Taraneh	Audio drama by Big Finish Productions, episode "The Mind Runners"	
2018	Antony and Cleopatra: Music & Speeches	Cleopatra	CD featuring extracts from Antony and Cleopatra (2017)	
