= Alphonsia Emmanuel =

British actress (b. 1956)

Alphonsia Emmanuel (born 7 November 1956) is a British actress known for her appearances in House of Cards, Under Suspicion (1991), Peter's Friends (1992) and Still Crazy (1998), among other films. She was a member of the Royal Shakespeare Company and the Royal National Theatre.

== Early life ==
Emmanuel was born Alphonsia Pamela Williams in Pointe Michel, Dominica in the British West Indies in 1956. When she was an infant, her parents, Lewis and Portia Williams, relocated to the United Kingdom in search of work while Emmanuel stayed in Dominica with her grandparents until she joined her parents in London, aged two. She attended Carlton Vale School and Claremont High School, where she achieved A levels in Law and English. At this time, Emmanuel developed her interest in performing, attending dance classes and acting in school productions. Emmanuel considered a theatrical career, but was put off by the advice of a career guidance counsellor "to whom I confessed my secret for the first time. She smiled indulgently and said that acting was not for people like us."

Emmanuel attended Kingston University from 1977 to 1980, where she received a Bachelor of Education degree, having majored in English and Drama. After graduation, she worked as a teacher from 1980 to 1981, yet she longed for a career in the theatre. Emmanuel trained at the Webber Douglas Academy of Dramatic Art in London, where she earned a postgraduate qualification in theatre techniques in 1983. Embarking on an acting career, she appeared in pantomime and toured with the all-Black Temba Theatre Company in Bitter Milk.

== Acting career ==
Emmanuel was a member of the Royal Shakespeare Company from 1983 to 1984. Her stage appearances include the Nurse, a part written for a Black actress, in The Dillen (1983), Sophia de Lyonne in Pam Gems's Camille (1984), and Muriel Farr in Louise Page's Golden Girls (1984), in which Emmanuel appeared with Cathy Tyson, Josette Simon, and Kenneth Branagh. Emmanuel understudied in two Shakespearean productions, Love's Labour's Lost and Measure for Measure, and for the RSC in 1985 she played Johanna in Trilogy of Reunions and Ilona/Marica in The Maple Tree Game. In 1989, Emmanuel played Valeria in Coriolanus at the Young Vic, and in 1997, she played Cleopatra in Antony and Cleopatra at the Bridewell Theatre.

Emmanuel regularly appeared in television dramas and comedies from 1985, including recurring roles as WPC Janice Hargreaves in Rockliffe's Babies and Desmond's, and appeared as Penny Guy in House of Cards (1990). She was also a regular on stage in London during the 1980s and early 1990s, including playing Duckling in This Country's Good (1988) by Timberlake Wertenbaker at the Royal Court Theatre and Lucy in The Recruiting Officer (1988) and Irina Platt in Murmuring Judges by David Hare (1991), both at the National Theatre, and in 1995 she acted in Venice Preserv'd at the Almeida Theatre. Her film roles include Selina in Under Suspicion (1991), Sarah Johnson in Peter's Friends (1992), Camille in Still Crazy (1998), and Miss James in Peggy Su! (1998).

Despite her early success (1983–1991) in classical stage roles, Emmanuel did not appear again with the Royal Shakespeare Company nor the National Theatre. She ascribes the lack of roles for Black actors to institutional racism and prejudice within the industry. Choosing to concentrate on television and film roles, Emmanuel made an appearance as Mrs. Litton in the series Dynasty in 1991 and considered moving to the United States in the hope of more regular acting opportunities. In 1998, she played The Lady in an episode of The Demon Headmaster.

== Recent years ==
In 1999, Emmanuel married American lawyer Marc Rosenfeld, an environmentalist based in Antigua, and now divides her time between London and the Caribbean. In 2002, she returned to the UK to appear as Karen Delage in the BBC drama Fields of Gold. In 2007, she co-founded the Gale Theatre of London and Barbados, appearing as Ruth in Blithe Spirit in the same year. She also co-founded the Caribbean Unity Theatre in Antigua in 2008.
