= Sarah Vaughan (writer) =

British writer

- Born: Sarah Hall; 1972 (age 53–54)
- Education: Brasenose College, Oxford
- Occupation: Novelist
- Writing career
- Pen name: Sarah Vaughan
- Period: 2014–present
- Genres: Psychological thriller Political thriller
- Website: sarahvaughanauthor.com

Sarah Hall (born 1972), best known under the pseudonym Sarah Vaughan, is a British writer and journalist. Until 2008, she worked for The Guardian as a senior reporter, health correspondent, and political correspondent.

She published her first book in 2014. As a novelist, Hall is known for a number of psychological thrillers which often deal with themes such as power and privilege, and the pressures placed on women. Many of her novels have been translated and were successful internationally. Two of her novels have been adapted for television.

== Early life, education and early career ==
Vaughan was born Sarah Hall in 1972, and was brought up in Devon. She read English at Brasenose College, Oxford. After graduating, she started work as a journalist. She worked for The Guardian for eleven years as a senior reporter, health correspondent and political correspondent. In 2008, she left The Guardian and continued as a freelance reporter.

== Writer ==
Using the pseudonym Sarah Vaughan, she published her first novel The art of baking blind in 2014, following a commitment she made on her 40th birthday to write a novel, and find a publisher for it, within a year. The book is about the participants in a baking competition, and was translated into six languages. It was followed two years later by The farm at the edge of the world (2016), which was especially successful in France.

She became known to a wider audience with her third novel Anatomy of a Scandal (2018), a political thriller about a junior government minister accused of rape. She has said that she used her experiences as a political reporter, and as an Oxford student, to explore themes such as power, privilege, and consent. Anatomy of a Scandal received positive reviews, and was in the Sunday Times bestseller list for ten weeks. It was translated into 22 languages and was listed as one of the best novels of the 2010s by Richard and Judy's Book Club. In 2020, Netflix commissioned a mini-series based on the novel, which premiered in April 2022.

Vaughan's next book, Little Disasters (2020), has been described as "a novel about motherhood and madness" and deals with child abuse, postnatal anxiety and maternal OCD, which Vaughan has struggled with herself. Although her book did not have the same level of success as Anatomy of a Scandal, Vaughan was praised for the way she handled the topic of female mental health. The production company Roughcut TV took an option on the books’ screen rights and hired Ruth Fowler to develop a six-part series which she sold to Fremantle and Paramount. Little Disasters released in the UK in May 2025. The series, created by Ruth Fowler, was released in the US on December 11, 2025. Vaughan was not a writer on the show.

Her fifth novel, Reputation, was published in March 2022. It deals with the threats routinely received by women in public life, and social media bullying of young women and girls. The novel received mainly positive reviews, especially for providing an intelligent focus on the harassment of women. It has been optioned for television.

== Bibliography ==
- The Art of Baking Blind 2014 ISBN 978-1444792225
- The Farm at the Edge of the World 2016 ISBN 978-1444792287
- Anatomy of a Scandal 2018 ISBN 978-1501172168
- Little Disasters 2020 ISBN 9781668033524
- Reputation 2022 ISBN 978-1668000069
