= Golden Girls (play) =

1984 play by Louise Page

- Written by: Louise Page
- Original language: English
- Setting: England; Athens

Premiere
- Date premiered: 20 June 1984
- Place premiered: The Other Place, Stratford-upon-Avon

Golden Girls is a 1984 play by Louise Page that was commissioned by the Royal Shakespeare Company and was first performed at The Other Place, premiering on 20 June 1984, directed by Barry Kyle. Before reading the full script for the play, at least nine of the cast members were under the impression that they would be taking the lead role. The same cast performed the play at the Gulbenkian Studio, Newcastle-upon-Tyne from 18 to 23 March 1985 and it transferred, with some cast changes, to The Pit in London, where it played from 29 April to 10 September.

Page commented that she wanted to write a play about the "politics of sport" and that Golden Girls was "about desire and ambition and the ambition to be absolutely the best." The play addresses numerous themes including unfair treatment of women in sport, the difficulties of balancing a personal life with being an elite sportsperson, racism in advertising, and the use of performance-enhancing drugs in sport. Although Page's writing received a mixed critical reception, Kyle's direction was generally praised, and Josette Simon's performance as Dorcas Ableman was acclaimed.

== Plot ==
The British national women's hundred-metres relay team is currently training for an international event in Athens, with their coach and medical staff on hand. The team is sponsored by a cosmetics firm seeking to boost its sales. To enhance performance, the team doctor informs the athletes that they are being administered a new, undetectable fortifying drug, Hydromel. However, on the day of the event, the most ambitious of the athletes, Dorcas, decides to exceed the prescribed dose and is subsequently caught. Although the team wins the race, a scandal erupts. Dorcas receives a lifetime ban, but her ambition continues to haunt her.

== Cast and characters ==
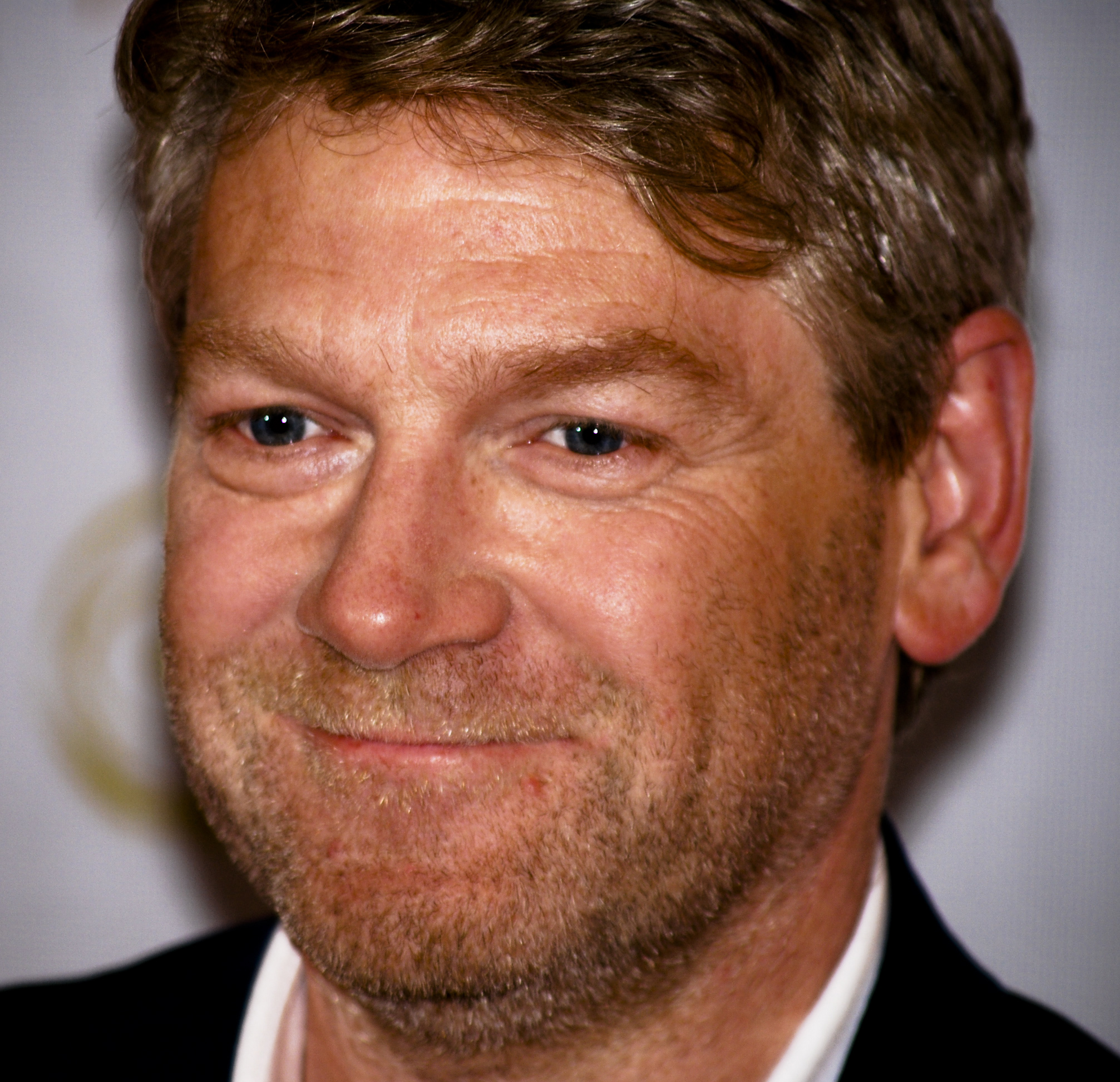
Kenneth Branagh (pictured in 2009) played Mike Bassett

Cast and characters of Golden Girls
Character	Description	Original cast (Note: At The Other Place, Stratford-upon-Avon; and Gulbenkian Studio, Newcastle-upon-Tyne)	London cast
Dorcas Ableman	black athlete	Josette Simon	Josette Simon
Muriel Farr	black athlete	Alphonsia Emmanuel	Alphonsia Emmanuel
Pauline Peterson	white athlete	Katharine Rogers	Katharine Rogers
Sue Kinder	blonde white athlete	Kate Buffery	Sarah Berger
Janet Morris	black athlete	Cathy Tyson	Cathy Tyson
Mike Bassett	white athlete	Kenneth Branagh	Martin Jacobs
Laces Mackenzie	coach	Jimmy Yuill	Jimmy Yuill
Vivien Blackwood	doctor	Jennifer Piercey	Jennifer Piercey
Noël Kinder	Sue Kinder's father	George Raistrick	George Raistrick
Hilary Davenport	sponsor	Polly James	Polly James
Tom Billbow	journalist	Derek Crewe	Derek Crewe
Hotel porter	white	Norman Henry	Norman Henry
The golden girl	everything the name suggests	Jan Revere	Jan Revere

== History ==
=== Background and development ===
Golden Girls was commissioned by the Royal Shakespeare Company (RSC). Author Louise Page later reflected that writing Golden Girls, with a cast twice the size of what she had previously written, "was quite difficult ... I sort of assumed it was going to be half the number of lines for twice the number of people – but it does not work that way at all! And I had to learn to write exit lines. One of the problems with having a lot of characters on stage is how you get them off again." Kenneth Branagh wrote in his autobiography that before the script was available, as many as eight of his fellow cast members were under the impression that they were playing the lead. He recalled that on the first day of rehearsals, the script had still not arrived, and as rehearsals progressed, "Louis's re-writes were arriving very slowly, and everyone was desperately throwing their weight around and implying that they might leave at any moment. The actors felt betrayed, Louise felt persecuted, and [director] Barry. I'm sure, felt both". Branagh and castmate Jimmy Yuill trained with RSC member and fitness enthusiast Brian Blessed as part of their preparation for roles as athletes, while the actresses playing athletes took sprint training. Despite his concerns about the preparation and his own performance, Branagh considered that the first run of performances was successful, and pleased the audiences.

The central role of the Black runner Dorcas Ableman drew on Simon's own experience of being an athlete; Page later related that the play had been rewritten from an ensemble piece, as "the sheer dynamism Josette brought to the role meant that it was her journey through the play with which the audience identified". The play helped establish Page's reputation as a playwright.

=== Productions ===
Golden Girls was first staged by the Royal Shakespeare Company at The Other Place, directed by Barry Kyle, premiering on 20 June 1984. Kit Surrey was the designer, costumes were by Allan Watkins, music was by Ilona Sekacz, and lighting was by Wayne Dowdeswell. The same cast performed the play at the Gulbenkian Studio, Newcastle-upon-Tyne from 18 to 23 March 1985, and it transferred, with some cast changes, to The Pit in London, where it played from 29 April to 10 September. At the Pit, it was commercially successful, playing to near-capacity audiences.

A version amended by Page was presented at the Leeds Playhouse concurrently with the RSC's London run. Later that year, the Wolsey Theatre, Ipswich staged a production. A two-part radio adaptation, written by Page, was broadcast on BBC Radio 4 in May 1986. It was directed by Vanessa Whitburn and included Angela Wynter as Dorcas, Terry Molloy as Bassett, and Berger, Emmanuel and Yuill reprising their roles from the stage versions.

Theatre Calgary presented the play in 1986. Later productions have included those at the Belgrade Theatre, Coventry (1986), Perth, Scotland (1989), The Lilian Baylis Theatre, London (1992), and the Mercury Theatre, Colchester (1996), The play had its American premiere in 1987 with the South Coast Repertory's production.

== Themes ==
Page commented that she wanted to write a play about the "politics of sport" and that Golden Girls was "about desire and ambition and the ambition to be absolutely the best." Like her other plays of the early 1980s, Golden Girls was critical of the UK's class system, favouring Socialist values in opposition to the materialistic values of Thatcherism. The play can be regarded as a comedy, as it uses irony while lacking traditional comic themes.

Themes of the play include the unfair treatment of women in sport, the difficulties of balancing a personal life with being an elite sportsperson, racism in advertising, the use of performance-enhancing drugs in sport, and sport psychology. When the sponsor's representative declares that the team should be mainly white, "the resulting dialogue evokes the anti-Apartheid mood of the time, which saw South African teams banned from international competitions."

== Reception ==
Page's writing of Golden Girls received a mixed critical reception, while the response to Kyle's direction was largely positive. The Daily Telegraph critic Eric Shorter praised the cast's efforts but felt that the play suffered from overly slow pacing, while Mel Gussow of The New York Times wrote that "the play has intelligence and momentum"

Sheridan Morley of Punch, The Mail on Sunday's Nicholas de Jongh, and Gussow commended the interplay of multiple themes. The Times critic Irving Wardle felt that although the play kept a coherent narrative despite the various themes, but it was "hard to see what the play is driving at." Ros Asquith in The Observer Jim Hiley of The Listener and Anne McFerran of Time Out complained that there were too many strands in the play.

Starring as Dorcas Ableman was a breakthrough role for Josette Simon. Her performance was "unanimously praised" according to the literature scholar Kurt Eisen; she won the Plays & Players magazine award for best actress The Financial Times reviewer Michael Coveney wrote that "The immense power and beauty of this actress is at last given proper opportunity by the RSC." Asquith felt that Simon's performance was among the most thrilling in London.

Golden Girls was one of twelve nominees for the 1985 Susan Smith Blackburn Prize for a woman playwright writing in English. In his 2020 obituary of Page, published in The Stage, Michael Quinn wrote that Golden Girls was Pages' "greatest success" and that it "ambitiously addressed a plethora of personal and political issues associated with high-profile sports tournaments."
