= Rockliffe (TV series) =

British television police procedural series

- DVD cover
- Also known as: Rockliffe's Babies; Rockliffe's Folly
- Genre: Police procedural
- Created by: Richard O'Keeffe
- Written by: Richard O'Keefe; Don Webb
- Directed by: David Attwood
- Starring: Ian Hogg; Bill Champion; John Blakely; Brett Fancy; Joe McGann; Martyn Ellis; Susanna Shelling; Alphonsia Emmanuel; Brian Croucher; James Aubrey; Ian Brimble; Aaron Harris; Carole Nimmons; Craig Nightingale
- Theme music composer: Joe Campbell; Paul Hart
- Country of origin: United Kingdom
- Original language: English
- No. of series: 3
- No. of episodes: 25

Production
- Producers: Leonard Lewis; Ron Craddock
- Production locations: Kensal Rise; Wessex
- Editor: Nigel Cattle
- Camera setup: Paul Harding
- Running time: 50 minutes
- Production company: BBC Studios

Original release
- Network: BBC1
- Release: 9 January 1987 – 14 December 1988

Rockliffe is a British television police procedural drama series, produced by the BBC, which ran for three series between 9 January 1987 and 14 December 1988. Rockliffe was devised by Richard O'Keeffe, and produced by Leonard Lewis. The first two series, entitled Rockliffe's Babies, starred Ian Hogg as Alan Rockliffe, a detective sergeant assigned to train a team of inexperienced plain-clothed Crime Squad PCs in inner-city London, which include Steve Hood (Brett Fancy), Gerry O'Dowd (Joe McGann), David Adams (Bill Champion), Janice Hargreaves (Alphonsia Emmanuel), Paul Georgiou (Martyn Ellis), Keith Chitty (John Blakely) and Karen Walsh (Susanna Shelling). The series featured writing contributions from Richard O`Keeffe, Don Webb, Charlie Humphreys and Nick Perry, and was directed by Derek Lister, Keith Washington, Clive Fleury and David Attwood.

The third series, entitled Rockliffe's Folly, followed Rockliffe through his relocation to Wessex Police, dealing with rural crimes as part of a new team of investigators. The seven episode third series proved to be the last, with many citing a change in the programme's formula for the heavy decline in viewing figures. Many viewers stated that the success of the two Babies series came not from Rockliffe himself, but from the popular ensemble cast. Most of the location filming featured in the first two series took place around the Kensal Rise area of West London. Notably, the police station interiors were at Canalot Studios, Kensal Road. A paperback novel was released as a tie-in to the first series on 11 December 1986, four weeks before the broadcast of the first episode. After many years of remaining unreleased, the complete series was released on DVD by Network distributing on 8 May 2017.

== Cast ==
- Ian Hogg as DS Alan Rockliffe

=== Rockliffe's Babies ===
- Bill Champion as PC David Adams
- John Blakey as PC Keith Chitty
- Brett Fancy as PC Steve Hood
- Joe McGann as PC Gerry O'Dowd
- Martyn Ellis as PC Paul Georgiou
- Susanna Shelling as WPC Karen Walsh
- Alphonsia Emmanuel as WPC Janice Hargreaves
- Brian Croucher as Chief Superintendent Barry Wyatt
- Bill McCabe as Sergeant Benyon
- Edward Wilson as DI Charlie Flight
- Malcolm Terris as Detective Superintendent Munro

=== Rockliffe's Folly ===
- James Aubrey as DI Derek Hoskins
- Ian Brimble as Inspector Leslie Yaxley
- Aaron Harris DC Paul Whitmore
- Carole Nimmons as Sergeant Rachel Osborne
- Craig Nightingale as PC Guy Overton
- Elizabeth Henry as WPC Hester Goswell
- John Hartley as PC Alfred Duggan

== Episodes ==
=== Series 1: Rockliffe's Babies (1987) ===
No.	Title	Directed by	Written by	Original release date
1	"Sirens"	David Attwood	Richard O'Keeffe	9 January 1987
A hooded prowler, an armed robbery, a mugging on the notorious Dragon Estate – it's a busy week for the young PCs. But O'Dowd is in dead trouble. Will the oil-rich Sonia Souhami come to his rescue?
2	"Sweet and Sour Revenge"	Derek Lister	Richard O'Keeffe	16 January 1987
A murder has been committed and Rockliffe has been given the name of a suspect. The name revives old and bitter memories. But is it fifteen years too late to do any good?
3	"It's All Happening"	Jeremy Ancock	Charlie Humphreys	23 January 1987
Rockliffe complains about the work load. There are drug dealers, rapists, muggers, murderers, thieves and con-men around. What can turn up next? Joseph Maxwell, that's what.
4	"A Bad Few Days"	David Attwood	Brian Thompson	30 January 1987
There is a tricky case of race relations for Rockliffe and his officers when a black teenager with a mental age of six goes missing.
5	"In the Bag"	Derek Lister	Don Webb	6 February 1987
Why has the habitually lazy Paul Georgiou activated himself and acquired an informant?
6	"Ghetto-Blasters"	Jeremy Ancock	Richard O'Keeffe	13 February 1987
There's a tense situation in the black community. A man has died in police custody as a result of using a deadly drug. Rockliffe and Flight think they know who the dealer is, but if they act will there be worse trouble?
7	"Up the Down Escalator"	David Attwood	Nick Perry	20 February 1987
What arises for Rockliffe and the crime squad as a result of hunger pangs?
8	"Extra Curricular"	Derek Lister	Don Webb	27 February 1987
Rockliffe is surprised to learn that some members of his squad find him unapproachable. Doesn't he always come to their aid when they need him? And that's just what he has to do when Adams goes out on a limb.

=== Series 2: Rockliffe's Babies 2 (1988) ===
No.	Title	Directed by	Written by	Original release date
1	"Go for It"	Leonard Lewis	Richard O'Keeffe	8 January 1988
It's Dorset wedding bells for Keith Chitty and best man Gerry O'Dowd decides to enter into the swing of things. Gerry's taking no chances and neither is Rockliffe. When their paths cross back in town they both get more than they bargained for.
2	"A Trip to the Zoo"	Clive Fleury	Richard O'Keeffe	15 January 1988
Members of Rockliffe's crime squad make hasty character assessments. Wayne is an animal, Chris is a charmer. Both judgments have to be revised on closer inspection.
3	"In Too Deep"	Keith Washington	Don Webb	22 January 1988
Why are the officers of Church Street police station tuning in to a local radio station? And why does Rockliffe allow himself to be involved in a situation which causes so much disapproval from on high?
4	"Looking After Your Own"	David Attwood	Brian Thompson	29 January 1988
It's not a crime to photograph police activity, but when it happens during an investigation into serious assaults on women, Rockliffe is suspicious. What he discovers puts him into the most disagreeable situation of his career.
5	"Easy Meat"	Clive Fleury	Don Webb	12 February 1988
Rockliffe's team is in hospital. They are watching for someone who is frightening the nurses. But when a nurse is hurt in their full view, they realise they have a different and more urgent situation on their hands.
6	"A Very Diplomatic Incident"	Keith Washington	Terry Hodgkinson	19 February 1988
It is a night of routine surveillance for the Crime Squad. All is quiet, but not for long. Rockliffe and his team soon find themselves in areas of enquiry that are foreign to them and where there are choices to be made between public justice and private revenge.
7	"Top Man"	David Attwood	Nick Perry	26 February 1988
Acting on information received seems more important to Rockliffe than taking notice of a memo from the Chief Superintendent. Embarrassment results, except for Georgiou, who volunteers for a very risky adventure.
8	"Black Arrow"	Clive Fleury	Don Webb	4 March 1988
The two married members of Rockliffe's team have a dinner engagement, but the demands of duty put paid to their plans. An entirely different night out on the town is arranged for them – spiced with an element of risk.
9	"Hearts and Flowers"	Diarmuid Lawrence	Richard O'Keeffe	11 March 1988
Rockliffe thinks WPC Walsh is too preoccupied with the problems of a homeless family. But he is not entirely impartial himself when it comes to associating with an attractive titled woman who seems to be unattached.
10	"The One That Got Away"	Leonard Lewis	Richard O'Keeffe	18 March 1988
Before Rockliffe and his team can start to look for three villains who got away they must find out who they were. It's a challenge that exercises all their ingenuity and certain members of the team have other things on their minds: three of them have selection boards for the Detective Training School.

=== Series 3: Rockliffe's Folly (1988) ===
No.	Title	Directed by	Written by	Original release date
1	"The Greenhorn"	Diarmuid Lawrence	Susannah Hagan	2 November 1988
Rockliffe has swapped his fraught, round-the-clock job at the Met for the rural beat of Wessex. But when he nearly runs over a distraught woman, Rockliffe finds that leafy lanes hold their own peril.
2	"Moving Targets"	Ken Hannam	Stephen Gallagher	9 November 1988
Two young boys, reported missing from a council home, have been seen on Rockliffe's Patch. Can he catch up with them before they are caught in a real disaster?
3	"Witch Hunt"	Keith Godman	Vincent O'Connell	16 November 1988
When a young girl in trouble reminds Rockliffe of his daughter Kathleen, Rockliffe decides it is definitely time to sort out his homelife and job.
4	"Lie of the Land"	Eric Davidson	John McNeil	23 November 1988
An elusive green van is linked to a series of burglaries, but there's something fishy about the theft which attractive Miss Dawson is reporting. And can those lovey-dovey newlyweds really be genuine?
5	"On the Big Wheel"	Tristan de Vere Cole	Richard O'Keeffe	30 November 1988
Rockliffe has to contend with a name from his past.
6	"The Blind Man"	Ron Craddock	John Foster	7 December 1988
An anonymous phone call warns Rockliffe that a blind farm owner is about to be murdered, and then his daughter wants to meet the new girlfriend.
7	"Nine-Tenths of the Law"	Alan Wareing	Susannah Hagan	14 December 1988
Someone is buying a lot of land on Rockliffe's patch. but business is definitely not proceeding as usual.
