= Rules of the Game (TV series) =

British television drama

- Genre: Drama; Thriller
- Created by: Ruth Fowler
- Written by: Ruth Fowler
- Directed by: Jennifer Sheridan
- Starring: Maxine Peake; Rakhee Thakrar
- Composer: Edmund Butt
- Country of origin: United Kingdom
- Original language: English
- No. of series: 1
- No. of episodes: 4

Production
- Executive producers: George Faber; Ayela Butt; Mark Pybus; Lucy Richer
- Producer: Simon Meyers
- Cinematography: Milos Moore
- Running time: 60 mins.
- Production company: The Forge Entertainment

Original release
- Network: BBC One
- Release: 11 January – 19 January 2022

Rules of the Game is a four-part British television drama series, directed by Jennifer Sheridan and written by Ruth Fowler. It stars Maxine Peake as a sportswear executive who deals with the fallout of an employee's shocking death in her company's office building. It aired on BBC One from 11 to 19 January 2022.

== Synopsis ==
Sam (Peake) is the chief operating officer at a family-run sportswear business in Northern England. When an employee turns up dead in the foyer, seemingly by suicide, Sam is forced to reflect on the company's problematic culture and events stretching back an entire decade, and another death.

== Cast ==
- Maxine Peake as Sam
- Rakhee Thakrar as Maya
- Susan Wokoma as DI Eve Preston
- Kieran Bew as Gareth Jenkins
- Ben Batt as Owen Jenkins
- Dario Coates as DS Peter Alan
- Callie Cooke as Tess Jones
- Megan Parkinson as Gemma Thompson
- Tanya Vital as Beth Taylor
- Katherine Pearce as Carys Jenkins
- Zoë Tapper as Vanessa Jenkins
- Alison Steadman as Anita Jenkins
- Amy Leeson as Amy Dixon
- Dominic Vulliamy as Duncan Stephenson

== Production ==
Fowler was inspired to write the series by the Harvey Weinstein scandals. The series was filmed in Manchester, the north west of England and also in Frodsham.

== Episodes ==
No.	Title	Directed by	Written by	Original release date	UK viewers (millions)
1	"Episode 1"	Jennifer Sheridan	Ruth Fowler	11 January 2022	N/A
2	"Episode 2"	Jennifer Sheridan	Ruth Fowler	12 January 2022	N/A
3	"Episode 3"	Jennifer Sheridan	Ruth Fowler	18 January 2022	N/A
4	"Episode 4"	Jennifer Sheridan	Ruth Fowler	19 January 2022	N/A

== Reception ==
Lucy Mangan of The Guardian awarded the first episode four stars out of five, praising the writing and its weaving together of commentary and mystery elements, and dubbed Peake's work 'another barnstorming performance'. Anita Singh of The Daily Telegraph also gave it four out of five stars, calling the show 'high on entertainment value'. Ed Cumming from The Independent gave the first episode two out of five stars, claiming 'the script and performances have all the subtlety of a boss’ hand up a skirt at the Christmas do.'.
