= Under Suspicion (1991 film) =

1991 British film by Simon Moore

- Theatrical release poster
- Directed by: Simon Moore
- Written by: Simon Moore
- Produced by: Brian Eastman
- Starring: Liam Neeson; Laura San Giacomo; Kenneth Cranham
- Cinematography: Vernon Layton
- Edited by: Tariq Anwar
- Music by: Christopher Gunning
- Production companies: Carnival Films; London Weekend Television; The Rank Organisation
- Distributed by: Rank Film Distributors
- Release date: 27 September 1991
- Running time: 100 minutes
- Country: United Kingdom
- Language: English
- Budget: $6 million
- Box office: $221,295

Under Suspicion is a 1991 British neo noir erotic thriller film written and directed by Simon Moore and starring Liam Neeson and Laura San Giacomo. Neeson won best actor at the 1992 Festival du Film Policier de Cognac for his performance.

== Plot ==
Tony Aaron is a police investigator living in Brighton on the south coast of Great Britain at the end of the 1950s. He has been assigned to watch the house of Powers, a local criminal, along with Frank, his colleague and friend. Tony leaves Frank to go inside the house and continue an affair with Hazel, Powers's wife. When Powers returns home early and discovers the pair, he retrieves his shotgun to shoot the lovers but is disturbed by Frank and in the ensuing chaos shoots another police officer, Colin, killing him.

Two years later over Christmas 1959, Tony has left the force and is working as an unsuccessful private detective who is heavily in debt. His specialty is faking evidence of adultery for use in divorce cases, a common trick to obtain a divorce in England and Wales at the time. He collects a customer from the station and runs through his routine of extorting more money by claiming that he has to use a more expensive hotel and substitutes his wife in place of an obvious prostitute.

A few days later, Tony is seen collecting a new customer and running through the same routine. When he goes to the hotel room to photograph the customer and his wife in bed, Tony finds they have both been shot dead. In the investigation, it is revealed that Tony's customer was Stasio, a famous painter who was seeking a divorce from his wife Selina to enable him to marry another woman named Angeline. Following the murder, Stasio's thumb had been cut off. Both Tony and Frank start to investigate the crime, separately visiting Angeline and Selina. Stasio's will reveals that he left everything to Angeline and nothing to Selina.

Tony and Angeline become lovers, and he discovers that Stasio had imprinted his thumb on his paintings to prove their authenticity. Tony uses his time in the house to search Stasio's studio for evidence. As the investigation continues, suspicion falls on Tony when the gun used is found in the hotel's furnace and it is traced back to him. In an attempt to prove Tony's innocence, Frank puts pressure on Roscoe to reveal evidence that Tony is innocent after discovering Roscoe is engaging rent boys, but Roscoe commits suicide and leaves an incriminating note alleging Tony's guilt. Tony is arrested and put on trial, where he is found guilty of murdering the pair when it is revealed that he married for her money and wished to leave her. Angeline is a surprise prosecution witness and testifies that she saw a man climbing over the roof of the hotel before the shooting and, when the man stopped for a cigarette, she witnessed him bang the lighter twice on his hand then shaking it twice before it would light – a unique sequence that Tony uses. Tony is sentenced to be hanged.

On the night before the hanging, Frank returns to Stasio's house, where he finds Stasio's thumb inside Angeline's paint box. He returns to the prison just in time to stop Tony's hanging. Meanwhile, Angeline is arrested trying to leave the country and is tried for Stasio's murder. Tony makes plans to leave the country and visits Angeline in prison, where she deduces that Tony and Selina worked together to frame her. Tony whispers in Angeline's ear whether he was responsible for Stasio and Hazel's murder.

Tony meets Selina in Miami, who tells him that she has started releasing Stasio's paintings onto the open market. She writes him a cheque for services unknown. She chides Tony for having fallen in love with Angeline, which led to him delaying the planting of the thumb in Angeline's paint box. In the film's closing moments, a dejected Tony is seen using his lighter in the manner described by Angeline in court.

== Cast ==
- Liam Neeson as Tony Aaron
- Laura San Giacomo as Angeline
- Kenneth Cranham as Frank
- Maggie O'Neill as Hazel Aaron
- Stephen Moore as Roscoe
- Alphonsia Emmanuel as Selina
- Alex Norton as Prosecuting Attorney
- Kevin Moore as Barrister
- Alan Talbot as Powers
- Malcolm Storry as Waterston
- Martin Grace as Colin
- Stephen Oxley as Hotel Deskman
- Colin Dudley as Hotel Waiter
- Richard Graham as Denny
- Alison Ruffelle as 1st Chambermaid
- Michael Almaz as Stasio

== Production ==
Simon Moore was best known at the time for writing Traffik. It was three years between writing the script and getting finance. Part of the finance came from the Rank Organisation.

Filming started under the title The Other Woman.

== Release ==
=== Reception ===
On review aggregator website Rotten Tomatoes gives the film a rating of 25% based on reviews from 8 critics.
