= Josette Simon =

British actress (born 1959/60)

Josette Simon OBE
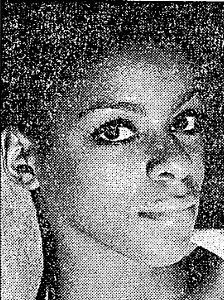
- Simon in 1988
- Born: Josette Patricia Simon; 1959 or 1960 (age 66–67); Leicester, England
- Education: Central School of Speech and Drama
- Occupation: Actor
- Years active: 1974–present
- Spouse: Mark Padmore (divorced)
- Children: 1

Josette Patricia Simon (born 1959 or 1960) is a British actress who played the part of Dayna Mellanby in the third and fourth series of the television sci-fi series Blake's 7 from 1980 to 1981. She trained at the Central School of Speech and Drama in London and performed as a 14-year-old in the choir for the world premiere of the finalised Joseph and the Amazing Technicolor Dreamcoat. She has continued a career in stage productions, appearing in 50 Royal Shakespeare Company (RSC) productions, from the single press night performance as a featured character in Salvation Now at the Warehouse theatre in 1982, through to playing Cleopatra in a six-month run of Antony and Cleopatra at the Royal Shakespeare Theatre in 2017. The first black woman in an RSC play when she appeared in Salvation Now, Simon has been at the forefront of colour-blind casting (while disliking the term), playing roles traditionally taken by white actors, including Maggie, a character who is thought to be based on Marilyn Monroe, in Arthur Miller's After the Fall at the Royal National Theatre in 1990.

Simon's first leading role at the RSC, the first principal part filled by a black woman for the company, was as Rosaline, in Love's Labour's Lost, in 1984. In 1987, she appeared for the RSC again, in the lead role of Isabelle in Measure for Measure. Later leading roles for the RSC saw her as Titania/Hippolyta in A Midsummer Night's Dream (1999–2000) and Cleopatra in Antony and Cleopatra (2017–2018). She has played numerous other roles across stage, television, film, and radio. She starred alongside Brenda Fricker in the two-part television series Seekers (1993), written by Lynda La Plante. Simon has portrayed senior police officers in Silent Witness (1998), Minder (2009), and Broadchurch (2017); and portrayed a defence lawyer in Anatomy of a Scandal (2022).

Simon won the Evening Standard's Best Actress award, a Critics' Circle Theatre Award, and Plays and Players Critic Awards for After the Fall and two film festival awards for her part in Milk and Honey (1988). She was made an Officer of the Order of the British Empire in 2000, for services to drama.

== Early life ==
Josette Patricia Simon was born in 1959 or 1960 in Leicester. Her mother, from Anguilla, and her father, from Antigua, had both moved to the United Kingdom in the 1950s and worked at Thorn EMI. Simon attended Mellor Street primary school, followed by Alderman Newton's Girls' School. She became interested in acting after getting a place in the choir, at age 14, for the world premiere of the finalised version of Joseph and the Amazing Technicolor Dreamcoat, presented in Leicester in 1974. Simon later appeared in pantomimes before finishing secondary school, and played Martha in a 1976 production of The Miracle Worker directed by Michael Bogdanov at the Leicester Haymarket Theatre. Alan Rickman, who was in the production of Joseph and the Amazing Technicolor Dreamcoat, encouraged Simon to apply for the Central School of Speech and Drama in London and she was accepted.

== Career ==
=== Blake's 7 ===
Simon won the part of Dayna Mellanby in the BBC 1 television sci-fi series Blake's 7 after being talent-spotted while still at the Central School of Speech and Drama. She played Mellanby in the third and fourth series, originally broadcast between January 1980 and December 1981. The character was an expert combatant and highly knowledgeable about weapons. Andrew Muir, author of a book about the series, felt that Simon provided "energy, vitality, innocence, danger, and a real physical presence" to the character. Another author who wrote about the show, Tom Powers, felt that Mellanby and the other women heroes were often eclipsed by the male leads, and that over the series, Mellanby, who did not achieve her ambition to avenge her father's death by killing the villainous character Servalan, "lost her agency as a heroic figure of lex talionis".

Simon was invited to return to the role in audio productions by Big Finish but declined, but has played other roles for the company.

She also featured in two other programmes in 1980: the sitcom The Cuckoo Waltz and the teen drama The Squad.

=== Royal Shakespeare Company and Royal National Theatre ===
Simon has performed frequently with the Royal Shakespeare Company (RSC) and Royal National Theatre. After taking part in a reading of Salvation Now by Snoo Wilson in 1982, she was cast as one of the three "weird sisters" in Macbeth alongside Kathy Behean and Lesley Sharp later that year. She was the first black woman to appear in a Shakespeare play at the RSC. In the same RSC season, she had roles in Much Ado About Nothing, as a spirit in The Tempest and as Iras in Antony and Cleopatra. In 1997, Simon told academic Alison Oddey that working with Michael Gambon and, particularly, Helen Mirren on Antony and Cleopatra provided an early influence on her career. She was with the RSC for two consecutive two-year season cycles. In the second cycle her roles included Nerissa in The Merchant Of Venice and starring as Dorcas Ableman in Golden Girls, which became a breakthrough role for her. The Financial Times reviewer Michael Coveney wrote of the latter role that "The immense power and beauty of this actress is at last given proper opportunity by the RSC." Ros Asquith of The Observer felt that Simon's performance was among the most thrilling in London, and The Daily Telegraph critic Eric Shorter praised the cast's efforts but felt that the play suffered from overly slow pacing. The central role of a black runner drew on Simon's own experience of being an athlete; the play's author, Louise Page, later related that the play had been rewritten from an ensemble piece, as "the sheer dynamism Josette brought to the role meant that it was her journey through the play with which the audience identified".

Simon has been at the forefront of colour-blind casting, playing roles traditionally taken by white actors. From the mid-1980s to the late 1990s, a time when it was unusual for black women to feature as leads in Shakespeare plays, Simon played several major roles for the RSC. Her first leading role, and the first for a black woman at the RSC, was as Rosaline, in Love's Labour's Lost, directed by Barry Kyle, in 1984. Jami Rogers, in her book British Black and Asian Shakespeareans (2022) commented that in Kyle's production, where the women were dressed in Belle Époque-style silk dresses, Rosaline's clothing "immediately marked her as a woman of high status ... For the first time on a major British stage, an African-Caribbean woman portrayed an intelligent, witty and strong leading Shakespearean character." Rogers described the reviews of the production as "glowing". She noted that some reviewers and academics "treated Josette Simon's casting ... as a novelty", criticising the description of integrated casting as an "experiment" as "deeply problematic as it infers the practice is an aberration rather than what it was [by 1990], a common practice".

Simon told Oddey that despite being conscious of discussions about whether audiences would accept a black woman as Rosaline, "I also felt that you should be allowed to fail, because if you don't take risks you can't reach higher planes" and that she had focused on her performance rather than debates around her casting, saying that "If I had thought about those things beforehand, I would not have set foot on the stage". She told Veronica Groocock, author of Women Mean Business (1988), that sexism had been as much of an issue as racism in her career, although the problem reduced as she gained larger roles. Nine years later, she expressed her dissatisfaction with the lack of good roles for women, which she ascribed to the industry being male-dominated and complained that, "I think that we've seen more and more trivialising of actresses, requiring them to look gorgeous and take their top off at some point."

In 1987, Simon appeared for the RSC again, in the lead role of Isabelle in Measure for Measure, directed by Nicholas Hynter; her performance received some critical acclaim, whist other commentators felt it was "underpowered and lacking in emotional intensity". Irving Wardle wrote in The Times that the plot and casting demanded that Simon's "Isabella should be the only nobly uncorrupted figure on stage ... and Miss Simon, a burnished icon of impassioned purity, fulfills it to the letter ... The penalty is that she emerges as less humanly interesting than the surrounding hypocrites and sensualists." The Sunday Telegraph critic Francis King considered her performance to be "appealing and tough". Coveney of the Financial Times felt that Simon "fails ... with the full range of the role. Like so many of this season's leading ladies, she is technically underpowered." The play transferred to the Theatre Royal, Newcastle and then to the Barbican in 1988. Financial Times critic Martin Hoyle wrote of the Barbican production that Simon "has transformed her voice, both timbre and enunciation .... Incisive, vocally varied, though slightly lacking the full weight for the early emotional climaxes, she gives the best performance I have seen from her, dignified and touching." In The Times in 1991, Benedict Nightingale opined that by casting Simon as Isabella and Rosaline, and Hugh Quarshie in other plays, the RSC had been "launching two performers of huge potential".

In 2014, the RSC's Head of Casting, Hannah Miller, explained that the RSC's policy was to select the best actor for the role regardless of factors including gender, race, class, and disability status. The drama and theatre scholar Lynette Goddard argued that despite the RSC's inclusive policy, black women actors still had limited opportunities to progress, "which makes Josette Simon's case all the more compelling". Goddard commented that "the more well known Simon became, the less compelled reviewers felt to mention race". Simon told David Jays of The Guardian in 2017 that "I hate the term 'black actor' ... I'm black, which I'm proud of, but it doesn't mean anything. You're an actor, full stop." Colour-blind casting also applied when Simon played Maggie in Arthur Miller's After the Fall at the National Theatre in 1990. The character was thought to have been based on Marilyn Monroe, who was married to Miller. It was a performance that won Simon the Evening Standard's Best Actress award, Critics' Circle Theatre Award and Plays and Players Critic Awards. Miller attended rehearsals for two weeks, and Simon told Oddey that, like playing Rosaline, meeting Miller was one of the key moments in her career, and the experience helped her to focus on her work and disregard distractions. Simon portrayed Vittoria in the Royal National Theatre's The White Devil in 1991.

Simon returned to the RSC in 1999 as Queen Elizabeth in Don Carlos. Nightingale described her performance as "vivid and vital". Next, she was Titania/Hippolyta in A Midsummer Night's Dream. The Financial Times reviewer wrote that Simon spoke "Titania's lines with an almost jazz musicality, dances, moves, and stands with compelling power. Her stance alone is more regal than that of several of today's ballerinas." Paul Taylor of The Independent called the production's Nicolas Jones and Simon "the sexiest, most commanding Oberon and Titania of recent years".

In 2017, Simon took the role of Cleopatra in Antony and Cleopatra for the RSC. Michael Billington wrote for The Guardian that "Simon seems born to play Cleopatra and she gives us a hypnotically mercurial figure whose eroticism is expressed through a permanent restlessness", although he felt that Simon employed too many voices in the role. Making a similar criticism about the range of accents used, Ian Shuttleworth of the Financial Times felt that Simon failed to play to her strengths as an actor and concluded that "On the occasion of Simon's first RSC appearance this century, she is heartbreaking in all the wrong ways." Ann Treneman of The Times felt that Simon, with a performance that was "quite bonkers" at times, provided the highlight of the show, despite a "lamentable lack of chemistry" between her and Anthony Byrne as Antony. The literature scholar Jyotsna Singh commented that critics' responses, although positive, contained "racialized and gendered inflections", and tended to highlight Simon's "rendering of a histrionic and passionate woman, falling back on Western sexual stereotypes about 'exotic' women of colour" while not considering the multi-faceted nature of the character that Simon herself spoke about.

In The Rise of the English Actress (1993), author Sandra Richards wrote that Simon's "special brand of integrity has gained her a number of 'strong women' roles that are setting a precedent for British actresses from ethnic minorities and reinforcing the contemporary actress's need for roles that not only avoid stereotype but also challenge the limits of her own personality."

=== Other roles ===
Simon took the title role in the 1985 BBC Radio 3 production of Mirandolina. She was the lead in David Zane Mairowitz's play Dictator Gal, broadcast on the same station in 1992. Her character was married to an exiled dictator who was dying in hospital. Simon's character sang a range of songs, including Richard Wagner and Motown compositions in an attempt to revive him. Her performance earned her a Prix Futura Award nomination.

Simon's film appearances include the part of Dr. Ramphele in Cry Freedom (1987). She was nominated as Best Actress at the Genie Awards for Milk and Honey (1988), in which she played Joanna, who left Jamaica with her child to work as a nanny in Toronto. Rick Groen of The Globe and Mail wrote that Simon's "riveting performance ... carries the picture" for the first part, but felt that from the second act onward, the film descended into histrionics. In the San Francisco Chronicle, Judy Stone praised Simon's performance as Joanna, commenting that "she displays a quality of grace all too rare in today's films".

The 1992 television play Bitter Harvest had Simon in the lead role, as a woman who has gone missing after travelling to the Dominican Republic as an aid worker and whose parents go there in search of her. The English Literature scholar Claire Tylee considered that Simon's character was a "credible protagonist", but the film was adversely affected by a mismatch between its thriller and family plotlines. After Simon had already accepted the leading role based on an outline the producer Charles Pattinson pitched, the scriptwriter Winsome Pinnock altered the storyline to include tensions in the mixed-race family. According to Tylee, neither Simon's character or the character of her father were enough like typical thriller heroes to "successfully play on thriller conventions, and the plots end by humiliating both of them, fetishising the black female body along the way."

In 1993, Simon starred alongside Brenda Fricker in the two-part television series Seekers, written by Lynda La Plante. Their characters discovered that they were both married to the same man, who has disappeared. They later worked as partners in the detective agency that he had founded. Lynda Gilbey of Sunday Life wrote that the show was "a first class detective drama ... beautifully plotted, wonderfully performed". The Newcastle Journal reviewer Norman Davison commented that the two lead actors "invested the roles with the sort of power that all La Plante women seem to have and the men were all the wimps".

Nightingale of The Times wrote in a negative review of Jean Genet's play The Maids in 1997 that Simon provided the "one strong performance". She had a recurring role as a defence lawyer in Anatomy of a Scandal in 2022. Her supporting performance in Crossfire (2022) was highlighted as one of the few positives in a negative review of the series by Anita Singh of The Daily Telegraph. Simon has played senior police officers in Silent Witness (1998), Minder (2009), and Broadchurch (2017), and has been cast as Chief Commissioner Camberwell in Anansi Boys, which was in production as of May 2022. In 2019 she appeared as Grams in the film Detective Pikachu.

== Personal life ==
Simon married the tenor Mark Padmore; the couple had one daughter together (b. c. 2000–2001) before they divorced; in a 2020 interview, Simon still refers to Padmore as a "life-long friend". With her dog Milo, Simon visits patients through the charity Pets As Therapy. She supports the Kaos Signing Choir for Deaf and Hearing Children, and several other groups that aid deaf people. She plays the saxophone recreationally, and practices Ashtanga yoga.

== Honours and awards ==
In 1995, Simon was awarded an honorary Master of Arts degree by the University of Leicester. In the 2000 Birthday Honours she was appointed an Officer of the Order of the British Empire (OBE), for services to drama. She received a Pioneers and Achievers award in 1998, in recognition of being one of the people from Leicester who had "paved the way for the next generations of African Caribbean people to achieve and excel in a diverse range of professions and spheres of influence".

Acting awards and nominations
Award	Year (Note: Indicates the year of ceremony)	Nominated work	Category	Result	Ref.
Atlantic Film Festival of Canada	1988	Milk and Honey	Best Actress	Won	
Genie Awards	1989	Milk and Honey	Best Actress	Nominated	
Creteil International Women's Film Festival Awards	1990	Milk and Honey	Best Actress	Won	
Evening Standard Theatre Awards	1990	After the Fall	Best Actress	Won	
Plays and Players Critic Awards	1990	After the Fall	Best Actress	Won	
Critics' Circle Theatre Award	1990	After the Fall	Best Actress	Won	
Laurence Olivier Awards	1991	After the Fall	Best Actress	Nominated	
Prix Futura Award	1993	Dictator Gal		Nominated	
