= Little Disasters =

British television series

- Genre: Thriller
- Created by: Ruth Fowler
- Based on: Little Disasters by Sarah Vaughan
- Written by: Ruth Fowler; Amanda Duke
- Directed by: Eva Sigurðardóttir
- Starring: Diane Kruger; Jo Joyner; Ben Bailey Smith; Shelley Conn; Emily Taaffe
- Country of origin: United Kingdom
- Original language: English
- No. of episodes: 6

Production
- Executive producers: Ash Atalla; Sarah Vaughan; Alex Smith; Simon Judd; Marianna Abbotts
- Producer: Myf Hopkins
- Running time: 45–47 minutes
- Production companies: Roughcut Television; Fremantle

Original release
- Network: Paramount+
- Release: 22 May 2025

Little Disasters is a 2025 television limited series that was released on Paramount+. The series is created by Ruth Fowler; it is written by Fowler and Amanda Duke. It is based on the novel of the same name by Sarah Vaughan. It is directed by Eva Sigurðardóttir and produced by Roughcut Television, in association with Fremantle. It stars Jo Joyner, Diane Kruger, and Ben Bailey Smith. It was released on Paramount+ in the United Kingdom and Ireland on 22 May 2025.

== Premise ==
An accident and emergency doctor treating an unexplained head injury on the child of one of her best friends faces the dilemma of whether to subsequently make a report to child social services.

== Cast ==
- Diane Kruger as Jess
- Jo Joyner as Liz, an A&E doctor
- Ben Bailey Smith as Nick, Liz's husband
- Shelley Conn as Charlotte
- Emily Taaffe as Mel
- JJ Feild as Ed, Jess' husband
- Stephen Campbell Moore as Rob, Mel's partner
- Patrick Baladi as Andrew, Charlotte's lawyer husband

== Production ==
=== Development ===
The six-part limited series was commissioned by Paramount+ in May 2023. It was produced by Roughcut Television in association with Fremantle. The series is created by Ruth Fowler and written by Fowler and Amanda Duke. It was adapted for the screen from the Sarah Vaughan novel Little Disasters (2020), with Roughcut Television executive producers Ash Atalla, Alex Smith and Marianna Abbotts alongside Vaughan, as well as Simon Judd for Fremantle. Eva Sigurðardóttir directed all six episodes, and Myf Hopkins serves as series producer.

=== Casting ===
The cast is led by Diane Kruger and Jo Joyner, who are joined by Emily Taaffe, Shelley Conn, Patrick Baladi, Stephen Campbell Moore, JJ Feild, and Ben Bailey Smith.

=== Filming ===
Filming took place in Budapest in June and July 2024. Filming also took place in London. First-look images from filming were released in December 2024.

== Episodes ==
No.	Title	Directed by	Written by	Original release date	U.S. airdate
1	"The Perfect Mother"	Eva Sigurðardóttir	Ruth Fowler & Amanda Duke	22 May 2025	11 December 2025
2	"You Think You Know Someone"	Eva Sigurðardóttir	Ruth Fowler & Amanda Duke	22 May 2025	11 December 2025
3	"One of Them is Lying"	Eva Sigurðardóttir	Ruth Fowler & Amanda Duke	22 May 2025	11 December 2025
4	"Nowhere Safe"	Eva Sigurðardóttir	Ruth Fowler & Amanda Duke	22 May 2025	11 December 2025
5	"Unravelling"	Eva Sigurðardóttir	Ruth Fowler & Amanda Duke	22 May 2025	11 December 2025
6	"What Have You Done?"	Eva Sigurðardóttir	Ruth Fowler & Amanda Duke	22 May 2025	11 December 2025

== Release ==
The series was released in the United Kingdom and Ireland on Paramount+ on 22 May 2025. In the United States and all other markets, the series premiered on Paramount+ on 11 December 2025.
