= Emily Taaffe =

Irish actress

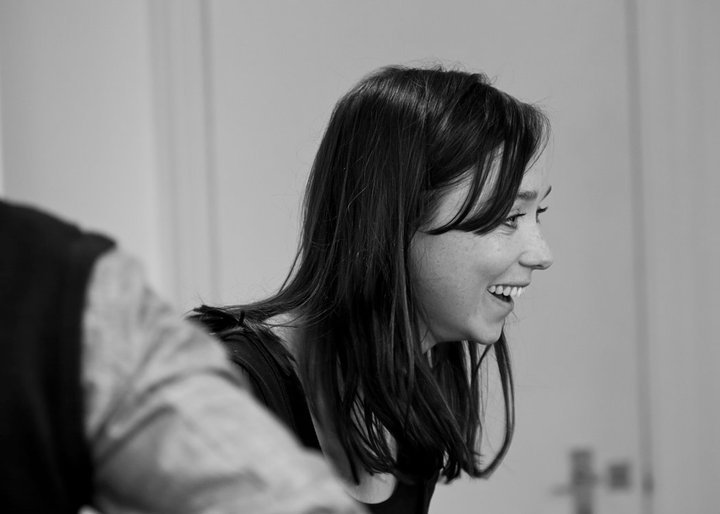
- Taaffe in 2012
- Born: Emily Anne Taaffe; 10 January 1984 (age 42); Skerries, County Dublin, Ireland
- Other name: Emily Anne Schiffer
- Education: Trinity College Dublin; London Academy of Music and Dramatic Art
- Occupation: Actress
- Years active: 2008–present
- Spouse: Ben Schiffer (m. 2016)
- Children: 1

Emily Anne Taaffe (/ˈtæf/ TAFF; born 10 January 1984; married name Emily Anne Schiffer) is an Irish actress based in South London. Her films include Beast (2017) and The Dig (2018). On television, she is known for her roles in the RTÉ One series Paula (2017), the Sky Atlantic series The Rising (2022) and the Channel 4 series Trespasses (2025).

== Early life and education ==
The youngest of five children, Emily was born to Noeleen and Eamonn Taaffe in Skerries, County Dublin, Ireland. The family moved when she was an infant to Tullyallen near Drogheda, County Louth where she lived until university. After receiving a First-Class Honours B.A. in 2005 from Trinity College Dublin, she was accepted to train at London Academy of Music and Dramatic Art (LAMDA) in London.

== Career ==
=== Theatre ===
Taaffe has starred in a number of theatrical productions across the UK and Ireland. Her credits include: Daphne in an adaptation of Terry Pratchett's Nation, Hannah Lambroke in Conor McPherson’s The Veil and Dunyasha in Howard Davies' production of The Cherry Orchard, all at the National Theatre, London. Taaffe played leading roles in The Comedy of Errors, The Tempest and Twelfth Night for The Royal Shakespeare Company in Stratford upon Avon and in London. Other credits include; The Crucible at Regent's Park Open Air Theatre, Three Sisters at both the Southwark Playhouse and the Abbey Theatre Dublin, The American Plan at The Theatre Royal Bath, The House of Special Purpose at Minerva Theatre, Chichester and Intemperance at the Liverpool Everyman Theatre.

=== Television ===
Having begun to expand into screen work, Taaffe had a role in the CBC series X Company, an emotionally driven character drama set in World War II, and in the Victorian era detective drama, Ripper Street. Additional TV credits include a role in the BBC's War and Peace, as well as guest roles in the BBC programmes New Tricks, Call the Midwife, Atlantis, Death in Paradise, and Informer. She has also appeared in ITV’s Vera and The Borgias. In 2025, she appeared in the Paramount production Little Disasters and the Channel 4 drama series Trespasses.

== Personal life ==
In summer 2016 she married British writer Ben Schiffer. The couple have a son.
