= A Child from the South =

- Written by: Chris Austen; Gill Bond; Leyga Zendare
- Directed by: Sergio Rezende
- Starring: Josette Simon; Alex Descas; Pete Postlethwaite
- Music by: David Tygel
- Country of origin: United Kingdom
- Original language: English

Production
- Producers: Aurelio Le Bon; Gavik Losey

Original release
- Release: 1991

A Child From the South was a 1991 television movie about a Nadia (played by Josette Simon), a young journalist, in political exile from South Africa since her father's assassination twenty years earlier and her return to cover a United Nations conference.

It was written by Chris Austin, Gill Bond and Leyga Zendare and directed by Sergio Rezende.
