= Ruth Fowler (writer) =

British writer

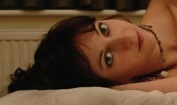
- Born: United Kingdom
- Occupations: Screenwriter; author; photographer; playwright; journalist

Ruth Fowler (aka Ruth Iorio) is a British-born Los Angeles and London based screenwriter, director and journalist, who first came to media attention after writing several articles for The Village Voice as "Mimi".

== Background ==
Fowler holds a first-class Honors Bachelor's degree in English Literature from King's College, Cambridge and a Master's degree in Film Production from the University of Southern California. After graduating Cambridge, Fowler traveled to over fifty countries working as a chef, a sailor, a bar-tender, a supermarket checkout girl and a waitress before finding herself in New York City. While attempting to obtain a work visa she worked at a stripclub in Manhattan, writing about her experiences on her blog .

== Career ==
As well as The Village Voice, she has written for The Guardian, The Observer, Wired, The New York Post, The Huffington Post, The Fix and The Norton Anthology For Creative Non Fiction. Her first book, No Man's Land, was published by Viking Penguin, and was republished as Girl Undressed.

Fowler's original political screenplay Fly Me ensured that Fowler was selected as a Screen International Stars of Tomorrow 2012, alongside previous winners Emily Blunt, Carey Mulligan, Robert Pattison and Andrew Garfield.

Rules of the Game, a BBC One thriller series that Fowler created and wrote, aired in 2022. It starred Maxine Peake as the executive of a sportswear business, who becomes embroiled in a police investigation about a dead employee. In a 2023 article for Fast Company, Fowler revealed she had had to take on part time work to support herself and her son, as money from studio work was inconsistent, meagre and tardy. In Wired, she wrote about her experiences working as an AI trainer for companies like Mercor. In 2025, Fowler was credited as the showrunner and lead writer on the Paramount+ series Little Disasters.

Fowler teaches screenwriting at UCLA.

== Personal life ==
Fowler was briefly married to the photographer Jared Iorio, and lived in Venice, California. In 2013, Fowler and her husband shared the experience of birthing her son at home via posts and pictures on social media. After, Fowler moved to an apartment in Inglewood, California.

Fowler is a staunch believer in universal free education.
