= Milk and Honey (film) =

- Directed by: Glen Salzman; Rebecca Yates
- Written by: Glen Salzman; Trevor Rhone
- Produced by: Peter O'Brian
- Starring: Josette Simon; Lyman Ward; Richard Mills; Djanet Sears; Leonie Forbes
- Cinematography: Guy Dufaux
- Edited by: Bruce Nyznik
- Music by: Maribeth Solomon; Micky Erbe
- Release date: September 9, 1988
- Running time: 89 minutes
- Country: Canada
- Language: English
- Budget: £1.3 million

Milk and Honey is a 1988 Canadian drama film. It stars Josette Simon as Joanna Bell, a young woman from Jamaica who takes a job in Toronto as a nanny for a wealthy couple (Tom Butler and Fiona Reid), in the hope of permanently immigrating to Canada with her son David (Richard Mills).

The cast also includes Lyman Ward, Djanet Sears, Leonie Forbes, Errol Slue, Charles Hyatt, Jackie Richardson, Robert Wisden and Diane D'Aquila. The film was written by Glen Salzman and Trevor Rhone, and directed by Salzman and Rebecca Yates.

The film premiered at the 1988 Toronto International Film Festival. Due to a creative conflict with producer Peter O'Brian, however, Salzman and Yates refused to attend the film's premiere, and released an open letter to the media stating that the finished film did not reflect their personal artistic vision.

== Awards ==
The film garnered four Genie Award nominations at the 10th Genie Awards in 1989:

- Best Actress: Josette Simon
- Best Original Screenplay: Trevor Rhone and Glen Salzman
- Best Original Score: Maribeth Solomon and Micky Erbe
- Best Original Song: Louise Bennett, "You're Going Home"

Rhone and Salzman won the award for Best Original Screenplay.
