= Anatomy of a Scandal =

American drama television miniseries

- Promotional poster
- Genre: Courtroom drama; Legal thriller; Political thriller; Psychological thriller
- Based on: Anatomy of a Scandal by Sarah Vaughan
- Developed by: David E. Kelley; Melissa James Gibson
- Directed by: S. J. Clarkson
- Starring: Sienna Miller; Michelle Dockery; Rupert Friend; Naomi Scott; Joshua McGuire; Josette Simon
- Music by: Johan Söderqvist
- Country of origin: United States
- Original language: English
- No. of episodes: 6

Production
- Executive producers: David E. Kelley; S. J. Clarkson; Melissa James Gibson; Liza Chasin; Bruna Papandrea; Allie Goss; Sarah Vaughan
- Producer: Mark Kinsella
- Cinematography: Balazs Bolygo
- Editors: Liana Del Giudice; Mary Finlay
- Running time: 43–48 minutes
- Production companies: David E. Kelley Productions; 3dot Productions; Made Up Stories; Endeavor Content; Anonymous Content

Original release
- Network: Netflix
- Release: April 15, 2022

Anatomy of a Scandal is an American thriller drama television miniseries developed by David E. Kelley and Melissa James Gibson, based on the novel of the same name by Sarah Vaughan. The series consists of six episodes, and premiered on Netflix on April 15, 2022.

== Premise ==
Sophie Whitehouse is the wife of British Home Secretary James Whitehouse. Sophie learns that her husband has been having an affair with his young aide, Olivia Lytton. The news goes public, blowing up their lives and forces Sophie to deal with the consequences of James' actions. To make matters worse, James is accused of raping Olivia and has to stand trial.

== Cast and characters ==
=== Main ===
- Sienna Miller as Sophie Whitehouse, James's wife
  - Hannah Dodd portrays a young Sophie Whitehouse (then: Sophie Greenaway)
- Michelle Dockery as Kate Woodcroft QC, prosecution counsel tasked with James's case
  - Nancy Farino portrays a young Kate Woodcroft, then named Holly Berry
- Rupert Friend as James Whitehouse MP, Home Office minister and close friend to the Prime Minister
  - Ben Radcliffe portrays a young James Whitehouse
- Naomi Scott as Olivia Lytton, parliamentary researcher on James's staff, who has an affair with him and later accuses him of rape
- Joshua McGuire as Chris Clarke, Downing Street communications chief
- Josette Simon as Angela Regan QC, James's defense counsel

=== Recurring ===
- Jonathan Firth as Richard, Kate's married former pupil master, with whom she is having an affair
- Sebastian Selwood as Finn Whitehouse, Sophie and James's son
- Amelie Bea Smith as Emily Whitehouse, Sophie and James's daughter
- Geoffrey Streatfeild as Tom Southern MP, the Prime Minister
  - Jake Simmance portrays a young Tom Southern
- Violet Verigo as Krystyna, the Whitehouses' Russian au pair
- Liz White as Ali, a schoolteacher and Kate's best friend
- Tom Turner as John Vestey, James's solicitor,
- Josette Simon as Angela Regan, James's defence barrister
- Jonathan Coy as Aled Luckhurst, the judge of James's rape case
- Kudzai Sitima as Maggie, Kate's pupil

=== Guest ===
- Richard McCabe as Brian Taylor
- Rosalie Craig as Lucy
- Anna Madeley as Ellie Frisk, a friend of Sophie's
- Edmund Kingsley as Mark Frisk, Ellie's husband
- Maggie Steed as Sybil Murray, one of James's constituents
- Luka Sheppard as Alec Fisher, a classmate of James and Tom at Oxford
- Jane How as Madame Speaker
- Clive Francis as Lawrence Hughes-Davies MP
- Adrian Lukis as Aitkin, Leader of the Opposition
- Kathryn Wilder as Kitty Ledger, Olivia's friend and co-worker
- Phoebe Nicholls as Tuppence Whitehouse, James's mother

== Episodes ==
No.	Title	Directed by	Written by	Original release date
1	"Episode 1"	S. J. Clarkson	Melissa James Gibson & David E. Kelley	April 15, 2022
Beautiful and wealthy Sophie Whitehouse is called away from a party by her husband, Tory MP James Whitehouse, who confesses he had a five-month affair with one of his aides, Olivia Lytton, and the news is about to break publicly. Although upset, Sophie decides without question to forgive her husband as they have been together since university and have two children together. Despite some uncomfortable press, James manages to de-escalate the news. Just as the story seems likely to blow over, two police officers approach James, informing him that Olivia has accused him of rape.
2	"Episode 2"	S. J. Clarkson	Melissa James Gibson	April 15, 2022
James is charged with rape, and a trial date is set. After being shut out from her social circle, Sophie reflects on her decisions to support James's career at her own expense. Sophie reluctantly attends James's trial, where Olivia is called on to give testimony and reveals that unlike the meaningless physical affair James claimed was happening, James respected Olivia's intelligence, and she was in love with him, prompting Sophie to leave the court in distress.
3	"Episode 3"	S. J. Clarkson	Melissa James Gibson	April 15, 2022
James's trial continues, as Olivia details her version of events surrounding the subject sexual encounter, which James concedes occurred while alleging Olivia's consent to the intercourse in his defence. Despite her extreme discomfort with the details, Sophie stays in court. James feels his defence lawyer adequately cross-examined Olivia's testimony but James and Sophie learn afterwards from Chris Clarke that a second woman has come forward claiming that James sexually assaulted a fellow student while at Oxford, a woman named Holly Berry, Sophie's first-year tutorial partner. The Prime Minister, Tom Southern, who has thus far stood beside James, faces a coup within his own party and threatens to cut James loose. James reminds him that Tom owes him. A flashback reveals that during a party, James helped Tom cover up the accidental death of their friend Alec Fisher, who fell from a rooftop after using heroin supplied to him by Tom.
4	"Episode 4"	S. J. Clarkson	Melissa James Gibson & David E. Kelley	April 15, 2022
Sophie takes the children to visit James's parents in the countryside. Olivia's friend Kitty Ledger takes the stand. Prosecuting counsel, Kate Woodcroft is off her game when questioning and later has a panic attack. Returning home, Sophie is deeply disturbed by the fact that James still has no memory of Holly. A flashback reveals that James raped Holly during his last week of university, with some of the event's details bearing a disturbing resemblance to Olivia's rape. Kate calls her mother, identifying herself as "Holly" and thereby revealing she is actually Holly Berry, now going by a different name.
5	"Episode 5"	S. J. Clarkson	Melissa James Gibson & David E. Kelley	April 15, 2022
James is called to give evidence and, on the stand, admits that he and Olivia were in love during their affair. During the trial, both Sophie and James seem to recognize Kate as Holly Berry separately; Sophie through Kate's distinct note-taking and James through Kate's line of questioning. Aware of who Kate is, James uses his testimony to deny he raped her in a way only Kate would recognize, but he loses control of his temper during the line of questioning. The trial shakes Sophie, and she later sneaks out to visit Kate in private.
6	"Episode 6"	S. J. Clarkson	Melissa James Gibson & David E. Kelley	April 15, 2022
Though Kate denies knowing Sophie, Sophie leaves their meeting convinced she is Holly Berry. When Sophie returns home, James reveals that the night he and Tom were involved in Alec's accidental death, he had sex with a woman who he believes could have been Holly Berry and further admits that Tom supplied drugs to Alec while James disposed of the evidence. The trial concludes, and James is acquitted. James privately admits to Sophie that he called Olivia a "prick-tease", a piece of evidence he denied in court. Sophie decides to leave James. She has a final meeting with Kate, where Kate says that James raped her, and Sophie reveals that she leaked James and Tom's involvement in Alec's death to the press. As a result of this latest escalation of the scandal, Tom is forced to resign as Prime Minister while police arrest James. Sophie and her children begin new lives in the country, and Kate continues to practice law as a prosecutor.

== Production ==
Logo

Netflix announced in May 2020 they had greenlit the series, which David E. Kelley and Melissa James Gibson adapted from the Sarah Vaughan novel of the same name. S. J. Clarkson was set to direct all episodes of the series. In September, Sienna Miller, Michelle Dockery, and Rupert Friend were cast to star in the series. Naomi Scott would be added in December, with Ben Radcliffe cast in a recurring role in January 2021.

Filming for the series began in October 2020 at Shepperton Studios. Filming also took place at St. George's Hanover Square Primary School in Mayfair, London. Production took place in Oxford in February 2021.

== Reception ==
The review aggregator website Rotten Tomatoes reported a 60% approval rating with an average rating of 5.9/10, based on 42 critic reviews. The website's critics consensus reads, "Anatomy of a Scandal has the bones of a good David E. Kelley potboiler but lacks the connective tissue to really work, although the starry cast provides an intrigue all its own." Metacritic, which uses a weighted average, assigned a score of 52 out of 100 based on 20 critics, indicating "mixed or average reviews". Anatomy of a Scandal was in the Netflix Global Top 10 of most-watched English language series for five weeks, holding the number one position in its second week.
