= Louise Page =

British playwright (1955–2020)

Louise Mary Page (7 March 1955 – 30 May 2020) was a British playwright.

== Life ==
Page was born on 7 March 1955 in London.

Page studied at University College Cardiff (now Cardiff University) and at the University of Birmingham. She was commissioned by the Birmingham Arts Lab, and was Yorkshire Television Fellow at Sheffield University. She was Royal literary Fellow at Leeds Trinity University 2003–04, Edge Hill University, and University of Huddersfield, 2007–2009.

Page was the first fellow to be placed at University of Huddersfield; she made a significant contribution to the academic development of many students, particularly in health and social care education, drawing on her personal experience of health and ill-health

Page's legacy was a well-established fellowship which has been continuous since. During her time at Huddersfield her play Salonika was produced at the Leeds Playhouse and she led a creative writing masterclass at the Huddersfield Literary Festival in 2008.

After Huddersfield she continued to collaborate with the Fellowship coordinator there to produce a Reflective Practice textbook, using a creative, narrative style.

With her husband, Christopher Hawes, Page ran Words4work.

Page died of cancer on 30 May 2020, aged 65.

== Awards ==
- 1977 International Student Playscript Award for Lucy.
- 1982 George Devine Award, for Salonika.
- 1985 J.T. Grein Award, by the Critics Circle

== Works ==
- Glasshouse, Edinburgh, 1977
- Want-Ad, Birmingham Rep, Birmingham, 1977
- Tissue, Belgrade Theatre, Coventry, 1978
- Hearing, Birmingham Rep, Birmingham, 1979
- Lucy, Old Vic, Bristol, 1979
- Flaws, Sheffield University Drama Studio, Sheffield, 1980
- House Wives, Derby, 1981
- Salonika, Royal Court Theatre Upstairs, London, 1982
- Falkland Sound/Voces De Malvinas, Royal Court Theatre, London, 1983
- Golden Girls Other Place, Stratford-upon-Avon, 1984
- Real Estate, Tricycle Theatre, London, 1984
- Beauty and the Beards, Old Vic Theatre, London, 1985
- Beauty and the Beast, Playhouse, Liverpool, 1985
- Goat, Croydon, 1986
- Diplomatic Wives, Watford Place Theatre, Hertford, 1989
- Adam Was A Gardener, Minerva Theatre, Chichester, 1991
- Hawks And Doves, Nuffield Theatre, Southampton, 1992
- Spare Parts, Studio Theatre, Sacramento, 1992
- Like To Live, New York, 1992
- Another Nine Months, New End Theatre, London, 1995
- The Statue of Liberty, Playhouse, Derby, 1997
