= Ros Asquith =

English cartoonist and author

- Born: Hove, Sussex, England
- Education: Camberwell School of Art (BA)
- Occupations: Cartoonist, children's author, illustrator and journalist
- Spouse: John Fordham
- Children: 2 sons
- Website: rosasquith.co.uk

Ros Asquith is an English cartoonist, children's author, illustrator and journalist. After an early career as a graphic designer and photographer, she worked in journalism in various roles mostly connected with theatre – including critic, reviewer, editor and diary writer – for Time Out magazine, City Limits, The Observer and TV Times, before becoming a cartoonist for The Guardian, where she has worked for more than 20 years. Known as an author for her bestselling Teenage Worrier series, Asquith has written more than 60 books for young people.

== Biography ==
Born in Hove, Sussex, Ros Asquith grew up in London. After studying graphics and illustration at Camberwell School of Art, where she earned a BA honours degree, she was employed in 1972 as a graphic designer with Inter-Action, and was the company's official photographer at the Almost Free Theatre. Her work in photography brought her commissions from The Observer, where she also began writing, and eventually became deputy theatre critic. She went on to do theatre listings then reviews for Time Out magazine, moving on to be theatre editor for City Limits (1981–90) and being a diary writer for TV Times. She later emerged as cartoonist for The Guardian, particularly known for her strip cartoon "Doris", which ran for more than a decade. Years after The Guardian ceased publishing the strip, Asquith contributed a new series of cartoons featuring Doris – a cleaning lady who "witnesses the divides of a society shaken by Brexit" – to UCL's European Institute.

While continuing to work as a cartoonist, Asquith is the author of more than 60 books for young people, particularly teenagers, her most popular series including Teenage Worrier, Fibby Libby, Girl Writer, Trixie and Letters from an Alien Schoolboy (the latter being shortlisted for the Roald Dahl Funny Book Prize), as well as numerous picture books, and she is known as an illustrator who “recognises and celebrates diversity in all its forms”. In a 2021 interview discussing her book My Mum the Handyman, Asquith said: "I try to subvert stereotypes, so if I'm asked to draw a judge, I'll always draw a woman. I try to show families that aren't always white, or the traditional nuclear set-up."

== Selected bibliography ==
=== Self-illustrated ===
- Baby!, Macdonald Optima, 1988.
- Toddler!, Pandora Press, 1989.
- I Was a Teenage Worrier, Piccadilly Press, 1989.
- Babies!, Pandora Press, 1990.
- Green!, Pandora Press, 1991.
- I Was a Teenage Worrier: Dilemma Handbook, Piccadilly Press, 1992.
- The Teenage Worrier's Guide to Lurve, Piccadilly Press, 1996.
- The Teenage Worrier's Christmas Survival Guide, Piccadilly Press, 1996.
- The Teenage Worrier's Guide to Life, Corgi, 1997.
- The Teenage Worrier's Pocket Guide to Romance, Corgi, 1998.
- The Teenage Worrier's Pocket Guide to Families, Corgi, 1998.
- The Teenage Worrier's Pocket Guide to Mind & Body, Corgi, 1998.
- The Teenage Worrier's Pocket Guide to Success, Corgi, 1998.
- The Teenage Worrier's Worry Files, Corgi, 1999.
- The Teenage Worrier's Panick Diary, Corgi, 2000.
- Letters from an Alien Schoolboy, Piccadilly Press, 2010.

=== Juvenile fiction ===
- Nora Normal and the Great Shark Rescue, Hodder Children's Books, 1996.
- Nora Normal and the Great Ghost Adventure, Hodder Children's Books, 1997.
- Bad Hair Days, Orchard Books, 1997.
- Keep Fat Class, Orchard Books, 1997.
- Unbridled Passion, Orchard Books, 1998.
- Make It Me, Orchard Books, 1998.
- Trixie Tempest and the Amazing Talking Dog, Collins, 2003.
- Trixie Tempest and the Ghost of St. Aubergine's, Collins, 2003.
- Drama Queen, Orchard Books, 2003.
- The Love Bug, Orchard Books, 2003.
- All for One, Orchard Books, 2003.
- Frock Shock, Orchard Books, 2003.
- Three's a Crowd, Orchard Books, 2003.
- Mrs. Pig's Night Out, illustrated by Selina Young, Hodder & Stoughton, 2003.
- Trixie Tempest's ABZ of Life, Collins, 2004.
