= Barry Kyle =

English theatre director

Barry Albert Kyle (born 25 March 1947) is an English theatre director, currently Honorary Associate Director of the Royal Shakespeare Company, England.

Kyle attended Beal Grammar School in Ilford and then studied drama and English at the University of Birmingham. He began his theatre career in 1969 at the Liverpool Playhouse where he directed 21 productions. In 1973 he became an assistant director at the Royal Shakespeare Company where he directed in the studio theatre called The Other Place a production of Sylvia Plath a Dramatic Portrait, his dramatisation of Sylvia Plath's poetry and life. This played at the Brooklyn Academy of Music in New York. In the Stratford main house he first directed Shakespeare's Measure for Measure with Michael Pennington, and then went on to direct many others including The Roaring Girl with Helen Mirren, The Taming of the Shrew with Sinead Cusack and Alun Armstrong, Love's Labour's Lost with Kenneth Branagh and Richard II with Jeremy Irons.

In 1986, he directed the first production at the RSC's new Swan Theatre: The Two Noble Kinsmen by William Shakespeare and John Fletcher, with Gerard Murphy, Hugh Quarshie and Imogen Stubbs, and served there as Artistic Director until 1991. He pioneered Marlowe's plays in The Swan with The Jew of Malta (1987) and Dr Faustus (1989) and staged rare works such as James Shirley's Hyde Park (1989) with Fiona Shaw and Alex Jennings. His other RSC productions include premiers of plays by Howard Brenton, Edward Bond, Howard Barker and Ron Hutchinson.

In 1983 and 1985, Kyle directed The Dillen for the RSC which was an immersive and peripatetic production with a cast of 250 about the epic life of a local man, George Hewins, which was staged on the streets and in the fields of Stratford. His work has been seen throughout the world including Berlin, Paris, Vienna, Melbourne, Singapore, Moscow and Prague. He was the first western director to be invited to the National Theatre in Prague (1991), where he directed King Lear in Czech. He also directed Shakespeare's The Merchant of Venice in Hebrew at the Cameri Theatre in Tel Aviv (1981).

In 1991 Kyle moved to the United States, founding the Swine Palace company in Louisiana, and building the Swine Palace theatre in Baton Rouge: a restoration of a derelict auction facility for livestock, retaining the earth floor of the original building. This opened in February 2000 with Kyle's production of A Midsummer Night's Dream. In the USA he also directed in New York (Henry V, off-Broadway, 1992 with Mark Rylance which won the Lucille Lortel award) and Measure for Measure (1997) and he also directed in Washington DC (Romeo and Juliet, The Shakespeare Theater, 1994, with Marin Hinkle). He later adapted and directed Shakespeare's Henry VI for Theatre For A New Audience in New York, which won a Drama Desk award for Most Outstanding Revival.

Kyle has been nominated in the Laurence Olivier Awards as Best Director for his RSC productions of The Taming of the Shrew and Love's Labour's Lost.

== Publications ==
- Sylvia Plath: A Dramatic Portrait Conceived and Adapted from Her Writings. Faber and Faber. 24 April 1976. ISBN 978-0-571-10698-1.
