= Comedy Firsts =

- Genre: Sitcom/Sketch
- Starring: Various
- Country of origin: United Kingdom
- No. of episodes: 6

Production
- Running time: 30 minutes

Original release
- Network: ITV
- Release: 10 July – 14 August 1995

Comedy Firsts is a British television series consisting of five unrelated sitcoms and one sketch show that aired in 1995. Two of the episodes later led to full series, Barbara and Sometime, Never.

== Background ==
Comedy Firsts followed on from ITV's Playhouse that had aired in 1993. It followed the same format of a series of one-off comedy pilots. Each episode of Comedy Firsts aired on Monday at 8pm and had a different cast and writers.

== Episodes ==
| Title | Airdate | Writers | Overview | IMDb link |
|---|---|---|---|---|
| Barbara | 10 July | Mark Bussell, Rob Clark, Ramsay Gilderdale & Graham Mark Walker | Barbara Liversage (played by Gwen Taylor) is a no-nonsense nosey Yorkshire woman who works at a doctor's receptionist with a sharp tongue. She is married to Ted (Sam Kelly), a taxi driver. Her son Neil (Benedict Sandiford) still lives at home, while her daughter Linda (Caroline Milmoe) is married to chef Martin Benson (Glen Davies). Barbara's sister is Jean (Shirley Anne Field) who is married to Phil (John Arthur) while her colleague is Doreen (Madge Hindle). Three series of Barbara aired from 1999 to 2003. | |
| Sometime, Never | 17 July | Jenny Lecoat | Maxine Bailey (played by Sara Crowe) is a single, acid-tongued liberal drama teacher at an inner-city comprehensive. On her 31st birthday she reflects on her life, and annoyed that fellow teacher Louise Kilgarith (Lucinda Fisher) got a promotion she wanted and generally annoyed with her ex-boyfriend Ian (Harry Burton). Her best friend Bernice (Ann Bryson) lives in the flat above her. Also starring Saeed Jaffrey as headteacher Harry and Sean Carnegie as Jason Williams. One series of Sometime, Never aired in 1996. | |
| Sardines | 24 July | Gareth Edwards, Chris Langham & Ben Miller | Davy Kotowski (played by Griff Rhys Jones) is a petty officer aboard submarine HMS Wolverine. Following a rigged arm-wrestling contest, half the crew are in slings. Kotowski is then brought before the Captain, Alec McCleod (John Docherty) for the ninth time. He is sentenced to denial of shore leave and 20 hours laundry duty, most of which he delegates to the simple sailor Chris Cheese (William Ivory). Kotowski then plots his revenge on Lionel Pinner (Ian Bartholomew) and Cheese ends up having a £100 grudge darts match with Pinner on Kotowski's behalf. Also starring Anthony Smee as Roger Tench, Paul Shearer as Proudlove, Peter-Hugo Daly as Galloway, Perry Benson as Coxswain, Ben Miller as Simon Adair, Alexander Armstrong as Alastair Simpson and Jake Abraham as Mickey Davis. | |
| Waiting | 31 July | Jim Hitchmough | The NHS Hillcroft Medical Centre has a vacancy for a practise manager. The receptionist Beryl Oldham (played by Brigit Forsyth) is the favourite for the job, but then pompous ex-Army officer Maurice Ribley (Patrick Barlow) arrives and he is given the job. Also starring Peter Jones as Dr. Roger Capstick, Ashley Jensen as Amanda Cookson, Simon Slater as Dr. Duncan Pettifer and Sarah Lam as Dr. Anna Chen. | |
| The Smiths | 7 August | Julian Roach | Clive (played by Kevin McNally) and Carol Smith (Rebecca Lacey) are a Merseyside couple who are struggling to raise their two teenage children, Wayne (Scott Neal) and Debbie (Heather Jones) in a small semi-detached house. The walls are so thin Clive and Carol have to make love in their car, but when the car needs repairs they have to go without for a few weeks. When Clive and his friend Geoff (Rowland Rivron) fix the car, it is sold while they are down the pub. Also starring Jackie Downey as Linda, Sonia as Doona, Geoffrey Hughes as Dooley and Angus Lennie as Wilf. | |
| Now What | 14 August | Various | A sketch show starring Fiona Allen, Don Gilet, Alan D. Marriott, Curtis Walker and Angela Wynter. It included a character called Triviaman and a spoof of Casualty called Casually. | |
