= Birds of a Feather (TV series) =

British television sitcom (1989–1998, 2014–2020)

- Title card
- Genre: Sitcom
- Created by: Laurence Marks; Maurice Gran
- Directed by: Nick Wood
- Starring: Pauline Quirke; Linda Robson; Lesley Joseph
- Theme music composer: Irving Berlin
- Opening theme: "What'll I Do" performed by Linda Robson & Pauline Quirke
- Ending theme: "What'll I Do?"
- Country of origin: United Kingdom
- Original language: English
- No. of series: 12
- No. of episodes: 129 (list of episodes)

Production
- Executive producers: Allan McKeown; Jon Rolph; Steve Sheen
- Producer: Jo Willett
- Camera setup: Video (1989–1998); Multiple-camera setup (2014–2020)
- Running time: 30–75 minutes (1989–1998); 22–45 minutes (2014–2020)
- Production companies: Alomo Productions (1989–1998); Hare and Tortoise / Quirkymedia Stuff (2014–2020)

Original release
- Network: BBC One
- Release: 16 October 1989 – 24 December 1998
- Network: ITV
- Release: 2 January 2014 – 24 December 2020

Birds of a Feather is a British sitcom originally broadcast on BBC One from 16 October 1989 to 24 December 1998, then revived on ITV from 2 January 2014 to 24 December 2020. The series stars Pauline Quirke and Linda Robson, with Lesley Joseph. It was created by Laurence Marks and Maurice Gran, who also wrote many of the episodes.

In the first episode, sisters Sharon and Tracey are brought together when their husbands are sent to prison for armed robbery. Sharon, who lives in an Edmonton council flat, moves into Tracey's upmarket house in Chigwell, Essex. Their next-door neighbour and later friend Dorien is a middle-aged married Jewish woman who is constantly having affairs with younger men. In the last two BBC series, the location is changed to nearby Hainault, London, before returning to Chigwell in series 10 (the first aired on ITV).

The series' original run ended on 24 December 1998 after nine years, and returned just over 15 years later, on 2 January 2014 (this time on ITV) for a tenth series. The opening episode of the new series attracted almost eight million viewers, giving ITV its highest-rated comedy since Barbara in 2000. A further two series were broadcast, followed by two Christmas specials. There was a further Christmas special in 2020, in which Pauline Quirke did not appear due to her decision to take a step back from acting, in order to focus on her performing arts academy.

== Synopsis ==
=== Title ===
The title comes from the idiom "birds of a feather flock together", meaning that people having similar characters, backgrounds, interests or beliefs will congregate.

=== Tracey Stubbs and Sharon Theodopolopodous ===
For Cockney sisters Sharon Theodopolopodous and Tracey Stubbs, life is never the same again when their husbands are convicted of armed robbery and sent to prison. Sharon, a common, fun-loving, large and loud-mouthed character from a council flat in Edmonton, moves into her sister's luxury home in Chigwell, so that she can support Tracey, after her husband's imprisonment.

Sharon always felt inadequate next to her elder sister, and felt she had the tougher childhood. Her marriage to Chris, a waster of Greek Cypriot descent, was miserable and childless, supposedly due to Sharon's infertility. Chris's family condemn her for this, but Sharon discovers that Chris is actually the infertile one. Sharon happily cheats on Chris and gives him grief when visiting. Despite this, she becomes bitterly envious whenever he has another woman and only ever makes half-hearted attempts to divorce him until the first ITV series in 2014, in which Chris finally demands a divorce from Sharon so he can marry again. Tracey, however, loves her husband, Darryl. His legitimate business was building conservatories, but he made most of his money by robbing banks. Unlike Sharon, who is more realistic about their husbands, Tracey deludes herself into believing her husband is innocent, especially in the 1994 Christmas episode "The Chigwell Connection" and when Darryl is finally released in series seven, she trusts him when he asks for a cheque on the company account, which leads to Darryl defrauding her out of her business assets. He and Tracey have a son, Garth, who becomes a chef after going to boarding school and eventually marries Kimberley. This marriage does not last; in series 10, Garth has moved to Australia and started a relationship with a girl named Marcie. Tracey is the more honest and law-abiding of the two sisters, whereas Sharon is more willing to indulge in unscrupulous and often criminal activities, such as illegally subletting her council flat when she was living with Tracey, taking drugs, selling stolen merchandise, fiddling her VAT and claiming unemployment benefit while she was actually employed.

=== Dorien Green ===
The sisters' neighbour is the wealthy, snobbish, man-eating Dorien Green, a middle-aged woman who strives to create the impression that she is a glamorous beauty, dressing in a sexually provocative style, preferring mini-skirts, high heels and leopard print. She is played by Lesley Joseph. Dorien is married to Marcus, but is frequently involved with other men, with hilarious consequences.

=== Released from prison ===
In the series 7 episode "Cheers", Darryl and Chris are released from prison and are determined to start afresh. Chris feels remorse for his crimes and not treating Sharon better during their marriage. He impresses Sharon by getting an honest job as a pizza delivery man. Darryl, however, feels that the only way to give Tracey the lifestyle he feels she deserves is to return to crime. He attempts to launder counterfeit money into Sharon and Tracey's swimming pool business but is caught and imprisoned again (at HMP Slade, an in-joke reference to Porridge) – along with an innocent Chris, much to Sharon's dismay. Darryl and Tracey's marriage is severely strained by this and Tracey contemplates leaving Darryl; she decides not to, but tells him that she will not be waiting for him, like she did when he was imprisoned before. In series 9, Tracey discovers she is pregnant and panics that Darryl may not be the father until she learns the other man had a vasectomy. When Tracey gives birth to her second child, Travis, Sharon vows to stand by her sister and raise the child with her.

Sharon and Tracey's maternal aunt, "Auntie Sylvie" (Vivian Pickles), is frequently mentioned and appears twice. After Tracey's and Sharon's parents died, Sylvie raised them. The character is later killed off.

=== Revival ===
In the tenth series it is revealed that Tracey and Darryl have divorced and that Darryl moved to Wales on his release from prison. Tracey has remarried and is back living in her former marital home, "Dalentrace", in Chigwell, kicking Sharon out due to her dislike of Tracey's second husband, Ralph. At the start of the series, Sharon is back in her council flat and the two have not spoken for more than six months when they "bump into each other" at a book signing. They are shocked to discover that the author of "Sixty Shades of Green" (a Fifty Shades of Grey clone) is their old friend Dorien. When Tracey offers Sharon a lift home, she confesses that she has thrown Ralph out after catching him stealing from her. Lonely, she persuades Sharon to move back in with her. Travis feigns annoyance that Sharon is back, but it is then revealed that he set up their "chance" meeting at the book signing.

As the three plan how their new set-up will work, Dorien arrives unexpectedly, after learning that she is being sued for plagiarising Fifty Shades of Grey. With all her assets frozen, she has no choice but to beg Tracey for a place to stay. Just as everyone is speculating how they will all fit into the house, Garth arrives with new girlfriend Marcie and her daughter, Poppy. By the end of the series Garth, Marcie and Poppy have moved out, with the couple opening a pop-up restaurant, and the case against Dorien has collapsed, due to a tabloid exposé about an MP she once dated – which proves the stories in her book were true. However, after initially planning to return to her former home in Hollywood, Dorien realises that Sharon and Tracey are her true friends and opts to stay with them.

In series 11, Garth comes home, having separated from Marcie. Dorien's past comes back to haunt her when, amongst her fan mail, she finds a letter from the daughter she gave up for adoption. Dorien eventually agrees to meet Naomi (Frances Ruffelle), who she is stunned to discover is a vicar with two grown-up children. Meanwhile, Tracey is faced with health concerns when she discovers a large mole on her shoulder is malignant.

In series 12, the police tell Tracey that Darryl died in an attempted robbery and that Garth is next of kin. The funeral is attended by Tracey, Sharon, Dorien, Garth, Travis and many of Darryl's gangster friends. Dorien is also revealed to have a granddaughter named Emma (Naomi's daughter), who briefly moves into the Stubbs house.

== Production ==
In the original series, most of the interior scenes were shot at Teddington Studios. The exterior filming location for 'Dalentrace' was on Camp Road, in the Gerrards Cross area of Buckinghamshire. Streets in the North West London suburb of Pinner frequently doubled for Chigwell, the series' setting. In the original series, the prison exteriors were filmed at HM Prison Maidstone.

For the 2014 revived series, interior scenes were recorded in Studio 2 at The London Studios. Filming took place in front of an audience between 28 September and 24 November 2013. The show moved to Pinewood Studios for the second revived series of the show. Filming for this series took place in front of an audience between 8 October and 26 November 2014. The show returned in January 2016 and was recorded at Pinewood Studios from 2 September until 21 October 2015, again in front of a live audience in the studio.

=== Revival ===
On 3 March 2009, the Daily Mirror reported that the sitcom was set for a return and that Lesley Joseph, Pauline Quirke and Linda Robson had all been asked to make another series. Quirke was reported as saying that her acting school "Quirky Kidz" was really beginning to take off, so she would be hesitant about becoming involved in another creative project. After this speculation in 2009 nothing more was said. However, in July 2012 Joseph hinted that Birds of a Feather could return for another series following a successful stage tour.

In March 2013, Quirke appeared on ITV's This Morning and confirmed that a script for a new series was "on the desk at the BBC" and they were just waiting for a decision on whether or not the BBC would commission a new series. The BBC offered to broadcast a one-off special episode, but this was refused by the producers of the show in favour of ITV's offer of a series. Fifteen years after the original series ended, the original cast returned, this time on ITV.

Robson confirmed on her Twitter account that filming began on 16 September 2013, with eight new episodes broadcasting from 2 January 2014. It was also confirmed that all characters would return, including Tracey's new child, who was born in the last episode (of the previous series, 16 years earlier). Matt Willis replaced Matthew Savage in the part of Garth (Garfie), making him the third actor to play the character; Willis was later replaced by Samuel James in 2015. Two new characters were introduced in the tenth series, including Garth's new girlfriend Marcie, who did not appear in the 2015 series. The first episode had mainly positive reviews, with fans saying the show had stayed true to itself. Quirke said that the cast returned with the intention of doing only one series, but she would not rule out doing further episodes if the scripts were right and the fans and viewers wanted more of the series. The opening episode attracted nearly eight million viewers, giving ITV its highest rated comedy since Barbara in 2000. On 16 January, Robson, Quirke and Joseph appeared on Loose Women to take over for one special episode to celebrate the series' return and the ratings success. Robson had been a regular panellist on Loose Women since 2012.

In March 2014, ITV announced that a second series of eight episodes would be produced. In August 2014, Robson confirmed that filming would start on 7 September 2014 and continue until November, and the series would be broadcast in January 2015. In November 2014, Robson confirmed that Willis would not return due to his commitments with McBusted. The role of Garth Stubbs was taken over by former EastEnders actor Samuel James. The series began airing on 26 December 2014, with a Christmas special and continued the following week (1 January 2015).

On 12 March 2015, ITV announced that a third series (the twelfth overall) was to be filmed later in the year. The series aired in January and February 2016. On 13 July 2016, ITV announced that Birds of a Feather would return to the channel for a 45-minute Christmas special, which was filmed in Malta. The episode aired on 24 December 2016.

Another Christmas special aired on 18 December 2017. In June 2018 Lesley Joseph revealed that ITV were discussing plans for another series in October 2019 to mark the show's 30th anniversary. However, Joseph said she did not yet wish to take part, owing to other work commitments. Confusion occurred in February 2019 when Nigel Lythgoe seemed to suggest the series had ended. An ITV representative later confirmed this story was false, the show had not been 'axed' and a Christmas special would air in December 2020.

A further Christmas special was broadcast on 24 December 2020 on ITV. The episode featured Linda Robson, Lesley Joseph and Les Dennis with a storyline inspired by the ongoing COVID-19 pandemic. This was the first episode in the show's history that did not feature Pauline Quirke.

On 16 May 2021, ITV announced that there were no plans for further episodes and it would not be commissioned for another series. In June 2022, Linda Robson stated that a further reunion special had been discussed with Pauline Quirke and that it was up to ITV to make a decision, but it was later revealed that Quirke had already received a dementia diagnosis in 2021, leading to her retiring from all work.

=== Birds of a Feather – 30 Years of Laughter ===
In June 2023, Channel 5 aired a 67-minute special retrospective for their "Comedy Classics" series. Cast, crew and celebrities discuss and pay tribute to the show. The documentary features interviews with Linda Robson and Lesley Joseph. The show is narrated by Stephen Mangan.

== Cast and characters ==
Key
= Main
= Recurring
= Guest

Actor	Character	Series												Episodes
Actor	Character	1	2	3	4	5	6	7	8	9	10	11	12	Episodes
Pauline Quirke	Sharon Theodopolopodous	✓	✓	✓	✓	✓	✓	✓	✓	✓	✓	✓	✓	128
Linda Robson	Tracey Stubbs	✓	✓	✓	✓	✓	✓	✓	✓	✓	✓	✓	✓	129
Lesley Joseph	Dorien Green	✓	✓	✓	✓	✓	✓	✓	✓	✓	✓	✓	✓	129
Alun Lewis	Darryl Stubbs	✓	✓	✓	✓	✓	✓	✘	✘	✘	✘	✘	✘	50
Douglas McFerran	Darryl Stubbs	✘	✘	✘	✘	✘	✘	✓	✘	✘	✘	✘	✘	5
David Cardy	Chris Theodopolopodous	✓	✘	✘	✘	✘	✘	✓	✓	✘	✓	✘	✘	10
Peter Polycarpou	Chris Theodopolopodous	✘	✓	✓	✓	✓	✓	✘	✘	✘	✘	✘	✘	39
Simon Nash	Garth Stubbs	✓	✘	✘	✘	✘	✘	✘	✘	✘	✘	✘	✘	1
Matthew Savage	Garth Stubbs	✘	✓	✓	✓	✓	✓	✓	✓	✓	✘	✘	✘	32
Matt Willis	Garth Stubbs	✘	✘	✘	✘	✘	✘	✘	✘	✘	✓	✘	✘	7
Samuel James	Garth Stubbs	✘	✘	✘	✘	✘	✘	✘	✘	✘	✘	✓	✓	14
Nickolas Grace	Marcus Green	✓	✘	✘	✘	✓	✘	✓	✘	✘	✘	✘	✘	3
Stephen Greif	Marcus Green	✘	✓	✘	✘	✘	✘	✘	✘	✘	✘	✘	✘	1
Stephen Marcus	Dave	✓	✘	✓	✘	✘	✘	✘	✘	✘	✘	✘	✘	3
Vivian Pickles	Aunt Sylvie	✘	✓	✘	✓	✘	✘	✘	✘	✘	✘	✘	✘	2
Jan Goodman	Melanie Fishman	✘	✘	✘	✓	✓	✘	✘	✓	✘	✘	✓	✘	5
Eamonn Walker	Colin	✘	✘	✘	✘	✓	✘	✘	✘	✘	✘	✘	✘	3
Bernard Holley	Richard	✘	✘	✘	✘	✘	✘	✘	✓	✓	✘	✘	✘	4
Charlie Quirke	Travis Stubbs	✘	✘	✘	✘	✘	✘	✘	✘	✘	✓	✓	✓	26
Camilla Beeput	Marcie	✘	✘	✘	✘	✘	✘	✘	✘	✘	✓	✘	✘	6
Jamie Foreman	Lenny	✘	✘	✘	✘	✘	✘	✘	✘	✘	✓	✘	✓	3
Kate Williams	Aunt Vera	✘	✘	✘	✘	✘	✘	✘	✘	✘	✘	✓	✓	3

| Rebecca Melanie Wood || Chav in shop || align="center"|✘ || align="center"|✘ || align="center"|✘ || align="center"|✘ || align="center"|✘ || align="center"|✘ || align="center"|✘ || align="center"|✘ || align="center"|✘ || align="center"|✘ || style="background: #DEF; color:black; vertical-align: middle; text-align: center; " class="table-cast"|✓ || style="background: #FFE3E3; color:black; vertical-align: middle; text-align: center; " class="table-cast"| ✘ || 1 |}

Notes: The 1996 episode "The Chigwell Years" included clips from previous episodes. Alun Lewis, Peter Polycarpou and David Cardy all featured in the archive footage but did not appear in any new scenes.

Linda Robson and Lesley Joseph were the only two leading cast members to appear in all 129 episodes, as Pauline Quirke appeared in all but the 2020 Christmas special.

=== Guest appearances ===
A large number of actors and personalities have made appearances, including David Emanuel, Jenny Seagrove, Michael Winner, Robert Kilroy Silk, Jill Halfpenny, Siobhan Hayes, Ross Kemp, Linda Henry, Alan Ford, Ray Winstone, George Hamilton, George Wendt, Brian Capron, Jamie Glover, Richard Branson, Lionel Blair, Robert Llewellyn, Liz Fraser, John Bardon, Clive Mantle, James Greene, Sophia La Porta, Amy Childs, Ted Robbins, Anna Skellern, Judy Cornwell, Lorraine Kelly, Katy Cavanagh, Martin Kemp, Lucy Dixon, Mark Kingston, Les Dennis, Curtis Walker and Paul Shearer.

== Episodes ==
Birds of a Feather first aired in 1989 and ran for 129 episodes consisting of 12 series and numerous specials. More than one hundred of the episodes are thirty minutes in length.

Most episodes were written by Laurence Marks and Maurice Gran. Gary Lawson, John Phelps, Geoff Rowley, Sue Teddern, Peter Tilbury, Geoff Deane, Tony Millan, Mike Walling, Damon Rochefort, Sam Lawrence, Keith Lindsay, Martin Tomms, Steve Coombes, Dave Robinson, George Costigan, Julia North, John Ross, Frankie Bailey, Miles Tredinnick, Jenny Lecoat, Alun Lewis, Richard Preddy, Gary Howe, Ian Davidson, Peter Vincent and Susan Nickson have also written episodes.

=== Opening titles ===
The theme tune was Irving Berlin's "What'll I Do?". Initially the version recorded by actor William Atherton for the 1974 film The Great Gatsby was used; from the third series, it is sung by Quirke and Robson.

==== Series 1 ====
During the opening theme for series 1, Quirke and Robson were seen both dressed in a white shirt and a black skirt and they walked towards to screen through several spotlights. Once they reached the screen it faded to Quirke and Robson sat back to back as they rotated. The ending theme was an extended version sung by Quirke and Robson together. It showed Quirke and Robson walking to the screen and back, passing through the spot lights, while the credits rolled on the left of the screen.

==== Series 2 ====
Opening credits from series two to nine (1990–98)

Series 2 featured the same music as series 1 but introduced the new opening which featured pictures of characters Sharon and Tracey as they grow up.

1. Sharon and Tracey as babies, could be toddlers.
2. As young children (this stage of their lives is featured in the closing theme)
3. As children, grown up
4. As teenager (from this picture, it is actually Quirke and Robson that feature in the pictures)
5. As young adults
6. As adults on Tracey's wedding day (from this picture, the pictures are in colour)
7. As adults on Sharon's wedding day
8. As adults, now as they appear in the series

For the picture transition, the pictures faded. The last picture remained until the entire screen faded into the episode.

For the closing theme, a video of the child actors that are supposed to be a young Sharon and Tracey is used: the second picture of the opening theme, out in a park eating ice creams with their teddies, chasing each other, Tracey trying to get Sharon to play, Sharon jumping down some steps, Tracey looking through a railing to a pond, and Sharon and Tracey waving bye and running away from the screen together.

==== Series 3–9 ====
Series 3 introduced a revised version of the song, which was performed by Quirke and Robson. In the opening theme, Robson sang the first verse and Quirke sang the last; this was the opposite way round in the closing theme. It used the same video as the series 2 opening and closing theme.

The episode closing theme was an extended version of the song. Quirke and Robson sang separate verses before singing the last line together: "That won't come true; what'll I do?".

==== Series 10 – 2017 Christmas Special ====
A new arrangement of the theme by Dave Arch accompanies a new title sequence using a number of the images used in the previous series titles as well as a current image of the sisters and Dorien – now styled to be pictures in frames, slides and images through a camera's view screen. The video sequence from the original closing credits now appears in the opening sequence alongside a clip from an old episode made to look like a home video recording. More of the old end credits video appears as the programme moves in and out of the commercial break. It was confirmed prior to broadcast in an online interview with Whatsontv that the opening titles have been slightly updated with new images and with Joseph now singing in the opening titles alongside Quirke and Robson.

==== 2020 Christmas Special ====
The previous arrangement of the theme tune is used, but since Quirke did not appear in this episode, only Robson's lines are sung, resulting in a truncated version of the theme tune. The titles do not feature the images of Sharon and Tracey; instead, a dark blue background shows the programme title and the writers, with credits for Linda Robson and Lesley Joseph only. The old video of Sharon and Tracey does not appear when the programme moves in and out of the commercial break.

== International broadcast and adaptations ==
Birds of a Feather was sold to more than 30 countries worldwide and the format was sold to countries including Australia (ABC TV), New Zealand (TVNZ), Spain and South Africa. The show is regularly re-run on Australian & New Zealand pay TV.

=== American adaptation ===
An American adaptation, called Stand by Your Man, was made by Fox. Rosie O'Donnell played hard-up Lorraine Popowski, while Melissa Gilbert-Brinkman played her rich sister Rochelle Dunphy. Sam McMurray played Rochelle's husband Roger, and Rick Hall played Lorraine's husband Artie. The Dorien character, called Adrienne Stone, was played by Miriam Flynn. The series was broadcast for only eight episodes from 5 April to 9 August 1992.

=== Stage adaptation ===
On 8 July 2010, Linda Robson confirmed on This Morning that a script had been written for a stage show, which all three actresses were keen to be involved with, but this would depend on the availability of Pauline Quirke, who had just been contracted to Emmerdale for six months. Quirke announced on 16 May 2011 that she would be leaving Emmerdale at Christmas 2011 and that a touring version of Birds of a Feather would start in spring 2012.

Birds of a Feather has been adapted for stage by The Comedy Theatre Company, producers of previous dinnerladies and Keeping Up Appearances UK stage tours. The 2012 Birds of a Feather UK tour includes the original three leading actresses. Quirke and Robson's real-life sons, Charlie Quirke and Louis Dunford, share the role of Travis Stubbs, the son born to Tracey in the final episode of the original BBC TV series.

== Reception ==
Birds of a Feather contributed to the popularity during the 1990s of Essex girl jokes.

=== Ratings ===
Series	Timeslot (UK)	Ep	First aired		Last aired		Avg. viewers (millions)
Series	Timeslot (UK)	Ep	Date	Viewers (millions)	Date	Viewers (millions)	Avg. viewers (millions)
1	Monday 8:30 pm	6th	16 October 1989	12.02	20 November 1989	12.52	12.53
2	Thursday 8:30 pm	15th	6 September 1990	8.51	13 December 1990	12.68	11.71
3	Saturday 8:00 pm (1–2) • 7:30 pm (3) • 8:05 pm (4–12)	12th	31 August 1991	9.69	16 November 1991	14.36	11.73
4	Sunday 8:40 pm	13th	6 September 1992	12.33	29 November 1992	12.25	11.91
5	Sunday 8:20 pm	13th	5 September 1993	13.76	28 November 1993	11.67	12.09
6	Sunday 7:30 pm (1–2) • 7:50 pm (3) • 8:00 pm (4) • 8:30 pm (5–13)	13th	18 September 1994	8.74	18 December 1994	11.14	9.93
7	Monday 9:30 pm	10th	26 May 1997	9.85	28 July 1997	6.74	8.07
8	Monday 8:30 pm	6th	5 January 1998	11.31	9 February 1998	12.14	12.10
9	Monday 8:30 pm	5th	16 November 1998	11.89	14 December 1998	11.73	11.53
10	Thursday 8:30 pm	8th	2 January 2014	9.51	6 March 2014	5.32	6.93
11	Thursday 8:30 pm	7th	1 January 2015	4.91	12 February 2015	4.12	4.33
12	Thursday 8:30 pm	8th	7 January 2016	5.34	25 February 2016	4.39	5.02

=== Awards ===
Year	Award Show	Category	Result	Recipient(s)	Ref(s)
1990	British Comedy Awards	Best TV Comedy Newcomer	Nominated	Linda Robson	
1990	British Comedy Awards	Best TV Comedy Newcomer	Won	Pauline Quirke	
1990	British Comedy Awards	Best TV Comedy Actress	Nominated	Pauline Quirke	
1991	TRIC Awards	TV Sitcom of the Year	Won	Birds of a Feather	
1993	TRIC Awards	TV Sitcom of the Year	Won	Birds of a Feather	
1993	BAFTA Awards	Best Comedy (Programme or Series)	Nominated	Birds of a Feather (Note: BAFTA Award nomination — Terry Kinane, Laurence Marks, Maurice Gran and Candida Julian-Jones)	
1997	National Television Awards	Most Popular Comedy Programme	Nominated	Birds of a Feather	
1997	National Television Awards	Most Popular Comedy Performer	Nominated	Pauline Quirke	
1998	National Television Awards	Most Popular Actress	Nominated	Pauline Quirke	
1998	TV Quick Awards	Best Actress	Won	Pauline Quirke	
1999	National Television Awards	Most Popular Comedy Performer	Nominated	Pauline Quirke	
1999	National Television Awards	Most Popular Comedy Programme	Nominated	Birds of a Feather	
1999	TV Quick Awards	Best Sitcom	Won	Birds of a Feather	
2014	Freesat UK Awards	Best TV Sitcom	Nominated	Birds of a Feather	
2015	TV Choice Awards	Most Popular Comedy	Nominated	Birds of a Feather	
2016	National Television Awards	Most Popular Comedy	Nominated	Birds of a Feather	
2016	TV Choice Awards	Best Comedy	Won	Birds of a Feather	

== Home media ==
=== Audio releases ===
On 27 July 2000, Two audio books were released featuring 8 classic shows from the first 2 series. The shows included were "Nicked", "Just Visiting", "Shift", "Women's Trouble", "Getting a Grip", "Sweet Smell of Success", "Young Guns" and "Muesli".

=== VHS ===
While the series was airing on BBC1 in the 1990s, there was VHS releases of episodes from the series.

VHS video title	Released	Episodes	BBFC rating
"Birds of a Feather – Part 1 – Episodes 1–3"	1990	Nicked, Just Visiting, Shift	PG
"Birds of a Feather – Part 2 – Episodes 4–6"	1990	Women's Troubles, Cheat!, Substitute	PG
"Birds of a Feather – Poetic Justice"	13 September 1993	Keeping Up Appearances, Baby Come Back, Poetic Justice, Okey-Cokey Karaoke	PG
"Birds of a Feather – Caring"	13 September 1993	Nine and a Half Days, Wipe That Smile Off Your Tape, Muesli	PG
"Birds of a Feather – Favour of the Month"	13 September 1993	Favour of the Month, Time and Tide, Belongings	PG
"Birds of a Feather – Sweet Smell of Success"	13 September 1993	Sweet Smell of Success, Parting, Keep off the Grass, Tinker Tailor	PG
"Birds of a Feather – The Very Best Of"	1 May 1995	Now Starter, Find The Lady, Moving, Still Waters Run Deep	PG

=== DVD ===
==== Region 2 ====
The first series of Birds of a Feather was released by Prism Leisure Corporation in 2003 on Region 2 DVD, which was again released by FremantleMedia in 2009. Distribution rights to the series are currently held by Network, who began releasing from the first series in 2010. A set containing all BBC series was released in 2011.

The first two ITV series (Series 10 & 11) were released via FremantleMedia onto Region 2 DVD in 2014 & 2015, both individually and in a box set. Network released the third ITV series (Series 12), a box set consisting of all three ITV series and a complete collection set containing all 12 series plus the Christmas specials up to and including the 2016 special. Additionally, a set with BBC and ITV Christmas specials were made available by Network in 2017, but again only containing the Christmas specials up to and including the 2016 special.

==== Region 4 ====
Series One was released in 2007 on Region 4 DVD; after which, three collected sets, consisting of Series 1–3, Series 4–6, and Series 7–9 were made available between 2011 and 2012. A set containing all BBC series was released in both UK and Australia in 2011 and 2012 respectively.

The three ITV series are available on Region 4 DVD in individual sets and as a complete box set.

==== Later Christmas Specials ====
The 2017 Christmas special was made available via Amazon Prime. As of 2025, the 2020 Christmas special is only available on the 2022 Australian DVD set detailed below.

=== DVD releases ===
DVD title	Release date		Features
DVD title	Region 2	Region 4	Features
BBC
Series 1	6 January 2003	11 April 2007	Prism Leisure Corporation; 6 episodes; 1 disc; BBFC: PG; ACB: PG
Series One (reissue)	1 June 2009	—N/a	FremantleMedia; 6 episodes; 1 disc; BBFC: PG
The Complete First Series (reissue)	30 August 2010	—N/a	Network; 6 episodes + 1989 Christmas special; 1 disc; BBFC: PG
The Complete Second Series	30 August 2010	—N/a	15 episodes + 1990 Christmas special; 3 discs; BBFC: 12; ACB: PG
The Complete Third Series	31 January 2011	—N/a	12 episodes + 1991 Christmas special; 3 discs; BBFC: PG; ACB: PG
The Complete Series 1–3	—N/a	30 August 2011	ACB: PG
The Complete Series Four	31 January 2011	—N/a	13 episodes + 1992 Christmas special; 2 discs; BBFC: PG; ACB: PG
The Complete Series Five	21 February 2011	—N/a	13 episodes + 1993 Christmas special; 3 discs; BBFC: 12; ACB: PG
The Complete Series Six	21 February 2011	—N/a	14 episodes + 1994 Christmas special; 3 discs; BBFC: 12; ACB: PG
The Complete Series 4–6	—N/a	3 November 2011	ACB: PG
The Complete Series Seven	7 March 2011	—N/a	10 episodes + "The Chigwell Years"; 2 discs; BBFC: 12; ACB: PG
The Complete Series Eight	7 March 2011	—N/a	6 episodes + 1997 Christmas special; 2 discs; BBFC: 12; ACB: PG
The Complete Series Nine	11 April 2011	—N/a	5 episodes + 1998 Christmas special; 1 disc; BBFC: 12; ACB: PG
The Complete Series 7–9	—N/a	1 March 2012	ACB: PG
The Complete BBC Series 1–9	10 October 2011	2 August 2012	102 episodes + all 9 specials; 19 discs (Region 2 & Region 4 re-release); 16 discs (Region 4 original release); BBFC: 12; ACB: PG
The Complete BBC Series 1–9 (reissue)	6 October 2014	16 September 2020	102 episodes + all 9 specials; 19 discs (Region 2 & Region 4 re-release); 16 discs (Region 4 original release); BBFC: 12; ACB: PG
Christmas Specials	3 November 2014	—N/a	Christmas specials 1989, 1990, 1991 & 1992; 1 disc; BBFC: 12; Re-released 17th April 2019
ITV
The Complete ITV Series 1	10 March 2014	27 August 2014	8 episodes; 1 disc; BBFC: 12; ACB: PG
The Complete ITV Series 2	23 February 2015	4 November 2015	8 episodes (including "Birds on a Plane"); 1 disc; BBFC: 12; ACB: PG
The Complete ITV Series 1 & 2	23 February 2015	—N/a	16 episodes (including "Birds on a Plane"); 2 discs; BBFC: 12
The Complete ITV Series 3	29 February 2016	6 July 2016	8 episodesk; 1 disc; BBFC: 12; ACB: PG
The Complete ITV Series 1–3	17 October 2016	17 March 2021	24 episodes (including "Birds on a Plane"); 3 discs; BBFC: 12; ACB: PG
Complete sets
The Collection (BBC & ITV)	13 November 2017	—N/a	127 episodes; Includes all 12 series, the 9 BBC specials, and the first 2 ITV specials; 23 discs; BBFC: 12
The Christmas Collection (BBC & ITV)	13 November 2017	—N/a	All 8 BBC Christmas specials and the first 2 ITV Christmas specials; 3 discs; BBFC: 12
The Ultimate Collection	TBA	9 November 2022	All episodes from the BBC and ITV series, including all specials
