= List of Birds of a Feather episodes =

Birds of a Feather is a British television sitcom, created by Laurence Marks and Maurice Gran, and stars Pauline Quirke, Linda Robson and Lesley Joseph. It was broadcast on BBC One for a nine-year run, before being revived fifteen years later for ITV.

During the course of the programme, 129 episodes of Birds of a Feather aired, including thirteen specials over twelve series, between 16 October 1989 and 24 December 2020.

== Series overview ==
Series
Series	Episodes	Originally released		
Series	Episodes	First released	Last released	Network
1	6	16 October 1989	20 November 1989	BBC One
Special		26 December 1989		BBC One
2	15	6 September 1990	13 December 1990	BBC One
Special		26 December 1990		BBC One
3	12	31 August 1991	16 November 1991	BBC One
Special		25 December 1991		BBC One
4	13	6 September 1992	29 November 1992	BBC One
Special		25 December 1992		BBC One
5	13	5 September 1993	28 November 1993	BBC One
Special		25 December 1993		BBC One
6	13	18 September 1994	11 December 1994	BBC One
Special		24 December 1994		BBC One
Special		3 March 1996		BBC One
7	10	26 May 1997	28 July 1997	BBC One
Special		27 December 1997		BBC One
8	6	5 January 1998	9 February 1998	BBC One
9	5	16 November 1998	14 December 1998	BBC One
Special		24 December 1998		BBC One
10	8	2 January 2014	6 March 2014	ITV
Special		26 December 2014		ITV
11	7	1 January 2015	12 February 2015	ITV
12	8	7 January 2016	25 February 2016	ITV
Special		24 December 2016		ITV
Special		18 December 2017		ITV
Special		24 December 2020		ITV

== Episodes ==
=== Series 1 (1989) ===
No.	Title	Runtime	Directed by	Written by	Original release date	Viewers (millions)
1	"Nicked"	30 minutes	Tony Dow	Laurence Marks and Maurice Gran	16 October 1989	12.02
Sharon visits Tracey's luxury house, 'Dalentrace', in Chigwell and meets Dorien for the first time. Meanwhile, their husbands, Chris and Darryl, take part in an armed robbery and are later jailed for twelve years. Sharon moves from her high-rise Edmonton flat to stay at Dalentrace with her sister.
2	"Just Visiting"	30 minutes	Tony Dow	Laurence Marks and Maurice Gran	23 October 1989	13.03
While Sharon is ecstatic that her no-good husband Chris has been sent to prison, Tracey is desperately missing her beloved Darryl and is on tranquilizers. Now she faces another hurdle – trying to find a way to tell her son, Garth, that his father is in prison.
3	"Shift"	30 minutes	Tony Dow	Laurence Marks and Maurice Gran	30 October 1989	12.13
Sharon's day hasn't started well. She accidentally breaks a mug and spills coffee everywhere and then Tracey accuses her of not paying her way. Tracey is having problems with money, so she and Dorien try to sell some clothes. Meanwhile, Sharon has to go back to her job at the supermarket, but she isn't feeling welcome.
4	"Women's Troubles"	30 minutes	Tony Dow	Laurence Marks and Maurice Gran	6 November 1989	12.54
Tracey thinks she might be pregnant. However, on visiting the doctor, Sharon is horrified to discover she is pregnant by Dave, a man she has only recently met. Tracey can't stop herself telling Dave, who is delighted and immediately phones his mother with the good news. Sharon then confesses to Tracey that she has had an abortion.
5	"Cheat!"	30 minutes	Tony Dow	Laurence Marks and Maurice Gran	13 November 1989	12.93
Sharon is indignant on discovering that 'Fat Stan', to whom she's sublet the flat in Edmonton, is using the property to store goods, as well as prostitutes. Nevertheless, it does bring about a money-making scheme. Tracey, meanwhile, is still suffering from a combination of depression and financial problems. She and Dorien go out to a dinner-and-dance, where Tracey gets hit on by Dorien's husband Marcus.
6	"Substitute"	30 minutes	Tony Dow	Laurence Marks and Maurice Gran	20 November 1989	12.52
Sharon is considering divorcing Chris and Dorien has football hero Patsy Edwards temporarily living in her house, who becomes very fond of Tracey. She doesn't want to be unfaithful to Darryl; however, she suspects him of having an affair with a mysterious woman called Juliet.
Special
7	"Sailing"	30 minutes	Geoffrey Sax	Laurence Marks and Maurice Gran	26 December 1989	10.64
Tracey receives two tickets for a "Christmas Cruise" in the post – a romantic surprise planned by Darryl before being sent to prison. He booked two tickets as he wanted it to be just Tracey and him, thinking Garth would be on a school trip. Tracey decides to take Garth, annoying Sharon who wanted to go. When Garth telephones to say he will not be home for Christmas, Tracey refuses to go at all. However, Dorien devises a plan to get Tracey and Sharon to go on the cruise.

=== Series 2 (1990) ===
No.	Title	Runtime	Directed by	Written by	Original release date	Viewers (millions)
8	"Getting a Grip"	30 minutes	Nic Phillips	Peter Tilbury	6 September 1990	8.51
Tracey is shocked to receive overdue bills. There is also a letter from Garth, telling Tracey he has had a fight at school and she will have to pay for half the damage. To top it all off, the central heating breaks down and they hire two female plumbers, Alison and Gloria. Shortly after they leave, the tank starts leaking.
9	"Sweet Smell of Success"	30 minutes	Nic Phillips	Laurence Marks and Maurice Gran	13 September 1990	10.46
Sharon's former neighbour, Lisa, has made a fortune selling a cheap perfume called 'Aromantique', around town. Sharon and Tracey jump on the bandwagon, as they are in desperate need of money. However, when this proves unsuccessful, Tracey decides to sell Darryl’s Jaguar for money. When a prospective buyer comes to view it, he drives it away. Tracey is later told it has been repossessed as Darryl never kept up the payments. At the next prison visit, Darryl tells her he hid £25,000 in the car’s spare wheel. When Tracey tries to buy the car back, Dorien buys it first to save Tracey’s embarrassment at having the car repossessed.
10	"Young Guns"	30 minutes	Nic Phillips	Keith Lindsay and Martin Tomms	20 September 1990	10.55
Garth brings home a 17-year-old handsome school friend, Richard, for the holidays. Sharon and Tracey suspect Garth is gay and Dorien tells them she thinks Richard is also gay. When Tracey tells Darryl, he is concerned about the effects of people finding out that his son could be gay. Soon after, Tracey and Sharon speak to Garth, who says he is not gay. Moments later, Dorien says she was wrong about Richard being gay, as she has just slept with him.
11	"Muesli"	30 minutes	Charlie Hanson	Steve Coombes and Dave Robinson	27 September 1990	10.09
The release of a fellow inmate plunges Darryl into depression. The anguish rubs off on Tracey, who decides that in an attempt to understand what Darryl is going through, she will live like a prisoner for the weekend. Sharon decides to join her and they set up the spare bedroom like a prison cell. When Dorien gets locked out of the house while Marcus is away, she stays at Tracey and Sharon's and acts like a prison officer. On Sunday, Dorien returns to her house to find that it has been burgled and forgets to unlock Tracey and Sharon. After a short while, they climb out of the window and throw roof tiles in an attempt to get Dorien's attention. However, when one tile ends up going through the car of a police officer investigating Dorien's burglary, they end up in a real prison cell. Meanwhile, Darryl's cell mate, Gary, cheers him up by trying to relive how Darryl spent his weekends before being sent to prison.
12	"Keep off the Grass"	30 minutes	Charlie Hanson	Sue Teddern	4 October 1990	10.63
Sharon and Tracey witness a friend of their husbands, Vinny Hutchins, making a speedy getaway from a post office raid in which a pensioner has been injured. While Tracey wants to turn him in, Sharon vehemently disagrees as it's against criminal ethics. After visiting Darryl and Chris, they change their minds. When Dorien is round, they see an appeal on 'Crime Busters' and Dorien recognises Vinny. Sharon and Tracey, after hearing about the reward money, decide to tell the police but Dorien rings first and uses the money to buy a kitchen from her toyboy Luke, who has been threatened with a move to Northern England unless he sells more kitchens. Tracey, however, blackmails Dorien to give her the kitchen so Vinny's wife can sell it to fund a new life abroad.
13	"Mice"	30 minutes	Charlie Hanson	Gary Lawson and John Phelps	11 October 1990	10.57
Tracey is disgusted by the state of Sharon's bedroom and it also appears Sharon's poor levels of hygiene have spread throughout the house when Tracey discovers they have mice. After cleaning the house and buying poison, Sharon buys a cat, but it does not seem to have any effect. Eventually, Sharon rings pest control, who reveals that he has been at Dorien's house trying to get rid of a major mice infestation and the mice have come from her.
14	"Brief Encounter"	30 minutes	Nic Phillips	Peter Tilbury	18 October 1990	12.08
Sharon goes to the aid of 53-year-old Don Sheridan who is mugged at Chigwell tube station. That evening, they accidentally meet at a bar and he says he is in Chigwell on business as financial adviser to Marcus, who is apparently near to going under. They go out several times and sleep together, despite him being married. On his final night before going home, they plan to re-live the 1960s by taking drugs, which Sharon had been given to pass to Chris in prison. The police arrive to return Don's wallet, leading Don to flush the drugs down the toilet. Meanwhile, Dorien pays £2000 to have her telephone number changed to 071, as she sees it as more exclusive.
15	"You Pays Yer Money"	30 minutes	Charlie Hanson	George Costigan and Julia North	25 October 1990	12.68
With an upcoming parliamentary by-election, Sharon discovers that Tracey did not register her to vote in Chigwell. However, she did register Darryl, not wanting to admit he was in prison. Darryl agrees that Sharon can buy his vote for £350. Meanwhile, Dorien is backing the Green Party as she fancies the party's agent. While Sharon avidly votes Labour, Tracey is unsure whom to vote for, so she arranges for each candidate to pay her a visit. At the polling station, Tracey votes Labour, as does Dorien when she finds out the agent is having a relationship with the Green candidate.
16	"Trust"	30 minutes	Nic Phillips	Gary Lawson and John Phelps	1 November 1990	12.86
Tracey is doing her best to quit smoking and is undergoing psychotherapy, where she develops a crush on the psychotherapist, Gerald. Darryl suspects she is having an affair and forbids her to see Gerald again. Nonetheless, Tracey soon meets him in a wine bar. She tells Gerald of her feelings and he says they should not see each other again, as she has developed an emotional dependency. Sharon and Dorien then persuade Tracey not to tell Darryl the feelings she had for Gerald and before long she is back on the cigarettes.
17	"Thirty Something"	30 minutes	Nic Phillips	Peter Tilbury	8 November 1990	12.98
As Sharon approaches her 30th birthday, she looks back on her life and regrets her lack of education. She pays a visit to her Edmonton council flat, where she meets Lisa, whose criminal partner is in the property business and Sharon considers buying the flat. Tracey disapproves of the idea. Dorien, however, is more encouraging and goes with Sharon to the flat. However, Lisa's partner is soon sent to prison and Sharon then takes his place on a holiday with Lisa to Benidorm with Club 18-30.
18	"Love on the Run"	30 minutes	Charlie Hanson	Laurence Marks and Maurice Gran	15 November 1990	12.45
Darryl is in hospital and plans to escape for one night so he can be with Tracey. With the help of a nurse, the police guard is drugged and Darryl and Tracey go to a hotel. Meanwhile, Sharon is spending the night with Martin, an artist she recently met. The following morning, the taxi Darryl and Tracey are in is stopped by the police and the driver is arrested for drink-driving. Tracey rings Sharon, who then drives with Dorien to pick Darryl and Tracey up and take them back to the hospital. They get back just after the guard wakes up and doesn't realise Darryl escaped.
19	"Old Friends"	30 minutes	Sue Bysh	John Ross	22 November 1990	13.39
While out shopping, Tracey runs into Trish Taylor, her best friend from school and invites her to stay, as Trish has recently left her husband. Sharon feels left out and also worried that when Darryl gets out of prison, Tracey will make her move out. After taking Dorien's advice, Sharon goes out with Trish and they get on well. Meanwhile, Tracey is annoyed with both Sharon and Trish – Trish for constantly talking about the old days and Sharon for not cleaning a saucepan that has been in the sink for several days. Trish soon leaves and goes back to her husband.
20	"Parting"	30 minutes	Nic Phillips	Gary Lawson and John Phelps	29 November 1990	12.88
Chris begs Sharon to visit him, but she tells him that she plans to sell her wedding ring and forget she ever met him. Then Chris reveals that one of his testicles is expanding, but Sharon doesn't believe him. He is soon diagnosed with a malignant tumor in the testicle. She goes to see him in hospital and Chris says he still loves her, but Sharon still wants their relationship to end. Tracey is annoyed by this, but Sharon wants to move on with her life. She does agree to continue seeing Chris on occasion.
21	"Jobs for the Girls"	30 minutes	Sue Bysh	Sue Teddern	6 December 1990	12.90
In order to make money for Christmas, Sharon becomes a dog-walker and cat-sitter and soon comes up against stiff competition from Dorien's 13-year-old friend Adrian Gold. Meanwhile, Tracey becomes a typist and, after having problems with the typewriter and uses a word processor. She agrees to type up a manuscript for a novel that Dorien has written. Sharon later notices that Dorien's manuscript is largely copied from The French Lieutenant's Woman and Dorien admits she just wanted Sharon and Tracey to think she had a talent.
22	"Someone Else's Baby"	30 minutes	Charlie Hanson	Frankie Bailey	13 December 1990	12.68
With the Antiques Roadshow coming to Chigwell, Sharon, Dorien and Tracey go into Tracey and Sharon's loft. Sharon discovers some letters written by her mother suggesting either she or Tracey were adopted. After some arguing between Sharon and Tracey, Sharon invites round their mother's sister, Auntie Sylvie, who finally tells them that they were both adopted but they are still biological sisters. Meanwhile, Dorien goes to the Antiques Roadshow with a family heirloom, but to her horror discovers the Russian Empire vase is in fact a mid-20th century East End fake.
Special
23	"Falling in Love Again"	75 minutes	Nic Phillips	Laurence Marks and Maurice Gran	26 December 1990	12.18
Chris owes two fellow prisoners £3000 and their wives threaten Sharon and Tracey. Chris has a plan to raise the money which involves Sharon going to Germany to pick up a collectable car that he had while in Germany with the Army during the Cold War. Sharon manages to win a week in Berlin on the game show Second Time Lucky presented by Leslie Crowther. She is accompanied by Barry, the show's other winner and Tracey. Sharon and Barry don't get on well and try to keep separate as they tour the city with the cameras while Tracey tracks down the car, with the help of mechanic Manfred. Tracey and Manfred soon start to fall in love with each other. Back in England, Tracey ends their relationship over the telephone when she realises how much she loves Darryl. However, Manfred still sends the car over. Meanwhile, Luke dumps Dorien and she tries to get more romantic with Marcus, who she soon discovers is having an affair with a younger woman.

=== Series 3 (1991) ===
No.	Title	Runtime	Directed by	Written by	Original release date	Viewers (millions)
24	"Keeping Up Appearances"	30 minutes	Nic Phillips	Laurence Marks and Maurice Gran	31 August 1991	9.59
While a prison visit ends with Sharon being ejected for violence, Darryl's appearance seems to have taken a turn for the worse. Nevertheless, he asks Tracey to look sexier on her next visit, so Dorien offers to loan her a selection of revealing outfits.
25	"Tinker, Tailor"	30 minutes	Charlie Hanson	Peter Tilbury	7 September 1991	11.36
When a man, Charles Fitzroy, knocks on the door one evening asking for some water for his car, Sharon tells him all about Dorien and her relationships, which he seems interested in. After visiting Chris in prison, Sharon suspects that Charles may have been a police spy interested in the proceeds of Darryl and Chris' crimes. Soon after two policemen come round and they ask about the whereabouts of Dorien and Marcus, who needs to be questioned about a major fraud case of which he was the accountant. Sharon tells them they are on holiday in Zurich. When Dorien returns she finds that a Sunday newspaper has an article on her private life and Sharon and Tracey feel guilty.
26	"Baby Come Back"	30 minutes	Nic Phillips	Sue Teddern	14 September 1991	10.79
Sharon is at the shopping centre selling double glazing when she meets up with Dave, with whom she had an affair and whose baby she aborted. However, it transpires that Dave already has a wife who is in fact eight months pregnant, which causes an uneasy relationship between him and Sharon. Meanwhile, Dorien agonises over what to wear to her nephew's briss, and Tracey finds herself missing family life.
27	"Just Family"	30 minutes	Nic Phillips	Geoff Rowley	21 September 1991	11.85
Darryl's parents, Les and Olive Stubbs, get into touch for the first time since his trial. Despite always hating them, Tracey invites them round for dinner. Dorien insists on coming round for the evening and helping with the cooking – although it later turns out she did this as she was expecting a boyfriend to call her on their number. A few days later Les and Olive write a letter to Darryl saying that Tracey's house is depraved and he suggests they move there from their prefab in Poplar. Tracey and Sharon are horrified by this. When Darryl's parents and Tracey all visit him in prison, an argument soon occurs and he finds out what his parents are really like.
28	"Confidence"	30 minutes	Charlie Hanson	Gary Lawson and John Phelps	28 September 1991	10.97
With money tight, Sharon has taken a job, but Tracey seems reluctant to follow, despite Sharon and Dorien's encouragement. Tracey admits to having little confidence, having never been allowed to work during her marriage, but Sharon volunteers her to do some voluntary work for Siobhan, the editor of the prisoners' dependents newsletter. Sharon then goes with Tracey when she goes to apply for a receptionist job but is worried about the application form, which makes her realise how few qualifications and little experience she has. Sharon gets the job by lying on the application form.
29	"The Lost Weekend"	30 minutes	Nic Phillips	Peter Tilbury	5 October 1991	9.57
It's Thursday night. Dorien's date has been cancelled, and Sharon and Tracey are bored. When the VCR blows up, Dorien generously offers to pay for an activity weekend for the girls. Sharon is unsure about the activity on offer which is hang gliding, later it turns out Dorien has had an accident so the activity weekend is cancelled.
30	"History"	30 minutes	Nic Phillips	Peter Tilbury	12 October 1991	12.40
Dorien suggests a car-boot sale, and the girls are keen – Sharon can get rid of some of Chris's old stuff, and Tracey will sell things that son Garth has outgrown. However, while clearing out possessions, an old photo is found with Darryl at a party, under the table with someone else. Sharon is chucked out of the house by Tracey for keeping it a secret.
31	"Poetic Justice"	30 minutes	Charlie Hanson	Laurence Marks and Maurice Gran	19 October 1991	12.40
Chris and Darryl are temporarily in Albany prison on the Isle of Wight. Sharon cancels her visit for Dorien so she can interview Chris about sexual deprivation for her OU dissertation. But while Dorien becomes the centre of attention, Tracey becomes a victim of food poisoning after eating at a motorway cafe.
32	"Favour of the Month"	30 minutes	Nic Phillips	Geoff Rowley	26 October 1991	12.85
Desmond Gibbs, an 'old prison friend' of Darryl's, turns up at Dalentrace to visit Tracey. With a squash injury keeping Marcus at home – and ruining Dorien's planned adventures with her toyboy – Sharon suggests that the accident-prone Desmond acts as temporary chauffeur.
33	"Cuckoo"	30 minutes	Charlie Hanson	Peter Tilbury	2 November 1991	12.37
Sharon finds herself facing criminal charges after it is revealed her flat is now housing belligerent squatters Cedric and Egbert; her neighbour has also been acquiring mail-order items using Sharon's identity. Chris offers to sort things out – with the aid of 'Batty' Harold and his mates, who specialise in GBH.
34	"Schooling"	30 minutes	Charlie Hanson	Geoff Rowley	9 November 1991	12.27
Sharon warns Tracey that her son will be a "mummy's boy" if she isn't careful. Sharon has also taken to dressing up and going out a lot, claiming she is going for job interviews. In fact, she is having lunch with the up-market Mark and they're now on their sixth date. However, her hopes of happiness are dashed when discovering Mark is an overgrown kid controlled by his mother.
35	"Business"	30 minutes	Nic Phillips	Gary Lawson and John Phelps	16 November 1991	14.36
Sharon's cleaning job has caused her to develop an allergy. Returning from the doctor, she finds a letter from Chris telling her that his Uncle Costas has died and left him his cafe and drinking club. She later visits the cafe and asks Tracey to help her out, but Sharon just lets Tracey do all the work.
Special
36	"We'll Always Have Majorca"	50 minutes	Nic Phillips	Peter Tilbury	25 December 1991	12.39
Abel Kane, ex-rock star and ex-cellmate of Darryl, offers the sisters, Garth and Dorien free use of his villa in Majorca. On arrival the women are shocked to find Darryl and Chris are there, having escaped whilst touring with the prison rock band. Helpful local Pedro comes in to clean and rescues Sharon, Tracey and Dorien after they have been stranded on an island after a boat trip. On return to the villa, however, they find someone has planted drugs in Dorien's suitcase and the three get thrown in jail. Fortunately, Darryl uses his insider information to bust a drug-smuggling racket and get them all freed.

=== Series 4 (1992) ===
No.	Title	Runtime	Directed by	Written by	Original release date	Viewers (millions)
37	"Breadwinner"	30 minutes	Terry Kinane	Gary Lawson and John Phelps	6 September 1992	12.33
With the cafe going well, Sharon is in the money and rather full of herself. Tracey doesn't like being dependent on her and wants to start a job. In prison, Chris is being obnoxiously vocal about the thriving business and getting right up the noses of his fellow inmates.
38	"Food for Thought"	30 minutes	Terry Kinane	Sue Teddern	13 September 1992	11.33
Garth has deliberately blown his chance of a City job to go on a catering course in Nottingham. Tracey is upset, but offers to go along with it if he does well working in Sharon's cafe. Meanwhile, Dorien has enrolled on a psychology course in Harlow, posing as a penniless widow to gain her tutor’s sympathy.
39	"Commitments"	30 minutes	Terry Kinane	Sue Teddern	20 September 1992	10.52
With Marcus away, Dorien briefly moves in with Luke who is now single. Chris tells Sharon of his plans to marry Tina from Cyprus with whom he has been corresponding. But it transpires Tina has ulterior motives and takes the cafe away from Sharon. Fortunately, when Tina sees that the cafe is not what Chris made it out to be, she departs from his life and Sharon is back in business. Dorien later returns to Chigwell because she feels uncomfortable living with Luke.
40	"Wipe That Smile off Your Tape"	30 minutes	Terry Kinane	Miles Tredinnick	27 September 1992	11.20
Sharon joins a video-dating agency, and Dorien shoots the tape – on which Sharon lies outrageously about her status. She gets tapes from two potential suitors: Mike, who's 'big in the leisure industry', and Jimmy, a nervous flying instructor.
41	"Caring"	30 minutes	Terry Kinane	Gary Lawson and John Phelps	4 October 1992	11.29
Sharon and Tracey's ageing Aunt Sylvie, who cared for them as teenagers, is in hospital with a broken leg. Sharon insists that she comes to live at Dalentrace rather than go into an old folks' home. But Sylvie proves to be a bit of a handful and eventually it causes the girls to rethink and contemplate old age and their futures.
42	"Nine and a Half Days"	30 minutes	Terry Kinane	Laurence Marks and Maurice Gran	11 October 1992	11.67
Sharon begins a relationship with Gil, a fellow Support Group member who doesn't want to stay with his wife after she is released from prison. Gil wants Sharon to move to Norwich with him, but Tracey isn't happy about Sharon's decision. As Sharon is preparing to tell Chris about her new man, worrying news about his cell-mate stops her in her tracks.
43	"Belongings"	30 minutes	Terry Kinane	Geoff Rowley	18 October 1992	10.99
Sharon has become fed up with the rowdy mechanics and pensioners who form the clientele of the cafe, and closes it down. Dorien urges her to re-launch it as an upmarket bagel bar, this leads to Sharon abandoning the Greek community and being left with an unsuccessful business.
44	"Hungry for Love"	30 minutes	Terry Kinane	Geoffrey Deane	25 October 1992	12.21
Tracey goes on a strict diet after Darryl makes an innocent remark about her weight. As Tracey becomes increasingly grumpy and hungry from having to eat healthily, Dorien tries to get her personal trainer to take an interest in her.
45	"Time and Tides"	30 minutes	Terry Kinane	Geoff Rowley	1 November 1992	12.41
Garth has got into the Guinness Book of Records as a champion pancake-tosser, though Darryl doesn't think a sponsored pancake toss is something to be proud of. Meanwhile, Dorien thinks she's pregnant but is in for a shock when it turns out she is going through the menopause. She becomes depressed but is soon back to her old ways when Sharon suggests something.
46	"Sisters Are Doing It"	30 minutes	Terry Kinane	Sue Teddern	8 November 1992	12.74
Tracey is suffering sexual harassment from the boss in her new temporary job as a secretary. She says it's badinage that she simply has to tolerate; Sharon and Dorien are incensed and decide to plan a Thelma and Louise-style revenge on the boss.
47	"The Front"	30 minutes	Terry Kinane	Peter Tilbury	15 November 1992	13.08
Dorien's manuscript, Promises To Keep, has been taken up by a publisher, but it's too raunchy to publish under her own name. She has already given her name as 'Sharon Theodopolopoudos'; now she needs the girls' help to keep up the pretence.
48	"Okey-Cokey-Karaoke"	30 minutes	Terry Kinane	Geoffrey Deane	22 November 1992	12.78
Sharon and Tracey participate in a singing competition to win money for a holiday. Only solo acts are permitted, so Sharon goes onstage alone – and wins the heat. But when stage fright assails her at the final, Dorien steps in her place, singing a stunning performance of Like a Virgin, and wins the money for the girls.
49	"Loyalty"	30 minutes	Terry Kinane	Gary Lawson and John Phelps	29 November 1992	12.25
While Dorien seeks a destination for all the money Marcus has given her, it's all bad news for Sharon – the landlords have refused permission for alterations at the cafe, and intend to double the rent. There is a solution, but it would involve using Dalentrace as collateral and Tracey and Darryl are none too pleased to hear about it.
Special
50	"The Chigwell Connection"	50 minutes	Terry Kinane	Laurence Marks and Maurice Gran	25 December 1992	16.88
When doubt is cast on the integrity of the officer who arrested Chris and Darryl, the sisters start a campaign to Free the Chigwell Two. Dorien, meanwhile, suffers humiliation at the hands of tennis playing gossip queen Melanie Fishman when Marcus is accused of drug-running.

=== Series 5 (1993) ===
No.	Title	Runtime	Directed by	Written by	Original release date	Viewers (millions)
51	"High Fidelity"	30 minutes	Terry Kinane	Jenny LeCoat	5 September 1993	13.76
Dorien's pursuing male model Jason with little success, while both Sharon and Tracey are attracted to his friend, Mark. As Mark can't read, Sharon gives him lessons – but it's Tracey he's interested in. Sharon is quick to remind her sister she is still married.
52	"Bang"	30 minutes	Terry Kinane	Gary Lawson and John Phelps	12 September 1993	14.72
Sharon accidentally blows up the kitchen after leaving the gas on. As the insurance policy covers only 75 per cent of the cost, Sharon asks her friend Nobby to fit a new kitchen cheaply. Dorien invites Sharon and Tracey to stay with her while the kitchen is fitted, as a way to avoid a weekend with her mother-in-law. However, Dorien proves to be a far from gracious host, and the sisters quickly outstay their welcome.
53	"Non-Starter"	30 minutes	Terry Kinane	Geoff Rowley	19 September 1993	14.56
Dorien tries, and fails, to sell her unwanted furniture, and Sharon badgers Tracey into giving her driving lessons; after one of Sharon's disastrous driving tests it doesn't take long for Tracey's nerves to go bad. Eventually, Sharon's driving errors lead to her crashing into the van taking Darryl and Chris to a new prison, and the girls are suspected of organising a jail-break – before making the joke spot on the news.
54	"Absent Friends"	30 minutes	Charlie Hanson	Geoff Rowley	26 September 1993	11.59
After a spate of burglaries, the sisters find themselves on the agenda of a Neighbourhood Watch meeting at Dorien's house. But is there a connection between the crimes and the anonymous letters and calls Tracey has been receiving?
55	"Suspicious Minds"	30 minutes	Terry Kinane	Tony Millan and Mike Walling	3 October 1993	11.56
Chris proudly announces he has done a deal to arrange a delivery of cheap food to the cafe. Sharon is not pleased. Dorien and Marcus fall out because Marcus seems to spend more time with other people than with his wife. When Marcus doesn't show up to help Sharon with her tax like he said he would, the sisters get suspicious. There suspicions are made worse when they find Dorien burying something big in her garden in the middle of the night...
56	"Dead Loss"	30 minutes	Terry Kinane	Geoff Rowley	10 October 1993	11.33
Chris gets compassionate leave after his mother dies but, after the funeral, he goes on a drunken bender and is adamant that he is not going back to prison. Dorien, meanwhile, is incensed – her "frenemy" Melanie Fishman has beaten her for providing the best charity. On learning that Chris's mother has died, she sees a chance to regain status by comforting mourners at the wake.
57	"A Brush With the Law"	30 minutes	Terry Kinane	Sue Teddern	17 October 1993	10.94
Tracey reveals a talent for decorating, and Dorien suggests launching an interior design business. The plan is for Tracey to do the work while Dorien scours the countryside for antiques; their first client is to Melanie Fishman. Sharon meets the attractive Colin in a cinema queue and they click, but he has failed to tell her that he is a policeman. Sharon feels that their future is doomed, though he would still like them to be friends.
58	"Mind Over Matter"	30 minutes	Charlie Hanson	Richard Preddy and Gary Howe	24 October 1993	11.07
Sharon has raging toothache, but also a phobia about dentists. Dorien is terrified of spiders. They agree that if Dorien confronts her fear of spiders then Sharon will have treatment under hypnosis provided by Dorien. However, Dorien's hypnosis lands Sharon in hospital and when the sisters and Dorien arrive back home after going for a few drinks to celebrate Sharon overcoming her fear, Sharon soon realises where she had all the money to afford the drinks which could land Chris in trouble.
59	"East Side Story"	30 minutes	Terry Kinane	Geoffrey Deane	31 October 1993	11.79
Sharon thinks Garth should have a proper social life instead of lounging around at home. Rosa, the teenage daughter of Marcus's cousin Fay, who Dorien is asked to 'baby-sit' arrives and Garth tries to bond with her. Unfortunately, Rosa turns out to be not quite so demure as she would like people to believe.
60	"Find the Lady"	30 minutes	Charlie Hanson	Peter Tilbury	7 November 1993	10.92
Tracey meets Darryl's pension advisor, who spots a large unexplained payment in 1988. It seems Darryl and Chris were in on a fiddle suggested by a bent tax inspector, and the money was invested with a financial advisor who now proves elusive. Tracey is worried so it's up to her, Sharon, Dorien and Garth to tackle some detective work.
61	"An Inspector Stays"	30 minutes	Terry Kinane	Laurence Marks and Maurice Gran	14 November 1993	11.41
Sharon's relationship with Colin (Eamonn Walker) is blossoming; he is introducing her to culture, and she's started listening to classical music. Then, he asks if the police can use Dalentrace to mount a surveillance operation. Tracey is unhappy with undercover detectives staying at her house, and she also fears Garth is taking drugs. Later, the sisters discover the detective is a cheat and using Tracey’s house for immoral purposes.
62	"All Gone Pear Shaped"	30 minutes	Terry Kinane	Sue Teddern	21 November 1993	11.86
Sharon tells Chris that her relationship with Colin is serious, although she doesn't initially reveal that he's a policeman. But when Colin plans a surprise evening with friends – all of whom work in the police force – she begins to have doubts. Meanwhile, Tracey helps a prisoner’s wife called Hailey, and Dorien feels left out as the sisters seem to not have time for her.
63	"The Beautiful Game"	30 minutes	Charlie Hanson	Geoffrey Deane	28 November 1993	11.67
Chris urges Sharon to contact a cousin, Helena, whose father is wealthy and whose son, Nicky, is a keen footballer – there could be money in it. At Nicky's next match, Tracey surprises everyone with her determination towards football and lands the role of manager. Sharon and Tracey come to blows, as the two have very different ideas with regards to team spirit and sportsman-ship. Sharon and Dorien also fall out over a game of Monopoly.
Special
64	"It Happened In Hollywood"	60 minutes	Charlie Hanson	Geoffrey Deane	25 December 1993	19.39
At the funeral of their Aunt Sylvie, an old male friend of Sylvia's gives Sharon and Tracey the key to a safety deposit box, which contains their real birth certificates. Their father's name is George Hamilton – who they believe to be George Hamilton, the Hollywood actor. Thanks to Dorien, who of course goes with them, the sisters fly out to Hollywood to track him down. Their plans to confront him do not go well as they are chased off a film set, and Dorien mistakenly imprisoned for stalking the actor George Wendt. Fate eventually intervenes and they get to spend an afternoon with Hamilton, who turns out not to be their father after all. Though they never learn it, the truth is far less glamorous.

=== Series 6 (1994) ===
No.	Title	Runtime	Directed by	Written by	Original release date	Viewers (millions)
65	"Not In My Backyard"	30 minutes	Charlie Hanson	Laurence Marks and Maurice Gran	18 September 1994	8.74
Someone has bought the neighbouring Theydon Lodge, and wants to buy twenty feet of back garden from Dorien and Tracey in order to build a sports complex. Dorien is unwilling, but comes round when Tracey convinces her that their new neighbour is Princess Diana. Dorien has high hopes for raised house prices and status, which leads to only disappointment when the neighbour turns out to be just a Diana lookalike.
66	"Mrs Robinson"	30 minutes	Charlie Hanson	Geoff Rowley	25 September 1994	8.37
Garth is seeing Linda, an older divorcée – to Tracey's alarm. Chris, meanwhile, has turned his hand to creative writing; Sharon is shocked by his work and brands it as 'filth', and Dorien wants to know if any other inmates are writing similar material.
67	"First Time Caller"	30 minutes	Charlie Hanson	Tony Millan and Mike Walling	2 October 1994	8.85
Dorien is taking a first-aid course, albeit for dubious reasons, and Sharon is doing a special breakfast deal for pensioners – but what is Tracey doing that's useful? When Darryl fails to reassure her, a radio show seems to offer the answer.
68	"Compulsion"	30 minutes	Charlie Hanson	Laurence Marks and Maurice Gran	9 October 1994	8.93
Tracey attempts to master her new knitting machine but manages to produce only a waistcoat that looks more like a dishcloth. Dorien, meanwhile, is embarking on some immense spending sprees, so the girls try to get to the root of the problem. It turns out to be a reaction against her mother marrying some other man.
69	"All Day and All of the Night"	30 minutes	Terry Kinane	Alun Lewis	16 October 1994	10.16
To comply with the health inspector's demands, Sharon is having some work done at the cafe. Chris's cousin Georgiou is supposed to be doing it on the cheap, but has instead turned the place into a nightclub – and is splitting the proceeds with Chris.
70	"Appreciation Society"	30 minutes	Charlie Hanson	Geoff Rowley	23 October 1994	9.67
Sharon complains about how hard it is at the café, but Tracey retorts it's just as hard work at home. After a heated argument, Sharon and Tracey agree to change places for a week: Sharon will be Garth's 'mum' and Tracey will run the café. Meanwhile, Dorien has gone into hiding after receiving anonymous letters threatening to expose her affairs.
71	"Moving"	30 minutes	Charlie Hanson	Gary Lawson and John Phelps	30 October 1994	10.41
After a conversation with Darryl, Tracey considers selling the house and making a move to the country. Garth, meanwhile, makes himself at home in the newly-converted flat above Sharon's cafe. His relationship with flatmate Kate is supposedly platonic – he's even told her that he's gay – but Sharon finds out Garth's lying and also finds out she will be left behind if Tracey leaves for the country.
72	"Out"	30 minutes	Charlie Hanson	Gary Lawson and John Phelps	6 November 1994	10.28
Sharon is angry because Chris has applied for home leave; she feels twelve years should mean twelve years. Tracey asks Sharon why she stays with Chris if he's so terrible? But Chris insists he's a changed man until he is caught flirting with the probation officer.
73	"In At the Deep End"	30 minutes	Terry Kinane	Tony Millan and Mike Walling	13 November 1994	9.44
Tracey opens a letter to Darryl asking him to install a swimming pool. Sharon says a swimming pool is only a hole in the ground with tiles, and building one shouldn't be difficult; after all, she has a café full of builders.
74	"Business Is Business"	30 minutes	Terry Kinane	Geoff Rowley	20 November 1994	10.62
Sharon is struggling to combine running the cafe with the new pool business, and is desperate for the cafe to be sold. Chris makes her promise she will sell it to a Greek, but Marcus has a client apparently offering £30,000. Dorien's holiday depends on it.
75	"Puppy Love"	30 minutes	Terry Kinane	Sue Teddern	27 November 1994	9.76
The girls reminisce about their childhood sweethearts, and decide to trace them. There are surprises all round – Dorien's childhood sweetheart Derek Henty is now a government minister, who thinks he's fallen victim to blackmail. Sharon meets up with a once spotty schoolboy who is now a dashing gay hunk. To make Dorien jealous, Sharon pretends she will be marrying him.
76	"Still Waters Run Deep"	30 minutes	Terry Kinane	Geoffrey Deane	4 December 1994	12.78
The swimming pool business is thriving and Sharon and Tracey are happy. Then, prospective client Monty Kray asks for a pool to be installed within days, as a present for his wife while they're away. The girls agree, unaware that Kenny and the boys are in Florida. Meanwhile, Dorien is consumed by guilt when Marcus suffers a heart attack.
77	"On the Glass"	30 minutes	Terry Kinane	Geoffrey Deane	11 December 1994	11.14
The order book is empty, and Sharon is cleaned out after a bout of extravagant spending. Dorien is fed up because Marcus is hanging around her while recovering from his heart attack and has slashed her credit-card limit.
Special
78	"Christmas In Dreamland"	50 minutes	Charlie Hanson	Laurence Marks and Maurice Gran	24 December 1994	13.79
It's Christmas Eve. After over-indulging, Sharon nods off and dreams of a very different life. Chris is a rich and famous pop star, she is his glamorous diva wife, and Dorien is their virginal spinster cleaning lady. Tracey, meanwhile, is a down and out, living in a council flat with her layabout husband Darryl and their delinquent son Garth.

=== Special (1996) ===
No.	Title	Runtime	Directed by	Written by	Original release date	Viewers (millions)
79	"The Chigwell Years"	30 minutes	Charlie Hanson	Laurence Marks and Maurice Gran	3 March 1996	13.56
As Tracey prepares to write her autobiography, the sisters and Dorien reminisce about the six years that they have been neighbours and friends; using clips from previous series, this episode primarily consists of archive footage. For the first and only time in the entire series, the fourth wall is broken when Dorien mentions the closing credits.

=== Series 7 (1997) ===
No.	Title	Runtime	Directed by	Written by	Original release date	Viewers (millions)
80	"Stand By Your Man"	30 minutes	Baz Taylor	Sue Teddern	26 May 1997	9.85
Brute force or blatant charm; one or the other is needed fast if Sharon and Tracey are to stop their swimming pool business from going down the drain. However, a phone call brings exciting news for Tracey – Darryl is being released from prison in a fortnight. For Sharon the news is far from exciting, especially after Chris reveals he is also being released.
81	"Nearest and Dearest"	30 minutes	Baz Taylor	Damon Rochefort	2 June 1997	8.12
Sharon has a blazing row with Dorien, leading to her believing she has to alter her selfish ways. In an attempt to be more thoughtful, Dorien organises a day of opera and manicures for herself and Sharon. Sharon isn’t keen on the idea and explains she’s attending a funeral on that day; however, her plan goes pear-shaped when Dorien offers to come to the funeral with her. Meanwhile, Darryl is just one week away from coming home, and Tracey is seeking some tips to put the magic back into her marriage.
82	"Cheers"	30 minutes	Baz Taylor	Laurence Marks and Maurice Gran	9 June 1997	8.33
Darryl and Chris are released from prison. Chris gets hit by a car on the way out of the prison and spends his first free night in hospital. This leaves Sharon free to invite "Snotty Scotty", an old school friend, to Darryl’s welcome-home party. Unfortunately for Tracey, Darryl's homecoming is blighted by temporary impotence and he spends the night down the pub. Meanwhile, Marcus finally catches Dorien in the act with a business associate.
83	"Relative Strangers"	30 minutes	Baz Taylor	Geoff Rowley	16 June 1997	8.15
Dorien has moved in with her mother after being kicked out by Marcus, but then discovers her husband has been leading a double life. Darryl readjusts himself to life back at home, and Chris is safely installed in a flat, determined to win Sharon's affections. Darryl throws Sharon out of his house after a heated argument, leaving Sharon no choice but to move in with Chris.
84	"Porridge"	30 minutes	Baz Taylor	Gary Lawson and John Phelps	23 June 1997	8.35
Sharon isn't happy about living with Chris and is prepared to go to any lengths to get a home of her own. Dorien is determined to win custody of the house and, posing as a barmaid, tracks down Marcus’s mistress in order to find out some home truths. Meanwhile, after failing to bring home the bacon, Darryl meets a trickster who supplies him with counterfeit money. Chris and Darryl are both caught and are sent back to prison at HMP Slade, made famous in Ronnie Barker's Porridge.
85	"Rising Damp"	30 minutes	Baz Taylor	Sue Teddern	30 June 1997	8.30
Tracey decides to forget about Darryl and tries to live life to the full, and heads out on the pull to find men much to Sharon's disgust. While Garth is baffled by his mum's behaviour, Sharon gets on the TV to appeal for Chris's release, but ends up fighting the channel’s mascot – a man dressed as a dog. Dorien gets her house back from Marcus.
86	"Three Up, Two Down"	30 minutes	Baz Taylor	Gary Lawson and John Phelps	7 July 1997	7.60
Dalentrace is in jeopardy as Sharon and Tracey sink into debt; Dorien's generosity cannot be a permanent solution. But Tracey is becoming a decisive woman, and is taking matters into her own hands. Garth, meanwhile, decides to move in with his girlfriend Kimberly.
87	"Are You Being Served?"	30 minutes	Baz Taylor	Gary Lawson and John Phelps	14 July 1997	7.76
Sharon and Tracey try to adjust to life in their new home. Sharon decides that she wants to have a baby and tries to find a man. Dorien has returned home from a holiday in Monaco and has met a man. It turns out that the man has been reported in most of the tabloids, Dorien is disappointed that she isn't featured in the articles as well.
88	"Never the Twain"	30 minutes	Baz Taylor	Laurence Marks and Maurice Gran	21 July 1997	7.48
Dorien is holed up in a Lake District hotel being pampered and speaking with journalist David Kane. Sharon has started thinking about adoption, while Garth is worried about his dad. The sisters set off to visit their husbands in their new prison, Slade, but later become stranded on a train during a blizzard.
89	"Three's Company"	30 minutes	Baz Taylor	Geoff Rowley	28 July 1997	6.74
Sharon is still assessing men for their reproductive potential, making Tracey feel rather uncomfortable. 'Nouveau destitute' Dorien suddenly recalls she has a very rich mother-in-law, while Tracey drops the bombshell that she is pregnant and isn't sure it's Darryl's.

=== Series 8 (1997–98) ===
No.	Title	Runtime	Directed by	Written by	Original release date	Viewers (millions)
Special
90	"Reservoir Birds"	50 minutes	Hugh Thomas	Gary Lawson and John Phelps	27 December 1997	12.36
Sharon and Tracey are working at a casino, Tracey is a croupier and Sharon is cleaning the toilets. The girls agree to take part in a publicity stunt in which Sharon 'appears' to win a million pounds. The sisters are unaware that they have been set up as thieves by the corrupt casino broker, Davey Cooper, who is in league with a bent cop. The plan is that the girls get the blame and are arrested whilst Cooper pockets the millions. Sharon and Tracey go on the run, helped by their cousin Dawn, who is getting married, culminating in a chase where Sharon, Tracey, and Dorien – who just happens to have slept with Davey – are taken hostage but pull together to clear their names.
Series
91	"Trouble and Strife"	30 minutes	Hugh Thomas	Gary Lawson and John Phelps	5 January 1998	11.31
When Sharon wrecks Tracey's bed, it is the final straw. She promises to get a job and make a contribution – especially with Tracey's baby on the way. A stint in an abattoir ends when she is sacked for stealing meat, but Dorien is looking for a cleaner.
92	"The Essex Patient"	30 minutes	Hugh Thomas	Damon Rochefort	12 January 1998	11.64
Tracey and Sharon hit on a name for their new cleaning business: 'Maids of Ongar'. Then, after a strenuous day's work, Sharon begins to feel ill; before long she starts to faint. Dorien's energy-channelling session fails to help. She then arrives from the hospital announcing that she has an allergy, but it's later found to be self-inflicted due to her over eating. The title of the series is mentioned in this episode, which although takes the audience by surprise does not result in the fourth wall being broken.
93	"Maids of Ongar"	30 minutes	Hugh Thomas	Sam Lawrence	19 January 1998	13.30
The girls are short of money, and go to see bank manager Martin Mann but he refuses to lend money to the wives of bank robbers – particularly as he was the bank manager Darryl and Chris robbed. Sharon and Tracey decide to let Dorien offer them a job cleaning at a hotel.
94	"Baggage"	30 minutes	Hugh Thomas	Geoff Rowley	26 January 1998	13.21
Sharon and Tracey attend a school reunion. Sharon finds out that Margie is still the bully she once was when they were children, and Poxy Loxy is as leery as ever – trying to seduce Tracey. Meanwhile, Dorien meets someone from the past.
95	"Can't Judge a Book"	30 minutes	Hugh Thomas	Sue Teddern	2 February 1998	10.98
Tracey wants Sharon to lose weight. Sharon doesn't think she can do it, but Tracey offers to help. Later, Sharon's weight-loss campaign suffers a setback when Chris reveals he's in love with a female visitor who is overweight, who Sharon talked to in a queue outside the prison. Tracey's efforts to get Dorien to dress her age are sabotaged by the bitchy Melanie Fishman and Dorien's new beau, Richard.
96	"Money"	30 minutes	Hugh Thomas	Ian Davidson and Peter Vincent	9 February 1998	12.14
When Richard asks the girls to clean his house, Dorien asks them to so some spying for her. Garth, meanwhile, is short of money. Should Tracey tell him his endowment policy has matured, or take Sharon's advice and spend it on a holiday?

=== Series 9 (1998) ===
No.	Title	Runtime	Directed by	Written by	Original release date	Viewers (millions)
97	"Ghost"	30 minutes	Terry Kinane	Geoff Rowley	16 November 1998	11.89
The heavily pregnant Tracey is fed up with Sharon's slobbish habits – in particular her tendency to leave all the kitchen drawers open. But Sharon insists she didn't leave the drawers open, and when things start to go bump in the night, Tracey becomes convinced they're sharing the house with a poltergeist; thus, the girls and Dorien hold a séance.
98	"Mummies and Daddies"	30 minutes	Terry Kinane	Sam Lawrence	23 November 1998	10.98
Tracey is shocked to hear that Garth has apparently abandoned ex-girlfriend Kimberley while she is pregnant. However, it turns out to be a misunderstanding and the two are soon reunited and then engaged. Meanwhile, Dorien needs to get to her boyfriend Richard’s before he returns home to find the malicious answer message she has left him, while Tina – a member of the team Maids of Ongar has trouble with her boyfriend and causes problems with the directors.
99	"Sunday"	30 minutes	Terry Kinane	Geoff Rowley	30 November 1998	11.22
To relieve their boredom, Sharon, Tracey and Dorien head off to an antique market. They drive into a deserted warehouse, and later find out that they have been locked in the car park and will not be released until next week. They are trapped, and the only escape route is via a particularly nasty gents' lavatory.
100	"Model"	30 minutes	Terry Kinane	Gary Lawson and John Phelps	7 December 1998	11.82
A security monitor zooms in on Sharon as she browses in a department store. A little later, a woman approaches her; not the store detective, but a scout for a modelling agency specialising in plus-size models. Tracey becomes envious, and Dorien appoints herself manager of 'Sharon T'.
101	"Nuptials"	30 minutes	Terry Kinane	Gary Lawson and John Phelps	14 December 1998	11.73
It is Kimberley and Garth's wedding day. Darryl's father gives Garth a £50 loan rather than a present, telling him to go away until he goes off the idea of marriage. The less impeccable side of Sharon and Tracey's family arrives in a minibus and Kimberley's mother complains throughout the wedding ceremony. Meanwhile, it’s Dorien’s 50th birthday – but feels old and lonely, and attempts to commit suicide.
Special
102	"Holy Ground"	40 minutes	Terry Kinane	Geoff Rowley	24 December 1998	8.74
A solicitor's letter reveals an unknown slice of family history for Sharon and Tracey. They decide to go with Dorien to Tipperary, Ireland, so they can find out more about the family and Dorien can visit her horse. The girls hear that Uncle Declan has just died. Unfortunately, the sisters arrive to find they have been left a field. Dorien is not happy either, when discovering her horse is a pregnant one. There's a surprise in store for Tracey as she gives birth in a stable.

=== Series 10 (2014) ===
No.	Title	Runtime	Directed by	Written by	Original release date	Viewers (millions)
103	"Gimme Shelter"	22 minutes	Nick Wood	Laurence Marks and Maurice Gran	2 January 2014	9.51
Sharon's living back in her council flat and Tracey's still in Chigwell with younger son Travis… but what's become of Dorien? What can bring the Birds back together? And who else might return to the nest?
104	"Slave"	22 minutes	Nick Wood	Gary Lawson and John Phelps	9 January 2014	8.61
Now that Sharon has given up work to skivvy for Dorien full-time, Tracey is the only one in the house bringing in a wage. It's not enough for Tracey to pay all the household bills, so Dorien offers to dip into her savings for some rent – but when she calls the bank, it emerges that everything she has is going in legal fees. In desperation, Sharon and Tracey decide to take Dorien to a car boot sale to raise some much-needed funds. They sell Dorien's beloved designer collection, right down to the shoes on her feet, which are bought by Amy Childs from The Only Way Is Essex. Garth has found a job in sandwich shop Seedy McCrusty's, and Sharon has agreed to go back to working the tills at discount store World of Quid, but it's not enough – Dorien has to get a job there!
105	"Hot Stuff"	22 minutes	Nick Wood	Laurence Marks and Maurice Gran	16 January 2014	6.61
Money and space are still tight – and now Tracey can’t ignore the fact that Garth and Marcie aren’t getting any "together time" – so it’s all change in the bedrooms again to give them space. After failing to sleep in the lounge, Sharon tries to bed down in the loft, where she makes an unexpected discovery that might solve all their problems.
106	"Hearts For Sale"	22 minutes	Dez McCarthy	Gary Lawson and John Phelps	23 January 2014	6.86
Tracey, Sharon and Dorien each get romantically involved with three very different men. Travis has romantic troubles of his own, and Garth and Marcie decide to raise money to refurbish their new pub by having a pop-up restaurant evening at Tracey’s, where everyone’s romantic ambitions are crushed...
107	"Tattoo You"	22 minutes	Dez McCarthy	Laurence Marks and Maurice Gran	30 January 2014	6.46
Everyone is complaining about Tracey’s miserable expression, which leads to her becoming self-conscious about her appearance. After being dumped by girlfriend Rosie, Travis chose a tattoo to show how much he loves her, much to Tracey's rage, however she is quickly exposed as a hypocrite after Dorien reveals Tracey has secretly resorted to Botox to improve her expression. Sharon is always turning up the television volume and asking people to repeat themselves – so when she goes to see the doctor, she discovers something shocking: she needs hearing aids.
108	"Blinded By Love"	22 minutes	Dez McCarthy	Gary Lawson and John Phelps	6 February 2014	6.04
Sharon’s estranged husband Chris gets in touch. He’s met someone new – a lady called Angie, who is friendly, vivacious, and blind. Chris wants to divorce Sharon so they can get married, but Tracey has her doubts. Dorien meets a handsome blind man at Chris and Angie’s engagement party; who takes a shine to her. (Note: reappearance of Chris Theodopolopodous played by original actor David Cardy.)
109	"Back to Zero"	22 minutes	Dez McCarthy	Laurence Marks and Maurice Gran	13 February 2014	6.02
Sharon, Tracey and Dorien all lose their jobs and the resulting financial crisis leads to a huge row. Some home truths are revealed and the three of them hit rock bottom. Meanwhile, thanks to a mystery celebrity Twitter endorsement, Garth and Marcie's pub has had a successful launch – meaning they're finally earning money.
110	"You Can't Always Get What You Want"	22 minutes	Dez McCarthy	Gary Lawson and John Phelps	6 March 2014	5.32
Sharon and Tracey get a glimpse of a possible future when they see two elderly sisters in the supermarket – which worries them. Dorien's court case comes to a conclusion – but what will the verdict be?

=== Series 11 (2014–15) ===
An eleventh series was announced in March 2014, the day of the previous series concluding. Filming took place at Pinewood Studios in October and November 2014.

No.	Title	Runtime	Directed by	Written by	Original release date	Viewers (millions)
Special
111	"Birds on a Plane"	22 minutes	Martin Dennis	Laurence Marks and Maurice Gran	26 December 2014	5.60
Dorien is treating Sharon and Tracey to a Christmas trip to the Canary Islands. With Sharon's old work friends and an overdramatic passenger also on board, the plane does not reach its destination...
Series
112	"There's Something About Sharon"	22 minutes	Martin Dennis	Gary Lawson and John Phelps	1 January 2015	4.91
Dorien is told her next book must be about spying. She then gets the idea that Sharon could be the heroine for her next book if she gets a job at MI5. When Sharon finds out a big argument takes place before Sharon gets her own back on Dorien. Tracey has her hands full with a despondent Garth.
113	"Guess Who's Coming to Essex?"	22 minutes	Martin Dennis	Laurence Marks and Maurice Gran	8 January 2015	4.19
While sorting through her fan mail, Dorien discovers a letter which she throws in the bin. Sharon decides to read what it was and her and Tracey are shocked to discover that Dorien has been keeping a secret for 50 years.
114	"The Girls with the Pearl Buttons"	22 minutes	Martin Dennis	Gary Lawson and John Phelps	15 January 2015	4.63
Tracey and Sharon have both been nominated by Auntie Vera to take over her Pearly Queen title. It's war as they try to outdo each other. meanwhile, Dorian tries to bond with her long-lost daughter Naomi, but upon learning she is a vicar, she fears they have nothing in common.
115	"Tracey's Choice"	22 minutes	Martin Dennis	Susan Nickson	22 January 2015	3.88
Dorien's Book Group is convening to discuss Crime and Punishment – which turns out to be rather applicable to the events that unfold in Tracey's household after Travis gets arrested.
116	"The Chief, The Cook, His Mum and Her Lodger"	22 minutes	Martin Dennis	Laurence Marks and Maurice Gran	29 January 2015	4.38
With Tracey in prison, Sharon has been knocking the household into shape in her absence, and meanwhile Dorien is spending money like it's going out of fashion. So ends up having to work for Sharon at the local school kitchen along with Tracey.
117	"Without a Trace"	22 minutes	Martin Dennis	Gary Lawson and John Phelps	5 February 2015	4.18
Sharon makes plans to take Tracey and Dorien on a madcap 70s weekender, but there is no dressing up the news that Tracey is about to receive.
118	"Spa Wars"	22 minutes	Martin Dennis	Gary Lawson and John Phelps	12 February 2015	4.12
Tracey and Sharon take a trip to a Spa to cope with Tracey's shattering news and try to make plans for the future: and Dorien prepares to say a long goodbye to her daughter.

=== Series 12 (2016) ===
No.	Title	Runtime	Directed by	Written by	Original release date	Viewers (millions)
119	"Knocking on Heaven's Door"	22 minutes	Martin Dennis	Laurence Marks and Maurice Gran	7 January 2016	5.34
When Darryl dies, Tracey has to decide what kind of a send-off to give him. Sharon wants it to be nice for the boys, Dorien has the perfect outfit, and Chigwell's criminal fraternity want to make it special.
120	"Too Much of Nothing"	22 minutes	Martin Dennis	Laurence Marks and Maurice Gran	14 January 2016	5.84
During Darryl's funeral, Tracey's house is burgled. The family decide it is up to them to track down their possessions and set out on a trail involving a snooker club, a pawnbroker and the infamous Theydon Boys drag club.
121	"Tombstone Blues"	22 minutes	Martin Dennis	Laurence Marks, Maurice Gran and Susan Nickson	21 January 2016	5.43
Sharon's disapproval of Tracey dating policeman Barry and apparently overlooking Garth's feelings for his dad lead to a major quarrel between the sisters. Is it one that Dorien, in her new role as Agony Aunt for Get-A-Life Magazine, can solve?
122	"Going, Going, Gone"	22 minutes	Martin Dennis	Gary Lawson and John Phelps	28 January 2016	5.55
Tracey's had enough of Dorien entertaining gentlemen callers and Sharon not bringing in a living wage, and throws them both out. Holed up in Sharon's old bedsit, the two of them take a united stand...or do they?
123	"Tonight I'll Be Staying Here With You"	22 minutes	Martin Dennis	Gary Lawson and John Phelps	4 February 2016	4.21
Auntie Vera has problems with her hips and her block's defective lifts so tells Sharon and Tracey she's moving in with them. But Tracey has only one room available: it's Dorien's... and Dorien is dismayed to be told that family comes first.
124	"Abandoned Love"	22 minutes	Martin Dennis	Gary Lawson and John Phelps	11 February 2016	4.20
A surprise visitor in the form of the attractive Emma turns up at Tracey's house. Sharon's suspicious, Tracey is welcoming, and Dorien is shocked to the core. Travis, on the other hand, is over the moon.
125	"Blonde on Blonde"	22 minutes	Martin Dennis	Gary Lawson and John Phelps	18 February 2016	5.19
Travis has serious school news that he's scared to break to his mum. Sharon decides she'll pass herself off as Tracey and sort out his problems, but her efforts land the family in a mess that only arch-seducer Dorien can get them out of.
126	"Forever Young"	22 minutes	Martin Dennis	Laurence Marks and Maurice Gran	25 February 2016	4.39
Sharon and Tracey suspect that Dorien is fast approaching "The Big Seven-0", and decide that, whether she likes it or not, the event calls for celebration.
Special
127	"There's a Girl in My Souk"	45 minutes	Martin Dennis	Laurence Marks, Maurice Gran, Gary Lawson and John Phelps	24 December 2016	4.46
Tracey's son Travis mysteriously vanishes in Tangiers, Morocco during his gap year – so the girls fly out to find him. Will they be back in Chigwell for Christmas?

=== Christmas Special (2017) ===
No.	Title	Runtime	Directed by	Written by	Original release date	Viewers (millions)
128	"The House for the Rising Sons"	45 minutes	Martin Dennis	Laurence Marks, Maurice Gran, Gary Lawson and John Phelps	18 December 2017	4.83
It’s Christmas in Chigwell and the Birds are back. Tracey has big plans that could upset the festive harmony in the house, Sharon has found a novel way of doing her Christmas shopping and Dorien has a mystery to solve. What could possibly go wrong? Elsewhere, Garth decides to help the homeless after meeting an attractive homeless busker (guest star Emily Atack), and Travis' new career choice puts him in a difficult place, with Sharon's new shopping method and the family's criminal heritage.: Final appearances of Sharon Theodopolopodous (Pauline Quirke), Garth Stubbs (Samuel James) and Travis Stubbs (Charlie Quirke)

=== Christmas Special (2020) ===
No.	Title	Runtime	Directed by	Written by	Original release date	Viewers (millions)
129	"We Gotta Get Out of This Place"	30 minutes	Ben Gosling Fuller	Laurence Marks, Maurice Gran, Gary Lawson and John Phelps	24 December 2020	3.01
Tracey and Dorien have been getting right on each other's thruppennies during lockdown, not helped by Dorien's insistence on inviting her new boyfriend around (guest star Les Dennis), Sharon stuck abroad in Costa Rica and unable to get home, and the arrival of one of Tracey's former cellmates who inadvertently raises the spirit of their missing housemate...: This is the only episode not to feature Sharon Theodopolopodous (Pauline Quirke), although she could be seen in archive footage. This is also the last ever Christmas episode of Birds of a Feather.

== Broadcast ==
The first series, of six episodes, aired from 16 October to 20 November 1989 on Mondays at 8:30 pm. A Christmas special aired on 26 December 1989 at 9:00 pm. The second series aired for fifteen episodes from 6 September to 13 December 1990 on Thursdays at 8:30 pm, followed by a Christmas Special on Boxing Day at 8:20 pm.

The twelve-episode third series aired from 31 August to 16 November 1991 on Saturdays at 8:00 pm, followed by a Christmas special on Christmas Day at 8:00 pm. The fourth series, of thirteen episodes, aired from 6 September to 29 November 1992 on Sundays at 8:40 pm, with a Christmas Day special at 8:00 pm. Series five for thirteen episodes on Sundays at 8:20 pm from 5 September to 28 November 1993, with a Christmas Special on 25 December 1993 at 8:00 pm.

The sixth series aired from 18 September to 18 December 1994, for twelve episodes, on Sundays at 7:30 pm. A Christmas Special followed on 24 December at 8:55 pm. A special flashback episode, "The Chigwell Years", was broadcast on Sunday 3 March 1996. It is now regarded as part of the seventh series. After a three-year hiatus, ten-episode seventh series aired from 26 May to 28 July 1997 on Mondays at 9:30 pm, with a Christmas special on 27 December 1997 at 9:25 pm.

The eighth series aired from 5 January to 9 February 1998, on Mondays at 8:30 pm, for six episodes. The ninth series, also of six episodes, aired from 16 November to 24 December 1998, mostly on Mondays at 8:30 pm. The tenth series began on 2 January 2014 on ITV, consisting of 8 episodes, airing at 8:30 pm. The first episode gave the network its highest ratings for a comedy drama in 14 years attracting 8 million.

Series 10 (the first on ITV) aired from 2 January to 6 March 2014. ITV renewed Birds of a Feather for Series 11 (the second on ITV), which aired from 26 December 2014 to 12 February 2015. A twelfth series had been commissioned (the third for ITV) which aired on 7 January to 25 February 2016.

As of 2020, there have been a total of 129 episodes. 95 are 30 minutes long and 24 are 22 minutes long. The 1990 Christmas special was 75 minutes, the 1993 Christmas special was 60 minutes long, while the 1991, 1992, 1994 and 1997 Christmas specials were 50 minutes in duration. The final BBC episode, which aired on Christmas Eve 1998, was 40 minutes long. The 2016 Christmas special on ITV was 45 minutes long and the 2017 Christmas special on ITV was also 45 minutes long. The 2020 Christmas special was 30 minutes long.

== Other media ==
On 15 March 1991, Birds of a Feather and sketch series French and Saunders did a short crossover skit for Comic Relief in which Jennifer Saunders and Dawn French imitate Sharon and Tracey when they arrive at their house as cleaners.

On 19 December 2014, a short sketch was screened as part of ITV's Text Santa which featured Paul O'Grady as Santa Claus. It was watched by 3.86 million viewers.

== Ratings ==
Birds of a Feather : UK viewers per episode (millions)

Season	Episode number															Average
Season	1	2	3	4	5	6	7	8	9	10	11	12	13	14	15	Average
1	12.02	13.03	12.13	12.54	12.93	12.52	–									12.53
2	8.51	10.46	10.55	10.09	10.63	10.57	12.08	12.68	12.86	12.98	12.45	13.39	12.88	12.90	12.68	11.71
3	9.59	11.36	10.79	11.85	10.97	9.57	12.40	12.40	12.85	12.37	12.27	14.36	–			11.73
4	12.33	11.33	10.52	11.20	11.29	11.67	10.99	12.21	12.41	12.74	13.08	12.78	12.25	–		11.91
5	13.76	14.72	14.56	11.59	11.56	11.33	10.94	11.07	11.79	10.92	11.41	11.86	11.67	–		12.09
6	8.74	8.37	8.85	8.93	10.16	9.67	10.41	10.28	9.44	10.62	9.76	12.78	11.14	–		9.93
7	9.85	8.12	8.33	8.15	8.35	8.30	7.60	7.76	7.48	6.74	–					8.07
8	11.31	11.64	13.30	13.21	10.98	12.14	–									12.10
9	11.89	10.98	11.22	11.82	11.73	–										11.53
10	9.51	8.61	6.61	6.86	6.46	6.04	6.02	5.32	–							6.93
11	4.91	4.19	4.63	3.88	4.38	4.18	4.12	–								4.33
12	5.34	5.84	5.43	5.55	4.21	4.20	5.19	4.39	–							5.02

Audience measurement performed by Broadcasters' Audience Research Board
