= Spacevets =

- Genre: Science fiction / Comedy / Children's television series
- Created by: Stephen Edmondson; Jerome Vincent
- Starring: Mark Arden; Ann Bryson; Robin Kingsland; Linden Kirk; Bernard Wright
- Country of origin: United Kingdom
- Original language: English
- No. of seasons: 3
- No. of episodes: 39

Original release
- Network: BBC One
- Release: 29 September 1992 – 20 December 1994

Spacevets is a 39-episode children's sci-fi show about a motley crew of misfit intergalactic space vets, broadcast from 1992 to 1994. The concept was devised by Stephen Edmondson and Jerome Vincent, but the characters were created by writer Christopher Middleton, and most of the 39 episodes written by him, too. Music for the series was produced by former Doctor Who composer Dominic Glynn.

== Premise ==
They travel the cosmos in the spaceship Dispensable helping alien life forms in need, and transporting "The Meeloue" the rarest and most precious star in the universe, which when you place your hand on it will release a holographic string of words saying what you're thinking.

== Cast ==
- Mark Arden as Captain Skip Chip
- Ann Bryson as Mona (The Receptionist)
- Bernard Wright as No. 2
- Robin Kingsland as Dogsbody
- Linden Kirk as Captain K. Pubble
- William Mannering, as Captain (series 2)

== History ==
The television show had 39 episodes over three seasons. Each episode was 15 minutes. The first season ran from 29 September 1992 to 22 December 1992, the second season ran from 28 September 1993 to 21 December 1993, and the third season ran from 27 September 1994 to 6 December 1994.

== Home media ==
One known VHS release was made of the series, it had five episodes from the second series of the show, including: 'The Shrunken Brain', 'Riddle of the Sands And Caves of Doom', 'Menace of the Machines' and 'Sunday Rotten Sunday'.

== Reception ==
In a positive review, the historian Mark Lewisohn praised Spacevets, writing, "An above-average entry in the children's sitcom genre, with a witty script and interesting characters and situations. Like a cross between All Creatures Great And Small and Red Dwarf, Spacevets had a classy look and a neat set that belied its relatively small budget."
