= The Steal (film) =

1995 film by John Hay

The Steal is a 1995 British comedy thriller film directed by John Hay and starring Alfred Molina, Helen Slater and Peter Bowles. The film was released by Warner Bros. in the United Kingdom on six screens on 5 May 1995.

== Plot ==
London human rights lawyer Jeremiah Harper recruits American computer technician and hacker Kim, hoping to get even with a property development company who have cheated some poor islanders out of their land in Golanda, southwestern Asia. He tasks her to drain their accounts so he can return the bulk of the money to the people there.

Cliff, who is a planner for the town council, is recruited to act as Kim's fiancé to scout the targeted private bank, Watson Tyler. She needs to be able to set up rerouting of bank transfers. Beforehand, she creates them false identities.

Meeting with bank manager Wimbourne, they see the portrait of bank chairman Lord Childwell. They are shown around the premises, so Kim is able to locate the mainframe computer and bank transfer desks.

Kim had hoped to hack into the bank's system remotely, but as Cliff is a building planner he realises the part of the bank they need to access is a recent addition. They can therefore access it through underground storm drains that empty into the river.

As they only can reroute live transfers, and low tide is on Friday, Jeremiah suggests they try to trigger a rumor to encourage investors to move their money quickly. His idea is that Cliff and Kim abduct Lord Childwell, so they can pose him in photos to blackmail him into starting a run.

Through a comedy of errors, Cliff and Kim barely manage to kidnap Childwell and get compromising photos of him with a poodle. However, with the help of Sir Wilmot, whose land they leave him on, Childwell is able to find the perpetrators. Wilmot helps him find the make of van they transported him in, then retraces their route.

Arriving to Cliff's, he and Kim book it in the red van, with Childwell and Wilmot chasing close behind. They manage to lose them, then get to the storm drain at low tide. Although their blackmail scheme is out the window, Kim says they should go ahead and try.

Meanwhile, Jeremiah has caught up with Childwell and Wilmot. He shows them the before and after shots of Golanda, inspiring Childwell to contact some of the bank's larger clients. They pull out over 30 million pounds, which Kim intercepts. Cliff and Kim are able to leave their lives behind, and move together to a tropical paradise. 28 million is sent to compensate Golanda so it can heal.

== Cast ==
- Alfred Molina - Cliff
- Helen Slater - Kim
- Peter Bowles - Lord Childwell
- Dinsdale Landen - Sir Wilmot
- Heathcote Williams - Jeremiah
- Stephen Fry - Wimborne
- Bryan Pringle - Cecil, Bank Doorman
- Patricia Hayes - Mrs Fawkes
- Jack Dee - Wilmot's Servant
- Ian Porter - Beggar
- Lindsay Holiday - Jimmy
- Ann Bryson - Bank Transfer Clerk
- Sara Crowe - Bank Transfer Secretary
- Gabrielle Drake - Anthea

== Release ==
The film grossed £4,012 in its opening weekend in the United Kingdom.
