= Rebecca Lacey =

English actress (born 1965)

- Born: Rebecca Jane Lacey; 20 April 1965 (age 61); Watford, Hertfordshire, England
- Years active: 1981–present
- Spouse: Paul Harrison
- Children: 2
- Father: Ronald Lacey

Rebecca Jane Lacey (born 20 April 1965) is an English actress. She is best known for playing Dr. George Woodman in Casualty and Hilary in May to December and for her stage work in the West End and The RSC.

== Early life ==
She was born in Watford, Hertfordshire, the daughter of actor Ronald Lacey and actress Mela White.

== Career ==
Lacey is best known for her roles as Irene Stuart (series 4) in Monarch of the Glen, the feisty Dr George Woodman in Casualty (having previously made two guest appearances in the series as patients in 1991 and 1994), and ditzy but kind-hearted Hilary in May to December. She has also played a number of roles in The Bill and many other TV series.

In 1992 she appeared in the film Carry On Columbus and followed it up in 1995 with an appearance in the BBC/WGBH comedy drama adapted from Heavy Weather by P.G. Wodehouse and starring Peter O'Toole as Lord Emsworth. She has appeared in a number of theatre productions including a season with Alan Ayckbourn in Terry Johnson's Dead Funny in the West End and Amy's View by David Hare. From 2012 to 2013, she portrayed Laura Tyler in the BBC soap opera Doctors.

== Filmography ==
=== Television ===
- The Bill 1984 ("It's Not Such a Bad Job After All") - video shop assistant
- Shine on Harvey Moon 1984 ("Fools Rush In") - Gloria Pelham
- Mann's Best Friends (1985) - Receptionist
- Starting Out 1986 (To Be or Not to Be) - Maggie Robertson
- Lovejoy 1986 ("To Sleep No More") - Receptionist
- Home to Roost 1986–89 (3 episodes) - Julie Willows
- The Bretts 1987 (various episodes) - Emily
- News at Twelve 1988 (various episodes) - Sharon Doyle
- The Bill 1989 ("Street Games and Board Games") - Debbie
- Hannay 1989 ("The Confidence Man") - Florence Peterson
- May to December 1989–93 (Series 1-5) - Hilary
- The Darling Buds of May 1993 (2 episodes) - Marion Winters
- Comedy Firsts 1995 (The Smiths) - Carol Smith
- Game On ("Bad Timing") 1995 - Claudia
- A Touch of Frost 1996 ("Fun Times for Swingers") - Anne-Marie Pearce
- The Bill 1997 ("Once Bitten") - Diane Holloway
- Casualty 1997-99 (various episodes) - Dr Georgina 'George' Woodman
- Badger 1999 (various episodes) - RSPB Officer Claire Armitage
- Murder in Mind 2002 ("Memories") - Jenny Wilsher
- Monarch of the Glen 2004 (Series 4 eps 1-8) - Irene
- Murder in Suburbia 2004 ("Millionaire's Row") - Hannah Finch
- M.I.T.: Murder Investigation Team 2005 (series 2 episode 3) - Ruth Baxter
- Heartbeat 2005 ("Blast From The Past") - Louise Parry
- Hustle 2005 ("Confessions") - Juliette Keyes
- The Bill 2007 (episode 475) - Shiela Morgan
- Waterloo Road 2009-2011 (Series 5-6) - Dina Robbinson
- Doctors 2013 - Laura Tyler
- New Tricks 2015 ("The Wolf of Wallbrook") - Cindy
- Endeavour 2017 S4 E2 Canticle
- Rellik 2017 Gabriel's therapist
- Doc Martin 2017 (S8 E4) - Tara Newcross
- Call the Midwife 2021 (S10 E4) - Rita Leeks
- Grantchester 2022 (S7 E2) - Betty Rose

=== Film ===
- Carry On Columbus 1992 - Chiquita
- Heavy Weather BBC, 1995 - Sue Brown
- Arthur's Dyke 2001 - Phillipa
- Chalet Girl 2011 - Thea Matthews

== Other work ==
- Narrator - Anne Of Austria 1998 (Chivers Audio Books)
- Narrator - The Exorcist (BBC Everyman)
- Numerous TV adverts (O2, McVities, Tropicana, Oral B, The Sunday Times, Canon, KLM)

== Plays ==
- Elmire - Tartuffe (2011) (English Touring Theatre)
- Sheila - Benefactors (2012) (Sheffield Theatres)
- Mrs Bennett - Pride and Prejudice (2013) (Regent's Park Open Air Theatre)
- Siobhan - The Curious Incident of the Dog in the Nighttime (2015) (Gielgud Theatre, London)
- Patricia - Merit (2015) (Royal Theatre, Plymouth)
- Margaret Hyman - Broken Glass (2018) (Watford Palace)
- Mistress Page - The Merry Wives Of Windsor (2018) (Royal Shakespeare company)
- Sonia - Vanya and Sonia and Marsha and Spike (2019) (Bath Theatre Royal), (2021) (Charing Cross Theatre)
- The Ghost of Christmas Past - A Christmas Carol (2022/23) (Royal Shakespeare Company)
