= Sara Crowe =

Scottish actress (born 1966)

- Born: 22 March 1966 (age 60); Irvine, Ayrshire, Scotland
- Occupation: Actress
- Years active: 1987–present
- Spouses: Toby Dale (m. 1992; div. 1998) Sean Carson (m. 2003)

Sara Crowe (born 22 March 1966) is a Scottish film and stage actress who mainly plays comedy roles.

== Biography ==
=== Career ===
After beginning her career on stage and in television, Crowe began to take film roles, including a part in Carry On Columbus and as the 'first bride' Laura in the comedy film Four Weddings and a Funeral. Her West End appearances include Private Lives, Twelfth Night, Hay Fever and The Constant Wife and, on tour, Acorn Antiques the Musical and Alan Ayckbourn's Absurd Person Singular.

She is a regular performer (and part of the original cast) of the touring play Seven Deadly Sins Four Deadly Sinners. She gained notice in the United Kingdom in a series of TV advertisements for Philadelphia cream cheese spread in the 1990s, playing a dizzy blonde secretary with Ann Bryson as her friend. With Bryson, she also formed the comedy duo Flaming Hamsters; they co-starred in the 1995 film The Steal and the 1996 sitcom Sometime Never.

She appeared in the 2010 British feature film version of Tony Hawks's best selling book, Round Ireland with a Fridge. In 2012 she appeared in St. John's Night (1853) by Henrik Ibsen at London's Jermyn Street Theatre.

Crowe has starred as Queen Thistle and also as Mrs Witch in the television programme Ben and Holly's Little Kingdom. She briefly appeared in the BBC soap series EastEnders in 2013, playing the character of Sheila Morris. She played Sarah Arscott in the ghost story Martin's Close for the BBC (2019).

Crowe is Patron of Guildford-based educational, cultural and social community hub, The Guildford Institute.

== Writing ==
Crowe's first novel, Campari for Breakfast, was published by Doubleday in April 2014. Her second novel Martini Henry was published in 2016 by Doubleday.

== Personal life ==
Crowe was married to Toby Dale, the son of Jim Dale, from July 1992 until 1998. Since 2003, she has been married to Sean Carson.

== Awards ==
=== 1990 ===
- Olivier Award for Best Supporting Actress
- Variety Club Best Actress Award
- Critics Circle Theatre Award for Most Promising Newcomer (performance in Private Lives)
- Nominated for Olivier Award for Best Comedy Performance for Hay Fever

== Filmography ==
Year	Title	Role	Notes
1986−1987	Now, Something Else	Various	12 episodes
1987	Boogie Outlaws`	Sally	2 episodes
1988	Carrott Confidential	Unknown	Episode: "Episode #2.1"
1988	Hot Metal	Blue Peter Presenter	Episode: "The Twilight Zone"
1988	The Rory Bremner Show	Various	6 episodes
1988	Square Deal	Fiona	Episode: "Episode #1.7"
1989−1992	Smith & Jones	Various	4 episodes
1990	Home to Roost	Cherry Gibson	Episode: "High Noon"
1990	Haggard	Fanny	5 episodes
1990	KYTV	Debbie	Episode: "Challenge Anna"
1990	Freddie and Max	Claire	Episode: "Episode #1.1"
1991	Roy's Raiders	Daisy	6 episodes
1992	The Good Guys	Christine Draper	Episode: "Verschwinden"
1992	Harry Enfield's Television Programme	Mummy Bunny	2 episodes
1992	Carry On Columbus	Fatima	
1993	The Thief and the Cobbler	Princess YumYum (voice)	1992 workprint
1994	Funky Black Shorts	Joely Darlington	Episode: "The Godsend"
1994	Four Weddings and a Funeral	Laura the Bride - Wedding One	
1994	Scarlett	Lulie Harris	Episode: "Episode #1.1"
1995	The Steal	Bank Transfer Secretary	
1995	The Best of Rory Bremner	Unknown	Video
1995−1996	Sometime, Never	Max	8 episodes
1997	Caught in the Act	Lucinda	
2001	Big Meg, Little Meg	Margaret Johnson #2	7 episodes
2002	Born and Bred	Sally Waddington	Episode: "Judgement Day"
2004	Casualty	Kerry Summerston	Episode: "Don't Go There"
2005	The Green Green Grass	Tamara	Episode: "One Flew Over the Cuckoo Clock"
2006	Mayo	Laura Willard	Episode: "Late of This Parish"
2007	Living with Two People You Like Individually...But Not as a Couple	Lyn	Television film
2009	Skins	Hair & Beauty Teacher	Episode: "Everyone"
2009−2013	Ben and Holly's Little Kingdom	Queen Thistle / Lucy's Mum / Mrs. Witch	50 episodes
2010	Round Ireland with a Fridge	Nicola	
2010−2016	Doctors	Mrs. Lowick / Sarah Blasdale	2 episodes
2013	Eastenders	Sheila Morris	2 episodes
2017	Midsomer Murders	Ailsa Benson	Episode: "Red in Tooth and Claw"
2019	One Red Nose Day and a Wedding	Laura	Television short
2019	Martin's Close	Sarah Arscott	Television film
2021	Adventurous	Ros	
2021	A Splinter of Ice	Rufa Philby	
2021	Going the Distance	Em	Television film
