= Ramsay Gilderdale =

English actor

- Born: Ramsey Wilson Gilderdale; 5 August 1962 (age 62); Wakefield, West Riding of Yorkshire, England
- Occupation: actor
- Website: http://www.gilderdale.co.uk

Ramsey Wilson Gilderdale (born 5 August 1962), professionally known as Ramsay Gilderdale, is an English actor, best known for playing Guy of Gisbourne in BBC children's television comedy Maid Marian and Her Merry Men from 1990 to 1994. He also appeared in Rumpole of the Bailey and Blackadder's Christmas Carol.

As a screenwriter, he has also worked on Barbara and ChuckleVision. He was a storyliner on the Cuthbert Lilly sketches for ZZZap!.

He is also a director of Modicasa, an Italian company specialising in "sales, holiday rentals and property management and services" in and around Modica in southern Sicily.

Ramsay is a graduate of the University of Nottingham. During his time there he was active in the Student Drama Society ("Dramsoc") and appeared in a production of The Changeling (Middleton and Rowley).
