= Samuel James =

English actor and voiceover artist (born 1977)

- Born: Mark James Harrison; 28 March 1977 (age 49); Portsmouth, Hampshire, England
- Occupations: Actor; voiceover artist
- Years active: 2002–present
- Television: Casualty (2007, 2012); EastEnders (2011–2012, 2017); Birds of a Feather (2014–2017)

Mark James Harrison (born 28 March 1977), known professionally as Samuel James, is an English actor and voiceover artist, known for portraying the role of Garth Stubbs in the ITV sitcom Birds of a Feather from 2014 to 2017. He has also starred in Casualty and EastEnders.

== Career ==
=== Theatre ===
James is an experienced theatre actor and singer, having appeared in the 2002 West End musical production of The Full Monty (adapted from the 1997 film of the same name) as Malcolm and as Houdini in the original London production of the Broadway musical Ragtime. He also played the cowardly lion in The Wizard of Oz at Birmingham Repertory Theatre.

He has twice performed at The National Theatre: in Women Beware Women, directed by Marianne Elliott and as Fabian in Twelfth Night (starring Rebecca Hall and directed by her father, Sir Peter Hall).

In 2007, James starred as Todd in the World premiere of Stockholm, a new play by Bryony Lavery. The production opened at The Drum Theatre, Plymouth before embarking on a critically acclaimed UK tour, eventually garnering a Best Touring Production nomination at the 2008 TMA Awards.

James returned to The Drum Theatre in 2009 to play the part of Ratineau in Carl Grose's new play, Grand Guignol, directed by Simon Stokes.

In 2011 he appeared in Headlong Theatre's Decade, a site specific production marking the 10th anniversary of the 11 September 2001 attacks. Directed by Rupert Goold and featuring a 20 strong writing team including Abi Morgan, John Logan and Mike Bartlett; the "brilliant theatrical installation" ran from 1 September to 11 October at the former site of London's World Trade Centre, St Katharine Docks.

In 2013 James played Tony in Mike Leigh's Abigail's Party, with former Eastenders star Hannah Waterman as Beverly and Martin Marquez as Lawrence.

Later in 2013 he played Nick in Fault Lines, a new comedy written by Ali Taylor. Set in the offices of a fictional disaster relief charity, the play opened on 5 December at Hampstead Theatre and was directed by Lisa Spirling. Nichola McAuliffe and Alex Lawther also starred.

=== Television ===
James' television credits include Battle of Britain, The Bill, Rose and Maloney, Poirot and New Worlds.

In 2007 he played Russ Golden in two episodes of Casualty before returning to the show in 2012 to play Pat Paddon for a further two episodes.

He played Marshall in Hugo Blick's The Shadow Line, a BBC Two mini-series aired in 2011. From May 2011 to December 2012, he played Phil Mitchell's (Steve McFadden's) lawyer Jimmie Broome in the BBC soap opera EastEnders.

Since December 2014, James has played the role of Garth Stubbs in the revived ITV sitcom Birds of a Feather, replacing Matt Willis. He currently stars alongside Linda Robson, Pauline Quirke, Lesley Joseph and Charlie Quirke. He also starred in the 2014 Text Santa special which guest starred Paul O'Grady. A third revived series was announced in March 2015, and began airing in January 2016 for eight episodes.

In 2025 James played Steven Poyser the head of prosecution in the Lauren Bolton case on ITV Coronation Street.

== Filmography ==
Year	Title	Role	Notes
2007, 2012	Casualty	Russ Golden / Pat Paddon	Guest: 4 Episodes
2011	The Shadow Line	Marshall	Guest: 1 Episode
2011–2012, 2017	EastEnders	Jimmie Broome	Recurring Role
2014–2017	Birds of a Feather	Garth Stubbs	Main Cast
2023	Coronation Street	Steven Poyser	Guest Role
