= Ann Bryson =

British actress

- Born: 4 October 1964 (age 61)
- Occupation: Actress

Ann Bryson (born 4 October 1964) is a British actress who is best known for featuring in the television series Days Like These, Sometime, Never and Spacevets, and Philadelphia cream cheese adverts with Sara Crowe, with whom she also formed the comedy duo Flaming Hamsters. Both actresses also appeared together as bank secretaries in the 1995 film The Steal.
