= Sometime, Never =

British TV sitcom (1995–96)

- Genre: Sitcom
- Written by: Jenny Lecoat
- Directed by: Baz Taylor (Pilot); Sylvie Boden (Series)
- Starring: Sara Crowe; Ann Bryson; Paul Chapman
- Theme music composer: Stefan Girardet
- Country of origin: United Kingdom
- Original language: English
- No. of series: 1
- No. of episodes: 8

Production
- Executive producer: Allan McKeown
- Producers: Tony Charles (Pilot); Jamie Rix (Series)
- Running time: 30 minutes
- Production companies: Central Television (1995); WitzEnd Productions for Meridian Broadcasting (1996)

Original release
- Network: ITV
- Release: 17 July 1995 – 8 December 1996

Sometime, Never is a British television sitcom produced by WitzEnd Productions for Meridian Broadcasting and transmitted on the ITV network with an initial pilot episode on 17 July 1995 by Central Television, and the full series follows between 27 October and 8 December 1996.

Written and created by Jenny Lecoat, the series about the disappointing reality of adult life for the late baby-boomer generation, once promised every idyll for which they could wish.

== Cast ==
- Sara Crowe – Maxine Bailey (Series 0–1)
- Ann Bryson – Bernice (Series 0–1)
- Paul Chapman – Harry
- Harry Burton – Ian (Series 0–1)
- Lucinda Fisher – Louise Kilgarith (Series 0–1)
- Sean Carnegie – Jason Williams (Series 0–1)
- John Hodgkinson – Kev
- Guy Witcher – St. John (Series 1 episode 3)

== Series overview ==
Series	Episodes	Originally released	
Series	Episodes	First released	Last released
Pilot	1	17 July 1995	
1	7	27 October 1996	8 December 1996

== Episodes ==
=== Pilot (1995) ===
No. overall	No. in series	Title	Directed by	Written by	Original release date
1	-	"Pilot"	Baz Taylor	Jenny Lecoat	17 July 1995
It is her 30th birthday and she reflects on her life and wonders what happened to the sophisticated, stylish woman she imagined she would grow up to be. She turns to her best friend Bernice for comfort, but finds she has opened the cooking sherry.

=== Series 1 (1996) ===
No. overall	No. in series	Title	Directed by	Written by	Original release date
2	1	"Fools Rush In..."	Sylvie Boden	Jenny Lecoat	27 October 1996
Max, a drama teacher, lives in the flat underneath Bernie's family home. Max prepares for a job interview, but the headmaster gives the job to a younger woman. Her boyfriend forgets their anniversary. She feels life is passing her by and resolves to change her personality.
3	2	"Trust in Me"	Sylvie Boden	Jenny Lecoat	3 November 1996
When Max's flat is burgled she changes her liberal principles and begins to suspect her pupils. Max decides to make a clean break with her boyfriend Ian, but gets carried away and spends the night with him. Bernice gives Max her new CD player, they put on some loud music and cannot hear Kev knocking on the window. He knocks too hard and falls through.
4	3	"Respect"	Sylvie Boden	Jenny Lecoat	10 November 1996
Bernice's son, Thomas, has been eavesdropping while Max and Bernice are being rude about Louise. Thomas repeats what he heard at school, and Louise calls in his mother to complain. Meanwhile, Max accepts Ian's invitation to dinner, but he upsets her and she storms out, insulting his guests. Thomas is told that as punishment for his behaviour, he can't make the dragon's head for the school play, but Louise is horrified when the dragon appears at the school play and has been made to look just like her.
5	4	"Getting Results"	Sylvie Boden	Jenny Lecoat	17 November 1996
Max is exhausted after cleaning her flat in preparation for her mother, Annette's, visit. Annette announces her marriage is over, and Max lets her stay.
6	5	"Bad Behaviour"	Sylvie Boden	Jenny Lecoat	24 November 1996
When Max and Bernice are shopping they spot Max's ex-boyfriend, Ian, with his new girlfriend. Max is jealous and decides to invite him to the PTA party. Bernice uses the party as an excuse to rekindle her marriage, but her efforts come to nothing. Louise's boyfriend tells her she is frigid, she rushes to the party and rips off her top in front of the headmaster.
7	6	"The Green Green Grass of Home"	Sylvie Boden	Jenny Lecoat	1 December 1996
Bernice decides she would like a job, and Max wants to have children with Ian. Max volunteers to look after Bernice's children with Ian while Bernice works as a barmaid. Max thinks she may be pregnant, but her experiences looking after the children have not been good. Bernice has a disastrous evening at work and is given the sack. Max finds out she is not pregnant and when Bernice returns home they both celebrate.
8	7	"Goodbye"	Sylvie Boden	Jenny Lecoat	8 December 1996
Ian has been offered a new job in Canada and Max agrees to go with him. At her leaving party Bernice gives her a leaving present and Max breaks down and tells Ian she doesn't want to go.
