= Benedict Sandiford =

British actor (born 1973)

- Born: 1973 (age 52–53); Newark-on-Trent
- Occupations: Actor and Teacher

Benedict Sandiford is a British actor who is best known for his role as son Neil on the British sitcom Barbara and for 'Harry Enfield & Chums' in 1997. He also made guest appearances on Heartbeat, Peak Practice, A Touch of Frost, Touching Evil, At Home with the Braithwaites, Pie in the Sky, Cadfael, This Life, Foyle's War, Midsomer Murders and Coronation Street.

He played rent boy Alfred Wood in the 1997 film Wilde, alongside Stephen Fry and Jude Law, and starred in the TV drama "Eskimo Day" and its sequel "Cold Enough For Snow", both penned by Jack Rosenthal and also starring Maureen Lipman, Tom Wilkinson, Anna Carteret and David Ross.

His theatre credits include: Falling Over England (Greenwich Theatre), The Schoolmistress (Chichester Festival Theatre), Spring and Port Wine, The Grouch, Cat on a Hot Tin Roof (West Yorkshire Playhouse), Kafka's Dick (Watford Palace Theatre), Restoration (Salisbury Playhouse), Lady in the Van (Hull Truck and UK Tour).

Sandiford is now an Artist in Residence at South Street Arts Centre in Reading, where he has made 8 original pieces of theatre: Jacksons Corner, Kaspar, The Final Whistle, The Great British Bump Off, Being Gordon Greenidge, In Ruins, Amelia, and Behind Closed Doors.

He now works at Reading School as Head of Drama, where he teaches GCSE drama and A-level Theatre Studies. However, he has left reading school in 2026 due to reasons outside of his work outside of reading school - reading school student
