= Barbara (TV series) =

British TV sitcom (1995–2003)

- Genre: Sitcom
- Created by: Mark Bussell; Rob Clark; Ramsay Gilderdale; Graham Mark Walker
- Starring: Gwen Taylor; Sam Kelly; Benedict Sandiford; Sherrie Hewson; Elizabeth Carling; Mark Benton; Madge Hindle; John Arthur; Jean Alexander
- Country of origin: United Kingdom
- Original language: English
- No. of series: 3
- No. of episodes: 29

Production
- Production location: Carlton Studios
- Running time: 25 minutes
- Production companies: Central (1995); Carlton Television (1999–2003)

Original release
- Network: ITV
- Release: 10 July 1995 – 4 April 2003

Barbara is a British sitcom starring Gwen Taylor in the title role. A pilot was broadcast on 10 July 1995 by Central Television, and three series were then televised on ITV from 27 June 1999 to 4 April 2003 by Carlton Television. It was filmed at Carlton Studios in Nottingham in front of a live studio audience. The majority of location scenes for the series were filmed in various suburbs of Nottingham, including Mapperley and West Bridgford, with other scenes filmed around Nottinghamshire and Derbyshire.

== Plot ==
Barbara Liversidge is a no-nonsense, outspoken, nosey, middle-aged doctor's receptionist with a sharp tongue. She has been married to her husband Ted, a mild-mannered taxi driver, for 40 years. Barbara is by far the dominant figure in the relationship, but Ted does occasionally stand up to her. The pair live in Pudsey, Leeds, West Yorkshire with their twenty-something son Neil, who drifts between jobs and a succession of short-term relationships. Their daughter, the long-suffering Linda, is married to Martin Pond, a TV presenter who has his own slot on the local news, Pond Life, which generally involves him making a fool of himself. Jean is Barbara's appearance-obsessed sister (Barbara once claims she's had so much plastic surgery that "she literally doesn't know her arse from her elbow") who marries the simpering Phil. Barbara's colleague at the doctor's surgery, Doreen, often regales Barbara with tales of the bizarre situations she and her never-seen husband Clive find themselves in.

Much of the humour revolves around Barbara's tactlessness and her family's fear of getting on the wrong side of her. While the family often complain about her, they usually find they struggle to manage when Barbara doesn't take charge. Although the show initially appears to have a very traditional sitcom setting, surreal humour is frequently used, such as Barbara baking a cake that looks like Judi Dench and a taxidermist friend of Ted's stuffing and mounting his dead wife. There were also some more drama-based plots, such as Linda's discovery she can't have any more children after the birth of her son George. In a particularly dark development, the final episode ("Who Shot Barbara?") ends with an unseen assailant shooting Barbara from behind – a cliffhanger which is never resolved.

== Cast ==
=== Series ===
- Gwen Taylor – Barbara Liversidge
- Sam Kelly – Ted Liversidge
- Benedict Sandiford – Neil Liversidge
- Sherrie Hewson – Jean Nesbitt
- Elizabeth Carling – Linda Pond
- Mark Benton – Martin Pond
- Madge Hindle – Doreen
- John Arthur – Phil
- Jean Alexander – Queenie Liversidge

=== Pilot ===
- Gwen Taylor – Barbara Liversage
- Sam Kelly – Ted Liversage
- Shirley Anne Field – Jean
- Caroline Milmoe – Linda Benson
- Glen Davies – Martin Benson
- Madge Hindle – Doreen
- Ben Robinson – Baby

== Series overview ==
Series	Episodes	Originally released	
Series	Episodes	First released	Last released
Pilot		10 July 1995	
1	6	27 June 1999	1 August 1999
2	10	24 November 2000	24 June 2001
3	12	23 April 2002	4 April 2003

== Episodes ==
=== Pilot (1995) ===
No. overall	Title	Directed by	Written by	Original release date
1	"Job"	Les Chatfield	Mark Bussell, Rob Clark, Ramsay Gilderdale, Graham Mark Walker	10 July 1995
Pushy Barbara Liversage [to be spelled Liversidge in later episodes] is a receptionist at a Leeds doctors' surgery, married to the mild-mannered taxi driver Ted. Barbara's daughter Linda is married to Martin Benson, a chef, who annoys Barbara when he announces that he and his wife and baby are relocating to Wales, causing Barbara to intervene. [Note: In the subsequent series, Martin's surname was changed to Pond and he was a reporter for a local television show. The characters of Martin, Linda and Jean were recast.]

=== Series 1 (1999) ===
All Sunday, 8 pm, ITV except Scattering, shown at 7 pm

No. overall	No. in series	Title	Directed by	Written by	Original release date	UK viewers (millions)
2	1	"Birthday"	Richard Boden	Mark Bussell, Rob Clark, Ramsay Gilderdale, Graham Mark Walker	27 June 1999	9.80
Abrasive doctor's receptionist Barbara is preparing for her sister Jean's birthday when daughter Linda rings to say she is ill. Barbara takes over her job as a market researcher but gets so many complaints she has to take drastic action to prevent Linda from getting the sack. Fellow receptionist Doreen decides that, at fifty-eight, she wants a baby but is put off after a traumatic experience, whilst Barbara's husband Ted is relieved to discover he was not responsible for killing the man next door and Linda's journalist husband Martin's job as an investigative reporter for Sky TV is short-lived. However, everything comes together for the birthday karaoke.
3	2	"Rivals"	Richard Boden	Mark Bussell, Rob Clark, Ramsay Gilderdale, Graham Mark Walker	4 July 1999	8.21
Barbara and Doreen find themselves competing for the attention of handsome young Dr. Brown but when he clearly prefers to spend time with pretty computer operator Sandra they gang up on him. Martin, who now has his own TV spot Pondlife, finds himself an unwilling love object due to besotted weather girl Karen's obsession with his thumbs whilst Jean, though humiliated when boyfriend Phil gets into a public fight with a rival lollipop man, relents when he proposes to her. Taxi driver Ted gets his vehicle stolen by a Mr. Spock impersonator but picks him out at the identity parade from his false ears.
4	3	"Armour"	Richard Boden	Mark Bussell, Rob Clark, Ramsay Gilderdale, Graham Mark Walker	11 July 1999	7.44
Having been sacked as a hospital visitor for failing to notice when a patient passed out, Barbara is not in the best of moods, especially as Ted is out clubbing with his new young friends, so she is ready to take on the builders across the road who have been waking her up at unearthly hours. Meanwhile Doreen and her husband are cautioned for dogging, Martin gets stripped and tied to a parking meter on a friend's stag night and Jean's romance with Phil continues to run anything but smoothly.
5	4	"Friends"	Richard Boden	Mark Bussell, Rob Clark, Ramsay Gilderdale, Graham Mark Walker	18 July 1999	6.40
Ted finds a salmon left in his cab so Barbara cooks it for tea but when the irate owner arrives demanding its return Ted buys another and pushes it through the letter box. Martin uses his TV spot to criticise Barbara after she insults him and Linda snubs her. However, when Barbara learns that Linda is expecting she has to swallow her pride and apologise. Doreen's husband gets involved in a neighbourhood war over hose-pipe bans whilst Jean leaves Phil for a muffins entrepreneur.
6	5	"Coffee"	Richard Boden	Mark Bussell, Rob Clark, Ramsay Gilderdale, Graham Mark Walker	25 July 1999	7.18
Jean returns to Phil but her obsession with his baldness leads Linda and Neil to believe that she is also bald and they try to prove it. A mix-up over an anorak wrongly picked up in the pub leads to Ted being arrested whilst Barbara regrets going for coffee with a lonely patient who falls in love with her. Meanwhile Martin gets stuck with his director's surly son on work experience and dumps the annoying boy by the roadside. However, a bizarre coincidence solves both Barbara's and Martin's problems.
7	6	"Scattering"	Richard Boden	Mark Bussell, Rob Clark, Ramsay Gilderdale, Graham Mark Walker	1 August 1999	5.02
Barbara drags the rest of the family to the Yorkshire moors to scatter her mother's ashes but no sooner has she began the ritual than Linda's waters break. Everybody piles into the car to get her home but, as Martin has changed the locks, the baby is born at Barbara's – with Barbara already planning her grandson's life. Martin rushes to be with his wife, taking lifts from a taxi driver who loses his way and a woman said to be the worst driver in Britain.

=== Series 2 (2000–01) ===
No. overall	No. in series	Title	Directed by	Written by	Original release date	UK viewers (millions)
8	1	"Kids"	Nic Phillips	Mark Bussell, Rob Clark, Ramsay Gilderdale, Graham Mark Walker	24 November 2000	7.55
The new baby is giving Martin sleepless nights and he falls asleep on air, getting him the sack. In frustration he punches an irritating clown at a children's party but is reinstated as all his would-be replacements are terrible. Doreen gets an indecent proposal and Neil is embarrassed by his aggressive, beer-swilling girlfriend whilst Barbara is persuaded by Ted to join him in a parachute jump and literally ends up with two feet in the grave.
9	2	"Massage"	Nic Phillips	Mark Bussell, Rob Clark, Ramsay Gilderdale, Graham Mark Walker	1 December 2000	<7.33
When Barbara does her back in she does not take kindly to Ted hiring beefy Mrs. Gibbs to do her cleaning and goes behind Neil's back to persuade his masseuse ex-girlfriend Kelly to give her a healing rub-down. Neil is not pleased and nor is Mrs. Gibbs when Barbara refuses to pay for the aerial shots Mrs. Gibbs' son took of the Liversedge house. Martin discovers that he has a stalker, who turns out to be a pensioner, whilst Jean overdoes the medication and sprouts facial hair.
10	3	"Mum"	Nic Phillips	Mark Bussell, Rob Clark, Ramsay Gilderdale, Graham Mark Walker	8 December 2000	8.70
Ted's mother Queenie, who is even ruder and more outspoken than Barbara – whom she dislikes – comes to visit and makes it clear she wants to stay but changes her mind after Barbara has accidentally broken her nose, though it makes her more human. Mike, the anchor-man at Martin's TV station moves in with Linda and Martin and makes a pass at Linda, apologising to Martin on air – which leads to a fight. Ted gives two robbers a lift to the airport without realising who they are – until the police arrive at the house.
11	4	"Christening"	Nic Phillips	Mark Bussell, Rob Clark, Ramsay Gilderdale, Graham Mark Walker	15 December 2000	7.56
Linda and Martin's baby's christening is not the most smooth running of affairs. Firstly Martin's divorced parents have a violent argument at Barbara's after the father has acquired a new young Thai bride. At the church Ted is shirtless, having been thrown up on by a hung-over Neil, who will repeat the trick in the font and Barbara is suffering from the effects of bad hairdressing. Martin himself only just makes it having got wedged in a child's ride, hiding from an obsessive fan. All it needs is for something to trigger off Phil's musical underpants.
12	5	"Tyres"	Nic Phillips	Mark Bussell, Rob Clark, Ramsay Gilderdale, Graham Mark Walker	22 December 2000	6.89
Barbara resigns after being told that patients have complained of her rudeness but, having gone for interview at another practice with an equally acerbic receptionist, grovels for her old job back – and finds Doreen can also be rude. Ted becomes the Phone a Friend for a colleague on 'Who Wants to be a Millionaire?' but, after having to drive a man whose tyres Barbara has slashed by mistake to Scotland, nods off when the call comes. Martin trying to emulate the dashing young investigative reporter next door, tries an aggressive approach to his interviews – with messy results – whilst Jean is appalled by the result of her face-lift.
13	6	"Fox"	Nic Phillips	Mark Bussell, Rob Clark, Ramsay Gilderdale, Graham Mark Walker	24 December 2000	7.59
Martin and Linda are not happy when Barbara offers to help mind the baby when Linda returns to work. Barbara is not happy when they tell her but following a domestic accident which she has caused it seems they might have a point. Ted is on his way to the local football ground in costume as their mascot Freddie the Fox when his car breaks down and he is pursued by a hunt whilst Phil's medication has bizarre side effects and Neil's efforts to have afternoon delight with an ex-con's wife are constantly thwarted.
14	7	"Sisters"	Nic Phillips	Mark Bussell, Rob Clark, Ramsay Gilderdale, Graham Mark Walker	23 March 2001	5.80
With Doreen away, Jean steps in to help Barbara at the surgery and is a great hit with the patients, organising sing-songs and games but unfortunately she is so popular she attracts people who are not sick and the waiting room gets so crowded Barbara has to sack her. Cora, Linda's unstable boss, starts to date Neil and becomes so obsessed with his body Linda takes drastic action to split them up whilst Martin pays the price for challenging a group of Germans to a darts match with the losers having to pay a forfeit.
15	8	"Mate"	Nic Phillips	Mark Bussell, Rob Clark, Ramsay Gilderdale, Graham Mark Walker	30 March 2001	<5.43
Ted makes a new friend in the lonely but pushy and irritating Vernon who shares Ted's interest in metal detection but is constantly visiting the house, staying overnight and even crashing Martin and Linda's dinner party. But when he declares his love for Barbara enough is enough and out he goes. Linda and Martin look after his boss's dog but it runs off – and Vernon adopts it, calling it Barbara. Phil meanwhile has a dispute with an undertaker whose funeral procession he has halted at the school crossing.
16	9	"Wedding"	Nic Phillips	Mark Bussell, Rob Clark, Ramsay Gilderdale, Graham Mark Walker	6 April 2001	5.97
Jean is going to marry Phil but Barbara is not happy – this time because Ted's old flame Yvonne is back in town and he is spending a much time with her. Following a hen night outing where stripper Hercules turns out to be Neil and the departure of Yvonne the great day dawns though Martin and Linda only just make it after attending a grand opening at a supermarket – to which nobody turns up. Jean makes a spectacular entrance though and eventually makes it down the aisle, on a hospital trolley.
17	10	"Sheep"	Nic Phillips	Mark Bussell, Rob Clark, Ramsay Gilderdale, Graham Mark Walker	24 June 2001	<4.34
Ted and Barbara spend a day returning sheep dumped on them to the countryside but for Ted the real nightmare is dreaming that he is in bed with first Jean and then Doreen. Martin is afraid that Linda thinks he is a joke because his 'scoop' stories are so mundane but after he has given the kiss of life to a cocky decorator who has collapsed in the surgery waiting room he is declared a hero whilst Phil keeps doing his back in in the most embarrassing places.

=== Series 3 (2002–03) ===
The twelve episodes making up Series Three were recorded as a complete series in 2001, but were split into two separate series upon broadcast – six airing in 2002 and the remaining six airing in 2003. The 2002 episodes were shown Tuesdays at 8.30 pm, apart from "Flood" which was shown at 8.00 pm and "Valentine" which was shown on a Saturday at 7.45 pm. All 2003 episodes were shown Sundays at 7.00 pm; with the exception of the last 2 episodes on Fridays at 8.30 pm due to the ITV News coverage of the Iraq war. The Series Three DVD release contains the full twelve episodes.

No. overall	No. in series	Title	Directed by	Written by	Original release date	UK viewers (millions)
18	1	"Queenie"	Nic Phillips	Mark Bussell, Rob Clark, Ramsay Gilderdale, Graham Mark Walker	23 April 2002	6.97
Having been thrown out of yet another care home Queenie becomes an unwelcome guest at Ted and Barbara's house refusing to move out. However, an unfortunate accident persuades Queenie that she is not wanted and decides to leave — though another one almost prevents her from going. Ted has a run-in with two transvestites, which spells humiliation for Jean, whilst Neil is unnerved by new girlfriend Isobel, who drops unsubtle hints about their wedding and even exposes him to the scrutiny of his potential in-laws.
19	2	"Flood"	Nic Phillips	Mark Bussell, Rob Clark, Ramsay Gilderdale, Graham Mark Walker	7 May 2002	5.40
Ted and Barbara put the house up for sale but, after a night of torrential rain, find that, like the rest of the street, they have been flooded out. This is not the best time for the carpet layer to turn up – or the couple viewing the house, though they are very positive despite the water. However, after a night of reminiscing on old times Barbara and Ted decide to take the house off the market. Neil meanwhile meets an older woman, who turns out to be very controlling.
20	3	"Valentine"	Nic Phillips	Mark Bussell, Rob Clark, Ramsay Gilderdale, Graham Mark Walker	11 May 2002	4.80
It's midnight and soon Valentine's Day will dawn but Ted and Martin have both forgotten and a quick visit to the all-night garage yields extremely unsuitable presents for their spouses. Ted tries to make amends by buying a second hand caravan and taking Barbara to the Lake District but the trip ends in disaster, Linda suspects Martin of an affair with co-presenter Wendy though matters are resolved when Wendy gives Martin her true opinion of him – unaware that the cameras are still rolling.
21	4	"Crime"	Nic Phillips	Mark Bussell, Rob Clark, Ramsay Gilderdale, Graham Mark Walker	14 May 2002	6.74
When the area is hit by a spate of burglaries Barbara joins the Neighbourhood Watch and hosts them at her house but so annoys the chairman Mr. Dugdale he expels her from the group. Then the lights go out and Mr. Dugdale falls down, losing his false teeth and hearing aid and, whilst groping under the piano for them, finding something rather unpleasant. With Linda away Martin agrees to accompany Neil to a club where he is meeting his date but both the date and her friend are big fans of Martin 's TV spot and ignore Neil. When Neil gets home he is hit over the head with a tray by Barbara, who mistakes him for a burglar.
22	5	"Weekend"	Nic Phillips	Mark Bussell, Rob Clark, Ramsay Gilderdale, Graham Mark Walker	21 May 2002	4.70
After a trying day at work Barbara and Ted both decide to take early retirement but find themselves under each other's feet and with time on their hands so they decide to return to work, Ted making a mercy dash to help an extremely pregnant woman. Martin and Linda spend a weekend away with a very competitive couple, causing Linda to make up hidden talents for Martin, leading to a disastrous horse ride. Jean and Phil mind baby George in their absence but prove to be incompetent sitters and call for Barbara when they think they have lost the baby.
23	6	"Baby"	Nic Phillips	Mark Bussell, Rob Clark, Ramsay Gilderdale, Graham Mark Walker	28 May 2002	4.97
Linda and Martin have been trying for another baby without success – though Martin is more pleased about this than Linda, but nonetheless agrees to go with her to investigate I.V.F. treatment. Barbara decides it is time for Neil to move out but is not keen for him to be living in his girlfriend's dirty flat and once more starts to interfere. Jean is having trouble with her breast implants and when one of them explodes has to be rushed to hospital in an ice cream van.
24	7	"Honeymoon"	Nic Phillips	Mark Bussell, Rob Clark, Ramsay Gilderdale, Graham Mark Walker	23 February 2003	5.34
To celebrate their fortieth wedding anniversary Ted takes Barbara to Scarborough, where they spent their original honeymoon. Unfortunately he also takes her to the run-down B & B where they spent the honeymoon, rather than the luxury hotel for which Barbara was hoping. In revenge she decides to party the night away with a visiting football team but next morning she and Ted end up in hospital when part of the hotel slides down the cliff in subsidence, taking them with it.
25	8	"Neighbours"	Nic Phillips	Mark Bussell, Rob Clark, Ramsay Gilderdale, Graham Mark Walker	2 March 2003	5.42
Christmas is coming but due to Barbara's abrasive manner the Liversidges are not getting many cards. Then Barbara gets it into her head that cheery new neighbours Angela and Norman are stealing her Christmas tree and poinsettia and her efforts to retrieve them lead to friction with Ted. Martin and Linda turn up as Martin's surfeit of Christmas lights has blown all the fuses in the house and left them in the dark. Thus there are two quarrelling couples spending Christmas under the same roof.
26	9	"Guy Fawkes"	Nic Phillips	Mark Bussell, Rob Clark, Ramsay Gilderdale, Graham Mark Walker	9 March 2003	5.94
Ted and Barbara go to offer their sympathies to his friend Frank, whose wife Edna has recently died and discover that Frank has taken up taxidermy and had Edna stuffed. They invite Frank to their bonfire night party and he brings Edna but Linda mistakes her for the guy and puts her on the fire. Ted lets off a big firework which destroys the new shed that Linda has bought him along with the purchases that Jean, who has become addicted to online shopping, is hiding in it from Phil. Reflecting on the day's events Ted tells Barbara that if she dies before him he can get Frank to stuff her.
27	10	"Kirsty"	Nic Phillips	Mark Bussell, Rob Clark, Ramsay Gilderdale, Graham Mark Walker	16 March 2003	5.02
Barbara and Ted return from holiday, Ted having broken his leg retrieving their luggage from the airport carousel. They find Neil head over heels in love with pizza delivery girl Kirsty, even though she is bossy and – to Barbara's mind – dirty. Martin has been having a run of bad luck and is surprised to meet his ex-girlfriend, who just happens to be Kirsty. Kirsty is still very much in love with Martin and decides that she cannot love another so she dumps Neil – much to Barbara's relief.
28	11	"Cottege"	Nic Phillips	Mark Bussell, Rob Clark, Ramsay Gilderdale, Graham Mark Walker	28 March 2003	<4.74
To celebrate Barbara's sixtieth birthday the family, with Doreen, head off for a country cottage for the weekend, only to find it double-booked and somebody else in residence. At Martin's suggestion they decide to go to a nearby hotel but the van breaks down in the dark in the middle of nowhere. Ted and Martin go for help but, after Martin has fallen into a ditch, get robbed by Bazza and Oz, two locals with whom they hitched a lift. If only Doreen had remembered to tell everybody that she had her mobile phone in her bag all the time.
29	12	"Who Shot Barbara?"	Nic Phillips	Mark Bussell, Rob Clark, Ramsay Gilderdale, Graham Mark Walker	4 April 2003	<5.07
Last-ever episode. Barbara rows with Ted, accusing him of spending too much time doing DIY for Neil's girlfriend's mother, an old flame of his. She also falls out with Linda and Martin after she baby-sits for them and accidentally sets their kitchen on fire. Neil is unhappy with her when she frightens his girlfriend off and, needless to say, she is not popular with the patients at the surgery or anybody in the street. So...who shot her in the bottom with an air-rifle?

== Filming locations ==
The majority of location scenes for the series were filmed in various suburbs of Nottingham, including Mapperley and West Bridgford. The exterior location for the Liversidge house is located on Sandford Road in Mapperley, whilst the exterior used for Barbara's workplace is the West Oak Surgery on nearby Westdale Lane.

Martin's news studio is the exterior of Carlton's Lenton Lane studios.

== Release ==
Barbara was first shown as a pilot within the Comedy Firsts series on 10 July 1995. Four years later, on 27 June 1999 the first of three series was presented, with some of the cast and names of the characters being changed from when the programme first appeared. Unusually for an English sitcom, Barbara was written by a team of writers; Mark Bussell, Rob Clark, Ramsay Gilderdale, Graham Mark Walker and Justin Sbresni. After the show ended in April 2003, reruns continued to air on ITV3. In 2025, That's TV channel started showing the series.

== Reception ==
Initial reactions to the pilot were lukewarm. While The Guardian described Taylor as 'ever-watchable', it felt there was too much focus on character at the expense of plot, summing up 'whether or not there's a series in here remains to be seen'. Critics remained ambivalent as Barbara progressed to full series; previewing the second series opener in The Guardian, Jonathan Wright felt the show had become 'an enjoyable slice of mainstream sitcom', but Charlie Catchpole in The Mirror felt Taylor and Kelly were both 'sadly wasted', remarking 'Carlton Television say Barbara is ITV's most popular comedy for five years. I believe them. It's not exactly a crowded field, is it?'. However, every episode of the 1999 and 2002 series was in ITV's top 30 weekly ratings as compiled by BARB and audience figures frequently averaged around 5-7 million viewers, 17 of the episodes winning their slots, meaning they were the most watched shows at the time of broadcast.

The Independent Television Commission's annual report for 2001 labelled Barbara 'a rare exception' to the otherwise unimpressive 'commitment to comedy shown by ITV', as represented by shows such as Sam's Game and Babes in the Wood.

== DVD releases ==
DVD	Release date	No. of discs	BBFC rating	Ref.
The Complete Series 1	13 September 2010	1	PG	
The Complete Series 2	17 January 2011	2	PG	
The Complete Series 3	23 May 2011	2	12	
The Complete Series	24 October 2011	5	12	
