= Sparrow (surname) =

Sparrow is a surname derived from the common name of the bird. Notable people with the surname include:

- Aaron Sparrow (born 1972), American football player
- Adolphus Sparrow (1869–1936), English cricketer
- Alexey Vorobyov (born 1988), also known as Alex Sparrow, Russian pop singer and musician
- Allan Sparrow (1944–2008), Canadian political activist
- Andrew Sparrow, British journalist
- Anthony Sparrow (1612–1685), English theologian and academic
- Anthony Sparrow (politician) (born 1955), Canadian politician
- Bobbie Sparrow (1935–2026), Canadian politician
- Brian Sparrow (1962–2019), English footballer
- Charles Sparrow (1808–1897), Canadian politician from Quebec
- Clodagh Hope Knox Sparrow (1905–1957), British poster artist
- Debra Sparrow, Musqueam weaver and artist
- Donald H. Sparrow (1935–1993), Canadian politician
- Don Sparrow, Canadian illustrator
- Edward Sparrow (1810–1882), Confederate States of America politician
- Emory Sparrow (1897–1965), Canadian ice hockey player
- Ephraim M. Sparrow (1928–2019), American engineer
- Frank Sparrow (1927–2000), Australian footballer
- George Sparrow (1869–1933), Australian footballer
- Gerald Sparrow (1903–1988), British lawyer, judge and travel writer
- Hélène Sparrow (1891-1970), Polish medical doctor and bacteriologist
- Henry Sparrow (1889–1973), English footballer
- Herbert O. Sparrow (1930–2012), Canadian politician
- Jeff Sparrow (born 1969), Australian writer
- John Sparrow (academic) (1906–1992), English academic and barrister
- John Sparrow (footballer) (born 1957), English footballer
- Lucy Sparrow (born 1986), English artist
- Matt Sparrow (born 1981), English footballer
- Mighty Sparrow (1935–2026), Trinidadian calypso vocalist, songwriter and guitarist
- Mike Sparrow (1948–2005), British radio producer and present
- Paul Sparrow (born 1975), English footballer
- Rajinder Singh Sparrow (1911–1994), Indian Army officer
- Rory Sparrow (born 1958), American basketball player
- Steve Sparrow, English vocalist
- Thomas J. Sparrow (1805–1870), American architect
- Walter Sparrow (1927–2000), British actor
- Walter Shaw Sparrow (1862–1940), British writer on art and architecture

== Fictional characters ==
- Eric Sparrow, character from Tony Hawk's game series
- Gary Sparrow, character from Goodnight Sweetheart
- Jack Sparrow, character in the Pirates of the Caribbean film series

== Disambiguation pages ==
- Guy Sparrow (disambiguation)
- John Sparrow (disambiguation)
- Robert Sparrow (disambiguation)
- Tom Sparrow (disambiguation)

== See also ==
- Mighty Sparrow (born Slinger Francisco 1935), West Indian calypso singer
