= Sparrow =

Sparrow may refer to:

== Birds ==
- Old World sparrows, family Passeridae
  - House sparrow, or Passer domesticus
- New World sparrows, family Passerellidae
- Two species in the Passerine family Estrildidae:
  - Java sparrow
  - Timor sparrow
- Hedge sparrow, also known as the dunnock or hedge accentor in the family Prunellidae

== People ==
- Sparrow (surname)
- Mighty Sparrow (born Slinger Francisco 1935), West Indian calypso singer
- Sparrow (American poet) (born 1953), American poet, activist, musician, and rabble-rouser
- Robert Brown (footballer) (born 1856), Scottish footballer known by the nickname 'Sparrow'

== Media ==
=== Films ===
- The Sparrow (1914 film), a 1914 French silent film
- Sparrows (1916 film), a Dutch film
- Sparrows (1926 film), starring Mary Pickford
- The Sparrow (1972 film), Arabic title Al Asfour, a 1972 Egyptian film by director Youssef Chahine
- Sparrow (1993 film), a 1993 Italian drama directed by Franco Zeffirelli
- Sparrow (2008 film), a Hong Kong film
- Sparrow (2010 film), a horror film directed by Shaun Troke
- Sparrows (2015 film), an Icelandic film directed by Rúnar Rúnarsson

=== Literature ===
- The Sparrow (novel), a 1996 science fiction novel by Mary Doria Russell
- The Sparrow (1967 play), by Alan Ayckbourn
- The Sparrow (2007 play), about a teenage girl with a troubled past

=== Music ===
==== Songs ====
- "Sparrow" (Marvin Gaye song), 1977
- "Sparrow" (Emeli Sandé song), 2019
- "Sparrows" (Cory Asbury song), 2020
- "Sparrow", by The Boo Radleys from Everything's Alright Forever
- "Sparrow", by the Cat Empire
- "Sparrow", by Charlotte Church from Three
- "Sparrow", by Mo-dettes from The Story So Far
- "Sparrow", by Simon & Garfunkel from Wednesday Morning, 3 A.M.
- "Sparrow", by Jordan Smith, which represented Kentucky in the American Song Contest
- "Sparrows", by Jason Gray from Where the Light Gets In
- "Sparrows", by Spratleys Japs from Pony
- "The Sparrow", by Mastodon from The Hunter
- "The Sparrow", by The Ramblers
- "Sparrow Song", by Skeleton Crew from Learn to Talk / Country of Blinds

==== Other uses in music ====
- Sparrows (album), by Anathallo, 2002
- Sparrow (Ashley Monroe album), by Ashley Monroe, 2018
- The Sparrows (band), a predecessor band to Steppenwolf that included John Kay
- Sparrows (band), a Canadian post hardcore trio
- Sparrow Quartet, American acoustic music group
- Sparrow Records, a record label

=== Other media ===
- Sparrow (TV series), a 2016 Chinese television series
- Gary Sparrow, a character from Goodnight Sweetheart
- Captain Jack Sparrow, a character from the Pirates of the Caribbean film series

== Ships ==
- HMS Sparrow, the name of various ships of the British Royal Navy
- USS Sparrow (AMc-31), a US Navy coastal minesweeper in commission from 1940 to 1941
- USS Sparrow II (SP-3231), a US Navy patrol boat in commission from 1918 to 1919

== Technology ==
- Sparrow (email client), an e-mail client for Mac OS X and iOS
- Sparrow (target missile), an Israeli air-launched target missile
- AIM-7 Sparrow, an American air-to-air missile
- CallAir A-9 Sparrow, an agricultural aircraft
- Carlson Sparrow, an ultralight aircraft
- Corbin Sparrow, a battery-powered electric vehicle or "micro car"
- Paladin Sparrow, an American powered parachute design
- Vortech Sparrow, an American gyroplane design
- Sea Sparrow missile
- Supermarine Sparrow, a British two-seat light aircraft designed by R. J. Mitchell
- AN/APQ-64 Sparrow II, a type of radar
- Beresheet, lunar lander formerly known as "Sparrow"
- IÉ 2700 and 2750 Classes (nicknamed Sparrow), Diesel Multiple Units in service in Ireland
- Sparrow (chatbot), an artificial intelligence-powered chatbot developed by researchers at DeepMind

== Other uses ==
- R v Sparrow, a Canadian judicial decision, and its "Sparrow test"
- Sparrow Lake, Ontario, Canada
- Sparrow, the Chinese name for Mahjong
- "The Sparrows", a nickname of the 79th Light Anti-Aircraft Battery, a Royal Artillery unit of the British Army
- Sparrow, a bowling term for 3 spares in a row

== See also ==
- The Sparrows (disambiguation)
- Sparrho, a search engine
