= List of Goodnight Sweetheart episodes =

The following is a complete list of episodes for the British sitcom Goodnight Sweetheart. The programme premiered on BBC1 on 18 November 1993, and originally ran for six series; which concluded on 28 June 1999. However, a one-off special episode aired on 2 September 2016, on BBC One.

The show was written and created by Laurence Marks and Maurice Gran, who wrote the complete first series of the show, after which they only wrote some episodes, along with a team of writers. The creators also wrote the final episode of the show, where Gary Sparrow finds he is trapped in 1945 with Phoebe. In an interview, the pair commented that Gary couldn't always have his cake and eat it.

== Series overview ==
Series	Episodes	Originally released	
Series	Episodes	First released	Last released
1	6	18 November 1993	23 December 1993
2	10	20 February 1995	1 May 1995
3	11	26 December 1995	4 March 1996
4	11	3 March 1997	20 May 1997
5	10	23 February 1998	27 April 1998
6	10	18 April 1999	28 June 1999
Special		2 September 2016	

== Episodes ==
=== Series 1 (1993) ===
No. overall	No. in series	Title	Original release date	UK viewers (millions)
1	1	"Rites of Passage"	18 November 1993	10.49
TV repairman Gary Sparrow lives a normal married life with his wife Yvonne in 1993. However, when he is called out to a job in the East End of London, he travels down an alleyway called Duckett's Passage and unknowingly finds himself in war-torn London in 1940. There he meets Phoebe Bamford, a barmaid at the Royal Oak, her father Eric, and Reg Deadman, a police constable. Initially thinking he's ended up at a 1940s thematic pub, an air raid leads him to realizing the truth of his situation.
2	2	"Fools Rush in"	25 November 1993	9.76
Gary is unable to comprehend what recently happened, so decides to tell his best friend Ron Wheatcroft about his adventure. While Yvonne advises him to get a suit for a chance of a promotion at his workplace, he is unable to forget his trip into the past, and so decides to return there upon buying a 1940s suit and money of the period, in order to meet Phoebe again and take her out on a date, under the pretence he is a spy working for British Intelligence.
3	3	"Is Your Journey Really Necessary?"	2 December 1993	9.33
Yvonne is not happy when she learns Gary has spent money on books about the Second World War. While Gary makes his excuses, he quickly learns from them that Phoebe's East-End London neighbourhood got heavily bombed by the Germans exactly 53 years ago that day. Panicked, he soon makes excuses to his wife, in order to return to the past to warn Phoebe. But his actions soon cause problems when the police question him over the knowledge of the air raid.
4	4	"The More I See You"	9 December 1993	9.06
Yvonne becomes irritated with Gary's strange purchases, especially when they happen to be World War II memorabilia. Whilst she is away on a university course, Gary asks Ron to print him some identity papers to help with his persona in the past. His friend agrees, on condition he gets a trip to 1940. Gary agrees, but it soon becomes clear he is the only one who can travel in time, leaving him worried his best friend will tell Yvonne what happened when he cannot fulfil his end of the bargain.
5	5	"I Get Along Without You Very Well"	16 December 1993	8.96
Gary becomes concerned that Yvonne might want to end their marriage because of his time travelling, and decides to put an end to this. But when he reads a newspaper article concerning a woman named Phoebe Sparrow, he quickly becomes worried he married her in the past, leading him to return to 1940 to find out if this is true. However, an accident puts him in hospital, where he faces a difficult situation, whilst Ron is forced to cover for him back in 1993.
6	6	"In the Mood"	23 December 1993	8.58
Ron convinces Gary to take a load of forged white five pound notes back to 1940, in order to make a killing on the stock market that year. Gary agrees after Yvonne complains about his obsession with World War II, where he takes the opportunity to impress Eric and Phoebe by helping them to have a meeting with the King. When the stocks he buys earn him considerable money, Gary takes the opportunity to treat Phoebe to an evening in the West End, until fate has other ideas. Last appearance: David Ryall as Eric

=== Series 2 (1995) ===
No. overall	No. in series	Title	Original release date	UK viewers (millions)
7	1	"Don't Get Around Much Anymore"	20 February 1995	12.73
Six months since he last saw Phoebe in the past, Gary finds his life in 1994 not looking so great with Yvonne's life changing. When Ron suggests a new scheme involving time travel to make an investment in the past that will have huge returns waiting for them in the present, Gary reluctantly agrees. Upon returning to 1941 to conduct it, he takes time to visit the Royal Oak, only to learn Phoebe has lost her father to an air raid, and her husband was taken prisoner by the Germans.
8	2	"I Got It Bad and That Ain't Good"	27 February 1995	13.45
Yvonne makes clear she wants to move house and have a baby, things that soon put pressure on Gary. To escape this, he decides to bring treats from 1994 to 1941 for Phoebe, which are not readily available owing to rationing. The visit soon leads him to become jealous of a new admirer of hers in the form of a Czechoslovak soldier named Ludo, who he soon discovers might be after something other than Phoebe's attention, prompting him to interfere for her sake regardless of her wishes.
9	3	"Just One More Chance"	6 March 1995	12.79
Gary's marriage in 1994 is placed under strain after he is convicted of drink-driving, losing his driving licence and his job. Deeply concerned, Yvonne arranges for them to attend marriage counselling, which has an unexpectedly profound effect on their sex life. Meanwhile back in 1941, Gary works to get back into Phoebe's good books after his previous actions, which soon leads to discussion about a possible future together for them.
10	4	"Who's Taking You Home Tonight?"	13 March 1995	12.72
To conceal his time travelling jaunts from Yvonne, Gary asks Ron to cover for him by claiming he is doing late-night work for him at his company. Although this succeeds, Gary's plans to take her out for an evening meal are complicated when Phoebe arranges for him to share a meal with her on the same night. This leads him to finding a solution to attend both meals with the women he loves, no matter the price he must pay for this.
11	5	"Wish Me Luck..."	20 March 1995	12.87
Yvonne surprises her husband with news she has been offered a promotion, which will mean they would have to move to Macclesfield. Gary realizes that this would effectively prevent him from continuing his double life between the 1940s and 1990s, leading him to decide to spend his time with Phoebe. With Ron's help, he fakes his suicide in 1994, in order to return to 1941, where he finds he must secure accommodation as part of his choice with his life.
12	6	"As You Wave Me Goodbye"	27 March 1995	12.64
Gary finds life in 1941 is not so great as he hoped, which dampens his mood and causes his relationship with Phoebe to be strained, especially when he fails to assist in fire-watching duty. To escape his troubles, Gary returns to 1994, where he learns from Ron his suicide note was not found, giving him an opportunity to recover in the present. Able to return to 1941 a much happier person, he soon upholds his promise to Phoebe to help, giving him a chance to rebuild his relationship with her.
13	7	"Would You Like to Swing on a Star"	3 April 1995	13.04
Gary struggles to secure money for his life in 1994, so decides to sell items from the 1940s as pristine antiques in the present. Yvonne becomes heavily involved with her drama group, but this leads her husband to become jealous of her role alongside a good-looking actor. Meanwhile, Gary decides to enter a talent contest in 1941 to win Phoebe a radiogram, where he uses his fictional hobbies and interests as a singer-songwriter to good use to perform a modern song as his own.
14	8	"Nice Work If You Can Get It"	10 April 1995	12.42
Gary finds his double life under pressure following his success in the talent show. In 1994, he must perform alongside Yvonne for an upcoming play, whilst in 1941, he is signed up to talent agent Sidney Wix to perform around London in venues that are not favourable. Nervous because of this, he visits a doctor to receive something to calm his nerves, but begins taking them more and more, as he copes with news that Wix wants him to sell "his" songs to others, something he must not do.
15	9	"Let Yourself Go"	24 April 1995	12.76
Yvonne believes she is pregnant and decides to visit her parents for the weekend. Gary decides to take this opportunity to travel to 1941. There, he accompanies Phoebe on a trip to the countryside to visit her niece and nephew after they were evacuated in London. During this time, Gary encounters an American serving in the RAF who nearly exposes him as a liar, takes his relationship with Phoebe to a new level, all whilst dealing with future parenthood by helping Phoebe's niece.
16	10	"Don't Fence Me In"	1 May 1995	12.50
Gary learns that building work is to take place in Duckett's Passage in 1994, threatening his time-travelling lifestyle. At the same time in 1941, Phoebe faces trouble when brewery representative George Harrison plans to remove her from the tenancy of the Royal Oak unless she does favours for him. Gary is forced to find solutions for both, in order to ensure his time-travelling life can carry on and that Phoebe can still retain ownership of the Royal Oak.

=== Series 3 (1996) ===
No. overall	No. in series	Title	Original release date	UK viewers (millions)
17	1	"Between the Devil and the Deep Blue Sea"	26 December 1995	10.66
Christmas Special - Gary seeks to buy a commercial unit in 1994 where the time portal resides after Duckett's Passage is rebuilt, but faces problems when a female property agent tries to seduce him before attempting to ruin his marriage with Yvonne. Meanwhile, Ron terrifies him with suggestions someone influenced the Americans' decisions over Pearl Harbor before the Japanese attacked it, leading Gary to return to 1941 to try to convince a senior American he has had premonitions of the attack.
18	2	"It Ain't Necessarily So"	1 January 1996	10.76
When Gary returns from a skiing holiday, he goes to see Phoebe, but makes an error in front of Mrs Bloss. This creates problems for Phoebe, but Mrs Bloss has a secret too. Stella Wheatcroft arranges a New Year's Eve party but doesn't invite Ron. Gary benefits from British Summer Time.
19	3	"One O'Clock Jump"	8 January 1996	11.08
Talking to Reg in 1942, Gary is surprised to find that Reg has no children. Eventually Gary discovers that Reg has had an affair with a bus conductress, Margie, and that unknown to Reg she has a little boy, Frankie, who is Reg's son.
20	4	"It's a Sin to Tell a Lie"	15 January 1996	11.28
While Ron and Stella continue to have their marital problems, Gary discovers that somebody is passing forged notes in wartime England. Ron tells him that the Germans flooded England with forged notes, hoping to undermine Great Britain's economy.
21	5	"Change Partners"	22 January 1996	11.22
Gary has become overconfident about his relationships with both Phoebe and Yvonne, and boasts to Ron about his prowess with women.
22	6	"Goodnight Children Everywhere"	29 January 1996	12.20
Back in 1942 Phoebe's orphaned niece and nephew Sally and Peter are back from the country and are staying with Phoebe at the Royal Oak. The Kray twins, who live just around the corner, are forbidden to join as their behaviour is too disruptive.
23	7	"Turned Out Nice Again"	5 February 1996	12.12
In 1942 Gary encounters George Formby and his organising wife who want to buy a hit song from him. Phoebe believes that Gary should sell them his new song – "When I'm Sixty-Four" – but Gary has doubts about the matter and dissuades George from purchasing this Beatles classic.
24	8	"There's Something About a Soldier"	12 February 1996	12.19
Phoebe's husband Donald (played by Ralph Ineson) has escaped from a prisoner-of-war camp in Italy and has been welcomed home as a hero.
25	9	"Someone to Watch Over Me"	19 February 1996	13.06
Gary returns to 1942 and discovers that Phoebe is very ill in hospital with pneumonia.
26	10	"The Yanks are Coming"	26 February 1996	10.98
With America in the war, her soldiers are in London and visit the Royal Oak. Inevitably this causes difficulty for Gary, when being questioned about his imaginary lifestyle in America. Back in the 1990s, Ron pesters Gary to strike a trading deal with the Americans.
27	11	"Let's Get Away From It All"	4 March 1996	10.88
Yvonne is very keen to sell their home in Cricklewood and move into a large complex with a swimming pool and gymnasium in the basement. Last appearance: Dervla Kirwan as Phoebe and Michelle Holmes as Yvonne

=== Series 4 (1997) ===
No. overall	No. in series	Title	Original release date	UK viewers (millions)
28	1	"You're Driving Me Crazy"	3 March 1997	9.47
Yvonne and Phoebe are both pregnant, and Gary is worried sick about how he is going to cope with looking after two babies in two different eras. First appearance: Elizabeth Carling as Phoebe and Emma Amos as Yvonne
29	2	"In the Mood"	10 March 1997	8.94
Both Yvonne and Phoebe are experiencing very bad morning sickness, and Gary's sex life is non-existent.
30	3	"Out of Town"	17 March 1997	9.46
Yvonne leaves for Korea, telling Gary that she will phone him every evening at 11:00 pm. This does not suit Gary who has a holiday in the country with Phoebe planned for the next week, so Ron comes to the rescue again, telling Yvonne when she rings that Gary is suffering from laryngitis. The episode features Roger Sloman as Gary's dad.
31	4	"And Mother Came Too"	24 March 1997	8.26
Ron is involved in a fight with Stella's latest lover, and ends up in prison. In the past, Donald (Phoebe's husband) is killed in Egypt, his mother also comes to stay whilst taking a strong dislike to Gary. With Donald now dead, Gary assumes that he and Phoebe can get married right away and this upsets Phoebe who says that they will have to wait at least a year before they get married. This is the only episode the character of Yvonne does not appear.
32	5	"The Leaving of Liverpool"	8 April 1997	7.43
While in Liverpool with Phoebe, Gary meets Ron's grandfather, who, according to history, saved a child from a burning building. But when the so-called "hero" is imprisoned, Gary is shocked to see its effect on the future.
33	6	"How Long Has This Been Going On?"	15 April 1997	6.84
Reg Deadman's girlfriend Margie has split from her abusive husband and at Gary's suggestion they have decided to move in together with their little boy Frankie. Unfortunately Margie's husband visits the Royal Oak and mistakes Gary for Reg, with almost disastrous results.
34	7	"Easy Living"	22 April 1997	6.68
While coming to terms with her miscarriage, Yvonne becomes interested in alternative health therapies.
35	8	"Come Fly with Me"	29 April 1997	6.00
Gary attends two stag nights in two different time eras. Ron has got alcohol, a "blue" film and stripper in store, while heavy drinking persists at the Royal Oak, leading to Gary fainting and waking up on a plane over the English channel.
36	9	"Heartaches"	6 May 1997	Unknown
A hectic stag night causes Gary to wake up late for his wedding. When rushing back to the 1940s, a funeral is taking place at the Church, and Phoebe is reluctant to speak to Gary.
37	10	"Careless Talk"	13 May 1997	7.12
Ron's marriage to Stella is over, and he isn't having any luck with the opposite sex. Meanwhile, he refuses to print any more white fivers for Gary, unless Gary sets him up with Yvonne's attractive friend Kate, who really isn't interested.
38	11	"The Bells Are Ringing"	20 May 1997	7.09
Yvonne invests all of hers and Gary's money in a health-food venture with a man called Clive whom Gary despises because he wears a ponytail. Phoebe gives birth to her and Gary's baby.

=== Series 5 (1998) ===
No. overall	No. in series	Title	Original release date	UK viewers (millions)
39	1	"A Room with a View"	23 February 1998	8.85
Gary takes Michael out in his pram onto Whitechapel Road and is nearly killed by a bomb. When he awakes in the present day, he is horrified to discover Michael has also travelled in time.
40	2	"London Pride"	2 March 1998	7.86
Gary is moving up the social ladder in both eras, though not smoothly in either. Noël Coward helps Phoebe to cope with living in the West End when she has trouble with the butcher, by showing her how to improve her accent. As Yvonne's business makes her a celebrity, she plans a new house, and is invited to the Woman of the Year awards, which is followed by a party at No. 10 Downing Street. Gary and Phoebe get their revenge on the butcher.
41	3	"When Two Worlds Collide"	9 March 1998	8.89
A bomb explosion blasts the time warp open to all and throws Reg against a wall, giving him a blow on the head that makes him much smarter than he had been, and he suddenly starts solving crimes in his area. Phoebe, trying to follow Gary, unknowingly stumbles into the 1990s, to Gary's horror. Ron has gone to meet his date, but misses the opportunity of meeting an attractive female when Gary urgently asks for his help. Gary convinces Phoebe that the shop is his secret place of work for the intelligence service and plays a recording of a bombing raid to keep her hiding beneath a table and stop her going outside into present-day London. Gary is frozen with fear when Phoebe and Yvonne meet, but Ron saves the day.
42	4	"Mairzy Doats"	16 March 1998	8.82
With the time portal still haywire, Ron makes it back to the 1940s, where he is out of place and makes Gary's life even more difficult, but Ron resents Gary's attempts to restrain Ron's exuberance in a bomb shelter during an air raid, and, using his powers as 'Commander Bond', Gary ends up tied up. But when Ron starts telling everyone in the bomb shelter about what will happen in the future, it sounds so outrageous that it convinces everyone that Commander Bond is raving mad and Gary is released.
43	5	"Pennies from Heaven"	23 March 1998	8.66
Gary desperately needs more wartime five-pound notes, but Mrs. Flanagan, Ron's employer at the printing works, won't let the staff do private work in company time. Ron gets Gary to go on a 'date' with Mrs Flanagan to get her out of the way for a few hours so that he and other employees can do some private printing. When Gary and Flanagan return, they find the police have raided the printing works and Ron is arrested for counterfeiting wartime £5 notes. However, this turns out not to be an offence and he is released, but, since he has spilled the beans on the reason why he was printing the obsolete currency, is required to see a psychiatrist. Back in 1944, Gary had been trying to raise local currency by using his knowledge of the results of races to win money from an illegal bookmaker. However, the bookmaker makes sure he wins by reporting the wrong results. During the melee that results from Gary's remonstrations with the bookmaker, Reg is hit on the head, changing him back to the dim-witted Reg he was before he was hit on the head when the bomb in Duckett's Passage went off.
44	6	"We Don't Want to Lose You"	30 March 1998	8.28
Yvonne continues to travel for Nature Boy Cosmetics. Gary takes Phoebe to the Cafe Royal, where his false wartime identity finally catches up with him, and he is recruited by MI5 for a secret mission to the Isle of Wight.
45	7	"...But We Think You Have to Go"	6 April 1998	8.18
Gary's mission to the Isle of Wight takes him to France instead, where he is captured by the Gestapo. He must figure out a way to explain before he is sent to Berlin to be tortured. Meanwhile, Ron is recruited by Yvonne to escort a fashion model to the launch of a new Nature Boy product.
46	8	"Have You Ever Seen a Dream Walking..."	13 April 1998	7.39
Gary is very unsettled after his French adventure, and he feels like he's losing his mind: he can't tell whether he's awake or asleep, dreaming or experiencing reality. Then Rolf Harris appears in one of his dreams, while Gary is playing and singing "Two Little Boys". Anachronistically, the song was in fact written in 1902 and was quite popular at the time, before it had a resurgence in 1969 when Harris released the single. In Gary's dreams, Yvonne and Phoebe come together (with Ron and, briefly, Reg) and deliberately make him feel guilty about how he has been using them all.
47	9	"Love the One You're With"	20 April 1998	8.17
Yvonne is signing copies of her just-published autobiography. Meanwhile, Gary finds out from the porter in the 1990s that the owner of his 1940s West End flat is going to be killed in a road accident – what is he to do? Discovering Reg Deadman is still alive in the 90s, he visits the elderly Reg to get information. Reg at first recognizes Gary, but his memory is shot and is of no help in solving the mystery. In desperation, Gary moves the family out of the apartment and the real estate agent moves in rent-free. Gary feels guilty about having set him up to be killed and goes back to 1944 to warn him about the accident. During the discussion, they hear the sound of an accident, and it turns out to have been the person living in number 16 not number 15 who was killed. In the background, Gary is supposed to be attending Margie's 40th birthday party in 1944 while simultaneously staying in the Ritz for an amorous evening with Yvonne.
48	10	"My Heart Belongs to Daddy"	27 April 1998	7.29
Gary's now grown-up son Michael comes into the shop to sell some of Phoebe's things. He has spent time in prison and lives in a one-room flat in Hackney. After seeing what could become of Michael, Gary attempts to make sure he has a brighter future. His decision to donate the royalties from a song that he 'wrote' for Phoebe makes all the difference to Michael's future. This time, Michael is a success and has moved to New Zealand and has two children. The girl is named 'Phoebe' after her grandmother, but Gary is disappointed to hear that his grandson is not named after him. Note: The role of Michael was played by Ian Lavender, who appeared in Dad's Army. In the first episode of Series 2, Gary went to a bank where he met two people named Mainwaring and Wilson, name of two characters from Dad's Army. During their discussion, Gary says "stupid boy" to their assistant, (whose surname is Major, the same as Margaret Thatcher's Chancellor of the Exchequer and successor). This was what Captain Mainwaring would say to Private Frank Pike; who was played by Ian Lavender

=== Series 6 (1999) ===
No. overall	No. in series	Title	Original release date	UK viewers (millions)
49	1	"Mine's a Double"	18 April 1999	7.83
Gary gets struck by lightning as he enters the time portal, thus an evil duplicate of himself is released. The pathologically evil replicate begins causing a stir, yet it seems Yvonne and Ron prefer Gary's alter ego. The alter ego first ties Gary up, but the original Gary gets free and hunts him down, taking a shot at him in The Royal Oak. The evil one fools Ron into believing that it is the real Gary who is the twin and the two capture the real Gary, and the evil one is about to shoot him when a third Gary shows up. This is the really good and selfless Gary. The evil one is overcome by Ron and the two Garys are reunited when they pass through the time portal together.
50	2	"All about Yvonne"	25 April 1999	6.96
Gary becomes depressed when Yvonne throws him out of the house, thus he goes to stay with Ron and his girlfriend. Things aren't much easier in war-torn London either, as Phoebe suspects Gary of having an affair with another woman. Gary tries to use Ron's girlfriend to make Yvonne jealous, and manages to persuade Yvonne to give him another chance.
51	3	"California Dreamin'"	2 May 1999	5.70
Yvonne wants to be near the expansion of her Nature Boy cosmetics into the US market and move to California, but Gary convinces her to stay with him in London. Meanwhile Phoebe also has her heart set on moving to California and starting a new life when the Royal Oak comes under new management. Reg retires from the police force and is disappointed when Gary is the only one to show up to his retirement party. Gary tries to distract Phoebe from his Californian dream by setting her up managing a night club, where she also becomes the featured singer. Reg is hired by Phoebe as the bouncer and part-time barman. Gary is congratulating himself on having successfully distracted Phoebe from her dream as she did not mention California once when talking with him during a break between sets, but then she starts singing a song that Gary "wrote" called "California Dreamin'" (as arranged for Nancy Sinatra).
52	4	"Grief Encounter"	16 May 1999	5.66
Phoebe loses her patience when Gary backs out of a part in Noël Coward's latest film, Brief Encounter, unaware that this is because he doesn't want to be recognised in it in the 1990s.
53	5	"The 'Ouses in Between"	23 May 1999	6.20
When Gary travels the wrong way from the 1940s, he ends up in Victorian London where Jack the Ripper is on the loose; Gary also learns the murderer has been using the backyard of his shop as a hideout. In the 1990s, Yvonne sells Nature Boy cosmetics for a multimillion-pound sum of money.
54	6	"Just in Time"	30 May 1999	6.10
Gary is preparing to celebrate Christmas in 1944 when a shady character from the future arrives at Gary's shop to close a time portal, Gary decides his priorities lie in the 1940s with Phoebe and his son. He leaves the shop to Ron, who promptly sells the entire stock to a teenager from the future.
55	7	"How I Won the War"	6 June 1999	6.44
A trip to northern France to entertain the troops forces Gary to play the hero following a sudden advance by the Germans.
56	8	"Something Fishie"	13 June 1999	5.26
Gary and Phoebe have to deal with a protection racket, while Yvonne receives a rude surprise.
57	9	"Flash Bang Wallop"	21 June 1999	6.86
Gary must take drastic measures to ensure that a compromising photo from the 1940s isn't seen in the present by Yvonne.
58	10	"Accentuate the Positive"	28 June 1999	8.33
Yvonne sees Gary go through the time portal and demands answers on his return. Gary later celebrates VE Day with Phoebe, Reg and company, and saves guest-speaker Clement Attlee's life when a foe tries to kill him. Surmising that this was why he had been sent back, to his horror, he then finds that the time portal has closed, leaving him trapped in the 1940s, with Ron explaining the full story to Yvonne in the 1990s.

=== Special (2016) ===
No. overall	No. in series	Title	Original release date	UK viewers (millions)
59	1	"Many Happy Returns"	2 September 2016	4.66
Seventeen years on and living in 1962, Gary realises he has the opportunity to witness himself being born. On arrival at the maternity hospital, he meets his own father waiting anxiously, and when the baby arrives, tells the midwife that he is its uncle. As the midwife hands Gary his newborn self, the time portal is thunderously reopened and adult Gary is catapulted into 2016.
