= Mine's a Double =

Mine's a Double may refer to:

- "Mine's a Double" (Chelmsford 123), a 1990 television episode
- "Mine's a Double" (Goodnight Sweetheart), a 1999 television episode
- "Mine's a Double" (My Hero), a 2002 television episode
