= Tom Vernon =

British broadcaster, musician, and writer

- Born: Thomas Bowater Vernon; 23 April 1939; Stepney, London, England
- Died: 11 September 2013 (aged 74); Cévennes, France
- Occupations: Musician, broadcaster, author
- Known for: Fat Man series
- Spouse: Sally Langley (née Pearce)
- Children: 2

Thomas Bowater Vernon (23 April 1939 – 11 September 2013) was a British broadcaster and writer, best known as the titular "Fat Man" of a number of popular travelogues.

== Early life ==
Thomas Bowater Vernon was born on 23 April 1939 in Stepney, London, the son of a Bengal Lancer and colonial administrator for Nigeria. His mother was a hospital matron. He attended schools in Shropshire, Sussex, Dorset and Kent. At Gillingham Grammar School he was head boy, and was the first pupil from the school to go to Cambridge University. After school, Vernon studied English at Pembroke College, Cambridge. At university, he joined the drama society, Pembroke Players, and amateur theatre group, Cambridge Footlights. After graduating Vernon worked briefly as a teacher and then a Public Relations Officer for the Royal Shakespeare Company before joining the British Humanist Association.

== Humanist career ==
Vernon was the Press and Public Relations Officer for the British Humanist Association, an organisation which promotes humanism, human rights, and secularism in Britain. In 1965 he became the force behind the organisation's drive to seek out a new logo, and launched a public competition. The winning entry, the so-called Happy Human, came to stand as an international symbol for Humanism and was adopted by humanist organisations around the world. Vernon's other duties at the BHA included oversight of its various publications. His campaigning work was significant; he is credited with helping secure the decriminalisation of abortion in Britain.

== Radio career ==
While working for the British Humanist Association, Vernon started writing topical current affairs songs for the Today programme on BBC Radio 4. In 1970, he was the first presenter on the newly launched BBC Radio London. During his time at Radio London, he presented a range of programmes including a classical music programme with Michael Oliver, readings of novels in which he played all the characters, a programme on the history or London and as a newsreader. He had a vasectomy live on air.

Vernon returned to Radio 4, and wrote and produced The Boy from the Blacking Factory, a play about Charles Dickens' early life, starring Alan Badel. Vernon also presented the nightly arts programme Kaleidoscope and a listener reaction programme, Feedback.

Vernon wrote and recorded Christmas stories for the 'dial-Santa' service for the London Telephone area in the 1970s, alongside fellow Radio London presenter Mike Sparrow, which children were able to hear at home by dialling a special telephone number.

== The Fat Man series ==
After several years working as a presenter and interviewer for BBC Radio 4, Vernon's first travelogue series was Fat Man On A Bicycle, in 1979. As the title implied, Vernon was obese, and the first episode followed the health tests he had to undergo before setting off on his journey, which took him from Muswell Hill, north London, to the Mediterranean coast of southern France. He was described as "bushy-bearded, weighs 19 stone and wears sandals on his bare feet all year round ... furthermore, he bicycles everywhere", and described himself as "You are the shape you are. There’s no point ruining your life trying to be something else". Vernon would repeat this journey fifteen years later for the television series Fat Man in France.

Fat Man at Work and his first television series, Fat Man in the Kitchen, deviated from the travelogue style of the other series. The former featured Vernon talking to people working in factories, while the latter was a cookery programme filmed in his own kitchen in Muswell Hill, in which each edition was devoted to the cuisine of a different country. This was one of the first cooking programmes to be filmed outdoors.

=== Radio series ===
- Fat Man on a Bicycle (1979)
- Fat Man in Italy (1980)
- Fat Man on a Roman Road (1983)
- Fat Man at Work (1983)

=== Television series ===
- Fat Man in the Kitchen (BBC, 1985–6, two series)
- Fat Man Goes Norse (Channel 4, 1987)
- Fat Man in Argentina (Channel 4, 1990)
- Fat Man Goes Cajun (Channel 4, 1991)
- Fat Man Goes West (Meridian, 1993)
- Fat Man in France (BBC, 1994)
- Fat Man Wilts (Meridian, 1995)
- Fat Man of Kent (Meridian, 1996)

=== Publications ===
- Fat Man on a Bicycle: A Discovery of France (1981) ISBN 0-7181-2072-8
- Fat Man on a Roman Road (1983) ISBN 0-7181-2349-2
- Fat Man in the Kitchen (1986) ISBN 0-563-20462-1
- Fat Man in Argentina (1990) ISBN 0-7181-3450-8
- Fat Man in France (1994) ISBN 0-563-37051-3

== Awards ==
In 1981, Vernon won radio personality of the year for his BBC Radio 4 series Fat Man in Italy; radio presenter of the year, and producer of the best radio documentary. He was awarded a medal from the Argentine government for his Channel 4 programme Fat Man in Argentina, for improving relations in the wake of the Falklands War.

== Personal life and death ==
Vernon's second marriage was to Sally Langley (née Pearce) in 1967 in Hampstead, north west London, after meeting her while working at the Elizabethan Rooms, Kensington Gore. He was working as a minstrel in period costume and she was working as a wench. The couple had two sons, Jos and Hal. The marriage ended in divorce in 1986; however, the pair remarried in 1992, having moved to France together in 1990.

Vernon died of a heart attack on 11 September 2013, aged 74, at his home in the Cévennes, France.
