= The Rose and the Rime =

Rose and the Rime is a play written and directed by Nathan Allen, originally workshopped and performed at Hope College in 2006.

== About ==
Rose and the Rime is a fantasy play written by the House Theatre of Chicago's creative team Nathan Allen, Chris Mathews, and Jake Minton in 2006. The play has a run time of about 85 minutes. The creation of Rose and the Rime followed the House Theatre's success with their original play Sparrow in the previous season. Rose and the Rime balances a fantastical plot with the human themes of greed, power, birth and age.

=== Synopsis ===
The Michigan town of Radio Falls has been trapped in a perpetual winter for an entire generation, cursed by the Rime Witch and her magic coin to an eternal blizzard that blocks every way in or out of the town. The last moment of warmth and passion in Radio Falls gave the town its only remaining child; a young girl named Rose, who is determined to save the town from the Rime Witch's curse. Her success, however, comes at a cost. The magic of the witch's coin can either nurture or destroy those who possess it, and Rose and her town begin to understand the true ramifications of power.

== Original Team ==
=== Original Cast ===
Prior to its first professional run, Rose and the Rime debuted at the DeWitt Center Main Stage at Hope College in Holland, Michigan in April 2007. The Hope College production was workshopped by guest artist Nathan Allen, the artistic director of The House Theatre of Chicago, who began work with Hope College students in 2006 in monthly workshops for actors, directors, theatre technicians and writers. His work with the students developed into Allen's residency at the college in March and April 2007, when the first run of the production was staged. The Hope College production of Rose and the Rime starred Rachel Wells as Rose, held a cast of around 25 students, and was directed by Allen.

The first professional production of Rose and the Rime was done by The House Theatre of Chicago and staged at the Chopin Theatre. The original production ran from February 19, 2009 to April 11, 2009.

Character	Actor/Actress
Rose	Carolyn Defrin
Chorus	Dana Tretta
Featured	Maria McCullough
Featured	Mike Smith
Featured	Joey Steakley
Chorus	Lucy Carapetyan
Chorus	Chelsea Keenan
Chorus	Stephanie Polt
Featured	Brandon Ruiter
Chorus	Brett Schneider
Chorus	Zeke Sulkes

=== Original Creative Team ===
Direction	Nathan Allen
Costume Design	Debbie Baer
Sound Design	Josh Horvath
Lighting Design	Lee Keenan
Composer	Kevin O'Donnell
Scenic/Prop Design	Collette Pollard
Choreography	Tommy Rapley

=== Revivals ===
Rose and the Rime has been performed by dozens of colleges and troupes across the country since its formal debut in 2009. Listed below are the professional revivals of the production since its original run. Rose and the Rime has also been performed by the Yale Cabaret, Kent State University at Tuscarawas, Michigan Tech Theatre, the Stoneham Theatre Young Company, and the Phillip Lynch Theatre of Lewis University.

- The House Theatre of Chicago's Season 12 Revival at the Chopin Theatre

The House Theatre staged a revival of Rose and the Rime from January 18 to March 23, 2014 with added special effects and aerial spectacle at the Chopin Theatre. The play also underwent a revision by the original writing team before its revival. Paige Collins starred as Rose.

- Adrienne Arsht Center of Miami

The House Theatre performed Rose and the Rime at the Adrienne Arsht Center from April 23 to May 18, 2014. The actors of Rose and the Rime also held an acting workshop at the Arsht center on May 4, 2014.

== Awards and honors ==
Rose and the Rime was one of three plays nationwide to be selected for the national American College Theatre Festival at the Kennedy Center in Washington, D.C., in 2008. After succeeding at the regional festival, the original Hope College cast of Rose and the Rime performed at the Kennedy Center's Terrace Theater on April 17, 2008.

== Responses and Reviews ==
Rose and the Rime has received considerable press in every professional revival. Chris Jones of the Chicago Tribune reviewed both the 2009 and 2014 Chicago versions of the play, and was able to contrast both the writing and staging of the production and the cultural context in which each version was received. His review of the 2009 version can be found here, and his review of the 2014 version can be found here.

Overall, critics comment on the use of space and movement in the play, praising the physical action and energy that stays high throughout the entirety of the play. Some critics found the play to be somewhat lacking in dialogue, and in the development of the various characters.
