= Double Income, No Kids Yet =

Double Income, No Kids Yet is a British radio sitcom written by David Spicer and originally broadcast on BBC Radio 4 from June 2001 to November 2003. There were three series of six episodes each starring David Tennant as Daniel and Elizabeth Carling as Lucy, a childless couple in a world of people with children.

== Cast ==
- David Tennant as Daniel
- Elizabeth Carling as Lucy
- Tony Gardner as Andy
- Meera Syal (series 1) / Samantha Spiro (series 2) / Tracy-Ann Oberman (series 3) as Katie
- Robert Harley as Peter
- Joanna Brookes as Allison

== Episodes ==
=== Series 1 (2001) ===
No. overall	No. in series	Title	Original release date
1	1	"Birthday"	8 June 2001
Daniel's birthday approaches, and an old school party is planned.
2	2	"Writer's Block"	15 June 2001
When author April Prescott gets writer's block, Lucy and Daniel are lumbered with a rather unwelcome house guest.
3	3	"The Weekend"	22 June 2001
Lucy and Daniel want a quiet weekend to themselves, but things never work out quite as planned.
4	4	"Poker Night"	29 June 2001
Katie's baby is overdue, and everyone comes over for poker night.
5	5	"Promotion"	6 July 2001
Lucy is up for a promotion at work, but has to deal with Katie's baby blues.
6	6	"Godparents"	13 July 2001
Daniel and Lucy have been asked to be godparents, but are they right for the job?

=== Series 2 (2002) ===
No. overall	No. in series	Title	Original release date
7	1	"Get Fit"	14 June 2002
When the guys join the gym, Lucy and Katie have a big problem on their hands.
8	2	"Reunion"	21 June 2002
Lucy joins a school reunion site and reunites with an old friend.
9	3	"Quiet Night In"	28 June 2002
Why is Peter acting so strangely, and will Daniel and Lucy ever get their quiet night in?
10	4	"The Dinner Party"	5 July 2002
Daniel and Lucy host a dinner party.
11	5	"Baby Blues"	12 July 2002
The news that their best friends are expecting another baby produces an unexpected reaction in Lucy.
12	6	"Writer's Retreat"	19 July 2002
The men are left in charge of the baby while the ladies are off on a writer's retreat.

=== Series 3 (2003) ===
No. overall	No. in series	Title	Original release date
13	1	"Mr.Cheese"	17 October 2003
Daniel lands an advertising job, but just how much does he like his new boss?
14	2	"Golf"	24 October 2003
Daniel and Lucy go away on holiday, and come to a surprising decision.
15	3	"An Engagement"	31 October 2003
Change is in the air when Amanda and Richard put their happy lives together on the line by becoming engaged.
16	4	"Home"	7 November 2003
Lucy tells her parents she's pregnant.
17	5	"Home Improvements"	14 November 2003
With a new baby on the way it's time for some home improvements.
18	6	"House Guest"	21 November 2003
Have Daniel and Lucy finally had enough of dealing with other people's problems?
