= Emma Amos (actress) =

English actress (born 1964)

- Born: 18 August 1964 (age 61); Newcastle-under-Lyme, Staffordshire, England
- Occupation: Actress
- Years active: 1988–Present
- Spouse: Jonathan Coy (m. 1998)
- Children: 1

Emma Amos (born 18 August 1964 in Newcastle-under-Lyme, Staffordshire) is an English actress. She played Yvonne Sparrow in the last three series and 2016 special of time-travel sitcom Goodnight Sweetheart alongside Nicholas Lyndhurst, replacing original actress Michelle Holmes who held the role from 1993 to 1996. In 1992, she played Sherbet Gravel in Philip Ridley's stage play The Fastest Clock in the Universe.

== Life ==
Emma Amos trained at the Royal College of Music from 1982 to 1989, and in 1991 she landed a part in the British film Buddy's Song. Designed as a vehicle for the rising pop-singer Chesney Hawkes, the film also starred Roger Daltrey of rock band the Who as Terry, Buddy's dad. Amos was cast as Dawn, Terry's girlfriend, but featured in only a few brief scenes. Amos's first television role was "Phoebe", the talking phone, in the children's series Wizadora. She starred in eight episodes in 1991 for Oxford Press before the series was picked up by ITV, and Phoebe was re-introduced as a model phone. She starred in an episode of long-running sitcom Men Behaving Badly, playing Mandy, the annoying girlfriend of Tony's brother, in the episode "People Behaving Irritatingly".

Following a variety of supporting-part roles, Amos starred alongside Nicholas Lyndhurst in the time-travel sitcom Goodnight Sweetheart. Replacing Michelle Holmes midway through the show's six-series run, Amos took on the role of time-travelling bigamist Gary Sparrow's 1990s' wife, Yvonne.

Since then, Amos has appeared in several British television series, including Casualty, A Touch of Frost, Peak Practice, Midsomer Murders, The Bill, My Family and Doctors. She has also appeared in Heartbeat, in which she played Anita Hudson in the episode "Little White Lies", as well as the feature films Vera Drake and Bridget Jones's Diary. Amos also played Julie Davies in The Last Detective.

In January 2009, she appeared in a Churchill Insurance TV commercial. In 2016, it was announced that Amos, as well as her daughter Esme Coy, would appear in a one-off special return of Goodnight Sweetheart.

In June 2017, Amos appeared in the Chichester Festival Theatre production of Sweet Bird of Youth by Tennessee Williams.

== Filmography ==
=== Film ===
Year	Title	Role	Notes
1988	Rowing with the Wind	Joven Veneciana	
1990	A Ghost in Monte Carlo	Soprano	TV film
1991	Buddy's Song	Dawn	
1996	Secrets & Lies	Girl with Scar	
1997	Firelight	Ellen	
1998	The Tribe	Diana	
1999	Passion Killers	Dawn	TV film
2001	Bridget Jones's Diary	Paula	
2002	Not 360		Short film
2003	Blackball	Local News Reporter	
2004	Fur TV	Thea	TV film
2004	Vera Drake	Cynical Lady	
2010	Copier	Tina	Short film
2015	Scarlet Says	Rose	Short film
2015	Nightstand	Lady on the Train	Short film
2021	The Football Monologues	Kimberly	

=== Television ===
Year	Title	Role	Notes
1989	Hale and Pace	Pregnant Woman	Episode: "Series 2, Episode 2"
1992	Men Behaving Badly	Mandy	Episode: "People Behaving Irritatingly"
1992	Alas Smith and Jones	Various roles	2 episodes
1993	The Inspector Alleyn Mysteries	Sonia Orrincourt	Episode: "Final Curtain"
1994	Murder Most Horrid	Miss Fleming	Episode: "Overkill"
1994	Casualty	Anna Owen	Episode: "Family Ties"
1994–1995	Moving Story	Kathy	Series regular, 8 episodes
1995	The Bill	Trisha Rogers	Episode: "Allegations and Allegiances"
1996	Madson	Sam Connors	Episode: "Series 1, Episode 4"
1997	A Perfect State	Deidre	Series regular, 7 episodes
1997–1999	Goodnight Sweetheart	Yvonne Sparrow	Series regular, 31 episodes
1999	The Bill	Julia Marshall	Episode: "Ring-a-Ring O'Roses"
2000	Rhona	Linda	Episode: "The Rain"
2000	The Bill	Nicky Walker	Episode: "Caught Short"
2001	Peak Practice	Sandy Kelly	Episode: "Flesh and Blood"
2002	Rescue Me	Cathy	Episode: "Series 1, Episode 2"
2002	The Big Impression	Various roles	2 episodes
2003	A Touch of Frost	Emma Palmer	Episode: "Held in Trust"
2003–2007	The Last Detective	Julie Davies	Series regular, 16 episodes
2004	Heartbeat	Angela Price	Episode: "In Sickness and in Health"
2004	Casualty	Nina Barnes	Episode: "Emotional Rescue"
2004	Murder in Suburbia	Fiona Arundel	Episode: "Sanctuary"
2004	Midsomer Murders	Sandra Tate	Episode: "Dead in the Water"
2005	The Golden Hour	Kate Murray	Episode: "Series 1, Episode 4"
2005	Doctors	Terri Fisher	Episode: "Secrets & Lies"
2006	The Bill	Dawn Swanson	Episode: "Long Lost Conscience"
2006	Heartbeat	Anita Hudson	Episode: "Little White Lies"
2007	Five Days	Councillor Mrs. Hull	Episode: "Day Thirty Three"
2007	My Family	Joanna Draper	Episode: "Breaking Up Ain't Hard to Do"
2008	Agatha Christie's Poirot	Bessie Burch	Episode: "Mrs McGinty's Dead"
2011	Holby City	Julia Calder	Episode: "Love Thy Neighbour"
2012	Silent Witness	Trudie	Episode: "And Then I Fell in Love"
2013	Holby City	Katherine Howards	Episode: "Old Wounds"
2014	Doctors	Julie Daniels	Episode: "Judgement Day"
2016	Goodnight Sweetheart	Yvonne Sparrow	Episode: "Many Happy Returns"
2016	Doctors	Kate Croft	Episode: "Sins of the Father"
2018	Still Open All Hours	Mrs. Machin	Episode: "Series 5, Episode 2"
2019–2021	The Stand Up Sketch Show	Various	5 episodes

== Theatre credits ==
Year	Title	Role	Venue	Notes
1988	Snow White and the Seven Dwarfs	Snow White	Cambridge Arts Theatre, Cambridge	
1989	Apples	Delilah	Royal Court Theatre, London	
1989	Blue Heart	Dawn	National Theatre Studio, London	
1990	The Fantasticks	Luisa	Regent's Park Open Air Theatre, London	
1990	Much Ado About Nothing	Ursula	Regent's Park Open Air Theatre, London	
1991	The Marriage of Figaro	Fanchette	Watford Palace Theatre, Watford	
1992	The Fastest Clock in the Universe	Sherbert Gravel	Hampstead Theatre, London	
1992	Once a Catholic	Mary McGinty	Tricycle Theatre, London	
1993	The Deep Blue Sea	Ann Welch	Almeida Theatre, London	
1993	Somewhere	Linda	Liverpool Playhouse Studio, Liverpool	
1993	The Neighbour		National Theatre Studio, London	
1993	Poison Pen	Juliette Smith	Royal Exchange, Manchester	
1994	The Birthday Party	Lulu	Lyttelton Theatre, London	
1996	Grace Note		The Old Vic, London	
2001	The Servant	Susan	Lyric Theatre, London	
2003	Accidental Death of an Anarchist	Journalist	Donmar Warehouse, London	
2010	Hay Fever	Myra Arundel	West Yorkshire Playhouse, Leeds	
2011	Sixty-Six Books - In the Land of Uz		Bush Theatre, London	
2014	Variation on a Theme	Mona	Finborough Theatre, London	
2015	Ivanov	Martha Babakina	Chichester Festival Theatre, Chichester	
2017	Sweet Bird of Youth	Miss Lucy	Chichester Festival Theatre, Chichester	
2017	The Lady in the Van	Pauline	Theatre Royal, Bath	
2019	A Woman of No Importance	Mrs. Allonby	Everyman Theatre, Cheltenham	also, UK tour
