= The Sparrows =

The Sparrows may refer to:

- The Sparrows (Military Unit), the 79th Light Anti-Aircraft Battery, a Royal Artillery unit active during World War II
- The Sparrows (band), a Canadian 1960s blues rock band
- The Sparrows: a Study of the Genus Passer, a 1988 book by J. Denis Summers-Smith

== See also ==
- Sparrow (disambiguation)
