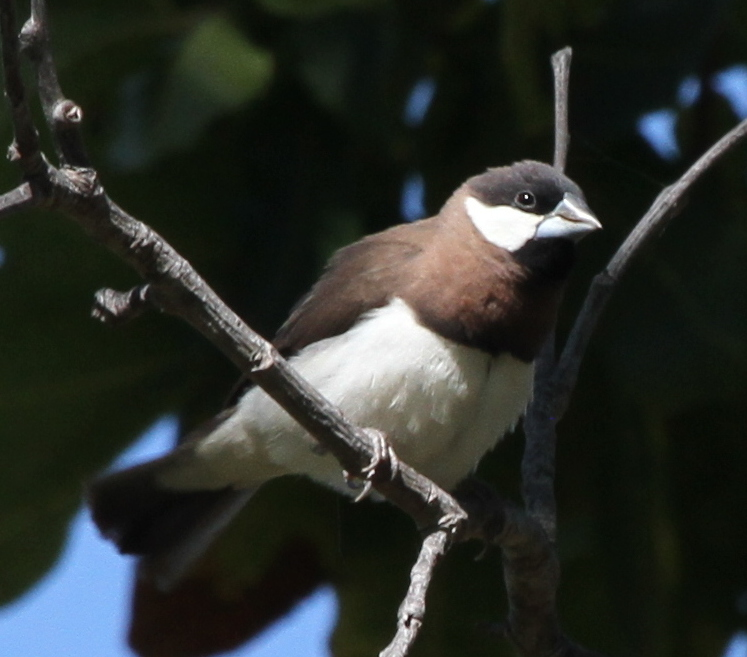
- Timor sparrow in Baucau Municipality, Timor-Leste

Conservation status
- Near Threatened (IUCN 3.1)

Scientific classification
- Kingdom: Animalia
- Phylum: Chordata
- Class: Aves
- Order: Passeriformes
- Family: Estrildidae
- Genus: Padda
- Species: P. fuscata

Binomial name
- Padda fuscata (Vieillot, 1807)

Synonyms
- Lonchura fuscata Vieillot, 1807

= Timor sparrow =

Species of bird

The Timor sparrow (Padda fuscata), also known as Timor dusky sparrow, is a small passerine bird. The bird inhabits the grasslands and lowlands of the Timor archipelago with its distribution typically sparse. Its diet consists mainly of rice and seeds and is considered a rice pest in Timor-Leste.

The Timor sparrow is closely related to the Java sparrow and is listed as near threatened on the IUCN Red List of Threatened Species.

== Taxonomy ==
It was formerly classified in the genus Lonchura, and some taxonomists still place this species, along with the Java sparrow, in that genus.

== Description ==
The Timor sparrow is an approximately 14 cm (5.5 in) long, plump dark brown songbird with a large silvery-blue bill, white cheek, pink feet and creamy-white belly. Both sexes are similar. Its appearance resembles the closely related Java sparrow, but it is smaller and has different coloured plumage.

== Distribution and habitat ==
The Timor sparrow is restricted to Timor-Leste, West Timor, and the nearby islands of Semau and Rote. While it occurs widely throughout this range, its distribution tends to be sparse and patchy. In certain localities, the species can be moderately common. For example, surveys along the Laivai River in Timor-Leste documented several groups of 30 to 50 birds within a small area over a short timeframe, indicating that the total population in that region likely numbers in the thousands. Local reports have also noted flocks ranging from several hundred to thousands of individuals.

The Timor sparrow primarily inhabits the extreme lowlands but may be found at elevations up to around 700 metres. It is generally observed alone or in small groups of three to five birds, sometimes associating with mixed flocks of other seed-eating species. The species forages on or near the ground in a variety of habitats including grassland, lightly wooded cattle pastures, scrub, overgrown gardens, and degraded deciduous or monsoon forests, as well as along the margins of cultivated land. In Timor-Leste, it has been recorded in Eucalyptus alba savanna, rice paddies, heavily degraded coastal shrublands, and riparian woodlands dominated by Casuarina species.

== Relationships with humans ==
Considered a significant rice pest in Timor-Leste, the species has likely benefited from the expansion of rice cultivation, which provides prolonged access to grains and water.

Due to ongoing habitat loss, limited range and illegal trapping for cage-bird trade, the Timor sparrow is evaluated as near threatened on the IUCN Red List of Threatened Species.
