= Goodnight Sweetheart (TV series) =

British TV sitcom (1993–2016)

- Title card (1993–1999)
- Genre: Sitcom; Science fiction
- Created by: Laurence Marks; Maurice Gran
- Developed by: Alomo Productions
- Directed by: Terry Kinane; Robin Nash; Nic Phillips; Martin Dennis
- Starring: Nicholas Lyndhurst; Michelle Holmes; Dervla Kirwan; Emma Amos; Elizabeth Carling; Victor McGuire; Christopher Ettridge
- Theme music composer: Ray Noble; Jimmy Campbell; Reg Connelly
- Opening theme: "Goodnight Sweetheart"
- Country of origin: United Kingdom
- Original language: English
- No. of series: 6
- No. of episodes: 59 (list of episodes)

Production
- Executive producers: Claire Hinson; Allan McKeown; Jon Rolph
- Producers: John Bartlett; Nic Phillips; Humphrey Barclay
- Production locations: London, England; Dock10 (2016)
- Running time: 30–45 mins
- Production company: Alomo Productions

Original release
- Network: BBC1
- Release: 18 November 1993 – 2 September 2016

Goodnight Sweetheart is a British science fiction time travel sitcom, starring Nicholas Lyndhurst, created by Laurence Marks and Maurice Gran, and produced by the BBC. The sitcom is about the life of Gary Sparrow, an accidental time traveller who leads a double life through the use of a time portal, which allows him to travel between the London of the 1990s and the London of the 1940s during the Second World War. The sitcom's creators, who also created Birds of a Feather and The New Statesman, wrote most of the plots for the episodes.

The sitcom premiered on BBC1 on 18 November 1993, and ran for six series, until its conclusion on 28 June 1999, with repeats after this date being aired on ITV3, Gold, Drama, Yesterday and Forces TV on Sky Digital. Lyndhurst's involvement in the sitcom allowed him to win the Most Popular Comedy Performer at the National Television Awards in 1998 and 1999. On 2 September 2016, the sitcom received a one-off special entitled "Many Happy Returns", following events after the final episode. The sitcom itself later received a musical adaptation in 2017.

== Premise ==
Goodnight Sweetheart is about the life of Gary Sparrow (Nicholas Lyndhurst). In 1993, Gary works as a TV repairman, who struggles with his life and the marriage to his ambitious wife Yvonne. He is best friends with Ron Wheatcroft, a printer whose marriage is on the brink of collapse. On attending a TV repair call-out in London's East End, Gary inadvertently discovers a time portal at Duckett's Passage, which leads to wartime London. There, he meets Phoebe Bamford, a barmaid who works in the Royal Oak pub, her father Eric, who runs the pub, and Reg Deadman, a dim-witted but friendly policeman. Gary strikes up a relationship with Phoebe. He finds he can use the time portal to travel between the 1990s and the 1940s and he uses it to continue seeing Phoebe. To ensure his visits do not interfere with history, Gary brings in assistance from Ron as a confidant, to aid him with problems and to supply him with 1940s five-pound notes and identity documents.

Gary soon finds himself leading a double life. When visiting Phoebe, he explains his absences through working as a secret agent, using his knowledge of future wartime events to his advantage in the deception, also claiming to be a singer-songwriter, passing off modern pop songs as his own, and supplies many items from the present that were rationed in wartime Britain. When with Yvonne, Gary initially claims his absences to be major call-outs for his work but after losing his job in 1995 to buy and run a shop called "Blitz 'n' Pieces" – selling goods he acquires in the 1940s as rare memorabilia, to maintain access to the time portal in the present – he uses it to lie that he has to be absent to conduct buying trips for stock.

Over the next five years, Gary's life is further complicated by his relationship with the two women. Phoebe eventually takes over the running of the Royal Oak after the death of her father Eric, later marrying Gary, despite him committing bigamy. (Gary rationalises this with the technicality that – because of his travels between eras – he isn't married to two women at the same time.) His marriage with Phoebe results in a son, Michael. Gary moves into a luxury flat in Mayfair, with Reg becoming a doorman in their building after retiring from the police. Yvonne becomes pregnant, only to suffer a miscarriage but she later becomes successful with her organic beauty products, opening a company and transforming into a millionaire, allowing her and Gary to own a luxury apartment. Ron later faces a divorce, losing his home and control of his printing company; Gary eventually allows him to have the lease for his Mayfair flat in the present. During his time in the past, Gary has encounters with several historical figures, including Winston Churchill, George Formby, King George VI, and Noël Coward, dealing with some of the peculiar effects of time travel during various trips.

Goodnight Sweetheart eventually concludes in 1945 on VE Day. In 1999, Yvonne becomes suspicious of Gary's frequent absences and follows him to the shop, where she witnesses his disappearance through the time portal. Gary later becomes trapped in the past when the portal closes after he saves Clement Attlee from an assassination attempt by poisoning. He later deduces that it was his destiny to travel back in time with the purpose of saving Attlee's life and the portal closed because he had fulfilled this purpose. Gary is resigned to being forced to stay with Phoebe and their son, though he writes a message behind a strip of wallpaper of his Mayfair flat, knowing that Ron is redecorating it in 1999. Gary's writing appears before Ron and Yvonne, advising him to tell Yvonne everything. The final episode of the original series cuts to Yvonne standing at the gates of Blitz 'n' Pieces, wondering whether or not they would meet again, before being joined by Ron. In 1945, Gary is standing in Duckett's Passage, wondering the same, before being joined by Phoebe and Michael.

=== Many Happy Returns ===
In the one-off 2016 special, Gary is still married to Phoebe as they live through the 1960s with their son Michael, who is a teenager. Gary, missing the modern world, decides to visit the hospital where his younger self is being born but inadvertently encounters his father who faints, leaving him to hold his younger self. The incident causes Gary to be thrown into the future in the 2010s, arriving in the men's toilets of a trendy burger joint in east London, where his former shop was. During his visit, Gary meets Yvonne, now a multimillionaire investor, with Ron as her tenant in the basement. To his shock, Gary learns that Yvonne got pregnant before the closure of the time portal in 1999 and that he now has a 16-year-old daughter named Ellie. After meeting her, Gary contemplates living a double life again, upon finding a new time portal has opened, hoping to get to know his daughter, whilst still maintaining his life in the 1960s.

== Episodes ==
Series	Episodes	Originally released	
Series	Episodes	First released	Last released
1	6	18 November 1993	23 December 1993
2	10	20 February 1995	1 May 1995
3	11	26 December 1995	4 March 1996
4	11	3 March 1997	20 May 1997
5	10	23 February 1998	27 April 1998
6	10	18 April 1999	28 June 1999
Special		2 September 2016	

A total of 59 episodes were made, including a Christmas special in 1995 and a special in 2016. Marks and Gran, the creators, wrote the first series; many later episodes were written by other writers. As in Marks and Gran's sitcom Get Back, most episodes of Goodnight Sweetheart – and the programme – were named after popular song titles, others being derived from film titles. The show is named after the song "Goodnight, Sweetheart", a popular song of the 1930s and 1940s, popularised by Al Bowlly in 1931; it was later sung by Nick Curtis as the series signature tune. During one episode Gary and Phoebe refer to Bowlly's death during the Second World War. Because of a script-editing error, two episodes (series one, episode six and series four, episode two) were both titled "In the Mood". There is no special connection between these two episodes.

== Cast ==
Actor	Role	Episodes	Series	Years
Nicholas Lyndhurst	Gary Sparrow	59	1–6 and 2 specials	1993–99, 2016
Victor McGuire	Ron Wheatcroft	59	1–6 and 2 specials	1993–99, 2016
Christopher Ettridge	P.C. Reg Deadman / P.C. Deadman (Grandson)	56	1–6 and 2 specials (Not in 1x02, 1x04, 2x04)	1993–99, 2016
Elizabeth Carling	Phoebe Bamford / Sparrow	32	4–6 and 1 special	1997–99, 2016
Dervla Kirwan	Phoebe Bamford / Sparrow	27	1–3 and 1 special	1993–96
Emma Amos	Yvonne Sparrow	31	4–6 and 1 special (Not in 4x04)	1997–99, 2016
Michelle Holmes	Yvonne Sparrow	27	1–3 and 1 special	1993–96
David Ryall	Eric Elward	6	1	1993
Roger Sloman	George Sparrow	1	4	1997
Liam Jeavons	George Sparrow	1	1 special	2016
David Benson	Noël Coward	6	5–6	1998–99
Eve Bland	Majorie Hook / Deadman	7		1996-1999
Ian Lavender	Michael Sparrow	1	5	1998
Tim Preston	Michael Sparrow	1	1 special	2016
Nimmy March	Stella Wheatcroft	4		1995-1996
Esme Coy	Ellie Sparrow	1	1 special	2016

== DVD releases ==
All six series and the 1995 Christmas Special have been released on DVD in the UK (Region 2), with music edits made to certain episodes. The Christmas special was released on the DVD of the third series. The first five series have been released in Australia (Region 4).

DVD Title	No. of discs	Year	No. of episodes	DVD release		DVD Interview
DVD Title	No. of discs	Year	No. of episodes	Region 2	Region 4	DVD Interview
Complete Series 1	1	1993	6	4 February 2005	3 June 2009	Laurence Marks & Maurice Gran (Creators)
Complete Series 2	2	1995	10	26 September 2005	3 June 2009	Christopher Ettridge (Reg Deadman)
Complete Series 3	2	1995 & 1996	11	23 January 2006	17 September 2009	Dervla Kirwan (old Phoebe)
Complete Series 4	2	1997	11	22 May 2006	2 June 2011	Emma Amos (new Yvonne)
Complete Series 5	2	1998	10	24 July 2006	2 August 2011	David Benson (Noël Coward)
Complete Series 6	2	1999	10	18 September 2006	—	Elizabeth Carling (new Phoebe)
Complete Series 1–6	11	1993–99	58	23 October 2006	—	All of the above

- Although the 2016 special "Many Happy Returns" is only available in a complete box set in Australia, which is region 2, no UK release of the episode has surfaced; it was released digitally in September 2016 on the BBC Store.

== Future ==
The show's writers and producers have stated they have received thousands of emails and letters regarding the show wishing for its return to the small screen. Laurence Marks and Maurice Gran have both stated that while there are no plans to bring the series back, it might possibly come back if the musical is made and is a success. On 5 July 2016 it was announced that the show would be returning to BBC One for a one-off special, as part of the BBC's "landmark sitcom season". Unlike the original series, which was filmed in London, it was filmed and produced at dock10 studios, in Salford Quays. Marks and Gran wrote the script and Lyndhurst returned to the role of Gary Sparrow. The special episode aired on 2 September 2016 on BBC One. It received a positive response.

=== Musical ===
Since 2014 there was talk of Goodnight Sweetheart being turned into a musical and in December 2017, dates for a stage musical were announced. This jukebox style musical would feature songs from the 1940s and 1980s with the world premiere taking place at the Brookside Theatre, Romford in September 2018.

=== Continuation novel ===
In July 2025, a Kickstarter campaign was successfully funded, allowing Marks and Gran to write a novel titled Many Happy Returns. Licensed by Fremantle Media and published by Idiot Box Books, the novel will serve as a seventh series.
