= Christopher Ettridge =

English actor

Christopher Ettridge (born 21 February 1948) is an English actor and director born in Isleworth, London.

== Career ==
Ettridge is best known for his role as dim but good-natured police officer Reg Deadman in the time-travelling comedy series Goodnight Sweetheart, which aired between 1993 and 1999 and returned for a special edition in 2016. He has also had roles in EastEnders, The Bill, Harry Enfield and Chums, Kevin and Perry Go Large, Julius Caesar, and Hitler: The Rise of Evil. He has been directing as well as acting in recent years. He directed a production of Romeo and Juliet for ReACTion Theatre in Eastbourne.

== Filmography ==
=== Film ===
| Year | Title | Role | Notes |
|---|---|---|---|
| 1978 | Rapunzel Let Down Your Hair | Mr. Heron | |
| 1984 | The Chain | Removal Man | |
| 2000 | Kevin & Perry Go Large | Postman | |
| 2003 | I Capture the Castle | Station Bystander | |
| 2012 | Demon | Pr. Darkwood | |

=== Television ===
| Year | Title | Role | Notes |
|---|---|---|---|
| 1981 | Antony & Cleopatra | Scarus | Television film |
| 1981 | Roger Doesn't Live Here Anymore | Man in waiting room | Episode #1.3 |
| 1982 | Terry and June | Evans | Episode: "Something to Get Alarmed About" |
| 1983 | The Professionals | 2nd Interrogator | Episode: "A Man Called Quinn" |
| 1983 | Nanny | Bally | Episode: "Into the Blitz" |
| 1984 | The Glory Boys | Duggan | Episode #1.1 |
| 1984, 1985 | Juliet Bravo | Dr. Cattrell | 2 episodes |
| 1986 | Death Is Part of the Process | Constand Viljoen | Television film |
| 1987 | One by One | Van Druten | Episode: "The Monkey in Between" |
| 1989–1992 | The Bill | Supt. Brookes / Doctor | 4 episodes |
| 1990 | Harry Enfield & Chums | Joseph Goebbels | Episode #1.3 |
| 1991 | Bye Bye Columbus | Francisco Roldán | Television film |
| 1991, 1994 | Casualty | Eric Dunn / Ronald | 3 episodes |
| 1992 | Love Hurts | Colin Sterne | Episode: "A Day in the Life" |
| 1992 | Lovejoy | Auctioneer | Episode: "Kids" |
| 1993 | Minder | Jehovah's Witness | Episode: "Uneasy Rider" |
| 1993–2016 | Goodnight Sweetheart | Reg / Isambard Deadman | 57 episodes |
| 1994 | Hard Times | Miner | Miniseries |
| 1995 | Harry | Rivers | Episode #2.1 |
| 1995 | The Old Curiosity Shop | Sampson Brass | Television film |
| 1997 | Bramwell | Mr. Fairfax | Episode #3.3 |
| 1998–2002 | EastEnders | Graeme / Ollie | 7 episodes |
| 1999 | Esther | Hathach | Television film |
| 2000 | The Worst Witch | Terry Root | Episode: "Green Fingers and Thumbs" |
| 2001 | Doctors | Gordon Collins | Episode: "Neighbours |
| 2003 | Hitler: The Rise of Evil | Kurt von Schleicher | 2 episodes |
| 2011 | EastEnders: Greatest Exits | Graeme | Television film |
| 2015 | Mr Selfridge | Mr. King | Episode #3.10 |
| 2016 | Birds of a Feather | Harvey | Episode: "Tonight I'll Be Staying Here with You" |
| 2018 | Nutritiously Nicola | Nicola's Dad | Episode: "Viral in the Bad Way" |
