= Mo-dettes =

English post-punk band

- Genre: Post-punk
- Years active: 1979–1982
- Past members: Kate Korris; Jane Crockford; June Miles-Kingston; Ramona Carlier; Melissa Ritter; Sue Slack

Mo-dettes were a multinational all-female post-punk band, formed in 1979 by guitarist Kate Korris, an original member of the Slits and brief member of the Raincoats, and bassist Jane Crockford, a former member of Bank of Dresden. Ramona Carlier (vocals) and June Miles-Kingston (drums) completed the line-up.

== Biography ==
Mo-dettes' best-known song is "White Mice", written by Jane Crockford, which was self-released as their first single in mid-1979 on Mode records, with "Masochistic Opposite" on the B-side. The song champions sexual autonomy, although the band members were critical of partisan feminist politics. The single was produced by David Cunningham and distributed by Rough Trade and was a hit on the indie charts.

Mo-dettes got further exposure on BBC Radio 1, DJ John Peel's show on 28 January 1980, broadcasting versions of "Norman (He's No Rebel)", "Dark Park Creeping", "Kray Twins" and "Bitter Truth". Further sessions followed on 26 August 1980 and 11 July 1981.

The band signed to Decca Records subsidiary Deram and released one album, The Story So Far, (Deram Records SML-1120) in November 1980. The album chiefly consisted of pop-punk originals, as well as covers of the Rolling Stones' "Paint It Black" and Édith Piaf's "Milord". Also in 1981, billed as Bomberettes, they provided backing vocals on the track "Fighter Pilot" on John Cale's album Honi Soit. The band had a minor hit with "Paint It Black", just missing the top 40.

The band's final record was "Tonight", released in June 1981 and a minor hit. For this single, Decca Records had asked the band to alter their sound to "traditional saccharine girl pop" leading to some tension. Two months later, also at the request of Decca Records, who wanted to hear a fuller sound, Mo-dettes asked guitarist Melissa Ritter to join. She played her first show as a Mo-dette just four days after joining the band. In February 1982, Carlier left and Crockford sang for a couple of months. In May 1982, Sue Slack replaced Ramona on vocals, before Mo-dettes disbanded permanently on 11 November 1982.

Bassist Jane Crockford was married in 1980 to Daniel Woodgate of the ska band Madness. The marriage lasted for 15 years. June Miles-Kingston first returned to the studio when she played drums and sang backing vocals on Fun Boy Three's "Our Lips Are Sealed", and in the late 1980s as the drummer for the Communards. Miles-Kingston is the sister of the former Tenpole Tudor guitarist Bob Kingston.

== Discography ==
=== Album ===
- The Story So Far – 1981

=== Singles ===
- "White Mice" (1979) – Mode Records
- "Dark Park Creeping" (1980) – Deram Records b/w "Two Can Play"
- "Paint It Black" (1980) – Deram – UK No. 42
- "Tonight" (1981) – Deram – UK No. 68
- "Kray Twins" (1981) – Human Records HUM10 – Live recorded at The Marquee /b-side: White Mice

== Personnel ==
- Kate Korris (Korus) – guitar – (born in the United States)
- Jane Crockford (Perry Woodgate) – bass
- Ramona Carlier (now Ramona Wilkins) – vocals (from Switzerland)
- June Miles-Kingston – drums
- Melissa Ritter – guitar
