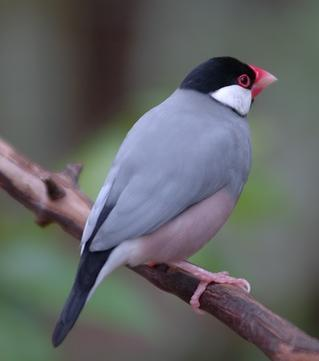
- Java sparrow (Padda oryzivora)

Scientific classification
- Kingdom: Animalia
- Phylum: Chordata
- Class: Aves
- Order: Passeriformes
- Family: Estrildidae
- Genus: Padda; Reichenbach, 1850

Type species
- Loxia oryzivora Java sparrow Linnaeus, 1758

Species
- See text.

= Padda =

Genus of birds

Padda is a genus of estrildid finches restricted to islands in southern Indonesia and Timor-Leste.

These are small, plump, gregarious passerine birds. They frequent open grassland and cultivation and feed mainly on grain and other seeds, including rice.

Both species have white-cheeked black heads and thick bills. The sexes are similar, but immature birds have brown upperparts and paler brown underparts and cheeks. The call of both species is a chip, and the song is a raid series of call notes chipchipchipchipchipchip.

== Taxonomy ==
The genus Padda was introduced in 1850 by the German naturalist Ludwig Reichenbach for the Java sparrow. The word "Padda" was used as an English name for the Java sparrow by George Edwards in 1743 and may come from the Malay word padi meaning "rice".

=== Species ===
The genus contains the following two species:

Genus Padda – Reichenbach, 1850 – two species
Common name	Scientific name and subspecies	Range	Size and ecology	IUCN status and estimated population
Java sparrow	Padda oryzivora (Linnaeus, 1758)	Java	Size: Habitat: Diet:	EN
Timor sparrow	Padda fuscata (Vieillot, 1807)	Timor	Size: Habitat: Diet:	NT

The Java sparrow is a popular cagebird, and has been introduced in a large number of other countries. Both Padda species are threatened by trapping for the cage bird trade. Many taxonomists now place this genus in Lonchura with the mannikins and munias.
