= John Sparrow =

John Sparrow may refer to:

- John Sparrow (MP) (by 1516–1545/1546), MP for Ipswich
- John Sparrow (translator) (1615–1670), English academic, barrister, translator of the works of Jakob Böhme
- John Sparrow (academic) (1906–1992), English academic, barrister, book-collector and Warden of All Souls College, Oxford
- John Sparrow (footballer), English football left-back
- John Sparrow (musician), member of the band Violent Femmes

== See also ==
- Jack Sparrow, the main protagonist of the Pirates of the Caribbean film series
