= Morning Parade =

English alternative rock band

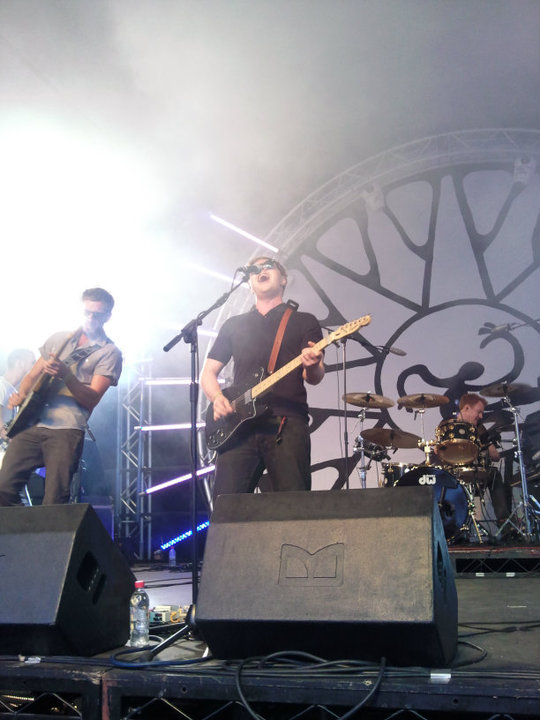
- Morning Parade performing in 2010

Background information
- Origin: Harlow, Essex, England
- Genres: Alternative rock, indie rock
- Years active: 2007–2014
- Labels: Parlophone; Astralwerks
- Past members: Steve Sparrow; Chad Thomas; Phil Titus; Ben Giddings; Andy Hayes

Morning Parade were an English five-piece alternative rock band from Harlow, Essex that formed in 2007 before signing with Parlophone in 2010. Its self-titled debut album was released early in 2012. The line-up was composed of Steve Sparrow (lead vocals, piano and guitar), Phil Titus (bass), Chad Thomas (guitar), Ben Giddings (piano/synths), and Andrew Hayes (drums). The band broke up on 4 December 2014.

== Early days and formation ==
Steve Sparrow and Phil Titus met as students at Burnt Mill Academy in Harlow. They later worked together as labourers. Steve then met Chad Thomas at Harlow College in 2003. The three formed an experimental rock band called Anotherstory which featured Sparrow on lead vocals, piano and guitar, Titus on bass and backing vocals and Thomas on guitar and piano. The other two members were Mike Pope (guitar) and Charles Gadsdon (drums). Gadsdon now owns artist management company, The QE Company. The group's first single, called Traffic, was released independently prior to breaking up in 2007.

After the split, Sparrow toured the independent music scenes of Harlow and Bishop's Stortford. During this time, he met Andy Hayes (formerly of 13palms) and Ben Giddings, who became the final two members of Morning Parade that year. They started out away from the public eye, instead focusing on songwriting. When they began gigging in 2008 it took fewer than 20 dates before they were approached by a record label. The band eventually signed to Parlophone in May 2010.

Their name stems from the days when Titus was working as a plasterer and Sparrow was his labourer. It required early morning starts and travelling, which they referred to as doing the 'morning parade'.

== Early tours ==
On 29 November 2010, Morning Parade announced their 2011 UK tour. Following a number of UK shows they toured Europe with The Wombats. Their UK dates included the V Festival in Chelmsford, a few miles from Harlow. A planned performance at the Belgian Pukkelpop festival in August 2011 was cancelled after the venue was hit by an unusually heavy storm, which collapsed trees, tents and stages, killing several people.

In 2012, Morning Parade performed on The Tonight Show with Jay Leno in the US and at Hyde Park in London for the torch relay which opened that year's Olympic Games. Between October and December 2012 the band toured the United States, opening for The Smashing Pumpkins. One such show at the Barclays Center in New York was shot in 3D.

== Debut album ==
Morning Parade's eponymous debut album was released on 5 March 2012, following the release of singles "Under The Stars", "A&E" and "Us & Ourselves". It was recorded at 13 Studios, owned by Blur and Gorillaz frontman Damon Albarn, and in collaboration with producer Jason Cox.

On 8 December 2011, Morning Parade played the album in full at London's Camden Barfly to a small group of fans. On 6 February the following year, a month before its physical release, the album was made available on Spotify.

The track listing was as follows:

1. "Blue Winter"
2. "Headlights"
3. "Carousel"
4. "Running Down The Aisle"
5. "Us & Ourselves"
6. "Under The Stars"
7. "Close To Your Heart"
8. "Half Litre Bottle"
9. "Monday Morning"
10. "Speechless"
11. "Born Alone"
12. "Youth"

== Airplay, press and critical acclaim ==
"Under the Stars" was played on Zane Lowe's show on BBC Radio One, and released on 29 November 2010. It was also featured on The Vampire Diaries. The band released the video for "Under the Stars" on 2 December 2010 on YouTube. The song has been played on Radio 1, BBC 6 Music, XFM, Absolute Radio and Q Radio.

"Speechless" was featured on The Vampire Diaries, in the episode "We'll Always Have Bourbon Street", of season 4

"Shake the Cage", from their new album, Pure Adulterated Joy, was featured in Konami's football video game Pro Evolution Soccer 2015, having been earlier featured in an official trailer.

They have also received praise from MTV, Vogue., and AbsolutePunk.

== Breakup ==
In a Facebook posting, on 4 December 2014, the band announced they were breaking up.

Their former bass guitarist, Phil Titus, died on 9 March 2023, at the age of 36.

== Discography ==
=== Studio albums ===
- Morning Parade (2012)
- Pure Adulterated Joy (2014)

=== Extended plays ===
- Alienation (2013)

=== Singles ===
Year	Single	Peak chart positions	Album
Year	Single	US Alt	Album
2010	"Under The Stars"	–	Non album track
2010	"In The Name" (Vinyl release)	–	Non album track
2010	"Your Majesty" (Vinyl release)	–	Non album track
2011	"A&E"	–	Non album track
2011	"On Your Shoulders (Limited to 300 copies) "	–	Non album track
2011	"Us & Ourselves"	–	Morning Parade
2012	"Headlights"	16	Morning Parade
2013	"Alienation"	–	Alienation EP

=== Music videos ===
List of music videos, showing year released and directors
Title	Year	Director(s)
"Under The Stars (Cambridge Junction)"	2010	
"Under The Stars"	2010	
"A&E"	2011	
"Us & Ourselves"	2011	
"Headlights"	2012	Sherice Griffiths
"Carousel"	2012	
"Running Down the Aisle"	2012	
"Alienation"	2014	Christopher Mills
"Culture Vulture (Acoustic)"	2014	James Rhodes
"Reality Dream (Acoustic)"	2014	James Rhodes
