= List of Goodnight Sweetheart characters =

Characters from the British TV sitcom

Goodnight Sweetheart is a sitcom that ran for six series from 1993 to 1999 on BBC. It stars Nicholas Lyndhurst as accidental time traveller Gary Sparrow, who leads a double life after discovering a time portal, which allows him to travel from the 1990s to a war-torn London in the 1940s.

== Gary Sparrow ==
Gary Sparrow (Nicholas Lyndhurst) is a TV repairman in the 1990s in the London borough of Cricklewood, who accidentally discovers a time portal back to 1940s London.

Upon discovering he can return to the future, Gary uses his time travelling ability to jump between the past and the present. He starts a cross-time romance with landlady of the Royal Oak pub Phoebe Bamford while living his regular life in the 1990s with his wife Yvonne. Neither Yvonne nor Phoebe knows that Gary is a time traveller or an adulterer. Gary's only confidant is his modern day best friend and printer, Ron Wheatcroft. Ron is able to replicate items that Gary needs to get by in the past, such as period money and ration cards, whilst he also helps him present cover stories to Yvonne, although he performs the latter unwillingly.

Gary exploits his knowledge from the future by claiming to be a secret agent with classified information pertaining to the war. He also plays songs on the piano that post-date his 1940s' audience (for example, music by The Beatles) and then claims that he wrote them.

From Gary's point of view, both Phoebe and Yvonne become pregnant at the same time. While Yvonne's pregnancy ends in miscarriage, Phoebe gives birth to a son that she and Gary name Michael. During the pregnancy, Gary and Phoebe get married.

In his conversations with Ron, Gary rationalises that he is not a bigamist, even though he is married to two different women, as the two women are not alive at the same time. Gary considers himself faithful to both wives, and argues that "[his] wives exist in different temporal aspects of a four-dimensional space-time continuum", though Ron considers this to be a "typical bigamist's excuse".

Later episodes in the series found both of Gary's wives gaining notable success. In the present, Yvonne becomes a millionaire through the beauty aids business she founded, while in the past, Gary and Phoebe move to a posh part of town and Phoebe becomes a nightclub singer, as she and Gary become acquainted with Noël Coward, a famous English playwriter of that time.

In the programme's finale, Gary prevents an assassination attempt on future prime minister Clement Attlee, which leads to the time portal closing, leaving him stuck in the 1940s. He paints a final message to Ron and Yvonne on the same Mayfair flat wall that Ron will one day strip old wallpaper from and discover.

In the 2016 reunion set in the 1960s, Gary and Phoebe have since returned to the Royal Oak with the now-teenage Michael and Reg Deadman. Gary realises his birth is due to occur and remembers being told when he was born he was dropped on his head, and he chooses to be present at his birth. He encounters his father, who promptly faints after witnessing the birth, and is given his newborn self – triggering the time portal to reopen, and completing the paradox. Gary arrives in 2016 and discovers his shop has become a chain of cafés owned by the now-Lady Sparrow, a TV personality on Dragons' Den, with Ron as her personal assistant and driver. Gary also finds Yvonne had him declared dead and gave birth to their daughter Ellie, who was born after the time portal closed and who has never met her father.

Gary chooses to return to the 1960s whilst building a friendship with his daughter, resuming his time-travel exploits.

== Yvonne Sparrow ==
Yvonne (Michelle Holmes series one to three, Emma Amos four to six) is one of Gary's wives. Throughout the series, Yvonne is led to believe that Gary is travelling about the country searching out antiques for his memorabilia shop when he is actually making numerous trips back to the 1940s via a time portal he accidentally stumbled across. It is not until the final episode of the series that Yvonne is made aware that Gary is actually a time traveller who travels to war-torn 1940s London, and that he has a wife and child in the past.

Yvonne is corporate-minded, yet socially and environmentally aware. She eventually starts her own successful natural beauty aids business, though it does little to lessen her sense of insecurity about Gary, who seems to be absent and uncommitted to her needs.

== Phoebe Bamford ==
Phoebe Sparrow (née Elward; previously Bamford) (Dervla Kirwan series one to three, Elizabeth Carling four to six) is a 1940s barmaid who becomes one of Gary's wives. Throughout the series, Phoebe is unaware that Gary is both a time traveller and an adulterer.

Phoebe works at the Royal Oak, an East End public house owned by her father, Eric. She is married to a serving British soldier (Donald Bamford, who appears in two episodes) though she reveals to Gary that it is a loveless marriage made for convenience only. Eric takes a quick disliking to Gary: not only is he suspicious of his motives, but Gary looks like a slacker by comparison to Phoebe's military husband. When Donald briefly returns in series 3 it is implied that he had a lover called Steve who was killed in action.

Gary supplies Phoebe with items considered luxurious by World War II ration standards (such as chocolate, bananas, wine and stockings) and often uses these items as consolation gifts for his constant absences. Phoebe is initially impressed by what she perceives as Gary's glamorous lifestyle and stories of America, though she eventually tires of his excuses and does not accept the gifts as readily. Gary takes her to a VIP cocktail party and to dinner at the Savoy Hotel, but Phoebe's father is quick to remind her that she is a "married woman" whenever Gary visits.

At the end of the first series, Gary decides not to return to the 1940s. However, when the second series begins, Gary's modern day best friend and confidant Ron Wheatcroft persuades him to go back in time to invest some money so that they will be rich in the 1990s. The scheme fails but, while there, he accidentally meets Phoebe and rekindles their relationship. Phoebe's father has died in an air raid, and her husband has been imprisoned in a POW camp; during this time, Gary provides emotional support for her.

After Donald is killed in action, Gary and Phoebe marry and have a son they call Michael. She and Gary move to a posh part of town and Phoebe becomes a night-club singer, as she and Gary become acquainted with Noël Coward.

== Ron Wheatcroft ==
Ron (Victor McGuire) is Gary's best friend and confidante. As a master printer with his own business, Ron is able to provide Gary with appropriate war time currency and documentation.

Ron's fortunes dwindle as the show progresses. In the earlier series he is married to Stella (Nimmy March), a character who made few on-screen appearances, but the marriage ends in series 4. He is also forced to sell his business (though he remains at the company as an employee, working for Mrs. Flanagan (Pippa Haywood) who has a cameo appearance). Due to his playboy lifestyle, his flat and possessions are repossessed after the bank declines to extend his overdraft. His fortunes improve when he moves into the West End flat that Gary purchases for himself in the past. He has a brief relationship with the wealthy socialite Flic (Sonya Walger).

Gary and Ron have a co-dependent friendship; without Ron, Gary has no-one to aid him with his time-travelling problems or confide in, and Ron does not appear to have any friends other than Gary.

== Reg Deadman ==
Born in 1901, Reg Deadman (Christopher Ettridge) is a simple-minded East End policeman and close friend to Phoebe and her father, Eric. Reg is a regular patron of the Royal Oak and is eventually employed by Phoebe to help her run the pub when her father dies. Despite his sexual naivete, Gary is eventually able to introduce Reg to the son he never knew he had, Frankie, who is the result of Reg's affair with a bus conductress named Margie.

Reg takes Gary at his word when he says he is a secret agent for World War II and Hollywood songwriter. They become good friends.

Like Ron and Yvonne, Reg has relatives who interact with Gary in his travels through time; he is the only regular 1940s character to have a descendant of his shown in the 1990s (Ron's grandfather Albert Wheatcroft is seen in one episode). Reg's 1990s policeman grandson is the one who directs Gary into discovering the time portal in the first episode. Reg interacts with Gary and Yvonne occasionally, including one episode in which Gary, having spent time in the 1940s drinking, attempts to drive his Ford Escort van and is stopped by Reg's descendant, causing him to lose his driving license and be dismissed as a TV repair man. As a result, in later episodes, he opens his own business "Blitz and Pieces".

Gary also interacts with one of Reg's relatives during the one instance he travelled back to the 1880s. This relative is shown to be much smarter than Reg, adorned with mutton chops, and aggressively yet cynically on the trail of Jack the Ripper.

In one episode it is revealed that Reg is still alive in the 1990s, but living in a care home, where he has dementia.

== Eric Elward ==
Eric (played by David Ryall) is Phoebe's father and a staunch supporter of his king and country. He has fought in World War I and went "over the top" in the Battle of the Somme. At first, Eric believes Gary is a German spy, but withdraws the accusation when he is knocked out by his till tray and Gary revives him with the artificial respiration. For a while, Gary and Eric are on good terms, but Eric never appears to lose his underlying suspicion of Gary and is quick to remind Phoebe that she is still married to a serving British soldier whenever Gary visits. Eric is killed in a bombing later in the show.

== Michael Sparrow ==
Michael is the son of Phoebe and Gary, born at the end of Series 4. When first learning of Phoebe's pregnancy, Gary complains to Ron that there is "no bright side" as his child will actually be twenty years older than he is. Michael is in his fifties in one episode, "My Heart Belongs to Daddy", where he appears in the present day. He unwittingly visited Gary's Blitz and Pieces shop and appears to be poverty-stricken. Gary remedies the situation by setting up a trust-fund for Michael in the 1940s.

Adult Michael is played by Ian Lavender, who played Pike in another sitcom set in the Second World War, Dad's Army.

== Ellie ==
Ellie (Esme Coy) is Gary and Yvonne's delinquent teenage daughter. Gary and Ellie are unaware of each other's existence, as Yvonne only found out she was pregnant after Gary had become trapped in the past. Because of Yvonne's hectic lifestyle and lack of father, Ellie lives a rebellious teenage life. Yvonne has never revealed Gary's identity to her and insists Gary keeps the secret. Despite this, Ellie feels a genuine connection to Gary, telling him, without realizing his identity, she fully intends on meeting him.
