= Robert Sparrow =

Robert Sparrow may refer to:

- Robert Sparrow (1741–1822), English landowner and politician, member of parliament for Bedford
- Robert Sparrow (died 1528), member of parliament for Winchelsea
