= BBC Radio London =

BBC Local Radio station for London

Coordinates: 51.5185°N 0.1431°W

- London; England
- Broadcast area: Greater London
- Frequencies: FM: 94.9 MHz; DAB: 12A; Freesat: 718; Freeview: 713; Sky: 0129; Virgin Media: 937
- RDS: BBCLondn

Programming
- Language: English
- Format: Local news, talk and music

History
- First air date: 6 October 1970 56 Years ago
- Former names: BBC GLR (1988–2000); BBC London Live 94.9 (2000–2001); BBC London 94.9 (2001–2015)
- Former frequencies: 95.3 FM; 1458 MW

Technical information
- Licensing authority: Ofcom

Links
- Website: bbc.co.uk/radiolondon

BBC Radio London is the BBC's local radio station serving Greater London.

It broadcasts on FM, DAB, digital TV and via BBC Sounds from studios at Broadcasting House in Langham Place, London.

According to RAJAR, the station has a weekly audience of 548,000 listeners and a 0.9% share as of December 2023.

== History ==
=== 1970–1988: Radio London ===
Local radio arrived in London as part of the second wave of BBC local stations, following a successful pilot project headed by Frank Gillard, who on visiting the United States, discovered local radio stations of varying formats and brought the concept to Britain.

Test transmissions for the new local radio station were carried out from Wrotham, Kent, on 95.3 MHz in FM mono, relaying BBC Radio 1 (at the time broadcast only on medium wave), with several announcements informing listeners of the new service. On 6 October 1970, Radio London was launched, three years before commercial radio for Greater London in the guise of LBC. On 2 September 1972 the station began broadcasting on MW in 1972, on 1457 kHz (206 metres) from Brookmans Park and in 1973 the VHF frequency changed to 94.9.

BBC Radio London was the local station for the capital, although, in its early days, it relied heavily on news reports from other stations in the BBC network and often shared programming with BBC Radio 1 and BBC Radio 2. For several months after launch, the station was not able to play commercial records as no agreement had been reached over so-called needle time, which led to London listeners becoming acquainted with broadcast library music from outside the UK (including the Canadian Talent Library) and music from film soundtracks. A phone-in programme, Sounding Brass, was first presented by Owen Spencer-Thomas in 1977. Listeners were invited to choose a Christmas carol or hymn while a Salvation Army brass band stood by in the studio to play their request live. It later moved to BBC Radio 2 and was presented by Gloria Hunniford.

As soon as Independent Local Radio stations LBC and Capital London went on air, public attention to Radio London declined.

Radio London started regular broadcasts from Harewood House, 13 Hanover Square, near Oxford Circus, later moving to 35 Marylebone High Street – the former Radio Times warehouse.

Tests for FM stereo began in 1981 with Music on the Move, a programme featuring non-stop music, before its full launch on 11 February. The FM transmitter was shortly moved to Crystal Palace. This coincided with the planned relaunch in 1981, which saw the station take on a style that was softer than BBC Radio 2 – a station predominantly playing "easy listening" music. The music ranged from softer contemporary pop, such as The Carpenters, to light classical music. The relaunch led to improved audience figures and a string of awards and accolades.

One of its programmes on the schedule was Black Londoners, devised by Ray Criushank, a community relations officer for the London Borough of Hammersmith and Fulham, and presented by Alex Pascall. The programme helped to develop on-air talent from London's Afro-Caribbean community, namely Juliet Alexander, Syd Burke and Mike Phillips and was the pioneering programme on television or radio to regularly speak to Black Londoners. The programme's title was changed to Black London shortly before Radio London closed. It was revived for a short time in 2003, with Pascall returning as a presenter. The forerunner to the BBC Asian Network was an Asian programme, London Sounds Eastern, presented by Vernon Corea who was appointed the BBC's Ethnic Minorities Adviser in the 1970s.

A programming relaunch in 1984 saw Radio London adopt the tagline "The Heart and Soul of London", with more soul music being played during the day. Tony Blackburn from BBC Radio 1 moved up the schedule to host a morning show. Regular Soul Night Outs were held initially in Kilburn but later in other venues, such as Ilford. This was where Dave Pearce (who later went to BBC Radio 1) made his first regular appearances as a BBC DJ on a Monday night programme.

Radio London closed on 7 October 1988. The final programme, just before its 18th birthday, was presented by Mike Sparrow and Susie Barnes. Immediately after closedown at 7 pm, test transmissions began in preparation for the launch of its replacement, Greater London Radio (GLR).

=== 1988–2000: Greater London Radio (GLR) ===
Test transmissions for the new Greater London Radio GLR began as soon as Radio London closed. Its pre-launch announcements stated in no uncertain terms that GLR was to be radically different in style. GLR was to be the first new radio station in London for 15 years.

GLR logo 1991

Heading the new station were Managing Editor Matthew Bannister and Programme Organiser Trevor Dann. Bannister came from Capital London, while Dann came from Radio 1, via BBC TV's Whistle Test, and developed an album-oriented music policy. GLR was aimed at people who hate pop but love music, hate prattle (excessive on-air talk) but want to know what's what where in the world. The station was aimed at 25 to 45-year-olds. Early promotions used the phrase "rock 'n' rolling news". Much of the daytime speech output covered London events and nightlife, with comedians and other artists being interviewed. The music mix was best described as Adult album alternative, though indie bands were also played.

Chris Evans took on a variety of roles on GLR, often presenting a weekend show, ending in 1993. Danny Baker presented Weekend Breakfast from 1989 to 1990 and then returned to present a Sunday morning show from 1996 to 1998. Janice Long presented the Breakfast show on the station from 1989 to 1991, and Kevin Greening started as a producer in 1989, before becoming a presenter of the Breakfast show with Jeremy Nicholas in 1991. Bob Harris also presented shows for the station from 1994 to 1998 after leaving BBC Radio 1. Early afternoon programming previewed London's entertainment scene, interviewing comedians and other performers. Richard Cook had a Saturday night jazz show.

Specialist speech programmes in the evening were aimed at London's communities: Asian, Afro-Caribbean, Jewish, Gay, and Irish. Black London was replaced with Margaret Jones (aka The Ranking Miss P). Later, a programme for the gay community, Lavender Lounge, was launched. It was presented by comedian Amy Lamé. Weekends featured extensive sports coverage, centring on football and London's numerous clubs such as Arsenal, Tottenham, and West Ham United.

In 1989, GLR set up a youth-based radio training facility at Vauxhall College, SW8, which was followed by a second course based at White City, W12. This was allocated funds from the London Borough of Hammersmith and Fulham and the British parliament.

GLR had the ability to directly access Scotland Yard's network of traffic cameras across London's busiest streets. This enabled its reporters, most commonly "Bob at the Yard", to give accurate traffic and travel news to its listeners. The reports were known as 20/20 Travel, named because its travel reports were read out every 20 minutes during peak times. No other radio station had this access for a while, even managing to outdo Capital Radio's traffic plane, known as the Flying Eye.

==== Criticism and closure ====
Three years into the new relaunch, the station was given an additional three years to prove itself to its audience by senior BBC management or close for good; this threat was also applied to its other metropolitan BBC local radio stations BBC WM in Birmingham and BBC GMR in Manchester. The threat was lifted after the BBC deemed it sufficiently patronised to remain on-air; however, criticism of the station grew from its Radio London days, causing David Mellor, then Secretary of State for Culture, Media and Sport to remark: "The BBC must think hard whether it is occupying radio frequencies without making much use of them." This claim was rejected by senior management.

In 1991, Matthew Bannister left to spearhead the BBC's charter-renewal strategy called Extending Choice. He was replaced as Managing Editor by Trevor Dann. Kate Marsh was appointed News Editor. In 1993, GLR was forced to relinquish its 1458 kHz medium wave frequency, for a new commercial radio station, which was eventually won by Sunrise Radio. Previously it had been simulcasting with 94.9 MHz FM, with a few programmes which occasionally opted from FM. In 1993, Nigel Chapman, Head of BBC South & East, drove through a policy of "speech shoulders", forcing GLR to drop its music / speech mix at breakfast and drive times. Dann resigned in protest and left the BBC.

Steve Panton, formerly Managing Editor of BBC Radio Solent, took over at GLR in 1993. One of its noted DJs on-air at the time was Gary Crowley, who had a weekend show which regularly showcased new and unsigned bands. Kaleem Sheikh presented the A to Z of Indian Film and Classical music to a mainstream and specialist audience.

In 1999, following a consultation exercise on local broadcasting in the South East, the BBC decided to rebrand GLR and substantially change the programming. A campaign to "Save GLR" was organised and a petition was delivered to the BBC. The argument became acrimonious. In particular, those opposed to the changes argued that the BBC never organised a public meeting in London as part of the consultation exercise and, when one was organised by supporters of the station, no one involved in the consultation exercise attended. Although the campaign was unsuccessful in saving GLR and the rebranding went ahead the next year, it demonstrated the existence of a loyal audience for its format. GLR's music format and several of its presenters returned to the BBC with the launch of the national digital station BBC Radio 6 Music in 2002.

=== 2000–2001: BBC London Live 94.9 ===
Facing even more public criticism over GLR's position in the London radio market and its very low listening reach, the station was relaunched on 27 March 2000 as BBC London Live 94.9. Promising even more speech and less music, London Live — originally the title for GLR's lunch-time news show (presented by Charles Carroll, now on BBC Radio 4) — was launched with new on-air personalities and new shows, including a speech-heavy breakfast show and a mid-morning phone-in and debate. Only Drivetime and the specialist shows would remain, albeit refreshed. The re-launch at the time was promoted by huge billboards and television spots on BBC Newsroom South East depicting London's famous landmarks as radio paraphernalia (a woman seen raising Big Ben as a radio aerial, for example). It cost the BBC in excess of £20 million, an amount seen by critics as an "obscene amount of money" and added to calls for the licence fee to be scrapped.

Leading the relaunch was Station Director David Robey, who hired such personalities as Lisa I'Anson, Vanessa Feltz, Tom Watt, and various black presenters including Eddie Nestor and Dotun Adebayo.

=== 2001–2015: BBC London 94.9 ===
BBC London 94.9 logo 2010

In October 2001, the name was changed to BBC London 94.9. Newly updated jingles were added with its new slogan "On TV, On Radio, Online", voiced by BBC London News host Emily Maitlis. The overall branding for this was BBC LDN.

New recruits to BBC London 94.9 included Jon Gaunt from BBC Three Counties Radio, former GLR presenter Danny Baker, and Sean Rowley (hosting the Guilty Pleasures show). Danny Baker hosted a breakfast show, which was co-hosted with American comedian Amy Lamé. Jon Gaunt then hosted the mid-morning phone-in show. Robert Elms was kept at lunchtime. Vanessa Feltz took over Lisa I'Anson's afternoon slot with a phone-in. Then there was Drivetime with Eddie Nestor and Kath Melandri, with news updates, sport, travel and debates with the public. Specialist programmes for the Black community emerged at the weekends along with sports coverage and alternative music shows in the evening. BBC London also saw the return of Tony Blackburn on Saturdays, more than 20 years since he first appeared on the station. His show was as before, playing classic soul music and chat.

Although having joined at the end of the station's time as GLR, Norman Jay's Giant 45 show attracted a large and loyal following until Jay's eventual departure in February 2008 having been moved to a "digital only slot". This was by no means the first change to specialist music programming by Robey to have attracted a negative reaction. In 2003, a campaign called Londumb Live was briefly launched as a response to the axing of a number of specialist shows including Coldcut and Ross Allen. Another presenter, Henry Bonsu, was controversially sacked for reportedly being "too intellectual".

BBC London 94.9 was the first BBC local radio station to air a 24-hour live-stream online, which coincided with the 2001 re-launch. It also aired on DAB Digital Radio (from July 2000) and on Sky channel 0152 (from 2005) in the London area, but it can be accessed within the UK and Ireland by manual tuning.

Additional coverage for football was made possible through a combination of its DAB platform, on Sky channel 0152, and via a BBC Essex transmitter on 765 kHz medium wave (for West Ham commentaries).

BBC Radio London logo, from 2020 to 2022

=== 2015–present: BBC Radio London ===
On 6 October 2015, BBC London 94.9 was re-branded as BBC Radio London.

On 23 March 2020, to prioritise resources during the Coronavirus pandemic, BBC Radio 5 Live suspended overnight programmes between 01:00 and 05:00 and carried the output of BBC Radio London. This continued until early July, when 5 Live resumed its overnight programming. In 2022, presenter Salma El-Wardany took over the Breakfast Show, after Vanessa Feltz left the station after almost twenty years. Following the departure of Salma El-Wardany, 5 Live Broadcaster Aaron Paul launched a new breakfast show on 6 January 2025.

== Programming ==
Local programming is produced and broadcast from the BBC's London studios.

During the station's overnight downtime, BBC Radio London simulcasts overnight programming from BBC Radio 5 Live.

While previous incarnations of the station offered a more diverse range of programmes for London's various ethnic, religious, social and cultural communities, specialist community programmes no longer feature on the station due to BBC local radio stations now targeting a broad, mainstream audience.
