= Guy Sparrow =

Guy Sparrow may refer to:

- Guy Sparrow (basketball) (born 1932), former NBA basketball player
- Guy Sparrow (cricketer) (1877–1958), English cricket player
