= David Spicer (writer) =

David Spicer is a writer, perhaps best known for his BBC Radio 4 comedy series. He has also written for game shows and panel shows and television comedies. He may also be the author of the play Superheroes, based on the protest group Fathers for Justice.

== Works ==
=== BBC Radio 4 comedy series ===
- Double Income, No Kids Yet (18 episodes, 2001–2003)
- Three Off the Tee (12 episodes, 2005–2006)
- Me and Joe (2008, an afternoon play)
- 28 Minutes to Save the NHS (4 episodes, 2002)

=== Game and panel shows ===
He has written for a number of games shows and panel shows, including:

- Win My Wage (2007)
- That'll Test 'Em (2006)
- Nobody Likes a Smartass (2003)
- No Win No Fee (2001)
- RTFP (short-lived Radio 4 panel game, 1998, co-written with Steve Gribbin)
- Quizland (BBC 7, a 21-part quiz series for children from 4 to 6 years old)
- Hot Gas (script editor)

=== TV comedy series ===
He has written for a number of comedy TV series including:

- Comedy Lab (1999)
- Give Your Mate a Break (1999)
- Armstrong and Miller (1997)
- Saturday Live (1996)
- Barrymore (1991)
