= Tom Sparrow =

Tom Sparrow may refer to:

- Tom Sparrow (Australian footballer) (born 2000), Australian rules footballer
- Tom Sparrow (Welsh footballer) (born 2002), Welsh association footballer
