= The Story So Far (Mo-dettes album) =

Studio album by Mo-dettes
- Released: 1980
- Studio: Horizon Recording Studios, Coventry
- Genre: Post-punk
- Label: Deram
- Producer: Roger Lomas

Professional ratings
Review scores
Source	Rating
AllMusic	4/5 stars
Smash Hits	4/10
Trouser Press	favourable

The Story So Far is the sole studio album by English band Mo-dettes, released in 1980 by record label Deram. It was re-released by Cherry Red Records in 2008 with bonus tracks.

== Track listing ==
All tracks composed by Mo-dettes; except where indicated

1. "Fandango"
2. "Satisfy"
3. "Dark Park Creeping"
4. "The Kray Twins"
5. "Paint It Black" (Mick Jagger, Keith Richards; arranged by Mo-dettes)
6. "White Mouse Disco"
7. "Bedtime Stories"
8. "Masochistic Opposite"
9. "Foolish Girl"
10. "Norman (He's a Rebel)"
11. "Sparrow"
12. "Mi'Lord" (Mustacchi Joseph, Monnot Margueritte Angele)

=== 2008 Bonus Tracks ===
1. "Bitta Truth"
2. "Two Can Play"
3. "Tonight" (Lee Hazlewood)
4. "Waltz in Blue Minor"
5. "White Mice"

== Personnel ==
Mo-dettes

- Ramona Carlier - vocals
- Kate Corris - guitar
- Jane Crockford - bass
- June Miles-Kingston - drums
