= Steve Sparrow =

English singer

Steve Sparrow was the lead vocalist for the English rock band Morning Parade. In 2003, Sparrow met Phil Titus at Burnt Mill Academy, and eventually met Chad Thomas at Harlow College. Together, they started a music group called Anotherstory. The other members were Mike Pope and Charles Gasdon. They broke up in 2007. In 2007, Sparrow began touring. In Harlow, he met Ben Giddings and Andy Hayes, who became the final two members of his band.

In December 2014, Morning Parade announced the end of their work together. Sparrow moved to Los Angeles, California, US, and works as a music manager.
