= The House Theatre of Chicago =

Theatre company in Chicago

- Founded: 2001; 25 years ago
- Dissolved: 2022; 4 years ago

The House Theatre of Chicago was a non-profit, ensemble theatre company in Chicago, Illinois. The House was founded in 2001 by a group of friends from the British American Drama Academy and Southern Methodist University with the mission of exploring the ideas of Community and Storytelling in order to create a unique theatrical experience for audience members. In its lifetime, The House received a total of 70 Jeff Awards and nominations. In 2007, The House became the first recipient of Broadway in Chicago's Emerging Theater Award. While they emerged from the 2020 COVID-19 pandemic with new leadership and a new direction, the theatre company exited the Chicago theatre scene in 2022.

== History ==
The House staged its first show, Death and Harry Houdini at the Live Bait Theatre in the Fall of 2001. Artistic Director Nathan Allen wrote and directed the show which starred company member Dennis Watkins in the title role.

The team followed with the critically acclaimed hit, The Terrible Tragedy of Peter Pan. Allen directed the production, written by company member Phillip C. Klapperich. The show was extended twice, running for five months.

The genre-bending Valentine Trilogy spanned three seasons and established the House's dedication to exploring the ideas of Community and Heroes through Storytelling and the use of music. The trilogy began with the critically acclaimed opening chapter of the Valentine Trilogy, San Valentino and the Melancholy Kid in winter 2004. Playwright and songwriter Allen crafted an epic rock 'n' roll drama about a small band of cowboys who hit the open range with more than cattle herding on their minds. A year later the company transported the story to feudal Japan for the samurai sequel, Curse of the Crying Heart. In 2006 the company mounted the concluding chapter, Valentine Victorious, which found reluctant hero Elliot Dodge taking on the corrupt streets of 1930s Chicago while battling his own demons.

The House found critical success again in 2006 with The Sparrow. Chicago Tribune Theatre Critic called it "a fresh, guileless, quirky and entirely lovable celebration of high school memories and small-town goodness, told in the accessible, youthful spirit of the iconic comic book." Following a sold-out run at the Steppenwolf Merle Reskin Garage Theater, the House remounted the show the following season at the Apollo Theatre.

The House Creative Team collaborated with the American Music Theatre Project and students at Northwestern University to develop the new musical Girls vs. Boys. The show premiered at the House in April 2010.

In 2014, The House was awarded the American Theatre Wing's National Theatre Company Grant.

In October 2020, Nate Allen announced that he was stepping down from his role as the House's Artistic Director. (He was the only person to hold this position in the company's twenty-year history.) This announcement followed the cancellation of House escape room productions Nova to Lodestar and The Last Defender. The COVID-19 pandemic had already force-furloughed most House staff. Allen estimated that the company could survive for another year under pandemic-related limitations, but he explained "what the House deserves is someone to really rebuild a company. I know what that is, but it's not me. That was a commitment I had in my 20s, but I don't have it now." Allen had immeasurable influence on the House and also on several generations of Chicago artists who encountered theatre through the House's signature maximalist style.

Lanise Antoine Shelley came on as Artistic Director in 2021 and saw through The House's final season. Of its final season, board president Renee Duba said "Thanks to the hard work and patience of so many—as well as the Shuttered Venue Operating Grant funding we qualified for—we were able to rise from the challenges of the initial pandemic hibernation and point the company in a new direction ... However, our strategic assessment looking to the future made it clear that we did not have the financial momentum or audience/donor support to continue beyond this fiscal year. We chose instead to maximize our current year programming and to honor all present commitments and partnerships with a thoughtfully planned exit from the Chicago theatre scene—and a wealth of pride in what the House Theatre of Chicago has accomplished."

== Production history ==
=== Season Zero ===
- Death & Harry Houdini '01
- The Terrible Tragedy of Peter Pan

=== Season One ===
- Death & Harry Houdini '03
- San Valentino and the Melancholy Kid
- The Rocket Man

=== Season Two ===
- Cave With Man
- Curse of the Crying Heart
- Dave DaVinci Saves the Universe

=== Season Three ===
- The Great and Terrible Wizard of Oz
- Valentine Victorious
- The Boy Detective Fails

=== Season Four ===
- Hope Springs Infernal
- The Sparrow
- Hatfield & McCoy
- Pop Theatre At The Old Town School

=== Season Five ===
- The Magnificents
- The Nutcracker
- The Attempters
- The Sparrow Returns
- The Secret Order of The Magic Pearl

=== Season Six ===
- Dave Davinci Saves the Universe
- The Rose and the Rime

=== Season Seven ===
- All the Fame of Lofty Deeds
- Wilson Wants It All
- Girls vs. Boys
- The Sparrow (Limited Engagement at Miami's Adrienne Arsht Center for the Performing Arts April 7 – May 1, 2011)

=== Season Eight ===
- Thieves Like Us
- Star Witness
- The Nutcracker
- Odradek

=== Other Productions ===
- Ellen Under Glass
- A Midsommer Night's Dreame
- Alice
- The Care Bears Movie: Live in Concert
- Newsies: Live in Concert
- Tremors: Edited for TV
- Nice Guys Finish Last: Collaboraction's Fable Party
- Defy Gravity: Museum of Science and Industry
- Millennium Park Audio Installation
- Beginners Guide to Camping
- San Valentino and the Melancholy Kid: Theatre on The Lake
- Curse of the Crying Heart: Theatre on The Lake
- The Great and Terrible Wizard of Oz: Northlight Theatre
- Hero, Dragon, Pearl: The First Annual Gathering of The Secret Order of The Magic Pearl
