= The Sparrow (2007 play) =

The Sparrow is a 2007 play written by Nathan Allen, Chris Mathews and Jake Minton. It is about an orphaned high school girl with supernatural powers who survives a deadly train accident. She must learn to deal with her emotions in order to control her powers and help others in need.

== Plot ==
Ten years ago, the second graders' bus crashed into a train at a crossing. Emily Book was the only survivor. She moved away and attended another school, and is now returning to Spring Farm High for her senior year. Emily has no living family, so Joyce McGuckin allows Emily to live in the McGuckin household. Joyce's daughter, Sara, was one of the children killed in the bus crash.

Emily is initially nervous at school but she soon befriends the biology teacher, Mr. Christopher. He introduces her to Jenny McGrath, class president and captain of the cheerleading squad. During PE, the other students gang up on Emily and throw dodgeballs at her. To defend herself, Emily briefly stops time with her mysterious powers. The powers go unnoticed and the gym teacher sends all the students to detention.

Emily shows up to detention, shocking the other students, as she did not participate in the dodgeball game. This moment of the play brings up many feelings and memories for the students as well as Mr. Christopher.

At the homecoming basketball game, the Spring Farm High Sparrows face off against their rivals, the Greenview Hornets. The Hornets' banner hangs over the gym due to their past victory over the Sparrows. At halftime, the cheerleaders enact a dangerous plan to throw Jenny to the ceiling so she can tear the Hornets' banner down. She gets stuck on the banner and Emily flies to her rescue, thus revealing her powers publicly. She is praised for her bravery, and becomes popular.

Mr. Christopher's biology class dissects fetal pigs and Emily uses her powers to make the Mr. Christopher and the students dance with the pigs.

At the homecoming dance, Emily sees Mr. Christopher kissing Jenny. Out of jealousy, Emily attacks Jenny with her powers. Jenny later realizes that Emily could have caused the bus accident years ago, by magically pushing the bus onto the train tracks. The next day in class she publicly asks Emily if she caused the accident. Emily says nothing, and runs from the room.

Soon the entire town turns against Emily. Joyce asks Emily if she caused the accident, and Emily replies "I didn't mean to". Joyce blames her for the death of Sara, and Emily runs away. When Jenny sees Mr. Christopher trying to smuggle Emily out of town, she shoots Christopher. After hearing the gunshot, the townspeople arrive, knowing Emily's secret. Emily uses her powers to remove the bullet and heal Mr. Christopher. Emily then leaves on a train to Chicago, ending the play.

== Characters ==
- Emily Book: Has mysterious supernatural powers. Caused the bus accident that killed her second grade class. Socially awkward, intelligent, bookworm. Her superpowers reflect her emotions. She is not very popular with the students until she saves Jenny at the basketball game and reveals her powers to everyone. She reminds the people of Spring Farm of the bus accident and eventually helps them all to accept the tragedy and move on.
- Jenny McGrath: Head Cheerleader at Spring Farm High. Very popular but very insecure. Threatened by Emily's popularity among the students and with Mr. Christopher. Kisses Mr. Christopher at the homecoming dance. Shoots Mr. Christopher.
- Dan Christopher: Biology Teacher. Very popular with the students. Takes Emily under his wing when she moves back to Spring Farm. His wife, Jessica, was driving the bus that crashed.
- Joyce McGuckin: Hosts Emily when she returns to Spring Farm. Lost her own daughter, Sara, in the bus accident. Married to Albert, mother of Charlie.
- Albert McGuckin: Hosts Emily when she returns to Spring Farm. Owns a hardware store in town. Has a soft spot for Emily, even though she reminds him of his daughter Sara.
- Charlie McGuckin: Son of Joyce and Albert who refuses to like Emily.
- Principal Jim Skor: Principal of Spring Farm High School. Has a lot of school spirit.
- Coach Gerald Adams: Gym Teacher and Basketball Coach.
- The Driver: The only person outside the Book household to know Emily's powers. Wants Emily to tell the town what actually caused the bus accident.

Ensemble Roles:

Students: Brad Gomer, Jonathon Simpson, Skye Thompson, Stuart Edgarton, Louie Nash, Phoebe Marks, Michelle Allen, Shannon Baker, Carol Schott, Evy Sullivan

Adults: Sherriff Rosenthal, Grandmother (Emily's Grandmother, appears in a flashback), Margaret Rosenthal (married to the Sheriff), Allison McGrath (Jenny's mother), Elizabeth Gilbert, Mark Gilbert, Tammy Adams (wife of Coach Adams)

== Production history ==
The House Theatre of Chicago (2007)

Glenbard East High School (2009)

Greater Boston Stage Company (2009)

Renegade Theater Company, Duluth, MN (2010)

Maine South High School (2016)

Wayzata High School, Plymouth, MN (2017) - Directed by Sonia Gerber

Greater Boston Stage Company (August 13–15, 2021)

Portage Central High School (October 29-November 7, 2021)- Starring Carter Barnes, Andrew Klesper, Sam Davis, Noah Aiello, Victoria Ryan, Ari Potluri and Ashley Bowen with production help from Jess Pike

University of Wisconsin: Milwaukee; Peck School of the Arts (November 2–6, 2022)- Directed by Marcella Kearns ,

== Reception ==
The play has received positive reviews. Time Out Chicago called it "probably [House Theater's] most aesthetically satisfying show to date." Edge said of the play: "it could very well make you rethink everything you know about theatrical productions".
