= Mike Sparrow =

British radio presenter

- Born: Michael Anthony Sparrow; 29 November 1948; Winchester, Hampshire, England
- Died: 4 January 2005 (aged 56); Hampstead, London, England
- Occupation(s): Radio broadcaster, author
- Known for: Presenter for BBC Radio London

Michael Anthony Sparrow (29 November 1948 – 4 January 2005), known as Mike Sparrow, was a producer and presenter for BBC Radio London.

== Early life ==
Michael Anthony Sparrow was born on 29 November 1948 in Winchester, Hampshire, to Margaret (née Hartley) and Freddie Sparrow. Sparrow graduated from the University of Cambridge with an MA in History and English. While at university, he edited all three major Cambridge newspapers. Sparrow acted in and directed plays, in addition to experimenting in films.

== Career ==
After graduating, Sparrow worked as a researcher and writer for the Mirror Magazine. He went on to work as a researcher for The Observer Supplement, Cosmopolitan and Angliya, a Russian cultural newspaper.

His radio career began in 1971 on BBC Radio London, working on arts and news programmes. He worked on Listen Children, a weekly story telling programme for the under 7s with Helen Dickson and David Simmons. In 1973, Sparrow took over production and presentation of the weekend film programme Close-Up. The same year, he took over presenting the evening magazine show Breakthrough from Steve Bradshaw. Sparrow presented Breakthrough, an influential music programme with a combination of progressive music, community news, poetry and interviews, for 15 years.

Sparrow presented various radio programmes on BBC Radio London including a jazz programme, an afternoon magazine programme and, from 1975, a midday phone-in show Call-In. At the start of 1976, he briefly presented the breakfast programme, Rush Hour, before moving to host a weekday evening an arts and entertainment programme Look, Stop, Listen! from September 1976. In 1978, Sparrow presented Rocks Off!, a weekly programme featuring the best of folk and rock, and in 1979 he presented Weekend What's On. Sparrow also hosted a mid-morning phone in, The Mike Sparrow Telephone Programme from January 1981, and drive-time programmes Not Mike Sparrow's music and Sparrow Over London between 1983 and 1988.

On 7 October 1988, Radio London closed and was relaunched as Greater London Radio (GLR). The final Radio London programme was presented by Sparrow and Susie Barnes, ending at 7pm.

Outside of broadcasting, in 1972 Sparrow wrote a series of children's stories entitled Frump the Dinosaur. He also wrote and recorded Christmas stories for the 'dial-Santa' service for the London Telephone area in the 1970s, alongside Tom Vernon, which children were able to hear at home by dialling a special telephone number. Sparrow was also involved in local community events such as compering charity galas, judging the London Children's Art competition, and attending the Mary Boon School prize-giving in West Kensington where his aunt, Miss Margaret Sparrow, was Headmistress

== Death and legacy ==
Sparrow died on 4 January 2005 at his home in Hampstead, London, aged 56. His funeral was held on 20 January 2005 at All Saints Church, Upper Clatford, Andover.

The British Library hold the Mike Sparrow Collection, the first audio collection to be preserved as part of the library's Unlocking Our Sound Heritage project in 2017. The collection, made available by Sparrow's executor Anthony Daniels, includes music, reviews, current affairs features and interviews from shows he worked on.
