= Elizabeth Carling =

English actress

- Born: 20 October 1967 (age 58); Middlesbrough, North Riding of Yorkshire, England
- Occupation: Actress
- Years active: 1987–present

Elizabeth Carling (born 20 October 1967) is an English actress and singer best known for her performances in Boon, Goodnight Sweetheart, Barbara, and Casualty.

== Career ==
In 1987, Carling made her screen debut in the film Out of Order, as Liz. She has appeared in The Bill twice, firstly as Miss White, the hotel receptionist in the 1987 episode "Overnight Stay", and subsequently as Maria Saunders in 1992 episode "Users". Her first major television role was in Boon as Laura Marsh, assistant to Ken Boon, she appeared in 40 episodes between 1989–91. In 1996 she played Wendy in Crocodile Shoes II: as the fiancée of Jed Shepperd, she appeared in all six episodes of the six-part series. The same year she appeared in the Men Behaving Badly episode "Home Made Sauna" as Carol where she reunited with her former Boon co-star Neil Morrissey.

In 1997, Carling took over the role of Phoebe Bamford (later to become Phoebe Sparrow) in the last three series of the time travel sitcom Goodnight Sweetheart. The part was originally played by Dervla Kirwan. After the series, she released an album of wartime covers also titled Goodnight Sweetheart. Phoebe Sparrow is one of her favourite roles. It returned for a special edition in 2016 with Carling reprising the role of Phoebe.

Between 1999 to 2003, she played Linda, the daughter of the eponymous matriarch in the ITV sitcom Barbara. She appeared in 24 of the series' 29 episodes, playing opposite her on-screen husband, Martin Pond (Mark Benton). In March 2003, she joined the cast of Casualty for a six-week run playing consultant neurologist Selena Donovan. The character was brought back in 2004 at the start of the show’s nineteenth season. Carling remained in the role for three full years, departing at the end of the twenty first season in 2007 when her character was killed off in a dramatic shooting.

In 2009, she played Barbara Clough in The Damned United, playing the role of the wife of Brian Clough (played by Michael Sheen) in a film focusing on events from 1967 to 1974 when Brian Clough was manager of Derby County and finally with his ill-fated 44 days in charge of Leeds United. In 2016, she narrated the second series of Bear Grylls: Mission Survive on ITV.

Between 2022 to 2024, she played Betty Scanlon in the period drama series Hotel Portofino. In December 2024, she appeared as Karla Hammond in Death in Paradise, the first episode to feature the new lead character Mervin Wilson (played by Don Gilet).

== Selected Filmography ==
Year	Title	Role	Notes
1987	The Bill	Miss White	Episode: "Overnight Stay"
1987	Out of Order	Liz	Film
1989 – 1991	Boon	Laura Marsh	40 episodes
1990	Screen One	Esther Frasier	Episode: "Frankenstein's Baby"
1992	The Bill	Maria Saunders	Episode: "Users"
1994	Medics	Anna Mordant	Episode: "All in the Mind"
1996	Crocodile Shoes II	Wendy	6 episodes
1996	Men Behaving Badly	Carol	Episode: "Home Made Sauna"
1997 – 1999/ 2016	Goodnight Sweetheart	Phoebe Sparrow (nee Bamford)	32 episodes
1999 – 2003	Barbara	Linda Pond	24 episodes
2000	Border Cafe	Charlotte	8 episodes
2000	The Secret	Connie Wheatley	3 episodes (TV mini-series)
2003 – 2007	Casualty	Selena Donovan	127 episodes
2005	Holby City	Selena Donovan	Episode: "Deny Thy Father" (Part 2)
2009	The Damned United	Barbara Clough	Film
2011	Vera	Bev MacDonald	Episode: "The Crow Trap"
2015	Inspector George Gently	Edith McDonald	Episode: "Son of a Gun"
2018	Agatha Raisin	Maggie Henderson	Episode: "The Wizard of Evesham"
2018	Doctors	Sandra Bates	Episode: "Shrine"
2022 – 2024	Hotel Portofino	Betty Scanlon	17 episodes
2024	Death in Paradise	Karla Hammond	Episode: "Christmas Special"

== Radio ==
Carling starred as Lucy in Radio 4's Double Income, No Kids Yet, which was written by David Spicer and also stars David Tennant, Meera Syal and Tony Gardner. The series was originally broadcast in 2001.

== Theatre ==
Her early stage work including productions with the National Youth Theatre. In 1992, Carling appeared as Janet in the UK tour of the musical The Rocky Horror Show. In February 2010, she starred as Steffy in the theatre production of I Ought to Be in Pictures. In 2012, she played Chelsea in a UK tour of On Golden Pond with the Middle Ground Theatre Company.

== Personal life ==
In 1991, Carling was briefly engaged to Neil Morrissey, whom she met while working on the ITV drama Boon and with whom she also appeared in an episode of BBC sitcom Men Behaving Badly.
