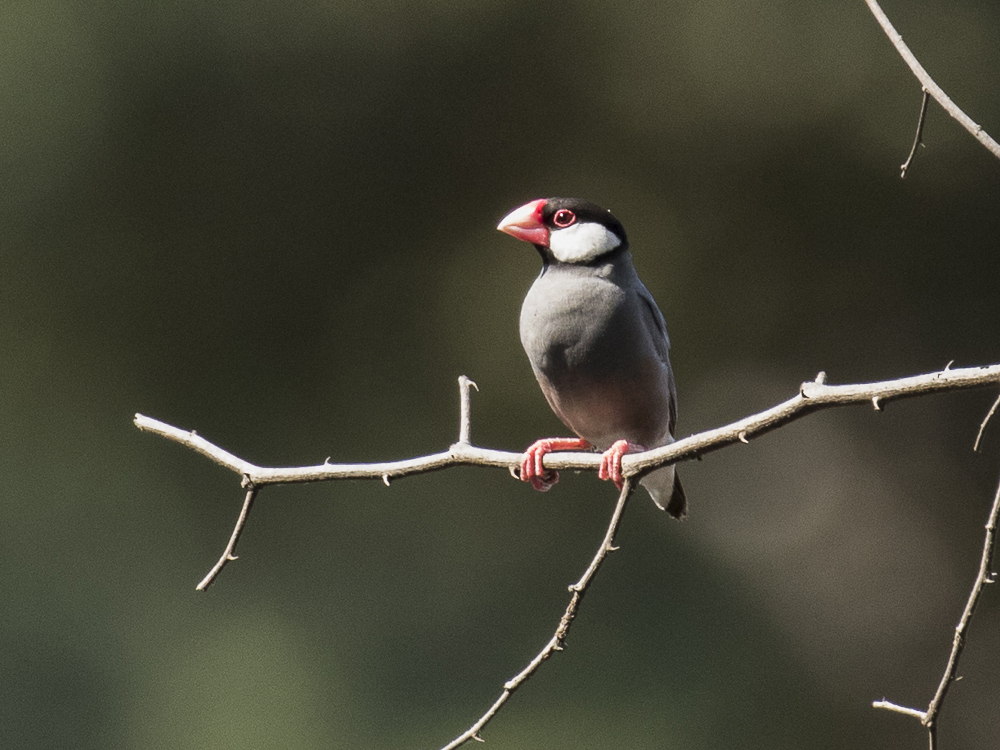
- In Baluran National Park, eastern Java

Conservation status
- Endangered (IUCN 3.1)
- CITES Appendix II

Scientific classification
- Kingdom: Animalia
- Phylum: Chordata
- Class: Aves
- Order: Passeriformes
- Family: Estrildidae
- Genus: Padda
- Species: P. oryzivora

Binomial name
- Padda oryzivora (Linnaeus, 1758)

Synonyms
- Loxia oryzivora Linnaeus, 1758; Lonchura oryzivora

= Java sparrow =

Species of bird

The Java sparrow (Padda oryzivora; syn. Lonchura oryzivora), also known as the Java finch, Java rice sparrow or Java rice bird, is a small passerine bird. This species in the family Estrildidae is a resident breeding bird in Java, Bali, and Bawean in Indonesia. It is a popular cage bird, and has been introduced into many other countries.

== Taxonomy ==
The Java sparrow was formally described by the Swedish naturalist Carl Linnaeus in 1758 in the tenth edition of his Systema Naturae under the binomial name Loxia oryzivora. The specific epithet combines Latin oryza meaning "rice" with -vorus meaning "eating". Linnaeus based his description on the "Padda or Rice-bird" that had been described and illustrated in 1743 by the English naturalist George Edwards in his A Natural History of Uncommon Birds. Edwards believed that his specimens had come from China but mentions the common name "Java sparrow".

The species was long classified in the genus Padda, but on the basis of preliminary genetic studies Padda was merged into the genus Lonchura in 2009, before being returned to its older generic status in 2020 following more detailed genetic analysis.

== Description ==
The Java sparrow is about 15 to 17 cm (5.9 to 6.7 in) in length from the beak to its tip of tail feathers. Although only about the size of a house sparrow, it may be the largest species in the estrildid family. The mean body weight is 24.5 g (0.86 oz), making it slightly heavier than its nearest known rival, the black-bellied seedcracker. The adult is unmistakable, with its grey upperparts and breast, pink belly, white-cheeked black head, red eye-ring, pink feet and thick red bill.

Both sexes are similar. Immature birds have brown upperparts and pale brown underparts, and a plain head. Very young birds have a black beak with a pink base.

The call is a chip, and the song is a rapid series of call notes chipchipchipchipchipchip.

Java sparrows produce distinct trill-calls in different behavioural contexts, according to a study by Furutani et al. (2018). These trill-calls, though acoustically similar, vary based on their repetition rate, which changes depending on the situation. In aggressive interactions, the sparrows emit faster trill-calls with higher sound pressure levels and entropy. In contrast, during affiliative behaviour, the trill-calls are slower and softer. This variation in trill-calls plays a crucial role in the birds' social communication, helping them convey different intentions based on the context.

== Habitat ==
The Java sparrow is a very gregarious bird which feeds mainly on grain and other seeds. It frequents open grassland and cultivation, and was formerly a pest in rice fields, hence its scientific name. The nest is constructed in a tree or building, and up to eight eggs are laid.

== Relation to humans ==
=== Aviculture ===
A couple of Java rice sparrows in a cage, 2023

The Java sparrow has been a popular cage bird in Asia for centuries, first in China's Ming Dynasty and then in Japan from the 17th century, frequently appearing in Japanese paintings and prints. Meiji-era writer Natsume Sōseki wrote an essay about his pet Java sparrow.

In the late 1960s and early 1970s the Java sparrow was one of the most popular cage birds in the United States until its import was banned. Today it remains illegal to possess in California because of a perceived threat to agriculture, although rice-dependent Asian countries like China, Taiwan and Japan have not regulated the bird.

In Asia the Java sparrow is most often raised almost from birth by human breeders and owners, and they become very tame and attached to humans. As such, they can be normally kept in relatively small cages, but let out for indoor exercise without their attempting to escape. In captivity, a variety of colours have been bred, including white, silver/opal, fawn/isabel, pastel, cream and agate (which currently is rare within European captive specimens) along with the pied Java sparrow called the sakura buncho in Japan.

=== Introductions ===
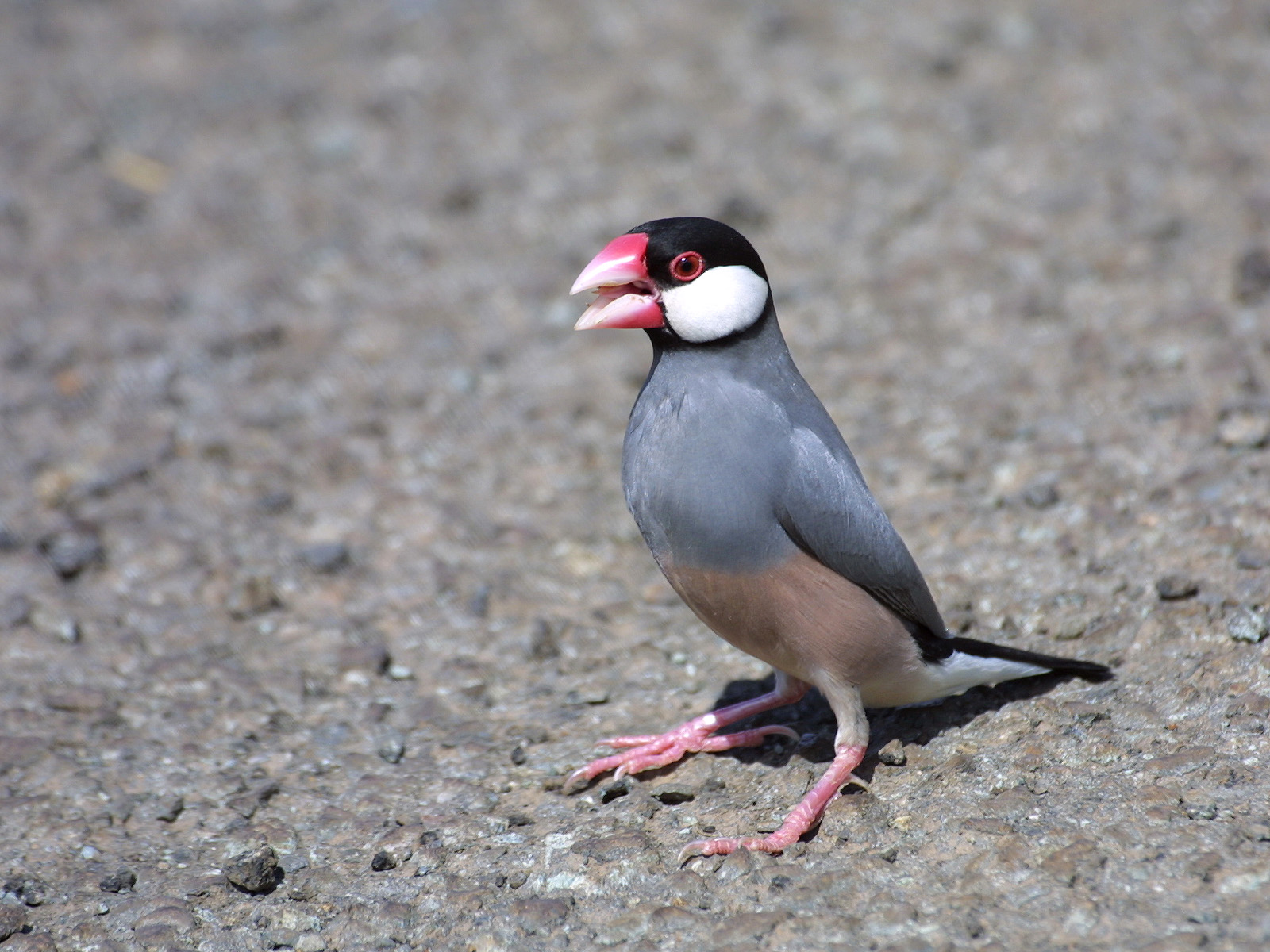
Adult in Hawaii

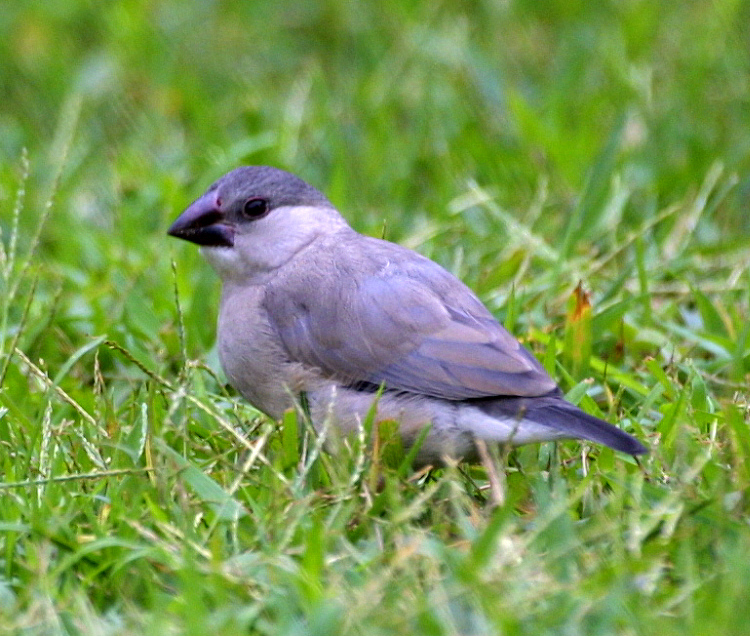
A juvenile in Hawaii with a black/dark-grey beak

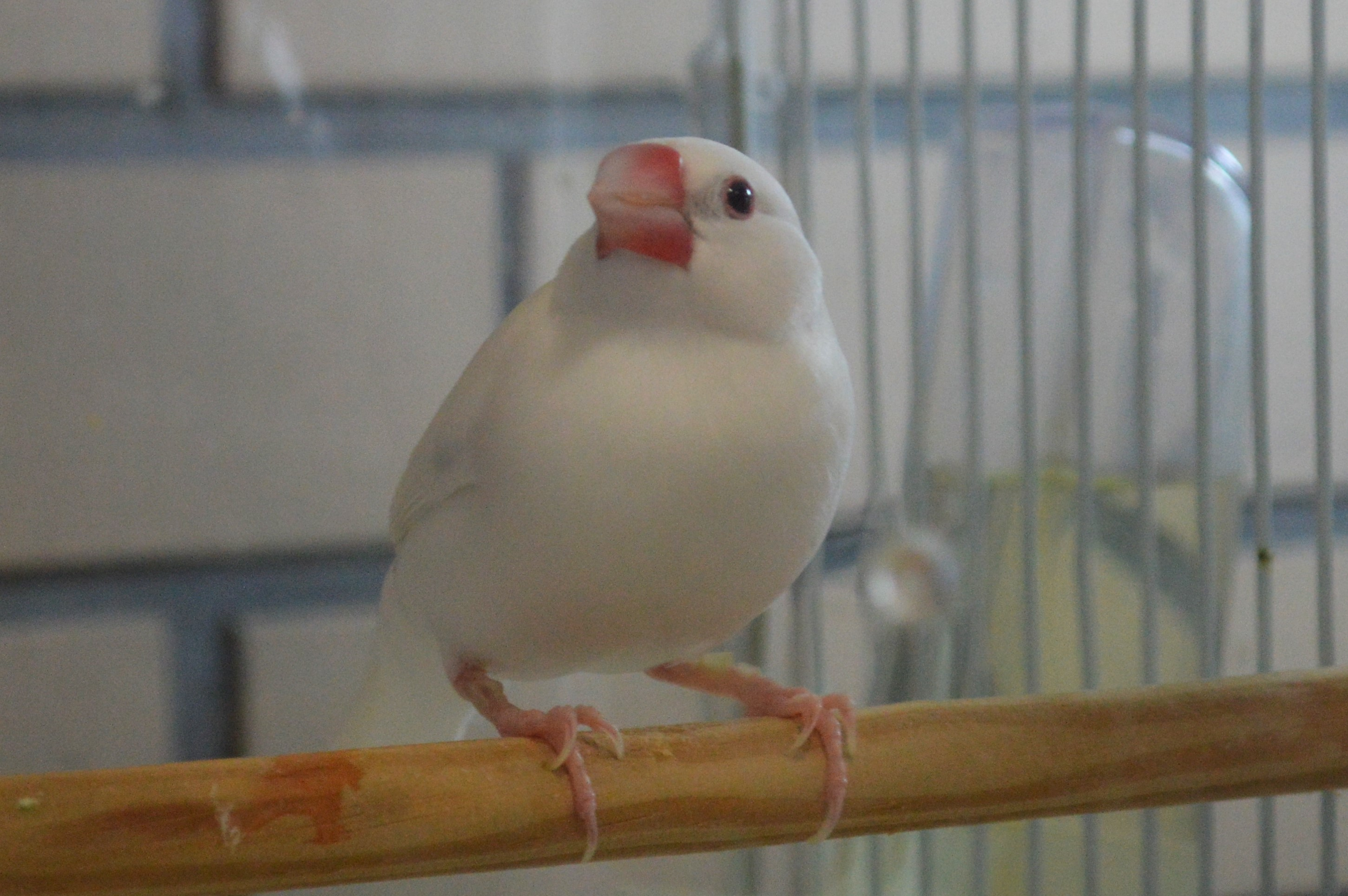
A white Buncho in Yatomi, Japan

The Java sparrow was introduced in the Indian subcontinent, but it failed to become a successful resident on the Indian mainland. In the United States there are breeding populations on several of the Hawaiian Islands, especially Oahu.

In the Caribbean, the Java sparrow was introduced to Puerto Rico where it is fairly common near San Juan. It has also been sighted in Jamaica, but is not known to occur on any of the other islands. It was also introduced to Christmas Island, off the coast of Western Australia.

=== Conservation ===
The Java sparrow is considered by some countries to be an agricultural pest with respect to rice cultivation. An ongoing loss of natural habitat, hunting in some areas and trapping (as a pest) in others has led to much smaller numbers in the wild and sightings in its natural range have become increasingly uncommon. The Java sparrow is now evaluated as endangered on the IUCN Red List of Threatened Species with less than 10,000 individuals remaining. It is also listed on Appendix II of CITES. The species is also severely threatened by the illegal exotic pet trade as they are sought after for their distinctive song, according to TRAFFIC.
