= Michelle Holmes =

British actress (born 1967)

- Born: Corinne Michelle Cunliffe; 1 January 1967 (age 59); Rochdale, Lancashire, England
- Occupation: Actress
- Years active: 1985–present

Michelle Holmes (born Corinne Michelle Cunliffe; 1 January 1967) is a British actress who has appeared on television most notably Coronation Street (1989–1990), Goodnight Sweetheart (1993–1996), Above Suspicion (2009–2012) and Hollyoaks (2017–2018).

== Early life ==
Holmes was born in Rochdale, Lancashire. She changed her professional name to gain entry to the actors' union Equity. Holmes performed in a pop band called the Dunky Dobbers.

== Career ==
Holmes' first acting role was in the ITV soap The Practice as Susan Turner, the receptionist. Originally, she was given a part as an extra, but after pestering the producers at Granada with multiple phone calls, she was given an audition for Susan, which was successful.

Holmes came to prominence as Sue, one of the babysitters in Rita, Sue and Bob Too who are seduced by an older man. A year later, she appeared as Goth Jenny in Damon and Debbie, and as Tina Fowler in Coronation Street. Holmes played Yvonne Sparrow in the first three series of Goodnight Sweetheart, and Maggie Coles in Firm Friends. She appeared as Marie in two series of Common as Muck. Holmes has appeared in Emmerdale twice: first in 1992 as Lindsay Carmichael, and in 1995 as bar manager Britt Woods.

In 2001, she played Connie Harper in Merseybeat, and guest starred in the BBC One school drama Waterloo Road as Lindsey Woodham. From July 2006 to August 2006, Holmes played Claudie Williams in The Chase, a BBC One drama. Holmes also stars as Genevieve in the ITV drama Life Begins. She played Theresa in the 2008 series of Shameless and DC Barbara Maddox in the 2009 production of Lynda La Plante's ITV crime drama Above Suspicion. In January 2001, Holmes played Pamela Fairbrother, and in August 2010 she played Eileen Needham in Heartbeat.

In March 2017, Holmes played Jude, a neonatal nurse, in the BBC One hospital drama series Casualty and, in April, she played Maggie Kinsella in the Channel 4 soap opera Hollyoaks. More recently, she has played café owner Mary in seasons 8 and 9 of Cold Feet. In October 2022, she portrayed Dora Booth in the BBC soap opera Doctors.

== Selected credits ==
- Rita, Sue and Bob Too as Sue (1987)
- Coronation Street as Tina Fowler (1989–1990)
- Goodnight Sweetheart as Yvonne Sparrow (1993–1996)
- Emmerdale as Britt Woods (1995)
- Merseybeat as Connie Harper (2001)
- The Chase as Claudie Williams (2006)
- Waterloo Road as Lyndsay Woodham (2007)
- Shameless as Theresa (2008)
- Above Suspicion as DC Barbara Maddox (2009–2012), TV series, 8 episodes
- The Road to Coronation Street as Brenda (2010)
- Midsomer Murders as Trina Nevins (2016), "Harvest of Souls"
- Hollyoaks as Maggie Kinsella/Greta (2017–2018), TV series, 28 episodes
- Cold Feet as Mary (2019)
- Doctors as Dora Booth (2022)
