= John Sparrow (footballer) =

English footballer

Personal information
- Full name: John Paul Sparrow
- Date of birth: 3 June 1957 (age 69)
- Place of birth: Bethnal Green, London, England
- Position: Left-back

Youth career
- Senrab
- Chelsea

Senior career*
Years	Team	Apps	(Gls)
1974–1981	Chelsea	63	(2)
1979	→ Millwall (loan)	7	(0)
1981–1983	Exeter City	62	(3)
- Sutton United
Total		132	(5)

International career
1972	England Schoolboys	8	(2)
1975	England Youth	8	(2)
- * Club domestic league appearances and goals

John Paul Sparrow (born 3 June 1957) is an English former professional footballer who played as a left-back.

== Club career ==
Born in Bethnal Green, Sparrow started his career with Senrab, before moving to Chelsea and signing professionally in 1974. He made his debut at the age of sixteen, in a 3–0 win over Burnley. Unable to ever tie down a first-team position, he was loaned to Millwall in 1979, and eventually sold to Exeter City in 1981 for £10,000. After two years with Exeter City, he moved to Sutton United.

Following his retirement, Sparrow went on to run The Oxford Arms in Hanworth Middlesex

== Personal life ==
He was the older brother of fellow professional footballer Brian Sparrow.
