= List of Shine on Harvey Moon episodes =

Shine on Harvey Moon is a British television series made by WitzEnd Productions and Central Independent Television for ITV from 8 January 1982 to 23 August 1985 and briefly revived in 1995 by Meridian Broadcasting. It was created by comedy writers Laurence Marks and Maurice Gran. The show ran for five seasons and principally starred Maggie Steed, Elizabeth Spriggs, Kenneth Cranham, Nigel Planer and Lee Whitlock. It had a total of 41 episodes.

== Series overview ==
Series	Episodes	Running time	Originally released	
Series	Episodes	Running time	First released	Last released
1	6	30 minutes	8 January 1982	12 February 1982
2	6	60 minutes	10 September 1982	15 October 1982
3	9	60 minutes	1 June 1984	27 July 1984
4	8	60 minutes	5 July 1985	23 August 1985
5	12	30 minutes	23 April 1995	18 August 1995

== Episodes ==
=== Series 1 (Early 1982) ===
All the half-hour episodes in series 1 were written by Laurence Marks and Maurice Gran, and directed by Baz Taylor.

No.	Title	Original release date
1	"The Conquering Hero"	8 January 1982
2	"Getting to Know You"	15 January 1982
3	"Who's Afraid of Virginia Lake"	22 January 1982
Harvey and Lou are demobbed.
4	"Sweet FA"	29 January 1982
Harvey meets his son Stanley's teacher.
5	"The Rough with the Smooth"	5 February 1982
Harvey's estranged wife is beaten up by one of her lovers. Harvey hopes to move back in.
6	"A Christmas Truce"	12 February 1982
Harvey works hard to make Christmas enjoyable.

=== Series 2 (Late 1982) ===
All the hour-long episodes in series 2 were written by Maurice Gran and Laurence Marks, and directed by Baz Taylor. There were new opening and closing title sequences.

No.	Title	Original release date
7	"Getting Results"	10 September 1982
Harvey has a job, but is it what he wants?
8	"A Deal with the Devil"	17 September 1982
Lou's black market activities come to the attention of the police. Rita has a new boyfriend.
9	"In Sickness and in Health"	24 September 1982
Harvey contemplates standing for election as a councillor. His mother falls ill. Maggie is pregnant.
10	"Party Line"	1 October 1982
Harvey stands for election, against Major Saxby.
11	"The Course of True Love"	8 October 1982
Harvey's girlfriend asks him to divorce his wife.
12	"Safe As Houses"	15 October 1982
Rita is offered a job in a top Mayfair club. Harvey's mother is trapped in her home by an unexploded bomb.

=== Series 3 (1984) ===
All episodes in series 3 were written by Laurence Marks and Maurice Gran, and directed by Baz Taylor.

No.	Title	Original release date
13	"Goodnight Sweetheart"	1 June 1984
14	"Pick Yourself Up, Dust Yourself Down And..."	8 June 1984
15	"Sisters and Brothers"	15 June 1984
16	"I'm Gonna Wash That Man Right Out of My Hair"	22 June 1984
17	"Sentimental Journey"	29 June 1984
18	"Goodnight Vienna"	6 July 1984
19	"Baby It's Cold Outside"	13 July 1984
20	"Fools Rush In"	20 July 1984
21	"Spring Will Be a Little Late This Year"	27 July 1984

=== Series 4 (1985) ===
All episodes in series 4 were directed by Baz Taylor, individual writers are noted below.

No.	Title	Written by	Original release date
22	"Kind Hearts and Coronets"	Laurence Marks and Maurice Gran	5 July 1985
23	"Anything Goes..."	Barry Lamoto	12 July 1985
24	"Mud Sticks"	Francis Megahy	19 July 1985
25	"Love Is Blind"	Alan Clews	26 July 1985
26	"Lover, Come Back to Me"	Alan Clews	2 August 1985
27	"All, or Nothing at All"	Francis Megahy	9 August 1985
28	"We're in the Money"	Alan Clews	16 August 1985
29	"Love and Marriage"	Laurence Marks and Maurice Gran	23 August 1985

=== Series 5 (1995) ===
The twelve episodes broadcast between 23 April and 18 August 1995 did not have individual titles.

No.	Title	Written by	Original release date
30	"Episode 1"	Laurence Marks and Maurice Gran	23 April 1995
31	"Episode 2"	Laurence Marks and Maurice Gran	30 April 1995
32	"Episode 3"	Gary Lawson and John Phelps	7 May 1995
33	"Episode 4"	Dick Clement and Ian La Frenais	14 May 1995
34	"Episode 5"	Dick Clement and Ian La Frenais	21 May 1995
35	"Episode 6"	Dick Clement and Ian La Frenais	28 May 1995
36	"Episode 7"	Sam Lawrence	14 July 1995
37	"Episode 8"	Sam Lawrence	21 July 1995
38	"Episode 9"	Alan Clews	28 July 1995
39	"Episode 10"	Alan Clews	4 August 1995
40	"Episode 11"	Geoff Rowley	11 August 1995
41	"Episode 12"	Laurence Marks and Maurice Gran	18 August 1995
