= Cluedo 2 – The Next Chapter =

2024 British comedy mystery stage play

Cluedo 2 – The Next Chapter Clue: The British Invasion
- Original language: English
- Written by: Laurence Marks and Maurice Gran; Yoni Weiss (North American adaptation)
- Based on: the board game Cluedo by: Hasbro; and the 1985 film Clue
- Characters: Miss Scarlett; Colonel Mustard; Mrs Peacock; Professor Plum; Reverend Green; Mrs White; Mr Black; Wadsworth; PC Silver
- Subject: Murder mystery
- Genre: Comedy mystery; farce
- Setting: Graveney Manor, England; 1968

Premiere
- Date: 29 February 2024
- Place: Richmond Theatre, London
- Directed by: Mark Bell
- https://www.cluedostageplay.com/

Cluedo 2 – The Next Chapter is a comedic stage play, characterised as a farce-meets-murder mystery, written by Laurence Marks and Maurice Gran, based on the Hasbro board game Cluedo (released as Clue in North America) and the 1985 Paramount Pictures film Clue. A sequel to the earlier stage play Cluedo (known as Clue: On Stage in North America), it had its world premiere at the Richmond Theatre in London on 29 February 2024 and subsequently toured the United Kingdom. The play is licensed for performance in North America by Concord Theatricals under the title Clue: The British Invasion, as adapted by Yoni Weiss.

== Background ==
The board game Cluedo (released as Clue in North America) was devised by Anthony E. Pratt, with artwork by his wife Elva Pratt, and was first published in 1949; it later inspired the 1985 film Clue and a stage play.

Cluedo 2 – The Next Chapter is a distinct work that serves as a sequel to the earlier stage play Cluedo. Rather than continuing a single storyline, it uses the familiar premise of the board game, the 1985 film and the first play to tell a new, self-contained murder-mystery story with new characters and a new setting.

== Synopsis ==
The play is set in 1968 at Graveney Manor, a Gothic mansion about an hour from "Swinging London". The ageing rock star Rick Black gathers a group of guests at the manor for a listening party for his newest album. Black is found murdered and the master tapes for the album disappear; the assembled suspects—among them Colonel Mustard, Miss Scarlett, Mrs Peacock, Professor Plum, Reverend Green, the housekeeper Mrs White and the butler Wadsworth—must work out which of them is the killer, echoing the structure of the board game.

== Characters ==
The characters are drawn from the board game and the earlier Cluedo productions, reimagined for the 1960s setting. The licensed edition's roles are:

- Miss Annabel Scarlett, an English redhead with an affected Liverpool accent and a mod style
- Colonel Mustard, a power-hungry American talent manager with a Southern drawl
- Professor Alex Plum, a timid man with a Somerset accent and a hippie air
- Mrs Celestine Peacock, a spoilt, self-styled aristocrat
- Reverend Hal Green, a Black American from Detroit and a Vietnam veteran
- Mrs White, a long-suffering Cockney cook and housekeeper
- Wadsworth, an English butler-turned-actor
- Rick Black, an English rock star with an affected Cockney accent, the host
- Patrick Gray, an English film director
- Sergeant Brown, a senior policeman
- P.C. Silver, a stolid constable
- Wadsworth Two, an actor playing a butler
- the Voice of the Radio Announcer, a British radio personality, which may be prerecorded

== Production ==
The play was written by the BAFTA Award–winning television writing partnership of Laurence Marks and Maurice Gran, whose credits include Birds of a Feather and Goodnight Sweetheart. It was directed by Mark Bell, who had directed the original UK stage production of Cluedo as well as The Play That Goes Wrong. The production was presented by JAS Theatricals, Gabriel Creative Partners, The Araca Group and Lively McCabe Entertainment. The set and costumes were designed by David Farley, with lighting by Jason Taylor and movement direction by Anna Healey.

=== Cast ===
The production was led by Jason Durr as Colonel Mustard and Ellie Leach, the 2023 Strictly Come Dancing champion and former Coronation Street actress, as Miss Scarlett. The original 2024 touring cast was as follows:

Character	Original touring cast (2024)
Miss Scarlett	Ellie Leach
Colonel Mustard	Jason Durr
Mrs Peacock	Hannah Boyce
Professor Plum	Edward Howells
Reverend Green	Gabriel Paul
Mrs White	Dawn Buckland
Wadsworth	Jack Bennett
Rick Black	Liam Horrigan
PC Silver	Tiwai Muza
Other roles/Understudies	Kara Alberts-Turner, Audrey Anderson, Henry Lawes

Helen Flanagan had originally been announced to play Miss Scarlett, but withdrew before the tour on medical advice, with Leach taking over the role.

== Tour ==
Following its premiere at the Richmond Theatre on 29 February 2024, the production embarked on an extended UK tour that ran until November 2024. Venues on the tour included theatres in Salford, Hull, Milton Keynes, Bath, Sheffield, Nottingham, Newcastle, Glasgow, Southampton, Cardiff, Norwich, Truro, Cheltenham and Birmingham, with a second autumn leg visiting Leeds, Bromley, Southend, Worthing, Guildford, Darlington, Blackpool, Aylesbury, Eastbourne, New Brighton, Fareham and Northampton.

== Reception ==
Reviews of the touring production were mixed to positive. Reviewing the Brighton run for The Reviews Hub, the critic described the play as "lovingly made and beautifully produced, a knowing spoof that manages to be hilarious and irreverent whilst keeping you intrigued with its twisting, ridiculous mysteries", and praised the set design and the choreographed scene changes. Sue Hull of What's On gave the production four stars when the tour reached the Alexandra Theatre in Birmingham, calling it "fast moving, clever, at times hilarious, and always engaging".

Other notices were more reserved. John Groves of LondonTheatre1 awarded three stars, writing that "the whole cast works very hard to extract every ounce of humour from the writing" but criticising the pacing and lighting. Reviewing the production at The Lowry for British Theatre Guide, the critic called it "a diverting entertainment", while suggesting that it "feel[s] like an admission of defeat" that the show was funniest when it moved away from being a tribute to the board game towards "straightforward silly farce". In a two-star review for The Spy in the Stalls, Phillip Money concluded that "there's much here that could be funny if only it were slicker, shorter and snappier". Reviewing the Brighton run for BroadwayWorld, the critic described the production as "intentionally and unapologetically farcical", with "a barely-there narrative", but judged it "a lot of fun" and "enjoyable enough", likening it to Noises Off rather than Agatha Christie.

== Licensing ==
The North American acting edition, titled Clue: The British Invasion and adapted by Yoni Weiss, is published by Dramatists Play Service and licensed by Concord Theatricals. It is a full-length comedy set in 1960s Britain, written for a cast of three women and nine men. The published cast list allows the company size to be expanded or reduced through doubling: the roles of Patrick Gray, Sergeant Brown and Rick Black may be played by the same actor.
