= Emily Bruni =

British actress

- Born: Emily Bruni; 1975 (age 50–51); Exeter, Devon, England
- Education: Guildhall School of Music and Drama
- Occupation: Actress
- Spouse: Matt Wilkinson
- Children: 1

Emily Bruni (born 5 April 1975 in Exeter, Devon) is an English actress. She played the sniper Shooter in Martin Campbell's action picture Dirty Angels, and starred in the one-woman play Psychodrama.

== Personal life ==
Born to an English mother and Italian father, Bruni was raised in the UK but spent part of her childhood living in Italy. She is bilingual. She lives in London and is married to British playwright and director Matt Wilkinson. They have one son. Bruni is a long-term meditator and yoga practitioner and has taught both practices under the moniker Emily Valente.

== Education ==
Bruni attended St Peter's High School, Exeter, Exeter Sixth Form College, National Youth Theatre and the Guildhall School of Music and Drama.

== Career ==
In theatre, Bruni spent three years at the Royal Shakespeare Company, where her roles included Esmeralda in Camino Real, directed by Steven Pimlott. She starred as Jean Rhys in The Shared Experience production After Mrs Rochester, which opened the New Sydney Theatre. She played Lady India in Ring Round The Moon (Playhouse Theatre), choreographed by Wayne McGregor. In 2013 she played Claire in Yes, Prime Minister (Trafalgar Studios) written and directed by Jonathan Lynn.

In 2015, Bruni appeared in Donkey Heart and the one-woman play Before You Were Born, both by Moses Raine and both directed by Nina Raine at the Trafalgar Studios. In 2016, she starred in the Steven Berkoff double bill Lunch and The Bow of Ulysses (Trafalgar Studios), directed by Nigel Harman. in 2016 Bruni played Goneril in King Lear (Globe) directed by Nancy Meckler.

Bruni played Debbie in Laurence Boswell's production of the Donald Margulies play The Model Apartment at the Bath Ustinov theatre. In 2021, she played Actress in Psychodrama, a one-woman play about an actress under investigation for the murder of an auteur theatre director, while rehearsing a production of Hitchcock's Psycho. Staged in a found space in London, it transferred in 2022 to the Traverse Theatre, Edinburgh. The play was written and directed by Matt Wilkinson and produced by Pádraig Cusack. Bruni was nominated for the 2022 Offie for Best Actress.

On film, Bruni played Tanya in the ITV drama Metropolis by Peter Morgan. She starred alongside Rik Mayall in the sitcom Believe Nothing as Dr. Hannah Awkward (a professor of pedantics). The series was written by Maurice Gran and Laurence Marks. In 2002, she appeared alongside Bill Nighy in the return of Auf Wiedersehen, Pet. In 2004 she played Alice in Passer By by Tony Marchant, directed by David Morrissey.

Bruni portrayed the Empress Catherine the Great in the 2005 television drama Catherine the Great. From 2009 to 2012, she played Gail, the girlfriend of Jeremy's love interest, in Series 6, 7 and 8 of the Channel 4 comedy Peep Show.

She starred in the 2022 film Psychodrama by writer and director Matt Wilkinson and producers Ben Pullen and Pádraig Cusack.
