= Camden School for Girls =

Comprehensive school in London, England (founded 1871)

The Camden School for Girls

Location
- Sandall Road; Camden Town; London, NW5 2DB; England; 51°32′46″N 0°08′05″W

Information
- Type: Voluntary aided
- Motto: Onwards and Upwards
- Established: 1871
- Founder: Frances Mary Buss
- Local authority: Camden
- Department for Education URN: 100054 Tables
- Ofsted: Reports
- Chair of Governors: Janet Pope
- Headmistress: Kateryna Law
- Gender: Girls; coeducational sixth form
- Age: 11 to 18
- Enrolment: 1,034
- Colour: Camden green White
- Publication: Friday News, Sixth Sense
- Affiliations: Camden Consortium
- Website: https://www.camdengirls.camden.sch.uk/

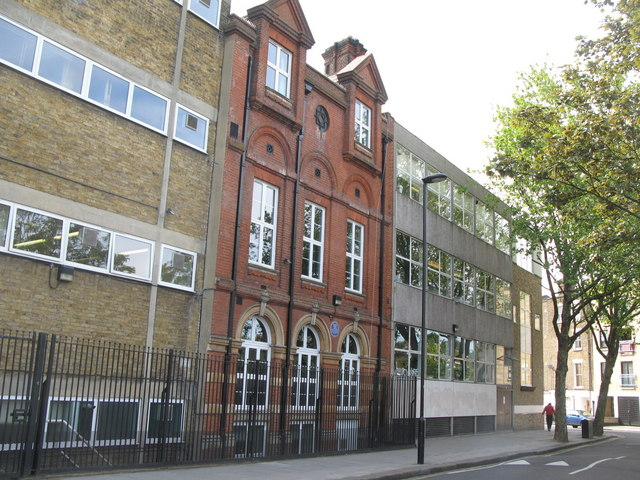

The Camden School for Girls (CSG) is a comprehensive secondary school for girls, with a co-educational sixth form, in the London Borough of Camden in north London. It has about one thousand students of ages eleven to eighteen, and specialist-school status as a Music College. The school has long been associated with the advancement of women's education.

== History ==
Founded in 1871 by the suffragist Frances Mary Buss, who also founded North London Collegiate School, the Camden School for Girls was one of the first girls' schools in England. Although not a fee-paying school by then, girls in the mid-20th century wore a traditional uniform of dark green, with blue and green striped ties. The blazer badge showed a type of ancient sailing ship called a 'buss' to commemorate the founder's surname, with the motto "Onwards and Upwards". In its pre-comprehensive era it was a grant aided grammar school, and girls needed to pass the eleven-plus exam and be interviewed by the headmistress. The grant aided status gave it independence, but it had no endowments, unlike its sister school the North London Collegiate.

=== Evacuation in the Second World War ===
352 girls were evacuated to Uppingham School in September 1939, but it did not work as hoped. So, on Thursday 19 October 1939 the girls were moved to Grantham in Lincolnshire to be educated at Kesteven and Grantham Girls' School, but 450 girls were intended to have been evacuated; Margaret Thatcher, Conservative prime minister from 1979–90, was one of the girls at the Grantham school. The music teacher Grace Williams, a Welsh composer, arrived with the Camden school, and composed pieces while at Grantham. Zoologist Hilda Mabel Canter, of the British Phycological Society, was one of the 352 girls evacuated. Girls from Grantham were taught in the classrooms in the mornings and the Camden girls were taught in the afternoon. The Camden school moved to Stamford High School, Lincolnshire in March 1941, having stayed in Grantham for five terms. The girls stayed in Stamford, Lincolnshire for seven terms, leaving in summer 1943. Stamford people were quite unaccustomed to city dwellers and local people noticed the distinctive green school uniform.

=== Grammar school ===
One of its most formative headmistresses, Doris Burchell, took on the school in the post-war years and developed it in both science and music, overseeing new building on the site. The Sir John Cockcroft science wing was built from funds raised by many means, including a series of Celebrity Concerts held at the school and involving many eminent musicians. The school was damaged in the war but rebuilt in 1957, the architect being John Eastwick-Field OBE. In 1973, the assembly hall roof collapsed following deterioration of its roof beams due to problems with the high-alumina cement concrete used.

=== Comprehensive ===
It became a comprehensive school in 1976, although only year by year. It was not fully comprehensive until 1981.

== Academic performance ==
The 2005 Ofsted report said it was "a very good school with excellent features". The 2007 report stated that "Camden School for Girls rightly deserves the outstanding reputation it has among parents and in the community". The 2022 report stated that the schools overall effectiveness was "good", with a rating of "outstanding" being obtained in terms of behaviour and attitudes, sixth form provision and personal development. In 2025 "19% of A-level grades were at A* and 53% were at A* to A". In 2026, the school "achieved a record set of GCSE results, with an amazing 22% of passes at the highest grade 9 and 56% at grades 9 to 7".

== Notable former students ==
The following people were educated at Camden School for Girls. Some of them only attended the sixth form.

- Sally Beamish (born 1956), composer
- Johnny Borrell (born 1980), musician
- Sarah Brown (born 1963), PR consultant, wife of Gordon Brown
- Sara Annie Burstall (1859–1939)
- Bessie Carter (born 1993), actress
- Julia Cleverdon (born 1950), charity worker
- Charlotte Coleman (1968–2001), actress, Oranges Are Not the Only Fruit, expelled at the age of 16
- Athene Donald (born 1953), Professor of Experimental Physics at the University of Cambridge
- Julia Donaldson (born 1948), author
- Lily Donaldson (born 1987), model
- Nubya Garcia (born 1991), jazz musician
- Georgia Gould (born 1986), Labour Party politician and MP for Queen's Park & Maida Vale
- Eileen Greenwood (1915–2008), artist, printmaker, and art teacher
- Tamsin Greig (born 1967), actress
- Geri Halliwell (born 1972), singer, Spice Girls
- John Hassall (born 1981), musician, The Libertines
- Edith Humphrey (1875–1978), inorganic chemist, thought to be the first British woman to obtain a doctorate in chemistry.
- Daniel Kaluuya (born 1989), Oscar-winning actor and comedian
- Kate Kellaway (born 1957), journalist for The Observer
- Lucy Kellaway (born 1959), writer and journalist for The Financial Times
- Beeban Kidron (born 1961), former film director (including of Oranges Are Not The Only Fruit), and peer in House of Lords
- Sally Laird (1956–2010), editor, writer and translator
- Lilian Lindsay (1871–1960), first woman with a British qualification in dentistry, having graduated from the Royal College of Surgeons of Edinburgh in 1895
- Jodhi May (born 1975), actress
- Fiona Millar (born 1958), journalist and education campaigner
- Deborah Moggach (born 1948), novelist and screenwriter
- Ellie Rowsell (born 1992), lead singer and guitarist in Wolf Alice
- Marianne Stone (1922–2009), actress, notably in Carry On films
- Cleo Sylvestre (1945-2024), actress, first black woman to play a lead at the National Theatre
- E. G. R. Taylor (1871–1966), geographer and historian
- Emma Thompson (born 1959), actress
- Arabella Weir (born 1957), actress, comedian and author

=== Fictional pupils ===
- Prudence Harbinger, fictional character in The Sunday Telegraph, created by Laurence Marks and Maurice Gran

== Notable former teachers ==
- Carol Handley née Taylor - Classics teacher, Headmistress (1971-1985)
- Annie E. Ridley - governor
- Grace Williams – composer
