= Clue: On Stage =

Stage play

- Original language: English
- Written by: Sandy Rustin
- Based on: Clue (1985 film)
- Music by: Michael Holland
- Genre: Farce; Murder mystery; Comedy
- Setting: 1954, Boddy Manor, near Washington, D.C.

Premiere
- Date: May 6, 2017
- Place: Bucks County Playhouse, New Hope, Pennsylvania
- Directed by: Hunter Foster (world premiere)
- clueliveonstage.com

Clue: On Stage is a comedic stage play, characterized as a farce-meets-murder mystery, adapted from the 1985 Paramount Pictures film Clue. The play translates the cult film's well-known characters, iconic setting, and central whodunit premise to a live theatrical format.

Playwright Sandy Rustin adapted Jonathan Lynn's 1985 screenplay for the stage, with Hunter Foster and Eric Price providing "additional material" to the stage version. The action follows six mysterious guests, a butler, and a maid who assemble at Boddy Manor for a dinner party, but find murder and blackmail on the menu.

Clue: On Stage had its world premiere at the Bucks County Playhouse in New Hope, Pennsylvania, in 2017, in a production directed by Hunter Foster. A revised version, directed by Casey Hushion, emerged with a 2020 production at Cleveland Play House. This revised iteration informed subsequent regional productions, including a West Coast premiere at La Mirada Playhouse in 2021 and a 2022 production at the Paper Mill Playhouse, which formed the basis for the ongoing North American tour.

Critics praised the play's successful translation of the film's farce and the game's whodunit suspense into live theater, especially its high-energy physical comedy, rapid-fire dialogue, pacing, and set design.

== Development ==
The board game Cluedo (Clue in North America) was designed by Anthony E. Pratt and his wife Elva Pratt during World War II, inspired by murder mystery parlor games and detective fiction. The game was released in 1949, by Waddingtons in the United Kingdom and Parker Brothers in the United States (now Hasbro).

Writing credits for Clue: On Stage include Jonathan Lynn, whose original screenplay for the 1985 film Clue is the primary source material; Sandy Rustin, who adapted Lynn's screenplay for the stage; and Hunter Foster and Eric Price, who provided "additional material". Lynn, who also directed the film, had a background in theater before his film career. Rustin is a widely produced playwright, and Foster also directed the world premiere.

Initial reports around the premiere sometimes described the work as "adapted and directed by Hunter Foster, with additional material by Eric Price". However, the 2018 published version by Playscripts, Inc. and most subsequent credits establish Rustin as the principal adapter.

Sandy Rustin aimed to preserve elements cherished by fans of the film, such as the famous multiple endings. She emphasizes strong story and characters, and views the play as "healing through laughter".

== Production ==
Clue: On Stage is distinct from 1997's Off-Broadway Clue The Musical, which interacts with the audience to select cards to determine the murderer, weapon, and room, enabling 216 possible endings. In contrast, Clue: On Stage uses theatrically replayed scenarios for its multiple endings.

The world premiere was at the Bucks County Playhouse in New Hope, Pennsylvania. Previews began on May 2, 2017, and it officially ran May 6–20. It was directed by Hunter Foster and based on the screenplay by Jonathan Lynn. At premiere, Hunter Foster and Eric Price were prominently credited with the stage adaptation and additional material. The creative team included Anna Louizos as scenic designer, Ryan O'Gara as lighting designer, Nicole V. Moody as costume designer, and Bart Fasbender as sound designer. Producers were The Araca Group, Work Light Productions, Michael Barra Productions (later Lively McCabe Entertainment), and Aged in Wood Productions, by special arrangement with Bucks County Playhouse. The principal cast featured Carson Elrod as Wadsworth, Claire Simba as Yvette, Lindsay Nicole Chambers as Miss Scarlet, Sally Struthers as Mrs. Peacock, Erin Dilly as Mrs. White, Kevin Carolan as Colonel Mustard, Clifton Duncan as Professor Plum, and Brian J. Carter as Mr. Green, with Cassandra Dupler and William Youmans in multiple roles. The premiere was generally well-received, praised for its fast pace, humor, ensemble work, and set design, and a national tour was announced shortly thereafter.

In 2020, several separate regional productions launched across the US. One was a "revised version" of the play, directed by Casey Hushion, at Cleveland Play House from January 25 to February 16, 2020. There, the cast included Mariah Burks, John Treacy Egan, Mark Price, and Elisabeth Yancey, who later joined the tour. The West Coast premiere followed at La Mirada Playhouse between September and October 2021. For this staging, scenery and props were provided by Clue On Stage, LLC, with costumes from Cleveland Play House and Clue On Stage, LLC. Subsequently, a production at the Paper Mill Playhouse from January 26 to February 20, 2022, directed by Casey Hushion, directly formed the basis for the North American tour. The creative team for this Paper Mill Playhouse production largely continued to the touring production.

The North American Equity tour began February 2024 in Minneapolis, Minnesota, continuing through June 2025 in Toronto, Ontario. Often marketed as simply Clue, and based on the Paper Mill Playhouse production, the tour received positive reviews for its comedic energy, performances, and staging. A non-Equity production tour began in October 2025, with stops scheduled into March 2027.

== Plot ==
The setting is in 1954 at Boddy Manor near Washington, D.C., on a "dark and stormy night". Six guests arrive under aliases: Colonel Mustard, Mrs. White, Mr. Green, Mrs. Peacock, Professor Plum, and Miss Scarlet. They are greeted by Wadsworth the butler and Yvette the maid. It is revealed they are all being blackmailed by their host, Mr. Boddy, who is soon murdered. A chaotic race ensues to find the killer, weapon, and location, as more bodies (the Cook, a Motorist, a Cop, a Singing Telegram Girl) pile up. The play features multiple endings, similar to the film.

== Characters ==
The characters are drawn from the board game and film. These include Wadsworth, an uptight British butler and narrator; Yvette, a flirtatious French maid; Miss Scarlet, a dry, sardonic brothel-keeping madam (whose profession is changed in the High School Edition); Mrs. Peacock, a batty, neurotic wife of a senator; Mrs. White, a pale, morbid, and tragic figure; Colonel Mustard, a pompous and dense military man; Professor Plum, an academic lothario; and Mr. Green, a timid, clumsy, and anxious rule-follower. Other characters include the blackmailer host Mr. Boddy, the threatening Cook, the stranded Motorist, a "regular Joe" Cop, and a perky, tap-dancing Singing Telegram Girl. Ensemble roles include "Auxiliary" characters and FBI Agents.

== Theatrical elements ==
Clue: On Stage is a murder-mystery farce combining suspense with slapstick, puns, and physical comedy. Its pacing is fast and frenetic.

Boddy Manor's multiple rooms (such as the Study, Library, and Kitchen) are represented through innovative staging, often using rolling set pieces, revolving stage, moving walls, and hidden passageways. The set is crucial for the farcical action.

Like the film, the play features multiple endings. Original music by Michael Holland underscores the action and enhances suspense. Sound effects, including thunder and gunshots, build atmosphere and provide comedic punctuation.

== High school edition ==
Clue (High School Edition) was adapted by Sandy Rustin, and has been popular in educational settings. The plot and length are largely similar, and modifications include age-appropriate language, altered "risqué themes" (for example, Miss Scarlet's profession as madam is mysteriously obscured by a blackmailer), and a reduced cost of production package. It is consistently one of the most-produced US high school plays, with its popularity attributed to familiarity with the source material, its ensemble nature, and the opportunities it provides for comedic acting.

== Reception ==
Clue: On Stage has generally received positive reviews, praising its energetic physical comedy, faithfulness to the source material, ensemble performances, rapid-fire dialogue, and set design. Some critics note that certain jokes may not land effectively, or that familiarity with the film enhances enjoyment of the play.

Laura DeMarco of The Plain Dealer called the early regional premiere at Cleveland Play House in early 2020 "a witty, lighthearted, retro romp filled with colorful characters in a creepy old manor house — during a terrible storm, of course". At the Paper Mill Playhouse in February 2022, The New York Times called it "a very fun, very silly 1950s-set whodunit that strikes some contemporary parallels on the way to its grand reveal".

In 2024, Clue: On Stage began a North American tour in the US and Canada. The Stages of MN found the February production at the Orpheum Theatre in Minneapolis to be "suspiciously familiar but devilishly fun". In March, Kirby Adams of the Louisville Courier Journal noted that the PNC Broadway engagement had "its own unique soundtrack — the constant audience laughter that filled the Kentucky Center's Whitney Hall on opening night". In March, at the Fox Cities Performing Arts Center, Karita Reed of The Post-Crescent wrote that "The play is filled with rapid banter, slapstick comedy and some enthralling special effects that elicit 'oohs' and 'aahs' from the audience".

Reviewing its August engagement at the Ahmanson Theatre in Los Angeles, Charles McNulty of the Los Angeles Times described it as having a "giddy sense of play [where the players] attack their roles with the breathless exuberance of clowns who know they're onto a good thing" and praised the "infectious quality to the knockabout antics". Maureen Lee Lenker for Entertainment Weekly called the Ahmanson show "funny and frothy and light, the kind of breezy night at the theater that most audiences would kill for right now". Steven Stanley of Stage Scene LA described the Ahmanson run as "A delish dose of nonstop whodunit hilarity", adding that "One-liners fly fast and furious with pitch-perfect rapid-fire comedic timing and bursts of side-splitting slapstick".

Separately in July, a regional production at the 5th Avenue Theatre in Seattle was reviewed by Seattle's Child. It was called a "goofy" comedy particularly appealing to families, where familiarity with the board game might enhance the experience. It ran for 90 minutes without an intermission.

== Licensing ==
The play is licensed primarily through Broadway Licensing. Playscripts, Inc. also lists the High School Edition but directs inquiries to Broadway Licensing. Dramatists Play Service handles some professional licensing applications in conjunction with Broadway Licensing. Production materials available include script editions, logo packs, scenic projections, and audio packages containing sound effects and underscoring tracks.

== Other Clue stage adaptations ==
In 2024, Cluedo 2 – The Next Chapter, by Laurence Marks and Maurice Gran, premiered in the United Kingdom. Like Clue: On Stage, it is based on the 1985 Paramount Pictures film and the Hasbro board game. Its North American edition is adapted by Yoni Weiss and licensed under the title Clue: The British Invasion.
