= Unfinished Business (TV series) =

British TV sitcom (BBC One, 1998–99)

- Created by: Maurice Gran; Laurence Marks
- Directed by: Baz Taylor
- Starring: Harriet Walter; Henry Goodman; Jaye Griffiths; Brigitte Kahn; Elisabeth Dermot Walsh; Art Malik; William Mannering; Don Gallagher; Catherine Chevalier; Richard Cordery; Jason O'Mara; Jessica Oyelowo
- Composer: Alan Hawkshaw
- Country of origin: United Kingdom
- Original language: English
- No. of series: 2
- No. of episodes: 12

Production
- Executive producer: Claire Hinson
- Producers: Sioned Wiliam; Julian Meers; Guy Slater
- Running time: 30 minutes
- Production company: Alomo Productions

Original release
- Network: BBC One
- Release: 24 January 1998 – 14 February 1999

Unfinished Business is a British sitcom written by Laurence Marks and Maurice Gran which ran for two series between 24 January 1998 and 14 February 1999 on BBC One. It stars Harriet Walter as Amy, Henry Goodman as Spike and Jaye Griffiths as Tania.

== Premise ==
Ten years ago, Spike (Goodman) abandoned his wife Amy (Walter), and their children, son Toby (Mannering) and daughter Rachel (Walsh), and moved to Paris with another woman. A year ago, Amy was abandoned again, when her lover, Tam (Malik), left her for his own "other woman". To make things so much worse, his "other woman" is Amy's daughter Rachel.

Amy now finds her herself alone and miserable all over again, and even more dependent upon her friend, Tania (Griffiths), and her therapist, Ruth (Kahn).

Life gets more complicated when, out of the blue, she (literally) bumps into Spike, now single, and back in England. Can they rekindle their relationship, or are old hurts too great?

== Episodes ==
=== Series overview ===
Series	Episodes	Originally released	
Series	Episodes	First released	Last released
1	6	24 January 1998	28 February 1998
2	6	10 January 1999	14 February 1999

=== Series 1 (1998) ===
No.	Title	Original release date
1	"Episode 1"	24 January 1998
2	"Episode 2"	31 January 1998
3	"Episode 3"	7 February 1998
4	"Episode 4"	14 February 1998
5	"Episode 5"	21 February 1998
6	"Episode 6"	28 February 1998

=== Series 2 (1999) ===
No.	Title	Original release date
7	"Episode 1"	10 January 1999
8	"Episode 2"	17 January 1999
9	"Episode 3"	24 January 1999
10	"Episode 4"	31 January 1999
11	"Episode 5"	7 February 1999
12	"Episode 6"	14 February 1999
