= Mark Farmer (actor) =

British actor (1962–2016)

Mark Farmer (22 May 1962 – 26 April 2016) was an English actor and musician. He is perhaps best remembered for his childhood role of Gary Hargreaves in series 2 to 4 of the children's television programme Grange Hill, in which he starred from 1979 to 1981.

Farmer had a range of earlier childhood roles, and also went on to appear as a teenager and young adult in various programmes, notably the lead role in the 1983 BBC drama Johnny Jarvis and the role of Justin James from 1984 to 1989 in the comedy-drama series Minder.

From 1985 to 1987, Farmer starred alongside Matthew Kelly in Relative Strangers, a Channel 4 sitcom. The sitcom was a spin-off from an ITV comedy, Holding the Fort (1980–82). He also appeared in a 1987 television drama film, Mister Corbett's Ghost, starring Paul Scofield and John Huston.

After Farmer's career in film and television, he formed a band, Littlehouse, with school classmate Billy Hardwicke. He played acoustic guitar; Hardwicke played electric guitar, and both sang. Fellow friends Patrick Watson and Steve Claridge played bass and drums, respectively. They recorded an EP; the title track was "Close My Eyes". Hardwicke later featured that track on his solo album The Goodbye Look. Littlehouse gigged the London circuit between 1998 and 2000, after which they split up. Farmer also played bass guitar with Bad Manners, a ska band.

== Death ==
Farmer died on 26 April 2016, aged 53, after a brief battle with cancer.
