= Believe Nothing =

British comedy television series (2002)

- Created by: Maurice Gran; Laurence Marks
- Directed by: John Stroud
- Starring: Rik Mayall; Michael Maloney; Emily Bruni
- Country of origin: United Kingdom
- Original language: English
- No. of episodes: 6

Production
- Running time: 30 minutes

Original release
- Network: ITV
- Release: 14 July – 18 August 2002

Believe Nothing is a British sitcom starring Rik Mayall as Quadruple Professor Adonis Cnut, the cleverest man in Britain, and Oxford's leading moral philosopher. He is paid huge amounts of money for his views, consulted by the government, but he is bored and wants adventure, so he joins the shadowy organization The Council which controls everything going on in the world. Starring alongside Mayall is Michael Maloney as Brian Albumen, Cnut's faithful servant, and Emily Bruni as Hannah Awkward who becomes professor of pedantics.

The series was written by Maurice Gran and Laurence Marks. Although much hyped by ITV, who were hoping to repeat the success of Gran and Marks' previous project with Mayall, The New Statesman, the series did not achieve high viewing figures, and was dropped after one series.

== Main cast ==
Character	Actor
Quadruple Professor Adonis Cnut	Rik Mayall
Brian Albumen	Michael Maloney
Hannah Awkward	Emily Bruni

== Episodes, summaries and additional cast ==
1. Get Rich Quick
2. Prepare to Meteor Maker
3. Might as Well Face It, You're Addicted to Fudge
4. Double First
5. The Unhappy Eater
6. Just a Minute

In Get Rich Quick, Adonis Cnut meets the attractive Hannah Awkward, who is trying to get a professorship. However, Adonis had already voted against her before he had met her, and since he cannot change his vote, Dr. Awkward will not become professor. The only way is for her to marry Adonis, since one is not allowed to vote against one's own wife. Then Albumen wins 50 million pounds on a TV show, with Adonis giving him the answers through a headset, which is part of a scheme to make people think that genetically modified food makes you very smart. Albumen is made honorary member of the university senate, and gives Dr. Awkward his vote, so she does not have to marry Adonis. Adonis, however, is not very pleased about this.

Character	Actor
Chairman	Don Warrington
Lance Boyle	Barry Cryer
Le Fanu	Pip Torrens
Nebbish	Kerry Shale
Boutros Boutros Ghali	Vic Tablian
Dave Short	Tim Vine
Newscaster	Jon Glover
Doris	Maureen Sweeney

In Prepare to Meteor Maker, Sir Richard Chutney announces to the secret council that planet earth will soon collide with a meteor. All the members of the council decide to pretend they are having a charity high-altitude balloon race, while they are actually escaping armageddon. Meanwhile, Albumen is about to be arrested, because The Sun is threatening to release an article about his treason during the Falklands War. Adonis Cnut takes Hannah and Albumen with him in his balloon, looking forward to having to repopulate the world together with Hannah. When he tries to shoot an albatross, Adonis actually hits Richard Chutney's balloon, and Chutney seems to land on their balcony. The man then turns out to be called Graeme, and Chutney is apparently still on the ground, having lied about the meteor, and is now buying all the world's major companies (including Microsoft) for very reasonable prices. Luckily, while Chutney is busy becoming the owner of the planet, Adonis "drops in unannounced" and manages to depress Chutney so much (by telling him there are no challenges left for him in life) that it drives him to jump out of the window. Adonis buys The Sun and prevents Albumen's arrest.

Character	Actor
Chairman	Don Warrington
Sir Richard Chutney	Paul Shearer
Major	Richard Braine
Graeme	James Mansfield

In Might as Well Face It, You're Addicted to Fudge, Dr. Awkward is rapidly gaining weight due to her addiction to Albumen's home-made fudge. Unfortunately, Albumen has been illegally selling his confectionery on the Magdalen Bridge (in British imperial units), and all the fudge has been confiscated by the police as evidence. Albumen is very defensive of the old imperial measures and calls himself a "metric martyr". Meanwhile, the secret council is in need of an offshore island to control, and Cuba seems to be a good option. Adonis disguises himself as Cuban exile Señor Guacamole and visits the somewhat dimwitted US president George W. Shrub, in order to make him believe he has to invade Cuba. He succeeds, and visits UK prime minister Tony Caring while he is at it, also persuading him he has to declare war on Cuba, but also to leave the European Union and reinstate the old British imperial measures. Meanwhile, Hannah has broken into the police station and eaten the 17 kilos worth of fudge they had confiscated as evidence. Both she and Albumen are arrested by Constable Haywain. However, the council has found out that Cuba is no longer an option, because it will be hit by a tidal wave. Adonis returns to America and persuades president Shrub ("Call me Dubya!") by means of a special cigar to reconsider declaring war. He explains to the council that, now that Britain has left the European Union, it will be available as their own exploitable offshore island. Albumen receives a pardon from the prime minister in a foolscap envelope, on quarto parchment, handwritten with ink made from soot and cold tea.

Character	Actor
President George W. Shrub	Rory Bremner
Chairman	Don Warrington
Prime Minister Tony Caring	Mark Perry
Constable Haywain	Rebecca Sarker

In Double First, Adonis Cnut is suspected of murdering Burger King Professor Sheridan Brinsley in a pub toilet after having appeared on a talk show with him. Adonis denies he has killed Brinsley, but is clearly being secretive about something. One afternoon, when he is normally lecturing, Dr. Awkward accidentally meets Adonis in his office and he starts kissing her. However, when Hannah starts "scrabbling at his trousers like a deranged dormouse", Adonis stops her and tells her he's impotent. When she tells Albumen about this, he knows something must be wrong, and when they ask Adonis whether he would like to go to a sex therapist, he reveals what has really been going on. As it turns out, Adonis has been mapping human DNA in his secret laboratory for the last few years, and has already started cloning people as well, namely Albumen (a spare one, in case something happens to the original) and himself. Adonis's clone has evidently murdered Sheridan Brinsley, but when the clone comes over to the apartment, no one can tell who is the real Adonis. The real Adonis then tells the police inspector about a microdot he put between the buttocks of his clone in order to tell them apart. This turns out to be a bluff, but it becomes clear that the clone has no genitals (as Adonis puts it: "teflon groin") which is convincing enough. The clone is arrested and Adonis goes free.

Character	Actor
Detective Inspector Aldiss	Kenneth Cranham
Professor Sheridan Brinsley	Mike McShane
Sergeant Carroll	Craig Heaney
Doris	Maureen Sweeney
Melvyn Bragg	Melvyn Bragg

In The Unhappy Eater, the now Nobel Prize winner Adonis Cnut is sent on a mission to find the formula to an antidepressant. The formula already exists, but has been hidden somewhere. The person who hid it is Edmund Bilyas, a professor who shares quite a few characteristics with Hannibal Lecter, who is now in prison because he ate 11 of his students. Adonis and Albumen visit him in prison to offer him things (such as "edible cellmates") in exchange for the whereabouts of the formula. Bilyas does not accept their offers, but lets Adonis work the problem out by himself. Albumen suggests the location will have something to do with cannibalism, after which dr. Awkward suddenly remembers an exhibition she went to around the time Bilyas was arrested, about a cannibal Aztec king called Quecalaxlotlotl. They find out that the exhibition is currently in the Extremely Islamic Republic of Belugastan. They go to Belugastan and trick one of the museum guards into turning the alarm system off. Adonis finds the formula inside a skull and when they come home, he tests the drug on Albumen and on Hannah, who is immediately off to Hollywood (because she is suddenly so happy about her looks) to star together with Anthony Hopkins in "Muteness of the Goats III: The Revenge of Billy". Adonis uses the antidepressant on the prime minister, who would not let him have a statue of himself made. Due to the drug, the prime minister says a few rather stupid things during a TV interview and is fired. The new prime minister thanks him by means of giving him a huge statue of himself with golden angel wings ("visible from space") in front of Buckingham Palace.

Character	Actor
Professor Edmund Bilyas	Clive Merrison
Prime Minister Tony Caring	Mark Perry
David Killjoy	David Fleeshman
King of Norway	Adam Astill
Captain	Mido Hamada

In Just a Minute, Adonis Cnut has just finished making the pilot for his new TV series called A Long History of Time, "not to be confused with Stephen Hawking's superficial treatment of the same subject". Unfortunately, the people at the BBC do not think the man in the street will appreciate his programme, so it will be aired at 3 a.m. on "BBC Digital Choice Gold Two". Adonis tells Albumen, who is apparently not feeling too well, to tape the programme. However, when Adonis watches the tape the next day, the last minute before the end has been cut off and instead there is a "film about Watergate" that was already on the tape. He confronts Albumen with the missing minute of his programme and accuses him of deliberately setting the VCR so that it would stop a minute before the end. Albumen replies that, funnily enough, "all VCRs do that". Hannah arrives and she tells Adonis to phone a doctor, because Albumen is literally green in the face and obviously ill. Doctor Clarence Newell-Post (a former lover of Vincent Awkward, Hannah's father) arranges a bed for Albumen at the hospital. Meanwhile, the secret council are struggling with the economic problems surrounding the phenomenon of global warming. Albumen is released from hospital and is diagnosed with radiation sickness. Adonis lets him watch his tape to make him feel better, and it turns out that the Watergate film on the tape is actual footage from the White House. Albumen explains that his father worked there as a janitor during Watergate, and that he stole the VCR and the tape in it from the White House. On the tape, there is evidence that Richard Nixon and Henry Kissinger came up with a plan to manipulate all new digital watches from China to make every hour 30 seconds longer. Like this, they could get rid of the "incriminating 18 minutes" of the Watergate scandal. Adonis figures out that this is the key to global warming: "because it is 30 years since Watergate, the calendar is three months adrift, so the fact that it feels like April in January, is because it actually is April in January". This means there is no global warming and that everyone can just "carry on polluting". Kissinger, who is now in the secret council, warns Adonis about the VCR: it was a gift from the Chinese, who had stuffed it with plutonium to try to kill the president. Adonis runs over to his apartment, where Albumen and Hannah are now both green and ill, and throws the VCR out of the window, after which it explodes and Believe Nothing ends with Adonis's words "Oh, bugger".

Character	Actor
Chairman	Don Warrington
Henry Kissinger	David de Keyser
Doctor Clarence Newell-Post	Patrick Ryecart
President Richard Nixon	Geoffrey McGivern
Colonel	Barrie Gosney
Laura	Jane Robbins

== DVD release ==
The complete series has been released in both the UK (from Fremantle Home Entertainment) and Australia (through Shock DVD) as a region free DVD. The DVD features extras including one-on-one interviews with the series writer and regular cast and bloopers. Although the series was produced in 16:9 widescreen the DVD contains a 4:3 crop of all the episodes.
