= List of The New Statesman episodes =

The New Statesman is a British sitcom made in the late 1980s and early 1990s satirising the United Kingdom's Conservative Party Government of the period. It was written by Laurence Marks and Maurice Gran at the request of, and as a starring vehicle for, its principal actor Rik Mayall.

== Episodes ==
=== Series 1 (1987) ===
No. overall	No. in series	Title	Directed by	Written by	Original release date
1	1	"Happiness is a Warm Gun"	Geoffrey Sax	Laurence Marks and Maurice Gran	13 September 1987
Alan B'Stard is elected as the Conservative MP for the constituency of Haltemprice in Yorkshire after having the brake lines cut on the cars of his Labour and SDP opponents. However, Chief Constable Sir Malachi Jellicoe, has uncovered evidence proving Alan's complicity, and blackmails Alan to do "God's will" and allow police officers to carry guns. After passing the new law and recovering the evidence of his crime Alan realises Sir Malachi is mentally disturbed and believes "The Almighty" speaks to him. After convincing Sir Malachi an anti-gun Bishop is the Antichrist, Alan has Sir Malachi arrested for trying to kill the Bishop, promoting his grateful and less troublesome Deputy chief constable to replace him.
2	2	"Passport to Freedom"	Geoffrey Sax	Laurence Marks and Maurice Gran	20 September 1987
When Alan's wife, Sarah, announces that she has inherited 200,000 shares of Ocelot Motors and now plans to divorce him, Alan is panic-stricken as he only became an MP with support from Sarah's father, a Conservative Party Chairman, and divorce would cost him his seat in Parliament. Seeking to see Ocelot bankrupted, he forges a letter from Margaret Thatcher to the chairman of Ocelot authorising them to de-unionise their workforce and begin cutting wages. After provoking Labour MP Bob Crippen, himself a member of a car manufacturer's union, Alan ensures Ocelot's workforce goes on strike lowering the value of Ocelot shares. With Sarah unable to divorce him, Alan retains his position as MP.
3	3	"Sex is Wrong"	Geoffrey Sax	Laurence Marks and Maurice Gran	27 September 1987
Alan meets with Lady Virginia Imry, an elderly, prudish aristocrat who has written an educational pamphlet entitled "Sex is Wrong" and who mistakes Alan for Sir Stephen Baxter. Seeing an opportunity and learning she will be forced to skip the Tory party conference, he convinces her that he can get the pamphlet published and uses her money to do it. He then arranges to have it printed with full-colour photographs of the sex acts in question to boost sales at the conference. After Lady Virginia attends the conference anyway, Alan improvises a speech (originally intended to introduce his local party's motion regarding privatisation) that both convinces Lady Virginia he is an upright moral crusader and ensures every copy of the book is bought by the lustful Tory members. Later, Alan realises his speech caused the prudish Lady Virginia to experience a sudden and intense lust for him, which he is forced to go along with or risk having to return her money.
4	4	"Waste Not, Want Not"	Geoffrey Sax	Laurence Marks and Maurice Gran	4 October 1987
Norman, Alan's transsexual accountant, tells him that the depot in Hull where he illegally stored nuclear waste is scheduled for demolition. Needing somewhere to move the waste, Alan learns of a disused coal mine owned by Roland (Alan's father-in-law). Norman refuses to help Alan dump the waste as the mine is under a council estate primary school, so Alan instead pressures Sidney Bliss, pub landlord and former hangman, to help instead. It transpires Roland had closed the mine to store mustard gas he planned to use against the communists in his workforce and offers to let Alan store the waste alongside his gas, but will charge him a fortune for the privilege.
5	5	"Friends of St. James"	Geoffrey Sax	Laurence Marks and Maurice Gran	11 October 1987
Alan encounters his former school classmate Lance Okum-Martin, who tells him that he is now President for Life of the tropical island Republic of St. James. Learning the island is money poor because it does not have its own bank, Alan plans to open the offshore bank himself. Conning several Members of Parliament into investing into his bank for tax evasion purposes, Alan plans to steal their money for himself. During the flight to St. James with the money, Alan learns that Lance is really just the grandson of the actual President for Life and a known conman planning to steal Alan's ill-gotten gains. Alan instead forces Piers to join him in posing as a pair of masked skyjackers. With the skyjackers having supposedly parachuted away with the money, Alan is hailed a hero for saving the plane and walks away with the money.
6	6	"Three Line Whipping"	Geoffrey Sax	Laurence Marks and Maurice Gran	18 October 1987
Having spent the night at a brothel, Alan is late to a live TV interview and is humiliated when he does not know the result of the previous night's by-election. Alan takes out his anger on an annoying cabbie, seemingly killing him. Alan stows the body in the cab and intends to drive it into the countryside and set it on fire. On the journey, Alan unintentionally picks up Prime Minister Margaret Thatcher and her Chief Whip who wants Alan disciplined after his TV interview and ignoring a three-line whip. In his role as cabbie, Alan suggests the public actually have a lot of respect for him. After dropping them off, he discovers the cabbie is not dead, merely unconscious. He convinces police the cabbie kidnapped him, and the cabbie is arrested. The Chief Whip informs Alan that the Prime Minister decided not to sack him after talking with a common cabbie, with Alan smugly hinting to the furious Chief Whip he was the cabbie in question.
7	7	"Baa Baa Black Sheep"	Geoffrey Sax	Laurence Marks and Maurice Gran	25 October 1987
Roland informs Alan that as he has done nothing to benefit Haltemprice he is to be deselected at the next Tory party meeting. Alan takes the advice of Norman (now called Norma), to cozy up to the owner of an American fast food chain, Lamb Burger Guzzler, which will be locating its factory in either Haltemprice or Wales since both contain a lot of sheep farms. Alan manages to ensure that Wales is taken out of consideration by incriminating the Secretary of State for Wales, whom he unwittingly kills. Alan takes a meeting with Mr. Guzzler, taking Norma to pose as his wife. At the meeting, the Guzzlers invite Alan and Norma to join them in a swingers party, Alan is naturally forced to refuse. This turns out to be the right move, as Mr. Guzzler reveals they are actually devoutly religious and were just testing Alan's moral fortitude and places his factory in Haltemprice. Having benefitted Haltemprice's farmers and creating thousands of factory jobs, Alan avoids deselection.

=== Special ===
Comic Relief (BBC1 - 5 February 1988) – As a part of the first biennial Red Nose Day telethon held by the Comic Relief charity, a special edition of The New Statesman entitled "Alan B'Stard Closes Down the BBC" was broadcast. Alan arrives for a meeting with Margaret Thatcher. Thatcher's secretary Celia Imrie tells him she cannot see him because she's busy in a meeting with Cecil Parkinson "and a whip," making Rik Mayall break character briefly and doing a snippet of Rick before saying, "But of course, that was a different series."

Alan persuades Thatcher to shut down the BBC, at which point the episode fades to black. An announcer announces the end of the BBC, following which a series of (impersonated) BBC stars are heard departing the BBC.

In the post-shutdown darkness Alan makes a pass at Thatcher, who asks "You just wanted to get a snog out of me, is that right, Bastard?". Alan replies "Yes, Prime Minister", dropping his trousers to reveal Union Jack boxer shorts, and the episode concludes with the closing titles in the style of, and with the theme tune of, Yes, Prime Minister.

=== Series 2 (1989) ===
No. overall	No. in series	Title	Directed by	Written by	Original release date
8	1	"Fatal Extraction"	Geoffrey Sax	Laurence Marks and Maurice Gran	15 January 1989
Alan discovers £1 billion of oil beneath Hackney Marshes and persuades Georgina Pritt, the socialist leader of Hackney Council who he had earlier antagonised on the political discussion show Controversy and made a pass at on the pretense of giving her a lift, to sell by claiming he will develop the land and create hundreds of jobs. However, her fellow anti-profit Council members move to expel her from the party after discovering her meeting with Alan. Deciding to have the Tories take over Hackney, Alan introduces a private members' bill to the restrict the franchise to taxpayers earning more than £200,000 per annum, thus disenfranchising 90% of Britain's population. The Chief Whip declares a state of emergency as Alan's law has resulted in the worst conflict between Parliament and the Royal family since the English Civil War. After the naïvely honest Piers lets slip to Georgina the oil's existence, she leased the land to herself in her last act as council leader and promptly retires as an oil millionairess. After punishing Piers, Alan agrees to give the people back their voting rights, but in the process discovers the Chief Whip is a closeted homosexual and takes great delight in blackmailing him.
9	2	"Live from Westminster"	Geoffrey Sax	Laurence Marks and Maurice Gran	22 January 1989
After the introduction of television cameras to the House of Commons, Alan becomes a television celebrity, selling product tie-ins and appearing on game shows. Alan's wife Sarah sells her life story to a national tabloid, exposing the dark secrets of Alan and most of the Conservative party members. He implores Thatcher to stop the publication, but she reveals she ordered Sarah to write the story to cut him down to size after he unintentionally upstaged her by introducing the cameras. Alan convinces Piers the tabloid is publishing an unflattering story about Thatcher, and that Thatcher thinks Piers wrote it, manipulating Piers into blowing up the warehouse where all the copies of the tabloid are stored. Alan takes advantage to gain more popularity in the Commons by passing fire prevention laws.
10	3	"The Wapping Conspiracy"	Geoffrey Sax	Laurence Marks and Maurice Gran	29 January 1989
Looking to recruit teenage girls to have sex with, Alan becomes the patron of the "Young Ladies' Recreational Association". However, a reporter for The Times publishes photographs of him engaged in group sex with several of the girls. Alan decides to sue The Times for libel, convincing Sarah to play the role of loving wife for a share of the profits. During the trial, in which both Alan and Sarah's sordid sexual practices are revealed, the reporter admits that he doctored the photos to implicate Alan, and Alan is awarded £500,000 in damages. As Alan celebrates with Piers and Sarah, the reporter arrives and explains that he and Sarah's father set the whole thing up to scam the paper. Alan, who just so happened to have a tape recorder in his pocket, cheats the reporter out of his share of the money and uses the tape as evidence to sue the reporter for additional libel.
11	4	"The Haltemprice Bunker"	Geoffrey Sax	Laurence Marks and Maurice Gran	5 February 1989
The British public are outraged that Nazis are hiding in Britain under false identities. Lonsdale, a financial journalist, offers to let Alan profit from Augusto Pinochet's new slavery programme for an investment of £500,000. Alan decides to expose Helmut Drucker, an ex-Nazi whom Alan has been blackmailing for years, in order to capitalise politically on the fame of catching a Nazi. Drucker bribes Alan with £500,000 in Nazi gold, allowing Alan to buy into Lonsdale's scheme. Alan meets Drucker at a railway station to exchange the gold for a train ticket to a new life somewhere else, only to discover that Piers Fletcher-Dervish, having decided to stand up to Alan's bullying, has tipped off the media. Drucker, believing that he was betrayed and that he is a more principled man than the avaricious Alan, declares his intention to expose Alan's blackmailing to the press. Panicking, Alan pretends to have lured Drucker to the station to expose him and in the ensuing struggle pushes Drucker in front of a train. Alan is furious when Margaret Thatcher covers up Drucker's murder to avoid embarrassing the Conservative Party, denying Alan the credit for exposing a Nazi.
12	5	"California Here I Come"	Geoffrey Sax	Laurence Marks and Maurice Gran	12 February 1989
Alan and Piers fly to Hollywood so Alan can pitch the idea of a soap opera about the Royal Family. His pitch is rejected so he lashes out by tricking Piers into taking a large amount of cocaine, making Piers rabidly royalist and causing him to fight an Australian TV director. Alan is propositioned for bondage sex by Donna Nightingale, a soap opera star. While fetching her Quaaludes, which are in her car, Alan accidentally locks himself out of the building in his underwear and swallows the Quaaludes to hide them from police. Alan eventually awakes in the Malibu jail to find Piers arrested for possession of cocaine. Having been denied bail, Alan tricks the police into sounding anti-royalist, causing Piers to attack and they escape during the confusion. Alan returns to Donna's flat, where she has been tied to her bed all night, and retrieves his clothing, money and plane ticket home, then leaves Donna still tied to the bed.
13	6	"May the Best Man Win"	Geoffrey Sax	Laurence Marks and Maurice Gran	19 February 1989
Piers reminds Alan he will marry his fiancée, Clarissa, and that Alan agreed to be his best man, for a fee. Alan injures Clarissa's mother by scaring her horse with his car and insults her father who considers Alan a rude, uncultured spiv. Meeting Clarissa, Alan lusts over her and easily seduces her as she is very open minded about sex and plans on being faithful to Piers once married anyway. After their very short sex session, she insults his skills as a lover and declares that, once married, she will see to it Piers no longer acts as Alan's lackey. Determined to keep Piers under his control, Alan tries to kill Clarissa, but Clarissa foils him due to being an Olympic judo champion. All of Alan's following murder attempts fail due to bad luck, with his attempt to disrupt the ceremony by hiring an actress to play Piers' mistress failing after Clarissa recognises the actress, and the actress in turn breaking character in reaction to Clarissa's unflattering criticism. Clarissa successfully marries Piers, so Alan ruins the wedding reception by catering it using salmonella- and botulism-riddled food disposed from the House of Commons.
14	7	"Piers of the Realm"	Geoffrey Sax	Laurence Marks and Maurice Gran	26 February 1989
Alan is in Yorkshire to make money on a fixed horse race. He informs Sarah he has been secretly videotaping her infidelities and selling them as pornography in Germany, but now plans to use them as evidence to divorce her. Returning to London, he is shocked to discover Piers has been promoted to junior minister under Sir Greville MacDonald, Secretary of State for the Environment, and is no longer afraid of him. After destroying Piers' favourite teddy bear and going through Piers' desk, he discovers all the buildings Piers declared worthy of historic preservation are actually strip clubs and brothels owned by Sir Greville, allowing him to renovate them with taxpayers money. Alan is contacted by his German contact who wants more videos of Sarah, so Alan cancels the divorce and gives her money to hire as many male household servants as she wants. However, Sarah soon learns of Alan's ulterior motive from a tabloid journalist. Alan blackmails Sir Greville into letting him renovate several buildings he owns. Having angered Sarah, Piers, and Greville simultaneously, Alan is shot by an unseen gunman.
15	Special	"Who Shot Alan B'Stard?"	Geoffrey Sax	Laurence Marks and Maurice Gran	14 January 1990
With Alan believed dead, Parliament debates reinstating hanging and Alan himself strides into the room and casts the crucial last vote. Alan claims he was healed by a spiritual healer and sets up a fake charity "Central Amazon Spiritual Healers" in his name then bribes Sir Greville for the contract to construct the new gallows. Sidney Bliss manages to get his former job as official hangman back, but only because he threatens to tell the newspapers he carried out the illegal hanging of Lord Lucan in 1974. Sarah allies herself with Kerry Grout, a talk show host who exposed Alan's charity fraud and caught him making a death threat live on national television. Piers and Kerry find evidence Alan staged his own assassination. However, while trying to reconstruct the assassination Piers accidentally shoots Kerry. Thanks to false testimony from Sarah and Alan's arresting guard, and Piers' incompetent attempt to confess, Alan is found guilty of Kerry's murder and is sentenced to be hanged by Sidney from one of the gallows he paid to have built. However, he is saved because he paid for cheap balsa wood rather than the stronger, more expensive mahogany, and the entire gallows collapses. Alan's survival is declared an Act of God, and he receives a full pardon.

=== Series 3 (1991) ===
No. overall	No. in series	Title	Directed by	Written by	Original release date
16	1	"Labour of Love"	Graeme Harper	Laurence Marks and Maurice Gran	6 January 1991
Victor Crosby (James Saxon) steals Accrington from the Labour party and declares he will replace Alan as the most right wing MP. Outraged, Alan conspires with Neil Kinnock to leak secret Conservative documents, which Alan steals from Sir Greville while Sir Greville is sleeping with Alan's wife Sarah. Alan realises Crosby is in love with Thatcher and convinces him to send Thatcher a Valentine's Day card, unintentionally providing Alan with his handwriting. Alan also gives him £1,000 to buy a Savile Row suit to impress Thatcher. At the next Prime Minister's Questions, Kinnock reveals the leaked document. Sir Greville is sent a note an expert identifies as Crosby's handwriting, proving it was Crosby that leaked the document to Kinnock. Alan also produces a doctored tape of Crosby on the phone with Kinnock accepting a £1,000 bribe for the documents. When the £1,000 is found in Crosby's pocket, he is expelled from Parliament. Alan retakes his place as the most right wing MP by taking credit for Crosby's plans to reintroduce slavery.
17	2	"The Party's Over"	Graeme Harper	Laurence Marks and Maurice Gran	13 January 1991
Professor Eugene Quail, the Government's oil expert, discovers that the North Sea oil, the foundation of all of the Tories' financial policies, will run out any day now. With the Prime Minister anticipating a snap election to pre-empt a major financial crash, Sir Greville informs Alan that he is now in charge of the Conservative election campaign. Alan manages to boost the Conservatives' lead in the opinion polls, which Sir Greville chastises him for as he was intended to run an unpopular campaign that would allow Labour to win and force them to deal with the oil crisis. After Piers is put in charge of Conservative campaigning, and subsequently destroys the party's poll lead, Labour MP Paddy O'Rouke approaches Alan about the Conservatives' apparent self-sabotage, to which Alan hints about the looming oil crisis. To ensure Labour does not have to deal with the oil crisis, O'Rourke launches a new manifesto proposing a series of costly social programmes with no details regarding funding. Soon after, the Liberal Democrats say outright that they have no idea how to run a government. The news of the oil shortage is leaked to the media, with shares in oil companies hitting an all-time low and opinion polls indicating that all the major parties are tied with single-digit approval rates and that an outright majority of voters would not vote at all. But just as quickly, the crisis passes, as Professor Quail admits to the media that he had made a mistake. It is revealed that the whole thing was orchestrated by Alan: he blackmailed Quail into changing his predictions, shorted the oil companies' stock before the crash, then bought up all the shares at the new low price before the truth was revealed. Quail takes a £1 million payoff for his part in the scheme, and Alan is now secretly one of the richest men in England.
18	3	"Let Them Sniff Cake"	Graeme Harper	Laurence Marks and Maurice Gran	20 January 1991
While appearing on a TV talk show, Alan voices his support for animal testing. Subsequently, Alan becomes the target of animal rights activists, whose methods quickly escalate from protests to death threats and a drive-by shooting of his office. Meanwhile, Alan is contacted by Lord Penistone (John Sessions) to score him a kilogram of cocaine. After taking the Lord's money, Alan sends Piers to make the buy. However, Piers gets robbed. Upon learning that his money is gone, Penistone has to be bought off with Alan's Rolls-Royce Corniche, which leads to his demise when he triggers a car bomb intended for Alan. Returning home, Alan learns that the bombers have been captured, but also discovers that Sarah was actually the one behind the threats and the drive-by shooting as part of a scheme to get Alan to buy her a fur coat that belonged to Greta Garbo.
19	4	"Keeping Mum"	Graeme Harper	Laurence Marks and Maurice Gran	27 January 1991
Alan passes an amendment to the Government's social security bill to cut off all basic state pensions to the elderly, a move that causes hundreds of retirement homes to close. His mother, a filthy, destitute and senile old homeless woman, arrives on his doorstep expecting him to care for her. After a disastrous dinner party where she pours champagne down Fergie's cleavage, Alan attempts to kill her, but she foils him and reveals that she is neither senile nor homeless, but is instead the wealthy owner of Britain's largest retirement home, which is threatened by her son's amendment. She demands he pay her lost profit of £250,000 a year or she will continue to live with him forever. Alan agrees to pay, but also prepares a terrible revenge: he arranges for Piers' mother, whose recent widowing has turned her into a pyromaniac, to become his mother's newest resident.
20	5	"Natural Selection"	Graeme Harper	Laurence Marks and Maurice Gran	3 February 1991
Alan is deselected as the Tory candidate for Haltemprice. The new candidate is Ken Price, the owner of a construction company who, in the next few days, will be presenting his company's IPO. Alan manipulates Julian Whitaker, a junior minister, to create the impression that Whitaker has convinced the Chancellor of the Exchequer to abolish MIRAS, which would destroy the value of Price's business. Thinking that he has lost both his business and his fiancée simultaneously, Price commits suicide, hanging himself from a staircase.
21	6	"Profit of Boom"	Graeme Harper	Laurence Marks and Maurice Gran	10 February 1991
Alan is visiting the Soviet Union when he is contacted by Colonel Gromyko, head of the KGB, and Freddy Ogilvy, director of MI6. The two wish to reignite the Cold War in order to have their budgets restored. He agrees, in exchange for a payment of £100 million, to assassinate Gorbachev. Alan coerces Piers into getting him an invitation to meet with Gorbachev, and arrives bearing a commemorative plaque for Gorbachev containing a time bomb. Alan convinces Piers to present the plaque, but Piers forgets to do so. Alan and Piers escape the tomb, but the bomb destroys the bearer bonds that comprised Alan's fee. Alan and Piers are convicted and sentenced to 100 years hard labour in Siberia, although Sarah manages to arrange for Piers' release, leaving Alan stranded.

=== Series 4 (1992) ===
No. overall	No. in series	Title	Directed by	Written by	Original release date
22	1	"Back from the Mort"	Graeme Harper	Laurence Marks and Maurice Gran	22 November 1992
Alan secures his release from the gulag and returns to England. He soon discovers that he has been replaced as MP for Haltemprice; Sarah is now engaged to Count Otto Von Munchweiller, a Danish nobleman and MEP for East Germany, and has gained possession of Alan's assets by having him declared legally dead; and Sir Greville lost his seat in Parliament after greenlighting the construction of a toxic waste dump in the middle of his constituency. When Piers rejects elevation to the House of Lords to allow Sir Greville to win the seat for himself in a by-election, Alan forces him to comply by threatening to kill his new-born son Gervais, and compensating him with a European commissionership. Alan arranges to have a Bolivian death squad decapitate Otto in bed while Sarah sleeps beside him. Upon discovering this, she goes into shock, which allows Alan to sneak into her hospital room and force her to sign over all her assets to him. Alan then contests Otto's now vacant East German seat, implying that he will eliminate his competition to do so.
23	2	"H*A*S*H"	Graeme Harper	Laurence Marks and Maurice Gran	29 November 1992
Sir Greville, acting in the employ of Big Tobacco, wishes for Alan to manipulate Piers into getting the European Commission to legalise cannabis, which the companies will then make a fortune on. Alan agrees in exchange for a payment of £5,000,000 per year. Meanwhile, Alan discovers that Sarah is now working as a high-priced call girl. Alan arranges for her to seduce the entire membership of the Commission and persuade them to back legalisation, but he is then abducted by members of a drug cartel, who threaten to kill him if he doesn't torpedo the legalisation vote. Alan unveils photos of Sarah in flagrante delicto with each and every member of the Commission. The Commission votes unanimously against legalisation and imposes a century-long embargo on legislation. It is revealed that the cartel members were in fact stooges hired by Sarah to ensure that Alan lost on a substantial profit. Alan is left tied-up in the Atomium.
24	3	"Speaking in Tongues"	Graeme Harper	Laurence Marks and Maurice Gran	6 December 1992
Alan is approached to sign off on the route for the new autobahn. He insists that it should be built straight through a tract of unspoiled forest, rather than an area of industrial dereliction. Alan persuades Piers to sign off on the new autobahn route, a decision that was delayed for a week by the translator strike. Convinced that his decision will save the EEC millions of pounds, Piers authorises construction to begin through the tract of forest, only to discover that Alan has already purchased it all under a false name, and now intends to charge through the nose for it.
25	4	"Heil and Farewell"	Graeme Harper	Laurence Marks and Maurice Gran	13 December 1992
Alan sneaks Nicolae Ceaușescu, Jr. into Germany but finds his scheme imperilled when hundreds of neo-Nazis begin to lay siege to the hostel. Back at his office, Alan buys the cryogenically-preserved penis of Hitler. Returning to the neo-Nazis' hideaway, Alan reveals the penis, which is identified as genuine by Colonel Wessell, a chemical magnate and former member of Hitler's personal guard. Having won the group's trust, Alan orders that they attack a hotel where the Israeli Defense Minister is staying. Alan heads for the Swiss bank where the treasure is kept. Once there, he discovers that the Nazi treasure and the Romanian treasure are one and the same. As Wessell and Ceauşescu fight, Alan seals them inside the vault, setting the time lock for 31 December 1999.
26	5	"A Bigger Splash"	Graeme Harper	Laurence Marks and Maurice Gran	20 December 1992
After purchasing Robert Maxwell's luxury yacht, Alan announces that he will use the yacht to transport humanitarian aid to Herzegovina. However, Maxwell is really alive and hiding out in Bosnia. Once in Herzegovina, Alan offers the leaders of the two factions each a £1 million bribe to agree to a one-hour-long ceasefire. Once the ceasefire is in effect, Alan decides to leave Maxwell behind and instead makes off with the crate containing his stolen millions, but when he gets underway he learns that Maxwell, not the money, is inside the crate, and there never was any loot to be had.
27	6	"The Irresistible Rise of Alan B'Stard"	Graeme Harper	Laurence Marks and Maurice Gran	26 December 1992
A special party conference is called to vote on Conservative support for Britain's continued membership in the EEC, and a fiery speech from Alan leads to a decisive vote to leave. This precipitates a political crisis. A snap election is called, with Alan leading the New Patriotic Party and Sir Greville leading the Progressive Federalists. To prevent Labour winning through split opposition, Piers is made to issue an EEC directive banning trade unions to prompt a party split. After the filming of a Falklands War-themed pornographic film on Sark (bankrolled by Alan) is mistaken for a French invasion, NPP wins a majority in Parliament. However, Paddy O'Rourke, the NPP's alcoholic deputy leader, declares himself Prime Minister as Alan did not contest a seat. Unfazed, Alan proclaims himself Lord Protector, has Paddy arrested, and declares that Britain is now his "plaything". After the Queen telephones New Patriotic headquarters to invite Alan to Buckingham Palace to form a new government, Alan orders her to be brought to his headquarters instead.
28	Special	"A B'Stard Exposed"	Graeme Harper	Laurence Marks and Maurice Gran	30 December 1994
Alan B'Stard MP has returned to domestic Parliament following a Welsh by-election conspicuous by the absence of any opponents. They were found after polling day at the bottom of a coal mine. B'Stard is grilled by veteran broadcaster Brian Walden and reveals his vision for 21st century Britain – including a proposal to construct a Berlin Wall-inspired, thirty-feet high, electrified border control system named, 'B'Stard's Fence'. During the interview, Alan is also tricked into revealing his plans to create his own political party and later pays for Walden's silence. It effectively ignores the last episode.

=== Stage show ===
Episode 2006: The Blair B'Stard Project – Alan B'Stard has created New Labour after making billions on Black Wednesday, installing a failed singer as prime minister and secretly running the country from his bunker at number 9 Downing Street. The show sees Alan attempting to settle a divorce from his wife while playing Al-Qaeda and the Americans off each other in the hunt for weapons of mass destruction (which are being carefully hidden by Alan). Aided by his PPS Frank, the last socialist in the Labour Party and Flora, an ex-Young Conservative turned Blairite lackey, Alan arranges the fake kidnapping of Tony Blair and the ruining of Gordon Brown in order to place himself in ultimate power. The show ends with Alan being named Lord Protector with the declaration, "And Alan takes EVERYTHING".

ALAN B'STARD'S EXTREMELY SECRET WEAPON – The stage show returns, heavily re-written in late 2006, touring into 2007. Alan is plotting to become one of a shadowy elite of politicians who control the world's oil supplies.

=== NOtoAV ===
In 2011, the character of Alan B'Stard, again portrayed by Rik Mayall, was used in the campaign against introducing the AV system to UK Parliamentary elections, in an official television broadcast by NOtoAV. B'Stard appears as a party leader in the near future who, at a pre-general election conference, makes ridiculous promises to the public including the abolition of all taxes and free electricity. When his aides query how they will afford such policies, B'Stard gleefully explains that he won't have to, as when he gets elected, he can go into coalition and blame all the government's failings on his partners. He adds that under AV, even if people don't vote for him he'll probably be elected anyway. The advert ends with B'Stard entering Number 10 as prime minister, accompanied by another party leader.
