= Mark Farmer =

Mark Farmer may refer to:

- Mark Farmer (comics), British comic book artist
- Mark Farmer (actor), British actor

== See also ==
- Mark Farner, American musician
