= Mursal Hedayat =

Mursal Hedayat MBE
- Born: Kabul, Afghanistan
- Education: University of Leeds (BSc)

Mursal Hedayat MBE is a British businesswoman. She was awarded the Barclays Woman in the Community Award 2021.

She is the founder and CEO of tech social enterprise start-up Chatterbox, an online language school that trains and employs refugees as teachers, enabling people to take advantage of the language skills of asylum seekers The refugee teachers have higher education and were often qualified professionals in their countries of origin. Chatterbox works with corporate clients and has gained support from British and Silicon Valley investors. In 2018, Chatterbox won a ‘Next Billion’ Edtech Prize for high impact innovative technology.

Hedayat is a Forbes 30 under 30 and was awarded an MBE in 2021 for services to Social Enterprise, Technology and the Economy.

== Early life ==
Hedayat was born in Kabul, Afghanistan. Her family fled the Taliban when she was four and took refuge in the United Kingdom, where Hedayat grew up in Camden, North London. After moving between primary schools, she completed her secondary education at the Camden School for Girls, where she served as Head Girl. She graduated with a Bachelor of Science (BSc) in Economics and Mathematics from University of Leeds in 2015.
