= Fatal Extraction =

Fatal Extraction may refer to:

- "Fatal Extraction" (The New Statesman), a 1989 TV episode
- "Fatal Extraction" (Only Fools and Horses), a 1993 TV episode
