= Mister Corbett's Ghost =

1987 television supernatural drama

Title card for Mister Corbett's Ghost

Mister Corbett's Ghost is a 1987 supernatural television drama starring Paul Scofield, John Huston and Mark Farmer. Based on the 1969 short story of the same name by Leon Garfield with a screenplay by Gerald Wilson, the production ran at 54 minutes and was produced by VIP Film Productions Ltd and directed by Danny Huston. The costumes were designed by John Mollo, while the score was composed by John Cameron.

== Synopsis ==
It is New Years’ Eve in 1767 in the village of Gospel Oak, and young Benjamin Partridge (Mark Farmer) is apprenticed to the dour apothecary Thomas Corbett (Paul Scofield). Partridge finishes work at 8pm and prepares to leave to join his family and friends for the celebrations, but Corbett finds more and more tasks for him to complete. Eventually, much later, just as Partridge is finally allowed to leave, a customer (John Huston) arrives with an order that must be filled immediately and delivered that same night, beyond the dangerous woods where footpads dwell and convicted criminals swing on gibbets. Corbett forces his reluctant apprentice to deliver the potion to the mysterious customer. On delivering it Partridge is made a tempting offer that results in the sudden death of Corbett, who consequently haunts his young apprentice who comes to regret his hasty choice.

== Cast ==
- Paul Scofield as Apothecary Thomas Corbett
- John Huston as Soul Collector
- Burgess Meredith as Mad Tom
- Mark Farmer as Benjamin Partridge
- Alexei Sayle as Tollgate Keeper
- Mark Lewis as Tom Cheek
- Jools Holland as Defrocked Priest
- Mick O'Donoghue as Marble Eye
- Granville Saxton as The Gentleman
- Eileen Nicholas as Mrs Alice Corbett
- Wayne Norman as Apprentice
- Clark Flanagan as Apprentice
- David Nunn as Apprentice
- Lill Roughley as Mrs Partridge
- Veronica Clifford as Landlord's Wife
- Kenneth Gilbert as Uncle Harry
- Ted Burnett as Landlord
- Andrew Paul as Villager
- David Parfitt as Villager
- Elaine Lordan as Villager
- Amy Shindler as Villager

== Production ==
Location filming took place at the village shop and the Castle Inn in Chiddingstone in Kent in the UK.

The film was the first feature directed by Danny Huston and the last film in which his father John Huston appeared as an actor.
