= Love Hurts (TV series) =

1992–1994 UK TV series

- Genre: Comedy drama
- Created by: Maurice Gran; Laurence Marks
- Starring: Adam Faith; Zoë Wanamaker; Jane Lapotaire; Tony Selby; Richard Cordery
- Country of origin: United Kingdom
- Original language: English
- No. of series: 3
- No. of episodes: 30

Production
- Executive producer: Allan McKeown
- Running time: 50 minutes
- Production company: Alomo Productions

Original release
- Network: BBC1
- Release: 3 January 1992 – 18 March 1994

Love Hurts is a British comedy-drama series that was broadcast from 3 January 1992 to 18 March 1994 on BBC1. It was scripted by Laurence Marks and Maurice Gran and starred Adam Faith as Frank Carver, Zoë Wanamaker as Tessa Piggott, Tony Selby as Max Taplow and Jane Lapotaire as Diane Warburg. Zoë Wanamaker received a 1993 Best Actress BAFTA nomination for her work in the series.

The theme tune was written by Alan Hawkshaw and performed by Peter Polycarpou.

== Plot ==
When her married long-term boyfriend (who was also her boss) decides to end their relationship for a younger woman, Tessa Piggott (Zoë Wanamaker) leaves her high powered City career and, determined to change her life and leave the rat race, with the help of an old university friend (Jane Lapotaire) – who is also a rabbi, takes a job supervising a charitable Third World development agency. She also resolves to give up relationships, until that is, she meets wealthy and roguish 'hands on' entrepreneur Frank Carver (Adam Faith), who has built up his successful plumbing business from scratch, and romance beckons. Their 'on/off' romance follows throughout the three series, often complicated by their numerous friends, family and colleagues.

== Series overview ==
Series overview
Series	Episodes	Originally released	
Series	Episodes	First released	Last released
1	10	3 January 1992	6 March 1992
2	10	1 January 1993	5 March 1993
3	10	14 January 1994	18 March 1994

== Episodes ==
=== Series 1 (1992) ===
No. overall	No. in series	Title	Original release date
1	1	"Crawling from the wreckage"	3 January 1992
2	2	"Take it to the limit"	10 January 1992
3	3	"Walk right back"	17 January 1992
4	4	"Relative values"	24 January 1992
5	5	"Cured"	31 January 1992
6	6	"Stormy weather"	7 February 1992
7	7	"A day in the life"	14 February 1992
8	8	"Charity begins at home"	21 February 1992
9	9	"Who's sorry now?"	28 February 1992
10	10	"Let's do it"	6 March 1992

=== Series 2 (1993) ===
No. overall	No. in series	Title	Original release date
11	1	"Strictly business"	1 January 1993
12	2	"Cold comfort"	8 January 1993
13	3	"The Max Factor"	15 January 1993
14	4	"Your money or your life"	22 January 1993
15	5	"Band of Gold"	29 January 1993
16	6	"Face the Music"	5 February 1993
17	7	"If the Cap fits"	12 February 1993
18	8	"Just a bit of business"	19 February 1993
19	9	"For a Few Dollars More"	26 February 1993
20	10	"Love for sale"	5 March 1993

=== Series 3 (1994) ===
No. overall	No. in series	Title	Original release date
21	1	"Blue Heaven"	14 January 1994
22	2	"Happy Families"	21 January 1994
23	3	"The Parent Trap"	28 January 1994
24	4	"Promises"	4 February 1994
25	5	"Win some, lose some"	11 February 1994
26	6	"The Morning after"	18 February 1994
27	7	"Time to go home"	25 February 1994
28	8	"Drawing the line"	4 March 1994
29	9	"Tracks of my tears"	11 March 1994
30	10	"Cards on the table"	18 March 1994
