= Shine on Harvey Moon =

British television series

- Created by: Laurence Marks; Maurice Gran
- Starring: Suzanne Bertish; Kenneth Cranham; Leonard Fenton; Nicky Henson; Nigel Planer; Pauline Quirke; Linda Robson; Colin Salmon; Elizabeth Spriggs; Maggie Steed; Fiona Victory; Lee Whitlock; Derek Benfield
- Country of origin: United Kingdom
- Original language: English
- No. of series: 5
- No. of episodes: 41 (List of episodes)

Production
- Executive producer: Allan McKeown
- Producers: Central Television (1982–1985); Meridian Broadcasting (1995); WitzEnd Productions (1982–1985, 1995)
- Running time: 30 minutes (series 1 and 5); 60 minutes (series 2–4)

Original release
- Network: ITV
- Release: 8 January 1982 – 18 August 1995

Shine on Harvey Moon is a British television series made by WitzEnd Productions and Central Television for ITV from 8 January 1982 to 23 August 1985 and briefly revived in 1995 by Meridian Broadcasting.

This generally light-hearted series was created by comedy writers Laurence Marks and Maurice Gran. The series is set in the East End of London shortly after the Second World War. On being demobbed, RAF serviceman Harvey Moon, played by Kenneth Cranham, returns home and finds his family involved in various troubles. His wife Rita, played by Maggie Steed, is not interested in resuming their relationship and works in a seedy nightclub frequented by American servicemen. He becomes involved with the Labour Party and campaigns against the local Hackney branch of the far right Union Movement, after his mother expresses support for the UM, albeit briefly.

The name of the series is a wordplay on the title of the popular 1908 song "Shine On, Harvest Moon!". The first series was commissioned and recorded by ATV (the forerunner to Central Television), at their Elstree studios, with the second series recorded in the same studios under the ownership of Central Television; the remaining series was filmed at Central's new facilities in Nottingham.

== Cast ==
- Kenneth Cranham (series 1 to 4) and Nicky Henson (series 5) as Harvey Moon
- Maggie Steed as Rita Moon
- Linda Robson as Maggie Moon
- Lee Whitlock as Stanley Moon
- Elizabeth Spriggs as Violet "Nan" Moon
- Nigel Planer as Lou Lewis
- Fiona Victory as Harriet Wright (series 1 and 2)
- Leonard Fenton as Erich Gottlieb (series 3 and 4)
- Suzanne Bertish as Frieda Gottlieb (series 3 and 4)
- Mark Kingston as Leo Brandon (series 3 and 4)
- Tenniel Evans as Geoff Barratt (series 3 and 4)
- Pauline Quirke as Veronica Spicer (series 3 to 5)
- Colin Salmon as Noah Hawksley (series 5)

== Episodes ==
| Series | Episodes | Originally released | |
| Series | Episodes | First released | Last released |
|---|---|---|---|
| 1 | 6 | 8 January 1982 | 12 February 1982 |
| 2 | 6 | 10 September 1982 | 15 October 1982 |
| 3 | 9 | 1 June 1984 | 27 July 1984 |
| 4 | 8 | 5 July 1985 | 23 August 1985 |
| 5 | 12 | 23 April 1995 | 18 August 1995 |

== DVD releases ==
Three 3-disc DVD box sets have been released by Acorn Media UK. The first comprises all episodes from series 2 and selected episodes from series 1 and the other, released in 2007, contains all episodes of series 3. In 2012 a three disc set was released containing all episodes of series 4.
