= Get Back (TV series) =

- Created by: Maurice Gran; Laurence Marks
- Starring: Ray Winstone; Carol Harrison; Larry Lamb; Jane Booker; John Bardon; Kate Winslet; Michelle Cattini
- Composer: Ray Russell
- Country of origin: United Kingdom
- Original language: English
- No. of series: 2
- No. of episodes: 15

Production
- Producers: Rosie Bunting; Bernard McKenna
- Running time: 30 minutes
- Production company: Alomo Productions

Original release
- Network: BBC1
- Release: 26 October 1992 – 15 November 1993

Get Back is a British sitcom written by Laurence Marks and Maurice Gran which ran for two series between 26 October 1992 and 15 November 1993 on BBC1. It followed the Sweet family, led by father Martin, played by Ray Winstone, a self-made man who lost his money in the recession of the early 1990s and has to downsize, moving in with his father in a council flat. It is notable for the early appearance of Kate Winslet, who played one of the family's daughters.

The series title, the character names and the titles of each episode were all inspired by Beatles songs.

== Characters ==
- Ray Winstone as Martin Sweet
- Carol Harrison as Loretta Sweet
- Kate Winslet as Eleanor Sweet
- Michelle Cattini as Joanne 'Jojo' Sweet
- Larry Lamb as Albert Sweet
- Jane Booker as Prudence Sweet
- John Bardon as Bernie Sweet
- George 'Zoot' Money as Bungalow Bill
- Shirley Stelfox as Lucy (Series 1)

== List of episodes ==
=== Series 1 (1992) ===
No. overall	No. in series	Title	Directed by	Written by	Original release date
1	1	"Help!"	Graeme Harper	Laurence Marks and Maurice Gran	26 October 1992
Martin Sweet and his brother Albert grew up in a council flat in Finsbury Park, with their father Bernie. Both Martin and Albert are successful, wealthy businessmen. However, Martin is made bankrupt in the recession. As a result of this, he has to sell his clothing business, along with his home in Hatch End, and his Rolls Royce. In addition, Martin has to withdraw his daughters from their school. Unfortunately, Martin, his wife Loretta, and their daughters Eleanor and Jojo have to move back to the council flat.
2	2	"We Can Work It Out"	Graeme Harper	Laurence Marks and Maurice Gran	2 November 1992
Martin and Loretta go to a dinner party at Albert and Prudence's. Albert and Prudence disagree on a dress that Prudence wears, with Prudence not wanting to show off her wealth, but Albert insists that Martin and Loretta won't mind. Albert turns out to be wrong, and Loretta believes that Prudence is rubbing their noses in their being lower class. Martin insults a friend of Albert, who owns a shop, and wanted to offer him a job. Martin is upset when he discovers that their upper class home is being put on auction. Martin and Bernie attend the auction, where Martin raises the bid to £190,000. Unbeknownst to Martin and Loretta, Albert had a man bid on the house, which he was going to rent back to Martin and Loretta.
3	3	"Not a Second Time"	Graeme Harper	Gary Lawson and John Phelps	9 November 1992
Loretta moans about maintaining the flat, whilst Martin looks for two grand, so that he can purchase a van and a market stall. Prudence invites Eleanor on holiday in Vienna with her and Albert. Albert lends Martin the money for the market stall and van, which is successful until the van is burnt and the stock is stolen.
4	4	"Don't Let Me Down"	Graeme Harper	Gary Lawson and John Phelps	16 November 1992
Martin needs to work out a way to cover the costs of his Arsenal season ticket. Eleanor tries to skip her first day of school by pretending to be ill. Loretta gets consternation from Albert, when she asks for a job as a window dresser. Albert takes the season ticket back, and Martin finds a job, working the turnstiles at the Arsenal. Eleanor finds that the new school isn't as bad as she anticipated.
5	5	"I Don't Want to See You Again"	Graeme Harper	Gary Lawson and John Phelps	23 November 1992
Martin and Loretta are called in by Jojo's teacher to discuss her unruly behaviour at school. After having a row with Lucy over having to buy a new suit, Bernie moves back. The shock discovery of a building society book comes as a surprise.
6	6	"You Can't Do That"	Graeme Harper	Gary Lawson and John Phelps	30 November 1992
Lucy causes a stir, when she shows off the engagement ring that Bernie gave to her, and Prudence insists on throwing an engagement party for them. Loretta is unhappy about a plan to buy Bernie's flat as an investment.
7	7	"You Never Give Me Your Money"	Graeme Harper	Laurence Marks and Maurice Gran	7 December 1992
Albert tries to assist Eleanor in avoiding a potentially embarrassing exchange visit. Martin gets some work as a debt collector agent, and Bernie is infuriated when he discovers about Lucy's extravagant spending habits.

=== Series 2 (1993) ===
No. overall	No. in series	Title	Directed by	Written by	Original release date
8	1	"She's Leaving Home"	Terry Kinane	Gary Lawson and John Phelps	27 September 1993
After returning alone from Malaga, Bernie is shocked to find that his flat has been redecorated. And Loretta is furious when discovers the truth about Martin's occupation. Eleanor and Jojo find a common bond through separation.
9	2	"Can't Buy Me Love"	Terry Kinane	Laurence Marks and Maurice Gran	4 October 1993
Martin hits a snag when his financial plans go awry. Eleanor is arrested for busking and tries to avoid a criminal record by providing a false name. A private detective investigates some allegations made about Albert's marriage.
10	3	"Drive My Car"	Terry Kinane	Gary Lawson and John Phelps	11 October 1993
Martin is enthusiastic about getting a new job as a salesman for Doggie Chunks, a dodgy financial deal wipes out Albert's savings and tries his best to avoid a bailiff who is determined to repossess his flat. Loretta tries out modelling when she gets the attention of a footwear fashion photographer.
11	4	"Tomorrow Never Knows"	Terry Kinane	Paul Makin	18 October 1993
Prudence is taught about the family tradition of scoring Westerns, Albert and Martin argue over business matters and fall out. Bernie tries to mediate between the sparring siblings and invertedly gets himself caught in the middle.
12	5	"Money"	Terry Kinane	Bernard McKenna	25 October 1993
Suspicion is in the air, when Prudence starts to get distrustful about Albert's dodgy business dealings. Martin and Loretta are in the red, when they are faced with a bar tab they cannot pay, and Jojo's crush for a Pizza boy leads to underwhelming results, when he removes his helmet.
13	6	"Don't Bother Me"	Terry Kinane	Paul Makin	1 November 1993
The flat is robbed after a spate of similar incidents in the local area, so Bernie tries to demand a cut before agreeing to claim on the insurance. Martin is faced with a bullying neighbour upstairs and tries to summon up the courage to confront the bully.
14	7	"Ticket to Ride"	Terry Kinane	Gary Lawson and John Phelps	8 November 1993
Martin is a given a week's notice on the flat and Loretta is far from pleased about it. Albert tries to help by getting them a flat in Barking. And Bernie is rushed to hospital after collapsing during a football game.
15	8	"She's a Woman"	Terry Kinane	Gary Lawson and John Phelps	15 November 1993
It's Loretta's birthday, and she's curious what her daughters have got for her. Martin confronts Albert about the discovery of a pregnancy testing kit and struggles to come to terms when he discovers that Eleanor has been in a steady relationship with a man named Tim.
