= Young, Gifted and Broke =

1989 British ITV sitcom

- Genre: Sitcom
- Created by: Laurence Marks; Maurice Gran
- Written by: Gary Lawson; John Phelps
- Starring: Elena Ferrari; James Hazeldine; Cheryl Miller; Mark Monero; Simon O'Brien; Steven O'Donnell; Jason Rush; Mary Healy; Emma-Kate Davies
- Country of origin: United Kingdom
- Original language: English
- No. of series: 1
- No. of episodes: 7

Production
- Executive producer: Ray Butt
- Producer: Margaret Bottomley
- Production locations: Birmingham, West Midlands, England, UK
- Running time: 30 minutes
- Production company: Central Independent Television

Original release
- Network: ITV
- Release: 3 June – 15 July 1989

Young, Gifted and Broke was a 1989 British sitcom series created by Laurence Marks and Maurice Gran, airing on ITV. The show stars Elena Ferrari, Cheryl Miller, Mark Monero, Jason Rush and Emma-Kate Davies as five teenagers who are working at an electronics shop on a Youth Training Scheme. James Hazeldine plays their teacher Paul and Mary Healy plays Paul's wife Emma.

Only seven episodes were produced.

== Cast ==
- Elena Ferrari as Tamsin
- James Hazeldine as Frank
- Cheryl Miller as Aysha
- Mark Monero as Adrian
- Simon O'Brien as Paul
- Steven O'Donnell as Bolton
- Jason Rush as Greg
- Mary Healy as Emma
- Emma-Kate Davies as Lucy
- Bobby Bragg as Alan

== Episodes ==
No.	Original release date
1	3 June 1989
2	10 June 1989
3	17 June 1989
4	24 June 1989
5	1 July 1989
6	8 July 1989
7	15 July 1989
