= Save the Last Dance for Me (musical) =

- Official CD featuring music from the show. Cover shows Jason Denton as Curtis and Megan Jones as Marie.
- Music: Mort Shuman & others
- Lyrics: Doc Pomus & others
- Book: Laurence Marks & Maurice Gran
- Premiere: January 9th, 2012: Churchill Theatre
- Productions: 2012 UK Tour; 2013 UK Tour; 2016 UK Tour

Save the Last Dance for Me is a jukebox musical written by Laurence Marks and Maurice Gran. It primarily uses songs from the 1960s written by Doc Pomus and Mort Shuman such as A Teenager in Love, Sweets For My Sweet, Little Sister, Viva Las Vegas, Can't Get Used to Losing You and the title song Save the Last Dance for Me. It opened at the Churchill Theatre Bromley on 9 January 2012 before embarking on a nationwide tour. A spin-off production from Dreamboats and Petticoats, it reunited the writing team with producer Bill Kenwright and director Keith Strachan. The choreography was by Olivier Award winner, Bill Deamer. As was the case in Dreamboats and Petticoats, all of the music was played live by the actors on stage. A new production has been announced, due to open April 2016 at Windsor Theatre Royal, before touring the UK again.

== Plot ==
In 1963, teen sisters Jennifer and Marie go on holiday to a caravan in Lowestoft without their parents. There they meet handsome American airman Milton who is stationed at a local airbase and invites the sisters to a dance at the base. At the dance youngest sister Marie meets and eventually falls in love with Curtis, a black airman from Tennessee. The story deals with themes of racial tension both in the American military and British society, as well as Anglo-American relations in the 1960s.

== Music ==
The musical was advertised as featuring the hits of Doc Pomus & Mort Shuman and included many of their songs, although some songs were included that the duo did not write together and some songs, like Way Down Yonder in New Orleans, that were not written by either of them. A double CD compilation album was released in May 2012.

== Cast ==
Role	Current cast (2016)	Original cast (2012)	2013 cast	Autumn 2013 cast
Marie	Elizabeth Carter	Megan Jones	Elizabeth Carter	Elizabeth Carter
Curtis	Wayne Robinson (Jason Denton at certain performances)	Jason Denton	Kieran McGinn	Kieran McGinn
Milton	Antony Costa	AJ Dean	Lee Honey-Jones	Lee Honey-Jones
Jennifer	Lola Saunders	Hannah Frederick	Verity Jones	Verity Jones
Carlo	Alan Howell	Graham Weaver	Alan Howell	Alan Howell
Cookie	Michael Kantola	Marc McBride	Michael Kantola (Patrick Burbridge at certain performances)	Michael Kantola
Marvin	Chris Coxon	Robert Dalton	Chris Coxon	Patrick Burbridge (Chris Coxon at certain performances)
Johnny	Sheridan Lloyd	Chris Coxon	Greg Davidson	Sheldon Green
Elvis	Andrew Joseph	Dan Church	Stewart McCheyne	Dan Graham
Donnie	Josef Pitura Riley	Michael Paver	Josef Pitura Riley	Alistair Hoyle
Rufus	Sackie Osakonor	Tosh Wanogho-Maud	Jay Perry	Jay Perry
Della/Doris	Anna Campkin	Laura Emmit	Niamh Bracken	Olive Robinson
Cathy	Hannah Nicholas	Robyn Manning	Hannah Nicholas	Hannah Nicholas
Mildred	Rachel Nottingham	Christine Holman	Sally Peerless	Lauren Storer
Cyril	Kieran Kuypers	Harry Myers	Alex Hammond	Kieran Kuypers
Clyde	Joe McCourt	Richard Rolfe	Joe McCourt	Joe McCourt
Swing	Kate Hardisty	n/a	Emma Jayne Morton	Emma Jayne Morton

== Reception ==
The critical reception was mixed, with many reviewers judging the storyline to be a weak point, while the cast and musicians' performances were often praised. It was often deemed inferior in comparison to Dreamboats and Petticoats. Catherine Jones of the Liverpool Echo described the plot as "purely a vehicle to introduce the American songwriters’ extensive back catalogue", while Phil Williams of the North Wales Pioneer called the show "unmissable", "sheer quality" with "excellent musicians". Bruce Blacklaw of The Scotsman was particularly scathing, and referred to the use of "cack-handed race and gender politics", with "all the depth of a burst paddling pool", although he conceded that the show was about the music and that the audience were dancing in the aisles.
