= Prudence at Number 10 =

Prudence at Number 10 is a fictional diary wishing to be the private thoughts of Prudence Harbinger, former (United Kingdom) Prime Minister Gordon Brown's Director of Media Liaison, but actually written for publication in British newspaper The Sunday Telegraph by Laurence Marks and Maurice Gran, the authors of the column's predecessor Alan B'Stard's Diary.

In the first episode we are introduced to a single fast-track career civil-servant who carries a torch for the Iron Chancellor since working on his team a decade before. Her heart leaps when he rings her to renew their toxic relationship.
