= Relative Strangers (TV series) =

Television series

- Genre: Sitcom
- Written by: Maurice Gran; Laurence Marks
- Starring: Mark Farmer; Matthew Kelly
- Country of origin: United Kingdom
- Original language: English
- No. of series: 2
- No. of episodes: 19

Production
- Running time: 30 minutes
- Production company: Humphrey Barclay Productions

Original release
- Network: Channel 4
- Release: 14 January 1985 – 9 March 1987

Relative Strangers is a British comedy television series which originally aired on Channel 4 between 14 January 1985 and 9 March 1987.

== Main cast ==
- Mark Farmer as John
- Matthew Kelly as Fitz
- David Battley as Gerald
- Bernard Gallagher as Percy Fisher

== Bibliography ==
- Vahimagi, Tise . British Television: An Illustrated Guide. Oxford University Press, 1996.
