= Matthew Kelly =

British actor and television presenter (born 1950)

- Born: David Allan Kelly; 9 May 1950 (age 76); Davyhulme, Lancashire, England
- Education: Manchester Metropolitan School of Theatre; The Open University
- Occupations: Actor; presenter
- Years active: 1980–present
- Known for: Television presenter and actor
- Television: Game for a Laugh (1981–1985); You Bet! (1991–1995); Stars in Their Eyes (1993–2004); After They Were Famous (1999–2005)

Matthew Kelly (born David Allan Kelly, 9 May 1950) is an English actor and television presenter. Having been trained as a theatre actor, he first came to public prominence as a television sitcom actor, game-show panellist and television presenter of ITV light entertainment shows such as Game for a Laugh, You Bet! and Stars in Their Eyes. In the 2000s he returned to acting, appearing in several West End productions and playing television roles.

== Early life and education ==
Kelly was involved with Urmston Musical Theatre in Urmston, Lancashire, most notably playing the role of Louis in a production of The King and I in 1963. Kelly appeared regularly at Liverpool's Everyman Theatre.

He is a former member of the Workers' Revolutionary Party.

In his early forties, he studied at the Open University where he gained a degree in psychology.

== Career ==
Kelly's first major TV appearances came in the ITV sitcom Holding the Fort (1980–82), and as a panellist in the game show Punchlines (1981–84), hosted by Lennie Bennett on ITV, but he became more famous as part of the original presenting team on Game for a Laugh, for the same producers and network. He was the original presenter of Children's ITV) when launched in January 1983, and returned to the role sporadically over the next few years. He was the subject of an edition of This Is Your Life in 1983 when he was surprised by Eamonn Andrews in London's Trafalgar Square.

For the next 14 years his work centred on light entertainment shows such as Kelly's Eye (TVS sketch show 1985), You Bet! (LWT/ITV) (1991–95) and, most notably, Stars in Their Eyes (Granada/ITV), which he took over from Russ Abbot, who was brought in as a temporary host after original presenter Leslie Crowther suffered serious head injuries in a car crash in October 1992. Abbot had only hosted one episode, an Elvis Presley special. However, it later became apparent that Crowther would not be able to return, as he retired in 1994, and then died two years later. Therefore, Kelly became the permanent host of the show until he left in March 2004. Simultaneously, he was narrator for the ITV series After They Were Famous from 1999 to 2005. He continued to act occasionally, notably in the Channel 4 comedy Relative Strangers, and in the theatre production of The Cabinet of Dr. Caligari.

Following his departure from Stars in Their Eyes Kelly returned to acting full-time. He has appeared in a number of television and theatre productions. In 2005, he was a member of the cast in BBC One's Bleak House as Mr Turveydrop. He also played a serial killer in 2005's Cold Blood and its 2007 sequel, as well as the explorer Giovanni Belzoni in BBC One's Egypt. On the stage he won an Olivier Award in 2004 for his portrayal of Lennie in John Steinbeck's Of Mice and Men at the Savoy Theatre. Other work includes Ripafratta in Mirandolina at the Royal Exchange Theatre in August 2006, which he swiftly followed by appearing as a well-received Antonio Salieri in Peter Shaffer's play Amadeus. For a short period in summer 2007 he played the character Willie Thorn (not the snooker player) in the farce Out For Justice in Sydney, Australia's Royal Court Theatre.

From December 2008 to January 2009, he joined Stefanie Powers, Craig McLachlan and Christopher Biggins at the Mayflower Theatre in Southampton to play May, one of the ugly sisters, in the pantomime Cinderella alongside his son Matthew Rixon. In 2009, he was on stage to high critical acclaim, in Howard Barker's Victory: Choices in Reaction, at the Arcola Theatre, then as George in Who's Afraid of Virginia Woolf? at the Garrick Theatre, Lichfield, followed by a season at London's Trafalgar Studios. The summer was spent as Pandarus in Shakespeare's Troilus and Cressida at the Globe in London. He opened in Comedians at the Lyric Theatre, Hammersmith, in October 2009.

In January 2010, Kelly replaced Simon Callow as Pozzo in the revival of Waiting for Godot at the Theatre Royal Haymarket, alongside Ian McKellen (Estragon), Roger Rees (Vladimir) and Ronald Pickup (Lucky). He continued in the successful production of Waiting for Godot at the Comedy Theatre, Melbourne, in May 2010.

In November 2010, Kelly was awarded an honorary doctorate by the University of Chester. In March 2012, he returned to mainstream television by appearing in the ITV comedy Benidorm, playing Cyril Babcock, a judge for the hotel's dance competition; he reprised the role in 2014. During the 2012 Edinburgh Festival Fringe, he played the role of Frank in a production of the play Educating Rita. In 2014, Kelly acted in a short drama called Cherry Cake, and in 2016, he played a one-off role of a carer/grandad in the TV series Casualty. In 2018, he hosted the documentary series Top of the Box. In September 2019, Kelly appeared as the Toy Shop owner in the stage production of Big. In May 2024, he appeared as Harold in the Inside No. 9 episode "Boo to a Goose". In 2025, Kelly appeared as King Brunwin/Brian in the "Dragon Castle" episode of Not Going Out.

In 2026 he played Estragon in Waiting for Godot at the Citizens Theatre in Glasgow and at the Octagon Theatre in Bolton.

== Selected filmography ==
Year	Title	Role	Notes
1978	Pickersgill People	Bogdan Kershaw	Episode: "The Primitive"
1978	Play for Today	Bill	Episode: "One Bummer News Day"
1979	Room Service	Dick Sedgewick	7 episodes
1980 - 1982	Holding the Fort	Fitz	20 episodes
1981	Funny Man	Basil Whipp	Episode: "Ships That Pass"
1984	Gabrielle and the Doodleman	Doodleman	Film
1985 - 1987	Relative Strangers	Fitz	19 episodes
1995	Last of the Summer Wine	Policeman	Episode: "A Leg Up for Christmas"
1997	Knight School	King Edward	Episode: "The New Boy"
2002	Doctors	Peter Harvey	Episode: "Who's Going to Know?"
2005 - 2008	Cold Blood	Brian Wicklow	4 episodes
2005	Bleak House	Old Mr. Turveydrop	5 episodes (TV mini-series)
2006	Marple	Donald Garfield	Episode: "The Sittaford Mystery"
2006	Where the Heart Is	Barry	Episode: "Greater Love"
2011	Casualty	Andrew Brookfield	2 episodes
2012 - 2014	Benidorm	Cyril Babcock	4 episodes
2013	M.I. High	Dr. Steinberg	Episode: "The Final Endgame"
2013	Moving On	John	Episode: "The Shrine"
2015	Burn Burn Burn	Doug	Film
2021	Going the Distance	Frank	TV movie
2024	Inside No. 9	Harold	Episode: "Boo a Goose"
2024	Murder They Hope	Gregor	Episode: "Apocalypse Slough"
2025	Not Going Out	King Brunwin/ Brian	Episode: "Dragon Castle"

== Personal life ==
Kelly married Sarah Gray in 1975. They have mostly lived separately, he in London and she in Cheshire and then West Sussex.

In January 2003, Kelly was arrested by police over allegations of child sex abuse, which arose as part of Operation Arundel. The following month he was cleared of all charges. In response to his public arrest, and the later media fallout that drew public criticism, his treatment was raised as a motion in Parliament to consider "ways to protect the anonymity of those investigated until formally charged with an offence." This was later debated within Parliament as part of a wider response to investigations into allegations of historical crimes. In the same year, Kelly appeared on The Frank Skinner Show to discuss the host's jokes, which took aim at his alleged abuse of children.
