= Holding the Fort =

British television series

- Genre: Comedy
- Created by: Maurice Gran; Laurence Marks
- Starring: Peter Davison; Patricia Hodge; Matthew Kelly; Christopher Godwin
- Country of origin: United Kingdom
- Original language: English
- No. of series: 3
- No. of episodes: 20

Production
- Running time: 30 minutes
- Production company: London Weekend Television

Original release
- Network: ITV
- Release: 5 September 1980 – 29 August 1982

Holding the Fort is an ITV sitcom starring Peter Davison, Patricia Hodge and Matthew Kelly.

== Plot ==
The series is a role-reversal comedy in which Russell Milburn (Davison) becomes a 'house-husband' to raise his baby daughter while his wife Penny (Hodge), a captain in the Women's Royal Army Corps, goes out to work. Russell's friend Fitzroy, or "Fitz" (Kelly), adds to the comic tension by encouraging Russell's enthusiasm for football, pacifism and beer.

== Cast ==
- Peter Davison as Russell Milburn
- Patricia Hodge as Penny Milburn
- Matthew Kelly as Fitz
- Christopher Godwin as Hector Quilley
- Victoria Kendall as Emma Milburn
- Christopher Benjamin as Col. Aubrey Sanderson
- Maev Alexander as Jennifer Quilley
- Keith Barron as Trevor Chesterton
- Tony Millan as Daniel

== Production ==
It was an early product of the writing team of Laurence Marks and Maurice Gran. Three series were recorded, a total of twenty episodes, first aired from 1980 to 1982, concurrent with Davison also starring in Doctor Who and Sink or Swim. It was made for the ITV network by LWT.
