= Roll Over Beethoven (TV series) =

- Genre: Sitcom
- Written by: Laurence Marks; Maurice Gran
- Directed by: Derrick Goodwin (eps. 1–6); Nic Phillips (eps. 7–13)
- Starring: Liza Goddard; Nigel Planer; Richard Vernon
- Country of origin: United Kingdom
- Original language: English
- No. of series: 1
- No. of episodes: 13

Production
- Executive producer: Allan McKeown
- Producer: Tony Charles
- Running time: 30 minutes
- Production company: Central Independent Television

Original release
- Network: ITV
- Release: 25 February – 27 May 1985

Roll Over Beethoven is a British television sitcom produced by Central Independent Television and transmitted on the ITV network in 1985.

Written by the duo Laurence Marks and Maurice Gran, the series starred Nigel Planer as millionaire pop star Nigel Cochrane, who turns life in a sleepy Surrey village upside down when he purchases the manor house, installing a recording studio in his new home and planning to record his first solo album there. He enlists the help of local piano teacher Belinda Purcell (Liza Goddard) to help him master the keyboard. An unlikely friendship – then romance – develops between the two as they collaborate on the album, much to the disapproval of Belinda's father, retired schoolmaster Oliver (Richard Vernon). As the series progresses, Nigel briefly leaves to go on a promotional tour of the album, while Belinda develops her talent for composing by working on an album of her own.

ITV screened all thirteen episodes in one go with a week's break in April 1985, but Roll Over Beethoven was in fact recorded in two separate production blocks. The first six episodes were directed by Derrick Goodwin, whilst Nic Phillips took over for episodes 7–13.

In an episode of The Confessional with Stephen Mangan first broadcast on BBC Radio 4 in June 2021, Nigel Planer revealed that he chose to go on tour rather than doing a second series of Roll Over Beethoven, bringing an abrupt end to the programme.

== Cast ==
- Liza Goddard – Belinda Purcell
- Nigel Planer – Nigel Cochrane (eps. 1–8 & 12)
- Richard Vernon – Oliver Purcell
- Desmond McNamara – Lem
- Emlyn Price – Marvin Sertleman (eps. 9–13)

== Episodes ==
No.	Directed by	Written by	Original release date
1	Derrick Goodwin	Laurence Marks and Maurice Gran	25 February 1985
2	Derrick Goodwin	Laurence Marks and Maurice Gran	4 March 1985
3	Derrick Goodwin	Laurence Marks and Maurice Gran	11 March 1985
4	Derrick Goodwin	Laurence Marks and Maurice Gran	18 March 1985
5	Derrick Goodwin	Laurence Marks and Maurice Gran	25 March 1985
6	Derrick Goodwin	Laurence Marks and Maurice Gran	1 April 1985
7	Nic Phillips	Laurence Marks and Maurice Gran	15 April 1985
8	Nic Phillips	Peter Makin	22 April 1985
9	Nic Phillips	Laurence Marks and Maurice Gran	29 April 1985
10	Nic Phillips	Peter Makin	6 May 1985
11	Nic Phillips	Laurence Marks and Maurice Gran	13 May 1985
12	Nic Phillips	Laurence Marks and Maurice Gran	20 May 1985
13	Nic Phillips	Laurence Marks and Maurice Gran	27 May 1985
