= The New Statesman (1987 TV series) =

British TV sitcom (1987–1994)

- Series title card
- Genre: Sitcom; Political satire
- Created by: Laurence Marks; Maurice Gran
- Starring: Rik Mayall; Marsha Fitzalan; Michael Troughton
- Theme music composer: Modest Mussorgsky arrangement by Alan Hawkshaw
- Country of origin: United Kingdom
- Original language: English
- No. of series: 4
- No. of episodes: 26 + 3 specials (list of episodes)

Production
- Executive producers: John Bartlett; Allan McKeown; Michael Pilsworth; David Reynolds
- Running time: Approx. 24–25 minutes (excluding adverts)
- Production companies: Yorkshire Television (1987, 1989–1992); Alomo Productions (1992 & 1994)

Original release
- Network: ITV (1987, 1989–1992); BBC One (specials, 1988 & 1994)
- Release: 13 September 1987 – 30 December 1994

The New Statesman is a British political satire sitcom that ran from 1987 to 1994, satirising the United Kingdom's Conservative government of the period. It was written by Laurence Marks and Maurice Gran at the request of, and as a starring vehicle for, its principal actor Rik Mayall.

The programme was produced by the ITV franchise Yorkshire Television, although the BBC made two special episodes: one in 1988, the other in 1994. It won the BAFTA Award for Best Comedy Series in 1991.

== Premise ==
The New Statesman follows Alan B'Stard, a Conservative politician who has just won an election for the fictional constituency of Haltemprice (not to be confused with the actual constituency of Haltemprice and Howden), and is now an MP. The show is mostly set in B'Stard's antechambers in the Palace of Westminster and features Piers Fletcher-Dervish, a fellow MP who is B'Stard's gullible upper-class sidekick, played by Michael Troughton.

== Production ==
In 1985, actor Rik Mayall, writers Laurence Marks and Maurice Gran, and Vernon Lawrence, who was the controller of light entertainment at Yorkshire Television, met at a symposium on comedy organized by the Independent Broadcasting Authority. During the meeting, Lawrence had an idea for a potential new series featuring the other three. Marks and Gran declined as they had disliked working with an alternative comedian during Roll Over Beethoven. When Mayall, Marks and Gran appeared in the same episode of Wogan months later, they decided to work on a show together.

The title, The B'Stard File, had to be changed after it was declined by the Broadcasting Authority. Mayall proposed alternative titles to ITV such as The Member, then The New MEMBER (neither accepted due to perceived explicitness), and then No Minister; he eventually settled on The New Statesman. To research for the series, Mayall visited the House of Commons following the announcement of the 1987 United Kingdom general election.

The series used a live audience at the Yorkshire TV studio in Leeds.

== Cast list ==
- Rik Mayall as Alan B'Stard MP
- Michael Troughton as Piers Fletcher-Dervish MP
- Marsha Fitzalan as Sarah B'Stard
- Rowena Cooper as Norman/Norma Bormann (Series 1; she was credited as "R. R. Cooper" in all but episode six, in order to keep her gender uncertain)
- Charles Gray as Roland Gidleigh-Park (Series 1)
- Vivien Heilbron as Beatrice Protheroe (Series 1)
- Steve Nallon as Mrs Thatcher (Series 1–2)
- John Nettleton as Sir Stephen Baxter (Series 1–2)
- Nick Stringer as Bob Crippen (Series 1–2)
- Berwick Kaler as Geoff Diquead (Series 2)
- Terence Alexander as Sir Greville McDonald (Series 2–4)
- Brigitte Kahn as Frau Kleist MEP, who shares Alan's office for most of Series 4.
- Peter Sallis as Sidney Bliss, (played by John Normington in the special Who Shot...) a former hangman and current publican in Alan's constituency
- John Woodvine as Sir Malachi Jellicoe (Series 1)
- Benjamin Whitrow as Paddy O'Rourke

== Characters ==
=== Alan Beresford B'Stard MP ===
Alan B'Stard is a selfish, greedy, dishonest, lecherous, self-serving and ultra right-wing Thatcherite Conservative backbencher who is MP for the fictional constituency of Haltemprice. Alan was the youngest MP at the age of 31, and was a distillation of the greed and callousness that were considered the hallmarks of new money Thatcherites. He is married to Sarah, a vain, devious nymphomaniac who wanted nothing more than for Alan to die so she could become a rich widow. The couple cheated on each other in perpetuity but remained in a marriage of convenience; Sarah because of Alan's money and Alan because Sarah's father controls the local Tory Party and holds Alan's seat in his gift.

Alan's schemes grow wilder and more bold as the series progresses, taking in bribery, murder and provoking trade union disputes to make a profit. Later, B'Stard would intentionally mismanage the Tory election campaign so Labour would be blamed for an economic crisis, and stage his own assassination to bring back hanging (and make £1 million in the process). In the last episode he creates splits in both the Tory and Labour parties and names himself Lord Protector. Whatever crises and scandals swirled around B'Stard, he always came up smelling of roses. When accused of engaging in sex acts with minors, Alan successfully sues The Times newspaper; when he plots to get his hands on the stolen millions of Robert Maxwell who was hiding in Bosnia, he is hailed as a humanitarian hero. Even when Alan is sentenced to death, he manages to escape the noose and retain his position in Parliament. B'Stard's greatest triumph is when he manages to get himself released from incarceration in a Siberian gulag following his assassination attempt on Soviet president Mikhail Gorbachev and returns to the UK a hero. Having lost his Westminster seat during his forced absence in Russia, Alan manages to procure himself a German seat in the European Union's parliament as well as getting Piers onto the European Commission, with the two of them proceeding to cause more havoc on the continent and further enhance Alan's reputation back home.

B'Stard habitually uses others to aid his quest for money and power. Sidney Bliss, the local pub landlord (and a former hangman), was completely in his power in the hope of regaining his position. Many others–old Nazis, Cabinet ministers and even Salman Rushdie – regularly pay to buy his silence. A running joke throughout the series was that, despite his extreme good looks and how easy it is for him to pursue his constant womanising, B'Stard was very under-endowed and suffered from premature ejaculation. A good quantity of women he bedded are disappointed or contemptuous of his abilities in bed, despite his delusion that they must have enjoyed his sexual company as much as he did theirs. In fact, he thinks that it is a sign of virility that he's able to be so quick in bed.

In the stage show it was revealed that Alan is the architect of New Labour when he realises the Tories were done for (effectively ignoring the last episode of the series), picking a young guitar-playing hippie named Tony Blair and grooming him to be PM. B'Stard transformed Labour into a second Conservative Party, eradicating socialism and effectively running the country from his palatial office at Number 9 Downing Street. The show saw an older Alan, fabulously rich after orchestrating Black Wednesday, still up to his old tricks playing America and Al-Qaeda off each other in the hunt for weapons of mass destruction. By now, Alan is onto his fourth wife (Arabella Lucretia B'Stard), although the show's first run saw Sarah still firmly in place.

=== The Hon. Sir Piers Fletcher-Dervish, Baronet, MP ===
Alan's bumbling fellow MP who helps out with his schemes, which at times Piers complicates or outright foils with his naivety. Alan frequently bullies Piers into following his commands and exploits his childlike personality for his own gain. Piers remains loyal to Alan despite the abuse the latter subjects him to. Any attempts at refusing or rebelling against him tend to end painfully. Instances of abuse include Alan tying Piers' beloved childhood teddy bear to a chair and setting it on fire during a psychotic episode after Piers was promoted to junior ministerial position, and Alan threatening to kill Piers's new-born son Gervais to force him into vacating his seat in order to get Sir Greville back into parliament. Piers owes his position largely to nepotism, with his safe Conservative seat "south of Watford" having been held by members of the Fletcher-Dervish family for generations.

=== Sarah B'Stard ===
Alan's materialistic wife who almost equals her husband in his capacity for cruelty and sexual deviancy. Despite coming from a wealthy background herself, she married Alan for his money and to further her social status (despite her claims that she can trace her ancestry back to Edward II), being far more invested in her hedonistic desires than his welfare, which she willingly compromises numerous times throughout the series. Throughout the series she has affairs with Alan's election and political agent Beatrice Protheroe, Cabinet minister Sir Greville McDonald, and Piers Fletcher-Dervish. Due to Alan holding the Haltemprice constituency in gift from his father-in-law, any attempts by Sarah to become independently wealthy, such as inheriting shares in Ocelot Motors from her late uncle or writing a tell-all memoir exposing Alan's corruption and scandalous behaviour, are foiled by Alan, often through criminal means.

=== Sir Greville McDonald ===
Sir Greville is introduced in the final episode of series 2, portrayed as a corrupt cabinet minister who recruited an unwitting Piers as junior Minister for Housing in order to 'nod through' the provision of heritage site subsidies for some of his various property investments. Sir Greville had his first dealings with B'Stard in this episode who implied he would expose him unless he agreed a similar arrangement for B'Stard, and thus became a suspect for the audience in Alan's shooting at the episode's climax. By the time of Alan's 'miraculous recovery', Sir Greville had been promoted by Thatcher to Minister for Law and Order and negotiated with Alan for the return of the gallows (earning himself a finder's fee of £50,000). Sir Greville found it particularly amusing when B'Stard was sentenced to death and in fact spent the night of Alan's planned execution with the condemned man's wife.

By series 3, Greville is Secretary of State for the Environment and has developed a love-hate relationship with B'Stard which eventually evolves into a mutual respect. Series 4 found Greville out of Parliament after the 1992 election when local voters disagreed with his decision to place a nuclear waste plant in the middle of his own constituency. After some persuasion from B'Stard, Greville takes over Piers' seat and becomes Secretary of State for European Affairs, thus ensuring a wealth of opportunities to connive with Alan in Europe. The last episode saw Greville split with Alan and become part of The Progressive Federalists who were soundly thrashed by Alan's New Patriotic Party at the polls.

=== Sir Stephen Baxter ===
An elderly backbench Conservative MP who shares the office with Alan and Piers during the first two series. Sir Stephen's morally uptight old-school attitude and respect for parliamentary protocol meant that he contrasts sharply with the self-centred Alan and the clueless Piers, serving as further comic foil to bounce the two of them off. Despite being in parliament for a very long time he has been consigned to the back benches for many years after taking the fall in a scandal involving another minister who would go on to become Secretary of State for Wales. Alan has little respect for him and is more than willing to exploit Sir Stephen's helpful and professional nature for his own ends, including plagiarising one of Sir Stephen's speeches in the Commons in order to ensure that Alan's Private Member's Bill on arming the police would pass into law. He is last seen in Series 2 when, having already been alienated by the introduction of TV cameras and film crews into the House of Commons, Sir Stephen witnesses Piers inflating a blow-up Alan B'Stard doll in a suggestive manner. Sir Stephen gives Piers a stern telling-off before declaring that he "might as well accept that peerage" and then leaves the office, suggesting that he moved up to the House of Lords.

=== Roland Gidleigh-Park ===
Roland is Sarah's xenophobic father and leader of the local Conservatives. His power means that B'Stard must maintain his favour to keep his seat. Unlike B'Stard, he cares for the Haltemprice constituency.

=== Norma Bormann ===
Norma is Alan's accountant and personal confidante. After being forced into hiding by being pursued by the authorities, Norma handles this problem through undergoing a sex-change, and throughout the first series, the effects of this happen rapidly.

=== Sidney Bliss ===
Sidney is an elderly, neurotic publican in Alan's Yorkshire constituency, doubling as an infrequent assistant. As a former hangman with an obsessive love for the method of execution, he asks Alan for the chance to get his old career back.

In the special Who Shot..., he managed to regain his old position when the death penalty was re-introduced. After Alan's unsuccessful and half-hearted lobbying of Sir Greville McDonald for Sidney's reinstatement as a hangman, Sidney blackmailed Sir Greville into reinstating him, threatening to tell the newspapers that he carried out the secret execution of Lord Lucan in 1974, ten years after the abolition of the death penalty in 1964. Sidney likely lost his position as hangman, as well as his chance to 'tour' South Africa and South America, after Alan survived his execution due to the gallows' construction from balsa wood.

=== Bob Crippen ===
Bob Crippen is the self-righteous but short-tempered Labour MP who represents the deprived inner city constituency of Bramall, and, like B'Stard, has a large majority. Crippen is B'Stard's first established rival in the series. His political career followed time spent working in the car manufacturing industry and as a trade union representative.

=== Beatrice Protheroe ===
Beatrice Protheroe is Alan's election agent during the 1987 general election, subsequently becoming his political agent when he became an MP. She was having an affair with Sarah, Alan's wife and an old school friend. She appeared only in the first series.

=== Paddy O'Rourke ===
Paddy O'Rourke is a senior member of the Labour Party and an Opposition frontbencher, appearing in the third and fourth series. Having a public reputation as a firebrand, he affects an Irish accent in public to maintain support amongst Labour's regional voters (claiming that all Labour leaders did this, with Harold Wilson being from Basingstoke and Ramsay Macdonald being French).

When Alan's reputation as the most right-wing MP is threatened by the newly elected Victor Crosby, he secretly meets with O'Rourke to conspire to leak secret Conservative documents and to join the Labour Party; after being blackmailed by Alan, O'Rourke rearranges Shadow Cabinet positions so that Alan would be appointed Foreign Secretary under the next Labour Government. When the Conservatives endeavour to engineer their defeat at the next general election to avoid dealing with the fallout of a pending oil crisis, O'Rourke conspires with Alan to propose a generous but uncosted manifesto to prevent Labour from winning (albeit being used as a pawn by Alan to short shares in oil companies and become richer).

When a snap general election is called focusing on UK membership of the European Economic Community, O'Rourke becomes the deputy leader of Alan's Eurosceptic New Patriotic Party after Piers is made to issue an EEC directive banning trade unions to prevent Labour from winning over a split Conservative Party. When the NPP wins the general election after the filming of a Falklands War-themed pornographic film on Sark (bankrolled by Alan) is mistaken for a French invasion, O'Rourke proclaims that he will be the next Prime Minister, arguing that Alan is ineligible as he did not hold a parliamentary seat after deciding not to contest one; when Alan proposes that he could lead the new government as Lord Protector instead, O'Rourke is summarily arrested for challenging him.

== Release and distribution ==
In the United States, the first fourteen episodes were distributed by WNYC starting on May 15, 1990. In January 1994, BFS Video released the first six episodes as a three-video cassette set.

=== Adaptations ===
In April 2006, the series was adapted into a stage play. It follows B'Stard, who has defected to Labour and is close to Tony Blair, attempting to find Iraq's weapons of mass destruction, which are located in the headquarters of the BBC. It was followed in 2007 by a slightly altered version, since Gordon Brown was the Prime Minister instead. Due to Mayall being sick, Mike Sherman played B'Stard.

In March 2017, Laurence and Gran announced their interest to develop a sequel, titled The B'Stard Legacy. It would have followed his son Arron, adopted by two Green Party activists in Welwyn Garden City, who is behind an internet media empire and is involved in several political crises. Although it was initially pitched to ITV, they declined to air the series, fearing it would have flopped. The sequel was scrapped by 2016.

== Reception ==
=== Critical response and legacy ===
The series received relatively favourable reviews. Bob Shields of The Evening Times was more critical, saying that "once you got used to seeing Rik Mayall in a pin-striped suit, and realized that he wasn't going to give his customary V sign, it quickly dawned that this comedy was no better than your average student revue". Marvin Kitman, in his column in Newsday praised the show, calling it "The most promising satirical comedy since 'Hot Metal'" as well as noting that compared to Yes Minister, The New Statesman "is the sabre slashing of young cavalry officers, chopping heads off where the light touch would do". The Edgware Advertiser called it "provocative" and a "biting satire". The Washington Post praised it as "no less than a masterpiece of political satire", commending Mayall's acting and calling the series "outlandishly funny". Gavin Heynes of The Guardian called it an "unhinged sitcom [that] centred on the scheming of B’Stard [sic] a shameless, shagaholic money-grubber".

The New Statesman won two awards, the International Emmy Award for Best Popular Arts Programming in 1988, as well as the BAFTA TV Award for Best Comedy Entertainment Programme in 1991. The series was featured in the reference book 1001 TV Shows You Must Watch Before You Die, published in 2015.

The death of Rik Mayall on June 9, 2014, prompted the producers to kill off B'Stard by writing a fictional obituary for him (with B'Stard's date of death the same as Mayall's). The obituary stated that B'Stard died while having sex with his two Polynesian masseuses and states that he went on to marry five women, with Lady Gaga being his fifth wife, and left behind five children and twelve grandchildren. It also revealed that his birth date is February 29 and that he was responsible for the political career of Tony Blair, the creation of New Labour, as well as the Iraq War.

== See also ==
- Yes Minister
- The Thick of It
- In the Loop
- List of fictional prime ministers of the United Kingdom
- James Anderton
