= Brigitte Kahn =

German-born British actress

Brigitte Kahn is a German-born British actress who has appeared on several television shows in the UK.

She had a part in the Star Wars film The Empire Strikes Back, where she plays an originally unnamed rebel officer who was later named Toryn Farr in other Star Wars media, as one of four female characters with a speaking part in the original Star Wars trilogy.

Kahn played Dagmar in Auf Wiedersehen, Pet. Other TV credits include: Secret Army, The Sandbaggers, The Gentle Touch, The Professionals, C.A.T.S. Eyes, Taggart, The Bill and The New Statesman.

She appeared as the German Baroness in the film The Remains of the Day.

In 1989, Kahn played Hippolyta in the Royal Shakespeare Company's 1989 production A Midsummer Night's Dream.
