= Laurence Marks (British writer) =

British screenwriter (born 1948)

- Born: 8 December 1948 (age 77); London, England
- Occupation: Scriptwriter
- Spouse: Brigitte Kahn
- Writing career
- Period: 1979–present
- Genre: Television
- Notable works: Holding the Fort (1980–82); Shine on Harvey Moon (1982–85, 1995); Roll Over Beethoven (1985); The New Statesman (1987–92); Birds of a Feather (1989–98, 2014–2020); Love Hurts (1992–94); Get Back (1992–93); Goodnight Sweetheart (1993–99, 2016); Unfinished Business (1998–99); Believe Nothing (2002); Mumbai Calling (2007)

Laurence Marks (born 8 December 1948) is a British screenwriter and one half of writing duo Marks and Gran (with Maurice Gran).

== Biography ==
Born to a Jewish family, Marks attended Holloway Comprehensive School (formerly Holloway County Grammar School until 1955).

Marks became a reporter for a local weekly paper, the Tottenham Weekly Herald. In 1975, he was working as a freelance journalist when he was asked to report from the scene of the Moorgate tube crash. He only discovered later that his father, Bernard Marks, was one of 43 victims of the accident.

Soon after, Marks joined The Sunday Times' Insight investigative journalism team, and reported in depth on the investigation into the crash. In 2006, Marks made a documentary for Channel 4, Me, My Dad and Moorgate, in which he rejected the verdict of accidental death by the coroner's jury, and advocated his theory that the driver of the train had committed suicide by crashing the train.

Marks also worked as writer/researcher for Thames Television's current affairs programme, This Week. Following a chance encounter with comedy writer Barry Took, he and childhood friend Maurice Gran got an opportunity to write a radio show for comedian Frankie Howerd, which led to their becoming full-time comedy writers.

Marks subsequently wrote with Gran the TV comedy-drama Shine on Harvey Moon (1982–85, 1995) and the popular sitcoms The New Statesman (1987–92), Birds of a Feather (1989–98, 2014–2020) and Goodnight Sweetheart (1993–99, 2016). They are also the authors of Prudence at Number 10, a fictional diary written as though by a P.A. of prime minister Gordon Brown. Their theatre works include Dreamboats and Petticoats, Von Ribbentrop’s Watch, Love Me Do, Playing God, Save the Last Dance for Me, and Dreamboats and Miniskirts.

Marks is an Arsenal fan and wrote the book A Fan for All Seasons (1999), a diary of his life as a writer and an Arsenal supporter. He is a member of the Labour Party.

== Writing credits ==
Production	Notes	Broadcaster
The Marti Caine Show	5 episodes (1980)	BBC2
Roots	6 episodes (co-written with Maurice Gran, 1981)	ITV
Holding the Fort	20 episodes (co-written with Maurice Gran, 1980–1982)	ITV
Shine on Harvey Moon	25 episodes (1982, 1984–1985, 1995)	ITV
Roll Over Beethoven	12 episodes (1985)	ITV
Relative Strangers	3 episodes (co-written with Maurice Gran, 1985–1987)	Channel 4
The Bretts	3 episodes (co-written with Maurice Gran, 1987)	ITV
Alan B'Stard Closes Down the BBC	Comic Relief special (co-written with Maurice Gran, 1988)	BBC1
Young, Gifted and Broke	7 episodes (co-written with Maurice Gran, 1989)	ITV
Snakes and Ladders	7 episodes (co-written with Maurice Gran, 1989)	Channel 4
Birds of a Feather	102 episodes (co-written with Maurice Gran, 1989–1994, 1996–1998)	BBC1
Bullseye!	Feature film (co-written with Leslie Bricusse, Maurice Gran, Nick Mead and Michael Winner, 1990)	N/A
So You Think You've Got Troubles	6 episodes (co-written with Maurice Gran, 1991)	BBC1
Screen One	"Wall of Silence" (co-written with Maurice Gran, 1993)	BBC1
Get Back	10 episodes (co-written with Maurice Gran, 1992–1993)	BBC1
Love Hurts	30 episodes (co-written with Maurice Gran, 1992–1994)	BBC1
The New Statesman	29 episodes (co-written with Maurice Gran, 1987–1992)	ITV; BBC1
A. B'Stard Exposed	Television film (co-written with Maurice Gran, 1994)	BBC1
Goodnight Sweetheart	59 episodes (co-written with Maurice Gran, 1993–1999, 2016)	BBC1
Mosley	4 episodes (co-written with Maurice Gran and Nicholas Mosley, 1998)	Channel 4
Unfinished Business	12 episodes (co-written with Maurice Gran, 1998–1999)	BBC One
Starting Out	8 episodes (co-written with Maurice Gran, 1999)	BBC One
Believe Nothing	6 episodes (co-written with Maurice Gran, 2002)	ITV
The Last Laugh	"Pilot" (co-written with Maurice Gran, 2005)	BBC Three
Mumbai Calling	"Pilot" (co-written with Maurice Gran and Sanjeev Bhaskar, 2007)	ITV
Birds of a Feather	8 episodes (2014–2020): "Gimme Shelter" (co-written with Maurice Gran, 2014); "Hot Stuff" (co-written with Maurice Gran, 2014); "Tattoo You" (co-written with Maurice Gran, 2014); "Back to Zero" (co-written with Maurice Gran, 2014); "Text Santa Special" (co-written with Maurice Gran, 2014); "Birds on a Plane" (co-written with Maurice Gran, 2014); "Guess Who's Coming to Essex?" (co-written with Maurice Gran, 2015); "The Chief, The Cook, His Mum and Her Lodger" (co-written with Maurice Gran, 2015)	ITV

== Awards and nominations ==
Year	Award	Work	Category	Result	Reference
1990	British Academy Television Awards	The New Statesman	Best Comedy Series (with Tony Charles, Geoffrey Sax and Maurice Gran)	Nominated	
1991	British Academy Television Awards	The New Statesman	Best Comedy Series (with Tony Charles, Geoffrey Sax and Maurice Gran)	Won	
