= Maurice Gran =

English screenwriter (born 1949)

- Born: Maurice Bernard Gran; 26 October 1949 (age 77); London, England
- Occupation: Scriptwriter
- Writing career
- Period: 1979–present
- Genre: Television
- Notable works: Holding the Fort (1980–82); Shine on Harvey Moon (1982–85, 1995); Roll Over Beethoven (1985); The New Statesman (1987–92); Birds of a Feather (1989–98, 2014–20); Love Hurts (1992–94); Get Back (1992–93); Goodnight Sweetheart (1993–99, 2016); Unfinished Business (1998–99); Believe Nothing (2002); Mumbai Calling (2007)

Maurice Bernard Gran (born 26 October 1949) is an English writer and one half of the scriptwriting duo Marks and Gran. He co-wrote the sitcoms The New Statesman, Birds of a Feather and Goodnight Sweetheart with Laurence Marks. Their theatre works include Dreamboats and Petticoats, Save the Last Dance for Me and Dreamboats and Miniskirts.

== Biography ==
Born to a Jewish family, Gran lived in Finsbury Park Road (in the area of the same name) as a child, and his father was the manager of a fabric shop in Soho. He attended William Ellis School, a grammar school for boys in Highgate. He then rose to be the manager of the Jobcentre Plus in Tottenham, whilst writing scripts with Laurence Marks which they submitted to the BBC.

The duo had begun writing together after they met at a discussion group for writers that was held within the British Drama League. They were given the opportunity to write a radio show for Frankie Howerd after a chance meeting with Barry Took. Gran is also the co-author of Prudence at Number 10, a satirical diary supposedly written by Gordon Brown's P.A.

== Writing credits ==
Production	Notes	Broadcaster
The Marti Caine Show	5 episodes (1980)	BBC2
Roots	6 episodes (co-written with Laurence Marks, 1981)	ITV
Holding the Fort	20 episodes (co-written with Laurence Marks, 1980–1982)	ITV
Shine on Harvey Moon	25 episodes (1982, 1984–1985, 1995)	ITV
Roll Over Beethoven	12 episodes (1985)	ITV
Relative Strangers	3 episodes (co-written with Laurence Marks, 1985–1987)	Channel 4
The Bretts	3 episodes (co-written with Laurence Marks, 1987)	ITV
Alan B'Stard Closes Down the BBC	Comic Relief special (co-written with Laurence Marks, 1988)	BBC1
Young, Gifted and Broke	7 episodes (co-written with Laurence Marks, 1989)	ITV
Snakes and Ladders	7 episodes (co-written with Laurence Marks, 1989)	Channel 4
Birds of a Feather	129 episodes (co-written with Laurence Marks, 1989–1994, 1996–1998, 2014–2017, 2020)	BBC1/ITV
Bullseye!	Feature film (co-written with Leslie Bricusse, Laurence Marks, Nick Mead and Michael Winner, 1990)	N/A
So You Think You've Got Troubles	6 episodes (co-written with Laurence Marks, 1991)	BBC1
Screen One	"Wall of Silence" (co-written with Laurence Marks, 1993)	BBC1
Get Back	10 episodes (co-written with Laurence Marks, 1992–1993)	BBC1
Love Hurts	30 episodes (co-written with Laurence Marks, 1992–1994)	BBC1
The New Statesman	29 episodes (co-written with Laurence Marks, 1987–1992)	ITV; BBC1
A. B'Stard Exposed	Television film (co-written with Laurence Marks, 1994)	BBC1
Goodnight Sweetheart	59 episodes (co-written with Laurence Marks, 1993–1999, 2016)	BBC1
Mosley	4 episodes (co-written with Laurence Marks and Nicholas Mosley, 1998)	Channel 4
Unfinished Business	12 episodes (co-written with Laurence Marks, 1998–1999)	BBC One
Starting Out	8 episodes (co-written with Laurence Marks, 1999)	BBC One
Believe Nothing	6 episodes (co-written with Laurence Marks, 2002)	ITV
The Last Laugh	"Pilot" (co-written with Laurence Marks, 2005)	BBC Three
Mumbai Calling	"Pilot" (co-written with Laurence Marks and Sanjeev Bhaskar, 2007)	ITV

== Awards and nominations ==
Year	Award	Work	Category	Result	Reference
1990	British Academy Television Awards	The New Statesman	Best Comedy Series (with Tony Charles, Geoffrey Sax and Laurence Marks)	Nominated	
1991	British Academy Television Awards	The New Statesman	Best Comedy Series (with Tony Charles, Geoffrey Sax and Laurence Marks)	Won	
