= Simon Nash =

English former actor (born 1972)

- Born: Simon John Nash; 1972 (age 53–54)
- Occupation: Actor
- Years active: 1980–1998
- Television: Nobody's Perfect (1980–1982); Tugs (1989); Birds of a Feather (1989); Kappatoo (1990–1992)

Simon John Nash is an English former actor. With a career that spanned 18 years, he is best known for appearing in Nobody's Perfect (1980–1982), Tugs (1989) and Kappatoo (1990–1992).

Nash was the first actor to portray Garth Stubbs in the BBC One sitcom Birds of a Feather (1989).

== Career ==
Nash made his television debut as a child actor at the age of eight, with the role of Sammy in the ITV comedy series Nobody's Perfect, an adaptation of the 1970s American series Maude. He made his debut appearance in the fourth episode during the first series, "Doctor Doctor", which was broadcast on 19 October 1980. He also appeared in the fifth episode from the first series. He appeared in five episodes from the second series, making his final appearance in the seventh episode, "Bill's Musical", which was broadcast on 12 September 1982.

Nash portrayed Tom in two episodes from the first series of the BBC One period drama series Nanny. His first appearance, in the seventh episode, "Waifs and Strays", was broadcast on 21 February 1981. His second, and final, appearance, in the eighth episode, "A Birdless Cage", was broadcast on 28 February 1981.

Nash made his film debut with the role of Tony Phillips in the science fiction horror film Xtro, written and directed by Harry Bromley Davenport. The film was released on 6 December 1982.

Nash portrayed Thomas in the first three episodes from the third series of Middle English. The first episode, "A Game of Soldiers", was broadcast on 28 September 1983. The second episode, "A Game of Soldiers: Part 2", was broadcast on 5 October 1983. The third episode, "A Game of Soldiers: Part 3", was broadcast on 12 October 1983.

Nash portrayed David in the adventure family film Breakout. The film was released on 27 November 1984.

Nash portrayed Boy Buttle in Brazil, directed by Terry Gilliam. The film was released on 22 February 1985.

Nash portrayed Terry, a child who gets mistaken for a shoplifter, in the third episode during the first series of the ITV sitcom Slinger's Day, the only sitcom to star television host Bruce Forsyth. The episode, "Butter Wouldn't Melt", was broadcast on 17 September 1986.

Nash portrayed Sean Stebbings in the third episode from the first series of the Channel 4 anthology series Tickets for the Titanic. The episode, "Checkpoint Chiswick", was broadcast on 18 March 1987.

Nash voiced Ten Cents in the ITV (CITV) series Tugs, which ran from 4 April 1989 to 27 June 1989.

Nash became known as the first actor to portray the role of Garth Stubbs—the son of Tracey Stubbs (Linda Robson) and Darryl (Alun Lewis), and the nephew of Sharon Theodopolopodous (Pauline Quirke)—in the BBC One sitcom Birds of a Feather. He made his debut, and only, appearance, in a guest capacity, in the second episode of the first series, "Just Visiting", which was broadcast on 23 October 1989. The character was later recast to Matthew Savage, who went on to play the role until the end of the original series.

Nash portrayed Simon Cashmere/Kappatoo in the ITV (CITV) comedy drama series Kappatoo, which ran from 23 May 1990 to 21 May 1992.

Nash portrayed Simon Cotterell in the sixty-fifth episode during the ninth series of the ITV police procedural series The Bill. The episode, "Cry Baby", was broadcast on 3 June 1993. He portrayed Male Youth in the second episode during the first series, "No Cappuccino", of Every Single Lining, which was also broadcast on 3 June 1993.

Nash made his final appearance as an actor with the role of Police Constable in the BBC One television film Big Cat. The film was broadcast on 6 September 1998. He retired shortly after.

== Filmography ==
=== Television ===
Year	Title	Role	Notes	Ref.
1980–1982	Nobody's Perfect	Sammy	7 episodes	
1981	Nanny	Tom	2 episodes	
1983	Middle English	Thomas	3 episodes	
1986	Slinger's Day	Terry	Episode: "Butter Wouldn't Melt"	
1987	Tickets for the Titanic	Sean Stebbings	Episode: "Checkpoint Chiswick"	
1989	Tugs	Ten Cents (voice)	13 episodes	
1989	Birds of a Feather	Garth Stubbs	Episode: "Just Visiting"	
1990–1992	Kappatoo	Simon Cashmere, Kappatoo	14 episodes	
1993	The Bill	Stuart Cotterell	Episode: "Cry Baby"	
1993	Every Silver Lining	Male Youth	Episode: "No Cappuccino"	
1998	Big Cat	Police Constable	Television film	

=== Film ===
Year	Title	Role	Notes	Ref.
1982	Xtro	Tony Phillips		
1984	Breakout	David		
1985	Brazil	Boy Buttle		

=== Radio ===
Year	Title	Role	Station	Notes	Ref.
1985–1987	King Street Junior	Robert, Child	BBC Radio 4	3 episodes	
