= David Starzyk =

American actor

- Born: Springfield, Massachusetts, U.S.
- Occupation: Actor
- Years active: 1993–present
- Spouse: Kimberley Ann Fitzgerald (m. 1991)
- Children: 2

David Starzyk is an American actor. He is best known for his recurring role as Richard Casablancas Sr. in Veronica Mars.

== Career ==
Starzyk has guest-starred in a number of notable television series, including Home Improvement, Felicity, Sabrina the Teenage Witch, Pacific Blue, NYPD Blue, Days of Our Lives, The Young and the Restless, Charmed, Two and a Half Men, Criminal Minds, What I Like About You, Bones, The Practice, Boston Legal, Lost, Desperate Housewives, Veronica Mars, Victorious, 90210 Person of Interest and among other series. In 2010, he had a recurring role as Officer Pete, boyfriend to Valerie Bertinelli's character, Melanie Moretti on TV Land's original sitcom Hot in Cleveland.

Starzyk has also appeared in a series of successful and memorable Chase Sapphire television commercials as well as in the feature films To Save a Life and Bring It On: Fight to the Finish, both of which were released in 2009. He also starred in the movie Haunted Echoes launched in 2008, alongside Sean Young, M. Emmet Walsh and Juliet Landau.

== Personal life ==
Starzyk was born in Massachusetts to Helen (née Szala) and Theodore Starzyk. He is married to actress Kimberley Ann Fitzgerald and he has two sons, Liam and Finn.

== Filmography ==
=== Film ===
| Year | Title | Role | Notes |
|---|---|---|---|
| 1993 | Madame | Ron | |
| 1995 | Huntress: Spirit of the Night | Alek Devane | |
| 1996 | Decaf | Garrett Beck, DDS | |
| 1998 | Free Enterprise | Brian | |
| 1999 | Zig Zag | Unknown role | |
| 2000 | Metropolis | Unknown role | TV movie |
| 2004 | A Boyfriend for Christmas | Ian | TV movie |
| 2005 | Erosion | Jim Lernard | |
| 2006 | The Virgin of Juarez | Norman | |
| 2007 | Sacrifices of the Heart | Adam Leventhall | TV movie |
| 2008 | Haunted Echoes | Guy Dykstra | Direct-to-Video |
| 2009 | MW | Unknown role | |
| 2009 | Bring It On: Fight to the Finish | Henry | Direct-to-Video |
| 2009 | To Save a Life | Glen Taylor | |
| 2009 | Frozen Kiss | Larry | |
| 2012 | Janeane from Des Moines | Tea Party Patriot | |
| 2014 | Taken Away | Richard Martin | TV movie |
| 2014 | The Haircut | Ron | Short film |
| 2015 | The Perfect Guy | Frank | |
| 2015 | 16 and Missing | Daniel | TV movie |
| 2015 | Endings, Inc. | Mr. Greene | Short film |
| 2016 | Nightmare Nurse | Detective Thames | |
| 2016 | Double Mommy | Roy | TV movie |
| 2017 | Sharing Christmas | Dan | TV movie |
| 2017 | Perfect Citizen | Marty Isserles | TV movie |
| 2018 | My Christmas Inn | David | TV movie |
| 2019 | Eddie's | Robert Barron | TV movie |
| 2019 | A Daughter's Deception | Arthur Bishop | TV movie |
| 2019 | Don't Say No | Christie's Father | |

=== Television ===
| Year | Title | Role | Notes |
|---|---|---|---|
| 1995 | University Hospital | Patrick | Episode: "Shadow of a Doubt" |
| 1995 | The Crew | Unknown role | Episode: "The Operation" |
| 1995 | New York Daze | Applicant #1 | Episode: "Pretend You Know Me" |
| 1995 | Sister, Sister | Mountie | Episode: "Halloween" |
| 1995 | Dweebs | Ben Reynolds | Recurring role (3 episodes) |
| 1996 | The Nanny | Steve Goodman | Episode: "Ship of Fran's |
| 1997 | Beyond Belief: Fact or Fiction | Kris Kemplar | Episode: "Love Over the Counter" |
| 1997 | Chicago Sons | Dan Forester | Episode: "Beauty and the Butt" |
| 1997 | L.A. Firefighters | Brad | Episode: "The Big One" |
| 1997 | Smart Guy | Mr. Hamilton | Episode: "T.J. versus the Machine" |
| 1998 | Home Improvement | Detective MacIntrye | Episode: "Bewitched" |
| 1999 | Acapulco H.E.A.T. | Van | Episode: "Code Name: Hot Chains" |
| 1999 | Love Boat: The Next Wave | Richard Petersen | Episode: "Prom Queen" |
| 1999 | Felicity | Mr. Charlie Sherwood | Recurring role (2 episodes) |
| 1999–2000 | Pacific Blue | William Blake | Recurring role (7 episodes) |
| 1999–2000 | Veronica's Closet | Pete | Recurring role (5 episodes) |
| 2000 | Son of the Beach | Joseph Anthony Gonzinia | Episode: "Two Thongs Don't Make a Right" |
| 2000 | The Third Coast | Unknown role | Episode: "Pilot" |
| 2000–01 | Sabrina, the Teenage Witch | Professor Arthur Carlin | Recurring role (2 episodes) |
| 2000–03 | The Practice | EPA Attorney John Myers / Martin Adler | Recurring role (4 episodes) |
| 2001 | Grosse Pointe | Ken | Episode: "The End of the Affair" |
| 2001 | V.I.P. | Dr. Ted McClellan, DDS | Episode: "Molar Ice Cap" |
| 2001 | Special Unit 2 | Dr. Loceff | Episode: "The Waste" |
| 2001 | NYPD Blue | Special Agent Boyd | Recurring role (2 episodes) |
| 2001–03 | Days of Our Lives | ER Doctor / Dr. Wade | Recurring role (5 episodes) |
| 2002 | Any Day Now | Mr. Gibbons | Episode: "The Real Thing" |
| 2002 | My Adventures in Television | Marty | Recurring role (2 episodes) |
| 2003 | Mister Sterling | Anthony Marino | Recurring role (6 episodes) |
| 2003 | The Lyon's Den | Unknown role | Episode: "Ex" |
| 2003 | CSI: Crime Scene Investigation | Fred Stearns | Episode: "Got Murder?" |
| 2004 | The D.A. | Robert Sachs | Episode: "The People vs. Achmed Abbas" |
| 2004 | Joan of Arcadia | Robert Higgins | Episode: "Anonymous" |
| 2004 | Reba | Paul | Episode: "The Two-Girl Theory" |
| 2004 | LAX | Vince | Episode: "Thanksgiving" |
| 2004–05 | Boston Legal | Attorney Daniel Gellman | Recurring role (2 episodes) |
| 2005 | Lost | Brian Porter | Episode: "Special" |
| 2005 | Two and a Half Men | Eric | Episode: "It Was Mame, Mom" |
| 2005 | Blind Justice | Ty Largent | Episode: "Past Imperfect" |
| 2005 | What I Like About You | Paul | Episode: "The Kid, the Cake, and the Chemistry" |
| 2005 | Close to Home | Thom | Episode: "Pilot" |
| 2005 | CSI: NY | Charles Holden | Episode: "Jamalot" |
| 2005 | Bones | Ken Wright | Episode: "The Man on Death Row" |
| 2005–06 | 7th Heaven | Rose's Dad | Recurring role (3 episodes) |
| 2005–06 | Just Legal | Allan Marshall | Recurring role (2 episodes) |
| 2005–19 | Veronica Mars | Richard Casablancas | Recurring role (9 episodes) |
| 2006 | Charmed | Carl Jenkins | Recurring role (2 episodes) |
| 2006 | Windfall | Mr. Evett | Episode: "Changing Partners" |
| 2006 | Entourage | Gene | Episode: "Sorry, Ari" |
| 2006–11 | CSI: Miami | Prosecuting Attorney / Nicholas Chandler | Recurring role (3 episodes) |
| 2007 | NCIS | Allen J. Carter | Episode: "Sharif Returns" |
| 2007 | Standoff | Howard Finch | Episode: "Severance" |
| 2007 | Side Order of Life | Matthew Graham | Episode: "Coming Out" |
| 2007 | Without a Trace | Will Rogan | Episode: "Res Ipsa" |
| 2007–08 | The Young and the Restless | Dr. Paul Webb | Recurring role (11 episodes) |
| 2008 | Unhitched | Evan | Episode: "Conjoined Twins Pitch No-Hitter" |
| 2008 | iCarly | Brad | Episode: "iCarly Saves TV" |
| 2009 | Cold Case | Mort Ackerson '88 | Episode: "Breaking News" |
| 2009 | CSI: Crime Scene Investigation | Congressman Griffin | Episode: "Miscarriage of Justice" |
| 2009 | Meteor | Colonel Beck | Miniseries (2 episodes) |
| 2009 | Prison Break | Blue Phillips | Episode: "The Old Ball and Chain" |
| 2009–12 | Desperate Housewives | Bradley Scott | Recurring role (4 episodes) |
| 2010 | 90210 | Athur | Episode: "Meet the Parent" |
| 2010 | Castle | Lee Copley | Episode: "A Deadly Game" |
| 2010 | Three Rivers | Dr. Guerreri | Episode: "Case Histories" |
| 2010–11 | Hot in Cleveland | Pete | Recurring role (5 episodes) |
| 2010–12 | Victorious | Principal Eikner | Recurring role (3 episodes) |
| 2011 | The Protector | Alex O'Dell | Episode: "Class" |
| 2011 | Rizzoli & Isles | Phil Young | Episode: "Don't Hate the Player" |
| 2011 | Criminal Minds | Matt Bradstone | Episode: "Proof" |
| 2012 | The Client List | Jared Dawson | Episode: "The Rub of Sugarland" |
| 2012 | Melissa & Joey | Mort Haber | Episode: "Good to Go" |
| 2012 | Blackout | Dr. Lyle Hendricks | Episode: "Part 1" |
| 2012 | Major Crimes | Dr. Ralph Tolson | Episode: "Medical Causes" |
| 2013 | Last Resort | Jack Tyne | Episode: "Damn the Torpedoes" |
| 2013 | Mad Men | Bob Grange | Recurring role (2 episodes) |
| 2013 | You've Probably Dated My Mom! | George | Episode: "All Tied Up" |
| 2013 | The Mentalist | Ed Reed | Episode: "The Red Tattoo" |
| 2014 | Bones | Jake Winters | Episode: "The Carrot in the Kudzu" |
| 2014 | Revenge | Conrad's Lawyer | Episode: "Execution" |
| 2014 | The Bold and the Beautiful | Doctor | Episode: "#1.6857" |
| 2014 | Masters of Sex | Jim Pearson | Episode: "Mirror, Mirror" |
| 2014 | Person of Interest | David | Episode: "Nautilus" |
| 2014 | Happyland | Unknown role | Miniseries; Episode: "Disorderly Conduct" |
| 2014 | The Mysteries of Laura | Jason Harvell | Episode: "The Mystery of the Fertility Fatality" |
| 2015 | Blue Bloods | Evan Beck | Episode: "Home Sweet Home" |
| 2015 | Girl Meets World | Ron Macavoy | Episode: "Girl Meets Demolition" |
| 2015 | Cam Girls | Unknown role | Recurring role (4 episodes) |
| 2015 | iZombie | Terrence Fowler | Episode: "Real Dead Housewife of Seattle" |
| 2016 | NCIS: New Orleans | Brad Curry | Episode: "Father's Day" |
| 2016 | Hit the Floor | Elliott West | Recurring role (2 episodes) |
| 2017 | Grimm | Judge Stancroft | Recurring role (2 episodes) |
| 2017 | Switched at Birth | Dean Richard Petersen | Episode: "Occupy Truth" |
| 2018 | S.W.A.T. | Phil Granger | Episode: "Payback" |
| 2018 | Code Black | Dave | Episode: "Third Year" |
| 2019 | The Affair | Ron | Episode: "#5.2" |

=== Web series ===
| Year | Title | Role | Notes |
|---|---|---|---|
| 2015 | Guidance | Frank Worth | Episode: "The Power of Persuasion" |
