= Reflections on a Crime =

- Directed by: Jon Purdy
- Written by: Jon Purdy
- Produced by: Alida Camp, Gwen Field, Barbara Klein, Carol Dunn Trussell
- Starring: Mimi Rogers; Billy Zane; John Terry
- Cinematography: Teresa Medina
- Edited by: Norman Buckley
- Music by: Parmer Fuller
- Release date: 1994
- Running time: 96 minutes
- Country: United States
- Language: English

Reflections on a Crime (also known as Reflections in the Dark) is a 1994 American prison thriller written and directed by Jon Purdy. Mimi Rogers stars as a woman in the final hours of Death Row retelling the murder of her husband that she was incarcerated for.

== Plot ==
Regina, a death row prisoner, raises questions about her guilt when she recalls the murder of her husband, James, through a series of confessions and flashbacks. Colin, a prison guard, with a media interest, is intrigued by the beautiful Regina and her story. Colin questions Regina about her late husband's murder and receives conflicting answers, raising questions over the cause of James' death and whether or not Regina had intended to kill him. It also becomes clear to Colin that, during James and Regina's marriage, the former became possessive and abusive, struggling to deal with an earlier relationship of Regina's that she could not forget.

== Cast ==
- Mimi Rogers as Regina
- Billy Zane as Colin
- John Terry as James
- Kurt Fuller as Howard
- Lee Garlington as Tina
- Nancy Fish as Ellen
- Frank Birney as Doctor

== Reception ==
New York Magazine praised Rogers' "typically terrific performance" in the film. Rogers also won the Best Actress prize for the film at the Seattle International Film Festival, with the Seattle Times praising her "strong" performance.
