= David Cardy =

English actor

- Occupation: Actor
- Years active: 1970s–present
- Television: Birds of a Feather

David Cardy is an English actor. With a career on stage and screen spanning over five decades, he is known for portraying the role of Chris Theodopolopodous in the BBC sitcom Birds of a Feather (1989, 1997–1998, 2014) and has appeared in numerous stage productions, as well as various other television series and films including The Bill, The Chief and EastEnders.

== Life and career ==
After beginning his career on stage, Cardy's first television role was in an episode of Rock Follies of '77. In 1989, he was cast in the BBC sitcom Birds of a Feather as Chris Theodopolopodous, the imprisoned husband of main character Sharon Theodopolopodous (Pauline Quirke). He departed the role after the first series, with Chris being recast to Peter Polycarpou; however, Cardy returned to the role for the penultimate and final series of the original BBC run between 1997 and 1998. He reprised the role again for an episode in the ITV revival in 2014. Cardy has had roles in numerous television shows and films, including numerous episodes of The Bill, before taking on a recurring role of Max Wyatt in 2003. He also appeared in over sixty productions on stage including A Midsummer Night's Dream, King Lear and The Importance of Being Earnest. In 2025, he starred in Ghost Stories at Peacock Theatre in the West End.

== Filmography ==
Year	Title	Role	Notes
1977	Rock Follies of '77	Punk Rock Group	Episode: "The Hype"
1978	Hazell	Harry	Episode: "Hazell and the Walking Blur"
1978	Crown Court	Johnny Jeffery	3 episodes
1982	Saturday Night Thriller	Felix	Episode: "Broken Glass"
1982	Xtro	Michael	Film
1983	The Winds of War	Sgt. Johnson	Episode: "Defiance"
1983	The Keep	Alexandru's Son	Film role
1984	Play for Today	Tony	Episode: "Under the Hammer"
1984	The Bill	Lionel Dixon	Episode: "Rough in the Afternoon"
1985	Summer Season	Reporter	Episode: "Time Trouble"
1985	Honeymoon	Photographer	Television film
1986	C.A.T.S. Eyes	Customs Man	Episode: "Passage Hawk"
1987	Prick Up Your Ears	Brian Epstein	Film role
1987	Little Dorrit	3 Thimble Man	Film role
1988	Campaign	Stephen Hallam	Regular role
1989	Vote for Them	Signalman Jacobs	3 episodes
1989	Hard Cases	Tony Farmer	2 episodes
1989, 1997–1998, 2014	Birds of a Feather	Chris Theodopolopodous	Recurring role
1990	Nightingales (TV series)	DC Martin	Episode: "Scrutiny of the Bounty"
1990	Stay Lucky	Ricardo	Episode: "Bigamy Blues"
1990	London's Burning	Ronnie	1 episode
1990–1991	The Chief	Martin Stewart	5 episodes
1991	The Bill	Billy	Episode: "Now We're Motoring"
1992	Fool's Gold: The Story of the Brink's-Mat Robbery	Tony Black	Television film
1992	The New Statesman	Arturo	Episode: H*A*S*H
1992	The Comic Strip Presents...	Trevor Moulton	Episode: "The Crying Game"
1993	The Comic Strip Presents...	Frank	Episode: "Queen of the Wild Frontier"
1993	The Bill	Mr. Dean	Episode: "Pride and Joy"
1993	Screenplay	Barry	Episode: "Safe"
1994	Minder	Harding	Episode: "Bring Me the Head of Arthur Daley"
1994	The Bill	Ken Graley	Episode: "Now We're Motoring"
1994	Jo Brand Through the Cakehole	Various	1 episode
1994	Casualty	James Bowen	Episode: "Chasing the Dragon"
1994	Chef!	Grant	Episode: "Private Lives"
1994	EastEnders	Mr. Kelsey	2 episodes
1995	Kavanagh QC	Alan Kendall	Episode: "Nothing But the Truth"
1995	The Glam Metal Detectives	Additional cast / Harry / Dave Rumbelow	3 episodes
1995	Absolutely Fabulous	Candid Cameraman	Episode: "Fear"
1995	3 Steps to Heaven	Hood 1	Television film
1996	The Bill	Terry Makin	Episode: "With This Ring"
2003	The Bill	Max Wyatt	13 episodes
2001	EastEnders	Mr. Hunter	2 episodes
1998	Getting Hurt	Julian Rathbone	Television film
1998	No Sweat	Mickey Freeman	Episode: "Friends or Fortune?"
1998	Monk Dawson	Pimp	Film role
2001	Silent Witness	Tony Marks	2 episodes
2003	A Touch of Frost	Len Morrison	Episode: Another Life
2004	The Baby Juice Express	Goldberg	Film role

== Stage ==
Title	Role
Ghost Stories	Tony Matthews
One Man, Two Guvnors	Charlie Clench
The Importance of Being Earnest	Reverend Canon Chasuble
Breakfast at Tiffany's	O.J. Berman / Dr Goldman
The Inn at Lydda	Thrysullus
Tipping the Velvet	Chairman
Made in Dagenham	Monty
Not Now Darling / Caught in the Net	Harry McMichael / Stanley
Dreamboats and Petticoats	Phil / Older Bobby
Basket Case	James
Ghost Stories	Tony Matthews
Treasure Island	Billy Bones
All Quiet on the Western Front	Kat
The Changeling	Lollio
Dick Whittington	Fitzwarren / Sultan
Gadaffi	Reporter
Losing Louis	Reg
Presence	Ray
Playing God	Ed
King Lear	Various
Property	Bulldog Billy / Bollinger
Funny Money	Slater
King Lear	The Fool
Taking Steps	Lesley
Bones	Reg
What the Butler Saw	Sgt. Match
Why Me?	Arthur Hollis
Troilus and Cressida	Agamemnon
Chimes at Midnight	Pistol / Worcester
Don Juan / The Taming of the Shrew	Sganarelle / Petruchio
Nabokov's Gloves	Clerk of Chambers
The Wizard of Oz	Scarecrow
Measure for Measure	Pompey
The Shallow End	Budge
Pickwick	Sam
The Tempest	Caliban
The Comedy of Errors	Antipholus of Syracuse
The Comedians	Sammy Samuels
Penny Blue	Dougie
On the Razzle	Weinberl
Baby Love	Stewart
Arabian Nights	Sinbad
Double Take	Harry
Coriolanus	Citizen
The Three Musketeers	Athos
Twelfth Night	Fabian
As You Like It	Touchstone
Fertility Dance	Max
Men in Suits	Cottee
A Chorus of Disapproval	Ian Hubbard
On the Edge	Jimmy
One for the Road	Dennis
Sunday Morning / Up for None	Jeremy / Sneaky
Command or Promise / True Dare Kiss	Danny
The Rocky Horror Picture Show	Dr. Scott / Eddie
Progress	Mark
Can't Pay? Won't Pay!	Luigi
No End of Blame	Mr. Mik
Mephisto	Alex
Love's Labour's Lost / A Midsummer Night's Dream	Costard / Puck
The Taming of the Shrew	Haberdasher
