= Kappatoo =

- Created by: Ben Steed
- Starring: Simon Nash
- Country of origin: United Kingdom
- Original language: English
- No. of series: 2
- No. of episodes: 14

Production
- Running time: 30 mins
- Production companies: Worldwide International TV and Tyne Tees Television

Original release
- Network: ITV (CITV)
- Release: 23 May 1990 – 21 May 1992

Kappatoo is a CITV comedy drama, based on the book by Ben Steed and starring Simon Nash in the dual roles of the eponymous time-traveller from the future and his lookalike, 1990s schoolboy soccer player Simon Cashmere. Andrew O'Connor played the human form of Kappatoo's computer (and also wrote some of the episodes), while Rula Lenska played a time-travelling villain, and Denise Van Outen and Sarah Alexander appeared in juvenile roles as schoolgirls.

In the series, Kappatoo travels back in time from the twenty-third century to 1990/92 to swap places with his identical 'time twin' Simon Cashmere, who is stronger and more athletic but less intellectual than the humans of the future, in order to cheat in a futuristic sports contest. Kappatoo lives in the past whilst Simon lives in the far off future. In the future, each person has a name that is a Greek letter followed by a string of digits. Kappatoo's full name is Κ270934.

The series premiered on CITV in 1990, with a follow-up series, Kappatoo II, broadcast in 1992; it was made by Worldwide International TV for Tyne Tees Television. Filming took place at Heaton Manor School in High Heaton, Newcastle upon Tyne with characters and extras using authentic school uniform from Heaton Manor School.

== Episodes ==
=== Series 1 ===
No.	Title	Original release date
1	"A Stitch In Time"	23 May 1990
Kappatoo, who lives in the year 2270, has his computer scan the history files for a time twin who looks exactly like him, so he can swap places and have the time twin beat his arch enemy Sigmasix on The Hypergrid. The computer locates an identical time twin called Simon Cashmere, who lives with his parents and sister Lucy in the year 1990. Kappatoo time travels back to Simon Cashmere's bedroom and explains that the two will change places. After some brief hesitation by Simon, it is agreed that in return for Simon beating Sigmasix in The Hypergrid, Kappatoo will ace an upcoming computer test and try and convince Tracy Cotton to go out with Simon. Simon then travels to Kappatoo’s time. The next morning, Kappatoo realises how difficult it will be for him to live in the twentieth century, not realising that people move around so much and can’t just particle beam to where they want. He struggles to adapt. On the other hand, Simon is enjoying the twenty-third century and enjoys the company of Mufour - a girl Kappatoo is interested in - so he refuses to swap back when contacted by Kappatoo.
2	"Ravages Of Time"	30 May 1990
Kappatoo is still struggling to get used to the twentieth century, after blowing up the vacuum cleaner, thinking it is a hostile life form, and being caught stealing £47 worth of pet food from the local supermarket after not knowing how shopping works in this time zone. Luckily, he has his wrist band to help him by freezing and rewinding time so he can correct the damage. But after freezing time to escape a police officer at the supermarket and finding that Lucy and her friend Sharon have broken into the school on a Saturday, it runs out of fuel, leaving Kappatoo unable to control time. Simon is still enjoying himself until Sigmasix keeps bragging about how he is going to defeat Kappatoo, not knowing it is really Simon on The Hypergrid. Kappatoo’s computer, who now has a human form, explains The Hypergrid to him and decides it would be best to let the computer teach him all about it and what best tactics to use.
3	"Time Slime and Tiswas"	6 June 1990
Kappatoo adapts the phone line and Simon's computer so that he can talk to his computer in his time, to find out what is wrong with his wrist band. The computer advises Kappatoo that it just needs some more fuel to operate; the only problem is that the fuel it uses is not available in Simon’s time, nor will it be for the next 200 years. By using Simon's washing machine and their next-door neighbour's satellite dish, some more fuel can be made. Kappatoo does this and has now regained the use of his wrist band. He also confesses to Steve, Simon's best friend, after a little time; and seeing Kappatoo beam out of Simon's kitchen, Steve comes to realise the truth. On the other hand, Kappatoo does not do well in the local football match against another school, which Simon watches from the future very unhappily. Simon does do really well in The Hypergrid contest, and beats Sigmasix, to everybody’s surprise and delight. On the other hand, Sigmasix does not accept defeat graciously and beams into Kappatoo’s dome to accuses who he believes is Kappatoo of cheating.
4	"Tracey Times Two"	13 June 1990
Kappatoo uses his wrist band to distort time at the football match so that everybody else is moving at a quarter of the speed of him, allowing him to score seventeen goals and his team to win the match. Tracy, who Simon is madly in love with and who Kappatoo has been trying to impress for Simon as his part deal, agrees to come to the party with him that is being held at Simon’s house that night, after Steve’s parents told Steve it could no longer be hosted at his house. However, Tracy makes it clear that if she is left alone for more than ten seconds, she will leave. All is going well at the party until a pot gets broken and Kappatoo goes to investigate, leaving Tracy. She leaves, annoyed, and to stop the pot getting broken, Kappatoo reverses time; as Tracy is outside of the space where time is rewound, another Tracy appears at the party. With some help from the computer and Steve, who coaxes Tracy back to the party, Kappatoo gets the two girls to touch and rewinds time, solving the issue. Simon's parents arrive, not too happy with a party going on and a giant hole gushing water in the front garden after the washing machine blew a mains pipe, after being used to make fuel for Kappatoo’s wrist band. Simon watches the rest of the match and is overjoyed at how well Kappatoo has done, but his excitement is short-lived when Sigmasix beams into the dome and advises Simon that he is bringing a statutory declaration of charges against Kappatoo for cheating at The Hypergrid. Simon initially believes he can lie his way out of it, but the computer informs him he will have to wear a truth detector and to beat it would be impossible.
5	"Time Fuse"	20 June 1990
Simon's parents speak to Simon - not knowing he is Kappatoo - about the party, the hole in the front garden and the broken vase, as well as his strange behaviour over the past couple of days. But they are relieved that he is okay and suggest he comes with them to church so they can keep an eye on him. Outside the church, Kappatoo sees Tracy with Gregory, a popular boy at their school, whom she asks out on a date. Simon's teacher makes a visit to speak to Simon's parents about how well Simon has done in the computer test at school. After reading a book, with Sharon, about aliens from Alpha Centauri, Lucy believes that Simon has been taken over by an alien from there, which leads to her throwing a glass of water over Kappatoo, believing he will melt away just like the character in the book she and Sharon were reading. Simon attends the trial at the court and answers Sigmasix’s questions, wearing the truth detector in front of the judges. Sigmasix asks three questions to Kappatoo about cheating in The Hypergrid, but because it is Simon wearing the truth detector, not Kappatoo, and by switching places in time, Kappatoo cheated and not Simon, the truth detector states that Kappatoo is telling the truth. He is acquitted and the judges depart. Outraged, Sigmasix realises this must not be Kappatoo and asks who it is while Simon is still wearing the truth detector. Simon replies his name and Sigmasix departs to find out where Simon is from. After his computer cannot find anybody with that name on the planet, Sigmasix threatens the computer that it will be history if it cannot locate him. Then Sigmasix realises that Simon is from the past.
6	"Mean Time"	27 June 1990
Kappatoo, who is used to everybody being equal in his time, gets into an argument with Simon's mother when she asks him to do the dishes. He then learns that Tracy is rooting for Gregory in the school's PTA pupil elections. Kappatoo uses his wrist band to causes a whirlwind on the stairs, trapping Gregory and blowing most of his clothes off. Gregory goes to the Drama department to find some new clothes to wear, but because of this and a passionate and emotional speech Kappatoo gives about the future, Gregory loses the election to Simon. That evening, as Kappatoo and Simon's family are having dinner, Tracy pops by and asks Simon to come over to her place that evening. Kappatoo is happy that he has improved Simon's life as part of the bargain, but feels a bit sorry for Simon being stuck in his time as he believes it is boring. Meanwhile, Simon is asked by Mufour what period of history he is most interested in but will not say why as it is a surprise. The two are approached by Sigmasix, who advises Simon that he knows how he cheated, and he does not have long until he proves it. Simon then attends a surprise birthday party hosted by Mufour with a twentieth-century theme, unaware that Sigmasix has acquired a time-belt and his heading back to 1990 to bring Kappatoo back and expose them both.
7	"Out of Time"	4 July 1990
Kappatoo calls his computer, asking where Simon is as he wants some information about romance for his upcoming date with Tracy. His computer informs him that Simon is attending Kappatoo’s birthday party and gives Kappatoo some hints about romance, as well as advising Kappatoo to give her a small gift. Kappatoo has dinner at Tracy’s house, as do Steve and Belinda; all of them have a really good time and Kappatoo really impresses Tracy with his story from the future about how humans should not burn fossil fuels. He almost comes close to telling her who he really is but decides against it. As they are saying goodbye and about to kiss, Tracy’s mother bangs on the window, interrupting them; with the moment ruined, they say goodbye and Kappatoo walks off right into the path of the waiting Sigmasix. Likewise, Simon is having a really good time at the party Mufour organised. They are interrupted briefly when Simon gets a message from the computer to return to Kappatoo’s dome. He takes Mufour back with him, helps the computer with a question from Simon and then they return to the party. Sigmasix instructs his computer to find a time-belt and he goes back to 1990 to capture Kappatoo, bring him back home and expose his cheating. Beaming back into Simon's bedroom, Simon’s mother advises him that Simon is at Tracy’s house. After some difficulty, both find Tracy’s house, and, after making his way there, not being used to having to walk, he arrives completely exhausted and confronts Kappatoo as he is leaving. After a brief chase through different locations using their wrist bands, Sigmasix becomes fused to climbing bars in the school’s gym. Kappatoo leaves him there, says goodbye to Steve at Simon's house, and travels back to his time using Sigmasix’s time-belt. Once there, his computer alerts the time travel police and they arrest Sigmasix. The time travel police stop briefly at Kappatoo’s dome as Sigmasix advised them of Simon, but since only Kappatoo is present, Sigmasix quickly withdraws his accusation, not knowing Simon is hiding in the dome. Simon says goodbye to Kappatoo and travels back to his time. It looks like all is well, but he gets a message via his computer on how to return the time-belt. As the message has interference, he types in the wrong number, and he and the belt are transported to the ergo sphere of a black hole, leaving Kappatoo no choice but to try to rescue his friend.

=== Series 2 (1992) ===
No.	Title	Original release date
8	"Time After Time"	9 April 1992
Two years after the events of the first series, Kappatoo and his computer watch Simon on the histogram and see that he keeps suffering from a recurring nightmare of himself being sucked into the black hole that he accidentally sent himself to at the end of the first season. It transpires that after rescuing him, Kappatoo had a memory freeze placed on Simon and Steve so that they do not remember anything about Kappatoo and the time swap. Kappatoo worries that it may be wearing off. While he is relaxing at the local café, Zeta’s, a friend of his rushes in and inform him that Sigmasix has been released from psycho correction and is being returned home. Kappatoo returns to his dome and his computer advises him that Sigmasix must apologise to him as part of his release, but has serious doubts that the psycho-correction has had any effect. Kappatoo meets Sigmasix at Zeta’s, as arranged, so he can apologise, which he does. Sigmasix is then placed into the custody of his aunt, Zeta 8, who agrees to be held responsible for any of his actions; Kappatoo still cannot believe he has changed. Once Sigmasix and Zeta return to her dome, it immediately becomes apparent that he has not changed and vows to get revenge on Kappatoo. It also becomes clear that Zeta bought Sigmasix out of psycho-correction with the sole intention of getting revenge on Kappatoo, for the damage that Sigmasix being caught time-travelling and being sent to psycho-correction has done to the family name. Zeta knows the truth and intends to expose Kappatoo as a real time criminal. Apart from having the same nightmare, Simon seems to be leading a normal life and has no memory of his time swap with Kappatoo. Together with Steve, Lucy and her friend Sharon, he heads off to Devon to spend the summer holiday on his Uncle Brian’s farm. It transpires that Simon knows nothing about his Uncle Brian, as he suspects that he has loads of money. This turns out not to be the case, as Brian, his wife Hazel and their daughter Melonie lead a simplistic lifestyle. Steve soon begins to regret coming, especially as he and Simon have to sleep in an old caravan. But the appearance of Simon’s really attractive cousin Melonie soon changes his mind, as they both immediately fall in love with her and volunteer to help out with her duties while they are there.
9	"It's About Time"	16 April 1992
Kappatoo’s computer has been snooping around into Zeta’s company, Zeta Corporation, trying to find something bad about it. Kappatoo advises that it is wasting its time and goes off to Zeta’s café to revise with Taufour for his upcoming appearance on Ultramatch. While Kappatoo is at Zeta’s café, Sigmasix appears and wishes him good luck to further keep up the pretense, not knowing that it is all an act. While Kappatoo was away, his computer got a video message from somebody else who has been looking into Zeta Corporation, giving them access to its secure system. When checked, it shows Zeta 8 in various different time periods, stealing relics from various famous people. Having been behind the video message left for Kappatoo, allowing his computer to access Zeta Corporation's systems, Zeta 8 stages a video call to Sigmasix, claiming to have found evidence of Kappatoo and Simon's illegal time swap. Kappatoo tells his computer to work out how to get into Zeta’s dome, so that while they are watching Ultramatch at the studio, he can steal the evidence. There is only one problem: Kappatoo will be at Ultramatch as well. Kappatoo sends his computer back to fetch Simon back and have him go on Ultramatch while he tries to steal the evidence from Zeta’s dome. Both Simon and Steve are woken up by Melonie at 5 o’clock in the morning to help with the milking, both not having realised it would require getting up so early. While they are milking the cows, Simon asks Steve if the name Kappatoo means anything to him, but Steve has no knowledge of the name at all. At breakfast, Brian is reading an article in the local paper about crop circles, and as Steve is skeptical about UFOs being involved, Brian tells him to keep an open mind. While Simon and Steve are out picking potatoes, they are found by the computer, in a disguise looking like a country yokel and talking in an extreme Devon accent. Simon recognises the computer, as his mind freeze seems to have worn off, but Steve does not. The computer advises Steve he needs to borrow Simon for a moment to help him in a field, and then disappear with Simon, who at first does not want to return to the future; but after hearing that Sigmasix has been released and Zeta is posing a new threat, he reluctantly agrees. After Kappatoo advises Simon what he needs to know for Ultramatch and a brief meeting with Kappatoo’s mother, Simon beams to the Ultramatch studio. After seeing that Sigmasix and Zeta are watching, Simon advises Kappatoo to beam into Zeta’s dome to try and find and steal the evidence she has on them. Once Kappatoo has beamed into Zeta’s dome, he is caught by Zeta, Sigmasix and Zeta’s Masterclass computer. Meanwhile, back in Simon's time, both Steve and Melonie start to notice that Simon has vanished.
10	"Bad Timing"	23 April 1992
Zeta contacts the time police and asks them to come over to her dome quickly. Kappatoo’s Masterclass computer watches the events from his dome and realises that he and Simon are in serious trouble. Back at Zeta’s dome, a time police officer arrives, and Zeta informs him that Kappatoo is here with them and thus the Kappatoo on Ultramatch is really his time twin, Simon Cashmere. The officer advises Zeta that he will take Kappatoo back to his dome and arrest Simon when he comes back off Ultramatch; the officer then beams Kappatoo back to his dome. Once there, the officer suddenly changes into Kappatoo’s computer and is advised that it was all a trick. Two time police officers arrive at Zeta’s dome, and at first, she thinks they are following up on the original officer’s case; when it becomes apparent that no other officers have been sent, she demands they all beam over to Kappatoo’s dome. The officers are hesitant, but obey. Luckily, Kappatoo has just beamed back to Simon's time to fill in for him, seconds before the officers, Zeta and Sigmasix arrive. After Kappatoo cannot be found anywhere in the dome, Zeta is forced to apologise for the intrusion to Kappatoo’s computer and everybody departs. Back at Zeta’s dome, she brushes the whole thing off as a minor setback and after her computer checks the histogram files and locates Kappatoo, she informs Sigmasix he is going back to Simon's time with her computer to bring Kappatoo home. She gives Sigmasix a special wrist band so he can contact her, as well as a time pad and a set of coordinates to send him to once he is captured, and he and the computer travel back to Simon's time. Kappatoo arrives back in Simon's time and can offer no explanation as to where he has been. Later, when he and Steve are in the caravan, he tells Steve he is not Simon but Kappatoo, and Steve believes him, since his memory freeze appears to be failing as well. The next day, Kappatoo has trouble milking a cow and uses his wrist band to make it talk, but cannot stop it. The two of them also go fishing and Kappatoo again uses his wrist band to make this fish shout at them out of the water. Kappatoo is then caught by Sigmasix and Zeta’s computer, and taken to a nearby barn to be sent him back to his time. Simon beams back from Ultramatch, expecting to find Kappatoo waiting for him, but the computer fills him in on what happened and that unfortunately, as Kappatoo has the time-belt, he is stuck there for the time being. Both he and Kappatoo’s computer watch the histogram and see Sigmasix and Zeta’s computer travel back to Simon's time and attempt to capture Kappatoo. Sigmasix and Zeta's computer find Kappatoo and, after a brief struggle, places him on the time pad and sets it to transport him to the coordinates Zeta gave him in 100 seconds. However, Steve shows up and allows Kappatoo to slow time down, and a fight between the four of them occurs. While they are fighting, Lucy comes into the barn where they are looking for a Frisbee that she threw, and just as the timer runs out on the time pad, she steps on it, transporting herself to Zeta’s café in Kappatoo’s time in front of Simon, the time police and Zeta.
11	"Bang on Time"	30 April 1992
Lucy arrives in Zeta’s café, not knowing where she is and how she got there. Simon quickly comes forward and tells everybody that Lucy is his grandmother and she looks so young because she has undergone a rejuvenation procedure common in Kappatoo’s time; this has sent her a bit crazy. Unable to take it in, Lucy faints and is helped by the time travel police who, after making sure she is ok, gives Zeta a ticking off for twice now bringing unfounded allegations against Kappatoo. As Simon is about to beam back to Kappatoo’s dome with his sister, Zeta invites them both to a grandmothers' party that evening, which Simon reluctantly agrees to let Lucy attend. Sigmasix contacts Zeta via his wrist band, and she angrily demands her computer return to her dome and then advises Sigmasix of his next move. Simon and the computer then set about the task of teaching her several decades of history - or in her case, future - so she will not stick out at the party where Lucy is a big hit with the other grandmothers and, apart from Lucy mentioning a few twentieth-century celebrities, the evening goes off without any incident. Once Zeta’s computer has returned to her dome, she advises that the real problem for them is Kappatoo’s computer, and hers sets about building a circuit to disable it. Once built, it beams over to Kappatoo’s dome and gives it the corrupted circuit. When Simon and Lucy have both beamed back to Kappatoo’s dome, Simon sees on the histogram his mother speaking to Kappatoo, demanding to speak to Lucy; he advises the computer Lucy needs to go home. After Lucy is transported to the future, Sigmasix and Zeta’s computer beam away, and Sharon comes into the barn looking for Lucy. Kappatoo and Steve tell her a bizarre story about her running off with a biker she has been seeing for the past two years. Sharon agrees to play along if the two of them buy her an expensive pair of trainers. Kappatoo adapts the television so that he can contact Simon, while Steve moans about how they are going to get the money for Sharon’s new trainers. Melonie interrupts them and asks them to come bowling with her, but Kappatoo advises her that they are too busy. Kappatoo manages to get through to his dome and his computer advises him that Lucy has to stay there until after the party. Kappatoo works out a plan so that Lucy will not be missed by claiming that she has gone bowling with him and Melonie. Annoyed, Steve states he is coming as well, and Sharon joins them. At the bowling alley, Melonie asks where Lucy is and Kappatoo makes the excuse she is getting some snacks, has no luck on his go, and then uses his wrist band to make the bowling machine lift the pins when Steve is bowling. When they all get home, Hazel asks where Lucy is, and Kappatoo advises that a friend is going to drop her off. Hazel is unconvinced, but before she can say any more, the phone rings and it is Simon and Lucy’s mother. After Kappatoo speaks to her, Lucy appears, having beamed back from the future. Brian demands an explanation from Lucy, but before she can speak, there is an explosion outside. They all rush out to see several different coloured energy fields, which Brian believes are poltergeists. Kappatoo freezes them all in time and gets rid of them using his wrist band; at that moment, Sigmasix appears and tells Kappatoo this was just a test, before beaming away. Once unfrozen, they make their way back into the house, Brian still convinced it is the supernatural, but Kappatoo seeing Sigmasix watching him.
12	"Wrong Time, Wrong Place"	7 May 1992
Kappatoo speaks to Simon via the television and advises him of what happened the following evening, and with Sigmasix still on the loose, he should not come back; Simon tells Kappatoo that he saw the events on the histogram as well. The computer advises Kappatoo that this is what Zeta wants, before starting to act very strangely and playing random songs. Kappatoo asks the computer if it is okay and he replies that it must be something he has picked up. Back in Kappatoo’s dome, the computer is still acting strangely. Simon mulls over what Sigmasix could be doing back in his time and what Zeta's overall plan is, then wonders when it will be safe for Kappatoo to return. Things get even worse and the computer starts acting really erratically and seems to have no control over itself. Kappatoo then contacts Simon via the television and informs Simon that Sigmasix has kidnapped Lucy. As the computer is still behaving strangely, Kappatoo talks Simon through how to run a basic maintenance check on the computer, but Simon does not know how to perform it and the computer tries to avoid an override command that Kappatoo tells Simon to use. As the computer will still not cooperate with an override, Simon freezes it and heads off to the studios for a rehearsal for Ultramatch. At the studio, Simons says to the other contestants that he is a little nervous and it appears they all are as well. Zeta and her computer arrive at the rehearsal; she asks Simon how his computer is and advises him that computers can contract very nasty viruses. Back at Kappatoo’s dome, he speaks to his computer about Sigmasix kidnapping Lucy and is advised that he come back to his dome. Once the call has ended, the computer turns and asks Zeta if that was what she wanted him to say, implying it is now under her total control. Sigmasix wakes up with a call from Zeta on his wrist band, where she advises him of the next part of her plan. Back at the farm, Brian is showing everyone an article in a book about the same event that happened in the past, involving a girl being possessed by a poltergeist. Although he will not admit it, he finds it strange that Lucy disappears and when she comes back, similar events have happened. Hazel is unconvinced, but asks everybody to stay around the farm, so they know where they are. Later, Sharon is angry with Lucy as she will not tell her where she has been, and Sharon does not believe the story Kappatoo and Steve told her. The two are in the caravan talking about Melonie when Sigmasix uses his wrist band to set it rolling down a hill after sealing the door shut. They are both thrown from the caravan and left unhurt, and rush back to the farm to tell Brian. Lucy relents and tells Sharon everything, but Sharon does not believe a word of it and is on the brink of calling her father to pick her up, when Sigmasix beams into their bedroom and kidnaps Lucy. As Kappatoo and Steve make their way into the kitchen, they do not get a chance to mention the caravan incident, as everybody knows that Sigmasix has kidnapped Lucy. Melonie interrupts them and thinks that Simon and the computer are on a television programme; she informs them that Brian wants to question them in the kitchen about Lucy’s disappearance. Sharon tells them all she knows about it, including her trip to the future. All Brian seems interested in is whether Simon is Simon or, if he is as Sharon claims, an alien. Brian runs a full physical on Kappatoo, but can only conclude he is human, much to Steve's relief. Just then, the phone rings and Brian and Hazel know it will be Lucy and Simon's mother; Brian just picks up the receiver and drops it again, not wanting to have to explain that Lucy has vanished again. Not wanting to talk any further, Kappatoo freezes everybody apart from Steve and the two beam away. As they are looking around the farm, trying to find Sigmasix and Lucy, they spot him and her frozen, but he beams away with her before Kappatoo can stop him.
13	"Dangerous Times"	14 May 1992
Zeta and her computer leave Kappatoo’s dome just before Simon returns from the rehearsal for Ultramatch. Kappatoo arrives back in his dome and advises that first and foremost, they have to get Lucy back. Unhappy with the way the computer is still responding, Kappatoo threatens to scrap it for a new one. Just then, a call comes through from Zeta, saying she does not want Lucy but him; she advises that he beams over to her dome right away. Kappatoo beams over to Zeta’s dome and Lucy is returned. Kappatoo’s computer follows, telling Simon he may be able to negotiate something. But when he arrives, his loyalty to Zeta is confirmed. Kappatoo’s computer asks to look at the time antiques that Zeta has collected. While she shows them off, Kappatoo’s computer asks her how she manages to time-travel so often and not get caught; she openly shows the computer am antique time-travel device and explains that she never uses the same method twice. The computer returns to Kappatoo’s dome, now pretending to be loyal to Kappatoo, and advises Simon he will have to take Kappatoo’s place on Ultramatch. Simon, the computer and Lucy watch from the future and the computer advises he will send Lucy back to help Steve, and Simon must get to Ultramatch. Simon is about to go on Ultramatch when Kappatoo’s computer arrives and gives him an ear-piece so it can advise him of the answers to the questions. While Kappatoo’s computer is answering the questions correctly, Zeta advises Sigmasix and her computer to send Kappatoo onto the stage at precisely the right moment. Simon loses communication with the computer and cannot answer the next set of questions; another contestant draws level with him and the final question he manages to answer by fluke, winning the match. As the sponsor of Ultramatch, Zeta arrives for what people believe is the prize presentation, but instead she has Kappatoo beamed onto the stage and Kappatoo’s computer give evidence that Kappatoo time-travelled illegally to have Simon replace him on both The Hypergrid and Ultramatch. Kappatoo and Steve search the destroyed caravan for the time-belt and locate it. Before Kappatoo leaves, he gives Steve his wrist band so he can release Brian, Hazel, Sharon and Melonie. Steve unfreezes everybody and as Kappatoo was there when they were frozen, he is not what they all believe, having vanished into thin air. Brian refuses to believe that Simon did not do exactly that, then suddenly spots the video camera and realises it will have recorded everything. Brain watches the recording and sees Kappatoo freeze time and then beam him and Steve out of the kitchen. Brian refuses to believe Steve's claim that this is all an elaborate joke, even when Lucy arrives back claiming she has been swimming. He goes off to make a telephone call for some advice. Lucy and Steve are playing chess and thinking of a way of trying to stop Brian from telling people about what he saw; not able to think of anything, they both agree to wait. While Brian is feeding the cows, the one that Kappatoo made talk starts talking to him. Brian comes back and speaks to everybody informing them that after all the events he has witnessed he is going to call the newspapers.
14	"Home Time"	21 May 1992
Kappatoo’s computer states to the audience Ultramatch that it is true Kappatoo did indeed time-travel and the person who won Ultramatch is Simon Cashmere from the year 1992. But in an incredible twist, the computer names not Kappatoo as the master time criminal but Zeta, who in turn tries to brush it all off as lies, but the computer informs the police to check Zeta’s dressing room to find Sigmasix wearing a wrist band designed for time travel, which they do, and he is subsequently arrested. The computer then shows video evidence of Zeta at various different points of history collecting her antiques, as well as a recording of her telling the computer how she acquired several items and how she time-travels so often. Back at Kappatoo’s dome, the computer explains that he never had a virus and the whole thing was an act to make Zeta think her plan was working. Just then, the computer gets a message saying that the time police want to stop by with Zeta and Sigmasix. The time police inform Kappatoo that unless he is willing to formally bring charges against Zeta and Sigmasix, they will be unable to prosecute them. At first it looks as though Kappatoo will not bring charges as he knows how powerful Zeta is, but just as it looks as though Zeta and Sigmasix are safe, Kappatoo tells her he will see them in court. Zeta is horrified as she and Sigmasix are beamed away by the time police, much to the delight of Simon and the computer. The time police then advise the computer to return Simon to his own time zone, but the computer allows him to stay for the night under the condition that he returns the next morning. The next day, while Simon and Kappatoo are enjoying breakfast at Zeta’s café, Kappatoo gets an urgent message to return with Simon to his dome; once there, the computer advises Kappatoo and Simon about Brian's press conference and how time-travel being discovered in the twentieth century could have a disastrous effect on the space-time continuum. Brian tells everybody at the farm that the reporters will be there first thing in the morning, and he wants them all there to answer any questions. Hazel begs the children to stop this joke before Brian makes a fool of himself, but knowing it is not a joke, there is nothing they can do. Steve, Lucy and Sharon try to convince Melonie the truth, and at first, she thinks they are lying, until Steve uses Kappatoo’s wrist band to lift a chair, and she realises that the press conference the next morning has to be stopped. Once Brian and Hazel are asleep, they all hatch a plan for the next morning involving Steve getting hold of the videocamera recording and Lucy and Sharon getting hold of some outfits. The next morning, Hazel begs Brian not to go through with his speech to the press, but he will not back down. Steve, Lucy and Sharon put their plan into action. Melonie and Sharon dress as ballerinas and speak like characters from RV series. Brian gives his speech, but the reporters seem unconvinced; this gets worse when Steve and Lucy pretend to be aliens, when questioned. Brian tries to show the reporters the recording, but it is quickly switched by Melonie for one of Sharon, Melonie and Lucy dancing. Desperate not to lose the reporters, Brian demands they follow him and speak to the cow. Steve has forgotten the cow and as they make their way out to the field, he quickly uses the wrist band to stop it talking, but not before changing its moo for various other farm animal noises, and Brian making some very funny movements uncontrollably. The reporters all believe this is a joke and quickly leave. Simon and Kappatoo watch the antics at the farm and Simon believes that, since no time travel evidence was uncovered, everything is okay. The computer uses a probability algorithm though to show what will happen in the future based on this event: it transpires that Brian was left homeless and destitute after not willing to let go what he had seen; Hazel got the life she always wanted by remarrying for money, but was no happier for it; Melonie dropped out of university and became a single mother, and Lucy ran away from home and became a down-and-out. The computer believes it can solve the problem by creating a new timeline by returning Simon to the moment after he first left his time, and make sure he was never missed and thus the chain of events that followed does not happen; only Simon will remember everything. Simon says goodbye to Kappatoo and the computer and returns to his time a split second after he and the computer first left. Simon sends the time-belt back to Kappatoo’s time and makes his way back to the farm and the caravan. He and Steve make their way back to the house to see if Melonie has come back from town. While they are helping her with the washing, a car horn hoots and she says that it is her boyfriend and goes out to meet him. As she gets into his car, Simon realises that he is a time twin of Sigmasix. This event is observed by Kappatoo and his computer on the histogram and, although they both believed his future was now okay, they now worry there may well be more trouble ahead.
