= Xtro II: The Second Encounter =

1991 film directed by Harry Bromley Davenport

- Canadian release art
- Directed by: Harry Bromley Davenport
- Written by: John A. Curtis; Stephen Lister; Robert Smith; Edward Kovach
- Produced by: John A. Curtis; Lloyd A. Simandl
- Starring: Jan-Michael Vincent; Paul Koslo; Tara Buckman; Nicholas Lea
- Cinematography: Nathaniel Massey
- Edited by: Derek Whelan
- Music by: Braun Farnon; Robert Smart
- Production companies: North American Pictures; Excalibur Pictures
- Distributed by: Nova Releasing (Canada); New Line Cinema (U.S.)
- Release date: 28 June 1991 (Canada)
- Running time: 92 minutes
- Countries: Canada; United Kingdom
- Language: English
- Budget: CAD$1 million

Xtro II: The Second Encounter is a 1991 British–Canadian science fiction horror film directed by Harry Bromley Davenport and starring Jan-Michael Vincent, Paul Koslo, Tara Buckman and Nicholas Lea. It is the second installment of the Xtro franchise, although is narratively distinct from the original. In it, a scientist is sent to another dimension by a secret government experiment, but brings back a murderous extraterrestrial creature which hunts down the research base's personnel. The film was conceived by Davenport, who retained the rights to the Xtro title and licensed them to Canadian producers.

== Plot ==
The U.S. Secretary of Defense Bob Kenmore (Bob Wilde) visits a government facility called Nexus, an underground laboratory controlled entirely by a computer, to witness a top-secret experiment which sends three volunteers Dawson, Hoffman and Marshall to another dimension. When they are in the parallel dimension, they are attacked by an unseen force. After this disaster, Kenmore threatens to shut Nexus down. The original architect of Nexus, Dr. Ron Shepherd, is coaxed out of retirement by his former lover Dr. Julie Cassidy, who is now one of Nexus's top scientists, to help investigate what went wrong. Shepherd had been previously forced out of the project after a disastrous previous experiment resulted in the laboratory complex exploding, and because of this reason, Julie's rival Dr. Alex Summerfield is strongly against his return.

In the meantime, a group of mercenaries, led by McShane is hired to help with the investigation. A signal is emitted from the parallel universe, which comes from Marshall, who is still alive and is brought back to the real world. Alex is scratched by an hysterical Marshall when he attempts to sedate her. Later, an alien parasite emerges from Marshall and escapes into the lab's ventilation system. Her body is found completely dehydrated. The alien, already reaching maturity, attacks and kills lab members Ford and Myers.

The lab is automatically locked down and the survivors separate into three groups in an effort to kill the creature, with McShane and Mancini getting killed by the alien. Alex begins exhibiting more symptoms from the infected due to the scratch by Marshall before. The group decide to climb the elevator shaft in order to reach the surface. Jedburg accidentally falls down the shaft after being starled by the alien and Baines sacrifices himself, by blowing up the elevator with him and the alien inside. However the alien emerges still alive, which is then killed by Shepherd.

Julie and Zunoski attempt to convince Alex to go the parallel universe, as they know he will die. He then shoots Zunoski and is forced into the platform and he is transferred to the parallel universe during his final transformation. Shepherd, Julie and an injured Zunoski ponder what to tell the world.

== Cast ==
- Jan-Michael Vincent as Dr. Ron Shepherd
- Paul Koslo as Dr. Alex Summerfield
- Tara Buckman as Dr. Julie Casserly
- Nicholas Lea as Baines
- Jano Frandsen as McShane
- W.F. Wadden as Jedburg
- Rolf Reynolds as Zunoski
- Nic Amoroso as Mancini
- Bob Wilde as Secretary Kenmore
- Rachel Hayward as Dr. Lisa Myers
- Tracy Westerholm as Marshall
- Gerry Nairn as Ford
- Nicola Crosbie as Medic Council
- Michael Metcalfe as Dawson
- Thom Schioler as Hoffman
- Steve Wright as Helicopter Pilot
- John McEwen as CIA Agent
- Harry Jaako as CIA Agent

== Production ==
=== Development and writing ===
In need of a job, director Harry Bromley Davenport discovered that, although he did not retain ownership of Xtro's story, he had a legal claim to the title itself, which enabled him to continue the series as a loose anthology about extraterrestrial encounters. Welsh producer John Eyres of EGM Film International licensed the rights with the support of Canadian outfit North American Pictures, with whom he had already collaborated on a pair of smaller projects. Bromley Davenport had little input on the narrative, which he called "artless" and was devised by his new partners with an eye for the broader sci-fi market. Although enthusiast publication Gorezone was quoted a budget of US$2 million, Canadian trade magazine Playback noted that it was the producers' first CAD$1 million budget, while U.S. counterpart Variety reported that it cost less than US$1 million. The amount was covered by the issuing of public shares for a new Canadian-based entity called Excalibur Pictures.

=== Filming ===
Photography started on 23 March 1990, and lasted five weeks. Only bits of the movie were shot on location, and the vast majority of filming took place inside Pilot One Studios, located on the former Expo 86 site in North American Pictures' hometown of Vancouver, British Columbia. This was North American's first 35 mm production. It was also the first time they employed a true art department. Although Bromley Davenport still found it somewhat understaffed for such a set-based production, he was satisfied with the diligence of the young crew. Most were Canadian, but some were brought over by EGM from the U.K., such as Eyres' regular cameraman Alan Trow. While he was open about the project's unfulfilling nature during filming, Bromley Davenport remained committed to delivering the best possible product.

The biggest problems were attributed to the leading man's behavior, as the British helmer later reflected: "It was an awful film with a drunkard Jan Michael Vincent wandering around, throwing up and hitting people. He was ghastly. [...] He couldn’t play a scene with somebody else because he was so out of it that he couldn’t remember his lines, or what the scene was. He made no effort at all in that film. He probably singlehandedly wrecked the project." Vincent often had to be shown in what direction he should look, and to be spoon fed his dialogue to perform.

=== Effects ===
The bulk of the creature effects, which incorporated miniatures and stop-motion animation, were handled by Cyberflex Films under the direction of Greg Derochie. The alien was designed by Cyberflex members Charlie Grant and Wayne Dang. Prosthetic make-up was handled by the ET & Company team headed by Tibor Farkas and Bill Terezakis, who had recently worked on the Vancouver-shot Friday the 13th Part VIII. Working under them was future industry mainstay Toby Lindala, who made his debut on this film. Actor Paul Koslo had to make a trip to the hospital after getting intoxicated from a smoke effect.

== Release ==
=== Pre-release ===
The film was screened for industry professionals at the 1990 MIFED (Mercato internazionale del film e del documentario) in Milan, Italy, as well as at both Spring and Fall 1991 American Film Markets.

=== Theatrical ===
In Canada, Xtro II was released in theaters by Nova Releasing on 28 June 1991.

=== Home media ===
In the U.S., Xtro II premiered on home video though New Line, which had also carried the theatrical original, on 25 September 1991. In Canada, the tape arrived the following week through Nova Home Video. In the U.K., the film also premiered on home video. It was apparently pegged for a release by Imperial Entertainment, but instead arrived via First Independent on 23 September 1992.

U.S. distributor Image Entertainment released Xtro II on DVD as part of a 2-disk special edition that also included the first film in the series on 6 December 2005, and later as a standalone feature on 30 May 2006. A U.K. DVD was issued by Film 2000 on 1 October 2007.

== Reception ==
Xtro II received mixed-to-positive reviews. The Encyclopedia of Science Fiction Movies found that "[o]ddly enough the sequel [...] is a somewhat better film [than its predecessor]. Perhaps the second time around the filmmakers had the sense to swipe their plot from a much better film, Alien. Ballantine Books' Video Movie Guide, which disliked the first installment, said that "[i]f you saw the original Xtro, forget all about it. Xtro II has a whole new exciting plot that doesn’t even follow the original." The Creature Features compendium assessed that "[o]nce in a great while a film derivative of a classic is inspired enough to transcend its own imitative weaknesses to take on a life of its own. This Canadian film is such a 'sleeper'. Although a spinoff of Aliens, Xtro II eventually builds a momentum of suspense, action and characterization that sends it spiraling above other imitations. This achieves what Alien 3 did not." Monstroid deemed that the film was akin to a collection of "Alien greatest hits, though it must be said that in its favour, the production values are very high, and director Davenport has shed the workmanlike approach of his first encounter, and here keeps the action tracking along at a fair pace." TV Guide concurred, writing that "Xtro 2 is not the only film to have taken its cue from Ridley Scott's Alien, but the story owes so much to that film and, to a lesser degree, James Cameron's Aliens, that it's tempting to call it a remake". However, it too noted that "[t]hough clearly made on a relatively low budget, Xtro 2 is attractively photographed and the overall production values are high." Variety added that "[p]roblems here include the fact that the monster tends to grow by eating human flesh, à la Alien, with lots of other gory details that resemble that pic. Script is no great shakes either [...] But North American Pictures/Releasing has never pitched screenplay or performance quality. This pic has tech credits comparable to special effects five or six times its budget and should do well in most foreign markets." VideoHound found that "this is a low-budget remake of Alien. Good photography, adequate acting, but Vincent just isn’t credible as a brilliant scientist." The compendium Sci-Fi on Tape voiced yet another similar opinion calling it "yet another variation of Alien mixed with Shadowzone. Slick but unremarkable."

VideoHound's Sci-Fi Experience called it "your basic Alien ripoff" and deemed that the "impressive photography and set design" were undone by an "inert" creature. Cinefantastique was equally dismissive of "an unimaginative Alien rip-off with a rubber monster never completely glimpsed for more than a couple of seconds. This Canadian effort is neither worthy of its title or worth the price of a rental." She also noted that "[c]lose-ups of bullets ricocheting off their creature bear no resemblance to any other shots of it." The Darkside magazine was most negative, feeling shortchanged by a "cynical sequel [...] which is absolutely nothing to do" with the original and was instead "a terrible Alien rip-off featuring scientists in an underground lab being menaced by a rod-manipulated lump of latex about as menacing as a balloon on a stick." It also complained that "[a]lthough a Canadian production, it seems partly dubbed".

== Sequel ==
This film was followed by 1995 movie Xtro 3: Watch the Skies, although that sequel has little to do with the original or this film, as it is a completely separate story with different characters.
