= Xtro 3: Watch the Skies =

1995 film directed by Harry Bromley Davenport

- Original poster
- Directed by: Harry Bromley Davenport
- Written by: Daryl Haney
- Produced by: Harry Bromley Davenport; Jamie Beardsley
- Starring: Sal Landi; Andrew Divoff; Karen Moncrieff; Jim Hanks; Virgil Frye; Robert Culp
- Cinematography: Irv Goodnoff
- Edited by: Krish Mani
- Music by: Van Rieben
- Production company: Dorian
- Distributed by: Triboro Entertainment
- Release date: November 14, 1995 (U.S.)
- Running time: 90 min.
- Countries: United Kingdom; United States
- Language: English

Xtro 3: Watch the Skies (also known as Xtro: Watch the Skies) is a 1995 science-fiction horror film directed by Harry Bromley Davenport and starring Sal Landi, Andrew Divoff, Karen Moncrieff, Jim Hanks, Virgil Frye and Robert Culp. It is the third installment in the series after Xtro and Xtro II: The Second Encounter, and is once again unconnected to the previous ones, other than through its alien intrusion themes. In it, an alien seeks revenge for experiments conducted by the American government on one of his fellow aliens forty years prior. It’s an international co-production film between the United Kingdom and the United States.

Comedy podcast RiffTrax (Michael J. Nelson, Bill Corbett and Kevin Murphy) recorded and released a riff in 2024.

== Plot ==
In a rundown motel, Lieutenant Martin Kirn meets with a reporter to tell what happened on his final military mission. Since at least World War II, the United States government has successfully covered up very real proof of U.F.O.s. However, when a group of U.S. Marines is dispatched to a deserted island to defuse an old ordinance. The military task force is not made-up of elite military units. Kim learns that Captain Fetterman chose the soldiers for the mission as they are expendable.

Despite their inadequacies, they soon suspect something is amiss about the mission. They uncover unsettling evidence, old films documenting brutal medical experiments on aliens, and find one person living on the island who Fetterman wants dead. They then discover a lone surviving alien out for revenge, and a military intelligence plot to sacrifice them and conceal existence of the encounter. The military is concerned the shroud of mystery is about to be lifted and decide to abandon the Marines. The lone person living on the island had conducted experiments on the alien before the alien had escaped.

== Cast ==
- Sal Landi as Lieutenant Martin Kirn
- Andrew Divoff as Captain Fetterman
- Karen Moncrieff as J.G. Watkins
- David M. Parker as Corporal Dermot Reilly
- Jim Hanks as Private Friedman
- Virgil Frye as The Survivor
- Andrea Lauren Herz as Private Banta
- Daryl Haney as Private Hendricks
- Nigel Gibbs as Smythe
- Robert Culp as Major Guardino
- Brian Cavanaugh as Wolf
- Paul Hayes as Mr. Atkins
- Jeanne Mori as Erica Stern
- Al Ruscio as The General
- Martin Starr as Biff Atkins
- Robert Madrid as Shaye

== Production ==
=== Development ===
While director Harry Bromley Davenport admits an affinity for the sci-fi genre, his return to the Xtro franchise itself was due to the difficulty of getting new projects off the ground, and the brand's recognition with investors. It was the Briton's first shoot in the U.S., which required minor adjustments on his part even though it was a non-union production. Bromley Davenport met Xtro 3 actor and screenwriter Daryl Haney through a mutual acquaintance at Roger Corman's Concorde, Haney's frequent employer. The pitch agreed upon by both men was "The Dirty Dozen meets Predator", although they were conscious to build on that with original motivations for the alien. In the script, the creature was seldom described, but was not a humanoid. However, the director opted to give it a more relatable shape so that it could elicit empathy from the audience. During writing, Haney knew that he would act in the film, but did not know which role he would be given.

=== Special and visual effects ===
Supervisor Paul Sammon and his company Awesome Productions were given five weeks to create the visual effects. Based on the script, only 16 effect shots were projected, but as the shoot went on, Bromley Davenport gained confidence and their number grew to 41. While it would have been cheaper, the director refused to use a man inside a suit, which he felt would not have worked for the expressive creature he wanted. Sammon used Silicon Graphics workstations running Wavefront Explorer Pro, which brought digital compositing to low-budget films around that time. Sammon hired Houston-based Zero Gravity and Digital Film Group, a division of Los Angeles' The Post Group to help produce the digital models. The physical creature and models were built by Modus EFX, a team led by David Barton, who also operated the alien's puppet. Suzanna Rupe handled both cosmetic and prosthetic make-up.

=== Filming ===
The filming title was just Watch the Skies, although it was understood that it would be released as an Xtro film. Photography took place across 36 days spread between September 26 and November 10, 1994, at several California locations. The story's island was primarily represented by the Iverson Movie Ranch in Chatsworth, with additional location work done at the Pölsa Rosa Ranch in Acton. The sets, such as the inside of the bunker inhabited by The Survivor, were built inside a warehouse in Burbank. Some further footage was also captured on boats off the coast. Paul Sammon and Andrew Divoff suffered cuts to their hands while filming at sea, while Virgil Frye's leg was injured by a squib and Sal Landi hurt his back. Bromley Davenport had more control over this installment's than its predecessor, and called it his favorite in the series, saying that whatever weaknesses the film may have were on him this time around.

== Release ==
=== Pre-release ===
Xtro 3 was promoted during the 1995 MIFED (Mercato internazionale del film e del documentario) trade show in Milan, Italy, where it was represented by Showcase Entertainment.

=== Home video ===
Xtro 3 debuted in the U.S. on VHS as Xtro: Watch the Skies through Triboro Entertainment on November 14, 1995, delayed from November 7, 1995. Image Entertainment released a LaserDisc version on March 1, 1996. Image also re-issued the film on DVD on June 29, 1999. On March 31, 2020, Xtro 3 was released on Blu-ray by Vinegar Syndrome with the participation of Bromley Davenport and Haney.

== Reception ==
Xtro 3 has received mixed reviews. The Fort Worth Star-Telegram was most positive, particularly towards the concept of an alien seeking revenge for human experiments. It called the film "an improvement in many regards" over the original, which "finds Davenport in sharper command, with fewer raveled plot threads and a meaner narrative disposition." It summed it up as "a paranoid chiller even Oliver Stone would be hard pressed to watch." Psychotronic Video assessed that "[t]his interesting alien cover-up movie is better than the other (unrelated) Xtro movies (all by the same director). [...] The opening b/w 50s newsreel is too silly but the big headed chameleon aliens with long tongues and tentacles are pretty good." The Creature Features horror film guide found that the film had moments of inspiration, but lacked a satisfying ending.

The Blockbuster Entertainment Guide to Movies and Videos called it "[a]s much a government-paranoia thriller as an alien film, and not very successful as either." Sci-fi on Tape: A Complete Guide to Science Fiction and Fantasy on Video called it "[p]ractically a remake of Xtro II", as well as "[t]otally suspenseless and lacking in excitement", and concluded that "Davenport really needs to get his hands on another franchise". British reference book Elliot's Guide to Home Entertainment summed it up as "[a] weak and totally unimaginative second sequel that is virtually unrelated to the first film". Ballantine Books' Video Movie Guide was negative, finding it to be "a familiar UFO-conspiracy story" and a step back from Xtro II". The Encyclopedia of Science Fiction Movies, which also liked the second film the best, judged that "it even falls short of the first in the series".

== Possible sequel ==
A third sequel was touted by Bromley Davenport in 2010. Xtro 3 writer Haney has written three possible scripts for Xtro 4.
