= Nobody's Perfect (British TV series) =

Television series

- Genre: Sitcom
- Written by: Elaine Stritch; Richard Griffiths
- Directed by: Christopher Baker
- Starring: Elaine Stritch; Richard Griffiths
- Country of origin: United Kingdom
- Original language: English
- No. of series: 2
- No. of episodes: 14

Production
- Producer: Humphrey Barclay
- Running time: 30 minutes
- Production company: LWT

Original release
- Network: ITV
- Release: 28 September 1980 – 12 September 1982

Nobody's Perfect is a British comedy television series which originally aired on ITV from 28 September 1980 to 12 September 1982. It was an adaptation of the American series Maude.

For the second episode of the second series, ITV accidentally screened a rough edit instead of the finished version.

== Main cast ==
- Elaine Stritch as Bill Hooper
- Richard Griffiths as Sam Hooper
- Moray Watson as Henry Armstrong
- Ruby Head as Mrs. Whicker
- Kim Braden as Liz Parker
- Simon Nash as Sammy

== Bibliography ==
- Miller, Jeffrey S. Something Completely Different: British Television and American Culture : 1960-1980, Volume 2. Michigan State University, 1997.
