= Xtro =

1983 film directed by Harry Bromley Davenport

- Theatrical release poster
- Directed by: Harry Bromley Davenport
- Screenplay by: Harry Bromley Davenport; Michel Parry; Iain Cassie; Robert Smith
- Produced by: Mark Forstater
- Starring: Philip Sayer; Bernice Stegers; Maryam d'Abo; Simon Nash
- Cinematography: John Metcalfe
- Edited by: Nicolas Gaster
- Music by: Harry Bromley Davenport
- Production companies: Ashley Productions Ltd. Amalgamated Film Enterprises Ltd.
- Distributed by: New Line Cinema Corporation (United States)
- Release date: March 1983 (United Kingdom)
- Running time: 87 minutes
- Country: United Kingdom
- Language: English
- Budget: $60,000
- Box office: $1 million

Xtro is a 1983 British science fiction horror film written and directed by Harry Bromley Davenport. The film stars Bernice Stegers, Philip Sayer, Simon Nash, and Maryam d'Abo. The film focuses on a man who was abducted by aliens and returns back to his wife and son three years later.

The film received largely negative reviews from critics, while the special effects were praised.

== Plot ==
As Sam Phillips and his son Tony are playing outside their farm, Sam is suddenly abducted by a bright light. Three years later, the light returns and plants a seed in a forest. A half-human, half-alien creature develops from the seed, and is hit by a car; the couple in the car are soon killed. The creature then goes to a nearby cottage, where it assaults and impregnates a young woman before dissolving. Upon waking, her abdomen expands aggressively until she dies giving birth to a fully grown Sam. Sam washes himself, steals the driver's clothes and leaves in the car.

Sam seeks out Tony, who lives in an apartment building in London with his mother Rachel, her new American boyfriend Joe Daniels, and French au pair Analise Mercier. Tony has recurring nightmares where he wakes up soaked in another person's blood. Sam picks Tony up from school and is found by Rachel. Despite Joe's consternation Sam goes to live with the family, claiming that he cannot remember anything. After Tony sees Sam eating the eggs of his pet snake, Sam comforts him and drinks his blood. Tony soon discovers he has paranormal powers, which he uses to send a human-sized toy soldier to slaughter a neighbour who killed his snake and to bring a toy clown to life.

Sam and Rachel visit the farm where they used to live, leaving Tony in Analise's care. During a game of hide-and-seek with Tony, Analise is knocked out by the clown and used as a womb for the alien eggs. Tony sends a toy tank to attack her boyfriend Michael, who is killed by a panther as he tries to flee. Meanwhile, as Sam and Rachel make love at the farm, his skin starts to bleed and decompose. Joe takes Tony to the farm, where Sam takes his son up a hill towards the alien light. Sam, now taking the form of an alien, uses his scream to kill Joe. Sam and Tony enter the light and return to the alien world, leaving Rachel behind.

Rachel, now pregnant with Sam's second, alien child, goes home and finds the eggs have hatched into multiple clones of Tony. The clones then come to her and rub her pregnant belly, as Rachel smiles.

=== Director's cut ending ===
In an alternate ending, Rachel arrives home and finds an overturned refrigerator full of eggs. As she picks up one, Rachel is killed by a newborn creature.

== Cast ==
- Philip Sayer as Sam Phillips
- Bernice Stegers as Rachel Phillips
- Danny Brainin as Joe Daniels
- Maryam d'Abo as Analise Mercier
- Simon Nash as Tony Phillips
- Peter Mandell as Clown
- David Cardy as Michael
- Anna Wing as Mrs. Goodman
- Robert Fyfe as Doctor
- Katherine Best as Jane
- Robert Pereno as Ben
- Sean Crawford as Commando
- Tim Dry as Monster
- Susie Silvey as Woman In Cottage
- Arthur Whybrow as Mr. Knight

== Production ==
Producer Mark Forstater got involved in Xtro when the director Harry Bromley Davenport came to him with a script he'd written with Michel Parry. The two had previously met during a screening of Davenport’s directorial debut Whispers of Fear, which impressed Forstater. The film was financed by Ashley Productions Ltd., a subsidiary of a British investment group based in Manchester.

Forstater brought in two other writers, Robert Smith and Iain Cassie, stating that "The plot was kept intact, but the new writers went off into weird and wonderful tangents."

The film had a six-week shooting schedule. Christopher Hobbs, a sketch artist, helped sort out the visual concepts for the production, which originally involved a faceless rubber suit for a creature. This was changed to man on his hands and knees. A mime was hired to perform the strange scuttle of the walk.

== Release ==
Alan Jones wrote in a July issue of Cinefantastique that Xtro was initially set to be released by New Line later in 1982. In December 1982, an article in Fangoria scheduled the film for release in February 1983. Xtro was released in March 1983 in the United Kingdom.

When released on home video in 1983, the film was subject to a prosecution case in relation to British obscenity laws. Unlike many other "video nasties", as they were then called, Xtro had actually been passed uncut by the BBFC with an 18 certificate for theatrical release (with both the original and an alternate ending). The film even went on to reach 33rd place in the Gallup British video chart for 1983.

== Home media ==
Xtro was released on DVD three times in the US by Image Entertainment. The first DVD was released in 2005 as a double feature with sequel Xtro II: The Second Encounter. The second was released in 2006 as a standalone release. The third, released in 2007, was a triple feature alongside Xtro II and Skeeter. In the UK, the Xtro trilogy was released in box-set, remastered anamorphic widescreen with 5.1 for Xtro II and an interview with director Harry Bromley Davenport covering the production of all three films. It has been released on blu-ray format in the UK in October 2018 by Second Sight, with several featurettes and two alternate endings and four cuts of the film.

== Critical reception ==
Among contemporary reviewers, Alan Jones wrote in Starburst that the film has "occasional flashes of tangential inspiration" but was "really nothing very xtro-ordinary", finding that scenes did not scare him "or even disgust [him] to any great extent" and that he would have liked more characterisation and that Bernice Stegers was "horribly miscast". Jones went on to state that the special effects were "minor miracles of ingenuity" for their low budget and he at least admired director Metcalfe for "trying so earnestly to resuscitate low budget exploitation sf/horror films in this country."

Jo Imeson of the Monthly Film Bulletin described the film as a "sub s-f rip-off" and that it was "entirely lacking in the energy or resonances of It's Alive! horror-within-the-family genre." The review also noted "flat acting" stating that Bernice Stegers was "weighed down by a depressingly one-dimensional role". The review did note that "one or two effects are quite memorable — the cocoon in the bathroom, the revolting birth of a full-sized man". "Lor." of Variety found the film "too silly and underdeveloped in story values to expand beyond diehard fans" and that "Harry B Davenport builds little suspense and no thrills in a film devoid of stuntwork or action scenes. It's just another "check out that makeup" exercise, consisting of brief scenes and poor continuity" and that "acting is flat, with Stegers [...] inexpressive and unattractively styled."

Roger Ebert panned the film, awarding it 1 of 4 stars, calling the film "ugly" and "despairing" and further commenting, "Most exploitation movies are bad, but not necessarily painful to watch. They may be incompetent, they may be predictable, they may be badly acted or awkwardly directed, but at some level the filmmakers are enjoying themselves and at least trying to entertain an audience. Xtro is an exception, a completely depressing, nihilistic film, an exercise in sadness ... It's movies like this that give movies a bad name". Stephen Hunter writing for The Baltimore Sun called the film "the slimiest, wormiest, most nauseating film to come oozing into Baltimore in some time" that was "almost wholly incomprehensible". Hunter went on to state that "what is most depressing about Xtro is that its performances are first-rate, especially Stegers' as the distraught Mum" and that the cinematography by John Metcalfe "displays a good deal of technical finesse, particularly the long, apartment sequence".

Colin Greenland reviewed Xtro for Imagine magazine, and stated that "Xtro is quite unpretentious. It doesn't claim to be anything but a vehicle for Tony Harris' special effects, which are as virulent and glutinous as they come."

Among retrospective reviews, TV Guide awarded the film 0 of 4 stars, calling the film, "A vile exercise in grotesque special effects" and "an excuse to parade all manner of perversities across the screen", further stating that, "Not only is this disgusting, it lacks anything that remotely resembles suspense". AllMovie called the movie "pure trash" that was "made to capitalize on public interest in E.T. the Extra-Terrestrial" and "basically presents the gory, sexy exploitation-movie take on that film's 'alien visits Earth' premise."

On the review aggregator website Rotten Tomatoes, 44% of 9 critics' reviews are positive, with an average rating of 4.7/10.

== Sequels ==
Director Harry Bromley Davenport made two sequels to the film, Xtro II: The Second Encounter and Xtro 3: Watch the Skies. Neither of the sequels had anything to do with the first film. In March 2011, Davenport confirmed that Xtro 4 - The Big One is in the works.
