= Frozen Kiss =

- Directed by: Harry Bromley Davenport
- Written by: Rachel Calendar
- Produced by: Mike Snyder
- Starring: Cameron Goodman; Jamie Martz; Mimi Rogers; David Starzyk; Chris Meyer
- Cinematography: David Scott Ikegami
- Music by: Mark Hart
- Production company: Dorian. Inc.
- Distributed by: Universal Studios
- Release date: 2009
- Running time: 83 minutes
- Country: United States
- Language: English

Frozen Kiss is a 2009 American drama film, supposedly based on a true story. It stars Cameron Goodman and Mimi Rogers.

== Plot ==
The young couple consisting of Ryan and Shelley get stuck in a snow storm on their way home from a party. As they begin to walk, someone, or something, is coming after them.

== Cast ==
- Leslie Anne-huff
- Tochukwu Onyenze
