= Harry Bromley Davenport =

English film director and producer

- Born: 15 March 1950 (age 76); London, England
- Occupations: Film director; film producer; screenwriter; composer
- Years active: 1969–present
- Website: filmharry.com

Harry Bromley Davenport (born 15 March 1950 in London, England) is an English film director and producer as well as at the beginning of his career a screenwriter. He is most popular for the famous horror science-fiction video nasty Xtro (1983). He left the UK in 1990 and currently resides in Los Angeles. He became an American citizen in 1997.

== Film career ==
Bromley Davenport entered the film business in 1967 as an assistant to Nicholas Ray.

Following his apprenticeship, Bromley Davenport made his directorial debut with the little-seen Whispers of Fear (1976) and co-wrote the screenplay for Full Circle (1977), which was adapted from the Peter Straub novel Julia (1975) and starred Mia Farrow in the title role.

His biggest commercial success came in the form of Xtro (1983) which spawned two sequels related in title only. He made the second installment Xtro II: The Second Encounter (1991) in the US, and has worked exclusively there ever since.

Bromley Davenport remained within his own low-budget franchise for one more film, and hired Daryl Haney to write the screenplay for Xtro 3: Watch the Skies (1995). This began an ongoing professional relationship between himself and Haney that ultimately changed the direction of Bromley Davenport's career, culminating in a trio of films that are arguably his finest works: Life Among the Cannibals (1996), Erasable You (1998) and the true story Mockingbird Don't Sing (2001), starring Sean Young.

Three further feature films followed - all of which display his attraction to dark subject matter. His film Smile Pretty (2006) follows the true story of a Romanian child, played by teenage actress Scout Taylor-Compton, who was adopted by an American man with the intention of using her in child pornography in the USA. Haunted Echoes, a ghost story filmed in 2008, reunited him with Sean Young. Frozen Kiss (2010) starred Mimi Rogers and was based on the tragic true story of two young people who, after a night of partying and methamphetamine, became disorientated during their drive home in a blizzard and froze to death.

The year 2013 marked Bromley Davenport's first documentary in over 25 years. American Grand captures the work of a team of piano restoration experts as they spend nine months transforming a decaying 1913 Steinway into a revitalized shining beauty. The film was shown on PBS; it was reviewed by Mario Igrec, author of the definitive book on piano rebuilding Pianos Inside Out, as "a brand new piano documentary classic". Christopher O'Riley, host of the National Public Radio program From The Top, wrote that the film displays: "... an unsurpassed confluence of passion and precision in the work of the team in American Grand".

From 2016 until its release in 2020, he was occupied with Mike Garson and his 88 Friends, a documentary detailing the life and work of pianist, composer and raconteur Mike Garson, perhaps best known for his 20-year collaboration with David Bowie.

This film led to further work in the field of classical and jazz films, videos and promotional pieces. Bromley Davenport has made classical music videos with multiple concert pianists, always displaying a taste for the unusual or outrageous. His 2015 video Yana Reznik plays Rachmaninoff is a costume fantasy set during the First World War.

Even though he has made many deviations from the exploitation field since Xtro, the stigma is still attached, as Bromley Davenport himself admits that: "Getting a start in exploitation films, as I did, suddenly became unfashionable about 20 years ago, and such movies are now regarded as smut, despite the fact that they gave Martin Scorsese, Francis Ford Coppola, Jim Cameron, Joe Dante, Jonathan Demme and countless others their first opportunities to direct a professional movie."

In early 2015, Bromley Davenport announced that Xtro 4 is on the way. A flashback of his Xtro franchise and an Interview was part of the book Adventures In VHS by author Noel Mellor.

== Filmography ==
Year	Title	Note(s)
1976	Whispers of Fear	Director
1977	Full Circle	Co-screenwriter
1983	Xtro	Director, writer
1991	Xtro II: The Second Encounter	Director
1995	Xtro 3: Watch the Skies	Director, producer
1996	Life Among the Cannibals	Director, producer
1998	Erasable You	Director, producer
2001	Mockingbird Don't Sing	Director, producer
2006	Smile Pretty	Director
2008	Haunted Echoes	Director, executive producer
2010	Frozen Kiss	Director, executive producer
2013	American Grand	Director, producer
2016	Yana Reznik plays Rachmaninoff	Director, producer
2018	Mike Garson Steinway series concert at Palomar College, CA.	Director, producer
2020	Mike Garson and his 88 Friends	Director, producer
TBA	Xtro - The Big One	Director, producer
