= The Rapture (1991 film) =

1991 film by Michael Tolkin

- Theatrical release poster
- Directed by: Michael Tolkin
- Written by: Michael Tolkin
- Produced by: Karen Koch; Nancy Tenenbaum; Nick Wechsler
- Starring: Mimi Rogers; David Duchovny; Patrick Bauchau; Will Patton
- Cinematography: Bojan Bazelli
- Edited by: Suzanne Fenn
- Music by: Thomas Newman
- Production companies: New Line Cinema; Electric Pictures
- Distributed by: Fine Line Features
- Release dates: September 6, 1991 (TIFF); September 30, 1991 (NYFF); October 4, 1991 (United States)
- Running time: 100 minutes
- Country: United States
- Language: English
- Budget: $3 million
- Box office: $1.3 million

The Rapture is a 1991 drama film written and directed by Michael Tolkin. It stars Mimi Rogers as a woman who converts from a swinger to a born-again Christian after learning that a true Rapture is upon the world.

The low-budget film was a box office disappointment while critical reception was generally positive, with Rogers' performance praised as perhaps the best of her career.

== Plot ==
Sharon, a young Los Angeles woman, engages in a swinging, libidinous lifestyle. She comes into contact with an unnamed Christian sect that advises her that the Rapture is imminent based on their interpretations of strange dreams experienced by congregants.

In time, Sharon accepts this belief and becomes a born-again Christian. She then starts living a pious life, eventually marrying and having a daughter, Mary. When her husband Randy is killed in a senseless murder, however, she begins to question the benevolence of God. She believes God has called her to go to the desert to wait for the Rapture, and instead of leaving her daughter safely with friends, she decides Mary must come with her. Foster, a police officer, is concerned for their well-being after they are reduced to stealing food while they wait, but Sharon is insistent that the end is near.

Sharon begins to despair after a while, and at her daughter's urging, decides to hasten their ascendance to Heaven. She kills Mary with a gunshot but is unable to take her own life afterwards, afraid she will be condemned as having killed herself. She confesses to Foster what she had done and is jailed.

The Rapture occurs after an apparition of Mary (accompanied by two angels) appears at night. While Sharon sits in her cell the following day, a loud trumpet blast is heard worldwide, signaling the start of the Rapture. Later on, Sharon and Foster, after driving out into the desert, are both raptured to a Purgatory-like landscape. Foster, who had been an atheist his whole life, accepts God and is allowed entrance to Heaven, but Sharon blames God for Mary's death, and she cannot renounce her anger at God's perceived cruelty. Mary pleads with her to accept God back into her heart so she can join her and Randy in Heaven, but Sharon refuses, choosing to remain alone in the purgatory-like landscape for eternity.

== Cast ==
- Mimi Rogers as Sharon
- David Duchovny as Randy
- Kimberly Cullum as Mary
- Darwyn Carson as Maggie
- Patrick Bauchau as Vic
- James LeGros as Tommy
- Will Patton as Deputy Foster
- Carole Davis as Angie
- Sam Vlahos as Wayne
- Stéphanie Menuez as Diana
- Marvin Elkins as bartender

== Production ==
The film was shot in Los Angeles over six weeks.

=== Casting ===
Prior to Rogers's involvement, Sissy Spacek, Meg Ryan, and Rachel Ward passed on taking the role of Sharon. Tolkin noted that Rogers's Scientology beliefs played no bearing on her casting: "Mimi's background in Scientology played no role in my casting her, nor did I see it as a problem—we never even discussed it." Rogers added that "my own religious views didn't affect my approach to the picture at all." In another interview, though, she noted that the role was easier thanks to her view of Jesus:

I don't, for example, have a Jesus Christ definition of God... and I have no views on heaven or hell. To me they're alien concepts. If I were a practicing Christian or a Jew, with all the hang-ups of those religions, I don't think I could have done Sharon justice.

Rogers and Duchovny would later appear together in The X-Files.

== Release ==
The Rapture grossed $1.3 million at the North American box office against a production budget of $3 million.

== Reception ==
On review aggregator website Rotten Tomatoes, the film has an approval rating of 66% based on 32 reviews, with an average rating of 6.4/10.

Rogers especially won praise for her performance, with the Los Angeles Times calling it an "astonishingly stunning performance." Entertainment Weekly noted that Rogers "delivers a subtle and complex performance." Critic Robin Wood declared Rogers "gave one of the greatest performances in the history of the Hollywood cinema."

Roger Ebert gave The Rapture 4/4 stars and praised Tolkin for avoiding the "pious banalities" of most religious movies, instead "examining the logic of the final judgment as radically and uncompromisingly as he can."

A mixed review came from Peter Travers of Rolling Stone, who said Tolkin "earns points simply for trying" to make a serious religious film in the 1990s Hollywood film industry, yet by the final scenes The Rapture drifts into "loopy melodrama and blunts what had been the keen edge of Rogers's performance." John Simon of the National Review described The Rapture as "a piece of apocalyptic trash megalomaniacal to the point of imbecility".
