= Perfect Citizen =

Perfect Citizen is a program designed in 2010 to perform vulnerability assessment by the United States National Security Agency on U.S. critical infrastructure. It was originally reported to be a program to develop a system of sensors to detect cyber attacks on critical infrastructure computer networks in both the private and public sector through a network monitoring system named Einstein. It is funded by the Comprehensive National Cybersecurity Initiative and thus far Raytheon has received a contract for up to $100 million for the initial stage.

The program was originally reported to be designed to monitor for, as well as neutralize and counter, cyberattacks against government agencies and private companies in critical parts of the U.S. private sector including defense, power plants, transportation, and major internet firms. The program is the successor to a previous surveillance project called "April Strawberry".

The project is still in an early stage, "but NSA officials have reportedly met with utility executives and politely asked them to cooperate with the surveillance." Although participation is still voluntary, the government has offered incentives such as additional contracts to those who comply.

== Controversy ==
The program, which is described by critics as "Big Brother", has raised privacy concerns as well as concerns over government intervention in the private sector.

== See also ==
- Echelon (signals intelligence)
