= Mimi Rogers =

American actress (born 1956)

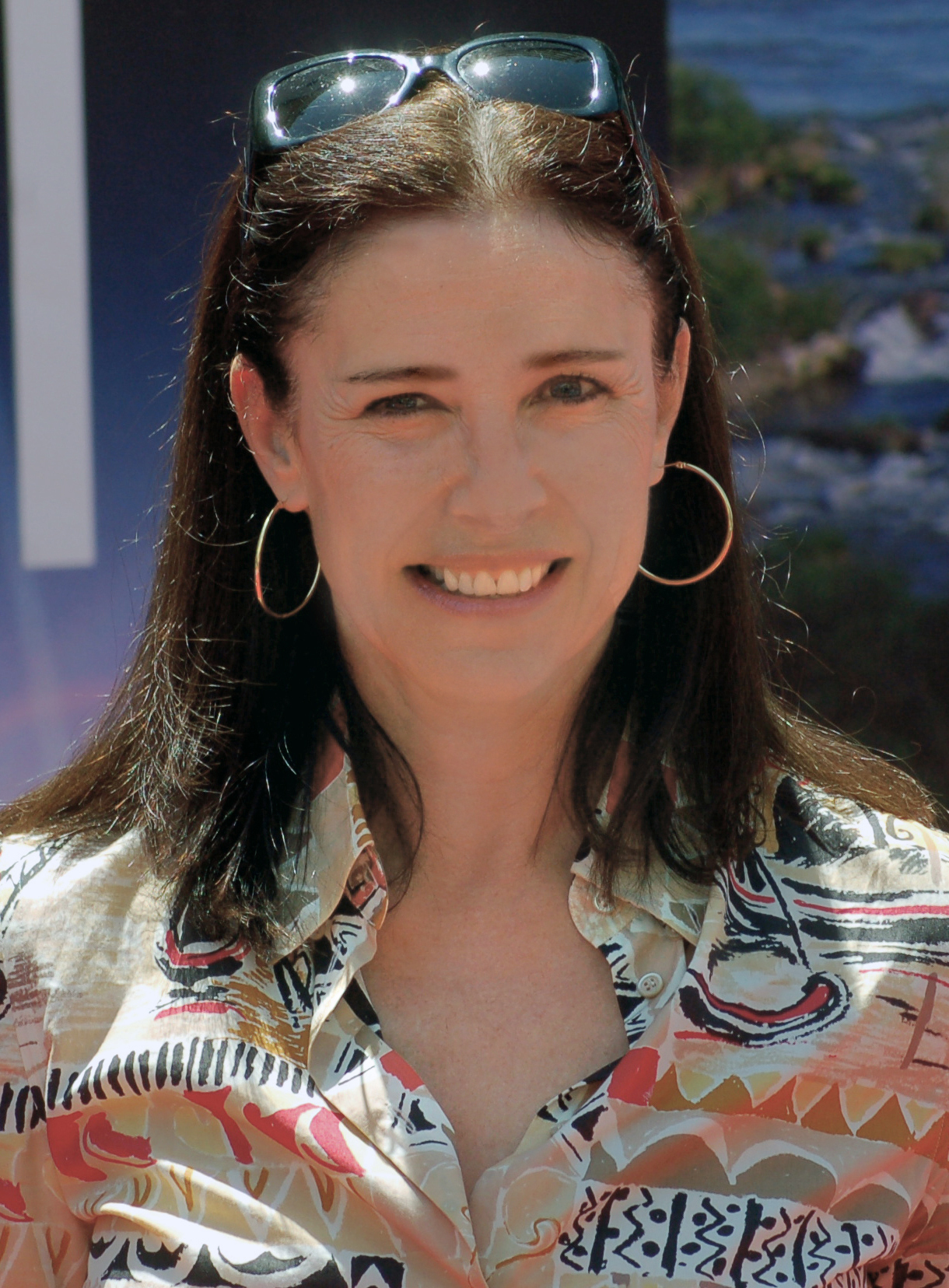
- Rogers at the premiere for Earth in April 2009
- Born: Miriam Ann Spickler; January 27, 1956 (age 70); Coral Gables, Florida, US
- Occupation: Actress
- Years active: 1981–present
- Board member of: World Poker Tour
- Spouses: Jim Rogers (m. 1976; div. 1980); Tom Cruise (m. 1987; div. 1990); Chris Ciaffa (m. 2003)
- Children: 2

Miriam Ann Rogers (née Spickler; born January 27, 1956) is an American actress.

Her notable film roles are Gung Ho (1986), Someone to Watch Over Me (1987), Desperate Hours (1990), and Full Body Massage (1995). She garnered the greatest acclaim of her career for her role in the religious drama The Rapture (1991), with critic Robin Wood declaring that she "gave one of the greatest performances in the history of the Hollywood cinema." Rogers has since appeared in Reflections on a Crime (1994), The Mirror Has Two Faces (1996), Austin Powers: International Man of Mystery (1997), Lost in Space (1998), Ginger Snaps (2000), The Door in the Floor (2004), and For a Good Time, Call... (2012).

Her work in television includes Paper Dolls (1984), Weapons of Mass Distraction (1997), The Loop (2006–2007), and recurring roles on The X-Files (1998–1999), Two and a Half Men (2011–2015), Wilfred (2014), Mad Men (2015), Bosch (2014–2021), and Bosch: Legacy (2022).

== Early life ==
Rogers was born Miriam Ann Spickler at Coral Gables Hospital in Coral Gables, Florida. She is the daughter of Philip C. Spickler, a civil engineer, and Kathy Talent, a former dance and drama major. Rogers's father was Jewish and her mother Episcopalian. Her father became involved with Scientology before she was born, and the organization was part of her upbringing.

The family lived in Virginia, Arizona, Michigan, and England before settling in Los Angeles. At the age of fourteen, Rogers finished her formal education and graduated from high school. She later worked in a hospital for incapacitated patients outside Palo Alto, California, and for six years she worked part-time as a social worker involved in substance-abuse counseling.

At the beginning of their acting careers, Rogers and Kirstie Alley lived together.

== Career ==
After her first marriage ended, Rogers moved to Los Angeles to embark on an acting career. She studied acting with Milton Katselas for nine months and then sought an agent. She screen tested for the lead role in Body Heat which eventually went to Kathleen Turner. Her early television roles included guest spots on Hill Street Blues (1981) as a love interest for officer Andy Renko (Charles Haid), as well as Magnum, P.I. (1982), and Hart to Hart (1983). In 1982, Rogers starred in the made-for-TV-movie Hear No Evil as Meg. She made her feature film debut in the sports comedy Blue Skies Again (1983). Between 1983 and 1984, she worked extensively in television as a series regular on The Rousters and as supermodel Blair Harper-Fenton in Paper Dolls. In 1986, she starred alongside Michael Keaton in Gung Ho.

In 1986, Rogers auditioned for the female lead in Fatal Attraction which went to Glenn Close. However, Rogers got her breakthrough role when she was cast opposite Tom Berenger in Someone to Watch Over Me (1987). Rogers played Claire Gregory, a socialite who is protected after she witnesses a murder. In 1989, she was in The Mighty Quinn starring Denzel Washington. In 1990, she appeared in Desperate Hours.

In 1991, Rogers starred as the protagonist in The Rapture about a woman who converts from a swinger to a born-again Christian after learning that a true Rapture is upon the world. She received an Independent Spirit Award for Best Female Lead nomination for her role in the film. Slant Magazine praised her "spectacular performance, which seems in part inspired by the physical splendors and feral glances of Bette Davis or Barbara Stanwyck."

Rogers posed nude for the March 1993 edition of Playboy magazine, and also appeared on that issue's cover. She later explained "Playboy had been after me for years, and finally I agreed to pose when they gave me complete approval over the shoot. It was done in a tasteful way, and since I knew that I wanted to have children soon, I thought it might be nice to have a permanent record of my body in its prime."

In 1994, Rogers starred as a woman on death row in the prison thriller Reflections on a Crime and received the Best Actress prize for the film at the Seattle International Film Festival. New York Magazine praised Rogers's "typically terrific performance" in the film.

Rogers later joined an ensemble cast in the critically acclaimed comedy-drama Trees Lounge (1996). She also had a supporting role alongside Barbra Streisand and Lauren Bacall in The Mirror Has Two Faces (1996). Her next film was the beginning of what would become a major franchise, when she appeared as Mrs. Kensington in Austin Powers: International Man of Mystery (1997).

In 1998, she co-starred in Lost in Space. A year later, she co-produced and co-starred in the Holocaust drama The Devil's Arithmetic. Together with her fellow producers, Rogers received a Daytime Emmy Award nomination for Outstanding Children's Special for the film. Between 1998 and 1999, Rogers also had a recurring role on The X-Files playing Diana Fowley for seven episodes. In 2000, she starred in the critically acclaimed Canadian horror film Ginger Snaps. She was also a series regular on the short-lived ABC series The Geena Davis Show (2000–01).

Rogers later made television appearances on Dawson's Creek (2003) as the mother of Jen Lindley (Michelle Williams) and in Las Vegas (2003). She also appears in the comedy prequel Dumb and Dumberer: When Harry Met Lloyd (2003). In 2004, she starred alongside Jeff Bridges and Kim Basinger in the drama The Door in the Floor. Between 2006 and 2007, Rogers was a series regular on the Fox comedy The Loop playing Meryl. In 2010, Rogers had a guest voice role on King of the Hill and served as a producer on Unstoppable.

In 2010, she performed at the Geffen Playhouse in Love, Loss, and What I Wore. In 2011, she was cast in the recurring role of Robin Schmidt, a primatologist and Ashton Kutcher's mother on Two and a Half Men. Rogers resumed the role in the season 10 premiere episode. In 2012, she made a guest appearance on The Client List, and appeared in the films For a Good Time, Call... and, alongside Meryl Streep, in Hope Springs.

In 2012, she was cast alongside Chad Michael Murray in the ABC pilot Scruples, as Harriet, a "powerful and vindictive magazine editor". In 2015, she appeared on AMC's Mad Men playing a bisexual photographer.

From 2014 to 2021, she had a recurring role in Bosch. Rogers appears as Honey Chandler, an attorney at odds with the titular character portrayed by Titus Welliver. She has since reprised the role as Honey Chandler in the Amazon Freevee (recently rebranded from IMDb TV) spin-off Bosch: Legacy, which premiered in 2022.

== Other ventures ==
Having played poker as a teenager, Rogers took up competitive poker in 2003 and finished in the money in her first major tournament at the World Poker Tour's 240 player Shooting Stars' main event No-Limit Texas hold 'em tournament in San Jose, California, on March 4, 2004. She is on the board of directors of the World Poker Tour. In July 2006, she finished in the money (33rd place) at the $1000 Ladies' No-Limit Hold 'em World Series of Poker event.

== Personal life ==
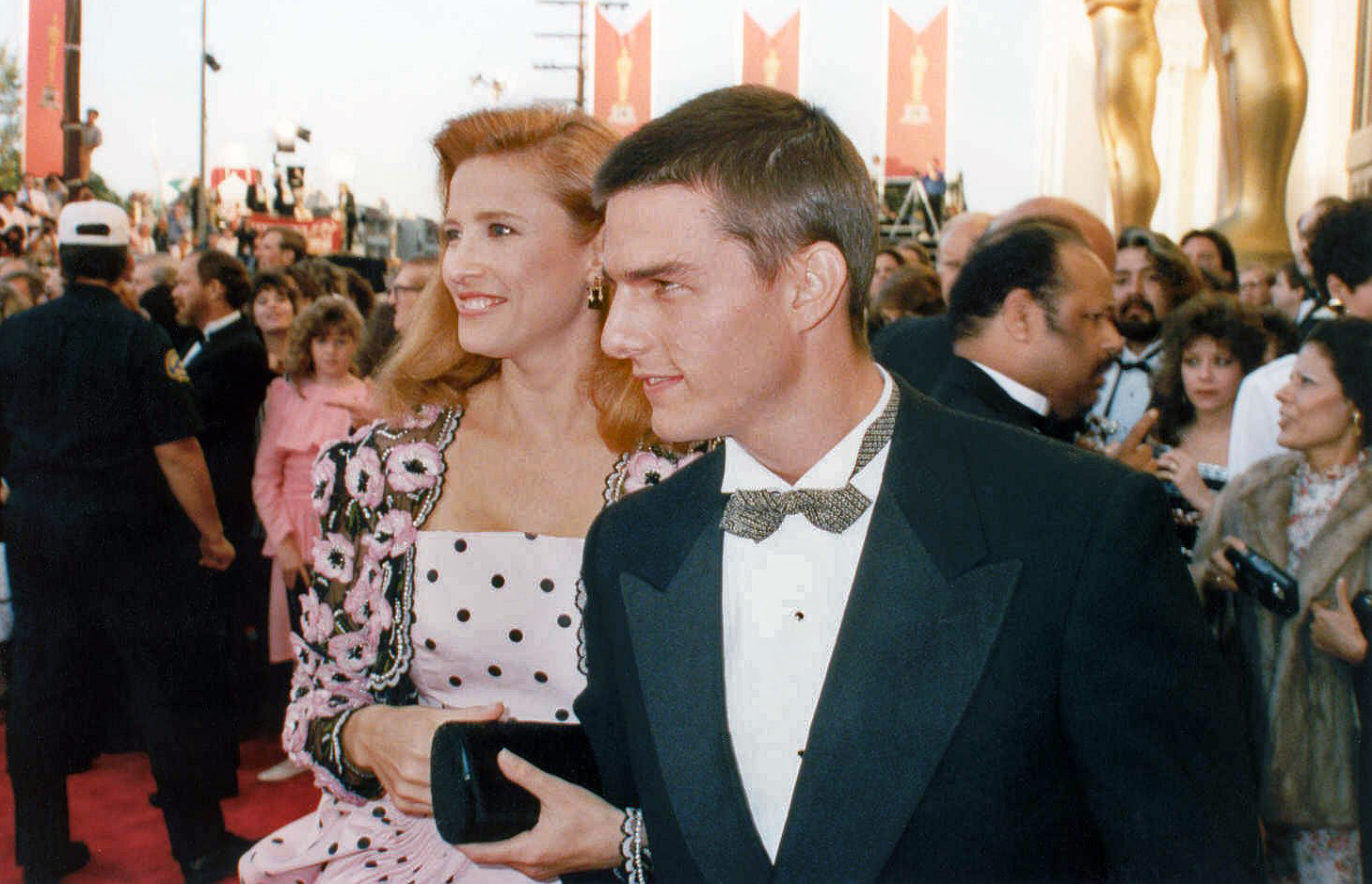
Rogers with Tom Cruise at the 1989 Academy Awards

Rogers has been married three times. She married Jim Rogers on August 21, 1976, and assumed his surname; they divorced in September 1980. She then had a relationship with Emilio Estevez. On May 9, 1987, she married actor Tom Cruise in Bedford, New York; the marriage broke down at the end of 1989, and a divorce was finalized in February 1990. Rogers received a settlement of $4 million, and is believed to have introduced Cruise to Scientology.

In a 1993 Playboy interview, Rogers discussed her split from Cruise and said that he had been considering becoming a monk, which affected their intimacy. Rogers later retracted the comments and said she had been misinterpreted.

In April 1990, Rogers met her present husband, producer Chris Ciaffa, on the set of Ivan Passer's made-for-cable film Fourth Story. They married on March 20, 2003, at the Beverly Hills courthouse. The couple has a daughter, Armory Films creative executive Lucy Ciaffa (born November 20, 1994) and a son, Arizona State University alumnus Charlie Ciaffa (born July 30, 2001). During an interview on The Late Late Show with Craig Kilborn, Rogers joked that the marriage—after 13 years living together and two children—was just so they would be eligible for a country club membership.

Rogers has made campaign contributions to the Democratic Party.

=== Scientology ===
Rogers's father became interested in Dianetics in 1952 and later became a prominent Mission Holder with the Church of Scientology and friend of its founder, L. Ron Hubbard. Rogers also reportedly became a highly trained "auditor" with the church. Prior to her acting career, she opened a "field auditing" practice, the Enhancement Center, with her first husband, Jim Rogers. According to Sonny Bono, Rogers was his "auditor" for dianetics. Tom Cruise was also a client before being directed towards a Celebrity Centre.

In an interview given to the Los Angeles Times in 1991, Rogers said about Scientology: "that philosophy was simply part of my upbringing and I liked it. And, I think it was an excellent system of belief to grow up with because Scientology offers an extremely pragmatic method for taking spiritual concerns and breaking them down into everyday applications."

Rogers has left the Church of Scientology and has been described in media reports as a former member of the church.

Cruise biographer Andrew Morton wrote that Rogers's father had been declared a suppressive person after leaving the church in the early 1980s, during a cull of Mission Holders.

According to 2012 article in Vanity Fair, Rogers held an unfavorable view of the church's controversial leader, David Miscavige. In Going Clear: Scientology, Hollywood, and the Prison of Belief, published in 2013, author Lawrence Wright wrote that Miscavige had pushed Rogers out of her marriage with Cruise so the latter could pursue Nicole Kidman.

== Filmography ==
=== Film ===
Year	Film	Role	Notes
1983	Blue Skies Again	Liz	
1986	Gung Ho	Audrey	
1987	Street Smart	Alison Parker	
1987	Someone to Watch Over Me	Claire Gregory	
1989	The Mighty Quinn	Hadley Elgin	
1989	Hider in the House	Julie Dreyer	
1990	The Palermo Connection	Carrie	
1990	Desperate Hours	Nora Cornell	
1991	The Doors	Magazine Photographer	
1991	The Rapture	Sharon	Nominated—Independent Spirit Award for Best Female Lead
1991	Wedlock	Tracy Riggs	
1992	White Sands	Molly Dolezal	uncredited
1992	Dark Horse	Dr. Susan Hadley	
1992	Shooting Elizabeth	Elizabeth Pigeon	
1994	Monkey Trouble	Amy Gregory	
1994	Bulletproof Heart	Fiona	
1994	Reflections on a Crime	Regina	Seattle International Film Festival Award for Best Actress
1995	The Beast	Martha	Short film
1995	Far from Home: The Adventures of Yellow Dog	Katherine McCormick	
1996	Trees Lounge	Patty	
1996	The Mirror Has Two Faces	Claire	
1997	Austin Powers: International Man of Mystery	Mrs. Marie Kensington	
1998	Lost in Space	Dr. Maureen Robinson	
2000	Ginger Snaps	Pamela Fitzgerald	
2000	The Upgrade	The Yuppie	Short
2000	Cruel Intentions 2	Tiffany Merteuil	
2003	Dumb and Dumberer: When Harry Met Lloyd	Mrs. Dunne	
2004	The Gunman	Eve Richards	
2004	Seeing Other People	Elise	
2004	The Door in the Floor	Evelyn Vaughn	
2005	Dancing in Twilight	April	
2006	Penny Dreadful	Orianna Volkes	
2006	Big Nothing	Mrs. Smalls	
2009	Frozen Kiss	Gayle	
2010	Abandoned	Victoria Markham	
2010	Unstoppable	—N/a	Producer
2011	Lucky	Ms. Brand	
2011	Balls to the Wall	Mrs. Matthews	
2012	For a Good Time, Call...	Adele	
2012	Hope Springs	Carol	
2014	Mall		
2014	The Surface	Kim	
2015	Weepah Way for Now	Lynn	
2015	The Wedding Ringer	Lois Palmer	
2015	Captive	Kim Rogers	
2015	This Isn't Funny	Elaine Anderson	
2018	Affairs of State	Judith Baines	
2018	What Still Remains	Judith	
2022	Four Ladies Dancing	Mimi	
2025	Adult Children	Mimi	
2026	Night Nurse	Doctor Mann	
2026	What Happened to Doris		

=== Television films ===
Year	Film	Role	Notes
1982	Divorce Wars: A Love Story	Belinda Wittiker	
1982	Hear No Evil	Meg	
1985	Embassy	Nancy Russell	
1991	Fourth Story	Valerie McCoughlin	
1991	Wedlock	Tracy Rigg	
1992	Ladykiller	Michael Madison	
1993	Bloodlines: Murder in the Family	Melody Woodman	
1993	A Kiss to Die For	Ali Broussard	
1995	Full Body Massage	Nina	
1996	In the Blink of an Eye	Sonia Jacobs	
1997	Weapons of Mass Distraction	Ariel Powers	Nominated—Satellite Award for Best Actress – Miniseries or Television Film
1997	Tricks	Jackie	
1997	The Christmas List	Melody Parris	
1998	Virtual Obsession	Karen Messenger	
1999	The Devil's Arithmetic	Leonore Stern	Also producer Nominated—Daytime Emmy Award for Outstanding Children's Special
1999	Little White Lies	Ellie	
1999	Seven Girlfriends	Julian	
2000	Common Ground	McPherson	
2002	Charms for the Easy Life	Sophia	
2003	Cave In	Pat Bogen	
2005	Stone Cold	Rita Fiore	
2005	Selling Innocence	Abby Sampson	
2006	The Stranger Game	Joanna Otis	
2008	Storm Cell	April Saunders	
2009	Falling Up	Meredith	
2010	Order of Chaos	Mrs. Craig	
2010	Sins of the Mother	Lois	

=== Television series ===
Year	Film	Role	Notes
1981	Hill Street Blues	Sandra Pauley	2 episodes
1981	Quincy, M.E.	Corrina Girard	2 episodes
1982	Magnum, P.I.	Margo Perina	Episode: "Italian Ice"
1983	Hart to Hart	Robin Wall	Episode: "Hartstruck"
1983–1984	The Rousters	Ellen Slade	13 episodes
1984	Paper Dolls	Blair Fenton-Harper	13 episodes
1987	Disneyland	Charlotte	Episode: "You Ruined My Life"
1991–1992	Dream On	Julia Montana	3 episodes
1992	Tales from the Crypt	Helen	Episode: "Beauty Rest"
1992–1994	The Larry Sanders Show	Mimi Rogers	2 episodes
1996	Partners	Melissa	Episode: "Your Baby-sitter?"
1998–1999	The X-Files	Agent Diana Fowley	7 episodes
1999–2000	It's Like, You Know...	Deidre Swayze	2 episodes
2000–2001	The Geena Davis Show	Hillary	22 episodes
2002	What's New, Scooby-Doo?	Maura Ravenmane (voice)	Episode: "She Sees Sea Monsters by the Sea Shore"
2003	Dawson's Creek	Helen Lindley	Episode: "Goodbye, Yellow Brick Road"
2003	Las Vegas	Sandra Adlman	Episode: "Luck Be a Lady"
2004	Hope & Faith	Annie Hannigan	Episode: "Madam President"
2006–2007	The Loop	Meryl	17 episodes
2008	My Boys	Maggie	2 episodes
2010	King of the Hill	Kadee Calhoun (voice)	Episode: "Bill Gathers Moss"
2010	Neighbors from Hell	Lorelai Killbride	Episode: "Country Club Hell"
2011	CollegeHumor Originals	Bionic Woman	2 episodes
2011–2015	Two and a Half Men	Robin Schmidt	6 episodes
2012	The Client List	Valerie Dawson	Episode: "The Rub of Sugarland"
2012	Scruples	Harriet	Unsold TV pilot
2014	Wilfred	Catherine Newman	3 episodes
2014	Cleaners	Isabelle Walker	6 episodes
2015–2021	Bosch	Honey Chandler	34 episodes
2015	NCIS	Joanna Teague	3 episodes
2015	Mad Men	Pima	Episode: "New Business"
2015	Ash vs Evil Dead	Suzy Maxwell	Episode: "Bait"
2017	Blue Bloods	Trudy Slaughter	Episode: "Brushed Off"
2018	How to Get Away with Murder	Natalie Wright	Episode: "Your Funeral"
2019	NCIS: Los Angeles	Felice Waterson	Episode: "Smokescreen, Part 2"
2022–2025	Bosch: Legacy	Honey Chandler	Main role
2025	Ballard	Honey Chandler	Episode: "End of the Line"
